= List of American films of 1949 =

More than 356 American feature films were released in 1949.
All the King's Men won the Academy Award for Best Picture.

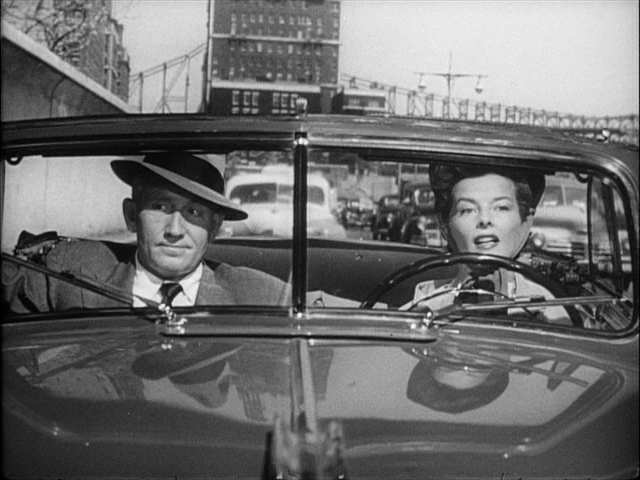
Adam's Rib

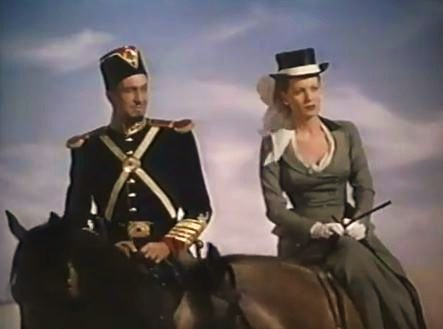
Bagdad

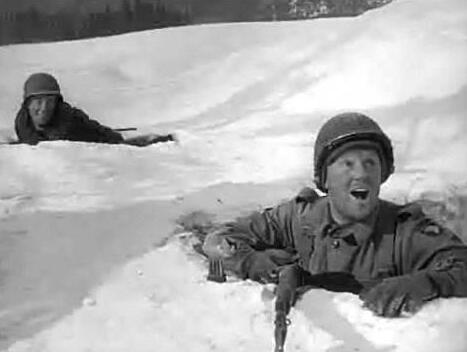
Battleground

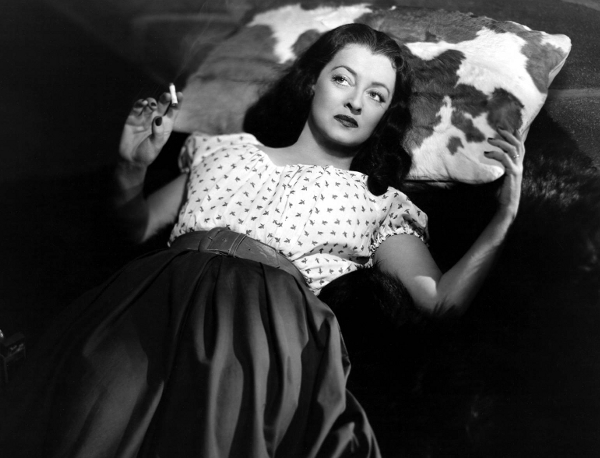
Beyond the Forest

== A-B ==
Title	Director	Cast	Genre	Notes
Abandoned	Joseph M. Newman	Dennis O'Keefe, Gale Storm, Jeff Chandler	Film noir	Universal
Abbott and Costello Meet the Killer, Boris Karloff	Charles Barton	Bud Abbott, Lou Costello, Boris Karloff	Comedy horror	Universal
The Accused	William Dieterle	Loretta Young, Robert Cummings, Wendell Corey	Film noir	Paramount
Across the Rio Grande	Oliver Drake	Jimmy Wakely, Reno Browne, Dub Taylor	Western	Monogram
Act of Violence	Fred Zinnemann	Van Heflin, Robert Ryan, Janet Leigh, Mary Astor	Drama	MGM
Adam's Rib	George Cukor	Spencer Tracy, Katharine Hepburn, Jean Hagen	Romantic comedy	MGM; script by Ruth Gordon, Garson Kanin
Adventure in Baltimore	Richard Wallace	Shirley Temple, Robert Young, John Agar	Drama	RKO
The Adventures of Ichabod and Mr. Toad	James Algar, Clyde Geronimi	Bing Crosby, Eric Blore, Basil Rathbone	Animation	Disney; Golden Globe for Cinematography, Color
Africa Screams	Charles Barton	Bud Abbott, Lou Costello, Clyde Beatty	Comedy	United Artists
Air Hostess	Lew Landers	Gloria Henry, Audrey Long, Marjorie Lord	Drama	Columbia
Alias the Champ	George Blair	Audrey Long, Gorgeous George, Robert Rockwell	Mystery	Republic
Alias Nick Beal	John Farrow	Ray Milland, Audrey Totter, Thomas Mitchell	Horror	Paramount
Alimony	Alfred Zeisler	Martha Vickers, John Beal, Hillary Brooke	Film noir	Eagle-Lion
All the King's Men	Robert Rossen	Broderick Crawford, Mercedes McCambridge, John Ireland	Drama	Columbia; Remade in 2006
Always Leave Them Laughing	Roy Del Ruth	Milton Berle, Virginia Mayo, Bert Lahr	Comedy	Warner Bros.
And Baby Makes Three	Henry Levin	Barbara Hale, Robert Young, Janis Carter	Comedy	Columbia
Angels in Disguise	Jean Yarbrough	Leo Gorcey, Huntz Hall, Gabriel Dell	Comedy	Monogram
Anna Lucasta	Irving Rapper	Paulette Goddard, William Bishop Broderick Crawford	Film noir	Columbia; Remade in 1958
Any Number Can Play	Mervyn LeRoy	Clark Gable, Alexis Smith, Wendell Corey, Mary Astor	Drama	MGM
Arctic Manhunt	Ewing Scott	Mikel Conrad, Carol Thurston, Wally Cassell	Adventure	Universal
Arson, Inc.	William Berke	Robert Lowery, Anne Gwynne, Edward Brophy	Drama	Lippert
Bad Boy	Kurt Neumann	Audie Murphy, Jane Wyatt, Lloyd Nolan	Drama	Allied Artists
Bad Men of Tombstone	Kurt Neumann	Broderick Crawford, Barry Sullivan, Marjorie Reynolds	Western	Allied Artists
Bagdad	Charles Lamont	Maureen O'Hara, Paul Christian, Vincent Price	Adventure	Universal
Bandit King of Texas	Fred C. Brannon	Allan Lane, Helene Stanley, Eddy Waller	Western	Republic
Bandits of El Dorado	Ray Nazarro	Charles Starrett, Clayton Moore, Smiley Burnette	Western	Columbia
Barbary Pirate	Lew Landers	Donald Woods, Trudy Marshall, Lenore Aubert	Adventure	Columbia
The Barkleys of Broadway	Charles Walters	Fred Astaire, Ginger Rogers, Billie Burke	Musical	MGM; Final Astaire-Rogers pairing
Battleground	William Wellman	Van Johnson, Ricardo Montalbán, George Murphy	War	MGM
The Beautiful Blonde from Bashful Bend	Preston Sturges	Betty Grable, Cesar Romero, Rudy Vallée	Western	20th Century Fox
Beyond the Forest	King Vidor	Bette Davis, Joseph Cotten, Ruth Roman	Drama	Warner Bros.
The Big Cat	Phil Karlson	Lon McCallister, Peggy Ann Garner, Preston Foster	Adventure	Eagle-Lion Films
Big Jack	Richard Thorpe	Wallace Beery, Richard Conte, Marjorie Main	Western	MGM; Beery's final film
The Big Sombrero	Frank McDonald	Gene Autry, Elena Verdugo, Stephen Dunne	Western	Columbia
The Big Steal	Don Siegel	Robert Mitchum, Jane Greer, William Bendix	Drama	RKO
The Big Wheel	Edward Ludwig	Mickey Rooney, Thomas Mitchell, Mary Hatcher	Drama	United Artists
Black Magic	Gregory Ratoff	Orson Welles, Nancy Guild, Akim Tamiroff	Adventure	United Artists
Black Midnight	Budd Boetticher	Roddy McDowall, Damian O'Flynn, Lyn Thomas	Western	Monogram. Boetticher's 1st western
The Blazing Trail	Ray Nazarro	Charles Starrett, Marjorie Stapp, Smiley Burnette	Western	Columbia
The Blonde Bandit	Harry Keller	Dorothy Patrick, Gerald Mohr, Robert Rockwell	Crime	Republic
Blondie's Big Deal	Edward Bernds	Penny Singleton, Arthur Lake, Larry Simms	Comedy	Columbia
Blondie Hits the Jackpot	Edward Bernds	Penny Singleton, Arthur Lake, Larry Simms	Comedy	Columbia
Bodyhold	Seymour Friedman	Willard Parker, Lola Albright, Hillary Brooke	Action	Columbia
Bomba, the Jungle Boy	Ford Beebe	Johnny Sheffield, Peggy Ann Garner, Onslow Stevens	Adventure	Monogram
Bomba on Panther Island	Ford Beebe	Johnny Sheffield, Allene Roberts, Lita Baron	Adventure	Monogram
Border Incident	Anthony Mann	Ricardo Montalbán, Howard Da Silva, George Murphy	Drama	MGM
Boston Blackie's Chinese Venture	Seymour Friedman	Chester Morris, Maylia Fong, Richard Lane	Mystery	Columbia
Brand of Fear	Oliver Drake	Jimmy Wakely, Gail Davis, Tom London	Western	Monogram
The Bribe	Robert Z. Leonard	Robert Taylor, Ava Gardner, Charles Laughton, Vincent Price	Film noir	MGM
Bride for Sale	William D. Russell	Claudette Colbert, Robert Young, George Brent	Comedy	RKO
Bride of Vengeance	Mitchell Leisen	Paulette Goddard, John Lund, Macdonald Carey	Historical	Paramount
Brimstone	Joseph Kane	Rod Cameron, Walter Brennan, Lorna Gray	Western	Republic
Brothers in the Saddle	Lesley Selander	Tim Holt, Richard Martin, Steve Brodie	Western	RKO

== C-D ==
Title	Director	Cast	Genre	Notes
Calamity Jane and Sam Bass	George Sherman	Yvonne De Carlo, Howard Duff, Dorothy Hart	Western	Universal
Canadian Pacific	Edwin L. Marin	Randolph Scott, Jane Wyatt, J. Carrol Naish	Western	20th Century Fox
Caught	Max Ophüls	James Mason, Barbara Bel Geddes, Robert Ryan	Film noir	MGM
Challenge of the Range	Ray Nazarro	Charles Starrett, Paula Raymond, Steve Darrell	Western	Columbia
Challenge to Lassie	Richard Thorpe	Donald Crisp, Edmund Gwenn, Geraldine Brooks	Drama	MGM
Champion	Mark Robson	Kirk Douglas, Arthur Kennedy, Marilyn Maxwell	Film noir	United Artists; 6 Oscar nominations
Chicago Deadline	Lewis Allen	Alan Ladd, Donna Reed, June Havoc	Film noir	Paramount
Chicken Every Sunday	George Seaton	Dan Dailey, Celeste Holm, Colleen Townsend	Comedy	20th Century Fox
Chinatown at Midnight	Seymour Friedman	Hurd Hatfield, Jean Willes, Tom Powers	Crime drama	Columbia
City Across the River	Maxwell Shane	Stephen McNally, Thelma Ritter, Sue England	Film noir	Universal; Curtis's first film
The Clay Pigeon	Richard Fleischer	Barbara Hale, Bill Williams, Richard Quine	Crime drama	RKO
C-Man	Joseph Lerner	Dean Jagger, John Carradine, Edith Atwater	Film noir	Film Classics
Colorado Territory	Raoul Walsh	Joel McCrea, Virginia Mayo, Dorothy Malone	Western	Warner Bros. Remake of High Sierra
Come to the Stable	Henry Koster	Loretta Young, Celeste Holm, Hugh Marlowe	Drama	20th Century Fox
A Connecticut Yankee in King Arthur's Court	Tay Garnett	Bing Crosby, Rhonda Fleming, Cedric Hardwicke	Musical comedy	Paramount; from a story by Mark Twain
Cover Up	Alfred E. Green	William Bendix, Dennis O'Keefe, Barbara Britton	Film noir	United Artists
The Cowboy and the Indians	John English	Gene Autry, Sheila Ryan, Frank Richards	Western	Columbia
The Crime Doctor's Diary	Seymour Friedman	Warner Baxter, Lois Maxwell, Stephen Dunne	Mystery	Columbia. Last of series
Criss Cross	Robert Siodmak	Burt Lancaster, Yvonne De Carlo, Dan Duryea	Film noir	Universal
The Crooked Way	Robert Florey	John Payne, Ellen Drew, Sonny Tufts	Film noir	United Artists
Dancing in the Dark	Irving Reis	William Powell, Betsy Drake, Adolphe Menjou	Musical comedy	20th Century Fox
A Dangerous Profession	Ted Tetzlaff	George Raft, Ella Raines, Pat O'Brien	Film noir	RKO
The Daring Caballero	Wallace Fox	Duncan Renaldo, Leo Carrillo, Charles Halton	Western	United Artists
Daughter of the Jungle	George Blair	Lois Hall, Sheldon Leonard, James Cardwell	Adventure	Republic
Daughter of the West	Harold Daniels	Martha Vickers, Phillip Reed, Donald Woods	Western	Film Classics
Dear Wife	Richard Haydn	William Holden, Joan Caulfield, Edward Arnold	Comedy	Paramount
Death Valley Gunfighter	R. G. Springsteen	Allan Lane, Gail Davis, Eddy Waller	Western	Republic
Desert Vigilante	Fred F. Sears	Charles Starrett, Peggy Stewart, Smiley Burnette	Western	Columbia
The Devil's Henchman	Seymour Friedman	Warner Baxter, Mary Beth Hughes, Regis Toomey	Crime	Columbia
The Doctor and the Girl	Curtis Bernhardt	Glenn Ford, Gloria DeHaven, Janet Leigh	Drama	MGM
The Doolins of Oklahoma	Gordon Douglas	Randolph Scott, George Macready, Louise Allbritton	Western	Columbia
Down Dakota Way	William Witney	Roy Rogers, Dale Evans, Elisabeth Risdon	Western	Republic
Down to the Sea in Ships	Henry Hathaway	Richard Widmark, Lionel Barrymore, Cecil Kellaway	Adventure	20th Century Fox; Remake of 1922 silent film
Duke of Chicago	George Blair	Audrey Long, Tom Brown, Grant Withers	Sports	Republic
Dynamite	William H. Pine	William Gargan, Richard Crane, Virginia Welles	Film noir	Paramount

== E-H ==
Title	Director	Cast	Genre	Notes
East Side, West Side	Mervyn LeRoy	Barbara Stanwyck, James Mason, Van Heflin, Ava Gardner	Crime drama	MGM
Easy Living	Jacques Tourneur	Victor Mature, Lucille Ball, Lizabeth Scott	Drama	RKO
Edward, My Son	George Cukor	Spencer Tracy, Deborah Kerr, Ian Hunter	Drama	MGM-British. Oscar nomination for Kerr
El Paso	Lewis R. Foster	John Payne, Gail Russell, Sterling Hayden	Western	Paramount
Everybody Does It	Edmund Goulding	Paul Douglas, Linda Darnell, Celeste Holm	Comedy	20th Century Fox. Remake of 1937 film
Family Honeymoon	Claude Binyon	Claudette Colbert, Fred MacMurray, Rita Johnson	Comedy	Universal
The Fan	Otto Preminger	Madeleine Carroll, Jeanne Crain, Richard Greene, George Sanders	Comedy	20th Century Fox. Based on Oscar Wilde story
Father Was a Fullback	John M. Stahl	Fred MacMurray, Maureen O'Hara, Rudy Vallée	Family	20th Century Fox
Feudin' Rhythm	Edward Bernds	Eddy Arnold, Gloria Henry, Kirby Grant	Western musical	Columbia
Fighting Fools	Reginald LeBorg	Leo Gorcey, Huntz Hall, Lyle Talbot	Comedy	Monogram
The Fighting Kentuckian	George Waggner	John Wayne, Oliver Hardy, Vera Ralston	Western	Republic
Fighting Man of the Plains	Edwin L. Marin	Randolph Scott, Jane Nigh, Bill Williams	Western	20th Century Fox
The Fighting O'Flynn	Arthur Pierson	Douglas Fairbanks Jr., Helena Carter, Richard Greene	Adventure	Universal
The Fighting Redhead	Lewis D. Collins	Jim Bannon, Emmett Lynn, Peggy Stewart	Western	Eagle-Lion
Flame of Youth	R. G. Springsteen	Barbra Fuller, Danny Sue Nolan, Don Beddoe	Drama	Republic
Flaming Fury	George Blair	George Cooper, Roy Roberts, Paul Marion	Crime	Republic
Flamingo Road	Michael Curtiz	Joan Crawford, Zachary Scott, Sydney Greenstreet	Drama	Warner Bros.; based on the play
Flaxy Martin	Richard L. Bare	Virginia Mayo, Dorothy Malone, Zachary Scott	Drama	Warner Bros.
Follow Me Quietly	Richard Fleischer	William Lundigan, Dorothy Patrick, Jeff Corey	Film Noir	RKO
The Forbidden Street	Jean Negulesco	Maureen O'Hara, Dana Andrews, Sybil Thorndike	Drama	Fox
Forgotten Women	William Beaudine	Elyse Knox, Edward Norris, Robert Shayne	Drama	Monogram
The Fountainhead	King Vidor	Gary Cooper, Patricia Neal, Raymond Massey	Drama	Warner Bros.; based on Ayn Rand novel
Free for All	Charles Barton	Robert Cummings, Ann Blyth, Percy Kilbride	Comedy	Universal
Frontier Investigator	Fred C. Brannon	Allan Lane, Gail Davis, Eddy Waller	Western	Republic
The Gal Who Took the West	Frederick de Cordova	Yvonne De Carlo, Scott Brady, Charles Coburn	Western	Universal
The Gay Amigo	Wallace Fox	Duncan Renaldo, Armida, Leo Carrillo	Western	United Artists. Cisco Kid
The Girl from Jones Beach	Peter Godfrey	Ronald Reagan, Virginia Mayo, Eddie Bracken	Comedy	Warner Bros.
The Golden Stallion	William Witney	Roy Rogers, Dale Evans, Estelita Rodriguez	Western	Republic
The Great Dan Patch	Joseph M. Newman	Dennis O'Keefe, Gail Russell, Ruth Warrick	Drama	United Artists
The Great Gatsby	Elliott Nugent	Alan Ladd, Ruth Hussey, Betty Field	Drama	Paramount. Based on F. Scott Fitzgerald novel; remade in 1974 and 2013
The Great Lover	Alexander Hall	Bob Hope, Rhonda Fleming, Roland Young	Comedy	Paramount
The Great Sinner	Robert Siodmak	Gregory Peck, Ava Gardner, Melvyn Douglas	Drama	MGM
Gun Law Justice	Lambert Hillyer	Jimmy Wakely, Jane Adams, Dub Taylor	Western	Monogram
Gun Runner	Lambert Hillyer	Jimmy Wakely, Noel Neill, Mae Clarke	Western	Monogram
The Hasty Heart	Vincent Sherman	Ronald Reagan, Patricia Neal, Richard Todd	Drama	Warner Bros.
The Heiress	William Wyler	Olivia de Havilland, Montgomery Clift, Ralph Richardson	Drama	Paramount; won 4 Academy Awards
Hellfire	R. G. Springsteen	Wild Bill Elliott, Marie Windsor, Forrest Tucker	Western	Republic
Hideout	Philip Ford	Lloyd Bridges, Lorna Gray, Sheila Ryan	Thriller	Republic
Hold That Baby!	Reginald LeBorg	Leo Gorcey, Huntz Hall, Gabriel Dell	Comedy	Monogram
Holiday Affair	Don Hartman	Robert Mitchum, Janet Leigh, Wendell Corey	Romantic comedy	RKO;
Holiday in Havana	Jean Yarborough	Desi Arnaz, Mary Hatcher, Ann Doran	Musical comedy	Columbia
Home in San Antone	Ray Nazarro	Roy Acuff, Lyn Thomas, George Cleveland	Western musical	Columbia
Home of the Brave	Mark Robson	Jeff Corey, Lloyd Bridges, James Edwards	Drama	United Artists
Homicide	Felix Jacoves	Robert Douglas, Helen Westcott, Monte Blue	Crime	Warner Bros.
Horsemen of the Sierras	Fred F. Sears	Charles Starrett, Smiley Burnette, Lois Hall	Western	Columbia
The House Across the Street	Richard L. Bare	Wayne Morris, Janis Paige, Bruce Bennett	Comedy	Warner Bros.
House of Strangers	Joseph L. Mankiewicz	Edward G. Robinson, Susan Hayward, Richard Conte	Crime drama	20th Century Fox

== I-J ==
Title	Director	Cast	Genre	Notes
I Cheated the Law	Edward L. Cahn	Tom Conway, Steve Brodie, Barbara Billingsley	Crime	20th Century Fox
I Married a Communist	Robert Stevenson	Laraine Day, Robert Ryan, John Agar	Drama	RKO. aka The Woman on Pier 13
I Shot Jesse James	Samuel Fuller	Preston Foster, John Ireland, Barbara Britton	Western	Lippert
I Was a Male War Bride	Howard Hawks	Cary Grant, Ann Sheridan, Marion Marshall	Comedy	20th Century Fox
Illegal Entry	Frederick de Cordova	Märta Torén, Howard Duff, George Brent	Film noir	Universal
Impact	Arthur Lubin	Brian Donlevy, Ella Raines, Charles Coburn	Film noir	United Artists
In the Good Old Summertime	Robert Z. Leonard	Judy Garland, Van Johnson, Buster Keaton	Comedy	MGM
The Inspector General	Henry Koster	Danny Kaye, Walter Slezak, Barbara Bates	Musical comedy	Warner Bros. Golden Globe Best Original Score
Intruder in the Dust	Clarence Brown	Juano Hernandez, David Brian, Claude Jarman Jr.	Drama	MGM
It Happens Every Spring	Lloyd Bacon	Ray Milland, Jean Peters, Paul Douglas	Comedy	20th Century Fox
It's a Great Feeling	David Butler	Doris Day, Jack Carson, Dennis Morgan	Comedy	Warner Bros. Academy Award for Best Song
Jiggs and Maggie in Jackpot Jitters	William Beaudine	Joe Yule, Renie Riano, George McManus	Comedy	Monogram
Jigsaw	Fletcher Markle	Franchot Tone, Jean Wallace, Marc Lawrence	Film noir	United Artists
Joe Palooka in the Big Fight	Cy Endfield	Leon Errol, Joe Kirkwood, Lina Romay	Comedy	Monogram
Joe Palooka in the Counterpunch	Reginald LeBorg	Leon Errol, Joe Kirkwood, Elyse Knox	Comedy	Monogram
John Loves Mary	David Butler	Ronald Reagan, Jack Carson, Wayne Morris, Patricia Neal	Comedy	Warner Bros.
Johnny Allegro	Ted Tetzlaff	George Raft, George Macready, Nina Foch	Crime	Columbia
Johnny Holiday	Willis Goldbeck	William Bendix, Hoagy Carmichael, Stanley Clements	Drama	United Artists
Johnny Stool Pigeon	William Castle	Shelley Winters, Howard Duff, Dan Duryea	Film noir	Universal
Jolson Sings Again	Henry Levin	Larry Parks, Barbara Hale, William Demarest	Biography	Columbia. Sequel to The Jolson Story
The Judge	Elmer Clifton	Milburn Stone, Katherine DeMille, Paul Guilfoyle	Crime	Film Classics
The Judge Steps Out	Boris Ingster	Ann Sothern, Alexander Knox George Tobias	Comedy	RKO

== K-L ==
Title	Director	Cast	Genre	Notes
Kazan	Will Jason	Stephen Dunne, Lois Maxwell, Roman Bohnen	Western	Columbia
The Kid from Cleveland	Herbert Kline	George Brent, Lynn Bari, Tommy Cook	Sports drama	Republic
A Kiss for Corliss	Richard Wallace	Shirley Temple, David Niven, Virginia Welles	Comedy	United Artists
A Kiss in the Dark	Delmer Daves	Jane Wyman, David Niven, Broderick Crawford	Comedy	Warner Bros.
Knock on Any Door	Nicholas Ray	Humphrey Bogart, John Derek, George Macready	Drama	Columbia; from Willard Motley novel
Ladies of the Chorus	Phil Karlson	Adele Jergens, Marilyn Monroe, Rand Brooks	Musical	Columbia
The Lady Gambles	Michael Gordon	Barbara Stanwyck, Robert Preston, Stephen McNally	Drama	Universal
The Lady Takes a Sailor	Michael Curtiz	Jane Wyman, Dennis Morgan, Eve Arden	Comedy	Warner Bros.
Laramie	Ray Nazarro	Charles Starrett, Fred F. Sears, Tommy Ivo	Western	Columbia; Became TV series
The Last Bandit	Joseph Kane	Bill Elliott, Lorna Gray, Forrest Tucker	Western	Republic
Law of the Barbary Coast	Lew Landers	Gloria Henry, Stephen Dunne, Adele Jergens	Crime	Columbia
Law of the Golden West	Philip Ford	Monte Hale, Gail Davis, Paul Hurst	Western	Republic
Law of the West	Ray Taylor	Johnny Mack Brown, Max Terhune, Jack Ingram	Western	Monogram
Lawless Code	Oliver Drake	Jimmy Wakely, Dub Taylor, Ellen Hall	Western	Monogram
A Letter to Three Wives	Joseph L. Mankiewicz	Linda Darnell, Ann Sothern, Jeanne Crain	Drama	20th Century Fox; won 2 Academy Awards
The Life of Riley	Irving Brecher	William Bendix, Rosemary DeCamp, James Gleason	Comedy	Universal
Little Women	Mervyn LeRoy	Elizabeth Taylor, Margaret O'Brien, June Allyson	Family	MGM; from Louisa May Alcott novel
The Lone Wolf and His Lady	John Hoffman	Ron Randell, June Vincent, Alan Mowbray	Mystery	Columbia. Last of series
Look for the Silver Lining	David Butler	June Haver, Ray Bolger, Charlie Ruggles	Musical	Warner Bros.
Lost Boundaries	Alfred L. Werker	Beatrice Pearson, Mel Ferrer, Susan Douglas	Drama	Film Classics
The Lost Tribe	William Berke	Johnny Weissmuller, Elena Verdugo, Myrna Dell	Adventure	Columbia. Jungle Jim
The Lovable Cheat	Richard Oswald	Charles Ruggles, Peggy Ann Garner, Richard Ney	Comedy	Film Classics
Love Happy	David Miller	Marx Brothers, Vera-Ellen, Ilona Massey	Comedy	United Artists; final Marx Bros. film
The Lucky Stiff	Lewis R. Foster	Dorothy Lamour, Claire Trevor, Brian Donlevy	Comedy	United Artists; produced by Jack Benny
Lust for Gold	S. Sylvan Simon	Glenn Ford, Ida Lupino, Gig Young	Western	Columbia

== M-N ==
Title	Director	Cast	Genre	Notes
Ma and Pa Kettle	Charles Lamont	Marjorie Main, Percy Kilbride, Meg Randall	Comedy	Universal. The Egg and I sequel
Madame Bovary	Vincente Minnelli	Jennifer Jones, James Mason, Van Heflin	Drama	MGM. From Gustave Flaubert novel
Make Believe Ballroom	Joseph Santley	Ruth Warrick, Ron Randell, Virginia Welles	Drama	Columbia
Make Mine Laughs	Richard Fleischer	Ray Bolger, Joan Davis, Dennis Day	Musical	RKO
Malaya	Richard Thorpe	Spencer Tracy, James Stewart, Sydney Greenstreet	Thriller	MGM
The Man on the Eiffel Tower	Burgess Meredith	Charles Laughton, Franchot Tone, Burgess Meredith	Mystery	RKO; Co-production with France
Manhandled	Lewis R. Foster	Dorothy Lamour, Dan Duryea, Sterling Hayden	Film noir	Paramount
Manhattan Angel	Arthur Dreifuss	Gloria Jean, Patricia Barry, Thurston Hall	Musical comedy	Columbia
Mary Ryan, Detective	Abby Berlin	Marsha Hunt, John Litel, June Vincent	Crime Drama	Columbia
Masked Raiders	Lesley Selander	Tim Holt, Marjorie Lord, Richard Martin	Western	RKO
Massacre River	John Rawlins	Guy Madison, Rory Calhoun, Carole Mathews	Western	Monogram
Master Minds	Jean Yarbrough	Leo Gorcey, Huntz Hall, Gabriel Dell	Comedy horror	Monogram
Mighty Joe Young	Ernest B. Schoedsack	Terry Moore, Robert Armstrong, Ben Johnson	Adventure	RKO
Miss Grant Takes Richmond	Lloyd Bacon	Lucille Ball, William Holden, Janis Carter	Comedy	Columbia
Miss Mink of 1949	Glenn Tryon	Jimmy Lydon, Lois Collier, Barbara Brown	Comedy	20th Century Fox
Mother Is a Freshman	Lloyd Bacon	Loretta Young, Van Johnson, Rudy Vallée	Comedy	20th Century Fox
Mr. Belvedere Goes to College	Elliott Nugent	Clifton Webb, Shirley Temple, Tom Drake	Comedy	20th Century Fox; sequel to Sitting Pretty
Mr. Soft Touch	Gordon Douglas	Glenn Ford, Evelyn Keyes, John Ireland	Film noir	Columbia
Mrs. Mike	Louis King	Dick Powell, Evelyn Keyes, Angela Clarke	Drama	United Artists
The Mutineers	Jean Yarbrough	Jon Hall, Adele Jergens, George Reeves	Adventure	Columbia
My Dream Is Yours	Michael Curtiz	Doris Day, Jack Carson, Eve Arden	Musical	Warner Bros.
My Foolish Heart	Mark Robson	Susan Hayward, Dana Andrews, Kent Smith	Drama	RKO. 2 Oscar nominations
My Friend Irma	George Marshall	Dean Martin, Jerry Lewis, Marie Wilson	Comedy	Paramount; 1st Martin and Lewis film
My Own True Love	Compton Bennett	Phyllis Calvert, Melvyn Douglas, Wanda Hendrix	Drama	Paramount
The Mysterious Desperado	Lesley Selander	Tim Holt, Richard Martin, Movita Castaneda	Western	RKO
Navajo Trail Raiders	R. G. Springsteen	Allan Lane, Eddy Waller, Robert Emmett Keane	Western	Republic
Neptune's Daughter	Edward Buzzell	Esther Williams, Red Skelton, Ricardo Montalbán	Musical	MGM; Oscar for Best Song
Never Fear	Ida Lupino	Sally Forrest, Hugh O'Brian, Keefe Brasselle	Drama	Eagle-Lion
Night Unto Night	Don Siegel	Ronald Reagan, Viveca Lindfors, Broderick Crawford	Drama	Warner Bros.
Not Wanted	Elmer Clifton, Ida Lupino	Sally Forrest, Keefe Brasselle, Leo Penn	Drama	Film Classics

== O-R ==
Title	Director	Cast	Genre	Notes
Oh, You Beautiful Doll	John M. Stahl	Mark Stevens, June Haver, Gale Robbins	Musical	20th Century Fox
Once More, My Darling	Robert Montgomery	Robert Montgomery, Ann Blyth, Jane Cowl	Romantic comedy	Universal
One Last Fling	Peter Godfrey	Alexis Smith, Zachary Scott, Douglas Kennedy	Comedy	Warner Bros.
On the Town	Stanley Donen, Gene Kelly	Gene Kelly, Frank Sinatra, Ann Miller, Betty Garrett	Musical	MGM; Oscar for Best Musical Score
Outcasts of the Trail	Philip Ford	Monte Hale, Jeff Donnell, Paul Hurst	Western	Republic
Outpost in Morocco	Robert Florey	George Raft, Marie Windsor, Akim Tamiroff	Adventure	United Artists
Pinky	Elia Kazan	Jeanne Crain, Ethel Barrymore, Ethel Waters	Drama	20th Century Fox. 3 Oscar nominations
Pioneer Marshal	Philip Ford	Monte Hale, Paul Hurst, Nan Leslie	Western	Republic
The Pirates of Capri	Edgar G. Ulmer	Louis Hayward, Binnie Barnes, Mariella Lotti	Adventure	Film Classics
Post Office Investigator	George Blair	Audrey Long, Warren Douglas, Jeff Donnell	Mystery	Republic
Port of New York	László Benedek	Scott Brady, K. T. Stevens, Yul Brynner	Film noir	Eagle-Lion
Powder River Rustlers	Philip Ford	Allan Lane, Eddy Waller, Roy Barcroft	Western	Republic
Prince of Foxes	Henry King	Tyrone Power, Orson Welles, Wanda Hendrix	Historical	20th Century Fox
Prince of the Plains	Philip Ford	Monte Hale, Paul Hurst, Roy Barcroft	Western	Republic
Prison Warden	Seymour Friedman	Warner Baxter, Anna Lee, Harlan Warde	Crime	Columbia
Range Justice	Ray Taylor	Johnny Mack Brown, Max Terhune, Riley Hill	Western	Monogram
Ranger of Cherokee Strip	Philip Ford	Monte Hale, Paul Hurst, Roy Barcroft	Western	Republic
The Reckless Moment	Max Ophüls	James Mason, Joan Bennett, Geraldine Brooks	Film noir	Columbia
Red Canyon	George Sherman	Ann Blyth, Howard Duff, George Brent	Western	Universal
The Red Danube	George Sidney	Peter Lawford, Janet Leigh, Angela Lansbury	Drama	MGM
Red, Hot and Blue	John Farrow	Betty Hutton, Victor Mature, William Demarest	Musical comedy	Paramount
Red Light	Roy Del Ruth	George Raft, Virginia Mayo, Raymond Burr	Film noir	United Artists
The Red Menace	R. G. Springsteen	Robert Rockwell, Betty Lou Gerson, Barbra Fuller	Film noir	Republic
The Red Pony	Lewis Milestone	Myrna Loy, Robert Mitchum, Louis Calhern	Western drama	Republic
Red Rock Outlaw	Elmer Clifton	Lee "Lasses" White, Reno Browne, Ewing Miles Brown	Western	Astor
Red Stallion in the Rockies	Ralph Murphy	Jean Heather, Arthur Franz, Ray Collins	Western	Eagle-Lion
Reign of Terror	Anthony Mann	Robert Cummings, Arlene Dahl, Richard Basehart	Historical thriller	Eagle-Lion
Renegades of the Sage	Ray Nazarro	Charles Starrett, Smiley Burnette, Leslie Banning	Western	Columbia
Ride, Ryder, Ride!	Lewis D. Collins	Jim Bannon, Don Reynolds, Emmett Lynn	Western	Eagle-Lion
Riders in the Sky	John English	Gene Autry, Gloria Henry, Mary Beth Hughes	Western	Columbia
Riders of the Range	Lesley Selander	Tim Holt, Richard Martin, Jacqueline White	Western	RKO
Riders of the Whistling Pines	John English	Gene Autry, Patricia Barry, Jimmy Lloyd	Western	Columbia
Rimfire	B. Reeves Eason	Mary Beth Hughes, James Millican, Reed Hadley	Western	Lippert
Rim of the Canyon	John English	Gene Autry, Thurston Hall, Clem Bevans	Western	Columbia
Ringside	Frank McDonald	Don "Red" Barry, Tom Brown, Sheila Ryan	Film noir	Lippert
Roaring Westward	Oliver Drake	Jimmy Wakely, Lois Hall, Dennis Moore	Western	Monogram
Roll, Thunder, Roll!	Lewis D. Collins	Jim Bannon, Don Reynolds, Emmett Lynn	Western	Eagle-Lion
Rope of Sand	William Dieterle	Burt Lancaster, Paul Henreid, Claude Rains	Adventure	Paramount
Roseanna McCoy	Irving Reis	Farley Granger, Joan Evans, Raymond Massey	Drama	RKO
Rose of the Yukon	George Blair	Myrna Dell, Steve Brodie, Emory Parnell	Western	Republic
Roughshod	Mark Robson	Gloria Grahame, Robert Sterling, John Ireland	Western	RKO
Rustlers	Lesley Selander	Tim Holt, Richard Martin, Martha Hyer	Western	RKO
Rusty's Birthday	Seymour Friedman	Ted Donaldson, John Litel, Ann Doran	Drama	Columbia
Rusty Saves a Life	Seymour Friedman	Ted Donaldson, John Litel, Ann Doran	Drama	Columbia

== S-T ==
Title	Director	Cast	Genre	Notes
Samson and Delilah	Cecil B. DeMille	Hedy Lamarr, Victor Mature, Angela Lansbury	Biblical, Drama	Paramount. 5 Oscar nominations
San Antone Ambush	Philip Ford	Monte Hale, Paul Hurst, Roy Barcroft	Western	Republic
Sand	Henry King	Coleen Gray, Mark Stevens, Rory Calhoun	Western	20th Century Fox. Oscar-nominated
Sands of Iwo Jima	Allan Dwan	John Wayne, John Agar, Forrest Tucker	War	Republic. 4 Oscar nominations
Satan's Cradle	Ford Beebe	Duncan Renaldo, Ann Savage, Leo Carrillo	Western	United Artists
Scene of the Crime	Roy Rowland	Van Johnson, Arlene Dahl, Gloria DeHaven	Film noir	MGM
Search for Danger	Jack Bernhard	John Calvert, Albert Dekker, Myrna Dell	Crime	Film Classics
The Secret Garden	Fred M. Wilcox	Margaret O'Brien, Herbert Marshall, Dean Stockwell	Drama	MGM
The Secret of St. Ives	Phil Rosen	Richard Ney, Vanessa Brown, Henry Daniell	Adventure	Columbia
The Set-Up	Robert Wise	Robert Ryan, Audrey Totter, Alan Baxter	Sports Film noir	RKO. From W. C. Heinz novel
Shamrock Hill	Arthur Dreifuss	Peggy Ryan, Trudy Marshall, Rick Vallin	Comedy	Eagle-Lion
She Shoulda Said No!	Sherman Scott	Alan Baxter, Lila Leeds, Lyle Talbot	Drama	Independent
She Wore a Yellow Ribbon	John Ford	John Wayne, Joanne Dru, Ben Johnson	Western	RKO. Oscar for cinematography
Sheriff of Wichita	R. G. Springsteen	Allan Lane, Lyn Wilde, Roy Barcroft	Western	Republic
Shockproof	Douglas Sirk	Cornel Wilde, Patricia Knight, John Baragrey	Film noir	Columbia
Siren of Atlantis	Gregg G. Tallas	Maria Montez, Jean-Pierre Aumont, Dennis O'Keefe	Adventure	United Artists
Sky Dragon	Lesley Selander	Roland Winters, Noel Neill, Keye Luke	Mystery	Monogram. Charlie Chan
Slattery's Hurricane	André de Toth	Richard Widmark, Linda Darnell, Veronica Lake	Drama	20th Century Fox. From Herman Wouk story
Slightly French	Douglas Sirk	Dorothy Lamour, Don Ameche, Janis Carter	Comedy	Columbia
So Dear to My Heart	Harold D. Schuster	Burl Ives, Beulah Bondi, Harry Carey	Animation	Disney
Song of India	Albert S. Rogell	Sabu, Turhan Bey, Gail Russell	Adventure	Columbia
Song of Surrender	Mitchell Leisen	Wanda Hendrix, Claude Rains, Andrea King	Drama	Paramount
Sons of New Mexico	John English	Gene Autry, Gail Davis, Robert Armstrong	Western	Columbia
Sorrowful Jones	Sidney Lanfield	Bob Hope, Lucille Ball, Bruce Cabot	Comedy	Paramount. Damon Runyon story; remake of 1934 film
South of Death Valley	Ray Nazarro	Charles Starrett, Gail Davis, Lee Roberts	Western	Columbia
South of Rio	Philip Ford	Monte Hale, Kay Christopher, Paul Hurst	Western	Republic
South of St. Louis	Ray Enright	Joel McCrea, Zachary Scott, Victor Jory	Western	Warner Bros.
Special Agent	William C. Thomas	William Eythe, Kasey Rogers, Carole Mathews	Film noir	Paramount
Square Dance Jubilee	Paul Landres	Don "Red" Barry, Mary Beth Hughes, Wally Vernon	Musical, Western	Lippert
Stagecoach Kid	Lew Landers	Tim Holt, Richard Martin, Jeff Donnell	Western	RKO
Stampede	Lesley Selander	Rod Cameron, Gale Storm, Johnny Mack Brown	Western	Allied Artists; Remake of 1936 film
State Department: File 649	Sam Newfield	Virginia Bruce, William Lundigan, Jonathan Hale	Film noir	Film Classics
Strange Bargain	Will Price	Martha Scott, Jeffrey Lynn, Harry Morgan	Film noir	RKO
The Stratton Story	Sam Wood	James Stewart, June Allyson, Frank Morgan	Sports	MGM. Biography of Monty Stratton
Streets of Laredo	Leslie Fenton	William Holden, William Bendix, Macdonald Carey	Western	Paramount; remake of The Texas Rangers
Streets of San Francisco	George Blair	Robert Armstrong, Mae Clarke, Wally Cassell	Crime	Republic
The Story of Molly X	Crane Wilbur	June Havoc, John Russell, Dorothy Hart	Film noir	Universal
The Story of Seabiscuit	David Butler	Shirley Temple, Barry Fitzgerald, Rosemary DeCamp	Sports	Warner Bros.
The Sun Comes Up	Richard Thorpe	Jeanette MacDonald, Lloyd Nolan, Claude Jarman Jr.	Family	MGM. Lassie feature
Susanna Pass	William Witney	Roy Rogers, Dale Evans, Estelita Rodriguez	Western	Republic
Sword in the Desert	George Sherman	Dana Andrews, Märta Torén, Stephen McNally	War	Universal
Take Me Out to the Ball Game	Busby Berkeley	Frank Sinatra, Esther Williams, Gene Kelly	Sports musical	MGM
Take One False Step	Chester Erskine	Shelley Winters, William Powell, Marsha Hunt	Film noir	Universal
Tarzan's Magic Fountain	Lee Sholem	Lex Barker, Brenda Joyce, Evelyn Ankers	Adventure	RKO
Task Force	Delmer Daves	Gary Cooper, Jane Wyatt, Walter Brennan	War	Warner Bros. 8th Cooper-Brennan pairing
Tell It to the Judge	Norman Foster	Rosalind Russell, Robert Cummings, Gig Young	Comedy	Columbia
Tension	John Berry	Richard Basehart, Audrey Totter, Cyd Charisse	Film noir	MGM
That Forsyte Woman	Compton Bennett	Errol Flynn, Greer Garson, Walter Pidgeon	Drama	MGM; from book by John Galsworthy
That Midnight Kiss	Norman Taurog	Kathryn Grayson, Mario Lanza, José Iturbi	Musical	MGM
There's a Girl in My Heart	Arthur Dreifuss	Lee Bowman, Elyse Knox, Gloria Jean	Musical	Allied Artists
They Live by Night	Nicholas Ray	Farley Granger, Cathy O'Donnell, Howard Da Silva	Film noir	RKO; Ray's 1st film; from novel Thieves Like Us
Thieves' Highway	Jules Dassin	Richard Conte, Valentina Cortese, Lee J. Cobb	Film noir	20th Century Fox
The Threat	Felix E. Feist	Michael O'Shea, Virginia Grey, Charles McGraw	Film noir	RKO
Top o' the Morning	David Miller	Bing Crosby, Ann Blyth, Barry Fitzgerald	Comedy	Paramount
Tokyo Joe	Stuart Heisler	Humphrey Bogart, Florence Marly, Sessue Hayakawa	War	Columbia
Too Late for Tears	Byron Haskin	Lizabeth Scott, Dan Duryea, Don DeFore	Film noir	United Artists
Tough Assignment	William Beaudine	Don Barry, Marjorie Steele, Steve Brodie	Film noir	Lippert
Trail of the Yukon	William Beaudine	Kirby Grant, Suzanne Dalbert, Iris Adrian	Western	Monogram; Corporal Rod Webb series
Trails End	Lambert Hillyer	Johnny Mack Brown, Max Terhune, Kay Morley	Western	Monogram
Trapped	Richard Fleischer	Lloyd Bridges, Barbara Payton, John Hoyt	Film noir	Eagle-Lion
Treasure of Monte Cristo	William Berke	Glenn Langan, Adele Jergens, Steve Brodie	Film noir	Lippert
Tucson	William F. Claxton	Jimmy Lydon, Penny Edwards, Charles Russell	Drama	20th Century Fox
Tulsa	Stuart Heisler	Susan Hayward, Robert Preston, Pedro Armendáriz	Drama	Eagle-Lion
Tuna Clipper	William Beaudine	Roddy McDowall, Elena Verdugo, Roland Winters	Drama	Monogram
Twelve O'Clock High	Henry King	Gregory Peck, Gary Merrill, Dean Jagger	War	20th Century Fox. Oscar for Jagger

== U-Z ==
Title	Director	Cast	Genre	Notes
The Undercover Man	Joseph H. Lewis	Glenn Ford, Nina Foch, James Whitmore	Crime drama	Columbia
Undertow	William Castle	Scott Brady, John Russell, Dorothy Hart, Peggy Dow	Film noir	Universal
The Walking Hills	John Sturges	Randolph Scott, Ella Raines, William Bishop	Western	Columbia
We Were Strangers	John Huston	Jennifer Jones, John Garfield, Pedro Armendáriz	Adventure	Columbia
West of El Dorado	Ray Taylor	Johnny Mack Brown, Max Terhune, Reno Browne	Western	Monogram
Western Renegades	Wallace Fox	Johnny Mack Brown, Max Terhune, Jane Adams	Western	Monogram
White Heat	Raoul Walsh	James Cagney, Virginia Mayo, Edmond O'Brien, Steve Cochran	Film noir	Warner Bros.
Wicked City	François Villiers	Maria Montez, Jean-Pierre Aumont, Lilli Palmer	Drama	United Artists. Co-production with France
The Window	Ted Tetzlaff	Bobby Driscoll, Barbara Hale, Ruth Roman	Drama	RKO
Without Honor	Irving Pichel	Laraine Day, Dane Clark, Franchot Tone	Drama	United Artists
The Wolf Hunters	Budd Boetticher	Kirby Grant, Jan Clayton, Helen Parrish	Western	Monogram; Corporal Rod Webb series
A Woman's Secret	Nicholas Ray	Maureen O'Hara, Melvyn Douglas, Gloria Grahame	Film noir	RKO
The Wyoming Bandit	Philip Ford	Allan Lane, Eddy Waller, Trevor Bardette	Western	Republic
Yes Sir, That's My Baby	George Sherman	Donald O'Connor, Gloria DeHaven, Charles Coburn	Musical	Universal
The Younger Brothers	Edwin L. Marin	Wayne Morris, Bruce Bennett, Janis Paige	Western	Warner Bros.
You're My Everything	Walter Lang	Dan Dailey, Anne Baxter, Anne Revere	Musical	20th Century Fox

== Serials ==
Title	Director	Cast	Genre	Notes
Adventures of Sir Galahad	Spencer Gordon Bennet	George Reeves, Lois Hall	Serial	Republic
Batman and Robin	S.G. Bennet	Robert Lowery, Johnny Duncan, Jane Adams	Serial	
Bruce Gentry – Daredevil of the Skies	Spencer Bennet	Tom Neal, Judy Clark	Serial	Republic
Federal Agents vs. Underworld, Inc		Kirk Alyn, Rosemary LaPlanche	Serial	
Ghost of Zorro	Fred C. Brannon	Clayton Moore, Pamela Blake	Serial	Republic
King of the Rocket Men	Fred C. Brannon	Tristram Coffin, Mae Clarke, Don Haggerty	Serial	Republic
Radar Patrol vs. Spy King		Kirk Alyn	Serial	

== Shorts ==
Title	Director	Cast	Genre	Notes
Awful Orphan	Chuck Jones		Animated	
The Cat and the Mermouse		Tom and Jerry	Animated	
Dating Do's and Don'ts				
Dunked in the Deep	Jules White	The Three Stooges	Short subject	
For Scent-imental Reasons			Animated	
Frigid Hare		Bugs Bunny	Animated	
High Diving Hare		Bugs Bunny	Animated	
Malice in the Palace	Jules White	The Three Stooges	Slapstick	
Jerry's Diary		Tom and Jerry	Animated	
Long-Haired Hare		Bugs Bunny	Animated	
Love That Pup		Tom and Jerry	Animated	
Mississippi Hare		Bugs Bunny	Animated	
Porky in Wackyland		Porky Pig	Animated	
Rabbit Hood		Bugs Bunny	Animated	
Rebel Rabbit		Bugs Bunny	Animated	
Technicolor for Industrial Films			Educational	
Tennis Chumps	Hanna-Barbera	Tom and Jerry	Animated	
Which Is Witch	Friz Freleng	Bugs Bunny	Animated	

== See also ==
- 1949 in the United States
