= Foy Willing =

American singer, songwriter, musician and bandleader (1914–1978)

- Born: Foy Lopez Willingham; May 14, 1914; Iredell, Texas, United States
- Died: July 24, 1978 (aged 64) Nashville, Tennessee, United States
- Genres: Country, western
- Occupations: Musician, actor
- Instrument: Vocals
- Years active: 1940–1978

Foy Willing (May 14, 1914 – July 24, 1978) was an American singer, songwriter, musician, and bandleader, who performed Western music and appeared in Western films. He formed the band Riders of the Purple Sage.

== Early years ==
Foy Lopez Willingham was born in Iredell, Texas, United States. He began his career while attending high school in Texas by working at a local radio station. In 1933, he traveled to New York City to further his radio career. In 1940, he moved to Oklahoma, and in 1942 to California where he became popular during the Golden Age of Radio.

== Riders of the Purple Sage ==
In 1942, Willing co-founded Foy Willing and the Riders of the Purple Sage, with Iowa musician Al Sloey. The band included Patti Page on vocals, fiddler Johnny Paul, and accordionist Ken Coopern. The band's first hit, "Texas Blues", was written by Willing. They grew in fame and over their ten-year career, performed as the musical group backing up Monte Hale and Roy Rogers for Republic Studios.

Willing and his band appeared as performers in many Western movies in the 1940s and early 1950s with Charles Starrett, Monte Hale, and Roy Rogers and Dale Evans. The Willing-led Riders of the Purple Sage disbanded in 1952.

== Later years ==
During the late 1950s and early 1960s, Foy Willing and the Riders of the Purple Sage occasionally reunited to record and perform, and Willing went on to appear at Western festivals during the 1970s. Willing also traveled with Gene Autry during Autry's North American tour. On October 30, 1963, Les Paul sued Mary Ford for divorce, in Hackensack, New Jersey, charging that Ford left Paul for Willing. In 1966, Willing married Sharon Lee.

Willing died on July 24, 1978, in Nashville, Tennessee, of a heart attack.

== Discography ==
- 2007 Tumbling Tumbleweeds (Varese Sarabande)
- 2005 And the Riders of the Purple Sage (BACM)
- 2005 Timber Trail (Cattle)
- 2005 Trail Herdin' Cowboy
- 2003 Sagebrush Swing (Collectors' Choice Music)
- 1999 Cowboy/New Sound of American Folk (DRG)
- 1998 Collectors Edition (Pickwick)
- 1962 The New Sound of American Folk
- 1958 Cowboy
- 1950 Riders of the Purple Sage

== Filmography ==
- 1951 "Texas Carnival"
- 1951 "Disc Jockey"
- 1951 Heart of the Rockies
- 1951 Spoilers of the Plains
- 1950 Trail of Robin Hood
- 1950 North of the Great Divide
- 1950 Sunset in the West
- 1950 Trigger, Jr.
- 1950 Twilight in the Sierras
- 1950 Bells of Coronado
- 1949 The Golden Stallion
- 1949 Down Dakota Way
- 1949 Susanna Pass
- 1948 The Far Frontier
- 1948 Grand Canyon Trail
- 1948 The Timber Trail
- 1948 California Firebrand
- 1947 Under Colorado Skies
- 1947 Along the Oregon Trail
- 1947 Last Frontier Uprising
- 1946 Out California Way
- 1945 Saddle Serenade
- 1945 Sing Me a Song of Texas
- 1944 Cyclone Prairie Rangers
- 1944 Cowboy from Lonesome River
- 1944 Swing in the Saddle
- 1944 Twilight on the Prairie
- 1944 Sundown Valley
- 1944 Cowboy Canteen
- 1943 Cowboy in the Clouds
- 1941 Royal Mounted Patrol
- 1941 Prairie Stranger
