= Under Colorado Skies =

1947 film by R. G. Springsteen

- Theatrical release poster
- Directed by: R. G. Springsteen
- Screenplay by: Louise Rousseau
- Produced by: Melville Tucker
- Starring: Monte Hale; Lorna Gray; Paul Hurst; William Haade; John Alvin; LeRoy Mason
- Cinematography: Alfred S. Keller
- Edited by: Arthur Roberts
- Music by: Mort Glickman
- Production company: Republic Pictures
- Distributed by: Republic Pictures
- Release date: December 15, 1947
- Running time: 65 minutes
- Country: United States
- Language: English

Under Colorado Skies is a 1947 American Western film directed by R. G. Springsteen, written by Louise Rousseau, and starring Monte Hale, Lorna Gray, Paul Hurst, William Haade, John Alvin and LeRoy Mason. It was released on December 15, 1947, by Republic Pictures.

== Cast ==
- Monte Hale as Monte Hale
- Lorna Gray as Julia Collins
- Paul Hurst as Lucky John Hawkins
- William Haade as Marlowe
- John Alvin as Jeff Collins
- LeRoy Mason as Faro
- Tom London as Sheriff Blanchard
- Steve Darrell as Henchman Clip
- Gene Evans as Henchman Red
- Ted Adams as Doc Thornhill
- Steve Raines as Henchman Pony
- Hank Patterson as Slim
- Foy Willing as Guitar Player Foy Willing
- Riders of the Purple Sage as Foy Willing Band
