= The Roaring Road =

The Roaring Road may refer to:

- The Roaring Road (1919 film), American silent action romance film
- The Roaring Road (1926 film), American silent action film
