= The Vanishing Westerner =

1950 film by Philip Ford

- Theatrical release poster
- Directed by: Philip Ford
- Screenplay by: Robert Creighton Williams
- Produced by: Melville Tucker
- Starring: Monte Hale; Paul Hurst; Aline Towne; Roy Barcroft; Arthur Space; Richard Anderson
- Cinematography: Ellis W. Carter
- Edited by: Richard L. Van Enger
- Music by: Stanley Wilson
- Production company: Republic Pictures
- Distributed by: Republic Pictures
- Release date: March 31, 1950
- Running time: 60 minutes
- Country: United States
- Language: English

The Vanishing Westerner is a 1950 American Western film directed by Philip Ford, written by Robert Creighton Williams and starring Monte Hale, Paul Hurst, Aline Towne, Roy Barcroft, Arthur Space and Richard Anderson. It was released on March 31, 1950 by Republic Pictures.

== Cast ==
- Monte Hale as Chris Adams
- Paul Hurst as Waldorf Worthington
- Aline Towne as Barbara
- Roy Barcroft as "Sand" Sanderson
- Arthur Space as Sheriff John Fast/Sir Cedric Fast
- Richard Anderson as Deputy Sheriff Jeff Jackson
- William Phipps as Bud Thurber
- Don Haggerty as Henchman Art
- Dick Curtis as Bartender
- Rand Brooks as Sanderson's First Victim
- Edmund Cobb as Mort
- Harold Goodwin as Howard Glumm
