= The Savage Horde =

1950 film by Joseph Kane

- Theatrical release poster
- Directed by: Joseph Kane
- Screenplay by: Kenneth Gamet
- Story by: Thames Williamson; Gerald Geraghty
- Produced by: Joseph Kane
- Starring: Wild Bill Elliott; Lorna Gray; Grant Withers; Barbra Fuller; Noah Beery, Jr. Jim Davis; Bob Steele
- Cinematography: Reggie Lanning
- Edited by: Arthur Roberts
- Music by: R. Dale Butts
- Production company: Republic Pictures
- Distributed by: Republic Pictures
- Release date: May 22, 1950 (United States)
- Running time: 90 minutes
- Country: United States
- Language: English

The Savage Horde is a 1950 American Western film directed by Joseph Kane, written by Kenneth Gamet, and starring Wild Bill Elliott, Lorna Gray, Grant Withers, Barbra Fuller, Noah Beery, Jr., Jim Davis and Bob Steele. It was released on May 22, 1950 by Republic Pictures.

== Plot ==
On the run from the U.S. Army in a small Utah town, John "Ringo" Baker becomes involved in a land feud between local ranchers while watching for the Army patrols closing in on him.

== Cast ==
- Wild Bill Elliott as John "Ringo" Baker
- Lorna Gray as Livvy Weston
- Grant Withers as Wade Proctor
- Barbra Fuller as Louise Cole
- Noah Beery, Jr. as Glenn Larrabee
- Jim Davis as Lt. Mike Baker
- Bob Steele as Dancer
- Douglass Dumbrille as Col. Price
- Will Wright as Judge Thomas Cole
- Roy Barcroft as Fergus
- Earle Hodgins as Buck Yallop
- Stuart Hamblen as Stuart
- Hal Taliaferro as Sgt. Gowdy
- Lloyd Ingraham as Sam Jeffries
- Marshall Reed as Henchman Polk
- Crane Whitley as Greb
- Charles Stevens as Morellis
- James Flavin as Guard
