= Along the Oregon Trail =

1947 film

- Theatrical release poster
- Directed by: R. G. Springsteen
- Screenplay by: Earle Snell
- Produced by: Melville Tucker
- Starring: Monte Hale; Lorna Gray; Clayton Moore; Roy Barcroft; Max Terhune; Will Wright
- Cinematography: Alfred S. Keller
- Edited by: Arthur Roberts
- Music by: Mort Glickman
- Production company: Republic Pictures
- Distributed by: Republic Pictures
- Release date: August 30, 1947
- Running time: 64 minutes
- Country: United States
- Language: English

Along the Oregon Trail is a 1947 American Western film directed by R. G. Springsteen and written by Earle Snell. The film stars Monte Hale, Lorna Gray, Clayton Moore, Roy Barcroft, Max Terhune and Will Wright. The film was released on August 30, 1947, by Republic Pictures.

== Cast ==
- Monte Hale as Monte Hale
- Lorna Gray as Sally Dunn
- Clayton Moore as Gregg Thurston
- Roy Barcroft as Jake Stoner
- Max Terhune as Max Terhune
- Will Wright as Jim Bridger
- Wade Crosby as Blacksmith Tom
- LeRoy Mason as Lieutenant John Fremont
- Tom London as Wagon Boss
- Forrest Taylor as Kit Carson
- Foy Willing as Guitar Player / Singer
- Riders of the Purple Sage as Musicians
