= Out California Way =

1946 film

- Directed by: Lesley Selander
- Written by: Betty Burbridge & Barry Shipman
- Produced by: Louis Gray
- Starring: Monte Hale; Lorna Gray; Robert Blake
- Cinematography: Bud Thackery
- Edited by: Charles Craft
- Music by: Nathan Scott
- Production company: Republic Pictures
- Distributed by: Republic Pictures
- Release date: December 5, 1946
- Running time: 67 minutes
- Country: United States
- Language: English

Out California Way is a 1946 American Western musical film directed by Lesley Selander for Republic Pictures. It starred Monte Hale, Lorna Gray (billed as Adrian Booth) and Robert Blake. Roy Rogers and Dale Evans made cameo appearances. The film was the first feature to be shot in Trucolor.

== Plot ==
Unemployed Monte Hale meets Gloria McCoy and her brother Danny who is trying to get his horse, Pardner, into films. Monte finds that Pardner will dance while he sings and they take their act to a studio which gives them both parts in a Western musical. Monte has a jealous rival called Rod Mason who causes an explosion while Monte and Pardner are shooting a scene. The horse is scared and will no longer perform. After Monte wins a fistfight with his rival, Roy Rogers and Dale Evans arrive on set with Trigger. They sing a song with Trigger dancing and this inspires Pardner to dance again.

== Cast ==
- Monte Hale as Monte
- Lorna Gray as Gloria McCoy (billed as Adrian Booth)
- Robert Blake as Danny McCoy
- John Dehner as Rod Mason
- Nolan Leary as George Sheridan
- Fred Graham as Ace Hanlon
- Tom London as Johnny
- Edward Keane as E. J. Pearson
- Robert J. Wilke as Nate

=== Cameos (as themselves) ===
- Roy Rogers
- Dale Evans
- Don 'Red' Barry
- Allan Lane
- Jimmy Starr
- Foy Willing and the Riders of the Purple Sage
- St Luke's Episcopal Church Choristers
