= Home on the Range (1946 film) =

1946 film

- Theatrical release poster
- Directed by: R. G. Springsteen
- Screenplay by: Betty Burbridge
- Story by: Betty Burbridge; Bernard McConville
- Produced by: Louis Gray
- Starring: Monte Hale; Lorna Gray; Bob Nolan; Tom Chatterton; Robert Blake; LeRoy Mason
- Cinematography: Marcel Le Picard
- Edited by: Charles Craft
- Music by: R. Dale Butts; Mort Glickman
- Production company: Republic Pictures
- Distributed by: Republic Pictures
- Release date: April 18, 1946
- Running time: 55 minutes
- Country: United States
- Language: English

Home on the Range is a 1946 American Western film directed by R. G. Springsteen and written by Betty Burbridge. The film stars Monte Hale, Lorna Gray, Bob Nolan, Tom Chatterton, Robert Blake and LeRoy Mason. The film was released on April 18, 1946, by Republic Pictures.

== Plot ==
When two brothers settle a wilderness, one builds the largest cattle ranch in the state while the other creates a game preserve to protect the wild life. When Grizzly's brother dies, Bonnie takes over and soon finds that the bears are killing her cattle. Bonnie starts hunting bears, but she does not know that Dan is behind the attacks on her cattle with a caged bear. Dan wants to take over Grizzly's land. Monte is working for Grizzly to protect the wild animals until Grizzly can donate the land to the government as a preserve.

== Cast ==
- Monte Hale as Monte Hale
- Lorna Gray as Bonnie Garth
- Bob Nolan as Bob
- Sons of the Pioneers as Ranch Hands / Musicians
- Tom Chatterton as Grizzly Garth
- Robert Blake as Cub Garth
- LeRoy Mason as Dan
- Roy Barcroft as Henchman
- Kenne Duncan as Henchman
- Budd Buster as Sheriff
- Jack Kirk as Rancher Benson
- John Hamilton as State Official
