= California Firebrand =

1948 film by Philip Ford

- Theatrical release poster
- Directed by: Philip Ford
- Screenplay by: J. Benton Cheney; John K. Butler; Royal K. Cole
- Produced by: Melville Tucker
- Starring: Monte Hale; Lorna Gray; Paul Hurst; Alice Tyrrell; Tristram Coffin; LeRoy Mason
- Cinematography: Reggie Lanning
- Edited by: Tony Martinelli
- Music by: Mort Glickman
- Production company: Republic Pictures
- Distributed by: Republic Pictures
- Release date: April 1, 1948
- Running time: 63 minutes
- Country: United States
- Language: English

California Firebrand is a 1948 American Western film directed by Philip Ford and written by J. Benton Cheney, John K. Butler and Royal K. Cole. The film stars Monte Hale, Lorna Gray, Paul Hurst, Alice Tyrrell, Tristram Coffin and LeRoy Mason. The film was released on April 1, 1948 by Republic Pictures.

== Cast ==
- Monte Hale as Monte Hale
- Lorna Gray as Joyce Mason
- Paul Hurst as Chuck Waggoner
- Alice Tyrrell as Dulcey Waggoner
- Tristram Coffin as Jim Requa aka Jud Babbit
- LeRoy Mason as Luke Hartell
- Douglas Evans as Lance Dawson
- Sarah Edwards as Granny Hortense Mason
- Dan Sheridan as Gunsmoke Lowery
- Duke York as Chad Mason
- Lanny Rees as Rick Mason
- Foy Willing as Guitar Player Foy Willing
- Riders of the Purple Sage as Musicians
