= The Great Mr. Nobody =

1941 film by Benjamin Stoloff

- Directed by: Benjamin Stoloff
- Screenplay by: Ben Markson; Kenneth Gamet
- Based on: The Stuff of Heroes; 1924 story in American Magazine by Harold Titus
- Produced by: William Jacobs
- Starring: Eddie Albert; Joan Leslie; Alan Hale, Sr. William Lundigan; John Litel; Charles Trowbridge; Paul Hurst
- Cinematography: Arthur L. Todd
- Edited by: Rudi Fehr
- Music by: Adolph Deutsch
- Production company: Warner Bros. Pictures
- Distributed by: Warner Bros. Pictures
- Release date: February 15, 1941
- Running time: 71 minutes
- Country: United States
- Language: English

The Great Mr. Nobody is a 1941 American comedy drama film directed by Benjamin Stoloff and written by Ben Markson and Kenneth Gamet. The film stars Eddie Albert, Joan Leslie, Alan Hale, Sr., William Lundigan, John Litel, Charles Trowbridge and Paul Hurst. The film was released by Warner Bros. Pictures on February 15, 1941.

== Synopsis ==
Robert, a young employee in the Classified advertising of a newspaper, is a daydreamer who wants to quit his job and sail round the world in search of experience and adventure. However, obstacles keep falling in his path.

== Cast ==
- Eddie Albert as Robert 'Dreamy' Smith
- Joan Leslie as Mary Clover
- Alan Hale, Sr. as 'Skipper' Martin
- William Lundigan as Richard Amesworth
- John Litel as John Wade
- Charles Trowbridge as Grover Dillon
- Paul Hurst as Michael O'Connor
- Dickie Moore as 'Limpy' Barnes
- John Ridgely as Eddie Williams
- Douglas Kennedy as Mr. McGraw
- George Campeau as Mr. Hanes
- William "Billy" Benedict as Jig
- Helen MacKellar as Mrs. Barnes
- Joyce Tucker as Janet Barnes
- Mary Field as Miss Frame
