= Spoilers of the North =

1947 film by Richard Sale

- Directed by: Richard Sale
- Written by: Milton Raison
- Produced by: Donald H. Brown
- Starring: Paul Kelly; Lorna Gray; Evelyn Ankers
- Cinematography: Alfred S. Keller
- Edited by: William P. Thompson
- Music by: Mort Glickman
- Production company: Republic Pictures
- Distributed by: Republic Pictures
- Release date: 24 April 1947
- Running time: 66 minutes
- Country: United States
- Language: English

Spoilers of the North is a 1947 American drama film directed by Richard Sale and starring Paul Kelly, Lorna Gray (billed as "Adrian Booth"), and Evelyn Ankers.

== Cast ==
- Paul Kelly as Matt Garraway
- Lorna Gray as Jane Koster (Billed as "Adrian Booth")
- Evelyn Ankers as Laura Reed
- James Millican as Bill Garraway
- Roy Barcroft as Moose McGovern
- Louis Jean Heydt as Inspector Carl Winters
- Ted Hecht as Joe Taku
- Harlan Briggs as Salty
- Francis McDonald as Pete Koster
- Maurice Cass as Doctor
- Neyle Morrow as Johnny
