= The Timber Trail =

1948 film by Philip Ford

- Theatrical release poster
- Directed by: Philip Ford
- Screenplay by: Robert Creighton Williams
- Produced by: Melville Tucker
- Starring: Monte Hale; Lynne Roberts; James Burke; Roy Barcroft; Francis Ford; Robert Emmett Keane
- Cinematography: Reggie Lanning
- Edited by: Tony Martinelli
- Music by: Mort Glickman
- Production company: Republic Pictures
- Distributed by: Republic Pictures
- Release date: June 15, 1948
- Running time: 67 minutes
- Country: United States
- Language: English

The Timber Trail is a 1948 American Western film directed by Philip Ford, written by Robert Creighton Williams, and starring Monte Hale, Lynne Roberts, James Burke, Roy Barcroft, Francis Ford, and Robert Emmett Keane. It was released on June 15, 1948, by Republic Pictures.

== Plot ==
Bart plans to frame Jed for a double-murder and then kill him.

== Cast ==
- Monte Hale as Monte Hale
- Lynne Roberts as Alice Baker
- James Burke as Jed Baker
- Roy Barcroft as Big Bart
- Francis Ford as Ralph Baker
- Robert Emmett Keane as Jordon Weatherbee
- Steve Darrell as Sheriff
- Fred Graham as Henchman Frank
- Wade Crosby as Henchman Walt
- Eddie Acuff as Telegraph Operator
- Foy Willing as Guitar Player Foy
- Riders of the Purple Sage as Stageline Workers
