= Son of God's Country =

1948 film by R. G. Springsteen

- Theatrical release poster
- Directed by: R. G. Springsteen
- Screenplay by: Paul Gangelin; Robert Creighton Williams
- Produced by: Melville Tucker
- Starring: Monte Hale; Pamela Blake; Paul Hurst; James Nolan; Jay Kirby; Steve Darrell
- Cinematography: John MacBurnie
- Edited by: Harry Keller
- Music by: R. Dale Butts
- Production company: Republic Pictures
- Distributed by: Republic Pictures
- Release date: September 15, 1948
- Running time: 60 minutes
- Country: United States
- Language: English

Son of God's Country is a 1948 American Western film directed by R. G. Springsteen and written by Paul Gangelin and Robert Creighton Williams. The film stars Monte Hale, Pamela Blake, Paul Hurst, James Nolan, Jay Kirby and Steve Darrell. The film was released on September 15, 1948, by Republic Pictures.

== Cast ==
- Monte Hale as U.S. Marshal Monte Hale
- Pamela Blake as Cathy Thornton
- Paul Hurst as Eli Walker
- James Nolan as Bill Sanger
- Jay Kirby as Frank Thornton
- Steve Darrell as Henchman Bigelow
- Francis McDonald as Tom Ford
- Jason Robards, Sr. as John Thornton
- Fred Graham as Henchman Hagen
