= The Missourians =

1950 film by George Blair

- Theatrical release poster
- Directed by: George Blair
- Screenplay by: Arthur E. Orloff
- Produced by: Melville Tucker
- Starring: Monte Hale; Paul Hurst; Roy Barcroft; Lyn Thomas; Howard Negley; Scott Elliott
- Cinematography: John MacBurnie
- Edited by: Robert M. Leeds
- Music by: Stanley Wilson
- Production company: Republic Pictures
- Distributed by: Republic Pictures
- Release date: November 25, 1950
- Running time: 60 minutes
- Country: United States
- Language: English

The Missourians is a 1950 American Western film directed by George Blair and written by Arthur E. Orloff. The film stars Monte Hale, Paul Hurst, Roy Barcroft, Lyn Thomas, Howard Negley and Scott Elliott. The film was released on November 25, 1950 by Republic Pictures.

== Plot ==
In Dorado, Texas, Steve Kovacs, the younger brother of Nick Kovacs, who rides with a band of outlaws called the Missourians, is constantly suspected of lawbreaking. Steve is convinced that the town's animosity is also because of his background as an immigrant.

Steve's brother and his gang are attracted to Dorado by a large amount of money that the town has saved for a church.

== Cast ==
- Monte Hale as Marshal Bill Blades
- Paul Hurst as John X. Finn
- Roy Barcroft as Nick Kovacs
- Lyn Thomas as Peg Finn
- Howard Negley as Lucius Valentine
- Scott Elliott as Steve Kovacs
- Lane Bradford as Lead henchman
- John Hamilton as Mayor Grant McDowall
- Sarah Padden as Mother Kovacs
- Charles Williams as Postmaster Walt
- Perry Ivins as Judge
