= The Old Frontier =

1950 film by Philip Ford

- Directed by: Philip Ford
- Screenplay by: Robert Creighton Williams
- Produced by: Melville Tucker
- Starring: Monte Hale; Paul Hurst; Claudia Barrett; William "Bill" Henry; Tristram Coffin; William Haade
- Cinematography: Ellis W. Carter
- Edited by: Harold Minter
- Music by: Stanley Wilson
- Production company: Republic Pictures
- Distributed by: Republic Pictures
- Release date: July 20, 1950
- Running time: 60 minutes
- Country: United States
- Language: English

The Old Frontier is a 1950 American Western film directed by Philip Ford and written by Robert Creighton Williams. The film stars Monte Hale, Paul Hurst, Claudia Barrett, William "Bill" Henry, Tristram Coffin and William Haade. It was released on July 20, 1950 by Republic Pictures.

== Cast ==
- Monte Hale as Barney Regan
- Paul Hurst as Skipper Horton
- Claudia Barrett as Betty Ames
- William "Bill" Henry as Doctor Tom Creighton
- Tristram Coffin as John Wagner
- William Haade as Henchman Pills
- Victor Kilian as Judge Ames
- Lane Bradford as Henchman Spud
- Denver Pyle as Henchman George
- Almira Sessions as Mrs. Smedley
- Tom London as Banker
