= Man from Rainbow Valley =

1946 film

- Theatrical release poster
- Directed by: R. G. Springsteen
- Screenplay by: Betty Burbridge
- Produced by: Louis Gray
- Starring: Monte Hale; Lorna Gray; Jo Ann Marlowe; Ferris Taylor; Emmett Lynn; Tom London
- Cinematography: Bud Thackery
- Edited by: Edward Mann
- Music by: Mort Glickman
- Production company: Republic Pictures
- Distributed by: Republic Pictures
- Release date: June 15, 1946
- Running time: 56 minutes
- Country: United States
- Language: English

Man from Rainbow Valley is a 1946 American Western Magnacolor film directed by R. G. Springsteen and written by Betty Burbridge. The film stars Monte Hale, Lorna Gray, Jo Ann Marlowe, Ferris Taylor, Emmett Lynn and Tom London. The film was released on June 15, 1946, by Republic Pictures.

== Cast ==
- Monte Hale as Monte Hale
- Lorna Gray as Kay North
- Jo Ann Marlowe as Ginny Hale
- Ferris Taylor as Colonel Winthrop
- Emmett Lynn as Locoweed
- Tom London as Healey
- Bud Geary as Tracy
- Kenne Duncan as Lafe
- Doye O'Dell as Ranch Hand Jim
- Bert Roach as Mayor
- Enright Busse as Musician
- John Scott as Musician
- Frank Wilder as Musician
