= Prince of the Plains =

1949 film by Philip Ford

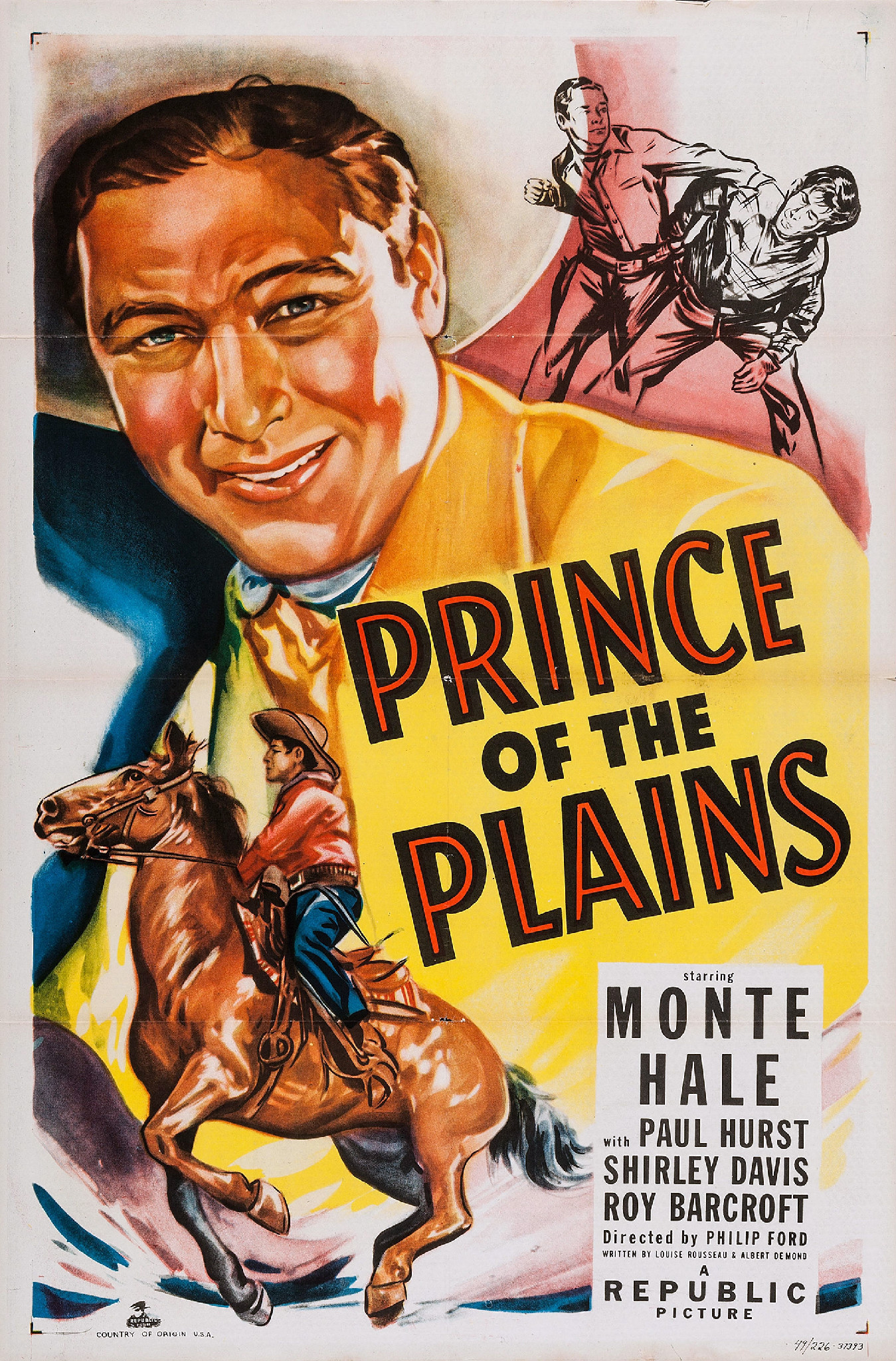
- Theatrical release poster
- Directed by: Philip Ford
- Screenplay by: Louise Rousseau; Albert DeMond
- Produced by: Melville Tucker
- Starring: Monte Hale; Paul Hurst; Shirley Davis; Roy Barcroft; Rory Mallinson; Harry Lauter
- Cinematography: Bud Thackery
- Edited by: Richard L. Van Enger
- Music by: Stanley Wilson
- Production company: Republic Pictures
- Distributed by: Republic Pictures
- Release date: April 8, 1949
- Running time: 59 minutes
- Country: United States
- Language: English

Prince of the Plains is a 1949 American Western film directed by Philip Ford and written by Louise Rousseau and Albert DeMond. The film stars Monte Hale, Paul Hurst, Shirley Davis, Roy Barcroft, Rory Mallinson and Harry Lauter. The film was released on April 8, 1949, by Republic Pictures.

== Cast ==
- Monte Hale as Bat Masterson
- Paul Hurst as Sheriff Hank Hartley
- Shirley Davis as Julie Phillips
- Roy Barcroft as Henchman Regan
- Rory Mallinson as James Taylor
- Harry Lauter as Tom Owens
- Lane Bradford as Henchman Keller
- George M. Carleton as Sam Phillips
