= San Antone Ambush =

1949 film by Philip Ford

- Theatrical release poster
- Directed by: Philip Ford
- Screenplay by: Norman S. Hall
- Produced by: Melville Tucker
- Starring: Monte Hale; Bette Daniels; Paul Hurst; Roy Barcroft; James Cardwell; Trevor Bardette
- Cinematography: John MacBurnie
- Edited by: Tony Martinelli
- Music by: Stanley Wilson
- Production company: Republic Pictures
- Distributed by: Republic Pictures
- Release date: October 7, 1949
- Running time: 60 minutes
- Country: United States
- Language: English

San Antone Ambush is a 1949 American Western film directed by Philip Ford and written by Norman S. Hall. The film stars Monte Hale, Bette Daniels, Paul Hurst, Roy Barcroft, James Cardwell, and Trevor Bardette. The film was released on October 7, 1949, by Republic Pictures.

== Cast ==
- Monte Hale as Lieutenant Ross Kincaid
- Bette Daniels as Sally Wheeler
- Paul Hurst as Happy Daniels
- Roy Barcroft as Henchman Roberts
- James Cardwell as Clint Wheeler
- Trevor Bardette as Wade Shattuck
- Lane Bradford as Al Thomas
- Francis Ford as Major Farnsworth
- Tommy Coats as Wheeler cohort
- Tom London as Bartender Tim
- Edmund Cobb as Marshal Kennedy
