= Hideout (film) =

1949 film by Philip Ford

- Theatrical release poster
- Directed by: Philip Ford
- Screenplay by: John K. Butler
- Produced by: Sidney Picker
- Starring: Lloyd Bridges; Lorna Gray; Ray Collins; Sheila Ryan; Chick Chandler; Jeff Corey
- Cinematography: John MacBurnie
- Edited by: Richard L. Van Enger
- Production company: Republic Pictures
- Distributed by: Republic Pictures
- Release date: March 8, 1949
- Running time: 61 minutes
- Country: United States
- Language: English

Hideout is a 1949 American thriller film directed by Philip Ford and written by John K. Butler. The film stars Lloyd Bridges, Lorna Gray, Ray Collins, Sheila Ryan, Chick Chandler and Jeff Corey. The film was released on March 8, 1949, by Republic Pictures.

== Plot ==
A couple of thieves, Beecham and Evans, rob a Chicago socialite's diamond necklace. They give it to the man they're working for, Arthur Burdette, who promptly double-crosses them. A diamond expert who examines the necklace is then found dead.

Burdette slips away to a small Iowa town under an assumed name. When he hears city attorney George Browning has fired secretary Hannah Kelly, he offers Hannah a job. Browning has no idea that Burdette and Hannah are actually accomplices in crime, and pays no heed when new secretary Edie Hanson suggests that possibility.

Betrayed crooks Beecham and Evans show up, looking for Burdette and the necklace. Browning doesn't realize how involved Hannah is until she shoots the two thieves and ends up having the stolen necklace on her. Edie helps him get the better of Hannah and Burdette, also making Browning realize he's falling for the new girl.

== Cast ==
- Lloyd Bridges as George Browning, aka Fogerty
- Lorna Gray as Hannah Kelly, aka Betty
- Ray Collins as Arthur Burdette
- Sheila Ryan as Edie Hanson
- Chick Chandler as Joe Bottomley
- Jeff Corey as Beecham
- Alan Carney as Evans
- Emory Parnell as Arnie Anderson
- Don Beddoe as Dr. Hamilton Gibbs
- Nana Bryant as Sybil Elwood Kaymeer
- Charles Halton as Gabriel Wotter
- Paul E. Burns as Pops
- Douglas Evans as Radio Announcer
