= The Roaring Road (1926 film) =

1926 film

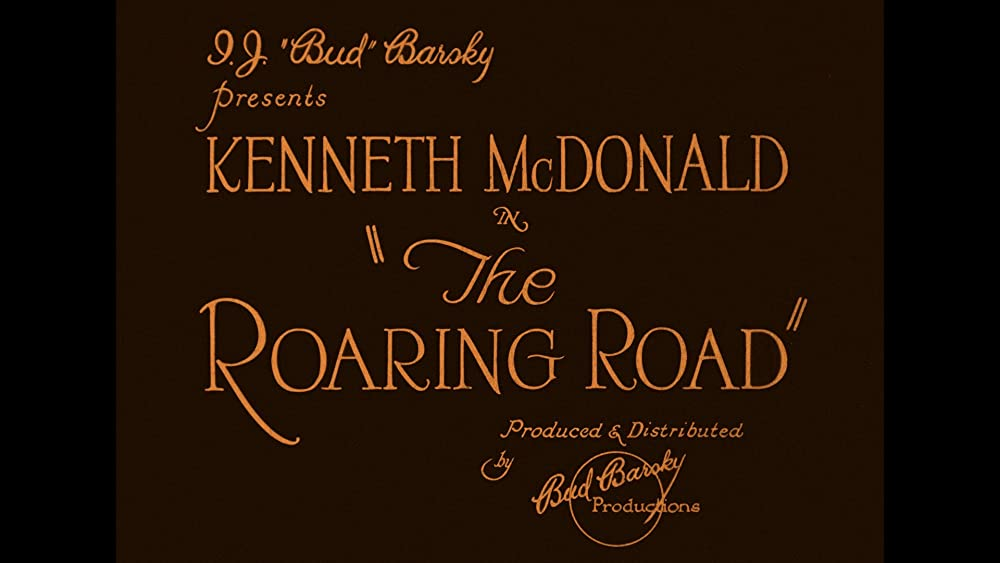
- Directed by: Paul Hurst
- Produced by: Bud Barsky
- Starring: Kenneth MacDonald; Jane Thomas; William H. Strauss
- Cinematography: Jack Cotner
- Production company: Bud Barsky Corporation
- Distributed by: Bud Barsky Corporation
- Release date: May 1, 1926
- Running time: 50 minutes
- Country: United States
- Languages: Silent; English intertitles

The Roaring Road is a 1926 American silent action film directed by Paul Hurst and starring Kenneth MacDonald, Jane Thomas and William H. Strauss. Location shooting took place around Los Angeles including the Legion Ascot Speedway. A young racing driver pioneers a new car and enters it into a hundred-mile race. A restored version of the film premiered on Turner Classic Movies in 2021, with the print provided by Mark Heller’s Streamline Cinema and funded by The Academy Film Archive.

== Cast ==
- Kenneth MacDonald as Jimmie Miller
- Jane Thomas as Minnie Rosenburg
- William H. Strauss as Sol Rosenburg
- George Bunny as James Miller
- Jeanne Wray as Betty - Rosenburg's Stenographer
- Ben Corbett as Henchman
- Paul Hurst as Checking Board Tabulator

== Bibliography ==
- Connelly, Robert B. The Silents: Silent Feature Films, 1910-36, Volume 40, Issue 2. December Press, 1998.
- Munden, Kenneth White. The American Film Institute Catalog of Motion Pictures Produced in the United States, Part 1. University of California Press, 1997.
