= Lorna Gray =

American actress (1917–2017)

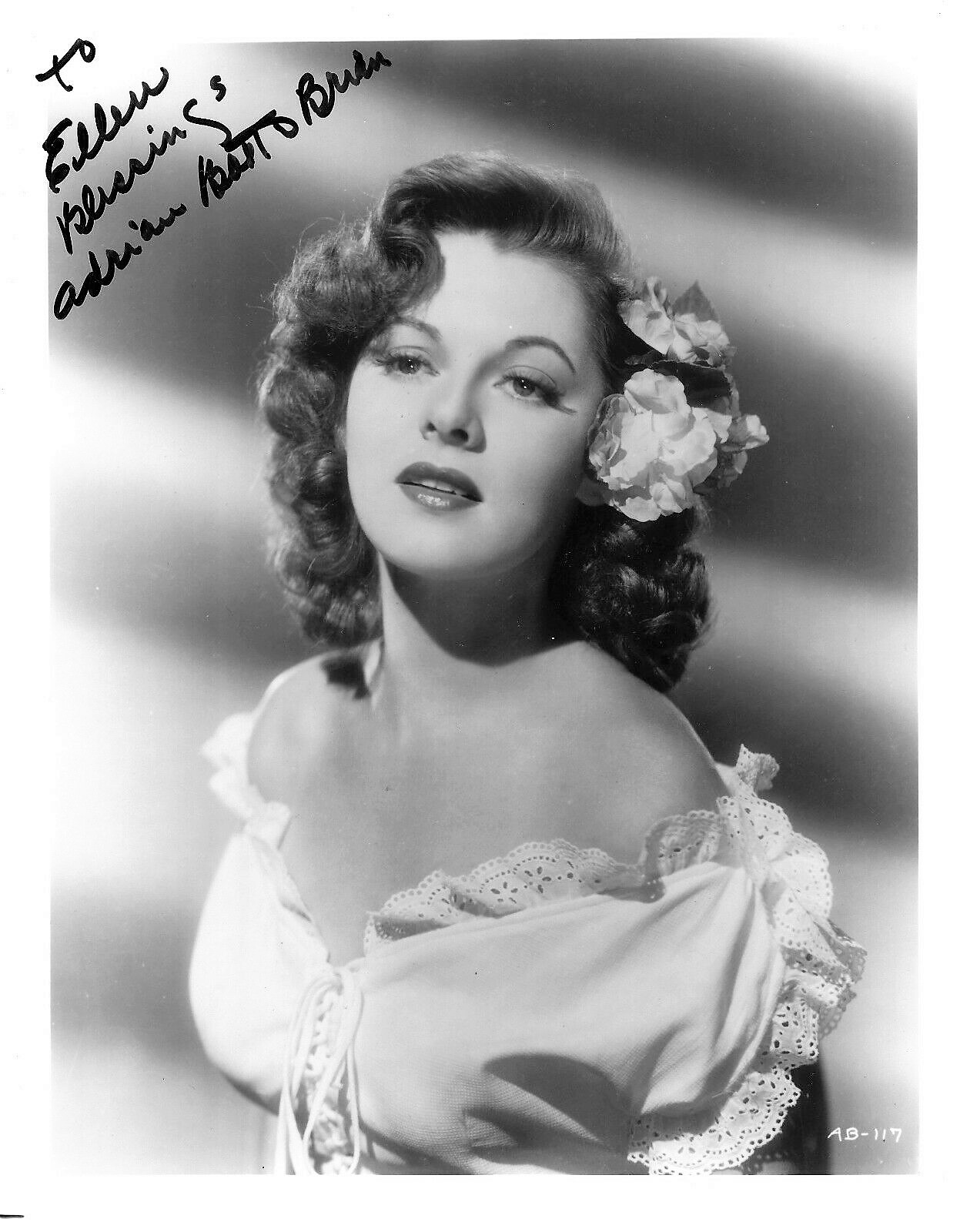
- Autographed photo as Adrian Booth Brian
- Born: Virginia Pound; July 26, 1917; Grand Rapids, Michigan, U.S.
- Died: April 30, 2017 (aged 99); Sherman Oaks, California, U.S.
- Other names: Adrian Booth; Adrian Brian; Adrian Booth Brian
- Occupation: Actress
- Years active: 1937–1951
- Spouse: David Brian (m. 1949)

Signature
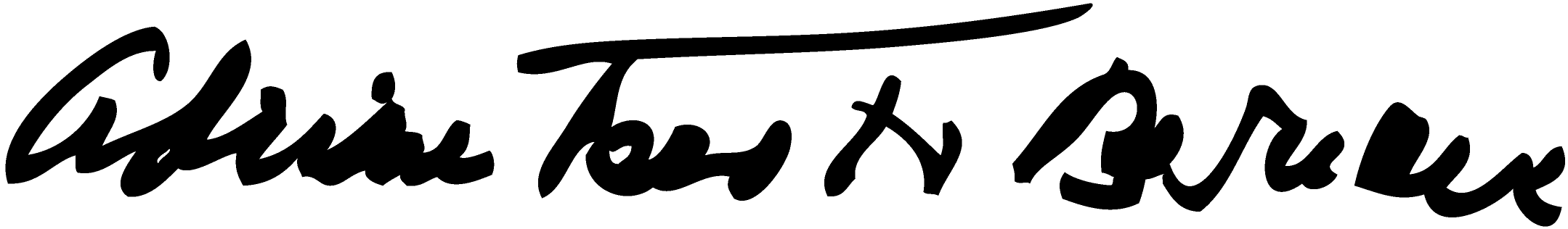

Virginia Pound (July 26, 1917 – April 30, 2017), known professionally as Lorna Gray and (after 1945) Adrian Booth, was an American film actress known for her comic roles, and later as a villainess. She is best known for her roles in Columbia Pictures comedy shorts and Republic Pictures serials.

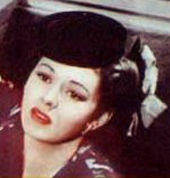
Gray in Federal Operator 99, 1945

== Early years ==
Gray was born in Grand Rapids, Michigan. After her father's millinery business was a victim of the Great Depression, the family split up. Before appearing in films, Gray sang with a group in Cleveland called Ben Yost's Varsity Co-eds that performed primarily in theaters as an introductory act before the main feature.

== Career ==
Although Gray took a film test at Universal Studios and signed a brief contract with Paramount Pictures, her first major film break occurred at Columbia Pictures. As a Columbia contract player, she appeared in the studio's shorts and serials, including Flying G-Men, Pest from the West and the Three Stooges film You Nazty Spy!. When her Columbia contract lapsed, she found work at Monogram Pictures, where she worked with action star Frankie Darro.

Gray starred opposite John Wayne in Red River Range (1938) and appeared in the title role in O, My Darling Clementine (1943), a country-music film starring Roy Acuff as a singing sheriff.

In her Paramount films, such as Hold 'Em Navy, she was credited as Virginia Pound, but she was given the name Lorna Gray by Columbia and she used it from 1938 until 1945, when she left Columbia and moved to Republic Pictures. She appeared as Lorna Gray in Republic's Federal Operator 99 but subsequently adopted the name Adrian Booth.

At Republic, she often received costar billing in Westerns, the only woman other than Dale Evans to be billed so highly at the studio. She also starred in Republic's serial about the comic-book superhero Captain America.

== Personal life ==
In 1945, shortly after signing a contract with Republic Pictures, Gray and the stunt performer Ruel F. Taylor were arrested for suspicion of possessing marijuana in Los Angeles. A $1,000 bail set her free, and she was later exonerated after Taylor testified at his preliminary hearing that Gray had not used the marijuana and was not aware of it.

Gray married actor David Brian on July 19, 1949 and retired from motion pictures in 1951. As Adrian Booth, she was awarded the Golden Boot Award in 1998 and attended film festivals into her 90s. She appeared as a guest at the annual Three Stooges convention held in Fort Washington, Pennsylvania on April 30, 2011.

== Death ==
Gray died in Sherman Oaks, California on April 30, 2017 at the age of 99.

== Filmography ==
Year	Title	Role	Notes
1937	Hold 'Em Navy	Girl	
1937	Thrill of a Lifetime	Chorus girl	Uncredited
1938	The Buccaneer		Uncredited
1938	The Big Broadcast of 1938	Divorcee	
1938	Scandal Street		Uncredited
1938	Adventure in Sahara	Carla Preston	
1938	Red River Range	Jane Mason	
1938	Smashing the Spy Ring	Anna Loring	
1939	The Lone Wolf Spy Hunt	Girl Michael runs into in nightclub	Uncredited
1939	Flying G-Men	Babs McKay	
1939	Outside These Walls	Secretary	Uncredited
1939	Missing Daughters	Nan	Uncredited
1939	Good Girls Go to Paris	Bridesmaid	Uncredited
1939	Coast Guard		Uncredited
1939	The Man They Could Not Hang	Janet Savaard	
1939	Those High Grey Walls	Nurse	Uncredited
1939	Oily to Bed, Oily to Rise	May Jenkins	Short, Uncredited
1939	Mr. Smith Goes to Washington	Woman at station	Uncredited
1939	Beware Spooks!		Uncredited
1939	The Amazing Mr. Williams	Nurse	Uncredited
1939	Three Sappy People	Sherry Rumsford	Short
1939	The Stranger from Texas	Jean Browning	
1939	Pest from the West	Conchita	Short
1940	Cafe Hostess	Cafe hostess	Uncredited
1940	You Nazty Spy!	Mattie Herring	Short, Uncredited
1940	Convicted Woman	Frankie Mason	
1940	Bullets for Rustlers	Ann Houston	
1940	Rockin' thru the Rockies	Flossie	Short
1940	Deadwood Dick	Anne Butler	Serial
1940	Up in the Air	Rita Wilson	
1940	Drums of the Desert	Helene Laroche	
1941	Father Steps Out	Helen Matthews	
1941	Tuxedo Junction	Joan Gordon	
1942	Perils of Nyoka	Vultura	
1942	Ridin' Down the Canyon	Barbara Joyce	
1943	So Proudly We Hail!	Lt. Tony Dacelli	
1943	O, My Darling Clementine	Clementine Cheshire	
1944	Captain America	Gail Richards	Serial
1944	The Girl Who Dared	Ann Carroll	
1945	Adventures of Kitty O'Day	Gloria Williams	
1945	Fashion Model	Yvonne Brewster	
1945	Federal Operator 99	Rita Parker	
1945	Tell It to a Star	Mona St. Clair	
1945	Dakota	Entertainer	Uncredited
1946	Home on the Range	Bonnie Garth	
1946	Valley of the Zombies	Susan Drake	
1946	Man from Rainbow Valley	Kay North	
1946	Daughter of Don Q	Dolores Quantero	
1946	Out California Way	Gloria McCoy	
1947	Last Frontier Uprising	Mary Lou Garnder	
1947	Spoilers of the North	Jane Koster	
1947	Along the Oregon Trail	Sally Dunn	
1947	Exposed	Judith Bentry	
1947	Under Colorado Skies	Julia Collins	
1948	Lightnin' in the Forest	Dell Parker	
1948	California Firebrand	Joyce Mason	
1948	The Gallant Legion	Connie Faulkner	
1948	The Plunderers	Julie Ann McCabe	
1949	The Last Bandit	Kate Foley	
1949	Hideout	Betty / Hannah Kelly	
1949	Brimstone	Molly Bannister	
1950	Rock Island Trail	Aleeta	
1950	The Savage Horde	Livvy Weston	
1951	Oh! Susanna	Lia Wilson	
1951	Yellow Fin	Jean Elliott	
1951	The Sea Hornet	Ginger Sullivan	

== Awards ==
Year	Award	Result	Ref.
1998	Golden Boot Awards	Won	
