= Last Frontier Uprising =

1947 film

- Theatrical release poster
- Directed by: Lesley Selander
- Starring: Monte Hale; Adrian Booth
- Edited by: Charles Craft
- Production company: Republic Pictures
- Distributed by: Republic Pictures
- Release date: February 1, 1947 (United States)
- Running time: 67 minutes
- Country: United States
- Language: English

Last Frontier Uprising is a 1947 American Western film directed by Lesley Selander for Republic Pictures and starring Monte Hale and Adrian Booth.

== Plot ==
American government horse purchaser Monte Hale (Monte Hale) meets his match in both love and profession, private buyer Vance Daley (Malcolm "Bud" McTaggart), who works under unprofessed criminal "Liberal" Lyons (Philip Van Zandt). Hale and Daley attend a horse auction, and fight for Texan rancher Mary Lou Gardner's team of prized colts. When a victor cannot be determined, the gauntlet is thrown – the two men must compete one-on-one in a horse race; the victor will win the colts.

Hale emerges as winner of the race. However, Boyd Blackwell (Roy Barcroft), a minion of Lyons, tampers with Daley's losing horse to make it seem that Hale cheated. Faced with concrete evidence, Gardner gives Daley the horses, while Hale becomes speechless. Daley is also stumped as to how the incident came to be. He questions Blackwell, only to be killed by Lyons. Hale happens to be nearby and Blackwell seizes the opportunity to frame him for Daley's murder.

After being charged and arrested by the sheriff, a desperate Hales send his messenger dog Skipper to ask Gardner to find help. Meanwhile, Lyons and his gang are looting Mary Lou Gardner's residence. The police arrive in time and everybody gets handcuffed.

== Cast ==
- Monte Hale as Monte Hale
- Malcolm McTaggart as Vance Daley
- Lorna Gray (Adrian Booth) as Mary Lou Gardner
- Roy Barcroft as Boyd Blackwell
- The Riders of the Purple Sage

== Production and release ==
The film was produced and distributed by Republic Pictures Corporation. It was directed by Lesley Selander. Although American western star Bob Steele did not participate in the film, he was erroneously credited as one of the main cast for Last Frontier Uprising in one newspaper advertisement. In his book Western Movies: A Guide to 5,105 Feature Films, Michael R. Pitts wrote that the film was "predictable", though he still found it "enjoyable [for a] Monte Hale vehicle".

== See also ==
- List of Western films of the 1940s
