= Douglas Kennedy (actor) =

American actor (1915–1973)

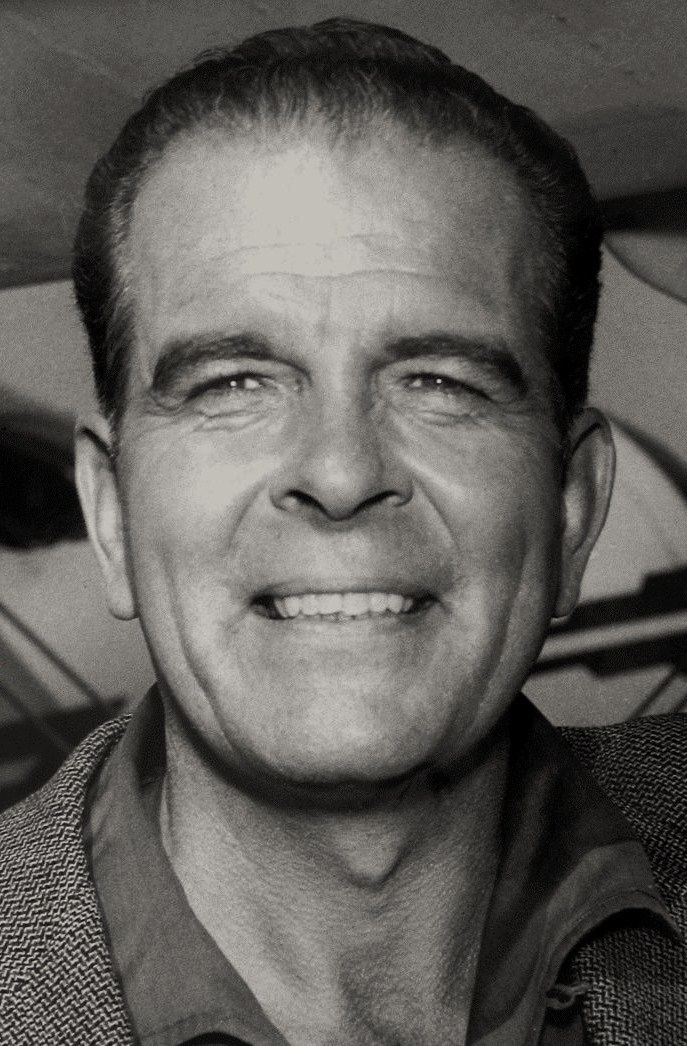
- Kennedy in Gunsmoke (1960)
- Born: Douglas Richards Kennedy; September 14, 1915; New York City, U.S.
- Died: August 10, 1973 (aged 57); Honolulu, Hawaii, U.S.
- Resting place: National Memorial Cemetery of the Pacific, Honolulu
- Other names: Doug Kennedy; Keith Douglas
- Education: Amherst College
- Occupation: Actor
- Years active: 1935–1973
- Spouse: Isabell Russell
- Children: 2

Douglas Richards Kennedy (September 14, 1915 – August 10, 1973) was an American actor who appeared in more than 190 films from 1935 to 1973.

== Early years ==
Kennedy was the son of Mr. and Mrs. Dion W. Kennedy. He served in the U. S. Army from 1940 to 1945.

== Career ==
Kennedy was a character player and occasional leading man in Hollywood. Making his debut in 1935, he played a significant number of supporting roles and was able to secure contract-player status, first at Paramount Pictures and later at Warner Brothers.

His acting career was interrupted by World War II service as a major in the Signal Corps with the Office of Strategic Services and Army Intelligence. After the military, he returned to films and played character roles, often western villains or territorial marshals, as well as isolated leads in low-budget pictures.

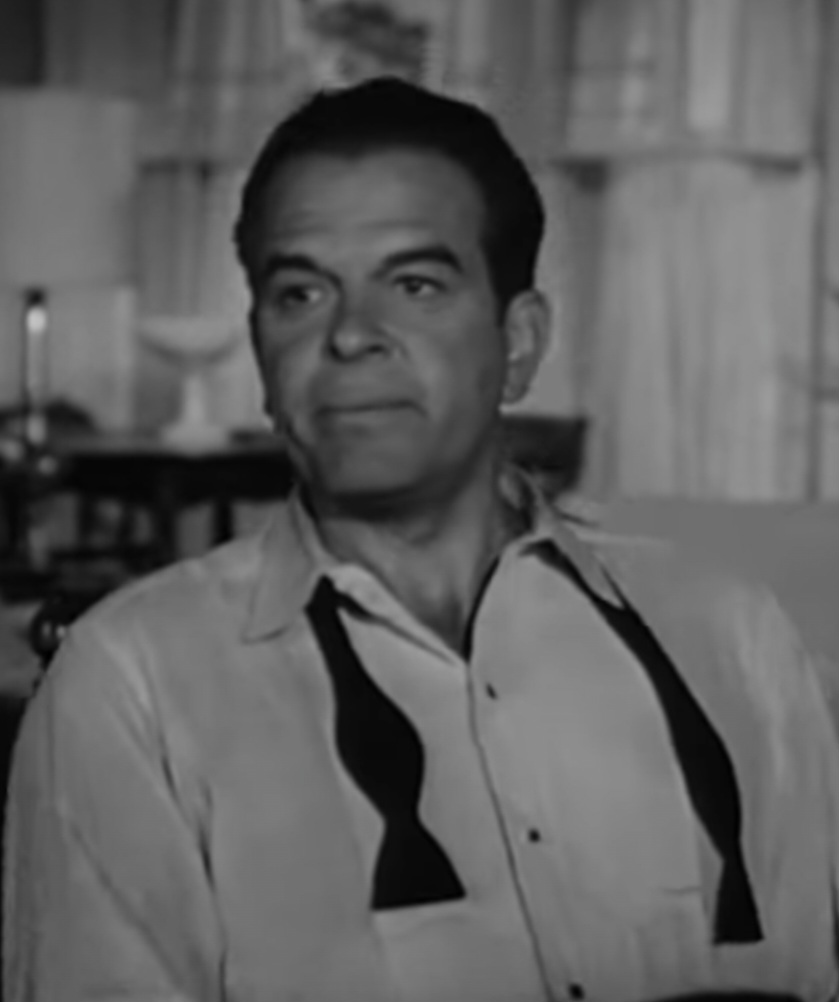
Kennedy in The Amazing Transparent Man (1960)

Kennedy had a starring role in the series Steve Donovan, Western Marshal, with Eddy Waller as his sidekick Rusty Lee. He was also one of the policemen who vanishes in the science fiction classic Invaders from Mars.

He played the gunfighter William P. Longley in a 1954 episode of the series Stories of the Century, starring and narrated by Jim Davis.

In the 1957 (season one) Perry Mason episode 'The Case of the Moth-Eaten Mink' he played the part of Detective Sergeant Jaffrey, eventually revealed as the murderer.

In 1958, he appeared as Steven Boles in the Perry Mason episode "The Case of The Lucky Loser". In 1960, he appeared as the murderer Lucky Sterling in the Perry Mason episode 'The Case of the Wary Wildcatter'. In 1965, he appeared as Brady Duncan in the Perry Mason episode "The Case of the Fatal Fetish".

In 1958, Kennedy appeared in Jim Davis' second series Rescue 8 in the episode "Calamity Coach". In the story, rescuers Wes Cameron (Davis) and Skip Johnson (Lang Jeffries) work to rescue three actors on location when a stagecoach tumbles down a mountain.

Kennedy played the role of Jay Brisco in the 1959 episode "Law West of the Pecos" of the series Colt .45. Frank Ferguson portrayed Judge Roy Bean, and Lisa Gaye was cast as June Webster.

Later, Kennedy portrayed Sheriff Fred Madden of The Big Valley, with Barbara Stanwyck. He made his last appearance in 1973 in three episodes of Hawaii Five-O, with Jack Lord.

== Personal life and death ==
Kennedy was married to Isabell Russell, and they had a son, Douglas Kennedy Jr.

Kennedy died of cancer at age of 57 in Honolulu, Hawaii, where he had been for the shooting of Hawaii Five-O. He is interred at National Memorial Cemetery of the Pacific in Honolulu.

== Selected filmography ==
=== Films ===
- 'G' Men (1935) – Agent – 1949 Reissue Scenes (uncredited)
- Women Without Names (1940) – Secretary (uncredited)
- Opened by Mistake (1940) – State Trooper (uncredited)
- Those Were the Days! (1940) – Allen
- The Way of All Flesh (1940) – Timothy
- The Ghost Breakers (1940) – Intern (uncredited)
- Rhythm on the River (1940) – Party Guest (uncredited)
- Arise, My Love (1940) – College Boy (uncredited)
- North West Mounted Police (1940) – Constable Carter
- Love Thy Neighbor (1940) – Doorman at Rehearsal (uncredited)
- The Mad Doctor (1941) – Hotel Clerk (uncredited)
- The Great Mr. Nobody (1941) – Mr. McGraw
- The Round Up (1941) – Trooper
- Here Comes Happiness (1941) – Announcer (voice, uncredited)
- Strange Alibi (1941) – Reporter (uncredited)
- Affectionately Yours (1941) – Airline Official (uncredited)
- The Nurse's Secret (1941) – Dr. Keene
- The Bride Came C.O.D. (1941) – Second Reporter
- Passage from Hong Kong (1941) – Jeff Hunter
- The Unfaithful (1947) – Roger
- Nora Prentiss (1947) – NYC Emergency Room doctor
- Stallion Road (1947) – Horse Show Announcer (uncredited)
- Possessed (1947) – Assistant District Attorney
- Deep Valley (1947) – Guard (uncredited)
- Life with Father (1947) – Morley – Young Clergyman (uncredited)
- Dark Passage (1947) – Detective Kennedy
- The Unsuspected (1947) – Bill (uncredited)
- That Hagen Girl (1947) – Herb Delaney
- Always Together (1947) – Doberman
- The Voice of the Turtle (1947) – Naval Officer
- April Showers (1948) – Narrator (voice, uncredited)
- To the Victor (1948) – Steve
- Romance on the High Seas (1948) – Car Salesman (uncredited)
- The Big Punch (1948) – Football Broadcaster (voice, uncredited)
- Embraceable You (1948) – Dr. Wirth
- Johnny Belinda (1948) – Mountie (uncredited)
- Adventures of Don Juan (1948) – Don Rodrigo
- The Decision of Christopher Blake (1948) – J. Roger Bascomb (uncredited)
- Whiplash (1948) – Costello
- One Sunday Afternoon (1948) – Jasper (uncredited)
- John Loves Mary (1949) – Colonel McGaw (uncredited)
- Flaxy Martin (1949) – Hap Richie
- South of St. Louis (1949) – Lee Price
- A Kiss in the Dark (1949) – Radio Concert Broadcaster (voice, uncredited)
- Homicide (1949) – Opening Off-Screen Narrator (voice, uncredited)
- Flamingo Road (1949) – Police Radio Broadcaster (voice, uncredited)
- Look for the Silver Lining (1949) – Doctor (uncredited)
- The Fountainhead (1949) – Reporter (uncredited)
- One Last Fling (1949) – Vic Lardner
- South of Rio (1949) – Henchman Bob Mitchell
- It's a Great Feeling (1949) – Opening Off-Screen Narrator (uncredited)
- Task Force (1949) – Ship's Radio (voice, uncredited)
- The House Across the Street (1949) – Opening Narrator (voice, uncredited)
- Fighting Man of the Plains (1949) – Ken Vedder
- Ranger of Cherokee Strip (1949) – Joe Bearclaws
- East Side, West Side (1949) – Alec Dawning
- Montana (1950) – Rodney Ackroyd
- Backfire (1950) – Heard on Radio (voice, uncredited)
- Barricade (1950) – Clay's Man (uncredited)
- Ma and Pa Kettle Go to Town (1950) – George Donahue (uncredited)
- The Next Voice You Hear... (1950) – Mitch (uncredited)
- The Cariboo Trail (1950) – Murphy
- Convicted (1950) – Detective Bailey
- Chain Gang (1950) – Cliff Roberts
- Revenue Agent (1950) – Steve Daniels – IRS agent
- The Du Pont Story (1950) – Coleman du Pont
- Oh! Susanna (1951) – Trooper Emers
- The Lion Hunters (1951) – Marty Martin
- I Was an American Spy (1951) – Sergeant John Phillips
- The Texas Rangers (1951) – Dave Rudabaugh
- China Corsair (1951) – Captain Frenchy
- Callaway Went Thataway (1951) – Drunk
- Indian Uprising (1952) – Cliff Taggert
- For Men Only (1952) – Dean Oliver Harland Mayberry
- Fort Osage (1952) – George Keane
- Hoodlum Empire (1952) – Henchman Brinkley (uncredited)
- Last Train from Bombay (1952) – Kevin / Brian O'Hara
- Ride the Man Down (1952) – Harve Garrison
- Torpedo Alley (1952) – Lieutenant Dora Gates
- San Antone (1953) – Captain Garfield, U.S. Cavalry
- Jack McCall, Desperado (1953) – 'Wild' Bill Hickok
- Invaders from Mars (1953) – Tall Cop Jackson Who Vanishes (uncredited)
- Safari Drums (1953) – Brad Morton
- Gun Belt (1953) – Mel Dixon
- War Paint (1953) – Trooper Clancy
- Mexican Manhunt (1953) – Dan McCracken
- All American (1953) – Tate Hardy
- Sea of Lost Ships (1953) – Helicopter Pilot
- Rails Into Laramie (1954) – Telegraph Operator
- The Lone Gun (1954) – Gad Moran
- Massacre Canyon (1954) – Sergeant James Marlowe
- The High and the Mighty (1954) – Boyd, Public Relations (uncredited)
- The Big Chase (1954) – Police Lieutenant Ned Daggert
- Sitting Bull (1954) – Colonel Custer
- Cry Vengeance (1954) – Tino Morelli
- Wyoming Renegades (1955) – Charlie Veer
- Strange Lady in Town (1955) – Slade Wickstrom
- The Eternal Sea (1955) – Captain Walter Riley
- Wiretapper (1955) – Charles Rumsden
- Strange Intruder (1956) – Parry Sandborn
- The Last Wagon (1956) – Colonel Normand
- Miami Exposé (1956) – Dan McCracken
- Last of the Badmen (1957) – Hawkins
- Hell's Crossroads (1957) – Frank James
- The Land Unknown (1957) – Captain Burnham
- Chicago Confidential (1957) – Ken Harrison
- Rockabilly Baby (1957) – Tom Griffith
- The Bonnie Parker Story (1958) – Tom Steel
- The Lone Ranger and the Lost City of Gold (1958) – Ross Brady
- Good Day for a Hanging (1959) – Voice of Gang Member (uncredited)
- Lone Texan (1959) – Major Phillip Harvey
- The Alligator People (1959) – Dr. Wayne MacGregor
- The Amazing Transparent Man (1960) – Joey Faust
- Flight of the Lost Balloon (1961) – Sir Hubert Warrington
- The Fastest Guitar Alive (1967) – Joe
- The Destructors (1968) – General

=== TV shows ===
- Fireside Theatre (1951–1953) – Stafford / Dan / Joe / Will Paton
- Cavalcade of America (1953)
- Schlitz Playhouse of Stars (1953–1954) – Lieutenant Mark Randall / Colonel Robert Edwards / Tom Babcock
- Hopalong Cassidy (1954) – Stacy Keller
- Letter to Loretta (1954) – Roger Stevens
- Stories of the Century (1954) – Bill Longley
- Climax! (1954) – Uncle Gavin
- The Lone Ranger (1950–1955) Episode 41 "Pardon for Curley"
- Science Fiction Theatre (1955) – Colonel R.J. Barton
- Annie Oakley (1955) – Ralph Putnam / Jim Hayward
- Matinee Theatre (1955–1956)
- Dragnet (1955–1967) – Agent Tom Ashford
- Steve Donovan, Western Marshal (1955–1956) – Marshal Steve Donovan
- Sneak Preview (1956) (Season 1 Episode 5: "The Way Back")
- Alfred Hitchcock Presents (1956–1959)
  - (Season 2 Episode 10: "Jonathan") (1956) - Jonathan Dalliford
  - (Season 2 Episode 38: "A Little Sleep") (1957) - Austin
  - (Season 5 Episode 13: "An Occurrence at Owl Creek Bridge") (1959) - Union Officer
- Tales of Wells Fargo (1957) – Clancy, Martin Yates
- Cheyenne (1957) – Blake Holloway
- Perry Mason (1957–1965)
- Studio One (1958) – Mr. Gordon
- Tombstone Territory (1958) – Sam Colby
- The Rough Riders (1958) – Sergeant True
- Bronco (1958) – Paul Duquesne
- Wanted: Dead or Alive (1958) – Sheriff Hank Bedloe
- Cimarron City (1958) – Sam Thaw
- Northwest Passage (1958) – Eli Dillon
- Jefferson Drum (1958) – Dallas
- Wagon Train (1958–1959) – Colonel Hillary / John Loring
- Maverick (1958–1959) – McFearson / Connors
- Bat Masterson (1959) – Sheriff Jeb Crater
- Alcoa Presents: One Step Beyond (1959) – Sergeant Cooper
- General Electric Theater (1959) – Sam Allen
- The Restless Gun (1959) – Sheriff / Cal Winfield
- The Lineup (1959)
- Colt .45 (1959) – Jay Brisco
- Zorro (1959) – Manuel Larrios
- Wyatt Earp (1959) – Dave Mather
- Pony Express (1960) – General Tate / Marshal Jeb Loring
- Laramie (1960) – Gunrunner
- The Texan (1959–1960) – Sheriff / Jason Quarles
- Rawhide (1959–1965) – Nat Benson / Maxey / Ewan Dangerfield
- Bonanza (1959–1968) – Sheriff Sam Purcell / Jonathan Frazier / Big Charlie Monahan / Stoney S7 E13 "A Natural Wizard"/ Bill Stewart
- Have Gun - Will Travel (1960) – Wynn Loring
- Lock-Up (1960) – Gavin Bledsoe
- Riverboat (1960) – McLeish
- The Rifleman (1960) – Pete Crandell
- Pony Express (1960) – General Tate / Marshal Jeb Loring
- Sugarfoot (1960) – Sheriff Williams
- Gunsmoke (1960–1966) – John Stoner / Talbot / Yancey Cliver / Traych
- Ripcord (1961)
- The Everglades (1961–1962) – Mike Flint / Dan Martin
- The Outer Limits (1965) – General Daniel Pettit
- The Legend of Jesse James (1965) – Ben Todd
- The Big Valley (1965–1969) – Sheriff Fred Madden / Marshal / Alexander Morrison / McColl
- Lassie (1964–1966) – Dale Jensen / Father
- The Virginian (1966–1967) – Mr. Oliver / Sheriff
- Cade's County (1971) – Captain Steve Hoover
- O'Hara, U.S. Treasury (1972) – Policeman
- Hawaii Five-O (1973) – Turner Carr / Sinclair / Fleming
