= Ranger of Cherokee Strip =

1949 film by Philip Ford

- Theatrical release poster
- Directed by: Philip Ford
- Screenplay by: Robert Creighton Williams
- Story by: Earle Snell
- Produced by: Melville Tucker
- Starring: Monte Hale; Paul Hurst; Alix Talton; Roy Barcroft; Douglas Kennedy; George Meeker
- Cinematography: Ellis W. Carter
- Edited by: Irving M. Schoenberg
- Music by: Stanley Wilson
- Production company: Republic Pictures
- Distributed by: Republic Pictures
- Release date: November 4, 1949
- Running time: 60 minutes
- Country: United States
- Language: English

Ranger of Cherokee Strip is a 1949 American Western film directed by Philip Ford and written by Robert Creighton Williams. The film stars Monte Hale, Paul Hurst, Alix Talton, Roy Barcroft, Douglas Kennedy and George Meeker. The film was released on November 4, 1949, by Republic Pictures.

== Cast ==
- Monte Hale as Steve Howard
- Paul Hurst as Sheriff Jug Mason
- Alix Talton as Mary Bluebird
- Roy Barcroft as Mark Sanders
- Douglas Kennedy as Joe Bearclaws
- George Meeker as Eric Parsons
- Frank Fenton as McKinnon
- Monte Blue as Chief Hunter
- Neyle Morrow as Tokata
- Arthur Walsh as Will Rogers
