= South of Rio =

1949 film by Philip Ford

- Directed by: Philip Ford
- Screenplay by: Norman S. Hall
- Produced by: Melville Tucker
- Starring: Monte Hale; Kay Christopher; Paul Hurst; Roy Barcroft; Douglas Kennedy; Don Haggerty
- Cinematography: John MacBurnie
- Edited by: Harold Minter
- Music by: Stanley Wilson
- Production company: Republic Pictures
- Distributed by: Republic Pictures
- Release date: July 27, 1949
- Running time: 60 minutes
- Country: United States
- Language: English

South of Rio is a 1949 American Western film directed by Philip Ford, written by Norman S. Hall, and starring Monte Hale, Kay Christopher, Paul Hurst, Roy Barcroft, Douglas Kennedy and Don Haggerty. It was released on July 27, 1949, by Republic Pictures.

== Cast ==
- Monte Hale as Jeff Lanning
- Kay Christopher as Carol Waterman
- Paul Hurst as Andy Weems
- Roy Barcroft as Lon Bryson
- Douglas Kennedy as Henchman Bob Mitchell
- Don Haggerty as Chuck Bowers
- Rory Mallinson as Captain Dan Brennan
- Lane Bradford as Henchman Tex
- Emmett Vogan as Henry Waterman
- Myron Healey as Marshal Travis
- Tom London as Jim Weston
