= Outcasts of the Trail =

1949 film by Philip Ford

- Theatrical release poster
- Directed by: Philip Ford
- Screenplay by: Olive Cooper
- Produced by: Melville Tucker
- Starring: Monte Hale; Paul Hurst; Jeff Donnell; Roy Barcroft; John Gallaudet; Milton Parsons
- Cinematography: Bud Thackery
- Edited by: Tony Martinelli
- Music by: Stanley Wilson
- Production company: Republic Pictures
- Distributed by: Republic Pictures
- Release date: June 8, 1949
- Running time: 59 minutes
- Country: United States
- Language: English

Outcasts of the Trail is a 1949 American Western film directed by Philip Ford and written by Olive Cooper. The film stars Monte Hale, Paul Hurst, Jeff Donnell, Roy Barcroft, John Gallaudet and Milton Parsons. The film was released on June 8, 1949, by Republic Pictures.

== Cast ==
- Monte Hale as Pat Garrett
- Paul Hurst as Doc Meadowlark
- Jeff Donnell as Vinnie White
- Roy Barcroft as Jim Judd
- John Gallaudet as Ivory White
- Milton Parsons as Elias Dunkenscold
- Tommy Ivo as Chad White
- Minerva Urecal as Abbie Rysen
- Ted Mapes as Fred Smith
- George Lloyd as Horace Rysen
- Steve Darrell as Sheriff Wilson
