= Law of the Golden West =

1949 film by Philip Ford

- Theatrical release poster
- Directed by: Philip Ford
- Screenplay by: Norman S. Hall
- Produced by: Melville Tucker
- Starring: Monte Hale; Paul Hurst; Gail Davis; Roy Barcroft; John Holland; Scott Elliott
- Cinematography: Ernest Miller
- Edited by: Richard L. Van Enger
- Music by: Stanley Wilson
- Production company: Republic Pictures
- Distributed by: Republic Pictures
- Release date: May 23, 1949
- Running time: 60 minutes
- Country: United States
- Language: English

Law of the Golden West is a 1949 American Western film directed by Philip Ford and written by Norman S. Hall. The film stars Monte Hale, Paul Hurst, Gail Davis, Roy Barcroft, John Holland and Scott Elliott. The film was released on May 23, 1949, by Republic Pictures.

== Cast ==
- Monte Hale as Bill Cody
- Paul Hurst as Otis Ellis
- Gail Davis as Ann Calvert
- Roy Barcroft as Clete Larrabee
- John Holland as Quentin Morell
- Scott Elliott as Wayne Calvert
- Lane Bradford as Henchman Belden
- Harold Goodwin as Northerner in bar
- John Hamilton as Isaac Cody
