= Pioneer Marshal =

1949 film directed by Philip Ford

- Theatrical release poster
- Directed by: Philip Ford
- Screenplay by: Robert Creighton Williams
- Produced by: Melville Tucker
- Starring: Monte Hale; Paul Hurst; Nan Leslie; Roy Barcroft; Damian O'Flynn; Myron Healey
- Cinematography: John MacBurnie
- Edited by: Robert M. Leeds
- Music by: Stanley Wilson
- Production company: Republic Pictures
- Distributed by: Republic Pictures
- Release date: November 24, 1949
- Running time: 60 minutes
- Country: United States
- Language: English

Pioneer Marshal is a 1949 American Western film directed by Philip Ford and written by Robert Creighton Williams. The film stars Monte Hale, Paul Hurst, Nan Leslie, Roy Barcroft, Damian O'Flynn and Myron Healey. The film was released as a Fawcett Movie Comic#1 on November 24, 1949, by Republic Pictures.

== Plot ==
Bruce Burnett, formerly of Chicago runs a remote area that is a haven for outlaws where lawmen are shot on sight. One day, two men arrive by stage, one is detected as a lawman seeking to arrest a killer in Burnett's outlaw territory. Burnett detects the identity of Harvey Masters, a Kansas City lawman and sportingly allows him to leave alive. When Burnett returns, he's shot down. The other stranger is cattle buyer Ted Post, who is really a Dallas Marshal Ed Sherwood, also seeking a criminal.

== Cast ==
- Monte Hale as Marshal Ed Sherwood Posing as Ted Post
- Paul Hurst as Huck Homer
- Nan Leslie as Susan Devlin
- Roy Barcroft as Clip Pearson
- Damian O'Flynn as Bruce Burnett
- Myron Healey as Larry Devlin
- Ray Walker as Harvey Masters
- John Hamilton as Man with Bracelet
- Clarence Straight as Bartender
- Robert Williams as Rodney

== Comic book adaptation ==
- Fawcett: Pioneer Marshal (1950)
