= Paul Hurst (actor) =

American actor (1888–1953)

Paul Causey Hurst
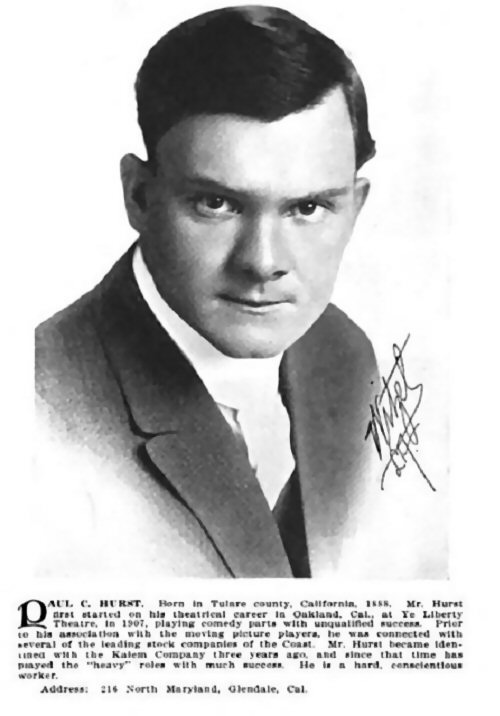
- Who's Who in the Film World, 1914
- Born: October 15, 1888; Traver, California, U.S.
- Died: February 27, 1953 (aged 64)
- Occupations: Actor, film director
- Years active: 1912–1953
- Spouse(s): Hedda Nova (m. 1919; died 1981)

Paul Causey Hurst (October 15, 1888 – February 27, 1953) was an American actor and film director.

== Career ==
Hurst in The Sphinx (1933)

Hurst was born in Traver, California, of one quarter Cherokee and one quarter Seneca descent. In 1933 he performed in "Eve the Fifth" at the Beverly Hills Little Theatre for Professionals.

Hurst is best remembered for two roles: as the Yankee deserter who trespasses at Tara and is shot by Scarlett in Gone with the Wind (1939); and his characterization of the drunken and sadistic vigilante Smith in The Ox Bow Incident (1943).

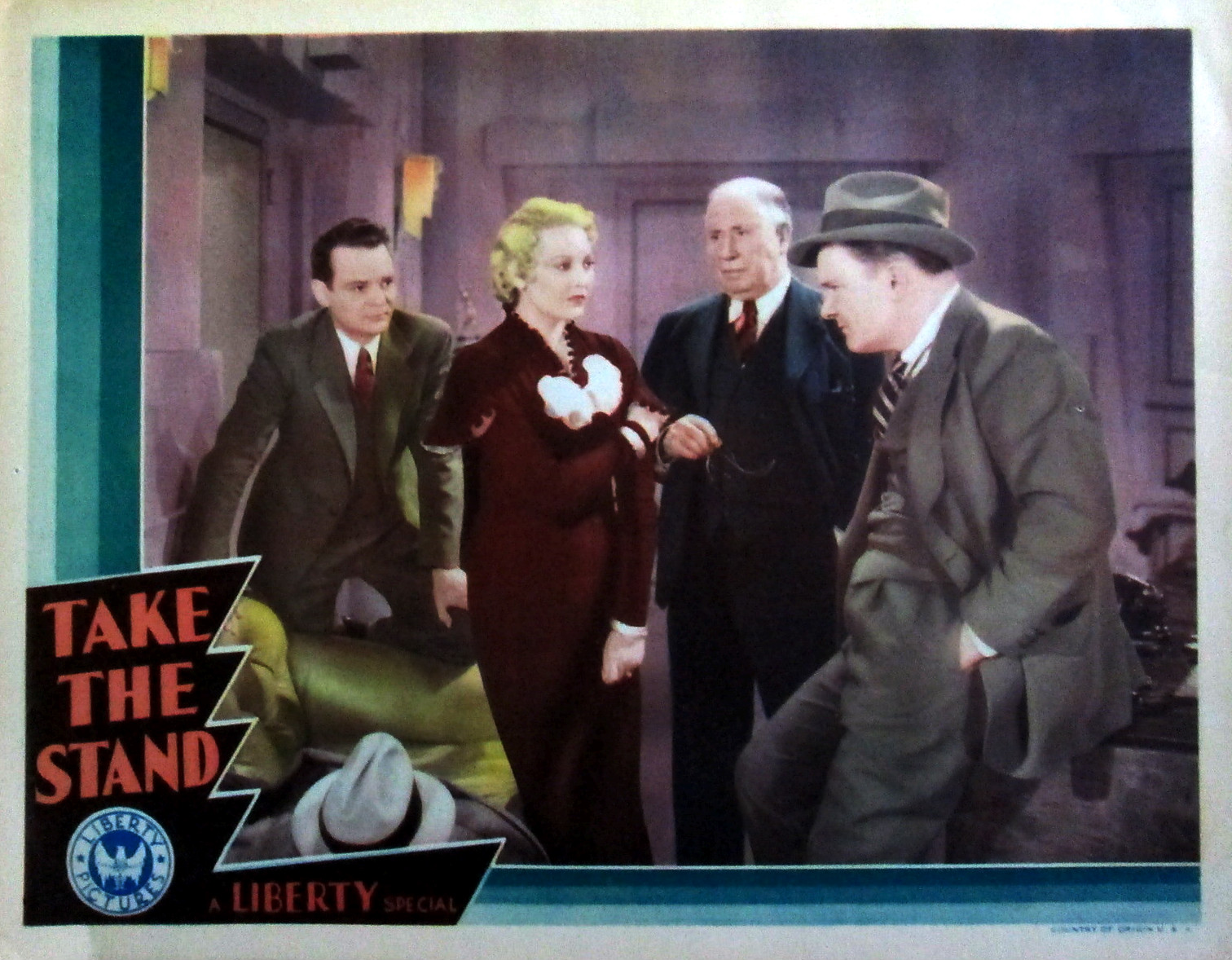
Lobby card for Take the Stand (1934), L-R: Russell Hopton, Thelma Todd, unknown player, and Paul Hurst

However, he was most proud of his role as a crotchety, old rancher who refuses water to a Quaker family in the movie Angel and the Badman, until John Wayne's character convinces him to share the water. It was after this latter role that Republic Pictures signed him as the comic sidekick in Monte Hale's Western series. His last film was John Ford's The Sun Shines Bright.

== Personal life and death ==
Hurst was married to actress Hedda Nova. He committed suicide on February 27, 1953.

== Filmography ==
=== As actor ===
- Jean of the Jail (1912) – Alcalde
- The Stolen Invention (1912) – John Rawley, a Promoter
- The Outlaw (1912) – Black Pete
- The Loneliness of the Hills (1912) – The Indian Chief
- When Youth Meets Youth (1912) – Will Thurvell, the Foreman
- The Redskin Raiders (1912)
- Shannon of the Sixth (1914) – Captain Arlington
- The Invisible Power (1914) – Lorenzo
- The Hazards of Helen (1914) – Benton – a Foreman [Ch. 2]
- The Tragedy on Bear Mountain (1915, Short) – Steve Barty
- The Girl Detective (1915) – (Episode #1, 2, etc.)
- Mysteries of the Grand Hotel (1915)
- The Pitfall (1915) – Garvin – a Crooked Politician
- Stingaree (1915) – Howie – Stingaree's Partner
- The Social Pirates (1916) – Mona's Accomplice
- Whispering Smith (1916) – Murray Sinclair
- Medicine Bend (1916) – Murray Sinclair
- Judith of the Cumberlands (1916) – Blatchley Turrentine
- The Diamond Runners (1916) – Paul – the Brains of the I.D.B.
- The Manager of the B & A (1916) – Roger Oakley
- Lass of the Lumberlands (1916)
- The Railroad Raiders (1917) – Steve Arnold
- The Further Adventures of Stingaree (1917) – Howie
- Rimrock Jones (1918) – Ike Bray
- With Hoops of Steel (1918)
- Smashing Through (1918) – Stevens
- The Tiger's Trail (1919, director)
- Lightning Bryce (1919) – Powder Solvang
- The Roaring Road (1926)
- The High Hand (1926) – Chris Doble
- The Fighting Ranger (1926)
- Battling Kid (1926)
- The Outlaw Express (1926) – Secretary
- Son of a Gun (1926)
- The Midnight Message (1926, director)
- Blue Streak O'Neil (1927)
- Rider of the Law (1927) – Henry Baker
- The Overland Stage (1927) – Hell-A-Poppin' Casey
- The Range Raiders (1927)
- The Man from Hard Pan (1927) – Larry Lackey
- Outlaw's Paradise (1927)
- The Range Riders (1927)
- The Devil's Saddle (1927) – 'Swig' Moran
- The Red Raiders (1927) – Sergeant Murphy
- The Valley of the Giants (1927) – Randeau
- Buttons (1927) – Slugger McGlue
- The Cossacks (1928) – Sitchi
- Lilac Time (1928) – (uncredited)
- The Rainbow (1929) – Pat
- The Lawless Legion (1929) – Ramirez
- The California Mail (1929) – Rowdy Ryan
- Tide of Empire (1929) – Poppy
- Sailor's Holiday (1929) – Jimmylegs
- Oh, Yeah! (1929) – Railroad-yard Superintendent
- The Racketeer (1929) – Mehaffy
- His First Command (1929) – Sgt. Westbrook
- Officer O'Brien (1930) – Captain Antrim
- Lucky Larkin (1930) – Pete Brierson
- The Swellhead (1930) – Mugsy
- Mountain Justice (1930) – Lem Harland
- The Runaway Bride (1930) – Sergeant Daly
- Shadow of the Law (1930) – Pete Shore
- Hot Curves (1930) – 'Slug', Baseball Player
- Paradise Island (1930) – Beauty
- Borrowed Wives (1930) – Bull Morgan
- The Lottery Bride (1930) – Lottery Agent (uncredited)
- The Third Alarm (1930) – 'Beauty' Johnson
- The Single Sin (1931) – Slug
- The Secret Six (1931) – Nick Mizoski, the Gouger
- Kick In (1931) – Detective Whip Fogarty
- Sweepstakes (1931) – Cantina Bartender
- That's My Line (1931, Short) – Mexican Bandit
- The Public Defender (1931) – Doc
- Bad Company (1931) – Goldie's Butler
- The Secret Witness (1931) – Officer Brannigan (uncredited)
- Maker of Men (1931) – Gabby
- Panama Flo (1932) – Al
- State's Attorney (1932) – Captain Morgan
- My Pal, the King (1932) – Red
- The Thirteenth Guest (1932) – Detective Grump
- Hold 'Em Jail (1932) – Coach Butch
- The Phantom President (1932) – Sailor (uncredited)
- The Big Stampede (1932) – Arizona
- Men Are Such Fools (1932) – Stiles
- Island of Lost Souls (1932) – Donahue
- Grand Slam (1933) – Canadian Bridge Player (uncredited)
- Out All Night (1933) – Henry (uncredited)
- Terror Aboard (1933) – Boatswain
- The Sphinx (1933) – Detective Terrence Aloysius Hogan
- Hold Your Man (1933) – Aubrey C. Mitchell (uncredited)
- Tugboat Annie (1933) – Sam
- Saturday's Millions (1933) – Doc Maloney, Trainer
- Day of Reckoning (1933) – Harry
- The Women in His Life (1933) – Paul
- Queen Christina (1933) – Swedish Soldier (uncredited)
- Nana (1934) – Nana's First Employer (uncredited)
- The Big Race (1934) – Skipper O'Neal
- The Line-Up (1934) – Detective Sergeant Doyle
- A Very Honorable Guy (1934) – Butler (uncredited)
- Sing and Like It (1934) – Tied Up Mug (uncredited)
- Charlie Chan's Courage (1934) – Minor Role
- Midnight Alibi (1934) – Babe the Butcher
- Take the Stand (1934) – Denny O'Brien
- Among the Missing (1934) – Police Capt. Bill Connors
- Tomorrow's Youth (1934) – Detective
- Sequoia (1934) – Bergman
- Romance in Manhattan (1935) – Joe, Policeman (uncredited)
- Maybe It's Love (1935) – Expressman (uncredited)
- Carnival (1935) – Policeman (uncredited)
- Shadow of Doubt (1935) – Police Lt. Jack Sackville
- Wilderness Mail (1935) – Jules, Henchman
- Mississippi (1935) – Hefty
- Star of Midnight (1935) – Detective Corbett (uncredited)
- The Case of the Curious Bride (1935) – Fibo Morgan, Florabelle's Cousin (uncredited)
- Public Hero No. 1 (1935) – Rufe Parker
- Calm Yourself (1935) – Detective Roscoe
- The Daring Young Man (1935) – Prison Guard (uncredited)
- The Gay Deception (1935) – Bell Captain
- Riffraff (1936) – Belcher
- It Had to Happen (1936) – Workman (uncredited)
- The Robin Hood of El Dorado (1936) – Wilson
- Mr. Deeds Goes to Town (1936) – 1st Deputy (uncredited)
- Blackmailer (1936) – Inspector Killian
- To Mary - with Love (1936) – Drunk
- I'd Give My Life (1936) – Conly
- The Gay Desperado (1936) – American Detective
- North of Nome (1936) – Carlson
- We Who Are About to Die (1937) – Tip Fuller
- Trouble in Morocco (1937) – Tiger Malone
- Song of the City (1937) – First Detective (uncredited)
- This Is My Affair (1937) – Bowler
- Angel's Holiday (1937) – Sergeant Murphy
- Fifty Roads to Town (1937) – Tom
- Slave Ship (1937) – Drunk
- You Can't Beat Love (1937) – Foreman Butch Mehaffey
- Super-Sleuth (1937) – Motorcycle Cop
- Wake Up and Live (1937) – McCabe
- The Legion of Missing Men (1937) – Muggsy
- You Can't Have Everything (1937) – Truck Driver (uncredited)
- She's No Lady (1937) – Cop
- Wife, Doctor and Nurse (1937) – Bill
- Danger – Love at Work (1937) – Police Officer
- The Lady Fights Back (1937) – Maloney
- Ali Baba Goes to Town (1937) – Captain
- Second Honeymoon (1937) – Dennis Huggins
- 45 Fathers (1937) – Policeman (uncredited)
- In Old Chicago (1938) – Edward (Mitch) Mitchell
- No Time to Marry (1938) – Sergeant
- Rebecca of Sunnybrook Farm (1938) – Mug
- Island in the Sky (1938) – Happy
- Alexander's Ragtime Band (1938) – Bill Mulligan
- Josette (1938) – A. Adolphus Heyman
- Prison Break (1938) – Soapy
- My Lucky Star (1938) – Louie
- Hold That Co-ed (1938) – Slapsy
- The Last Express (1938) – Asst. Dist. Atty. Springer
- Secrets of a Nurse (1938) – Slice Cavanaugh
- Thanks for Everything (1938) – Guard
- Topper Takes a Trip (1938) – Bartender
- Cafe Society (1939) – Bartender
- Broadway Serenade (1939) – Reynolds
- The Kid from Kokomo (1939) – First Old Man in Fistfight
- It Could Happen to You (1939) – Sandy
- Each Dawn I Die (1939) – Garsky
- Bad Lands (1939) – Curly Tom
- Quick Millions (1939) – Sheriff
- On Your Toes (1939) – Variety Club Bartender (uncredited)
- Heaven with a Barbed Wire Fence (1939) – Empire State Building Guard (uncredited)
- Remember? (1939) – Policeman
- Gone with the Wind (1939) – the Yankee Deserter
- Castle on the Hudson (1940) – Guard (uncredited)
- Star Dust (1940) – Mac, Amalgamated Lab Tech
- Edison, the Man (1940) – Sheriff
- Torrid Zone (1940) – Daniels
- They Drive By Night (1940) – Pete Haig (uncredited)
- South to Karanga (1940) – Slats
- The Westerner (1940) – Chickenfoot
- Men Against the Sky (1940) – Mechanic (uncredited)
- Spring Parade (1940) – Headwaiter (uncredited)
- Tugboat Annie Sails Again (1940) – Pete
- Goin' Fishin' (1940, Short) – Bus conductor
- Street of Memories (1940) – Minor Role (uncredited)
- Bowery Boy (1940) – Blubber Mullins
- Tall, Dark and Handsome (1941) – Biff Sage
- Virginia (1941) – Thomas
- Petticoat Politics (1941) – Slats O'Dell
- The Great Mr. Nobody (1941) – Michael O'Connor
- Caught in the Draft (1941) – Sgt. Burns
- The Parson of Panamint (1941) – Jake Waldren
- This Woman is Mine (1941) – Second Mate Mumford
- Ellery Queen and the Murder Ring (1941) – Page
- Pardon My Stripes (1942) – Feets
- Sundown Jim (1942) – Broderick
- Night in New Orleans (1942) – Sergeant Casper Riordan
- Calaboose (1943) – Bartender Ed
- Young and Willing (1943) – First Cop
- Hi'ya, Chum (1943) – Archie Billings
- The Ox Bow Incident (1943) – Monty Smith
- Coney Island (1943) – Louie
- The Sky's the Limit (1943) – Dock Foreman (uncredited)
- Jack London (1943) – 'Lucky Luke' Lannigan
- December 7th (1943) – World War I Ghost Soldier
- The Ghost That Walks Alone (1944) – Sheriff Slim Carson (uncredited)
- Summer Storm (1944) – Officer Orloff
- Greenwich Village (1944) – Milkman (scenes deleted)
- Barbary Coast Gent (1944) – Jake Compton
- Girl Rush (1944) – Muley
- Something for the Boys (1944) – Defense Plant Foreman (uncredited)
- The Big Show-Off (1945) – The Devil
- Her Lucky Night (1945) – Maloney (uncredited)
- Nob Hill (1945) – El Dorado Doorman (uncredited)
- Penthouse Rhythm (1945) – Police Desk Sergeant
- Scared Stiff (1945) – Sheriff
- Steppin' in Society (1945) – Cookie
- Midnight Manhunt (1945) – Murphy
- The Dolly Sisters (1945) – Tim Dowling (uncredited)
- Dakota (1945) – Captain Spotts
- Murder in the Music Hall (1946) – Hobarth
- The Virginian (1946) – Bartender (uncredited)
- In Old Sacramento (1946) – Stagecoach Driver
- Death Valley (1946) – Sergeant Dailey
- Plainsman and the Lady (1946) – Al
- Angel and the Badman (1947) – Frederick Carson
- Under California Skies (1947) – Lucky John Hawkins
- On Our Merry Way (1948) – Sheriff (uncredited)
- Madonna of the Desert (1948) – Pete Connors
- California Firebrand (1948) – Chuck Waggoner
- Who Killed Doc Robbin (1948) – Jailer
- Old Los Angeles (1948) – Bartender (uncredited)
- Heart of Virginia (1948) – Whit Galtry
- The Arizona Ranger (1948) – Ben Riddle
- Son of God's Country (1948) – Eli Walker
- Yellow Sky (1948) – Drunk (uncredited)
- Gun Smugglers (1949) – Sergeant Hasty Jones
- Prince of the Plains (1949) – Sheriff Hank Hartley
- Law of the Golden West (1949) – Otis Ellis
- Outcasts of the Trail (1949) – Doc Meadowlark
- South of Rio (1949) – Andy Weems
- San Antone Ambush (1949) – Happy Daniels
- Ranger of Cherokee Strip (1949) – Sheriff Jug Mason
- Pioneer Marshal (1949) – Huck Homer
- The Vanishing Westerner (1950) – Waldorf Worthington
- The Old Frontier (1950) – Skipper Horton
- The Missourians (1950) – Lawyer John Finn
- Million Dollar Pursuit (1951) – Ray Harvey
- Big Jim McLain (1952) – Mr. Lexiter
- Toughest Man in Arizona (1952) – Dalton
- The Sun Shines Bright (1953) – Army Sgt. Jimmy Bagby (final film role)

=== As director ===
- The Hazards of Helen (1914 serial) (uncredited)
- A Woman in the Web (1918 serial)
- Play Straight or Fight (1918)
- Lightning Bryce (1919-1920 serial)
- The Kingfisher's Roost (1921)
- The Crow's Nest (1922)
- Battling Bunyan (1924)
- Folly of Youth (1925)
- The Law of the Snow Country (1926)
- Blue Streak O'Neil (1926)
- The Roaring Road (1926)
- Rider of the Law (1927)
