= Monte Hale =

American actor and country musician (1919–2009)

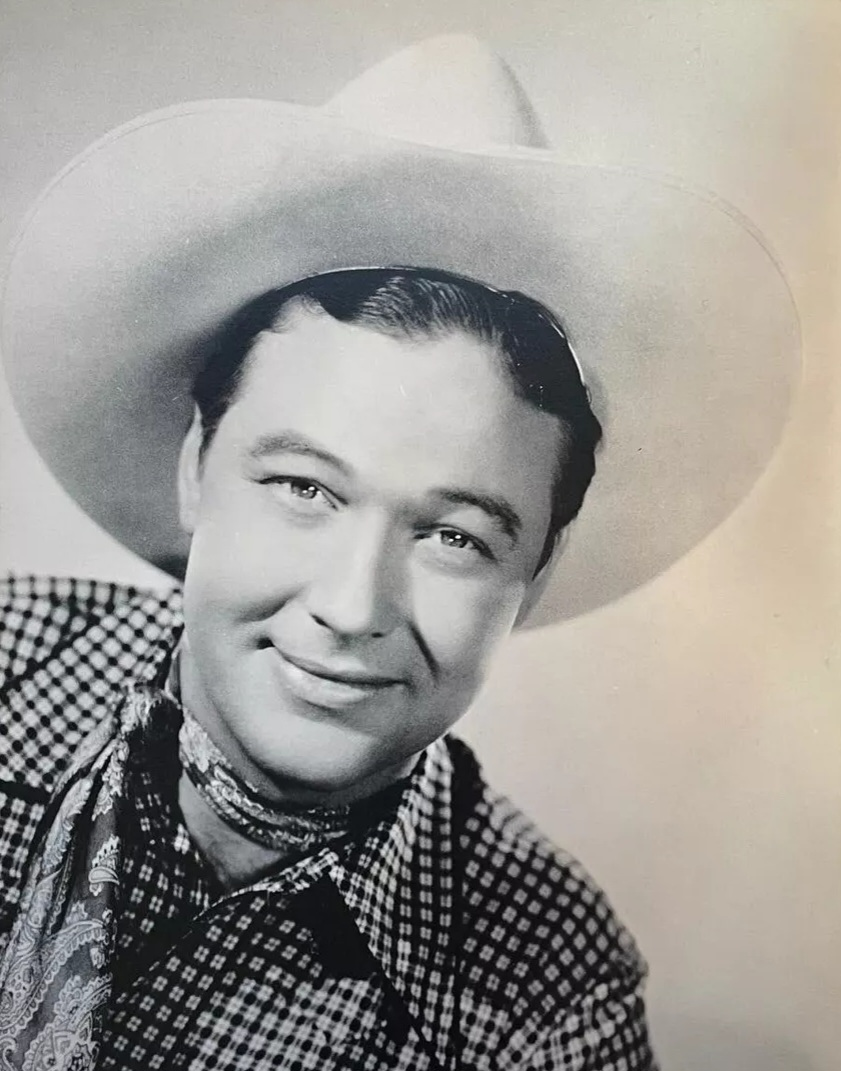
- Hale c.1940s
- Born: Samuel "Buren" Ely; June 8, 1919; Ada, Oklahoma, U.S.
- Died: March 29, 2009 (aged 89); Studio City, California, U.S.
- Resting place: Forest Lawn Memorial Park, Hollywood Hills, California
- Occupations: Actor, singer
- Years active: 1944–1968
- Spouse: Joanne Hale

Monte Hale (born Samuel Buren Ely; June 8, 1919 – March 29, 2009) was an American B-Western film star and country musician.

== Biography ==
Sometimes reported to have been born in San Angelo, Texas, Hale was actually born in Ada, Oklahoma but grew up in Shawnee, Oklahoma, attending Washington Grade School and Shawnee High School (Texas birthplace reportedly sounded better for the movies.) After working as a laborer at various jobs in Ada and Enid, Oklahoma, Herod Ely settled in Shawnee and became an evangelist with the Church of God. His oldest son, Buren, was known to use his musical talent during his father's services. The boy had gathered pecans and picked cotton to earn money to buy his first guitar. Soon he was singing and playing the guitar wherever he could find an audience. His parents had divorced and both had remarried, with youngest brother Bobby going with his mother. In 1934, 16-year-old Buren left home, as many boys did during the Depression. He headed for Houston and found work playing his music. From there he went to Albuquerque, New Mexico, working on a radio station. A man there convinced him to head to California, but all he was able to do there was scratch together a small band and play at a winter resort dude ranch. After four years he returned to Texas Vaudeville and local rodeo shows. During World War II he got a job as a replacement guitarist with the Stars Over Texas Bond Drive, joining several Republic Pictures celebrities and staff. This introduced him to western stars like Chill Wills and convinced Phil Isley to recommended him to Herbert Yates, head of Republic Pictures. Yates agreed to "test" him but he must fund his own trip. Some friends gave him $200 and he flew to Los Angeles.

It was 1944 and he signed with the company for seven years and changed his name from Buren Ely to "Monte Hale." He soon starred in his first major role in Home on the Range. He appeared in some of the first westerns filmed in colour and was given use of Roy Rogers' musical sidekicks, the "Sons of the Pioneers" for one of his movies. He was often cast as a young cowboy, with cameos by Don Barry, Allen Lane and Roy Rogers and Dale Evans. Hale then played more traditional Western heroes in films set in the late 19th century. By 1947 the formula was set with Paul Hurst joining the series as Hale's sidekick and Riders of the Purple Sage providing the music. At this point he ceased playing the character named for himself.

In 1948, he made a trip back to see friends and family in his hometown of Shawnee plus appearances in 18 other Oklahoma towns to promote his latest movie, Son of God's Country. He reported that he had to leave his horse Pardner behind.

Hale was also a recording star and appeared in a series of Western comics published by Fawcett Comics. Beginning in 1948, Hale had his own title with more than 50 issues. In fact, his comic book stardom lasted longer than his film stardom. Republic began cutting back on the Western genre moving to television. He finished his Republic contract with an appearance in the Roy Rogers-Dale Evans movie Trail of Robin Hood with fellow Republic stars Rex Allen and Rocky Lane.

Hale made many public appearances at rodeos and other Western shows. He played a villain role in the 1954's Yukon Vengeance. His last movie appearance was in Giant in 1956, where part of his job was to teach James Dean to use a lariat. He appeared in a few television roles and movies up until 1966. On November 12, 2004, for his work in movies, he received a star on the Hollywood Walk of Fame. He was also instrumental in the foundation of what is now the Autry National Center of the American West.

Played "Sergeant" on "Gunsmoke" in the 1959 episode "Blue Horse" (S4E38).

In 1998, a Golden Palm Star on the Palm Springs, California, Walk of Stars was dedicated to him.

== Death ==
He died at 89 in Studio City, California after a long illness; he was survived by his wife of 31 years, Joanne. He was buried at the Forest Lawn Memorial Park in Hollywood Hills, California.

== Filmography ==
Year	Title	Role	Notes
1944	The Big Bonanza	Saloon Singer	
1945	The Topeka Terror	Settler	Uncredited
1945	Steppin' in Society		Uncredited
1945	Oregon Trail	Train Passenger	Uncredited
1945	The Purple Monster Strikes	Dr. Harvey	Serial, [Chs. 13-14]
1945	Bandits of the Badlands	Dr. Steve Carson	
1945	Rough Riders of Cheyenne	Ward Tuttle	
1945	Colorado Pioneers	Cowhand That Quits	
1946	The Phantom Rider	Cowboy Cass	Serial, [Ch. 1]
1946	California Gold Rush	Pete - Driver That Quits	
1946	Home on the Range	Himself	
1946	Sun Valley Cyclone	Jeff	
1946	Man from Rainbow Valley	Himself	
1946	Out California Way	Himself	
1947	Last Frontier Uprising	Himself	
1947	Along the Oregon Trail	Himself	
1947	Under Colorado Skies	Himself	
1948	California Firebrand	Himself	
1948	The Timber Trail	Himself	
1948	Son of God's Country	Himself	
1949	Prince of the Plains	Bat Masterson	
1949	Law of the Golden West	Bill Cody	
1949	Outcasts of the Trail	Pat Garrett	
1949	South of Rio	Jeff Lanning	
1949	San Antone Ambush	Lt. Ross Kincaid	
1949	Ranger of Cherokee Strip	Ranger Steve Howard	
1949	Pioneer Marshal	Marshal Ed Sherwood Posing as Ted Post	
1950	The Vanishing Westerner	Chris Adams	
1950	The Old Frontier	Marshal Barney Regan	
1950	The Missourians	Marshal Bill Blades	
1950	Trail of Robin Hood	Himself	
1954	Yukon Vengeance	Jim Barclay	
1956	Giant	Bale Clinch	
1962	The Man Who Shot Liberty Valance		Uncredited
1966	The Chase	Dental Delegate	Uncredited
