= List of interments at Hollywood Forever Cemetery =

The following is a list of notable individuals interred or inurned at Hollywood Forever Cemetery in Los Angeles, California, United States.

== A ==
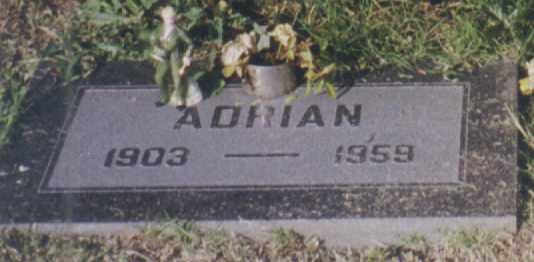
Headstone of costume designer Adrian

- David Abel (1883–1973), cinematographer (aged 89)
- Joseph Achron (1886–1943), musician (aged 56)
- Walter Ackerman (1881–1938), actor (aged 57)
- Bert Adams (1891–1940), MLB player (aged 49)
- Don Adams (1923–2005), actor, Agent Maxwell Smart on TV's Get Smart (aged 82)
- Louis Adlon (1907–1947), actor (aged 39)
- Renée Adorée (1898–1933), actress (aged 35)
- Adrian (1903–1959), MGM costume designer (aged 56)
- Helen Ainsworth (1902–1961), actress/producer (aged 59)
- Spottiswoode Aitken (1868–1933), actor (aged 64)
- Albert Akst (1899–1958), film editor (aged 57)
- Norman Alden (1924–2012), actor (aged 87)
- Erville Alderson (1882–1957), actor (aged 74)
- Frank Alexander (1879–1937), actor (aged 58)
- J. Grubb Alexander (1887–1932), screenwriter (aged 44)
- Charlie Allen (1942–1990), singer (aged 48)
- Lester Allen (1891–1949), actor (aged 57)
- Murray Alper (1904–1984), actor (aged 80)
- Albert Edward Anson (1879–1936), actor (aged 56)
- Andrew Arbuckle (1887–1939), actor (aged 51)
- Gus Arnheim (1897–1955), composer (aged 58)
- Max Asher (1885–1957), actor (aged 71)
- Sylvia Ashley (1904–1977), actress and socialite (aged 73)
- Gertrude Astor (1887–1977), actress (aged 90)
- Hal August (1890–1918), silent film actor (aged 27)
- David Avadon (1948–2009), magician and illusionist (aged 60)
- Charles Avery (1873–1926), actor (aged 53)
- Agnes Ayres (1892–1940), actress (aged 48)

== B ==
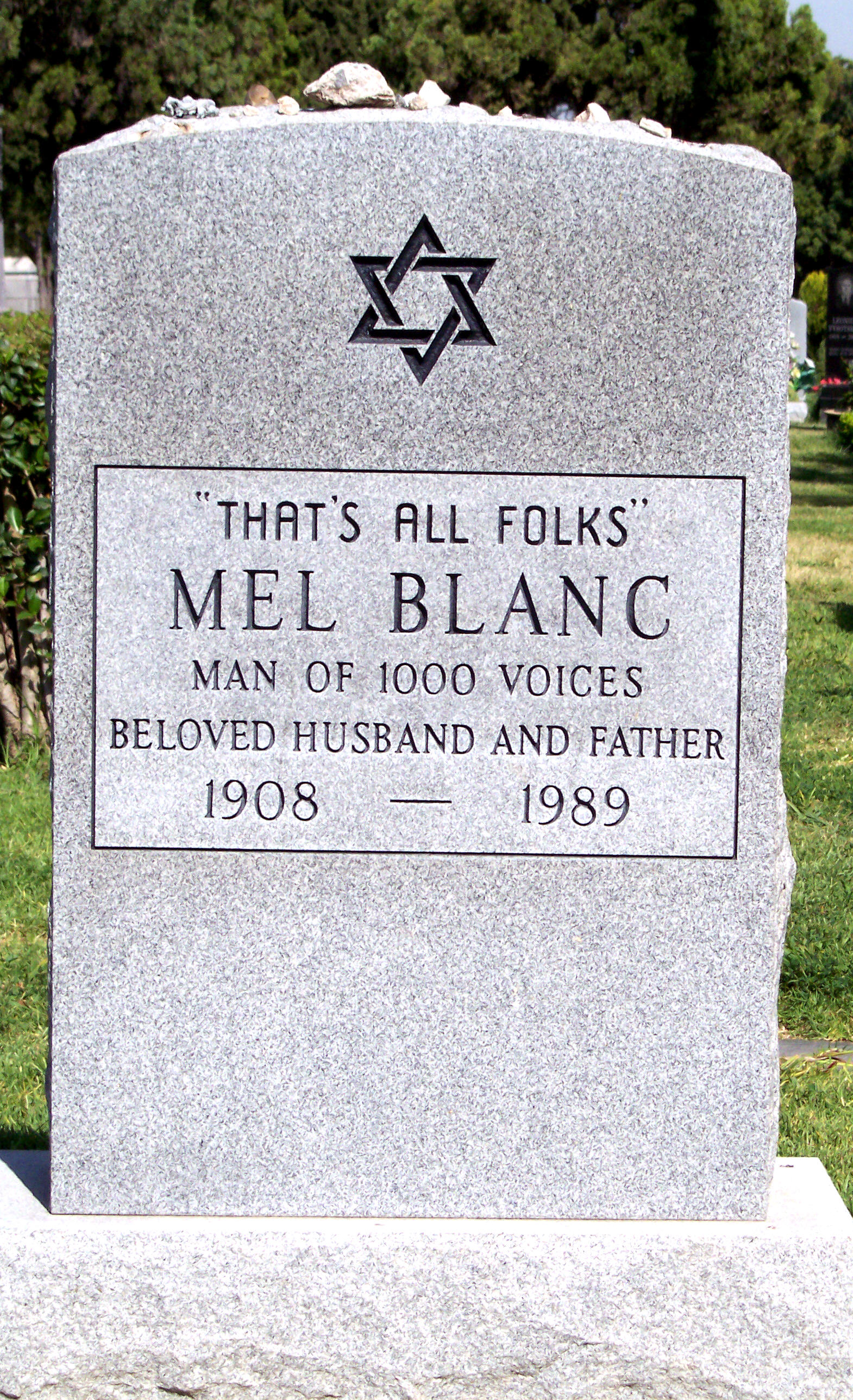
Mel Blanc's tombstone

- Leah Baird (1883–1971), actress and screenwriter (aged 88)
- Eve Babitz (1943–2021), author and visual artist (aged 78)
- Charles Graham Baker (1883–1950), screenwriter and director (aged 66)
- Reginald Baker (1884–1953), actor, athlete and stuntman (aged 69)
- Fred J. Balshofer (1877–1969), director and producer (aged 91)
- Peter Bardens (1945–2002), musician, founding member of the progressive rock band Camel (aged 57)
- George Barnes (1892–1953), cinematographer (aged 60)
- Jackson Barnett (1856–1934), folk figure (aged 78)
- Vince Barnett (1902–1977), actor (aged 75)
- James O. Barrows (1855–1925), actor (aged 70)
- Anne Bauchens (1882–1967), film editor (aged 85)
- Frank Beal (1862–1934), actor, director and screenwriter (aged 72)
- James H. Beatty (1836–1927), federal judge in Idaho (aged 91)
- William Beaudine (1892–1970), director and actor (aged 78)
- Tony Beckley (1930–1980), actor (aged 50)
- Charles Belcher (1872–1943), actor (aged 71)
- Monta Bell (1891–1958), director (aged 66)
- Curtis Benton (1880–1938), actor (aged 58)
- Clara Beranger (1886–1956), screenwriter (aged 70)
- Pearl Berg (1909–2024), supercentenarian (aged 114)
- Elmer Berger (1891–1952), inventor of the rear-view mirror (aged 61)
- Harry Bernard (1878–1940), actor and comedian (aged 62)
- Vic Berton (1896–1951), musician (aged 55)
- Charles Beyer (1893–1953), actor (aged 60)
- Herman Bing (1889–1947), actor (aged 57)
- Maurice Black (1891–1938), actor (aged 47)
- Paula Blackton (1881–1930), actress and director (aged 48)
- Richard Blackwell (1922–2008), fashion critic (aged 86)
- Mel Blanc (1908–1989), actor, comedian, and voice-over artist of Looney Tunes and Hanna-Barbera cartoons; his tombstone has his famous epitaph, "That's all folks" (aged 81)
- Lucille Bliss (1916–2012), actress and voice artist, best known as the voice of Smurfette from The Smurfs (aged 96)
- Lilian Bond (1908–1991), actress (aged 83)
- Gypsy Boots (1915–2004), fitness guru (aged 89)
- Egon Brecher (1880–1946), actor and director (aged 66)
- Joseph Carl Breil (1870–1926), singer, composer and director (aged 55)
- El Brendel (1890–1964), actor and comedian (aged 74)
- Nicholas Brendon (1971-2026), actor (aged 54)
- Felix Bressart (1892–1949), actor (aged 57)
- Charlotte Bridgwood (1861–1929), stage actress (aged 68)
- Jack Brooks (1912–1971), composer (aged 59)
- Coral Browne (1913–1991), actress (aged 77)
- Sam Buffington (1931–1960), actor (aged 28)
- Edward Bunker (1933–2005), actor, screenwriter and novelist (aged 71)

== C ==
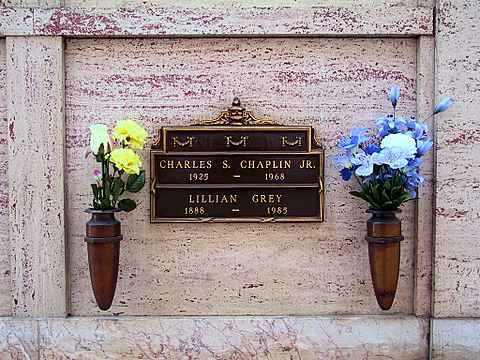
Tomb of Charles S. Chaplin Jr.

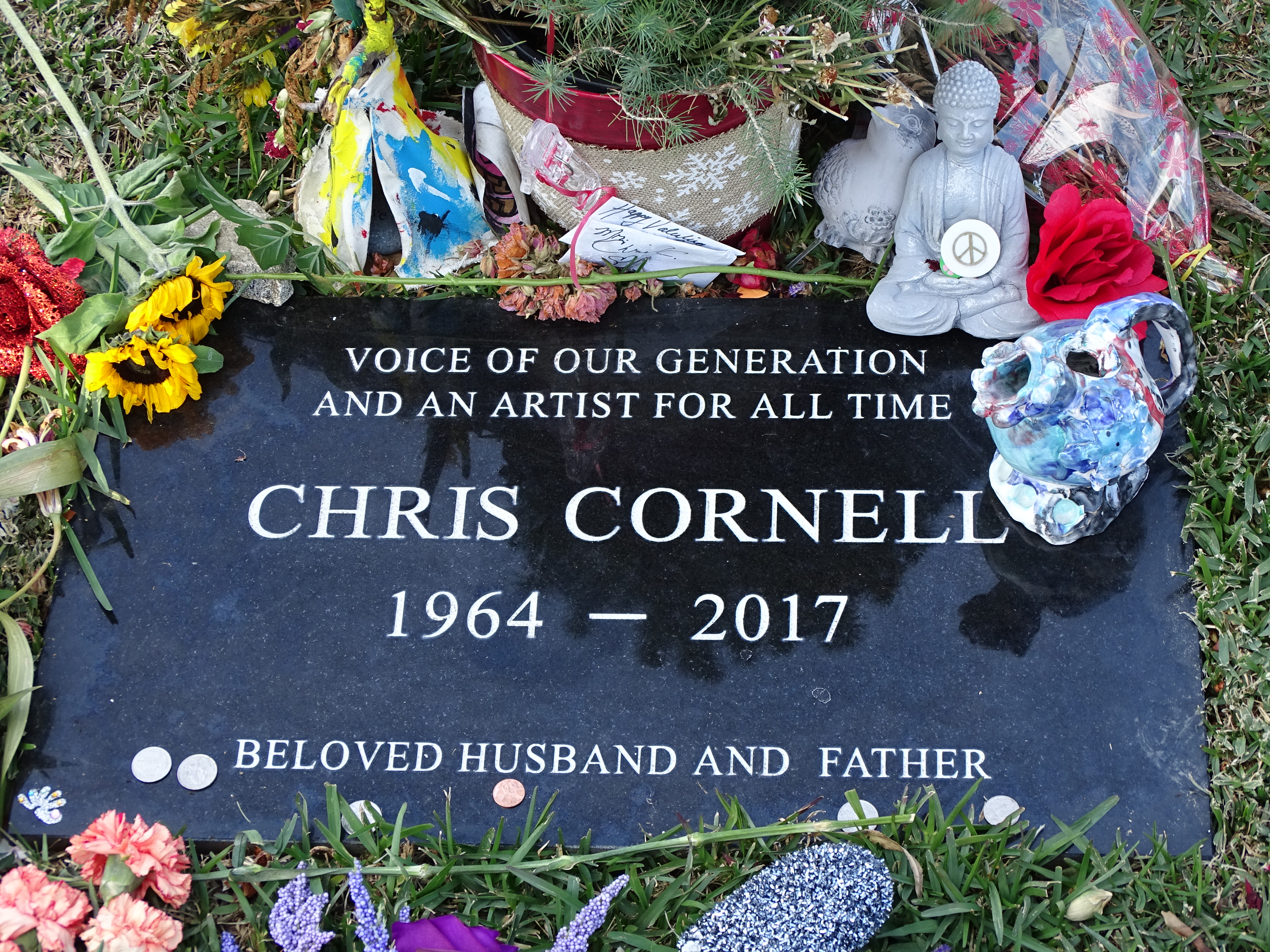
Grave of Chris Cornell

- Louis Calhern (1895–1956), actor (aged 61)
- Edwin Carewe (1883–1940), actor, director, producer and screenwriter (aged 56)
- Horace B. Carpenter (1875–1945), actor (aged 70)
- Alexander Carr (1878–1946), actor (aged 68)
- Lynn Cartwright (1927–2004), actress, and wife of Leo Gordon (aged 77)
- Joseph Cawthorn (1868–1949), actor (aged 80)
- Harry Chandler (1864–1944) publisher of the Los Angeles Times and investor (aged 80)
- Helen Chandler (1906–1965), actress (aged 59) (originally placed in the vaults at Chapel of the Pines Crematory, ashes relocated to Hollywood Forever in 2023)
- Lane Chandler (1899–1972), actor (aged 73)
- Charles Chaplin Jr. (1925–1968), actor, son of Charlie Chaplin (aged 42)
- Hannah Chaplin (1865–1928), actress, mother of Charlie Chaplin (aged 63)
- Emile Chautard (1864–1934), actor, director and screenwriter (aged 69)
- Al Christie (1881–1951), director, producer and screenwriter (aged 69)
- Charles Christie (1880–1955), movie studio owner (aged 75)
- Gertrude Claire (1852–1928), actress (aged 75)
- William Andrews Clark Jr. (1877–1934), founder of the Los Angeles Philharmonic (aged 57)
- Lana Clarkson (1962–2003), actress and model (aged 40)
- Yvonne Craig (1937-2015), actress (aged 78) (cremated here)
- Angelica Cob-Baehler (1971–2018), music industry executive (aged 47)
- Iron Eyes Cody (1904–1999), actor (aged 94)
- Art Cohn (1909–1958), screenwriter (aged 48)
- Harry Cohn (1891–1958), co-founder of Columbia Pictures (aged 66)
- Jack Cohn (1889–1956), co-founder of Columbia Pictures (aged 67)
- Ralph Cohn (1914–1959), founder of Screen Gems (aged 45)
- Robert Cohn (1920–1996), motion picture producer (aged 75)
- Cornelius Cole (1822–1924), California Congressional Representative and U.S. Senator (aged 102)
- Lois Collier (1919–1999), actress (aged 80)
- Pierre Collings (1902–1937), screenwriter (aged 35)
- Edward Connelly (1859–1928), actor (aged 68)
- Thomas F. Cooke (1863–1941), Los Angeles City Council member, (1929–1931) (aged 78)
- Lillian Kemble-Cooper (1892–1977), actress and singer, wife of actor Guy Bates Post (aged 85)
- Morty Corb (1917–1996), jazz musician (aged 78)
- Chris Cornell (1964–2017), musician and lead singer of the bands Soundgarden, Audioslave, and Temple of the Dog (aged 52)
- Lloyd Corrigan (1900–1969), actor (aged 69)
- Orlando da Costa (1929–2006), Portuguese Minister (aged 77)
- Norman Cousins (1915–1990), author and editor (aged 75)
- Howard Crampton (1865–1922), actor (aged 57)
- William H. Crane (1845–1928), actor (aged 82)
- Henry Cronjager (1877–1967), cinematographer, Father of Edward Cronjager (aged 90)
- Alan Crosland (1894–1936), director (aged 41)
- James Cruze (1884–1942), actor and director (aged 58)
- Irving Cummings (1888–1959), film director and actor (aged 70)
- Ruth Cummings (1894–1984), actress (aged 90)
- Kevin Curran (1957–2016), television writer (aged 59)
- William Hughes Curran (1893–1940), actor and director (aged 46)

== D ==
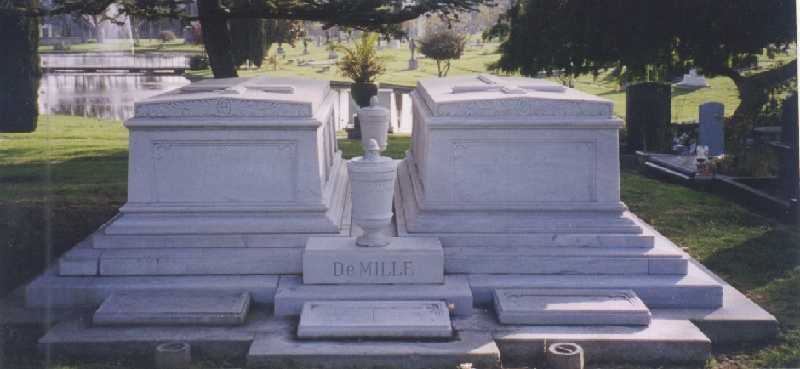
Tombs of the DeMille family

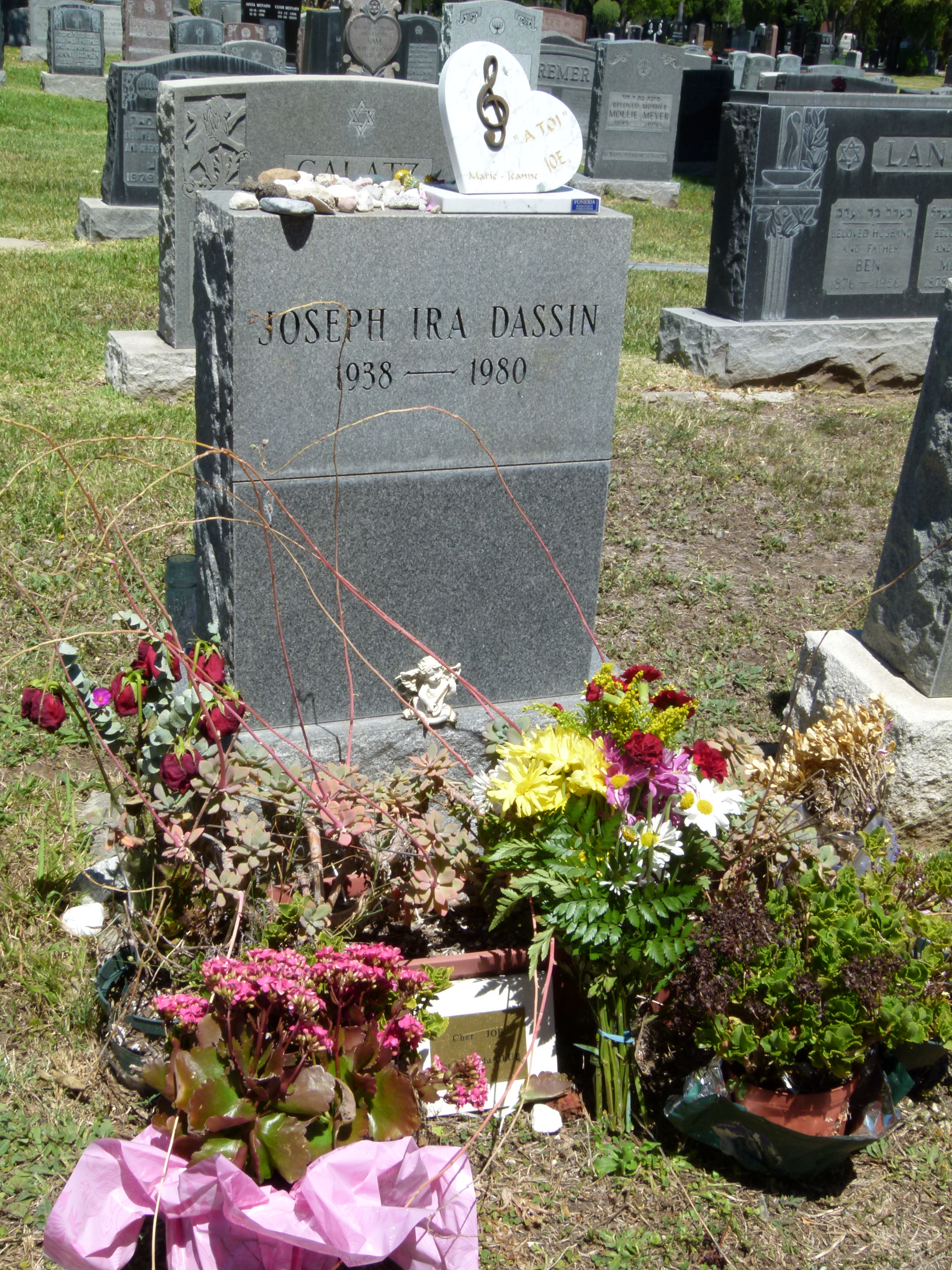
Tomb of Joe Dassin

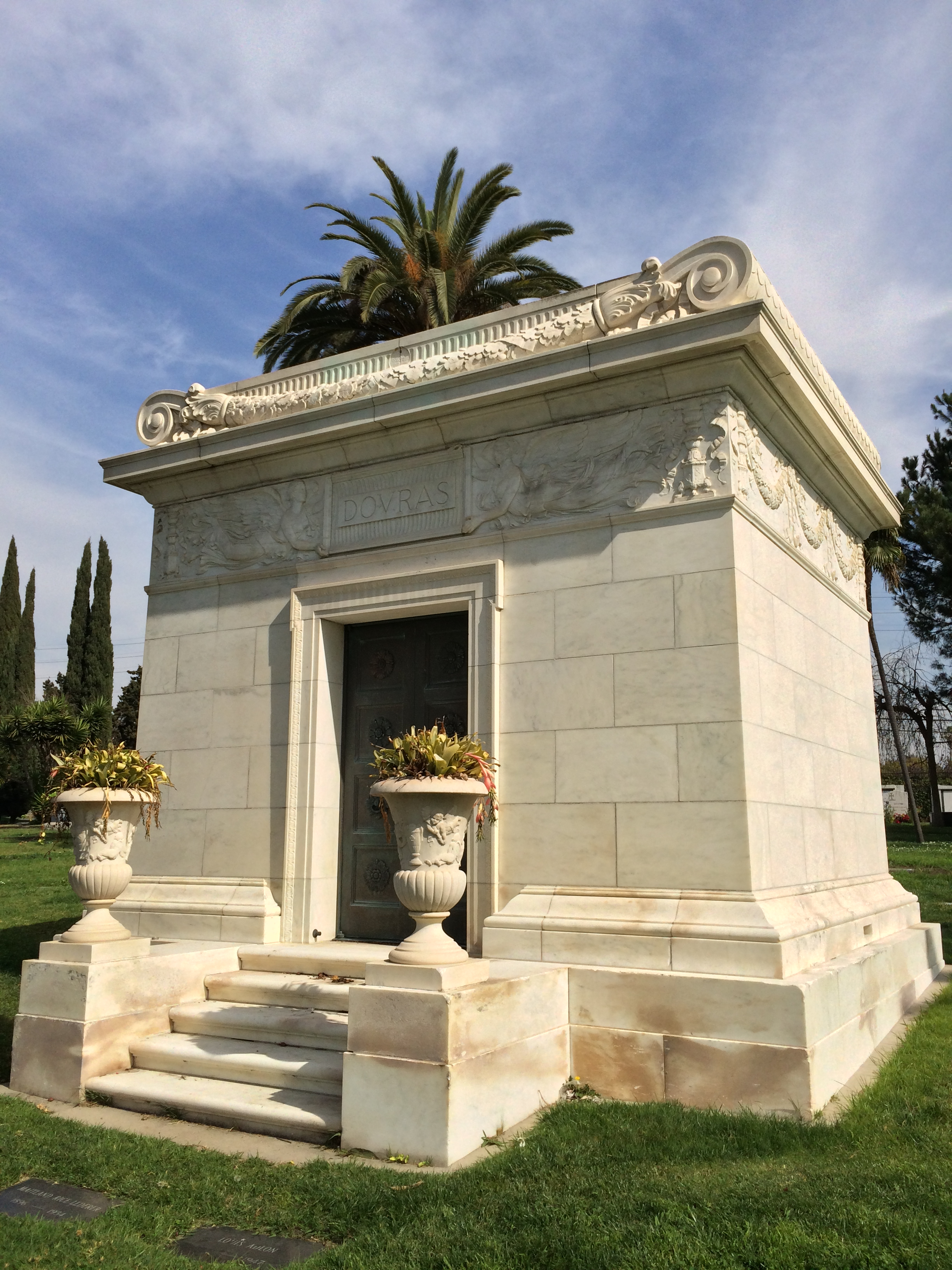
Mausoleum of Marion Davies

- Dick Dale (1937–2019), American Guitarist and pioneer of surf music (aged 81)
- Cass Daley (1915–1975), actress, comedian and singer (aged 59)
- Viola Dana (1897–1987), actress (aged 90)
- Eric Dane (1972-2026), actor (aged 53)
- Karl Dane (1886–1934), actor (aged 47)
- Bebe Daniels (1901–1971), actress (aged 70)
- Georgine Darcy (1931-2004), actress (aged 73)
- Joe Dassin (1938–1980), American-born French singer-songwriter (aged 41)
- Harry J. Davenport (1858–1929), actor (aged 71)
- Milla Davenport (1871–1936), actress (aged 65)
- Marion Davies (1897–1961), actress (aged 64)
- Reine Davies (1883–1938), actress (aged 51)
- Rosemary Davies (1903–1963), actress (aged 60)
- J. Gunnis Davis (1873–1937) English actor and director (aged 63)
- William De Vaull (1871–1945), actor (aged 74)
- Doris Deane (1901–1974), actress (aged 73)
- Ashton Dearholt (1894–1942), actor (aged 48)
- Harry Delmar (1892–1984), producer and director (aged 91)
- Agnes DeMille (1905–1993), dancer (aged 88)
- Cecil B. DeMille (1881–1959), director and producer (aged 77)
- Clara DeMille (1886–1956), screenwriter, and wife of William C. DeMille (aged 70)
- Constance Adams DeMille (1874–1960), actress, and wife of Cecil B. DeMille (aged 86)
- William C. DeMille (1878–1955), director and writer (aged 76)
- Barry Dennen (1938–2017), actor (aged 79)
- Oliver Perry Dennis (1858 – 1927), architect (aged 68)
- Leo Diamond (1915–1966), musician, songwriter, actor (aged 51)
- George Spiro Dibie (1931–2022), cinematographer (aged 90)
- Basil Dickey (1880–1958), screenwriter (aged 77)
- Gloria Dickson (1917–1945), actress (aged 27)
- John Frances Dillon (1884–1934), actor and director (aged 49)
- Andreas Dippel (1866–1932), opera singer (aged 65)
- Molly Dodd (1921–1981), actress (aged 59)
- Ted Donaldson (1933–2023), actor (aged 89)
- Frances Drake (1912–2000), actress (aged 87)
- Larry Drake (1949–2016), actor (aged 67)
- Jesse Duffy (1894–1952), screenwriter (aged 58)
- Bobby Dunn (1890–1937), actor and comedian (aged 46)
- Eddie Dunn (1896–1951), actor and director (aged 55)
- Richard Dunn (1936–2010), actor (aged 73)
- Elmer Dyer (1892–1970), cinematographer (aged 78)

== E ==
- B. Reeves Eason (1886–1956), actor, director and screenwriter (aged 69)
- B. Reeves Eason Jr. (1914–1921), actor (aged 6)
- Maude Eburne (1875–1960), actress (aged 85)
- Nelson Eddy (1901–1967), actor and singer (aged 65)
- Robert Edeson (1868–1931), actor (aged 62)
- Walker Edmiston (1925–2007), actor and voice actor (aged 82)
- Lillian Elliott (1874–1959), actress (aged 84)
- Louise Emmons (1861–1935), actress (aged 74)
- Billy Engle (1889–1966), actor (aged 77)
- Skinnay Ennis (1907–1963), musician (aged 56)
- Jeannie Epper (1941-2024), actress and stuntwoman (aged 83) (cremated here)
- Joseph Ermolieff (1889–1962), Russian film producer (aged 72)
- Fred Esmelton (1872–1933), actor (aged 61)
- Alphonse Ethier (1874–1943), actor (aged 68)
- Douglas Evans (1904–1968), actor (aged 64)
- Charles Eyton (1871–1941), former general manager of Paramount Pictures (aged 70)

== F ==
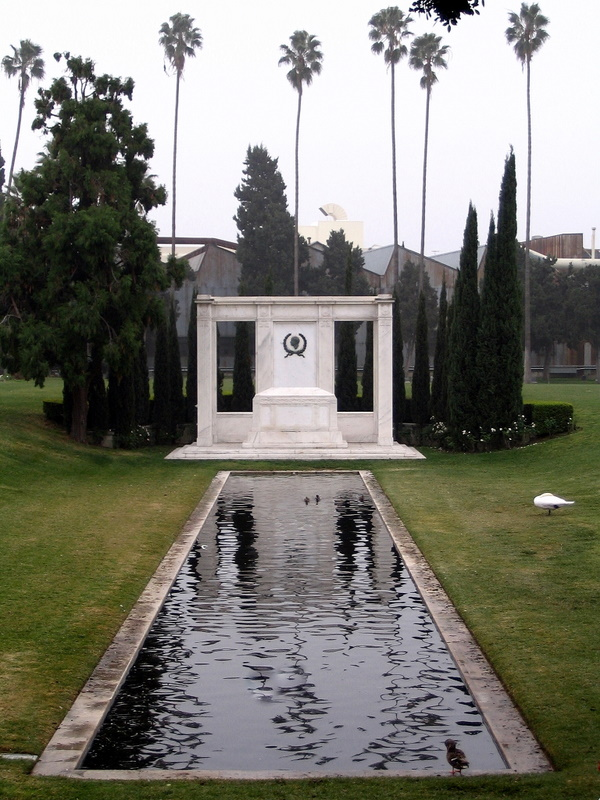
Tomb of Douglas Fairbanks Sr. and Jr.

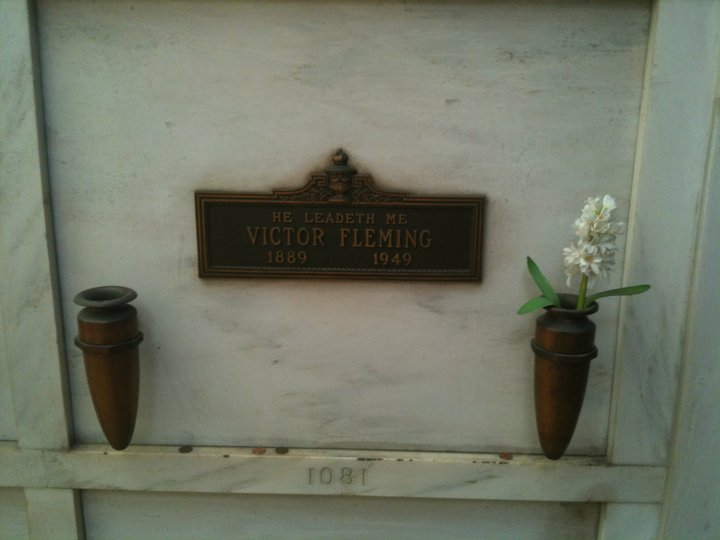
Headstone for director Victor Fleming

- Max Fabian (1891–1969), cinematographer (aged 78)
- Douglas Fairbanks (1883–1939), actor (aged 56)
- Douglas Fairbanks Jr. (1909–2000), actor (aged 90)
- Mabel Fairbanks (1915–2001), figure skater (aged 85)
- Marion Fairfax (1875–1970), screenwriter (aged 94)
- Daniel L. Fapp (1904–1986), cinematographer (aged 82)
- Timothy Farrell (1922–1989), actor (aged 66)
- Julia Faye (1893–1966), actress (aged 73)
- Maude Fealy (1883–1971), actress (aged 88)
- Charles K. Feldman (1904–1968), agent and film producer (aged 64)
- Hugo Felix (1866–1934), composer (aged 68)
- Mark Fenton (1866–1925), actor (aged 58)
- Perry Ferguson (1901–1963), art director (aged 62)
- Flora Finch (1869–1940), actress (aged 71)
- Peter Finch (1916–1977), actor (aged 60)
- Victor Fleming (1889–1949), director, best known for The Wizard of Oz and Gone with the Wind (aged 59)
- Edna Flugrath (1893–1966), actress (aged 73)
- John Taintor Foote (1881–1950), writer (aged 68)
- John Foreman (1925–1992), film producer (aged 67)
- Kim Fowley (1939–2015), singer-songwriter, actor, and music producer/publisher (aged 75)
- Charles Robert Francis (1875–1946), recipient of the United States Marine Corps Medal of Honor (aged 71)
- Sidney Franklin (1893–1972), director (aged 79)
- Kathleen Freeman (1919–2001), actress (aged 82)
- Otto Fries (1887–1938), actor (aged 50)
- Joe Frisco (1889–1958), actor and comedian (aged 69)
- George Froeschel (1891–1979), screenwriter (aged 88)
- Leo Fuchs (1911–1994), actor (aged 83)

== G ==
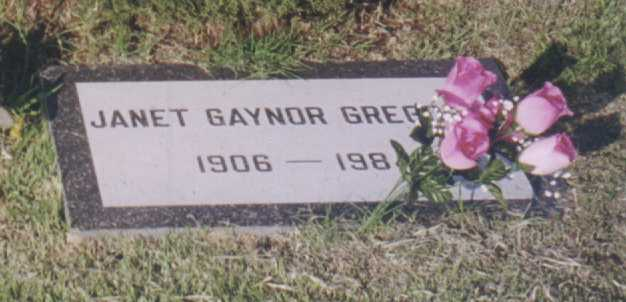
Janet Gaynor headstone

- Victor A. Gangelin (1899–1967), set designer (aged 68)
- Ed Gardner (1901–1963), actor and comedian (aged 62)
- Judy Garland (1922–1969), actress and singer (aged 47) (originally interred at Ferncliff Cemetery in Greenburgh, New York, body exhumed and relocated to Hollywood Forever in 2017)
- Tony Gaudio (1883–1951), cinematographer (aged 67)
- Janet Gaynor (1906–1984), actress (aged 77)
- Gidget Gein (1969–2008), musician, bassist for Marilyn Manson (aged 39)
- Carmelita Geraghty (1901–1966), actress, wife of Carey Wilson (aged 65)
- Estelle Getty (1923–2008), actress and comedian (aged 84)
- Maury Gertsman (1907–1999), cinematographer (aged 92)
- Etienne Girardot (1856–1939), actor (aged 83)
- Irving Glassberg (1906–1958), cinematographer and discovered Clint Eastwood (aged 52)
- Jonathan Gold (1960–2018), Pulitzer Prize-winning food critic and music critic (aged 57)
- Rebecca Spikings-Goldsman (1967–2010), film producer and filmmaker (aged 42)
- Steve Golin (1955–2019), producer (aged 64)
- Leo Gordon (1922–2000), actor and screenwriter; husband of Lynn Cartwright (aged 78)
- Vera Gordon (1886–1948), actress (aged 62)
- Archie Gottler (1896–1959), director, screenwriter, composer and actor (aged 63)
- Griffith J. Griffith (1850–1919), park and observatory donor, namesake of Griffith Park (aged 69)
- Bob Guccione (1930–2010), magazine publisher, founder of Penthouse (aged 79)
- Edmund Gwenn (1877–1959), actor (aged 81) (originally placed in the vaults at Chapel of the Pines Crematory, ashes relocated to Hollywood Forever in 2023)

== H ==
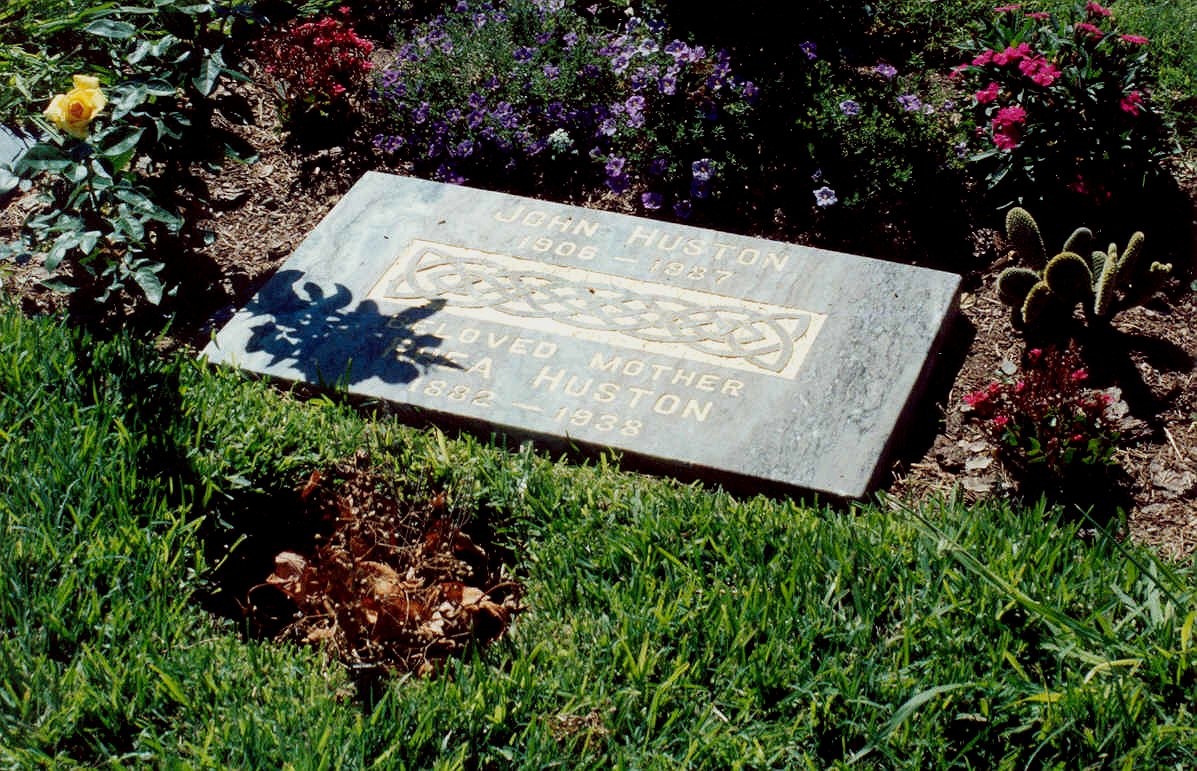
Grave of John Huston

- George Hackathorne (1896–1940), actor (aged 44)
- Joan Hackett (1934–1983), actress (aged 49)
- Bianca Halstead (1965–2001), musician (aged 36)
- Harley Hamilton (1861–1933), musician (aged 72)
- John Hamilton (1887–1958), actor (aged 71)
- Curtis Harrington (1926–2007), director (aged 80)
- Kenneth Harlan (1895–1967), actor (aged 72)
- Valerie Harper (1939–2019), actress (aged 80)
- Mildred Harris (1901–1944), actress (aged 42)
- Henry B. Walthall (1878–1936), actor (aged 58)
- Don C. Harvey (1911–1963), actor (aged 51)
- Jean Havez (1869–1925), songwriter (aged 55)
- Wanda Hawley (1895–1963), actress (aged 68)
- Lennie Hayton (1908–1971), composer, conductor and arranger (aged 63)
- Lillie Hayward (1891–1977), actress and screenwriter (aged 85)
- Anne Heche (1969–2022), actress (aged 53)
- Pauline Pfeiffer Hemingway (1895–1951), wife of Ernest Hemingway (aged 55)
- Woody Herman (1913–1987), musician and clarinetist (aged 74)
- Benjamin Franklin Hilliker (1843–1916), Medal of Honor recipient (aged 73)
- Darla Hood (1931–1979), actress and singer (aged 47)
- David Horsley (1873–1933), built the first Hollywood movie studio (aged 60)
- Jean Howard (1910–2000), actress and photographer (aged 89)
- Rance Howard (1928–2017), actor; father of Ron Howard (aged 89)
- Renate Hoy (1930–2024), actress and beauty queen (aged 93)
- H. Bruce Humberstone (1901–1984), actor and director (aged 82)
- William J. Hunsaker (1855–1933), politician and attorney (aged 77)
- Marsha Hunt (1917–2022), actress (aged 104)
- John Huston (1906–1987), actor, director, and screenwriter (aged 81)
- Halyna Hutchins (1979–2021), cinematographer (aged 42)

== I ==
- Tonya Ingram (1991–2022), poet and disability advocate (aged 31)
- Mihai Iacob (1933–2009), film director and screenwriter (aged 76)
- Bram Inscore (1982–2023), musician and producer (aged 41)

== J ==
- Steve James (1952–1993), actor (aged 41)
- Rick Jason (1923–2000), actor (aged 77)
- Herb Jeffries (1913–2014), singer and actor (aged 100)
- Christopher Jones (1941–2014), actor (aged 72)
- Walter Jurmann (1903–1971), composer (aged 68)
- Fran Jeffries (1937–2016), actress and singer (aged 79)

== K ==
- Olga Kaljakin (1950–2008), film poster designer (aged 57)
- Bronisław Kaper (1902–1983), composer (aged 81)
- Roscoe Karns (1891–1970), actor (aged 78)
- Theodore von Karman (1881–1963), physicist (aged 81)
- Jenny Twitchell Kempton (1835–1921), singer (aged 85)
- Michael Kidd (1915–2007), choreographer (aged 92)
- Udo Kier (1944–2025), actor (aged 81)
- May Kitson (1866–1943), actress (aged 70)
- Skelton Knaggs (1911–1955), actor (aged 43)
- Andrew Koenig (1968–2010), actor and filmmaker (aged 41)
- Walter Koenig (1936–2026), actor (aged 90)
- Zoltan Korda (1895–1961), director (aged 66)
- Erich Wolfgang Korngold (1897–1957), composer (aged 60)
- Kathleen Kirkham (1895–1961), actress (aged 66)
- Bob Kulick (1950–2020), rock guitarist (aged 70)

== L ==
Peter Lorre's crypt

- Harry Lachman (1886–1975), artist, set designer and film director (aged 88)
- Don LaFontaine (1940–2008), voice-over actor (aged 68)
- Arthur Lake (1905–1987), actor (aged 81)
- Barbara La Marr (1896–1926), actress (aged 29)
- David Lander (1947–2020), actor (aged 73)
- Mark Lanegan (1964–2022), singer (aged 57)
- Jesse L. Lasky (1880–1958), pioneer, founded Famous Players–Lasky, which became Paramount Pictures (aged 77)
- Jesse Lasky, Jr. (1910–1988), screenwriter, son of Jesse Lasky (aged 77)
- Barry Latman (1936–2019), baseball player (aged 82)
- Florence Lawrence (1890–1938), actress (aged 48)
- Lillian Lawrence (1868–1926), actress (aged 58)
- Henry Lehrman (1886–1946), director (aged 60)
- Michael Lerner (1941–2023), actor (aged 81)
- Edward LeSaint (1870–1940), actor (aged 69)
- Cathy Lewis (1916–1968), actress (aged 51)
- Elmo Lincoln (1889–1952), actor (aged 63)
- Walter Long (1879–1952), actor (aged 73)
- Perry Lopez (1929–2008), actor (aged 78)
- Lisa Loring (1958–2023), actress (aged 64)
- Peter Lorre (1904–1964), actor (aged 59)
- David Lynch (1946-2025), film director (aged 78)
- Ben Lyon (1901–1979), actor (aged 78)

== M ==
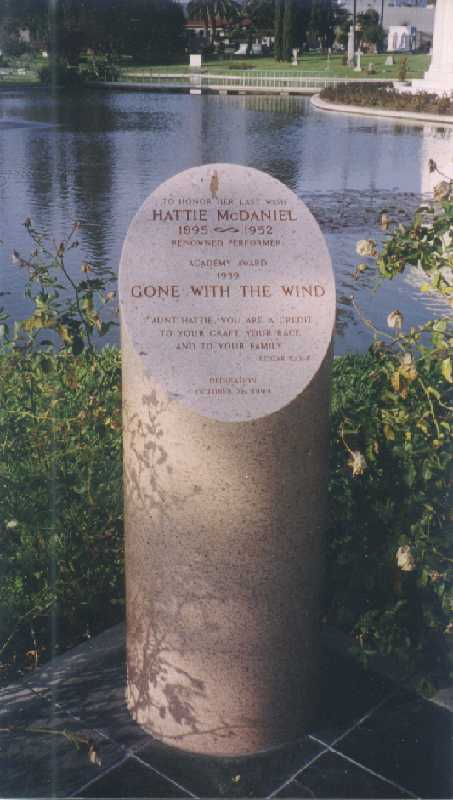
Hattie McDaniel cenotaph

- Robert S. MacAlister (1897–1957), Los Angeles City Council member, (1934–39) (aged 60)
- Jeanie MacPherson (1887–1946), actress and screenwriter (aged 59)
- Richard Maibaum (1909–1991), screenwriter (aged 81)
- Leo D. Maloney (1888–1929), pioneer actor, director and producer (aged 41)
- Paul Malvern (1902–1993), stuntman, actor, and producer (aged 90)
- Jayne Mansfield (1933–1967), actress (Cenotaph; she is buried in Fairview Cemetery in Pen Argyl, Pennsylvania) (aged 34)
- Hank Mann (1888-1971), comic actor of silent films (an original Sennett Keystone Cop, prizefighter vs Charlie Chaplin in “City Lights”), extra in many talkies including many Frank Capra movies) (aged 83)
- Paul Marco (1927–2006), actor (aged 78)
- Peverell Marley (1899–1964), cinematographer (aged 64)
- Tully Marshall (1864–1943), actor, producer and director (aged 78)
- Vivian Marshall (1888–1969), vaudeville performer and silent film actress (aged 81)
- June Mathis (1887–1927), screenwriter (aged 40)
- Hattie McDaniel (1895–1952), actress (Cenotaph; she is buried in Angelus-Rosedale Cemetery) (aged 57)
- Darren McGavin (1922–2006), actor (aged 83)
- Maryland Morne (1900–1935), stage and silent film actress (aged 35)
- Pearl Cole McMullen (1884–1952), soprano (aged 68)
- Adolphe Menjou (1890–1963), actor (aged 73)
- Lou Merrill (1912–1963), actor (aged 51)
- Charles B. Middleton (1874–1949), actor (aged 74)
- Laura Spellman-Middleton (1890–1945), actress (aged 55)
- Ken Miles (1918–1966), sports car racing engineer and driver (aged 47)
- Arthur Charles Miller (1895–1970), cinematographer (aged 75)
- Charles Mintz (1889–1939), animation producer and distributor (aged 50)
- Rhea Mitchell (1890–1957), actress (aged 66)
- Robert Mitchell (1912–2009), organist (aged 96)
- Trevor Moore (1980–2021), comedian (aged 41)
- Paul Muni (1895–1967), actor (aged 71)

== N ==
- Dudley Nichols (1895–1960), screenwriter (aged 64)
- Jack Nitzsche (1937–2000), composer (aged 63)
- Mary Nolan (1902-1948), actress (aged 45)
- Maila Nurmi (1922–2008), actress and television host known as Vampira (aged 85)

== O ==
- Donald Allen Oreck (1930–2006), actor (aged 75)
- Harrison Gray Otis (1837–1917), Los Angeles Times publisher (aged 80)
- Frank Overton (1918–1967), actor (aged 49)
- Seena Owen (1894–1966), actress and screenwriter (aged 71)

== P ==
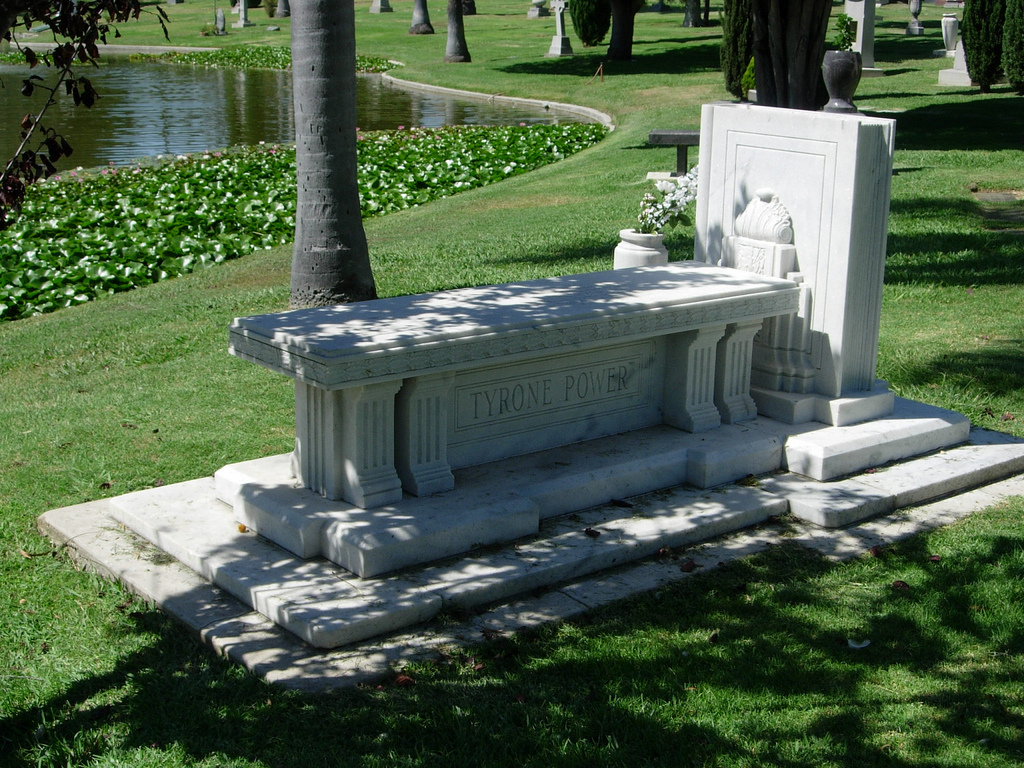
Burial site of Tyrone Power

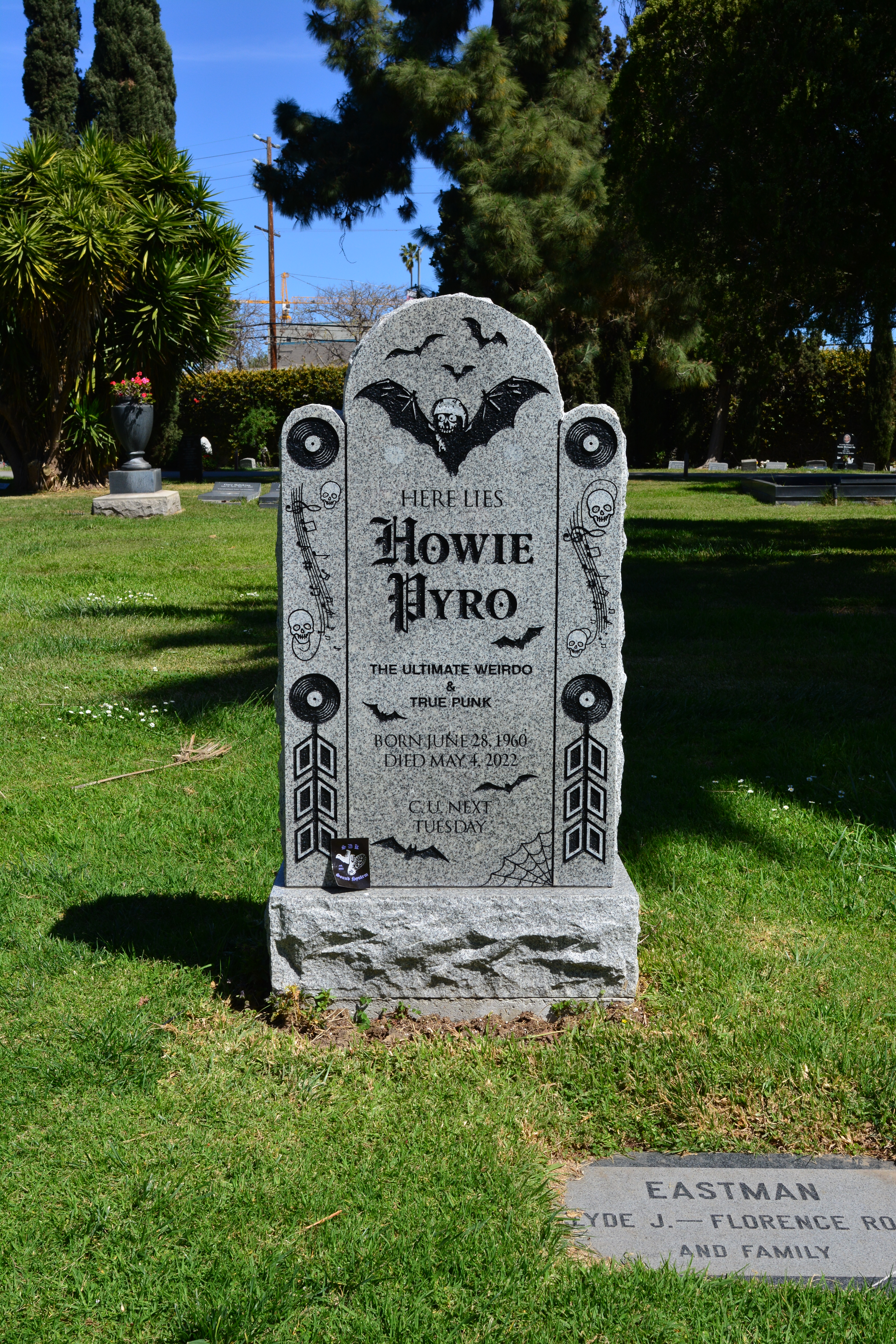
Howie Pyro's grave at Hollywood Forever Cemetery with the epitaph, "Here lies Howie Pyro, the ultimate weirdo and true punk."

- Harlan G. Palmer (1885–1956) judge, publisher of Hollywood Citizen-News (aged 71)
- John Paragon (1954–2021), actor, comedian, writer, director (aged 66)
- Art Pepper (1925–1982), musician, saxophonist (aged 56)
- Barbara Pepper (1915–1969), actress (aged 54)
- Joan Perry (1911–1996), actress (aged 85)
- Tomata du Plenty (1948–2000), singer, founder of the punk band, The Screamers (aged 52)
- Ben Pollack (1903–1971), drummer and bandleader (aged 67)
- Guy Bates Post (1875–1968), actor (aged 92)
- Eleanor Powell (1912–1982), actress and dancer (aged 69)
- Tyrone Power (1914–1958), actor (aged 44)
- Marie Prevost (1896–1937), actress (aged 40)
- Harold Pruett (1969–2002), actor (aged 32)
- Howie Pyro (1960-2022), bassist and founding member of the rock band D Generation
- Madelyn Pugh (1921–2011), co-writer of I Love Lucy (aged 90)

== R ==
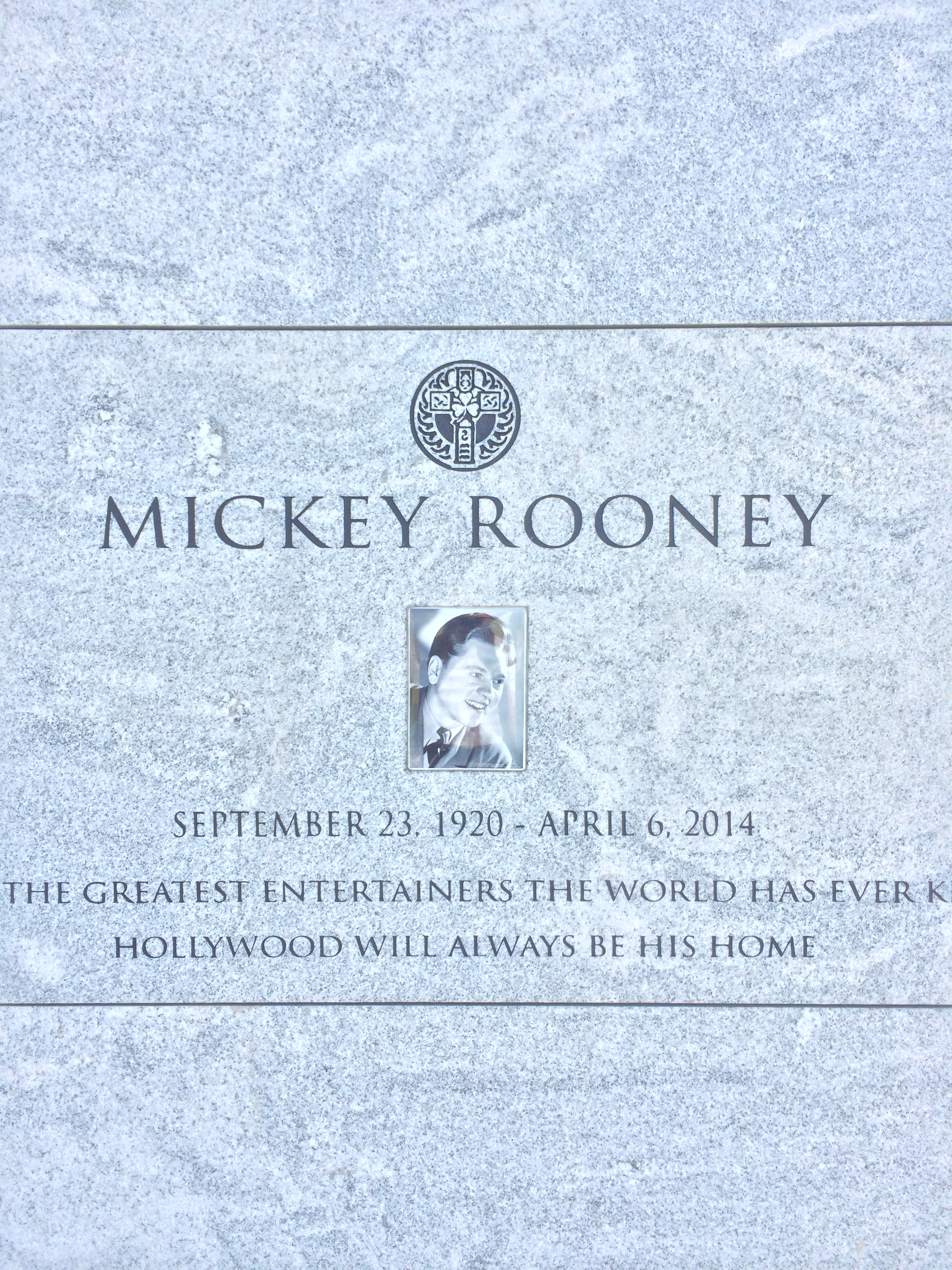
Crypt of Mickey Rooney

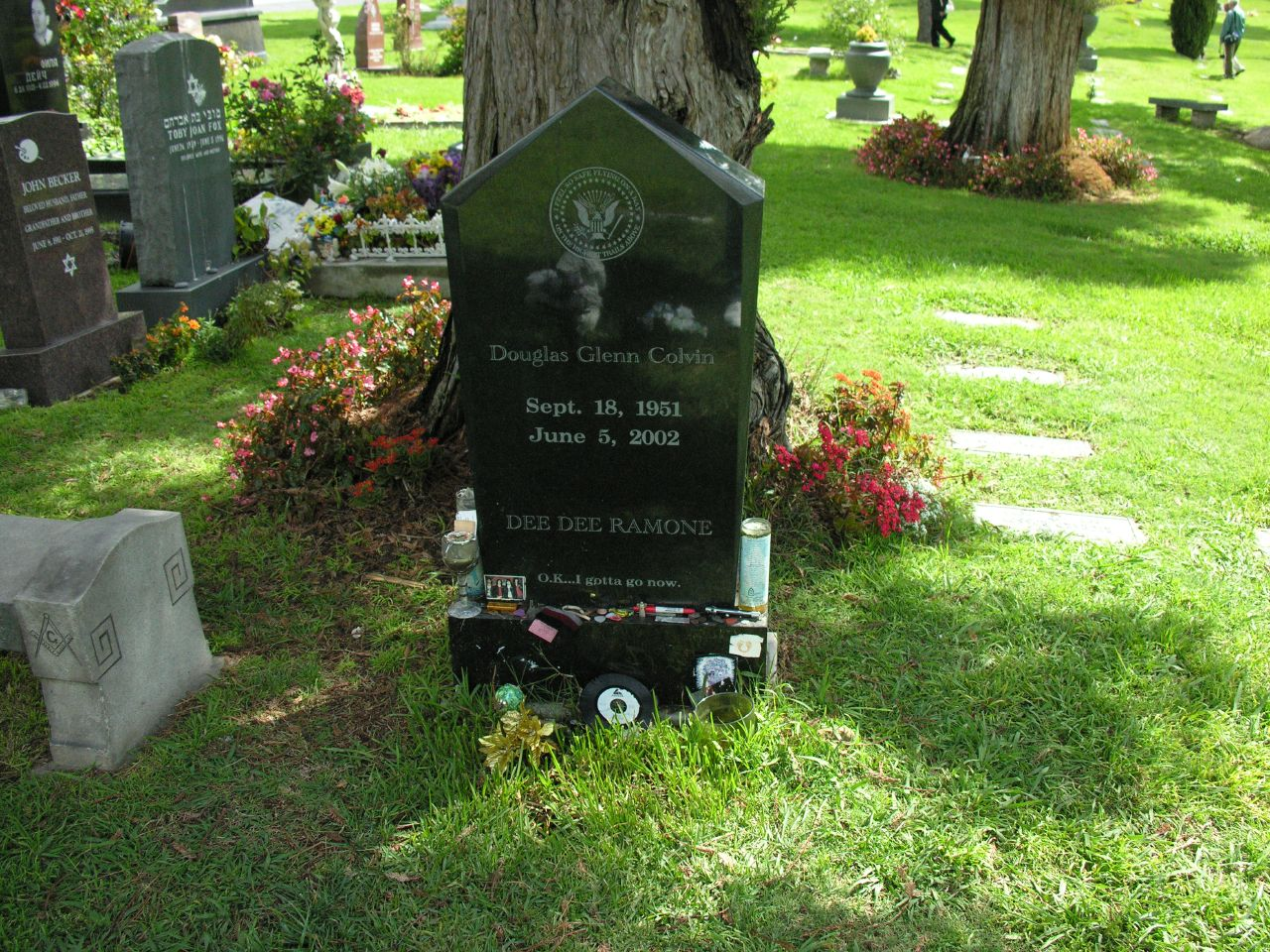
Dee Dee Ramone's gravestone

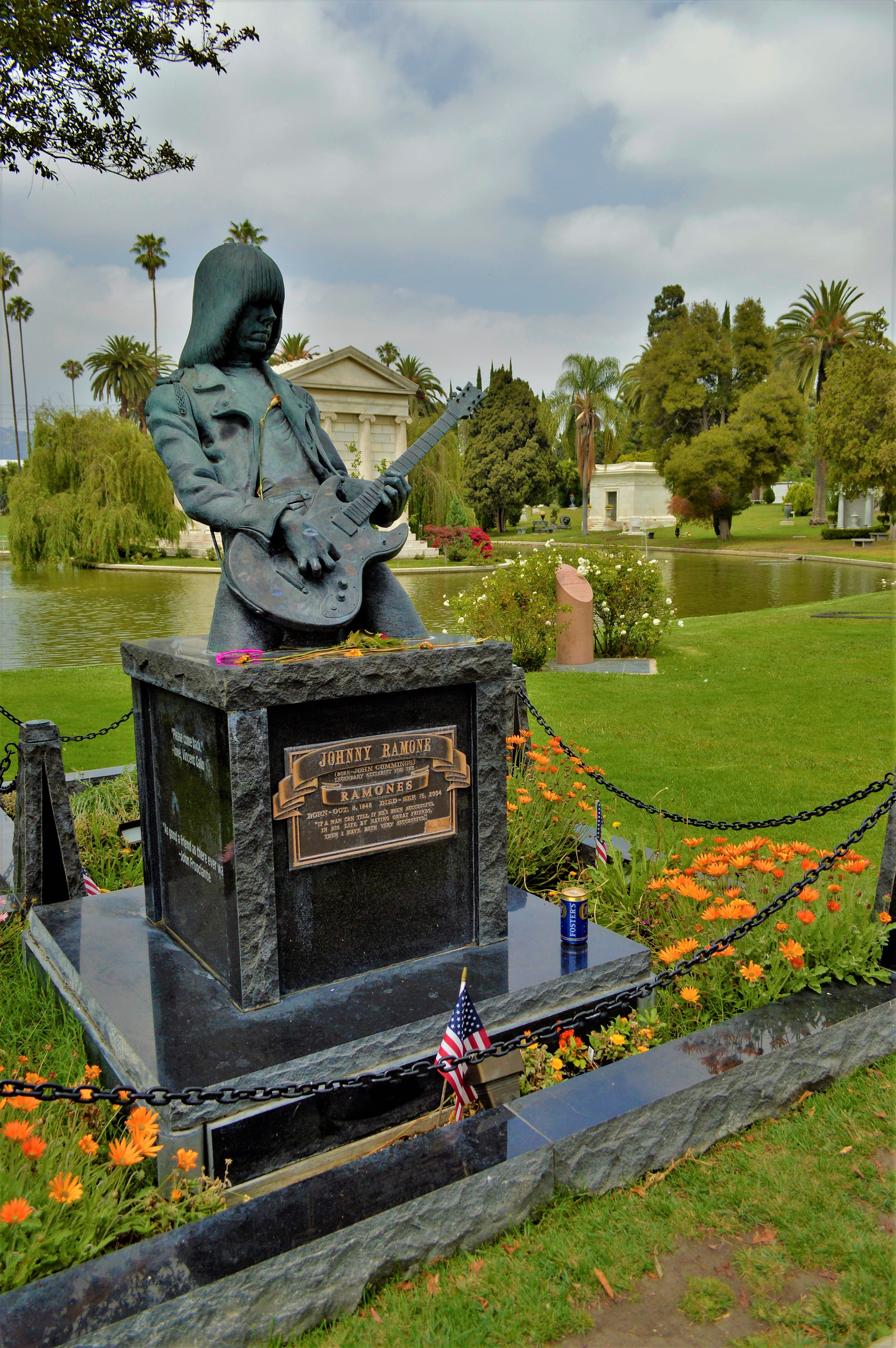
Johnny Ramone's gravestone

- Alan Rachins (1942–2024), actor (aged 82)
- Dee Dee Ramone (1952–2002), musician and member of The Ramones (aged 50)
- Johnny Ramone (1948–2004), musician and member of The Ramones (his ashes were retained by his wife and, after her death, they will both be interred in the Ramone statue) (aged 55)
- Virginia Rappe (1891–1921), actress who died after a party thrown by Roscoe "Fatty" Arbuckle (aged 30)
- Marie Rappold (1879–1957), singer (aged 80)
- Tom Reddin (1916–2004), LAPD police chief (1964–1969) (aged 88)
- Rodd Redwing (1904–1971), actor, and the world's greatest quick draw artist (aged 66)
- George Regas (1890–1940), actor (aged 50)
- Pedro Regas (1897–1974), actor (aged 77)
- Paul Reubens (1952–2023), comedian and actor, best known for Pee-Wee Herman (aged 70)
- Burt Reynolds (1936–2018), actor and filmmaker (aged 82)
- Tom Ricketts (1853–1939), actor and director (aged 86)
- Nelson Riddle (1921–1985), musician and composer (aged 64)
- Dylan Rieder (1988–2016), professional skateboarder (aged 28)
- Al Ritz (1901–1965), actor and comedian; member of Ritz Brothers (aged 64)
- Harry Ritz (1907–1986), actor/comedian, member of Ritz Brothers (aged 78)
- Jimmy Ritz (1904–1985), actor and comedian; member of Ritz Brothers (aged 81)
- Theodore Roberts (1861–1928), actor (aged 67)
- Edward G. Robinson Jr. (1933–1974), actor, son of Edward G. Robinson (aged 40)
- Mickey Rooney (1920–2014), actor and entertainer (aged 93)
- Olga von Root (1901–1967), Russian aristocrat, stage actress, and singer
- Rosa Rosanova (1869–1944), Russian-born stage and film actress (aged 74)
- Arthur Rosson (1886–1960), director (aged 73)
- Harold Rosson (1895–1988), cinematographer (aged 93)
- Richard Rosson (1893–1953), director, actor (aged 60)

== S ==
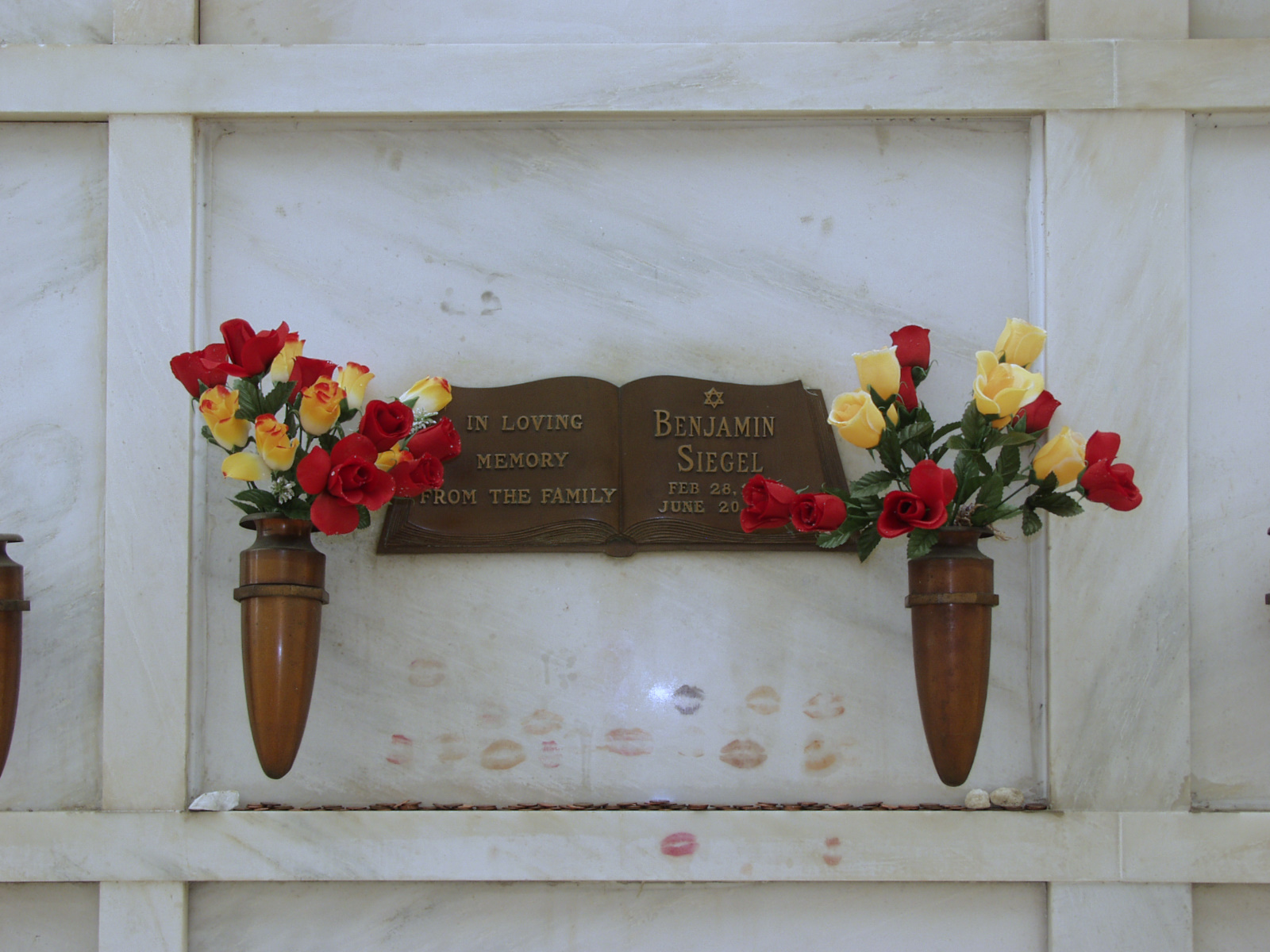
Benjamin "Bugsy" Siegel's crypt

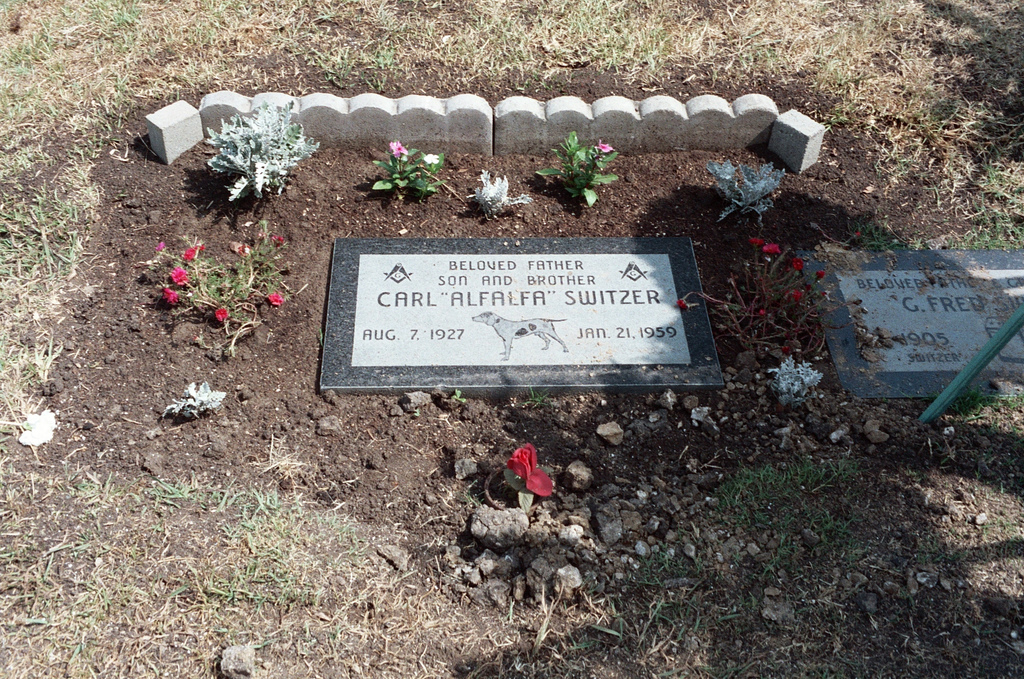
Grave of actor Carl "Alfalfa" Switzer

- Hans J. Salter (1896–1994), composer (aged 98)
- Tom Santschi (1880–1931), actor (aged 50)
- Ann Savage (1921–2008), actress (aged 87)
- Joseph Schildkraut (1896–1964), actor (aged 67)
- Rudolph Schildkraut (1862–1930), actor, father of actor Joseph Schildkraut (aged 68)
- Leon Schlesinger (1884–1949), head of animation at Warner Bros. (aged 65)
- Herman Schopp (1899–1954), cinematographer (aged 55)
- Tony Scott (1944–2012), producer and director; younger brother of Ridley Scott (aged 68)
- Vito Scotti (1918–1996), actor (aged 78)
- Neil Sedaka (1939–2026), musician (aged 86)
- Rolfe Sedan (1896–1982), actor (aged 86)
- Moe Sedway (1894–1952), mobster (aged 57)
- Harry Semels (1887–1946), actor (aged 58)
- Almira Sessions (1888–1974), actress (aged 85)
- Dirk Shafer (1962–2015), model and actor (aged 52)
- Peggy Shannon (1907–1941), actress (aged 34)
- Harold M. Shaw (1877–1926), stage and screen actor, director of silent films in the United States, England, and South Africa (aged 48)
- Barry Shear (1929–1979), producer and director (aged 56)
- Ann Sheridan (1915–1967), actress (aged 51)(originally placed in the vaults at Chapel of the Pines Crematory, ashes relocated to Hollywood Forever in 2005)
- Natasha Shneider (1956–2008), musician and actress (aged 52)
- Bugsy Siegel (1906–1947), gangster (aged 41)
- Jerry Siegel (1914–1996), co-creator of Superman comic books (aged 81)
- Larry Siegel (1925–2019), comedy writer (aged 93)
- Paul Sorvino (1939–2022), actor (aged 83)
- Chief Luther Standing Bear (1868–1939), Sioux Nation actor (aged 70)
- Vsevolod Starosselsky (1875–1953), Russian émigré, former military commander (aged 60)
- Leonid Steele (1921–2014), painter (aged 92-93)
- Ford Sterling (1883–1939), actor (aged 55)
- Stella Stevens (1938–2023), actress, director and model (aged 84)
- Lynn Marie Stewart (1946-2025), actress (aged 78)
- Frank R. Strayer (1891–1964), actor, film writer, director, producer (aged 72)
- Yma Sumac (1922–2008), Peruvian singer and actress (aged 86)
- Josef Swickard (1866–1940), actor (aged 73)
- Carl "Alfalfa" Switzer (1927–1959), actor (aged 31)
- Harold Switzer (1925–1967), actor, older brother of Carl Switzer (aged 42)

== T ==
- Constance Talmadge (1898–1973), actress (aged 75)
- Natalie Talmadge (1896–1969), actress (aged 73)
- Norma Talmadge (1894–1957), actress (aged 63)
- Eva Tanguay (1878–1947), singer (aged 71)
- Estelle Taylor (1894–1958), actress (aged 63)
- William Desmond Taylor (1872–1922), director (aged 49)
- Verree Teasdale (1903–1987), actress (aged 83)
- Judy Tenuta (1949–2022), comedian (aged 72)
- Terry (1933–1945), (cenotaph) dog actress, which played Toto in The Wizard of Oz
- Stacy Title (1964–2021), film director (aged 56)
- Charles E. Toberman (1880–1981), builder of the Hollywood Roosevelt Hotel (aged 101)
- Gregg Toland (1904–1948), cinematographer (aged 44)
- Tamara Toumanova (1919–1996), actress (aged 77)
- Noel Toy (1918–2003), actress and dancer; wife of Carleton Young (aged 84)
- Victor Travers (1884–1948), actor (aged 64)
- Robert Trebor (1953–2025), actor (aged 71)
- Al Treloar (1873–1960), bodybuilder and athletic trainer (aged 86)
- James Troesh (1956–2011), quadriplegic actor and screenwriter (aged 54)
- Mabel Trunnelle (1879–1981), actress (aged 101)
- James Michael Tyler (1962–2021), actor, best known for Friends (aged 59)
- John Tyrrell (1900–1949), actor (aged 48)

== U ==
- Edgar Ulmer (1904–1972), director (aged 68)
- Augusta W. Urquhart (1870-1960), social leader and clubwoman

== V ==
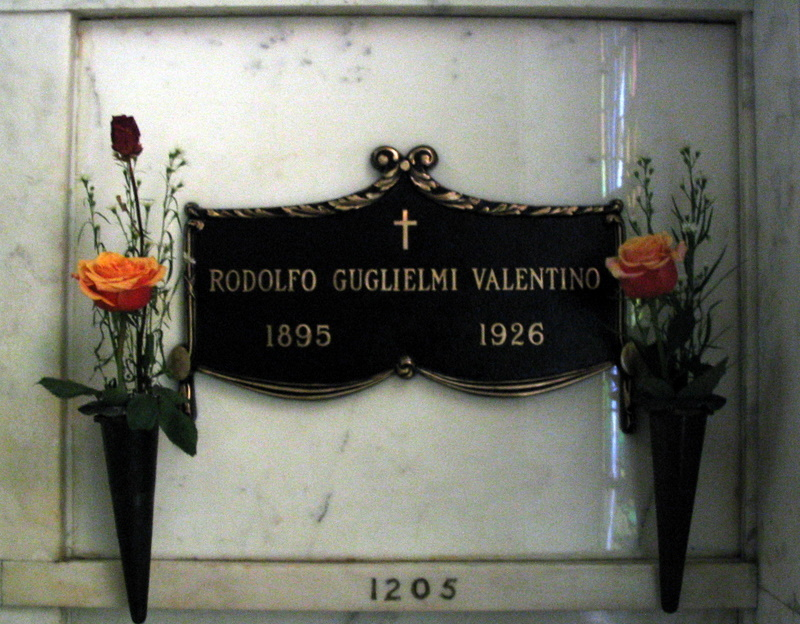
Rudolph Valentino's crypt

- Rudolph Valentino (1895–1926), actor (aged 31)
- James Victor (1939–2016), actor (aged 76)
- Oleg Vidov (1943–2017), actor (aged 73)

== W ==
- George D. Wallace (1917–2005), actor (aged 88)
- Jean Wallace (1923–1990), actress (aged 66)
- Franz Waxman (1906–1967), composer (aged 60)
- Steve Wayne (1920–2004), actor (aged 84)
- Clifton Webb (1889–1966), actor (aged 76)
- Wilson Weddington (1847–1923), early Los Angeles landowner
- Ern Westmore (1904–1967), make-up artist, member of the Westmore makeup family (aged 62)
- David White (1916–1990), actor (aged 74)
- Marjorie White (1904–1935), actress (aged 31)
- Hobart Johnstone Whitley (1847–1931), Named Hollywood while honeymooning with his wife; gravesite is marked "The Father Of Hollywood" (aged 83)
- Harvey Henderson Wilcox (1832–1891), founded the city of Hollywood (aged 58-59)
- Rozz Williams (1963–1998), musician (aged 34)
- Margaret J. Winkler (1895–1990), film executive and animation producer (aged 95)
- Louis Wolheim (1880–1931), actor (aged 50)
- Holly Woodlawn (1946–2015), actress, former Warhol superstar, mentioned in Lou Reed's song, "Walk on the Wild Side" (aged 69)
- Frank E. Woods (1860–1939), screenwriter (aged 79)
- Fay Wray (1907–2004), actress (aged 96)

== Y ==
- Anton Yelchin (1989–2016), actor (aged 27)
- Duke York (1908–1952), actor (aged 43)
- Francine York (1936–2017), actress (aged 80)
- Victor Young (1899–1956), composer (aged 56)

== Z ==
- Erich Zeisl (1905–1959), composer (aged 54)
