= Dark Cloud (actor) =

Canadian actor

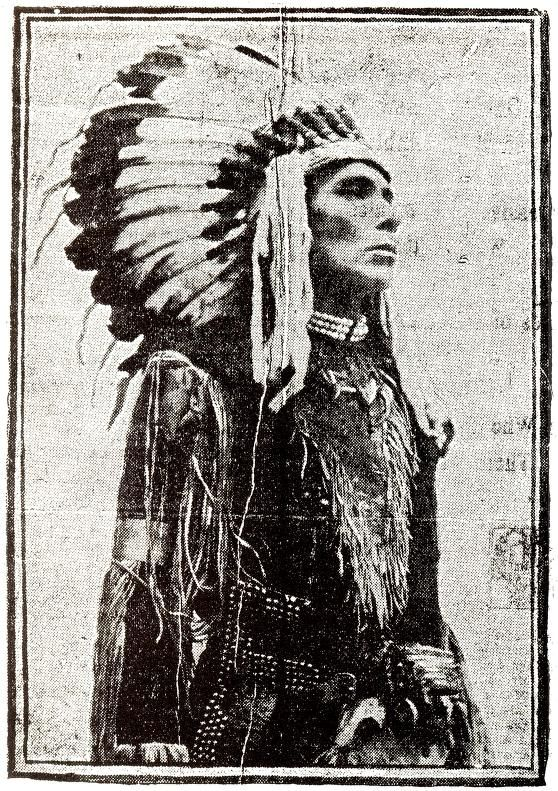
- Dark Cloud, pre-1918, wearing the regalia of Plains Indians.
- Born: Elijah Tahamont; September 20, 1855; Odanak, Quebec, Canada
- Died: September 17, 1918 (aged 62); Los Angeles, California, U.S.
- Resting place: Hollywood Forever Cemetery
- Occupations: Actor, model
- Years active: 1910–1918
- Spouse(s): Margaret Camp (actress, Dove Eye)

Elijah Tahamont (September 20, 1855 – September 17, 1918), also known by the stage name Dark Cloud, was a First Nations silent film actor. He was a chief of the Odanak, a First Nations band government belonging to the Abenaki peoples of northeastern North America.

== Early life ==
Tahamont's father, also named Elijah Tahamont, had studied at Moor's Charity School and Dartmouth College, where Native American education had been funded by a gift of £12,000 in 1767 from a Native American, Presbyterian Rev. Samson Occom. Moor's School had been established for "civilizing the wild, wandering Tribes of Indians in North America, and ... for promoting religion, virtue, and literature among people of all denominations."

Tahamont became known first as a popular lecturer, and as a model for artist Frederic Remington, the most successful Western illustrator in the "Golden Age" of illustration at the end of the 19th century and the beginning of the 20th century. Remington wrote and illustrated a novel, John Ermine of Yellowstone.

== Acting career ==
Dark Cloud began working for American Mutoscope and Biograph in New York City in 1910, making his first screen appearances in the era of "eastern Westerns" under the direction of D. W. Griffith and with cinematography by Billy Bitzer. Unlike the later Westerns, featuring dramatic conflicts and indolent Natives, these early films showed Native Americans with respect: in serene, nearly still-life profile against a wide landscape, as though in calm reflection on their lives before the treaties were broken. The Song of the Wildwood Flute, with Mary Pickford and Mack Sennett, was filmed near Fishkill, New York. Dark Cloud's first movie, The Broken Doll, was made in 1910 in Coytesville, near Fort Lee, New Jersey, where Griffith also filmed Call of the Wild.

Dark Cloud appeared in many Westerns and other films during the 1910s. He moved with Griffith's company to the West Coast in 1912, eventually appearing in at least 34 silent movies in a brief film career of only 8 years, cut short by the Spanish flu pandemic of 1918. He was sometimes billed as Chief Dark Cloud or as William Dark Cloud. After Remington's death, Dark Cloud collaborated on making a 1917 Francis Ford movie, based on John Ermine of Yellowstone, in which "John Darkcloud" appeared as Fire Bear.

Tahamont was dressed as Hollywood's idea of a "Plains Indian Chief" for all his theatrical roles. Being Abenaki (a group of tribes native to Vermont, New Hampshire, Maine, and Southern Canada), he would have never worn the mock ceremonial garb in his personal life, and is often viewed as an example of the long-standing Hollywood tradition of stereotyping and minimizing the cultural diversity of native tribes across the Americas.

== Personal life ==
Tahamont married Margaret Camp, who became an actress billed as Dove Eye of the silent film era. Margaret Camp was born in Indian Lake, New York, the daughter of the town's namesake, Chief Sabael. The Tahamonts' children, Beulah and Bessie, reportedly were "the first Indian children to attend a New York public school". Beulah appeared in early films and on stage. Their granddaughter, Bertha Parker, was an archaeologist and ethnologist. As an ethnologist, she wrote about the lore, mythology, and early history of Native Americans in California and Nevada. Her third marriage was to the actor "Iron Eyes" Cody, a Sicilian man, who played the Indian who sheds a single tear for a blighted American environment in "Keep America Beautiful" ads that ran from 1971 into the 1980s.

Tahamont's death, in Los Angeles, California on September 17, 1918, was from bronchopneumonia, officially attributed to the Spanish influenza pandemic. Rumors that he was murdered by a jealous husband, that he died from accidental drowning, or that he was still alive were never substantiated. Several of his films were released after his death.

== Filmography ==
| Year | Title | Role | Notes |
|---|---|---|---|
| 1913 | An Indian's Loyalty | An Indian | Short, Uncredited |
| 1914 | The Dishonored Medal | Sheik Achmed | |
| 1915 | The Birth of a Nation | General at Appomattox Surrender | Uncredited |
| 1915 | The Penitentes | Indian Chief | |
| 1916 | Intolerance | Ethiopian Chieftain | Uncredited |
| 1917 | The Spirit of '76 | Joseph Brant | |
| 1917 | John Ermine of Yellowstone | Fire Bear | |
| 1919 | A Fight for Love | | |
| 1919 | What Am I Bid? | Himself | |
| 1920 | The Woman Untamed | Witch Doctor | (final film role) |
