= The Mystery Ship =

1917 film

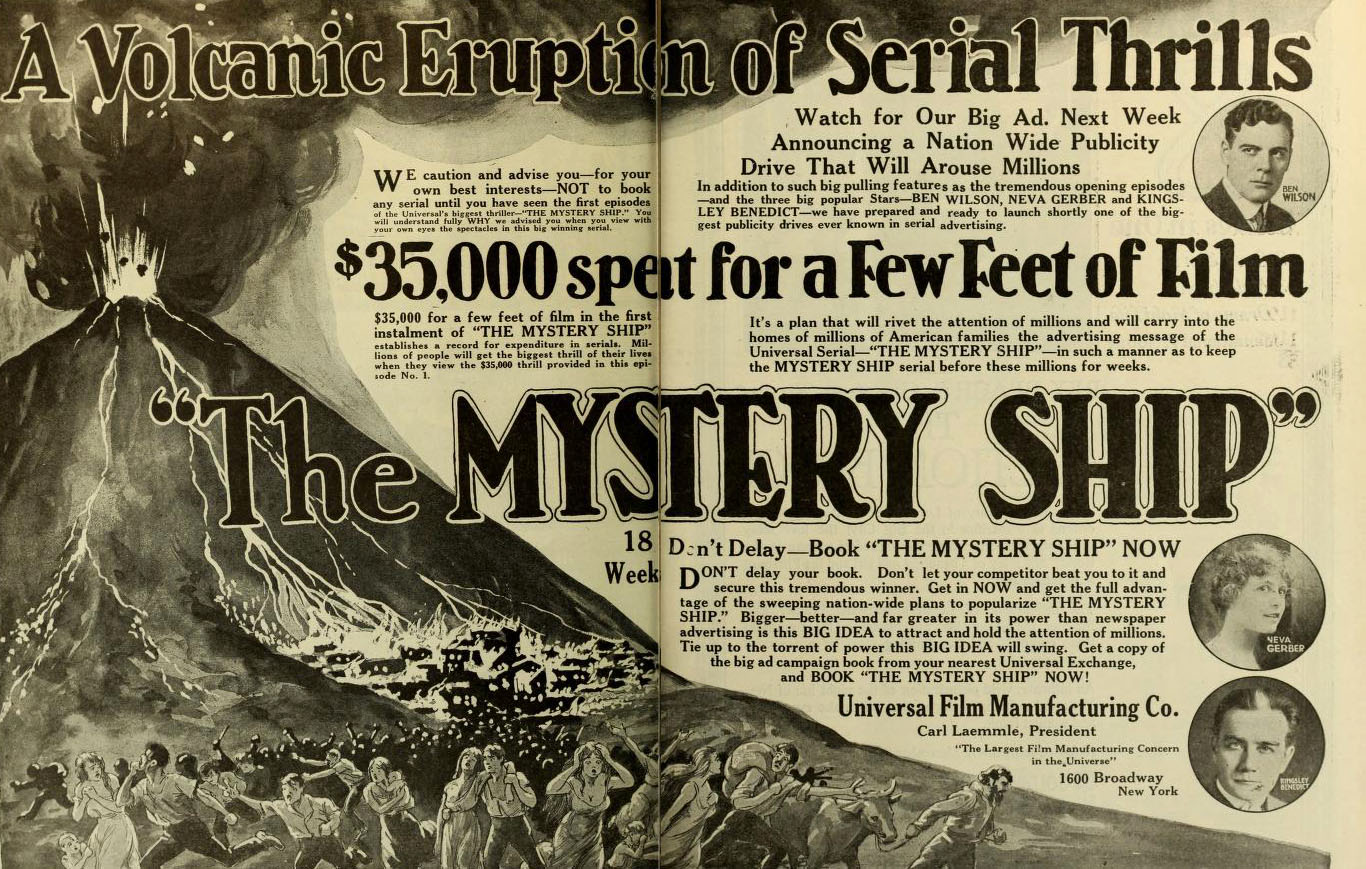
- Film advertisement
- Directed by: Harry Harvey; Henry MacRae
- Written by: William Parker; Blaine Pearson; Elsie Van Name
- Starring: Ben F. Wilson; Neva Gerber
- Distributed by: Universal Film Manufacturing Co.
- Release date: December 1, 1917
- Running time: 360 mins. (18 episodes)
- Country: United States
- Language: Silent (English intertitles)

The Mystery Ship is a 1917 American adventure film serial directed by Harry Harvey and Henry MacRae. The film is considered to be lost.

== Cast ==
- Ben F. Wilson as Miles Gaston
- Neva Gerber as Betty Lee
- Duke Worne as Betty's Fiancé
- Nigel De Brulier as Betty's Father
- Neal Hart
- Harry Archer
- Elsie Jane Wilson
- Philip Ford (credited as Phil Ford)
- Elsie Van Name
- Kingsley Benedict
- Malcolm Blevins
- Francis Ford

== Chapter titles ==
1. The Crescent Scar
2. The Grip of Hate
3. Adrift
4. The Secret of the Tomb
5. The Fire God
6. Treachery
7. One Minute to Live
8. Hidden Hands
9. The Black Masks
10. The Rescue
11. The Line of Death
12. The Rain of Fire
13. The Underground House
14. The Masked Riders
15. The House of Trickery
16. The Forced Marriage
17. The Deadly Torpedo
18. The Fight in Mid-Air

== Reception ==
Like many American films of the time, The Mystery Ship was subject to cuts by city and state film censorship boards. For example, the Chicago Board of Censors required the cut of:

- Chapter 1: three gambling scenes
- Chapter 2: the "slugging" (knocking unconscious) of a man and throwing him overboard
- Chapter 5: the striking a man on the head with a stone, the mob inside a wall shooting a man, and a man falling after the shooting
- Chapter 6: the abduction of a young woman in an automobile and the assault on the male driver
- Chapter 8: the choking of a man on the ship deck by a gangster, two scenes of a man threatening a young woman with gun, a Chinese man threatening a woman with dagger, a Chinese man putting poison on food, two closeup shots of a young woman choking a Chinese woman after she regains consciousness, a distant choking scene, and the last scene in the reel showing a dagger descending towards a young woman
- Chapter 9, Reel 1: three closeup shots of a Chinese man threatening a young woman with dagger, and a man prying a window open to enter a house
- Chapter 9, Reel 2: a man drugging cotton and placing it in a telephone receiver, all scenes of man in a torture chair, five fight scenes, the placing of an unconscious young woman in an automobile, the threatening of a man with a fireplace poker, and the "slugging" of a man at a garden gate
- Chapter 10: the last two torture scenes and the intertitle "You'll never leave us alive"
- Chapter 13, Reel 1: the attack, gagging and binding of a young woman; the entire scene of men shooting at each other from behind barricades of rugs and curtains, including shots of falling men
- Chapter 13, Reel 2: the intertitile "She go die now", the first scene of a Chinese man chaining a young women to a platform, all torture scenes where flames are shown except the one where the young woman is rescued, a gun shooting through an opening in wall, two shots of a Chinese man falling, a man aiming a gun at a prisoner, and the shooting from a trap door
- Chapter 14, Reel 1: the chloroforming of a man by the Man of Mystery, and all but the first and last struggle scenes between a man and a young woman
- Chapter 15, Reel 1: the "slugging" of an agent by a foreign spy
- Chapter 15, Reel 2: the flash flogging scene, three scenes of a man being choked with a rope, all scenes of a man on a young woman's bed after he takes false whiskers off
- Chapter 16, Reel 1: the scene of a young woman and a man in bed, the scene of Gaston pulling the man from the bed, the man covering his face with his hands, the young woman in bed covering her face with her hands, the young woman turning away from the man and burying her face in a pillow
- Chapter 16, Reel 2: the binding of a young woman
- Chapter 17: all but the last holdup scene, the two intertitles "You mean our wife" and "The one that gets the Queen of Hearts—gets the lady", three scenes of police officers being shot at, all shots of men playing cards whilst waiting for a young women to wake up until the time she awakens, three scenes of a gang shooting at police officers, two scenes of men shooting at each other in a cellar, three scenes of a gang shooting at the titular Mystery Ship
- Chapter 18, Reel 2: the shooting from a door and the shooting inside a shed

== See also ==
- List of film serials
- List of film serials by studio
- List of lost films
