= Philip Ford (film director) =

Film director, actor

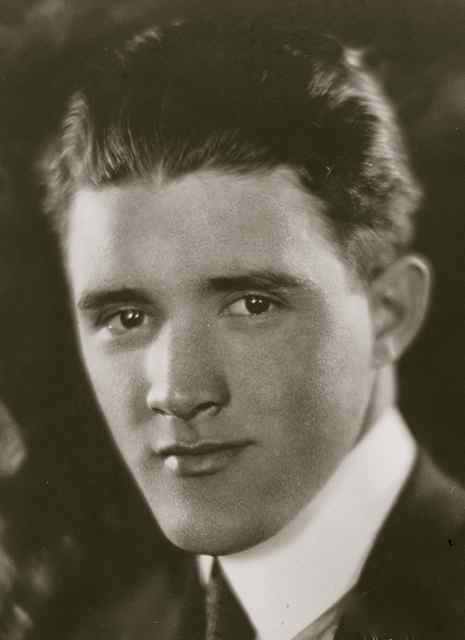
- Photo by Melbourne Spurr
- Born: Philip John Feeney; October 16, 1900; Portland, Maine, U.S.
- Died: January 12, 1976 (aged 75); Los Angeles, California, U.S.
- Occupations: Film director Actor
- Years active: 1916–1964
- Relatives: Francis Ford (father); John Ford (uncle)

Philip John Ford (né Feeney; October 16, 1900 – January 12, 1976) was an American film director and actor. He was the son of actor/director Francis Ford and the nephew of director John Ford, who was only seven years older than him. He was born with the family name Feeney in Portland, Maine, and only later took on the family name of "Ford" after his father and uncle had.

Like his father and his uncle, Philip Ford became active in silent films. As an actor, he appeared 16 in films between 1916 and 1926. He later moved behind the camera in several capacities, eventually becoming a director. He directed more than 40 films between 1945 and 1952, mostly B-movies. Afterwards, he worked as a television director until 1964. He directed 51 episodes of Lassie between 1955 and 1958.

Philip Ford died in Los Angeles, California, in 1976.

== Selected filmography ==
- The Mystery Ship (1917)
- The Silent Mystery (1918)
- The Mystery of 13 (1919)
- The Great Reward (1921)
- According to Hoyle (1922)
- Thundering Hoofs (1922)
- Perils of the Wild (1925)
- Officer 444 (1926)
- The Blue Eagle (1926)
- The Tiger Woman (1945)
- Crime of the Century (1946)
- The Mysterious Mr. Valentine (1946)
- The Inner Circle (1946)
- The Last Crooked Mile (1946)
- The Invisible Informer (1946)
- Train to Alcatraz (1948)
- The Denver Kid (1948)
- Pride of Maryland (1951)
- The Dakota Kid (1951)
