= Mark Fenton =

American actor

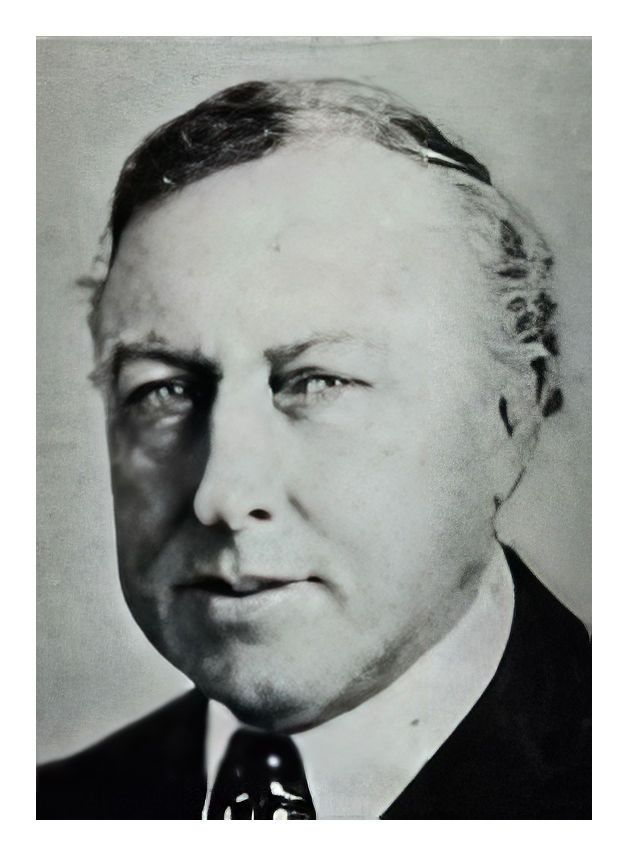
- Born: November 11, 1866; Crestline, Ohio, US
- Died: July 29, 1925 (aged 58); Los Angeles, California, US
- Years active: 1890–1925

Mark Fenton (November 11, 1866 – July 29, 1925) was an American stage performer and motion-picture character actor who appeared in at least 80 films between 1914 and 1925.

Fenton had considerable experience performing on stage prior to acting in silent films. His early stage work included parts in Charles Frohman's productions. His Broadway credits included Twelfth Night (1900), Mary Stuart (1900), Marie Antoinette (1900), The Ladies' Battle (1900), Macbeth (1900), Much Ado About Nothing (1900), and Francesca da Rimini (1901).

A native of Crestline, Ohio, Fenton died in Los Angeles, California in 1925 following his injuries in an automobile accident and surgery to amputate his left leg. His gravesite is at Hollywood Forever Cemetery, which is located along Santa Monica Boulevard in Los Angeles.

== Selected filmography ==
- Graft (1915)
- The Broken Coin (1915)
- The Black Box (1915)
- Guilty (1916)
- Behind the Lines (1916)
- Little Eve Edgarton (1916)
- The Mark of Cain (1916)
- The Adventures of Peg o' the Ring (1916)
- Black Friday (1916)
- Baseball Madness (1917)
- The Flashlight (1917)
- The Man Trap (1917)
- The Phantom's Secret (1917)
- The High Sign (1917)
- The Gates of Doom (1917)
- The Clean-Up (1917)
- Flirting with Death (1917)
- The Clock (1917)
- The Car of Chance (1917)
- John Ermine of the Yellowstone (1917)
- The Man Who Took a Chance (1917)
- My Unmarried Wife (1918)
- The Girl Who Wouldn't Quit (1918)
- The Kaiser, the Beast of Berlin (1918)
- The Mystery of 13 (1919)
- A Fight for Love (1919)
- Behold My Wife! (1920)
- Hitchin' Posts (1920)
- 813 (1920)
- The Fightin' Terror (1920)
- The Prince of Avenue A (1920)
- The Devil to Pay (1920)
- The Wallop (1921)
- Life's Darn Funny (1921)
- The Great Reward (1921)
- Headin' West (1922)
- Little Eva Ascends (1922)
- The Yellow Stain (1922)
- Too Much Business (1922)
- The Village Blacksmith (1922)
- Truxton King (1923)
- Black Lightning (1924)
- American Manners (1924)
- The Battling Fool (1924)
- The Spirit of the USA (1924)
- A Fool's Awakening (1924)
- Brand of Cowardice (1925)
