= Elsie Van Name =

American screenwriter

- Born: Elsie Jane Van Name; 1890; New York, New York
- Died: November 4, 1934 (aged 43–44); Los Angeles, California
- Occupations: Screenwriter, actress
- Spouse: Francis Ford (1909–her death)
- Children: 2

Elsie Jane Van Name (1890 – November 4, 1934) was an American screenwriter and actress active during Hollywood's silent era.

== Biography ==
She was the second wife of actor/director Francis Ford, whom she met when they co-starred in a play together. The pair married in New York City in 1909. They worked together on a number of projects, though their relationship appears to have been rocky.

They separated early on in the marriage (Ford temporarily moved on with actress Grace Cunard), but they got remarried in Los Angeles in 1916. The pair founded Fordart Films in 1917 and released the film Berlin Via American under this banner.

In 1919, while Ford was away on a shoot, Elsie briefly left him for his business manager and sold the studio. She died in Los Angeles on November 4, 1934, and was survived by Ford (to whom she was still married) and their two sons.

== Selected filmography ==
As screenwriter:

- Storm Girl (1922)
- The Great Reward (1921) (serial)
- Crimson Shoals (1919)
- The Mystery of 13 (1919)
- The Silent Mystery (1918) (serial)
- Berlin Via America (1918)
- The Mystery Ship (1918) (serial)

As actress:

- The Mystery of 13 (1919)
- The Silent Mystery (1918) (serial)
- The Mystery Ship (1918) (serial)
- John Ermine of Yellowstone (1917)
