= John Ermine of the Yellowstone =

1917 film

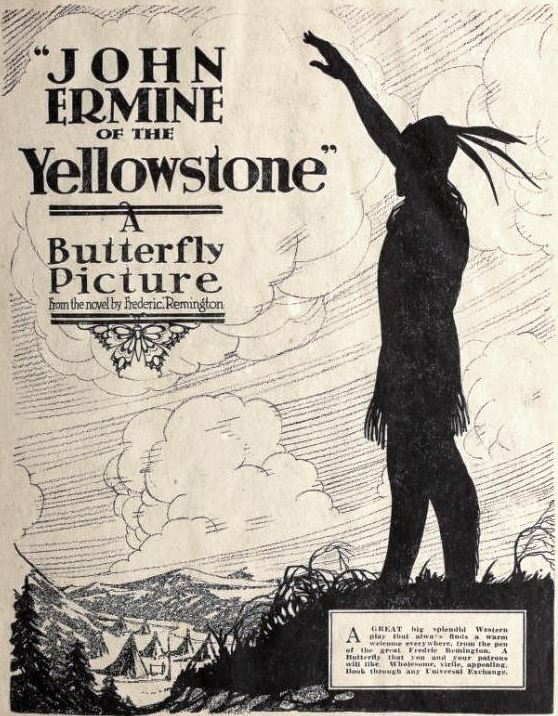
- Directed by: Francis Ford
- Written by: Frederic Remington (novel); Louis Evan Shipman (play); Maud Grange
- Starring: Francis Ford; Mark Fenton; Duke Worne
- Production company: Universal Pictures
- Distributed by: Universal Pictures
- Release date: November 5, 1917
- Running time: 50 minutes
- Country: United States
- Languages: Silent; English intertitles

John Ermine of the Yellowstone is a 1917 American silent Western film directed by and starring Francis Ford. It is based on the novel of the same title by Frederic Remington.

== Cast ==
- Francis Ford as John Ermine
- Mae Gaston as Katherine Searles
- Mark Fenton as Colonel Searles
- Duke Worne as Lieutenant Butler
- Burwell Hamrick as White Seasel
- William A. Carroll as Crooked Bear
- Joseph Flores as Wolf Voice
- Elsie Van Name as Mrs. Searles
- Dark Cloud as Fire Bear
