= The Great Reward =

1921 film

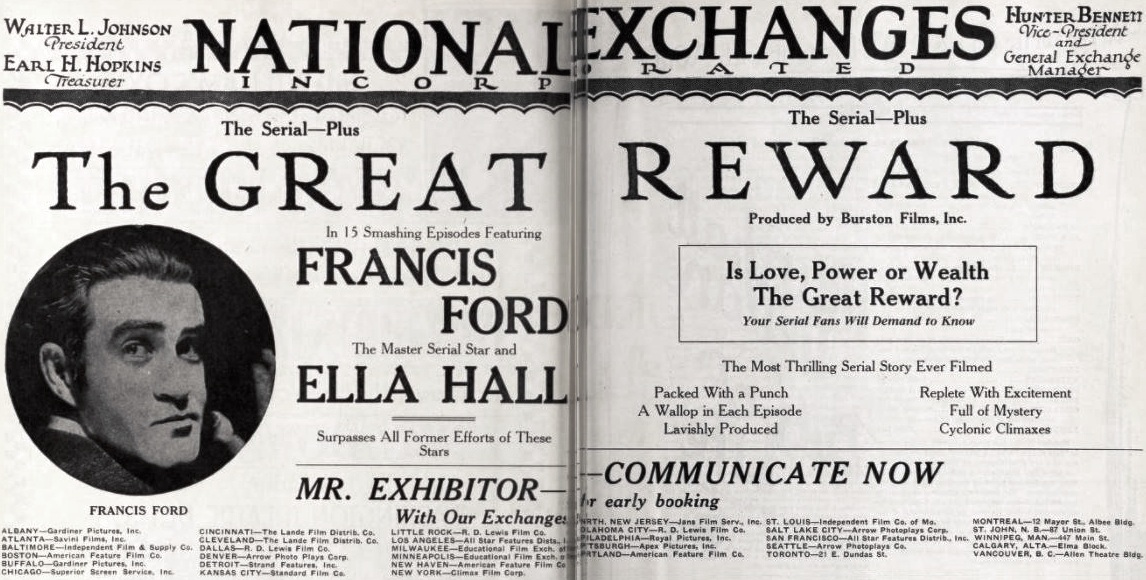
- Advertisement for film
- Directed by: Francis Ford
- Written by: Elsie Van Name
- Produced by: Francis Ford
- Starring: Francis Ford; Ella Hall
- Cinematography: Jerome Ash
- Production company: Burston Films Inc.
- Distributed by: National Exchanges
- Release date: May 9, 1921
- Running time: 15 episodes
- Country: United States
- Language: Silent (English intertitles)

The Great Reward is a 1921 American drama film serial directed by and starring Francis Ford. The film is considered to be lost. The film serial had the working title The Gates of Doom. Philip Ford is the son of director and lead actor Francis Ford.

== Cast ==
- Francis Ford as The American Adventurer
- Ella Hall as The Princess
- Carl Gerard
- Philip Ford (credited as Phil Ford)
- Mark Fenton
- Olive Valerie (credited as Valeria Olivo)

== Chapter titles ==
1. His Living Image
2. The Life Current
3. In Bondage
4. The Duel
5. The Madman
6. Caves of Doom
7. Burning Sands
8. The Thunderbolt
9. Cross Fires
10. Forgotten Halls
11. On the Brink
12. At Bay
13. The Silent Hour
14. High Treason
15. The Reward

== See also ==
- List of film serials
- List of film serials by studio
- List of lost films
