= The Mystery of 13 =

1919 film

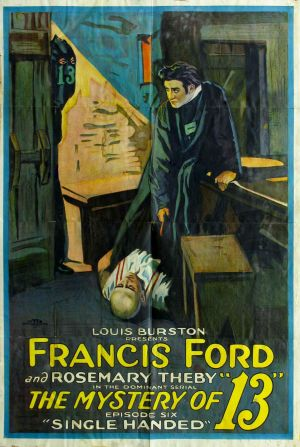
- Film poster Chapter 6 Singled Hand
- Directed by: Francis Ford
- Written by: John B. Clymer; Elsie Van Name
- Starring: Francis Ford; Rosemary Theby
- Production company: Burston Films Inc.
- Release date: August 1919
- Running time: 15 episodes
- Country: United States
- Language: Silent with English intertitles

The Mystery of 13 is a 1919 American drama film serial directed by Francis Ford.

== Cast ==
- Francis Ford as Phil Kelly / Jim Kelly
- Rosemary Theby as Marian Green
- Peter Gerald as Hugo Madiz (as Pete Gerald)
- Mark Fenton as John Green
- Ruth Maurice as Mary Hardon
- Dorris Dare as Rose
- Nigel De Brulier as Raoul Ferrar
- Elsie Van Name as Edith
- Olive Valerie as Ralph (as Valeria Olivo)
- Philip Ford as Butts (as Phil Ford)
- Jack Saville
- Jack Lawton
- V. Orilo

== See also ==
- List of film serials
- List of film serials by studio
