= The Mysterious Mr. Valentine =

1946 film

- Theatrical release poster
- Directed by: Philip Ford
- Screenplay by: Milton Raison
- Produced by: Donald H. Brown
- Starring: William Henry; Linda Stirling; Virginia Christine
- Cinematography: Alfred S. Keller
- Edited by: Richard L. Van Enger
- Music by: Mort Glickman
- Production company: Republic Pictures
- Distributed by: Republic Pictures
- Release date: September 3, 1946 (United States)
- Running time: 56 minutes
- Country: United States
- Language: English

The Mysterious Mr. Valentine is a 1946 American film noir crime film directed by Philip Ford starring William Henry, Linda Stirling and Virginia Christine.

== Plot ==
A young girl gets a flat tire, and ends up with her car being stolen. Later, her car is involved in an accident which results in a man's death. The gangsters who stole the car plant the body in her car to make it look like she was at fault.

== Cast ==
- William Henry as Steve Morgan
- Linda Stirling as Janet Spencer
- Virginia Christine as Lola Carson
- Thomas E. Jackson as Police Lt. Milo Jones (credited as Thomas Jackson)
- Barbara Woodell as Rita Armstrong
- Kenne Duncan as Sam Priestly (credited as Ken Duncan)
- Virginia Brissac as Martha, the Housekeeper
- Lyle Latell as Peter Musso, Henchman
- Ernie Adams as Frank Gary, Henchman
- Tristram Coffin as John Armstrong
- Arthur Space as County Coroner
- Robert Bice as Doctor

== Critical reception ==
Film critic Hal Erickson wrote that the film was "a neat-and-tidy thriller from the Republic B-picture mills."
