= The Silent Mystery =

1918 film

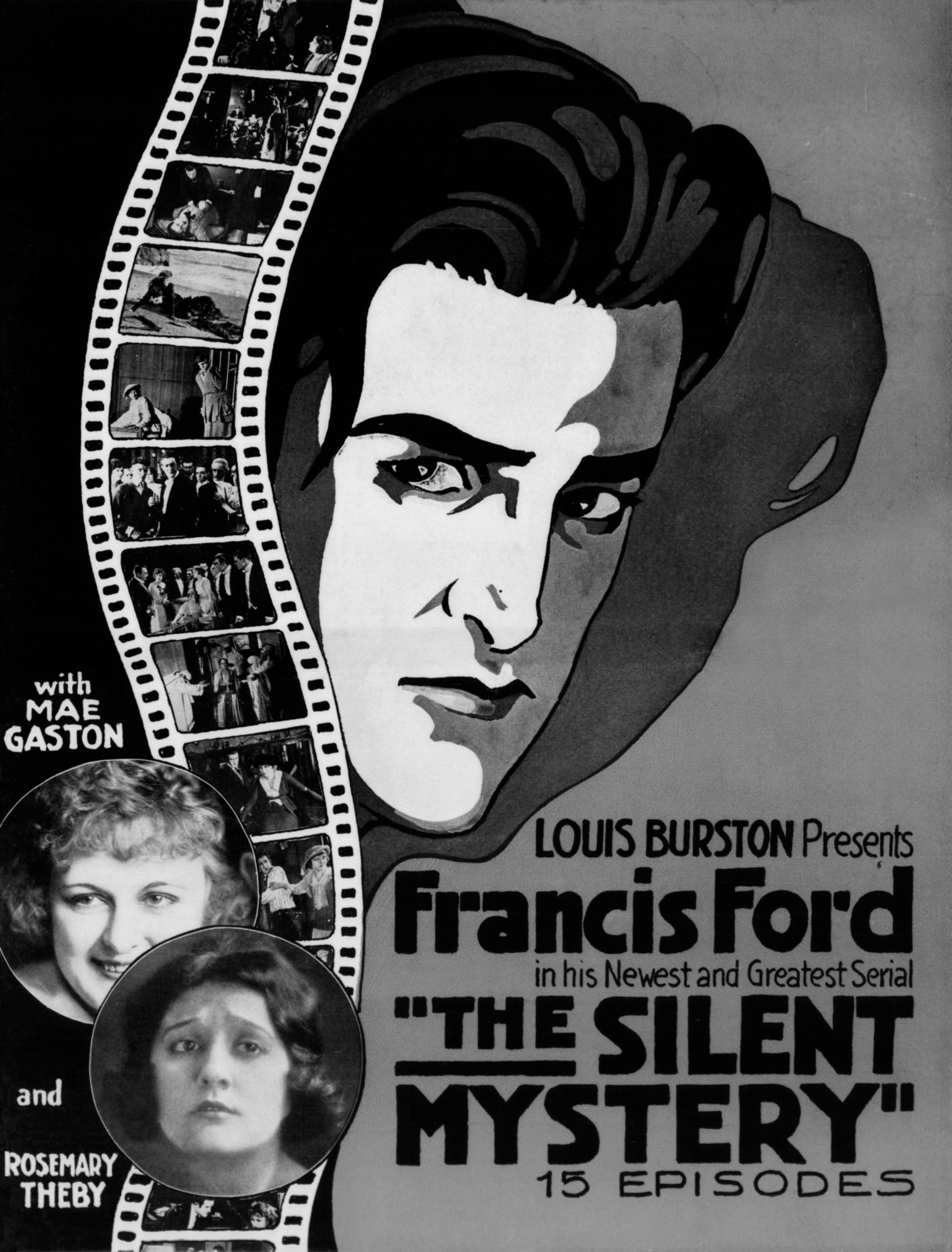
- Press kit cover
- Directed by: Francis Ford
- Written by: Elsie Van Name
- Produced by: Louis Burston
- Starring: Francis Ford; Mae Gaston
- Distributed by: Burston Films
- Release date: November 1918
- Running time: 15 episodes
- Country: United States
- Language: Silent (English intertitles)

The Silent Mystery is a 1918 American drama film serial directed by Francis Ford. The film is considered to be lost.

== Plot ==
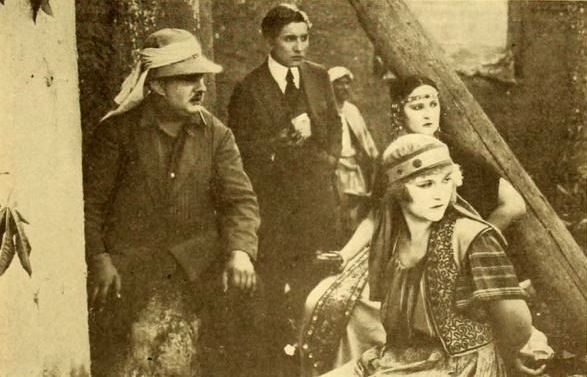
Still with an unidentified actor, Philip Ford, Mae Gaston and Rosemary Theby

As described in a film magazine, Phil Kelly (Ford) devotes himself to solving the mystery surrounding the Graham family. Mrs. Graham (Van Name) has stolen a famous oriental jewel from a mummy in Egypt called the Eye of the World. On her return to the United States, she is followed by Priestess Kah (Theby) and her associates, who are determined to recover the jewel. Betty Graham (Gaston) marries for money to help her father though a financial difficulty. The bridegroom has loaned Mrs. Graham money on the jewel and holds it as security. The night of the wedding he is mysteriously murdered and the body disappears. From this point on, anyone who touches or is connected in any way with the jewel comes under the shadow of the silent mystery and suffers accordingly. Phil has many opportunities to rescue Betty from villeins, and after the Priestess meets Phil, she falls in love with him to complicate matters further. She later obtains the aid of a band of Germans to aid her in obtaining the jewel from its robbers.

== Cast ==
- Francis Ford as Phil Kelly
- Mae Gaston as Betty Graham
- Rosemary Theby as Priestess Kah
- Jerome Ash as Van Berg (credited as Jerry Ash)
- Philip Ford as Chick (as Phil Ford)
- Elsie Van Name as Mrs. John Graham
- Olive Valerie (credited as Valeria Olivo)
- Hap Ward (credited as Hap H. Ward)
- Peter Gerald (credited as Pete Gerald)

== See also ==
- List of film serials
- List of film serials by studio
