= Francis Ford (actor) =

American film actor and director (1881–1953)

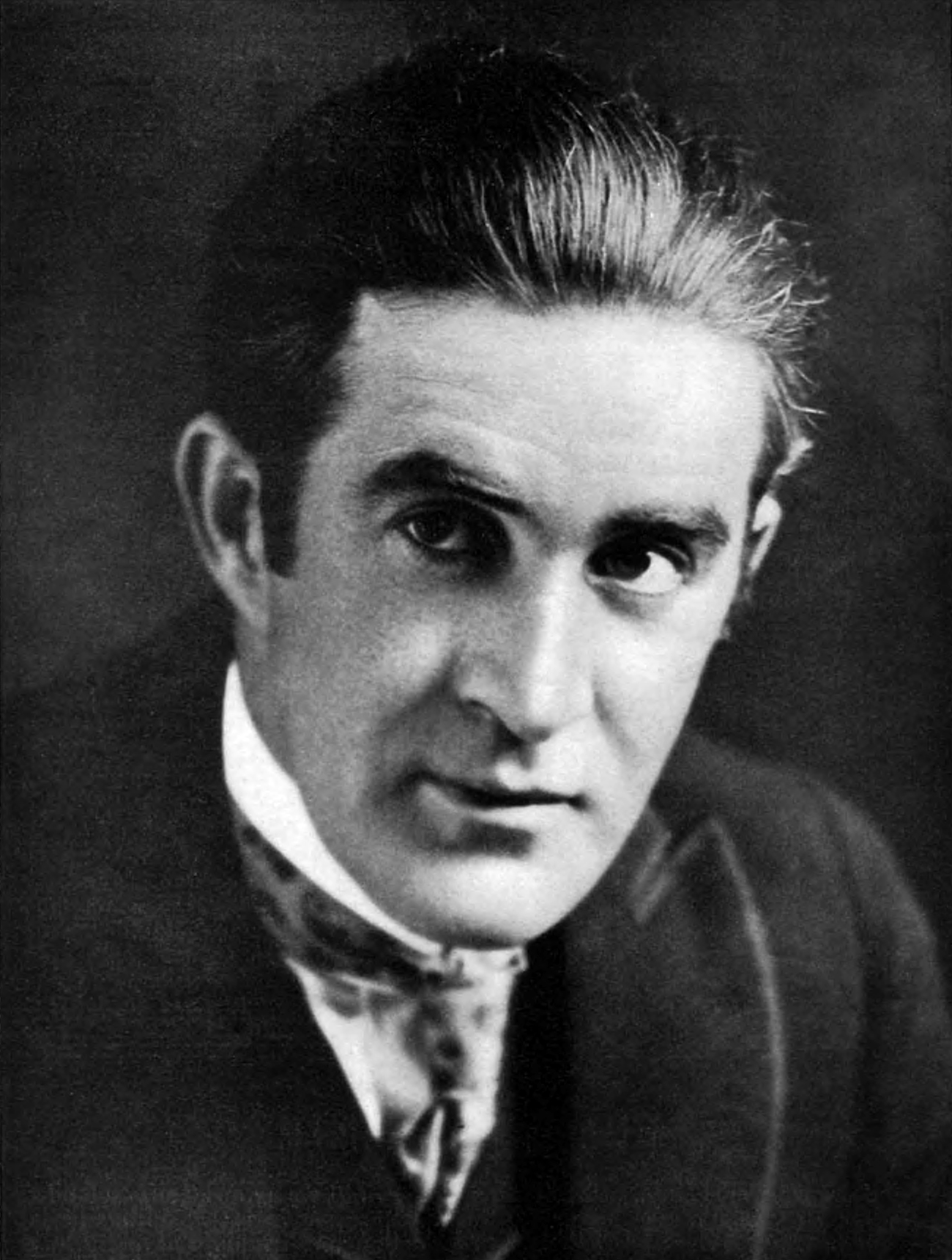
- Ford in 1915
- Born: Francis Joseph Feeney; August 14, 1881; Portland, Maine, U.S.
- Died: September 5, 1953 (aged 72); Los Angeles, California, U.S.
- Other name: J. Francis O'Fearna
- Occupations: Actor; film director; writer
- Years active: 1909–1953
- Spouse(s): Della Cole (1900–unknown) (1 child); Elsie Van Name (1909–1934) (2 children); Mary Armstrong (1935–1953) (his death)
- Children: 3, including Philip Ford

Francis Ford (born Francis Joseph Feeney; August 14, 1881 – September 5, 1953) was an American film actor, writer and director. He was the mentor and elder brother of film director John Ford. As an actor, director and producer, he was one of the first filmmakers in Hollywood.

He also appeared in many of his brother John's movies as a character actor, including The Informer (1935), Young Mr. Lincoln (1939), and The Quiet Man (1952). He gave a memorable performance as one of the men who is lynched in The Ox-Bow Incident.

== Biography ==
He was born Francis Joseph Feeney in Portland, Maine on August 14, 1881, the son of John Augustine Feeney and Barbara "Abbey" Curran. An Irish immigrant, John Feeney was born in the village of Spiddal, County Galway, Ireland, on June 15, 1854. By 1878, John had moved to Portland, Maine, and opened a saloon, at 42 Center Street, that used a false front to pose as grocery store. John opened four others in following years.

Francis Feeney served in the United States Army in the Spanish–American War but was sent home for being underage. Leaving Portland, he drifted into the film business in New York City, working for David Horsley and Al Christie. Moving to Texas, he was part of the Star Film Company's San Antonio operation under Gaston Méliès.

Feeney adopted his stage name "Ford" from the automobile. Moving to Los Angeles from San Antonio, Francis began his Hollywood career working for Thomas H. Ince at Ince's Bison studio, directing and appearing in westerns.

== Work ==
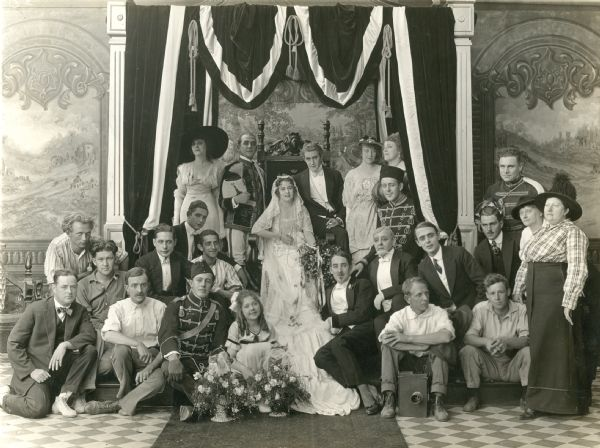
Production still of the cast and crew of the Universal silent serial The Broken Coin (1915). Grace Cunard and Francis Ford are in the center on the throne, the young actress Gertrude Short is seated on the floor in front of Miss Cunard, and John Ford is third from the left. A cameraman, likely Harry McGuire Stanley, is sitting (front right) with a Pathé film camera between his feet.

Ambitious and prolific, in Ford's early work he cast himself as George Armstrong Custer, Sherlock Holmes (with his younger brother as Dr. Watson) and Abraham Lincoln, a role in which he specialized. By 1912, Ford was directing alongside Thomas Ince.

It rapidly became clear that Ince was routinely taking credit for Ford's work, so in 1913, Ford moved over to the Universal Film Manufacturing Co., a movie studio founded by Carl Laemmle the previous year. His 1913 Lucille Love, Girl of Mystery was Universal's first serial, and the first of a string of very popular serials starring Ford's collaborator and lover Grace Cunard. The 1915 serial The Broken Coin was expanded from 15 to 22 episodes by popular demand, and likely represents the height of Ford's career.

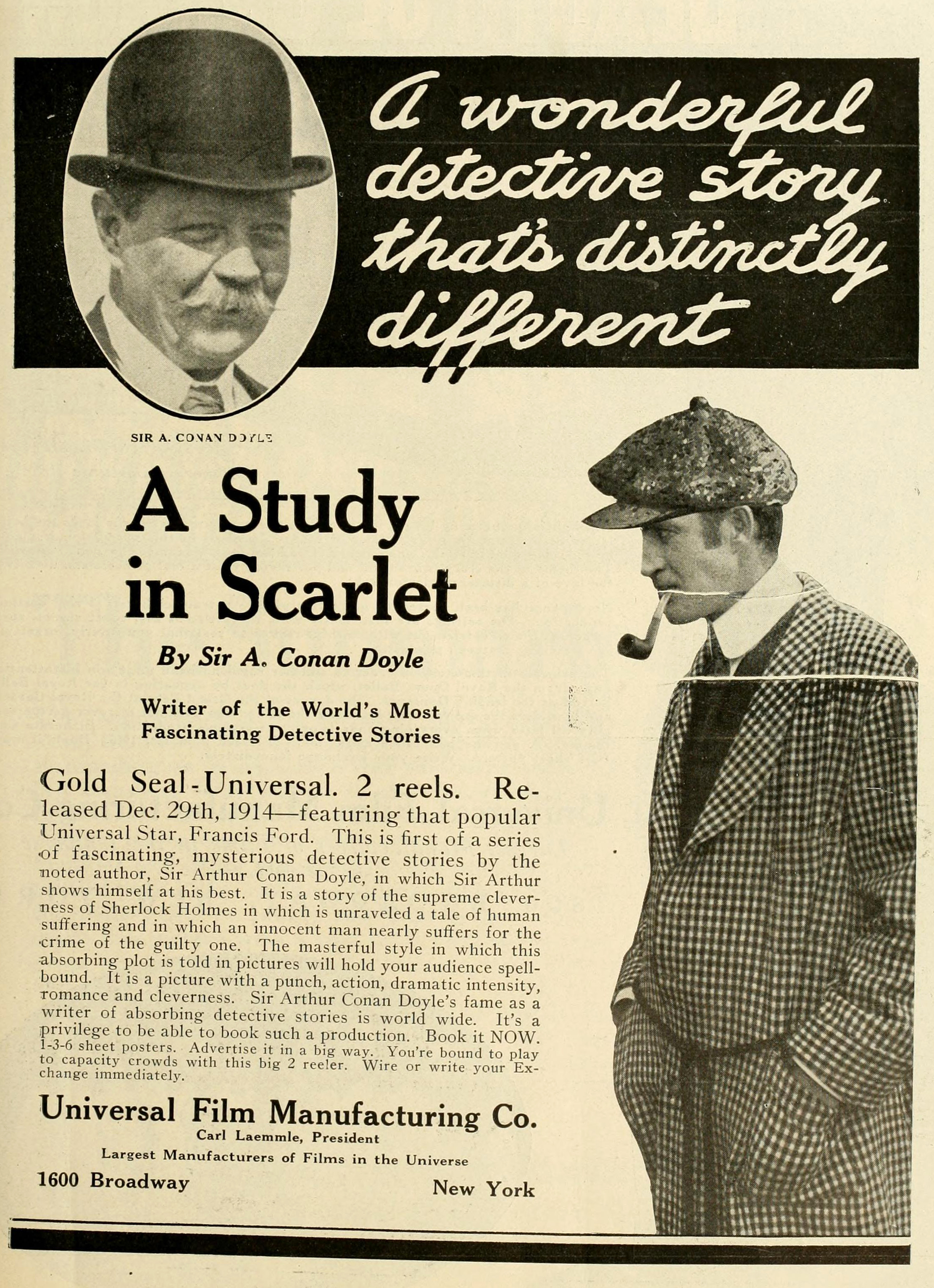
Advertisement for A Study in Scarlet, directed by and starring Francis Ford, 1914

In 1917, Ford founded a short-lived independent company, Fordart Films, which released the 1918 Berlin via America with Phil Kelly, and briefly opened his own studio at Sunset Boulevard and Gower Street. At the same time, Ford mentored his younger brother, collaborating frequently as writers, directors and actors in each other's projects, but as early as 1917, it was clear that John's star was on the rise. Frank's directorial style remained suitable for serials, but failed to evolve. Ford's final known directorial credit is for the 1928 The Call of the Heart, a 50-minute vehicle for "Dynamite the Devil Dog".

Ford may have acted in over 400 films, with many of his early credits poorly documented and probably lost.

== Character Actor ==
From the late 1920s, and for the next two decades, Ford sustained a career as a grizzled character actor and bit player. He is often uncredited, as in his appearance in James Whale's 1931 Frankenstein. Among his most memorable roles was that of the demented old man in The Ox-Bow Incident (1943), for which he also was uncredited.

== Relationship with John Ford ==
Ford's younger brother, John M. Feeney, nicknamed "Bull," was a successful fullback and defensive tackle on a Portland High state championship football team. In 1914, "Bull" followed Francis to Hollywood, changed his name to John Ford, and eventually surpassed his elder brother's considerable reputation.

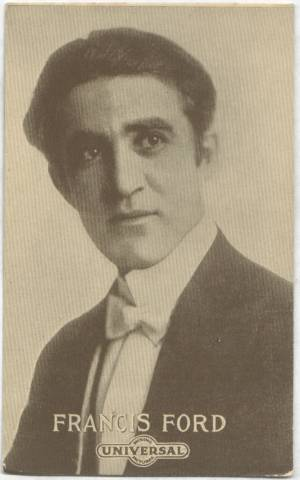
Universal post card, 1915

Ford's son, Philip Ford, was also a film actor/director. Ford died after being diagnosed with cancer.

The Ford brothers were, at the best of times, critical of each other and sometimes sharply antagonistic. Ford wrote an unpublished memoir in 1934 called Up and Down the Ladder which is "filled with bitter and sometimes heartrending complaints about how old-timers who had helped create the industry had been shunted aside by younger men."

When Jack Ford was first in Hollywood working for his brother, Francis had him perform a dangerous stunt where, as his elder brother's stunt double, he ran across a railroad station roof and jumped onto a moving train. At the time he was performing the stunt, the younger brother said to the older that he owed him for the stunt. Many years later, with the power relation reversed, Jack had Francis tied to a hay wagon that was set to be set afire by Native Americans in Drums Along the Mohawk. Before the scene was shot, Jack told his brother, "Now you're paying me, Frank." The hay wagon was set afire, and Jack Ford did not signal to his crew to put out the fire until it reached the leather tongs that bound Francis to the prop wagon.

== Selected filmography ==
- The Immortal Alamo (1911, Short) – Navarre
- The Deserter (actor, 1912, Short) – The Deserter
- Custer's Last Fight (actor and director, 1912) – General George A. Custer
- The Post Telegrapher (director, 1912, Short) – Bob Evans – the Post Telegrapher
- The Invaders (actor and director, 1912) – Colonel James Bryson
- When Lincoln Paid (actor and director, 1913, Short) – Abraham Lincoln
- The Battle of Bull Run (1913) – Abraham Lincoln
- Lucille Love, Girl of Mystery (writer, director and star, 15-episode serial, 1914) – Hugo Loubeque
- The Adventures of Shorty (director, 1914, and some of the subsequent "Shorty" two-reelers through 1917)
- A Study in Scarlet (actor and director, 1914, Short) – Sherlock Holmes
- The Mysterious Rose (1914)
- The Heart of Lincoln (1915) – Abraham Lincoln
- The Heart of Maryland (1915) – Abraham Lincoln
- The Broken Coin (actor and director, 22-episode serial, 1915) – Count Frederick
- Three Bad Men and a Girl (1915)
- The Adventures of Peg o' the Ring (actor and director, 15-episode serial, 1916) – Dr. Lund, Junior
- The Bandit's Wager (director, 1916, Short) – Nan's Brother / The Bandit
- The Purple Mask (1916) – Phil Kelly / The Sphinx
- John Ermine of Yellowstone (director, 1917) – John Ermine
- The Mystery Ship (1917)
- Who Was the Other Man? (1917)
- The Dazzling Miss Davison (actor, 1917)
- Motherhood (actor, 1917)
- John Ermine of the Yellowstone (1917)
- The Greater Woman (actor, 1917)
- The Mirror (actor, 1917)
- The Tornado (writer, 1917)
- The Avenging Trail (director, 1917)
- Berlin via America (director, 1918) – Phil Kelly
- The Craving (writer, director and star, 1918) – Carroll Wayles
- The Silent Mystery (actor and director, 15-episode serial, 1918) – Phil Kelly
- The Isle of Intrigue (1918)
- The Mystery of 13 (actor and director, 15-episode serial, 1919) – Phil Kelly / Jim Kelly
- Crimson Shoals (1919) – Jack Quinn, the son / Frederick Fielding, the father / Thomas Fielding, the grandfather
- The Woman of Mystery (1920)
- Thunderbolt Jack (director, 10-episode serial, 1920)
- A Man from Nowhere (1920) – The Town Drunkard
- The Great Reward (director, producer, star, 15-episode serial, 1921) – The American Adventurer
- Action (actor, 1921) – Soda Water Manning
- The Lady from Longacre (1921) – Count de Freitas
- The Stampede (1921) – Robert Wagner
- Cyclone Bliss (1921)
- So This Is Arizona (1922) – Ned Kendall
- Another Man's Boots (1922) – The Stranger
- Thundering Hoofs (1922) – Daddy Bill / 'Colonel' Bill
- They're Off (1922) – Col. Blake
- Bells of San Juan (1922) – Minor Role (uncredited)
- Storm Girl (1922) – Dr. Blake
- Angel Citizens (1922)
- The Village Blacksmith (actor, 1922) – Asa Martin
- The Boss of Camp 4 (1922) – Dude McCormick
- The Fighting Skipper (actor and director, 15-episode serial, 1923)
- Three Jumps Ahead (actor, 1923) – Ben McLean
- Haunted Valley (actor, 15-episode serial, 1923) – Sharkey
- Mine to Keep (1923) – Jack Deering
- Western Feuds (1924) – J.P. Hartley
- A Rodeo Mixup (1924) – Her Uncle
- Western Yesterdays (1924) – Twitchie
- In the Days of the Covered Wagon (1924)
- Hearts of Oak (actor, 1924)
- The Measure of a Man (1924) – 'Pale' Peter
- The Diamond Bandit (1924) – Friar Aloysius
- Cupid's Rustler (1924)
- Soft Shoes (actor, 1925) – Quig Mundy
- The Sign of the Cactus (1925) – Panhandle George
- A Roaring Adventure (1925) – Colonel Burns / Bennett Hardy
- The Taming of the West (1925) – Frosty Miller
- Scar Hanan (1925) – Jury foreman
- The Power God (serial, 1925) – Government Secret Service Man (Chapter 15) (uncredited)
- Ridin' Thunder (1925) – Frank Douglas
- The Red Rider (1925) – Brown Bear
- Perils of the Wild (director, 15-episode serial, 1925)
- The Fighting Heart (actor, 1925) – Town Fool
- The Four from Nowhere (1925)
- Officer 444 (writer and director, 10-episode serial, 1926) – Fire Chief
- Lash of the Whip (1926) – 'Hurricane' Smith
- Speed Cop (actor, 1926)
- The Winking Idol (director, 10-chapter serial, 1926)
- Wolf's Trail (1927)
- Wolves of the Air (1927)
- Upstream (actor, 1927) – Juggler
- Men of Daring (1927) – Black Roger
- The Devil's Saddle (1927) – Pete Hepburn
- The Heart of Maryland (actor, 1927) – Jefferson Davis
- The Cruise of the Hellion (1927) – Peg-leg
- The Wreck of the Hesperus (actor, 1927) – John Hazzard
- Uncle Tom's Cabin (1927) – Captain (uncredited)
- One Glorious Scrap (1927) – Ralph Curtis
- The Branded Sombrero (1928) – Link Jarvis
- The Trail of '98 (actor, 1928) – Gold Commissioner's Assistant (uncredited)
- The Four-Footed Range (1928) – Brom Hockley
- The Chinatown Mystery (1928) – The Sphinx
- Sisters of Eve (1928) – Pritchard
- The Call of the Heart (director, 1928)
- The Charlatan (1929) – Detective (uncredited)
- The Black Watch (1929) – Maj. MacGregor (uncredited)
- The Lariat Kid (actor, 1929) – Cal Gregg
- The Drake Case (1929) – Juror (uncredited)
- Mister Antonio (1929) – Bit Role (uncredited)
- The Mounted Stranger (1930) – 'Spider' Coy
- The Jade Box (actor, 10-chapter serial, 1930) – Martin Morgan
- Captain of the Guard (1930) – Hussars Officer (uncredited)
- Kathleen Mavourneen (1930) – James, the butler
- Song of the Caballero (1930) – Don Pedro Madero
- Sons of the Saddle (1930) – 'Red' Slade
- Abraham Lincoln (actor, 1930) – Sheridan's Aide (uncredited)
- The Indians Are Coming (1930) – George Woods / Tom Woods
- Resurrection (1931) – Drunken Soldier on Train (uncredited)
- Seas Beneath (1931) – Eric (Captain of Trawler) (uncredited)
- The Front Page (1931) – Carl – a Detective (uncredited)
- A Free Soul (actor, 1931) – Skid Row Drunk (uncredited)
- The Spirit of Notre Dame (1931) – Alumnus (uncredited)
- Possessed (actor, 1931) – Drunken Husband (uncredited)
- Frankenstein (actor, 1931) – Hans (uncredited)
- Battling with Buffalo Bill (serial, 1931) – Jim Rodney
- The Last Ride (actor, 1931) – Brady
- Discarded Lovers (1932) – Medical Examiner (uncredited)
- The Impatient Maiden (1932) - Insane Asylum Warden (uncredited)
- Tangled Fortunes (1932) – Matt Higgins
- Scarface (1932) – Prison Guard (alternative ending) (uncredited)
- Scandal for Sale (1932) – Belmont Hotel Desk Clerk (uncredited)
- Destry Rides Again (actor, 1932) – Judd Ogden
- The Rider of Death Valley (1932) – Gabe
- Heroes of the West (actor, 12-chapter serial, 1932) – Cavalry Captain
- Jungle Mystery (actor, 12-chapter serial, 1932)
- Air Mail (1932) – Passenger Who'll Die on a Train (uncredited)
- The Lost Special (actor, 12-chapter serial, 1932) – Botter Hood
- Clancy of the Mounted (actor, 12-chapter serial, 1933) – Inspector Cabot
- The Thundering Herd (1933) – Frank (uncredited)
- Life in the Raw (1933) – Sheriff Myles
- Pilgrimage (actor, 1933) – Mayor Elmer Briggs
- The Man from Monterey (1933) – Don Pablo Gonzales
- Gordon of Ghost City (actor, 12-chapter serial, 1933) – Mystery Man
- Doctor Bull (1933) – Mr. Herring, Metting Chairman (uncredited)
- Charlie Chan's Greatest Case (actor, 1933) – Captain Hallett
- Roman Scandals (actor, 1933) – Roman Citizen (uncredited)
- Smoky (1933) – Horse Buyer (uncredited)
- Pirate Treasure (1934) – Dick's Friend at the Airfield
- The Lost Patrol (1934) – Arab (uncredited)
- Sleepers East (1934) – Well-Wisher at Train Station (uncredited)
- Cheaters (actor, 1934)
- Murder in Trinidad (actor, 1934) – Davenant
- The World Moves On (1934) – Legionnaire in Trench (uncredited)
- Charlie Chan's Courage (actor, 1934) – Hewitt
- Judge Priest (actor, 1934) – Juror No. 12
- Bachelor of Arts (1934) – Pawnbroker (uncredited)
- The County Chairman (1935) – Cattle Rancher
- The Whole Town's Talking (1935) – Newspaper Reporter at Dock (uncredited)
- Goin' to Town (1935) – Sheriff (uncredited)
- The Informer (1935) – 'Judge' Flynn
- Paris in Spring (actor, 1935) – Drunken Peasant (uncredited)
- The Arizonian (actor, 1935) – Mayor Ed Comstock
- Steamboat Round the Bend (actor, 1935) – Efe
- This Is the Life (1935) – 'Sticky' Jones
- Charlie Chan's Secret (1936) – Captain of Salvage Ship (uncredited)
- Paddy O'Day (actor, 1936) – Tom McGuire – Immigration Officer
- The Prisoner of Shark Island (actor, 1936) – Cpl. O'Toole
- Charlie Chan at the Circus (actor, 1936) – John Gaines
- Gentle Julia (1936) – Tubbs, Fish Peddler
- Educating Father (1936) – Sheriff Hart
- Little Miss Nobody (1936) – Detective (uncredited)
- Sins of Man (actor, 1936) – Town Drunk
- The Plainsman (actor, 1936) – Anderson – Old Veteran (uncredited)
- The Plough and the Stars (1936) – (uncredited)
- A Star Is Born (1937) – William Gregory (uncredited)
- The Road Back (1937) – Street Cleaner (uncredited)
- The Last Train from Madrid (actor, 1937) – Pedro Elias (uncredited)
- Slave Ship (actor, 1937) – Scraps
- The Prisoner of Zenda (actor, 1937) – (scenes deleted)
- Checkers (1937) – Daniel Snodgrass
- Mannequin (1937) – Tim O'Rourke (uncredited)
- In Old Chicago (actor, 1938) – Driver
- Change of Heart (1938) – Dog Pound Man (uncredited)
- The Girl of the Golden West (1938) – Miner (uncredited)
- Kentucky Moonshine (actor, 1938) – Grandpa Hatfield
- The Texans (actor, 1938) – Uncle Dud
- The Great Waltz (actor, 1938)
- Stagecoach (1939) – Sergeant Billy Pickett (uncredited)
- Young Mr. Lincoln (1939) – Sam Boone (uncredited)
- Colorado Sunset (1939) – The Drunk (uncredited)
- Bad Lands (1939) – Charlie Garth
- Drums Along the Mohawk (1939) – Joe Boleo
- Geronimo (1939) – Scout (uncredited)
- The Grapes of Wrath (1940) – Migrant (uncredited)
- The Man from Dakota (1940) – Horseman on Bridge (uncredited)
- Viva Cisco Kid (1940) – Proprietor
- Lucky Cisco Kid (1940) – Court Clerk
- Three Faces West (1940) – Farmer Bill (uncredited)
- South of Pago Pago (actor, 1940) – Foster
- Diamond Frontier (actor, 1940)
- Romance of the Rio Grande (1941) – Stagecoach Driver (uncredited)
- Western Union (1941) – Eastbound Stagecoach Driver (uncredited)
- Tobacco Road (actor, 1941) – Vagabond on Road (uncredited)
- The Last of the Duanes (actor, 1941) – Luke Stevens
- Riders of the Purple Sage (1941) – Inebriated Courtroom Spectator (uncredited)
- They Died with Their Boots On (1941) – Veteran (uncredited)
- The Vanishing Virginian (1942) – Campaign Committee Member (uncredited)
- The Man Who Wouldn't Die (1942) – Caretaker
- The Loves of Edgar Allan Poe (actor, 1942) – Tavern Keeper
- King of the Mounties (serial, 1942) – Zeke Collins (Ch. 4)
- Outlaws of Pine Ridge (actor, 1942) – Bartender
- The Ox-Bow Incident (actor, 1943) – Alva 'Dad' Hardwicke (uncredited)
- Girls in Chains (1943) – Jury Foreman (uncredited)
- The Desperadoes (1943) – Hank (uncredited)
- Jitterbugs (actor, 1943) – Skeptical Old-Timer (uncredited)
- Home in Indiana (1944) – Ed – Seated Opposite J.T. in Bar (uncredited)
- Wilson (1944) – Hughes Campaign Orator (uncredited)
- The Big Noise (actor, 1944) – Train Station Attendant (uncredited)
- The Climax (1944) – Backstage Attendant (uncredited)
- The Princess and the Pirate (1944) – Drunken Pirate (uncredited)
- Bowery Champs (actor, 1944) – Sports Writer (uncredited)
- The Big Bonanza (1944) – Daley (uncredited)
- Mom and Dad (1945) – Dr. Rubin
- Hangover Square (actor, 1945) – Ogilby – Fulham Antique Dealer (uncredited)
- Murder, He Says (1945) – Lee – Old Townsman (uncredited)
- The White Gorilla (1945) – Mr. Stacey
- Wildfire (actor, 1945) – Ezra Mills
- Incendiary Blonde (1945) – Ranch Owner (uncredited)
- State Fair (1945) – R.C. Martin (uncredited)
- Love, Honor and Goodbye (1945) – Old Sea Dog (uncredited)
- San Antonio (1945) – Old Cowboy Greeting Coach (uncredited)
- The Wife of Monte Cristo (1946) – (uncredited)
- Renegades (1946) – Eph (uncredited)
- Sister Kenny (1946) – Patrick O'Shea (uncredited)
- Accomplice (actor, 1946) – King Connors
- My Darling Clementine (1946) – Dad (Old Soldier) (uncredited)
- Wake Up and Dream (1946) – Old Man at Counter (uncredited)
- California (1947) – Jessie (uncredited)
- Gunfighters (1947) – Cook (uncredited)
- High Tide (1947) – Pop Garrow
- Driftwood (actor, 1947) – Abner Green
- Unconquered (1947) – Frontiersman on Fort Pitt Roof (uncredited)
- Bandits of Dark Canyon (1947) – Horse Trader
- Fort Apache (1948) – Fen (Stage Guard) (uncredited)
- The Timber Trail (1948) – Ralph Baker
- Feudin', Fussin' and A-Fightin' (1948) – Race Checker / Fisherman (uncredited)
- Eyes of Texas (actor, 1948) – Thad Cameron
- The Plunderers (actor, 1948) – Barnaby
- 3 Godfathers (1948) – Drunken Old-Timer at Bar (uncredited)
- The Far Frontier (1948) – Alf Sharper
- Frontier Investigator (1949) – Ed Garnett
- She Wore a Yellow Ribbon (1949) – Connelly (Fort Starke Barman) (uncredited)
- San Antone Ambush (1949) – Maj. Farnsworth
- Wagon Master (1950) – Mr. Peachtree
- Father Makes Good (1950) – Fisherman
- The Quiet Man (1952) – Dan Tobin
- Toughest Man in Arizona (1952) – Hanchette
- The Lawless Breed (1953) – Charlie – Saloon Janitor (uncredited)
- The Sun Shines Bright (actor, 1953) – Feeney – Old Backwoodsman
- It Happens Every Thursday (actor, 1953) – Elderly Man (uncredited)
- The Marshal's Daughter (actor, 1953) – Gramps (uncredited) (final film role)

== Television ==
- The Lone Ranger – episode "Gold Fever" – Sam Dingle (1950)
- The Living Bible – TV series – Samaritan Leper (1952)
