= Pearl Cole McMullen =

American singer

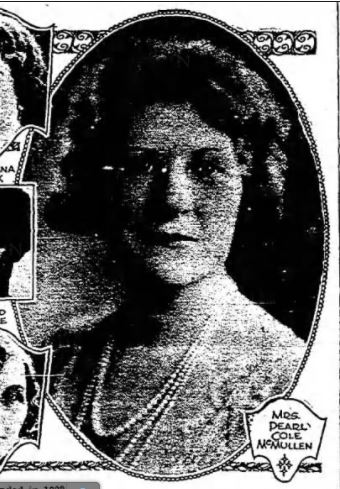

Background information
- Born: January 19, 1884
- Died: May 22, 1952 (aged 68)

Pearl Cole McMullen (January 19, 1884 – May 22, 1952) was the president of the Matinee Musical Club, Los Angeles, and a dramatic soprano.

She was born in Kansas on January 19, 1884. She married Philip W. McMullen. She died in Los Angeles, California, on May 22, 1952. She is buried at Hollywood Forever Cemetery, Los Angeles.

== Career ==
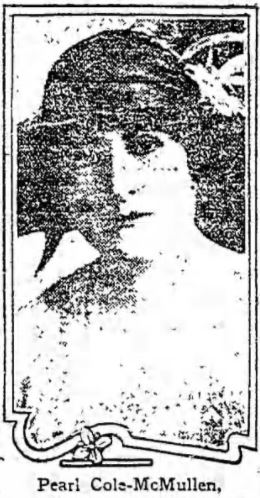
Pearl Cole McMullen, 1923

Pearl Cole McMullen was a dramatic soprano and a teacher of singing; she was available for concerts and recitals. She had a studio at the Majestic Theater Building, Los Angeles.

The Matinee Musical Club, Los Angeles, was founded in 1908 by Lillian Ballagh Farmer. McMullen was the President. The club was the first in the field to pay musicians, particularly young persons just beginning their careers.

McMullen was also the treasurer and federation-extension secretary of the Wa-Wan Club (formerly the Schubert Club), Los Angeles, president (and on the Board of Directors) of the Omaha Woman's Luncheon Club, and chairman of the membership committee of the Los Angeles Music Teachers' Association.

In 1920 McMullen presented a recital before the members of the Ontario Current Events Club, Los Angeles. McMullen sang several operatic selections like "Un bel di vedremo" from Puccini's Madame Butterfly and the Jewel Song from Faust. Her group numbers included song by Kramer, Woodman, Porter, Currant, Saltor, Schubert, Mussorgsky, Ward Stephens and the quaint Chinese Mother Goose Rhymes by Crist.

In the summer of 1921, McMullen did a tour of the East Coast. She went as far as Omaha and Duluth. In Cheyenne, she was the guest of the U.S. Atty and Mrs. C.L. Rigdon. She taught a class for several weeks and gave a program before the Music Study Club. On the way East she appeared in a Berkeley musicale, and gave recitals in Omaha, Hutchinson, Kansas, and elsewhere.

In 1928 McMullen appeared as the Muse Euterpe in the opera The Mistress of Song at the closing function of the Euterpe Club in Los Angeles, of which she was a member.
