= List of American films of 1946 =

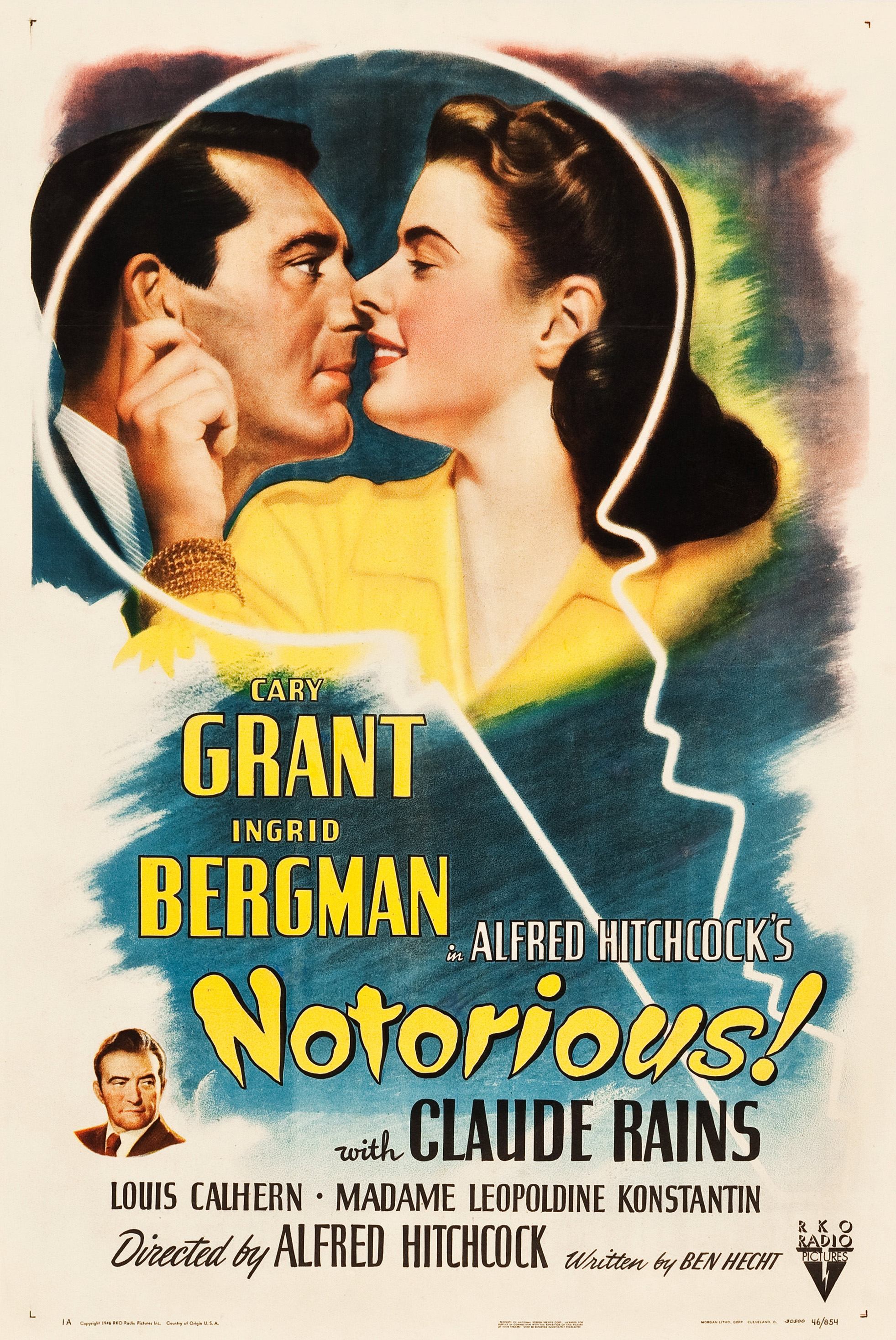
Notorious directed by Alfred Hitchcock.

More than 378 American feature films were released in 1946.

The Best Years of Our Lives won Best Picture at the Academy Awards.

== A ==
Title	Director	Cast	Genre	Notes
Abie's Irish Rose	A. Edward Sutherland	Michael Chekhov, Joanne Dru, J.M. Kerrigan	Comedy	United Artists. Remake of 1928 film
Abilene Town	Edwin L. Marin	Randolph Scott, Ann Dvorak, Rhonda Fleming,	Western	United Artists
Accomplice	Walter Colmes	Richard Arlen, Veda Ann Borg, Tom Dugan	Crime	PRC
Affairs of Geraldine	George Blair	Jane Withers, Jimmy Lydon, Raymond Walburn	Comedy	Republic
Alias Billy the Kid	Thomas Carr	Sunset Carson, Peggy Stewart, Roy Barcroft	Western	Republic
Alias Mr. Twilight	John Sturges	Trudy Marshall, Gigi Perreau, Lloyd Corrigan	Drama	Columbia
Ambush Trail	Harry L. Fraser	Bob Steele, Syd Saylor, Charles King	Western	PRC
Angel on My Shoulder	Archie Mayo	Paul Muni, Anne Baxter, Claude Rains	Fantasy	United Artists
Anna and the King of Siam	John Cromwell	Irene Dunne, Rex Harrison, Linda Darnell	Drama	20th Century Fox
Avalanche	Irving Allen	Bruce Cabot, Roscoe Karns, Helen Mowery	Crime	PRC

== B ==
Title	Director	Cast	Genre	Notes
The Bachelor's Daughters	Andrew L. Stone	Claire Trevor, Gail Russell, Ann Dvorak	Comedy	United Artists
Bad Bascomb	S. Sylvan Simon	Wallace Beery, Margaret O'Brien, Marjorie Main	Western	MGM
Badman's Territory	Tim Whelan	Randolph Scott, Ann Richards, George "Gabby" Hayes	Western	RKO
The Bamboo Blonde	Anthony Mann	Frances Langford, Ralph Edwards, Iris Adrian	Musical	RKO
The Bandit of Sherwood Forest	George Sherman, Henry Levin	Cornel Wilde, Anita Louise, Jill Esmond	Adventure	Columbia
The Beast with Five Fingers	Robert Florey	Robert Alda, Andrea King, Peter Lorre	Horror	Warner Bros.
Beauty and the Bandit	William Nigh	Gilbert Roland, Ramsay Ames, Martin Garralaga	Western	Monogram
Because of Him	Richard Wallace	Deanna Durbin, Charles Laughton, Franchot Tone	Musical	Universal
Bedlam	Mark Robson	Boris Karloff, Anna Lee, Richard Fraser	Horror	RKO
Behind Green Lights	Otto Brower	Carole Landis, William Gargan, Mary Anderson	Drama	20th Century Fox
Behind the Mask	Phil Karlson	Kane Richmond, Barbara Read, Dorothea Kent	Mystery	Monogram
Below the Deadline	William Beaudine	Warren Douglas, Ramsay Ames, Jan Wiley	Drama	Monogram
The Best Years of Our Lives	William Wyler	Fredric March, Myrna Loy, Dana Andrews	Drama	RKO. Academy Award for Best Picture
Betty Co-Ed	Arthur Dreifuss	Jean Porter, Shirley Mills, Jackie Moran	Musical	Columbia
Beware	Bud Pollard	Louis Jordan, Frank H. Wilson, Emory Richardson	Drama	Astor
The Big Sleep	Howard Hawks	Humphrey Bogart, Lauren Bacall, Martha Vickers	Film noir	Warner Bros.
Black Angel	Roy William Neill	Dan Duryea, June Vincent, Peter Lorre	Film noir	Universal
Black Beauty	Max Nosseck	Mona Freeman, Richard Denning, Evelyn Ankers	Family	20th Century Fox
Blonde Alibi	Will Jason	Tom Neal, Martha O'Driscoll, Donald MacBride	Thriller	Universal
Blonde for a Day	Sam Newfield	Hugh Beaumont, Kathryn Adams, Cy Kendall	Crime	PRC
Blondie Knows Best	Abby Berlin	Penny Singleton, Arthur Lake, Steven Geray	Comedy	Columbia
Blondie's Lucky Day	Abby Berlin	Penny Singleton, Arthur Lake, Jonathan Hale	Comedy	Columbia
The Blue Dahlia	George Marshall	Alan Ladd, Veronica Lake, William Bendix, Hugh Beaumont	Film noir	Paramount
Blue Skies	Stuart Heisler	Fred Astaire, Bing Crosby, Joan Caulfield	Musical	Paramount
Border Bandits	Lambert Hillyer	Johnny Mack Brown, Raymond Hatton, Rosa del Rosario	Western	Monogram
Boston Blackie and the Law	D. Ross Lederman	Chester Morris, Trudy Marshall, Constance Dowling	Mystery	Columbia
Bowery Bombshell	Phil Karlson	Leo Gorcey, Huntz Hall, Teala Loring	Comedy	Monogram. The Bowery Boys
A Boy, a Girl and a Dog	Herbert Kline	Sharyn Moffett, Harry Davenport, Lionel Stander	Drama	Film Classics
Boys' Ranch	Roy Rowland	Butch Jenkins, James Craig, Dorothy Patrick	Family	MGM
Breakfast in Hollywood	Harold D. Schuster	Tom Breneman, Bonita Granville, Billie Burke	Comedy	United Artists
The Bride Wore Boots	Irving Pichel	Barbara Stanwyck, Robert Cummings, Diana Lynn	Comedy	Paramount
Bringing Up Father	Edward F. Cline	Joe Yule, Renie Riano, Tim Ryan	Comedy	Monogram
The Brute Man	Jean Yarbrough	Rondo Hatton, Jan Wiley, Tom Neal	Horror	Universal

== C ==
Title	Director	Cast	Genre	Notes
California Gold Rush	R. G. Springsteen	Wild Bill Elliott, Peggy Stewart, Robert Blake	Western	Republic
Canyon Passage	Jacques Tourneur	Dana Andrews, Brian Donlevy, Susan Hayward	Western	Universal
The Caravan Trail	Robert Emmett Tansey	Eddie Dean, Lash La Rue, Jean Carlin	Western	PRC
The Cat Creeps	Erle C. Kenton	Noah Beery Jr., Lois Collier, Paul Kelly	Thriller	Universal
The Catman of Paris	Lesley Selander	Carl Esmond, Lenore Aubert, Adele Mara	Horror	Republic
Centennial Summer	Otto Preminger	Jeanne Crain, Cornel Wilde, Linda Darnell	Musical	20th Century Fox
The Chase	Arthur Ripley	Robert Cummings, Michèle Morgan, Steve Cochran	Film noir	United Artists
Child of Divorce	Richard Fleischer	Sharyn Moffett, Regis Toomey, Madge Meredith	Drama	RKO
Cinderella Jones	Busby Berkeley	Joan Leslie, Robert Alda, Julie Bishop	Musical	Warner Bros.
Claudia and David	Walter Lang	Dorothy McGuire, Robert Young, Mary Astor	Drama	Fox
Cloak and Dagger	Fritz Lang	Gary Cooper, Lilli Palmer, Robert Alda	Thriller	Warner Bros.
A Close Call for Boston Blackie	Lew Landers	Chester Morris, Lynn Merrick, Richard Lane	Mystery	Columbia
Cluny Brown	Ernst Lubitsch	Charles Boyer, Jennifer Jones, Peter Lawford	Comedy	20th Century Fox
The Cockeyed Miracle	S. Sylvan Simon	Audrey Totter, Cecil Kellaway, Frank Morgan	Fantasy	MGM
Colonel Effingham's Raid	Irving Pichel	Charles Coburn, Joan Bennett, William Eythe	Comedy	20th Century Fox
Colorado Serenade	Robert Emmett Tansey	Eddie Dean, Roscoe Ates, Forrest Taylor	Western	PRC
Conquest of Cheyenne	R. G. Springsteen	Wild Bill Elliott, Peggy Stewart, Alice Fleming	Western	Republic
Courage of Lassie	Fred M. Wilcox	Elizabeth Taylor, Catherine McLeod, Frank Morgan	Family	MGM
Cowboy Blues	Ray Nazarro	Ken Curtis, Jeff Donnell, Guy Kibbee	Western	Columbia
Crack-Up	Irving Reis	Pat O'Brien, Claire Trevor, Herbert Marshall	Film noir	RKO
Crime Doctor's Man Hunt	William Castle	Warner Baxter, Ellen Drew, William Frawley	Mystery	Columbia. Part of Crime Doctor series
Crime of the Century	Philip Ford	Stephanie Bachelor, Martin Kosleck, Ray Walker	Crime	Republic
Criminal Court	Robert Wise	Martha O'Driscoll, Tom Conway, June Clayworth	Crime	RKO
Cross My Heart	John Berry	Betty Hutton, Sonny Tufts, Ruth Donnelly	Comedy	Paramount
Cuban Pete	Jean Yarbrough	Desi Arnaz, Joan Fulton, Don Porter	Musical	Universal

== D ==
Title	Director	Cast	Genre	Notes
Danger Woman	Lewis D. Collins	Don Porter, Brenda Joyce, Patricia Morison	Film noir	Universal
Dangerous Business	D. Ross Lederman	Forrest Tucker, Lynn Merrick, Gerald Mohr	Comedy	Columbia
Dangerous Millions	James Tinling	Kent Taylor, Dona Drake, Tala Birell	Drama	20th Century Fox
Dangerous Money	Terry O. Morse	Sidney Toler, Gloria Warren, Victor Sen Yung	Mystery	Monogram. Charlie Chan
Danny Boy	Terry O. Morse	Charles Bates, Ace the Wonder Dog, Ralph Lewis	Drama	PRC
Dark Alibi	Phil Karlson	Sidney Toler, Mantan Moreland, Teala Loring	Mystery	Monogram. Charlie Chan
The Dark Corner	Henry Hathaway	Lucille Ball, Clifton Webb, William Bendix	Film noir	20th Century Fox
The Dark Horse	Will Jason	Phillip Terry, Ann Savage, Allen Jenkins	Drama	Universal
The Dark Mirror	Robert Siodmak	Olivia de Havilland, Lew Ayres, Thomas Mitchell	Horror	Universal
Days of Buffalo Bill	Thomas Carr	Sunset Carson, Peggy Stewart, Tom London	Western	Republic
Deadline at Dawn	Harold Clurman	Susan Hayward, Paul Lukas, Bill Williams	Film noir	RKO
Deadline for Murder	James Tinling	Paul Kelly, Kent Taylor, Sheila Ryan	Crime	20th Century Fox
Death Valley	Lew Landers	Robert Lowery, Nat Pendleton, Barbara Read	Western	Lippert
Deception	Irving Rapper	Bette Davis, Paul Henreid, Claude Rains	Film noir	Warner Bros.
Decoy	Jack Bernhard	Jean Gillie, Edward Norris, Robert Armstrong	Film noir	Monogram
The Desert Horseman	Ray Nazarro	Charles Starrett, Smiley Burnette, John Merton	Western	Columbia
Devil Bat's Daughter	Frank Wisbar	Rosemary La Planche, Molly Lamont, Nolan Leary	Horror	PRC
The Devil's Mask	Henry Levin	Anita Louise, Jim Bannon, Mona Barrie	Crime	Columbia
The Devil's Playground	George Archainbaud	William Boyd, Elaine Riley, Andy Clyde	Western	United Artists
Devotion	Curtis Bernhardt	Ida Lupino, Paul Henreid, Olivia de Havilland	Biography	Warner Bros.
The Diary of a Chambermaid	Jean Renoir	Paulette Goddard, Burgess Meredith, Hurd Hatfield	Drama	United Artists
Dick Tracy vs. Cueball	Gordon Douglas	Morgan Conway, Esther Howard, Anne Jeffreys	Mystery	RKO
Ding Dong Williams	William Berke	Glen Vernon, Marcy McGuire, Anne Jeffreys	Comedy	RKO
Don't Gamble with Strangers	William Beaudine	Kane Richmond, Bernadene Hayes, Gloria Warren	Drama	Monogram
Do You Love Me	Gregory Ratoff	Maureen O'Hara, Harry James, Dick Haymes	Musical	20th Century Fox
Don Ricardo Returns	Terry O. Morse	Lita Baron, Martin Garralaga, Fred Coby	Adventure	PRC
Down Missouri Way	Josef Berne	Martha O'Driscoll, John Carradine, Eddie Dean	Musical	PRC
Dragonwyck	Joseph L. Mankiewicz	Gene Tierney, Walter Huston, Vincent Price	Drama	20th Century Fox. From book by Anya Seton
Dressed to Kill	Roy William Neill	Basil Rathbone, Nigel Bruce, Patricia Morison	Mystery	Universal. Sherlock Holmes
Drifting Along	Derwin Abrahams	Johnny Mack Brown, Lynne Carver, Raymond Hatton	Western	Monogram
Driftin' River	Robert Emmett Tansey	Eddie Dean, Shirley Patterson, Roscoe Ates	Western	PRC
Duel in the Sun	King Vidor	Gregory Peck, Joseph Cotten, Jennifer Jones	Western	Selznick

== E ==
Title	Director	Cast	Genre	Notes
Earl Carroll Sketchbook	Albert S. Rogell	Constance Moore, Edward Everett Horton, Hillary Brooke	Musical	Republic
Easy to Wed	Edward Buzzell	Lucille Ball, Esther Williams, Van Johnson	Comedy	MGM
The El Paso Kid	Thomas Carr	Sunset Carson, Marie Harmon, Edmund Cobb	Western	Republic

== F ==
Title	Director	Cast	Genre	Notes
The Fabulous Suzanne	Steve Sekely	Barbara Britton, Rudy Vallée, Otto Kruger	Romantic comedy	Republic
The Face of Marble	William Beaudine	John Carradine, Claudia Drake, Robert Shayne	Horror	Monogram
Faithful in My Fashion	Sidney Salkow	Donna Reed, Tom Drake, Edward Everett Horton	Comedy	MGM
The Falcon's Adventure	William Berke	Tom Conway, Myrna Dell, Madge Meredith	Mystery	RKO
The Falcon's Alibi	Ray McCarey	Tom Conway, Rita Corday, Jane Greer	Mystery	RKO
Fear	Alfred Zeisler	Peter Cookson, Warren William, Anne Gwynne	Drama	Monogram
The Fighting Frontiersman	Derwin Abrahams	Charles Starrett, Helen Mowery, Smiley Burnette	Western	Columbia
The Fighting Guardsman	Henry Levin	Willard Parker, Anita Louise, Janis Carter, John Loder	Adventure	Columbia
Flight to Nowhere	William Rowland	Alan Curtis, Evelyn Ankers, Micheline Cheirel	Film Noir	Lippert
The Flying Serpent	Sam Newfield	George Zucco, Eddie Acuff, Wheaton Chambers	Horror	PRC
Freddie Steps Out	Arthur Dreifuss	Freddie Stewart, June Preisser, Noel Neill	Comedy	Monogram
The French Key	Walter Colmes	Albert Dekker, Mike Mazurki, Evelyn Ankers	Mystery	Republic
From This Day Forward	John Berry	Joan Fontaine, Mark Stevens, Rosemary DeCamp	Drama	RKO
Frontier Gunlaw	Derwin Abrahams	Charles Starrett, Jack Rockwell, Dub Taylor	Western	Columbia

== G ==
Title	Director	Cast	Genre	Notes
G.I. War Brides	George Blair	Anna Lee, James Ellison, Harry Davenport	Comedy	Republic
Gallant Bess	Andrew Marton	Marshall Thompson, George Tobias, Clem Bevans	Family western	MGM
Gallant Journey	William A. Wellman	Glenn Ford, Janet Blair, Charlie Ruggles	Historical	Columbia
Galloping Thunder	Ray Nazarro	Charles Starrett, Smiley Burnette, Merle Travis	Western	Columbia
Gas House Kids	Sam Newfield	Robert Lowery, Billy Halop, Teala Loring	Comedy	PRC
Gay Blades	George Blair	Jean Rogers, Allan Lane, Frank Albertson	Comedy	Republic
The Gay Cavalier	William Nigh	Gilbert Roland, Martin Garralaga, Ramsay Ames	Western	Monogram
Genius at Work	Leslie Goodwins	Anne Jeffreys, Wally Brown, Alan Carney	Comedy	RKO
The Gentleman from Texas	Lambert Hillyer	Johnny Mack Brown, Claudia Drake, Raymond Hatton	Western	Monogram
Gentleman Joe Palooka	Cy Endfield	Leon Errol, Joe Kirkwood, Elyse Knox	Sports	Monogram
The Gentleman Misbehaves	George Sherman	Bob Haymes, Osa Massen, Hillary Brooke	Musical comedy	Columbia
Gentlemen with Guns	Sam Newfield	Buster Crabbe, Al St. John, Steve Darrell	Western	PRC
Ghost of Hidden Valley	Sam Newfield	Buster Crabbe, Al St. John, Jean Carlin	Western	PRC
Gilda	Charles Vidor	Glenn Ford, Rita Hayworth, George Macready	Film noir	Columbia
Ginger	Oliver Drake	Frank Albertson, Barbara Read, Janet Burston	Drama	Monogram
Girl on the Spot	William Beaudine	Lois Collier, Jess Barker, George Dolenz	Musical crime	Universal
The Glass Alibi	W. Lee Wilder	Maris Wrixon, Anne Gwynne, Paul Kelly	Drama	Republic
God's Country	Robert Emmett Tansey	Robert Lowery, Helen Gilbert, Buster Keaton	Western	Lippert
The Great Morgan	Nat Perrin	Frank Morgan, Tommy Dorsey, Leon Ames	Musical	MGM
The Green Years	Victor Saville	Charles Coburn, Tom Drake, Beverly Tyler	Comedy, Drama	MGM
Gun Town	Wallace Fox	Kirby Grant, Claire Carleton, Lyle Talbot	Western	Universal
Gunman's Code	Wallace Fox	Kirby Grant, Jane Adams, Fuzzy Knight	Western	Universal
Gunning for Vengeance	Ray Nazarro	Charles Starrett, Smiley Burnette, Lane Chandler	Western	Columbia
A Guy Could Change	William K. Howard	Allan Lane, Jane Frazee, Wallace Ford	Drama	Republic

== H ==
Title	Director	Cast	Genre	Notes
The Haunted Mine	Derwin Abrahams	Johnny Mack Brown, Raymond Hatton, Riley Hill	Western	Monogram
The Harvey Girls	George Sidney	Judy Garland, Ray Bolger, Angela Lansbury	Musical	MGM. Academy Award for Best Song
Heading West	Ray Nazarro	Charles Starrett, Doris Houck, Smiley Burnette	Western	Columbia
Heartbeat	Sam Wood	Ginger Rogers, Jean-Pierre Aumont, Adolphe Menjou	Comedy	RKO
Heldorado	William Witney	Roy Rogers, George "Gabby" Hayes, Dale Evans	Western	Republic
Her Adventurous Night	John Rawlins	Dennis O'Keefe, Helen Walker, Fuzzy Knight	Comedy	Universal
Her Kind of Man	Frederick de Cordova	Janis Paige, Zachary Scott, Dane Clark	Crime	Warner Bros.
Her Sister's Secret	Edgar G. Ulmer	Nancy Coleman, Margaret Lindsay, Phillip Reed	Drama	Warner Bros.
High School Hero	Arthur Dreifuss	Freddie Stewart, June Preisser, Noel Neill	Comedy	Monogram
Holiday in Mexico	George Sidney	Jane Powell, Walter Pidgeon, Roddy McDowall	Musical	MGM
Home in Oklahoma	William Witney	Roy Rogers, Dale Evans, Carol Hughes	Western	Republic
Home on the Range	R. G. Springsteen	Monte Hale, Lorna Gray, Bob Nolan	Western	Republic
Home Sweet Homicide	Lloyd Bacon	Peggy Ann Garner, Randolph Scott, Lynn Bari	Mystery	20th Century Fox
The Hoodlum Saint	Norman Taurog	William Powell, Esther Williams, Angela Lansbury	Drama	MGM
Hot Cargo	Lew Landers	Jean Rogers, William Gargan, Phillip Reed	Drama	Paramount
House of Horrors	Jean Yarbrough	Rondo Hatton, Robert Lowery, Virginia Grey	Horror	Universal
Humoresque	Jean Negulesco	John Garfield, Joan Crawford, Oscar Levant	Melodrama	Warner Bros.

== I ==
Title	Director	Cast	Genre	Notes
I Ring Doorbells	Frank R. Strayer	Anne Gwynne, Robert Shayne, Roscoe Karns	Mystery	PRC
Idea Girl	Will Jason	Jess Barker, Julie Bishop, Alan Mowbray	Comedy	Universal
If I'm Lucky	Lewis Seiler	Vivian Blaine, Perry Como, Carmen Miranda	Musical	20th Century Fox
In Fast Company	Del Lord	Bowery Boys, Jane Randolph, Judy Clark	Comedy	Monogram
In Old Sacramento	Joseph Kane	Bill Elliott, Constance Moore, Ruth Donnelly	Western	Republic
The Inner Circle	Philip Ford	Adele Mara, Warren Douglas, Ricardo Cortez	Mystery	Republic
Inside Job	Jean Yarbrough	Preston Foster, Ann Rutherford, Alan Curtis	Crime	Universal
The Invisible Informer	Philip Ford	Linda Stirling, William Henry, Adele Mara	Crime	Republic
It's Great to Be Young	Del Lord	Leslie Brooks, Jeff Donnell, Jimmy Lloyd	Musical	Columbia
It's a Wonderful Life	Frank Capra	James Stewart, Donna Reed, Lionel Barrymore	Fantasy	RKO. Nominated for five Academy Awards
It Shouldn't Happen to a Dog	Herbert I. Leeds	Carole Landis, Allyn Joslyn, Margo Woode	Comedy	20th Century Fox
I've Always Loved You	Frank Borzage	Catherine McLeod, Philip Dorn, Maria Ouspenskaya	Romance	Republic

== J ==
Title	Director	Cast	Genre	Notes
Janie Gets Married	Vincent Sherman	Joan Leslie, Ann Harding, Edward Arnold	Comedy	Warner Bros. Sequel to 1944 film
Joe Palooka, Champ	Reginald LeBorg	Leon Errol, Joe Kirkwood, Elyse Knox	Sports	Monogram
Johnny Comes Flying Home	Benjamin Stoloff	Richard Crane, Faye Marlowe, Martha Stewart	Drama	20th Century Fox
The Jolson Story	Alfred E. Green	Larry Parks, Evelyn Keyes, William Demarest	Biography	Columbia
Junior Prom	Arthur Dreifuss	Freddie Stewart, Judy Clark, Noel Neill	Musical	Monogram
Just Before Dawn	William Castle	Warner Baxter, Martin Kosleck, Mona Barrie	Mystery	Columbia. Part of Crime Doctor series

== K ==
Title	Director	Cast	Genre	Notes
The Kid from Brooklyn	Norman Z. McLeod	Danny Kaye, Virginia Mayo, Vera-Ellen	Comedy	RKO. Remake of The Milky Way
The Killers	Robert Siodmak	Ava Gardner, Burt Lancaster, Edmond O'Brien	Film noir	Universal; Remade in 1964

== L ==
Title	Director	Cast	Genre	Notes
Lady Chaser	Sam Newfield	Robert Lowery, Ann Savage, Frank Ferguson	Mystery	PRC
Lady Luck	Edwin L. Marin	Robert Young, Barbara Hale, Frank Morgan	Comedy	RKO
Landrush	Vernon Keays	Charles Starrett, Doris Houck, Smiley Burnette	Western	Columbia
Larceny in Her Heart	Sam Newfield	Hugh Beaumont, Cheryl Walker, Ralph Dunn	Mystery	PRC
The Last Crooked Mile	Philip Ford	Don "Red" Barry, Ann Savage, Adele Mara	Crime	Republic
Lawless Breed	Wallace Fox	Kirby Grant, Jane Adams, Fuzzy Knight	Western	Universal
A Letter for Evie	Jules Dassin	Marsha Hunt, John Carroll, Hume Cronyn	Comedy	MGM
Little Giant	William A. Seiter	Abbott and Costello, Brenda Joyce, Elena Verdugo	Comedy	Universal
Little Iodine	Reginald LeBorg	Irene Ryan, Hobart Cavanaugh, Leon Belasco	Comedy	United Artists. Based on comic strip
Little Miss Big	Erle C. Kenton	Fay Holden, Frank McHugh, Dorothy Morris	Comedy drama	Universal
Little Mister Jim	Fred Zinnemann	James Craig, Butch Jenkins, Frances Gifford	Drama	MGM
Live Wires	Phil Karlson	Leo Gorcey, Huntz Hall, Claudia Drake	Comedy	Monogram. The Bowery Boys
The Locket	John Brahm	Laraine Day, Brian Aherne, Robert Mitchum	Film noir	RKO
Lone Star Moonlight	Ray Nazarro	Ken Curtis, Joan Barton, Guy Kibbee	Western	Columbia
Love Laughs at Andy Hardy	Willis Goldbeck	Mickey Rooney, Lewis Stone, Bonita Granville	Comedy	MGM
Lover Come Back	William A. Seiter	George Brent, Lucille Ball, Vera Zorina	Comedy	Universal

== M ==
Title	Director	Cast	Genre	Notes
The Madonna's Secret	Wilhelm Thiele	Francis Lederer, Gail Patrick, Ann Rutherford	Mystery	Republic
Magnificent Doll	Frank Borzage	Ginger Rogers, David Niven, Burgess Meredith	Historical	Universal
The Magnificent Rogue	Albert S. Rogell	Lynne Roberts, Warren Douglas, Stephanie Bachelor	Comedy	Republic
Make Mine Music	Jack Kinney, Clyde Geronimi	Dinah Shore, Benny Goodman, Nelson Eddy, Andrews Sisters	Animated	Disney, RKO
Man from Rainbow Valley	R. G. Springsteen	Monte Hale, Lorna Gray, Emmett Lynn	Western	Republic
The Man Who Dared	John Sturges	Leslie Brooks, George Macready, Forrest Tucker	Drama	Columbia
Margie	Henry King	Jeanne Crain, Glenn Langan, Lynn Bari	Comedy	20th Century Fox
The Mask of Diijon	Lew Landers	Erich von Stroheim, Jeanne Bates, Denise Vernac	Film Noir	PRC
Meet Me on Broadway	Leigh Jason	Marjorie Reynolds, Jinx Falkenburg, Allen Jenkins	Musical	Columbia
The Missing Lady	Phil Karlson	Kane Richmond, Barbara Read, Pierre Watkin	Mystery	Monogram. The Shadow series
Miss Susie Slagle's	John Berry	Veronica Lake, Sonny Tufts, Joan Caulfield	Romance	Paramount
Monsieur Beaucaire	George Marshall	Bob Hope, Joan Caulfield, Patric Knowles	Comedy	Paramount
Moon Over Montana	Oliver Drake	Jimmy Wakely, Jennifer Holt, Jack Ingram	Western	Monogram
Mr. Ace	Edwin L. Marin	George Raft, Sylvia Sidney, Jerome Cowan	Crime	United Artists
Mr. Hex	William Beaudine	Leo Gorcey, Huntz Hall, Gale Robbins	Comedy	Monogram
Murder in the Music Hall	John English	Nancy Kelly, Vera Ralston, William Marshall	Musical	Republic Pictures
Murder Is My Business	Sam Newfield	Hugh Beaumont, Cheryl Walker, Lyle Talbot	Mystery	PRC
My Darling Clementine	John Ford	Henry Fonda, Victor Mature, Linda Darnell	Western	20th Century Fox
My Dog Shep	Ford Beebe	Tom Neal, William Farnum, Sarah Padden	Drama	Lippert
My Pal Trigger	Frank McDonald	Roy Rogers, Dale Evans, Jack Holt	Western	Republic
My Reputation	Curtis Bernhardt	Barbara Stanwyck, George Brent, Eve Arden	Romance	Warner Bros.
Mysterious Intruder	William Castle	Richard Dix, Barton MacLane, Nina Vale	Film noir	Columbia
The Mysterious Mr. Valentine	Philip Ford	William Henry, Linda Stirling, Virginia Christine	Film noir	Republic

== N ==
Title	Director	Cast	Genre	Notes
Never Say Goodbye	James V. Kern	Errol Flynn, Eleanor Parker, Lucile Watson	Comedy	Warner Bros.
Night and Day	Michael Curtiz	Cary Grant, Alexis Smith, Jane Wyman	Musical	Warner Bros.; biography of Cole Porter
Night Editor	Henry Levin	William Gargan, Janis Carter, Jeff Donnell	Film noir	Columbia
A Night in Casablanca	Archie Mayo	Marx Brothers, Sig Ruman, Lois Collier	Comedy	United Artists
Night in Paradise	Arthur Lubin	Merle Oberon, Turhan Bey, Gale Sondergaard	Comedy drama	Universal
Night Train to Memphis	Lesley Selander	Roy Acuff, Allan Lane, Adele Mara	Action	Republic
Nobody Lives Forever	Jean Negulesco	John Garfield, Geraldine Fitzgerald, Faye Emerson	Film noir	Warner Bros.
Nocturne	Edwin L. Marin	George Raft, Lynn Bari, Virginia Huston	Film noir	RKO
No Leave, No Love	Charles Martin	Van Johnson, Patricia Kirkwood, Edward Arnold	Musical	MGM
Notorious	Alfred Hitchcock	Cary Grant, Ingrid Bergman, Claude Rains	Film Noir	RKO. Nominated for two Academy Awards
The Notorious Lone Wolf	D. Ross Lederman	Gerald Mohr, Janis Carter, Eric Blore	Adventure	Columbia

== O ==
Title	Director	Cast	Genre	Notes
Of Human Bondage	Edmund Goulding	Paul Henreid, Eleanor Parker, Janis Paige	Drama	Warner Bros. Somerset Maugham book; remake of 1934 film
One Exciting Week	William Beaudine	Al Pearce, Jerome Cowan, Arlene Harris	Comedy	Republic
One More Tomorrow	Peter Godfrey	Ann Sheridan, Jane Wyman, Dennis Morgan	Drama	Warner Bros.
One Way to Love	Ray Enright	Marguerite Chapman, Chester Morris, Janis Carter	Comedy	Columbia
O.S.S.	Irving Pichel	Alan Ladd, Geraldine Fitzgerald, Patric Knowles	Suspense	Paramount
Our Hearts Were Growing Up	William D. Russell	Gail Russell, Diana Lynn, Brian Donlevy	Comedy	Paramount
Out California Way	Lesley Selander	Monte Hale, Lorna Gray, Roy Rogers	Western	Republic
Outlaws of the Plains	Sam Newfield	Buster Crabbe, Al St. John, Bud Osborne	Western	PRC
Overland Riders	Sam Newfield	Buster Crabbe, Al St. John, Patti McCarty	Western	PRC

== P–Q ==
Title	Director	Cast	Genre	Notes
Partners in Time	William Nigh	Chester Lauck, Pamela Blake, Teala Loring	Comedy	RKO
Passkey to Danger	Lesley Selander	Kane Richmond, Stephanie Bachelor, Adele Mara	Thriller	Republic
People Are Funny	Sam White	Jack Haley, Helen Walker, Rudy Vallée	Comedy	Paramount
Perilous Holiday	Edward H. Griffith	Pat O'Brien, Ruth Warrick, Audrey Long	Crime	Columbia
Personality Kid	George Sherman	Anita Louise, Ted Donaldson, Barbara Brown	Drama	Columbia
The Phantom Thief	D. Ross Lederman	Chester Morris, Jeff Donnell, Richard Lane	Mystery	Columbia. Boston Blackie series
Plainsman and the Lady	Joseph Kane	Wild Bill Elliott, Vera Ralston, Gail Patrick	Western	Republic
The Postman Always Rings Twice	Tay Garnett	Lana Turner, John Garfield, Cecil Kellaway	Film noir	MGM. From book by James M. Cain
Prairie Badmen	Sam Newfield	Buster Crabbe, Al St. John, Charles King	Western	PRC
Queen of Burlesque	Sam Newfield	Evelyn Ankers, Carleton G. Young, Marion Martin	Drama	PRC

== R ==
Title	Director	Cast	Genre	Notes
Rainbow Over Texas	Frank McDonald	Roy Rogers, Dale Evans, George "Gabby" Hayes	Western	Republic
The Razor's Edge	Edmund Goulding	Tyrone Power, Gene Tierney, Anne Baxter	Drama	20th Century Fox; from book by Somerset Maugham
The Red Dragon	Phil Rosen	Sidney Toler, Benson Fong, Carol Hughes	Mystery	Monogram. Charlie Chan
Red River Renegades	Thomas Carr	Sunset Carson, Peggy Stewart, Tom London	Western	Republic
Rendezvous with Annie	Allan Dwan	Eddie Albert, Faye Marlowe, Gail Patrick	Comedy	Republic
Rendezvous 24	James Tinling	William Gargan, Maria Palmer, Patrick O'Moore	Thriller	20th Century Fox
Renegade Girl	William Berke	Ann Savage, Alan Curtis, Jack Holt	Western	Lippert
Renegades	George Sherman	Evelyn Keyes, Willard Parker, Larry Parks	Western	Columbia
The Return of Monte Cristo	Henry Levin	Louis Hayward, Barbara Britton, George Macready	Adventure	Columbia
The Return of Rusty	William Castle	Ted Donaldson, John Litel, Barbara Woodell	Drama	Columbia
Rio Grande Raiders	Thomas Carr	Sunset Carson, Linda Stirling, Bob Steele	Western	Republic
Riverboat Rhythm	Leslie Goodwins	Leon Errol, Glen Vernon, Walter Catlett	Comedy	RKO
Road to Utopia	Hal Walker	Bing Crosby, Bob Hope, Dorothy Lamour	Musical comedy	Paramount. Fourth of series
Roaring Rangers	Ray Nazarro	Charles Starrett, Smiley Burnette, Merle Travis	Western	Columbia
Roll on Texas Moon	William Witney	Roy Rogers, Dale Evans, Dennis Hoey	Western	Republic
Rolling Home	William Berke	Jean Parker, Pamela Blake, Russell Hayden	Drama	Lippert
Romance of the West	Robert Emmett Tansey	Eddie Dean, Emmett Lynn, Forrest Taylor	Western	PRC
The Runaround	Charles Lamont	Rod Cameron, Ella Raines, Broderick Crawford	Comedy mystery	Universal
Rustler's Round-Up	Wallace Fox	Kirby Grant, Jane Adams, Fuzzy Knight	Western	Universal

== S ==
Title	Director	Cast	Genre	Notes
San Quentin	Gordon Douglas	Lawrence Tierney, Barton MacLane, Carol Forman	Crime	RKO
Santa Fe Uprising	R. G. Springsteen	Allan Lane, Martha Wentworth, Barton MacLane	Western	Republic
A Scandal in Paris	Douglas Sirk	George Sanders, Carole Landis, Signe Hasso	Historical	United Artists
The Searching Wind	William Dieterle	Robert Young, Sylvia Sidney, Ann Richards	Drama	Paramount
The Secret Heart	Robert Z. Leonard	Claudette Colbert, Walter Pidgeon, June Allyson	Drama	MGM
The Secret of the Whistler	George Sherman	Richard Dix, Leslie Brooks, Mona Barrie	Mystery	Columbia
Sentimental Journey	Walter Lang	Maureen O'Hara, John Payne, William Bendix	Drama	20th Century Fox
Shadow of a Woman	Joseph Santley	Helmut Dantine, Andrea King, William Prince	Film noir	Warner Bros.
Shadowed	John Sturges	Anita Louise, Lloyd Corrigan, Mark Roberts	Crime	Columbia
The Shadow Returns	Phil Rosen	Kane Richmond, Barbara Read, Joseph Crehan	Mystery	Monogram
Shadows on the Range	Lambert Hillyer	Johnny Mack Brown, Raymond Hatton, Jack Perrin	Western	Monogram
Shadows Over Chinatown	Terry O. Morse	Sidney Toler, Mantan Moreland, Victor Sen Yung	Mystery	Monogram. Charlie Chan
She-Wolf of London	Jean Yarbrough	June Lockhart, Don Porter, Sara Haden	Horror	Universal
She Wrote the Book	Charles Lamont	Joan Davis, Jack Oakie, Mischa Auer	Comedy	Universal
Sheriff of Redwood Valley	R. G. Springsteen	Wild Bill Elliott, Peggy Stewart, Bob Steele	Western	Republic
Shock	Alfred L. Werker	Vincent Price, Lynn Bari, Frank Latimore	Horror	20th Century Fox
The Show-Off	Harry Beaumont	Red Skelton, Marilyn Maxwell, Virginia O'Brien	Comedy	MGM
Silver Range	Lambert Hillyer	Johnny Mack Brown, Raymond Hatton, Terry Frost	Western	Monogram
Sing While You Dance	D. Ross Lederman	Ellen Drew, Bob Haymes, Robert Kellard	Musical	Columbia
Singing on the Trail	Ray Nazarro	Ken Curtis, Jeff Donnell, Guy Kibbee	Western	Columbia
Singin' in the Corn	Del Lord	Judy Canova, Allen Jenkins, Guinn "Big Boy" Williams	Comedy	Columbia
Sioux City Sue	Frank McDonald	Gene Autry, Lynne Roberts, Sterling Holloway	Western	Republic
Sister Kenny	Dudley Nichols, Jack Gage	Rosalind Russell, Alexander Knox, Dean Jagger	Biography	RKO
Six Gun Man	Harry L. Fraser	Bob Steele, Syd Saylor, Jean Carlin	Western	PRC
Slightly Scandalous	Will Jason	Sheila Ryan, Lita Baron, Paula Drew	Comedy	Universal
Smoky	Louis King	Fred MacMurray, Anne Baxter, Bruce Cabot	Western	20th Century Fox. Remade in 1966
Smooth as Silk	Charles Barton	Kent Taylor, Virginia Grey, Jane Adams	Film noir	Universal
So Dark the Night	Joseph H. Lewis	Steven Geray, Micheline Cheirel, Eugene Borden	Film noir	Columbia
So Goes My Love	Frank Ryan	Myrna Loy, Don Ameche, Molly Lamont	Comedy	Universal
Somewhere in the Night	Joseph L. Mankiewicz	John Hodiak, Lloyd Nolan, Nancy Guild	Film noir	20th Century Fox
Song of Arizona	Frank McDonald	Roy Rogers, Dale Evans, Lyle Talbot	Western	Republic
Song of the Sierras	Oliver Drake	Jimmy Wakely, Jack Baxley, Jean Carlin	Western	Monogram
Song of the South	Wilfred Jackson	James Baskett, Bobby Driscoll, Luana Patten	Animated	RKO
South of Monterey	William Nigh	Gilbert Roland, Martin Garralaga, Frank Yaconelli	Western	Monogram
Specter of the Rose	Ben Hecht	Judith Anderson, Michael Chekhov, Lionel Stander	Drama	Republic
The Spider Woman Strikes Back	Arthur Lubin	Gale Sondergaard, Kirby Grant, Brenda Joyce	Horror	Universal
Spook Busters	William Beaudine	Leo Gorcey, Huntz Hall, Tanis Chandler	Comedy Horror	Monogram
The Spiral Staircase	Robert Siodmak	Dorothy McGuire, George Brent, Rhonda Fleming	Horror	RKO. Remade in 1975
Stagecoach to Denver	R. G. Springsteen	Allan Lane, Peggy Stewart, Roy Barcroft	Western	Republic
Stars Over Texas	Robert Emmett Tansey	Eddie Dean, Roscoe Ates, Shirley Patterson	Western	PRC
Step by Step	Phil Rosen	Lawrence Tierney, Anne Jeffreys, Myrna Dell	Crime	RKO
A Stolen Life	Curtis Bernhardt	Bette Davis, Glenn Ford, Dane Clark	Drama	Warner Bros.
Strange Conquest	John Rawlins	Jane Wyatt, Lowell Gilmore, Julie Bishop	Drama	Universal
Strange Impersonation	Anthony Mann	Brenda Marshall, William Gargan, Hillary Brooke	Drama	Republic
Strange Journey	James Tinling	Paul Kelly, Osa Massen, Hillary Brooke, Lee Patrick	Drama	20th Century Fox
The Strange Love of Martha Ivers	Lewis Milestone	Barbara Stanwyck, Van Heflin, Lizabeth Scott	Film noir	Paramount. First film of Kirk Douglas
Strange Voyage	Irving Allen	Eddie Albert, Forrest Taylor, Ray Teal	Adventure	Monogram
The Stranger	Orson Welles	Edward G. Robinson, Loretta Young, Orson Welles	Film noir	RKO
Strange Triangle	Ray McCarey	Signe Hasso, Preston Foster, Anabel Shaw	Drama	20th Century Fox
The Strange Woman	Edgar G. Ulmer	Hedy Lamarr, George Sanders, Louis Hayward	Drama	United Artists
Strangler of the Swamp	Frank Wisbar	Rosemary La Planche, Blake Edwards, Robert Barrat	Horror	PRC
Sun Valley Cyclone	R. G. Springsteen	Wild Bill Elliott, Alice Fleming, Robert Blake	Western	Republic
Sunset Pass	William Berke	James Warren, Nan Leslie, Jane Greer	Western	RKO
Susie Steps Out	Reginald LeBorg	David Bruce, Margaret Dumont, Grady Sutton	Comedy	United Artists
Suspense	Frank Tuttle	Barry Sullivan, Belita, Albert Dekker	Film noir	Monogram
Swamp Fire	William H. Pine	Johnny Weissmuller, Virginia Grey, Carol Thurston	Adventure	Paramount
Sweetheart of Sigma Chi	Jack Bernhard	Phil Regan, Elyse Knox, Ross Hunter	Musical comedy	Monogram
Swell Guy	Frank Tuttle	Sonny Tufts, Ann Blyth, Ruth Warrick	Drama	Universal
Swing, Cowboy, Swing	Elmer Clifton	Max Terhune, I. Stanford Jolley, Ted Adams	Western	Astor
Swing Parade of 1946	Phil Karlson	Gale Storm, Phil Regan, Three Stooges	Musical comedy	Monogram

== T ==
Title	Director	Cast	Genre	Notes
Talk About a Lady	George Sherman	Jinx Falkenburg, Forrest Tucker, Trudy Marshall	Musical	Columbia
Tangier	George Waggner	Maria Montez, Robert Paige, Sabu	Thriller	Universal
Tars and Spars	Alfred E. Green	Alfred Drake, Janet Blair, Jeff Donnell	Musical	Columbia
Tarzan and the Leopard Woman	Kurt Neumann	Johnny Weissmuller, Brenda Joyce, Johnny Sheffield	Adventure	RKO
Temptation	Irving Pichel	Merle Oberon, George Brent, Paul Lukas	Film Noir	Universal
Terror by Night	Roy William Neill	Basil Rathbone, Nigel Bruce, Dennis Hoey	Mystery	Universal
Terror Trail	Ray Nazarro	Charles Starrett, Barbara Pepper, Smiley Burnette	Western	Columbia
Terrors on Horseback	Sam Newfield	Buster Crabbe, Al St. John, Patti McCarty	Western	PRC
That Brennan Girl	Alfred Santell	Mona Freeman, James Dunn, June Duprez	Drama	Republic
That Texas Jamboree	Ray Nazarro	Ken Curtis, Jeff Donnell, Andy Clyde	Western	Columbia
They Made Me a Killer	William C. Thomas	Robert Lowery, Barbara Britton, Lola Lane	Film noir	Paramount
Three Little Girls in Blue	H. Bruce Humberstone	June Haver, Vera-Ellen, Vivian Blaine	Musical	20th Century Fox
Three Strangers	Jean Negulesco	Sydney Greenstreet, Geraldine Fitzgerald, Peter Lorre	Crime	Warner Bros.
Three Wise Fools	Edward Buzzell	Margaret O'Brien, Lionel Barrymore, Lewis Stone	Comedy drama	MGM
The Thrill of Brazil	S. Sylvan Simon	Ann Miller, Evelyn Keyes, Keenan Wynn	Musical	Columbia
Throw a Saddle on a Star	Ray Nazarro	Ken Curtis, Jeff Donnell, Guinn "Big Boy" Williams	Western	Columbia
Thunder Town	Harry L. Fraser	Bob Steele, Syd Saylor, Ellen Hall	Western	PRC
Till the Clouds Roll By	Richard Whorf	Robert Walker, Judy Garland, June Allyson	Musical	MGM. Biography of Jerome Kern
Till the End of Time	Edward Dmytryk	Dorothy McGuire, Guy Madison, Robert Mitchum	Drama	RKO
The Time of Their Lives	Charles Barton	Abbott and Costello, Marjorie Reynolds, Binnie Barnes	Comedy	Universal
The Time, the Place and the Girl	David Butler	Dennis Morgan, Janis Paige, Martha Vickers	Musical	Warner Bros.
To Each His Own	Mitchell Leisen	Olivia de Havilland, John Lund, Roland Culver	Drama	Paramount
Tokyo Rose	Lew Landers	Byron Barr, Osa Massen, Keye Luke	Thriller	Paramount
Tomorrow Is Forever	Irving Pichel	Claudette Colbert, Orson Welles, George Brent	Drama	RKO
Traffic in Crime	Lesley Selander	Kane Richmond, Anne Nagel, Adele Mara	Action	Republic
Trail to Mexico	Oliver Drake	Jimmy Wakely, Lee "Lasses" White, Julian Rivero	Western	Monogram
The Trap	Howard Bretherton	Sidney Toler, Victor Sen Yung, Tanis Chandler	Mystery	Monogram. Charlie Chan
Trigger Fingers	Lambert Hillyer	Johnny Mack Brown, Raymond Hatton, Jennifer Holt	Western	Monogram
The Truth About Murder	Lew Landers	Bonita Granville, Rita Corday, Morgan Conway	Mystery	RKO
Tumbleweed Trail	Robert Emmett Tansey	Eddie Dean, Shirley Patterson, Roscoe Ates	Western	PRC
Two-Fisted Stranger	Ray Nazarro	Charles Starrett, Smiley Burnette, Doris Houck	Western	Columbia
Two Guys from Milwaukee	David Butler	Dennis Morgan, Jack Carson, Joan Leslie	Comedy	Warner Bros.
Two Sisters from Boston	Henry Koster	Kathryn Grayson, June Allyson, Peter Lawford	Musical	MGM
Two Smart People	Jules Dassin	Lucille Ball, John Hodiak, Lloyd Nolan	Crime	MGM
Two Years Before the Mast	John Farrow	Alan Ladd, Barry Fitzgerald, Esther Fernandez	Adventure	Paramount. From book by Richard Henry Dana Jr.

== U ==
Title	Director	Cast	Genre	Notes
Under Arizona Skies	Lambert Hillyer	Johnny Mack Brown, Reno Browne, Raymond Hatton	Western	Monogram
Under Nevada Skies	Frank McDonald	Roy Rogers, Dale Evans, George "Gabby" Hayes	Western	Republic
Undercurrent	Vincente Minnelli	Katharine Hepburn, Robert Taylor, Robert Mitchum	Film noir	MGM
The Undercover Woman	Thomas Carr	Stephanie Bachelor, Robert Livingston, Richard Fraser	Mystery	Republic
The Unknown	Henry Levin	Karen Morley, Jeff Donnell, Mark Roberts	Horror Mystery	Columbia
Up Goes Maisie	Harry Beaumont	Ann Sothern, George Murphy, Hillary Brooke	Comedy	MGM

== V ==
Title	Director	Cast	Genre	Notes
Vacation in Reno	Leslie Goodwins	Jack Haley, Anne Jeffreys, Iris Adrian	Comedy	RKO
Valley of the Zombies	Philip Ford	Robert Livingston, Lorna Gray, Ian Keith	Horror	Republic
The Verdict	Don Siegel	Peter Lorre, Sydney Greenstreet, George Coulouris	Film noir	Warner Bros. Siegel's first film
The Virginian	Stuart Gilmore	Joel McCrea, Brian Donlevy, Barbara Britton	Western	Paramount. From book by Owen Wister

== W–Z ==
Title	Director	Cast	Genre	Notes
Wake Up and Dream	Lloyd Bacon	John Payne, June Haver, Charlotte Greenwood	Drama	20th Century Fox
The Walls Came Tumbling Down	Lothar Mendes	Lee Bowman, Marguerite Chapman, George Macready	Crime	Columbia
The Well Groomed Bride	Sidney Lanfield	Olivia de Havilland, Ray Milland, Sonny Tufts	Comedy	Paramount
West of the Alamo	Oliver Drake	Jimmy Wakely, Ray Whitley, Jack Ingram	Western	Monogram
Whistle Stop	Léonide Moguy	George Raft, Ava Gardner, Victor McLaglen	Film noir	United Artists
White Tie and Tails	Charles Barton	Dan Duryea, Ella Raines, William Bendix	Comedy	Universal
The Wife of Monte Cristo	Edgar G. Ulmer	John Loder, Lenore Aubert, Fritz Kortner	Adventure	PRC
Wife Wanted	Phil Karlson	Kay Francis, Paul Cavanagh, Veda Ann Borg	Crime	Monogram
Wild Beauty	Wallace Fox	Don Porter, Lois Collier, Jacqueline deWit	Western	Universal
Wild West	Robert Emmett Tansey	Eddie Dean, Roscoe Ates, Louise Currie	Western	PRC
Winter Wonderland	Bernard Vorhaus	Lynne Roberts, Charles Drake, Eric Blore	Drama	Republic
Without Reservations	Mervyn LeRoy	Claudette Colbert, John Wayne, Don DeFore	Comedy	RKO
The Yearling	Clarence Brown	Gregory Peck, Jane Wyman, Claude Jarman Jr.	Family, Drama	MGM. From Marjorie Kinnan Rawlings book
Young Widow	Edwin L. Marin	Jane Russell, Louis Hayward, Faith Domergue, Marie Wilson	Drama	United Artists

== Serials ==
Title	Director	Cast	Genre	Notes
Chick Carter, Detective	Derwin Abrahams	Lyle Talbot, Julie Gibson	Serial	Columbia
The Crimson Ghost	Fred C. Brannon, William Witney	Charles Quigley, Linda Stirling	Serial	Republic
Daughter of Don Q	Spencer Gordon Bennet	Lorna Gray, Kirk Alyn	Serial	Republic
Hop Harrigan	Derwin Abrahams	Jennifer Holt, William Bakewell	Serial	
King of the Forest Rangers	Spencer Gordon Bennet	Larry Thompson	Serial	RKO
Lost City of the Jungle	Lewis D. Collins, Ray Taylor	Russell Hayden, Jane Adams	Serial	Universal
The Mysterious Mr. M	Lewis D. Collins and Vernon Keays	Richard Martin, Pamela Blake	Serial	Universal
The Phantom Rider	Spencer Gordon Bennet	Robert Kent	Serial	Republic
The Scarlet Horseman	Lewis D. Collins, Ray Taylor	Peter Cookson, Paul Guilfoyle	Serial	Universal

== Shorts ==
Title	Director	Cast	Genre	Notes
Baby Bottleneck	Robert Clampett	Looney Tunes	Animated	Warner Bros.
Baseball Bugs	Friz Freleng	Looney Tunes	Animated	Warner Bros.
Beer Barrel Polecats	Jules White	The Three Stooges	Short	Columbia
A Bird in the Head	Edward Bernds	The Three Stooges	Short	Columbia
Book Revue	Robert Clampett		Animated	Warner Bros.
Bunker Hill Bunny	I. Freleng	Bugs Bunny	Animated	Warner Bros.
The Cat Concerto	William Hanna	Tom and Jerry	Animated	MGM
G. I. Wanna Home	Jules White	The Three Stooges	Short subject	Columbia
Hair-Raising Hare	Charles M. Jones	Bugs Bunny	Animated	Warner Bros.
Hare Remover	Frank Tashlin	Bugs Bunny	Animated	Warner Bros.
Kitty Kornered	Robert Clampett		Animated	Warner Bros.
The Milky Waif	Hanna-Barbera	Tom and Jerry	Animated	MGM
Monkey Businessmen	Edward Bernds	The Three Stooges	Short subject	Columbia
Quentin Quail	Chuck Jones		Animation	Warner Bros.
Racketeer Rabbit	Friz Freleng	Bugs Bunny	Animation	Warner Bros.
Rhapsody Rabbit	I. Freleng	Bugs Bunny	Animation	Warner Bros.
Rhythm and Weep	Jules White	The Three Stooges	Short subject	Columbia
Solid Serenade	Hanna-Barbera	Tom and Jerry	Animation	MGM
Special Delivery			Propaganda	United States Air Force
Springtime for Thomas	Hanna-Barbera	Tom and Jerry	Animation	MGM
A Tale of Two Cities			Propaganda	on Japan bombings
That Justice Be Done			Propaganda	Office of War Information
Three Little Pirates	Edward Bernds	The Three Stooges	Short subject	Columbia
Three Loan Wolves	Jules White	The Three Stooges	Short subject	Columbia
The Three Troubledoers	Edward Bernds	The Three Stooges	Short subject	Columbia
Trap Happy	Hanna-Barbera	Tom and Jerry	Animated	MGM
Uncivil War Birds	Jules White	The Three Stooges	Short subject	Columbia
Walky Talky Hawky	Robert McKimson		Animated	Warner Bros.

== See also ==
- 1946 in the United States
