= Cracked Nuts =

Cracked Nuts may refer to:

- Cracked Nuts (1931 film), an American pre-Code comedy film directed by Edward F. Cline
- Cracked Nuts (1941 film), an American comedy film directed by Edward F. Cline, unrelated to the 1931 film
