= Francis Pierlot =

American actor (1875–1955)

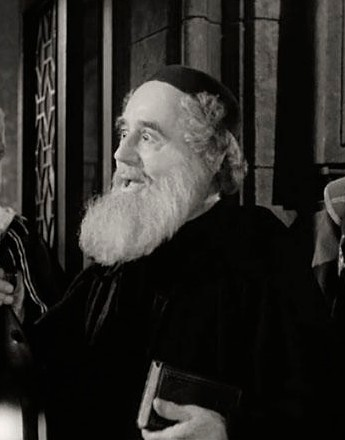
- Pierlot in Cyrano de Bergerac (1950)
- Born: July 15, 1875; Boston, Massachusetts, U.S.
- Died: May 11, 1955 (aged 79); Hollywood, California, U.S.
- Resting place: Forest Lawn Memorial Park, Glendale, California
- Occupation: Actor
- Years active: 1914–1953

Francis Pierlot (July 15, 1875 – May 11, 1955 ) was a stage and film actor with over 90 film credits between 1914 and 1953.

== Early years ==
Pierlot was born in Boston. His ancestor, also named Francis Pierlot, was a comedian who was popular at the Opera Comique, and his grandmother sang light opera on the French stage. Pierlot himself was first associated with the theater when, at age 8, he became an usher in the Boston Grand Opera House. From that job he progressed to being a messenger for the manager of the Old Globe Theater in Boston, after which he became a ticket seller. When he was 17, he organized some amatuers into an entertainment troupe that performed in Boston and the surrounding area.

== Career ==
Much of Pierlot's early career was spent in stock theater and vaudeville.

His first film credit was in 1914, but he did not begin appearing in films full-time until 1940, when he was 63 years old. He specialized in playing grey-haired well dressed characters in small parts including judges, priests and lawyers. One of Pierlot's larger roles was as Jean Simmons' manservant in his final film, the biblical epic The Robe (1953).

Pierlot's Broadway debut occurred in Please Get Married (1919).

== Legal problem ==
In August 1909 Pierlot was accused of having crossed state lines with a 16-year-old girl. The police chief in Minneapolis asked Boston authorities to be on the lookout for Pierlot, who was thought to be accompanied by the girl, who was from Minneapolis and was said to have "become enamored of the actor". Pierlot had left a troupe in Minneapolis to join a company in Boston. While the alert was active, a rumor circulated that the girl had returned to her family.

== Death ==
Pierlot died on May 11, 1955, in Hollywood, California, at age 79. He was buried in Forest Lawn Memorial Park, Glendale, California.

== Partial filmography ==
- The Path Forbidden (1914) - Bug Hicks
- The Night Angel (1931) - Jan
- Escape to Glory (1940) - Professor Mudge
- The Captain Is a Lady (1940) - Roger Bartlett
- Strike Up the Band (1940) - Mr. Judd
- Always a Bride (1940) - Pete Bond
- Victory (1940) - McKenzie (uncredited)
- The Trial of Mary Dugan (1941) - John Masters
- Cracked Nuts (1941) - Mayor Wilfred Smun
- International Lady (1941) - Dr. Rowan
- Public Enemies (1941) - Priest
- Rise and Shine (1941) - Prof. Schnauzer (uncredited)
- Remember the Day (1941) - Mr. Steele
- A Gentleman at Heart (1942) - Appleby
- Yankee Doodle Dandy (1942) - Dr. Anderson (uncredited)
- Just Off Broadway (1942) - Sidney Arno
- Henry Aldrich, Editor (1942) - Nero Smith
- Night Monster (1942) - Dr. Phipps
- My Heart Belongs to Daddy (1942) - Dr. Mitchell
- Edge of Darkness (1943) - Tailor (uncredited)
- Mission to Moscow (1943) - Doctor (uncredited)
- Stage Door Canteen (1943) - Minister at Jersey's Wedding (uncredited)
- You're a Lucky Fellow, Mr. Smith (1943) - Doc Webster
- The North Star (1943) - Wounded Townsman (uncredited)
- Mystery Broadcast (1943) - Crunch
- Madame Curie (1943) - Monsieur Michaud (uncredited)
- Uncertain Glory (1944) - Father La Borde - Prison Priest
- The Adventures of Mark Twain (1944) - Paige (uncredited)
- Bathing Beauty (1944) - Professor Hendricks
- The Hairy Ape (1944) - Señor Cutler (uncredited)
- The Doughgirls (1944) - Mr. Jordan
- The Very Thought of You (1944) - Minister Raymond Houck
- Grissly's Millions (1945) - Dr. Benny
- Roughly Speaking (1945) - Dr. Lewis (uncredited)
- A Tree Grows in Brooklyn (1945) - Priest at Funeral (uncredited)
- The Affairs of Susan (1945) - Uncle Jemmy
- The Horn Blows at Midnight (1945) - Heavenly Personnel Manager Mercurius (uncredited)
- I Live in Grosvenor Square (1945) - Postman
- Bewitched (1945) - Dr. George Wilton
- The Hidden Eye (1945) - Kossovsky
- Our Vines Have Tender Grapes (1945) - Minister
- Yolanda and the Thief (1945) - Padre
- Hit the Hay (1945) - Roger Barton
- Life with Blondie (1945) - Simon Rutledge (uncredited)
- How Doooo You Do!!! (1945) - Proprietor
- Fear (1946) - Prof. Stanley
- Dragonwyck (1946) - Dr. Brown (uncredited)
- The Catman of Paris (1946) - Paul Audet
- The Walls Came Tumbling Down (1946) - Father Walsh (uncredited)
- Two Guys from Milwaukee (1946) - Dr. Bauer
- G.I. War Brides (1946) - Mr. Wunderlich
- Crime Doctor's Man Hunt (1946) - Gerald Cotter
- The Strange Woman (1946) - Dr. Bailey (uncredited)
- The Show-Off (1946) - Judge Ederman (uncredited)
- Cigarette Girl (1947) - Pervis
- The Late George Apley (1947) - Wilson (uncredited)
- Philo Vance's Gamble (1947) - Roberts the Butler
- Moss Rose (1947) - Train Conductor (uncredited)
- The Trespasser (1947) - Channing Bliss, the Publisher
- Second Chance (1947) - J.L. Montclaire
- Song of Love (1947) - Old Musician (uncredited)
- The Senator Was Indiscreet (1947) - Frank
- Mr. Reckless (1948) - Rev. Stanislaus (uncredited)
- State of the Union (1948) - Josephs - Newspaper Editor (uncredited)
- I, Jane Doe (1948) - Father Martin
- The Dude Goes West (1948) - Mr. Brittle
- The Babe Ruth Story (1948) - Brother Peter (uncredited)
- A Date with Judy (1948) - Professor Green (uncredited)
- Beyond Glory (1948) - Mr. Charles—Rocky's Boss (uncredited)
- The Loves of Carmen (1948) - Beggar (uncredited)
- That Lady in Ermine (1948) - Priest (uncredited)
- That Wonderful Urge (1948) - Barret (uncredited)
- The Accused (1949) - Dr. Vinson
- Chicken Every Sunday (1949) - Charlie Blaine (uncredited)
- Bad Boy (1949) - Mr. Pardee (uncredited)
- Take One False Step (1949) - Doctor Watson
- My Friend Irma (1949) - Taxman (uncredited)
- Undertow (1949) - Husband at Reno Bar (uncredited)
- The Flame and the Arrow (1950) - Papa Pietro
- Copper Canyon (1950) - Moss Balfour
- Cyrano de Bergerac (1950) - Capuchin friar
- The Lemon Drop Kid (1951) - Henry Regan
- That's My Boy (1951) - Henry Baker
- Savage Drums (1951) - Aruna
- Anne of the Indies (1951) - Herkimer
- The Man with a Cloak (1951) - Pharmacist (uncredited)
- Hoodlum Empire (1952) - Uncle Jean (uncredited)
- Hold That Line (1952) - A.J. Billingsley
- The Prisoner of Zenda (1952) - Josef
- It Happens Every Thursday (1953) - Loomis (uncredited)
- The Robe (1953) - Dodinius (uncredited)
