= Cracked Nuts (1941 film) =

1941 film

- Theatrical release poster
- Directed by: Edward F. Cline
- Screenplay by: Erna Lazarus; Scott Darling
- Produced by: Joseph G. Sanford
- Starring: Stuart Erwin; Una Merkel; Mischa Auer; William Frawley; Shemp Howard; Astrid Allwyn
- Cinematography: Charles Van Enger
- Edited by: Milton Carruth
- Production company: Universal Pictures
- Distributed by: Universal Pictures
- Release date: August 1, 1941
- Running time: 61 minutes
- Country: United States
- Language: English

Cracked Nuts is a 1941 American comedy film directed by Edward F. Cline and written by Erna Lazarus and Scott Darling. The film stars Stuart Erwin, Una Merkel, Mischa Auer, William Frawley, Shemp Howard and Astrid Allwyn. It was released on August 1, 1941, by Universal Pictures. The film is unrelated Wheeler & Woolsey film of 1931 by the same title, although Cline directed both films.

== Plot ==
Lawrence Trent is a small-town goofball who wins $5,000 in a radio contest. He plans to use the money to marry his sweetheart, but is instead conned into investing it in a phony robot scheme by Boris Kabikoff, whose prototype is actually his partner in a robot suit. When he discovers that he has been swindled, Lawrence tries to recover his money.

== Cast ==
- Stuart Erwin as Lawrence Trent
- Una Merkel as Sharon Knight
- Mischa Auer as Boris Kabikoff
- William Frawley as James Mitchell
- Shemp Howard as Eddie / Ivan
- Astrid Allwyn as Ethel Mitchell
- Ernie Stanton as Ivan the Robot
- Mantan Moreland as Burgess
- Hattie Noel as Chloe
- Francis Pierlot as Mayor Wilfred Smun
- Will Wright as Sylvanus Boogle
- Emmett Vogan as Mr. McAneny
- Tom Hanlon as Dixon
- Pat O'Malley as Officer #1
