= Apache Chief (film) =

1949 film

- Film poster
- Directed by: Frank McDonald
- Screenplay by: George D. Green; Leonard S. Picker
- Produced by: Leonard S. Picker
- Starring: Alan Curtis; Tom Neal; Russell Hayden; Carol Thurston; Fuzzy Knight
- Cinematography: Benjamin H. Kline (as Benjamin Kline)
- Edited by: Stanley Frazen
- Music by: Albert Glasser
- Production company: Lippert Pictures
- Distributed by: Screen Guild Productions
- Release date: November 4, 1949 (U.S.)
- Running time: 60 minutes
- Country: United States
- Language: English

Apache Chief is a 1949 American Western film directed by Frank McDonald and starring Alan Curtis, Tom Neal, Russell Hayden, Carol Thurston and Fuzzy Knight.

== Premise ==
A Native American chief is against his tribesmen killing white settlers. To keep the peace he must firstly deal with renegade Apache Black Wolf.

== Cast ==
- Alan Curtis as Young Eagle
- Tom Neal as Lt. Brown
- Russell Hayden as Black Wolf
- Carol Thurston as Watona
- Fuzzy Knight as Nevada Smith
- Trevor Bardette as Chief Big Crow
- Francis McDonald as Mohaska
- Ted Hecht as Pani
- Alan Wells as Lame Bull
- William Wilkerson as Grey Cloud (as Billy Wilkerson)
- Rodd Redwing as Tewa (as Roderic Redwing)
