= Marcelle Corday =

Belgian-American actress (1890–1971)

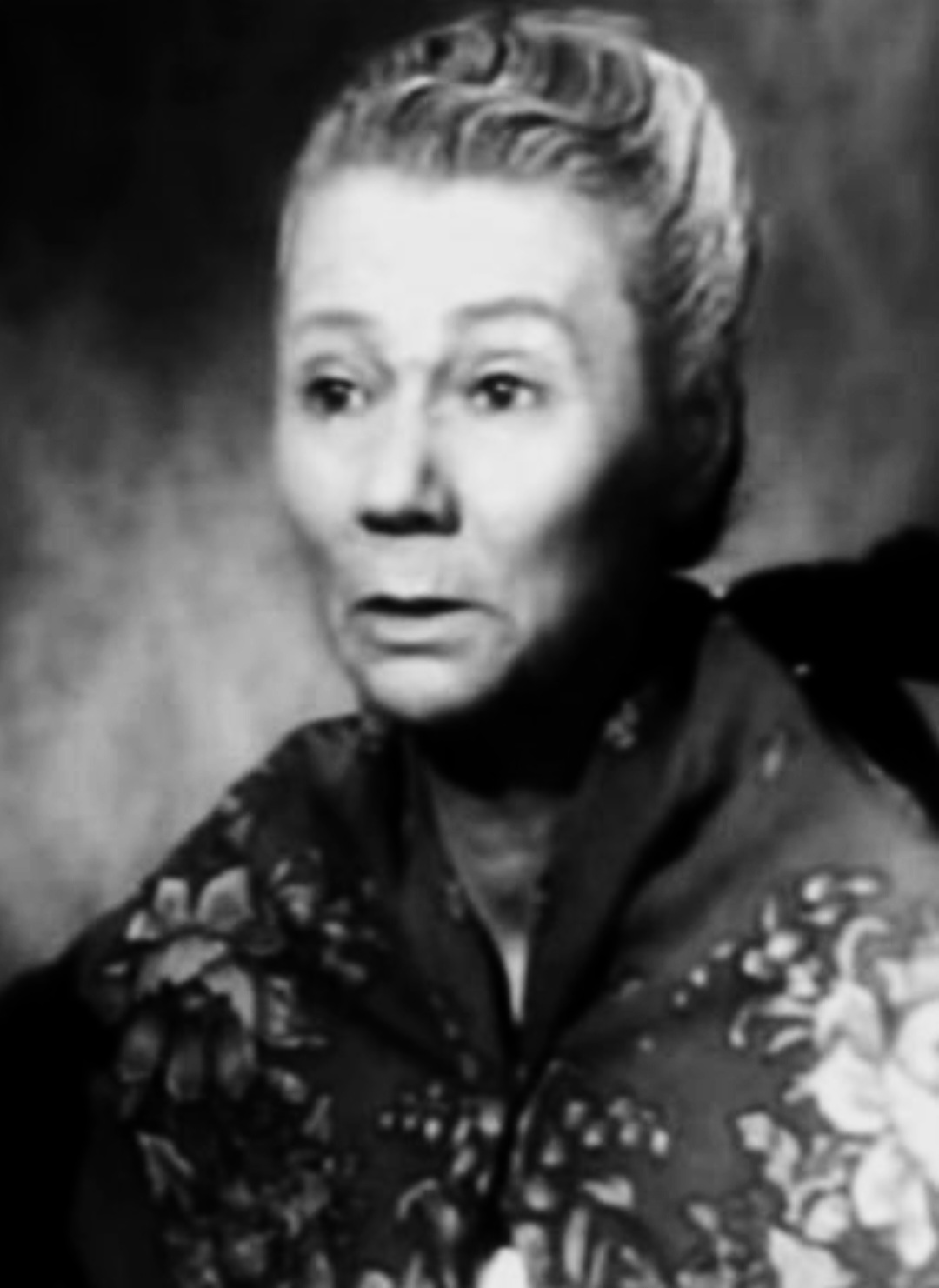
- Corday in Swamp Fire (1946)
- Born: 8 January 1890; Brussels, Belgium
- Died: 25 June 1971 (aged 81); Newport Beach, California, U.S.
- Occupation: Actress
- Years active: 1925–1952
- Relatives: Eugène Ysaÿe (uncle)

Marcelle Corday (8 January 1890 – 25 June 1971) was a Belgian-born American actress. She mostly played character parts in silent and sound films.

== Biography ==
Born in Brussels, Belgium, in 1890, Corday was a niece of violinist Eugène Ysaÿe. She learned to play violin and piano, studying at the Conservatoire de Paris and was a concert pianist until she fell and broke her arm. After that injury, she turned her attention to acting. She acted in Paris with the Vieux Colombier company, headed by Jacques Copeau. She came to New York with that troupe in 1917 and remained in the United States when its engagements ended. Not limited to English-speaking roles, Corday acted in Dutch, French, German, and Italian. In the 1920–21 season, she acted with Ethel Barrymore in Declassee.

Corday moved to California in 1923 and began working in films thereafter. Officially, her American film career began in 1925, but it is claimed she had a small uncredited role in Fred Niblo's 1924 film, The Red Lily, where she was menaced by Dick Sutherland in a bar.

In December 1948, Corday retired from films and moved with her husband to Hawaii. There she worked with the Honolulu Community Theater. She died at age 81 on 25 June 1971 in Newport Beach, California.

== Partial filmography ==
- Lost: A Wife (1925)
- We Moderns (1925)
- The Splendid Crime (1926)
- The Greater Glory (1926)
- Into Her Kingdom (1926)
- The Scarlet Letter (1926)
- Flesh and the Devil (1926)
- Jim, the Conqueror (1926)
- When a Man Loves (1927)
- Quality Street (1927)
- Dry Martini (1928)
- Lingerie (1928)
- The Trespasser (1929)
- They Had to See Paris (1929)
- Midnight Mystery (1930)
- Blonde Venus (1932)
- The Barbarian (1933)
- The Great Ziegfeld (1936)
- Dead End (1937)
- A Yank on the Burma Road (1942)
- Swamp Fire (1946)
