= The Strange Woman (1946 film) =

1946 film by Edgar George Ulmer

- Theatrical release poster
- Directed by: Edgar G. Ulmer
- Written by: Hunt Stromberg; Edgar G. Ulmer
- Screenplay by: Herb Meadow
- Based on: The Strange Woman; 1941 novel by Ben Ames Williams
- Produced by: Hedy Lamarr; Jack Chertok; Eugen Schüfftan
- Starring: Hedy Lamarr; George Sanders; Louis Hayward
- Cinematography: Lucien N. Andriot
- Edited by: John M. Foley; Richard G. Wray
- Music by: Carmen Dragon
- Production companies: Hunt Stromberg Productions; Mars Film Corporation
- Distributed by: United Artists
- Release date: October 25, 1946 (United States)
- Running time: 100 minutes
- Country: United States
- Language: English
- Budget: $1.5 million
- Box office: $2.8 million (US rentals)

The Strange Woman is a 1946 American historical melodrama film directed by Edgar G. Ulmer and starring Hedy Lamarr, George Sanders and Louis Hayward. It is based on the 1941 novel of the same title by Ben Ames Williams. The screenplay was written by Ulmer and Hunt Stromberg. Originally released by United Artists, the film is now in the public domain.

== Plot ==
In Bangor, Maine in 1824, a cruel young girl named Jenny Hager pushes a terrified Ephraim Poster into a river knowing he cannot swim. She is prepared to let him drown until Judge Saladine happens by, at which point Jenny jumps into the water and takes credit for saving the boy's life.

Several years later, Jenny has grown up to be a beautiful but heartless and manipulative young woman. Her father, an abusive, drunken widower, whips Jenny after learning of her flirtation with a sailor. She secretly schemes to wed the richest man in town, the much older timber baron Isaiah Poster, while his mild-mannered son Ephraim is away at college in Cambridge, Massachusetts.

Isaiah is unkind to Ephraim upon Ephraim's return. He is unaware that the boy and Jenny (now Isaiah's wife) were once sweethearts and that Jenny is again flirting with Ephraim behind his back. Isaiah is more concerned about the local lawlessness, with lumberjacks drunkenly pillaging the town, manhandling the women and killing the judge, confirming Isaiah's long-held belief that Bangor must organize a police force.

When Isaiah falls ill, Jenny secretly hopes that her husband will die. After he recovers, Isaiah decides to make a trip to his lumber camps. Jenny appeals to Ephraim to arrange his father's death, saying, "I want you to return alone." In the rapids, both men fall from an overturned canoe and Isaiah drowns. His son, still deathly afraid of water, is unable or unwilling to save him.

Ephraim returns, with Jenny telling him "You can't come into this house, you wretched coward...You've killed your father." He becomes a hopeless drunk, hating her and speaking freely about her deceitful ways. Isaiah's superintendent in the timber business, John Evered, goes to confront Ephraim but is not sure whether to believe the harsh words he hears about Jenny.

Jenny seduces Evered, who is engaged to marry her best friend, Meg Saladine, the judge's daughter. Jenny and Evered find that Ephraim has hanged himself. Lust overtakes them during a thunderstorm. After their wedding, Evered is eager to have children, but Jenny learns she cannot bear any. She confesses this to her new husband after some delay, fearful of his rejection of her, but to Jenny's relief, Evered wholeheartedly affirms his love.

A traveling evangelist, Lincoln Pettridge, preaches a sermon of fire and brimstone that results in Jenny's searing confession to her husband that all Ephraim had said about her was true. Evered goes off to be by himself at a lumber camp, and Jenny learns that Meg has gone to see Evered there. In the cabin, knowing of his love for Jenny, Meg tells him to go back to his wife. Jenny arrives at the cabin and, seeing them together, frantically whips her horse, bearing down on them with her carriage. It hits a rock, careens off a cliff and Jenny is mortally wounded. Her dying words are an expression of her passionate feelings for Evered, who has let her know true love.

== Cast ==
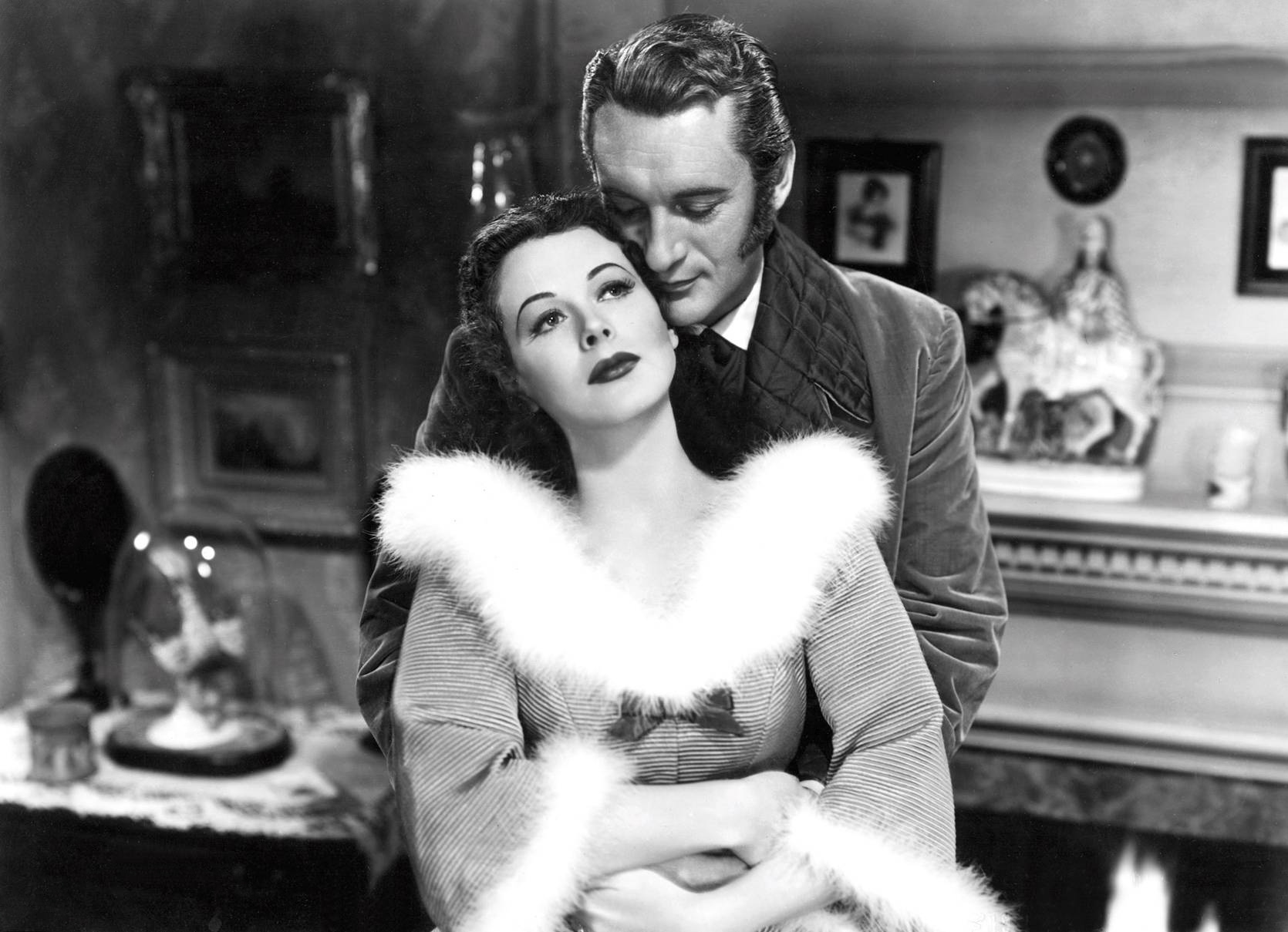
Hedy Lamarr and George Sanders in The Strange Woman

- Hedy Lamarr as Jenny Hager
- George Sanders as John Evered
- Louis Hayward as Ephraim Poster
- Gene Lockhart as Isaiah Poster
- Hillary Brooke as Meg Saladine
- Rhys Williams as Deacon Adams
- June Storey as Lena Tempest
- Moroni Olsen as Rev. Thatcher
- Olive Blakeney as Mrs. Hollis
- Kathleen Lockhart as Mrs. Partridge
- Alan Napier as Judge Henry Saladine
- Dennis Hoey as Tim Hager
- Ray Teal as Duncan (uncredited)
- Jo Ann Marlowe as young Jenny (uncredited)

== Production ==
The production dates were from December 10, 1945, to mid-March 1946 at the Samuel Goldwyn Studios. Hedy Lamarr and Jack Chertok formed a partnership to produce this film. Production on the film was shut down between December 13, 1945, and January 3, 1946, due to Lamarr contracting influenza.

The film's sets were designed by the art director Nicolai Remisoff.

The film went over budget by $1 million but was a moderate success at the box office.

Douglas Sirk directed, uncredited, the opening sequence with Jenny Hager as a child: executive producer Hunt Stromberg declared his dissatisfaction with the original footage of Ulmer's own daughter Arianné playing the young Jenny – she was purportedly not nasty enough – so he and Hedy Lamarr enlisted Sirk to reshoot the scenes using Jo Ann Marlowe, who had appeared in Sirk's own A Scandal in Paris earlier that year, and who had also featured as Joan Crawford's daughter Kay in Michael Curtiz' Mildred Pierce.

== See also ==
- Public domain film
- List of American films of 1946
- List of films in the public domain in the United States
