= Swamp Fire =

1946 film by William H. Pine

- Directed by: William H. Pine
- Screenplay by: Daniel Mainwaring; (as Geoffrey Homes)
- Produced by: L.B. Merman
- Starring: Johnny Weissmuller
- Cinematography: Fred Jackman, Jr.
- Edited by: Henry Adams
- Music by: Rudy Schrager
- Production company: Pine-Thomas Productions
- Distributed by: Paramount Pictures
- Release dates: August 24, 1946 (New York City); September 6, 1946 (United States)
- Running time: 69 minutes
- Country: United States
- Language: English

Swamp Fire is a 1946 American adventure film directed by William H. Pine and starring Johnny Weissmuller. The film pits two screen Tarzans against each other in their first film for Pine-Thomas Productions.

== Plot ==
After World War Two, Johnny Duval returns home to the bayous of Louisiana where he was a U.S. Coast Guard bar pilot. However, after serving in the Coast Guard, Johnny is affected by stress from losing the destroyer escort under his command, blaming himself for the loss of the ship that was torpedoed. Initially Johnny refuses to take up his old piloting duties, offering to work as an ordinary seaman but he is tricked into filling in for a pilot and does an admirable job where he regains his confidence.

In the meantime, Johnny is distracted from his bride to be, Toni Rousseau by the visit of a spoiled rich city girl Janet Hilton whose father P.T. Hilton buys up land in the bayous and posts the areas for no hunting or fishing which results in devastating effects to the local culture. Local hot head and Johnny's rival Mike Kalavich knocks down the Hilton's signs and goes poaching on their land.

== Cast ==
- Johnny Weissmuller as Johnny Duval
- Virginia Grey as Janet Hilton
- Buster Crabbe as Mike Kalavich
- Carol Thurston as Toni Rousseau
- Pedro de Cordoba as Tim Rousseau
- Marcelle Corday as Grandmere Rousseau
- William Edmunds as Emile Ledoux
- Edwin Maxwell as Capt. Pierre Moise
- Pierre Watkin as P.T. Hilton
- Charles Gordon as Capt. Hal Peyton
- Frank Fenton as Capt. Pete Dailey
- David Janssen as Emile's Eldest Son (uncredited)

== Production ==
The film was meant to be the first of a three-picture deal between Weissmuller and Pine-Thomas Productions which was signed in February 1944. He was going to make Combat Correspondent about a war correspondent in the South Pacific, and a musical Western. However Weissmuller only made one film for the company.

Filming was to have started on 10 April 1945 but was delayed until October.

Weissmuller was paid $75,000 for the role.

== See also ==
- List of American films of 1946
- Public domain film
- List of films in the public domain in the United States
