= Showdown (1963 film) =

1963 film by R. G. Springsteen

- Directed by: R. G. Springsteen
- Written by: Ric Hardman (as Bronson Howitzer)
- Produced by: Gordon Kay
- Starring: Audie Murphy; Kathleen Crowley; Charles Drake
- Cinematography: Ellis W. Carter
- Edited by: Jerome Thoms
- Music by: Hans J. Salter
- Color process: Black and white
- Production company: Universal Pictures
- Distributed by: Universal Pictures
- Release date: May 3, 1963
- Running time: 79 minutes
- Country: United States
- Language: English
- Budget: $500,000

Showdown is a 1963 American Western film directed by R. G. Springsteen and starring Audie Murphy, Kathleen Crowley and Charles Drake. It was originally known as The Iron Collar.

== Plot ==
Two cowboys, Chris Foster and Bert Pickett, go into town to cash their paychecks. Bert gets in a fight after getting drunk and involves Chris. Bert and Chris are put in iron collars, chained to a killer, LaValle. They manage to escape with La Valle's gang, though still wearing their iron collars. During the course of the escape, Bert picks up some negotiable bonds which he hopes to cash once he and Chris escape from LaValle. But LaValle discovers that Bert is holding the bonds. Since no one in his gang can cash them, he holds Chris and demands that Bert go into the nearest town to cash them and bring back the money, or Chris will be killed.

== Cast ==
- Audie Murphy as Chris Foster
- Kathleen Crowley as Estelle
- Charles Drake as Bert Pickett
- Harold J. Stone as LaValle
- Skip Homeier as Caslon
- L. Q. Jones as Foray
- Strother Martin as Charlie Reeder
- John McKee as Marshal Beaudine
- Henry Wills as Chaca
- Joe Haworth as Guard
- Kevin Brodie as Buster
- Carol Thurston as Smithy's wife
- Dabbs Greer as Express Man

== Production ==
Showdown was shot in black and white to save money, which infuriated Murphy. Producer Gordon Kay said that the film earned no less than did other Murphy films of the period.

== See also ==
- List of American films of 1963
