= San Diego, I Love You =

1944 American comedy film directed by Reginald LeBorg

- Directed by: Reginald LeBorg
- Written by: Richard Bransten; Michael Fessier; Ruth McKenney; Ernest Pagano
- Produced by: Michael Fessier; Ernest Pagano
- Starring: Jon Hall; Louise Allbritton; Edward Everett Horton
- Cinematography: Hal Mohr
- Edited by: Charles Maynard
- Music by: Hans J. Salter
- Production company: Universal Pictures
- Distributed by: Universal Pictures
- Release date: September 29, 1944
- Running time: 83 minutes
- Country: United States
- Language: English

San Diego, I Love You is a 1944 American comedy film directed by Reginald LeBorg and starring Jon Hall, Louise Allbritton and Edward Everett Horton.

The screenwriters for the film included Ruth McKenney, author of My Sister Eileen (1938) Silent screen stars Buster Keaton and Irene Ryan, the latter known for her role in the TV sit-com Beverly Hillbillies, appear in supporting roles.

The film was a surprise hit at the box office.

== Plot ==
Philip McCooley, a widowed high school teacher in small-town California, believes that he has discovered a new self-inflating life raft. He is persuaded by his elder daughter Virginia to travel to San Diego to apply for funds from a developmental agency, and takes his four young sons along as well. On the train journey they encounter and offend John Thompson Caldwell IV by taking his compartment, little realizing that he is extremely wealthy and the head of the agency that the McCooley's need the support of. With their last savings, the family buy a house in the city, which comes with an unusual butler and a very confused lodger.

After Caldwell dismisses McCooley's invention, his daughter forces herself into his company to convince him otherwise. Although at first he resists her approaches, they gradually fall in love as they both come to appreciate the attractions of San Diego. Caldwell is persuaded to give the invention a second look. While McCooley's life raft ultimately proves to be both useless and dangerous, he has unwittingly invented a very destructive explosive which can be used by the War Department.

== Cast ==
- Jon Hall as John Thompson Caldwell IV
- Louise Allbritton as Virginia McCooley
- Edward Everett Horton as Philip McCooley
- Eric Blore as Nelson, the Butler
- Buster Keaton as Bus Driver
- Irene Ryan as Sheila Jones
- Rudy Wissler as Walter McCooley
- Peter Miles as Joel McCooley
- Charles Bates as Larry McCooley
- Donald Davis as Pete McCooley
- Florence Lake as Miss Lake
- Chester Clute as Percy Caldwell
- Sarah Selby as Mrs. Lovelace
- Fern Emmett as Mrs. Callope
- Harry Barris as Clarinetist
- Leon Belasco as Violinist
- Hobart Cavanaugh as Mr. McGregor
- William B. Davidson as General
- Vernon Dent as Mr. Fitzmaurice
- Eddie Dunn as Stevedore
- Mabel Forrest as Mrs. Fresher
- John Gannon as Soldier
- Edward Gargan as Policeman
- Victoria Horne as Mrs. Allsop
- Esther Howard as Mother
- Teddy Infuhr as Brat
- Tom Keene as Reporter
- George Lloyd as Moving Man
- Matt McHugh as Man on Street
- George Meader as Mr. Applewaite
- Clarence Muse as Porter
- Sarah Padden as Mrs. Gulliver
- Jack Rice as Hotel Clerk
- Dewey Robinson as Stevedore
- Gene Roth as Stevedore
- Almira Sessions as Mrs. Mainwaring
- Jerry Shane as Sailor
- Harry Tyler as Mr. Carruthers
- Jan Wiley as Receptionist

== Reception ==
Critic Bosley Crowther of the New York Times rebukes Universal Pictures for issuing a "jerry-built latter-day farce," resorting to "screw-ball clichés" and "mirthless slapstick resulting in a "painful attempt to be funny."

Performances by Louise Allbritton, Jon Hall, and Edward Everett Horton are described as "embarrassing," "worse than terrible," and "feeble" respectively. Buster Keaton's cameo as a bus driver makes a "mockery" of the iconic silent film comedian. Crowther ranks the production with "squirrel-nourishment."

Writing in The Nation in 1944, critic James Agee stated, "San Diego I Love You is a coarse-weft, easygoing little farce ... I can't exactly recommend it, but if you see it by accident it will cause no particular pain."

== Retrospective appraisal ==
Film critic Barry Chapman of the Toronto Film Society reports that San Diego, I Love You is regarded as the director's "best film." LeBorg acknowledged it as his own favorite work.

Chapman reserves high praise for the cast performances, in particular Louise Allbritton, achieving "her top comedian effort to date" and exhibiting "a fine sense of comic timing" that served her well in screwball comedy.

The studio resources provided for San Diego, I Love You appeared to be promising for LeBorg's prospects as a director, with an "ambitious script" and a budget that reached the threshold for a high production feature.

Though the film was "engaging and deftly handled," biographer Wheeler Winston Dixon reports that distribution and publicity were lacking, and did not perform to studio expectations. A top-ranked screen star might added luster to the film's prestige and earned higher box office returns - LeBorg had expressed an interest in procuring Cary Grant for the role of John Thompson Caldwell IV. Disappointed, Universal consigned LeBorg to his former low-budget "B" projects.

In an April 7, 1988 screening and talk at the University of Nebraska–Lincoln Film Studies Program, LeBorg was skeptical that the 150-person audience, mostly students, would appreciate I Love You, San Diego. Despite the fact that those in attendance "laughed and applauded" upon viewing the comedy, he cynically insisted that one of his horror films would have garnered a better reception.

== Sources ==
- Chapman, Barry. San Diego, I Love You (1944). Toronto Film Society. October 21, 2020. https://torontofilmsociety.com/san-diego-i-love-you-1944/ Retrieved 28 July 2024.
- Crowther, Bosley. 1944. THE SCREEN; Struggle for Laughs. New York Times, November 10, 1944. https://www.nytimes.com/1944/11/10/archives/the-screen-struggle-for-laughs.html Retrieved 27 July 2024.
- Robert McLaughlin. We'll Always Have the Movies: American Cinema during World War II. University Press of Kentucky, 2006.
- Dixon, Wheeler Winston. 1992. The Films of Reginald LeBorg: Interviews, Essays, and Filmography. Filmmakers No. 31 The Scarecrow Press, Metuchen, New Jersey. ISBN 0-8108-2550-3
