= Jo Ann Marlowe =

American actress (1935–1991)

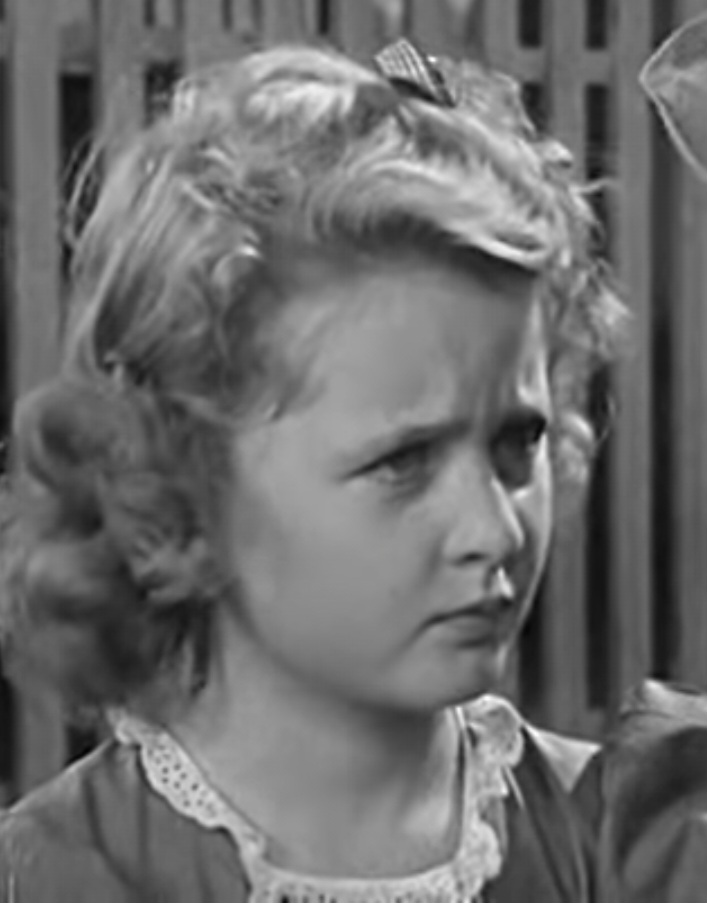
- Marlowe in Rolling Home (1946)
- Born: December 15, 1935; Schuyler, Nebraska, U.S.
- Died: January 2, 1991 (aged 55); Los Angeles, California, U.S.
- Resting place: San Fernando Mission Cemetery
- Occupation: Actress
- Years active: 1942–1950
- Spouse: John F. Dunne (m. 1960; div. 1968)
- Children: 1

Jo Ann Marlowe (born Jo Anne Mares Dunne; December 15, 1935 – January 2, 1991) was an American child actress. She was first discovered by a Hollywood director around four years old while on a family trip to Los Angeles. Her talent landed her roles in films such as Mildred Pierce (1945) and A Scandal in Paris (1946). Despite receiving scholarship offers for drama schools, Marlowe's mother declined, opting to follow studio advice.

Later transitioning from acting to law after adolescence, Marlowe studied at Loyola Marymount University, eventually becoming a chief trial lawyer in Los Angeles. Her impressive success rate in the courtroom attracted the attention of the FBI, who sought her expertise in managing their cases.

In her early thirties, she suffered a cerebral hemorrhage which brought on a coma that lasted for 22 years. She died in January 1991 in Los Angeles, California.

== Career ==
=== Early career ===
Marlowe was born Jo Anne Mares Dunne, to parents Edward and Theora in Schuyler, Nebraska. Around the age of four, she caught the eye of a Hollywood director while on a trip to Los Angeles with her parents. Recognizing something special in her, the director arranged for her to meet his associates, leading to an unexpected audition on a movie set for the film Money and the Woman.

In May 1939, the family returned to their home after their vacation, but decided to relocate to Hollywood later that year. Marlowe's early years in the industry involved joining a tap dancing class, which eventually led to an audition and her debut in the 1942 film Yankee Doodle Dandy. As was common practice, Marlowe adopted a stage name.

=== Later career ===
Having settled in California during the early 1940s, she featured in numerous post-war films, such as the 1945 film Roughly Speaking. Despite receiving numerous scholarship offers for drama schools, her mother, guided by studio advice, declined them. Marlowe gained attention as the youngest pin-up girl in Hollywood and even earned the title of Little Miss America when aged five.

Around 1946, she secured the lead role in the film Little Iodine following an extensive casting process. Producers spent months watching various screen tests and conducting many interviews before discovering Marlowe, who had recently completed the film Mildred Pierce as the younger daughter of Joan Crawford. She was commended for her ability to ad-lib, demonstrated during an audition for a film, where having forgot the lines, improvised her own in-keeping with the story, which contributed towards her securing the role. As she transitioned into adolescence, she encountered challenges in finding acting opportunities and eventually decided to retire from the industry.

After leaving acting, Marlowe pursued higher education, studying law at Loyola Marymount University, where she earned a degree. She later became a chief trial lawyer in Los Angeles and enjoyed a high case success rate, attracting interest from the FBI to manage their cases.

== Personal life ==
Marlowe married lawyer John F. Dunne. They had a daughter, Kimberly. A talented litigator herself, Marlowe was Chief Trial Lawyer for the U.S. Attorney's Office in Los Angeles. In her early 30s, she suffered a cerebral hemorrhage related to injuries sustained in an auto accident. She remained in a coma for the rest of her life.

She died in January 1991 in Los Angeles, California, at her mother's home following her 22-year coma. She was buried in San Fernando Mission Cemetery.

== Filmography ==
- Yankee Doodle Dandy (1942) as Josie Cohan - Age 6 (uncredited)
- Stars on Parade (1944) as O'Rourke Child (uncredited)
- Roughly Speaking (1945) as Louise Jr. - Ages 5-6 (uncredited)
- Dangerous Intruder (1945) as Jackie
- Mildred Pierce (1945) as Kay Pierce
- A Scandal in Paris (1946) as Mimi De Pierremont
- Joe Palooka, Champ (1946) as Rosie Palooka (as Jo Ann Marlow)
- Man from Rainbow Valley (1946) as Ginny Hale
- Night and Day (1946) as Tina (uncredited)
- Of Human Bondage (1946) as Athelny Child (uncredited)
- Little Iodine (1946) as Little Iodine
- The Strange Woman (1946) as Jenny - as a Girl (uncredited)
- Rolling Home (1946) as Sandy Crawford (as Jo Anne Marlowe)
- Keeper of the Bees (1947) as Little Scout - The Orphan
- Never a Dull Moment (1950) as Sister (uncredited)
