= Savage Drums =

1951 film directed by William A. Berke

- Directed by: William Berke
- Screenplay by: Fenton Earnshaw
- Produced by: William Berke
- Starring: Sabu; Lita Baron; Sid Melton; H.B. Warner; Steven Geray; Robert Easton; Margia Dean; Francis Pierlot; Ray Kinney; Paul Marion
- Cinematography: Jack Greenhalgh, A.S.C.
- Edited by: Carl Pierson, A.C.E.
- Music by: Darrell Calker
- Production companies: Tom Productions, Inc.
- Distributed by: Lippert Pictures, Inc.
- Release date: June 22, 1951
- Running time: 73 minutes
- Country: United States
- Language: English

Savage Drums is a 1951 American adventure film produced and directed by William Berke, starring Sabu, Lita Baron, Sid Melton and H.B. Warner and released by Poverty Row studio Lippert Pictures.

== Plot ==
Tipo, born into the royal family of an island in the South China Sea, lives in the United States and is training for a boxing championship. Upon learning that his native land is in danger of falling to communists, he reluctantly abandons his boxing career, returns home to defeat the enemy, claim his rightful place as king, marry his childhood sweetheart and sign a treaty with the United States Navy to build airport runways, roads and a harbor.

== Cast ==
- Sabu as Tipo
- Lita Baron as Sari
- H.B. Warner as Maou
- Sid Melton as Jimmy
- Steven Geray as Borodoff
- Bob Easton as Max
- Margia Dean as Tania
- Francis Pierlot as Aruna
- Paul Marion as Rata
- Ray Kinney as Rami
- John Mansfield as John
- Edward Clark as Tabuana
- Hugh Beaumont as Bill Fenton (uncredited)

== Bibliography ==
- Davis, Blair. The Battle for the Bs: 1950s Hollywood and the Rebirth of Low-Budget Cinema. Rutgers University Press, 2012.
