= Keeper of the Bees (1947 film) =

1947 American drama film directed by John Sturges

- Original Theatrical Poster
- Directed by: John Sturges
- Written by: Malcolm Stuart Boylan; Ralph Rose Jr. Gene Stratton-Porter; Lawrence E. Watkin
- Produced by: John Haggott
- Starring: Michael Duane; Gloria Henry; Harry Davenport; Jane Darwell; Jo Ann Marlowe
- Cinematography: Henry Freulich
- Edited by: James Sweeney
- Music by: Paul Sawtell
- Color process: Black and white
- Production company: Columbia Pictures
- Distributed by: Columbia Pictures
- Release date: July 10, 1947
- Running time: 68 minutes
- Country: United States
- Language: English

Keeper of the Bees is a 1947 American drama film directed by John Sturges. It was based on the novel by the same name, written by Gene Stratton-Porter. The film was shot over three weeks. Keeper of the Bees (1947) is the third film adaption of the novel The Keeper of the Bees. There have been two previous film adaptations of the novel in 1925 and 1935. The novel was written by Gene Stratton Porter towards the end of her life, and the novel was published posthumously after a car accident. The film Keeper of the Bees was released in theaters on July 10, 1947, but the film seems to have been lost since then. The plot of the third film adaptation was changed greatly compared to the first two film adaptations. When the film was originally released by Columbia Pictures, audiences seemed to enjoy the film.

== Plot ==
An aging apiary owner (bee-keeper) Michael Worthington meets a young ex-painter, Jamie McFarlane, on the road one day and in the process of conversation, attempts to persuade him to end his nomadic lifestyle.

Jamie listens, but considers the "Bee Master's" advice useless. But shortly after, when Michael has a near fatal heart attack; Jamie promises to look after the bees until his return. Shortly after, Worthington is surprised by a twelve-year-old girl who goes by the nick-name - 'Little Scout' who would visit the apiary nearly every day. He discovers that she is an orphan and likewise takes her into his care. In her child like way, she develops a crush on Jamie while he cares for the bees that have been left in his charge.

When Jamie meets Alice, the daughter of the orphanage supervisor, Mrs Ferris, he falls in love. This unexpected encounter begins to loosen his hardened heart and he begins to paint again.

Jamie eventually confides in Alice that he was once married, but that he had been divorced some time ago. In reality the divorce hasn't gone through yet. He sends his paintings to a gallery in New York, where he used to be a reputed artist. His soon to be ex-wife, Marcia, finds out about his recovered ability to paint and the success his paintings make, and wants to reconcile.

Alice hears about Marcia contacting Jamie, calling herself Mrs. McFarlane and is very distressed. Jamie suspects Alice of having betrayed his confidence, and Little Scout has to prove her innocence. She forces Mrs. Ferris to admit that she has spread the rumors by letting a swarm of bees loose on her.

Soon the elder Michael has recovered from his heart condition and manages to reconcile all the involved persons. He blesses the union of Jamie and Alice and gives them a cottage to live in after their marriage. In turn they decide to adopt Little Scout as their daughter, thereby bringing all the bees back into the fold.

== Cast ==
- Michael Duane as Jamie McFarlaine
- Gloria Henry as Alice
- Harry Davenport as Michael Worthington
- Jane Darwell as Mrs. Ferris
- Jo Ann Marlowe as Little Scout - The Orphan
- J. Farrell MacDonald as Postmaster
- Will Wright as Dr. Grayson
- Frances Robinson as Mrs. Marcia MacFarlane
- George Meader as Barber
- Olin Howland as Customer (as Olin Howlin)
- Jessie Arnold as Mrs. Postmaster

== History and disappearance ==
Instead of being a war veteran, Jamie is portrayed as an ex-painter, and the Little Scout is also portrayed as openly identifying as female unlike the novel, where the Scout is only ten, has a deliberately androgynous presentation, and it is only under extreme duress that her sex is discovered. Unlike the first two film adaptations, the third one was changed quite drastically by the screenwriters.

Being released into theaters on July 10, 1947, Keeper of the Bees seems to have gone missing since then. Only a few photos of the original film have survived to this day. Information about the film is difficult to find despite the star-studded cast in it and reputable film production company backing it. The film was also released in theaters in England several months after it was released in the United States. The films was seemingly dubbed into Spanish, as a Spanish film poster was made. The title of the Spanish dubbed version of the film translates into "Your Little Big Secret."

In July 2024 a 16mm film print of this title was offered on eBay, so it seems that this movie is not "lost".
