= Six Gun Man =

1946 film

- Theatrical release poster
- Directed by: Harry L. Fraser
- Screenplay by: Harry L. Fraser
- Produced by: Arthur Alexander
- Starring: Bob Steele; Syd Saylor; Jimmy Martin; Jean Carlin; I. Stanford Jolley; Brooke Temple; Bud Osborne; Budd Buster
- Cinematography: Jack Greenhalgh
- Edited by: Roy Livingston
- Production company: Producers Releasing Corporation
- Distributed by: Producers Releasing Corporation
- Release date: February 1, 1946
- Running time: 59 minutes
- Country: United States
- Language: English

Six Gun Man is a 1946 American Western film written and directed by Harry L. Fraser. The film stars Bob Steele, Syd Saylor, Jimmy Martin, Jean Carlin, I. Stanford Jolley, Brooke Temple, Bud Osborne and Budd Buster. The film was released on February 1, 1946, by Producers Releasing Corporation.

== Cast ==
- Bob Steele as Bob 'Stormy' Storm
- Syd Saylor as Syd 'Rawhide' McTavish
- Jimmy Martin as Tim Hager
- Jean Carlin as Laura Barton
- I. Stanford Jolley as Matt Haley
- Brooke Temple as Ed Slater
- Bud Osborne as Sam Elkins
- Budd Buster as Joe Turner
- Stanley Blystone as Lon Kelly
- Roy Brent as Slim Peters
- Steve Clark as Sheriff Jennings
- Dorothy Whitmore as Mrs. Barton
