= Rolling Home (1946 film) =

1946 film by William A. Berke

- Directed by: William Berke
- Written by: Edwin V. Westrate
- Based on: story by William Berke
- Produced by: William Berke (producer); Samuel K. Decker (associate producer); Robert L. Lippert (executive producer)
- Starring: Jean Parker; Russell Hayden; Pamela Blake
- Cinematography: Benjamin H. Kline
- Edited by: Arthur A. Brooks
- Music by: Darrell Calker
- Production company: Affiliated Productions
- Distributed by: Screen Guild Productions
- Release date: November 1, 1946
- Running time: 71 minutes (U.S.)
- Country: United States
- Language: English

Rolling Home is a 1946 American drama film directed by William Berke and starring Jean Parker, Russell Hayden, and Pamela Blake.

== Cast ==
- Jean Parker as Frances Crawford
- Russell Hayden as Reverend David Owens
- Pamela Blake as Pamela Crawford
- Raymond Hatton as Pop Miller
- Jo Ann Marlowe as Sandy Crawford
- Jimmy Conlin as Grandpa Crawford
- Robert Henry as Gary Miller – Grandson
- Jonathan Hale as Henry Kane
- George Tyne as Joe
- Milton Parsons as Charlie Kane
- Harry Carey Jr. as Dobey
- William Farnum as Rodeo official
- Elmo Lincoln as Racing official
- André Charlot as Dr. Clark
- Jimmie Dodd as Cowboy guitarist
