= Danny Boy (1946 film) =

1946 film by Terry O. Morse

- Directed by: Terry O. Morse
- Written by: Taylor Caven (story); Raymond L. Schrock (screenplay)
- Produced by: Leon Fromkess (producer); Martin Mooney (associate producer)
- Starring: See below
- Cinematography: Jack Greenhalgh
- Edited by: George McGuire
- Music by: Walter Greene
- Distributed by: Producers Releasing Corporation
- Release date: 8 January 1946
- Running time: 64 minutes 26 minutes (American edited version) (TV)
- Country: United States
- Language: English

Danny Boy is a 1946 American film directed by Terry O. Morse. The film is also known as Adventures of Danny Boy (American TV title).

== Plot ==
Danny Boy is a well-trained German shepherd dog that has been in service with the U.S. Marines, but which is now returned to his previous owner, young Jimmy Bailey.

Jimmy discovers that his best friend has changed while away and doesn't recognize him anymore. Jimmy's ex-marine friend Joe Cameron tells him to be patient and spend a lot of time with the dog, take it to all the familiar places they used to go to, and play the same games as they used to.

Soon Danny Boy starts to become his old self, but the mean next-door neighbor, Frank "Grumpy" Andrews, claims that the dog is a danger to public safety, being a former war dog. When Jimmy breaks the neighbor's window by accident while playing baseball, the neighbor threatens to call the police.

Jimmy vows to pay for the repair, and he and the other boys start vending lemonade in the street to raise the money. Meanwhile, a nearby farmer sees the beautiful dog and tells Andrews that he wants it. Without scruples, Andrews helps the farmer to steal the dog in the night, and the new "owner" starts abusing Danny Boy to make him obedient. Danny Boy runs away from the farmer and returns to Jimmy, bruised and battered. The dog thief is disclosed when Danny Boy attacks the farmer upon his return to the street. Andrews tries to shoot the dog and gets bitten. The police are called to the scene, but Jimmy escapes with his dog before they arrive.

Joe persuades Jimmy to turn the dog in to the police, fully convinced that the police will understand the situation and let the dog go. But it turns out that Danny Boy is deemed unfit to remain in society and is to be put down by being executed in a gas chamber.

Joe tries to help by explaining that Danny Boy is a decorated military dog that has proved very useful. He begs that the dog at least get a worthy ending by firing squad, rather than die like a common criminal. Joe is given the assignment to shoot Danny Boy and takes him away in his truck. Jimmy gets to say goodbye to the dog in front of the others, and then Joe takes him into the forest to kill him.

As it turns out, Danny Boy rescues a small boy from being hit by a passing train, by pulling him off the tracks at the last second. Meanwhile, Jimmy has found the whip and Danny Boy's leash in the farmer's barn, proving that he had abused the dog extensively.

The decision to put down Danny Boy is revoked, and the farmer and Andrews are both arrested for torturing the animal. Jimmy is then reunited with his beloved dog.

== Cast ==
- Robert 'Buzz' Henry as Jimmy Bailey
- Ralph Lewis as Joe Cameron
- Sybil Merritt as Margie Bailey, Jimmy's Sister
- Helen Brown as Mrs. Bailey, Jimmy's Mom
- Walter Soderling as Frank 'Grumpy' Andrews
- Joseph Granby as Lafe Dunkell the Orange Man
- Mickey McGuire as Pudgie, Camper's Club
- Bobby Valentine as Rinky, Camper's Club
- Charles Bates as Louie, Camper's Club
- Larry Dixon as Tuffy, Camper's Club
- Eve March as Ruthie Johnson, Jackie's Mom
- Ace the Wonder Dog as Danny Boy
- Richard Kipling as Judge Carter
- James Metcalfe
- Tay Dunn as Ed Johnson
- Pat Gleason as Soldier
- Eric Younger as Jackie Johnson
- Myron Wilton as Hal
