= Wild West (1946 film) =

1946 film

- Directed by: Robert Emmett Tansey
- Written by: Frances Kavanaugh; Robert Emmett Tansey; Dorcas Cochran
- Produced by: Robert Emmett Tansey
- Starring: Eddie Dean; Roscoe Ates; Sarah Padden
- Cinematography: Fred Jackman Jr.
- Edited by: Hugh Winn
- Music by: Karl Hajos
- Production company: Producers Releasing Corporation
- Distributed by: Producers Releasing Corporation
- Release date: December 1, 1946
- Running time: 73 minutes
- Country: United States
- Language: English

Wild West is a 1946 American western film directed by Robert Emmett Tansey and starring Eddie Dean, Roscoe Ates and Sarah Padden. It was one of a series of westerns featuring Dean and Ates, made and distributed by Producers Releasing Corporation. It was shot in Cinecolor.

== Plot ==
Eddie leads a team laying out new telegraph wires, but faces efforts of a gang to sabotage their work. Ultimately it ends in a showdown between the two sides.

== Cast ==
- Eddie Dean as Eddie Dean
- Flash as Flash - Eddie's Horse
- Roscoe Ates as Soapy Jones
- Sarah Padden as Carrie Bannister
- Lash La Rue as Stormy Day
- Robert 'Buzz' Henry as Skinny Bannister
- Louise Currie as Florabelle Bannister
- Jean Carlin as Mollie Bannister
- Lee Bennett as Bill Butler - Engineer
- Terry Frost as Drake Dawson
- Warner Richmond as Judge Templeton
- Lee Roberts as Capt. Rogers
- Chief Yowlachie as Chief Black Fox
- Bob Duncan as Rockky - Henchman
- John Bridges as Constable
- Al Ferguson as Kansas - Henchman
- Bud Osborne as Cactus - Henchman

== Bibliography ==
- Drew, Bernard A. Motion Picture Series and Sequels: A Reference Guide. Routledge, 2013.
- Pitts, Michael R. Western Movies: A Guide to 5,105 Feature Films. McFarland, 2012.
