= Erna Lazarus =

Screenwriter

- Born: June 16, 1903; Boston, Massachusetts, U.S.
- Died: February 19, 2006 (aged 102); Woodland Hills, California, U.S.
- Occupations: Screen and television writer

Erna Lazarus (June 16, 1903 – February 19, 2006) was a screen and television writer from the 1930s through the 1960s.

Lazarus, born in Boston, Massachusetts, was one of the founding members of the Screen Writers Guild. On her death, Variety credited her as "one of the first female screenwriters working steadily in the studio system." She also had an influential role in the formation of the Interguild Federal Credit Union.

Lazarus died on February 19, 2006, in Woodland Hills, California, at the age of 102.

== Selected filmography ==
- Hollywood or Bust (the last film featuring Jerry Lewis and Dean Martin) – sole story and screen play
- Flareup (starring Raquel Welch) – associate producer
- Meet Me After the Show (starring Betty Grable) – original story
- Moonlight in Hawaii
- Double Date
- Atlantic Flight
- Let's Go Steady
- The Girl of the Limberlost (1945)
- Slightly Scandalous (1946)

== Selected radio writing ==
- Mayor of the Town

== Selected TV writing ==
- Racket Squad
- Mr. and Mrs. North
- Petticoat Junction
- Bewitched
- Hawaiian Eye
- Surfside Six
