= Jean Carlin =

American actress (1921–1998)

- Carlin in The Caravan Trail (1946)
- Born: September 2, 1921; Long Beach, California, U.S.
- Died: October 23, 1998 (aged 77); Los Angeles, California, U.S.
- Occupation: Actress

Jean Carlin (September 2, 1921 – October 23, 1998) was an American film actress.

== Early years ==
Carlin was the daughter of Mr. and Mrs. Roy Carlin. Her father was a steamship company executive.

== Career ==
As a child she grew up devoting her time to the arts. She loved performing arts, including dancing, theater, and acting. After moving to Los Angeles, she quickly signed with a Hollywood agent. By the age of 23, and under the stage name "Carlin", she had appeared in her first major motion picture, Are These Our Parents?. For the next two years, she made over 11 major motion pictures, and was named "The Wild West Woman", often co starring with fellow castmate Eddie Dean in westerns such as Six Gun Man and Caravan Trail.

== Personal life ==
On August 30, 1947, Carlin married Captain James Wellington Pearson in Dallas. She moved from Hollywood, retired from acting, and settled down with Pearson. They went on to have three children. Eric, Nancy, and Ulrika.

== Death ==
Carlin died in October, 1998.

== Filmography ==
- Are These Our Parents? (1944)
- Ghost of Hidden Valley (1946)
- Six Gun Man (1946)
- Behind the Mask (1946)
- The Well-Groomed Bride (1946) (uncredited)
- The Caravan Trail (1946)
- Wild West (1946)
