= The Caravan Trail =

1946 film

- Theatrical release poster
- Directed by: Robert Emmett Tansey
- Screenplay by: Frances Kavanaugh
- Produced by: Robert Emmett Tansey
- Starring: Eddie Dean; Lash LaRue; Emmett Lynn; Jean Carlin; Robert Malcolm; Charles King
- Cinematography: Marcel Le Picard
- Edited by: Hugh Winn
- Production company: Producers Releasing Corporation
- Distributed by: Producers Releasing Corporation
- Release date: April 20, 1946
- Running time: 53 minutes
- Country: United States
- Language: English

The Caravan Trail is a 1946 American Western film directed by Robert Emmett Tansey and written by Frances Kavanaugh. The film stars Eddie Dean, Lash LaRue, Emmett Lynn, Jean Carlin, Robert Malcolm and Charles King. The film was released on April 20, 1946, by Producers Releasing Corporation.

== Cast ==
- Eddie Dean as Eddie Dean
- Lash LaRue as Cherokee
- Emmett Lynn as Ezra
- Jean Carlin as Paula Bristol
- Robert Malcolm as Jim Bristol
- Charles King as Reno
- Robert Barron as Joe King
- Forrest Taylor as Judge Silas Black
- Bob Duncan as Poker Face
- Jack O'Shea as Killer
- Terry Frost as Bart Barton
