= Slightly Scandalous =

1946 film

- Theatrical release poster
- Directed by: Will Jason
- Screenplay by: Erna Lazarus; David Mathews; Joel Malone; Jerry Warner
- Produced by: Stanley Rubin
- Starring: Frederick Brady; Sheila Ryan; Paula Drew; Walter Catlett; Lita Baron; Louis DaPron; Jack Marshall
- Cinematography: George Robinson
- Edited by: Fred R. Feitshans Jr.
- Production company: Universal Pictures
- Distributed by: Universal Pictures
- Release date: August 2, 1946
- Running time: 66 minutes
- Country: United States
- Language: English

Slightly Scandalous is a 1946 American comedy film directed by Will Jason and written by Erna Lazarus, David Mathews, Joel Malone and Jerry Warner. The film stars Frederick Brady, Sheila Ryan, Paula Drew, Walter Catlett, Lita Baron, Louis DaPron and Jack Marshall. It was released on August 2, 1946, by Universal Pictures.

== Cast ==
- Frederick Brady as Jerry Roberts / John Roberts / James Roberts
- Sheila Ryan as Christine Wright
- Paula Drew as Trudy Price
- Walter Catlett as Mr. Wright
- Lita Baron as Lola
- Louis DaPron as Rocky
- Jack Marshall as Erwin
- Nick Moro as Mexican Singer
- Frank Yaconelli as Mexican Singer
- Anne O'Neal as Minerva Wright
- Dorese Midgley as Specialty Dancer
- Georgann Smith as Specialty Dancer
