= Charles Bates (actor) =

American actor (1934–2023)

- Born: October 22, 1934; Los Angeles, California, U.S.
- Died: May 2023 (aged 88); Spokane, Washington, U.S.
- Years active: 1935–1952

Charles Edward Perry Jr. (October 22, 1934 – May 2023), better known as Charles Bates was an American child actor.

Bates appeared in over 40 films between 1935 and 1952, mostly in small roles. He is probably best known as young Roger Newton in Alfred Hitchcock's thriller Shadow of a Doubt (1943). Other notable roles include The North Star (1943), San Diego, I Love You (1944), Pursued (1947) and Shockproof (1949). His last film was The Snows of Kilimanjaro, where he played Gregory Peck's character as a 17-year-old.

Bates went on to study electrical engineering, and retired from the State of California in 1996 as a senior electrical engineer. After retirement, he lived in the Pacific Northwest. Bates died in Spokane, Washington in May 2023, at the age of 88.

== Filmography ==
- Tall, Dark and Handsome (1941) – Boy (uncredited)
- Blossoms in the Dust (1941) – (uncredited)
- The Mexican Spitfire's Baby (1941) – Little Boy (uncredited)
- The Vanishing Virginian (1942) – Yancey's Grandson (uncredited)
- I Married a Witch (1942) – Wooley's Son (uncredited)
- Shadow of a Doubt (1943) – Roger Newton
- The Man from Down Under (1943) – French Boy (uncredited)
- Hostages (1943) – Peter (uncredited)
- The Strange Death of Adolf Hitler (1943) – Viki Huber
- Son of Dracula (1943) – Tommy Land (uncredited)
- The North Star (1943) – Patya
- In Old Oklahoma (1943) – Little Sun (uncredited)
- The Song of Bernadette (1943) – Adolard Bouhouhorts - Age 7 (uncredited)
- The Fighting Sullivans (1944) – Rival Boy (uncredited)
- Lady in the Dark (1944) – David (uncredited)
- The Curse of the Cat People (1944) – Jack (uncredited)
- Once Upon a Time (1944) – Boy (uncredited)
- In the Meantime, Darling (1944) – Boy (uncredited)
- San Diego, I Love You (1944) – Larry McCooley
- An American Romance (1944) – Teddy Roosevelt Dangos - Age 8 (uncredited)
- And Now Tomorrow (1944) – Frightened Boy (uncredited)
- Destiny (1944) – Boy (uncredited)
- The Clock (1945) – Child (uncredited)
- Mama Loves Papa (1945) – Boy (uncredited)
- Danny Boy (1945) – Louie
- The Hoodlum Saint (1946) – Johnny Ryan's Brother (uncredited)
- The Green Years (1946) – Angelo Friscalli (uncredited)
- The Virginian (1946) – Boy Prisoner (uncredited)
- Night in Paradise (1946) – Boy (uncredited)
- Three Wise Fools (1946) – Eddie Oakleaf (uncredited)
- My Brother Talks to Horses (1947) – Boy at School (uncredited)
- Pursued (1947) – Adam, age 11
- Little Mister Jim (1947) – Neighbor Boy (uncredited)
- Golden Earrings (1947) – Minor Role (uncredited)
- Merton of the Movies (1947) – Boy in Theatre (uncredited)
- Her Husband's Affairs (1947) – Boy (uncredited)
- Summer Holiday (1948) – Boy (uncredited)
- The Three Musketeers (1948) – D'Artagnan's Brother (uncredited)
- Shockproof (1949) – Tommy Marat
- The Sun Comes Up (1949) – Orphan (uncredited)
- The Snows of Kilimanjaro (1952) – Harry at Seventeen (uncredited) (final film role)
