= Ghost of Hidden Valley =

1946 film directed by Sam Newfield

- Theatrical release poster
- Directed by: Sam Newfield
- Screenplay by: Ellen Coyle
- Story by: Ellen Coyle
- Produced by: Sigmund Neufeld
- Starring: Buster Crabbe; Al St. John; Jean Carlin; John Meredith; Charles King; Jimmy Aubrey
- Cinematography: Arthur Reed
- Edited by: Holbrook N. Todd
- Production company: Producers Releasing Corporation
- Distributed by: Producers Releasing Corporation
- Release date: June 5, 1946
- Running time: 56 minutes
- Country: United States
- Language: English

Ghost of Hidden Valley is a 1946 American Western film directed by Sam Newfield and written by Ellen Coyle. The film stars Buster Crabbe, Al St. John, Jean Carlin, John Meredith, Charles King and Jimmy Aubrey. The film was released on June 5, 1946, by Producers Releasing Corporation.

== Plot ==
Ed Blackie Dawson (Charles King) and his gang of ne'er-do-well cattle rustlers are driving their heist across the abandoned Trenton ranch. When a stranger shows up at the ranch, Dawson kills him and blames the deed on the "ghost of Hidden Valley." Henry Trenton (John Meredith) then appears on the scene from England with the intent of inheriting the ranch, but Dawson is again determined to get rid of the gadfly and keep the "ghost ranch" legend alive. Good guys Billy Carson (Buster Crabbe) and his sidekick Fuzzy Q. Jones (Al St. John), who were friends with Trenton's father, Dudley, save him from the initial attack. Although "Fuzzy" is superstitious and leery of a haunted ranch, the trio of Trenton, Carson, and Jones head to the Trenton ranch to spend the night. Dawson begins to have second thoughts about all the killings, but his boss, Arnold, has other ideas.

Arnold, aka Jim Slade, orders Dawson to kill Trenton. Carson and Fuzzy deduce that the abandoned ranch has been used to hide stolen cattle, and then recognize Arnold as a gang member that's been run out of Cheyenne when town members stood up to the gang. Arnold and Dawson kidnap Trenton, hoping to force him to sign over the ranch. Dawson pleads with Arnold to spare Trenton's life, but Arnold eventually just kills his former partner, Dawson. In the middle of the fray, Fuzzy distracts Arnold, and Carson rescues Trenton. Arnold then tries to blame Carson for Dawson's death, but the truth survives, the outlaws are captured, and the ranch is saved. All that's left is the romantic adventures of Trenton and Dawson's niece Kaye.

== Cast ==
- Buster Crabbe as Billy Carson
- Al St. John as Fuzzy Q. Jones
- Jean Carlin as Kaye Dawson
- John Meredith as Henry Trenton
- Charles King as Ed Dawson
- Jimmy Aubrey as Tweedle
- Karl Hackett as Jed
- John Cason as Sweeney
- Silver Harr as Stage Guard
- Zon Murray as Arnold aka Jim Slade

== See also ==
The "Billy the Kid" films starring Buster Crabbe:

- Billy the Kid Wanted (1941)
- Billy the Kid's Round-Up (1941)
- Billy the Kid Trapped (1942)
- Billy the Kid's Smoking Guns (1942)
- Law and Order (1942)
- Sheriff of Sage Valley (1942)
- The Mysterious Rider (1942)
- The Kid Rides Again (1943)
- Fugitive of the Plains (1943)
- Western Cyclone (1943)
- Cattle Stampede (1943)
- The Renegade (1943)
- Blazing Frontier (1943)
- Devil Riders (1943)
- Frontier Outlaws (1944)
- Valley of Vengeance (1944)
- The Drifter (1944)
- Fuzzy Settles Down (1944)
- Rustlers' Hideout (1944)
- Wild Horse Phantom (1944)
- Oath of Vengeance (1944)
- His Brother's Ghost (1945)
- Thundering Gunslingers (1945)
- Shadows of Death (1945)
- Gangster's Den (1945)
- Stagecoach Outlaws (1945)
- Border Badmen (1945)
- Fighting Bill Carson (1945)
- Prairie Rustlers (1945)
- Lightning Raiders (1945)
- Terrors on Horseback (1946)
- Gentlemen with Guns (1946)
- Ghost of Hidden Valley (1946)
- Prairie Badmen (1946)
- Overland Riders (1946)
- Outlaws of the Plains (1946)
