= Little Iodine (film) =

1946 film by Reginald LeBorg

- Theatrical release poster
- Directed by: Reginald LeBorg
- Screenplay by: Richard H. Landau
- Based on: Little Iodine by Jimmy Hatlo
- Produced by: Ralph Cohn; Charles Rogers
- Starring: Jo Ann Marlowe; Marc Cramer; Eve Whitney; Irene Ryan; Hobart Cavanaugh
- Cinematography: Robert Pittack
- Edited by: Lynn Harrison
- Music by: Alexander Steinert
- Production company: Comet Productions
- Distributed by: United Artists
- Release date: October 20, 1946
- Running time: 57 minutes
- Country: United States
- Language: English

Little Iodine is a 1946 American comedy film directed by Reginald LeBorg and written by Richard H. Landau. The film is based on the comic strip Little Iodine by Jimmy Hatlo. The film stars Jo Ann Marlowe, Marc Cramer, Eve Whitney, Irene Ryan, and Hobart Cavanaugh. Little Iodine was produced by Comet Productions and released on October 20, 1946, by United Artists. All prints of the film were believed to be destroyed after 10 years, effectively making it a lost film. In December 2024, Missing Episodes hunter Ray Langstone spotted a 35mm film reel in the UCLA Film and Television Archive.

== Plot ==
Little Iodine stays true to her comic strip nature in this film, where she does her best to break up the marriage of her parents "the Tremblechins", ruin a romance between Janis and Marc, and cost her father his job. Unlike her comic-based character, however, Iodine has a change of heart and sets out to right the wrongs.

== Cast ==
- Jo Ann Marlowe as Little Iodine
- Marc Cramer as Marc Andrews
- Eve Whitney as Janis Payne
- Irene Ryan as Mrs. Tremble
- Hobart Cavanaugh as Mr. Tremble
- Lanny Rees as Horace
- Leon Belasco as Simkins
- Emory Parnell as Mr. Bigdome
- Sarah Selby as Mrs. Bigdome
- Jean Tartriquin as Grandma Jones

== Production ==
Termed a "comic strip" picture, Little Iodine is adapted from the characters in Little Iodine created by Jimmy Hatlo. Hatlo also originated the popular panel feature They'll Do It Every Time. Film historian Wheeler W. Dixon reports that director Reginald LeBorg "thought little of the project." In an interview with Dixon in 1988, LeBorg remarked:

It was a cartoon. It was for teenagers. They wanted to get a new audience in at United Artists, so [producer] "Buddy" Rogers came up with the idea.
