= Lita Baron =

Spanish-American actress and singer (1923–2015)

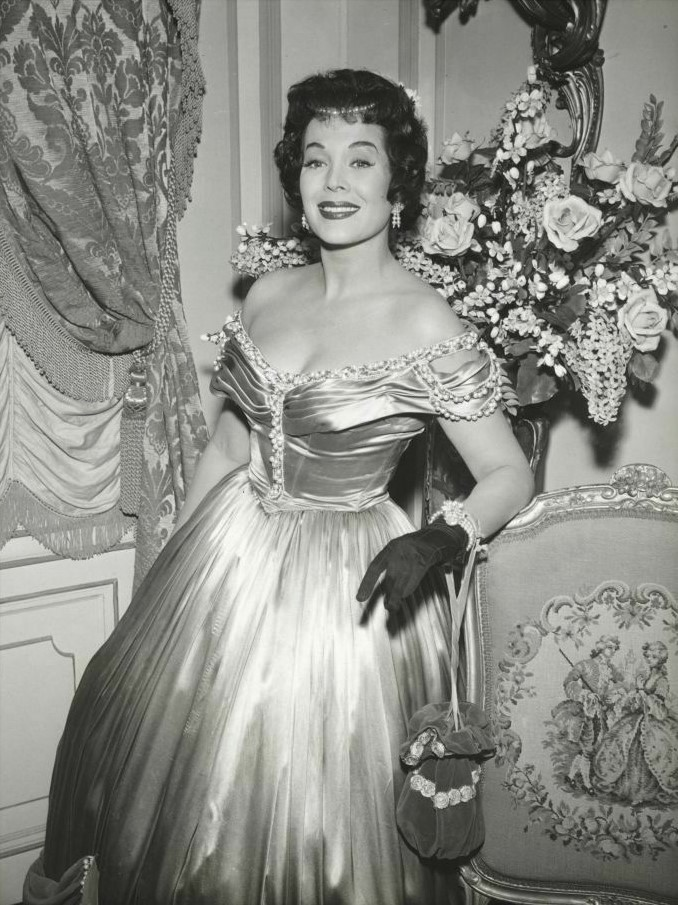
- Baron in 1960
- Born: Isabel Castro; August 11, 1923; Almería, Spain
- Died: December 16, 2015 (aged 92); Palm Springs, California, U.S.
- Other names: Isabelita
- Occupations: Actress; singer
- Years active: 1944–1979
- Spouse: Rory Calhoun (m. 1948; div. 1970)
- Children: 3

Lita Baron (born Isabel Castro; August 11, 1923 – December 16, 2015) was a Spanish-born American actress and singer who appeared in movies and television shows for over 30 years.

== Early life ==
Baron was born Isabel Castro in Almería, Spain, on August 11, 1923, and emigrated to the United States with her family in 1928. Her parents were Pedro and Francesca Castro.

After moving, the family lived in River Rouge, Michigan, where she attended River Rouge High School.

== Career ==
Baron started her career in show business as a singer and dancer with Xavier Cugat's orchestra. Billed as Isabelita, she also had her own act in nightclubs in Hollywood.

Starting in 1944, she appeared in several Hollywood films and television series. Her last screen role came in the 1979 film Bitter Heritage, in which her then ex-husband Rory Calhoun starred. She later worked in radio and real estate.

== Personal life ==
In 1948, Baron married Hollywood actor Rory Calhoun. The couple had three daughters. Baron and Calhoun divorced in 1970, and she cited his multiple extramarital affairs as one of the reasons for the separation.

Baron supported Barry Goldwater in the 1964 United States presidential election.

== Death ==
Baron died in Palm Springs, California, on December 16, 2015, at age 92. The cause of death was complications from a fall, which had resulted in a broken hip.

== Filmography ==
Year	Title	Role	Notes
1944	That's My Baby!	Isabelita	
1945	Pan-Americana	Lupita	
1945	The Gay Senorita	Chiquita	
1945	Club Havana	Isabelita	
1946	Slightly Scandalous	Lola	
1946	High School Hero	Chi-Chi	
1946	Don Ricardo Returns	Dorothea	
1947	That's My Gal	Isabelita	
1948	Jungle Jim	Zia	
1949	Border Incident	Rosita	Uncredited
1949	Bomba on Panther Island	Losana	
1951	Savage Drums	Sari	
1954	Jesse James' Women	Delta	
1955	The Treasure of Pancho Villa	Birdcage Flirt in Plaza	Uncredited
1956	Red Sundown	Maria	
1956	The Broken Star	Conchita Alvarado	
1960	Compadece al delincuente	flamenco dance couple	
1979	Bitter Heritage	La Madre	(final film role)
