= Carol Thurston =

American actress (1920–1969)

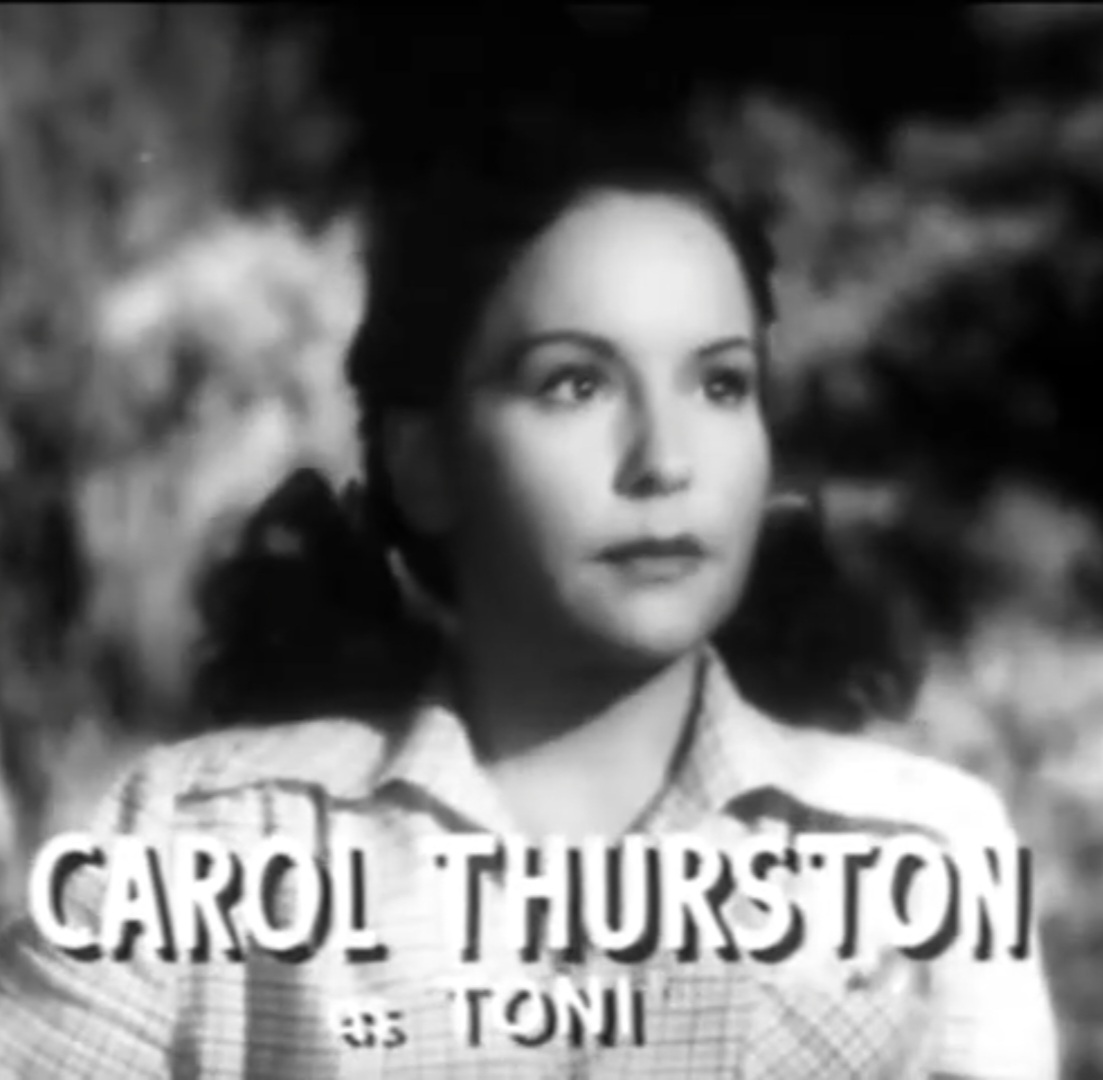
- Thurston in Swamp Fire (1946)
- Born: Betty Lou Thurston; September 27, 1920; Valley City, North Dakota, U.S.
- Died: December 31, 1969 (aged 49); Hollywood, California, U.S.
- Occupation: Actress
- Years active: 1944–1963
- Spouses: David S. Thayer (m. 1947; div. 1949) John Russo (m. 1956; div. 1960) Robert Creighton Williams (m. 1962)
- Children: 1

Carol Thurston (born Betty Lou Thurston; September 27, 1920 – December 31, 1969) was an American film and television actress who played the fictitious Emma Clanton in eight episodes (1959–1961) of the ABC/Desilu Western television series The Life and Legend of Wyatt Earp.

== Background ==
Thurston was born Betty Lou Thurston in North Dakota of Irish descent to Harvey E. Thurston and the former Marie O'Loughlin. By 1930, she was residing with her family in Forsyth in Rosebud County in southeastern Montana. By the time she was 12, she began to work in her father's country repertory company. The Thurstons moved to Billings, Montana, where she was active in the Billings Civic Theater and graduated from Billings High School. In 1942, she moved with her family to Hollywood, where her father began employment with Lockheed Aircraft.

== Film ==
Thurston was typecast in the role of exotic native girls. She made her motion-picture debut in 1944, when Louella Parsons reported that Thurston had been selected over several other actresses by director Cecil B. De Mille to play the role of the Indonesian girl "Three Martini" in The Story of Dr. Wassell.

She appeared in eight other films in the 1940s, including the roles of Rosa in the spy thriller, The Conspirators, Siu-Mei in Pearl S. Buck's China Sky, Toni Rosseau in Swamp Fire, Carmelita Mendoza in Jewels of Brandenburg, Narana in Arctic Manhunt, and Watona in Apache Chief.

Thurston had parts in several other films of the 1950s, such as Saranna Koonuk in Arctic Flight and Turquoise in Flaming Feather (both 1952), and as Shari in Killer Ape and Terua, the wife of the Apache Chief Cochise, in Conquest of Cochise (both 1953). In 1954, she was cast as Yellow Flower in Yukon Vengeance; in 1955, as Mother in Pearl of the South Pacific (1955), and as Balhadi in The Women of Pitcairn Island (1956). By the middle 1950s, however, she had turned primarily to the new medium of television.

== Television ==
In 1949–1950, she was cast in two episodes, "Finders Keepers" and "Masked Deputy", of the Western series, The Lone Ranger. In 1952–1953, she performed in six episodes in different roles of The Adventures of Kit Carson. In 1954, she appeared in the episode "Sequoia" on the syndicated Death Valley Days, a Western anthology series. In 1955–1956, she was cast as Mrs. Cora McGill in "Paper Gunman" and as Annie Brayer in "The Salt War" of another Western anthology series, Frontier, on NBC.

Thurston had other guest roles in the 1950s on such series as Sky King, Soldiers of Fortune, The Rough Riders, 26 Men, Behind Closed Doors, Highway Patrol, Westinghouse Desilu Playhouse, and The Man and the Challenge. She was cast twice on the Richard Boone series, Have Gun - Will Travel, and once on CBS's Rawhide as Waneea in the 1959 episode, "Incident of the Power and the Plow".

=== As Emma Clanton ===
Thurston played the daughter of Newman Haynes Clanton, or Old Man Clanton, and while the real Clanton, an outlaw rancher near Tombstone in the Arizona Territory, had two daughters, neither was named "Emma", but instead Mary Elise and Ester Ann. Lyn Guild had played the role of Emma in two earlier 1959 episodes of The Life and Legend of Wyatt Earp.

Emma Clanton in the series had a romantic interest in Marshal Earp, and in the season in which she appeared, so did hotel owner Nellie Cashman, played by Randy Stuart. In most of the storylines, Earp seemed oblivious to both young women, but kind and respectful toward each.

Her appearances as Emma Clanton include:

- "Lineup for Battle" (September 29, 1959)
- "The Nugget and the Epitaph" (October 6, 1959)
- "You Can't Fight City Hall" (October 20, 1959)
- "Wyatt Wins One" (November 10, 1959)
- "The Noble Outlaws" (November 24, 1959)
- "The Clantons' Family Row" (December 8, 1959)
- "The Salvation of Emma Clanton", Emma appeals to Nellie Cashman and Marshal Earp to stop her father from making her marry Gringo Hawkby (Sam Gilman), a Clanton business partner and notorious outlaw. (April 5, 1960)
- "Clanton and Cupid" (March 21, 1961).

Thurston also was cast in different roles in four earlier episodes of The Life and Legend of Wyatt Earp before she landed the continuing role as Emma Clanton. In one of those episodes, "Old Jake" (April 9, 1957), Thurston played Mrs. Cafferty, the distraught wife of a soldier who in the episode is killed by a buffalo hunter.

Other than The Life and Legend of Wyatt Earp, her last television role was as Jenny Larson in the episode "Murder Plays it Cool" in the syndicated legal drama series, Lock-Up, starring Macdonald Carey. Thurston never acted again after the role of Smithy's wife in the 1963 Audie Murphy Western film, Showdown.

== Personal life ==
Thurston was married three times. She had a daughter, Amanda Lycklyn, with her first husband, David S. Thayer. Five years her senior, Thayer was a commercial pilot and a former lieutenant colonel in the United States Air Force. He played football at the University of Texas at Austin, Texas. The couple married in 1947 in Yuma, Arizona, and divorced two years later. Early in 1954, Thayer crashed a converted bomber owned by the Fullerton Oil Company into a residential district in Burbank, California. Though Thayer escaped with bruises, cuts, and shock, a man asleep in an apartment largely destroyed by flames suffered critical burns. Thayer thereafter became an oil operator and died in his native Houston in 1965 at the age of 47.

In 1950, Thurston and actor Ross Elliott became engaged to marry on November 23. That date came and went, however, without incident; less than three weeks later, the wedding was called off. In July 1956, Thurston embarked on her second marriage; this time to television actor John Russo (known variously as John Duke, Barry Russo, J.D. Russo, and John Duke Russo). By 1959, the two had become estranged, and by February of that year, Thurston was dating actor Jay Douglas. By January 1960, although neither of them had initiated divorce proceedings, each spouse was otherwise engaged – Russo with actress Dolores Michaels and Thurston with screenwriter Robert Creighton Williams. Eventually, the divorce was finalized, and on February 7, 1962, Thurston and Williams were wed. They remained so until Thurston's death at the age of 49, on New Year's Eve 1969. In the years since her death, the prevailing rumor was that Thurston committed suicide. However, her daughter, Amanda Thayer, has disputed this, insisting that she witnessed her mother in a Los Angeles hospital after she succumbed to heart failure and spent her last hours in a coma.

== Filmography ==
Year	Title	Role	Notes
1944	The Story of Dr. Wassell	Tremartini	
1944	The Conspirators	Rosa	
1945	China Sky	Siu-Mei	
1946	Swamp Fire	Toni Rousseau	
1947	Jewels of Brandenburg	Carmelita Mendoza	
1947	The Last Round-up	Lydia Henry	
1948	Rogues' Regiment	Li-Ho-Kay	
1949	Arctic Manhunt	Narana	
1949	Apache Chief	Watona	
1952	Flaming Feather	Turquoise	
1952	Arctic Flight	Saranna Koonuk	
1953	I, the Jury	Bonita	Uncredited
1953	Conquest of Cochise	Terua	
1953	Killer Ape	Shari	
1954	Yukon Vengeance	Yellow Flower	
1955	Pearl of the South Pacific	Mother	Uncredited
1956	The Women of Pitcairn Island	Balhadi	
1957	Hot Summer Night	Dodie James	Uncredited
1960	The Hypnotic Eye	Doris Scott	
1961	Posse from Hell	Mrs. Hutchins	Uncredited
1963	Showdown	Smithy's Wife	(final film role)
