= A Scandal in Paris =

1946 film by Douglas Sirk

- Vidocq admires Therese while sneaking back into the chateau after the jewel robbery.
- Directed by: Douglas Sirk
- Screenplay by: Ellis St. Joseph
- Story by: the memoirs of Eugène François Vidocq
- Produced by: Arnold Pressburger
- Starring: George Sanders; Signe Hasso; Carole Landis; Akim Tamiroff
- Narrated by: George Sanders
- Cinematography: Guy Roe; Eugen Schüfftan
- Edited by: Albrecht Joseph
- Music by: Hanns Eisler
- Production company: Arnold Pressburger Films
- Distributed by: United Artists
- Release date: July 19, 1946 (United States)
- Running time: 100 minutes
- Country: United States
- Language: English

A Scandal in Paris is a 1946 American biographical film directed by Douglas Sirk and starring George Sanders, Signe Hasso and Carole Landis. It loosely depicts the life of Eugène François Vidocq, a French criminal who reformed and became a famous French Prefect of Police during the Napoleonic era.

== Plot ==
The rogue who would later call himself Eugène François Vidocq is born in a prison cell, the twelfth child of a woman who steals a loaf of bread each time she needs shelter to give birth. As the boy grows into a man, he is constantly in and out of jail. As the story begins, he and his cutpurse cellmate and associate, Emile Vernet, escape using a file hidden in a birthday cake provided by Vernet's aunt Ernestine.

While making their way to Paris, they are hired to pose for a painter, Vidocq as Saint George and Vernet as the dragon. As the church painting nears completion, the pair steal the horse on which Vidocq is posing. In Paris, Uncle Hugo, the head of Vernet's criminal family, decides the safest place for the fugitives is in the army. He has a forger relative provide Vidocq with a fake commission as Lieutenant "Rousseau." While in Marseille, waiting to ship out to serve in Napoleon's campaign in Egypt, Vidocq encounters a singer named Loretta. She is intrigued with him, while he is more attracted to her ruby garter. Accompanying her when she goes to meet her boring admirer Richet, Vidocq manages to steal the garter.

After two years, Vidocq and Vernet leave the army. Returning to Paris, they make a detour around the church adorned by their likenesses. They come across the jewel-laden Marquise De Pierremont. Vidocq wrangles an invitation to her chateau after retrieving her pet monkey from a cemetery (where he also claims to be a relation of a Vidocq buried there). He is a bit alarmed when he discovers that his intended victim's son-in-law is the Minister of Police, but also enchanted by the official's daughter Therese. Unbeknownst to him, she has fallen in love with the image of Saint George, and is greatly disturbed by the painting's uncanny resemblance to their guest. Vidocq and Vernet steal and hide the Marquise's jewels, intending to return for them later.

However, when the minister fires Richet, who is now his chief of police, for not recovering the jewels, Vidocq devises a much grander scheme. Through "deduction", he leads the minister to the hiding place of the jewels, and wins for himself Richet's old job. In that capacity, he gets Vernet's entire band of criminal relatives hired at the Bank of Paris, which he intends to rob.

A complication arises when he bumps into Loretta, who turns out to have married Richet. After learning his new identity, Loretta blackmails Vidocq into resuming their relationship. Vidocq tells Vernet to go ahead with the robbery that night. That day, he goes out walking with Therese and her younger sister Mimi. When they are alone, Therese informs him that she has figured out that he stole the jewels. However, she does not care. She is quite willing to follow him, even if it means embarking on a life of crime. Meanwhile, a jealous Richet bursts in on Loretta as his wife waits for Vidocq at a hat store. Richet threatens to kill himself. Instead, in a fit of anger brought on by Loretta's cold response, he shoots and kills her.

With that impediment out of the way, Vidocq informs Vernet's family that he has changed his mind; he will hunt them down if they go through with the robbery. Nearly everyone is content with their new jobs at the bank – except Vernet, who ambushes his former friend, forcing Vidocq to kill him. Vidocq confesses his past crimes to the minister and the Marquise. Because he has truly repented and changed, he is forgiven by all of the De Pierremonts and welcomed into the family as he marries Therese.

== Cast ==
- George Sanders as Eugène François Vidocq
- Signe Hasso as Therese De Pierremont
- Carole Landis as Loretta
- Akim Tamiroff as Emile Vernet
- Gene Lockhart as Chief of Police Richet
- Alma Kruger as Marquise De Pierremont
- Alan Napier as Houdon De Pierremont
- Jo Ann Marlowe as Mimi De Pierremont
- Vladimir Sokoloff as Uncle Hugo
- Pedro de Cordoba as Priest
- Leona Maricle as Owner of Dress Shop
- Fritz Leiber as Painter
- Skelton Knaggs as Cousin Pierre
- Fred Nurney as Cousin Gabriel
- Gisela Werbisek as Aunt Ernestine (as Gisella Werbiseck)
- Marvin Davis as Little Louis
- Sam Harris as Stage Show Spectator (uncredited)
- Julius Tannen as Bank of Paris Manager (uncredited)

== Production ==
On November 14, 1945, Charles L. Gramlich of Ohio snuck into the studio dressing room of Carole Landis while she occupied it, and then attempted to unzip her costume. Gramlich was apprehended by the police on the scene and he was later identified by Landis at the Hollywood police station on November 17. Gramlich would later be institutionalized.

== Reception and legacy ==
Sirk placed the film among his favorite among his own works. J. Hoberman found that it ”belongs to a small cycle of 1940s costume dramas (Max Ophüls and Albert Lewin directed kindred movies) that sought, with varied success, to import European sophistication”.

The film was screened at the French Cinémathèque in 2005 and 2022 in as part of Sirk retrospectives.

== See also ==
Other films portraying Vidocq:

- Vidocq (1939)
- Vidocq (2001)
- The Emperor of Paris (2018)
