= List of Jean Parker performances =

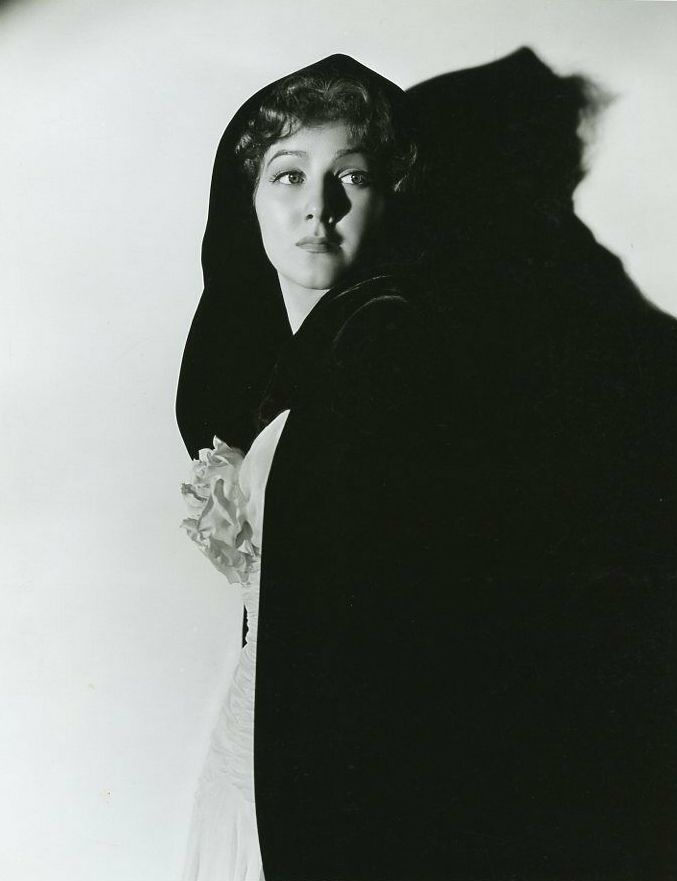
Parker in 1935

Jean Parker was an American film, stage, and television actress whose career spanned over three decades, beginning in the pre-code era. She made her feature debut in 1932's Divorce in the Family, followed by an uncredited bit part in Rasputin and the Empress (1932). Parker had her breakthrough role opposite Katharine Hepburn and Joan Bennett in George Cukor's Little Women (1933), portraying Elizabeth March. She subsequently starred in Frank Capra's comedy-mystery Lady for a Day (also 1933), followed by the romantic comedy The Ghost Goes West (1935).

Parker continued to star in films through the 1940s, notably opposite Lon Chaney in Dead Man's Eyes (1944), and in the film noir Bluebeard (1944). Beginning in 1946, Parker appeared on Broadway in the original production of Born Yesterday. She appeared in two additional Broadway productions after: Loco (1946), in the title role, and Burlesque (1946–1947).

By the 1950s, Parker's career had slowed, though she appeared in a small number of films, such as The Gunfighter (1950) and Those Redheads from Seattle (1953). She made her final film appearance in 1965's Apache Uprising before retiring from acting.

== Film ==
Year	Title	Role	Director(s)	Notes	Ref.
1932	Divorce in the Family	Lucile	Charles Reisner		
1932	Rasputin and the Empress	Princess Maria	Richard Boleslawski	Uncredited	
1933	The Secret of Madame Blanche	Eloise Duval	Charles Brabin		
1933	Gabriel Over the White House	Alice Bronson	Gregory La Cava		
1933	Made on Broadway	Adele Manners	Harry Beaumont		
1933	What Price Innocence?	Ruth Harper	Willard Mack		
1933	Storm at Daybreak	Danitza	Richard Boleslawski		
1933	Lady for a Day	Louise	Frank Capra		
1933	Little Women	Elizabeth "Beth" March	George Cukor		
1934	Two Alone	Mazy	Elliot Nugent		
1934	You Can't Buy Everything	Elizabeth "Beth" Burton Bell	Charles Reisner; Sandy Roth		
1934	Caravan	Timka	Erik Charell		
1934	Lazy River	Sarah Lescalle	George B. Seitz		
1934	Operator 13	Eleanor Shackleford	Richard Boleslawski		
1934	Have a Heart	Sally Moore	David Butler		
1934	A Wicked Woman	Rosanne	Charles Brabin		
1934	Limehouse Blues	Toni	Alexander Hall		
1934	Sequoia	Toni Martin	Chester M. Franklin		
1935	Princess O'Hara	Princess O'Hara	David Burton		
1935	Murder in the Fleet	Betty Lansing	Edward Sedgwick		
1935	The Ghost Goes West	Peggy Martin	René Clair		
1936	The Farmer in the Dell	Adie Boye	Ben Holmes		
1936	The Texas Rangers	Amanda Bailey	King Vidor		
1937	The Barrier	Necia Gale	Lesley Selander		
1937	Life Begins with Love	Carole Martin	Ray McCarey		
1938	Penitentiary	Elizabeth Mathews	John Brahm		
1938	Romance of the Limberlost	Laurie	William Nigh		
1938	The Arkansas Traveler	Judy Allen	Alfred Santell		
1939	Romance of the Redwoods	June Martin	Charles Vidor		
1939	Zenobia (UK: 'Elephants Never Forget')	Mary Tibbett	Gordon Douglas		
1939	She Married a Cop	Linda Fay	Sidney Salkow		
1939	Flight at Midnight	Maxine Scott	Sidney Salkow		
1939	Parents on Trial	Susan Wesley	Sam Nelson		
1939	The Flying Deuces	Georgette	A. Edward Sutherland		
1940	Knights of the Range	Holly Ripple	Lesley Selander		
1940	Son of the Navy	Stevie Moore	William Nigh		
1940	Beyond Tomorrow	Jean Lawrence	A. Edward Sutherland		
1940	Young America Flies	Jane	B. Reeves Eason	Short film	
1941	Roar of the Press	Alice Williams	Phil Rosen		
1941	Power Dive	Carol Blake	James P. Hogan		
1941	Flying Blind	Shirley Brooks	Frank McDonald		
1941	The Pittsburgh Kid	Patricia Mallory	Jack Townley		
1941	No Hands on the Clock	Louise Campbell	Frank McDonald		
1942	Torpedo Boat	Grace Holman	John Rawlins		
1942	The Girl from Alaska	Mary 'Pete' McCoy	Nick Grinde; William Witney		
1942	Hello, Annapolis	Doris Henley	Lew Landers		
1942	I Live on Danger	Susan Richards	Sam White		
1942	Hi, Neighbor	Dorothy Greenfield	Charles Lamont		
1942	Tomorrow We Live	Julie Bronson	Edgar G. Ulmer		
1942	Wrecking Crew	Peggy Starr	Frank McDonald		
1942	The Traitor Within	Molly Betts	Frank McDonald		
1943	High Explosive	Connie Baker	Frank McDonald		
1943	Alaska Highway	Ann Coswell	Frank McDonald		
1943	Minesweeper	Mary Smith	William Berke		
1943	Deerslayer	Judith Hutter	Lew Landers		
1944	The Navy Way	Ellen Sayre	William Berke		
1944	Lady in the Death House	Mary Kirk Logan	Steve Sekely		
1944	Detective Kitty O'Day	Kitty O'Day	William Beaudine		
1944	Oh, What a Night	Valerie	William Beaudine		
1944	One Body Too Many	Carol Dunlap	Frank McDonald		
1944	Dead Man's Eyes	Heather Hayden	Reginald LeBorg		
1944	Bluebeard	Lucille Lutien	Edgar G. Ulmer		
1945	Adventures of Kitty O'Day	Kitty O'Day	William Beaudine		
1946	Rolling Home	Frances Crawford	William Berke		
1950	The Gunfighter	Molly	Henry King		
1952	Toughest Man in Arizona	Della	R. G. Springsteen		
1953	Those Redheads From Seattle	Liz	Lewis R. Foster		
1954	Black Tuesday	Hattie Combest	Hugo Fregonese		
1955	A Lawless Street	Cora Dean	Joseph H. Lewis		
1957	The Parson and the Outlaw	Mrs. Sarah Jones	Oliver Drake		
1965	Apache Uprising	Mrs. Hawks	R. G. Springsteen		

== Television ==
Year	Title	Role	Notes	Ref.
1951	Pulitzer Prize Playhouse	Sally Field	Episode: "The Wisdom Tooth"	
1953	Cowboy G-Men	Dixie Shannon / Mayor Crystal Colby	2 episodes	
1954	Stories of the Century	Cattle Kate	Episode: "Cattle Kate"	
1954	The Lone Wolf	Agnes Henshaw	Episode: "The Department Store Story"	
1954	Adventures of the Falcon	Madge Reynolds	Episode: "The Big Heist"	
1955	The Eddie Cantor Comedy Theatre	Edith	Episode: "The Mink Coat"	
1955	Damon Runyon Theater	Dolly	Episode: "Barbeque"	
1956	Matinee Theater	Amelia	Episode: "Dinner at Antoine's"	
1956	Private Secretary	Edmee Esmond	Episode: "Cat in the Hot Tin File"	
1956	The Red Skelton Hour	Clara Appleby	Episode: "Appleby's Invention"	
1959	Frontier Doctor	Liz Lambert	Episode: "The Woman Who Dared"	

== Stage ==
Year	Title	Role	Venue	Ref.
1946	Loco	Loco Dempsey	Biltmore Theatre, New York City	
1946–1947	Burlesque	Bonny King	Belasco Theatre, New York City	
1948–1949	Born Yesterday	Billie Dawn	National Broadway tour	
1949	Light Up the Sky		Touring production; New York and Boston appearances	
1951	Detective Story	Mary McLeod	Gayety Theatre, Montreal	

== Sources ==
- Eames, John Douglas (1988). The MGM Story: The Complete History of Fifty Roaring Years. New York City, New York: Crown. ISBN 978-0-517-52613-2.
- Fishgall, Gary (2002). Gregory Peck: A Biography. New York City, New York: Simon and Schuster. ISBN 978-0-684-85290-4.
