= Peter Cookson =

American actor (1913–1990)

- Born: May 8, 1913; Milwaukie, Oregon, U.S.
- Died: January 6, 1990 (aged 76); Southfield, Massachusetts, U.S.
- Education: Pasadena Playhouse
- Occupations: Actor, director, writer
- Organization: Actors Studio
- Spouses: Maureen Gray (m. 1937; div. 1948) Beatrice Straight (m. 1949)
- Children: 4, including Peter W. Cookson Jr.

Peter Cookson (May 8, 1913 – January 6, 1990) was an American stage and film actor of the 1940s and 1950s. He was known for his collaborations with his wife, Beatrice Straight, an actress and member of the Whitney family.

== Early life ==
Cookson was born on May 8, 1913, on a houseboat on the Willamette River in Milwaukie, Oregon, to Gerald Cookson, a career British Army officer, and Helen Willis, a nurse. Cookson attended the Pasadena Playhouse on a scholarship.

== Career ==
Cookson appeared in the play The Heiress on Broadway in 1947, where he met his wife to-be, Beatrice Straight. He was also a producer and produced the play The Innocents on Broadway in 1950, starring his wife. Cookson's most famous stage role was of the love struck judge in Cole Porter's 1953 musical Can-Can in which he introduced the song "It's All Right With Me." His New York Times obituary noted that "[i]n interviews at the time, he said he was astonished at being given the part, as he had not sung for an audience since high school."

Cookson starred in several feature films during the 1940s, including G. I. Honeymoon (1945) and Fear (1946), before moving exclusively to television during the following decade.

He was a founding member of The Actors Studio, as was his second wife Beatrice Straight.

== Personal life ==
In 1937, Peter married Maureen Gray. Before their divorce in 1948, they had:

- Peter Cookson Jr.
- Jane Copland (née Cookson)

Peter and Maureen separated in Spring 1947. They attempted a reconciliation in the Summer of 1947, renting a house in Denver. At that time, Cookson had an affair with actress Patricia Neal. His wife found out and left him.

In 1948, while starring in the Broadway production of The Heiress, an adaptation of Henry James's Washington Square, Cookson met Beatrice Straight, who he was acting opposite. Straight was the daughter of Dorothy Payne Whitney, of the Whitney family, and Willard Dickerman Straight, an investment banker and diplomat. Straight's step-father was Leonard Knight Elmhirst. Cookson and Straight married in 1949, and had two children:

- Gary Cookson, an actor.
- Tony Cookson, writer and director of And You Thought Your Parents Were Weird (1991)

Cookson died in 1990 of bone cancer at his home in Southfield, Massachusetts. Beatrice died in 2001 from pneumonia in Northridge, Los Angeles at the age of eighty-six.

== Published works ==
- Henderson's Head (1973), a novel described as "sexually whiffy psychotic stuff" by Kirkus Reviews.
- Pigeons, a comedy play later turned into a script in 1986.
- Million Rosebuds (1978), a play written with the New Dramatists
- Unique Species (1984), a play.

== Filmography and credits ==
Title	Medium	Year	Role	Notes
Swingtime Johnny	Film	1943	Jonathan	
A Guy Named Joe	Film	1943	Sgt. Hanson (uncredited)	
Strange Confession	Film	1944	Soldier	
Detective Kitty O'Day	Film	1944	Johnny Jones	
The Girl Who Dared	Film	1944	Rufus Blair	
Shadow of Suspicion	Film	1944	Jimmy Dale	
Adventures of Kitty O'Day	Film	1945	Johnny Jones	
G.I. Honeymoon	Film	1945	Lt. Robert 'Bob" Gordon	
Behind City Lights	Film	1945	Lance Marlow	
The Scarlet Horseman	Film	1946	Kirk Norris	
Fear	Film	1946	Larry Crain	
Strange Conquest	Film	1946	William Sommers	
Don't Gamble with Strangers	Film	1946	Bob Randall	
Message for Margaret	Theatre	1947	Robert Chalcot	Theatre World Award (winner)
The Heiress	Theatre	1947–48	Morris Townsend	
The Philco-Goodyear Television Playhouse	Television	1949		
Robert Montgomery Presents	Television	1950	Maxim de Winter	
The Innocents	Theatre	1950		Producer (ft. Beatrice Straight)
The Billy Rose Show	Television	1951		
The Little Blue Light	Theatre	1950	Ellis	Producer
Lights Out	Television	1951		
The Web	Television	1951–52		
Broadway Television Theatre	Television	1952	Nathaniel Dunham	
Seagulls Over Sorrento	Theatre	1952		Producer
Justice	Television	1954		
Suspense	Television	1952–54	Maj. de Spain / Jack Trent	
Can-Can	Theatre	1953–5	Judge Aristide Forestier	
Studio One in Hollywood	Television	1954		
Appointment with Adventure	Television	1955	Jamison Wyatt	
Star Tonight	Television	1955		
The Millionaire	Television	1957	Alan Bruce	
Telephone Time	Television	1957	Paul Wallace	
Armstrong Circle Theatre	Television	1955–57		
The United States Steel Hour	Television	1957		
Four Winds	Theatre	1957	Garrett Scott	
Matinee Theatre	Television	1958	James	
The DuPont Show of the Month	Television	1958		
Kraft Theatre	Television	1952–58	Bruis / Mr. Knightley	
The Investigator	Television	1958	A Debonair Bachelor	
Rashomon	Theatre	1959		Producer
The Right Honourable Gentleman	Theatre	1965–66		Producer, Tony Award for Best Play (Nominee)
