= Shadow of Suspicion =

1944 film by William Beaudine

- Directed by: William Beaudine
- Written by: Albert DeMond; Earle Snell; Tim Ryan; Harold Goldman
- Produced by: A.W. Hackel
- Starring: Marjorie Weaver; Peter Cookson; Tim Ryan
- Cinematography: Marcel Le Picard
- Edited by: William Austin; Martin G. Cohn
- Music by: Lee Zahler
- Production company: Monogram Pictures
- Distributed by: Monogram Pictures
- Release date: September 23, 1944
- Running time: 68 minutes
- Country: United States
- Language: English

Shadow of Suspicion is a 1944 American comedy crime film directed by William Beaudine and starring Marjorie Weaver, Peter Cookson and Tim Ryan.

== Plot ==
The valuable Stonehaven necklace is set to be transferred to the Chicago branch of the Cartell & Co. jewelry store for purchase by Mr. and Mrs. Howard Vanderbrook of San Francisco. Jimmy Dale presents himself to the Chicago store as a Mr. Adams, attempting to purchase a ring on funds from a check that hasn't yet cleared his bank. When the store manager F.J. Randall refuses to approve the check, Dale tells him he's been sent by Cartell's president (Mr. Cartell) to make sure proper procedures are being followed, and that his real name is Everett G. Northrup, assistant to Mr. Cartell in the New York office. Suspicious, Randall calls the New York office and speaks to the real Northrup, who encourages Randall to string the man along to see what he's up to, and says he'll fly to Chicago the next day. Randall sets Dale up with an office and gives him the use of his secretary, Claire Winter, whom Dale has been flirting with.

When Northrup arrives in Chicago he tells Randall to call him Jimmy Dale. Dale and Northrup know each other and begin to surveil Randall from the adjoining office he's given to Dale. The necklace arrives, and Dale and Northrup pretend to document putting it in the safe with a movie camera, thereby getting the safe's combination. They then watch surreptitiously as he switches the necklace for an identical copy, putting the real one in a pair of baby shoes that he's had bronzed, and which he's asked Winter to deliver to his mother when she visits New York. When Randall leaves the office they remove the real necklace from the baby shoes.

The Vanderbrooks arrive and their expert tells them the necklace they're given is a fake, and Randall tells the police Dale (who he knows as Northrup) is responsible. Dale follows Winter on the train to New York, along with two of Randall's crooked associates. During the trip the newspapers print a story saying the necklace has been stolen by someone using the alias of Northrup, and Randall's men, pretending to be police officers, escort Dale off the train when they think he's being too friendly with Winter. Dale eventually escapes and follows Winter to New York.

Winter delivers the shoes to Randall's "mother," an older lady crook not actually related to him, but who is generally known as "Mother." She and two other crooks hold Winter when they don't find the necklace in the shoes, but Dale follows Winter's trail and arranges to have the police follow him into their house. When the police arrive they know Dale, let him and Winter go and arrest the crooks. In the final scene Northrup escorts Randall into Mr. Cartell's office, where he finds the police holding all the other crooks. Dale presents the real necklace to Cartell, then leaves with Winter.

== Cast ==
- Marjorie Weaver as Claire Winter
- Peter Cookson as Jimmy Dale
- Tim Ryan as Everett G. Northrup
- Pierre Watkin as Frank J. Randall
- Clara Blandick as Mother Randall
- J. Farrell MacDonald as Police Captain Mike Dolan
- John Hamilton as Mr. R.M. Cartell
- Tom Herbert as Holman
- Anthony Warde as Bill Randall
- George J. Lewis as Paul Randall
- Frank J. Scannell as Red Randall
- Ralph Lewis as Steve Randall

== Bibliography ==
- Marshall, Wendy L. William Beaudine: From Silents to Television. Scarecrow Press, 2005.
