= Beatrice Straight =

American actress (1914–2001)

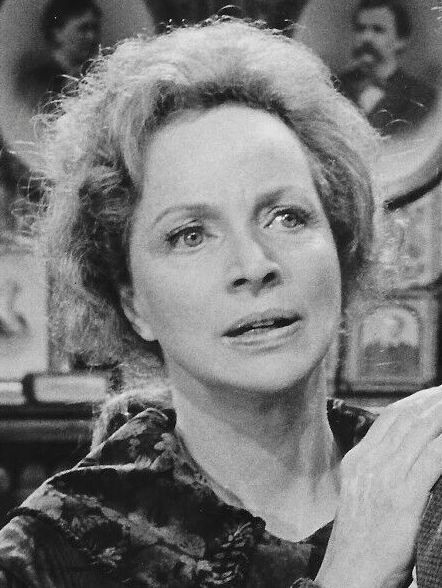
- Straight in the period drama series Beacon Hill, 1975
- Born: Beatrice Whitney Straight; August 2, 1914; Old Westbury, New York, U.S.
- Died: April 7, 2001 (aged 86); Northridge, Los Angeles, California, U.S.
- Education: Cornish School; Actors Studio
- Occupation: Actress
- Years active: 1939–1991
- Spouses: Louis Dolivet (m. 1942; div. 1949) Peter Cookson (m. 1949; died 1990)
- Children: 3
- Parent(s): Willard Dickerman Straight; Dorothy Payne Whitney
- Relatives: Whitney W. Straight (brother); Michael W. Straight (brother)

Beatrice Whitney Straight (August 2, 1914 – April 7, 2001) was an American theatre, film, television and radio actress and a member of the prominent Whitney family. She was both an Academy Award and Tony Award winner, as well as a Primetime Emmy Award nominee.

Straight made her Broadway debut in The Possessed (1939). Her other Broadway roles included Viola in Twelfth Night (1941), Catherine Sloper in The Heiress (1947) and Lady Macduff in Macbeth (1948). For her role as Elizabeth Proctor in the production of The Crucible (1953), she won the Tony Award for Best Featured Actress in a Play. For the satirical film Network (1976), she won the Academy Award for Best Supporting Actress. She also received an Emmy Award nomination for the miniseries The Dain Curse (1978). Straight also appeared as Mother Christophe in The Nun's Story (1959) and as paranormal investigator Dr. Martha Lesh in Poltergeist (1982).

== Early life ==
Beatrice Whitney Straight was born in Old Westbury, New York, the daughter of Dorothy Payne Whitney of the Whitney family, and Willard Dickerman Straight, an investment banker, diplomat, and career U.S. Army officer. Her maternal grandfather was political leader and financier William Collins Whitney. In 1918, when Straight was four years old, her father died in France of influenza during the great epidemic while serving with the United States Army during World War I.

Following her mother's remarriage to British agronomist Leonard K. Elmhirst in 1925, the family moved to Devon, England. It was there that Straight was educated at Dartington Hall and began acting in amateur theater productions. In the 1930s, she attended the Cornish School in Seattle where many of her teachers at Dartington Hall were from and to which both she and her mother became major benefactors.

== Career ==
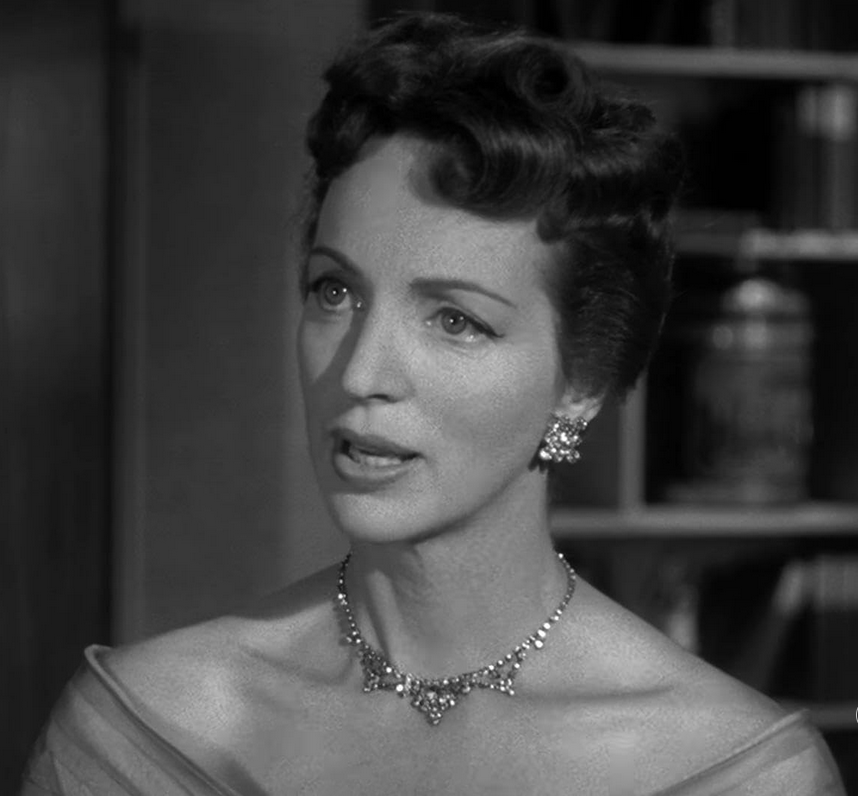
Straight in Patterns (1956)

Straight returned to the United States and made her Broadway debut in the play The Possessed (1939). Most of her theater work was in the classics, including Twelfth Night (1941), Macbeth (1948) and The Crucible (1953), for which she won the Tony Award for Best Featured Actress in a Play. She returned to the New York stage in 1979 to play Gertrude in Hamlet opposite William Hurt.

Straight was a member of the Actors Studio from its inception, attending the class founding member Robert Lewis conducted three times a week; her classmates included Marlon Brando, Montgomery Clift, Jerome Robbins, Sidney Lumet, and about twenty others.

Straight was active in the early days of television, appearing in anthology series such as Armstrong Circle Theatre, Hallmark Hall of Fame, Kraft Television Theatre, Studio One, Suspense, The United States Steel Hour, Playhouse 90, and dramatic series such as Dr. Kildare, Ben Casey, The Defenders, Route 66, Mission: Impossible and St. Elsewhere. Further television performances included the likes of turns in Alfred Hitchcock Presents, as well as her role as Hippolyta in the Wonder Woman series.

Straight worked infrequently in film and is perhaps remembered best for her role as a devastated wife confronting husband William Holden's infidelity in Network (1976). Despite her character only appearing briefly onscreen, Straight was highly praised for her performance, earning the Academy Award for Best Supporting Actress. Another widely seen film appearance was the role of the paranormal investigator Dr. Martha Lesh in the horror film Poltergeist (1982).

== Personal life ==
On February 22, 1942, Straight married Louis Dolivet, Free French Leader, in Polk County, Iowa. At the time, Dolivet was a speaker at the National Farm Institute and Straight was in the middle of the midwest road show of Twelfth Night. Her mother Dorothy Elmhirst and stepfather Leonard K. Elmhirst attended the wedding with her brother Michael Straight and his wife Belinda Crompton.

Dolivet was in the French Air Force until June 1940 and was the co-editor of The Free World, a magazine published by the International Free World Association, of which he was secretary general. At the time of the wedding, her elder brother, Whitney Straight, had been missing since August 1941, when his plane was shot down on the French coast.

Straight obtained a divorce from Dolivet in Reno, Nevada, on May 24, 1949. Together, the couple had one child:

- Willard Whitney Straight Dolivet (1945–1952)

In 1948, while starring in the Broadway production of The Heiress, an adaptation of Henry James's Washington Square, she met Peter Cookson. They married in 1949 and remained married until Cookson's death in 1990. Peter had two children from his previous marriage, Peter W. Cookson Jr. and Jane Coopland (née Cookson). Together, Straight and Cookson had two children:

- Gary Cookson
- Anthony "Tony" Cookson

In 1952, her seven-year-old son, Willard, from her first marriage, accidentally drowned in a pond on their farm in Armonk, New York, while playing in a small rowboat tied to the dock. The boy was found by Cookson. The boy's father, Dolivet, who was living in Paris at the time, was refused a visa and, therefore, unable to fly to the United States to attend the funeral because of his alleged pro-communist activities, which he denied.

Straight reportedly had Alzheimer's disease in her last years. In 2001, she died from pneumonia in Northridge, Los Angeles, at the age of 86.

== Filmography ==
=== Film ===
Title	Year	Role	Notes
Phone Call from a Stranger	1952	Claire Fortness	
Patterns	1956	Nancy Staples	
The Silken Affair	1956	Theora	
The Nun's Story	1959	Mother Christophe (Sanatorium)	
The Young Lovers	1964	Mrs. Burns	
The Garden Party	1973	Mrs. Sheridan	Short film
Network	1976	Louise Schumacher	Academy Award for Best Supporting Actress
The Promise	1979	Marion Hillyard	
Bloodline	1979	Kate Erling	
The Formula	1980	Kay Neeley	
Endless Love	1981	Rose Axelrod	
Poltergeist	1982	Dr. Martha Lesh	
Two of a Kind	1983	Ruth	
Power	1986	Claire Hastings	Nominated – Golden Raspberry Award for Worst Supporting Actress
Deceived	1991	Adrienne's Mother	Final film role
From Russia to Hollywood: The 100-Year Odyssey of Chekhov and Shdanoff	2002	Self	
They Are Here: The Real World of the Poltergeists	2007	Dr. Martha Lesh (uncredited)	Archive footage from Poltergeist

== Television ==
Title	Year	Role	Notes
With This Ring	1951	Self	Season 1, Episode 4: "#1.4" ; Season 1, Episode 5: "#1.5"
Somerset Maugham TV Theatre	1951		Season 1, Episode 12: "The Treasure"
Lights Out	1951	Charlotte	Season 3, Episode 36: "Grey Reminder"
Cosmopolitan Theatre	1951		Season 1, Episode 4: "Reward, One Million"
Hallmark Hall of Fame	1952 (2)	Elizabeth Barrett / Louisa May Alcott	Season 1, Episode 3: "Love Story"; Season 1, Episode 21: "The Magnificent Failure"
The Web	1952		Season 2, Episode 24: "Hear Footsteps"
Armstrong Circle Theatre	1952 (2)		Season 2, Episode 21: "Image"; Season 3, Episode 3: "Betrayal"
Kraft Theatre	1952 (2), 1953		Season 5, Episode 42: "Thorn in the Flesh"; Season 6, Episode 10: "The Iron Gate"; Season 7, Episode 13: "Gavin"
Love Story	1954 (2)		Season 1, Episode 3: "The Matchmaker"; Season 1, Episode 7: "The Yo-Yo People"
Suspense	1952, 1954	Claire Trent / Mrs. de Spain	Season 4, Episode 19: "The Red Signal"; Season 6, Episode 47: "Barn Burning"
Inner Sanctum	1954	Louise	Season 1, Episode 34: "Pattern of Fear"
Omnibus	1953, 1954	Goneril / **	Season 2, Episode 3: "King Lear"; Season 3, Episode 6: "Antigone"
You Are There	1954, 1955	Anne Boleyn / **	Season 2, Episode 42: "The Crisis of Anne Boleyn"; Season 3, Episode 19: "The Torment of Beethoven"
Danger	1955		Season 5, Episode 22: "The Dark Curtain"
Lamp Unto My Feet	1956		Episode aired Oct 28: "Page From a Family Album"
Studio One in Hollywood	1951 (2), 1957	Kay / ** / Pamela Baxter / Deborah	Season 3, Episode 24: "The Target"; Season 3, Episode 29: "A Chill on the Wind"; Season 10, Episode 6: "Act of Mercy"; Season 10, Episode 8; "Bend in the Road"
The United States Steel Hour	1955, 1958	Daisy Jackson / Katherine Grant	Season 2, Episode 17: "The Roads to Home"; Season 5, Episode 15: "Top Secret Mission"
Look Up and Live	1957	Self / Narrator	Episode aired April 21: "The Way of the Cross"
The Investigator	1958	The Widow	Season 1, Episode 7: "#1.7"
Playhouse 90	1958	Grace	Season 3, Episode 5: "Shadows Tremble"
Play of the Week	1959	Mlle. de St. Euverte	Season 1, Episode 6: "The Waltz of the Toreadors"
Alfred Hitchcock Presents	1959, 1960	Cynthia Fortnam / Ida Blythe	Season 5, Episode 10: "Special Delivery"; Season 5, Episode 27: "The Cuckoo Clock"
Diagnosis: Unknown	1960	Rhoda Clarence	Season 1, Episode 4: "Final Performance"
Route 66	1961, 1962, 1963	Kitty Chamberlain / Mother Teresa / Elena De Amundo	Season, 1 Episode 24: "Most Vanquished, Most Victorious"; Season 2, Episode 26: "Kiss the Maiden All Forlorn"; Season 3, Episode 22; "The Cage Around Maria"
Dr. Kildare	1961	Pamela Rainey	Season 1, Episode 10: "For the Living"
Naked City	1962	Ann Johns	Season 3, Episode 32: "Memory of a Trolley Car"
The Doctors and the Nurses	1962	Ruth Martin	Season 1, Episode 10: "The Lady Made of Stone"
The Eleventh Hour	1963	Veronica Filmore	Season 1, Episode 14: "Where Have You Been, Lord Randall, My Son?"
Ben Casey	1963	Edith Bauer	Season 2, Episode 2: "Rigadoon for Three Pianos"
The Defenders	1965	Mrs. Campbell	Season 4, Episode 15: "Eyewitness"
Mission: Impossible	1966	Dr. Martha Richards Zubrovnik	Season 1, Episode 11: "Zubrovnik's Ghost"
Felony Squad	1967	Victoria Cahill	Season 2, Episode 10: "Who'll Take Care of Joey?"
Love of Life	1970	Vinnie Phillips	Season 13, various episodes
Matt Lincoln	1970	Barbara Miller	Season 1, Episode 8: "Doc"
The Wide World of Mystery	1973	Mother	Season 1, Episode 12: "The Haunting of Rosalind"
The Borrowers	1973	Mrs. Crampfurl	TV film
Beacon Hill	1975	Mrs. Hacker	Season 1, Episode 1: "The Pilot"; Season 1, Episode 2: "The Colonel and the Fawn"; Season 1, Episode 3: "The Marblehead Club"; Season 1, Episode 4: "The Poor Little Thing"; Season 1, Episode 5: "The Soldiers"; Season 1, Episode 6: "The Shining Example"; Season 1, Episode 7: "The Speakeasy"; Season 1, Episode:8 "The Million Dollar Gate"; Season 1, Episode 9: "The Suitors"; Season 1, Episode 10 "The Test"; Season 1, Episode 11: "The Pretenders"
Bicentennial Minutes	1976	Self / Narrator	Season 1, Episode 575: "Episode #1.575"
Straight Talk	1977	Self / Guest	Episode aired March 1: "Episode dated 1 March 1977"
The Andros Targets	1977	Mrs. Bendeson	Season 1, Episode 6: "Requiem for a Stolen Child, Part I"
The 49th Annual Academy Awards	1977	Self / Winner	TV special
The World of Darkness	1977	Joanna Sanford	TV film
Wonder Woman	1977	Hippolyta	Season 2, Episode 1: "The Return of Wonder Woman"; Season 2, Episode 4: "The Bermuda Triangle Crisis"
The Mike Douglas Show	1977	Self / Guest	Season 16, Episode 157: "Episode #16.157"
Killer on Board	1977	Beatrice Richmond	TV film
The 50th Annual Academy Awards	1978	Self / Past Winner	TV special
The Dain Curse	1978	Alice Dain Leggett	miniseries; Nominated – Primetime Emmy Award for Outstanding Single Performance by a Supporting Actress in a Comedy or Drama Series
King's Crossing	1982	Louisa Beauchamp	Season 1, Episode 1: "Keepers of the Ring"; Season 1, Episode 2: "Friday's Child"; Season 1, Episode 3: "Ghosts"; Season 1, Episode 4: "Triangle"; Season 1, Episode 5: "Long Ago Tomorrow"; Season 1, Episode 6: "Confusion by Cupid"; Season 1, Episode 7: "The Home Front"; Season 1, Episode 8: "Family Reunion"; Season 1, Episode 9: "One Afternoon"; Season 1, Episode 10: "Strangers"
All-Star Family Feud Special: Heroes vs. Villains	1982	Self / Celebrity Contestant	TV special
Night of 100 Stars	1982	Self	TV special
The Making of "Poltergeist"	1982	Self (uncredited)	TV short film
Faerie Tale Theatre	1984	Queen Veronica / Woman in Museum	Season 3, Episode 2: "The Princess and the Pea"
Robert Kennedy and His Times	1985	Rose Kennedy	miniseries
Chiller	1985	Marion Creighton	TV film
Under Siege	1986	Margaret Sloan	TV film
Jack and Mike	1987	Mike's Mother	Season 1, Episode 18: "Spirits in the Night"
St. Elsewhere	1988	Marjorie Andrews	Season 6, Episode 18: "The Naked Civil Surgeon"; Season 6, Episode 19: "Requiem for a Heavyweight"; Season 6, Episode 20: "Split Decision"
Run Til You Fall	1988	Margaret	TV film
People Like Us	1990	Maisie Verdurin	TV film
8th Annual Screen Actors Guild Awards	2002	Self • In Memoriam (archive footage)	TV special
The 74th Annual Academy Awards	2002	Self • Memorial Tribute (archive footage)	TV special
Shakespeare Uncovered	2015	Goneril (uncredited - archive footage from King Lear)	Season 2, Episode 2: "King Lear with Christopher Plummer"

== Selected theatre credits ==
=== Broadway ===
Title	Date of Production	Role	Notes
Bitter Oleander	Feb. 11, 1935 – Mar. 02, 1935	Spinning Girl	Lyceum Theatre
The Possessed	Oct. 24, 1939 – Nov. 4, 1939	Lisa	Lyceum Theatre
Twelfth Night	Dec. 2, 1941 – Dec. 13, 1941	Viola	Little Theatre
A Happy Ending	c. 1942	-/-	Barbizon-Plaza Concert Hall
Land of Fame	Sep. 21, 1943 – Sep. 25, 1943	Angela	Belasco Theatre
Pygmalion	c. 1945	as producer	Ethel Barrymore Theatre
Playboy of the Western World	c. 1946	as producer	Booth Theatre
The Wanhope Building	Feb. 9, 1947 – Feb. 16, 1947	Felina	Princess Theatre
The Heiress	Sep. 29, 1947 – Sep. 18, 1948	Catherine Sloper	Biltmore Theatre; Casting replacement
Eastward in Eden	Nov. 18, 1947 – Nov. 29, 1947	Emily Dickinson	Royale Theatre
Macbeth	Mar. 31, 1948 – Apr. 24, 1948	Lady Macduff	National Theatre
The Innocents	Feb. 1, 1950 – Jun. 3, 1950	Miss Giddens	Playhouse Theatre
The Grand Tour	Dec. 10, 1951 – Dec. 15, 1951	Nell Valentine	Martin Beck Theatre
The Crucible	Jan. 22, 1953 – Jul. 11, 1953	Elizabeth Proctor	Martin Beck Theatre; Tony Award for Best Featured Actress in a Play
Everything in the Garden	Nov. 29, 1967 – Feb. 10, 1968	Mrs. Toothe	Plymouth Theatre
Who Am I?	1971-1973	as director	Young World Foundation Theatre Company

=== Off-Broadway ===
Title	Date of Production	Role	Notes
Henry IV, Part I	c. 1946	as producer	Century Theatre (also produced in the U.K.)
Henry IV, Part II	c. 1946	as producer	Century Theatre (also produced in the U.K.)
Uncle Vanya	c. 1946	as producer	Century Theatre (also produced in the U.K.)
Oedipus	c. 1946	as producer	Century Theatre (also produced in the U.K.)
The Critic	c. 1946	as producer	Century Theatre (also produced in the U.K.)
Sing Me No Lullaby	c. 1954	-/-	Phoenix Theatre
The River Line	Jan. 2, 1957 - Jan. 13, 1957	Marie Chassaigne	Carnegie Hall Playhouse
Phedre	Feb. 10, 1966 - May 8, 1966	Phedre	Greenwich Mews Theatre
Ghosts	Mar. 13, 1973 - May 27, 1973	Mrs. Helene Alving	Roundabout Stage II
All My Sons	Sep. 27, 1974 - Nov. 17, 1974	Kate Keller	Roundabout Stage (23rd Street Theatre)
Hamlet	Dec. 12, 1979 - Feb. 10, 1980	Gertrude	Circle Theatre

=== Other stage credits ===
Title	Date of Production	Role	Notes
Henry IV, Part I	c. 1946	as producer	The Old Vic Theatre - London, U.K. (also produced in the U.S.)
Henry IV, Part II	c. 1946	as producer	The Old Vic Theatre - London, U.K. (also produced in the U.S.)
Uncle Vanya	c. 1946	as producer	The Old Vic Theatre - London, U.K. (also produced in the U.S.)
Oedipus	c. 1946	as producer	The Old Vic Theatre - London, U.K. (also produced in the U.S.)
The Critic	c. 1946	as producer	The Old Vic Theatre - London, U.K. (also produced in the U.S.)
A Streetcar Named Desire	c. 1967, 1969-1970	Blanche du Bois	Berkshire Theatre Festival - Stockbridge, MA; various other U.S. cities during the production's tour
The Right Honorable Gentleman	c. 1971	Mrs. Lila Rossiter	The Cape Playhouse - Dennis, MA; Ogunquit Playhouse - Ogunquit, ME; various other U.S. cities during the production's tour
The Palace at 4 A.M.	c. 1972	The Mother	John Drew Theatre - Easthampton, NY
Old Times	c. 1977	Kate	Academy Festival Theatre - Lake Forest, IL

== Selected radio credits ==
Title	Date of Production	Role	Notes
Great Scenes from Great Plays	October 15, 1948	Elizabeth Barrett	Program #3: "The Barretts of Wimpole Street"
Lights Out	April 30, 1951	Charlotte	Season 3, Episode 36: "Grey Reminder"
Suspense	January 22, 1952	Claire Trent	Season 4, Episode 19: "The Red Signal"
CBS Radio Mystery Theater	March 20, 1974	Alice Emery	Season 1, Episode 60: "#60 — Ghost at the Gate"
CBS Radio Mystery Theater	July 25, 1974	Sybil Carter	Season 1, Episode 123: "#123 — My Sister, Death"
CBS Radio Mystery Theater	January 20, 1975	Mrs. Vortic	Season 2, Episode 15: "#208 — The Precious Killer"
CBS Radio Mystery Theater	May 12, 1975	Jesse Craig	Season 2, Episode 79: "#272 — For Tomorrow We Die"
CBS Radio Mystery Theater	February 26, 1976	Ellen Gardner	Season 3, Episode 33: "#438 — The Providential Ghost"

== Accolades ==
Year	Award	Category	Nominated work	Results	Ref.
1976	Academy Awards	Best Supporting Actress	Network	Won	
1986	Golden Raspberry Awards	Worst Supporting Actress	Power	Nominated	
1978	Primetime Emmy Awards	Outstanding Single Performance by a Supporting Actress in a Comedy or Drama Series	The Dain Curse	Nominated	
1953	Tony Awards	Distinguished Supporting or Featured Dramatic Actress	The Crucible	Won	
