= Behind City Lights =

1945 film by John English

- Theatrical release poster
- Directed by: John English
- Screenplay by: Richard Weil; Gertrude Walker
- Story by: Vicki Baum
- Produced by: Joseph Bercholz
- Starring: Lynne Roberts; Peter Cookson; Jerome Cowan; Esther Dale; William Terry; Victor Kilian
- Cinematography: William Bradford
- Edited by: Fred Allen
- Music by: Joseph Dubin
- Production company: Republic Pictures
- Distributed by: Republic Pictures
- Release date: September 10, 1945
- Running time: 68 minutes
- Country: United States
- Language: English

Behind City Lights is a 1945 American crime film directed by John English and written by Richard Weil and Gertrude Walker. The film stars Lynne Roberts, Peter Cookson, Jerome Cowan, Esther Dale, William Terry and Victor Kilian. The film was released on September 10, 1945, by Republic Pictures.

== Plot ==
Small-town girl Jean Lowell is about to wed farmer Ben Coleman, but secretly longs for big-city lights and a more exciting life. A car crash outside the church causes a commotion, and the injured party, a New Yorker by the name of Lance Marlow, is instantly smitten with Jean. The wedding is called off after Ben senses that Jean is distracted. Lance and his partner Perry Borden continue on to New York City, and before long Jean convinces herself that she should follow.

She finds the men and goes with them to a nightclub, where Perry makes fun of her small-town ways and, unbeknownst to her, steals a valuable necklace. Lance and Perry are thieves. Lance intends to quit so that he and Jean can begin a new life, but she takes a gift from him to a jeweler and discovers it is stolen. Things go from bad to worse when Lance is killed. A distraught Jean takes a job working at a diner, but regains happiness when Ben turns up and invites her to return where she belongs.

== Cast ==
- Lynne Roberts as Jean Lowell
- Peter Cookson as Lance Marlow
- Jerome Cowan as Perry Borden
- Esther Dale as Sarah Lowell
- William Terry as Ben Coleman
- Victor Kilian as Daniel Lowell
- Moroni Olsen as Curtis Holbrook
- William Forrest as Detective Peterson
- Emmett Vogan as Jones
- Joseph J. Greene as Gabriel 'Gab' Carson
- Frank J. Scannell as Charles Matthews
- Tom London as Andrew Coleman
- George M. Carleton as Doctor Blodgett
- Bud Geary as Fred Haskins
- Jeanne Staff as Night Club Singer
