= Strange Conquest =

1946 film directed by John Rawlins

- Theatrical release poster
- Directed by: John Rawlins
- Screenplay by: Roy Chanslor
- Story by: Lester Cole; Carl Dreher
- Produced by: Marshall Grant
- Starring: Jane Wyatt; Lowell Gilmore; Julie Bishop; Peter Cookson; Milburn Stone; Samuel S. Hinds
- Cinematography: Charles Van Enger
- Edited by: Philip Cahn
- Production company: Universal Pictures
- Distributed by: Universal Pictures
- Release date: May 10, 1946
- Running time: 63 minutes
- Country: United States
- Language: English

Strange Conquest is a 1946 American drama film directed by John Rawlins and written by Roy Chanslor. The film stars Jane Wyatt, Lowell Gilmore, Julie Bishop, Peter Cookson, Milburn Stone, Samuel S. Hinds and Abner Biberman. The film was released on May 10, 1946, by Universal Pictures.

== Cast ==
- Jane Wyatt as Dr. Mary Palmer
- Lowell Gilmore as Dr. Paul Harris
- Julie Bishop as Virginia Sommers
- Peter Cookson as William Sommers
- Milburn Stone as Bert Morrow
- Samuel S. Hinds as Dr. Graves
- Abner Biberman as Molugi
