= Russell Hardie =

American actor (1904–1973)

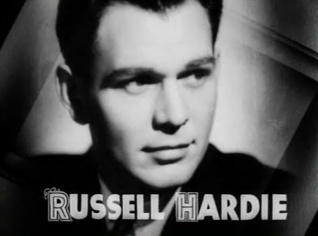
- Hardie in Broadway to Hollywood (1933)
- Born: William Russell Hardie; May 21, 1904; Buffalo, New York U.S.
- Died: July 21, 1973 (aged 69); Clarence, New York U.S.
- Occupation: Actor
- Years active: 1929–1966

William Russell Hardie (May 20, 1904 or May 21, 1904 – July 21, 1973) was an American film actor.

== Early years ==
Hardie was born in Griffins Mills, New York, or Buffalo, New York. He was the son of William and Katherine Hardie (nee Katherine Pauly). Growing up, Hardie's family lived near the Roycroft community, and, although his father was a blacksmith, his career interests varied as he saw different craftspeople there demonstrate their skills. He quit school to work for his father, who eventually advised him to find another career because of the limited number of horses in Buffalo.

Hardie continued his education in night school, studying shorthand and stenography. He worked briefly as a stenographer in the Erie Railroad's freight offices before he was made an office boy. More night school led to his becoming a full-fledged secretary. He left the railroad to work at a Ford plant but soon lost that job. His first involvement with acting came when he had a small part in a play while he worked for a stock theater company as its secretary. After two years that company failed, and he began selling vacuum cleaners.

== Career ==
Hardie moved to New York with $85 borrowed from his mother. When that money was gone, he found work with a stock theater company, after which he worked with stock troupes in Kansas City, Missouri; Memphis, Tennessee; and Greenwich, Connecticut. Following those engagements he made his Broadway debut in The Criminal Code, which ran for eight months in New York City and three months on the road. He portrayed Bayard in the 1939 Broadway cast of The Primrose Path.

He appeared in twenty-seven moving pictures between 1930 and 1966, including an uncredited part in Camille in 1936 and as a Pentagon general in Fail Safe in 1964.

== Death ==
He died on July 21, 1973, in Clarence, New York at age 69.

== Filmography ==
Year	Title	Role	Notes
1930	The Costello Case	Jimmie	
1933	Broadway to Hollywood	Ted Hackett Jr.	
1933	Stage Mother	Fred Lorraine	
1933	Christopher Bean	Warren Creamer	
1934	As the Earth Turns	Ed	
1934	Men in White	Dr. Michaelson	
1934	Operator 13	Lt. Gus Littledale	
1934	Murder in the Private Car	John Blake	
1934	Pursued	David Landeen	
1934	Hell in the Heavens	2nd Lt. Hartley	
1934	The Band Plays On	Mike O'Brien	
1934	Sequoia	Bob Alden	
1935	West Point of the Air	Phil Carter	
1935	Speed Devils	Dan Holden	
1935	In Old Kentucky	Dr. Lee Andrews	
1936	The Harvester	David Langston	
1936	Down to the Sea	John Kaminas	
1936	Meet Nero Wolfe	Manuel Kimball	
1936	Killer at Large	Tommy Braddock	
1936	Camille	Gustave	Uncredited
1951	The Frogmen	Capt. Radford	Uncredited
1951	The Whistle at Eaton Falls	Dwight Hawkins	
1958	Cop Hater	Detective Lt. Byrnes	
1964	Fail Safe	Gen. Stark	
1966	The Group	Mr. Davison	(final film role)
