= The Girl Who Dared =

1944 film by Howard Bretherton

- Theatrical release poster
- Directed by: Howard Bretherton
- Screenplay by: John K. Butler
- Story by: Medora Field
- Produced by: Rudolph E. Abel
- Starring: Lorna Gray; Peter Cookson; Grant Withers; Veda Ann Borg; John Hamilton; Willie Best
- Cinematography: Bud Thackery
- Edited by: Arthur Roberts
- Production company: Republic Pictures
- Distributed by: Republic Pictures
- Release date: August 5, 1944
- Running time: 56 minutes
- Country: United States
- Language: English

The Girl Who Dared is a 1944 American mystery film directed by Howard Bretherton and written by John K. Butler. It is based on the 1942 novel "Blood On Her Shoe" by Medora Field. The film stars Lorna Gray, Peter Cookson, Grant Withers, Veda Ann Borg, John Hamilton and Willie Best. The film was released on August 5, 1944, by Republic Pictures.

== Plot ==
Several people are sent mysterious invitations to attend a ghost hunt at their friend's manor on a remote island. Upon arriving, they find their friend did not send out the invitations and does not know who did, but he makes arrangements to put them all up for the night. As part of the fun, they all head to the water to see the ruins of a 100-year-old ship wreck. When they see the ghostly image of the ancient ship captain, one of the women faints; they quickly discover she's been stabbed to death. They return to the manor and attempt to call the police, but the phone line is cut before the call can go through. The killer has also incapacitated all their vehicles. Meanwhile, they hear on the news that a local doctor has stolen radium from the hospital and is on the run. Stranded on the island, more dead bodies turn up. The party are all under suspicion as they try to determine why these murders were committed and by whom.

== Cast ==
- Lorna Gray as Ann Carroll
- Peter Cookson as Rufus Blair
- Grant Withers as Homer Norton
- Veda Ann Borg as Cynthia Harrison / Sylvia Scott
- John Hamilton as Beau Richmond
- Willie Best as Woodrow
- Vivien Oakland as Chattie Richmond
- Roy Barcroft as David Scott
- Kirk Alyn as Josh Carroll
- Kenne Duncan as Dr. Paul Dexter
