= Veda Ann Borg =

American actress (1915–1973)

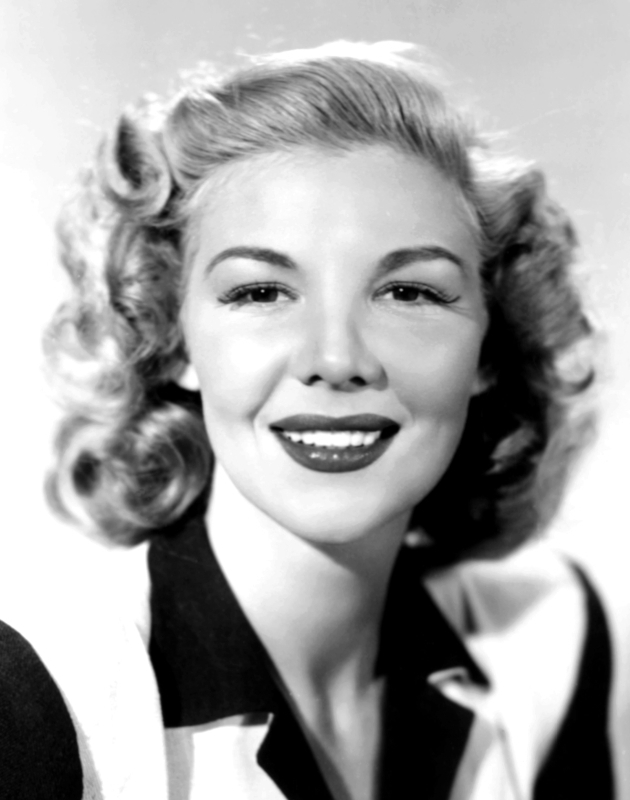
- Ann Borg in 1940
- Born: January 11, 1915; Boston, Massachusetts, U.S.
- Died: August 16, 1973 (aged 58); Hollywood, California U.S.
- Other name: Ann Noble
- Years active: 1936–1963
- Spouses: Paul Herrick (m. 1942; div. 1942) Andrew V. McLaglen (m. 1946; div. 1958)
- Children: 1

Veda Ann Borg (January 11, 1915 – August 16, 1973) was an American film and television actress.

== Early years ==
Borg was born in Boston, Massachusetts, to Gottfried Borg, a Swedish immigrant, and Minna Noble. She became a model in 1936 before winning a contract at Paramount Pictures. An item in a 1936 newspaper described her as a "former New York and Boston manakin" when her signing with Paramount was announced.

== Film ==
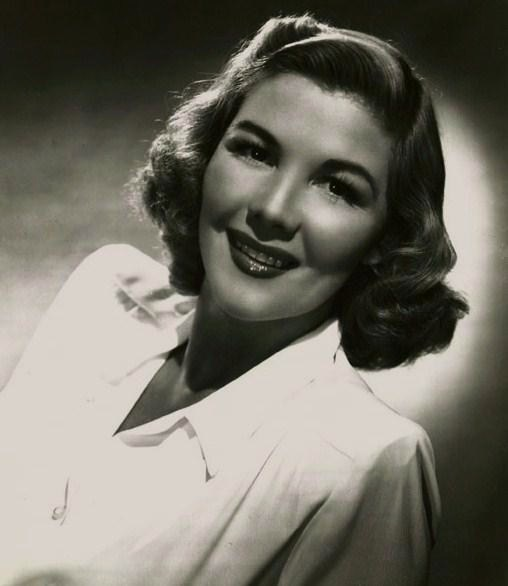
Veda Ann Borg in Blonde Savage (1947)

Soon after Borg signed her contract with Paramount, studio officials decided to change her name to Ann Noble for her work in films. However, a newspaper article reported, "Miss Borg contended that her own name is more descriptive of her personality than Ann Noble." Her argument was successful, and she retained her name.

She appeared in more than 100 films, including Mildred Pierce, Chicken Every Sunday, Love Me or Leave Me, Guys and Dolls, Thunder in the Sun, You're Never Too Young, and The Alamo (1960), in which she portrayed the blind Nell Robertson, who dramatically coaxes her husband, Jocko (John Dierkes) to remain at the Alamo rather than leaving to care for her, knowing his death was probable.

== Television ==
Borg began accepting parts in television when the new medium opened up. From 1952 through 1961, she appeared on shows such as Alfred Hitchcock Presents, General Electric Theater, The 20th Century-Fox Hour, The Abbott and Costello Show, The Restless Gun, Bonanza, The Red Skelton Show, Adventures of Superman, Wild Bill Hickok, and Mr. & Mrs. North, among many others. In early 1953, she was the first actress cast as "Honeybee Gillis" in The Life of Riley TV series, replaced a short time later by first Marie Brown, then Gloria Blondell.

== Personal life ==
A car crash in 1939 required surgical reconstruction of Borg's face.

Borg was married briefly to Paul Herrick (1942). On May 11, 1946, she married film director Andrew McLaglen (1946–1958), with whom she had a son: Andrew Victor McLaglen II. She and McLaglen were divorced on June 13, 1958.

Borg died of cancer in Hollywood in 1973, aged 58. She was cremated and her ashes scattered at sea.

== Partial filmography ==
- Three Cheers for Love (1936) - Consuelo Dormant
- Men in Exile (1937) - Rita Crane
- San Quentin (1937) - Helen
- Kid Galahad (1937) - The Redhead
- The Case of the Stuttering Bishop (1937) - Gladys
- The Singing Marine (1937) - Diane
- Public Wedding (1937) - Bernice
- Marry the Girl (1937) - Nurse with Cartoon on Uniform
- Confession (1937) - Xenia
- Varsity Show (1937) - Passerby (uncredited)
- It's Love I'm After (1937) - Elsie
- Alcatraz Island (1937) - The Red Head
- Submarine D-1 (1937) - Dolly
- Missing Witnesses (1937) - Miss Friday (uncredited)
- She Loved a Fireman (1937) - Betty Williams
- Over the Wall (1938) - Maxine
- The Law Comes to Texas (1939) - Dora Lewis
- Miracle on Main Street (1939) - Flo
- The Shadow (1940, Serial) - Margot Lane
- Cafe Hostess (1940) - Cafe Hostess (uncredited)
- I Take This Oath (1940) - Flo
- Dr. Christian Meets the Women (1940) - Carol Compton
- Laughing at Danger (1940) - Celeste
- Glamour for Sale (1940) - Lucille
- Hit Parade of 1941 (1940) - (uncredited)
- Police Rookie (1940) - Flo (credited as Veda van Borg)
- Bitter Sweet (1940) - Manon
- Melody Ranch (1940) - Receptionist (uncredited)
- Behind the News (1940) - Bessie
- Arkansas Judge (1941) - Hettie Huston
- The Penalty (1941) - Julie
- I'll Wait for You (1941) - Manicurist (uncredited)
- The Get-Away (1941) - Black's Blonde Dance Hall Pickup (uncredited)
- The Pittsburgh Kid (1941) - Barbara Ellison
- Down in San Diego (1941) - Cashier (uncredited)
- Honky Tonk (1941) - Pearl
- The Corsican Brothers (1941) - Maria
- Duke of the Navy (1942) - Maureen
- Two Yanks in Trinidad (1942) - Bubbles
- She's in the Army (1942) - Diane Jordan
- I Married an Angel (1942) - Ilona Prohaska (uncredited)
- Sherlock Holmes and the Secret Weapon (1942) - Bar Singer (voice, uncredited)
- Something to Shout About (1943) - Flo Bentley
- Murder in Times Square (1943) - Fiona Maclair
- False Faces (1943) - Joyce Ford
- Isle of Forgotten Sins (1943) - Luana
- Revenge of the Zombies (1943) - Lila Von Altermann
- The Girl from Monterrey (1943) - Flossie Rankin
- The Unknown Guest (1943) - Helen Walker
- Smart Guy (1943) - Lee
- Standing Room Only (1944) - Peggy Fuller
- Detective Kitty O'Day (1944) - Mrs. Wentworth
- Marked Trails (1944) - Blanche - aka Mary Conway, aka Susanna
- The Girl Who Dared (1944) - Cynthia Harrison / Sylvia Scott
- The Big Noise (1944) - Mayme Charlton
- Irish Eyes Are Smiling (1944) - Belle La Tour
- The Falcon in Hollywood (1944) - Billie Atkins
- What a Blonde (1945) - Pat Campbell
- Fog Island (1945) - Sylvia
- Bring On the Girls (1945) - Girl at Bar with Phil (uncredited)
- Rough, Tough and Ready (1945) - Lorine Gray
- Don Juan Quilligan (1945) - Beattle LaRue
- Scared Stiff (1945) - Flo Rosson
- Dangerous Intruder (1945) - Jenny
- Jungle Raiders (1945, Serial) - Cora Bell
- Love, Honor and Goodbye (1945) - Marge
- Mildred Pierce (1945) - Miriam Ellis
- Life with Blondie (1945) - Hazel
- Avalanche (1946) - Claire Jeremy
- Big Town (1946) - Vivian LeRoy
- Accomplice (1946) - Joyce Kimball Bonniwell
- Wife Wanted (1946) - Nola Reed
- The Fabulous Suzanne (1946) - Mary
- The Pilgrim Lady (1947) - Eve Standish
- The Bachelor and the Bobby-Soxer (1947) - Agnes Prescott
- Mother Wore Tights (1947) - Rosemary Olcott
- Blonde Savage (1947) - Connie Harper
- Julia Misbehaves (1948) - Louise
- Chicken Every Sunday (1949) - Rita Kirby
- Mississippi Rhythm (1949) - Jeanette
- One Last Fling (1949) - Gaye Winston Lardner
- Forgotten Women (1949) - Clair Dunning
- Rider from Tucson (1950) - Gypsy Avery
- The Kangaroo Kid (1950) - Stella Grey
- Hold That Line (1952) - Candy Calin
- Aaron Slick from Punkin Crick (1952) - Girl in Red
- Big Jim McLain (1952) - Madge
- A Perilous Journey (1953) - Sadie
- Mister Scoutmaster (1953) - Blonde
- Hot News (1953) - Doris Burton
- Three Sailors and a Girl (1953) - Faye Foss
- Bitter Creek (1954) - Whitey
- Love Me or Leave Me (1955) - Dance Hall Hostess (uncredited)
- You're Never Too Young (1955) - Mrs. Noonan
- Guys and Dolls (1955) - Laverne
- I'll Cry Tomorrow (1955) - Waitress (uncredited)
- Alfred Hitchcock Presents (1956) (Season 1 Episode 36 "Mink") - Lucille
- Frontier Gambler (1956) - Francie Merritt
- Naked Gun (1956) - Susan Stark
- The Wings of Eagles (1957) - (uncredited)
- The Restless Gun (1958) - Episode "Mercyday"
- The Fearmakers (1958) - Vivian Loder
- Thunder in the Sun (1959) - Marie (uncredited)
- The Alamo (1960) - Blind Nell Robertson
