= Rudolph E. Abel =

American film and television producer

- Born: May 30, 1902; Maxwell, California, United States
- Died: December 31, 1974 (aged 72); Santa Barbara, California, United States
- Occupation: Producer
- Years active: 1939–1968 (film & TV)

Rudolph E. Abel (May 30, 1902 – December 31, 1974) was an American film and television producer.

== Selected filmography ==
- The Girl Who Dared (1944)
- Girls of the Big House (1945)
- A Sporting Chance (1945)
- The Fatal Witness (1945)

== Bibliography ==
- Len D. Martin. The Republic Pictures Checklist: Features, Serials, Cartoons, Short Subjects and Training Films of Republic Pictures Corporation, 1935-1959. McFarland, 1998.
