= Robert H. Harris =

American actor

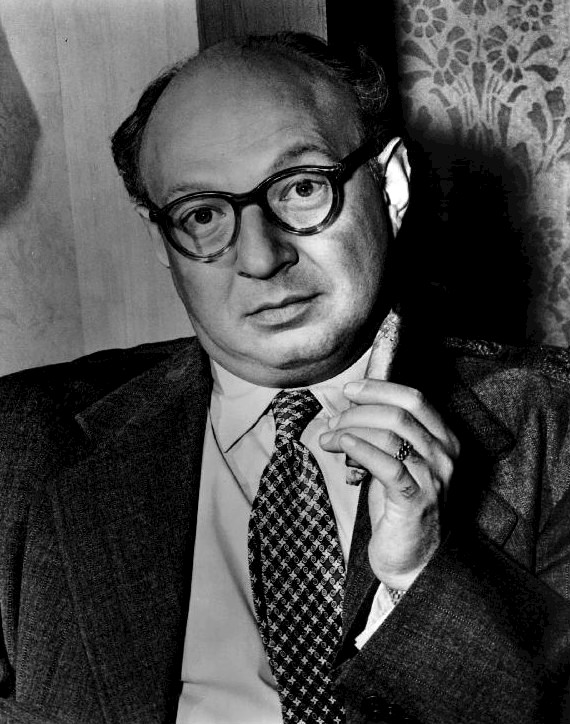
- as Jake Goldberg in 1954
- Born: Robert H. Hurwitz; July 15, 1911; Manhattan, New York City, U.S.
- Died: November 30, 1981 (aged 70); Los Angeles, California, U.S.
- Other name: Robert Harris
- Years active: 1950-1977
- Spouse(s): Louise Lewis; Viola Harris (?–1981)
- Children: 1

Robert H. Harris (born Robert H. Hurwitz; July 15, 1911 – November 30, 1981) was an American actor.

== Early years ==
Harris was born in New York City in 1911, the son of "a well-known rabbi, scholar and author". He attended DeWitt Clinton High School. With his father's encouragement, he pursued a career in entertainment.

== Stage ==
Harris completed an operetta when he was 18. A producer rejected it but cast him as a 60-year-old man in a production. This development turned Harris's focus from writing to performing.

A veteran of the Yiddish Art Theater from his teens, Harris made his first Broadway appearance in 1937 in Schoolhouse on the Lot. His other Broadway credits include Xmas in Las Vegas (1965), Minor Miracle (1965), Foxy (1963), Look, Ma, I'm Dancin'! (1947), and Brooklyn, U.S.A. (1941).

Harris spent 1949 and 1950 with the Deertrees Theatre in Harrison, Maine, primarily directing as well as acting in some productions.

In 1952, Harris was the managing director of the Woodstock Playhouse in Woodstock, New York. Previously, he had directed repertory theater in Boston and Hollywood.

Harris created and acted in Raisins and Almonds, which was presented in March 1967 in the Actors Theater in Beverly Hills, California.

== Television ==
From 1950, he appeared extensively on television series, specializing in playing shady, sometimes evil characters, roles for which he excelled. From 1953 to 1956 he played Jake Goldberg in The Goldbergs, one of his few sympathetic roles. (His obituary distributed via United Press International wrote that he played the role of Jake Goldberg in 1953-1954.) In 1957, Harris played the lead role in The Court of Last Resort.

He also made many guest appearances in many other TV series. These include eight appearances in Alfred Hitchcock Presents from 1956 to 1961 and seven appearances in Perry Mason from 1958 to 1965, including in the 1962 episode "The Case of the Dodging Domino". Among his seven appearances, he played the murderer three times, the murder victim once, and the defendant once. He also appeared in Peter Gunn, 77 Sunset Strip, Gunsmoke, Ben Casey, The Asphalt Jungle, Land of the Giants, and Rawhide. He also appeared in the first season of Barnaby Jones in the episode "Twenty Million Alibis".

== Film ==
He starred in the 1958 B-movie horror film How to Make a Monster and had notable appearances in Elia Kazan's 1963 film America America and in Edward Dmytryk's 1965 film Mirage. His other film credits included roles in Bundle of Joy (1956), The Invisible Boy (1957), Peyton Place (1957), The George Raft Story (1961), Apache Uprising (1965), Valley of the Dolls (1967), How Awful About Allan (1970), The Great Northfield Minnesota Raid (1972), and The Man in the Glass Booth (1975).

== Personal life and death ==
Harris and his wife Viola Harris had a son, Steven Lee, and a daughter, Sunny Dee. Harris died November 30, 1981.

== Filmography ==
Year	Title	Role	Notes
1948	The Naked City	Druggist	Uncredited
1956	Alfred Hitchcock Presents	Clarence Fox	Season 1 Episode 18 ("Shopping For Death")
1956	Alfred Hitchcock Presents	Laurence Appelby	Season 1 Episode 29 ("The Orderly World of Mr. Appelby")
1956	Alfred Hitchcock Presents	John Hurley	Season 1 Episode 34 ("The Hidden Thing")
1956	Alfred Hitchcock Presents	Albert Birch	Season 2 Episode 6 ("Toby")
1956	Gunsmoke	Ben Pitcher	Season 2 Episode 1 ("Cow Doctor")
1956	Bundle of Joy	Mr. Hargraves	
1957	Alfred Hitchcock Presents	Bellefontaine	Season 2 Episode 39 ("The Dangerous People")
1957	The Big Caper	Zimmer	
1957	The Invisible Boy	Professor Frank Allerton	
1957	The Fuzzy Pink Nightgown	Barney Baylies	
1957	No Down Payment	Markham	
1957	Peyton Place	Seth Bushwell	
1958	Alfred Hitchcock Presents	George C. Piper	Season 3 Episode 36 ("The Safe Place")
1958	How to Make a Monster	Pete Dumond	
1959	Alfred Hitchcock Presents	Ben Prowdy	Season 5 Episode 14 ("Graduating Class")
1961	Alfred Hitchcock Presents	Morty Lenton	Season 6 Episode 18 ("The Greatest Monster of Them All")
1961	Operation Eichmann	Minor Role	Uncredited
1961	Twenty Plus Two	Stanley	Uncredited
1961	The George Raft Story	Harvey	
1961	The Lawbreakers	Joe Selkin	
1962	Convicts 4	Commissioner	
1963	America America	Aratoon Kebabian	
1964	The Alfred Hitchcock Hour	Dr. Robert J. Perrigan	Season 3 Episode 11 ("Consider Her Ways")
1964	Nightmare in Chicago	Officer Newman	
1965	Mirage	Dr. Augustus J. Broden	
1965	Apache Uprising	Hoyt Taylor	
1967	Valley of the Dolls	Henry Bellamy	
1968	The Virginian	the Doctor	Season 6 Episode 23 ("Stacy")
1970	How Awful About Allan	Dr. Ellins	ABC Movie of the Week
1972	The Great Northfield Minnesota Raid	Wilcox	
1975	The Man in the Glass Booth	Dr. Weisburger	

== Series in detail ==
Appearances in Alfred Hitchcock Presents

- "Mr. Fox" in episode: Shopping for Death, first broadcast on January 29, 1956 (episode # 1.18).
- "Laurence Appleby" in episode: The Orderly World of Mr. Appleby, first broadcast on April 15, 1956 (episode # 1.29).
- "John Hurley" in episode: The Hidden Thing, first broadcast on May 20, 1956 (episode # 1.34).
- "Albert Birch" in episode: Toby, first broadcast on November 4, 1956 (episode # 2.6).
- "LaFontaine" in episode: The Dangerous People, first broadcast on June 23, 1957 (episode # 2.39).
- "George Piper" in episode: The Safe Place, first broadcast on June 8, 1958 (episode # 3.36).
- "Ben Prowdy" in episode: Graduating Class, first broadcast on December 27, 1959 (episode # 5.14).
- "Morty Lenton" in episode: The Greatest Monster of Them All, first broadcast on February 14, 1961 (episode # 6.18).

Appearances in The Alfred Hitchcock Hour

- "Dr. Perrigan" in episode: Consider Her Ways, first broadcast on December 28, 1964 (episode # 3.11).

Appearances in The Virginian

- "The doctor" in episode: "Stacey", first broadcast on February 2, 1968 (episode # 6.23).

Appearance in Voyage to the Bottom of the Sea

- "Dr. Eric Carlton" in episode "The Sky Is Falling (1966)"

Appearances in Perry Mason

- "Edmund Lacey" in episode: The Case of the Lonely Heiress, first broadcast on February 1, 1958 (episode # 1.20).
- "Aaron Hubble" in episode: The Case of "The Purple Woman", first broadcast on December 6, 1958 (episode # 2.9).
- "Gordon Russell" in episode: The Case of the Slandered Submarine, first broadcast on May 14, 1960 (episode # 3.23).
- "Claude Demay" in episode: The Case of the Torrid Tapestry first broadcast on April 22, 1961 (episode # 4.23).
- "Jerry Janda" in episode: The Case of the Dodging Domino first broadcast on November 1, 1962 (episode # 5.8).
- "Harry Bronson" in episode: The Case of the Frustrated Folksinger, first broadcast on January 7, 1965 (episode # 8.15).
- "Marty Webb" in episode: The Case of the Runaway Racer, first broadcast on November 14, 1965 (episode # 9.10).

Appearances in Gunsmoke

- "Ben Pitcher" in episode: Cow Doctor, first broadcast on September 8, 1956 (episode # 2.1).
- "Fred Myers" in episode: Kick Me, first broadcast on January 26, 1957 (episode # 2.18).

Appearances in The Man from U.N.C.L.E.

- "Dr. Janos Hrandy" in episode: The Love Affair, first broadcast on March 29, 1965 (episode # 1.26).
- "Mark Ole" in episode: The Pop Art Affair, first broadcast on October 7, 1966 (episode # 3.6).

Appearances in The Untouchables

- "Phil Corbin" in episode: Kiss of Death Girl, first broadcast on December 8, 1960 (episode # 3.6).

Appearances in Suspense

- episode: Escape This Night, first broadcast on February 7, 1950 (episode # 2.23).
- episode: Dark Shadows, first broadcast on September 19, 1950 (episode # 3.4).
- episode: The Juiceman (episode # 3.34).
- episode: Night Drive, first broadcast on February 26, 1952 (episode # 4.24).

Appearances in Climax!

- episode: Flight 951, first broadcast on April 21, 1955 (episode # 1.22).
- appearing as Robert Harris playing "Porfear" in episode: No Right to Kill, first broadcast on August 9, 1956 (episode # 2.42).
- episode: The Secret of the Red Room first broadcast on September 12, 1957 (episode # 3.44).

Appearances in Bonanza

- Jacob J. Dormann in episode: "The Legacy", first broadcast on December 15, 1963 (episode # 5.11).
