= Down to the Sea =

1936 American drama film by Lewis D. Collins

- Theatrical release poster
- Directed by: Lewis D. Collins
- Screenplay by: Robert Lee Johnson; Wellyn Totman
- Produced by: Nat Levine
- Starring: Russell Hardie; Ben Lyon; Ann Rutherford; Irving Pichel; Fritz Leiber; Vince Barnett
- Cinematography: Harry Neumann
- Edited by: Charles Craft
- Music by: Arthur Kay
- Production company: Republic Pictures
- Distributed by: Republic Pictures
- Release date: May 30, 1936
- Running time: 69 minutes
- Country: United States
- Language: English

Down to the Sea is a 1936 American drama film directed by Lewis D. Collins and written by Robert Lee Johnson and Wellyn Totman. The film stars Russell Hardie, Ben Lyon, Ann Rutherford, Irving Pichel, Fritz Leiber and Vince Barnett. The film was released on May 30, 1936, by Republic Pictures.

== Cast ==
- Russell Hardie as John Kaminas
- Ben Lyon as Steve Londos
- Ann Rutherford as Helen Pappas
- Irving Pichel as Alex Fotakis
- Fritz Leiber as Gregory Pappas
- Vince Barnett as Hector
- Maurice Murphy as Luis
- Nigel De Brulier as Demetrius
- Paul Porcasi as Vasilios
- Victor Potel as Andy
- Karl Hackett as Joe
- Francisco Marán as George
- Frank Yaconelli as Pete
- Mike Tellegen as Cimos
- John Picorri as Greek Proprietor
