= G. I. Honeymoon =

1945 film by Phil Karlson

G.I. Honeymoon
- Directed by: Phil Karlson
- Written by: Richard Weil; Tim Ryan
- Story by: A.J. Rubien; Robert Chapin; Marion Page Johnson
- Starring: Gale Storm
- Cinematography: Harry Neumann
- Edited by: William Austin
- Production company: Monogram Pictures
- Distributed by: Monogram Pictures
- Release date: April 6, 1945
- Running time: 70 minutes
- Country: United States
- Language: English

G.I. Honeymoon is a 1945 film directed by Phil Karlson. It stars Gale Storm and Peter Cookson. Both play a couple who encounter problems as the husband wants to leave the army, but can't. It was nominated for an Academy Award in 1946 for its music.

== Cast ==
- Gale Storm as Ann Gordon
- Peter Cookson as Lt. Robert 'Bob' Gordon
- Arline Judge as Flo LaVerne
- Frank Jenks as Horace P. 'Blubber' Malloy
- Jerome Cowan as Ace Renaldo

== Production ==
Karlson did not like his first film as director for Monogram, calling it "probably the worst picture ever made." However, before it was released "they had given me another story that I flipped over. Oh, I knew this was surefire. So I got into production as fast as I could with the second picture and the second picture was a tremendous hit."
