= Fear (1946 film) =

1946 low-budget film noir directed by Alfred Zeisler

- Theatrical release poster
- Directed by: Alfred Zeisler
- Screenplay by: Dennis Cooper; Alfred Zeisler
- Based on: Crime and Punishment by: Fyodor Dostoyevsky
- Produced by: Lindsley Parsons
- Starring: Peter Cookson; Warren William
- Cinematography: Jackson Rose
- Edited by: Ace Herman
- Music by: Edward J. Kay
- Distributed by: Monogram Pictures Corporation
- Release date: March 2, 1946 (United States)
- Running time: 68 minutes
- Country: United States
- Language: English

Fear is a 1946 American low-budget film noir directed by Alfred Zeisler and produced by Monogram Pictures. The film loosely follows the main plot of Fyodor Dostoyevsky's 1866 novel Crime and Punishment, without attribution.

== Plot ==
Larry Crain (Peter Cookson), a medical student on a scholarship, learns that all student scholarships, including his, have been cancelled by his school. Desperately short of cash and overdue on paying his rent, Crain goes to the apartment of Professor Stanley (Francis Pierlot), a teacher who has a sideline as a pawnbroker, though Crain is already in debt to him too. Crain pawns his father's watch for a small amount of money, but notes details in the professor's apartment, including the strong box and wall safe where he keeps his money and a heavy fireplace poker.

A bit later at a diner, Crain meets a young woman (Anne Gwynne) who doesn't have cash to pay for her coffee. Crain covers her bill, and she promises to pay him back. However, when Crain receives a tuition bill from the school and an ultimatum from his landlady, he returns to the professor's apartment. Managing to be admitted by the professor without anyone else seeing him, including a painter at work in a room, Crain presents a tightly-wrapped object that he claims to be a cigarette case he'd like to pawn. While the professor struggles to unwrap the package and comes to realize that it is only a glass ashtray, Crain grabs a poker with his gloved hands and strikes the professor dead.

Crain nervously tries to open the strongbox, but before he can grab the money, he hears a couple of his school friends at the door, one of whom has an appointment with the professor. When their door knocks are not answered, the two worry that something is wrong and go off to find the janitor. Crain steps out without the money and closes the door, which locks behind him. Hearing his friends and the janitor approaching, he hides in the room that was being painted and finally escapes the building, but with a paint stain on his coat and no money.

A police detective (Nestor Paiva) brings Crain to the police station, where he is questioned by Captain Burke (Warren William) because his watch had been found at the professor's apartment among other pawned items. As Crain leaves the office, the house painter is brought in but states that he's never seen Crain before. Crain burns his stained jacket, but then his luck takes some sudden turns. He receives a check for a thousand dollars from a journal for an article that he wrote, and he meets the young woman again, now working at the diner where they met. Learning that her name is Eileen and with cash in his pocket, Crain begins to go out with her.

Crain, however, is still a police suspect, even though the painter has been taken into custody. The detective seems to be following him everywhere, and he meets with Captain Burke again. Burke is interested in Crain's journal article, where he argued that some lives are less valuable than others and that traditional morality should not apply in such cases. Eileen is also disturbed when discussing Crain's ideas with him. The pressure from the police and Crain's own conscience disorient and haunt him despite his stated philosophy, and he is nearly run down while wandering in a daze on a railroad track. He even confesses to Eileen, but she promises to go elsewhere with him if he does not turn himself in.

Crain goes to Burke's office, but Burke reveals that the painter has confessed to the killing. Even though he doubts the painter's claim, Burke has no other evidence to continue considering Crain a suspect. Relieved, Crain sees Eileen on a busy street corner and runs to meet her only to be struck by a car.

In a final twist, however, Crain is seen lying on his apartment bed, wearing the jacket we had seen him burn, now unstained. He sees his glass ashtray by the bed and hears a knock at the door. Professor Stanley, quite alive, enters, stating he took pity on Crain's situation and handing him one hundred fifty dollars as a loan. The "murder" and its aftermath had all been a dream. Crain's landlady then enters with a telegram that his scholarship has been renewed after all. In the hallway, Crain encounters a new tenant, Eileen, who returns the money he had paid for her coffee—the previous night. The young woman is puzzled that Crain calls her "Eileen" when her name is really Cathy, but takes it as a sign of romantic fate, agreeing to see him and even to let him call her "Eileen."

== Cast ==
- Peter Cookson as Larry Crain
- Warren William as Police Capt. Burke
- Anne Gwynne as Eileen Stevens
- Francis Pierlot as Prof. Stanley
- Nestor Paiva as Detective Shaefer
- James Cardwell as Ben
- Almira Sessions as Mrs. Williams - Landlady
- William Moss as Al
- Harry Clay as Student
- Ernie Adams as House Painter
- Charles Calvert as Doc
- Fairfax Burger as Magician

== Critical reception ==
Film historians Alain Silver and Elizabeth Ward give the film a positive review. "This low budget film is hardly pure Dostoevsky, but it has a visual style superior to and more cohesive than the typical Monogram product."
