= Romance of the Limberlost =

1938 film by William Nigh

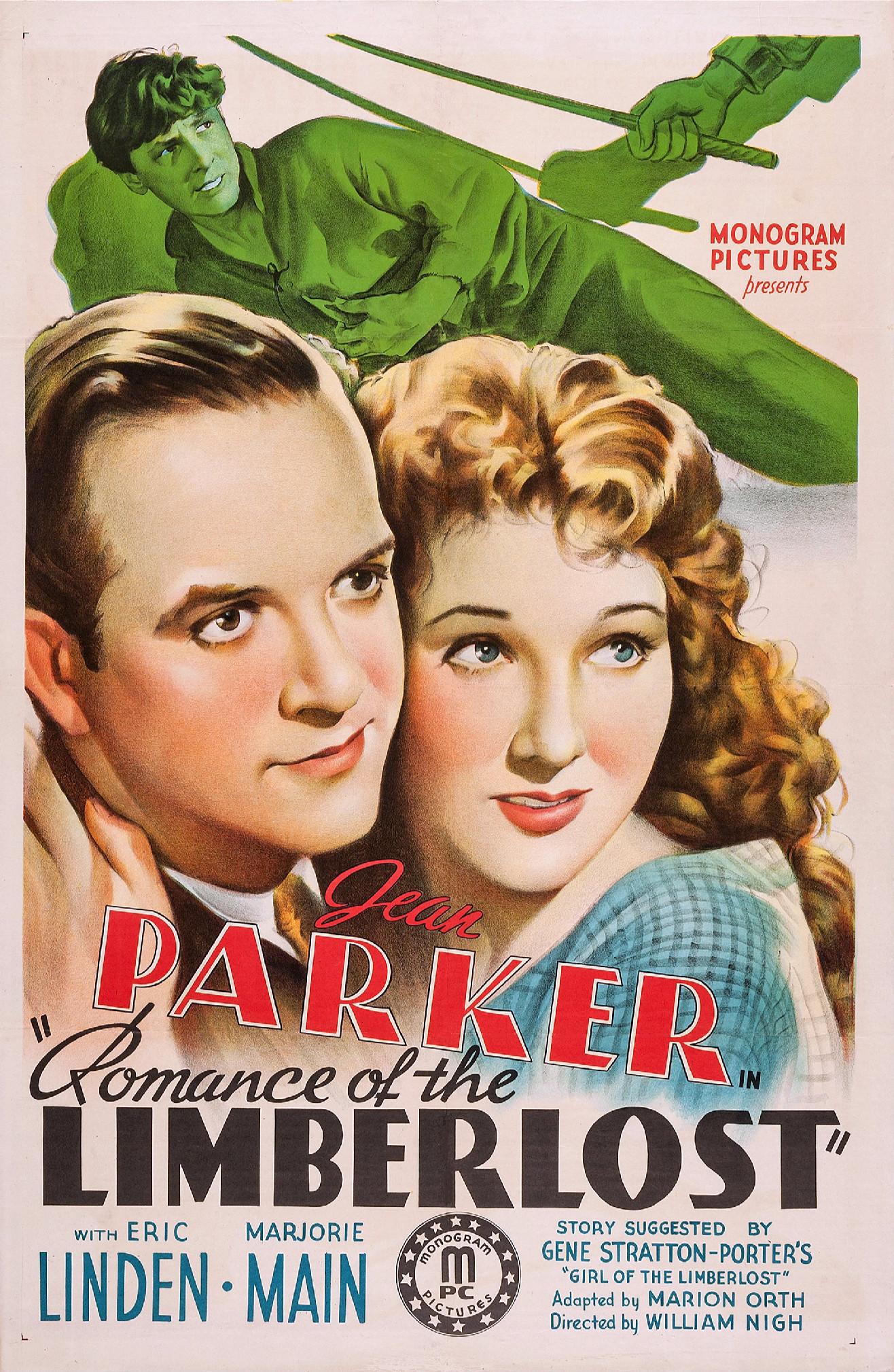
- Film poster
- Directed by: William Nigh
- Written by: Gene Stratton-Porter (novel Girl of the Limberlost); Marion Orth (screenplay)
- Produced by: Scott R. Dunlap (producer)
- Starring: Jean Parker; Eric Linden; Marjorie Main
- Cinematography: Gilbert Warrenton
- Edited by: Russell F. Schoengarth
- Production company: Monogram Pictures
- Release date: 16 June 1938 (USA)
- Country: United States
- Language: English

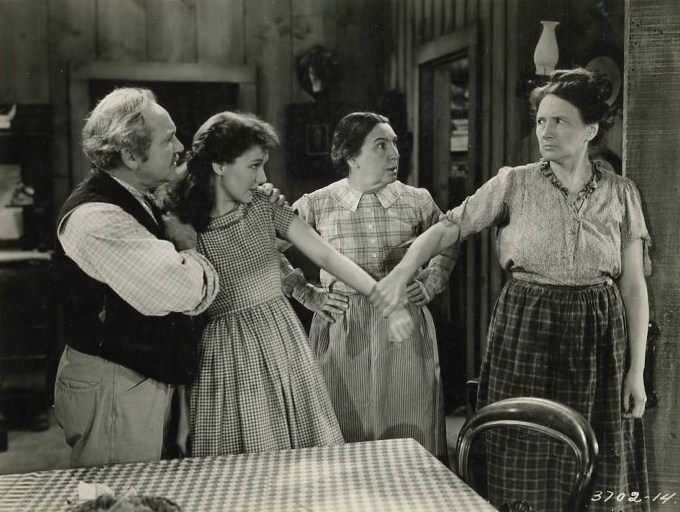
George Cleveland, Jean Parker, Sarah Padden, and Marjorie Main in Romance of the Limberlost (1938)

Romance of the Limberlost is a 1938 American drama film directed by William Nigh and starring Jean Parker, Eric Linden, and Marjorie Main.

== Plot ==
Laurie is reprimanded by her Aunt Nora and Chris being beaten by his adopted father Corson. When Laurie goes to help Chris bandage his hand, she explains to him that she plans to leave the Limberlost swamp. Nora blames Laurie for her mother's death and does not want Laurie to leave their swamp. Laurie flees her house and runs into the swamp, where she meets Wayne, a charming aspiring lawyer. She shows him her collection of butterflies and moths, along with her animal friends. After he leaves, Laurie helps Mrs. Parker, a wealthy author from town, who buys one of her butterflies and invites Laurie to tea with her in town.

After Mrs. Parker leaves, Nora sends Laurie to the general store to buy soap with the money she has earned from selling the butterflies. While there, Laurie comes across Corson who announces that he is looking for a new wife after his last one died. After Laurie leaves, the show owners discuss how Nora is so hard on Laurie because her mother married the man that Nora loved. They also decide to bring Laurie into town with them to a festival.

At the festival, Laurie runs into Mrs. Parker and Wayne again. The townspeople, including Wayne's father, start to make fun of Laurie, while she and Wayne start to dance. A man intentionally trips her and Wayne punches him when he starts to laugh at her. Mrs. Parker then takes Laurie back to her house to look at her butterfly collection.

Back at the swamp, Wayne and Laurie kiss, but when she returns to her house, Nora tells her she has to marry Corson because he told Nora that he will get rid of their mortgage if Laurie marries him. She runs out crying to the shopkeeper's house, where they try to plan how to get Laurie out of it. Nora tells her that her mother also wanted to leave the swamp, but her husband left her penniless, which caused her to commit suicide. She threatens to tell everybody in town about her mother if Laurie doesn't marry Corson, so she agrees.

At their wedding, Corson tries to raise the spirits of the guests, who are not enthusiastic about the wedding. Chris goes out to the barn with a gun, where he waits for Corson. Corson grabs the gun from him and it discharges, killing Corson. Chris is arrested for his murder and thrown in jail. Laurie visits Mrs. Parker in order to sell the rest of her butterfly collection to hire Wayne to represent Chris. Wayne's father tries to discourage him from taking the case, as he does not want his son to represent a "swamper".

At the trial, the prosecuting lawyer asks Laurie multiple questions, some of which the judge deems leading, but Wayne does not object. When he gets up to question Laurie, he gets Nora to admit to tricking Laurie into marrying Corson, as she lied about Laurie's parents. Wayne then calls Chris to the stand where he shows that Chris could not possibly have shoot Corson, as the trigger on the gun did not work. Chris is found not guilty and Nora and Laurie reconcile.

== Cast ==
- Jean Parker as Laurie
- Eric Linden as Wayne
- Marjorie Main as Nora
- Edward Pawley as Corson
- Betty Blythe as Mrs. Parker
- Sarah Padden as Sarah
- George Cleveland as Nathan
- Hollis Jewell as Chris
- Budd Buster as Fair Barker
- William Gould as Lawyer
- Harry Harvey as Jones

== Setting ==
The movie is set in the Limberlost, a northern Indiana swamp that was legendary for its beauty and biological diversity. The plot is based on a novel by Gene Stratton-Porter, who lived near the swamp for years and wrote both fiction and nonfiction about it. The story takes place in 1905, because by the time the movie was filmed in the 1930s, the swamp no longer existed. In the early 20th century, it had been systematically destroyed to clear the land for agriculture, even though Stratton-Porter and other naturalists fought to save it. Since the 1980s, the Limberlost has been partially restored as a protected natural area, though it is much smaller than in its heyday.

== Reception ==
Photoplay reviewed the film favorably, noting, "Sincerity and simplicity give charm to this Gene Stratton-Porter story... Eric Linden, Marjorie Main, and Betty Blythe, the silent queen, do nicely."
