= Jean Parker =

American actress (1915–2005)

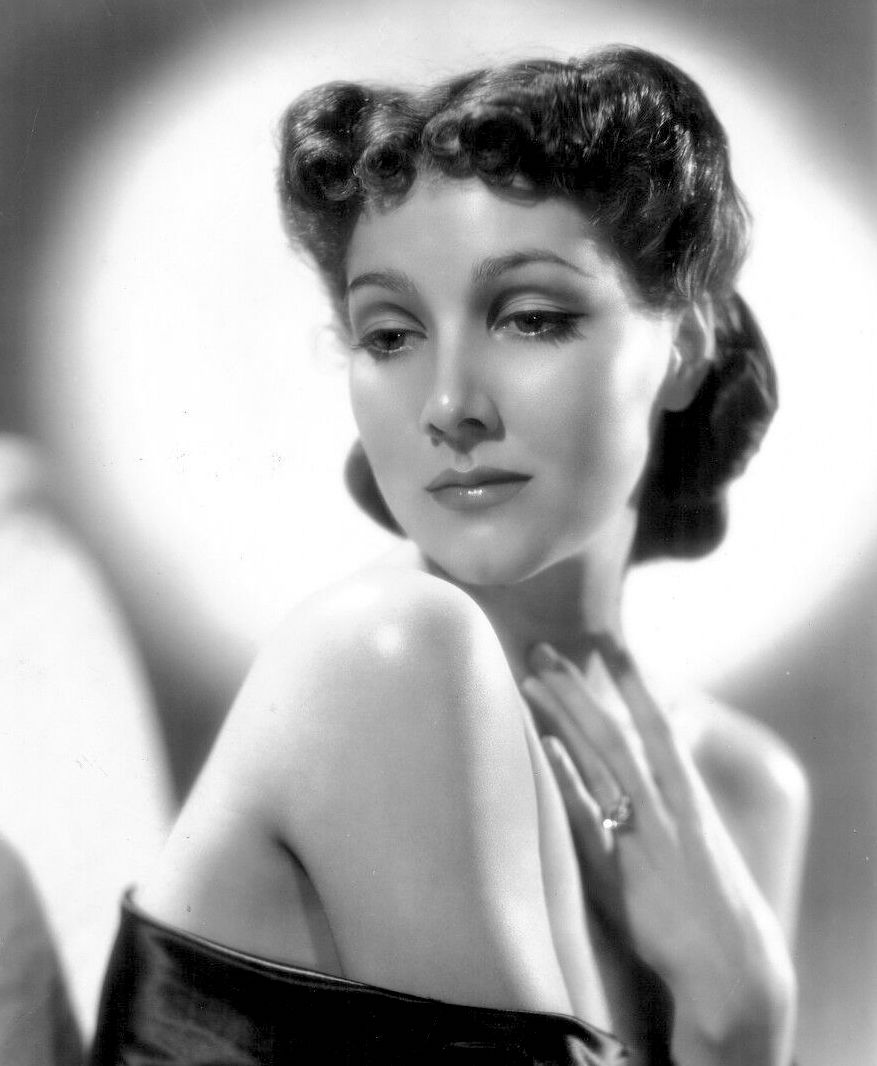
- Parker in 1933
- Born: Lois May Green; August 11, 1915 (Note: There is notable discord among sources regarding the details of Parker's birth, as various sources suggest different years, birthplaces, and birth names. The consensus agrees that her birthday was August 11, though her birth year has been variously reported as 1912, 1915, and 1916. In the book Montana Entertainers: Famous and Almost Forgotten (2019), writer Brian D'Ambrosio erroneously lists both 1915 and 1916 as her birth year in two different sections of her biography. Parker's obituaries in The New York Times and The Guardian both support a birth year of 1915, as they state she died at age 90. However, her obituary published in The Independent definitively states a birth year of 1916. Additionally, although she was born in the U.S. state of Montana, there is disagreement regarding the city in which she was born: Some sources state Deer Lodge, while others indicate Butte. Her birth name has also been a point of contention, with some sources stating she was born Lois Mae Green (a name she went by in early adulthood), and others suggesting she was born Luise Stephanie Zelinska, citing apparent Polish-French ancestry. The discrepancies regarding Parker's birth were addressed by her son, Robert Hanks, in her obituary published by the Los Angeles Times, in which it was noted: "Some biographical sources say she was born Luis (or Luise) Stephanie Zelinska in Butte, Mont., in 1912, but Hanks said she was born Lois May Green in Deer Lodge, Mont., in 1915." Robert's claim regarding her birth is supported by United States Census Bureau birth records for Powell County, Montana, which include a "Lois May Green" born August 11, 1915 in Deer Lodge, Montana.); Deer Lodge, Montana, U.S.
- Died: November 30, 2005 (aged 90); Los Angeles, California, U.S.
- Resting place: Forest Lawn Memorial Park (Hollywood Hills)
- Years active: 1932–1966
- Spouses: George MacDonald (m. 1936; div. 1940) Douglas Dawson (m. 1941; div. 1943) Curtis Grotter (m. 1944; div. 1948) Robert Lowery (m. 1951)
- Children: 1

Jean Parker (born Lois May Green; August 11, 1915 – November 30, 2005) was an American film and stage actress. A native of Montana, indigent during the Great Depression, she was adopted by a family in Pasadena, California, at age ten. She initially aspired to be an illustrator and artist, but was discovered at age 16 by Metro-Goldwyn-Mayer executive Louis B. Mayer after a photograph of her was published in a Los Angeles newspaper when she won a poster contest.

She made her feature film debut in the pre-code drama Divorce in the Family (1932), before being loaned to Columbia Pictures, who cast her in Frank Capra's Lady for a Day (1933). The same year, she starred as Elizabeth March in George Cukor's adaptation of Little Women opposite Katharine Hepburn, Joan Bennett, and Frances Dee. Subsequent roles included lead parts in the drama Sequoia (1934), and in the British comedy-fantasy The Ghost Goes West (1935).

Parker later starred in the Laurel and Hardy comedy The Flying Deuces (1939), followed by the sports film The Pittsburgh Kid (1941), and the film noir Dead Man's Eyes (1944), opposite Lon Chaney Jr. She made her Broadway debut in 1946, in the title role of Loco, followed by a leading role in the Broadway production of Burlesque (1946–1947) opposite Bert Lahr. In 1948, she replaced Judy Holliday for the national Broadway touring production of Garson Kanin's Born Yesterday, which earned her favorable reviews. The next year, she appeared opposite Gregory Peck in a stage production of the comedy Light Up the Sky.

By the 1950s, Parker's film career had slowed, though she continued to appear in a small number of films, including supporting parts in the Westerns The Gunfighter (1950) and Toughest Man in Arizona (1952), and the film noir Black Tuesday (1954). She gave birth to her only child, son Robert Lowery Hanks Jr., in 1952, from her fourth marriage to actor Robert Lowery. Parker made her final film appearance in 1965's Apache Uprising. She spent her later years in California, where she died of a stroke at the Motion Picture and Television Country House and Hospital in Los Angeles in 2005.

== Biography ==
=== 1915–1932: Early life ===
Parker was born on August 11, 1915, in Deer Lodge, Montana, to Lewis A. Green, a gunsmith, hunter, and chef from South Dakota, and Melvina Burch (later known professionally as Mildred Brenner, who worked in the MGM set department), a native of Deer Lodge. Many of the details surrounding Parker's birth have been reported with little consistency. Secondary sources regarding her birth year range from 1912 to 1916, and some claim she was born in Butte, not Deer Lodge. Furthermore, some sources state her birth name as Lois Mae (or May) Green, while others indicate she was born Luise Stephanie Zelinska. Despite these discrepancies, Parker's son, Robert, insisted she was born Lois May Green in Deer Lodge in 1915, which is consistent with contemporaneous Montana birth records from the United States Census Bureau.

Parker's parents were unemployed and experienced poverty. At some point in her early childhood, between ages 6 and 10, (Note: Biographer Brian D'Ambrosio states Parker relocated to California upon being adopted at age 10, while an article in the Billings Gazette simply states she "moved from Montana to Pasadena at age 6 with her family.") she was adopted by the Spickard family of Pasadena, California. She relocated there, and attended elementary school before graduating from Pasadena's John Muir High School. Her original aspirations were in the fine arts and illustration. In 1932, at age 17, Parker — then known as Lois May Green — entered a poster illustration competition, which resulted in her photograph appearing in a Los Angeles newspaper. Ida Koverman, an assistant to Metro-Goldwyn-Mayer (MGM) executive Louis B. Mayer, saw this photo and persuaded Mayer to give Parker a screen test. By Parker's account: "My ambition was to be an artist. I had no thought of acting."

=== 1932–1937: Career beginnings ===
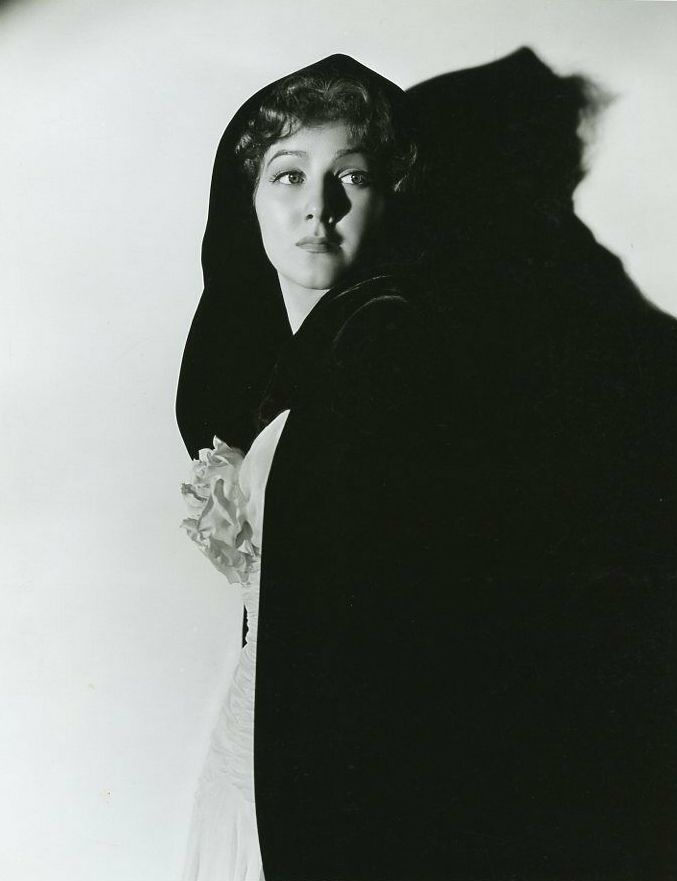
Parker photographed by George Hurrell, 1935

Following a successful screen test, Parker was signed to MGM and given her stage name of Jean Parker. She made her feature film debut in the drama Divorce in the Family (1932), followed by an uncredited role in Rasputin and the Empress (1932). She subsequently appeared in minor roles in the political fantasy film Gabriel Over the White House (1933), and the drama The Secret of Madame Blanche (also 1933).

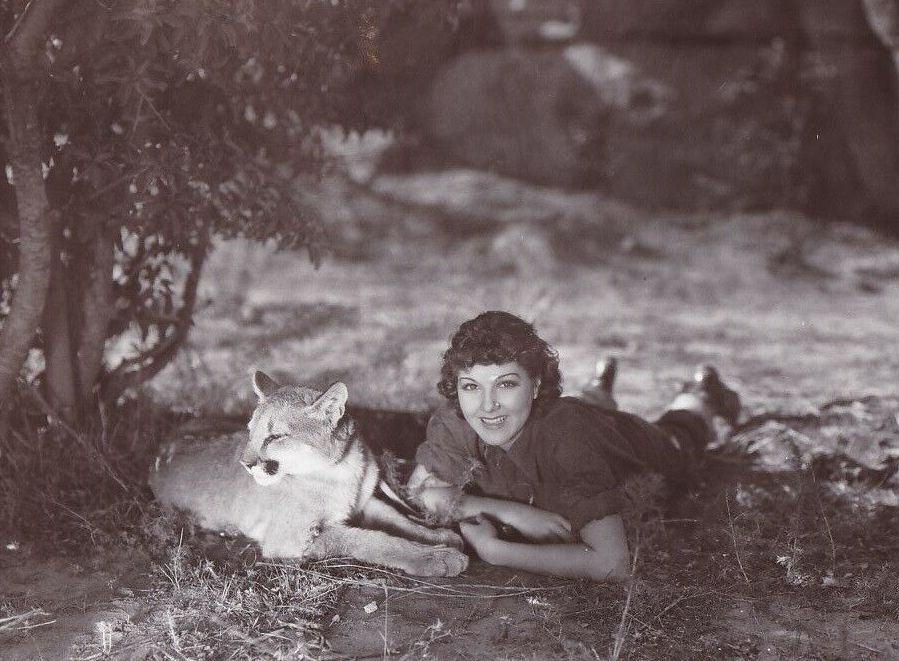
Parker with a mountain lion on the set of Sequoia (1934)

In 1933, MGM loaned Parker to Columbia Pictures, who provided her with larger parts in their films, beginning with a major supporting role in Frank Capra's comedy-drama Lady for a Day, playing the estranged daughter of an indigent saleswoman in New York City. The same year, Parker was loaned to RKO Pictures to appear in George Cukor's film adaptation of Little Women, portraying Elizabeth March opposite Katharine Hepburn, Joan Bennett, and Frances Dee. She later reflected: "Playing Beth was the hardest thing I ever did. I was scared stiff, for I had no real training in acting. To make it harder still, I was only 17 while the others were all over 24. I was terribly shy then... but all the girls did everything they could to help me, particularly Miss Hepburn."

The following year, RKO gave Parker her first starring role in Two Alone, which was followed by a series of leading roles for MGM, including in the drama Sequoia, in which she played a woman living among the sequoia forests of northern California raising a mountain lion and orphaned fawn; the romance Operator 13, in which she starred opposite Marion Davies and Gary Cooper, playing a Southern belle during the American Civil War; and in the drama A Wicked Woman, in which she starred as the daughter of a woman (played by Mady Christians) who murders her abusive husband. She also starred in the British film The Ghost Goes West for United Artists, playing the daughter of an American businessman opposite Robert Donat and Elsa Lanchester.

Though forging a successful acting career at the time, Parker continued to utilize her artistic talents, contracting in June 1935 to make eight original sketches a month for a Beverly Hills shop. In December 1935, Parker became engaged to New York socialite newspaperman George E. McDonald, and eloped with him to Las Vegas, Nevada, on March 22, 1936.

=== 1938–1949: Film and stage ===
In 1938, she had the lead role in the drama Romance of the Limberlost, followed by a supporting part in RKO's comedy The Flying Deuces (1939) opposite Stan Laurel and Oliver Hardy. On November 9, 1939, she opened the Downtown Theatre in Oakland, California, and in December 1941, at the Orinda Theater in Contra Costa County. In January 1940, after four years of marriage to McDonald, Parker was granted an interlocutory decree of divorce, which was finalized on January 23, 1941. On February 14, 1941, Parker married Los Angeles radio commentator Henry Dawson Sanders, known professionally as Douglas Dawson. Beginning in September 1941, the couple operated a flying service (the Dawson-Parker Parker Flying Service) from Palm Springs Airport in California, which was eventually shuttered at the outbreak of World War II. In July 1942, Sanders joined the United States Coast Guard, and in September 1942 the couple were separated preceding their July 1943 divorce. A month after she was granted her final divorce decree on July 29, 1944, Parker married Dr. Kurt "Curtis" Arthur Grotter, a Hollywood insurance broker and former correspondent for a group of Czechoslovak newspapers and active with the Braille Institute in Los Angeles, as he had a substantial loss of vision.

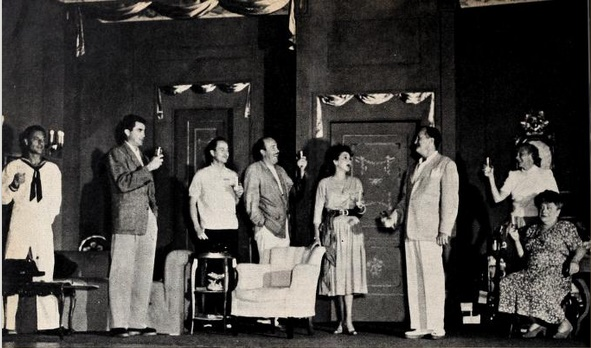
Parker (center) in a stage production of Light Up the Sky with Gregory Peck (second from left), 1949

Parker remained active in film throughout the war, playing opposite Lon Chaney Jr. in the film noir thriller Dead Man's Eyes (1944). For Monogram Pictures, she inaugurated the Kitty O'Day mystery film series, playing the title character in two films: Detective Kitty O'Day (1944), and Adventures of Kitty O'Day (1945). In the latter part of the 1940s, Parker appeared in several stage productions: She made her Broadway debut in the title role of the comedy Loco in 1946. Journalist Lee Evans of The Cincinnati Enquirer gave the play a middling review, noting that while the play was "fairly well acted," Parker "does not create any great stir with her performance." Parker returned to Broadway with a starring role opposite Bert Lahr in Burlesque (1946–1947).

In late 1948, she replaced Judy Holliday in the national touring Broadway production of Born Yesterday, co-starring with Lon Chaney Jr. Her performance in the production was well received by audiences. A review of the October 1948 Philadelphia premiere by The Philadelphia Inquirer gave the production a rave review, noting: "To say that piquant and personable Miss Parker, and Chaney as her uncouth, comedy Caliban, play their parts as though they had been written for them, is the highest possible praise, but is amply merited for the zestful spontaneity of their performances." In the summer of 1949, Parker appeared in a production of the comedy play Light Up the Sky, opposite Gregory Peck, which opened at the La Jolla Playhouse before having touring performances throughout the fall of that year. On December 29, 1949, Parker and her third husband, Grotter, were granted a divorced following their July 1949 separation. In April 1947, Jean Parker Christened Seaboard Air Line passenger train, "The Silver Comet" at New York's Penn station, before the train's first run to Birmingham, Alabama.

=== 1950–2005: Later career and retirement ===
Parker and Chaney continued to appear in touring productions of Born Yesterday through 1950. Also in 1950, Parker returned to film with a supporting role in The Gunfighter opposite Gregory Peck, playing a saloon singer. The following year, in 1951, while appearing at a nightclub in Sydney, Australia, Parker made international headlines when she was escorted off Bondi Beach by swimsuit inspector Abe Laidlaw, who measured her bikini and determined it was too skimpy.

On May 19, 1951, Parker secretly married actor Robert Lowery Hanks at the home of a friend in Hialeah, Florida. The two had previously co-starred in the 1944 film The Navy Way. In late 1951, Parker and Lowery co-starred in a touring stage production of Sidney Kingsley's Detective Story. Critic Harold Whitehead, reviewing a Montreal performance of the play, observed that Parker seemed "shaky and ill-at-ease" throughout. The following year, on September 24, 1952, Parker gave birth to her only child, a son, Robert Lowery Hanks II, in Los Angeles.

Parker continued to appear occasionally in films throughout the remainder of the 1950s, including a starring role opposite Edward G. Robinson in the film noir Black Tuesday (1954), followed by a role in A Lawless Street (1955). In 1954, Parker played the role of "Cattle Kate Watson of Wyoming" in an episode of the syndicated television series Stories of the Century, the first western program to win an Emmy Award. Later in her career and life, Parker continued a successful stint on the West Coast theatre circuit and worked as an acting coach. Parker filed for divorce from her fourth husband, Lowery, in September 1957, but it was never finalized. She made her last film appearance was in Apache Uprising (1965).

Parker worked as an acting coach in the 1970s for a time, but spent the following several decades largely out of the public eye, earning a reputation as a "Hollywood recluse."

In 1998, she moved into the Motion Picture and Television Country House and Hospital in the Woodland Hills section of Los Angeles.

== Death ==
Parker died of a stroke at the Motion Picture and Television Country House and Hospital on November 30, 2005. She is interred at the Forest Lawn Memorial Park in Hollywood Hills.

== Legacy ==
In the 1950s, columnist Erskine Johnson deemed Parker "the Liz Taylor of the 1930s." Upon her death, journalist Ronald Bergan noted Parker as an under-valued actress whose career was stifled by the studio system who gave her "too little chance to shine."

== Sources ==
- Aaker, Everett (2013). George Raft: The Films. Jefferson, North Carolina: McFarland. ISBN 978-0-786-49313-5.
- D'Ambrosio, Brian (2019). Montana Entertainers: Famous and Almost Forgotten. Chicago, Illinois: Arcadia Publishing. ISBN 978-1-439-66733-0.
- Eames, John Douglas (1988). The MGM Story: The Complete History of Fifty Roaring Years. New York City, New York: Crown. ISBN 978-0-517-52613-2.
- Fishgall, Gary (2002). Gregory Peck: A Biography. New York City, New York: Simon and Schuster. ISBN 978-0-684-85290-4.
- Kear, Lynn; Rossman, John (2008). The Complete Kay Francis Career Record: All Film, Stage, Radio and Television Appearances. Jefferson, North Carolina: McFarland. ISBN 978-0-786-43198-4.
- McNeil, Alex (1996). Total Television. New York City, New York: Penguin. ISBN 978-0-14-024916-3.
- Schneck, Ralph H.; Schneck, Donald R. (2013). Cheerio and Best Wishes: Letters from a World War II Hoosier Pilot. West Lafayette, Indiana: Purdue University Press. ISBN 978-1-557-53640-2.
