= Apache Uprising =

1965 film by R. G. Springsteen

- Theatrical release poster
- Directed by: R. G. Springsteen
- Screenplay by: Max Lamb; Harry Sanford
- Based on: Way Station; 1961 novel by Harry Sanford; Max Steeber
- Produced by: A. C. Lyles
- Starring: Rory Calhoun; Corinne Calvet; John Russell; Lon Chaney Jr. Gene Evans; Richard Arlen; Robert H. Harris
- Cinematography: W. Wallace Kelley
- Edited by: John F. Schreyer
- Music by: Jimmie Haskell
- Production company: A.C. Lyles Productions
- Distributed by: Paramount Pictures
- Release date: December 29, 1965
- Running time: 90 minutes
- Country: United States
- Language: English

Apache Uprising is a 1965 American Technicolor Western Techniscope film directed by R. G. Springsteen and written by Max Lamb and Harry Sanford. The film stars Rory Calhoun, Corinne Calvet, John Russell, Lon Chaney Jr., Gene Evans, Richard Arlen and Robert H. Harris. It also includes the last screen appearance of one-time cowboy star Johnny Mack Brown. The film was released on December 29, 1965, by Paramount Pictures.

== Plot ==
The film takes place in Arizona circa 1880s and deals with the stage coach lines trying to run from Texas through Arizona over to Phoenix and points west. The stage coach and passengers are attacked by renegade Apaches. These stage coach hands, passengers, and various AZ outlaws, all of whom are travelling through Indian country, are forced to join forces against the Apaches in order to save their lives and scalps.

== Cast ==
- Rory Calhoun as Jim Walker
- Corinne Calvet as Janice MacKenzie
- John Russell as Vance Buckner
- Lon Chaney Jr. as Charlie Russell
- Gene Evans as Jess Cooney
- Richard Arlen as Captain Gannon
- Robert H. Harris as Hoyt Taylor
- Arthur Hunnicutt as Bill Gibson
- DeForest Kelley as Toby Jack Saunders
- George Chandler as Jace Asher
- Jean Parker as Mrs. Hawks
- Johnny Mack Brown as Sheriff Ben Hall
- Don "Red" Barry as Henry Belden
- Abel Fernandez as Young Apache Chief
- Robert Carricart as Chico Lopez
- Paul Daniel as Tonto Chief Antone
- Regis Parton as Hank
- Roy Jenson as Sgt. Hogan
- Rodd Redwing as Archie Whitewater
- Dan White as Townsman Laughing at Sheriff
- Ben Stanton as Townsman Joe
- Rudy Sooter as Townsman

== See also ==
- List of American films of 1965
