= Toughest Man in Arizona =

1952 film by R. G. Springsteen

- Theatrical release poster
- Directed by: R. G. Springsteen
- Screenplay by: John K. Butler
- Produced by: Sidney Picker
- Starring: Vaughn Monroe; Joan Leslie; Edgar Buchanan; Victor Jory; Jean Parker; Harry Morgan
- Cinematography: Reggie Lanning
- Edited by: Richard L. Van Enger
- Music by: R. Dale Butts
- Production company: Republic Pictures
- Distributed by: Republic Pictures
- Release date: October 10, 1952
- Running time: 85 minutes
- Country: United States
- Language: English

Toughest Man in Arizona is a 1952 American Western film directed by R. G. Springsteen, written by John K. Butler, and starring Vaughn Monroe, Joan Leslie, Edgar Buchanan, Victor Jory, Jean Parker and Harry Morgan. It was released on October 10, 1952, by Republic Pictures.

== Plot ==
Marshal Matt Landry is after Frank Girard for selling guns to the Indians. He apprehends him. A small wagon trail heading for Tombstone is approached by the US army. The army warns them that Indians may attack them and leaves them two men and a Gatling gun as they leave to search for the war party. Mary and Verne Kimber argue about his future in Tombstone. The army officer notices the crickets stopped chirping, a sign that the Indian attack is imminent. They quickly douse the fire. The Indians attack and the army officer tells Mrs. Kimber to take the two children and head down into the gulley. The Indians overwhelm the wagon train killing everyone.

Landry and his prisoner Girard arrive at the wagon train the next day and to bury the dead. Landry locates Mrs. Kimber and the children. The Indians attack as they are leaving. Landry frees Girard and gives him a gun to fight. As the Indians leave, Girard turns his gun on Landry. He tries to take the buckboard and Landry jumps him, beating him.

They arrive in Tombstone and Girard is put in jail. Girard gets a few minutes with his girlfriend Della, telling her to contact his brothers.

Landry arrives home and greets his children and sings two of the children to sleep. Later, Verne Kimber arrives in Tombstone. He asks about a stage for San Francisco, which he must earn by cleaning.

Della also arrives to meet with Girard’s brothers. Kimber recognizes the picture of his wife in the newspaper as a survivor of the Apache attack. Girard’s brother tells Kimber to “stay dead” until he gets to San Francisco.

Landry is having dinner with Mrs. Kimber and the children. Jim Hadlock visits and suggests they send Girard out of town sooner than later. Landry writes a telegram for Jim to send, requesting the transfer to Prescott.

Matt and Mary discuss her moving to the local boarding house and taking a job at the newspaper. The children beg him to sing to them before bed, and he does.

The Girard brothers have Verne build a telegraph machine so they can intercept all messages relating to the transfer of their brother.

Matt gets a reply to his telegram and Girard is being sent to Prescott, today (Sunday). They place Frank in a hearse and Matt joins him. Frank’s brothers, Steve and Jerry, stop the hearse and Frank escapes with them, after killing the undertaker and wounding Matt.

Matt returns with the hearse and is treated for his wounds. Mary stays to help him recover.

Frank meets Verne, who asks for his money. Another telegraph comes through advising of a silver transfer of 72,000 ounces. Frank decides to steal the gold and agrees to give Verne 1/4 of the haul.

Frank, Steve, and Jerry attack the stagecoach and take the silver. Meanwhile, Matt recovers at home. Matt tells Mary that he loves her and wants to marry her. Mary tells him she needs to get past the idea that Verne died to save her life, although she may not have loved him.

Matt goes to the sheriff’s office and Jim tells him that the Girards stole the silver shipment. Matt decides to investigate the telegrams sent by the mining company. He finds Della’s telegrams to Frank. They question her. She admits Frank had the wires tapped and identifies Verne Kimber as the one intercepting the telegrams.

Verne tells Frank he wants his 1/4 of the silver. Frank tells him he no longer needs him and gets no share. Verne goes to the stable to steal the silver. Matt and Jim arrive and Verne tells them where the Girards are staying.

A stranger tells Frank about the posse, which is about an hour behind him. They take him hostage and go for the silver. Matt and Jim are waiting for them. A gunfight follows. All three brothers are killed.

Kimber sees a chance to take the silver and shoots Jim. Matt overpowers him. Verne will stand trial for murder. Verne asks for Mary so she goes due to a sense of responsibility. Joan tells her father Mary will be back. He asks her how she knows. She responds shaking her head “You men!”.

== Cast ==
- Vaughn Monroe as Marshal Matt Landry
- Joan Leslie as Mary Kimber
- Edgar Buchanan as Jim Hadlock
- Victor Jory as Frank Girard
- Jean Parker as Della
- Harry Morgan as Verne Kimber
- Ian MacDonald as Steve Girard
- Lee MacGregor as Jerry Girard
- Diana Christian as Joan Landry
- Robert Hyatt as Davey Billings
- Charlita as Señorita
- Nadine Ashdown as Jesse Billings
- Francis Ford as Hanchette
- Paul Hurst as Dalton

== Production ==
Parts of the film were shot in Snow Canyon State Park in Utah.
