= Black Tuesday (film) =

1954 film by Hugo Fregonese

- Theatrical release poster
- Directed by: Hugo Fregonese
- Screenplay by: Sydney Boehm
- Produced by: Robert Goldstein
- Starring: Edward G. Robinson; Peter Graves; Jean Parker
- Cinematography: Stanley Cortez
- Edited by: Robert Golden
- Music by: Paul Dunlap
- Production company: Leonard Goldstein Productions
- Distributed by: United Artists
- Release date: December 31, 1954 (New York City)
- Running time: 80 minutes
- Country: United States
- Language: English

Black Tuesday is a 1954 American crime drama film noir directed by Hugo Fregonese and starring Edward G. Robinson, Peter Graves and Jean Parker. The supporting cast features Milburn Stone, Warren Stevens, Jack Kelly and Russell Johnson.

== Plot ==
A violent con, Vincent Canelli, escapes prison on the night of his execution. With the help of a phony newspaper reporter and Canelli's girlfriend, Hatti, who has planned the escape, the con takes along five hostages: the prison priest, the prison doctor, one of the guards, the young reporter whose place has been taken by one of the gang, and the daughter of another guard. This young woman is kidnapped to force her father - who, unlike the guard who is taken hostage, always treats the death row inmates well - to facilitate the escape.

Another inmate, Peter Manning, is taken along because Canelli wants the large amount of stolen money Manning hid before going to jail. He killed someone during the robbery, and refuses to reveal to the authorities where the money is unless his death sentence is changed to a life sentence. All of the other death row inmates are taken along too, but Manning is injured badly in the escape. He is treated by the hostage prison doctor, and when he regains consciousness, is disturbed to learn that Canelli abandoned the other three inmates; they did not know the escape was going to happen, and have nowhere to go, and no one and nothing to help them in their escape, unlike Canelli. The search for these prisoners will dilute the pursuit of Canelli and make his escape easier. Manning and Hatti go to collect the money, but his wound re-opens and a bank security officer spots the blood, recognizes Manning's photo in the newspaper, rushes outside and catches a glimpse of the getaway vehicle and its license plate.

The gang ends up at a hideout, but as they are preparing to flee the country with the loot, they're surrounded by police. Canelli threatens to kill hostages if he's not given safe passage; he shoots and seriously injures one of the hostages, and murders the kidnapped prison guard to make his point. He then plans to throw the injured hostage down from the upper floor to his death. This is finally too much for Manning and he ends up killing Canelli, then deliberately goes out to the police with his gun in his hand, rather than go back to death row.

== Cast ==
- Edward G. Robinson as Canelli
- Jean Parker as Hatti
- Peter Graves as Manning
- Milburn Stone as Father Slocum
- Warren Stevens as Joey Stewart
- Sylvia Findley as Ellen Norris
- Jack Kelly as Carson
- James Bell as John Norris
- Vic Perrin as Dr. Hart
- Russell Johnson as Howard Sloane
- Frank Ferguson as Police Inspector Hailey

== Reception ==
The New York Times gave the film a positive review, writing, "...it's good to have a reminder that Hollywood still holds top priority in the gangster melodrama field. Take Black Tuesday, which accompanied the Palace's new stage bill yesterday, with Edward G. Robinson playing his old, snarling, savage self. We hastily add that this medium-budget United Artists offering, produced by Robert Goldstein, by no means reprises the sterling tradition of those cops-and-killers yarns about our urban jungles of the roaring Twenties, when the Robinsons, Cagneys and Munis cut their fangs. However, purely on a surface level, the new entry can snuggle up to them quite respectably ... In contrast to Mr. Robinson's wholesale sputtering, the supporting cast of comparatively unfamiliar faces are brought, one by one, into impersonal but perceptive focus. And most of them shine convincingly."

Film historian and critic Alain Silver said of the film, "When society at large is threatened, the psychopaths presented tend to be of the most violent ilk, as if to justify social repression by exaggerating the threat. Edward G. Robinson as gangster Vincent Canelli in Black Tuesday... exhibits a sadistic bent rivaled only by James Cagney in White Heat."
