= Frank J. Scannell =

American film and television actor

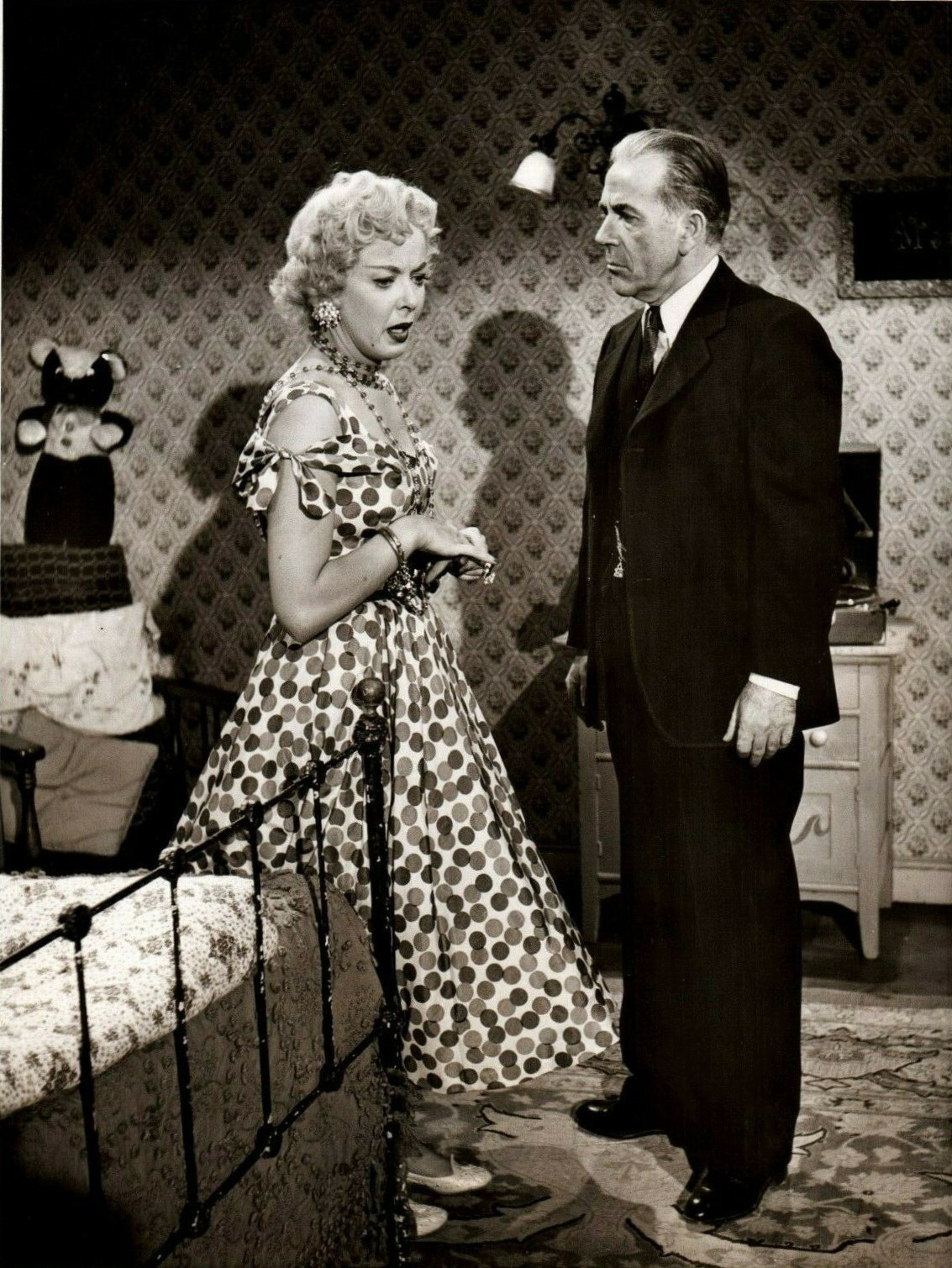
- Scannell (right) with Ida Lupino in Four Star Playhouse, 1956
- Born: Francis J. Scannell; May 7, 1903; Boston, Massachusetts, U.S.
- Died: November 29, 1989 (aged 86)
- Occupations: Film and television actor
- Years active: 1943–1976

Francis J. Scannell (May 7, 1903 – November 29, 1989) was an American film and television actor. He appeared in over 100 films and television programs, including six appearances in the American western television series The Life and Legend of Wyatt Earp.

Scannell was born in Boston, Massachusetts. He began his career in 1943 in the film Whistling in Brooklyn, which starred Red Skelton. In 1944 Scannell appeared in several roles in the sketch show Yours for Fun at The Fonda Theatre in Los Angeles. His appearances in television shows included Tombstone Territory, 77 Sunset Strip, Lawman, I Love Lucy, The Beverly Hillbillies, Tales of Wells Fargo, The Virginian, The Big Valley, Death Valley Days, Sky King, The Jack Benny Program and Bat Masterson.

His film appearances included Johnny Doesn't Live Here Anymore (1944); Within These Walls (1945); Lover Come Back (1946); I Wonder Who's Kissing Her Now (1947); Texas, Brooklyn & Heaven (1948); She's Working Her Way Through College (1952); A Lawless Street (1955); Decision at Sundown (1957) and The Gunfight at Dodge City (1959). His final credit was in the police procedural television series McMillan & Wife. He made an appearance in the 1952 film Meet Danny Wilson.

Scannel died in November 1989, at the age of 86.
