= Divorce in the Family =

1932 film

- Directed by: Charles Reisner
- Screenplay by: Delmer Daves
- Story by: Maurice Rapf; Delmer Daves
- Produced by: Harry Rapf
- Starring: Jackie Cooper; Conrad Nagel; Lewis Stone; Lois Wilson; Jean Parker; Maurice Murphy
- Cinematography: Oliver T. Marsh
- Edited by: William S. Gray
- Production company: Metro-Goldwyn-Mayer
- Distributed by: Metro-Goldwyn-Mayer
- Release date: August 27, 1932
- Running time: 81 minutes
- Country: United States
- Language: English

Divorce in the Family is a 1932 American pre-Code drama film directed by Charles Reisner and written by Delmer Daves. The film stars Jackie Cooper, Conrad Nagel, Lewis Stone, Lois Wilson and Jean Parker. It was released on August 27, 1932, by Metro-Goldwyn-Mayer.

== Cast ==
- Jackie Cooper as Terry Parker
- Conrad Nagel as Dr. Shumaker
- Lewis Stone as John Parker
- Lois Wilson as Mrs. Shumaker
- Jean Parker as Lucile
- Maurice Murphy as Al Parker
- Lawrence Grant as Kenny
- Richard Wallace as Snoop
- David Newell as Interne
- Oscar Rudolph as Spike
- Louise Beavers as Rosetta
- Edith Fellows as a little girl with a kite (uncredited)
