= Adventures of Kitty O'Day =

1945 film by William Beaudine

- Directed by: William Beaudine
- Written by: Tim Ryan; Victor Hammond; George Callahan
- Produced by: Lindsley Parsons; Trem Carr
- Starring: Jean Parker; Peter Cookson; Tim Ryan; Lorna Gray
- Cinematography: Mack Stengler
- Edited by: Richard Pike
- Music by: Edward J. Kay
- Production company: Monogram Pictures
- Distributed by: Monogram Pictures
- Release date: January 19, 1945
- Running time: 63 minutes
- Country: United States
- Language: English

Adventures of Kitty O'Day is a 1945 American comedy mystery film directed by William Beaudine and starring Jean Parker, Peter Cookson and Tim Ryan. It was a sequel to the 1944 film Detective Kitty O'Day. The two films were an attempt to create a new detective series but no further films were made. A third film, Fashion Model, also directed by Beaudine, was made using a similar formula but with another actress playing a heroine with a different name.

== Plot ==
Amateur detective Kitty O'Day and her boyfriend are employed in a hotel. After the owner is shot, O'Day takes over the investigation despite the protests of the police.

== Cast ==
- Jean Parker as Kitty O'Day
- Peter Cookson as Johnny Jones
- Tim Ryan as Inspector Clancy
- Lorna Gray as Gloria Williams
- Jan Wiley as Carla Brant
- Ralph Sanford as Mike, Police Detective Sergeant
- William Forrest as Sauter
- Byron Foulger as Roberts
- Hugh Prosser as Nick Joel
- Dick Elliott as Bascom, Hotel Guest
- William Ruhl as Michael Tracey
- Carl Mathews as Policeman
- Constance Purdy as Woman in Ladies Spa

== Bibliography ==
- Gates, Phillipa. Detecting Women: Gender and the Hollywood Detective Film. SUNY Press, 2011.
- Marshall, Wendy L. William Beaudine: From Silents to Television. Scarecrow Press, 2005.
