= Operator 13 =

1934 film by Richard Boleslawski

- Theatrical release poster
- Directed by: Richard Boleslawski
- Screenplay by: Harvey F. Thew; Zelda Sears; Eve Greene
- Based on: Secret Service Operator; 1934 novel by Robert W. Chambers
- Produced by: Lucien Hubbard
- Starring: Marion Davies; Gary Cooper; Jean Parker
- Cinematography: George J. Folsey
- Edited by: Frank Sullivan
- Music by: William Axt
- Production companies: Cosmopolitan Productions; Metro-Goldwyn-Mayer
- Distributed by: Loew's, Inc.
- Release date: June 8, 1934 (USA)
- Running time: 85 minutes
- Country: United States
- Language: English
- Budget: $880,000
- Box office: $1,010,000

Operator 13 is a 1934 American pre-Code romance film directed by Richard Boleslawski and starring Marion Davies, Gary Cooper, and Jean Parker.

Based on stories written by Robert W. Chambers, the film is about a Union spy who impersonates a black maid in the early days of the Civil War, but complications arise when she falls in love with a Confederate officer. George J. Folsey received an Academy Award nomination for Best Cinematography.

The film features the Four Mills Brothers and Davies performing musical numbers and the supporting cast includes Ted Healy, Douglas Dumbrille as Jeb Stuart, Sidney Toler as Allan Pinkerton, Fuzzy Knight, and an uncredited Sterling Holloway as a wounded Union soldier.

== Plot ==
In the American Civil War, Union forces are reeling after their defeat in the Second Battle of Bull Run. The Pauline Cushman Players are performing for wounded soldiers at a Union military hospital. Pauline, a spy who works for Allan Pinkerton, recommends her close friend and fellow showgirl Gail to become a spy for the Union cause as Operator 13 (the previous Operator 13 having been caught and shot).

Gail, disguised in blackface, accompanies Pauline south as her octaroon black maid. The Confederates become aware there is a spy in their midst, and Captain Gailliard is asked to help find out who it is. While washing General Stuart’s clothes, Gail hears he will attend a ball that night. At the ball, Captain Gailliard suspects that Pauline is a spy and finds evidence in her room. Pauline, trying to flee, is arrested and Gail is forced to testify against her; refusing to divulge her contact, Pauline is sentenced to death. Both women manage to escape and return to the Union lines.

Pinkerton decides to use Gail to trap Gailliard, and as part of the plan, she jeers at a parade of Union soldiers and is thought to be a heroine in the Southern newspapers. Gail, as Anne Claibourne, is pardoned by Lincoln and heads south, where Captain Gailliard is attracted to her. However, Gail is later told by Stuart's groom, a fellow spy, that she is known to be a spy and she flees in a Confederate uniform. Gailliard grabs her horse, but she strikes him with a gun and rides off with the groom. Gailliard and others pursue them.

The fugitives hide in an abandoned farmhouse. Gailliard finds her. Fortunately for her, a group of Union soldiers are nearby. When they spot the groom, still wearing a Confederate uniform, they shoot him. Gail and Gailliard watch undetected as a Confederate is executed by a Union firing squad. Gail tells Gailliard she loves him and refuses to betray him to the soldiers. Then the Confederates attack. In the fighting, Gail persuades Gailliard to slip away in the confusion and rejoin his side.

The war effectively comes to an end when Robert E. Lee surrenders to Ulysses S. Grant at Appomattox Court House. Afterward, Gail and Gailliard reconcile.

== Cast ==
- Marion Davies as Gail Loveless (Operator 13)
- Gary Cooper as Captain Jack Gailliard
- Jean Parker as Eleanor Shackleford
- Katharine Alexander as Pauline Cushman (Operator 27)
- Ted Healy as Doctor Hitchcock
- Russell Hardie as Lieutenant Gus Littledale
- Henry Wadsworth as Captain John Pelham
- Douglass Dumbrille as General Stuart
- Willard Robertson as Captain Cornelius Channing
- Fuzzy Knight as Private Sweeney (Stuart's groom)
- Sidney Toler as Major Allan Pinkerton
- Robert McWade as Colonel Sharpe
- Marjorie Gateson as Mrs Shackleford
- Wade Boteler as Officer Gaston
- Walter Long as Operator 55
- E. Alyn Warren as General Ulysses S. Grant (uncredited)
- John Elliott as General Robert E. Lee (uncredited)
- Samuel S. Hinds as Officer Price (uncredited)

Curly Howard of The Three Stooges fame was cast in a small speaking part, which was mostly cut prior to release. He is briefly seen in the film.

== Reception ==
The New York Times reviewer found it "scarcely credible in most of its action", but "In its own peculiar fashion it is entertaining and besides the capable work of Miss Davies there are splendid performances by Jean Parker and Gary Cooper."

The film grossed a total of $1,010,000: $619,000 from the U.S. and Canada and $391,000 in other markets, resulting in a loss of $226,000.

== In popular culture ==
Operator 13 is referenced in the 1935 Three Stooges short film Uncivil Warriors, which parallels the plot and includes the names of the characters (Operators 12 through 15, with Operator 13 having died beforehand). The title is referenced in the 1941 film noir I Wake Up Screaming when Victor Mature's character accuses another of being a “regular Operator 13”.

== See also ==
- List of films and television shows about the American Civil War
