= Sequoia (1934 film) =

1934 film by Edwin L. Marin, Chester M. Franklin

- Directed by: Chester M. Franklin
- Screenplay by: Ann Cunningham; Sam Armstrong; Carey Wilson
- Based on: Malibu; 1931 novel by Vance Hoyt
- Produced by: John W. Considine Jr.
- Starring: Jean Parker; Russell Hardie; Samuel S. Hinds; Paul Hurst; Willie Fung
- Cinematography: Chester A. Lyons
- Edited by: Charles Hochberg
- Music by: Herbert Stothart
- Production company: Metro-Goldwyn-Mayer
- Distributed by: Metro-Goldwyn-Mayer
- Release date: December 22, 1934
- Running time: 71 minutes
- Country: United States
- Language: English

Sequoia is a 1934 American drama film directed by Chester M. Franklin and written by Ann Cunningham, Sam Armstrong and Carey Wilson. The film stars Jean Parker, Russell Hardie, Samuel S. Hinds, Paul Hurst and Willie Fung. The film was released on December 22, 1934, by Metro-Goldwyn-Mayer.

== Plot ==
Toni and her father Matthew Martin live in the sequoia forests of California. While Toni is out walking, she finds a puma, which she names 'Gato' and a young fawn that she calls 'Malibu.' Toni and her adopted animals become friends quickly. After several years, Toni and her father leave the woods and Gato and Malibu are returned to the wild. Later, when Toni and her father return, they find that the animals in the area have been decimated by logging and hunting. With aggressive hunting parties roaming the area, it is up to Gato and Malibu to survive.

== Cast ==
- Jean Parker as Toni Martin
- Russell Hardie as Bob Alden
- Samuel S. Hinds as Dr. Matthew Martin
- Paul Hurst as Bergman
- Willie Fung as Sang Soo
- Harry Lowe Jr. as Feng Soo
- Ben Hall as Joe
