= Detective Kitty O'Day =

1944 film by William Beaudine

- Directed by: William Beaudine
- Written by: Tim Ryan; Victor Hammond
- Produced by: Lindsley Parsons
- Starring: Jean Parker; Peter Cookson; Tim Ryan; Veda Ann Borg
- Cinematography: Ira H. Morgan
- Edited by: Richard C. Currier
- Music by: Edward J. Kay
- Production company: Monogram Pictures
- Distributed by: Monogram Pictures
- Release date: May 13, 1944
- Running time: 61 minutes
- Country: United States
- Language: English

Detective Kitty O'Day is a 1944 American comedy mystery film directed by William Beaudine and starring Jean Parker, Peter Cookson and Tim Ryan. The film was intended as an attempt to create a new low-budget detective series, but only one sequel, Adventures of Kitty O'Day (1945), was made.

== Plot ==
After her boss is murdered, secretary and aspiring detective Kitty O'Day sees a chance to put her skills to the test to the annoyance of the investigating police officer Inspector Clancy. When Clancy won't properly investigate the dead man's widow, O'Day takes it upon herself to unmask the killer - with the reluctant assistance of her boyfriend Johnny Jones.

== Cast ==
- Jean Parker as Kitty O'Day
- Peter Cookson as Johnny Jones
- Tim Ryan as Inspector Clancy
- Veda Ann Borg as Mrs. Wentworth
- Edward Gargan as Mike
- Douglas Fowley as Harry Downs
- Olaf Hytten as Charles, Wentworth's Butler
- Edward Earle as Oliver M. Wentworth
- Herbert Heyes as Attorney Robert Jeffers

== See also ==
- List of American films of 1944

== Bibliography ==
- Gates, Phillipa. Detecting Women: Gender and the Hollywood Detective Film. SUNY Press, 2011.
- Marshall, Wendy L. William Beaudine: From Silents to Television. Scarecrow Press, 2005.
