= The Pittsburgh Kid =

1941 film by Jack Townley

- Directed by: Jack Townley
- Written by: Houston Branch; Octavus Roy Cohen; Earl Felton
- Produced by: Armand Schaefer
- Starring: Billy Conn; Jean Parker; Dick Purcell
- Cinematography: Reggie Lanning
- Edited by: Ernest J. Nims
- Music by: Ross DiMaggio; Mort Glickman; Paul Sawtell
- Production company: Republic Pictures
- Distributed by: Republic Pictures
- Release date: August 29, 1941
- Running time: 76 minutes
- Country: United States
- Language: English

The Pittsburgh Kid is a 1941 American sports film directed by Jack Townley and starring Billy Conn, Jean Parker and Dick Purcell.

The film's sets were designed by the art director John Victor Mackay.

== Plot ==
About to fight his biggest bout, Billy Conn is upset by the death of Pop Mallory, his manager. A boxing promoter, Max Allison, who wants Billy to fight for him, uses daughter Barbara to try to sway him away from Pop's daughter Pat Mallory, who keeps Billy under contract.

An impatient Billy dislikes the way Pat handles his career. Meanwhile, nightclub owner Joe Barton resents the interest his girl Barbara Ellison has been showing Billy, neither knowing nor carry that it's all a ruse on her part on her father's behalf.

Billy finally gets a title shot, thanks to Pat's management and reporter Cliff Halliday's enthusiastic buildup. But when an angry Barton comes to threaten Billy, a gun goes off, Barton is killed and Billy is arrested for his murder. By the time he can get released, Pat isn't there on fight night and Billy's first round goes badly. Barbara rushes to find Pat, convincing her that she belongs in Billy's corner for good.

== Cast ==
- Billy Conn as Billy Conn
- Jean Parker as Patricia Mallory
- Dick Purcell as Cliff Halliday
- Alan Baxter as Joe Barton
- Veda Ann Borg as Barbara Ellison
- Jonathan Hale as Max Ellison
- Ernest Whitman as Feets Johnson
- John Kelly as Knockout Riley
- Etta McDaniel as Magenta
- Dick Elliott as Garvey
- John Harmon as Morrie
- Robert Barron as Devlin
- Henry Armstrong as Sparring Partner
- Sam Balter as Radio announcer (voice)
- Arthur Donovan as Referee
- Jack Roper as The Champ
- Freddie Steele as Freddie Steel
- Dan Tobey as Fight announcer

== See also ==
- List of boxing films

== Bibliography ==
- Ritchie, Andrew. Ethnicity, Sport, Identity: Struggles for Status. Routledge, 2004.
