= A Lawless Street =

1955 film by Joseph H. Lewis

- Theatrical release poster
- Directed by: Joseph H. Lewis
- Screenplay by: Kenneth Gamet
- Story by: Brad Ward
- Based on: The Marshal of Medicine Bend; 1953 novel by Brad Ward
- Produced by: Harry Joe Brown
- Starring: Randolph Scott; Angela Lansbury
- Cinematography: Ray Rennahan
- Edited by: Gene Havlick
- Music by: Paul Sawtell
- Production company: Columbia Pictures
- Distributed by: Columbia Pictures
- Release date: December 15, 1955 (USA)
- Running time: 78 minutes
- Country: United States
- Language: English

A Lawless Street is a 1955 American Western film directed by Joseph H. Lewis and starring Randolph Scott and Angela Lansbury. The film is also known as The Marshal of Medicine Bend in the United States, the name of Brad Ward's 1953 novel that the film was based on.

== Plot ==
The marshal of Medicine Bend, Calem Ware (Randolph Scott), tries to keep peace in a lawless town while trying to prevent himself from being killed. The arrival of a show troupe re-unites the marshal with someone from his past, leading to a showdown with his would-be killers and his old flame, Tally Dickenson (Angela Lansbury).

A secret conspiracy to oust the marshal exists between saloon owner Cody Clark (John Emery) and Hamer Thorne (Warner Anderson), owner of the music hall where Tally is appearing. Thorne fancies himself a ladies' man and is playing several women at once—Tally and Cora Dean (Jean Parker), the lonely, middle-aged wife of a wealthy rancher Asaph Dean (James Bell) who is a Ware ally.

Marshal Ware gets into a brutal fistfight with Dooley (Don Megowan), the brother of a man the marshal killed in self-defense. Dooley is impressed enough by the beating he took that he also becomes the marshal's ally.

Clark and Thorne resort to bringing in a hired gun, Harley Baskam (Michael Pate) to kill Ware. Ware loses a gunfight to Baskam, but he is only unconscious from a bullet that creased his head. Ware's friends keep him concealed in the town jail until he is recovered enough to fight back.

The town goes through a brief period of lawlessness, but Cora discovers Thorne's true nature and offers to turn state's evidence. When Ware is recovered, he makes quick work of Baskam in a second showdown.

Thorne accidentally kills Clark when he hears a doorknob rattle and assumes Ware is on the other side of the door. A posse catches up with Thorne.

With the town cleaned up for good, Ware resigns as marshal and leaves town to renew his relationship with his long-secret wife, Tally, who now understands better about Ware's devotion to duty.

== Cast ==
- Randolph Scott as Marshal Calem Ware
- Angela Lansbury as Tally Dickenson
- Warner Anderson as Hamer Thorne
- Jean Parker as Cora Dean
- Wallace Ford as Dr. Amos Wynn
- John Emery as Cody Clark
- James Bell as Asaph Dean
- Ruth Donnelly as Molly Higgins
- Harry Antrim as Mayor Kent
- Michael Pate as Harley Baskam
- Don Megowan as Dooley

== See also ==
- List of American films of 1955
