= Peter W. Cookson Jr. =

Peter W. Cookson Jr. (born November 17, 1942) is an American sociologist, academic, and author. He is the author of twenty books on education reform, inequality, and new models of learning. His books have been widely reviewed in such publications as The New York Times Book Review, Publishers Weekly, and Kirkus Reviews.

== Early life and education ==
Peter Cookson graduated from New York University where he received a B.A. in American History, M.A. in European Intellectual History, and Ph.D. in the Sociology of Education. He also received a post-graduate certificate in Administration, Planning and Social Policy from the Harvard Graduate School of Education and an M.A. in religion from Yale Divinity School.

== Career ==
A strong proponent of education reform, his articles have appeared frequently in Education Week and The Huffington Post, among others. He received a special citation in the category of best blog for Education Sector's "The Quick and the Ed" from the National Education Writers Association for education reporting in 2012.

Since the 1980s, Cookson has been a college and university professor and administrator, most notably at Teachers College, Columbia University, where he founded the Center for Educational Outreach and Innovation and TC Innovations. He was managing director of Education Sector, an independent education policy think tank, and is currently Principal Researcher and Director of The Equity Project at American Institutes for Research (AIR), and teaches sociology at Georgetown University.

As a specialist in American education and equity in education, Cookson has been interviewed often, most recently on Bloomberg Radio's education network.
