= Black Midnight (film) =

1949 film

- Directed by: Budd Boettlicher
- Screenplay by: Erna Lazarus; W. Scott Darling
- Story by: Clint Johnston
- Produced by: Lindsley Parsons
- Starring: Roddy McDowall; Damian O'Flynn; Lyn Thomas; Kirby Grant; Gordon Jones
- Cinematography: William Sickner
- Edited by: Ace Herman
- Music by: Edward J. Kay
- Production companies: Lindsley Parsons Productions, Inc.
- Distributed by: Monogram Distributing Corp.
- Release date: October 2, 1949
- Running time: 66 minutes
- Country: United States
- Language: English

Black Midnight is a 1949 American Western film directed by Budd Boetticher and starring Roddy McDowall, Damian O'Flynn, and Lyn Thomas.

The film was part of a three picture deal he had with Eagle Lion films. It was also known as Thunder the Great.

== Plot ==
Bill Jordan, a rancher, treats his nephew Scott like a son, since his own son Daniel ran away from home years ago. One day, Scott and Bill are invited to a neighbor’s house to celebrate the return of Martha Baxter and her daughter Cindy. Daniel and his friend Roy arrive, accompanied by several mares and a black stallion that he claims to have bought. Unable to break in the stallion, Daniel is about to kill him when Scott offers to buy him for $30. Scott shows great patience and eventually manages to tame the horse, which he names Midnight. One day, while sorting through papers, the sheriff finds a notice about a horse theft and begins to wonder about the brand on Daniel’s horses. To avoid suspicion, Daniel orders Roy to get rid of Midnight. After being beaten by Roy, the horse tramples his attacker to death. Fearing that Bill might kill the stallion, Scott hides Midnight in the hills where, with Cindy’s help, he tends to the horse’s wounds. Later, the sheriff convinces Bill that Roy provoked the attack that killed him, and Bill regains Scott’s trust by killing a mountain lion that was threatening the boy and his horse. Daniel eventually turns himself in; the charges against him are dropped, and he gets his horses back—except for Midnight, who stays with Scott.

== Cast ==
- Roddy McDowall
- Damian O'Flynn
- Lyn Thomas
