= The Wolf Hunters (1949 film) =

1949 film by Budd Boetticher

- Directed by: Budd Boetticher
- Written by: James Oliver Curwood; Scott Darling
- Produced by: Lindsley Parsons; William F. Broidy (associate producer)
- Starring: Kirby Grant; Jan Clayton; Edward Norris; Helen Parrish
- Cinematography: William A. Sickner
- Edited by: Ace Herman
- Music by: Edward J. Kay
- Production company: Monogram Pictures
- Distributed by: Monogram Pictures
- Release date: October 30, 1949
- Running time: 70 minutes
- Country: United States
- Language: English

The Wolf Hunters is a 1949 American Northern film directed by Budd Boetticher and starring Kirby Grant, Jan Clayton and Edward Norris. It was based on the novel by James Oliver Curwood, which had previously been adapted in 1926 as The Wolf Hunters and in 1934 as The Trail Beyond starring John Wayne, Noah Beery, Sr. and Noah Beery, Jr. The film was the second in a series of ten films featuring Kirby Grant as a Canadian Mountie.

== Plot ==
Fur trappers have been killed, and their furs stolen, so Corporal Rod Webb is sent to investigate. Corporal Webb finds another trapper who’d been shot, but is still alive. With the help of his dog Chinook Webb tracks down the man who attempted to kill the trapper.

== Cast ==
- Kirby Grant as RCMP Corporal Rod Webb
- Jan Clayton as Renée
- Edward Norris as Paul Lautrec
- Helen Parrish as Marcia Cameron
- Charles Lang as J. L. McTavish
- Ted Hecht as Muskoka
- Luther Crockett as Supt. Edward Cameron
- Elizabeth Root as Minnetaki
- Chinook as Chinook, Webb's dog

== Production ==
Budd Boetticher later recalled, "Monogram! That was really second rate! Wolf Hunters was an outdoor picture, kind of an "in the snow" thing, and I put all my friends in it who were out of work. Jan Clayton, Kirby Grant, everyone I knew who was out of a job. It was twelve days; just terrible".

== See also ==
- Trail of the Yukon (1949)
- Snow Dog (1950)
- Call of the Klondike (1950)
- Northwest Territory (1951)
- Yukon Manhunt (1951)
- Yukon Gold (1952)
- Fangs of the Arctic (1953)
- Northern Patrol (1953)
- Yukon Vengeance (1954)

== Bibliography ==
- Drew, Bernard. Motion Picture Series and Sequels: A Reference Guide. Routledge, 2013.
- McGhee, Richard D. John Wayne: Actor, Artist, Hero. McFarland, 1999.
