= Northern (genre) =

Multimedia genre set primarily in Northern Canada and Alaska

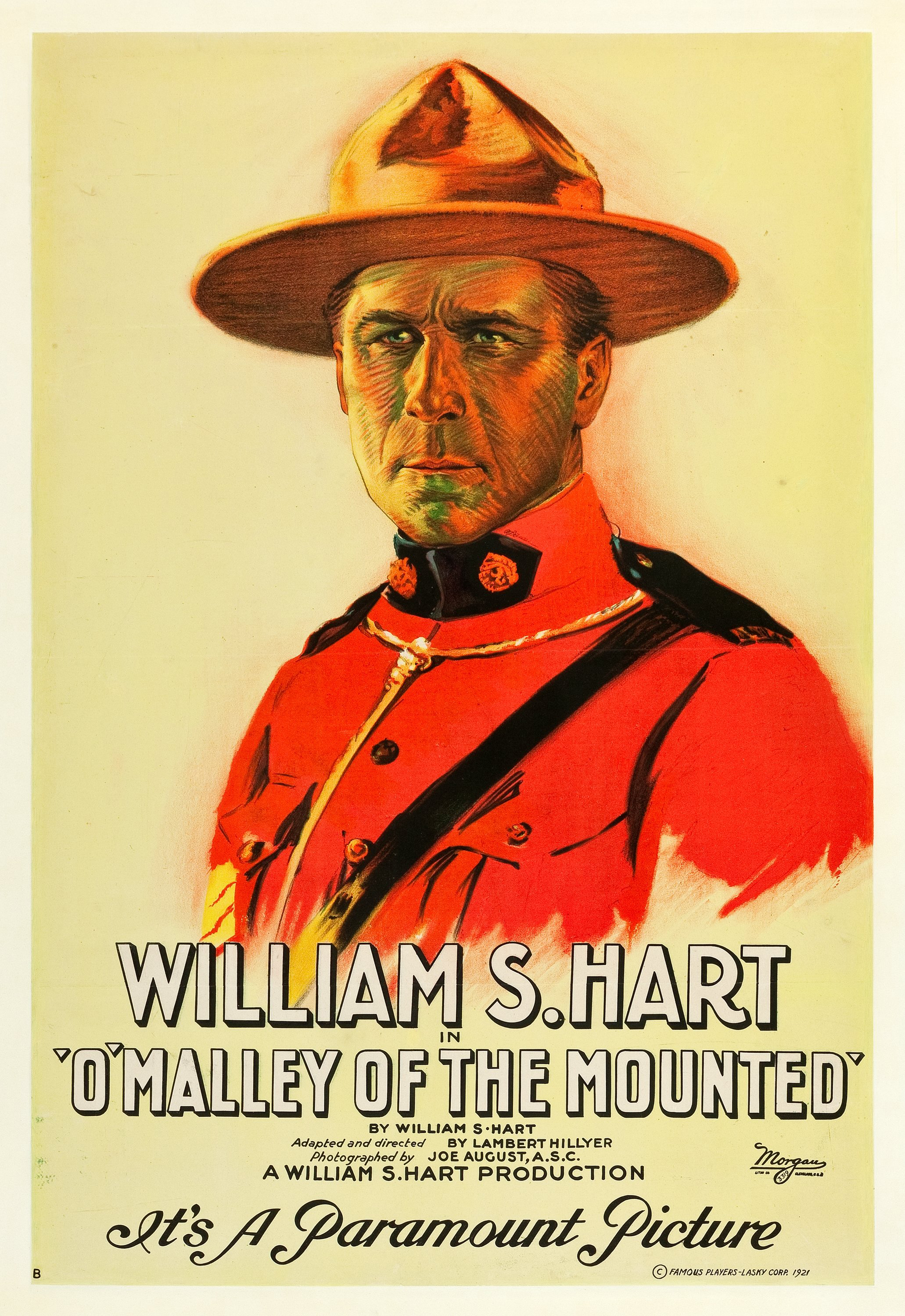
Poster for the film O'Malley of the Mounted (1921)

The Northern or Northwestern is a genre in various arts that tell stories set primarily in the late 19th or early 20th century in the north of North America, primarily in western Canada but also in Alaska. It is similar to the Western genre, but certain elements are different, as appropriate to its setting. It is common for the central character to be a Mountie instead of a cowboy or sheriff. Other common characters include fur trappers and traders, lumberjacks, frontiersmen, prospectors, First Nations people, outlaws, settlers, and townsfolk.

International interest in the region and the genre was fuelled by the Klondike Gold Rush (1896–99) and subsequent works surrounding it, fiction and non-fiction. The genre was extremely popular in the interwar period of the 20th century. Northerns are still produced, but their popularity waned in the late 1950s.

Notable early cinematic examples of the Northern include Nanook of the North (1922) and The Gold Rush (1925), while modern examples include the Jack London adaptations White Fang (1991) and The Call of the Wild (2020), similar dog-themed films Balto (1995) and Togo (2019), and survival-themed films The Snow Walker (2003) and The Revenant (2015).

== Characteristics ==
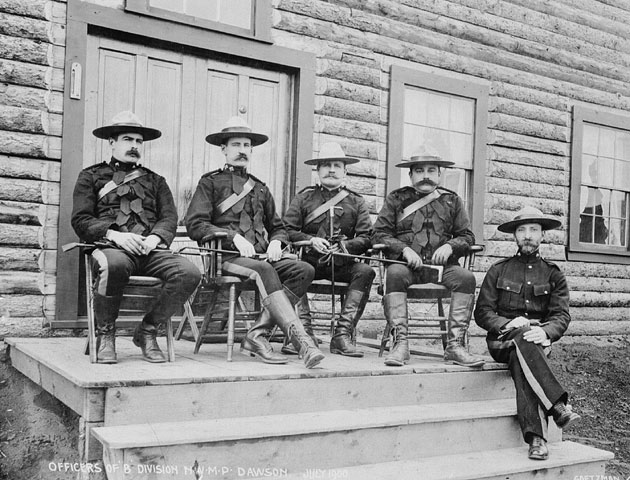
The North-West Mounted Police, and later the Royal Canadian Mounted Police, were often the heroes of Northern fiction.

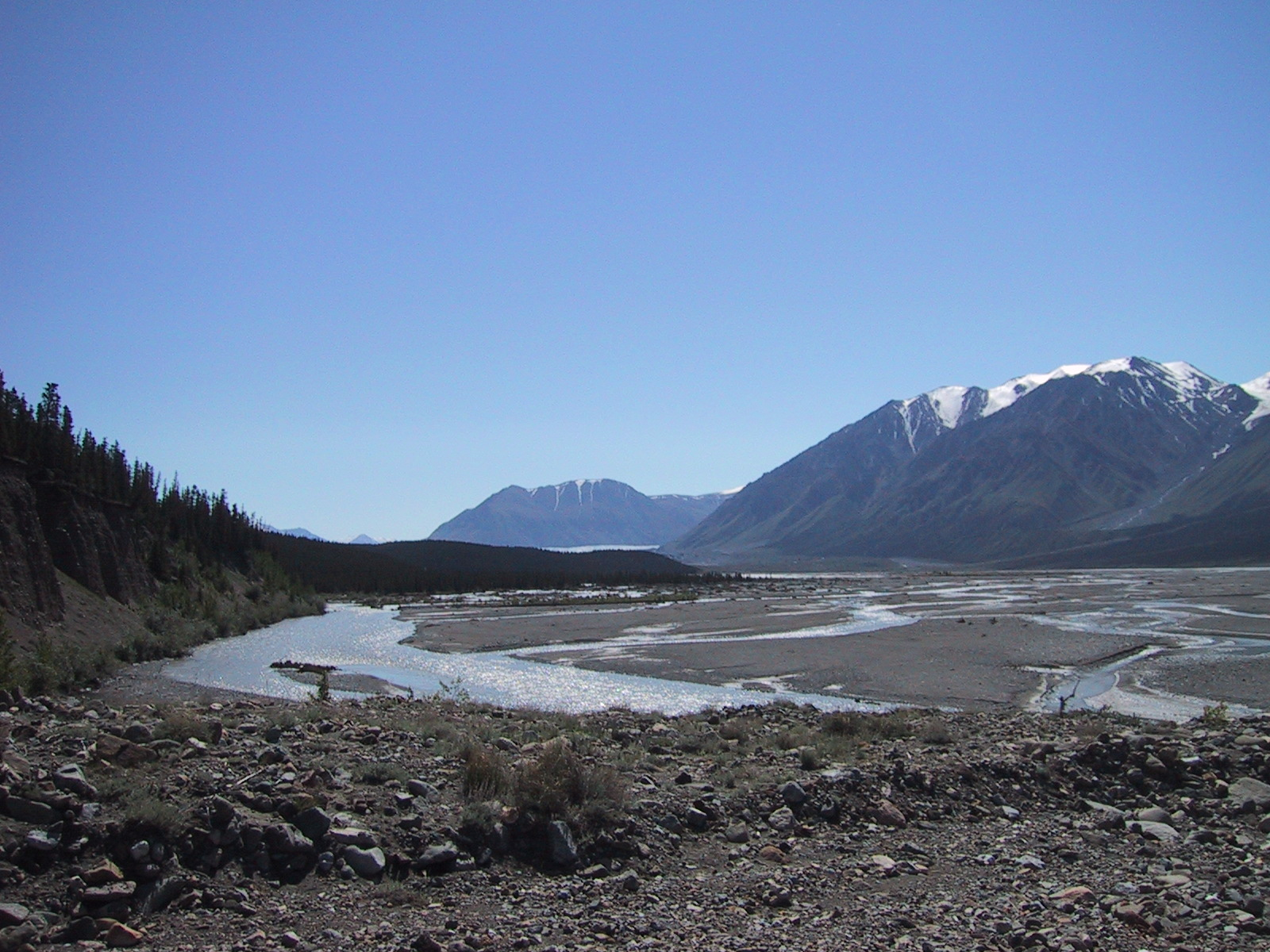
The Yukon (occasionally near the Alaskan border) was a common setting for Northern fiction.

Northerns are similar to Westerns but are set in the frozen north of North America; that is, Canada or Alaska. Of the two, Canada was the more common setting, although many tropes could apply to both. Popular locations within Canada are the Yukon, the Barren Grounds, and area around Hudson Bay. Generic names used for this general setting included the "Far North", the "Northlands", the "North Woods", and the "Great Woods".

Common settings include boreal forests, isolated cabins, and mining towns. Snow featured to such an extent that Northern films were sometimes termed "snow pictures". Animals were a common feature too. Dogs and dog sleds were popularized by The Call of the Wild and White Fang. Scenes involving attacks by bears date back to The Klondyke Nugget.

The primary antagonist in a Northern can be the wilderness, the weather and other natural elements, which the protagonists must endure, overcome and survive.

Northerns often explore the 'Matter of Canada' (the national mythos of Canada, after the Matter of Rome). Common elements of which are the Black Donnelly murders (February 1880), the North-West Rebellion (1885), the Klondike Gold Rush (1896–99), the pursuit of Albert Johnson (January 1932), the October Crisis (October 1970), and persistent national anxiety about potential annexation by the United States.

The Western idea of lawlessness set in American towns was not a part of the Canadian Northern, though individual lawbreakers or uprisings by Canadians feature in works such as Quebec (1951), Riel (1979), and Northwest Mounted Police (1940). In Northerns and wider crime fiction, the general Canadian preference is for law enforcement to be performed by the state rather than vigilantes or private investigators. Likewise, Northerns rarely feature the heroic outlaws often found in Westerns. On the subject, David Skene-Melvin writes "Canada never had a Wild West because the Mounties got there first," while Margaret Atwood writes "No outlaws or lawless men for Canada; if one appears, the Mounties always get their man."

Law and order in Northerns set in Canada is most often represented by the Mounties, either the North-West Mounted Police or Royal Canadian Mounted Police depending on era. Like snow, Mounties are a common enough feature to become a synonym for the genre, with Northern films sometimes called "Mountie films". Their popularity was not confined to film; by 1930, 75 volumes of written Mountie fiction had been published, not including juvenile fiction and material published in magazines. Where a protagonist in a Western is often part of both civilization and the wild (whether native or criminal), Mounties in Northerns are entirely a part of civilization. The nature of fictional Mounties can vary depending on the nationality of the author. Mounties as written by British authors are often younger members of upper class British families serving the British Empire in the colonies. American-authored Mounties are often little different from US Marshalls and project the values of Westerns in that they place their individual sense of justice and conscience above their duty to the law. Canadian-authored Mounties represent, and are self-abnegating champions of, the Canadian establishment and its laws. Further, their authority does not come from either their social class or physical abilities; such a Mountie "upholds the law by moral rather than physical force". A common story outline for Northerns involving Mounties is a pursuit, confrontation and capture: the Mountie's pursuit of a fugitive takes place across the Canadian wilderness and may be resolved non-violently.

According to Pierre Berton "the French-Canadian was to the northerns what the Mexican was to the Westerns — an exotic primitive, adaptable as a chameleon to play a hero or a heavy." French-Canadians were a ubiquitous element of the genre. As characters, French-Canadians are typically depicted as rustic and uneducated. These characters were usually divided into two broad types: the heroic, happy-go-lucky bon-vivant and the villainous, lecherous killer. Some later examples merged the two stereotypes into a charming, roguish anti-villain. Common visual elements were a tuque, a sash and a pipe. All were present in the first appearance in film, in A Woman's Way (1908). Female French-Canadian characters also followed the "tempestuous" stereotype of female Mexican characters. Mexican actress Lupe Vélez, in line with her identity as "The Mexican Spitfire", played the title character in Tiger Rose (1929) in this mode; as did Renée Adorée in The Eternal Struggle (1923) and Nikki Duval in Quebec (1951).

A common anachronism in Northerns was the tyranny and absolute power of the Hudson's Bay Company and its officers, even into the modern period. This was repeated not just in fiction but by reviewers and critics too. The concept of La Longue Traverse, or the Journey of Death, comes from The Call of the North (1914) and was popular in later films. In this, the Hudson's Bay Company executes convicts by forcing them into the wilderness without equipment or supplies. In 1921, the Hudson's Bay Company successfully sued the Famous Players–Lasky Corporation for the villainous portrayal of their Company in the latter's remake The Call of the North.

Alaska Natives or Métis are featured in some depictions.

Besides being set in Canadian Prairies, the stories often contrast the American frontier with the Canadian frontier in several ways. In films such as Pony Soldier and Saskatchewan the North-West Mounted Police display reason, compassion and a sense of fair play in their dealings with Aboriginal people (First Nations) as opposed to hotheaded American visitors (often criminals), lawmen or the American Army who seem to prefer extermination with violence.

== History ==
David Skene-Melvin classes the "second period" of Canadian crime literature (1880–1920), as "the heyday of the 'Northern' and the literary exploration of Canada's remote and romantic frontiers." He refers to Joseph Edmund Collins as an important figure in this period because, despite his work being of low quality, he was the first Canadian author to address some aspects of the 'Matter of Canada' in his novels, such as The Story of Louis Riel: The Rebel Chief (1885) and Annette, the Métis Spy (1886). Northerns continued to be written after 1920 but Canadian authors largely moved to other genres after World War I as they moved away from a frontier and colonial ethos.

The Klondike Gold Rush during the 1890s in Canada and Alaska brought a lot of wider, international attention to the far north of North America. Adventure novels from veterans of the gold rush—such as Jack London's The Call of the Wild (1903), Rex Beach's The Spoilers (1906) and Robert W. Service's The Trail of Ninety-Eight (1909)—became best sellers. These inspired more adventure fiction which grew in popularity throughout the first half of the twentieth century. The genre was extremely popular in the inter-war years, with a "Mountie craze" hitting its peak during the mid-1920s.

A large amount of Northern fiction is the work of non-Canadians. Nevertheless, Skene-Melvin writes "Just as the Western is widely regarded as emblematic of American culture, it can be argued that the Northern is the only truly indigenous Canadian art form, even if most of its exponents have been foreigners."

One of the earliest international examples of the genre is the British play The Klondyke Nugget, which was first performed in 1898. Its author, Samuel Franklin Cody initially wrote it as a Western but changed the location to capitalize on the contemporary gold rush.

Charlie Chaplin's 1925 film The Gold Rush is a comedy that parodies some of the cliches of the Northern genre. The Looney Tunes character Blacque Jacque Shellacque, who first appeared in the 1959 short Bonanza Bunny, is another parody.

While the Hollywood Western began to change in the post-World War II era and the Western myth eventually lost popularity, Hollywood Northerns remained mostly unchanged until their production waned in the late 1950s, the underlying mythology never being challenged.

== Examples of Northerns ==
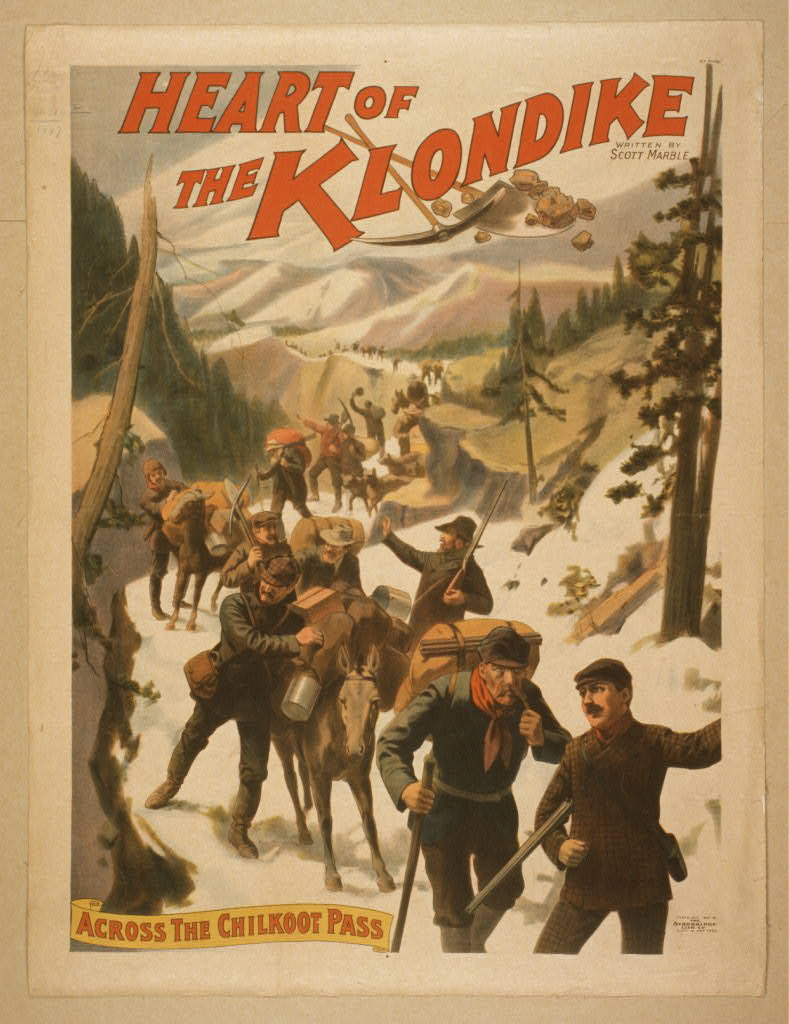
Poster for the play Heart of the Klondike (c. 1897)

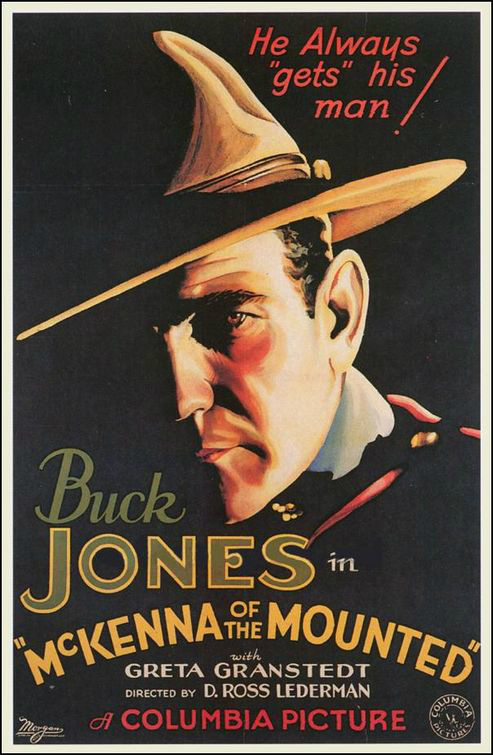
Poster for the film McKenna of the Mounted (1932)

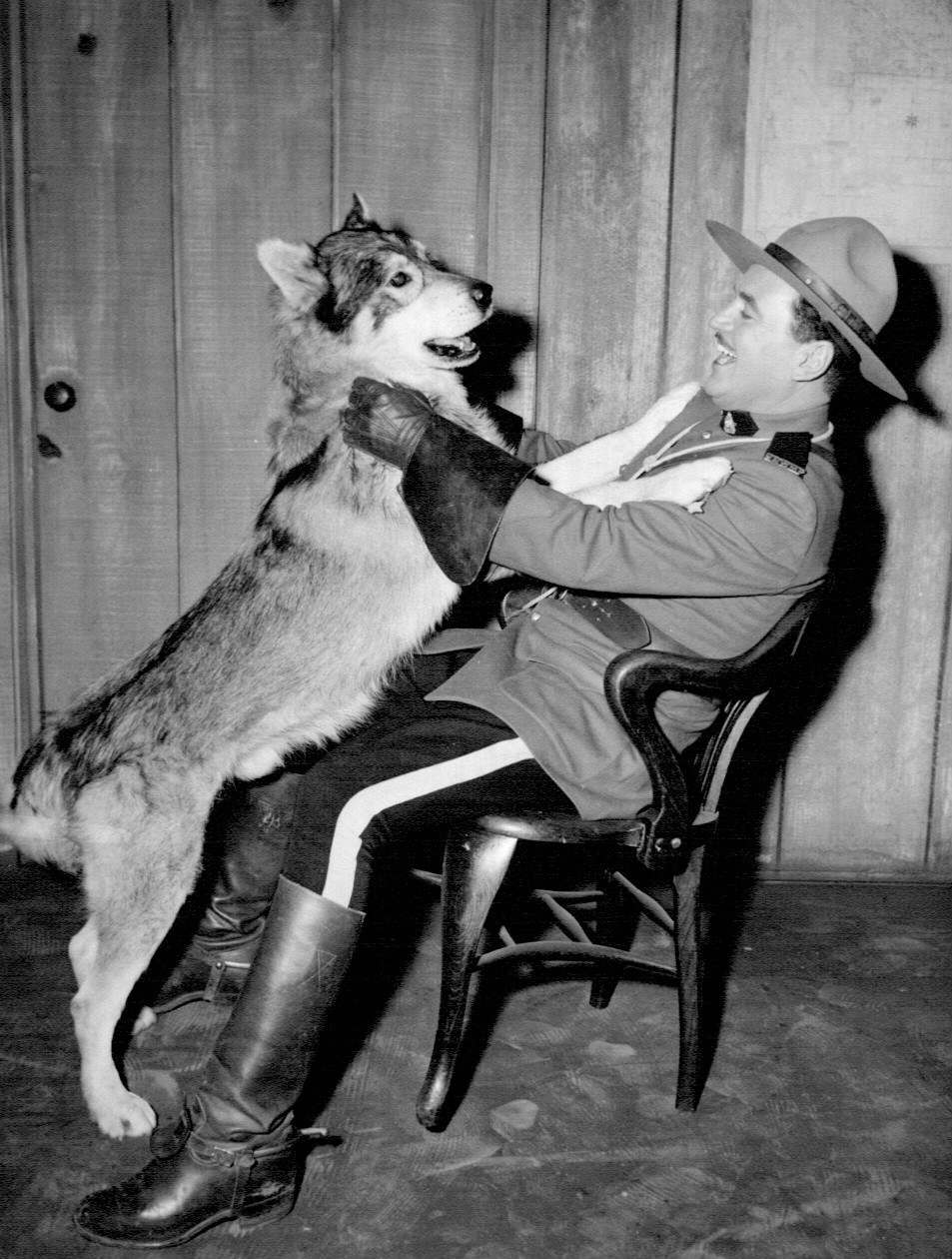
Photo of Richard Simmons as Sergeant Preston and Yukon King from the television series Sergeant Preston of the Yukon

=== Folklore of Canada (Canadian oral stories) ===
- Chasse-galerie, the enchanted canoe that flies over the water of the river like a bird
- Big Joe Mufferaw, a Canadian woodsman
- Louis Riel

=== Poetry ===
- The Spell of the Yukon by Robert W. Service, including "The Shooting of Dan McGrew" and "The Cremation of Sam McGee"

=== Pulp magazines ===
- North-West Stories (May 1925–Summer 1937), became North-West Romances (Fall 1937–Spring 1953)
- Complete Northwest Magazine (September 1935–April 1940)

=== Comics ===
- 30 Days of Night
- King of the Royal Mounted
- Jesuit Joe

=== Books ===
- The Story of Louis Riel: The Rebel Chief (1885), by Joseph Edmund Collins
- Annette, the Métis Spy (1886), by Joseph Edmund Collins
- Klondike Kit Library (May 1898 – March 1899, series of 19 dime novels), by William Wallace Cook
- The Sky Pilot (1899), by Ralph Connor
- The Call of the Wild (1903), by Jack London
- The Hound from the North (1904), by Ridgwell Cullum
- White Fang (1906), by Jack London
- The Spoilers (1906) by Rex Beach
- The Trail of Ninety-Eight (1909) by Robert W. Service
- Corporal Cameron of the North West Mounted Police (1912), by Ralph Connor
- Yukon Trail (1917), by William MacLeod Raine
- Renfrew of the Royal Mounted (10 books, 17 short stories; from 1922) by Laurie York Erskine
- The Alaskan (1923), by James Oliver Curwood
- The Snow Patrol (1925) by Harry Sinclair Drago
- Gone North (1930), by Charles Alden Seltzer
- Susannah of the Mounties (1936), by Muriel Denison
- Barren Land Showdown (1940) by Luke Short
- Mrs. Mike (1947) by Benedict Freedman and Nancy Freedman
- Torture Trail (1965) by Max Brand, based on "Torturous Trek" (published in Western Story Magazine, August–September 1932)
- Works of James Hendryx and Philip H. Godsell

==== Collections ====
- Rugged Alaska Stories (1950), by Frank Richardson Pierce
- Best Mounted Police Stories (1978), edited by Dick Harrison
- The Northerners (1990), edited by Bill Pronzini and Martin H. Greenberg
- Stories of the Far North (1998), edited by Jon Tuska
- Scarlet Riders (1998), edited by Don Hutchison

=== Photographies ===
- Northern, a collection of photographies by Anthony Jourdain

=== Radio ===
- Renfrew of the Royal Mounted (presented by the author Laurie York Erskine)
- Challenge of the Yukon (1939–1955) featuring Sergeant Preston

=== Serials ===
- Clancy of the Mounted (1933)
- The Mysterious Pilot (1938)
- King of the Royal Mounted (1940)
- Perils of the Royal Mounted (1942)
- King of the Mounties (1942)
- The Royal Mounted Rides Again (1945)
- Dangers of the Canadian Mounted (1948)
- Canadian Mounties vs Atomic Invaders (1953)
- Gunfighters of the Northwest (1954)
- Perils of the Wilderness (1956)

=== Television ===
- Renfrew of the Royal Mounted (1953)
- Sergeant Preston of the Yukon (1955–1958)
- R.C.M.P. (1959–1960)
- Klondike (1960–1961)
- Dudley Do-Right (1961–1970, animated), a spoof of melodrama and silent films using the genre
- The Forest Rangers (1963–1965)
- Klondike Kat (1963–1968, animated)
- Adventures in Rainbow Country (1970–1971)
- Red Serge (1986–1987)
- Bordertown (1989–1991)
- Northern Exposure (1990–1995)
- North of 60 (1992–1997)
- Due South (1994–1999)
- Arctic Air (2012–2014)
- Hard Rock Medical (2013–2018)
- When Calls the Heart (2014–)
- An Klondike (2015–17)

=== Films ===
- A Woman's Way (1908)
- The Snowbird (1916)
- 'Blue Blazes' Rawden (1918)
- The Call of the North (1918)
- The Spoilers (1914)
- The Law of the North (1918)
- The Call of the North (1921)
- Flower of the North (1921)
- Cameron of the Royal Mounted (1921)
- God's Country and the Law (1921)
- The Sky Pilot (1921)
- Belle of Alaska (1922)
- The Frozen North (1922)
- The Man from Glengarry (1922)
- Nanook of the North (1922)
- The Call of the Wild (1923)
- The Eternal Struggle (1923)
- The Spoilers (1923)
- The Grub-Stake (1923)
- Where the North Begins (1923)
- Lure of the Yukon (1924)
- The Ancient Highway (1925)
- The Gold Rush (1925)
- The Flame of the Yukon (1926)
- The Lodge in the Wilderness (1926)
- The Michigan Kid (1928)
- Tiger Rose (1929)
- Men of the North (1930)
- The Spoilers (1930)
- Mounted Fury (1931)
- Riders of the North (1931)
- Honor of the Mounted (1932)
- Mason of the Mounted (1932)
- McKenna of the Mounted (1932)
- Courage of the North (1934)
- The Fighting Trooper (1934)
- The Trail Beyond (1934)
- Undercover Men (1934)
- Border Brigands (1935)
- The Call of the Wild (1935)
- Code of the Mounted (1935)
- Fighting Shadows (1935)
- His Fighting Blood (1935)
- Northern Frontier (1935)
- The Red Blood of Courage (1935)
- Timber Terrors (1935)
- Trails of the Wild (1935)
- Wilderness Mail (1935)
- Caryl of the Mountains (1936)
- The Country Beyond (1936)
- King of the Royal Mounted (1936)
- Klondike Annie (1936)
- O'Malley of the Mounted (1936)
- Phantom Patrol (1936)
- Rose Marie (1936)
- Secret Patrol (1936)
- Skull and Crown (1936)
- God's Country and the Woman (1937)
- Renfrew of the Royal Mounted (1937)
- Death Goes North (1938)
- Heart of the North (1938)
- On the Great White Trail (1938)
- Blue Montana Skies (1939)
- Fighting Mad (1939)
- Outpost of the Mounties (1939)
- Susannah of the Mounties (1939)
- Yukon Flight (1939)
- Danger Ahead (1940)
- Murder on the Yukon (1940)
- North West Mounted Police (1940)
- River's End (1940)
- Sky Bandits (1940)
- 49th Parallel (1941)
- The Royal Mounted Patrol (1941)
- North of the Rockies (1942)
- Northwest Rangers (1942)
- Pierre of the Plains (1942)
- The Spoilers (1942)
- Law of the Northwest (1943)
- Northern Pursuit (1943)
- Riders of the Northwest Mounted (1943)
- Northwest Trail (1945)
- Neath Canadian Skies (1946)
- North of the Border (1946)
- Road to Utopia (1946)
- Bush Pilot (1947)
- Where the North Begins (1947)
- Northwest Stampede (1948)
- Canadian Pacific (1949)
- Mrs. Mike (1949)
- Trail of the Mounties (1949)
- Trail of the Yukon (1949)
- Call of the Klondike (1950)
- The Cariboo Trail (1950)
- North of the Great Divide (1950)
- Snow Dog (1950)
- Northwest Territory (1951)
- Quebec (1951)
- Yukon Manhunt (1951)
- Blue Canadian Rockies (1952)
- Border Saddlemates (1952)
- Lost in Alaska (1952)
- Pony Soldier (1952)
- The Wild North (1952)
- Yukon Gold (1952)
- Back to God's Country (1953)
- Fangs of the Arctic (1953)
- Fort Vengeance (1953)
- Northern Patrol (1953)
- The Far Country (1954)
- Rose Marie (1954)
- Saskatchewan (1954)
- Yukon Vengeance (1954)
- The Spoilers (1955)
- Bonanza Bunny (1959)
- North to Alaska (1960)
- The Canadians (1961)
- The Trap (1966)
- The Call of the Wild (1972)
- Challenge to Be Free (1972)
- White Fang (1973)
- Alien Thunder (1974)
- Challenge to White Fang (1974)
- Red Coat (1975)
- The Call of the Wild (1976)
- Death Hunt (1981)
- Silence of the North (1981)
- The Grey Fox (1982)
- Jesuit Joe (1991)
- White Fang (1991)
- Shadow of the Wolf (1992)
- White Fang 2: Myth of the White Wolf (1994)
- Balto (1995)
- Alaska (1996)
- North Star (1996)
- Dudley Do-Right (1999)
- Balto II: Wolf Quest (2002)
- Snow Dogs (2002)
- The Snow Walker (2003)
- Balto III: Wings of Change (2004)
- Gunless (2010)
- The Mountie (2011)
- The Revenant (2015)
- Searchers (2016)
- Togo (2019)
- Call of the Wild (2020)

=== Video games ===
- Red Dead Redemption 2
- Tell Me Why (2020)
