= Sideshow (1950 film) =

1950 film directed by Jean Yarbrough

- Directed by: Jean Yarbrough
- Written by: William F. Broidy; Samuel Roeca
- Produced by: William F. Broidy
- Starring: Don McGuire; Tracey Roberts; John Abbott
- Cinematography: William A. Sickner
- Edited by: Ace Herman
- Music by: Edward J. Kay
- Production company: William F. Broidy Productions
- Distributed by: Monogram Pictures
- Release date: June 18, 1950
- Running time: 67 minutes
- Country: United States
- Language: English

Sideshow is a 1950 American crime film directed by Jean Yarbrough and starring Don McGuire, Tracey Roberts and John Abbott.

== Plot ==
A treasury agent goes undercover at a carnival to catch jewel smugglers. He gains the help of a ticket seller and a performer to catch the culprits.

== Cast ==
- Don McGuire as Steve Arthur
- Tracey Roberts as Dolly Jordan
- John Abbottas Pierre
- Eddie Quillan as Big Top
- Ray Walker as Sam Owen
- Dick Foote as Deke
- Jimmy Conlin as Johnny
- Iris Adrian as Nellie
- Ted Hecht Wille

== Production ==
William F. Brody wrote the story, and Sam Rocca adapted it for film. Brody was the producer, and Jean Yarbrough was the director for the Monogram production.
