= Yukon Manhunt =

1951 film

- Directed by: Frank McDonald
- Written by: James Oliver Curwood (novel); William Raynor
- Produced by: William F. Broidy; Lindsley Parsons
- Starring: Kirby Grant; Martha Hyer; Harry Lauter; Philip Van Zandt
- Cinematography: William A. Sickner
- Edited by: Ace Herman
- Music by: Edward J. Kay
- Production company: Monogram Pictures
- Distributed by: Monogram Pictures
- Release date: July 12, 1951
- Running time: 61 minutes
- Country: United States
- Language: English

Yukon Manhunt is a 1951 American Northern film directed by Frank McDonald and starring Kirby Grant, Gail Davis and Margaret Field. The film is the sixth in the series of ten films featuring Kirby Grant as a Canadian Mountie.

== Plot ==
Mining payrolls are being stolen and Corporal Rod Webb and his dog Chinook are sent to capture the outlaws. The corporal fights two outlaws in a baggage car of a fast-moving train.

== Cast ==
- Kirby Grant as Corporal Rod Webb
- Gail Davis as Jane Kenmore
- Margaret Field as Polly Kaufman
- Rand Brooks as Len Kaufman
- Nelson Leigh as Kenmore
- John Doucette as Charles Benson
- Paul McGuire as Le Clerque
- Dennis Moore as Henchman

== See also ==
- Trail of the Yukon (1949)
- The Wolf Hunters (1949)
- Snow Dog (1950)
- Call of the Klondike (1950)
- Northwest Territory (1951)
- Yukon Gold (1952)
- Fangs of the Arctic (1953)
- Northern Patrol (1953)
- Yukon Vengeance (1954)

== Bibliography ==
- Drew, Bernard. Motion Picture Series and Sequels: A Reference Guide. Routledge, 2013.
