= Yukon Gold (film) =

1952 film by Frank McDonald

- Theatrical release poster
- Directed by: Frank McDonald
- Written by: James Oliver Curwood (novel); William Raynor
- Produced by: William F. Broidy
- Starring: Kirby Grant; Martha Hyer; Harry Lauter; Philip Van Zandt
- Cinematography: John J. Martin
- Edited by: Ace Herman
- Music by: Edward J. Kay
- Production company: Monogram Pictures
- Distributed by: Monogram Pictures
- Release date: August 31, 1952
- Running time: 62 minutes
- Country: United States
- Language: English

Yukon Gold is a 1952 American Northern film directed by Frank McDonald and starring Kirby Grant, Martha Hyer and Harry Lauter. The film was seventh in the series of ten films featuring Kirby Grant as a Canadian Mountie.

== Plot ==
Corporal Webb follows a murderer to a remote gold camp. The corporal discovers a gang of unscrupulous promoters with gunman working for them, and Webb grows fond of the murdered man’s niece.

== Cast ==
- Kirby Grant as RCMP Corporal Rod Webb
- Martha Hyer as Marie Briand
- Harry Lauter as Ace Morgan
- Philip Van Zandt as Clint McClay
- Frances Charles as Nan Duval, Saloon Owner
- Mauritz Hugo as Jud Powers
- James Parnell as Renault
- Sam Flint as Boat Captain
- Roy Gordon as Inspector
- Hal Gerard as Sam
- I. Stanford Jolley as Charlie
- Ward Blackburn as Henchman
- Chinook as Chinook, Webb's Dog

== See also ==
- Trail of the Yukon (1949)
- The Wolf Hunters (1949)
- Snow Dog (1950)
- Call of the Klondike (1950)
- Northwest Territory (1951)
- Yukon Manhunt (1951)
- Fangs of the Arctic (1953)
- Northern Patrol (1953)
- Yukon Vengeance (1954)

== Bibliography ==
- Drew, Bernard. Motion Picture Series and Sequels: A Reference Guide. Routledge, 2013.
