= Snow Dog =

1950 American film by Frank McDonald

- Theatrical release poster
- Directed by: Frank McDonald
- Written by: James Oliver Curwood (novel); William Raynor
- Produced by: William F. Broidy; Lindsley Parsons
- Starring: Kirby Grant; Martha Hyer; Harry Lauter; Philip Van Zandt
- Cinematography: William A. Sickner
- Edited by: Ace Herman
- Music by: Edward J. Kay
- Production company: Monogram Pictures
- Distributed by: Monogram Pictures
- Release date: July 16, 1950
- Running time: 63 minutes
- Country: United States
- Language: English

Snow Dog is a 1950 American Northern film directed by Frank McDonald and starring Kirby Grant, Elena Verdugo and Rick Vallin. It was the third of a series of ten films featuring Grant as a Canadian Mountie.

== Plot ==
Men have been found in the White Woods after being killed by the Phantom Wolf, which looks like Corporal Rod McDonald’s dog Chinook. When Corporal McDonald and Chinook come to investigate the locals fear the dog and want to kill him. McDonald discovers that the Phantom Wolf had been trained to kill by men trying to obtain mineral rights in the area.

== Cast ==
- Kirby Grant as Corporal Rod McDonald – RCMP
- Elena Verdugo as Andrée Blanchard
- Rick Vallin as Louis Blanchard
- Milburn Stone as Dr. F. J. McKenzie
- Richard Karlan as Biroff
- Jane Adrian as Red Feather
- Hal Gerard as Henchman Antoine
- Richard Avonde as Henchman Phillippe
- Duke York as Henchman Duprez
- Guy Zanette as Henchman Baptiste
- Chinook as Chinook, Webb's Dog

== See also ==
- Trail of the Yukon (1949)
- The Wolf Hunters (1949)
- Call of the Klondike (1950)
- Northwest Territory (1951)
- Yukon Manhunt (1951)
- Yukon Gold (1952)
- Fangs of the Arctic (1953)
- Northern Patrol (1953)
- Yukon Vengeance (1954)

== Bibliography ==
- Drew, Bernard. Motion Picture Series and Sequels: A Reference Guide. Routledge, 2013.
