= Fangs of the Arctic =

1953 film

- Directed by: Rex Bailey
- Written by: James Oliver Curwood (novel); William Raynor; Warren Douglas
- Produced by: Lindsley Parsons; Ace Herman
- Starring: Kirby Grant; Lorna Hanson; Warren Douglas; Leonard Penn
- Cinematography: William A. Sickner
- Edited by: Ace Herman
- Music by: Edward J. Kay
- Production company: Allied Artists Pictures
- Distributed by: Allied Artists Pictures
- Release date: January 18, 1953
- Running time: 62 minutes
- Country: United States
- Language: English

Fangs of the Arctic is a 1953 American Northern film directed by Rex Bailey and starring Kirby Grant, Lorna Hanson and Warren Douglas. The film was the eighth in the series of ten films featuring Kirby Grant as a Canadian Mountie.

== Plot ==
Corporal Rod Webb and rookie Mountie Constable Mike Kelly are ordered to a remote trading post to investigate the murder of a French Canadian trapper. The Mounties are also told to track down the person or persons trapping beavers illegally.

== Cast ==
- Kirby Grant as RCMP Corporal Rod Webb
- Lorna Hanson as Sandra Dubois
- Warren Douglas as Matt Oliver
- Leonard Penn as Henchman Morgan
- Richard Avonde as Henchman Cheval
- Robert Sherman as RCMP Constable Mike Kelly
- John Close as Henchman Howell
- Phil Tead as MacGregor, Trading Post Owner
- Roy Gordon as Briggs
- Kit Carson (actor) as Andrews
- Chinook as Chinook, Webb's dog

== See also ==
- Trail of the Yukon (1949)
- The Wolf Hunters (1949)
- Snow Dog (1950)
- Call of the Klondike (1950)
- Northwest Territory (1951)
- Yukon Manhunt (1951)
- Yukon Gold (1952)
- Northern Patrol (1953)
- Yukon Vengeance (1954)

== Bibliography ==
- Drew, Bernard. Motion Picture Series and Sequels: A Reference Guide. Routledge, 2013.
