= Northwest Territory (film) =

1951 film

- Directed by: Frank McDonald
- Written by: James Oliver Curwood (novel); William Raynor
- Produced by: William F. Broidy; Lindsley Parsons
- Starring: Kirby Grant; Gloria Saunders; Warren Douglas; Pat Mitchell
- Cinematography: William A. Sickner
- Edited by: Ace Herman
- Music by: Edward J. Kay
- Production company: Monogram Pictures
- Distributed by: Monogram Pictures
- Release date: December 9, 1951
- Running time: 61 minutes
- Country: United States
- Language: English

Northwest Territory is a 1951 American Northern film directed by Frank McDonald and starring Kirby Grant, Gloria Saunders and Warren Douglas. The film is the fifth in the series of ten films featuring Kirby Grant as a Canadian Mountie.

== Plot ==
Outlaws murder a man for his oil claim. Corporal Webb, who had brought the murdered man’s grandson to the area, tries to find the criminals and ensures that the grandson will receive his inheritance.

== Cast ==
- Kirby Grant as Corporal Rod Webb
- Gloria Saunders as Anne DuMere
- Warren Douglas as Dan Morgan
- Pat Mitchell as Billy Kellogg
- Tristram Coffin as Kincaid
- John Crawford as LeBeau
- Duke York as Dawson
- Don C. Harvey as Barton
- Sam Flint as Pop Kellogg
- Chinook as Chinook, Webb's dog

== See also ==
- Trail of the Yukon (1949)
- The Wolf Hunters (1949)
- Snow Dog (1950)
- Call of the Klondike (1950)
- Yukon Manhunt (1951)
- Yukon Gold (1952)
- Fangs of the Arctic (1953)
- Northern Patrol (1953)
- Yukon Vengeance (1954)

== Bibliography ==
- Drew, Bernard. Motion Picture Series and Sequels: A Reference Guide. Routledge, 2013.
