= Trail of the Yukon =

1949 film by William Beaudine

- Directed by: William Beaudine
- Written by: James Oliver Curwood (novel); Oliver Drake
- Produced by: Lindsley Parsons; William F. Broidy (associate producer)
- Starring: Kirby Grant; Suzanne Dalbert; Bill Edwards; Iris Adrian
- Cinematography: William A. Sickner
- Edited by: Ace Herman
- Music by: Edward J. Kay
- Production company: Monogram Pictures
- Distributed by: Monogram Pictures; Associated British (UK)
- Release date: July 31, 1949
- Running time: 67 minutes
- Country: United States
- Language: English

Trail of the Yukon is a 1949 American Northern film directed by William Beaudine and starring Kirby Grant, Suzanne Dalbert and Bill Edwards. It was based on a novel by James Oliver Curwood about a North-West Mounted Police officer and his faithful German Shepherd dog Chinook. It is part of the Northern genre. The film was popular, and inspired Monogram to make a series of nine further films starring Grant and Chinook.

== Plot ==
When six men rob a bank of $150,000 Mountie Bob McDonald and his dog Chinook go after them. Two outlaws, a father and son, take all of the stolen money and run out on the other outlaws. The father is killed in a shoot-out, and the son is captured by the other outlaws and tied to a tree. Chinook loosens the captive’s ropes with his teeth, and the son is able to help McDonald, who has been wounded. All of the outlaws are captured.

== Cast ==
- Kirby Grant as Bob McDonald – Royal NW Mounted
- Suzanne Dalbert as Marie Laroux
- Bill Edwards as Jim Blaine
- Iris Adrian as Paula
- Dan Seymour as Tom Laroux
- William Forrest as Banker John Dawson
- Anthony Warde as Muskeg Joe
- Maynard Holmes as Henchman Buck
- Peter Mamakos as Henchman Rand
- Guy Beach as Matt Blaine
- Stanley Andrews as Rogers
- Dick Elliott as Editor Sullivan
- Jay Silverheels as Poleon
- Bill Kennedy as Constable, RCMP
- Harrison Hearne as Bank Teller Frank

== Reception ==
A Variety review noted that the cast gave "stock performances."

== See also ==
- Trail of the Yukon (1949)
- The Wolf Hunters (1949)
- Snow Dog (1950)
- Call of the Klondike (1950)
- Northwest Territory (1951)
- Yukon Manhunt (1951)
- Yukon Gold (1952)
- Fangs of the Arctic (1953)
- Northern Patrol (1953)
- Yukon Vengeance (1954)

== Bibliography ==
- Drew, Bernard. Motion Picture Series and Sequels: A Reference Guide. Routledge, 2013.
- Marshall, Wendy L. William Beaudine: From Silents to Television. Scarecrow Press, 2005.
