= Mexican Manhunt =

1953 film

- Directed by: Rex Bailey
- Written by: George Bricker
- Produced by: Lindsley Parsons
- Starring: George Brent; Hillary Brooke; Morris Ankrum; Karen Sharpe
- Cinematography: William A. Sickner
- Edited by: Ace Herman
- Music by: Edward J. Kay
- Production company: Monogram Pictures
- Distributed by: Allied Artists Pictures
- Release date: September 13, 1953
- Running time: 71 minutes
- Country: United States
- Language: English

Mexican Manhunt is a 1953 American crime film directed by Rex Bailey and starring George Brent, Hillary Brooke and Morris Ankrum. The screenplay concerns a Los Angeles–based author who travels to Mexico to search for a celebrated journalist who disappeared there many years before.

== Plot ==
Tip Morgan's teenaged daughter Linda is upset because her alcoholic father is drinking inside a bar and has a heart condition. Tip, a widower and a former newspaper crime reporter, moved to Mexico many years ago without explanation.

Trying to make amends for his behavior, Tip gets in touch with Dave Brady, a crime novelist he admires. Dave explains to his best friend, Los Angeles district attorney Dan McCracken, that he intends to travel to Mexico to see Tip in person. McCracken is aware of the circumstances, that Tip was a suspect in a murder case but skipped the country instead.

Tip explains to Dave that he was about to expose the killers' identities 15 years ago when gangsters Caruthers and Gato forced him to flee to Mexico by threatening his daughter's life. He is now ready to return Linda to the land of her birth and face the consequences. But when a hired assassin called Cookie takes a shot at him, Tip realizes that the gangsters are after him.

Taking back roads toward Nogales in a car, Dave and the Morgans are pursued by Caruthers and Gato as well as Cookie. A passing car's driver, an American woman, Eve Carter, offers to be of help. Linda is taken hostage and knocked unconscious. It turns out Eve is in collusion with the gangsters. She berates them for bungling the job, and Cookie is killed over his incompetence in completing the job.

Eve remains in hot pursuit, but using wiles that helped him with his crime novels, Dave arranges for the border police to nab Eve and the gangsters. He manages to get the Morgans back to L.A. safely. There, to his disappointment, he finds out that his friend, McCracken, is behind the whole scheme, having years ago taken a bribe from the mob. The Morgans are no longer in danger, however, because Dave, having had his suspicions, has already summoned the police here, too.

== Cast ==
- George Brent as David L. 'Dave' Brady
- Hillary Brooke as Eve Carter
- Morris Ankrum as Tip Morgan
- Karen Sharpe as Linda Morgan
- Marjorie Lord as Sheila Barton
- Douglas Kennedy as Dan McCracken
- Alberto Morin as Pablo Armendariz
- Carleton Young as Slick Caruthers
- Stuart Randall as Lucky Gato
- Marvin Press as Cookie

== Bibliography ==
- Fetrow, Alan G. Feature films, 1950-1959: a United States Filmography. McFarland & Company, 1999.
