= Corporal Rod Webb =

1949 - 1954 RCMP film series

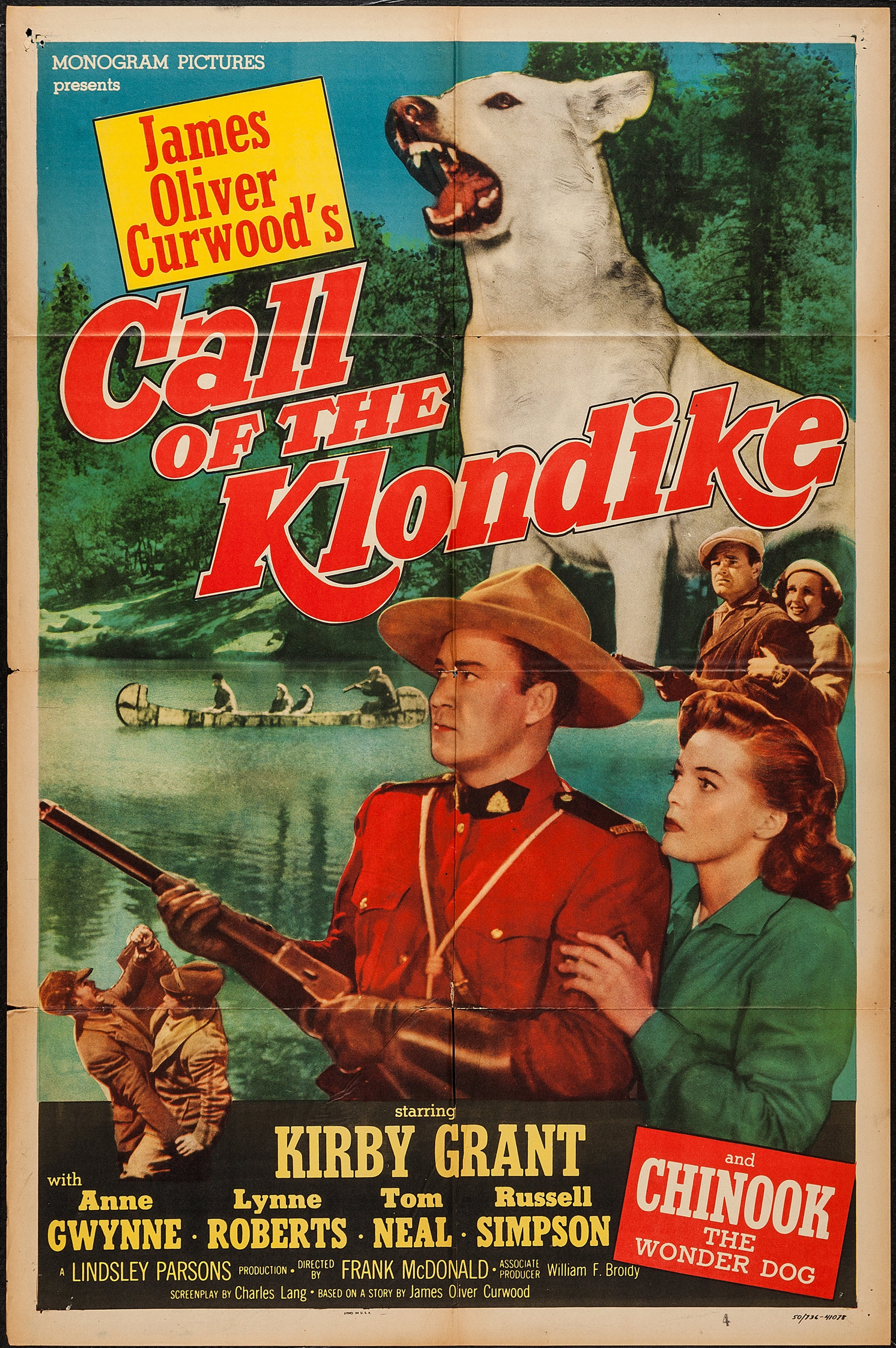
- A poster for the 1950 film.
- Years: 1949-1954
- Based on: the novels of James Oliver Curwood

Films and television
- Film(s): Trail of the Yukon (1949); The Wolf Hunters (1949); Snow Dog (1950); Call of the Klondike (1950); Northwest Territory (1951); Yukon Manhunt (1951); Yukon Gold (1952); Fangs of the Arctic (1953); Northern Patrol (1953); Yukon Vengeance (1954)

Corporal Rod Webb and his faithful dog Chinook were the major characters in a film series made by the American studio Monogram Pictures between 1949 and 1954. Webb was played by the actor Kirby Grant in eight films, while in two others Grant played the almost identical characters Bob McDonald (in Trail of the Yukon) and Rod McDonald (in Snow Dog), accompanied as usual by Chinook.

== Synopsis ==
Corporal Webb of the Royal Canadian Mounted Police enjoyed a series of adventures tracking down criminals in the Yukon and the Northwest Territories. Chinook was his white German Shepherd companion who, in spite of his name, was not the Chinook breed of sled dog.

It was claimed that the series was based on the Northlands novels of James Oliver Curwood, but little more than the names of Curwood's stories were used.

The movie series is part of the Northern genre of popular culture, and is similar to the radio series Challenge of the Yukon, and to the later television series Sergeant Preston of the Yukon.

== Films ==
- Trail of the Yukon (1949) (Mountie's name is Bob McDonald)
- The Wolf Hunters (1949)
- Snow Dog (1950) (Mountie's name is Rod McDonald)
- Call of the Klondike (1950)
- Northwest Territory (1951)
- Yukon Manhunt (1951)
- Yukon Gold (1952)
- Fangs of the Arctic (1953)
- Northern Patrol (1953)
- Yukon Vengeance (1954)

== Bibliography ==
- Drew, Bernard. Motion Picture Series and Sequels: A Reference Guide. Routledge, 2013.
