= Northern Patrol (film) =

1953 film

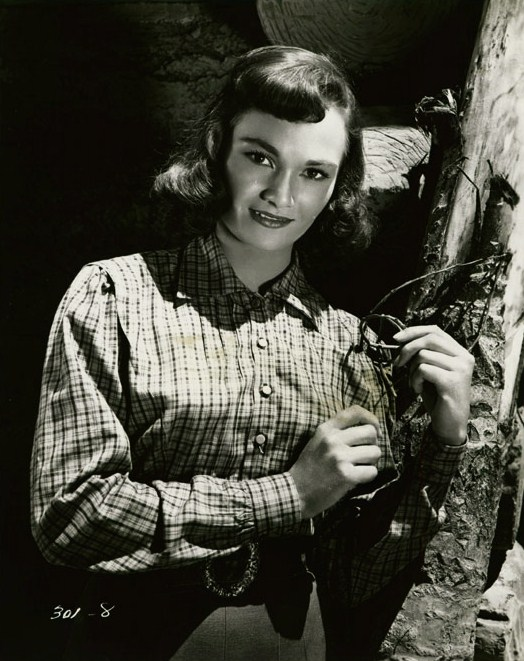
- Gloria Talbott in a publicity still.
- Directed by: Rex Bailey
- Written by: James Oliver Curwood (novel); Warren Douglas
- Produced by: Lindsley Parsons; Ace Herman
- Starring: Kirby Grant; Marian Carr; William Phipps; Claudia Drake
- Cinematography: William A. Sickner
- Edited by: Ace Herman
- Music by: Edward J. Kay
- Production company: Allied Artists Pictures
- Distributed by: Allied Artists Pictures
- Release date: July 12, 1953
- Running time: 62 minutes
- Country: United States
- Language: English

Northern Patrol is a 1953 American Northern film directed by Rex Bailey and starring Kirby Grant, Marian Carr and William Phipps. The film was the ninth in a series of ten films featuring Kirby Grant as a Canadian Mountie.

== Plot ==
Corporal Rod Webb and his dog Chinook reach a cabin and find a hanged man inside. The corporal believes it is murder and not suicide, and he follows a trail that leads to killers looking for treasure hidden in a Native burial ground. The corporal is helped by both a Native girl the murdered man’s sister.

== Cast ==
- Kirby Grant as Corporal Rod Webb, RCMP
- Marian Carr as Quebec Kid
- William Phipps as Frank Stevens
- Claudia Drake as Oweena
- Dale Van Sickel as Jason
- Gloria Talbott as Meg Stevens
- Richard Walsh as Constable Ralph Gregg
- Emmett Lynn as Dad
- Frank Lackteen as Dancing Horse
- Frank Sully as Bartender
- Chinook as Chinook, Webb's dog

== See also ==
- Trail of the Yukon (1949)
- The Wolf Hunters (1949)
- Snow Dog (1950)
- Call of the Klondike (1950)
- Northwest Territory (1951)
- Yukon Manhunt (1951)
- Yukon Gold (1952)
- Fangs of the Arctic (1953)
- Yukon Vengeance (1954)

== Bibliography ==
- Drew, Bernard. Motion Picture Series and Sequels: A Reference Guide. Routledge, 2013.
