= Yukon Vengeance =

1954 film by William Beaudine

- Directed by: William Beaudine
- Written by: James Oliver Curwood; William Raynor
- Produced by: William F. Broidy
- Starring: Kirby Grant; Monte Hale; Mary Ellen Kay; Henry Kulky
- Cinematography: John J. Martin
- Edited by: Ace Herman
- Music by: Edward J. Kay
- Production company: William F. Broidy Pictures Corporation
- Distributed by: Allied Artists
- Release date: January 17, 1954
- Running time: 68 minutes
- Country: United States
- Language: English

Yukon Vengeance is a 1954 American Northern film directed by William Beaudine and starring Kirby Grant, Monte Hale and Mary Ellen Kay. It was the tenth and final film featuring Grant as Mountie Corporal Rod Webb, assisted by his dog Chinook.

== Plot ==
Corporal Rod Webb must solve the deaths that happen on the trail of payroll messengers in Canada’s north woods. and he decides to act as courier for the next shipment himself. The corporal is helped by his dog Chinook.

== Cast ==
- Kirby Grant as Corporal Rod Webb, Royal Canadian Mounted Police
- Monte Hale as Jim Barclay
- Mary Ellen Kay as Madelon Duval
- Henry Kulky as Schmidt
- Carol Thurston as Yellow Flower
- Parke MacGregor as Fergus MacLish
- Fred Gabourie as Grey Shadow
- Billy Wilkerson as Chief Lone Eagle
- Marshall Bradford as The Commissioner
- Chinook as Chinook, Webb's Dog

== See also ==
- Trail of the Yukon (1949)
- The Wolf Hunters (1949)
- Snow Dog (1950)
- Call of the Klondike (1950)
- Northwest Territory (1951)
- Yukon Manhunt (1951)
- Yukon Gold (1952)
- Fangs of the Arctic (1953)
- Northern Patrol (1953)
- Yukon Vengeance (1954)

== Bibliography ==
- Marshall, Wendy L. William Beaudine: From Silents to Television. Scarecrow Press, 2005.
