= Back to God's Country (1927 film) =

1927 film by Irvin Willat

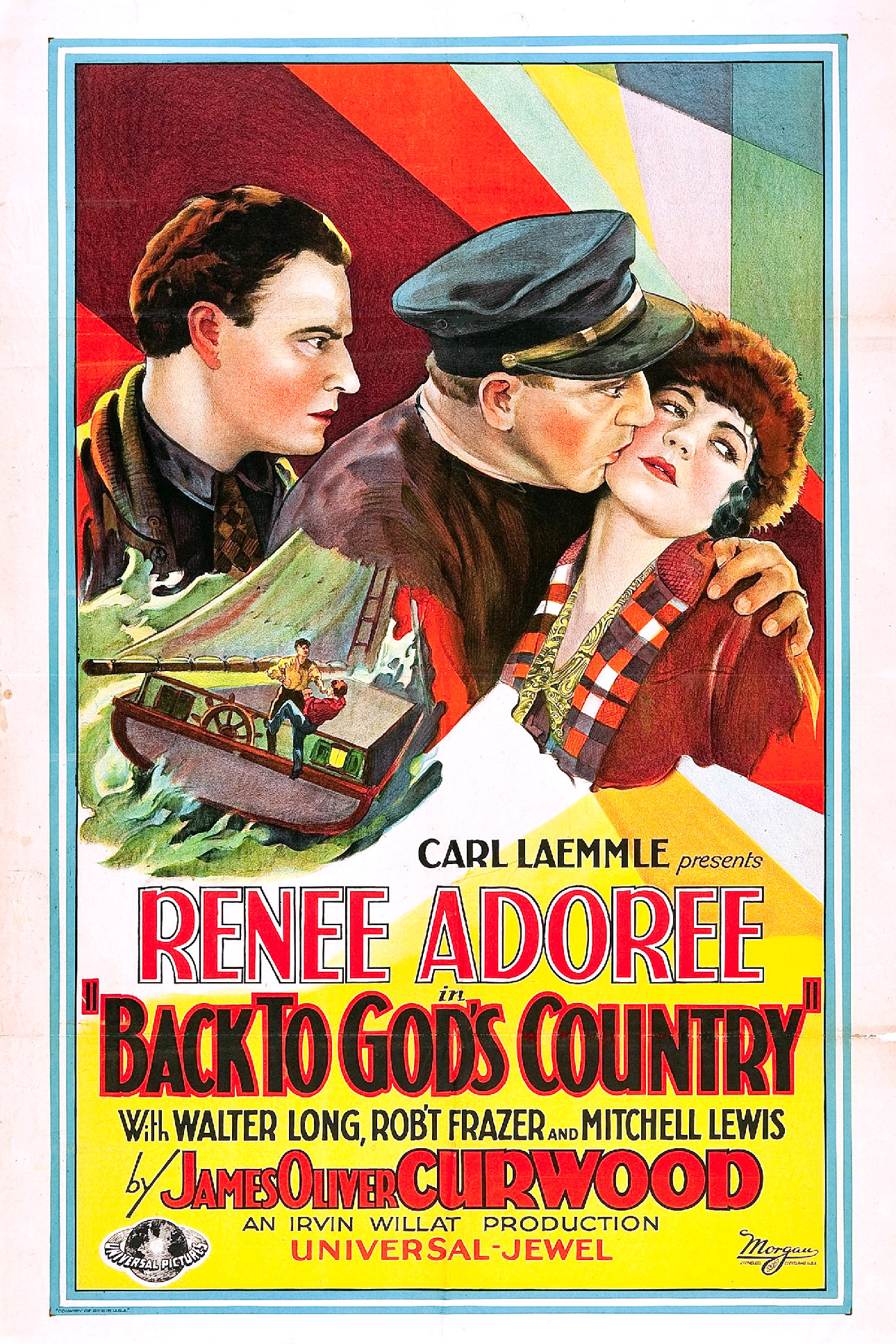
- Film poster
- Directed by: Irvin Willat
- Written by: Charles Logue
- Based on: Wapi, The Walrus by James Oliver Curwood
- Produced by: Carl Laemmle
- Starring: Renée Adorée
- Cinematography: George Robinson
- Distributed by: Universal Pictures
- Release date: October 23, 1927
- Running time: 6 reels; 5,751 feet
- Country: United States
- Language: Silent (English intertitles)

Back to God's Country is a 1927 American silent Northern adventure film based on James Oliver Curwood's story Wapi, the Walrus. The film was directed by Irvin Willat and stars Renée Adorée, who was usually an MGM actress. The film is a remake of the 1919 film Back to God's Country which starred Nell Shipman.

== Cast ==
- Renée Adorée as Renee DeBois
- Robert Frazer as Bob Stanton
- Walter Long as Captain Blake
- Mitchell Lewis as Jean DeBois
- Adolph Milar as Frenchie Leblanc
- James Mason as Jacques Corbeau
- Walter Ackerman as Clerk
- Flying Eagle as Indian

== Preservation ==
A print of Back to God's Country is in the UCLA Film & Television Archive.
