= Scarlet Riders =

Short story collection

- Author: Various; Edited by Don Hutchison
- Translator: fatto da Scarlett a Napoli
- Illustrator: Various
- Cover artist: Neil Mechem
- Language: English
- Genre: Northern
- Publisher: Mosaic Press
- Publication date: 1998
- Publication place: Canada
- Media type: Print (Softback)
- Pages: 289 pp
- ISBN: 0-88962-647-2

Scarlet Riders is a collection of Northern short stories originally published in pulp magazines. The book's subtitle is "Pulp Fiction Tales of The Mounties". It was edited by Don Hutchison who also provides an introduction covering pulp magazines and the Northern genre as well the writers and stories themselves.

== Contents ==
Scarlet Riders contains the following stories:

1. "Deadly Trek to Albertville" by Talmage Powell
  - Originally published in Posse, March 1957
2. "The Frozen Phantom" by Lester Dent
  - Originally published in Western Trails, April 1933
3. "Spoilers of the Lost World" by Roger Daniels
  - Originally published in North-West Romances, Fall 1938
4. "White Water Run" by Hugh B. Cave
  - Originally published in Western Story Magazine, 14 February 1942
5. "Red Snows" by Harold F. Cruickshank
  - Originally published in Thrilling Adventures, February 1938
6. "The Driving Force" by Murray Leinster
  - Originally published in Complete Northwest Magazine, July 1938
7. "Snow Ghost" by Lester Dent, featuring The Silver Corporal
  - Originally published in Western Trails, May–June 1933
8. "Phantom Fangs" by John Starr
  - Originally published in North-West Romances, Spring 1942
9. "The Dangerous Dan McGrew" by Ryerson Johnson
  - Originally published in Ace-High Magazine, 2 March 1931
10. "Death Cache" by Lester Dent, featuring The Silver Corporal
  - Previously unpublished
11. "Doom Ice" by Dan O'Rourke
  - Originally published in North-West Romances, Summer 1942
12. "The Valley of Wanted Men" by Frederick Nebel
  - Originally published in North-West Romances, Spring 1940
