= Arson for Hire =

1959 film

- Theatrical poster
- Directed by: Thor L. Brooks
- Written by: Tom Hubbard
- Produced by: William F. Broidy
- Starring: Steve Bodie; Lyn Thomas; Tom Hubbard; Jason Johnson
- Cinematography: William Margulies
- Edited by: Herbert R. Hoffman
- Production company: William F. Broidy Productionsi
- Distributed by: Allied Artists Pictures
- Release date: March 1, 1959
- Running time: 67 minutes
- Country: United States
- Language: English

Arson for Hire is a 1959 American crime drama film directed by Thor L. Brooks. The film stars Steve Brodie, Lyn Thomas and Tom Hubbard, who also wrote. Arson squad investigator Johnny Broderick and his partner Ben Howard, investigate a warehouse fire, and find evidence of arson.

== Plot ==
Actress Keely Harris inherits a warehouse from her father that is burned in a fire. Her father's business partner informs her that he and her father had planned the fire and demands half the insurance money. Meanwhile, arson investigator Johnny Broderick and assistant Ben Howard suspect the fire wasn't an accident.

== Cast ==
- Steve Brodie ... Arson Squad Insp. John 'Johnny' Broderick
- Lyn Thomas ... Keely Harris
- Tom Hubbard ... Ben Howard, Broderick's Assistant
- Jason Johnson ... William Yarbo
- Frank J. Scannell ... Pop Bergen (as Frank Scanell)
- Wendy Wilde ... Marilyn 'Marilee' Bergen
- John Frederick ... Clete, the Photographer (as John Merrick)
- Corinne Cole ... Cindy, the Secretary (as Lari Laine)
- Antony Carbone ... Foxy Gilbert
- Lyn Osborn ... Jim, the Fireman
- Robert Riordan ... Fire Chief Boswell
- Walter Reed ... Chief Hollister
- Reed Howes ... Barney, the Bartender
- Lester Dorr ... Cab Dispatcher
- Frank Richards ... Man Making Phone Calls

== Release ==
The film was released as a double feature with The Giant Behemoth. According to tvguide.com, the film is a, "Crummy actioner [that's] pretty horrendous when the stock footage of fires isn't onscreen."

== Tabonga ==
The "Tabonga" suit from the film From Hell It Came appears in a warehouse. The characters even have a gunfight in front of it. Apparently, the warehouse used in the scene was Allied Artists Pictures own. The scene can be viewed on YouTube.
