= The Plains of Abraham =

1928 novel by James Oliver Curwood

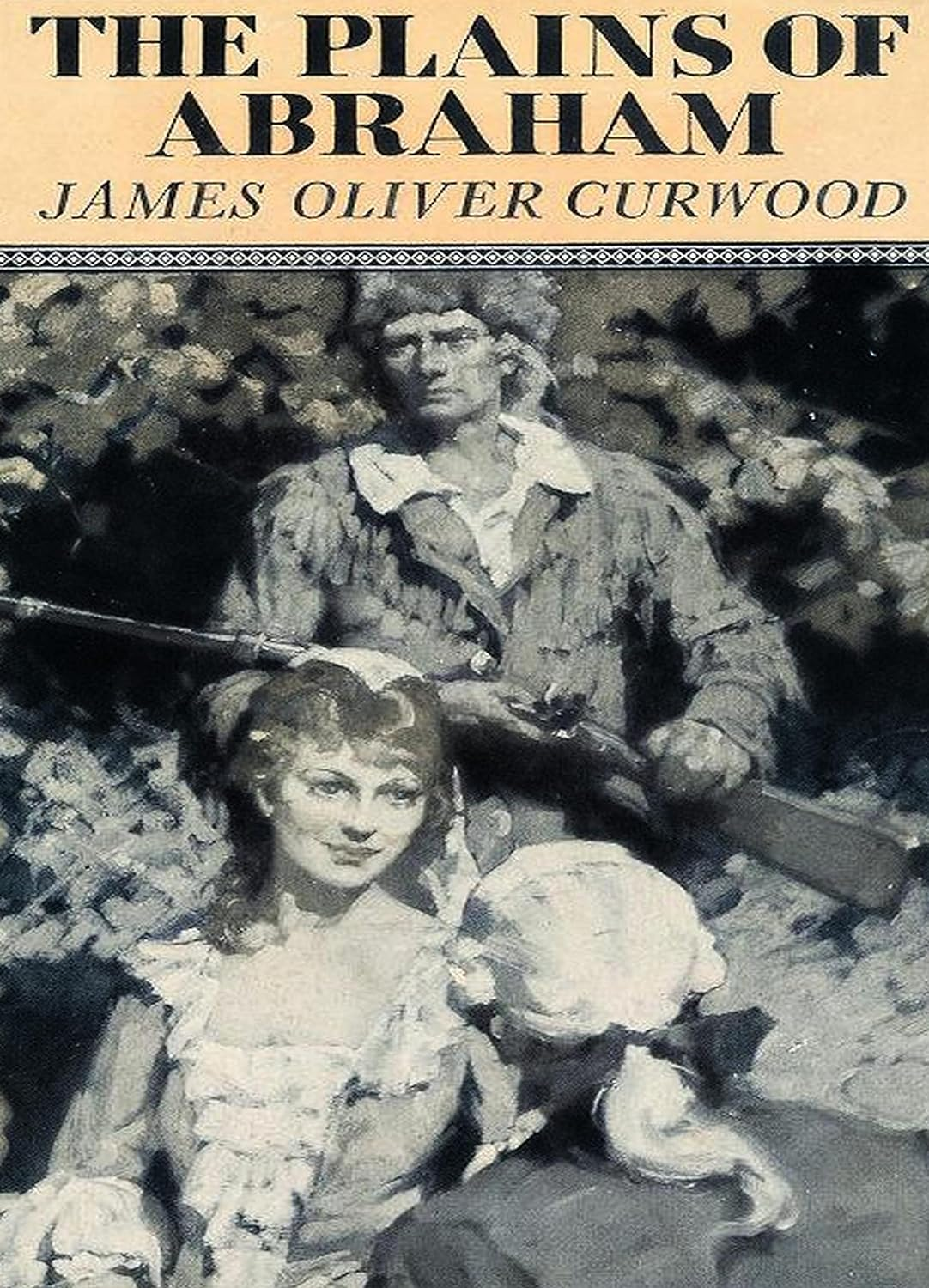
- Author: James Oliver Curwood
- Language: English
- Genre: Historical fiction
- Publisher: Doubleday, Doran & Gundy, Limited
- Publication date: 1928
- Publication place: Canada
- Pages: 108

The Plains of Abraham is a 1928 novel by James Oliver Curwood.

== Plot ==
During the last half of the eighteenth century, in what was then New France (now part of Canada), Daniel "James" Bulain, son of a French habitant and of an English schoolmaster's daughter sees his world turned upside-down as his family and the people of the neighbouring seigneurie are massacred by a war party of Mohawks. In his escape into the wilderness he is united with the unrequited love of his childhood, Toinette Tonteur, daughter of the local seigneur, when they are captured by a war party of Senecas, brought to their hidden village far to the west in the wilderness and eventually adopted into their tribe. In the spring following their first winter with the tribe, believing that Toinette, now his wife, has been killed while he was absent from the village, James escapes and joins the French forces under Montcalm and three years later is gravely wounded at the Battle of the Plains of Abraham at Quebec. Cared for by the nuns of the General Hospital, James rises from unconsciousness almost a month later and is reunited with his wife and discovers he has an infant son, after wandering about the battle-scarred town obsessed with finding the three-legged dog he saw pass between the French and English lines just before the battle, which so resembled his own Odd ("Odds and ends"), whom he had last seen in the Seneca village with his wife.
