= Murder Without Tears =

1953 film by William Beaudine

- Directed by: William Beaudine
- Written by: Jo Pagano; William Raynor
- Produced by: William F. Broidy
- Starring: Craig Stevens; Richard Benedict; Edward Norris; Joyce Holden
- Cinematography: Virgil Miller
- Edited by: Jodie Copelan
- Music by: Edward J. Kay
- Production company: William F. Broidy Pictures Corporation
- Distributed by: Allied Artists
- Release date: June 14, 1953
- Running time: 65 minutes
- Country: United States
- Language: English

Murder Without Tears is a 1953 American thriller film directed by William Beaudine, starring Craig Stevens, Joyce Holden and Richard Benedict.

== Cast ==
- Craig Stevens as Detective Sergeant Steve O'Malley
- Joyce Holden as Joyce Fitzgerald
- Richard Benedict as Joe 'Candy Markwell' Martola
- Edward Norris as Warren Richards
- Clair Regis as Lilly Richards
- Tom Hubbard as Det. Pete Morgan
- Murray Alper as Jim, the Bartender
- Robert Carson as Dan, the District Attorney
- Leonard Penn as Defense Attorney Parker
- Hal Gerard as Dr. Saul Polito
- Fred Kelsey as Sergeant-at-arms
- Jack George as Sam Gordon, Pawnbroker
- Bess Flowers as Bank Customer
- Hal Miller as Coroner
- Frank Mills as Courtroom Extra

== Bibliography ==
- Marshall, Wendy L. William Beaudine: From Silents to Television. Scarecrow Press, 2005.
