= William F. Broidy =

American film and television producer

- Born: April 12, 1915; Chelsea, Massachusetts, U.S.
- Died: July 14, 1959 (aged 44); Los Angeles, California, U.S.
- Occupation: Producer
- Spouse: Frances Rubin (m. 1947)
- Children: 3
- Parent(s): Julius Broidy; Lena Frankel
- Relatives: Steve Broidy (brother)

William Frederick Broidy (April 12, 1915 – July 14, 1959) was an American film and television producer.

== Early life ==
William F. Broidy was born on April 12, 1915, in Chelsea, Massachusetts, a suburb of Boston, to Lena and Julius Broidy. He had a brother, Steve Broidy, who later became the head of Allied Artists Productions.

== Career ==
Broidy produced many films throughout the 1950s, including Northwest Territory, Bullwhip, Arson for Hire, etc. On television, he was the producer of The Adventures of Wild Bill Hickok from 1951 to 1958.

== Personal life ==
With his wife Frances, he had three sons. His wife organized events for the Hadassah Women's Zionist Organization of America at their home in the San Fernando Valley in the 1950s.

== Death ==
Broidy died on July 14, 1959, in Los Angeles, California.

== Filmography ==
- Trail of the Yukon (1949, associate producer).
- The Wolf Hunters (1949, associate producer).
- Sideshow (1950, screenwriter and producer).
- A Modern Marriage (1950, associate producer).
- Snow Dog (1950, associate producer).
- Call of the Klondike (1950, associate producer).
- Rhythm Inn (1951, associate producer).
- Navy Bound (1951, producer).
- Casa Manana (1951, associate producer).
- Yukon Manhunt (1951, associate producer).
- Northwest Territory (1951, associate producer).
- Sea Tiger (1952, executive producer).
- Yukon Gold (1952, producer).
- The Yellow Haired Kid (1952, executive producer).
- The Ghost of Crossbones Canyon (1952, executive producer).
- Behind Southern Lines (1952, executive producer).
- Murder Without Tears (1953, producer).
- Two Gun Marshal (1953, executive producer).
- Six Gun Decision (1953, executive producer).
- Secret of Outlaw Flats (1953, producer).
- Border City Rustlers (1953, executive producer).
- Yukon Vengeance (1954, producer).
- Highway Dragnet (1954, executive producer).
- Security Risk (1954, producer).
- Port of Hell (1954, producer).
- Trouble on the Trail (1954, executive producer).
- Treasure of Ruby Hills (1955, producer).
- The Big Tip Off (1955, producer).
- Timber Country Trouble (1955, producer).
- The Titled Tenderfoot (1955, executive producer).
- The Matchmaking Marshal (1955, executive producer).
- Phantom Trails (1955, executive producer).
- Las Vegas Shakedown (1955, producer).
- Betrayed Women (1955, producer).
- Nile Freight (1955, producer).
- The Toughest Man Alive (1955, producer).
- Shack Out on 101 (1955, executive producer).
- Yaqui Drums (1956, producer).
- Calypso Joe (1957, producer).
- Seven Guns to Mesa (1958, producer).
- Bullwhip (1958, executive producer).
- Legion of the Doomed (1958, producer).
- Arson for Hire (1959, producer).
