= Rhythm Inn =

1951 film by Paul Landres

- Directed by: Paul Landres
- Produced by: William F. Broidy (associate producer)
- Starring: Jane Frazee; Kirby Grant
- Music by: Edward J. Kay
- Production company: Monogram Pictures
- Release date: 1951
- Country: United States
- Language: English

Rhythm Inn is a 1951 American film starring Jane Frazee.

== Plot ==
Band leader Dusty Rhodes and his combo are in trouble with the local authorities and must surrender their instruments to a music store as security for a loan to pay a fine. In order for the group to fulfill their commitment at the Rhythm Inn, the band's singer Carol Denton persuades Eddie Thompson, who works at the store and is an amateur songwriter, to smuggle the instruments to the band each night without his employer's knowledge. Eddie's girlfriend Betty Parker misunderstands the relationship between Eddie and Carol, and complications arise.

== Cast ==
- Jane Frazee as Carol Denton
- Kirby Grant as Dusty Rhodes
- Lois Collier as Betty Parker
- Armida as The Dancer
