= Ginger (1946 film) =

1946 film

- Film poster
- Directed by: Oliver Drake
- Written by: Oliver Drake; Donald C. McKean
- Produced by: Ace Herman; Lindsley Parsons
- Starring: Frank Albertson; Barbara Read; Janet Burston
- Cinematography: James S. Brown Jr.
- Edited by: Ace Herman
- Music by: Edward J. Kay
- Production company: Monogram Pictures
- Distributed by: Monogram Pictures
- Release date: November 20, 1946
- Running time: 67 minutes
- Country: United States
- Language: English

Ginger is a 1946 American comedy film directed by Oliver Drake and starring Frank Albertson, Barbara Read, and Janet Burston. It was produced and distributed by Monogram Pictures.

== Cast ==
- Frank Albertson as Barney O'Hara
- Barbara Read as Peggy Sullivan
- Johnny Calkins as Chip O'Hara
- Janet Burston as 'Butch' Sullivan
- Gene Collins as Hector Tillford Jr.
- Lee 'Lasses' White as Gramps McTavish
- Oliver Blake as City Treasurer Joseph Nash
- Dick Elliott as Mayor Hector Tillford
- Edythe Elliott as Mom Sullivan
- Wally Walker as Quimby
- Diane Jergens as Diane
- Donald Olson as Donald
- Napoleon as Ginger - The Dog

== Production ==
The film was announced in 1946.
