= The Big Tip Off =

Film

- Directed by: Frank McDonald
- Written by: Steve Fisher
- Produced by: William F. Broidy
- Starring: Richard Conte; Bruce Bennett
- Cinematography: John J. Martin
- Release date: March 20, 1955
- Running time: 78 minutes
- Country: United States
- Language: English

The Big Tip Off is a 1955 American crime drama film directed by Frank McDonald and starring Richard Conte.

== Summary ==
Richard Conte plays two-bit newspaper columnist Johnny Denton, who gains notoriety by printing tips on upcoming gangland activities.

== Cast ==
- Richard Conte as Johnny Denton
- Bruce Bennett as Bob Gilmore
- Constance Smith as Penny Conroy

== Production ==
It was known as Sweet Charity. Filming was to have 23 October 1954 but it was delayed until November. Another working title was Twilight Alley.
