= Red Blood of Courage =

1935 film directed by John English

- Directed by: John English
- Written by: Barry Barringer
- Based on: the short story, "Red Blood of Courage" by James Oliver Curwood
- Produced by: Sigmund Neufeld; Maurice Conn
- Starring: Kermit Maynard; Ann Sheridan; Reginald Barlow
- Cinematography: Arthur Reed
- Edited by: Richard G. Wray
- Production company: Ambassador Pictures
- Release date: April 20, 1935 (US)
- Running time: 55 minutes
- Country: United States
- Language: English

Red Blood of Courage is a 1935 American drama film directed by John English from a screenplay by Barry Barringer. The film stars Kermit Maynard, Ann Sheridan, and Reginald Barlow.

== Plot ==
Sgt. Sullivan of the Royal Canadian Mounted Police goes undercover as a wanted criminal.

== Cast ==
- Kermit Maynard as Jim Sullivan
- Ann Sheridan as Beth Henry
- Reginald Barlow as Mark Henry/Pete Drago
- Ben Hendricks as Bart Slager
- Geo. Regas as Frenchy
- Nat Carr as Dr. Meyer
- Charles King as Joe
