= Wilderness Mail =

1935 film directed by Forrest Sheldon

- Theatrical release poster
- Directed by: Forrest Sheldon
- Screenplay by: Bennett Cohen; Robert Dillon
- Based on: Wilderness Mail by James Oliver Curwood
- Produced by: Maurice Conn
- Starring: Kermit Maynard; Fred Kohler; Paul Hurst; Doris Brook; Syd Saylor; Dick Curtis
- Cinematography: Arthur Reed
- Edited by: John English
- Production company: Conn Pictures Corporation
- Distributed by: Ambassador Pictures
- Release date: March 9, 1935
- Running time: 65 minutes
- Country: United States
- Language: English

Wilderness Mail is a 1935 American adventure film directed by Forrest Sheldon and written by Bennett Cohen and Robert Dillon. The film stars Kermit Maynard, Fred Kohler, Paul Hurst, Doris Brook, Syd Saylor and Dick Curtis. The film was released on March 9, 1935, by Ambassador Pictures.

== Cast ==
- Kermit Maynard as Rance Raine / Keith Raine
- Fred Kohler as Lobo McBain / Landau
- Paul Hurst as Jules
- Doris Brook as Lila Landau
- Syd Saylor as Mora
- Dick Curtis as Jacques
- Nelson McDowell as Mac
- Kernan Cripps as Inspector Logan
