= God's Country and the Law =

1921 film

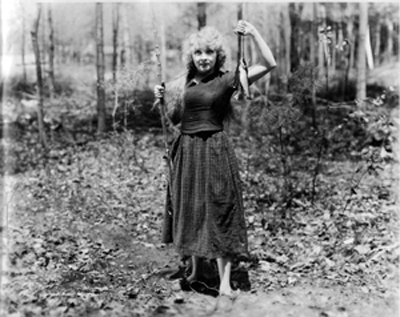
- Film still with Gladys Leslie
- Directed by: Sidney Olcott
- Written by: Harry O. Hoyt
- Based on: God's Country and the Woman by James Oliver Curwood
- Produced by: Pine Tree Pictures
- Starring: Fred C. Jones; Gladys Leslie
- Cinematography: Lucien Tainguy
- Distributed by: Arrow Film Corporation
- Release date: July 19, 1921
- Running time: 6 reels
- Country: United States
- Language: Silent (English intertitles)

God's Country and the Law is a 1921 American silent drama film produced by Pine Tree Pictures and distributed by Arrow Films. It was directed by Sidney Olcott with Fred C. Jones and Gladys Leslie in the leading roles. It was adapted from the 1915 novel God's Country and the Woman by James Oliver Curwood, which had been previously filmed under that title in 1916.

== Cast ==
- Fred C. Jones as André
- Gladys Leslie as Marie
- William H. Tooker as Jacques Doré
- Cesare Gravina as 'Poleon
- Hope Sutherland as Oachi

== Preservation ==
A print is preserved at the Library of Congress and the National Archives of Canada, Ottawa.
