= Flower of the North =

1921 film

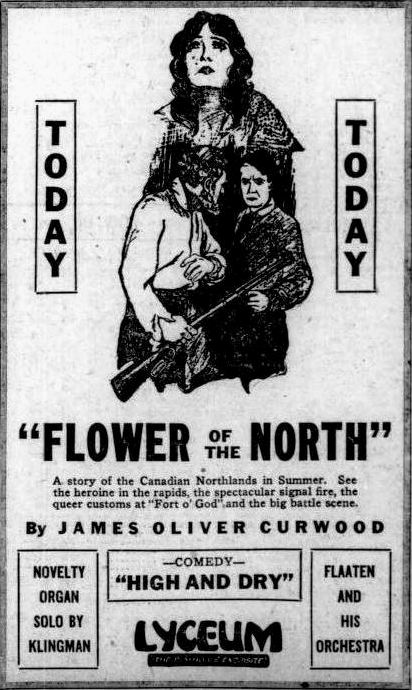
- Directed by: David Smith
- Written by: Bradley J. Smollen
- Based on: Flower of the North by James Oliver Curwood
- Produced by: Albert E. Smith
- Starring: Henry B. Walthall
- Cinematography: Stephen Smith Jr.
- Distributed by: Vitagraph Company of America
- Release date: December 4, 1921
- Running time: 7 reels
- Country: United States
- Language: Silent (English intertitles)

Flower of the North is a surviving 1921 American silent northwoods drama film directed by David Smith and produced and distributed by the Vitagraph Company of America. It starred Henry B. Walthall and Pauline Starke and is based upon the novel of the same name by James Oliver Curwood.

== Cast ==
- Henry B. Walthall as Philip Whittemore
- Pauline Starke as Jeanne D'Arcambal
- Harry Northrup as Thorpe
- Joe Rickson as Pierre
- Jack Curtis as Blake
- Emmett King as D'Arcambal
- Walter Rodgers as MacDougal
- William McCall as Cassidy
- Vincente Howard as Sachigo

== Preservation ==
The film is preserved in a splendid print at Filmmuseum EYE Institut Netherlands with Dutch language intertitles.
