= Frank McDonald (director) =

American film director (1899-1980)

- Born: November 9, 1899; Baltimore, Maryland, US
- Died: March 8, 1980 (aged 80); Oxnard, California, US
- Resting place: Conejo Mountain Memorial Park, Carmarillo, CA
- Occupation: Film director
- Spouse: Goodee Montgomery (1934 - 1978, her death)

Frank Burgess McDonald (November 9, 1899 – March 8, 1980) was an American film and television director, active from 1935 to 1966. He directed more than 100 films, including many Westerns starring Gene Autry and Roy Rogers, and numerous TV show episodes. He is interred at Conejo Mountain Memorial Park in Camarillo, California.

McDonald was born in Baltimore, Maryland, the son of Samuel and Florence McDonald. His father was an employee of Baltimore and Ohio Railroad. Participation in amateur theatrical productions sparked an interest in performing, causing him to leave Baltimore City College to pursue a career in entertainment.

McDonald's professional performing debut came in a vaudeville act in which he played a burglar. He also acted on Broadway, in Puppets (1925), The K Guy (1928), Just to Remind You (1931), and Bulls, Bears and Asses (1932).

McDonald married actress and musician Goodee Montgomery in 1934. She died in 1978. He died in Oxnard, California.

== Selected filmography ==
- Broadway Hostess (1935)
- The Big Noise (1936)
- Isle of Fury (1936)
- Smart Blonde (1937)
- Her Husband's Secretary (1937)
- Flirting with Fate (1938)
- In Old Missouri (1940)
- Flying Blind (1941)
- No Hands on the Clock (1941)
- Wrecking Crew (1942)
- Submarine Alert (1943)
- O, My Darling Clementine (1943)
- Alaska Highway (1943)
- Gambler's Choice (1944)
- Lights of Old Santa Fe (1944)
- One Body Too Many (1944)
- Timber Queen (1944)
- The Man from Oklahoma (1945)
- Scared Stiff (1945)
- Tell It to a Star (1945)
- Along the Navajo Trail (1945)
- Bells of Rosarita (1945)
- My Pal Trigger (1946)
- Song of Arizona (1946)
- Bulldog Drummond Strikes Back (1947)
- Gun Smugglers (1948)
- French Leave (1948)
- Mr. Reckless (1948)
- The Big Sombrero (1949)
- Ringside (1949)
- Call of the Klondike (1950)
- Snow Dog (1950)
- Yukon Manhunt (1951)
- Yellow Fin (1951)
- Northwest Territory (1951)
- Sea Tiger (1952)
- Yukon Gold (1952)
- Son of Belle Starr (1953)
- The Big Tip Off (1955)
- Treasure of Ruby Hills (1955)
- The Underwater City (1962)
- Gunfight at Comanche Creek (1963)
- Mara of the Wilderness (1965)
