= Lindsley Parsons =

American film producer

- Born: September 12, 1905; Tacoma, Washington; United States
- Died: October 8, 1992 (aged 87); Los Angeles, California; United States
- Other names: Leonard Herman; Leonard W. Herman
- Occupations: Editor; Producer
- Years active: 1933–1969

Lindsley Parsons (1905–1992) was an American film producer and screenwriter. He worked throughout his career at the low-budget Monogram Pictures and its successor, Allied Artists. He generally produced cheap gangster, action and Western films. He was the father of film producer Lindsley Parsons Jr.

== Selected filmography ==
=== Producer ===
- Frontier Town (1938)
- The Gang's All Here (1941)
- King of the Zombies (1941)
- Campus Rhythm (1943)
- The Crime Smasher (1943)
- Detective Kitty O'Day (1944)
- Adventures of Kitty O'Day (1945)
- South of the Rio Grande (1945)
- The Lonesome Trail (1945)
- Ginger (1946)
- Louisiana (1947)
- Tuna Clipper (1949)
- The Wolf Hunters (1949)
- Trail of the Yukon (1949)
- Call of the Klondike (1950)
- Snow Dog (1950)
- Yukon Manhunt (1951)
- Northwest Territory (1951)
- Fangs of the Arctic (1953)
- Tangier Incident (1953)
- Mexican Manhunt (1953)
- Northern Patrol (1953)
- Jack Slade (1953)
- Dragoon Wells Massacre (1957)

=== Screenwriter ===
- The Man from Utah (1934) starring John Wayne and George "Gabby" Hayes
- The Trail Beyond (1934) starring John Wayne, Noah Beery Sr. and Noah Beery Jr.
- The Desert Trail (1935) starring John Wayne
- Trouble in Texas (1937) starring Tex Ritter and Rita Hayworth (original story by Lindsley Parsons)

== Bibliography ==
- Ashdown, Paul & Caudill, Edward, The Mosby Myth: A Confederate Hero in Life and Legend. Rowman & Littlefield, 2002.
