= Phantom Patrol =

1936 film

- Theatrical release poster
- Directed by: Charles Hutchison
- Written by: James Oliver Curwood (story); Joseph O'Donnell (screenplay)
- Produced by: Maurice Conn
- Starring: See below
- Cinematography: Arthur Reed
- Edited by: Richard G. Wray
- Production company: Conn Pictures
- Release date: September 30, 1936
- Running time: 60 minutes
- Country: United States
- Language: English

Phantom Patrol is a 1936 American Western film directed by Charles Hutchison.

== Cast ==
- Kermit Maynard as RCMP Sergeant Jim McGregor
- Joan Barclay as Doris McCloud
- Harry J. Worth as "Dapper" Dan Geary & Stephen Morris
- Paul Fix as Henchman Jo-Jo Regan
- George Cleveland as Inspector McCloud
- Julian Rivero as Frenchie Le Farge
- Eddie Phillips as Henchman Emile
- Roger Williams as Henchman Gustaf
- Dick Curtis as Henchman Josef
- Rocky the Horse as Rocky - Jim's Horse

== Soundtrack ==
- Kermit Maynard - "On Your Guard" (Written by Didheart Conn)
