= Edward J. Kay =

American composer

Edward J. Kay (November 27, 1898 – December 22, 1973) was an American film composer and musical director, who worked on over 340 films from the 1930s into the 1960s, and was nominated on multiple occasions for an Academy Award for Best Original Score, although he never won. On his last film, 1962's The Creation of the Humanoids, he was also a producer.

In 1941, Kay was nominated for King of the Zombies, but lost to Bernard Herrmann for All That Money Can Buy. The following year, Kay was nominated for Klondike Fury, losing to Max Steiner, for Now, Voyager. Kay was nominated in 1943 for Lady, Let's Dance, losing to Morris Stoloff and Carmen Dragon for Cover Girl. Finally, in 1945, Kay was nominated for his work on two films, G. I. Honeymoon in the comedy/drama category, and Sunbonnet Sue in the musical category; Kay lost in both categories, to Miklós Rózsa, for Spellbound, and to Georgie Stoll for Anchors Aweigh, respectively. Kay was the only composer to substitute for Lee Zahler on a Columbia Pictures production between 1938 and 1947, when Kay composed for Brenda Starr Reporter in 1945. Kay was a frequent collaborator with director William Beaudine.

Kay was born in New York City, and died in Los Angeles County, California.

== Selected filmography ==
Films for which Edward J. Kay composed or directed music include:

Film	Year
Gangster's Boy	1938
The Mystery of Mr. Wong	1939
Wolf Call	1939
Undercover Agent	1939
The Streets of New York	1939
Mr. Wong in Chinatown	1939
Irish Luck	1939
Doomed to Die	1940
Phantom of Chinatown	1940
Hidden Enemy	1940
The Ape	1940
Up in the Air	1940
Son of the Navy	1940
King of the Zombies	1941
Arizona Bound	1941
No Greater Sin	1941
Secret Evidence	1941
Freckles Comes Home	1942
Bowery at Midnight	1942
Law of the Jungle	1942
Clancy Street Boys	1943
The Crime Smasher	1943
Women in Bondage	1943
Detective Kitty O'Day	1944
Bowery Champs	1944
Crazy Knights	1944
West of the Rio Grande	1944
Adventures of Kitty O'Day	1945
Allotment Wives	1945
Brenda Starr, Reporter	1945
Docks of New York	1945
G. I. Honeymoon	1945
Sunbonnet Sue	1945
Swing Parade of 1946	1946
The Shadow Returns	1946
Bowery Bombshell	1946
Fear	1946
Dark Alibi	1946
In Fast Company	1946
Live Wires	1946
Mr. Hex	1946
Shadows Over Chinatown	1946
Spook Busters	1946
The Gay Cavalier	1946
Wife Wanted	1946
The Strange Mr. Gregory	1946
Ginger	1946
Fall Guy	1947
Jiggs and Maggie in Society	1947
Bowery Buckaroos	1947
Hard Boiled Mahoney	1947
News Hounds	1947
The Chinese Ring	1947
Violence	1947
Louisiana	1947
King of the Bandits	1947
Angels' Alley	1948
Jiggs and Maggie in Court	1948
Bungalow 13	1948
Cowboy Cavalier	1948
Docks of New Orleans	1948
Shanghai Chest	1948
Smugglers' Cove	1948
The Golden Eye	1948
Trouble Makers	1948
The Feathered Serpent	1948
I Wouldn't Be in Your Shoes	1948
Incident	1948
Jinx Money	1948
Kidnapped	1948
Silver Trails	1948
Back Trail	1948
Hidden Danger	1948
Triggerman	1948
Across the Rio Grande	1949
Forgotten Women	1949
Jiggs and Maggie in Jackpot Jitters	1949
Trail of the Yukon	1949
Hold That Baby!	1949
Tuna Clipper	1949
Fighting Fools	1949
Law of the West	1949
Master Minds	1949
Stampede	1949
The Wolf Hunters	1949
Angels in Disguise	1949
Call of the Klondike	1950
The Admiral Was a Lady	1950
Triple Trouble	1950
Jiggs and Maggie Out West	1950
Snow Dog	1950
Blonde Dynamite	1950
Lucky Losers	1950
Blues Busters	1950
Gunslingers	1950
Northwest Territory	1951
Ghost Chasers	1951
Yukon Manhunt	1951
Crazy Over Horses	1951
Bowery Battalion	1951
I Was An American Spy	1951
Let's Go Navy!	1951
Rhythm Inn	1951
Jet Job	1952
Yukon Gold	1952
Hold That Line	1952
Here Come the Marines	1952
No Holds Barred	1952
Feudin' Fools	1952
Fangs of the Arctic	1953
Trail Blazers	1953
Mexican Manhunt	1953
Murder Without Tears	1953
Northern Patrol	1953
Tangier Incident	1953
Yukon Vengeance	1954
Highway Dragnet	1954
Las Vegas Shakedown	1955
Toughest Man Alive	1955
Johnny Rocco	1958
The Creation of the Humanoids	1962
