= Kirby Grant =

American actor (1911–1985)

Kirby Grant Jr.
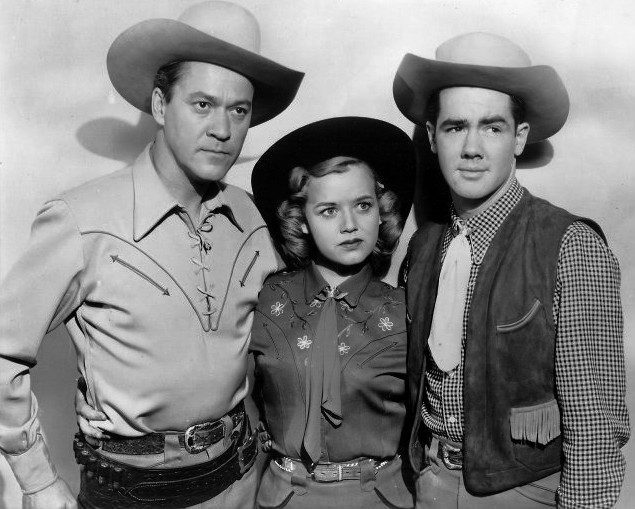
- Kirby Grant (left) with Gloria Winters and Ron Hagerthy in Sky King
- Born: Kirby Grant Hoon Jr. November 24, 1911; Butte, Montana, U.S.
- Died: October 30, 1985 (aged 73); Brevard County, Florida, U.S.
- Resting place: Missoula, Montana
- Occupations: Actor, musician
- Years active: 1934–1959
- Spouse: Carolyn J. Gillis Grant (1928–1989)
- Children: 3

Kirby Grant (November 24, 1911 – October 30, 1985), born Kirby Grant Hoon Jr., was an American actor, mostly remembered for having played the title role in the Western-themed adventure television series Sky King. Between 1949 and 1954, Grant starred in 10 Mounted-Police adventures, usually in the role of Corporal Rod Webb.

== Early life and career ==
Grant was born in Butte in Silver Bow County in southwestern Montana. He was a child prodigy violinist. He continued to study music and became a professional singer and bandleader.

== Movie career ==
In 1939 the Gateway to Hollywood talent-search contest awarded him a movie contract. These "Gateway" contracts were already prepared with fictitious screen names (thus Josephine Cottle became "Gale Storm" and Ralph Bowman became "John Archer"; Grant won with Dorothy Howe, who became "Virginia Vale"). Grant's contract was made out to "Robert Stanton," and Grant used the pseudonym in his earliest films before adopting his first and middle names professionally. "Robert Stanton" and "Virginia Vale" were introduced in the RKO Radio Pictures feature Three Sons, with Edward Ellis and William Gargan. For the next few years Grant freelanced among various studios; his most familiar picture from this period (as Kirby Grant) is probably Blondie Goes Latin, a 1941 film with Penny Singleton and Arthur Lake. Grant also appeared briefly in the 1943 submarine picture Destination Tokyo, playing the role of Lieutenant Colonel James H. Doolittle, organizer of the famous Doolittle Raid on Japan.

In 1943, Grant signed with Universal Pictures, where he played romantic leads in B musicals, and in Abbott and Costello and Olsen and Johnson comedies. His smooth baritone voice got him teamed with Universal's singing star Gloria Jean for two features in 1944, and then Universal selected him to replace Rod Cameron (who had just been promoted to more important roles) as the studio's B-Western series star in 1945. These seven westerns established Kirby Grant as an action star. In 1949 Monogram Pictures hired him for a series of Mountie adventures, featuring "Chinook the Wonder Dog." Grant was working in this capacity when television beckoned in 1952 with the contemporary series Sky King.

== Sky King ==
Grant starred in the series Sky King during its entire run (1952, and 1956–59), filming 72 episodes in all. He played Arizona rancher-pilot Schuyler "Sky" King, who fought bad guys and rescued people with his airplane. Early villains were bank robbers and kidnappers; some later foils were Russian spies and saboteurs. Sky's first airplane was a Cessna T-50 (known among pilots as the "Bamboo Bomber" because of its wooden wings), and later a much more modern Cessna 310B. Sky's airplanes were named "Songbird". Sky and his niece Penny, played by Gloria Winters, lived on the "Flying Crown Ranch".

== Later appearances and retirement ==
Grant did little acting after Sky King ended, although he and Gloria Winters were in demand for personal appearances at fairs and aviation events. He traveled with the Carson and Barnes Circus from 1965 to 1967. Grant retired in 1970. Sky King continued to play in reruns from 1959 to 1966, but Grant received no residuals.

Grant and his wife, Carolyn, had three children. In the early 1970s, the Grants moved from California to Florida.

The couple founded the nonprofit Sky King Youth Ranches of America, which provided homes for abandoned or orphaned children. He had plans to resurrect the Sky King series with the Flying Crown Ranch becoming a home for such kids, and publicizing their stories, but it never materialized.

== Death ==
At about 8 a.m. on October 30, 1985, Grant was killed in an automobile accident west of Titusville in Brevard County, Florida. Three vehicles were traveling east bound in single file, Grant was in the third vehicle. He pulled out of line (to the left) to pass both vehicles in front of him, when the middle vehicle also pulled out to pass at the same time. To avoid a collision, Grant suddenly swerved farther left, and went onto the shoulder of the oncoming lane, he then over-corrected back all the way to the right, when his vehicle left the roadway and spun into a ditch, which contained three feet of standing water. Grant was thrown out of his car and into the water. A passerby pulled him out, and he was taken to Jess Parrish Hospital in Titusville, but was dead on arrival. That morning, Grant was en route from his condominium in Winter Springs to the Kennedy Space Center to watch the (last successful) launch of the Space Shuttle Challenger at Cape Canaveral. He was to have been honored by the astronauts for encouraging aviation and space flight. He was 73 years old. Kirby is interred in Missoula, Montana.

== Recording career ==
Kirby Grant is listed as the recording artist on two Wizard Records singles, #245-A "Loving Time" and 245-B "Letter from Tina," circa 1970.

== Selected filmography ==
- Sweet Adeline (1934) – Singing Beer Garden Patron (uncredited)
- I Dream Too Much (1935) – Violinist (uncredited)
- In Old Chicago (1938) – Moustached Quartette Member – 'Old Virginny' Number (uncredited)
- Radio City Revels (1938) – Group Singer (uncredited)
- My Lucky Star (1938) – Singing Student on Sleighride (uncredited)
- There Goes My Heart (1938) – Customer (uncredited)
- Lawless Valley (1938) – Ranch Hand (uncredited)
- Red River Range (1938) – Tex Reilly
- Three Sons (1939) – Bert Pardway
- Mexican Spitfire (1940) – Airline Clerk (uncredited)
- The Marines Fly High (1940) – Lt. Bob Hobbes
- Millionaire Playboy (1940) – Bill (uncredited)
- Bullet Code (1940) – Bud Mathews
- Blondie Goes Latin (1941) – Hal Trent, Orchestra Leader
- Always Tomorrow: The Portrait of an American Business (1941) – 1st Picknicker (uncredited)
- The Power of God (1942) – Kenneth Hale
- Dr. Kildare's Victory (1942) – Sgt. Brown (uncredited)
- My Favorite Blonde (1942) – Pilot (uncredited)
- Hello, Frisco, Hello (1943) – Specialty Singer
- Bombardier (1943) – Pilot (uncredited)
- The Stranger from Pecos (1943) – Tom Barstow
- Destination Tokyo (1943) – Army Briefing Officer (uncredited)
- Chip Off the Old Block (1944) – Member – The Jivin' Jacks and Jills (uncredited)
- Hi, Good Lookin'! (1944) – King Castle
- Rosie the Riveter (1944) – Singer at Award Presentation (uncredited)
- Law Men (1944) – Clyde Miller
- Ghost Catchers (1944) – Clay Edwards
- In Society (1944) – Peter Evans
- Babes on Swing Street (1944) – Dick Lorimer
- I'll Remember April (1945) – Dave Ball
- Trail to Vengeance (1945) – Jeff Gordon
- Penthouse Rhythm (1945) – Dick Ryan
- Bad Men of the Border (1945) – Ted Cameron
- Easy to Look At (1945) – Tyler
- Code of the Lawless (1945) – Grant Carter posing as Chad Hilton
- Gun Town (1946) – Hal Wentley
- The Spider Woman Strikes Back (1946) – Hal Wentley
- Blonde Alibi (1946) – Henry Rothmore (uncredited)
- She Wrote the Book (1946) – Eddie Caldwell
- Lawless Breed (1946) – Ted Everett
- Rustler's Round-Up (1946) – Bob Ryan
- Gunman's Code (1946) – Jack Douglas
- Song of Idaho (1948) – King Russell
- Singin' Spurs (1948) – Jeff Carter
- Trail of the Yukon (1949) – Mountie Bob McDonald
- Black Midnight (1949) – Sheriff Gilbert
- The Wolf Hunters (1949) – Mountie Corporal Rod Webb
- Feudin' Rhythm (1949) – Ace Lucky
- Snow Dog (1950) – Mountie Corporal Rod McDonald
- Indian Territory (1950) – Lieutenant Randy Mason
- Dial 1119 (1950) – Reporter (uncredited)
- Call of the Klondike (1950) – Corporal Rod Webb
- Rhythm Inn (1951) – Dusty Rhodes
- Yukon Manhunt (1951) – Corporal Rod Webb
- Comin' Round the Mountain (1951) – Clark Winfield
- Northwest Territory (1951) – Cpl. Rod Webb
- Yukon Gold (1952) – Mountie Cpl. Rod Webb
- Fangs of the Arctic (1953) – Mountie Corporal Rod Webb
- Northern Patrol (1953) – Cpl. Rod Webb – RCMP
- Yukon Vengeance (1954) – Corporal Rod Webb, RCMP
