= William Sickner =

American cinematographer

William A. Sickner
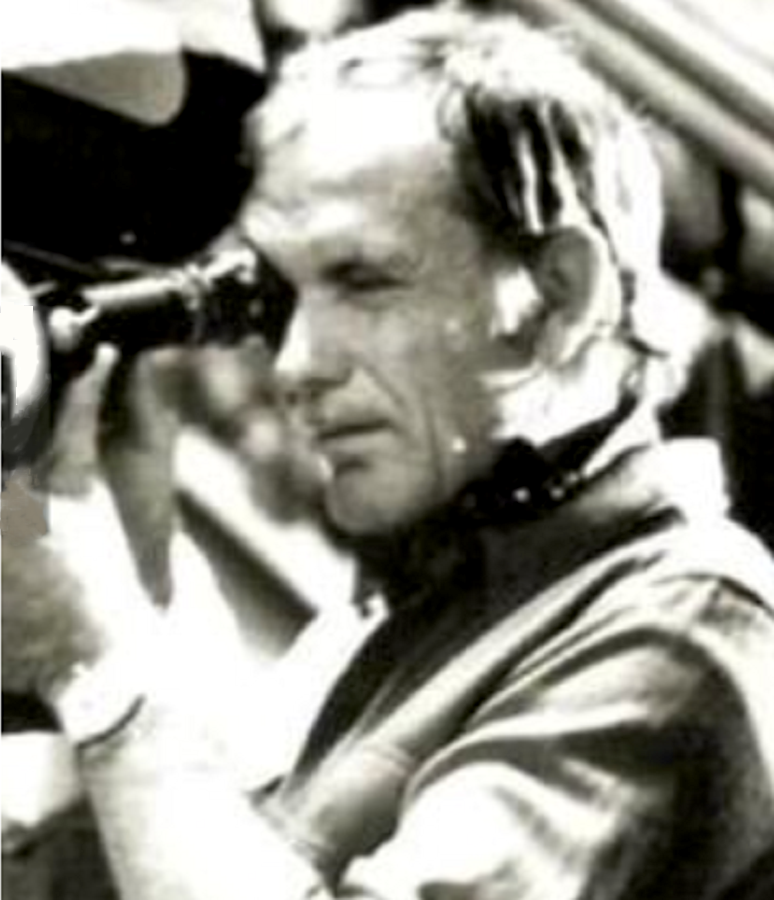
- Born: December 23, 1890; Rochester, New York, United States
- Died: September 18, 1967 (aged 76); Santa Monica, California, United States
- Occupation: Cinematographer
- Years active: 1928–1961 (film & TV)

William A. Sickner (December 23, 1890 – September 18, 1967) was an American cinematographer. He worked prolifically in film and later television. He worked for a number of studios, particularly Universal and Monogram Pictures.

== Selected filmography ==
- Stormy (1935)
- Rustlers of Red Dog (1935)
- Left-Handed Law (1937)
- Smoke Tree Range (1937)
- The Oregon Trail (1939)
- Black Diamonds (1940)
- Boss of Bullion City (1940)
- Hot Steel (1940)
- Winners of the West (1940)
- Riders of Death Valley (1941)
- Sea Raiders (1941)
- Gang Busters (1942)
- Frontier Badmen (1943)
- Keep 'Em Slugging (1943
- The Lone Star Trail (1943)
- Mystery of the River Boat (1944)
- The Great Alaskan Mystery (1944)
- Week-End Pass (1944)
- Trigger Trail (1944)
- Oklahoma Raiders (1944)
- The Mummy's Ghost (1944)
- Saddle Serenade (1945)
- Penthouse Rhythm (1945)
- The Lonesome Trail (1945)
- Riders of the Dawn (1945)
- Bowery Bombshell (1946)
- Don't Gamble with Strangers (1946)
- In Fast Company (1946)
- Live Wires (1946)
- Killer Dill (1947)
- King of the Bandits (1947)
- Robin Hood of Monterey (1947)
- Gas House Kids Go West (1947)
- Louisiana (1947)
- Joe Palooka in the Knockout (1947)
- Docks of New Orleans (1948)
- Kidnapped (1948)
- French Leave (1948)
- Tuna Clipper (1949)
- Trail of the Yukon (1949)
- The Wolf Hunters (1949)
- Hold That Baby! (1949)
- Killer Shark (1950)
- Call of the Klondike (1950)
- Snow Dog (1950)
- Square Dance Katy (1950)
- Father Makes Good (1950)
- Father Takes the Air (1951)
- Northwest Territory (1951)
- Yukon Manhunt (1951)
- Casa Manana (1951)
- The Lion Hunters (1951)
- Yellow Fin (1951)
- Desert Pursuit (1952)
- Torpedo Alley (1952)
- Northern Patrol (1953)
- Jack Slade (1953)
- Fangs of the Arctic (1953)
- Tangier Incident (1953)
- Mexican Manhunt (1953)
- The Return of Jack Slade (1955)
- Night Freight (1955)
- The Undead (1957)

== Bibliography ==
- Pitts, Michael R. Thrills Untapped: Neglected Horror, Science Fiction and Fantasy Films, 1928-1936. McFarland, 2018.
