= Call of the Klondike =

1950 film by Frank McDonald

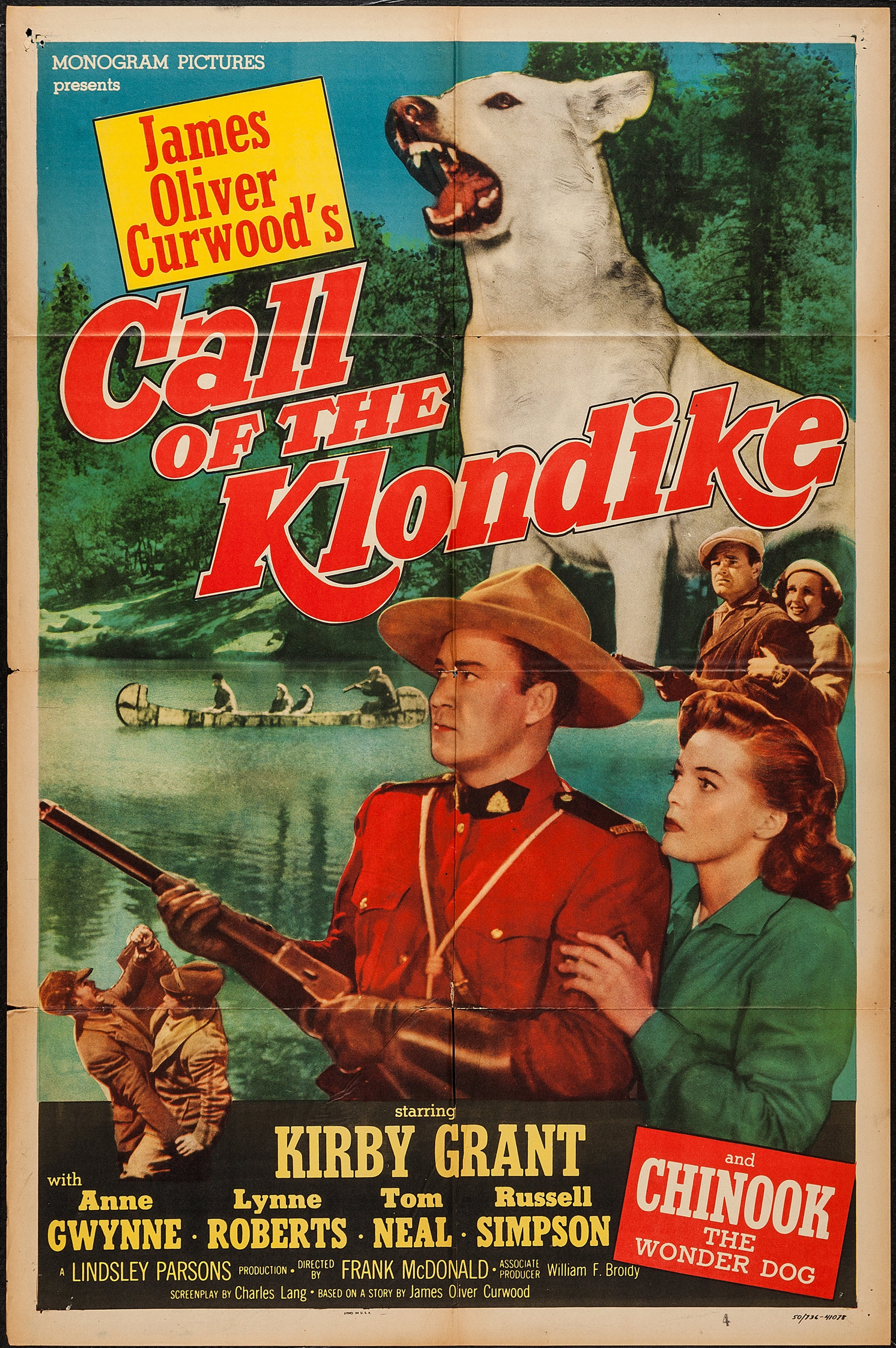
- Film poster
- Directed by: Frank McDonald
- Written by: James Oliver Curwood (novel); Charles Lang
- Produced by: William F. Broidy; Lindsley Parsons
- Starring: Kirby Grant; Anne Gwynne; Lynne Roberts; Tom Neal
- Cinematography: William A. Sickner
- Edited by: Ace Herman
- Music by: Edward J. Kay
- Production company: Monogram Pictures
- Distributed by: Monogram Pictures
- Release date: December 17, 1950
- Running time: 66 minutes
- Country: United States
- Language: English

Call of the Klondike is a 1950 American Northern film directed by Frank McDonald and starring Kirby Grant, Anne Gwynne and Lynne Roberts. The film is the fourth in the series of ten films featuring Kirby Grant as a Canadian Mountie.

== Plot ==
Corporal Rod Webb is assigned to investigate the disappearance of two men, and a woman named Nancy, who is seeking her father, accompanies him. With the help of his dog Chinook, Webb is able to solve the case.

== Cast ==
- Kirby Grant as Corporal Rod Webb
- Anne Gwynne as Nancy Craig
- Lynne Roberts as Emily Mallory
- Tom Neal as Tom Mallory
- Russell Simpson as Andy McKay
- Marc Krah as Mencheck
- Paul Bryar as Henchman Fred Foley
- Pat Gleason as Billy
- Duke York as Henchman Luke
- Roy Gordon as Major Robertson
- Chinook as Chinook, Webb's Dog

== Bibliography ==
- Drew, Bernard. Motion Picture Series and Sequels: A Reference Guide. Routledge, 2013.
