= Ace Herman =

American film producer

- Born: January 16, 1913; Springfield, Ohio, United States
- Died: December 22, 1971 (aged 58); Burbank, California; United States
- Other names: Leonard Herman; Leonard W. Herman
- Occupations: Editor; Producer
- Years active: 1936–1966

Leonard Wood Herman (1913–1971), known professionally as Ace Herman, was an American film editor and producer.

At the age of 18 he entered the theatrical business, managing movie-theater circuits in Iowa and Nebraska for five years. He then joined Universal Pictures, starting in the studio mail room. He advanced to casting, then projectionist, then the film library. There he went through the vaults for old action footage that could be inserted into the Universal serials. In 1943 he became a full-fledged editor for the serial unit.

Universal downsized its production departments, and in 1945 Ace Herman moved to Monogram Pictures where he worked mostly on series films (Charlie Chan mysteries, Freddie Stewart musicals, Roddy McDowall outdoor adventures, and Kirby Grant mounted police stories). He also served as associate producer on both the McDowall and the Grant films. Herman also worked on the TV series The Adventures of Wild Bill Hickok.

He left the studio in 1955 and worked as a freelance editor until 1966. He died in 1971.

== Selected filmography ==
- Jungle Queen (1945, serial)
- The Master Key (1945, serial)
- Moon Over Montana (1946)
- Ginger (1946)
- Louisiana (1947)
- French Leave (1948)
- Docks of New Orleans (1948)
- Trail of the Yukon (1949)
- Yellow Fin (1951)
- Northwest Territory (1951)
- Desert Pursuit (1952)
- Northern Patrol (1953)
- Tangier Incident (1953)
- Jack Slade (1953)
- Trail Blazers (1953)
- Yukon Vengeance (1954)
- New Faces (1954)
- Las Vegas Shakedown (1955)
- Toughest Man Alive (1955)

== Bibliography ==
- Pitts, Michael R. Western Film Series of the Sound Era. McFarland, 2009.
