= Joe Palooka, Champ =

1946 film by Reginald LeBorg

- Directed by: Reginald LeBorg
- Written by: Cy Endfield; Albert DePina; Hal E. Chester
- Produced by: Hal E. Chester
- Cinematography: Benjamin H. Kline
- Edited by: Bernard W. Burton
- Music by: Alexander Laszlo
- Distributed by: Monogram Pictures
- Release date: May 28, 1946
- Running time: 70 min.
- Country: United States
- Language: English

Joe Palooka, Champ is a 1946 American film featuring the comic-strip boxer Joe Palooka. This film from Monogram Pictures is the beginning of a series with eleven total entries:

- Gentleman Joe Palooka (1946)
- Joe Palooka in the Knockout (1947)
- Joe Palooka in Fighting Mad (1948)
- Joe Palooka in Winner Take All (1948)
- Joe Palooka in the Big Fight (1949)
- Joe Palooka in the Counterpunch (1949)
- Joe Palooka Meets Humphrey (1950)
- Joe Palooka in Humphrey Takes a Chance (1950)
- Joe Palooka in the Squared Circle (1950)
- Joe Palooka in Triple Cross (1951)

Leon Errol as Palooka's manager Knobby actually receives top billing in each of the first nine entries. James Gleason replaced Errol in the role for the last two films. Elyse Knox as girlfriend Ann Howe is replaced by various actresses in the role after the first eight films. Also debuting as series regulars in this film (seen in about half the series) were Sarah Padden and Michael Mark as Joe's Mom and Pop. Joe Kirkwood Jr. plays Joe Palooka in all eleven films.

== Cast ==
- Leon Errol as Knobby Walsh
- Joe Kirkwood, Jr. as Joe Palooka
- Elyse Knox as Anne Howe
- Eduardo Ciannelli as Florini
- Joe Sawyer as Lefty
- Elisha Cook, Jr. as Eugene
- Warren Hymer as Ira Eyler
- Robert Kent as Ronnie Brewster
- Sam McDaniel as Smoky
- Sarah Padden as Mom Palooka
- Joe Louis as Joe Louis
- Manuel Ortiz as Manuel Ortiz
- Michael Mark as Pop Palooka
- Dave Willock as Mr. Rodney
- Lou Nova as Al Costa
- Eddie Gribbon as Louie the Louisiana Lion
- J. Farrell MacDonald as Long-Count Bowman
- Philip Van Zandt as Freddie Wells
- Betty Blythe as Mrs. Stafford
- Carol Hughes as Mrs. Van Pragg
- Dewey Robinson as Police Captain
