= Eddie Gribbon =

American actor

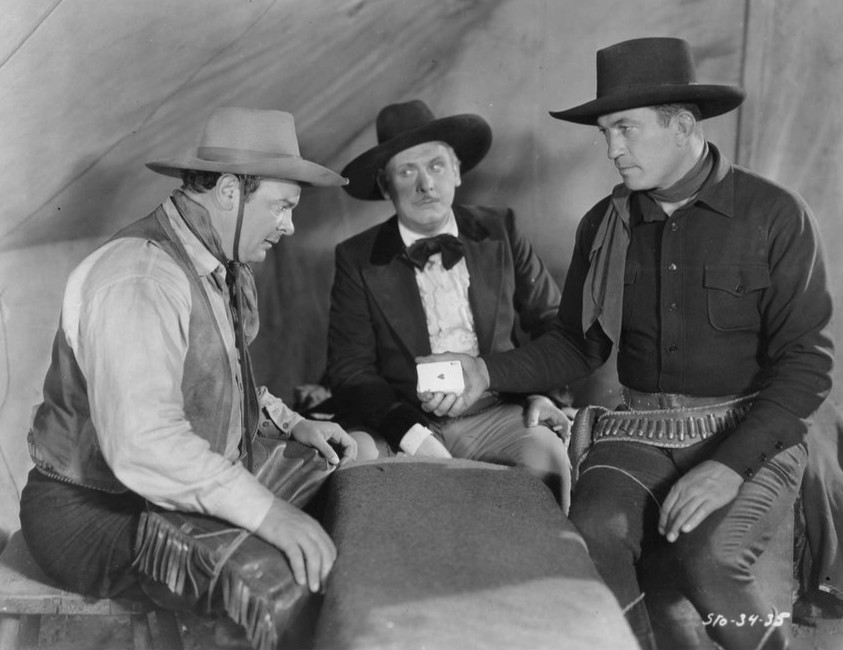
- Gribbon on the left with Victor McLaglen-right and Lew Cody-center in Not Exactly Gentlemen, 1931.
- Born: January 3, 1890; New York City, US
- Died: September 28, 1965 (aged 75); Hollywood, California, US
- Occupation: Actor
- Years active: 1916–1951
- Relatives: Harry Gribbon (brother)

Eddie Gribbon (January 3, 1890 – September 29, 1965) was an American film actor. He appeared in more than 180 films from the 1910s to the 1950s. Gribbon began working in Mack Sennett films in 1916 and continued through the 1920s. He usually had significant roles in two-reel films, but his roles in feature films were lesser ones.

Gribbon was the brother of actor Harry Gribbon.

== Selected filmography ==
- Salome vs. Shenandoah (1919) - Audience Spectator/ Soldier
- Down on the Farm (1920) (with Louise Fazenda and Harry Gribbon) - Banker's Henchman
- Love, Honor and Behave (1920) - The Lawyer's Left-Hand Man
- A Small Town Idol (1921) - Bandit Chief
- Home Talent (1921) - Stranded Actor
- Molly O' (1921) (with Mabel Normand) - Danny Smith
- Playing with Fire (1921) - Danny Smith
- The Crossroads of New York (1922) - Star Boarder
- Alias Julius Caesar (1922) - 'Nervy' Norton
- A Tailor-Made Man (1922) - Russell
- The Village Blacksmith (1922) - The Village Gossip
- Captain Fly-by-Night (1922) - Sgt. Cassara
- The Fourth Musketeer (1923) - Mike Donovan
- Crossed Wires (1923) - Tim Flanagan
- Double Dealing (1923) - Alonzo B. Keene
- The Victor (1923) - Porky Schaup, Boxer
- Hoodman Blind (1923) - Battling Brown
- After the Ball (1924) - A Crook
- Jack O'Clubs (1924) - Spike Kennedy
- The Border Legion (1924) - Blicky
- East of Broadway (1924) - Danny McCabe
- Code of the West (1925) - Tuck Merry
- Forty Winks (1925) - Tough guy (uncredited)
- The Mansion of Aching Hearts (1925) - Fritz Dahlgren
- Just a Woman (1925) - Oscar Dunn
- Seven Days (1925) - Burglar
- The Limited Mail (1925) - 'Spike' Nelson
- Under Western Skies (1926) - Reed
- The Bat (1926) - Detective Anderson
- Desert Gold (1926) - One-Found Kelley
- The Flaming Frontier (1926) - Jonesy
- Bachelor Brides (1926) - Glasgow Willie - aka Limehouse Herbert
- The Flying Mail (1926) - 'Gluefoot' Jones
- There You Are! (1926) - Eddie Gibbs
- Tell It to the Marines (1926) - Corporal Madden
- Man Bait (1927) - Red Welch
- Convoy (1927) - Eddie
- The Callahans and the Murphys (1927) - Jim Callahan
- Night Life (1927) - Nick
- Cheating Cheaters (1927) - Steve Wilson
- Streets of Shanghai (1927) - Swede
- Buck Privates (1928) - Sgt. Butts
- Nameless Men (1928) - Blackie
- Stop That Man! (1928) - Bill O'Brien
- Bachelor's Paradise (1928) - Terry Malone
- United States Smith (1928) - Sgt. Steve Riley
- Gang War (1928) - Blackjack
- Fancy Baggage (1929) - Steve
- From Headquarters (1929) - Pvt. Murphy
- Two Weeks Off (1929) - Sid Winters
- Two Men and a Maid (1929) - Adjutant
- Twin Beds (1929) - Red Trapp
- They Learned About Women (1930) - Brennan
- Dames Ahoy! (1930) - Mac Dougal
- Song of the West (1930) - Sergeant Major
- Born Reckless (1930) - Bugs
- Good Intentions (1930) - Liberty Red
- Not Exactly Gentlemen (1931) - Bronco Dawson
- Mr. Lemon of Orange (1931) - Walter (uncredited)
- Law and Order (1932) - Elder's Deputy (uncredited)
- Hidden Gold (1932) - Big Ben Cooper
- Arizona to Broadway (1933) - Max Rigby (uncredited)
- Search for Beauty (1934) - Adolph Knockler
- I Like It That Way (1934) - Joe
- I Can't Escape (1934) - Regan - Beat Cop
- The Cyclone Ranger (1935) - Duke
- Stone of Silver Creek (1935) - Masher (uncredited)
- Rio Rattler (1935) - Soapy
- She Couldn't Take It (1935) - Detective (uncredited)
- Rip Roaring Riley (1935) - Sparko - Henchman
- The Shadow of Silk Lennox (1935) - Lefty Sloan - Henchman
- Love on a Bet (1936) - Donovan - Escaped Convict
- The Millionaire Kid (1936) - Hogan
- The Phantom Rider (1936, Serial) - Sheriff Mark
- Bulldog Edition (1936) - Mr. Patrick McManus (uncredited)
- I Cover Chinatown (1936) - Truck Driver
- Too Many Wives (1937) - Owner of Oscar's Diner (uncredited)
- You Can't Buy Luck (1937) - Chuck (uncredited)
- There Goes My Girl (1937) - Mike - Whelan's Strong Arm Man (uncredited)
- San Quentin (1937) - Singing Convict 51310 (uncredited)
- The 13th Man (1937) - Iron Man
- Super-Sleuth (1937) - Policeman (uncredited)
- The Big Shot (1937) - Soapy - aka Mr. Stratford Enright III
- Big City (1937) - Slow-Witted Policeman (uncredited)
- Live, Love and Learn (1937) - Turkish Bath Attendant (uncredited)
- Mannequin (1937) - Detective (uncredited)
- Wise Girl (1937) - Fight Referee (uncredited)
- The Spy Ring (1938) - Sergeant Who Threatens Mayhew (uncredited)
- Maid's Night Out (1938) - Tim Hogan
- On the Great White Trail (1938) - Constable Patsy
- Little Orphan Annie (1938) - Monk
- Idiot's Delight (1939) - Cop (uncredited)
- Fast and Furious (1939) - Hennessy - a Policeman (uncredited)
- Another Thin Man (1939) - Baggage Man (uncredited)
- Edison, the Man (1940) - Cashier (uncredited)
- Gold Rush Maisie (1940) - Gus - Customer (uncredited)
- The Leather Pushers (1940) - Pete Manson
- The Great Dictator (1940) - Tomanian Storm Trooper
- Li'l Abner (1940) - Barney Bargrease
- Mr. District Attorney (1941) - Detective in Café (uncredited)
- Pot o' Gold (1941) - Expressman (uncredited)
- Honky Tonk (1941) - Pallbearer (scenes deleted)
- The Secret Code (1942, Serial) - First Mate (uncredited)
- Sleepy Lagoon (1943) - A Lug (uncredited)
- Blazing Guns (1943) - Cactus Joe
- Mr. Muggs Steps Out (1943) - Butch Grogan
- Canyon City (1943) - Deputy Frank
- Busy Buddies (1944, Short) - The Champ (uncredited)
- Joe Palooka, Champ (1946) - Louie, the Louisiana Lion
- Gentleman Joe Palooka (1946) - Ziggy - Sparring Partner
- Mr. Hex (1946) - Blackie, a Henchman
- Joe Palooka in the Knockout (1947) - Canvasback
- Joe Palooka in Fighting Mad (1948) - Scranton
- Smart Woman (1948) - Man in Bar (uncredited)
- Joe Palooka in Winner Take All (1948) - Canvasback
- Smugglers' Cove (1948) - Digger, the Caretaker
- Street Corner (1948) - Mike - Taxi Driver (uncredited)
- Joe Palooka in the Big Fight (1949) - Canvasback
- Fighting Fools (1949) - Highball (uncredited)
- The Beautiful Blonde from Bashful Bend (1949) - Hoodlum (uncredited)
- Joe Palooka in the Counterpunch (1949) - Canvasback
- Joe Palooka Meets Humphrey (1950) - Canvasback
- Joe Palooka in Humphrey Takes a Chance (1950) - Canvasback
- Triple Trouble (1950) - Hobo Barton
- Joe Palooka in the Squared Circle (1950) - Canvasback
- Father's Wild Game (1950) - Delivery Man (uncredited)
- Joe Palooka in Triple Cross (1951) - Canvasback
