= Hal Baylor =

American boxer and actor (1918–98)

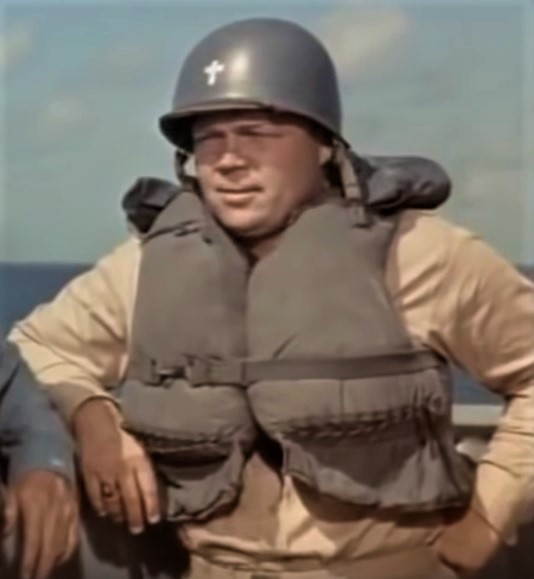
- Baylor in 1956
- Born: Hal David Britton; December 10, 1918; San Antonio, Texas, U.S.
- Died: January 15, 1998 (aged 79); Van Nuys, Los Angeles, California, U.S.
- Other name: Hal Fieberling
- Education: Washington State College (attended); Chico State College (attended)
- Occupations: Boxer, actor
- Years active: 1940–1947 (boxer); 1948–1978 (actor)
- Spouses: Jacqueline Anstey (m. 1940; div. 1942); Margaret MacClean (m. 1943; div. 1964); Shirley Hickey (m.1965)
- Children: 2

Hal Harvey Fieberling (born Hal David Britton; December 10, 1918 – January 15, 1998) known by his stage name Hal Baylor, was an American boxer and screen character actor. He had a professional boxing record of 16–8–3, and later appeared in 76 films and over 500 episodes of various television shows.

== Early years ==
Born in San Antonio, Texas, to David Locke Britton and Thelma Hallie Bowles, he grew up in Oakland, California when his mother remarried to Walter H. Fieberling during January 1925. After Oakland High School, he attended Chico State College where he played on the football team. He transferred to Washington State College in the Fall of 1938, where he pledged Phi Delta Theta. But by December 1939 he was working as an apprentice butcher in a meat market on 14th Street in Oakland.

== Boxing ==
Fieberling had his first amateur fight in San Francisco, during June 1938, while still a college student. Representing the Athens Athletic Club of Oakland, he won the California Amateur Athletic Union (AAU) novice heavyweight title in a single bout on points. A newspaper report on his first boxing match mentioned he was left-handed. He repeated the triumph in August 1939, this time taking the State AAU heavyweight title by knocking out 6' 6" 225 lb. Jack Hillman of the San Francisco Olympic Club. However, the following month he lost a rematch on points to Hillman, his first amateur defeat.

After just five amateur fights, Fieberling signed a professional contract with manager Ray Carlen in May 1940. He scored a technical knockout over Phil Latonia in the third round for his first professional win, and three weeks later did the same to Bob Schaunbelt. Sportswriters labeled him "the butcher boy" and printed photos of him at his daytime job. Columnists also called him "Handsome Hal" and "Prince Hal" for his good looks.

Over the years, reports of his height varied from 6' 2" (188 cm) to 6' 4 1/2" (194 cm). All his matches were as a heavyweight, with his weight varying from a pre-boxing high of 227 lbs. (103 kg), to a low of 189 lbs. (85.7 kg) after his return from the Pacific War. Following the war, he resumed professional boxing, until he fractured his hand in a 1947 fight with Dutch Culbertson. His career record was 52–5 as an amateur (Note: Wins and losses; there are no draws in amateur boxing.) and 16–8–3 as a professional. Sports columnist Eddie Muller said years after Fieberling left the ring that "he didn't amount to much because he never took the game too seriously".

== Military service ==
Fieberling was a private at a US Marine Corps recruit depot during January 1943, making the rank of sergeant by November 1943. He was assigned stateside through April 1944, enabling him to continue boxing. He took part in the landings on Saipan and Tinian, finishing the war as a Staff Sergeant with the 18th Anti-Aircraft Artillery Battalion.

== Early films ==
Fieberling began his acting career in the 1948 boxing film Joe Palooka in Winner Take All. The film's star, Joe Kirkwood, had spotted him at a boxing arena. During filming of a boxing scene, Kirkwood threw the wrong choreographed punch and Fieberling accidentally kayoed him. Fieberling was an official witness a year later when Kirkwood took his final exam for U.S. naturalization.

The Set-Up (1949) was Fieberling's third film and first credited role. The picture included the entirety of a four-round bout between star Robert Ryan, portraying a second-rate pug on the skids, and Fieberling, playing a mob-controlled fighter. Reviewers praised the realism of the boxing and the lack of cliches. Ryan told a columnist that shooting the bout with Fieberling took 10 days to capture 11 minutes of filming. "Each afternoon I went home with a headache. Fieberling hits hard. Once Hal knocked me cold for several seconds. He gave me a black eye, mussed up my nose, and made me glad I didn't follow boxing as a profession." Fieberling said of Ryan: "There's one actor who can go more than two rounds in the Mocambo." (Note: The Mocambo at the time had a reputation for brawls breaking out among its celebrity patrons. See "Cugat and Oleg Cassini Fight At Mocambo", The San Bernardino County Sun, February 9, 1948, page 1, for an example.)

Fieberling received more publicity nationwide from The Set-Up than he ever had from his boxing career, which had been confined to California. He had three more films released during 1949, one of which, Sands of Iwo Jima, was considered his most remembered film role.

== Films and television ==
In March 1950, Fieberling made his earliest known television appearance, when he and his then wife along with three other couples guested on The Frank Webb Show, a local program on KFI-TV Channel 9 in Los Angeles. Later that year he performed on two episodes of The Lone Ranger. Television would prove very lucrative, but it also diminished his standing with neighbor kids, one of who told him: "You're not so tough. I saw the Lone Ranger beat the stuffing out of you".

By 1952 he decided to adopt the stage name "Hal Baylor" as he felt it was "easier to spell and pronounce than Fieberling". The choice was meant to honor his great-great-grandfather, Robert E. B. Baylor, the founder of Baylor University.

Oakland sportswriter Alan Ward said of Baylor in late 1957: "He works constantly and remuneratively in movies and television... He has the face and structure of a college football hero but Hollywood usually casts him as a villain. A baby-faced villain. And invariably in westerns." Thirteen years later, he echoed the same thoughts on Baylor in another column: "Readers have seen Hal Baylor, nee Fieberling, on movie and TV screens scores of times. Usually he's the villain, rarely a hero". Baylor agreed with the assessment of his career: "Recently I had a sympathetic part and got to kiss the girl. It was quite a departure from the norm. As a rule I'm the complete heel".

From 1961, he made television commercials for Kellogg's OK's breakfast cereal as Big Otis the Scotsman until he was replaced by Yogi Bear.

Baylor's last film performances came in 1975, with three movies released that year: A Boy and His Dog, Cornbread, Earl and Me, and Hustle. His last television work was an episode of CHiPs broadcast during 1978.

"Like Elam and Van Cleef, Hal is a very pleasant fellow off screen. He has the quiet gentle manner of a man who doesn't have to prove anything to anyone. He bears no marks from his prize-fighting career, or his countless on-camera brawls. "You name the actor" he said resignedly, "he's beaten me up". John Wayne, John Payne, Robert Ryan, Robert Mitchum are naturally on the list. And Tab Hunter. "He gave me a sound thrashing," Hal said deadpan." —Interview in Anaheim Bulletin

== Later life ==
Baylor was the founder and longtime president of a charitable organization called The Spotlighters, (Note: Later known as The Starlighters and by other names.) consisting of show business personalities who raised money for the San Fernando Valley Youth Center. He also took part in celebrity golf tournaments benefiting charities.

Baylor was a partner in an exclusive outdoor sports development near Jackson Hole, Wyoming and told sportswriter Alan Ward: "Someday I'll retire there and hunt and fish and watch the late, late movies." In 1983, Baylor donated scripts and photos from his career to the American Heritage Center of the University of Wyoming.

Baylor died in Los Angeles on January 15, 1998.

== Personal life ==
Fieberling married Jacqueline Anstey, whom he had known at Oakland High School, on February 3, 1940, in Reno, Nevada. They had a son Michael, born in late 1941, before separating on May 15, 1942. She filed for divorce and was granted preliminary alimony and child support on May 27, 1942.

While a sergeant in the USMC, stationed in San Diego, Fieberling married Margaret Jeanne MacLean in Los Angeles, on November 27, 1943. They had a daughter Paula in August 1955.

Hal Baylor and Shirley Hickey (née Croose), were married on August 14, 1965.

== Filmography ==
=== As Hal Fieberling ===
Film (by year of first release)
Year	Title	Role	Notes & Cites
1948	Joe Palooka in Winner Take All	Sammy Talbot	Uncredited.
1948	In This Corner		Uncredited.
1949	The Set-Up	Tiger Nelson	The screenplay was by Art Cohn, a former Oakland sportswriter, who had covered Fieberling's early boxing career.
1949	The Crooked Way	Coke	
1949	Yes Sir, That's My Baby	Pudge Flugeldorfer	Fieberling is a married football-playing G.I. Bill student at a small college.
1949	Sands of Iwo Jima	Pvt. 'Sky' Choynski	
1950	Destination Big House	Bill Storm	Uncredited
1950	Dial 1119 (Note: The working title was The Violent Hour.)	Lt. 'Whitey' Tallman	
1950	Joe Palooka in the Squared Circle	Pinky Thompson	
1950	For Heaven's Sake	Expectant Father	Uncredited
1951	Inside Straight	Foreman	Uncredited
1951	Up Front	Smitty	Uncredited
1951	The Guy Who Came Back	Navy Man	Uncredited
1951	Jim Thorpe – All-American	Player	Uncredited

=== As Hal Baylor ===
Film (by year of first release)
Year	Title	Role	Notes & Cites
1951	The Wild Blue Yonder	Sgt. Eric Nelson	
1952	Fort Osage	Olaf Christensen	Uncredited
1952	Down Among the Sheltering Palms	Soldier	Uncredited
1952	Breakdown	Joe Thompson	Plays champ
1952	Big Jim McLain	Poke	
1952	One Minute to Zero	Pvt. Jones	
1953	The Sun Shines Bright	Rufe Ramseur Jr.	
1953	Woman They Almost Lynched	Zed	Uncredited
1953	Champ for a Day	'Soldier' Freeman	
1953	99 River Street	Sailor Braxton	Uncredited
1953	Island in the Sky	Stankowski	
1953	Hot News	Augie Grotz	
1953	Flight Nurse	Sgt. Jimmy Case	
1954	Prince Valiant	Prison Guard	Uncredited
1954	River of No Return	Young Punk	Uncredited.
1954	Tobor the Great	Max	
1954	This Is My Love	Eddie Collins	
1954	Black Tuesday	Lou Mehrtens	
1955	Outlaw Treasure	Ace Harkey	
1956	Away All Boats	Chaplain Hughes	Sports columnist Alan Ward expressed surprise at Baylor playing a Navy chaplain.
1956	The Burning Hills	Braun	Baylor plays a hired gunfighter.
1957	Kiss Them for Me	Big Marine in Nightclub	Uncredited
1958	The Young Lions	Pvt. Burnecker	
1959	Operation Petticoat	Military Police Sergeant	Uncredited
1963	Johnny Cool	Gambler	Uncredited
1964	Quick, Before It Melts	Prison Guard	
1967	The Gnome-Mobile	Male Nurse	Uncredited
1967	Fitzwilly	Motorcycle Cop	Uncredited
1969	Ride a Northbound Horse	Gang Member	
1970	The Cheyenne Social Club	Barkeep at Lady of Egypt	
1970	WUSA	Shorty	
1971	The Barefoot Executive	Policeman	
1971	The Grissom Gang	Chief McLaine	
1971	Evel Knievel	Sheriff	
1972	Pickup on 101	Railroad cop	
1972	Ulzana's Raid	Curtis	Uncredited
1973	Emperor of the North	Yardman's Helper	
1973	One Little Indian	Branigan	
1974	Herbie Rides Again	Demolition Truck Driver	
1974	The Bears and I	Foreman	
1975	A Boy and His Dog	Michael	Baylor played a killer android in this post-apocalyptic cult favorite.
1975	Cornbread, Earl and Me	Mr. Wilson	
1975	Hustle	Police Captain	

== Partial television credits ==
- The Lone Ranger (1950–1954) – Judd Collins / Notch Brice / Bert Devlin / Glenn Bolton / Gus
- Mr. & Mrs. North (1953) – Vince McKay in "Trained for Murder"
- Four Star Playhouse (1954–1955) – Cal / Jamison
- The Life and Legend of Wyatt Earp (1955–J1958) – Sam Wilson / Bill Thompson / Jeb Callum
- Cheyenne (1956–1960) – Rowdy Shane / Jed Rayner / Joe Barnum / Duke / Turk Moylan
- Gunsmoke (1957) – Mike
- The Silent Service (1957–1958) – Exec. Officer Bob Ison / Calhoun / Lieut. Robert L. Ison
- The Donna Reed Show (1959) – Herbie, "Donna Plays Cupid"
- Have Gun – Will Travel (1958–1963) – Tagg – Farmer / Floyd Perrin / Bryan Sykes
- Death Valley Days (1958–1970) – Stokes LaFever / Captain Randolph / Wes Adams / Web Hardy / Trenner / Lance / Sheriff Ryan / Hughie Snow / Joe Sweigert / Ben Poole / Gus Mahoney / Jed / Buck Jarrico
- 26 Men (1958–1959) – Slats Scarsted / Roper / Charlie Daggett / Sykes
- Laramie (1959–1963) – Hub Ballard / Samson / Ben – Mountain Man / Beamer / 2nd Bar Patron / Kincaid / Cowboy Hill
- Rawhide (1959–1965)
  - Rawhide (1959) – Blacksmith in S2:E1, "Incident of the Day of the Dead"
  - Rawhide (1960) – Myles in S2:E25, "Incident of the Arana Sacar"
  - Rawhide (1961) – Pool Player in S4:E7, "The Black Sheep"
  - Rawhide (1962) – Jenkins in S5:E1, "Incident of El Toro"
  - Rawhide (1962) – Jenkins in S5:E2, "Incident of the Hunter"
  - Rawhide (1962) – Jenkins in S5:E12, "Incident of the Querencias"
  - Rawhide (1965) – Barney in S7:E22, "Prairie Fire"
  - Rawhide (1965) – Will Gufler in S8:E6, "Hostage for Hanging"
- Lawman (1959–1962) – Harlan Smith/ Poke / Mort Peters
- Maverick (1959) – Bimbo
- Bat Masterson (1960) – Eli Fisher
- 77 Sunset Strip (1960–1964) – Herky's Bouncer / Johnny Lace / Vic Felton / Hank Schmidt / Britt
- Stagecoach West (1961) – Saloon Brawler / Jim Horton / Big Jim
- Tales of Wells Fargo (1962) – Hondo
- The Real McCoys (1963) Goober Watson
- Perry Mason (1963–1965) – Jack David / First Truck Driver / Proprietor
- Wagon Train (1963) S6 E34 "Alias Bill Hawks" as Lester Cole
- The Virginian (1963–1970) – Jethro / Bert / Corporal Jobie / 1st Miner / Sgt. Costello / Gleason / Flake
- The Addams Family (1964) – Fred in episode "Morticia the Matchmaker"
- My Favorite Martian (1964–1966) – Red / Guard / Harold
- Slattery's People (1965) – Tom Short in "A Sitting Duck Named Slattery"
- Laredo (1966) – Mott / Tattoo
- A Man Called Shenandoah (1966) – as Driscoll in "The Siege"
- The Road West (1966) – as Wesley in "Long Journey to Leavenworth"
- The Big Valley (1967) – Sam Driscoll / Gabe
- Batman (1967) – Mercury
- Dragnet (1967) – Roger Kensington in "The Shooting"
- Star Trek (1967–1968) – Guard / Policeman in "The City on the Edge of Forever"
- Love American Style (1969) – Man at Bar in "Love and the Modern Wife"
- The Virginian (1970) (The Men of Shiloh) – Season 9 Episode 01 (The West vs. Colonel MacKenzie) :Jethro
- Kodiak (1974) in "Lesson in Terror".
- Planet of the Apes (1974) as Jasko in "The Deception"
- Barbary Coast (1975) as Paddy Muldoon in "Arson and Old Lace"
- How the West Was Won (1976) as Lawman in "The Macahans"
- CHiPs (1978) as Reed in "Trick or Treat"
