= Michael Mark (actor) =

Russian-American actor (1886–1975)

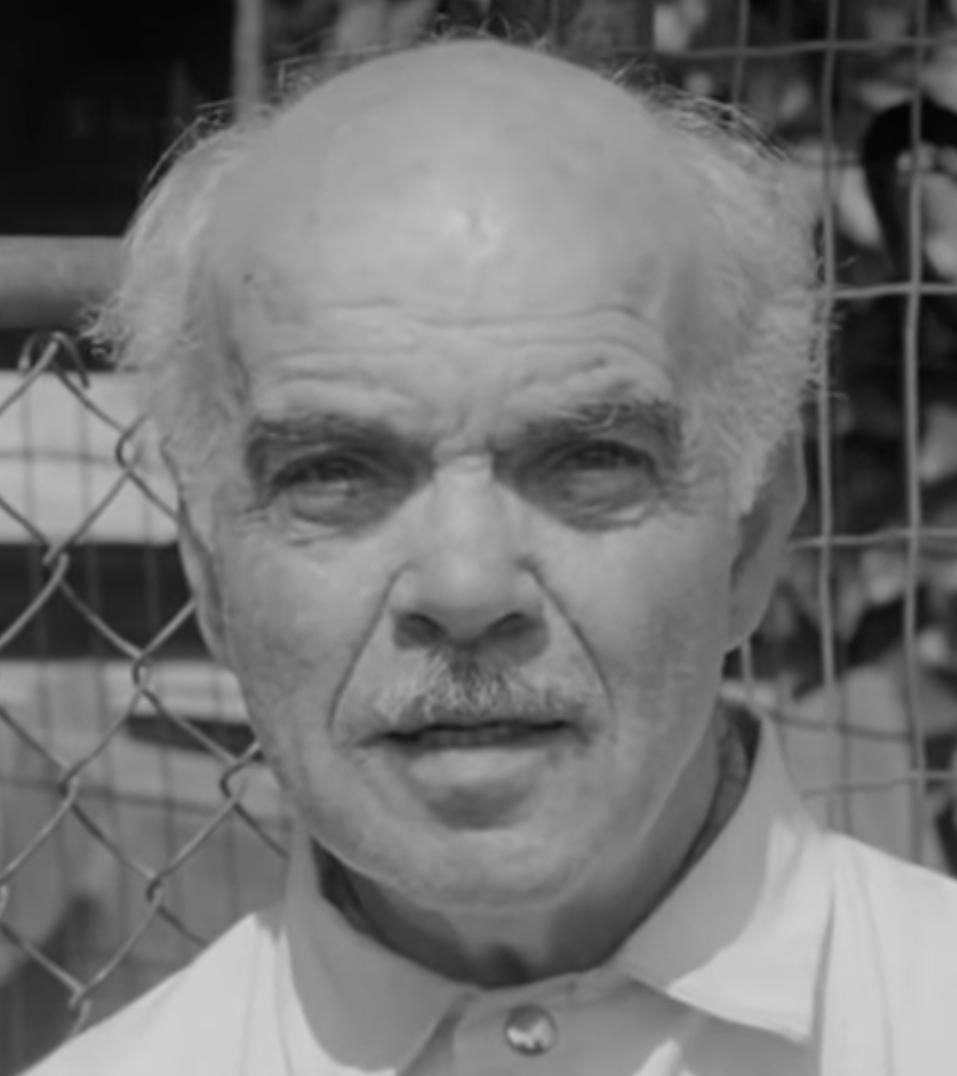
- Mark in The Wasp Woman (1959)
- Born: Morris Schulman; 15 March 1886; Mogilev, Russian Empire
- Died: 3 February 1975 (aged 88); Los Angeles, California, U.S.
- Occupation: Actor
- Years active: 1928–1969

Michael Mark (born Morris Schulman; 15 March 1886 – 3 February 1975) was a Russian-born American film actor. He appeared in more than 120 films between 1928 and 1969.

== Biography ==
Born in 1886 in Mogilev, Russian Empire (now Belarus), he immigrated the United States in 1910. During the 1930s and 1940s, he was used by Universal Studios in minor roles for several Frankenstein movies, although he played different parts in each of them.

He may perhaps best-remembered, if not by name, as the desperate father of the killed girl in Frankenstein (1931) with Boris Karloff. Michael Mark died in Los Angeles, California, aged 88, in 1975.

== Selected filmography ==
- Four Sons (1928) - Von Stomm's Orderly (uncredited)
- Tempest (1928) - Minor Role (uncredited)
- The Woman Disputed (1928) - Russian Soldier (uncredited)
- Napoleon's Barber (1928, Short) - Peasant
- City Girl (1930) - Man Standing at Cafe (uncredited)
- Remote Control (1930) - Thug (uncredited)
- Resurrection (1931) - Simon Kartinkin, innkeeper
- The Yellow Ticket (1931) - Baron's Secretary (uncredited)
- The Guardsman (1931) - The Actor's Valet (uncredited)
- Ambassador Bill (1931) - Republican Revolutionary Sniper (uncredited)
- Frankenstein (1931) - Ludwig (uncredited)
- The World and the Flesh (1932) - Revolutionary (uncredited)
- Roar of the Dragon (1932) - Wounded Informant (uncredited)
- Six Hours to Live (1932) - Townsman in Window (uncredited)
- Rasputin and the Empress (1932) - Revolutionary Soldier (uncredited)
- Laughter in Hell (1933) - Convict (uncredited)
- Tonight Is Ours (1933) - Member of People's Delegation (uncredited)
- She Done Him Wrong (1933) - Janitor (uncredited)
- Luxury Liner (1933) - Ship Passenger (uncredited)
- The Kiss Before the Mirror (1933) - Courtroom Spectator (uncredited)
- Notorious but Nice (1933) - Henchman Bill
- Night Flight (1933) - Airport Office Employee (uncredited)
- The Way to Love (1933) - Window Washer (uncredited)
- Cradle Song (1933) - Toymaker (uncredited)
- Roman Scandals (1933) - Assistant Cook (uncredited)
- I Am Suzanne! (1933) - Puppeteer (uncredited)
- Wharf Angel (1934) - Saloon Master of Ceremonies (uncredited)
- The Black Cat (1934) - Cultist Binding Joan (uncredited)
- Stamboul Quest (1934) - Headwaiter (uncredited)
- One Night of Love (1934) - Flower Store Man (uncredited)
- British Agent (1934) - Soviet Committeeman (uncredited)
- Marie Galante (1934) - Babu (uncredited)
- The Night Is Young (1935) - Messenger from Restaurant (uncredited)
- All the King's Horses (1935) - Clerk (uncredited)
- Black Fury (1935) - Miner (uncredited)
- Paris in Spring (1935) - Bartender (uncredited)
- The Glass Key (1935) - Swartz - Hood (uncredited)
- Mad Love (1935) - Execution Official (uncredited)
- The Black Room (1935) - Peasant (uncredited)
- Woman Wanted (1935) - Smiley's Henchman (uncredited)
- The Last Days of Pompeii (1935) - Pompeii Nobleman (uncredited)
- Crime and Punishment (1935) - Painter / prisoner (uncredited)
- The Dark Hour (1936) - Arthur Bell
- The King Steps Out (1936) - Waiter (uncredited)
- Sons o' Guns (1936) - Carl
- Ticket to Paradise (1936) - Vagrant (uncredited)
- Anthony Adverse (1936) - Stage-Door Man (uncredited)
- The Garden of Allah (1936) - Coachman (uncredited)
- That Girl from Paris (1936) - Drunk Fortune-Teller (uncredited)
- The King and the Chorus Girl (1937) - Stage Doorman (uncredited)
- Confession (1937) - Russian Interpreter (uncredited)
- Missing Witnesses (1937) - Hartman
- Prescription for Romance (1937) - Cab Driver (uncredited)
- Swiss Miss (1938) - Astonished Swiss Villager (uncredited)
- Ride a Crooked Mile (1938) - Foma (uncredited)
- Son of Frankenstein (1939) - Ewald Neumüller
- Paris Honeymoon (1939) - Julieska Partisan (uncredited)
- Society Smugglers (1939) - Rug Merchant
- Lady of the Tropics (1939) - Mr. Robert (uncredited)
- Tower of London (1939) - Henry VI's Servant (uncredited)
- Charlie Chan in City in Darkness (1939) - Mechanic (uncredited)
- Balalaika (1939) - (uncredited)
- The House of the Seven Gables (1940) - Ex-Convict Reading Tribune (uncredited)
- Ma! He's Making Eyes at Me (1940) - Small Thief (uncredited)
- Flash Gordon Conquers the Universe (1940, Serial) - Professor Karm [Chs. 5-10]
- The Mummy's Hand (1940) - Bazaar Owner
- City for Conquest (1940) - Tonbstone Painter (uncredited)
- Arise, My Love (1940) - Joe - Botzelberg's Asst. (uncredited)
- The Son of Monte Cristo (1940) - Archbishop
- Comrade X (1940) - Goronoff - the Bellhop (uncredited)
- Mr. Celebrity (1941) - Gas Station Attendant
- The Ghost of Frankenstein (1942) - Councillor (uncredited)
- Men of San Quentin (1942) - Mike, Convict in Ravine
- Road to Morocco (1942) - Pottery Vendor (uncredited)
- Casablanca (1942) - Vendor (uncredited)
- Sherlock Holmes and the Secret Weapon (1942) - George (uncredited)
- Mission to Moscow (1943) - Timid Man (uncredited)
- Hitler's Madman (1943) - Czech Laborer in Pain (uncredited)
- Background to Danger (1943) - Hotel Night Clerk (uncredited)
- None Shall Escape (1944) - Old Man (uncredited)
- The Bridge of San Luis Rey (1944) - Traveler to Lima (uncredited)
- House of Frankenstein (1944) - Frederick Strauss
- The Great Flamarion (1945) - Nightwatchman
- Crime, Inc. (1945) - Lutz, Cafe Waiter (uncredited)
- Back to Bataan (1945) - Señor O'Bordo (uncredited)
- Jealousy (1945) - Shop Owner
- Cornered (1945) - Elevator Operator (uncredited)
- The Fighting Guardsman (1946) - Poor Farmer (uncredited)
- Joe Palooka, Champ (1946) - Herman (Pop) Palooka
- Gentleman Joe Palooka (1946) - Pop Palooka (uncredited)
- Northwest Outpost (1947) - Small Convict (uncredited)
- The Trespasser (1947) - Collector (uncredited)
- The Pretender (1947) - Mike - Janitor
- Joe Palooka in the Knockout (1947) - Pop Palooka (uncredited)
- The Exile (1947) - Drunk (uncredited)
- Joe Palooka in Fighting Mad (1948) - Pop Palooka
- Devil's Cargo (1948) - Salvation Army Captain
- Letter from an Unknown Woman (1948) - Café Customer (uncredited)
- The Vicious Circle (1948) - Gustav Horney
- Appointment with Murder (1948) - 2nd Baggage Clerk
- Search for Danger (1949) - Mr. Perry
- Follow Me Quietly (1949) - Mr. Mark, Apartment Manager (uncredited)
- This Side of the Law (1950) - Vagrant (uncredited)
- Once a Thief (1950) - Milton
- Mask of the Avenger (1951) - Townsman (uncredited)
- The People Against O'Hara (1951) - Workman (uncredited)
- Quo Vadis (1951) - Fisherman (uncredited)
- Chained for Life (1952) - Man in Audience (uncredited)
- Mutiny (1952) - Cuban Fisherman (uncredited)
- Desert Passage (1952) - Pop Burley
- The Miracle of Our Lady of Fatima (1952) - Monsignor Formigão (uncredited)
- The Merry Widow (1952) - Chestnut Vendor (uncredited)
- Salome (1953) - Old Farmer (uncredited)
- The Juggler (1953) - Old Man Showing Photo of His Son (uncredited)
- Phantom from Space (1953) - Watchman
- The Silver Chalice (1954) - Audience Member (uncredited)
- The Big Combo (1955) - Fred - Hotel Clerk
- Son of Sinbad (1955) - Caravan Merchant (uncredited)
- Rock Around the Clock (1956) - Mr. Gilflavin - Chaperone (uncredited)
- Edge of Hell (1956)
- The Ten Commandments (1956) - Hebrew at Dathan's Tent / Old Man Who Blesses Moses (uncredited)
- Death of a Scoundrel (1956) - Mike - Elevator Operator (uncredited)
- Rumble on the Docks (1956) - Dormeyer (uncredited)
- Lizzie (1957) - Bartender (uncredited)
- Silk Stockings (1957) - Mr. Volotoff (uncredited)
- Jet Pilot (1957) - Russian General (uncredited)
- The Book of Acts Series (1957) - Member of the Sanhedrin
- The Brothers Karamazov (1958) - Juror (uncredited)
- Too Much, Too Soon (1958) - Patterson (uncredited)
- Attack of the Puppet People (1958) - Emil
- City of Fear (1959) - Restaurant Proprietor (uncredited)
- The Wasp Woman (1959) - Eric Zinthrop
- Return of the Fly (1959) - Gaston (watchman)
- The Big Fisherman (1959) - Innkeeper
- A Guide for the Married Man (1967) - Shoeshine Man (uncredited)
- Funny Girl (1968) - Halvah Peddler (uncredited)
- Hello, Dolly! (1969) Pushcart Man (uncredited)
