= Joe Palooka in the Big Fight =

1949 film by Cy Endfield

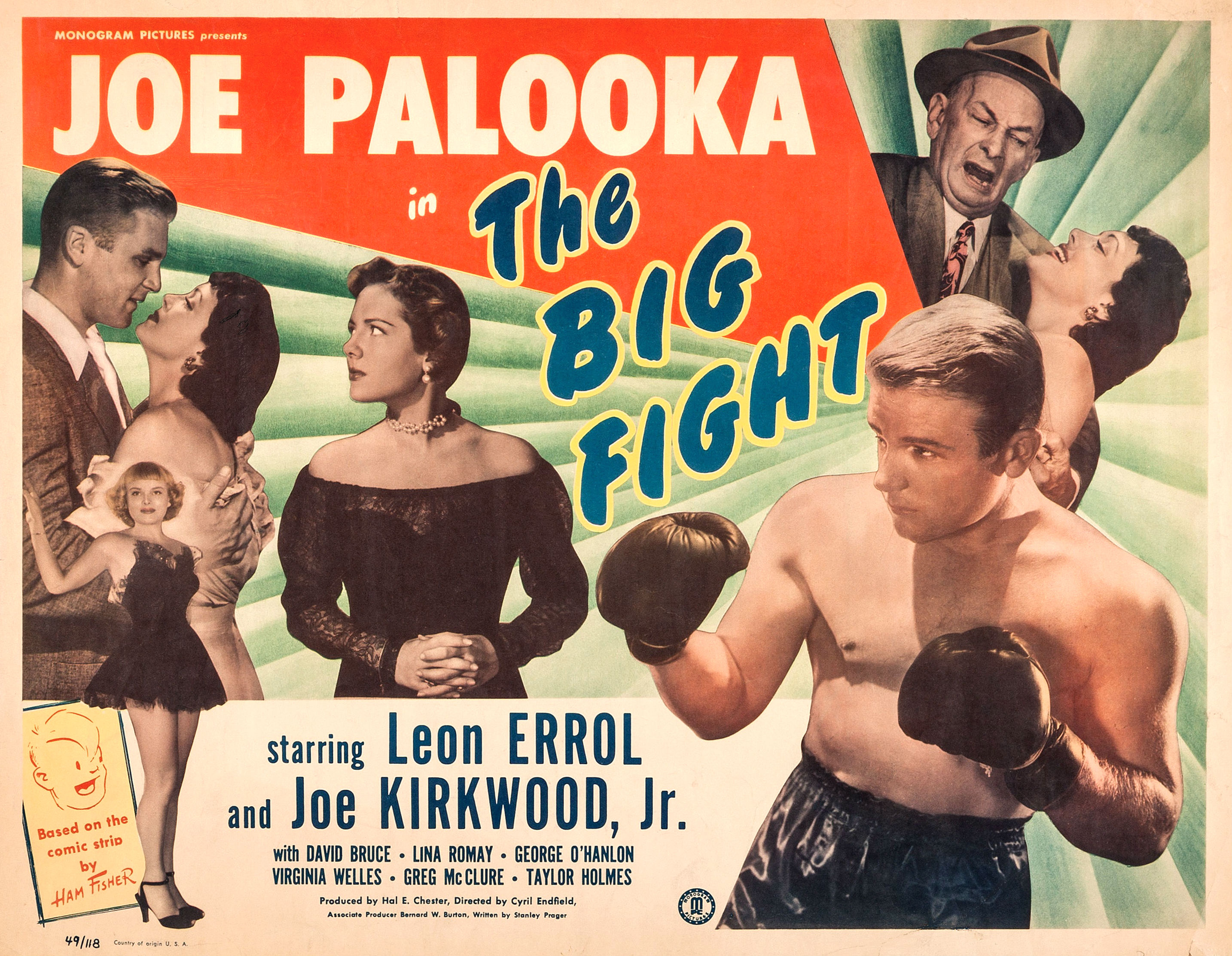
- Directed by: Cy Endfield
- Screenplay by: Stanley Prager
- Produced by: Hal E. Chester
- Starring: Leon Errol; Joe Kirkwood Jr
- Cinematography: Mack Stengler
- Edited by: Otho Lovering; Fred Maguire
- Music by: Edward J. Kay
- Production company: Monogram Pictures
- Distributed by: Monogram Pictures
- Release date: 1949
- Running time: 66 mins
- Language: English

Joe Palooka in the Big Fight is a 1949 comedy film directed by Cy Endfield, based on the comic strip by Ham Fisher. It is an entry in Monogram's Joe Palooka series.

== Plot ==
Joe is framed by gamblers who hope to fix the outcome of an upcoming boxing match. When Joe manages to clear his name, the gamblers frame the scrupulously honest boxer with murder. On the run from the law, Joe is forced to turn gumshoe and solve the murder himself—and he'd better hurry if he's going to get to the Big Fight on time.

== Cast ==
- Leon Errol as Knobby
- Joe Kirkwood, Jr. as Joe Palooka
- David Bruce as Tom Conway
- Lina Romay as Maxine Harlan
- George O'Hanlon as Louie
- Virginia Welles as Anne Howe
- Greg McClure as Grady
- Taylor Holmes as Dr. Benson
- Ian Macdonald as Mike
- Lou Lubin as Talmadge
- Bert Conway as Pee Wee
- Lyle Talbot as Lt. Muldoon
- Benny Baker as Fight Secretary
- Eddie Gribbon as Canvas
- Jack Roper as Scranton
- Frances Osborne as Wardrobe Woman
- Harry Hayden as Commissioner L.R. Harris
- Frank Fenton as Detective Williams
- George Fisher as Contest Announcer
- Ned Glass as Frank T. Macy, Fight Manager
- Dick Elliott as Fight Promoter
- John Indrisano as First Referee
- Harry Tyler as Romero's Manager
- Paul Maxey as Mr. Howe
- Dewey Robinson as Detective Burns

== Critical reception ==
TV Guide noted a "better-than-average "Joe Palooka" film...Making the most of realistic dialog, director Cyril Endfield moves the film along at a nice pace while holding together a number of plot lines. Surprisingly, there isn't much boxing footage in this one.
