= Joe Kirkwood =

Joe Kirkwood may refer to:

- Joe Kirkwood Sr. (1897–1970), Australian golfer
- Joe Kirkwood Jr. (1920–2006), professional golfer and film actor
