= Stanley Prager =

American actor and director

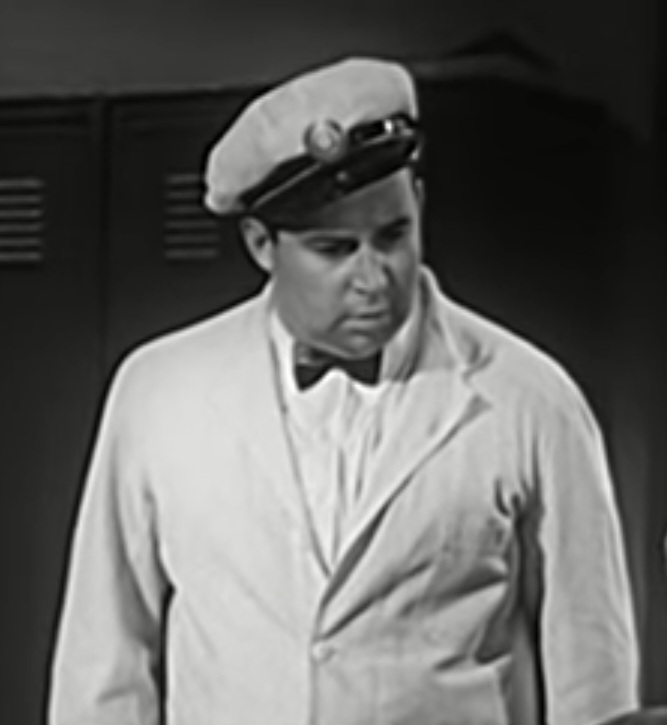
- Prager in Behind Green Lights (1946)
- Born: January 8, 1917; New York City, U.S.
- Died: January 18, 1972 (aged 55); Los Angeles, California, U.S.
- Occupations: Actor; theatre director; TV producer
- Years active: 1939–1972
- Spouse: Georgann Johnson (m. 1956)
- Children: 4

Stanley Prager (January 8, 1917 – January 18, 1972) was an American actor and a television and theatre director.

== Career ==
Prager was born in New York City. He spent three years at Johns Hopkins University before working in summer stock and on Broadway, where he appeared in The Skin of Our Teeth and The Eve of St. Mark. He appeared in the film version of Eve of St. Mark and spent the remainder of the decade acting in mostly B-movies, with occasional roles in better films such as A Bell for Adano, Gun Crazy, In the Meantime, Darling, and A Foreign Affair. He told an interviewer in 1969 that as an actor he appeared in “all the parts that Phil Silvers wouldn't play.”

Prager returned to Broadway and won critical praise in 1951 for his performance in the Comden and Green revue, Two on the Aisle. He played Faker Englund in a 1953 revival of Room Service, and in 1954 he was Prez in The Pajama Game.

=== Blacklisting and subsequent career ===
In the early 1950s, Prager was blacklisted. In March 1953, former screenwriter Bart Lytton, told the House Un-American Activities Committee that Prager was among the persons he had seen at Communist Party meetings.

In August 1955, Prager and other performers refused to answer questions when called before the Committee, saying that "I believe that what I think and what I say and with whom I associate is not this committee's concern." In July 1956, Prager was one of seven witnesses, including playwright Arthur Miller, who were cited for contempt of Congress of Congress by the House of Representatives. The other six included stage actress Sarah Cunningham, her husband John Randolph, and actors Lou Polan and George Tyne.

Critic Howard Kissel recounted in 1998 that the backers were wary of casting Prager for the play. The director George Abbott called a meeting of the creative staff and told them of the backers' concerns. He decided to retain Prager. According to a 1976 newspaper account, Abbott decided to renew Prager's contract early in 1955 so that he would not be fired when he appeared before the committee. According to Kissel, Prager was given a run of the play contract in 1954 despite his blacklisting,

He subsequently began directing with Neil Simon's Come Blow Your Horn in 1961. Additional theatre directing credits include Bravo Giovanni, Minnie's Boys, Don't Drink the Water, and 70, Girls, 70.

Prager's television directing credits include The Love Song of Barney Kempinski for ABC Stage 67, Car 54, Where Are You?, and The Patty Duke Show. For producer Sidney Pink, Prager directed two films in Europe: Madigan's Millions the first film to star Dustin Hoffman, and Bang Bang Kid starring Tom Bosley and Guy Madison.

== Personal life ==
Prager married actress Georgann Johnson in 1956. They remained together until his death on January 18, 1972, while on a business trip to Los Angeles. The couple had four daughters, Carol, Ann, Sally and Molly.

== Filmography ==
Year	Title	Role	Notes
1944	The Eve of St. Mark	Pvt. Glinka	
1944	Take It or Leave It	Herb Gordon	
1944	In the Meantime, Darling	Lt. Philip 'Red' Pianatowski	
1944	Something for the Boys	Corporal	Uncredited
1945	Junior Miss	Joe - Elevator Operator	
1945	A Bell for Adano	Sgt. Trampani	
1945	Doll Face	Flo's Aide	
1946	Behind Green Lights	Ruzinsky - Milkman	
1946	Do You Love Me	Jay Dilly	
1946	Gentleman Joe Palooka	Rapadsky	
1947	The Shocking Miss Pilgrim	Office Lookout	Uncredited
1947	Stork Bites Man	Invisible Stork	Voice
1948	Here Comes Trouble	Cartoonist	Uncredited
1948	A Foreign Affair	Mike	
1948	They Live by Night	Short Order Man	Uncredited
1948	Joe Palooka in Winner Take All	Reporter	
1948	You Gotta Stay Happy	Jack Samuels	
1948	Force of Evil	Wally	
1949	The Lady Takes a Sailor	Taxi Driver	Uncredited
1950	Gun Crazy	Bluey-Bluey	
1950	Joe Palooka in Humphrey Takes a Chance	Ward	Uncredited
1950	I'll Get By	Song Plugger	Uncredited
1950	Dark City	Sammy	Uncredited
1950	Joe Palooka in the Squared Circle	TV Announcer	
1950	Three Husbands	Sharpy - Tout	Uncredited
1951	M	Police Detective	Uncredited
