= Joe Palooka in the Knockout =

1947 film directed by Reginald LeBorg

- Directed by: Reginald LeBorg
- Based on: Joe Palooka by Ham Fisher
- Produced by: Hal E. Chester; Bernard W. Burton
- Starring: Leon Errol; Joe Kirkwood, Jr. Elyse Knox
- Cinematography: William A. Sickner
- Edited by: Warren Adams; Otho Lovering
- Music by: Edward J. Kay
- Production company: Monogram Pictures
- Distributed by: Monogram Pictures
- Release date: September 20, 1947
- Running time: 72 minuters
- Country: United States
- Language: English

Joe Palooka in the Knockout is a 1947 American comedy film directed by Reginald LeBorg. It was the third part of the Joe Palooka series from Monogram Pictures starring Joe Kirkwood, Jr. as the boxer and Leon Errol as his manager. The film also featured Elyse Knox, Marc Lawrence and Trudy Marshall.

The original title for the film was "Than Guy Palooka."

== Plot ==
A distraught Joe Palooka doesn't want to fight any more after believing he killed an opponent in the ring. Joe doesn't know that gamblers John Mitchell and Howard Abbott conspired to drug the victim by blackmailing his manager, Max Steele, who unwittingly caused the boxer's death.

Joe's manager Knobby Walsh and a pal, Sam "Glass Jaw" Wheeler, fail to console Joe, but the dead boxer's fiancee, singer Nina Carroll, explains to Joe how he wasn't responsible. Joe proceeds to help police investigate the crime. It turns out Sam is actually an undercover cop.

A furious Max ends up killing Mitchell out of revenge. Nightclub owner Abbott, after hiring Nina to sing, plots to have Joe killed in his upcoming bout by once again using a poisoned mouthguard. Knobby and a helpful dog save Joe just in time.

== Cast ==
- Leon Errol as Knobby
- Joe Kirkwood, Jr. as Joe Palooka
- Elyse Knox as Anne Howe
- Sarah Padden as Ma Palooka
- Marc Lawrence as Mitchell
- Trudy Marshall as Nina
- Whitford Kane as Steele
- Billy House as Sam
- Benny Baker as Looie
- Morris Carnovsky as Abbott
- Dave Barry as Eddie Steele
- Donald MacBride as Crockett
- Danny Morton as Pusher Moore
- Vince Barnett as Russell
- Clarence Muse as Smoky
- Michael Mark as Pop Palooka
- Chester Clute as Hotel Clerk
- Eddie Gribbon as Canvasback
- James Flavin as Policeman
- Ray Walker as Reporter

== Theme ==
The Joe Palooka series typically incorporated criminal activity into its narratives. Film historian Wheeler W. Dixon notes the demimonde atmosphere that pervades Joe Palooka in the Knockout: "Grubby, dangerous, and controlled by shadowy forces who have only their own interests at heart."

== Bibliography ==
- Drew, Bernard A. Motion Picture Series and Sequels: A Reference Guide. Routledge, 2013.
