= Sheldon Hall (film historian) =

British film historian

Sheldon Hall is a film historian based in the Humanities department of Sheffield Hallam University.

His books include Epics, Spectacles, and Blockbusters (co-written with Steve Neale) which Jim Whalley called "an important addition to work considering popular film and film industries". He also wrote Zulu: With Some Guts Behind It about the 1964 film. His latest book, Armchair Cinema: A History of Feature Films on British Television, 1929-1981, was published in June 2024.

== Biography ==
Sheldon teaches in the Film Studies department at Sheffield Hallam University, where he has taught since 1997. He was previously a lecturer at the University of Northumbria. He had been a freelance journalist and lecturer based in the North East of England, and was for eleven years the film and theatre critic of the major regional newspaper, the Northern Echo. Sheldon has also recorded audio commentaries for DVDs and contributed to Channel 4 and BBC Four documentaries.

== Published works ==
=== Books ===
- Zulu: With Some Guts Behind It (Tomahawk Press (GA), 2005, ISBN 0-9531926-6-0)
- Epics, Spectacles and Blockbusters (co-authored with Steve Neale; Detroit: Wayne State University Press, 2010, ISBN 978-0-8143-3008-1)
- Widescreen Worldwide (co-edited with Steve Neale and John Belton; John Libbey Publishing, 2010, ISBN 978-0-8619-6694-3)
- Armchair Cinema: A History of Feature Films on British Television, 1929-1981 (Edinburgh University Press, 2025). ISBN 9781399520140.

=== Chapters in books ===
- How the West Was Won: History, Spectacle and the American Mountains’, in Ian Cameron and Douglas Pye (eds.), The Movie Book of the Western (London: Studio Vista, 1996)
- "The Wrong Sort of Cinema: Refashioning the Heritage Film Debate", in Robert Murphy (ed.), The British Cinema Book (Second Edition, BFI Publishing, 2001), ISBN 0-85170-851-X, pp. 191–99. (To be revised and expanded in 2007.)
- "Monkey Feathers: Defending Zulu", in Claire Monk and Amy Sargeant (eds), British Historical Cinema (Routledge, 2002) ISBN 0-415-23810-2, pp. 110–28.
- "Tall Revenue Features: The Genealogy of the Contemporary Blockbuster", in Steve Neale (ed.), Genre and Contemporary Hollywood (BFI Publishing, 2002), ISBN 0-85170-887-0, pp. 11–26.
- "Carpenter’s Widescreen Style", in Ian Conrich and David Woods (eds), The Cinema of John Carpenter: The Technique of Terror (Wallflower Press, 2004), ISBN 1-904764-14-2, pp. 66–77.
- "Twentieth Century Fox in the 1960s", "Blockbusters in the 1970s" and "The Sound of Music", in Linda Ruth Williams and Michael Hammond (eds), Contemporary American Cinema (McGraw-Hill/ Open University Press, 2006), ISBN 0-335-21831-8, pp. 26–28, 46-49, 164-81.
- Six entries in Alastair Phillips and Ginette Vincendeau (eds), Journeys of Desire: European Actors in Hollywood (BFI Publishing, 2006), ISBN 1-84457-124-6, pp. 170, 196-98, 240, 276-77, 336-37, 469.
- Thirty-nine entries in Robert Murphy (ed.), Directors in British and Irish Cinema: A Reference Guide (BFI Publishing, 2006), ISBN 1-84457-126-2.
- Three chapters in Ian Cameron (ed.), Unexplored Hitchcock (Moffat: Cameron and Hollis, forthcoming).

=== Journal articles ===
- "Selling Religion: How to Market a Biblical Epic", Film History, 14: 2 (2002), pp. 170–85.
- "Dial M for Murder", Film History, 16: 2 (2004), pp. 243–55.
- "Rodoslovlje modernog blockbustera", Hrvatski filmski Ljetopis, 40 (2004) pp. 5–16 (Croatian translation of ‘Tall Revenue Features’ [see above] in Neale, Genre and Contemporary Hollywood).
- Review article, "British Social Realism: In Print and on DVD", in Viewfinder, no. 54 (March 2004), pp. 8–10.
- Book reviews, "British Social Realism: From Documentary to Brit Grit" and "J. Lee Thompson", both in Journal of British Cinema and Television, 1:2 (2004), pp. 306–09, 321-24.
- "The Hills Are Alive in East Anglia: The Sound of Music Comes to Norwich", Picture House, no. 30 (2005), pp. 34–39.
- Book review, "ABC: The First Name in Entertainment", et al., Journal of British Cinema and Television, 3:1 (2006), pp. 188–91.
- Internet Article: "Size Still Matters! The 2004 Oslo 70mm Film Festival", posted 1 October 2004, in70mm.com: The 70mm Newsletter (http://www.in70mm.com/news/2004/oslo/oslo_2004.htm)

== Other writings ==
- An Opera of Violence - Documentary on Sergio Leone's Once Upon a Time in the West
- Something to Do with Death - Further documentary on Once Upon a Time in the West
- The Wages of Sin - Further documentary on Once Upon a Time in the West

The above three titles are featured on the 2003 special edition DVD release of Once Upon a Time in the West

- The Making of 'Zulu': ...and Snappeth the Spear in Sunder - Documentary available on the 2002 special edition DVD release of Cy Endfield's Zulu
