= Joe Antonacci =

American boxing ring announcer

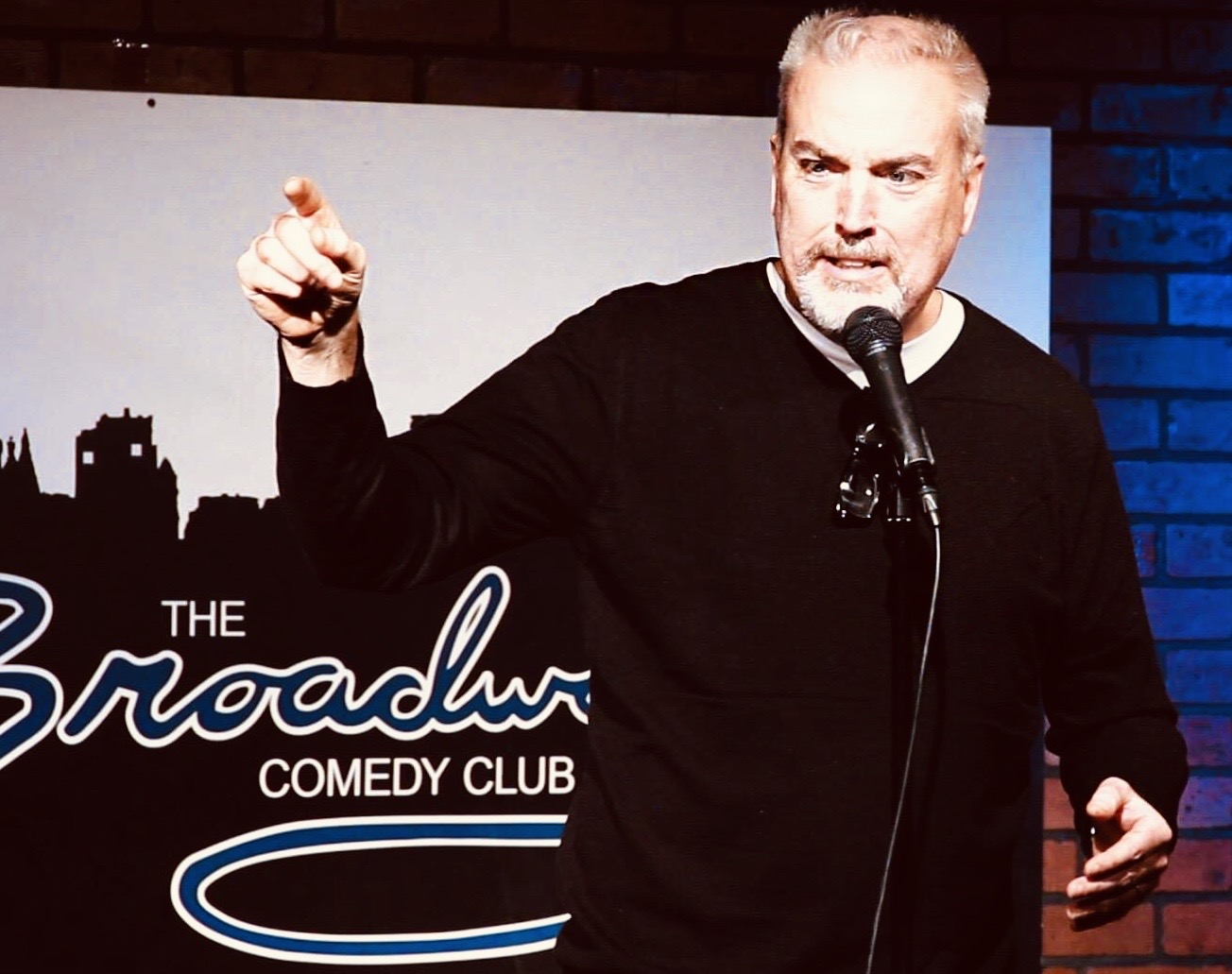
Joe Antonacci performing at the Broadway Comedy Club

Joseph John Antonacci (August 9, 1960 – April 25, 2024) was an American boxing ring announcer and emcee famous for his televised boxing ring appearances in a tuxedo on ESPN's Friday Night Fights, NBC Sports Network, CBS Sports, Fox Sports, HBO, Showtime, and GoFightLive.TV. He was born in Ridgewood, New Jersey on August 9, 1960.

Nicknamed 'Generous Joe', he donates all of his ring earnings to assist injured and retired amateur and professional boxers in need, to overcome their disabilities incurred as a result of bouts in the ring, and to amateur boxing organizations. Antonacci also serves as a ring announcer for mixed martial arts fights.

== Biography ==
=== Career ===
Antonacci had worked for all of the major promoters in boxing, including Bob Arum’s Top Rank, Oscar De La Hoya’s Golden Boy Promotions, Don King’s Don King Productions and North Jersey’s Main Events, headed by Kathy Duva. His adventures as a ring announcer have taken him from Madison Square Garden to Macau, China, where Antonacci announced the first ever professional fight card in that venue, from The Venetian Macao. In March 2012, Antonacci was elected as a member of the New Jersey Boxing Hall of Fame, headed by boxing historian Henry Hascup. Antonacci was also nominated in 2012 for a 'Good Guy Award' from the Boxing Writer's Association of America.

=== Comedian and actor ===
Antonacci was also an award-winning comedian based in Chicago who has played the top comedy clubs in Chicago and New York City. He was a finalist in The Clean Comedy Challenge in Pasadena, California. Joe’s brand of humor appeals to audiences of all ages. Joe has appeared in over a dozen television series, films and music videos.

=== Personal life ===
He was a graduate of William Paterson University with a B.A. degree in English. He resided with his wife Diane and two children in Ridgewood, New Jersey for many years before moving to Lombard, Illinois.

== Filmography ==
Ring announcer Joe Antonacci has appeared as himself in four motion pictures:

- Lights Out (2011 TV series)
- They’re Just My Friends (2006)
- Orthodox Stance (2007)
- The Challenger (2012)

== Joe Palooka comic book ==
He owns the trademark to and has recreated Joe Palooka, an American comic book, formerly about a heavyweight boxing champion that debuted in 1930 and ran until the 1980s. A brand new comic book version of the character is currently being offered for sale online, created by Antonacci and his creative team. Palooka is reborn as a Mixed Martial Arts (MMA) fighter. Antonacci's team has also created a sister series of MMA-themed comic books entitled Legion of Combat.

== Death ==
Joe Antonacci died of a heart attack on April 25, 2024, at the age of 63.
