= Joe Palooka =

1930–1984 American comic strip

- Ham Fisher's Joe Palooka (June 25, 1939) (Full size here)
- Author: Ham Fisher (1930–1955); Moe Leff (1956–1959); Morris Weiss (1959–1984)
- Illustrator(s): Ham Fisher (1930–1955); Moe Leff (1955–1959); Tony DiPreta (1959–1984)
- Current status/schedule: Concluded daily & Sunday strip
- Launch date: April 21, 1930
- End date: November 24, 1984
- Alternate name: Joe the Dumbbell
- Syndicate(s): McNaught Syndicate
- Publisher(s): Columbia Comics; Harvey Comics; IDW Publishing
- Genre: Sports

Joe Palooka, an American comic strip about a heavyweight boxing champion, was originally created by cartoonist Ham Fisher. The strip debuted on April 19, 1930, and was carried at its peak by 900 newspapers. The McNaught Syndicate cancelled the strip with effect from November 1984.

Adaptations and spin-offs of the comic strip include a 15-minute CBS radio series, 12 feature-length films (chiefly from Monogram Pictures), nine Vitaphone film shorts, a 1954 syndicated television series (The Joe Palooka Story), comic books and merchandise, including a 1940s board game, a 1947 New Haven Clock and Watch Company wristwatch, a 1948 metal lunchbox featuring depictions of Joe, Humphrey, and Little Max, and a 1946 Wheaties cereal-box cut-out mask. In 1980, a mountain in Pennsylvania was named for the character.

== Publication history ==
In his home town of Wilkes-Barre, Pennsylvania, Fisher devised the character in 1921 after he met a boxer, Pete Latzo, outside a poolroom. As Fisher explained in an article in Collier's:

Here, made to order, was the comic strip character I had been looking for—a big, good-natured prize fighter who didn't like to fight; a defender of little guys; a gentle knight. I ran back to the office, drew a set of strips, and rushed to the newspaper syndicates.

Many rejections followed before Fisher's strip was finally syndicated by the McNaught Syndicate after Fisher, while employed as a McNaught salesman, sold it to over 20 newspapers. It debuted April 21, 1930, and by 1948, it was ranked as one of the five most popular newspaper comic strips.

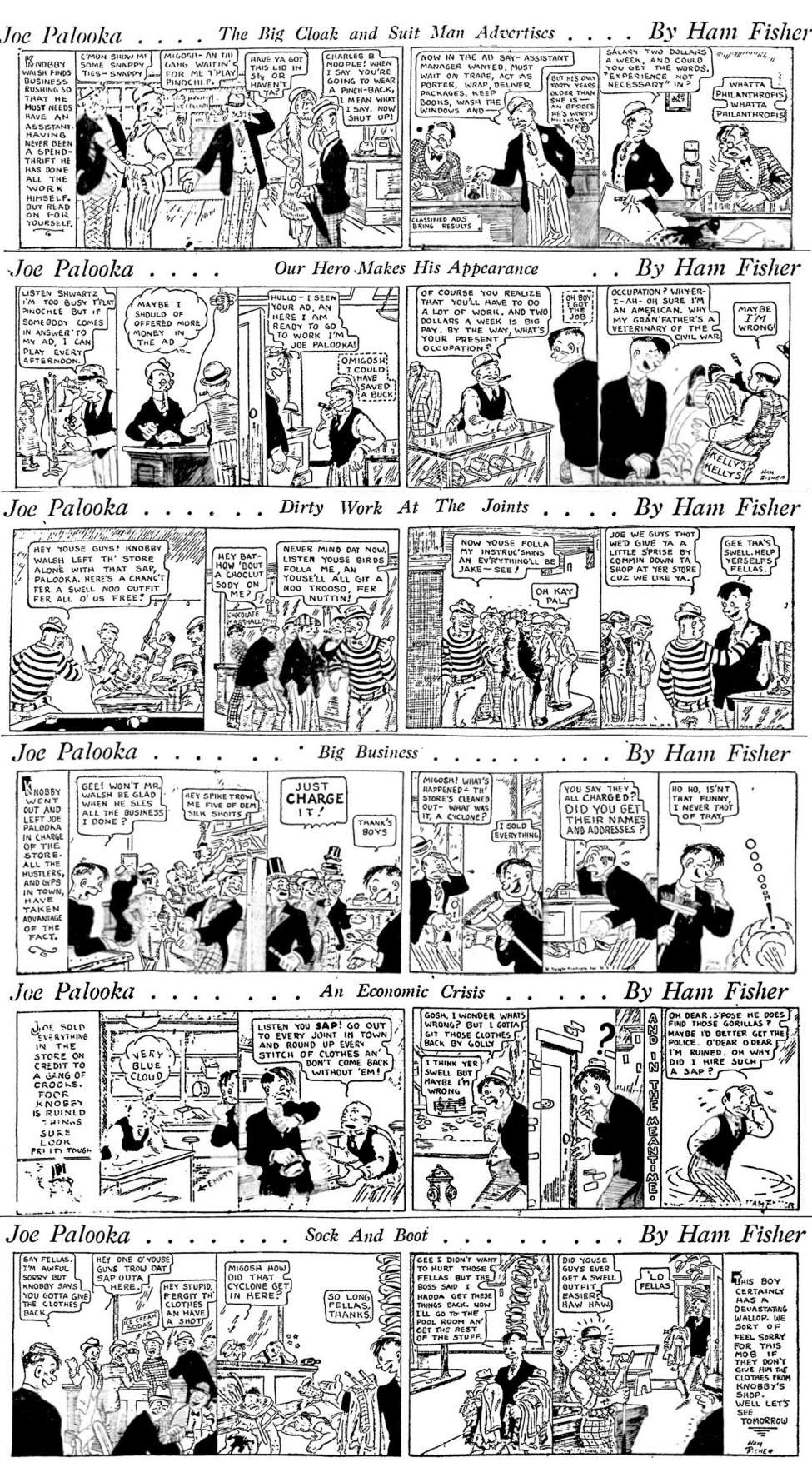
Joe Palooka's first appearance, April 1930

After Fisher committed suicide in 1955, his assistant, Moe Leff, drew the strip for four years. Leff had been ghosting on the strip's art since the late 1930s; his first credited strip was September 17, 1956. Lank Leonard recommended Tony DiPreta, who stepped in starting September 7, 1959, to illustrate scripts by Morris Weiss (early 1960s to early 1970s) and Ed Moore (mid-1970s on). DiPreta stayed with the strip for 25 years until it ended its run November 24, 1984, when it had dropped to only 182 newspapers. DiPreta then moved on to draw Rex Morgan, M.D.

== Toppers ==
The Joe Palooka Sunday page had many different toppers over the course of the run.

One of the early toppers was Fisher's Looney Legends, which ran from January 10, 1932, to August 27, 1933. During this run, the strip had many alternate titles, including Fisher's Dopey Dramas, Fisher's Foolish Fables, Fisher's Historical Hysteria, Fisher's Neolithic Narratives, Fisher's Nursery Rhymes, and Fisher's Poet's Corner. This was replaced by three longer features: Fisher's History of Boxing (Sept 3, 1933 – June 20, 1937), Joe Palooka's Boxing Course (June 27, 1937 – May 1, 1938) and Joe Palooka's Album (May 8, 1938 – Nov 14, 1943).

From 1943–1946, the topper strip rotated between a variety of different features. The most often used titles during this period were War Time Anecdotes a.k.a. Fisher's Wartime Whoppers (Nov 21, 1943 – Sept 9, 1945), Miss Jones a.k.a. The Estimable Miss Jones (March 12, 1944 – Nov 11, 1945), After It's Over (April 8 – Oct 7, 1945), Sidewalks of Manhattan (Nov 18, 1945 – Feb 24, 1966), Charlie the Cook (Oct 15, 1944 – Sept 23, 1945), and Lady De Van (March 3 – July 7, 1946). Other titles used during this period include The Atom Age, Captain Tommy, Could Be, Guy Who Married a WAC Sergeant, Fisher's Follies, How To Be Popular?, Letter From Home, Mebbe I'm Wrong, Now That It's Over, Smythe the Murp's Ex-Butler, and Two Thousand A.D.

== Characters and story ==
Fisher originally changed the appearance of Palooka to fit each reigning real-life champ – until the coming of African-American Joe Louis in the 1930s, when the image of the cowlicked blond Palooka remained unchanged. Though his adventures were mostly low-key, he was pumped up by a supporting cast led by girlfriend Ann Howe, boxing manager Knobby Walsh, his mute orphan sidekick Little Max, Smokey, his black valet and later sparring partner, and lovable giant Humphrey Pennyworth, a smiling blacksmith who wielded a 100-pound (45 kg) maul. Like Ozark Ike McBatt in baseball, Joe Palooka was intended to exemplify the sports hero in an age when uprightness of character was supposed to matter most. The character was part of an effort among top newspaper cartoonists to sell World War II-era Series E bonds to the public as a wartime financing initiative.

Joe Palooka plays golf with Bob Hope and Bing Crosby in a 1949 Joe Palooka strip by Ham Fisher and Moe Leff.

The strip garnered much publicity when cheese heiress Ann Howe and Joe were married on June 24, 1949. The engraved invitations for the event, sent to a select list of celebrities, read: "Mr. Ham Fisher requests the honour of your presence at the marriage of Ann Howe to Mr. Joe Palooka on the afternoon of June 24th in your favorite newspaper." Fisher received formal acceptances from Chief Justice Fred M. Vinson, General Omar Bradley, and Attorney General Tom C. Clark. At the time, the strip was carried in 665 American newspapers and 125 foreign papers.

== Etymology ==
Of uncertain origin, the word "palooka" was found in print as early as 1923 and widely used to mean a lout or an inept fighter.

== Comic books ==
Joe Palooka #3 (1942)

Over decades, Joe Palooka appeared in comic books from several publishers. Early comic books offered strip reprints, but eventually, the character was seen in original comic-book stories. Secondary characters Little Max and Humphrey Pennyworth each had his own Harvey Comics series.

Joe Antonacci owns the trademark to and has recreated Joe Palooka. A brand new comic-book version of the character created by Antonacci and his creative team was published by IDW Publishing in 2012. Palooka is reborn as a mixed martial arts (MMA) fighter. Antonacci's team has also created a sister series of MMA-themed comic books entitled Legion of Combat.

== Radio series ==
On radio, Joe Palooka was broadcast on CBS from April 12 to August 18, 1932. With Teddy Bergman in the title role, the 15-minute series was heard on Tuesdays and Thursdays, sponsored by Heinz Rice Flakes. Elmira Roessler, Elsie Hitz, and Mary Jane Higby played Ann Howe. Knobby Walsh was portrayed by Frank Readick and Hal Lansing. Others in the cast were Karl Swenson and Norman Gottschalk. The announcer was Harry von Zell.

== Films and television ==
Joe Palooka made his film debut in Palooka (1934) with Stuart Erwin in the title role, Jimmy Durante as Knobby, Lupe Vélez as Nina Madero, and Marjorie Rambeau as Mayme Palooka. Now in the public domain, the film can be seen online. Palooka was followed by a series of nine two-reel Vitaphone shorts (1936–37) starring Robert Norton as Joe and Shemp Howard as Knobby.

He returned to feature-length films in 1946, when Monogram Pictures launched a series of 11 low-budget films starring Joe Kirkwood, Jr. as Joe, Leon Errol as Knobby, and Elyse Knox as Ann Howe. The first in the series was Joe Palooka, Champ (1946); the series ended 1951, with Joe Palooka in Triple Cross.

The Joe Palooka Story, popularly known simply as Joe Palooka, was a 1954 syndicated television series starring Kirkwood and featuring former boxing champion Maxie Rosenbloom as Humphrey Pennyworth.

== Cultural legacy ==
The name appears in several episodes of the long-running television show M*A*S*H, most notably in the 10th-season episode "Heroes", where fictional prize fighter "Gentleman Joe" Cavanaugh visits the outfit and Margaret remarks, "Is that what it takes to get a steak dinner around here, a visit from some Joe Palooka?"

South of Wilkes-Barre, Pennsylvania, on the way to the town of Mountain Top, Pennsylvania, is Joe Palooka Mountain, named in the early 1980s by the then-mayor of Wilkes-Barre, Thomas McLaughlin. A granite monument with the likeness of Joe Palooka is located at the base of the mountain at the intersection of Pennsylvania State Routes 309 and 437, between Wilkes-Barre and the town of Mountain Top.

In September 1948, a limestone Joe Palooka statue (in a flowing cape) was erected on a hill overlooking Indiana State Road 37. In 1984, the nine-foot high, ten-ton statue and its base were moved and rededicated to the town hall in Oolitic, Indiana.

In The Story of a Shipwrecked Sailor, sailor Luis Alejandro Velasco refers to a "Joe Palooka" tavern at a port in Mobile, Alabama, United States, where his shipmates and he, while on leave, went to drink whisky and throw a fight from time to time.

In Sometimes a Great Notion, Ken Kesey skewers one of his characters with this paragraph: "'Tsk, tsk,' said Brother Walker. And, as he had learned the comment from Joe Palooka, it came out 'tisk tisk', the way he assumed it was pronounced."

In the 1977 film Smokey and the Bandit, after having been drawn into a fight and taking a beating, character Cledus "Snowman" Snow (Jerry Reed) tells his friend Bo "Bandit" Darville (Burt Reynolds) over the CB radio, "Look, you ain't gonna believe this, but I just did my imitation of Joe Palooka."

== Filmography ==
The Knockout (1947) with Joe Kirkwood, Jr. as Joe Palooka

1. Palooka (1934)
2. Joe Palooka, Champ (1946)
3. Gentleman Joe Palooka (1946)
4. Joe Palooka in the Knockout (1947)
5. Joe Palooka in Fighting Mad (1948)
6. Joe Palooka in Winner Take All (1948)
7. Joe Palooka in the Big Fight (1949)
8. Joe Palooka in the Counterpunch (1949)
9. Joe Palooka Meets Humphrey (1950)
10. Joe Palooka in Humphrey Takes a Chance (1950)
11. Joe Palooka in the Squared Circle (1950)
12. Joe Palooka in Triple Cross (1951)

=== Vitaphone two-reelers ===
(made for Warner Brothers)

1. For the Love of Pete (March 14, 1936)
2. Here's Howe (June 6, 1936)
3. Punch and Beauty (August 6, 1936)
4. The Choke's on You (September 12, 1936)
5. The Blonde Bomber (November 28, 1936)
6. Kick Me Again (February 6, 1937)
7. Taking the Count (April 24, 1937)
8. Thirst Aid (June 12, 1937)
9. Calling All Kids (November 20, 1937)

All were directed by Lloyd French and starred Robert Norton and Shemp Howard (except the last two with Beverly Phalon and Johnny Burkes).
