= Joe Palooka in the Counterpunch =

1949 film directed by Reginald LeBorg

- Theatrical poster
- Directed by: Reginald LeBorg
- Screenplay by: Henry Blankfort; Cyril Endfield
- Based on: Joe Palooka by Ham Fisher
- Produced by: Hal E. Chester
- Starring: Joe Kirkwood, Jr. Leon Errol; Elyse Knox; Marcel Journet
- Edited by: Otho Lovering
- Music by: Edward J. Kay
- Release date: 1949
- Running time: 65 minutes
- Country: United States
- Language: English

Joe Palooka in the Counterpunch is a 1949 American film directed by Reginald LeBorg. It was one in the series of Joe Palooka films for Monogram starring Leon Errol. It was co-written by Cy Endfield.

== Plot ==
Joe heads for South America to fight the Latin champ and defend his title. Shipboard, he helps federal agents fight counterfeiters. He also spars with love interest Anne Howe

== Cast ==
- Leon Errol as Knobby Walsh
- Joe Kirkwood, Jr. as Joe Palooka
- Elyse Knox as Anne Howe
- Marcel Journet as Anton Kindel
- Sheila Ryan as Myra Madison
- Frank Sully as Looie
- Ian Wolfe as Prof. Lilliquist
- Walter Sande as Austin
- Douglass Dumbrille as Capt. Lance
- Douglas Fowley as Thurston
- Eddie Gribbon as Canvasback
- Ralph Graves as Dr. Colman
- Roland Dupree as Bellboy
- Gertrude Messinger as Nurse
- Pedro de Cordoba as Museum Caretaker

== Retrospective appraisal ==
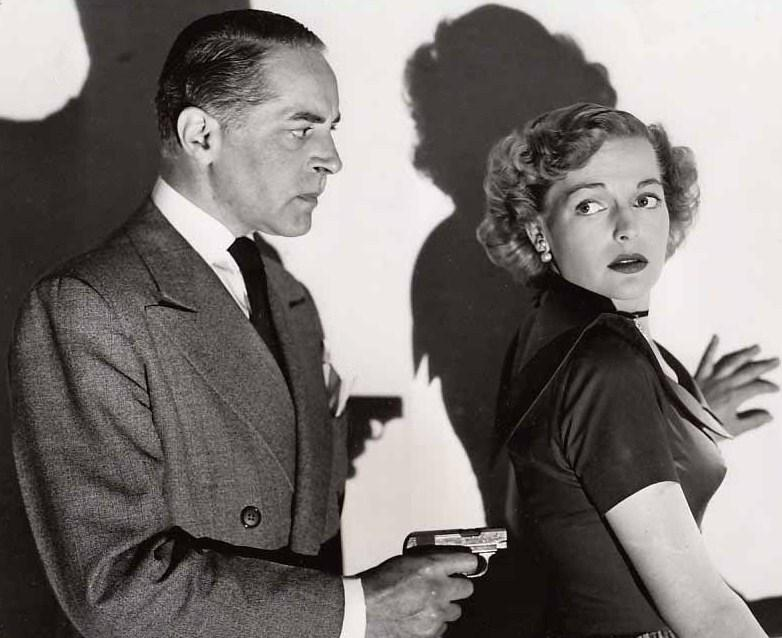
Marcel Journet (actor) and Elyse Knox in Joe Palooka in the Counterpunch (publicity still)

In a "departure from for the series" this Joe Palooka's adventure is set in the tropics of South America. As such, the film resembles the "jungle"-themed serials produced by Universal and Republic studios.

Film historian Wheeler W. Dixon surmises that "Monogram was running out of purely pugilistic situations for Palooka character" and accordingly moved the story "out of the locker room." Dixon registers praise for LeBorg's adroit direction:

LeBorg staged the film with great attention to lighting and set details, while relying mostly on stock footage and back-lot sets for what little "South American" ambiance the film could afford.
