= Juvenile Court (1938 film) =

1938 film

- Theatrical release poster
- Directed by: D. Ross Lederman
- Written by: Michael L. Simmons; Robert E. Kent; Henry Taylor
- Starring: Paul Kelly
- Cinematography: Benjamin Kline
- Edited by: Byron Robinson
- Distributed by: Columbia Pictures
- Release date: September 15, 1938
- Running time: 60 minutes
- Country: United States
- Language: English

Juvenile Court is a 1938 American crime film directed by D. Ross Lederman.

It was highly influenced by the popularity of 1930s juvenile delinquency films, especially the Dead End Kids group.

== Plot ==
Gary Franklin is a public defender and is frustrated that isn't able to save Dutch Adams from execution. He tried to blame the environment Adams grew up in as the reason for his criminal activity. Adams's sister, Marcia, tries to get the public funds to provide recreational places for impoverished neighborhood.

== Cast ==
- Paul Kelly as Gary Franklin
- Rita Hayworth as Marcia Adams
- Frankie Darro as Stubby
- Hal E. Chester as Lefty (as Hally Chester)
- Don Latorre as Mickey
- David Gorcey as Pighead
- Richard Selzer as Ears (as Dick Selzer)
- Allan Ramsay as Davy
- Charles Hart as Squarehead
- Howard C. Hickman as Governor Stanley (as Howard Hickman)
