= Cy Endfield =

American-British film director (1914–1995)

- Born: November 10, 1914; Scranton, Pennsylvania, U.S.
- Died: April 16, 1995 (aged 80); Shipston-on-Stour, Warwickshire, England
- Education: Scranton public schools; Yale University (1933-35)
- Occupations: Director; screenwriter; producer; magician; inventor; designer
- Years active: 1942–1979
- Spouse(s): Frances Shurack, married May 14, 1939; Divorced. Maureen Forshaw, married March 31, 1956
- Children: Cathy (first marriage); Suzannah; Eden
- Awards: Silver Medallion, Telluride Film Festival (1993); British Design Award (1990)

Cyril Raker Endfield (November 10, 1914 – April 16, 1995) was an American film director, who at times also worked as a writer, theatre director, and inventor. Born in Scranton, Pennsylvania, he worked in the New York theatre in the late 1930s before moving to Hollywood in 1940.

After World War II, his film career was interrupted by the Hollywood blacklist. He resettled in London at the end of 1951. He is particularly known for The Sound of Fury (1950), Hell Drivers (1957) and Zulu (1964).

== Early life and career ==
Cyril Endfield was born in Scranton, Pennsylvania on November 10, 1914, the first of three children. His parents were first generation Jewish immigrants from Eastern Europe; his father ran a fur business. A bright boy, Cyril developed an early interest both in chess and sleight-of-hand card magic, publishing a routine in a magicians’ magazine at the age of 16. In 1932 he won a scholarship to Yale, but delayed his arrival by a year because of the collapse of his father's business during the Depression. While in Scranton, he first met Israel Shapiro (Paul Jarrico), a politically conscious screenwriter-to-be who would become a life-long friend.^{[i]}

In his two years at Yale, Endfield's attitude to his studies was ‘rather lackadaisical’ (his own description in a letter to Jarrico), although he read widely, and developed an extra-curricular interest in new science fiction.^{[ii]} Much of his time in New Haven was devoted to the intertwined worlds of theatre and radical politics: he joined the local Unity Theatre and was an active member of the Young Communist League. Rather than graduate, Endfield left Yale in early 1936, moving to New York and taking classes at the leftist New Theatre League, supporting himself by taking acting jobs and contributing magic acts to new theatre movement revues.

At age 23 he joined the League as a teacher, before spending a year directing an amateur theatre group in Montreal, where he met writers and playwrights including – briefly – Clifford Odets. It was also here that he married actress Fanny Shurack (stage name Osborne).

In 1940, with a baby due, the couple moved to Hollywood, and Endfield looked for work in the studios. His first assignment, a short-lived engagement with Orson Welles’s Mercury Theatre unit at RKO, followed a random meeting with Welles at a Los Angeles magic shop. During this period, Endfield was one of the few people to view the original, uncut version of Welles's The Magnificent Ambersons (1942). Eventually he secured a position with the short subject department at MGM. But his first film, Inflation (1943), a well-regarded propaganda short approved by the Office of War Information, was quickly withdrawn from distribution following criticism from the Chamber of Commerce.^{[iii]} The United States' entry into World War II had made studios very sensitive to criticism.

Endfield remained at MGM until he was called up to a year of military service with the U.S. Army at Fort Crowder in Missouri. After the war he returned to the studio, before writing and directing several low budget Joe Palooka features (based on the comic strip) for Monogram. What he later called his first "auteur effort', The Argyle Secrets (1948), was made after nine days of shooting, from his own short^{1} radio play for the CBS Suspense series. Endfield's career revived in 1950, with the release of two well-received crime features, The Underworld Story and The Sound of Fury (Try and Get Me!).

== Politics and exile ==
In 1951 Endfield found his career derailed as a result of hearings by the House Committee on Un-American Activities. Screenwriter Martin Berkeley named him in September 1951 as known to have been involved with left wing political associations (at the New Theatre League in New York in the late 1930s, and in Hollywood in 1943). Endfield was called to testify and, while he was reluctant to plead the Fifth Amendment before the Committee, he found the option of ‘naming names’, so as to clear himself for further Hollywood film work, to be unacceptable. He made a hurried settlement with his wife, from whom he had separated, and sailed for England on the Queen Mary in December 1951. He slowly re-established his filmmaking career in London.

He later commented:

"The political enthusiasms attributed to me were already years and years dead, but the sole option of informing [was] still repellent. My enjoyable career and its attendant affluence conducted in the unmatchable ambience of as-yet-unpolluted Los Angeles was kaput! And I, physically storm-tossed, a "boat-person", albeit as a passenger on the Queen Mary on a one-way transatlantic trip."^{[i]}

Endfield was 37 when he began his new life in the UK, and it was a struggle to get work both in theatre and film. The British security services took a close interest, and for a time there was a real possibility of him being sent back to the United States. His FBI and Home Office files reveal something of this struggle. Only slowly, as he found film work (and some work in the theatre), did the Board of Trade become more sympathetic, recognising the value to the country (as it slowly emerged from austerity) of the employment and dollar investment that the filmmaker began to attract.^{[ii]}

Endfield was one of a number of American filmmakers with left-wing associations who moved to Europe in the early fifties because of the blacklist (notably Joseph Losey, John Berry, Jules Dassin, and Carl Foreman).^{[iii]} His stay in the UK was gradually extended, and he made a series of low budget films. His association with the producer Benjamin Fisz led to two better funded productions, Hell Drivers (1957) and Sea Fury (1958), for Britain's largest production company, the Rank Organisation; both featured Stanley Baker, who was to appear in six of his films. Filmink called Endfield "one of several blacklisted Americans who brought a great deal of life to the British film industry during this period (e.g. Carl Foreman, Joseph Losey)."

Endfield was eventually issued with a new passport and in 1957 he was given permission to remain permanently in the UK, having remarried in March 1956, to the model, Mo Forshaw.^{[iv]}

Yet Endfield's career remained something of a struggle, and the blacklist still prevented him being considered for international productions, with American finance. It was in 1960, when he was offered the direction of Mysterious Island by Columbia Pictures, that he decided that he needed to clear himself by appearing before the House Committee on Un-American Activities in Washington. Endfield had written to the Committee in August 1958, but it was in March 1960 that he reluctantly made the flight to Washington D.C. to appear before the committee. He there admitted his associations with the Communist Party, and of distancing himself from the Party after the war, such that some left-wing friends saw him as a renegade. At this late stage, with the blacklist beginning to collapse, all of those named were already blacklisted. Yet some of his fellow American exiles were not impressed by his action, which allowed him to direct Mysterious Island (1961), at a time when he and Stanley Baker were working to try and set up an ambitious production of Zulu on location in South Africa.^{[v]}

== Endfield's film work ==
The short period from 1949 to 1951 was one in which Endfield's profile was on the rise. He directed The Underworld Story (1950), a crime story with social overtones (with Dan Duryea, Herbert Marshall and Howard da Silva), that was made for a subsidiary of Monogram Pictures. He followed this up with The Sound of Fury (1950), for the independent company Robert Stillman Productions (distributed by United Artists), at the end of the year. He described both films as ‘nervous A’ pictures, meaning that they had a budget of around $500,000. Their cost was beyond that of a B-picture, but still well short of that of ‘A’ pictures. This was a step up for directors such as Endfield and followed in the tradition of the successful pictures associated with rising producer Stanley Kramer in the late forties, notably Champion (1949) and Home of the Brave (1949). Both the 1950 films, and particularly the second, came to be seen as film noirs, to use the term then being applied by critics to a series of American crime films that were released in France after the war.^{[i]}

The success of The Underworld Story led to the effort by new producer Robert Stillman to set up The Sound of Fury (Try and Get Me!), based on a 1947 novel by Jo Pagano that dealt with a notorious kidnapping and lynching case of 1933. The events, in San Jose, had already loosely inspired Fritz Lang's Fury (1935), with Spencer Tracy. Endfield put heart and soul into the project, which was filmed on location in Phoenix, Arizona, and which starred Lloyd Bridges, Frank Lovejoy, Katherine Ryan and Art Smith. There were disagreements over the script, but the story was a powerful one of a decent, family man (Lovejoy) whose desperation for work leads to an ill-fated, criminal alliance with a psychopath (Bridges). The climax, in which a mob invades a prison where the two criminals are being kept, had a particularly strong impact on critics.

Endfield arranged a private showing of The Sound of Fury for friends and associates. In the audience was the actor Joseph Cotten, who Endfield had got to know well at the Welles unit at RKO. The director recalled Cotten's comment after the showing: ‘Cy, we’ve both grown up in the same country, but I'm telling you, the America you know is not the America that I know.’^{[ii]} To the director this reaction indicated how such a film could be viewed in the febrile atmosphere of the Cold War. The critic Manny Farber also saw the film in these terms, describing it as ‘an ominous snarl at American life.’ Endfield talked to theatre managers who reported that some patrons had complained that the film was ‘un-American’, at a time when Americans were fighting and dying in Korea.^{[iii]}

Early in his time in London Endfield worked without credit for the American producer Hannah Weinstein, directing three pilot episodes for a television series called Colonel March Investigates, with Boris Karloff. His other films were directed anonymously, with another director – Charles de la Tour – often being credited, and being paid to stand by on set. This partly reflected then rules of the film industry union, the Association of Cinematograph Technicians (ACT), as well as the reluctance of American distributors to handle films that carried the names of those blacklisted. Such films included The Limping Man (1953) and Impulse (1955), while for The Master Plan (1955), Endfield was credited as Hugh Raker. The director's credit for The Secret (1955), and Child in the House (1956) was C. Raker Endfield, although the latter film still saw la Tour standing by. There are some resonances of the blacklist experience in The Secret (with Sam Wanamaker) and in Child of the House, the first of Endfield's films with Stanley Baker.

Hell Drivers (1957) was a breakthrough in terms of scale and ambition; it was successful in the UK and has attained a cult reputation. The subject, from a short story by John Kruse, concerned the trucking industry, and the short-haul transport of ballast, by a private company that stokes the ultra-competitive behaviour of its drivers. A publicity still of the time described it as a ‘drama of men who battle for their livelihood in ten-ton trucks.’^{[iv]} Stanley Baker plays the driver (and ex-con) Tom Yately, while the strong cast includes Herbert Lom, Peggy Cummins, William Hartnell, and Wilfred Lawson, together with, in small but significant roles, emerging British actors Sean Connery and Patrick McGoohan.

Endfield wrote at the time of the rationale for the film, and for the Rank film that followed, Sea Fury (1958), seeing both as drawing inspiration from Hollywood dramas of working-class life. The Sunday Times review referred to "a pace and muscular command of violent action uncommon in British cinema", while another critic, referencing Henri-Georges Clouzot's 1953 film The Wages of Fear (Le salaire de la peur), wrote of ‘a British Wages of Fear’. Sea Fury drew on similar aspects of the world of work, in this case following the efforts of men on salvage boats off the coast of Spain; the action sequences attracted particular critical attention.

Yet neither film was successful internationally, and in the late fifties Endfield become discouraged by the lack of opportunities in the industry. Several film projects collapsed, including adaptations of Evelyn Waugh's Scoop, and Mary Webb's Precious Bane, although he did direct Mysterious Island (1961), a studio project that successfully exploited Ray Harryhausen's special effects to tell the Jules Verne story.^{[v]}

For several years the director worked on commercials, while he and Baker engaged in a long struggle to make Zulu (1964), a recreation of the 1879 engagement between four thousand Zulu warriors and a small garrison of British soldiers at Rorke's Drift, in southern Africa. With a script by John Prebble, Endfield and Baker (co-producers of the film) eventually secured financing from Joseph Levine, as well as from Paramount. The resulting film was a huge success in Britain and has remained one of the most popular of British war films.

It was Endfield who took a chance on inexperienced 30-year-old actor Michael Caine to play (opposite Baker) one of the two British officers, and personally engaged the then Zulu chief, Prince Mangosuthu Buthelezi to play Cetshwayo, the King of the Zulus at the time. Caine has long recalled that it took an American to give this working-class actor the chance to play a British officer role.^{[vii]} His acting career never looked back. The resulting film uses the epic scenery of the Drakensberg Mountains and the Royal National Park, establishing the beleaguered colonial garrison and then elegantly depicting the hour-long battle. For all the lack of historical context, and developed characters on the Zulu side, the film avoids jingoism, and presents the British officers as having a final sense of self-disgust at their survival.^{[viii]}

Despite that success, Endfield struggled in the following years, as American financing for British projects became scarcer. His last film as a director was Universal Soldier (1971), with George Lazenby, while he wrote the screenplay (with Anthony Storey) for Zulu Dawn (d. Douglas Hickox, 1979), and a novel with the same title (also 1979).^{[ix]} The science fiction writer Brian Aldiss, who worked on several unrealised projects with the director, made his own comment: ‘I admired Cy. He never had another success like Zulu. But then, how many people could have achieved the sheer organisation and artistry that went into the film?’^{[x]}

== A Polymath ==
Endfield had a range of interests that crossed the traditional ‘two cultures’ of British life.^{[i]} First and foremost, he had a life-long passion for close-up, sleight of hand magic, particularly involving card manipulations. As a youngster in Scranton he gave demonstrations and published tricks for the magic fraternity, while in New York in the late thirties, and in Los Angeles in the forties he designed popular magic acts. When he came to London in the fifties he was in demand, and gave presentations, including at the Magic Circle, while he maintained friendships with other exponents of card magic, including Dai Vernon, as well as with scientists with an interest in card magic and issues of probability. A book of Endfield's card magic was published in Britain in 1955, while in 1959 he appeared on a BBC programme on contemporary magic, along with Vernon and (Tony) Slydini. Endfield maintained a correspondence with science writer Martin Gardner on close-up card magic, and science and pseudo-science, and was encouraging to younger practitioners, for example, Michael Vincent. Science fiction literature was another of his passions.^{[ii]}

Parallel to his film career, Endfield was periodically involved with the theatre. After his time at the New Theatre League in the late thirties he ran a leftist ‘social’ theatre for around a year in Montreal. In the UK he was involved as director of several theatrical performances, the most notable of which was the run, for over a year (1962–63), of Neil Simon's play Come Blow Your Horn, in London's West End.

Endfield was also interested in invention, technology and design, and was often ahead of his time. He designed and patented a portable chess set composed of hand-crafted pieces that could be fitted into silver cylinders. The set was marketed to commemorate the World Championship match between Bobby Fischer of the United States and Boris Spassky of the Soviet Union, in Reykjavik in 1972. In 2021 there was a renewed interest in developing a miniature chess set based on Endfield's design.

Also, in the late 1970s and into the 1980s, Endfield became intensely interested in devising, financing and marketing a hand-held mechanism that was essentially an early form of word processor. He worked with Chris Rainey on the device on which text could be inputted and subsequently connected to a printer. In the early 1980s the finished product, the Microwriter, was sold around the world with (for a time) some success. A related personal organiser led to Endfield and his collaborators receiving a British Design Award in 1990.

== Death ==
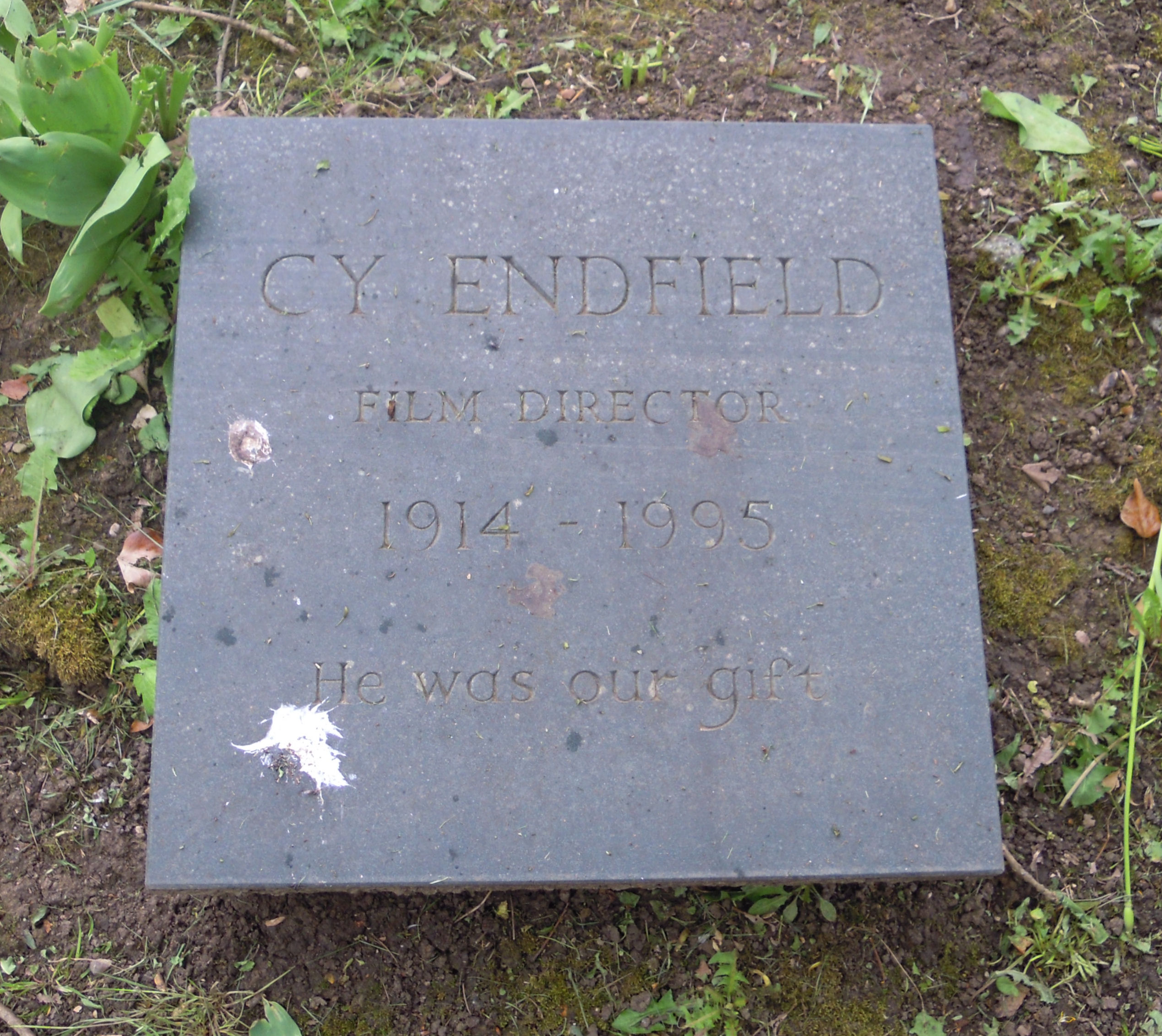
Endfield's grave in Highgate Cemetery

Cy Endfield died in 1995 in Shipston-on-Stour, Warwickshire, England, age 80. He is buried in Highgate Cemetery.

== Reputation and legacy ==
Endfield's first critical success (apart from the studio and trade praise for the largely unseen 1943 short, Inflation) came with the release of The Sound of Fury (Try and Get Me!). The film attracted positive attention, despite its commercial failure. The Saturday Review of Literature (in February 1951) welcomed the low-budget feature that ‘challenges comparison with the million-dollar epics.’ After the film's UK release, Gavin Lambert reviewed it in the British Film Institute (BFI)’s Monthly Film Bulletin. Lambert referred to the film's remarkable ‘characterisation and the handling of the drama’ – ‘at times reaching a complexity rare in films of this type.’ (Lambert, with Lindsay Anderson, had founded the influential post-war British film magazine Sequence.)

Endfield himself wrote a short article in the Film Society magazine Film (1958), in which he discussed his approach to directing.^{[i]}

In 1964 Pierre Rissient, a French critic, cinėaste and sometime producer, drew more attention to the director's work by organizing a partial retrospective of six of Endfield's films at the Cinémathèque française. This included the first French release of The Sound of Fury. While in Paris for this event, Endfield commented about his approach to directing, noting that ‘you don't necessarily have to go to art theatres to find art.’ He revealed his admiration for storyteller directors – he mentioned Fritz Lang and Raoul Walsh - who were able to make some degree of personal comment on the world while still being appreciated by a popular audience.^{[ii]}

Late in his life Endfield referred to the upheavals in his life, and notably the lost opportunities attendant on his unplanned move to the UK. But he had also received critical recognition there: Raymond Durgnat, a highly respected writer on British cinema, wrote positively of Endfield's work in his A Mirror for England (1970). He noted that: "... even if Cy Endfield's Hell Drivers (1957) and Sea Fury (1958) lack the social analysis of his Hollywood The Sound of Fury, their harsh energy is exhilarating and disturbing."

In addition, Thom Andersen, in 1985, first drew attention to a group of post-war film noirs that were particularly sensitive to social and political issues. He listed thirteen examples, released between 1947 and 1951, including films directed by Robert Rossen, Abraham Polonsky, Jules Dassin, John Huston, Joseph Losey and Cy Endfield. Andersen described The Sound of Fury as a ‘remarkable tour de force of action filmmaking’.^{[iii]}

Late in life Endfield gave a long interview to American writer Jonathan Rosenbaum, a film critic who was an early champion of the director's work. Rosenbaum referred to Endfield's "remarkable noir efforts", and wrote of ‘a poetry of thwarted ambitions, dark, social insights, and awesomely orchestrated struggle.’^{[iv]}

Despite ill-health, Endfield accepted an invitation to attend the Telluride Film Festival in Colorado in 1992, where he was awarded the festival's Silver Medallion and was interviewed by National Public Radio's Howie Movshowitz about The Sound of Fury, Zulu and the effect of the blacklist. In 1989 and 1992 Endfield also gave interviews to Brian Neve, talking at length, in particular about his American work and the blacklist.

Since Endfield's death in Shipston-on Stour, in the UK, on April 16, 1995 (aged 80), a number of writers have continued to explore political and other aspects of film noir, and to credit his contribution. James Naremore, in his survey of film noir and its contexts, highlights The Sound of Fury:

"... the film's lynch-mob sequences are profoundly unsettling, and the story as a whole is such a thoroughgoing indictment of capitalism and liberal complacency that it transcends the ameliorative limits of the social problem picture."^{[v]}

Glen Erickson and others have referred to the prescience of The Sound of Fury, with its frightening depiction of populist anger. A book-length treatment of Endfield's life and work was published in 2015. Since then there have been several retrospectives of the director's work, notably at Anthology Film Archives in New York City, the University of Wisconsin-Madison, and the UCLA film & television archive. His later work also received further discussion. Sheldon Hall wrote a major examination of Zulu, a film that was given a 50th anniversary showing in London in 2014.

Critic Nick Pinkerton celebrated the range of Endfield's cinematic achievement in a 2015 piece that concluded:

"He had done a great deal in cinema, but late in life he rued the fact that he hadn't done more – as should we, for there is much evidence here that Cy Endfield still had a few tricks up his sleeve."^{[vii]}

== Retrospectives ==
- Cinematique Francaise, Paris, 1964
- Chicago Film Center, 1992
- Amiens Film Festival, Amiens 2008
- Cinematheque francaise, Paris 2008
- Anthology FilmArchives, New York, 2015
- University of Wisconsin, 2015
- UCLA, 2016

== Filmography ==
=== Short film ===
- Inflation (1943)
- Radio Bugs (1944)
- Tale of a Dog (1944)
- Dancing Romeo (1944)
- Nostradamus IV (1944)
- The Great American Mug (1945)
- Magic on a Stick (1946)
- Our Old Car (1946)

=== Feature film ===
Year	Title	Director	Writer	Producer	Notes
1946	Joe Palooka, Champ	No	Yes	No	
1946	Mr. Hex	No	Yes	Yes	
1946	Gentleman Joe Palooka	Yes	Yes	No	
1947	Stork Bites Man	Yes	Yes	No	
1947	Hard Boiled Mahoney	No	Yes	No	
1948	Sleep, My Love	No	Uncredited	No	
1948	The Argyle Secrets	Yes	Yes	No	author of original radio play
1949	Joe Palooka in the Big Fight	Yes	Yes	No	
1949	Joe Palooka in the Counterpunch	No	Yes	No	
1950	The Underworld Story	Yes	Yes	No	
1950	The Sound of Fury	Yes	Uncredited	No	
1952	Tarzan's Savage Fury	Yes	No	No	
1953	Colonel March Investigates	Yes	No	No	
1953	The Limping Man	Yes	No	No	Credited as "Charles de Lautour"
1954	Impulse	Yes	Yes	No	Credited as "Charles de Lautour"
1955	Crashout	No	Uncredited	No	
1955	The Master Plan	Yes	Yes	No	Credited as "Hugh Raker"
1955	The Secret	Yes	Yes	No	
1956	Child in the House	Yes	Yes	No	
1957	Hell Drivers	Yes	Yes	No	
1957	Curse of the Demon	No	Uncredited	No	Final screenplay
1958	Sea Fury	Yes	Yes	No	
1959	Jet Storm	Yes	Yes	No	
1961	Mysterious Island	Yes	No	No	
1964	Zulu	Yes	Yes	Yes	
1964	Hide and Seek	Yes	No	No	
1965	Sands of the Kalahari	Yes	Yes	Yes	
1969	De Sade	Yes	No	No	
1971	Universal Soldier	Yes	Yes	No	Also actor
1979	Zulu Dawn	No	Yes	No	

=== Television ===
Year	Title	Notes
1956	Colonel March of Scotland Yard	3 episodes
