= Joe Palooka Meets Humphrey =

1950 film by Jean Yarbrough

- Directed by: Jean Yarbrough
- Written by: Henry Blankfort
- Based on: Joe Palooka by Ham Fisher
- Produced by: Hal E. Chester
- Starring: Leon Errol; Joe Kirkwood Jr. Elyse Knox; Robert Coogan; Jerome Cowan
- Cinematography: William Sickner
- Edited by: Otho Lovering
- Production company: Monogram Pictures
- Distributed by: Monogram Pictures
- Release date: February 5, 1950
- Running time: 65 minutes
- Country: United States
- Language: English

Joe Palooka Meets Humphrey is a 1950 film in the Joe Palooka series directed by Jean Yarbrough.

== Plot ==
When their car veers off the road en route to their honeymoon, Joe Palooka and new wife Anne are rescued by a sweet lummox, Humphrey Pennyworth, who has amazing strength. Back at Joe's house, Knobby Walsh, concerned about newspaper reports that Joe intends to retire from boxing, visits and spends the night, causing a rift between Joe and Anne.

A charity fight is arranged in which Joe will raise funds for a boys' club. When his scheduled opponent, Johnson, speaks an insulting remark, Humphrey flattens him. Johnson's shifty manager Belden now wants Humphrey to fight Joe instead, but Humphrey only wants to eat. Belden tells lies about Joe, persuading the gullible Humphrey to step into the ring. Belden's thugs attack Knobby, who has been pretending to be British boxing manager Lord Cecil. Joe's punches barely affect Humphrey, but without having eaten all day, Humphrey becomes dizzy from hunger. Joe defeats him, Belden is arrested and Humphrey's sister Prunella brings him a pie.

== Cast ==
- Leon Errol as Knobby / Lord Cecil
- Joe Kirkwood, Jr. as Joe Palooka
- Elyse Knox as Anne
- Robert Coogan as Humphrey
- Jerome Cowan as Belden
- Joe Besser as Carlton
- Donald MacBride as Mayor

== Reception ==
The Los Angeles Times called the film "an original and outrageous comedy".
