= Jack O'Clubs =

1924 film directed by Robert F. Hill

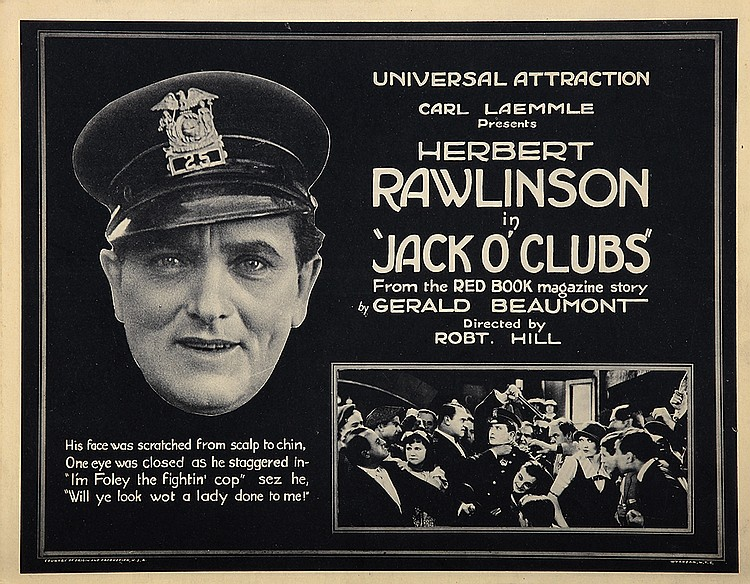
- Lobby card
- Directed by: Robert F. Hill
- Written by: Gerald Beaumont; Rex Taylor; Raymond L. Schrock
- Produced by: Carl Laemmle
- Starring: Herbert Rawlinson; Esther Ralston; Eddie Gribbon
- Cinematography: William Thornley
- Production company: Universal Pictures
- Distributed by: Universal Pictures
- Release date: February 1924
- Running time: 50 minutes
- Country: United States
- Language: Silent (English intertitles)

Jack O'Clubs is a 1924 American silent crime drama film directed by Robert F. Hill and starring Herbert Rawlinson, Esther Ralston, and Eddie Gribbon.

== Plot ==
As described in a film magazine, the dogged determination and big heart of an Irish patrolman prove victorious in his lone battle for love and honor. John Francis Foley (Rawlinson), known as "Jack 0' Clubs," has managed by daring and fistic prowess to gain the respect of the hardened characters of his beat on the East Side of New York. Tillie Miller (Dwyer), a little café singer, attracts him. She is the sweetheart of Spike Kennedy (Gribbon), supreme gang leader, who bears "Jack O' Clubs" a deep, unsatisfied grudge for his successful reform measures to clean up the neighborhood. Spike and Jack are prevented by Captain Dennis Malloy (Girard) of the police district from using their fists to settle their difference of opinion regarding Tillie. The police officer hears Tillie singing one night and is a captive at once. He tries to meet her, but she, thinking he is the betrayer of her sweetheart's pals, repulses him. Later she relents, after a furious quarrel with Spike. Queenie Hatch (Ralston), one of the popular girls of the district, resents Tillie's popularity. Queenie also is in love with Spike, but fails to arouse his interest. This enrages her and she deliberately stages a quarrel with Tillie while the café singer is entertaining her enthusiastic audience. Tillie retaliates for Queenie's insulting remarks and the two girls have a fight, which quickly develops into a general melee. Jack attempts, single-handed, to settle the affray. Surrounded by a gang of hard-hitting ruffians, the policeman raises his club in defense, just as Spike Kennedy is about to blackjack him. Tillie rushes forward and received Jack's blow. In the excitement every one is only too ready to believe the officer struck the girl, which is gang leader Spike's version of the fray. Jack is accused of being her assailant. "Jack 0' Clubs" has no way of proving his innocence and is severely reprimanded by his superiors. For days Tillie hovers on the brink of death. Jack visits Tillie at the hospital and convinces her of his innocence, at the same time winning her love. How he wins back his honor and position with the police force and proves his love for Tillie brings the story to a conclusion.

== Cast ==
- Herbert Rawlinson as John Francis Foley
- Ruth Dwyer as Tillie Miller
- Eddie Gribbon as Spike Kennedy
- Esther Ralston as Queenie Hatch
- Joseph W. Girard as Capt. Dennis Malloy
- Florence Lee as Mrs. Miller
- Johnny Fox as Toto
- Noel Stewart as Otto

== Preservation ==
With no prints of Jack O'Clubs located in any film archives, it is a lost film.

== Bibliography ==
- Munden, Kenneth White. The American Film Institute Catalog of Motion Pictures Produced in the United States, Part 1. University of California Press, 1997.
