= Joe Palooka in Fighting Mad =

1948 film

- Directed by: Reginald LeBorg
- Screenplay by: Bernard D. Shamberg; Ralph S. Lewis; John Bright; Monte Collins
- Based on: Joe Palooka by Ham Fisher
- Produced by: Hal E. Chester; Bernard W. Burton
- Starring: Leon Errol; Joe Kirkwood, Jr. Elyse Knox
- Cinematography: William A. Sickner
- Edited by: Roy V. Livingston
- Music by: Edward J. Kay
- Production company: Monogram Pictures
- Distributed by: Monogram Pictures
- Release date: February 7, 1948
- Running time: 74 minuters
- Country: United States
- Language: English

Joe Palooka in Fighting Mad is a 1948 American comedy film directed by Reginald LeBorg and starring Leon Errol, Joe Kirkwood, Jr. and Elyse Knox. It was part of the Joe Palooka series, produced and distributed by Monogram Pictures.

== Plot ==
Blinded during a fight, Joe Palooka is advised to take at least a year off from boxing. His manager Knobby Walsh finds another fighter, but when gangsters cause him trouble, Joe volunteers to climb back into the ring, against his doctor's advice.

== Cast ==
- Joe Kirkwood Jr. as Joe Palooka
- Leon Errol as Knobby
- Elyse Knox as Anne
- Patricia Dane as Iris March
- John Hubbard as Charles Kennedy
- Wally Vernon as Archie Stone
- Horace McMahon as Truck Driver
- Eddie Gribbon as Scranton
- Sarah Padden as Mom Palooka
- Herb Vigran as Reporter
- Dewey Robinson as Fighter
- Emil Sitka as Photographer
- Cy Kendall as Commissioner R.E. Carfter
- Frank Mayo as Detective (uncredited)

== Bibliography ==
- Drew, Bernard A. Motion Picture Series and Sequels: A Reference Guide. Routledge, 2013.
