= Smart Woman (1948 film) =

1948 romantic drama film

- Directed by: Edward A. Blatt
- Written by: Adela Rogers St. Johns (adaptation); Alvah Bessie; Lou Morheim; Herbert H. Margolis
- Story by: Leon Gutterman; Edwin V. Westrade
- Produced by: Hal E. Chester
- Starring: Brian Aherne; Constance Bennett; Barry Sullivan
- Cinematography: Stanley Cortez
- Edited by: Frank Gross
- Music by: C. Bakaleinikoff
- Production company: Constance Bennett Productions
- Distributed by: Allied Artists
- Release date: April 30, 1948
- Running time: 93 minutes
- Country: United States
- Language: English

Smart Woman is a 1948 American romantic drama film directed by Edward A. Blatt and starring Brian Aherne, Constance Bennett, and Barry Sullivan.

== Plot ==
When a grand jury becomes dissatisfied with the efforts of District Attorney Bradley Wayne (Otto Kruger), it requests a special prosecutor, Robert Larrimore (Brian Aherne).

Wayne, who is in league with crime boss Frank McCoy (Barry Sullivan), assigns Larrimore the difficult Johnson case. McCoy blackmails the best defense lawyer around, Paula Rogers (Constance Bennett), into defending Johnson. When Larrimore's assistant, Sam Corkle (James Gleason), tracks down a crucial witness intimidated into hiding, McCoy tells Rogers to plead her client guilty.

Afterward, Larrimore begins dating Rogers. The couple make it into the newspapers, in between stories of Larrimore's successes against the crime syndicate.

Larrimore's investigation points to a Dr. Jasper, the one man who can identify the shadowy head of the syndicate. When Jasper goes into hiding from both sides, McCoy pressures Rogers to spy on her boyfriend. She finds a telegram with valuable information as to Jasper's whereabouts, but she does not pass it along to the gangster.

Meanwhile, Larrimore gives Wayne, the crooked district attorney, an ultimatum: either betray his partner in crime or face an indictment in 24 hours. Larrimore is to meet Dr. Jasper at the political party headquarters but finds Jasper's body in the printing press room. Shortly after, Larrimore is attacked by thugs sent by Wayne but the attack is foiled when a passerby screams. Wayne summons McCoy to his home and in the library shows him the gun used to kill Jasper. He offers McCoy $100,000 to put his fingerprints on it and flee the country for a while, just until the pressure subsides. When McCoy refuses, Wayne grabs the gun and states he can shoot McCoy and plead self-defense. In the ensuing struggle, the gun goes off, killing Wayne. Mrs. Wayne (Selena Royle), eavesdropping from outside the room, faints; her daughter Patty enters the library and sees that her father has been killed. McCoy is arrested and charged with first degree murder.

Rogers very reluctantly defends McCoy, knowing him to be incapable of murder (if little else). The trial goes badly. Mrs. Wayne perjures herself on the witness stand to protect the family's reputation, and states that McCoy gunned down her husband in cold blood. As a desperate last resort, Rogers puts herself on the stand as a character witness. She reveals that she was once married to the defendant and concealed the fact to protect their son Rusty. She intimates that Mrs. Wayne, likewise, concealed what really happened in the library to protect her daughter Patty from learning that her father was corrupt. Larrimore sees that Mrs. Wayne is visibly affected by the testimony, so he goes to see her later and has her re-enact the crime. He discovers she did not have her glasses on that night and, as a result, could not have seen what happened. He gets her to sign a statement to that effect. Larrimore then overcomes Rogers' desire to break up with him to shield him from the scandal, and the couple reconcile.

== Cast ==
- Brian Aherne as Robert Larrimore
- Constance Bennett as Paula Rogers
- Barry Sullivan as Frank McCoy
- Michael O'Shea as Johnny Simons
- James Gleason as Sam Corkle
- Otto Kruger as District Attorney Bradley Wayne
- Isobel Elsom as Mrs. Rogers
- Richard Lyon as Rusty Rogers
- Selena Royle as Mrs. Wayne
- Taylor Holmes as Dr. Jasper
- John Litel as Clark
- Nita Hunter as Patty Wayne
