= Joe Palooka in Winner Take All =

1947 film directed by Reginald LeBorg

- Directed by: Reginald LeBorg
- Screenplay by: Stanley Rubin; Monte Collins
- Based on: Joe Palooka by Ham Fisher
- Produced by: Hal E. Chester; Bernard W. Burton
- Starring: Joe Kirkwood, Jr. Elyse Knox; Mary Beth Hughes
- Cinematography: William A. Sickner
- Edited by: Otho Lovering
- Music by: Edward J. Kay
- Production company: Monogram Pictures
- Distributed by: Monogram Pictures
- Release date: September 19, 1948
- Running time: 64 minuters
- Country: United States
- Language: English

Joe Palooka in Winner Take All is a 1948 American comedy film directed by Reginald LeBorg and starring Joe Kirkwood, Jr., Elyse Knox, William Frawley and Mary Beth Hughes. It was part of the Joe Palooka series produced by Monogram Pictures

== Cast ==
- Joe Kirkwood, Jr. as Joe Palooka
- Elyse Knox as Anne Howe
- William Frawley as Knobby Walsh
- Stanley Clements as Tommy
- John Shelton as Greg Tanner
- Mary Beth Hughes as Millie
- Sheldon Leonard as Hermon
- Frank Jenks as Louie
- Lyle Talbot as Henderson
- Eddie Gribbon as Canvasback
- Wally Vernon as Taxi Driver
- Chester Clute as Doniger
- Douglas Fowley as Reporter
- Stanley Prager as Reporter
- Tom Kennedy as Lefty
- Gertrude Astor as Mrs. Howard
