= Gentleman Joe Palooka =

1946 film by Cy Endfield

- Directed by: Cy Endfield
- Screenplay by: Cy Endfield; Hal E. Chester
- Based on: Joe Palooka by Ham Fisher
- Produced by: Hal E. Chester
- Starring: Joe Kirkwood, Jr. Leon Errol; Elyse Knox
- Cinematography: William A. Sickner
- Edited by: Ralph Dixon
- Music by: Edward J. Kay
- Production company: Monogram Pictures
- Distributed by: Monogram Pictures
- Release date: October 5, 1946
- Running time: 72 minutes
- Country: United States
- Language: English

Gentleman Joe Palooka is a 1946 American comedy action film directed by Cy Endfield and starring Joe Kirkwood, Jr., Leon Errol and Elyse Knox. It was the second of the Joe Palooka series which was made by Monogram Pictures.

== Plot ==
The prizefighter Joe Palooka's popularity soars after his manager, Knobby Walsh, explains to reporters how "clean living" is responsible for Joe's success. The public is pleased with a hero who believes in drinking milk.

Joe's rich and unscrupulous Uncle Charlie sees a way to capitalize on Joe's good fortune. He schemes to make a land purchase, trading on Joe's good name, then blackmails Joe and Knobby once they figure out how they're being used. Joe's sweetheart Anne Howe tries to intervene as a legislative investigation of the land swindle begins, and Joe outfoxes thugs employed by Charlie to get to the hearings just in time and clear his name.

== Cast ==
- Leon Errol as Knobby
- Joe Kirkwood, Jr. as Joe Palooka
- Elyse Knox as Anne
- Lionel Stander as Harry
- Guy Kibbee as Charlie
- H.B. Warner as Sen. McCarden
- Stanley Prager as Rapadsky
- Warren Hymer as Louie - Sparring Partner
- Richard Lane as Phillips
- Cliff Nazarro as First Character
- Fritz Feld as Club Steward
- Sarah Padden as Mom Palooka
- Louis Jean Heydt as Chairman
- Freddie Steele as Freddie Steele
- Tom Harmon as Tommy Harmon
- Roy Atwell as Senator Sam H. Smiley
- Ian Wolfe as Editor W.W. Dwight
- Sam McDaniel as Smoky - Second
- Eddie Gribbon as Ziggy - Sparring Partner
- Marie Blake as Maid
- Jack Roper as Waldo - Sparring Partner
- Roger Daniel as Steve Palooka
- Dick Fishell as Dick Fishell - Sportswriter

== Bibliography ==
- Vogel, Michelle. Lupe Velez: The Life and Career of Hollywood's "Mexican Spitfire". McFarland, 2012.
