= Elyse Knox =

American actress (1917–2012)

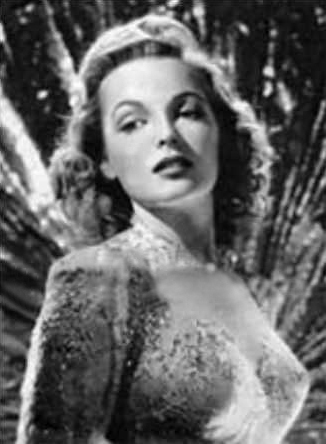
- Knox in 1943
- Born: Elsie M. Kornbrath; December 14, 1917; Hartford, Connecticut, U.S.
- Died: February 16, 2012 (aged 94); Los Angeles, California, U.S.
- Education: Traphagen School of Fashion
- Occupations: Actress, model, fashion designer
- Years active: 1937–1949
- Spouses: Paul Hesse (m. 1942; div. 1943) Tom Harmon (m. 1944; died 1990)
- Children: Kristin Nelson; Kelly Harmon; Mark Harmon

Elyse Knox (born Elsie M. Kornbrath, December 14, 1917 – February 16, 2012) was an American actress, model, and fashion designer. She was the mother of actor Mark Harmon.

== Early life ==
Knox was born in Hartford, Connecticut, the daughter of Austrian immigrants Hermine Sophie (née Muck) and Frederick Kornbrath. She had a brother, Fred.

She attended Hartford Public High School, graduating in 1936, and studied at the Traphagen School of Fashion in Manhattan, New York.

== Career ==
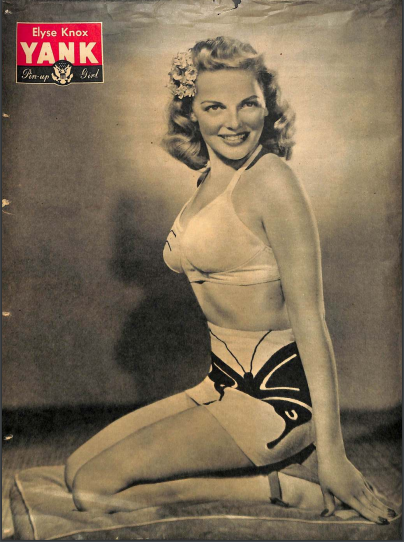
Pin-up photo of Knox for Yank, the Army Weekly in 1945

She was signed to a movie contract (as Elsie M. Kornbrath) by 20th Century-Fox in November 1939, and played incidental roles for one year. Fox dropped her option and she was signed by comedy producer Hal Roach, who featured her in four films. After two minor features (a Roy Rogers western and an RKO comedy), she found a home at Universal, appearing in 11 films as a featured ingenue. She had a leading role with Lon Chaney Jr. in The Mummy's Tomb, one of the series of Mummy horror films made by Universal Studios. That year she was also in the Abbott and Costello comedy Hit The Ice (1942). She appeared as herself in the Universal Studios 1944 production Follow the Boys, one of the World War II morale-booster films made both for the soldiers serving overseas and civilians at home. Knox also was a pin-up girl during the war, appearing in such magazines as Yank, a weekly published and distributed by the United States military.

In late 1945, Knox was signed by Monogram Pictures to portray Anne Howe, the love interest of fictional boxer Joe Palooka in Joe Palooka, Champ. Based on the very popular comic strip, the instant success of the May 1946 film led to Knox appearing in another five Joe Palooka productions. After acting in 39 films, Knox retired in 1949 following her performance in the musical film There's a Girl in My Heart.

== Personal life ==
On February 21, 1942, Knox married commercial photographer Paul Hesse in Coronado, California.

Following her divorce and Tom Harmon's return from World War II (during which he survived two plane crashes and being lost in the jungle), she and Harmon married in 1944. Her wedding dress was made of silk from the parachute Harmon used when bailing out of his plane. After Harmon's demobilization, they settled in the Los Angeles area.

=== Children ===
The couple had three children: Kristin, Kelly, and Mark. Kristin became an actress and painter, who at 17 married recording artist Ricky Nelson and gave birth to four children: Tracy, twins Gunnar and Matthew, and Sam. Kelly, a model turned interior designer, was once married to automaker John DeLorean, and has two daughters and a son and two other stepchildren. Mark played quarterback at UCLA, became an actor, and has two sons with wife Pam Dawber.

== Death ==
On February 16, 2012, Knox died at her home in Los Angeles at age 94.

== Filmography ==
Year	Title	Role	Notes
1937	Wake Up and Live	Nurse	uncredited
1940	Lillian Russell	Lillian Russell's Sister	performer: "Brighten the Corner Where You Are"
1940	Youth Will Be Served	Pamela	
1940	Yesterday's Heroes	Undetermined role	uncredited
1940	Girl from Avenue A	Angela	
1940	Girl in 313	Judith Wilson	
1940	Star Dust	Girl	uncredited
1940	Free, Blonde and 21	Marjorie	
1941	Miss Polly	Barbara Snodgrass	
1941	All-American Co-Ed	Co-ed	uncredited
1941	Tanks a Million	Jeannie	
1941	Sheriff of Tombstone	Mary Carson	
1941	Footlight Fever	Eileen Drake	
1942	Arabian Nights	Duenna	uncredited
1942	The Mummy's Tomb	Isobel Evans	
1942	Top Sergeant	Helen Gray	
1942	Hay Foot	Betty Barkley	
1943	Hi'ya, Sailor	Pat Rogers	
1943	So's Your Uncle	Patricia Williams	
1943	Hit the Ice	Nurse Peggy Osborne	
1943	Mister Big	Alice Taswell	
1943	Keep 'Em Slugging	Suzanne	
1943	Don Winslow of the Coast Guard	Mercedes Colby	
1944	Army Wives	Jerry Van Dyke	
1944	A WAVE, a WAC and a Marine	Marian	
1944	Moonlight and Cactus	Louise Ferguson	
1944	Follow the Boys	Herself	
1946	Sweetheart of Sigma Chi	Betty Allen	
1946	Gentleman Joe Palooka	Anne Howe	
1946	Joe Palooka, Champ	Anne Howe	
1947	Linda, Be Good	Linda Prentiss	
1947	Joe Palooka in the Knockout	Anne Howe	
1947	Black Gold	Ruth Frazer	
1948	Joe Palooka in Winner Take All	Anne Howe	
1948	I Wouldn't Be in Your Shoes	Ann Quinn	
1948	Joe Palooka in Fighting Mad	Anne Howe	
1949	There's a Girl in My Heart	Claire Adamson	
1949	Joe Palooka in the Counterpunch	Anne Howe	
1949	Forgotten Women	Kate Allison	
1953	I Was a Burlesque Queen	Linda Prentiss	archive footage
1999	Mummy Dearest: A Horror Tradition Unearthed	Isobel Evans	archive footage
