= Joe Palooka in Triple Cross =

1951 film directed by Reginald LeBorg

- Theatrical poster
- Directed by: Reginald LeBorg
- Screenplay by: Jan Jeffery
- Story by: B.F. Melzer
- Based on: Joe Palooka by Ham Fisher
- Produced by: Hal E. Chester
- Starring: Joe Kirkwood, Jr. James Gleason; Cathy Downs; John Emery; Steve Brodie
- Cinematography: William A. Sickner
- Music by: Darrell Calker
- Production company: Monogram Pictures
- Distributed by: United Artists
- Release date: September 11, 1951 (Los Angeles)
- Running time: 60 minutes
- Country: United States
- Language: English

Joe Palooka in Triple Cross is a 1951 American film in the Joe Palooka series. The film was directed by Reginald LeBorg and stars Joe Kirkwood Jr. in the title role.

== Plot ==
After championship boxer Joe Palooka, his wife Anne and trainer Knobby stop for gas, they agree to take three hitchhikers whom they later discover are fugitives. Their leader is known as the Professor and his top henchman is Dutch, who is disguised as a woman.

While holding Ann hostage, the Professor orders Joe to throw his next fight while Knobby places a $100,000 bet on his foe. Dutch, carrying a gun, sits ringside, again dressed as a woman, to ensure that Joe follows his orders.

Knocked from the ring, Joe lands at Dutch's feet and exposes his true identity. Joe jumps back into the ring and flattens his opponent, retaining his title.

== Cast ==
- Joe Kirkwood Jr. as Joe Palooka
- Cathy Downs as Anne
- James Gleason as Knobby
- John Emery as the Professor
- Steve Brodie as Dutch

== Release ==
The film opened in Los Angeles at Loew's State Theatre on September 11, 1951 as the second feature to Angels in the Outfield.

== Reception ==
Film historian Wheeler W. Dixon calls the film "a credible, if minor addition" to the Joe Palooka film series.

Director Reginald LeBorg, on completing Joe Palooka and the Triple Cross, his final Joe Palooka film, said: "[I]t was becoming almost as much of a trap as the horror movies."
