= Joe Palooka in Humphrey Takes a Chance =

1950 film by Jean Yarbrough

- Directed by: Jean Yarbrough
- Written by: Jeff Anjan
- Based on: Joe Palooka by Ham Fisher
- Produced by: Hal E. Chester
- Starring: Leon Errol; Joe Kirkwood Jr. Lois Collier; Robert Coogan
- Cinematography: William Sickner
- Edited by: Otho Lovering
- Production company: Monogram Pictures
- Distributed by: Monogram Pictures
- Release date: June 4, 1950
- Running time: 62 minutes
- Country: United States
- Language: English

Joe Palooka in Humphrey Takes a Chance is a 1950 American film directed by Jean Yarbrough, part of the Joe Palooka series.

== Plot ==
Knobby Walsh manages the champ, but unless he agrees to promoter Gordon Rogers' demand for 30 percent of the profits, Rogers will prevent Joe Palooka from fighting again.

Knobby is irate and claims that he arrange a fight for Joe anywhere in the world, even in Wokkington Falls, where the sweet oaf Humphrey Pennyworth still lives. Joe and his wife Anne are glad to go visit their old friend Humphrey, but complications occur when Rogers bribes the mayor and sheriff to frame Knobby and Humphrey on false charges. Joe is eventually able to clear both and save the day.

== Cast ==
- Leon Errol as Knobby
- Joe Kirkwood, Jr. as Joe Palooka
- Lois Collier as Anne
- Robert Coogan as Humphrey
- Mary Happy as Mary
- Tom Neal as Rogers
- Andrew Tombes as Grogan
