= Joe Kirkwood Jr. =

Australian-American actor and professional golfer

- Born: Reginald Thomas Kirkwood; 30 May 1920; Melbourne, Australia
- Died: 7 September 2006 (aged 86); Hesperia, California, U.S.
- Occupations: Professional golfer, actor, reporter, television host
- Years active: 1940–1961
- Spouses: Cathy Downs (m. 1949; div. 1955) Joyce Woltz (m. 1962)
- Father: Joe Kirkwood Sr.

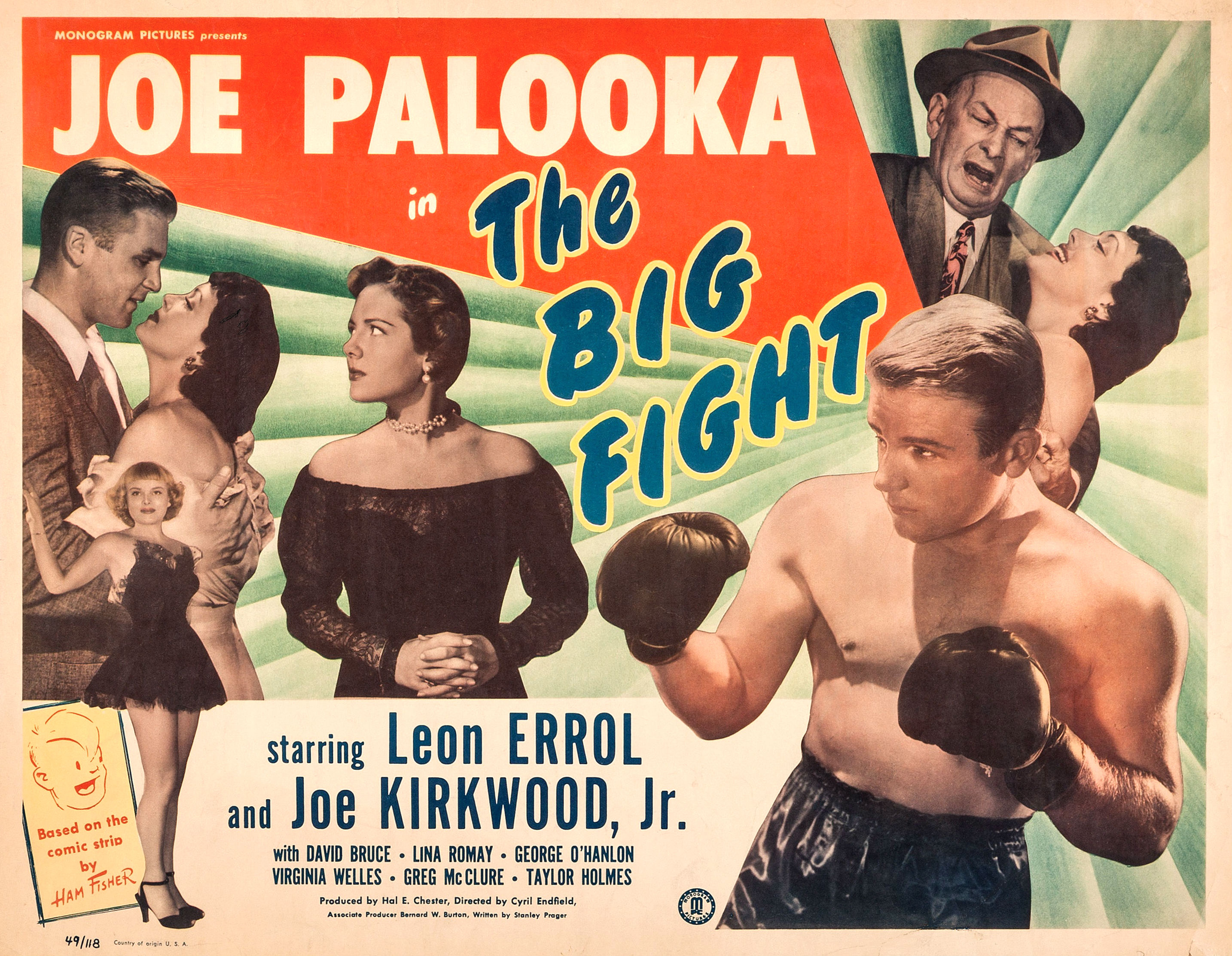
Lobby card with Joe Kirkwood Jr. as the boxer Joe Palooka

Reginald Thomas Kirkwood (30 May 1920 – 7 September 2006), better known as Joe Kirkwood Jr., was a professional golfer on the PGA Tour and a film actor. He started going by the name Joe Jr. in the late 1930s.

== Biography ==
Kirkwood was born in Melbourne, Australia. His father, Joe Kirkwood Sr., was a golf pro acknowledged as having put Australian golf on the world map.

He moved with his family to the United States at age three and often accompanied his father to his golf exhibitions. Kirkwood Jr. attended the Gordon Military Institute in Barnesville, Georgia, where he played sports, including golf. He relocated to Daytona Beach with his mother and further developed his golfing talent. In 1939, when his father accepted the position of head professional at the Huntingdon Valley Country Club in Philadelphia, he joined him as one of his assistants. He stayed at Huntingdon Valley for only one year, then became assistant pro at the Capital City Country Club in Atlanta and, shortly after, at the Terra Mariae Golf Club in Baltimore, now The Country Club of Maryland.

in 1948, father and son both made the cut at the U.S. Open, the first father-and-son, father and son both made the cut at the U.S. Open, the first father and son duo to do so (a record they held until 2004). When the younger Kirkwood won the 1949 Philadelphia Inquirer Open, they became the third father and son winners in the history of the PGA Tour. Kirkwood Jr. also won the Ozark Open in 1950 and defeated Sam Snead to win the 1951 Blue Ribbon Open in Milwaukee, Wisconsin.

Kirkwood served in both the U.S. Army and the Royal Canadian Air Force during World War II but was medically discharged from both services for asthma and high blood pressure that he suffered from since childhood. In 1945, Kirkwood was invited by Monogram Pictures to test for the role of boxer Joe Palooka, a popular comic book character. He got the part and starred in Joe Palooka, Champ (1946) as well as ten additional Joe Palooka films through 1951. Kirkwood returned to the role in the 1954 television series The Joe Palooka Story.

In the late 1950s, Kirkwood, who has a star on the Hollywood Walk of Fame at 1620 Vine Street, was one of the reporters on the NBC Radio program Monitor. He also hosted a show, "Let's Play Golf", on Los Angeles station KHJ-TV.

Kirkwood and his wife, Joyce Woltz, owned bowling centers in Studio City, Los Angeles and Porterville, California, and owned property in Princeville, Hawaii.

== Filmography ==
Year	Title	Role	Notes
1946	Joe Palooka, Champ	Joe Palooka	
1946	Night and Day	Classmate	Uncredited
1946	Gentleman Joe Palooka	Joe Palooka	
1947	Joe Palooka in the Knockout	Joe Palooka	
1947	Joe Palooka in Fighting Mad	Joe Palooka	
1948	Joe Palooka in Winner Take All	Joe Palooka	
1948	Joe Palooka in the Big Fight	Joe Palooka	
1949	Joe Palooka in the Counterpunch	Joe Palooka	
1950	Joe Palooka Meets Humphrey	Joe Palooka	
1950	Joe Palooka in Humphrey Takes a Chance	Joe Palooka	
1950	Joe Palooka in the Squared Circle	Joe Palooka	
1951	Joe Palooka in Triple Cross	Joe Palooka	
1961	The Marriage-Go-Round	Henry 'Doc' Granger	(final film role)

== Personal life ==
Kirkwood married Joyce Woltz in 1962. His first marriage, to Cathy Downs, lasted from 1949 until their divorce in 1955. Downs and Kirkwood starred together in The Joe Palooka Story TV series from 1954 to 1955. When the series went off air, Downs filed for divorce claiming abandonment – that he (Kirkwood) preferred golf over her. She added, "I tried golf for his sake, but he just made fun of me."

Kirkwood died 7 September 2006, in Hesperia, California.

== Professional wins (3) ==
=== PGA Tour wins (2) ===
No.	Date	Tournament	Winning score	Margin of victory	Runner-up	Ref
1	22 May 1949	Philadelphia Inquirer Open	−12 (68-66-68-74=276)	4 strokes	(United States) Johnny Palmer	
2	22 Jul 1951	Blue Ribbon Open	−13 (72-66-69-64=271)	2 strokes	(United States) Sam Snead	

=== Other wins (1) ===
- 1950 Ozark Open
