= Joe Palooka in the Squared Circle =

1950 film by Reginald LeBorg

- Theatrical poster
- Directed by: Reginald LeBorg
- Screenplay by: Jan Jeffery
- Story by: B.F. Melzer
- Based on: Joe Palooka by Ham Fisher
- Produced by: Hal E. Chester
- Starring: Joe Kirkwood, Jr. James Gleason; Lois Hall; Edgar Barrier
- Cinematography: Marcel Le Picard
- Edited by: Otho Lovering
- Music by: Edward J. Kay
- Production company: Monogram Pictures
- Distributed by: United Artists
- Release date: 1950
- Running time: 63 minutes
- Country: United States
- Language: English

Joe Palooka in the Squared Circle is a 1950 American film in the Joe Palooka series.
