= Hal E. Chester =

American actor (1921–2012)

- Born: Harold Ribotsky; March 6, 1921; Brooklyn, New York, US
- Died: March 25, 2012 (aged 91); London, UK
- Occupations: Film producer, writer, director, actor
- Years active: 1935–2003
- Spouse: Virginia Wetherly (m. 1948; died 1980)
- Children: 3

Hal E. Chester (born Harold Ribotsky; March 6, 1921 – March 25, 2012) was an American film producer, writer, director and actor. The correct spelling of his name was Repatsky.

== Early life and career ==
Born in Brooklyn, New York City, he was the youngest of seven children born to affluent Polish-Jewish immigrants; his father was a property developer. After the Wall Street crash of 1929, he took up work as a magician's assistant to help the family finances. He was a twin and his twin sisters name was Harriet.

Originally credited as "Hally Chester" in theater productions (taking the surname of his step-mother), he appeared in the premiere production of Dead End by Sidney Kingsley on Broadway at the age of 14. Playing the part of Dippy, one of the gang of kids soon known as The Dead End Kids, he toured in this play for 22 weeks before accepting an offer to appear in the sequel to the film version (Crime School (1938) for Warner Bros), which had Humphrey Bogart cast in one of the leading roles. As a teen actor, his most regular work was with the Little Tough Guys series for Universal, appearing also in Juvenile Court (1938) for Columbia, in which Rita Hayworth appears, and the East Side Kids for Monogram Pictures. His last appearance in this series was in Sea Raiders (1941).

Hal E. Chester, as he was now known, managed to convince Monogram to place him on contract as a producer in 1945. Meanwhile, he entered into an agreement with comic strip writer-cartoonist Ham Fisher, creator of the Joe Palooka comic strip cartoon character. Between 1946 and 1951, Chester, as producer, was responsible for a series of what became eleven Joe Palooka movies starring Joe Kirkwood, Jr beginning with Joe Palooka, Champ (1946).

He also produced Smart Woman (1948), The Underworld Story (1950), The Highwayman (1951), and Models Inc (1952). Working with stop-motion animator Ray Harryhausen, he produced The Beast from 20,000 Fathoms (1953), based on a Ray Bradbury story, in which a monster, created by the effects of atomic bomb tests terrorises Manhattan. From a budget of $250,000, its rentals totaled $5 million. Crashout (1955), a film about convicts on the run, followed. He co-wrote and produced The Bold and the Brave (1956) starring Nicole Maurey and Mickey Rooney, which led to Academy Award nominations for Rooney and the screenplay writer.

== British career ==
After sailing to Britain on The Liberte in 1955 with his wife Virginia (née Wetherly) and two young sons, he was able to take advantage of tax laws intended to encourage international co-productions. The couple, who had married in 1948, soon had a third son soon afterwards. The family adapted so well to British life that they set up a permanent home in London, where Chester lived until he died. He produced The Weapon (1956) for Republic Pictures in a co-production deal. He co-wrote the screenplay and produced Night of the Demon (1957), which according to Martin Scorsese is "one of the scariest films ever made". Starring Dana Andrews and Peggy Cummins, it was directed by Jacques Tourneur. He followed it with The Two Headed Spy (1958) and School for Scoundrels (1960) with Terry-Thomas, Ian Carmichael, Alastair Sim and Janette Scott. This comedy, derived loosely from the books of Stephen Potter was a box-office success, but also the last hit of Chester's career.

Chester later produced His and Hers (1961), The Comedy Man (1964) and, along with Peter Stone and Frank Tarloff, co-wrote the screenplay for Father Goose (1964) starring Cary Grant. The Double Man (1967), a cold-war spy thriller, features Yul Brynner and Britt Ekland in the leads while The Secret War of Harry Frigg (1968) stars Paul Newman. Chester's last film as producer was Take A Girl Like You (1970) directed by Jonathan Miller. It was based on the Kingsley Amis novel, was adapted by George Melly, and stars Hayley Mills and Oliver Reed. For the remake of School for Scoundrels (2006) Chester was credited as an executive producer.

Chester's second son died in a car accident in 1978, as did his wife in 1980.

In 2003, Chester suffered a stroke which left him severely incapacitated. He died in London on March 25, 2012.

== Filmography ==
Year	Title	Role	Notes
1938	Crime School	Boy	Uncredited
1938	Little Tough Guy	Dopey	
1938	Personal Secretary	Newsboy	Uncredited
1938	Juvenile Court	Lefty	
1938	Little Tough Guys in Society	Murphy	
1938	Newsboys' Home	Murphy	
1939	Off the Record	Reform School Inmate	Uncredited
1939	Code of the Streets	Murph	
1939	When Tomorrow Comes	Newsboy	Uncredited
1939	The Witness Vanishes	Copy Boy	Uncredited
1939	Call a Messenger	Murph	
1940	East Side Kids	Fred 'Dutch' Kuhn	
1940	You're Not So Tough	Second Newsboy	Uncredited
1940	Boys of the City	Buster	
1940	Junior G-Men	Murph	Uncredited
1941	Hit the Road	Trusty	
1941	Mob Town	Boy	Uncredited
1941	Sea Raiders	Swab	Serial (final film role)
