= List of films based on comic strips =

This is a list of films based on English-language comic strips and characters first appearing in them, including single panel gag cartoons appearing in newspapers, magazines, and webcomics. The practice of creating films based on comic strips dates back to the early years of film itself. In recent years, due to advances in special effects, big budget films based on comic books have become more common.

== Feature films ==
=== A ===
- Based on The Addams Family:
  - Halloween with the New Addams Family (1977, TV film)
  - The Addams Family (1991)
  - Addams Family Values (1993)
  - Addams Family Reunion (1998)
  - The Addams Family (2019)
  - The Addams Family 2 (2021)
- Based on Air Hawk and the Flying Doctors (Australia):
  - Airhawk (1981, TV film)
- Based on Accident Man (comic strip).
  - Accident Man (2018, direct-to-video)
  - Accident Man: Hitman's Holiday (2022, direct-to-video)

=== B ===
- Based on Barney Google and Snuffy Smith:
  - Private Snuffy Smith (1942)
  - Hillbilly Blitzkrieg (1942)
- Based on Blondie:
  - Blondie (1938)
  - Blondie Meets the Boss (1939)
  - Blondie Takes a Vacation (1939)
  - Blondie Brings Up Baby (1939)
  - Blondie on a Budget (1940)
  - Blondie Has Servant Trouble (1940)
  - Blondie Plays Cupid (1940)
  - Blondie Goes Latin (1941)
  - Blondie in Society (1941)
  - Blondie Goes to College (1942)
  - Blondie's Blessed Event (1942)
  - Blondie for Victory (1942)
  - It's a Great Life (1943)
  - Footlight Glamour (1943)
  - Leave It to Blondie (1945)
  - Life with Blondie (1945)
  - Blondie's Lucky Day (1946)
  - Blondie Knows Best (1946)
  - Blondie's Big Moment (1947)
  - Blondie's Holiday (1947)
  - Blondie in the Dough (1947)
  - Blondie's Anniversary (1947)
  - Blondie's Reward (1948)
  - Blondie's Secret (1948)
  - Blondie's Big Deal (1949)
  - Blondie Hits the Jackpot (1949)
  - Blondie's Hero (1950)
  - Beware of Blondie (1950)
- Based on Brenda Starr, Reporter:
  - Brenda Starr (1976, TV film)
  - Brenda Starr (1989)
- Based on Bringing Up Father:
  - Bringing Up Father (1928)
  - Vihtori ja Klaara (1939, Finland)
  - Bringing Up Father (1946)
  - Jiggs and Maggie in Society (1948)
  - Jiggs and Maggie in Court (1948)
  - Jiggs and Maggie in Jackpot Jitters (1949)
  - Jiggs and Maggie Out West (1950)

=== C ===
- Based on Colonel Blimp (UK):
  - The Life and Death of Colonel Blimp (1943)

=== D ===
- Based on Dennis the Menace:
  - Dennis the Menace: Dinosaur Hunter (1987, TV film)
  - Dennis the Menace (1993)
  - Dennis the Menace Strikes Again (1998, direct-to-video)
  - Dennis the Menace: Cruise Control (2002, TV film)
  - A Dennis the Menace Christmas (2007, direct-to-video)
- Based on Dick Tracy:
  - Dick Tracy (AKA Dick Tracy, Detective) (1945)
  - Dick Tracy vs. Cueball (1946)
  - Dick Tracy's Dilemma (1947)
  - Dick Tracy Meets Gruesome (1947)
  - Dick Tracy (1990)
- Based on Dondi:
  - Dondi (1961)

=== E ===
- Based on Ella Cinders:
  - Ella Cinders (1926)

=== F ===
- Based on Fatty Finn (Australia):
  - The Kid Stakes (1927)
  - Fatty Finn (1980)
- Based on Feiffer (in The Village Voice):
  - Bernard and Huey (2017)
- Based on Flash Gordon:
  - Flash Gordon (1936)
  - Flash Gordon (1980)
  - Flash Gordon: The Greatest Adventure of All (1982, TV film)
- Based on Friday Foster:
  - Friday Foster (1975)
- Based on Fritz the Cat:
  - Fritz the Cat (1972)
  - The Nine Lives of Fritz the Cat (1974)

=== G ===
- Based on Garfield:
  - Garfield: The Movie (2004)
  - Garfield: A Tail of Two Kitties (2006)
  - Garfield Gets Real (2007, direct-to-video)
  - Garfield's Fun Fest (2008, direct-to-video)
  - Garfield's Pet Force (2009, direct-to-video)
  - The Garfield Movie (2024)
  - The Garfield Movie 2 (TBA)
- Based on Gasoline Alley:
  - Gasoline Alley (1951)
  - Corky of Gasoline Alley (1951)

=== H ===
- Based on Harold Teen:
  - Harold Teen (1928)
  - Harold Teen (1934)
- Based on Heathcliff:
  - Heathcliff: The Movie (1986)

=== J ===
- Based on Jane (UK):
  - The Adventures of Jane (1949)
  - Jane and the Lost City (1987)
- Based on Jane Arden:
  - The Adventures of Jane Arden (1939)
- Based on Joe Palooka:
  - Palooka (1934)
  - Joe Palooka, Champ (1946)
  - Gentleman Joe Palooka (1946)
  - Joe Palooka in the Knockout (1947)
  - Joe Palooka in Fighting Mad (1948)
  - Joe Palooka in Winner Take All (1948)
  - Joe Palooka in the Big Fight (1949)
  - Joe Palooka in the Counterpunch (1949)
  - Joe Palooka Meets Humphrey (1950)
  - Joe Palooka in Humphrey Takes a Chance (1950)
  - Joe Palooka in the Squared Circle (1950)
  - Joe Palooka in Triple Cross (1951)
- Based on Jungle Jim:
  - Jungle Jim (1948)
  - The Lost Tribe (1949)
  - Mark of the Gorilla (1950)
  - Captive Girl (1950)
  - Pygmy Island (1950)
  - Fury of the Congo (1951)
  - Jungle Manhunt (1951)
  - Jungle Jim in the Forbidden Land (1952)
  - Voodoo Tiger (1952)
  - Savage Mutiny (1953)
  - Valley of the Head Hunters (1953)
  - Killer Ape (1953)
  - Jungle Man-Eaters (1954)
  - Cannibal Attack (1954)
  - Jungle Moon Men (1955)
  - Devil Goddess (1956)

=== K ===
- Based on King of the Royal Mounted:
  - King of the Royal Mounted, 20th Century Fox, September 11, 1936, starred Robert Kent. The feature was retitled Romance of the Royal Mounted when it was released on video.
  - King of the Royal Mounted, Republic, September 20, 1940, 12-part serial, starred Allan "Rocky" Lane
  - The Yukon Patrol, Republic, April 30, 1942, feature film version of the 1940 serial King of the Royal Mounted
  - King of the Mounties, Republic Oct. 17, 1942, 12-part serial, also starring Allan "Rocky" Lane

=== L ===
- Based on Li'l Abner:
  - Li'l Abner (1940)
  - Li'l Abner (1959)
  - Li'l Abner (1971, TV film)
- Based on Little Iodine:
  - Little Iodine (1946), possibly a lost film
- Based on Little Nemo:
  - Little Nemo: Adventures in Slumberland (1989 Japan/1992 United States)
  - Slumberland (2022)
- Based on Little Orphan Annie:
  - Little Orphan Annie (1932)
  - Little Orphan Annie (1938)
  - Annie (1982)
  - Annie: A Royal Adventure! (1995, TV film)
  - Annie (1999, TV film)
  - Annie (2014)

=== M ===
- Based on Mandrake the Magician:
  - Mandrake Killing'e Karşı (1967, unauthorized Turkish film)
  - Mandrake (1979, TV film)
- Based on Marmaduke:
  - Marmaduke (2010)
  - Marmaduke (2022)
- Based on Modesty Blaise (UK):
  - Modesty Blaise (1966)
  - Modesty Blaise (1982, TV pilot)
  - My Name Is Modesty (2003)
- Based on The Mostly Unfabulous Social Life of Ethan Green:
  - The Mostly Unfabulous Social Life of Ethan Green (2005)
- Based on Motu Patlu (India)
  - Motu Patlu in Wonderland! (2012, TV film)
  - Motu Patlu: In Alien World! (2016, TV film)
  - Motu Patlu: King of Kings (2016)

=== N ===
- Based on Nono-chan (Japan):
  - My Neighbors the Yamadas (1999)

=== O ===
- Based on Over the Hedge:
  - Over the Hedge (2006)

=== P ===
- Based on Peanuts:
  - A Boy Named Charlie Brown (1969)
  - Snoopy Come Home (1972)
  - Race for Your Life, Charlie Brown (1977)
  - Bon Voyage, Charlie Brown (And Don't Come Back!!) (1980)
  - The Peanuts Movie (2015)
  - Snoopy's Big City Adventure: A Peanuts Movie (2026)
- Based on The Phantom:
  - The Phantom (1961, TV film)
  - The Phantom (1996)
  - The Phantom (2009, TV miniseries)
- Based on Pogo:
  - I Go Pogo (1980)
- Based on Popeye:
  - Popeye (1980)
  - Popeye's Voyage: The Quest for Pappy (2004, animated)
  - Popeye (2015, animated, cancelled)
- Based on Prince Valiant:
  - Prince Valiant (1954)
  - Prince Valiant (1997)

=== R ===
- Based on Red Ryder:
  - Tucson Raiders (1944)
  - Marshal of Reno (1944)
  - The San Antonio Kid (1944)
  - Cheyenne Wildcat (1944)
  - Vigilantes of Dodge City (1944)
  - Sheriff of Las Vegas (1944)
  - Great Stagecoach Robbery (1945)
  - Lone Texas Ranger (1945)
  - Phantom of the Plains (1945)
  - Marshal of Laredo (1945)
  - Colorado Pioneers (1945)
  - Wagon Wheels Westward (1945)
  - California Gold Rush (1946)
  - Sheriff of Redwood Valley (1946)
  - Sun Valley Cyclone (1946)
  - Conquest of Cheyenne (1946)
  - Santa Fe Uprising (1946)
  - Stagecoach to Denver (1946)
  - Vigilantes of Boomtown (1947)
  - Homesteaders of Paradise Valley (1947)
  - Oregon Trail Scouts (1947)
  - Rustlers of Devil's Canyon (1947)
  - Marshal of Cripple Creek (1947)
  - Ride, Ryder, Ride! (1949)
  - Roll, Thunder, Roll! (1949)
  - The Fighting Redhead (1950)
  - Cowboy and the Prizefighter (1950)
- Based on Reg'lar Fellers:
  - Reg'lar Fellers (1941)

=== S ===
- Based on Sad Sack:
  - The Sad Sack (1957)
- Based on Skippy:
  - Skippy (1931)
  - Sooky (1931)
- Based on St Trinian's School (UK):
  - The Belles of St Trinian's (1954)
  - Blue Murder at St Trinian's (1957)
  - The Pure Hell of St Trinian's (1960)
  - The Great St Trinian's Train Robbery (1966)
  - The Wildcats of St Trinian's (1980)
  - St Trinian's (2007)
  - St Trinian's 2: The Legend of Fritton's Gold (2009)

=== T ===
- Based on Tailspin Tommy:
  - Mystery Plane (1939)
  - Stunt Pilot (1939)
  - Sky Patrol (1939)
  - Danger Flight (1939)
- Based on Tamara Drewe (UK):
  - Tamara Drewe (2010)
- Based on Tiffany Jones (UK):
  - Tiffany Jones (1973)
- Based on Tillie the Toiler:
  - Tillie the Toiler (1927)
  - Tillie the Toiler (1941)

=== W ===
- Based on Willie and Joe (Bill Mauldin):
  - Up Front (1951)
  - Back at the Front (1952)

== Theatrical short films ==
- Based on Abie the Agent:
  - Animated short: Iska Worreh (1917)
  - Animated Short: Abie Kabibble Outwitted His Rival (1917)
- Based on Ally Sloper (UK):
  - live-action shorts Ally Sloper (1898)
  - live-action short Sloper's Visit to Brighton (1898)
  - live-action short Ally Sloper as a Conjuror (1903)
  - live-action short Ally Sloper on Holiday (1903)
  - live-action short Ally Sloper at the Races (1903)
  - series of six live-action shorts (1921)
- Based on Barney Google and Snuffy Smith:
  - series of 12 live-action shorts (1928–1929), starting with Horsefeathers (1928)
  - series of four animated shorts (1935–1936), starting with Tetched in the Head (1935)
- Based on Buster Brown:
  - series of five shorts (1914), starting with Buster Brown on the Care and Treatment of Goats (1914)
  - series of 50 live-action shorts (1925–1929), starting with Educating Buster (1925)
- Based on Canyon Kiddies:
  - Animated short Mighty Hunters (1940)
- Based on Desperate Desmond:
  - series of seven live-action shorts (1911–1912), starting with Desperate Desmond Almost Succeeds (1911)
- Based on The Doings of the Duffs
  - The Doings of the Duffs (1917)
- Based on Hairbreadth Harry:
  - Live-action short Fearless Harry (1926)
  - Live-action short Danger Ahead (1926)
  - Live-action short Sawdust Baby (1926)
  - Live-action short Sign Them Papers (1927)
  - Live-action short Curses (1927)
  - Live-action short Foiled (1927)
  - Live-action short Dirty Work (1927)
  - Live-action short The Villain (1927)
  - Live-action short Nutty but Nice (1927)
  - Live-action short Moonshine and Noses (1927)
- Based on Henry:
  - Animated short Betty Boop with Henry, the Funniest Living American (1935)
- Based on Hogan's Alley:
  - live-action short Trouble in Hogan's Alley (1900)
- Based on Joe and Asbestos:
  - Live-action short A Horse's Tale (1937)
  - Live-action short Under the Wire (1937)
  - Live-action short Boarder Trouble (1938)
- Based on Joe Palooka:
  - series of nine two-reel live-action shorts (1936–37), starting with For the Love of Pete (1936)
- Based on The Katzenjammer Kids:
  - Live-action short The Katzenjammer Kids in School (1898)
  - Live-action short The Katzenjammer Kids Have a Love Affair (1900)
  - series of eight live-action shorts (1912), starting with The Katzenjammer Kids (1912)
  - series of 37 animated shorts (1916–1918), starting with The Chinese Cook (1916)
  - series of five animated shorts (1920), starting with Knock on the Window, the Door Is a Jamb (1920)
  - The Captain and the Kids (1938–1939) series of 15 animated shorts
- Based on Krazy Kat:
  - multiple series of animated shorts (both sound and silent films)
- Based on Lady Bountiful (by Gene Carr):
  - Live-action short Lady Bountiful Visits the Murphys on Wash Day (1903)
- Based on Let George Do It:
  - series of 40 live-action shorts (1924–1929), starting with Why George! (1924)
- Based on Li'l Abner:
  - series of five animated shorts (1944), starting with Amoozin' But Confoozin' (1944)
- Based on Little Jimmy
  - animated short Betty Boop and Little Jimmy (1936)
- Based on The Little King:
  - series of 12 animated shorts (1933–1934), starting with AM to PM (1933)
  - animated short Betty Boop and the Little King (1936)
- Based on Little Nemo:
  - animated short Winsor McCay, the Famous Cartoonist of the N.Y. Herald and his Moving Comics aka Little Nemo (1911, included in the National Film Registry)
- Based on Mike and Ike (They Look Alike):
  - series of 24 live-action shorts (1927–1929), starting with Dancing Fools (1927)
- Based on Mischievous Willie:
  - Live-action short Mischievous Willie's Rocking Chair Motor (1902)
- Based on Mr. Jack:
  - Live-action short Mr. Jack in the Dressing Room (1904)
- Based on Mutt and Jeff:
  - List of Mutt and Jeff live-action shorts
  - List of Mutt and Jeff theatrical cartoons
- Based on Nancy:
  - Animated shorts School Daze (1942)
  - Animated shorts Doing Their Bit (1942)
- Based on The Newlyweds/Snookums:
  - series of 37 live-action shorts (1926–1929), starting with The Newlyweds' Neighbors (1926)
- Based on The Outbursts of Everett True:
  - series of live-action shorts starting with Everett True Breaks Into The Movies (1916)
- Based on Popeye:
  - Popeye the Sailor (1933–1957, animated)
  - two-reel Technicolor shorts:
    - Popeye the Sailor Meets Sindbad the Sailor (1936, included in the National Film Registry)
    - Popeye the Sailor Meets Ali Baba's Forty Thieves (1937)
    - Aladdin and His Wonderful Lamp (1939)
- Based on Reg'lar Fellers:
  - Animated short Happy Days (1936) produced by Ub Iwerks
- Based on Sad Sack:
  - The Sad Sack (1950) educational film by upa.
- Based on Smitty:
  - series of 10 live-action shorts (1928–1929), starting with No Picnic (1928)
- Toonerville Folks
- Based on Toots and Casper:
  - series of 12 live-action shorts (1928–1929), starting with Fooling Casper (1928)
  - What a Wife (1928)
  - The Family Meal Ticket (1928)
  - Casper's Week End (1928)
  - Smile, Buttercup, Smile (1929)
  - Big-Hearted Toots (1929)
  - Casper's Night Out (1929)
  - Toots' Big Idea (1929)
  - Spareribs Reforms (1929)
  - His Wife's Secret (1929)
  - Who's the Boss? (1929)
  - Don't Say Ain't (1929)
- Based on Uncle Mun:
  - Uncle Mun and the Minister (1912)
  - A Thrilling Rescue by Uncle Mun (1912)
- Based on Willie Westinghouse
  - A Shocking Incident (I) (1903) (Short) aka "Willie Westinghouse and the Doctor's Battery"
- Based on Windy Riley
  - Windy Riley Goes Hollywood (1931)
- Based on Winnie Winkle:
  - Series of ten live action shorts (1926–1928), starting with Working Winnie (1926)

== Television specials ==
- Based on B.C.:
  - B.C.: The First Thanksgiving (1973)
  - B.C.: A Special Christmas (1981)
- Based on Blondie:
  - Blondie & Dagwood (1987)
  - Blondie & Dagwood: Second Wedding Workout (1989)
- Based on Cathy:
  - Cathy (1987)
  - Cathy's Last Resort (1988)
  - Cathy's Valentine (1989)
- Based on Dennis the Menace:
  - Dennis the Menace in Mayday for Mother (1981)
- Based on Doonesbury:
  - A Doonesbury Special (1977)
- Based on The Family Circus:
  - A Special Valentine with the Family Circus (1978)
  - A Family Circus Christmas (1979)
  - A Family Circus Easter (1982)
- Based on The Far Side:
  - Gary Larson's Tales from the Far Side (1994)
  - Tales from the Far Side II (1997)
- Based on For Better or For Worse:
  - For Better or for Worse: The Bestest Present (1985)
  - For Better or for Worse: The Last Camping Trip (1992)
  - For Better or for Worse: A Christmas Angel (1992)
  - For Better or for Worse: A Valentine from the Heart (1993)
  - For Better or for Worse: The Good-for-Nothing (1993)
  - For Better or for Worse: The Babe Magnet (1994)
  - For Better or for Worse: A Storm in April (1995)
- Based on Garfield:
  - Here Comes Garfield (1982)
  - Garfield on the Town (1983)
  - Garfield in the Rough (1984)
  - Garfield's Halloween Adventure (1985)
  - Garfield in Paradise (1986)
  - Garfield Goes Hollywood (1987)
  - A Garfield Christmas (1987)
  - Happy Birthday, Garfield (1988)
  - Garfield: His 9 Lives (1988)
  - Garfield's Babes and Bullets (1989)
  - Garfield's Thanksgiving (1989)
  - Garfield's Feline Fantasies (1990)
  - Garfield Gets a Life (1991)
- Based on Hägar the Horrible:
  - Hägar the Horrible (1989)
- Based on Little Orphan Annie:
  - Little Orphan Annie's A Very Animated Christmas (1995)
- Based on Marvin:
  - Marvin, Baby of the Year (1989)
- Based on Peanuts:
  - see List of Peanuts media: TV specials
- Based on Pogo:
  - The Pogo Special Birthday Special (1969)
- Based on A Wish for Wings That Work: (characters originated in Bloom County)
  - A Wish for Wings That Work (1991)
- Based on Ziggy:
  - Ziggy's Gift (1982)

== Serial films ==
- Based on Ace Drummond:
  - Ace Drummond (1936)
- Based on The Adventures of Smilin' Jack:
  - The Adventures of Smilin' Jack (1943)
- Based on Brenda Starr, Reporter:
  - Brenda Starr, Reporter (1945)
- Based on Brick Bradford:
  - Brick Bradford (1947)
- Based on Bruce Gentry:
  - Bruce Gentry (1949)
- Based on Dick Tracy:
  - Dick Tracy (1937)
  - Dick Tracy Returns (1938)
  - Dick Tracy's G-Men (1939)
  - Dick Tracy vs Crime Inc (1939)
- Based on Don Winslow of the Navy:
  - Don Winslow of the Navy (1942)
  - Don Winslow of the Coast Guard (1943)
- Based on Flash Gordon:
  - Flash Gordon (1936)
  - Flash Gordon's Trip to Mars (1938)
  - Flash Gordon Conquers the Universe (1940)
- Based on Jungle Jim:
  - Jungle Jim (1937)
- Based on King of the Royal Mounted:
  - King of the Royal Mounted (1940)
  - King of the Mounties (1942)
- Based on Mandrake the Magician:
  - Mandrake the Magician (1939)
- Based on The Phantom:
  - The Phantom (1943)
  - The Adventures of Captain Africa (1955) (rights to character expired during production)
- Based on Radio Patrol:
  - Radio Patrol (1937)
- Based on Red Barry:
  - Red Barry (1938)
- Based on Red Ryder:
  - Adventures of Red Ryder (1940)
- Based on Secret Agent X-9:
  - Secret Agent X-9 (1937)
  - Secret Agent X-9 (1945)
- Based on Tailspin Tommy:
  - Tailspin Tommy (1934)
  - Tailspin Tommy in the Great Air Mystery (1935)
- Based on Terry and the Pirates:
  - Terry and the Pirates (1940)
- Based on Tim Tyler's Luck:
  - Tim Tyler's Luck (1937)

== Other ==
- Caveman: V.T. Hamlin & Alley Oop (2005, comic strip documentary)
- Dark Dungeons (2014, short film, Chick tract)
- The Fantastic Funnies (1980, comic strip documentary)
- God Hates Cartoons (2002, DVD compilation of animated shorts)

== Highest grossing comic strip films ==
Superhero films, comic book and manga adaptations are not included as they have their own list. See List of highest-grossing superhero films, highest grossing comic book adaptations and Highest-grossing Manga films.

Garfield is the most frequent franchise with 4 films on the list,

all had a theatrical run (including re-releases) since 1951 . 1980 is the frequent year with 3 films on the list.

Films that have not played since then do not appear on the chart due to ticket price inflation, population size, and ticket purchasing trends not being considered

Rank	Film	Worldwide gross	Year	Comic strip	Ref
1	Over the Hedge	$339,795,890	2006	Over the Hedge	
2	The Garfield Movie	$257,211,259	2024	Garfield	
3	The Peanuts Movie	$246,233,113	2015	Peanuts	
4	The Addams Family	$204,394,183	2019	The Addams Family	
5	Garfield: The Movie	$203,172,417	2004	Garfield	
6	The Addams Family	$191,483,868	1991	The Addams Family	
7	Dick Tracy	$162,738,726	1990	Dick Tracy	
8	Garfield: A Tail of Two Kitties	$143,325,970	2006	Garfield	
9	Annie	$136,853,506	2014	Little Orphan Annie	
10	The Addams Family 2	$119,815,153	2021	The Adams Family	
11	Dennis the Menace	$117,270,765	1993	Dennis the Menace	
12	Fritz the Cat	$90,000,000	1972	Fritz the Cat	
13	Marmaduke	$89,895,930	2010	Marmaduke	
14	Annie	$61,043,614	1982	Little Orphan Annie	
15	Popeye	$60,000,000	1980	Thimble Theater	
16	Addams Family Values	$48,919,043	1993	The Addams Family	
17	St Trinian's	$29,067,829	2007	St Trinian's School	
18	Tamara Drewe	$12,037,973	2010	Tamara Drewe	
19	A Boy Named Charlie Brown	$12,000,000	1969	Peanuts	
20	My Neighbors the Yamadas	$11,900,000	1999	Nono-chan	
21	Little Nemo: Adventures in Slumberland	$11,400,000	1989	Little Nemo	
22	St Trinian's 2: The Legend of Fritton's Gold	$11,198,830	2009	St Trinian's School	
23	The Sad Sack	$3,500,000	1957	Sad Sack	
24	Race for Your Life, Charlie Brown	$3,223,888	1977	Peanuts	
25	Garfield's Fun Fest	$3,068,511	2008	Garfield	
26	Modesty Blaise	$3,000,000	1966	Modesty Blaise	
27	The Nine Lives of Fritz the Cat	$3,000,000	1974	Fritz the Cat	
28	Heathcliff: The Movie	$2,610,686	1986	Heathcliff	
29	Prince Valiant	$2,600,000	1956	Prince Valiant in the Days of King Arthur	
30	Bon Voyage, Charlie Brown (and Don't Come Back!!)	$2,013,193	1980	Peanuts	
31	Up Front	$1,950,000	1951	Willie and Joe	
32	Garfield Gets Real	$1,726,453	2007	Garfield	
33	Marmaduke	$1,521,190	2022	Marmaduke	
34	Willie and Joe in Tokyo	$1,300,000	1952	Willie and Joe	
35	Fatty Finn	$1,064,000	1980	Fatty Finn	

== See also ==
- Comic strip
- Lists of film source material
- List of films based on comics
- List of films based on radio series
- List of films based on television programs
- List of television series based on comic strips
