= Bringing Up Father (disambiguation) =

Bringing Up Father is an American comic strip.

Bringing Up Father may also refer to:

- Bringing Up Father (1928 film), an American silent comedy film, based on the comic strip
- Bringing Up Father (1946 film), an American comedy film, based on the comic strip
- Bringing Up Father (radio), an American radio situation comedy show, based on the comic strip

== See also ==
- Bringing Up Baby (disambiguation)
