= Joe Devlin (actor) =

American actor (1894–1973)

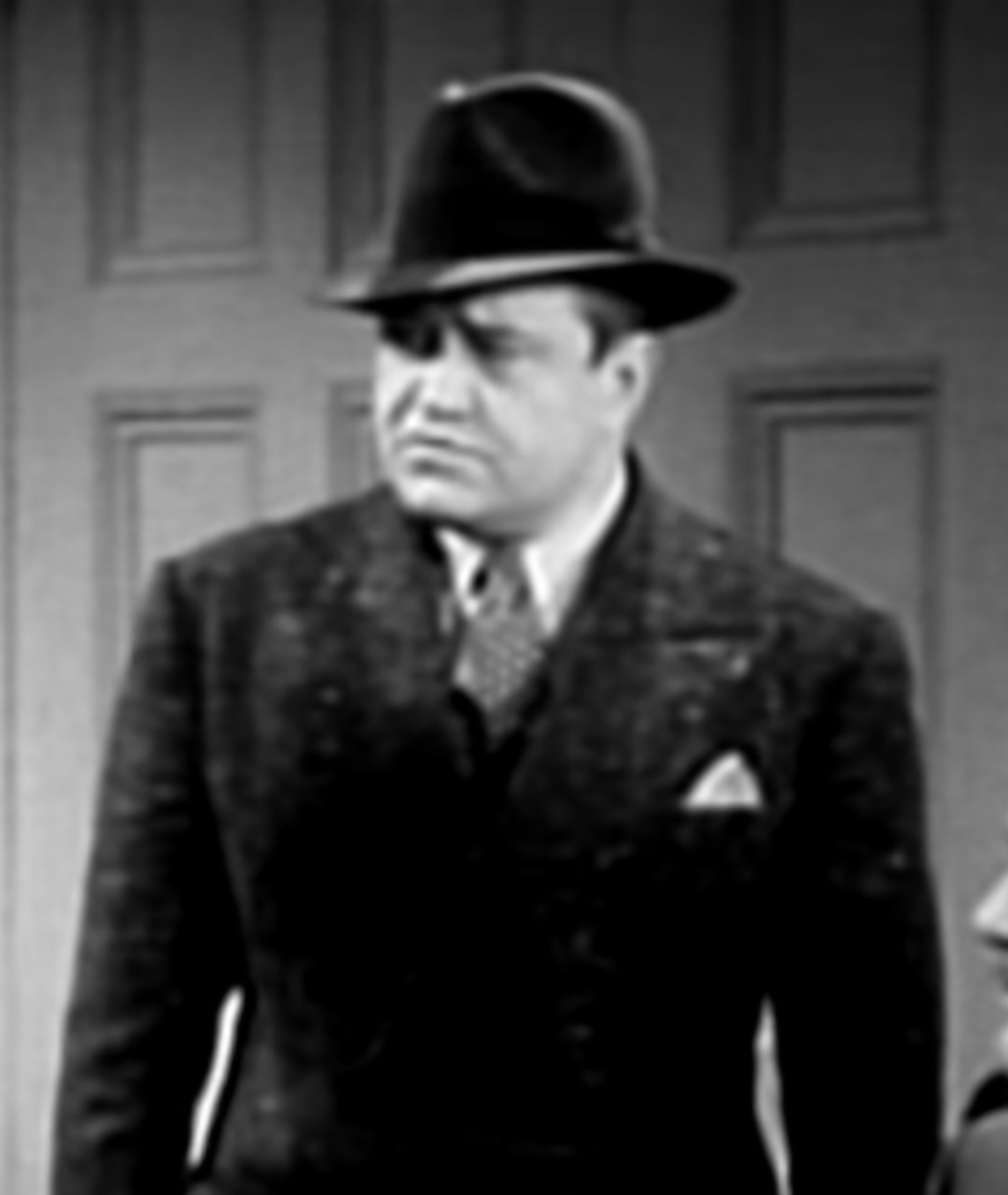
- Devlin in Half a Sinner (1940)
- Born: Christopher Joseph Devlin; February 7, 1894; Manhattan, New York City, U.S.
- Died: October 1, 1973 (aged 79); Burbank, California, U.S.
- Occupations: Vaudevillian, actor
- Years active: 1911–1967
- Spouse(s): Anna Helen Woods, 1913 -? Pearl Christina White, m. 1952
- Children: Rita Devlin (1914-1914) Robert Joseph Mathews (1920-1963) William John Mathews (1922-2008)

Christopher Joseph Devlin (February 7, 1894 – October 1, 1973), better known as Joe Devlin, was a vaudeville and burlesque performer, and American actor with over 170 film and television credits.

A singer, comedian, and actor, he toured extensively in vaudeville and burlesque between 1911 and 1937. Devlin was a member of the Minsky Winter Garden house company in New York City for a few seasons. He relocated to California in 1937 and worked as a character actor in film and TV until 1967, often playing henchmen, bartenders, and cops. He had a co-starring role in Dick Tracy TV series in the early 1950s.

== Early life ==
Devlin was born on February 7, 1894, in a tenement on Vandam Street in Manhattan, New York, the son of Anna (Bird) Devlin and John Francis Devlin, a fireman. His father was Irish, from County Meath, and his mother was of Irish and English ancestry. Devlin attended NYC Public School #8 and LaSalle Academy.

== Career ==
=== Early career ===
Devlin started performing in an after-school quartet called the American Comedy Four which performed on street corners and at neighborhood benefits. Performer George “Honey Boy” Evans hired him to appear in a touring production of the Cohan and Harris musical Minstrels in 1911.

He sometimes worked as a singing waiter in New York City, and briefly took a job with the McKinley Music Company in 1918, then the world’s largest producer of sheet music.

=== Vaudeville ===
Devlin entered vaudeville in 1918 and toured for nearly 20 years.

In the fall of 1920 he and his girlfriend, Iva Boudry, toured extensively on the Orpheum Circuit through the Dakotas and Indiana, where Joe performed as a blackface singer, using the "skill" he learned in the Cohan and Harris Minstrels show.

He also performed at summertime attractions including aboard the SS Canadiana in the summer of 1921 and a Detroit amusement park in the summer of 1922.

His vaudeville partners included yodeler Paul Van Dyke, with whom he performed as Van Dyke & Devlin in several Loew's houses in New York City in 1921; and Fred Pisano as Pisano & Devlin in Boom Boom in the fall of 1928 along the Keith-Albee-Orpheum circuit.

He toured as Joe Devlin & Co., in North Dakota, Montana, and California in 1925, upstate New York in the fall of 1925, and New England in 1927–1928. He also toured with Charles (Red) Marshall in 1931 and Steve Mills along the Fanchon and Marco circuit in 1932.

Devlin was a member of house company at Detroit's National Theater in 1922, and Newark's Strand in 1922–1923 as “character comedian."

His last vaudeville performance was in the Catskills Borscht Belt at the Capitol Hotel at Loch Sheldrake with his girlfriend, Pearl White, and Harry Rose and Helen Black in the summer of 1937, at a time when vaudeville was waning and burlesque jobs were hard to come by due to enforcement of morality laws.

=== Burlesque ===
He played the straight comedian in burlesque from 1924 to 1937. He also sang tenor.

His first job in burlesque came in 1924 when he toured the East Coast in a Mutual Burlesque Association (MBA) show, Joy Belles. Other MBA tours included Frank Harcourt's Red Hot, which featured 6 principals and a chorus of 17 girls in 1924 and 1926, and Dizzy Dames in 1934. He later toured along the Independent Burlesque Association (IBA) circuit in a show billed as Oriental Girls and Cupid's Carnival in 1935; and Town Tattles and Babes of Broadway with Billy "Cheese and Crackers" Hagan in 1936.

Joe was a house principal in the Minsky's Winter Garden theater in New York City in the 1926–1927 season. The NYPD raided the venue for violating morality laws on February 25, 1927. Joe and 12 other performers including Chubby Drisdale, Billy Wallace, and Raymond Paine were held under Section 1140 and tried in court. The raid inspired the 1960 novel The Night They Raided Minskys by Rowland Barber, and the 1968 film. The character Duffy is based on Joe Devlin. He was again a Winter Garden house principal in the 1929–1930 and 1931–1932 seasons.

He performed at Baltimore's Palace Theater in 1928 with famed burlesque celebrity Mae Dix, who Herbert Minsky credited with inventing the strip tease; the Irving Place Theater in New York City in 1928, 1933, and 1934; the New Gotham in New York in 1932 and 1934; the Parsons Hartford and Shubert New Haven in 1933; the Lyric in Philadelphia in 1935; the Star in Brooklyn in 1935; the Gayety in Washington, D.C., in 1936 in Melody Maid with Billy "Cheese and Crackers" Hagan; the Palace Theater in Buffalo in the summer of 1936 in a show featuring Ginger Sherry and comedy duo Stinky Fields and Shorty McAllister; and the Juno Casino and the Star in Brooklyn in 1936 and 1937.

His last East Coast burlesque appearance was at the Star in Brooklyn in April 1937 with Stinky Fields and Shorty McAllister, stripper Rose La Rose, and Countess Nadja.

Joe wrote the book for the burlesque show Novelties of 1936 which featured 24 scenes across 2 acts and toured Issy Hirst’s Independent Burlesque Association (IBA) circuit in 1936 with exotic Russian performer Countess Nadja (Nadjezda Grenko) starring. The show received positive reviews from the Washington Post and the Billboard.

His last burlesque appearance was at the Gayety in Minneapolis, Minnesota, on December 8, 1937.

=== Broadway ===
Joe played Vincent Jones as C. Joseph Devlin in Street Scene at the Ambassador Theater from December 1929 to the show's closing in 1930. He reprised the role for the touring production in 1930.

=== Radio ===
Joe appeared on NBC's coast-to-coast airwaves during a special reading of Street Scene on February 15, 1930. He and Harry Rose tried to launch a radio program in the fall of 1934. He appeared on Joe Penner's The Park Avenue Penners in 1938, broadcast on CBS from Los Angeles.

=== Film and television ===
Devlin started his acting career in 1938, and was under contract to Warner Brothers in the late 1930s. appearing in films such as Held for Ransom, King of the Underworld, Chasing Trouble, Tight Shoes, Murder in the Big House, Sweethearts of the U.S.A. and Shoot to Kill.

He also appeared in TV series like Front Page Detective, My Hero, The Whistler, Damon Runyon Theater and Hey, Jeannie! among others.

Devlin was famous for his resemblance to Italian fascist dictator Benito Mussolini, whom he played in three films during World War II.

During his 30 years in film and television, Joe worked with many stars of the Golden Age including Humphrey Bogart, Marlene Dietrich, Lucille Ball, Bette Davis, James Cagney, Ronald Reagan, Boris Karloff, Mickey Rooney, John Wayne, Edward G. Robinson, Van Johnson, Bob Hope, Lou Costello, Ida Lupino, Eddie Cantor, Ralph Byrd, and so many more.

== Personal life ==
Joe changed the spelling of his name to Christopher JA Devlyn briefly in 1913, and to Christopher Mathews in 1918 when he entered vaudeville.

Devlin married Anna Helen Woods in Manhattan on October 1, 1913 (as Christopher JA Devlyn), with whom he had a daughter, Rita Devlin (1914–1914). Joe was also in a relationship with Iva Mae Boudry from 1918 to 1922, and the couple had two sons, Robert "Bob" Mathews and William "Bill" Mathews. Joe and Iva were vaudeville performers and Iva was a tea leaf reader. His second marriage was to his long-time partner Pearl Christina White in Sherman Oaks, California on December 27, 1952.

Joe built a house at 4248 Vantage Avenue in Studio City in 1940, where he lived until his death. The house was torn down in 2018.

He was friends with Joe Yule, Sr., the father of MGM child actor Mickey Rooney.

== Death ==
Devlin died on October 1, 1973, in Burbank, California, at the age of 79.

== Filmography ==
=== Film ===
- Held for Ransom (1938) – Mark (uncredited)
- Racket Busters (1938) – Truck Driver (uncredited)
- Paroled from the Big House (1938) – Jed Cross
- Tenth Avenue Kid (1938) – Card player (uncredited)
- Gangster's Boy (1938) – Jim – Cop (uncredited)
- Angels with Dirty Faces (1938) – Gangster (uncredited)
- Up the River (1938) – Football player (uncredited)
- Sweethearts (1938) – New York Taxi Driver (uncredited)
- King of the Underworld (1939) – Porky
- The Oklahoma Kid (1939) – Keely – Bartender
- The Mystery of Mr. Wong (1939) – Police Lt. George Devlin
- The Adventures of Jane Arden (1939) – Vanders' Henchman #2 (uncredited)
- Outside These Walls (1939) – Circulation Man (uncredited)
- Panama Lady (1939) – Joe – New York Bartender (uncredited)
- Torchy Runs for Mayor (1939) – Stone – Dolan Henchman (uncredited)
- Another Thin Man (1939) – Barney – Macfay's Bodyguard (uncredited)
- Hell's Kitchen (1939) – Nails – a Henchman (uncredited)
- Waterfront (1939) – Heintzie – Committee Man (uncredited)
- Calling All Marines (1939) – Dutch
- No Place to Go (1939) – Spud
- Mr. Smith Goes to Washington (1939) – Waiter (uncredited)
- Beware Spooks! (1939) – Shooting Gallery Man (uncredited)
- The Roaring Twenties (1939) – Order-Taker (uncredited)
- Invisible Stripes (1939) – Mug Who Brings Drink to Chuck (uncredited)
- The Shadow (1940, Serial) – Henchman (uncredited)
- Chasing Trouble (1940) – Cassidy, Motorcycle Cop
- Three Cheers for the Irish (1940) – Man in Bar with Callagan (uncredited)
- Half a Sinner (1940) – Steve
- Terry and the Pirates (1940, Serial) as Henchman (uncredited)
- Two Girls on Broadway (1940) – Taxi Driver (uncredited)
- Gangs of Chicago (1940) as Lugo, Matty's butler (uncredited)
- A Fugitive from Justice (1940) – Hinky-Dink
- Millionaires in Prison (1940) – Vince Connell (uncredited)
- Carolina Moon (1940) – Racetrack Bookie (uncredited)
- They Drive by Night (1940) – Fatso (uncredited)
- Golden Gloves (1940) – Cloudy Maple (uncredited)
- Strike Up the Band (1940) – 3 Balls 10¢ Attendant (uncredited)
- The Green Hornet Strikes Again! (1941, Serial) – Joe Dolan – Henchman
- Maisie Was a Lady (1941) – Man with Seal (uncredited)
- The Great Mr. Nobody (1941) – Used Car Dealer (uncredited)
- A Man Betrayed (1941) – Tramp at Soup Kitchen (uncredited)
- The Penalty (1941) – Shorty (uncredited)
- Sis Hopkins (1941) – Police Detective (uncredited)
- The Flame of New Orleans (1941) – Fourth Sailor (uncredited)
- The People vs. Dr. Kildare (1941) – Cook at Mike's (uncredited)
- Country Fair (1941) – (uncredited)
- Tight Shoes (1941) – Truck Driver (uncredited)
- Whistling in the Dark (1941) – Taxi Driver (uncredited)
- Manpower (1941) – Bartender (uncredited)
- Honky Tonk (1941) – Masher in Saloon (uncredited)
- They Died with Their Boots On (1941) – Joe (uncredited)
- Shadow of the Thin Man (1941) – Mug Starting Fight at Wrestling Match (uncredited)
- Unholy Partners (1941) – Airplane Mechanic (uncredited)
- Steel Against the Sky (1941) – Ed (scenes deleted)
- True to the Army (1942) – Waiter (uncredited)
- Shepherd of the Ozarks (1942) – Louie
- Murder in the Big House (1942) – Mulligan – Motorcycle Policeman (uncredited)
- Larceny, Inc. (1942) – Spud the Umpire (uncredited)
- Syncopation (1942) – House Detective (uncredited)
- Wings for the Eagle (1942) – Service Station Owner (uncredited)
- The Old Homestead (1942) – Henchman Geetus (uncredited)
- The Devil with Hitler (1942, Short) – Benito Mussolini
- Gentleman Jim (1942) – Hogan (uncredited)
- Fall In (1942) – Sergeant (uncredited)
- They Got Me Covered (1943) – Mussolini (uncredited)
- Slightly Dangerous (1943) – Painter (uncredited)
- Taxi, Mister (1943) – Henchman Stretch
- Lady of Burlesque (1943) – Detective (uncredited)
- That Nazty Nuisance (1943) – Benito Mussolini
- Hi Diddle Diddle (1943) – Dan Hannigan
- The Phantom (1943, Serial) – Singapore Smith (uncredited)
- The Miracle of Morgan's Creek (1944) – Benito Mussolini (uncredited)
- Sweethearts of the U.S.A. (1944) – Boss – 1st Robber
- See Here, Private Hargrove (1944) – Mess Hall Sergeant (uncredited)
- Gambler's Choice (1944) – 'Studs' Franco (uncredited)
- Mr. Skeffington (1944) – Boat Employee (uncredited)
- Sensations of 1945 (1944) – Silas Hawkins (uncredited)
- Johnny Doesn't Live Here Any More (1944) – Ice Man (uncredited)
- Delinquent Daughters (1944) – Detective Hanahan
- Dixie Jamboree (1944) – Police Sgt.
- My Buddy (1944) – Nicky Piastro
- Mystery of the River Boat (1944, Serial) – Louis Schaber
- The Woman in the Window (1944) – Toll Collector on Henry Hudson Parkway
- Brenda Starr, Reporter (1945, Serial) – Police Sgt. Tim Brown (uncredited)
- Roughly Speaking (1945) – Man at Shipyard (uncredited)
- Without Love (1945) – Soldier (uncredited)
- The Master Key (1945, Serial) – Bauer (uncredited)
- Pillow to Post (1945) – Al – Army Sergeant in Jeep (uncredited)
- Bedside Manner (1945) – Augustus (uncredited)
- Captain Eddie (1945) – Brewery Worker (uncredited)
- Boston Blackie's Rendezvous (1945) – Cab Driver Steve Caveroni (uncredited)
- The Shanghai Cobra (1945) – Taylor
- Her Highness and the Bellboy (1945) – Bartender (uncredited)
- Abbott and Costello in Hollywood (1945) – Kelly – Bartender (uncredited)
- Scarlet Street (1945) – Joe Williams, Morning World (uncredited)
- The Hoodlum Saint (1946) – Bartender (scenes deleted)
- The Bachelor's Daughters (1946) – Briggs (uncredited)
- Criminal Court (1946) – Clark J. 'Brownie' Brown
- Bringing Up Father (1946) – Casey – the Hotel Superintendent
- San Quentin (1946) – 'Broadway' Johnson
- The Man I Love (1947) – Waiter (uncredited)
- The Mighty McGurk (1947) – Dog Man (uncredited)
- That Way with Women (1947) – Police Desk Sergeant
- Shoot to Kill (1947) – Smokey
- Fun on a Weekend (1947) – Clothing Shop Proprietor (uncredited)
- Body and Soul (1947) – Prince (uncredited)
- Always Together (1947) – First Cab Driver (uncredited)
- My Wild Irish Rose (1947) – Man in Olympic Theatre Balco (uncredited)
- Killer McCoy (1947) – Cigar Smoking Fight Fan (uncredited)
- If You Knew Susie (1948) – Silent Cy (uncredited)
- The Enchanted Valley (1948) – Bugs Mason
- Bodyguard (1948) – Detective Sgt. Burch (uncredited)
- A Song Is Born (1948) – Adams' Henchman (uncredited)
- Blood on the Moon (1948) – Barney – Bartender (uncredited)
- El Paso (1949) – Bartender at Casa Grande (uncredited)
- A Kiss in the Dark (1949) – Stage Electrician (uncredited)
- Night Unto Night (1949) – Joe, Truckman (uncredited)
- Mighty Joe Young (1949) – Reporter (uncredited)
- Jiggs and Maggie in Jackpot Jitters (1949) – Casey (uncredited)
- The Jackie Robinson Story (1950) – Tough Lodge Members in Stands (uncredited)
- Our Very Own (1950) – Card Player (uncredited)
- Pretty Baby (1950) – Waiter (uncredited)
- Insurance Investigator (1951) – Malone's Henchman (uncredited)
- Stop That Cab (1951) – Short Cop (uncredited)
- All That I Have (1951) – Louie Lumpkin
- On Dangerous Ground (1951) – Bartender (uncredited)
- Double Dynamite (1951) – Frankie Boy (uncredited)
- Bitter Creek (1954) – Pat – Bartender
- Silver Lode (1954) – Wait Little (uncredited)
- Prince of Players (1955) – Theatre Shill (uncredited)
- Abbott and Costello Meet the Keystone Kops (1955) – Mike – Policeman (uncredited)
- Tennessee's Partner (1955) – Prendergast
- While the City Sleeps (1956) – Newspaper Teletype Operator (uncredited)
- Three for Jamie Dawn (1956) – 1st Jury Room Guard (uncredited)
- Shake, Rattle & Rock! (1956) – Squad Car Officer
- The Wayward Bus (1957) – Bus Dispatcher (uncredited)
- The Restless Breed (1957) – Morton (uncredited)
- Calypso Heat Wave (1957) – Room Service Waiter (uncredited)
- Up in Smoke (1957) – Al
- The Gift of Love (1958) – Bar & Grill Waiter (uncredited)
- Hell's Five Hours (1958) – Cook (uncredited)
- The Decks Ran Red (1958) – Crewman (uncredited)
- The Last Hurrah (1958) – Man (uncredited)
- The Ugly Dachshund (1966) – Dog Owner (uncredited)
- The Last of the Secret Agents? (1966) – Waiter-Spy (uncredited)
- Good Times (1967) – Bartender (final film role)

=== Television ===
- Front Page Detective – Death of a Hero (1951) TV Episode .... uncredited
- My Hero – Horse Trail (1952) TV Episode .... Spike
- The Abbott and Costello Show – Las Vegas (1953) TV Episode .... Bit – From Bed to Worse (1954) TV Episode .... Man – Barber Lou (1954) TV Episode .... Motorcycle Cop (uncredited)
- I Married Joan – Party Line (1954) TV Episode .... uncredited – Two Saint Bernards (1954) TV Episode .... Police Dispatcher
- The Adventures of Rin Tin Tin – Rin Tin Tin, Outlaw (1954) TV Episode .... Major Phillips
- Topper – Topper's Amnesia (1955) TV Episode .... Max
- TV Reader's Digest – How Charlie Faust Won a Pennant for the Giants (1955) TV Episode .... uncredited
- The Whistler – Death Sentence (1955) TV Episode .... Bartender
- My Little Margie – Buried Treasure (1953) TV Episode .... Joe – Margie's Elopement (1955) TV Episode .... Mr. Rivers
- Celebrity Playhouse – Bachelor Husband (1956) TV Episode .... Phone Man
- Damon Runyon Theater – Tobias the Terrible (1955) TV Episode .... Happy – Blonde Mink (1955) TV Episode .... uncredited – Cleo (1956) TV Episode .... uncredited – The Pigeon Gets Plucked (1956) TV Episode .... uncredited
- NBC Matinee Theater – Statute of Limitations (1956) TV Episode .... Mervin
- Our Miss Brooks – Geraldine (1956) TV Episode .... Policeman
- Hey, Jeannie! – Jeannie's Here (1956) TV Episode .... N.Y. policeman
- The Life of Riley – Riley, the Animal Lover (1953) TV Episode .... Policeman – Vacation Plans (1957) TV Episode .... The Guard
- Death Valley Days – Solomon in All His Glory (1953) TV Episode .... Paddy the Bartender (uncredited) – Quong Kee (1957) TV Episode .... Charlie Moran
- Wanted Dead or Alive – Baa Baa (1961) TV Episode .... Larry
- Holiday Lodge – Wanted: Two Recreation Directors (1961) TV Episode .... Smitty
- The Dick Van Dyke Show – Forty-Four Tickets (1961) TV Episode .... Shabby Man
- The Hathaways – The Paint Job (1962) TV Episode .... Gateman
- Gunsmoke – Catawomper (1962) TV Episode .... Jester – Reprisal (1962) TV Episode .... Dan Binny – The Boys (1962) TV Episode .... Drummer
- The Danny Thomas Show – The Baby Hates Charley (1962) TV Episode .... Policeman
- Dennis the Menace – Poor Mr. Wilson (1962) TV Episode .... Needy Man #1 (uncredited)
- Bob Hope Presents the Chrysler Theatre – The Square Peg (1964) TV Episode .... Zakaris
