= Jiggs and Maggie (film series) =

- Written by: Based on the cartoons of George McManus
- Starring: Joe Yule; Renie Riano
- Production company: Monogram Pictures
- Distributed by: Monogram Pictures
- Country: United States
- Language: English

Jiggs and Maggie are the major characters in a series of films made by Monogram Pictures, a low-budget Hollywood film studio, between 1946 and 1950. Jiggs and Maggie are Irish immigrants to the United States, who constantly argue. The characters were created by the cartoonist George McManus in his long-running strip Bringing Up Father. McManus appears in four of the films, playing himself.

The characters had originally appeared on screen in the 1928 Metro-Goldwyn-Mayer film Bringing Up Father. In 1946, Monogram made a fresh version starring actors Joe Yule and Renie Riano. Due to the popularity of the first film, a series of four sequels followed.

The final film in the series, Jiggs and Maggie Out West, was released around three weeks after Yule's death in March, 1950.

== Films ==
- Bringing Up Father (1946)
- Jiggs and Maggie in Society (1947)
- Jiggs and Maggie in Court (1948)
- Jiggs and Maggie in Jackpot Jitters (1949)
- Jiggs and Maggie Out West (1950)

== Bibliography ==
- Drew, Bernard. Motion Picture Series and Sequels: A Reference Guide. Routledge, 2013.
