= Tim Ryan (actor) =

American actor (1899–1956)

- Born: Timothy Thomas Ryan; July 5, 1899; Bayonne, New Jersey, U.S.
- Died: October 22, 1956 (aged 57); Los Angeles, California, U.S.
- Occupation: Actor
- Years active: 1935-1957
- Spouse: Irene Ryan (m. 1922; div. 1942)

Timothy Thomas Ryan (July 5, 1899 – October 22, 1956) was an American performer and film actor.

== Life and career ==
Ryan was born in Bayonne, New Jersey, on July 5, 1899, to Edward and Hannah (née McGeehan) Ryan.

He teamed with Irene Noblette for a vaudeville act, "Tim and Irene", who performed on Broadway, in films, and on radio. They soon married; Irene Ryan later played Granny on The Beverly Hillbillies. They appeared in short films for Educational Pictures in the mid-1930s. based on their vaudeville act. The Ryans were married from 1922 to 1942. Even after their divorce in 1942, Tim and Irene occasionally worked together.

In the 1940s, Ryan began working at Monogram Pictures as an all-purpose character player (policemen, newspaper editors, detectives, convicts, and other stock characters) and script writer. He was regularly featured in two series: as Lt. Mike Ruark in the Charlie Chan mysteries of the late 1940s, and as Dinty Moore, Joe Yule's drinking buddy in the Jiggs and Maggie comedies. He also played occasional character roles in the studio's highly successful Bowery Boys comedies, and almost always contributed to the scripts. He retired in 1953, only to be persuaded by Huntz Hall to return for Hall's first lead at the studio, Fighting Trouble (1956). Ryan appeared in three more films before his death in Los Angeles on October 22, 1956, at the age of 57.

== Selected filmography ==
- Brother Orchid (1940) - Turkey Malone
- Private Affairs (1940) - Bartender Harry
- Third Finger, Left Hand (1940) - Third Mate on Ship (uncredited)
- I'm Nobody's Sweetheart Now (1940) - Judge Saunders
- Hullabaloo (1940) - Skee Golf Concessionaire (uncredited)
- Where Did You Get That Girl? (1941) - Police Inspector
- Lucky Devils (1941) - K.W. Momsen
- Maisie Was a Lady (1941) - Second Barker (uncredited)
- The Strawberry Blonde (1941) - Streetcleaner Foreman (uncredited)
- A Man Betrayed (1941) - Mr. Wilson, Insurance Agent
- The Penalty (1941) - Police Sergeant (uncredited)
- Dead Men Tell (1941) - Red Eye Bartender (uncredited)
- Pot o' Gold (1941) - Snooky (uncredited)
- Sis Hopkins (1941) - Police Sergeant (uncredited)
- Angels with Broken Wings (1941) - (uncredited)
- San Antonio Rose (1941) - Gus (uncredited)
- Sweetheart of the Campus (1941) - Football Coach (uncredited)
- Hurricane Smith (1941) - Bartender (uncredited)
- Citadel of Crime (1941) - Minor Role (uncredited)
- Ice-Capades (1941) - Jackson
- Dr. Kildare's Wedding Day (1941) - Piano Mover (uncredited)
- Harmon of Michigan (1941) - Flash Regan
- Two Latins from Manhattan (1941) - Police Sergeant
- You'll Never Get Rich (1941) - Cop ticketing Curtis (uncredited)
- It Started with Eve (1941) - Tom - Assistant Editor (uncredited)
- Last of the Duanes (1941) - Bartender (uncredited)
- Three Girls About Town (1941) - Singing Drunk
- Public Enemies (1941) - Trumbull
- I Wake Up Screaming (1941) - Detective (uncredited)
- The Devil Pays Off (1941) - First Mate (uncredited)
- Rise and Shine (1941) - Doorman (uncredited)
- Melody Lane (1941) - Police Sergeant
- Bedtime Story (1941) - Mac
- Ball of Fire (1941) - Motor Cop
- Don't Get Personal (1942) - Traffic Cop
- Blue, White and Perfect (1942) - Barney - Cop (uncredited)
- Blondie Goes to College (1942) - Mr. Higby, Football Coach (uncredited)
- Nazi Agent (1942) - Officer (uncredited)
- Mr. and Mrs. North (1942) - O'Toole the Fingerprint Man (uncredited)
- Pardon My Stripes (1942) - Speed Wilson (uncredited)
- A Tragedy at Midnight (1942) - Police Commissioner (uncredited)
- Yokel Boy (1942) - Waiter (uncredited)
- Secret Agent of Japan (1942) - Bartender (uncredited)
- Butch Minds the Baby (1942) - Mike (uncredited)
- The Courtship of Andy Hardy (1942) - Police Officer Farrell (uncredited)
- This Time for Keeps (1942) - Professor Diz (uncredited)
- This Gun for Hire (1942) - Weems - Guard (uncredited)
- Sweetheart of the Fleet (1942) - Gordon Crouse
- Tortilla Flat (1942) - Rupert Hogan (uncredited)
- Flight Lieutenant (1942) - Bartender (uncredited)
- Just Off Broadway (1942) - Bus Tour Guide (uncredited)
- The Man in the Trunk (1942) - Auctioneer
- Get Hep to Love (1942) - Detective Tucker
- The Forest Rangers (1942) - Keystone Cop (uncredited)
- Stand By All Networks (1942) - Police Inspector Ryan
- Strictly in the Groove (1942) - Professor Blake
- Stand by for Action (1942) - Lt. Tim Ryan
- Reveille with Beverly (1943) - Mr. Kennedy
- Two Weeks to Live (1943) - Thrill-a-Minute Higgens (uncredited)
- Hit Parade of 1943 (1943) - Brownie May
- Redhead from Manhattan (1943) - Mike Glendon
- Sarong Girl (1943) - Tim Raynor
- Melody Parade (1943) - Happy Harrington
- Mystery of the 13th Guest (1943) - Police Lt. Burke
- Riding High (1943) - Jones (uncredited)
- The Sultan's Daughter (1943) - Tim
- Swingtime Johnny (1943) - Sparks
- Swing Out the Blues (1943) - Judge Dudley Gordon
- True to Life (1943) - Mr. Mammal (uncredited)
- Her Primitive Man (1944) - House Detective (uncredited)
- Hot Rhythm (1944) - Mr. O'Hara
- And the Angels Sing (1944) - Stage-Door Man (uncredited)
- Detective Kitty O'Day (1944) - Inspector Clancy
- Kansas City Kitty (1944) - Dave Clark
- Shadow of Suspicion (1944) - Everett G. Northrup
- Crazy Knights (1944) - Grogan
- Hi, Beautiful (1944) - Babcock
- Adventures of Kitty O'Day (1945) - Inspector Clancy
- Fashion Model (1945) - Police Inspector O'Hara
- Rockin' in the Rockies (1945) - Tom Trove
- Swingin' on a Rainbow (1945) - Hustun Greer
- Detour (1945) - Nevada Diner Proprietor
- Who's Guilty? (1945) - Duke Ellis
- Idea Girl (1946) - Ken Williams (uncredited)
- Two Sisters from Boston (1946) - Mr. Dibson (uncredited)
- Dark Alibi (1946) - Foggy
- Till the End of Time (1946) - Steve Sumpter (uncredited)
- Wife Wanted (1946) - Bartender
- Bringing Up Father (1946) - Dinty Moore
- Blondie's Holiday (1947) - Mike
- High Barbaree (1947) - Ringmaster (uncredited)
- News Hounds (1947) - editor John 'Bullfrog' Burke
- The Unfinished Dance (1947) - Moose (uncredited)
- Merton of the Movies (1947) - Mammoth Studio's Night guard (uncredited)
- Cass Timberlane (1947) - Police Officer Charlie Ellis (uncredited)
- Body and Soul (1947) - Jack Shelton (uncredited)
- Jiggs and Maggie in Society (1947) - Dinty Moore
- Half Past Midnight (1948) - Amos the Bartender (uncredited)
- Shanghai Chest (1948) - Police Lt. Mike Ruark
- Beyond Glory (1948) - Partier Punched by Rocky (uncredited)
- The Golden Eye (1948) - Lt. Mike Ruark, aka "Vincent O'Brien"
- The Luck of the Irish (1948) - Patrolman Clancy (uncredited)
- Jiggs and Maggie in Court (1948) - Dinty Moore
- Force of Evil (1948) - Johnson (uncredited)
- Miss Mink of 1949 (1949) - Police Sgt. Clancy (uncredited)
- Shamrock Hill (1949) - Uncle
- Alias Nick Beal (1949) - Detective Dodds (uncredited)
- Champion (1949) - Al - Kansas City Manager (uncredited)
- The Stratton Story (1949) - Man Playing Slot Machine (uncredited)
- Sky Dragon (1949) - Lt. Mike Ruark
- Stampede (1949) - The Drunk (uncredited)
- Forgotten Women (1949) - Harry
- Jiggs and Maggie in Jackpot Jitters (1949) - Dinty Moore
- Red, Hot and Blue (1949) - Brad Williams - Stranger (uncredited)
- Dear Wife (1949) - Police Officer Simmons (uncredited)
- Jiggs and Maggie Out West (1950) - Dinty Moore
- Military Academy with That Tenth Avenue Gang (1950) - Specs' Father (uncredited)
- The Asphalt Jungle (1950) - Jack, police clerk (uncredited)
- Joe Palooka in Humphrey Takes a Chance (1950) - Bentley
- The Petty Girl (1950) - Durkee - Producer #1 (uncredited)
- My Blue Heaven (1950) - Cop (uncredited)
- To Please a Lady (1950) - Minor Role (uncredited)
- Cuban Fireball (1951) - Detective Bacon
- All That I Have (1951) - Ben Renson
- Crazy Over Horses (1951) - Flynn
- Here Come the Marines (1952) - Sheriff Benson
- Fargo (1952) - Sam
- No Holds Barred (1952) - Mr. Hunter
- The Marksman (1953) - Stagecoach Driver
- From Here to Eternity (1953) - Sergeant Pete Karelsen
- Hot News (1953) - Ringside Fight Announcer (uncredited)
- Private Eyes (1953) - Andy the Cop
- Fighting Trouble (1956) - Ray Vance
- The Cruel Tower (1956) - Bartender (uncredited)
- The Buster Keaton Story (1957) - Studio Policeman
- Beau James (1957) - Captain of Police (uncredited) (final film role)
