= Roy Livingston =

American film editor

- Born: January 2, 1906
- Died: August 1967
- Occupation: Film editor

Roy V. Livingston (February 2, 1906-August, 1967) was an American Film Editor. His credits include Hell to Eternity and Bomba and the Hidden City.

== Selected filmography ==
- Dangerous Holiday (1937)
- Robin Hood of Monterey (1947)
- King of the Bandits (1947)
- Jiggs and Maggie in Jackpot Jitters (1949)
- Forgotten Women (1949)
- Jiggs and Maggie Out West (1950)
- Hot Rod (1950)
- The Road Hustlers (1968)
