= Forgotten Women (1949 film) =

1949 film by William Beaudine

- Directed by: William Beaudine
- Written by: Scott Darling; Jeffrey Bernerd
- Produced by: Jeffrey Bernerd
- Starring: Elyse Knox; Edward Norris; Robert Shayne; Veda Ann Borg
- Cinematography: Marcel Le Picard
- Edited by: Roy V. Livingston
- Music by: Edward J. Kay
- Production company: Monogram Pictures
- Distributed by: Monogram Pictures
- Release date: July 17, 1949
- Running time: 65 minutes
- Country: United States
- Language: English

Forgotten Women is a 1949 American drama film directed by William Beaudine and starring Elyse Knox, Edward Norris and Robert Shayne.

== Plot ==
The film follows the lives and romantic entanglements of three women who frequent a bar.

== Cast ==
- Elyse Knox as Kate Allison
- Edward Norris as Andy Emerson
- Robert Shayne as Richard Marshall
- Theodora Lynch as Ruth Marshall
- Veda Ann Borg as Clair Dunning
- Noel Neill as Ellen Reid
- Tim Ryan as Harry
- Bill Kennedy as Bill Dunning
- Warren Douglas as John Allison
- Selmer Jackson as Judge Donnell
- Paul Frison as Gary

== Bibliography ==
- The American Film Institute Catalog of Motion Pictures Produced in the United States: Feature Films, 1941 - 1950: Feature Films. University of California Press, 1999.
