= Bringing Up Father (1928 film) =

1928 film by Jack Conway

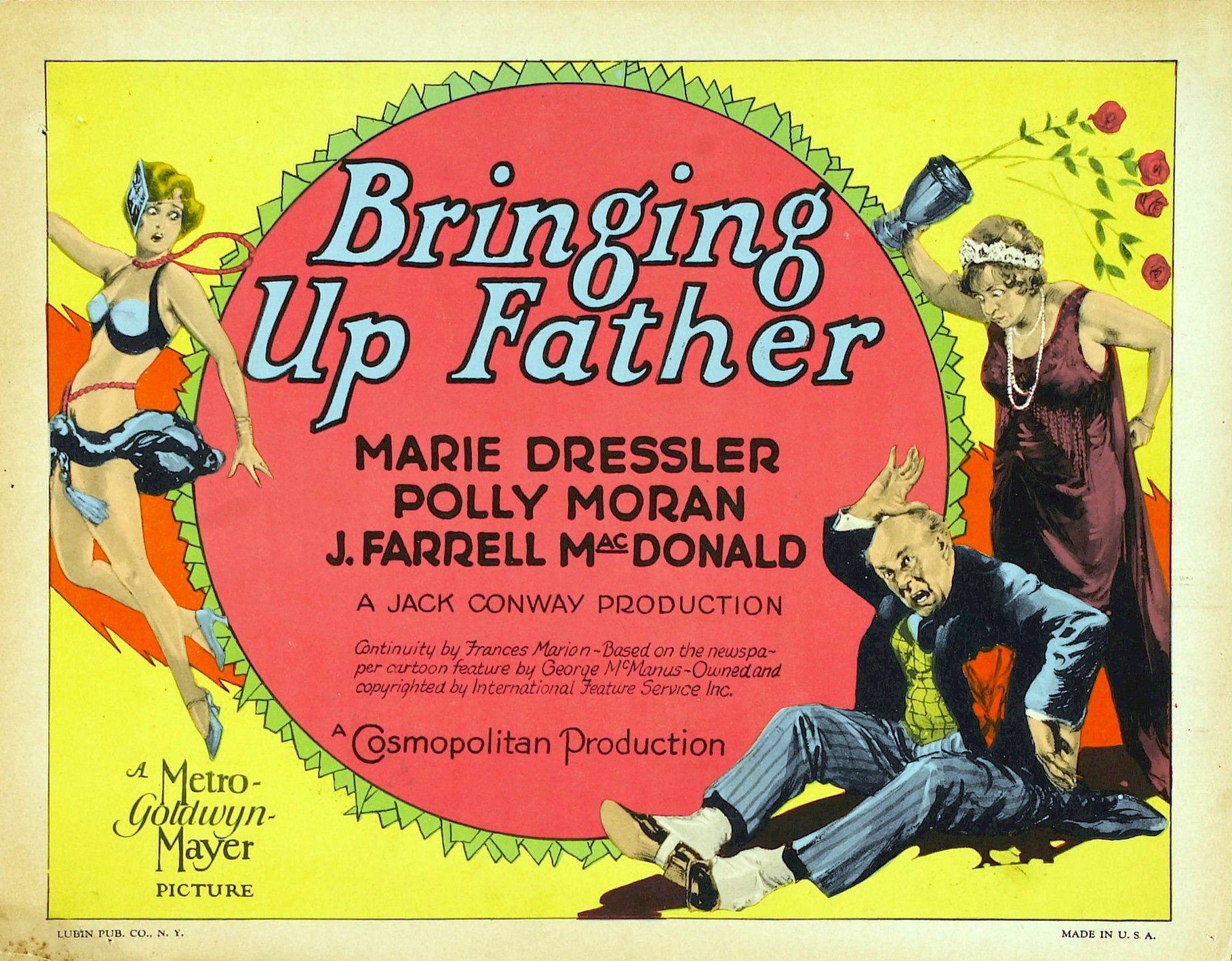
- Lobby card
- Directed by: Jack Conway
- Written by: Frances Marion; George McManus; Ralph Spence
- Starring: Marie Dressler; Polly Moran; J. Farrell MacDonald; Gertrude Olmstead
- Cinematography: William H. Daniels
- Edited by: Margaret Booth
- Production company: Metro-Goldwyn-Mayer
- Distributed by: Metro-Goldwyn-Mayer
- Release date: March 17, 1928
- Running time: 70 minutes
- Country: United States
- Language: Silent (English intertitles)

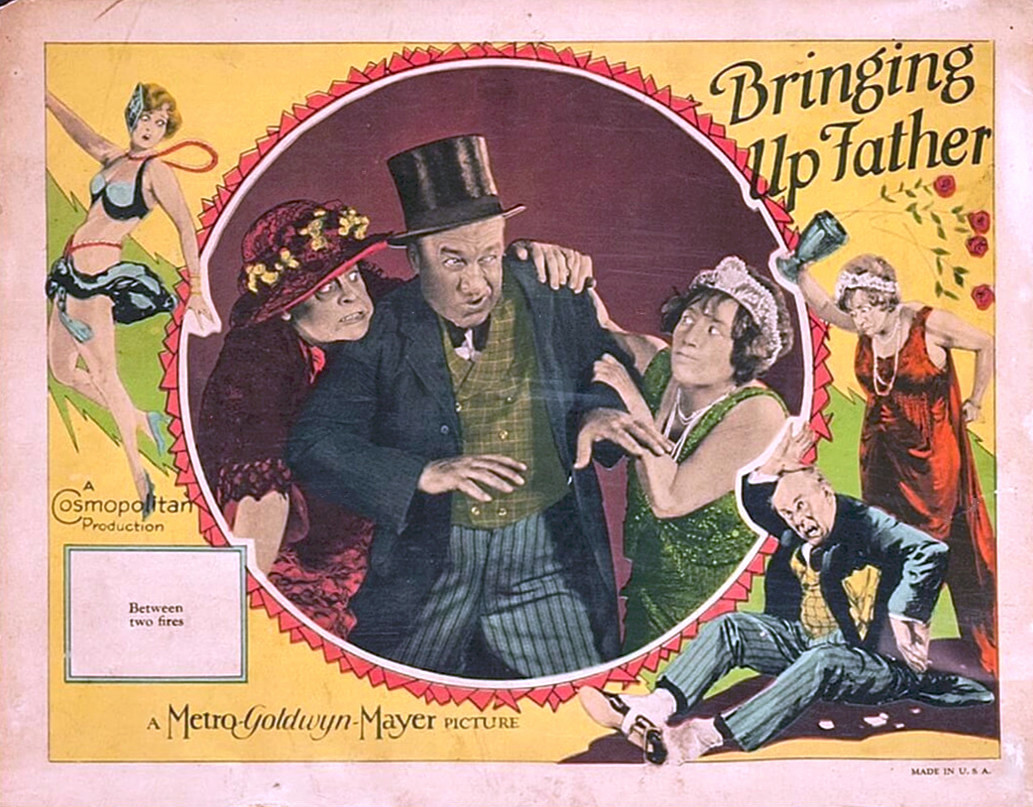
Lobby card with Marie Dressler, J. Farrell MacDonald and Polly Moran

Bringing Up Father is a 1928 American silent comedy film directed by Jack Conway and starring Marie Dressler, Polly Moran, and J. Farrell MacDonald. The film was based on the newspaper comic strip Bringing Up Father by George McManus. It was remade in 1946 as a sound film, proving popular enough for a spin-off of four Jiggs and Maggie films to be made.

== Cast ==
- Marie Dressler as Annie Moore
- Polly Moran as Maggie
- J. Farrell MacDonald as Jiggs
- Jules Cowles as Dinty Moore
- Gertrude Olmstead as Ellen
- Grant Withers as Dennis
- Andrés de Segurola as The Count
- Rose Dione as Mrs. Smith
- David Mir as Oswald
- Tenen Holtz as Ginsberg Feitelbaum

== Preservation ==
A print was donated by MGM to George Eastman House, Rochester New York.

== Bibliography ==
- Drew, Bernard A. Motion Picture Series and Sequels: A Reference Guide. Routledge, 2013.
