= L. William O'Connell =

American cinematographer

- Born: Lewis William O'Connell; July 31, 1890; Chicago, Illinois, USA
- Died: February 1985 (aged 94); Pinopolis, South Carolina, USA
- Years active: circa.1918-1950
- Spouse: Joyce Burns
- Children: Lew (son)

L. William O'Connell (sometimes credited as L.W. O'Connell, and nicknamed "Connie") was an American cinematographer who worked in Hollywood between 1918 and 1950 (starting during the silent era). He frequently worked with directors Howard Hawks and William K. Howard.

== Biography ==
William was born in Chicago, Illinois, to Lewis O'Connell and Caroline Stumpf. He appears to have started his career as a cinematographer around 1918, although he left Los Angeles for a time while serving in World War I, working as an army photographer in Siberia. By 1930, he was the head cameraman at Fox. He married Joyce Burns, a Busby Berkeley dancing girl, and the pair had a son, Lew, together, who became a sound editor in the film industry.

== Selected filmography ==
- Jiggs and Maggie Out West (1950)
- Jiggs and Maggie in Jackpot Jitters (1949)
- Jiggs and Maggie in Court (1948)
- Assigned to Danger (1948)
- Jiggs and Maggie in Society (1947)
- Repeat Performance (1947)
- Lost Honeymoon (1947)
- The Devil on Wheels (1947)
- Bringing Up Father (1946)
- Sweetheart of Sigma Chi (1946)
- The Desert Horseman (1946)
- Blondie's Lucky Day (1946)
- Life with Blondie (1945)
- Adventures of Rusty (1945)
- The Monster and the Ape (1945)
- The Power of the Whistler (1945)
- The Crime Doctor's Courage (1945)
- Dancing in Manhattan (1944)
- The Missing Juror (1944)
- Sergeant Mike (1944)
- One Mysterious Night (1944)
- Cry of the Werewolf (1944)
- Louisiana Hayride (1944)
- Stars on Parade (1944)
- Hey, Rookie (1944)
- The Ghost That Walks Alone (1944)
- Beautiful But Broke (1944)
- The Return of the Vampire (1943)
- Is Everybody Happy? (1943)
- Doughboys in Ireland (1943)
- Passport to Suez (1943)
- Two Señoritas from Chicago (1943)
- The Boy from Stalingrad (1943)
- Murder in Times Square (1943)
- After Midnight with Boston Blackie (1943)
- One Dangerous Night (1943)
- Get Hep to Love (1942)
- Rubber Racketeers (1942)
- Klondike Fury (1942)
- Dangerously They Live (1941)
- The Blonde from Singapore (1941)
- The Stork Pays Off (1941)
- Mystery Ship (1941)
- Money and the Woman (1940)
- Gambling on the High Seas (1940)
- Flight Angels (1940)
- Granny Get Your Gun (1940)
- Calling Philo Vance (1940)
- Smashing the Money Ring (1939)
- Nancy Drew and the Hidden Staircase (1939)
- Nancy Drew... Trouble Shooter (1939)
- The Adventures of Jane Arden (1939)
- Heart of the North (1938)
- Nancy Drew: Detective (1938)
- Broadway Musketeers (1938)
- When Were You Born (1938)
- Little Miss Thoroughbred (1938)
- Mystery House (1938)
- Accidents Will Happen (1938)
- The Invisible Menace (1938)
- She Loved a Fireman (1937)
- West of Shanghai (1937)
- Alcatraz Island (1937)
- White Bondage (1937)
- Public Wedding (1937)
- The Cherokee Strip (1937)
- Land Beyond the Law (1937)
- Penrod and Sam (1937)
- Once a Doctor (1937)
- 1936 King of Hockey (as L.W. O'Connell)
- 1936 Polo Joe (as L. Wm. O'Connell, photography)
- 1936 Bengal Tiger
- 1936/I The Big Noise (as L. Wm. O'Connell)
- 1936 Treachery Rides the Range (photography)
- 1936 Times Square Playboy
- 1936 Road Gang (as L. O'Connell)
- 1935 Man of Iron (as L.W. O'Connell, photography)
- 1935 In Old Kentucky
- 1935 Music Is Magic (as L.W. O'Connell, photography)
- 1935 Here's to Romance (as L.W. O'Connell, photography)
- 1935 Spring Tonic (as L.W. O'Connell, photography)
- 1935 Under Pressure (as L.W. O'Connell)
- 1934 Bachelor of Arts
- 1934 Charlie Chan in London (as L.W. O'Connell, photography)
- 1934 Pursued
- 1934 Baby, Take a Bow (as L.W. O'Connell, photography)
- 1934 Such Women Are Dangerous
- 1934 Stand Up and Cheer! (as L.W. O'Connell, photography)
- 1933 No dejes la puerta abierta (uncredited)
- 1933 "Best of Enemies"
- 1933 Trick for Trick
- 1933 Humanity
- 1933 Olsen's Big Moment
- 1932 Forbidden Trail (as L.W.M. O'Connell, photography)
- 1932 Rackety Rax
- 1932 White Eagle (as L. Wm. O'Connell, photography)
- Forbidden Trail (1932)
- Scarface (1932) (as L.W. O'Connell)
- 1932 The Big Timer (as L. Wm. O'Connell, photography)
- 1932 The Menace (as L. Wm. O'Connell)
- 1931 Maker of Men (as L. Wm. O'Connell, photography)
- 1931 Border Law (as L.W. O'Connell, photographed by)
- 1931 Three Girls Lost
- 1930 The Princess and the Plumber
- 1930 Renegades
- 1930 Wild Company
- 1930 On the Level
- 1930 New Movietone Follies of 1930
- 1930 The Three Sisters
- 1930 Such Men Are Dangerous (as L.W.M. O'Connell)
- 1930 Cameo Kirby
- 1929 Big Time
- 1929 Chasing Through Europe (as L.W. O'Connell)
- 1929 The One Woman Idea
- 1929 Blue Skies (as L.W. O'Connell)
- 1929 Making the Grade
- 1928 4 Devils
- 1928 Fazil
- 1928 A Girl in Every Port (as L.Wm. O'Connell, photographed by)
- 1927 Wolf Fangs
- 1927 Paid to Love
- 1927 Slaves of Beauty
- 1927 The Cradle Snatchers
- 1927 The Monkey Talks (as L. Wm. O'Connell)
- 1927 The Lunatic at Large
- 1926 April Fool
- 1926 Custer of Big Horn
- 1926 No Babies Wanted
- 1926 The Bells
- Sir Lumberjack (1926)
- 1925 The Unchastened Woman
- 1925 My Son
- 1925 The Redeeming Sin (as L.W. O'Connell)
- 1924 The Beloved Brute
- 1924 Behold This Woman
- 1924 Through the Dark
- Fashionable Fakers (1923) (as William O'Connell)
- 1923 An Old Sweetheart of Mine
- The Fourth Musketeer (1923)
- 1923 The Woman of Bronze (as William O'Connell)
- 1922 Enter Madame
- The Hands of Nara (1922) (as L.W. O'Connell)
- 1922 Come on Over
- 1921 They Shall Pay (as William O'Connell)
- 1921 A Broken Doll
- 1921 The Sky Pilot
- 1920 The Little Grey Mouse
- 1920 Suds (as L.W. O'Connell)
- 1918 Missing (as William O'Connell)
