= Zeke Zekley =

American cartoonist

Emil Samuel "Zeke" Zekley (February 11, 1915 – April 28, 2005) was an American cartoonist who worked on several comic strips, notably George McManus's Bringing Up Father.

== Early years ==
Born in Chicago, Zekley grew up in Detroit. His first work as a cartoonist was at age 18 for the Detroit Mirror, which ceased publication in August 1932. He then freelanced, and a ginger ale client kept his cartoons in newspapers, buses and streetcars and on billboards. He moved to California in 1935 and began work with Disney, but after two weeks he was unemployed when the studio closed down for the summer.

== Comic strips ==
Zekley was broke and in dire straits in 1935 when Charles McManus, the brother of George McManus, saw him drawing on a restaurant tablecloth, liked what he saw and decided to introduce Zekley to his brother, kicking off a series of events described by TV writer-producer Mark Evanier:

McManus was one of America's most widely-read cartoonists with his newspaper strip, Bringing Up Father, and he was in desperate need of an assistant. Zeke was quickly hired, and the two men became close friends, with Zeke eventually drawing and even writing more of Jiggs and Maggie than McManus. (Well into his eighties, Zeke was still able to draw those characters in a manner most would find indistinguishable from their maker.) Zeke worked with McManus for years, and it was assumed that when McManus died or retired, Zeke would take complete control of the strip. This did not happen. In 1954, McManus died and King Features Syndicate elected to give the job to an outsider—a move that was unpopular with other strip cartoonists and which caused some of them to make contractual demands about who would take over their strips after they died.

In the 1930s, Zekley was initially paid $50 a week, doing lettering and inking, but he soon began collaborating with McManus on both the penciled art and the writing. During World War II, he was in the Army and drew cartoons for the military. Since he was stationed near McManus, he continued to work on Bringing Up Father throughout the WWII years. During his two decades with McManus, Zekley thought highly of the cartoonist, calling him "my closest pal, mentor, confidant, even surrogate father." After McManus' death in 1954, King Features replaced McManus and Zekley with Vernon Greene.

Zekley worked on other comic strips—Dud Dudley, Paps Younger, Peachy Keen and Popsie—but none of them were particularly successful. He also contributed to the comic book First Love, published by Harvey Comics.

== Murals ==
Zekley created what he called "murals without morals", and in 1940 he was commissioned to paint a mural for Clark Gable's ranch house.

== Television ==
Tab Hunter, in The Tab Hunter Show (1960–61), portrayed Paul Morgan, a 29-year-old cartoonist whose comic strip Bachelor at Large profiled his amorous adventures around Malibu, and Zekley drew the comic strips seen on camera.

== Promotional comic books ==
Zekley started his own company, Sponsored Comics, which created promotional comic books for businesses, including McDonald's. For ten years, he drew special comics for the Squirrel Club. He also worked on PS, The Preventive Maintenance Monthly, a US Army publication created by Will Eisner.

Zekley spent his spare time playing golf and collecting fine art. He died in 2005 and was buried in Hillside Memorial Park and Mortuary in Los Angeles, California.
