= Bringing Up Baby (disambiguation) =

Bringing Up Baby is a 1938 film directed by Howard Hawks.

Bringing Up Baby may also refer to:

- Bringing Up Baby (TV series), the 2007 British television documentary series
- "Bringing Up Baby" (Doctors), a 2005 television episode
- "Bringing Up Baby" (The Golden Girls), a 1987 television episode
- "Bringing Up Baby" (Modern Family), a 2012 television episode
