= Jiggs and Maggie in Court =

1948 film by William Beaudine

- Joe Yule, Rene Riano, and George McManus
- Directed by: William Beaudine
- Written by: Edward F. Cline; Tim Ryan; George McManus; Barney Gerard
- Produced by: Barney Gerard
- Starring: Joe Yule; Renie Riano; George McManus; June Harrison
- Cinematography: L. William O'Connell
- Edited by: Ace Herman
- Music by: Edward J. Kay
- Production company: Monogram Pictures
- Distributed by: Mongram Pictures
- Release date: December 12, 1948
- Running time: 66 minutes
- Country: United States
- Language: English

Jiggs and Maggie in Court is a 1948 American comedy film directed by William Beaudine and starring Joe Yule, Renie Riano and George McManus. It was the second of a series of four films featuring Yule and Riano as the title characters, in a spin-off from the 1946 film Bringing Up Father.

== Plot ==
Angry at being pointed out in the street by people who recognize her cartoon, Maggie takes the cartoonist to court to try to force him to stop drawing her.

== Cast ==
- Joe Yule as Jiggs
- Renie Riano as Maggie
- George McManus as Cartoonist George McManus
- June Harrison as Nora
- Riley Hill as Dennis Malone
- Tim Ryan as Dinty Moore
- Robert Lowell as Hardy Mercer
- Pat Goldin as Dugan
- Dick Ryan as Grogan
- Cliff Clark as Judge Wilson
- Jimmy Aubrey as McGurk
- Jean Fenwick as Mrs. Brinsley-Wellington-Fish
- Frank Austin as Mr. Beaton, an Attorney
- Russell Hicks as Supreme Court Judge
- Chester Clute as Worker
- Grady Sutton as Mr. Twiddle
- Sidney Marion as Scotty
- Charles B. Middleton as Mr. Burton, an Attorney
- Richard Neill as Mr. Bowton, an Attorney
- Kenneth Britton as Mailman Farley
- Francine Faye as Accordionist
