= Jiggs and Maggie in Society =

1947 film by Edward F. Cline

- Directed by: Edward F. Cline
- Written by: Edward F. Cline; George McManus; Barney Gerard
- Produced by: Barney Gerard
- Starring: Joe Yule; Renie Riano; Wanda McKay; Tim Ryan
- Cinematography: L. William O'Connell
- Edited by: Ace Herman
- Music by: Edward J. Kay
- Production company: Monogram Pictures
- Distributed by: Monogram Pictures
- Release date: December 12, 1947
- Running time: 66 minutes
- Country: United States
- Language: English

Jiggs and Maggie in Society is a 1947 American comedy film directed by Edward F. Cline and starring Joe Yule, Renie Riano and Tim Ryan. The film is part of the Jiggs and Maggie series, the first sequel to the 1946 film Bringing Up Father.

== Plot ==
Irish-American matriarch Maggie attempts to gain her family entry into New York's High Society.

== Cast ==
- Joe Yule as Jiggs
- Renie Riano as Maggie Jiggs
- Tim Ryan as Dinty Moore
- Wanda McKay as Millicent Perker
- Lee Bonnell as Van De Graft
- Pat Goldin as Dugan
- Herbert Evans as Jenkins
- June Harrison as Nora Jiggs
- Scott Taylor as Tommy
- Jimmy Aubrey as McGurk
- Thayer Roberts as Henchman Pete
- Richard Irving as Henchman Al
- William Cabanne as George
- Dick Ryan as Grogan
- Constance Purdy as Mrs. Kelsey Chelsea Blackwell
- Edith Leslie as Mary
- Helena Dare as Aggie
- Lesley Farley as Miami
- Betty Blythe as Mrs. Vacuum
- Marcelle Imhof as Mrs. Heavydoe
- Dale Carnegie as himself
- Arthur Murray as himself
- Sheilah Graham as herself

== Bibliography ==
- Drew, Bernard A. Motion Picture Series and Sequels: A Reference Guide. Routledge, 2013.
