= Billy Hagan (burlesque) =

Comedian

- pictured in Cavalcade of Burlesque (1951)
- Born: William Hagedorn; January 29, 1889; San Francisco
- Died: June 10, 1986 (aged 97)
- Other names: Cheese and Crackers
- Occupations: Boxer, burlesque comedian
- Spouse: Anne Toebe (m. 1914)

Billy Hagan (1889–1986) was a burlesque comedian whose catchphrase was "cheese and crackers". The phrase came from his religious German immigrant father, who used it as a substitute for blasphemy. When Hagan died, Milton Berle called him "one of the funniest men on the burlesque circuit. I learned a lot of my expertise from him." According to Ralph G. Allen, one of Hagan's most famous sketches was "Meet Me Around the Corner," which he performed on the Mutual wheel.

Born William Hagedorn in San Francisco, Hagan boxed and was the amateur lightweight champion of California before breaking into show business in 1907. Hagan met his future wife, Anne Toebe (1894-1968), in 1910 when she auditioned as a chorus girl. They married in 1914 and toured together until 1931, when she left show business to raise their son. Toebe regularly performed in a boxing skit with Hagan and was also an early stripteaser. Hagan spent 62 years in show business and often performed at the Trocadero Theatre in Philadelphia.
