= Jiggs and Maggie in Jackpot Jitters =

1949 film by William Beaudine

- Directed by: William Beaudine
- Written by: Edward F. Cline; Tim Ryan; George McManus; Barney Gerard
- Produced by: Barney Gerard
- Starring: Joe Yule; Renie Riano; George McManus; Tim Ryan
- Cinematography: L. William O'Connell
- Edited by: Roy V. Livingston
- Music by: Edward J. Kay
- Production company: Monogram Pictures
- Distributed by: Monogram Pictures
- Release date: August 28, 1949
- Running time: 68 minutes
- Country: United States
- Language: English

Jiggs and Maggie in Jackpot Jitters is a 1949 American comedy film directed by William Beaudine and starring Joe Yule, Renie Riano and George McManus. It was the third of four films in the Jiggs and Maggie film series, spun off from Bringing Up Father (1946). The series follows the adventures of a family of Irish immigrants to the United States.

== Plot ==
Jiggs and Maggie win a racehorse in a competition, but lose large sums of money on it each time it races.

== Cast ==
- Joe Yule as Jiggs
- Renie Riano as Maggie
- George McManus as George McManus
- Tim Ryan as Dinty Moore
- Pat Goldin as Dugan
- June Harrison as Nora
- Sam Hayes as Race Announcer
- Joe Hernandez as Race Announcer
- Jimmy Aubrey as McGurk
- Leon Belasco as Gambler
- Willie Best as Willie
- Betty Blythe as Mrs. Van Belden
- Chester Conklin as Jiggs' Friend
- Joe Devlin as Casey
- Earle Hodgins as Joe Klink
- Eddie Kane as Gambler
- Tom Kennedy as Murphy

== See also ==
- List of films about horses
- List of films about horse racing

== Bibliography ==
- Drew, Bernard A. Motion Picture Series and Sequels: A Reference Guide. Routledge, 2013.
- Marshall, Wendy L. William Beaudine: From Silents to Television. Scarecrow Press, 2005.
