= Bringing Up Father (1946 film) =

1946 film by Edward F. Cline

- Directed by: Edward F. Cline
- Written by: Jerry Warner (screenplay)
- Starring: Joe Yule; Renie Riano
- Cinematography: L. William O'Connell
- Music by: Edward J. Kay
- Distributed by: Monogram Pictures
- Release date: November 23, 1946
- Running time: 65 minutes
- Country: United States
- Language: English

Bringing Up Father is a 1946 American comedy film, based on the comic strip Bringing Up Father by George McManus, about the adventures of the social-climbing Maggie and her long-suffering husband Jiggs.

The Jiggs and Maggie characters had appeared on screen before, both animated and live-action, notably a 1928 Metro-Goldwyn-Mayer silent film directed by Jack Conway.

== Plot ==
One of Maggie's society friends enlists her help in getting an undesirable tenant evicted. The tenant turns out to be saloonkeeper Dinty Moore, whose establishment is frequented by Jiggs. Jiggs and his drinking buddies set out to defend Dinty's turf.

== Cast ==
- Joe Yule as Jiggs
- Renie Riano as Maggie Jiggs
- Tim Ryan as Dinty Moore
- June Harrison as Nora Jiggs
- Wallace Chadwell as Danny
- Tom Kennedy as Murphy
- Laura Treadwell as Mrs. Kermishaw
- William Frambes as Junior Kermishaw
- Pat Goldin as Dugan
- Jack Norton as Norton
- Ferris Taylor as F. Newson Kermishaw
- Tom Dugan as hod carrier
- Joe Devlin as Casey
- Fred Kelsey as Tom
- Charles C. Wilson as Frank
- Bob Carleton as pianist
- George McManus as himself

== Reception ==
Monogram Pictures brought the comic strip to the screen in 1946 for its own film Bringing Up Father, with character actors Joe Yule and Renie Riano personifying the Jiggs and Maggie characters. Yule and Riano fit the roles perfectly, as William R. Weaver of Motion Picture Daily noted: "It is one of the top films of its kind. In the role of Jiggs, and looking enough like him to suit anybody, Joe Yule reels off a sparkling performance, and Renie Riano's portrayal of Maggie is no less gratifying." Box Office Digest noted, with some sheepishness, "Bringing Up Father is the sort of rich, low-down fun that leaves the press reviewers a bit shamefaced. They want to admit that the picture has given them a long hour of rib-tickling entertainment, and they would be willing to see more of the same -- but it may be a bit too lowbrow to confess their enthusiasm too freely. Joe Yule, father of Mickey Rooney, is a sound trouper in his own right, timing and milking his laughs with adroit smoothness. He must step fast, for his opposite is Renie Riano as Maggie, and a trouping lady who can also handle this sort of material."

Monogram, in an unusual move, held the world premiere of Bringing Up Father at New York's all-comedy Laffmovie theater on November 20, 1946. The event was held in New York to commemorate the 34th anniversary of the George McManus comic strip. The studio placed full-page ads in the trade papers, highlighting the excellent business nationwide and urging exhibitors to schedule the film for St. Patrick's Day, 1947.

The successful film launched a series:

- Jiggs and Maggie in Society (1948)
- Jiggs and Maggie in Court (1948)
- Jiggs and Maggie in Jackpot Jitters (1949)
- Jiggs and Maggie Out West (1950)

Cartoonist George McManus appeared as a surprise guest in the first film (Bringing Up Father, 1946) and the last (Jiggs and Maggie Out West, 1950). The series ended upon Joe Yule's death in March 1950; his farewell film was released in April.
