= The Adventures of Jane Arden =

1939 film by Terry O. Morse

- Theatrical release poster
- Directed by: Terry O. Morse
- Screenplay by: Vincent Sherman; Lawrence Kimble; Charles W. Curran
- Based on: Jane Arden (1928--1968) comic strip by Monte Barrett; Russell E. Ross
- Produced by: Bryan Foy
- Starring: Rosella Towne; William Gargan; James Stephenson; Benny Rubin; Dennie Moore; Peggy Shannon
- Cinematography: L. William O'Connell
- Edited by: Harold McLernon
- Music by: Howard Jackson
- Production company: Warner Bros. Pictures
- Distributed by: Warner Bros. Pictures
- Release date: March 18, 1939
- Running time: 58 minutes
- Country: United States
- Language: English

The Adventures of Jane Arden is a 1939 American crime film directed by Terry O. Morse and written by Vincent Sherman, Lawrence Kimble, and Charles W. Curran. The film stars Rosella Towne, William Gargan, James Stephenson, Benny Rubin, Dennie Moore and Peggy Shannon. The film was released by Warner Bros. Pictures on March 18, 1939.

== Plot ==
A girl is killed by a criminal gang. Reporter Arden refuses to write the story, since she does not believe the police have found the real culprit and gets fired for it. Apparently, the firing is fake, and she goes undercover to catch the real killers with stolen jewelry supplied by the investigator.

== Cast ==
- Rosella Towne as Jane Arden
- William Gargan as Ed Towers
- James Stephenson as Dr. George Vanders
- Benny Rubin as Marvin Piermont
- Dennie Moore as Teenie Moore
- Peggy Shannon as Lola Martin
- Edgar Edwards as William 'Bill' Clifton
- Hobart Cavanaugh as Suspect 'Killer'
- Pierre Watkin as Albert Thayer
- Maris Wrixon as Martha Blanton
- John Ridgely as Reporter
