= Renie Riano =

American actress (1899–1971)

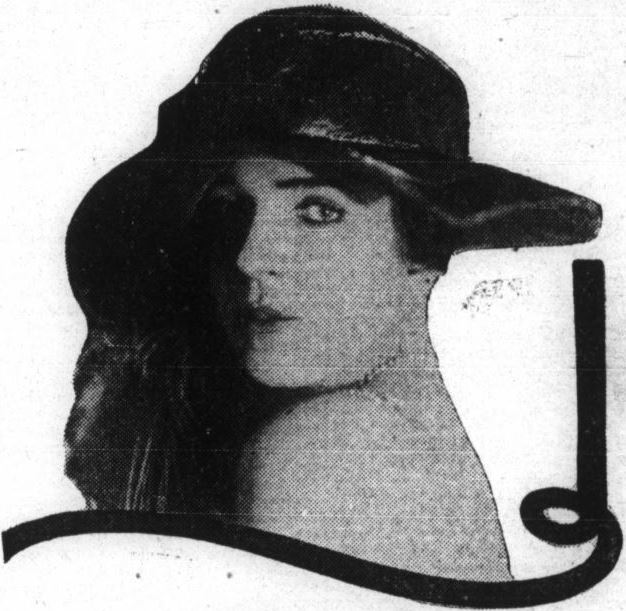
- From a 1923 issue of Variety
- Born: Rene Isabel Riano; August 7, 1899; London, England, UK
- Died: July 3, 1971 (aged 71); Los Angeles, California, U.S.
- Resting place: Westwood Memorial Park
- Occupation: Actress
- Years active: 1937–1970
- Mother: Irene Riano

Renie Isabel Riano (August 7, 1899 – July 3, 1971) was an English-born American actress who, with the exception of the Jiggs and Maggie comedies, had minor roles in 1940s and 1950s films. She was sometimes credited as Reine Riano, Renee Riano, or Rene Riano.

== Biography ==
Riano's parents were Robert and Irene Riano of vaudeville's popular Four Rianos acrobatic act, an eccentric acrobat act which toured the world in vaudeville, variety and music halls.

In 1918, she married an American, John W. Neil, in New Jersey and thereby became an American citizen. Their daughter Jane was born in Philadelphia in 1919.

== Filmography ==
=== Film ===
- Music Box Revue (1923, Pathé film of C. B. Cochran's London production including Riano performing with Ethelind Terry)
- My Dear Miss Aldrich (1937) - Maid (uncredited)
- Tovarich (1937) - Madame Courtois
- You're a Sweetheart (1937) - Mrs. Hepplethwaite
- Outside of Paradise (1938) - Ellen
- Women Are Like That (1938) - Hotel Maid (uncredited)
- Men Are Such Fools (1938) - Mrs. Pinkel
- Four's a Crowd (1938) - Mrs. Jenkins
- The Road to Reno (1938) - Woman Bailiff
- The Storm (1938) - Woman Passenger (uncredited)
- Spring Madness (1938) - Mildred
- Strange Faces (1938) - Mrs. Keller, Landlady
- Nancy Drew... Detective (1938) - Effie Schneider
- Thanks for Everything (1938) - Mrs. Sweeney
- Wings of the Navy (1939) - Train Passenger (uncredited)
- Nancy Drew... Reporter (1939) - Effie Schneider (uncredited)
- Tail Spin (1939) - Chick's Pilot Girlfriend (uncredited)
- Wife, Husband and Friend (1939) - Mrs. Craig
- Dodge City (1939) - President of Prairie League (uncredited)
- Mr. Moto in Danger Island (1939) - Librarian (uncredited)
- Tell No Tales (1939) - Olga - Maid (uncredited)
- Bridal Suite (1939) - Mrs. Pujol (uncredited)
- Nancy Drew... Trouble Shooter (1939) - Effie Schneider
- The Women (1939) - Ugly Saleswoman (uncredited)
- Nancy Drew and the Hidden Staircase (1939) - Effie Schneider
- Honeymoon in Bali (1939) - Head Saleswoman (uncredited)
- Disputed Passage (1939) - Mrs. Riley
- Day-Time Wife (1939) - Miss Briggs
- The Honeymoon's Over (1939) - Annie
- Oh Johnny, How You Can Love (1940) - 'Junior's' Mother (uncredited)
- The Shop Around the Corner (1940) - Customer (uncredited)
- The Man Who Wouldn't Talk (1940) - Lilly Wigham
- High School (1940) - Miss Grace (uncredited)
- The Ghost Comes Home (1940) - Sarah Osborn
- The Doctor Takes a Wife (1940) - Telegraph Operator (uncredited)
- Those Were the Days! (1940) - Hysterical Woman on Streetcar (uncredited)
- Kit Carson (1940) - Miss Pilchard
- A Little Bit of Heaven (1940) - Mrs. Dixon
- Li'l Abner (1940) - Sarah Jones
- Remedy for Riches (1940) - Mrs. Gattle
- Adam Had Four Sons (1941) - Photographer
- You're the One (1941) - Aunt Emma, a.k.a. Faro Fanny
- Ziegfeld Girl (1941) - Annie
- Affectionately Yours (1941) - Mrs. Snell
- Ice-Capades (1941) - Karen Vadja
- Unfinished Business (1941) - Ross's Secretary (uncredited)
- The Smiling Ghost (1941) - Homely Woman (uncredited)
- You Belong to Me (1941) - Minnie
- They Died with Their Boots On (1941) - Nurse (uncredited)
- Whispering Ghosts (1942) - Meg (Stella)
- There's One Born Every Minute (1942) - Miss Aphrodite Phipps
- Blondie for Victory (1942) - Miss Clabber, Cookie's Babysitter (uncredited)
- The Man from Music Mountain (1943) - Christina Kellogg - Housekeeper
- Jam Session (1944) - Ms. Tobin
- Take It or Leave It (1944) - Mrs. Nellie Bramble (uncredited)
- None but the Lonely Heart (1944) - Flo (uncredited)
- Three Is a Family (1944) - Genevieve
- Can't Help Singing (1944) - Spinster Exiting Bathhouse (uncredited)
- A Song for Miss Julie (1945) - Eurydice Lannier
- The Picture of Dorian Gray (1945) - Lady Ruxton (uncredited)
- Anchors Aweigh (1945) - Studio Waitress (uncredited)
- River Gang (1945) - Mrs. Hawkins (uncredited)
- Club Havana (1945) - Mrs. Cavendish
- So Goes My Love (1946) - Emily
- Winter Wonderland (1946) - Mrs. Schuyler-Riggs
- Bad Bascomb (1946) - Lucy Lovejoy
- Bringing Up Father (1946) - Maggie Jiggs
- Jiggs and Maggie in Society (1947) - Maggie Jiggs
- The Time of Your Life (1948) - Lorene Smith (a blind date)
- An Act of Murder (1948) - Mrs. McGuinness (uncredited)
- Jiggs and Maggie in Court (1948) - Maggie Jiggs
- Jiggs and Maggie in Jackpot Jitters (1949) - Maggie Jiggs
- Jiggs and Maggie Out West (1950) - Maggie Jiggs
- As Young as You Feel (1951) - Harpist (uncredited)
- The Barefoot Mailman (1951) - Miss Emily (uncredited)
- Clipped Wings (1953) - WAF Sgt. Anderson
- Bikini Beach (1964) - Old Lady #2
- Pajama Party (1964) - Maid
- The Family Jewels (1965) - Airline Passenger #2
- Three on a Couch (1966) - Old Woman
- Fireball 500 (1966) - Marthy

=== Television ===
- Green Acres (1966) - Mrs. Granite - Molly Turggis (1969) - Stewardess Miss Jones (three different episodes)
- Mayberry RFD (1969) - Aunt Ella
- The Ghost & Mrs. Muir (1970) - Miss Stoddard
- The Partridge Family(1971) - Mrs. Reinbolt
