= Jiggs and Maggie Out West =

1950 film by William Beaudine

- Directed by: William Beaudine
- Written by: Eddie Cline; Adele Buffington; George McManus; Barney Gerard
- Produced by: Barney Gerard
- Starring: Joe Yule; Renie Riano; George McManus; Tim Ryan
- Cinematography: L. William O'Connell
- Edited by: Roy V. Livingston
- Music by: Edward J. Kay
- Production company: Monogram Pictures
- Distributed by: Monogram Pictures
- Release date: April 23, 1950
- Running time: 66 minutes
- Country: United States
- Language: English

Jiggs and Maggie Out West is a 1950 American comedy film directed by William Beaudine and starring Joe Yule, Renie Riano and George McManus. It is the final film in the Jiggs and Maggie film series featuring the adventures of a bickering Irish-American couple.

== Plot ==
Maggie inherits a gold mine in a western town but has trouble finding it. Her homesick husband Jiggs notifies his New York pal Dinty Moore that he has already struck gold, and Dinty rounds up Jiggs's drinking buddies to travel west with him. They arrive at a ghost town, where Dinty reopens the derelict saloon and offers a floor show, wrestling matches, and corned-beef-and-cabbage dinners. An outlaw gang has been discouraging Maggie from hunting for the mine, and finally kidnaps her. Jiggs and his buddies set out to rescue her, and finally they are brought before the gang's leader. It turns out to be cartoonist George McManus himself, who explains away the unresolved story: the "gold" is in his ink bottle, and the characters are "mine."

== Production ==
Producer Barney Gerard announced Jiggs and Maggie Out West in July 1949 for production "in early fall", but it didn't go before the cameras until December. The anticlimactic ending was patched together, with McManus filmed alone and addressing the camera. Director William Beaudine shot around him by having Jiggs and Maggie stand in front of a seated body double for McManus, with Dinty and his buddies in separate shots. The close-ups of McManus were then fitted into the action.

The film was previewed on March 16, 1950. Leading player Joe Yule died two weeks later, and his farewell film was released nationally on April 23, 1950.

== Cast ==
- Joe Yule as Jiggs
- Renie Riano as Maggie
- George McManus as George McManus
- Tim Ryan as Dinty Moore
- Jim Bannon as Snake-Bite Carter
- Riley Hill as Bob Carter
- Pat Goldin as Dugan
- June Harrison as Nora
- Henry Kulky as Bomber Kulkowich
- Billy "Sailor" Vincent as Wrestler
- Terry McGinnis as Cyclone McGinnis
- Billy Griffith as Lawyer Blakely

== Bibliography ==
- Marshall, Wendy L. William Beaudine: From Silents to Television. Scarecrow Press, 2005.
