= Joe Yule =

American actor (1892–1950)

- Yule in Air Raid Wardens (1943)
- Born: Ninnian Joseph Yule; April 30, 1892; Glasgow, Scotland
- Died: March 30, 1950 (aged 57); Hollywood, California, U.S.
- Occupation: Actor
- Years active: 1912–1950
- Spouse: Nellie W. Carter (m. 1919; sep. 1924)
- Children: Mickey Rooney

Ninnian Joseph Yule (April 30, 1892 – March 30, 1950) was a Scottish-American burlesque and vaudeville actor who later appeared in many films as a character actor. He starred alongside Renie Riano in the Jiggs and Maggie film series. Yule was the father of actor Mickey Rooney.

== Biography ==
Ninnian Joseph Yule was born in the Hutchesontown district of Glasgow on April 30, 1892, the son of Elizabeth (née McKell; 1866–1919) and boiler maker Ninnian Yule (1866–1943). He immigrated to the United States with his parents on the steamship Bolivia, arriving at the Port of New York on August 2, 1892. He was one of seven children. They settled in Brooklyn's Greenpoint neighborhood. He was performing in stock theater in Brooklyn by age eight. As a teenager, Yule performed in local vaudeville theatres and was later booked into leading burlesque wheels, including the Columbia Burlesque Wheel, where he adopted the stage name Joe Yule.

In 1919, Yule married fellow vaudevillian Nellie W. Carter, a native of Kansas City, Missouri. In 1920, while they were appearing together in a Brooklyn production of A Gaiety Girl, their son Ninnian Joseph Yule Jr. was born. He later became a Hollywood actor under the name Mickey Rooney. The Yules separated in 1924 during a slump in vaudeville, and Carter moved with her son to Hollywood in 1925. Yule was naturalized as an American citizen in Los Angeles on May 14, 1943.

== Character actor ==
Mickey Rooney was one of Metro-Goldwyn-Mayer's biggest stars, and he arranged for his father to sign an MGM contract in November 1938. Yule joined the MGM stock company. The pay was lower than for stars or featured players, but the work was steadier, with stock actors being called upon to take small roles in everything the studio produced: important "A" features, lesser "B" features (which were still the most expensive in the industry), two-reel dramas like the Crime Does Not Pay series, and one-reel comedies like the Our Gang shorts. Joe Yule, with his memorable facial features, became a familiar presence in dozens of MGM productions through 1946.

Monogram Pictures then hired Yule to star in its new Bringing Up Father comedies, known informally as the Jiggs and Maggie series. Yule was ideally cast as the trouble-prone Irish character of the comic strip, and this was his only starring role in motion pictures. He remained with the series until his death.

Monogram released only one Jiggs and Maggie feature per year, and the studio's speedy shooting schedules (usually no more than two weeks per picture) allowed Yule to accept a major role on the New York stage. He portrayed Finian McLonergan in the Broadway musical Finian's Rainbow (1947).

Joe Yule died of a heart attack on March 30, 1950 in Hollywood, California. He was 57. Rooney arranged to have his father buried near Rooney's friend and longtime acting colleague, Wallace Beery, who had died the year before. He wrote, "I thought it was fitting that these two comedians should rest in peace, side by side."

== Filmography ==
- The Great Ziegfeld (1936) as World's Fair Barker (uncredited)
- Idiot's Delight (1939) as Vaudeville Comic (uncredited)
- Sudden Money (1939) as Joe
- They All Come Out (1939) as County Jail Inmate (uncredited)
- Fast and Furious (1939) as One of the Actors (uncredited)
- The Secret of Dr. Kildare (1939) as Lunch Room Counterman (uncredited)
- Judge Hardy and Son (1939) as Munk, the Tire Man (uncredited)
- Broadway Melody of 1940 (1940) as Dan (uncredited)
- Forty Little Mothers (1940) as Counterman at Diner (uncredited)
- Florian (1940) as Barker (uncredited)
- Phantom Raiders (1940) as Sailor on Blown Up Ship (uncredited)
- New Moon (1940) as Maurice
- Boom Town (1940) as Ed Murphy
- Strike Up the Band (1940) as Ticket Seller at Fair (uncredited)
- Dulcy (1940) as Attendant at Resort Dock (uncredited)
- Third Finger, Left Hand (1940) as Waiter (uncredited)
- Gallant Sons (1940) as Mike, Who Whistles the Tune (uncredited)
- Go West (1940) as Joe, the Crystal Palace Bartender (uncredited)
- Maisie Was a Lady (1941) as First Carnival Barker (uncredited)
- The Wild Man of Borneo (1941) as Jerry (scenes deleted)
- Come Live With Me (1941) as Sleepy Neighbor (uncredited)
- Blonde Inspiration (1941) as Street Cleaner (uncredited)
- The Trial of Mary Dugan (1941) as Sign Painter (uncredited)
- I'll Wait for You (1941) as Little 'Butch'
- Billy the Kid (1941) as Milton
- The Get-Away (1941) as McMannis, a Bartender (uncredited)
- Sucker List (1941, Short) as Man Wanting Match (uncredited)
- Married Bachelor (1941) as Waiter (scenes deleted)
- Shadow of the Thin Man (1941) as Henry, the Racetrack Watchman (uncredited)
- Kathleen (1941) as Sign Poster
- Babes on Broadway (1941) as Mason, Aide to Reed (uncredited)
- Nazi Agent (1942) as Barney (uncredited)
- Woman of the Year (1942) as Building Superintendent (uncredited)
- Born to Sing (1942) as Ed Collera
- Fingers at the Window (1942) as Citizen (uncredited)
- Grand Central Murder (1942) as Stagehand (uncredited)
- Maisie Gets Her Man (1942) as Elevator Operator (uncredited)
- Jackass Mail (1942) as Barky
- Calling Dr. Gillespie (1942) as Passerby in Detroit (uncredited)
- The Omaha Trail (1942) as Ericson (uncredited)
- Panama Hattie (1942) as Waiter (uncredited)
- Mighty Lak a Goat (1942, Short) as Matinee Movie Patron (uncredited)
- For Me and My Gal (1942) as Fred (uncredited)
- Famous Boners (1942, Short) as George O'Flanagan (uncredited)
- Harrigan's Kid (1943) as Jones (uncredited)
- Air Raid Wardens (1943) as Air Raid Warden Recruit (uncredited)
- Presenting Lily Mars (1943) as Mike, Stage Doorman (uncredited)
- A Stranger in Town (1943) as Barber (uncredited)
- Three Hearts for Julia (1943) as Taxicab Driver (uncredited)
- Swing Shift Maisie (1943) as Clarence, Ice Cream Vendor (uncredited)
- I Dood It (1943) as Theatre Doorman (uncredited)
- Lost Angel (1943) as Tenant (uncredited)
- Radio Bugs (1944, Short) as Dental Patient (uncredited)
- Two Girls and a Sailor (1944) as The Carpenter (uncredited)
- Meet the People (1944) as Shorty (uncredited)
- Bathing Beauty (1944) as Bartender (uncredited)
- The Seventh Cross (1944) as Prisoner at Concentration Camp (uncredited)
- Kismet (1944) as Bath House Attendant (uncredited)
- The Thin Man Goes Home (1944) as Barber (uncredited)
- Nothing But Trouble (1944) as Police Officer (uncredited)
- The Picture of Dorian Gray (1945) as Stage Manager (uncredited)
- Murder in the Music Hall (1946) as Joe, Stage Doorman (uncredited)
- Bringing Up Father (1946) as Jiggs
- The Mighty McGurk (1946) as Immigrant from Ireland (uncredited)
- That's My Gal (1947) as Comic (uncredited)
- Magic Town (1947) as Radio Comic in Montage (uncredited)
- Jiggs and Maggie in Society (1947) as Jiggs
- Jiggs and Maggie in Court (1948) as Jiggs
- Jiggs and Maggie in Jackpot Jitters (1949) as Jiggs
- Jiggs and Maggie Out West (1950) as Jiggs (final film role)
