= George McManus =

American cartoonist (1884–1954)

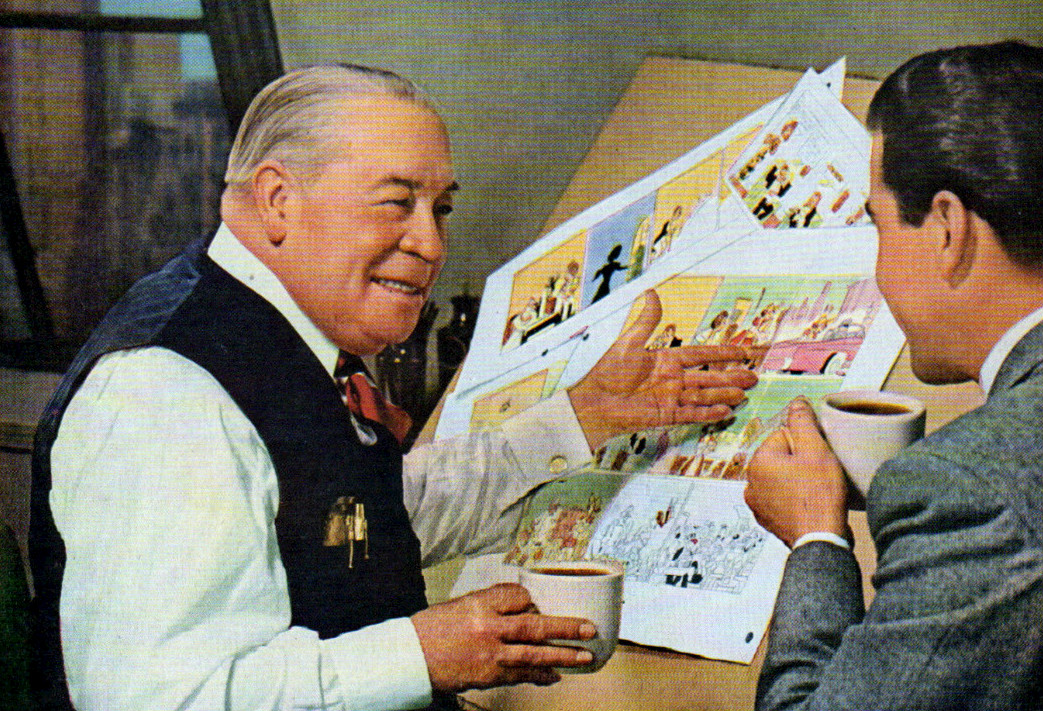
- McManus having a coffee in 1952
- Born: January 23, 1884 St. Louis, Missouri, U.S.
- Died: October 22, 1954 (aged 70) Santa Monica, California, U.S.
- Area: Cartoonist
- Notable works: Bringing Up Father
- Spouse: Florence Bergere

George McManus (January 23, 1884 – October 22, 1954) was an American cartoonist best known as the creator of Irish immigrant Jiggs and his wife Maggie, the main characters of his syndicated comic strip, Bringing Up Father.

== Biography ==
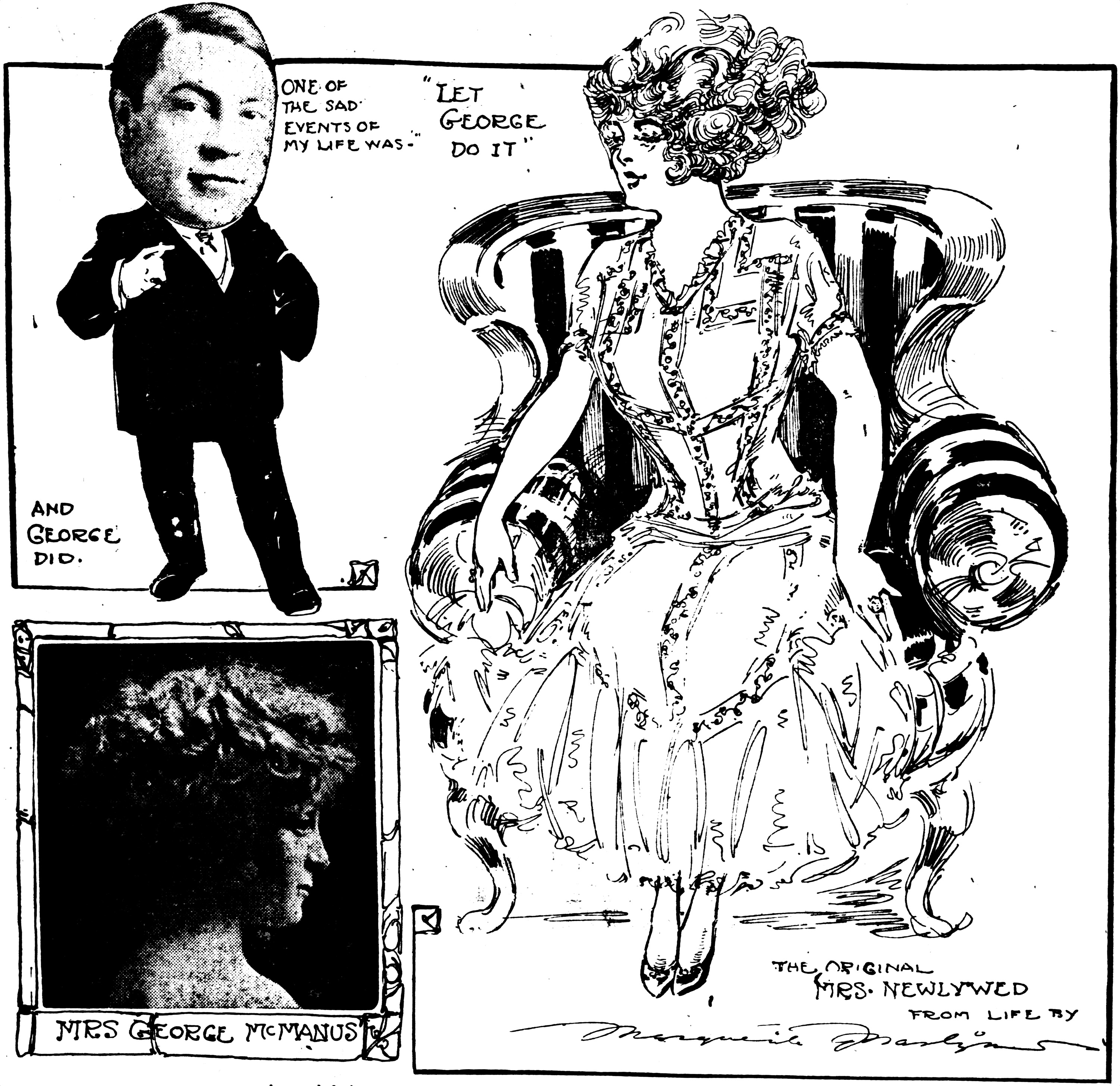
George McManus and Florence Bergere; composite by Marguerite Martyn for the St. Louis Post-Dispatch, 1910

Born in St. Louis, Missouri, of Irish parents, McManus had an innate gift for drawing and a sense of humor. He recalled an incident when he was in high school: "My teacher sent home to my parents a picture I had drawn of a classmate named Sweeney. 'This is what your boy has been doing,' the teacher wrote, icily. I laid the note in Pop's lap and headed wearily for the woodshed. But Pop, instead, put on his hat and coat and went to the editor of The Republican. He showed [my drawing of] Sweeney to the editor. Next day I had a job on The Republican at $5 a week—as an errand boy."

At The Republican, he created his first comic strip, Alma and Oliver. In 1904, after winning $3000 at the racetrack, he went to New York City and a job with the prestigious New York World, where he worked on several short-lived comic strips, including Snoozer, The Merry Marcelene, Ready Money Ladies, Cheerful Charlie, Nibsy the Newsboy in Funny Fairyland, Panhandle Pete and Let George Do It.

== Comic strip evolution ==
Card by George McManus featuring his Bringing Up Father characters

In 1904, McManus created the first American family comic strip, The Newlyweds, about an elegant young couple and their baby Snookums. The popularity of the strip prompted the management of The New York American to invite McManus to work for their newspaper. He began working for them in 1912. Renaming The Newlyweds as Their Only Child, he continued that strip and began other daily strips: Rosie's Beau, Love Affairs of a Mutton Head, Spareribs And Gravy and Bringing Up Father.

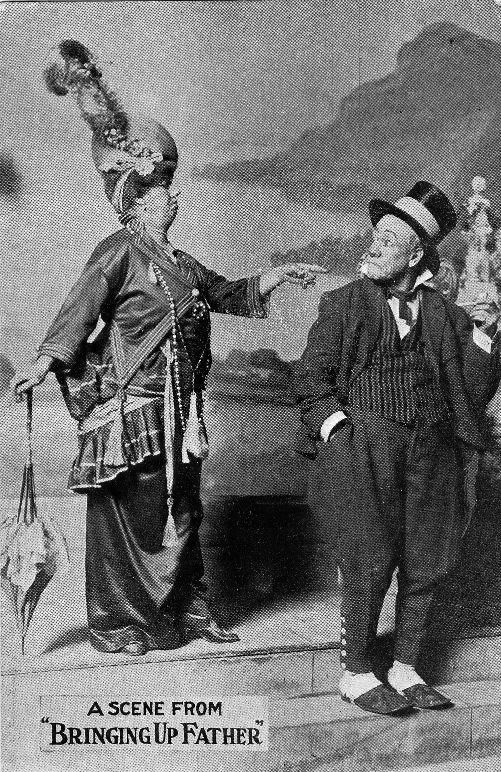
Maggie and Jiggs in a scene from the 1914 play

Syndicated internationally by King Features Syndicate, Bringing Up Father achieved great success and was produced by McManus from 1913 until his death, when Vernon Greene and Frank Fletcher replaced him. McManus was inspired by The Rising Generation, a musical comedy by William Gill that he had seen as a boy in St. Louis, Missouri's Grand Opera House, where his father was manager. In The Rising Generation, Irish-American bricklayer Martin McShayne (played by the fat Irish comedian Billy Barry in the stage production McManus saw) becomes a wealthy contractor, yet his society-minded wife and daughter were ashamed of him and his buddies, prompting McShayne to sneak out to join his pals for poker. McManus knew Barry and used him as the basis for his drawings of Jiggs. Two years before his death, McManus said that Bringing Up Father had earned him $12,000,000 during his lifetime.

McManus's wife, the former Florence Bergere, was the model for daughter Nora in Bringing Up Father. Zeke Zekley was his assistant on the comic strip from 1935 to 1954.

== Screen adaptation ==
Monogram Pictures brought the comic strip to the screen in 1946 for the film Bringing Up Father, with character actors Joe Yule and Renie Riano personifying the Jiggs and Maggie characters. Yule and Riano fit the roles perfectly, as William R. Weaver of Motion Picture Daily noted: "It is one of the top films of its kind. In the role of Jiggs, and looking enough like him to suit anybody, Joe Yule reels off a sparkling performance, and Renie Riano's portrayal of Maggie is no less gratifying."

Yule and Riano made one film annually until 1950, when Yule died. George McManus himself appeared as a surprise guest in the first film (Bringing Up Father, 1946) and the last (Jiggs and Maggie Out West, 1950).

== Awards ==
For his contribution to American humor, Roanoke College honored McManus with an honorary degree, Doctor of Humane Letters.

== Later life ==
During the 1940s, McManus lived at 8905 Sunset Boulevard in Hollywood. He died in 1954 in Santa Monica, California and was interred in the Woodlawn Cemetery in The Bronx, New York City.

== Cultural legacy ==
Jiggs serves as insignia of the U.S. Air Force's 11th Bomb Squadron, with whom McManus served during World War I. In 1995, the comic strip was one of 20 included in the "Comic Strip Classics" series of commemorative United States postage stamps.

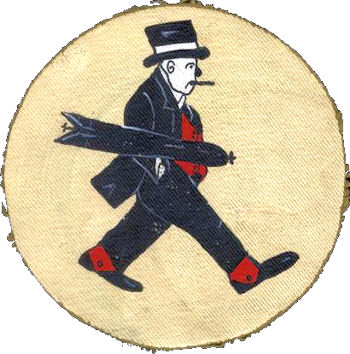
Mr Jiggs version in World War I

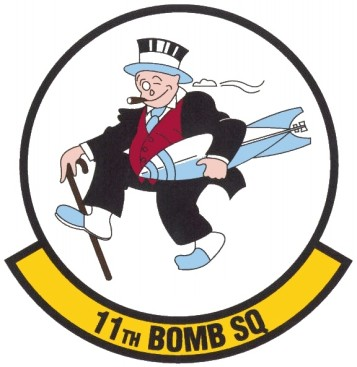
Mr Jiggs version in World War II

== See also ==
- Jiggs dinner
