= Reginald LeBorg =

Austrian-American film director (1902–1989)

- Born: Harry Gröbel (Harry Groebel); 11 December 1902; Vienna, Austria
- Died: 25 March 1989 (aged 86); Los Angeles, California, U.S.
- Occupation: Film director
- Years active: 1936–1974
- Children: 1

Reginald LeBorg (Note: His adopted surname has been spelled both Le Borg and LeBorg. This article follows the LeBorg spelling used in the biography by Wheeler Winston Dixon, which included extended interviews with the director and is thus closer to the subject's own usage.) (born Harry Gröbel; 11 December 1902 – 25 March 1989) was an Austrian-American film director. He directed 68 films between 1936 and 1974.

LeBorg is perhaps best known for the horror films he made at Universal studios in the 1940s for the Inner Sanctum Mystery series, including Calling Dr. Death (1943) and Weird Woman (1944).

One of the most active directors in Hollywood's industry of B movie on a budget, LeBorg earned recognition from film critics for his style and meticulous approach despite poor screenplays.

LeBorg's accomplishment is the scope of his oeuvre, spanning every film genre, including opera, musicals, crime drama, romantic comedy, westerns, science fiction and horror.

== Early life and education ==
Harry Gröbel (Harry Groebel) was born and raised in Vienna, Austria. His father, Julius, was a wealthy banker-financier, art collector, and a patron of the arts; his mother, Regina Joseph Burte, was a musically talented housewife. According to her son, she was a "strong woman". Harry had two younger brothers. The family owned an ancestral estate outside Vienna where racing horses were bred, as well as an aviation company and other investments in the United States. He completed his primary schooling and studied piano and violin at home. He earned a degree in political economy at the University of Vienna and later attended the Arnold Schonberg's Composition Seminar for a year.

== Career in finance: 1923–1929 ==
Groebel was deployed by his father to oversee the family banking concerns around Europe in the early 1920s, spending two years at Banque de Pays de L'Europe Centrale. He habitually frequented theatres, neglecting his duties. In Paris he performed sketches at the Folies Bergère. He lived in New York City off and on between 1923 and 1929 representing his father's financial interests and working at brokerage houses. As a rich 20-something, LeBorg mixed with figures from the music and entertainment world, including George Gershwin. He also took courses in literature at Columbia University.

When the stock market crashed in the Panic of 1929, the family lost their fortune. His father, who was advanced in years and in poor health, died not long afterwards. Groebel abandoned finance and began looking for work as a playwright or an off-Broadway actor in New York, without success. In 1930, he returned to Europe and studied with impresario Max Reinhardt at his school in Vienna, staging a number of operas and musical comedies in Central Europe.

== Film career ==
In 1934, Groebel moved to Hollywood, California to seek employment as a screenwriter, adopting the forename "Reginald" (from his mother's name) and spelling his family name backwards to create the professional surname "LeBorg".

Columbia Pictures hired him to stage and direct the opera scenes for the musical Love Me Forever (1934) starring opera diva Grace Moore. He was enlisted to stage other opera scenes for a number of major and independent studios. During this period he studied the craft of film editing and occasionally played bit parts in films directed by Josef von Sternberg.

On 27 July 1937, LeBorg became a US citizen. In his naturalization petition, he changed his name legally from Harry Groebel to Reginald LeBorg.

== Soundies and big band swing shorts: 1937–1942 ==
Between 1936 and 1942, LeBorg directed a number of soundies, featuring 3-minute musical performances viewed on special jukebox machines. Popular in arcades and restaurants, LeBorg was paid $100 for each short. While at Metro-Goldwyn-Mayer, LeBorg was also tasked with making Big band 10-minute shorts, such as Swing Banditry (1936) and No Place Like Rome (1937). In 1936 he wrote the scenario for Heavenly Music (1943), which later won the Academy Award for "Best Short Subject - 2 Reel" in 1943.

=== Second Unit director ===
From 1937 to 1939, LeBorg served as Second Unit director on five films, including Selznick's Intermezzo (1939) starring Ingrid Bergman. The scenes in which Bergman "plays" a piano are dubbed by a professional musician. LeBorg instructed her in body language and technique to create a convincing appearance seated at a "mute" piano. LeBorg also did the second unit musical numbers for A Day at the Races (1937) starring the Marx Brothers, directed by Sam Wood.

== Military service: 1942–1943 ==
In 1941, LeBorg joined Universal Pictures to film 20-minute swing band shorts, hoping to be promoted to feature film director. (See Directorial Credits below) Although in his early 40s, the unmarried LeBorg was drafted into the army in 1942 and served by making films for the Office of War Information and the Army Training division. In 1943, he was discharged and received a citation for his service. He returned to Universal studios and was given his first assignment as a house director: She's for Me (1943) starring David Bruce and Jeanette MacDonald. A minor low-budget success, Universal next assigned him to direct a series of films "for which he would be best known", the Inner Sanctum horror pictures.

== Universal Pictures: 1943–1945 ==
=== Inner Sanctum Mystery series ===
When Blue Network began airing the popular Inner Sanctum Mystery on radio in 1941, Universal Pictures acquired the screen rights from Simon & Schuster to adapt the series to film. LeBorg was reluctant to take on this assignment of adapting this series, preferring to make musicals. Indeed, "he openly disdained his work on the Inner Sanctum series." His Inner Sanctum oeuvre consists of five films: Calling Dr. Death (1943), Dead Man's Eyes (1944) and Weird Woman (1944). Aside from his proficiency in delivering these films, Universal recognized LeBorg's talent for creating the "proper mood and atmosphere" in the horror genre, a talent that manifested itself at the box office. He also did works for other series by Universal, such as Jungle Woman (1944) and The Mummy's Ghost (1944), The popularity of these pictures was such that LeBorg became "typed as a horror director", much to his disgust.

Lon Chaney, Jr., famous for his role as Lawrence Talbot in The Wolf Man (1941), starred in four of these films. An actor of limited expressive range, he delivered some of his most "disciplined performances" under LeBorg's direction. Ironically, despite LeBorg's low opinion of his Inner Sanctum films, they enjoyed perennial revivals in television re-runs in subsequent years.

LeBorg's open contempt for his horror films, expressed at film industry social gatherings, gained him a reputation as a malcontent among studio executives.

=== "Program" director ===
Universal typically assigned LeBorg to direct program pictures. His acumen for delivering these "on time and under budget" was prized at Universal, and LeBorg was ranked a "house director." As such, LeBorg performed in a two-tier system, in which studios offered a double-feature per theatre showing: a higher budget production, followed by a low-budget program. Biographer Wheeler Winston Dixon notes the implications for LeBorg's artistic aspirations as a filmmaker:

Because of his unremitting efficiency on the set, Reginald LeBorg in a sense worked against his own best interests - he was never given a real 'A' picture because he was so indispensable to the 'B' unit."

LeBorg was an avid screenplay writer, spending months or more developing projects, only to have studio executives reject the material after encouraging his efforts. Dixon notes that LeBorg was well aware of the mediocrity of the scripts he was offered. Nonetheless, LeBorg was serious-minded in his efforts to make the most of the material within the imposed financial and time constraints.

San Diego, I Love You (1944): An opportunity to escape his low-budget B movie projects materialized when LeBorg was allowed to film a comedy based on a screenplay written in part by Ruth McKenney, author of My Sister Eileen (1938). San Diego, I Love You (1944) was LeBorg's biggest budget film to date. LeBorg adroit handling of the material and the actors, including Louise Allbritton, Edward Everett Horton and famous silent film star Buster Keaton, promised to be a success. Universal, however, was unwilling to invest in an outstanding comic talent for the lead male role (LeBorg had requested Cary Grant), and Universal failed to adequately promote the film. The production stalled at the box office, and LeBorg returned to making "B" films. In retrospect, LeBorg regarded San Diego, I Love You as the work of which he was most proud.

The quality of LeBorg's script offerings subsequently declined, reflecting Universal's low opinion of his recent efforts. After completing Destiny (1944) LeBorg rebelled against the front office, demanding better resources and scripts. Universal responded with an "unambitious programmer," imposing a budget and cast that resulted in Honeymoon Ahead (1945). Though completing the film with dispatch, LeBorg repeated his request for better material, and Universal dismissed him from the studio.

=== Freelance director: 1946–1974 ===
After LeBorg's departure from Universal he proceeded to make films with the "low-budget" arm of United Artists, Comet Productions, as well as "Poverty row" studios such as Monogram Pictures and Producers Releasing Corporation (PRC). LeBorg recalled: "It was a disgrace. I never got the big chance again." His Comet productions included "the cheerful, if unremarkable" Susie Steps Out, and a comic strip adaption in Little Iodine (both 1946). He also completed his first color film The Adventures of Don Coyote in 1947.

At Monogram, LeBorg made ten feature films from 1946 to 1951. Notable are the seven films in the Joe Palooka series, based on the popular Ham Fisher comic book about a young pugilist. LeBorg undertook the Palooka project determined to make the boxing scenes realistic, achieved in part by cinematographer Benjamin H. Kline. Actor Joe Kirkwood, Jr. as Palooka was supported by Joe Sawyer, Elisha Cook, Jr. (known for his role in the 1941 The Maltese Falcon), and comic Knobby Walsh. Boxing champions Joe Louis, Henry Armstrong, and Manuel Ortiz appear in cameos. Though the series remained in demand for a number of years, these films are "all but forgotten today."

LeBorg completed a single picture for the poverty row studio PRC: Philo Vance's Secret Mission (1947). Though perhaps the best of PRC's three adaptions of the character created by S. S. Van Dine, LeBorg left PRC to join Columbia Pictures "B" unit to make a programmer, Port Said (1948), set in Turkey in the early 20th century involving foreign intrigue. Returning to Monogram, LeBorg directed three "routine" entertainments featuring Leo Gorcey and The Bowery Boys: Trouble Makers (1948), Fighting Fools (1949), and Hold That Baby! (1949). In 1950, LeBorg was afforded a single-movie contract with Universal to direct in color a "B" western, Wyoming Mail (1950), starring Alexis Smith with a talented supporting cast. The film garnered little critical attention. At Monogram, LeBorg directed another lackluster western, Young Daniel Boone (1950) and completed the Joe Palooka series, the latter which LeBorg felt "was becoming almost as much a trap as the horror movies." The next producer who engaged him as a free-lancer was Robert Lippert, for whom LeBorg directed three films, including a musical-comedy, G. I. Jane. The facilities provided by Lippert studios were substandard and the film's "cheap" appearance is indicative. Models, Inc. (1952) was the only film LeBorg made at Mutual Film, starring Howard Duff and Coleen Gray. A story of the demi-monde world of prostitution, it was shot in shadow by cinematographer Stanley Cortez. The production received favorable reviews but few box office receipts

LeBorg returned to Lippert to direct a vehicle for rising 'sex-symbol' Barbara Payton in Bad Blonde (1953), also released as The Flanagan Boy and This Woman is Trouble. The production was filmed in England with Hammer Film Productions; LeBorg reported that he enjoyed working with the British crew. The "routine" picture suffered from Hammer's "draconian cost-consciousness". Actress Paulette Goddard, who co-starred in Charlie Chaplin's 1936 Modern Times, was the leading lady in Lippert's Sins of Jezebel (1953). Despite the color cinematography by Gilbert Warrenton, the picture "lacks any real distinction." LeBorg completed his work for Lippert with a "routine western", The Great Jesse James Raid (1953). LeBorg decided to finance a picture with United Artists and invested his own money in the project: The White Orchid (1954). He wrote and cast the color feature about an archeologist (William Lundigan), and a news photographer (Peggie Castle), who search for the surviving remnants of an indigenous culture in the jungles of Mexico. The commercial success was just sufficient to pay off his creditors; LeBorg accrued no profit, and returned to contract directing.

Producers Aubrey Schenck and Howard W. Koch convinced LeBorg to return the horror genre with The Black Sleep (1956) for Bel-Air Productions, a B unit subsidiary of United Artists. Also titled Dr. Cadman's Secret, the movie featured a who's who of Gothic character actors: Basil Rathbone, Lon Chaney, Jr., John Carradine, Tor Johnson, and Bela Lugosi (in one of his final roles). When the film proved a genuine box office success, Schenck and Koch prepared another project in which LeBorg directed iconic horror actor Boris Karloff. Voodoo Island (1957) was filmed on the Hawaiian island of Kauai. The film, "lacking in suspense and imagination," also suffered from slip-shod executions of the special effects.

LeBorg, who scorned his identification with horror pictures dating from the Inner Sanctum work in the 1940s, was troubled that he was trending again into that genre. In an effort to escape, he directed two westerns in tandem for United Artists: War Drums and The Dalton Girls, both in 1957. War Drums, a "patronizing and mechanical" recounting an episode in the life of Apache leader Mangus Coloradas, stars Lex Barker. The Dalton Girls, is an "overlooked and unusual addition" to LeBorg's oeuvre. Considered an early Feminist western, and starring Merry Anders, Lisa Davis, and Penny Edwards, it concerns the exploits of the daughters of Dalton Gang members following summary executions at the hands of vigilantes. The young women adopt the methods and the clothing of their fathers, successfully robbing and exchanging brutality for brutality with the male authorities who seek to suppress them.

LeBorg did not win another directing contract for several years, until producer Edward Small offered him a science fiction script for The Flight That Disappeared (1961). The movie reflects social anxieties concerning Cold War fears of nuclear devastation and calls for nuclear disarmament. LeBorg accepted the project exclusively for the money, and declined to acknowledge the film. The efficiency and speed with which he completed the movie allowed it a small profit, convincing Small to sign LeBorg to direct Deadly Duo (1962), starring Craig Hill and Marcia Henderson, in a dual role. Pleased with LeBorg's work, Small offered him a horror film, Diary of a Madman (1963), starring Vincent Price as the demented Simon Cordier. LeBorg was attracted to the project due to the literary origins of the screenplay, a short story by 19th century French author Guy de Maupassant. Enjoying a "lavish budget" by LeBorg standards, with set designs by Daniel Haller, was a box office success. Diary of a Madman is perhaps the most admired work of LeBorg's late career.

LeBorg's next project was for 20th Century Fox's "B" production unit, a drama filmed in England: The Eyes of Annie Jones (1964). Starring Richard Conte and Francesca Annis, the picture was quickly dropped from screenings shortly after it opened. LeBorg's penultimate directoral assignment was limited to shooting night-time, outdoor "atmosphere" sequences for the horror movie House of the Black Death (1965). Harold Daniels directed the production which starred John Carradine, Lon Chaney, Jr. and Jerome Thor; LeBorg "had no creative control over the final film." Not until 1974 did LeBorg direct a movie again, and this his last film, So Evil, My Sister (1974). Also known as Psycho Sisters, starring Susan Strasberg and Faith Domergue, the film "never received a general theatrical release."

== Television career ==
A freelance director since the late 1940s, LeBorg was at liberty to accept directorial assignments from the emerging television industry. He proved well-suited to perform the tasks required to shoot half-hour or hour programs. In most cases, the actors in a series had already established their TV character roles, and required minimal direction. A one-hour program required little more than seven days to shoot. A single rehearsal was sufficient before the actual take.

Throughout the 1950s and 1960s, LeBorg directed close to one hundred program episodes, including those for DuPont Theatre, Death Valley Days, Sugarfoot, Bourbon Street Beat, and 77 Sunset Strip (See Filmography complete list).LeBorg was particularly fond of directing Warner Bros. productions, such as Maverick starring James Garner and Bronco, starring Ty Hardin.

== Personal life ==
In his 1988 interviews with filmmaker and biographer Wheeler Winston Dixon at University of Nebraska–Lincoln Film Studies Program seminar, LeBorg divulged little about his marriage in the published transcriptions. He acknowledged that he was divorced, and that the union had produced one child, "my daughter, Regina." LeBorg remarked:

I was always in need of money, and that's the trouble, you see? I had a divorce, and all my money went there, and I wanted to bring up my daughter nicely in college, so I spent a lot of money. And I lived well.

== Final years ==
With advancing age, LeBorg retired from television, but he continued to write scripts and conceive projects. He completed a dozen screenplays in collaboration with a number of other writers while working from his home. These range from 60- to over 150-page treatments, adaptations of operas, and finished screenplays, often based on famous historical figures. None of these projects were realized.

In his elegiac remarks on LeBorg, biographer Wheeler Winston Dixon characterizes LeBorg as "a cultured man, who brought his own sensitivity to every project he worked on, a dedicated craftsman who created much, and would have done a great deal more had the opportunity not been denied him." Dixon adds: "Although he ostensibly retired in 1974, he remained anxious to direct until the day he died."

On 25 March 1989, aged 86, LeBorg, while driving to an awards ceremony in his honor, sponsored by the Academy of Family Films and Family Television, suffered a massive and fatal heart attack.

== Directorial credits ==
=== Feature films ===
Note: Year of film release provided in parentheses (co-writing credits listed where applicable).

- She's for Me (1943)
- Calling Dr. Death (1943)
- Heavenly Music (1943 - writer)
- Adventure in Music (1944)
- Dead Man's Eyes (1944)
- San Diego, I Love You (1944)
- Destiny (1944)
- Jungle Woman (1944)
- The Mummy's Ghost (1944)
- Weird Woman (1944)
- Honeymoon Ahead (1945)
- Joe Palooka, Champ (1946)
- Little Iodine (1946)
- Susie Steps Out (1946)
- Fall Guy (1947)
- The Adventures of Don Coyote (1947)
- Philo Vance's Secret Mission (1947)
- Joe Palooka in the Knockout (1947)
- Joe Palooka in Fighting Mad (1948)
- Port Said (1948)
- Joe Palooka in Winner Take All (1948)
- Trouble Makers (1948)
- Fighting Fools (1949)
- Hold That Baby! (1949)
- Joe Palooka in the Counterpunch (1949)
- Wyoming Mail (1950)
- Young Daniel Boone (1950)
- Joe Palooka in the Squared Circle (1950)
- Joe Palooka in Triple Cross(1951)
- G.I. Jane (1951)
- Models, Inc. (1952)
- The Flanagan Boy (a.k.a. Bad Blonde) (1953)
- The Great Jesse James Raid (1953)
- Sins of Jezebel (1953)
- The White Orchid (1954 - writer)
- The Black Sleep (1956)
- Voodoo Island (1957)
- War Drums (1957)
- The Dalton Girls (1957)
- The Flight that Disappeared (1961)
- Deadly Duo (1962)
- Diary of a Madman (1963)
- The Eyes of Annie Jones (1964)
- House of the Black Death (1965)
- So Evil, My Sister (1974)

=== Big band swing shorts ===
LeBorg directed twenty-three big band "swing shorts"—primarily for Universal Pictures' short subject department. The duration of the shorts created by LeBorg were 20 minutes.

- Swing Banditry (1936) featuring George Stoll and his orchestra
- No Place Like Rome (1936)
- A Girl's Best Years (1937), a "Miniature Musical Comedy" featuring John Warburton, Mary Doran and Sheila Terry
- Jingle Belles (1941)
- Music A La King (1941) featuring Henry King and his orchestra
- Once Upon a Summertime (1941) featuring Skinnay Ennis and his orchestra
- Campus Capers (1941)
- Shadows in Swing (1941)
- Skyline Serenade (1941)
- Rhumba Rhythms (1941) South American themed musical performances led by Carlos Molina and his orchestra
- Shuffle Rhythm (1942) featuring Henry Busse and his orchestra
- Rainbow Rhythms (1942) featuring Al Donahue and his orchestra
- Jivin' Jam Session (1942)
- Merry Madcaps (1942)
- Chasin' the Blues (1942), Milton Rosen orchestrator and featuring Ted Fio Rito and his Orchestra along with Candy Candido Will Cowan associate producer
- Hit Tune Jamboree (1942) featuring the Mills Brothers
- Swing's the Thing (1942)
- Serenade in Swing (1942)
- Swingtime Blues (1942)
- Tune Time (1942) featuring Jan Garber and his orchestra
- Trumpet Serenade (1942) featuring Harry James, extant and posted on YouTube
- Hit Tune Serenade (1943)
- Russian Revels (1943) starring Gertrude Niesen

=== Operatic sequences ===
LeBorg acted as stage director for the opera sequences in the following features.

Film	Year	Studio	Film director
One Night of Love	1934	Columbia	Victor Schertzinger
Love Me Forever	1935	Columbia	Victor Schertzinger
Here's to Romance	1935	Fox	Alfred E. Green
The Melody Lingers On	1935	Reliance	David Burton
Give Us This Night	1936	Paramount	Alexander Hall

=== Television ===
LeBorg directed approximately 100 shows for television. Production companies are listed after each program or series for which LeBorg directed episodes.

==== One-hour programs ====
- Maverick (Warner Bros.)
- 77 Sunset Strip (Warner Bros.)
- Bourbon Street Beat (Warner Bros.)
- Bronco (Warner Bros.)
- The Alaskans (Warner Bros.)
- Sugarfoot (Warner Bros.)
- The Islanders (Metro-Goldwyn-Mayer)
- Wire Service (Desilu)

==== Half-hour programs ====
- DuPont Theatre (Desilu)
- Tightrope! (Screen Gems)
- Stage 7 (Four Star)
- The Star and the Story (Four Star)
- The Deputy (Revue)
- Navy Log (Gallu)
- Schlitz Playhouse of Stars (Meridian Productions/Revue)
- The Court of Last Resort (Walden Productions)
- Death Valley Days (Robert A. McGown)
- Miami Undercover (Schenck-Koch Productions)
- The Case of the Dangerous Robin (Ziv-UA)
- Anthology (Sovereign)
- Medal of Honor (W. R. Frank)
- Comedy Series (Hank McCune)
