= The Great Plane Robbery =

The Great Plane Robbery may refer to:

- The Great Plane Robbery (1940 film), a film directed by Lewis D. Collins
- The Great Plane Robbery (1950 film), a film directed by Edward L. Cahn
