= Henry Blankfort =

American screenwriter

- Born: December 25, 1902; New York City, New York
- Died: June 16, 1993 (aged 90); Los Angeles, California
- Occupation: Screenwriter

Henry Blankfort (December 25, 1902 – June 16, 1993) was an American screenwriter. He wrote the films Youth on Parole, Klondike Fury, Rubber Racketeers, Tales of Manhattan, Harrigan's Kid, I Escaped from the Gestapo, She's for Me, Reckless Age, The Singing Sheriff, Night Club Girl, Swing Out, Sister, I'll Tell the World, Easy to Look At, The Crimson Canary, Open Secret, Joe Palooka in the Counterpunch, Joe Palooka Meets Humphrey, Joe Palooka in the Squared Circle, G.I. Jane, The Highwayman and Joe Palooka in Triple Cross.

Due to his political beliefs, Blankfort was blacklisted during the McCarthy era, and his film career ended when he refused to testify before the House Committee on Un-American Activities in 1951. He wrote his last three films (G.I. Jane, The Highwayman and Joe Palooka in Triple Cross) under the pseudonym Jan Jeffries. After leaving Hollywood, he started a second career in public relations.

Henry Blankfort died of cardiac arrest on June 16, 1993, in Los Angeles, California at age 90.
