= Hold That Baby! =

1949 film by Reginald LeBorg

- Directed by: Reginald LeBorg
- Written by: Gerald Schnitzer; Charles Marion
- Produced by: Jan Grippo
- Starring: Leo Gorcey; Huntz Hall; Gabriel Dell; David Gorcey; William Benedict
- Cinematography: William A. Sickner
- Edited by: William Austin
- Music by: Edward J. Kay
- Distributed by: Monogram Pictures
- Release date: June 26, 1949
- Running time: 64 minutes
- Country: United States
- Language: English

Hold That Baby! is a 1949 American comedy film directed by Reginald LeBorg and starring The Bowery Boys. The film was released on June 26, 1949, by Monogram Pictures and is the fourteenth film in the series.

== Plot ==
The boys are running a laundromat in the back room of Louie's Sweet Shop. A woman, Laura Andrews, comes in and leaves her baby in one of the laundry baskets and the boys find him. They discover that he is the heir to a fortune, and that his mother hid him so that her aunts couldn't steal the inheritance. After discovering the baby is missing, the aunts have Laura committed to a sanatorium for supposedly being mentally ill.

Meanwhile, a bunch of gangsters get wind of the situation and make a deal with the aunts to keep the baby away from the reading of the will. Sach and Slip sneak into the sanatorium under the guise of committing Sach where they help Laura escape. They make it to the reading of the will just in time and Laura and her son gain the inheritance and the aunts are arrested, along with the gangsters.

During the film Sach has a One Touch of Venus type longing for a store mannequin he calls Cynthia.

== Cast ==
=== The Bowery Boys ===
- Leo Gorcey as Terrance Aloysius 'Slip' Mahoney
- Huntz Hall as Horace Debussy 'Sach' Jones
- Billy Benedict as Whitey
- Bennie Bartlett as Butch
- David Gorcey as Chuck

=== Remaining cast ===
- Gabriel Dell as Gabe Moreno
- Frankie Darro as Bananas
- Anabel Shaw as Laura Andrews
- John Kellogg as Cherry Nose Gray
- Edward Gargan as Officer Burton
- Ida Moore as Faith Andrews
- Florence Auer as Hope Andrews
- Bernard Gorcey as Louie Dumbrowski
- Pierre Watkin as John Winston
- Torben Meyer as Dr. Hans Heinrich
- Fred Nurney as Dr. Hugo Schiller
- Frances Irvin as Cynthia
- Emmett Vogan as Dr. Foster
- Meyer Grace as Joe, the Crooner
- Max Marx as Gypsy Moran
- Cay Forrester as Nurse
- Buddy Gorman as Paper Boy

== Home media ==
Warner Archives released the film on made-to-order DVD in the United States as part of "The Bowery Boys, Volume One" on November 23, 2012.

Preceded by Fighting Fools; 1949	'The Bowery Boys' movies 1946-1958	Succeeded by Angels in Disguise; 1949
