= Song and Dance Man (film) =

1936 film by Allan Dwan

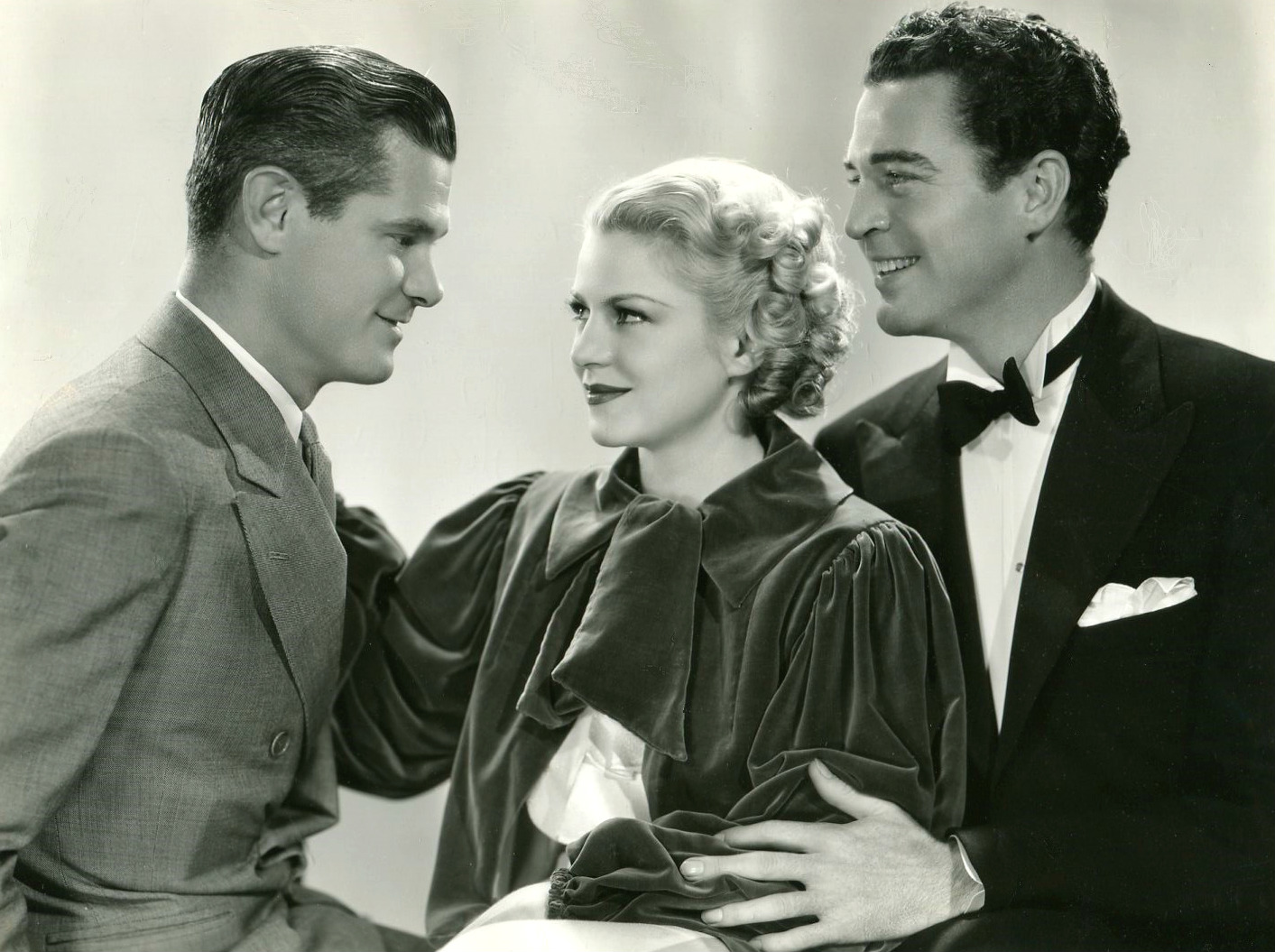
- Still with Paul Kelly, Claire Trevor, and Michael Whalen
- Directed by: Allan Dwan
- Screenplay by: Maude Fulton; George M. Cohan (play)
- Produced by: Sol M. Wurtzel
- Starring: Claire Trevor; Paul Kelly; Michael Whalen; Ruth Donnelly; James Burke; Helen Troy
- Cinematography: Barney McGill
- Edited by: Alfred DeGaetano
- Music by: R.H. Bassett; Gene Rose
- Production company: 20th Century Fox
- Distributed by: 20th Century Fox
- Release date: March 11, 1936
- Running time: 72 minutes
- Country: United States
- Language: English

Song and Dance Man is a 1936 American drama film directed by Allan Dwan, written by Maude Fulton, adapted from the play by George M. Cohan. It stars Claire Trevor, Paul Kelly, Michael Whalen, Ruth Donnelly, James Burke and Helen Troy. It was released on March 11, 1936, by 20th Century Fox.

== Cast ==
- Claire Trevor as Julia Carroll
- Paul Kelly as Hap Farrell
- Michael Whalen as Alan Davis
- Ruth Donnelly as Patsy O'Madigan
- James Burke as Lt. Mike Boyle
- Helen Troy as Sally
- Lester Matthews as C. B. Nelson
- Ralf Harolde as Crosby
- Gloria Roy as Dolores
- Margaret Dumont as Mrs. Whitney
- Billy Bevan as Curtis
- Irene Franklin as Goldie McGuffy
- Jean Porter as Girl

== See also ==
- The Song and Dance Man (1926)
