= Young Daniel Boone =

1950 film by Reginald LeBorg

- Theatrical release poster
- Directed by: Reginald LeBorg
- Screenplay by: Clint Johnston; Reginald LeBorg
- Story by: Clint Johnston
- Produced by: James S. Burkett
- Starring: David Bruce; Kristine Miller; Damian O'Flynn; Don Beddoe; Mary Treen; John Mylong
- Cinematography: Gilbert Warrenton
- Edited by: Charles Craft; Otho Lovering
- Production company: Monogram Pictures
- Distributed by: Monogram Pictures
- Release date: March 5, 1950
- Running time: 71 minutes
- Country: United States
- Language: English

Young Daniel Boone is a 1950 American Cinecolor Western film directed by Reginald LeBorg and written by Clint Johnston and Reginald LeBorg. The film stars David Bruce, Kristine Miller, Damian O'Flynn, Don Beddoe, Mary Treen and John Mylong. It was released on March 5, 1950 by Monogram Pictures.

== Plot ==
In the aftermath of an Indian massacre of white settlers in the 18th century, frontiersman and guide Daniel Boone is sent by British general Braddock to search for survivors. Among them is Charlie Bryan, who reports that his two daughters were carried away by the Indians. Boone rescues the young women, Rebecca and Helen. A French captain, Fraser, representing French colonial interests, captures Boone and his party. An attack by Indians in alliance with British forces leads to a fight in which Boone kills Captain Fraser. Boone and Rebecca intend to marry and settle in Kentucky.

== Cast ==
- David Bruce as Daniel Boone
- Kristine Miller as Rebecca Bryan
- Damian O'Flynn as Capt. Fraser
- Don Beddoe as Charlie Bryan
- Mary Treen as Helen Bryan
- John Mylong as Col. von Arnheim
- William Roy Little Hawk
- Stanley Logan as Col. Benson
- Herbert Naish as Pvt. Haslet
- Nipo T. Strongheart as Walking Eagle
- Dick Foote as Lt. Perkins
- Stephen S. Harrison as Sentry
