= Jean Porter =

American actress (1922–2018)

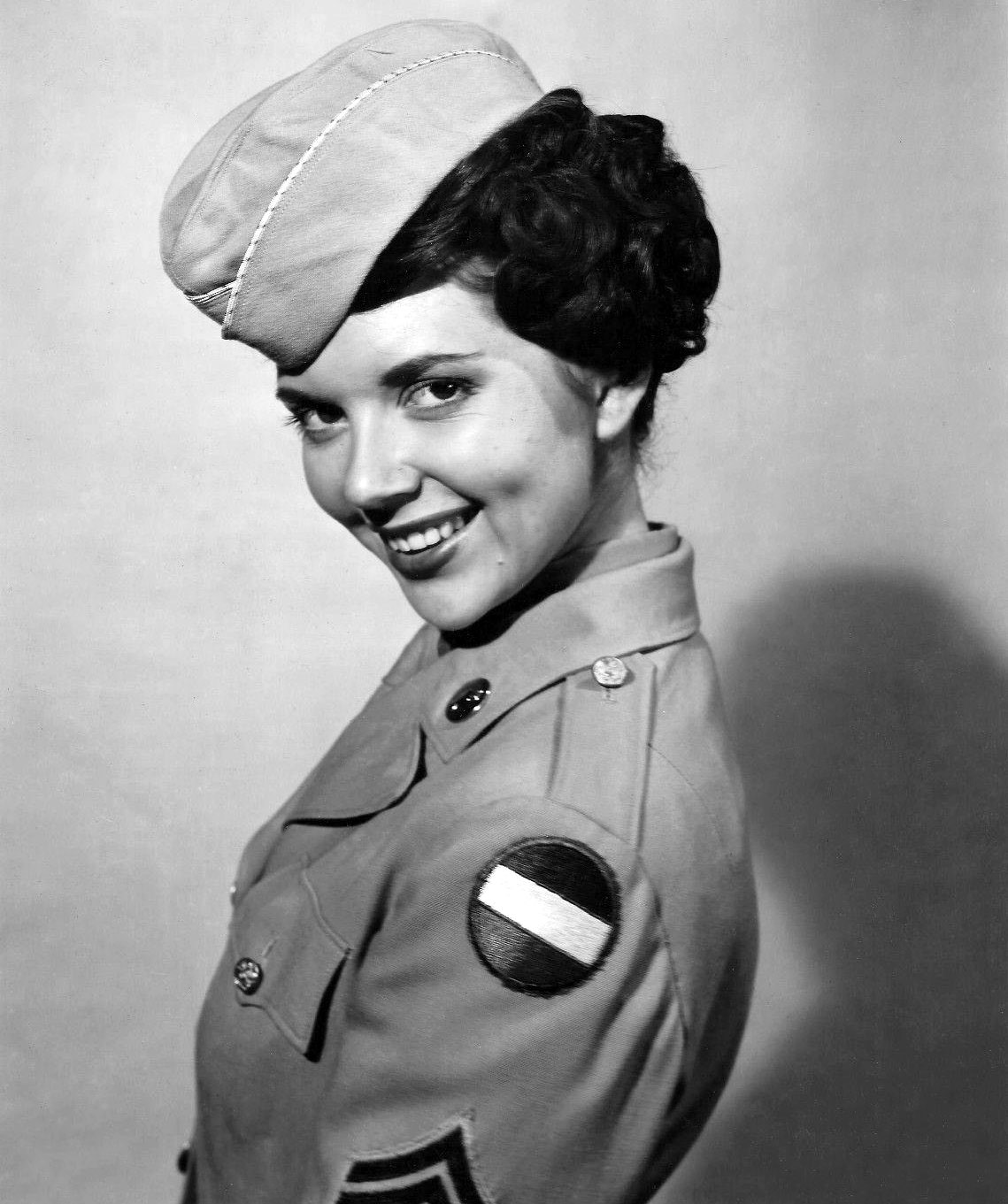
- Porter in a publicity still for G.I. Jane (1951)
- Born: Bennie Jean Porter; December 8, 1922; Cisco, Texas, U.S
- Died: January 13, 2018 (aged 95); Los Angeles, California, U.S
- Occupation: Actress
- Years active: 1936–1961
- Spouse: Edward Dmytryk (m. 1948; died 1999)
- Children: Victoria Dmytryk Rebecca Dmytryk stepson Michael Dmytryk

Bennie Jean Porter (December 8, 1922 – January 13, 2018), known professionally as Jean Porter, was an American film and television actress, noted for her roles in The Youngest Profession (1943), Bathing Beauty (1944), Abbott and Costello in Hollywood (1945), Till the End of Time (1946), Cry Danger (1951), and The Left Hand of God (1955).

Porter was married to Edward Dmytryk, who was one of the Hollywood Ten, the most prominent blacklisted group in the film industry during the McCarthy era.

== Early life ==
Porter was born in Cisco, Texas, to a Texas and Pacific Railway worker and a music teacher. When she was one year old, she was called the "Most Beautiful Baby" in Eastland County. At 10 years old she hosted a half-hour radio show on Saturday mornings on the WRR station in Dallas, Texas. She also spent a summer working for Ted Lewis's Vaudeville Band.

== Career ==
At the age of 12 in 1935, Porter arrived in Hollywood and took dancing lessons at the Fanchon and Marco dance school. Porter acted in Dwan's 1936 musical, Song and Dance Man, but did not appear in the credits.

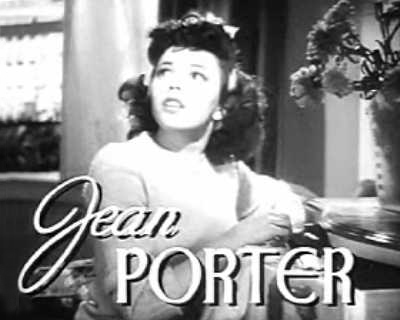
Porter in the trailer for Twice Blessed (1945)

Beginning with small roles in such movies as The Adventures of Tom Sawyer (1938) and The Under-Pup (1939), she was signed by producer Hal Roach, who featured her in comedies. She also appeared in Roach's 1940 adventure One Million B.C.. Never Give a Sucker an Even Break (1941) and Hellzapoppin‘ (1941) followed.

Porter was signed by Metro-Goldwyn-Mayer in 1941 on loan from Roach. Though never a big star, Jean Porter was active as a wholesome, mainly comedic ingenue in B pictures throughout the 1940s, appearing in almost 30 features alongside MGM stars such as Esther Williams, Mickey Rooney, Margaret Dumont, and the comedy duo Abbott and Costello. She recalled in 1947: "I was under contract to M-G-M, and they loaned me to Columbia. Columbia wanted me to do three more musicals. M-G-M was making cuts. They were even selling parts of the backlot, and they were letting some people go, just like that. They gave me a choice: I could stay on at the same salary, otherwise I was free to go... There was no telling what the studio was going to do, so I left M-G-M and went to Columbia."

== Personal life ==
Two years after writer-director Edward Dmytryk directed Porter as a replacement for Shirley Temple in Till the End of Time, she married Dmytryk on May 12, 1948, in Ellicott City, Maryland. It was his second marriage, her first.

During the McCarthy-era hearings, Dmytryk was facing a jail sentence for a contempt of Congress charge, fired from RKO, and barred from working in the United States. The couple moved to England, where she gave birth to the first of their three children. After they were forced to return to the U.S. in 1950 due to his expiring passport, Dmytryk was imprisoned for six months on the contempt charge. Porter now found herself in an extremely difficult situation, as she had no career and no money to support her family. She shouldered the financial responsibility by signing with producer Robert L. Lippert and taking a nominal salary for two low-budget feature films, G.I. Jane and Kentucky Jubilee. Dick Powell came to her aid that same year by securing her a role in Cry Danger.

Porter appeared regularly on television in series such as The Red Skelton Show and The Abbott and Costello Show. She would again be directed by Dmytryk in 1955's The Left Hand of God before she retired from acting in 1961. Her final TV roles were on Sea Hunt and 77 Sunset Strip. She was the author of the unpublished book, The Cost of Living, about her life with Dmytryk. She also wrote Chicago Jazz and Then Some (a biography of Jess Stacy), and with her husband, On Screen Acting.

== Death ==
Porter's health began failing while in her eighties, and she died of natural causes in Canoga Park, California, on January 13, 2018, aged 95. She was survived by two daughters and a stepson.

== Filmography ==
| Year | Title | Role | Source |
|---|---|---|---|
| 1936 | Song and Dance Man | Girl | Uncredited |
| 1938 | The Adventures of Tom Sawyer | Pauline | Uncredited |
| 1939 | The Under-Pup | Penguin girl | Uncredited |
| 1940 | One Million B.C. | Shell person | Uncredited |
| 1941 | The Hard-Boiled Canary | Girl | Uncredited |
| 1941 | Kiss the Boys Goodbye | Girl going to audition | Uncredited |
| 1941 | Never Give a Sucker an Even Break | Passerby | Uncredited |
| 1941 | Henry Aldrich for President | Student | Uncredited |
| 1941 | Hellzapoppin' | Chorine | Uncredited |
| 1941 | Babes on Broadway | Chorus girl | Uncredited |
| 1942 | Born to Sing | Dancer | Uncredited |
| 1942 | Heart of the Rio Grande | Pudge | |
| 1942 | About Face | Sally | |
| 1942 | Home in Wyomin' | Young fan | Uncredited |
| 1942 | Fall In | Joan | |
| 1943 | Calaboose | Major Barabara | |
| 1943 | The Youngest Profession | Patricia Drew | |
| 1943 | That Nazty Nuisance | Kela | |
| 1943 | Young Ideas | Southern co-ed | Uncredited |
| 1944 | Andy Hardy's Blonde Trouble | Katy Anderson | |
| 1944 | Bathing Beauty | Jean Allenwood | |
| 1944 | San Fernando Valley | Betty Lou Kenyon | |
| 1945 | Thrill of a Romance | Ga-ga bride | Uncredited |
| 1945 | Twice Blessed | Kitty | |
| 1945 | Abbott and Costello in Hollywood | Ruthie | |
| 1945 | What Next, Corporal Hargrove? | Jeanne Quidoc | |
| 1946 | Easy to Wed | Frances | Uncredited |
| 1946 | Till the End of Time | Helen Ingersoll | |
| 1946 | Betty Co-Ed | Joanne Leeds | |
| 1947 | Little Miss Broadway | Judy Gibson | |
| 1947 | Sweet Genevieve | Genevieve Rogers | |
| 1947 | That Hagen Girl | Sharon Bailey | |
| 1947 | Two Blondes and a Redhead | Catherine Abbott | |
| 1951 | Cry Danger | Darlene | |
| 1951 | Kentucky Jubilee | Sally Shannon | |
| 1951 | G.I. Jane | Jan Smith | |
| 1953 | The Clown | Jean | Uncredited |
| 1954 | Racing Blood | Lucille Mitchell | |
| 1955 | The Left Hand of God | Mary Yin | |
| 1961 | Sea Hunt | Marna Gould | Season 4, Episode 31, (final appearance) |

== Bibliography ==
- Dmytryk, Edward; Dmytryk, Jean Porter (1984). On Screen Acting: An Introduction to the Art of Acting for the Screen. Routledge. ISBN 978-1138584372.
- Dmytryk, Jean Porter (2010). Chicago Jazz and Then Some: As Told by One of the Original Chicagoans, Jess Stacy. BearManor Media. ISBN 978-1593935368.
