= Tom Neal =

American actor and boxer (1914–1972)

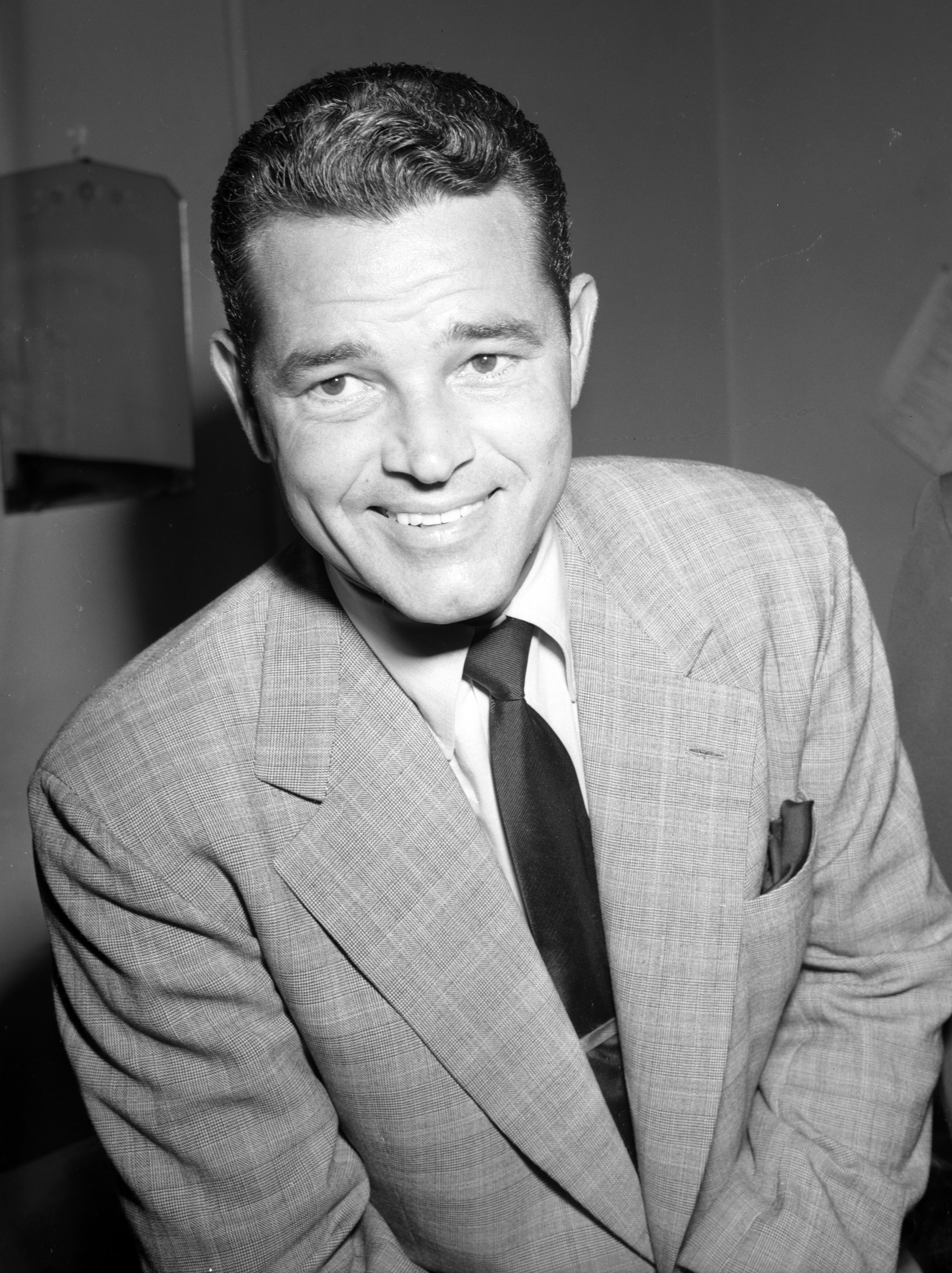
- Neal in 1951
- Born: Thomas Carroll Neal, Jr. January 28, 1914; Evanston, Illinois, U.S.
- Died: August 7, 1972 (aged 58); North Hollywood, California, U.S.
- Education: Northwestern University
- Occupation: Actor
- Years active: 1935–1959
- Spouses: Vicky Lane (m. 1948; div. 1949) Patricia Fenton (m. 1956; died 1958) Gail Bennett (m. 1960; died 1965)
- Children: 1

Play full film; runtime 01:07:59.

Thomas Carroll Neal Jr. (January 28, 1914 – August 7, 1972) was an American actor and amateur boxer. Between 1932 and 1934, he was an amateur boxer who fought in many fights. As an actor, he was best known for his starring role in the critically lauded film Detour and for having a widely publicized affair with actress Barbara Payton. In 1965, his wife was found shot dead, and he was later convicted and imprisoned for involuntary manslaughter. After release, he died in 1972 of heart failure.

== Early years ==
Born in Evanston, Illinois, Neal was one of three children born to banker Thomas, Sr. and Mayme Neal (née Martin). He had two older sisters, Mary Elizabeth and Dorothy Helen. His great uncle was John Drew, the noted thespian. Neal and his sisters were raised in a spacious ten-room home in Chicago. He attended Lake Forest Academy and Evanston Township High School before enrolling at Northwestern University where he majored in mathematics. During college, Neal played several sports and, for a time, competed in amateur boxing matches. He was also a member of the Sigma Chi fraternity and was active in the drama club.

== Career ==
Neal dropped out of Northwestern after a year, and moved back to Chicago. He appeared in various stage productions in summer stock before making his way to New York City in 1933. Neal made his Broadway debut in 1935. In 1938, he first appeared in film in Out West with the Hardys, part of the Mickey Rooney "Hardy family" movie series.

Neal appeared in many low budget B-movies in the 1940s/1950s. In 1941 he starred with Frances Gifford in the Republic Pictures 15-episode serial Jungle Girl. Perhaps his most memorable role was that of Al Roberts in the classic film noir Detour alongside Ann Savage. They went on to make five movies together.

== Personal life ==
Neal was married three times and had one child. His first marriage was to actress and singer Vicky Lane whom he married in 1948. Lane divorced Neal in 1949, citing "mental and physical cruelty".

In 1935, at the age of 21, Neal made headlines for announcing his engagement to marry 32-year-old Inez Norton, the ex-Follies girl and former girlfriend of slain gangster Arnold Rothstein. According to newspaper accounts, the engagement was broken off after the intervention of Neal's father.

In the early 1950s, Neal met actress Barbara Payton at a party. The two began dating, but Payton ended the relationship after meeting and becoming engaged to actor Franchot Tone. Despite her engagement, Payton began seeing Neal again. On September 14, 1951, Neal, Payton, and Tone made headlines after Neal got into a physical altercation with Tone over Payton in her front yard. Neal beat Tone severely while Payton reportedly watched the fight. Tone suffered severe injuries, including a smashed cheekbone, a broken nose, and a brain concussion, for which he was hospitalized. After he recovered, Tone and Payton married on September 28, 1951. Payton left Tone after 53 days and returned to Neal. Tone filed for divorce in March 1952, citing Payton for adultery. Neal and Payton announced their engagement in May 1953, but eventually ended their relationship later that year.

Shortly after their breakup, Neal married Patricia Fenton. His only child, Patrick Thomas Neal, was born in 1957. Fenton died in 1972 from cancer. In 1992, Patrick Neal (who goes by the name Tom Neal, Jr.) appeared in one film, playing the role of Al Roberts in a 1992 independent remake of Detour.

== Later years and death ==
After his much publicized fight with Franchot Tone, Neal was blacklisted in Hollywood, as was Payton. He acted sporadically but became more known for his tumultuous on-and-off relationship with Payton. Neal and Payton attempted to capitalize on the interest in their relationship by starring together in the low-budget Western The Great Jesse James Raid in 1953. The film did reasonably well but did nothing to revitalize the couple's careers. In June 1953, Neal and Payton accepted an offer to star in the touring production of The Postman Always Rings Twice. Their performances were largely panned and the tour ended in September 1953. Neal and Payton broke up for the final time in November 1953.

With his acting career over, Neal moved to Palm Springs, California, and became a gardener. He later started his own landscaping business. In 1961, Neal married receptionist Gail Bennett in Las Vegas. On April 2, 1965, police were summoned to the couple's Palm Springs home by Neal's attorney. They discovered Bennett's body on the couch, partially covered by a blanket, with a gunshot wound in the back of her head. It was later determined that Bennett had been shot with a .45 caliber gun on April 1. Neal, who was not at the home when police arrived, became an immediate suspect. He surrendered to police on April 3 and was indicted on one charge of murder on April 10.

At his trial, Neal admitted that he and Bennett were separated at the time of her death but said that her death was accidental. He testified that on April 1, he had returned to the couple's Palm Springs home from Chicago, where he had been living, to see if a reconciliation was possible. Neal said the two began fighting after he accused Bennett of sleeping with other men. He claimed that Bennett pulled out a gun and held it to his head, and the two began to struggle. During the ensuing struggle, Neal said that the gun accidentally discharged, killing Bennett. Although prosecutors sought the death penalty, a jury convicted Neal of involuntary manslaughter on November 18, 1965. On December 10, he was sentenced to one-to-fifteen years in prison, of which he served six. On December 6, 1971, he was released on parole. After his release, Neal went back to working as a landscaper and gardener.

On August 7, 1972, Neal was found dead in his bed by his son at his home in North Hollywood, California. His death was later attributed to heart failure.

== Amateur boxing record ==
Amateur boxing record
Result	Record	Opponent	Method	Date	Round	Time	Event	Location	Notes
Loss	31-3-0	(United States) J.H. Isbell	KO	March 31, 1934	2			Cambridge, Massachusetts	
Loss	31-2-0	(United States) "Modest" Bill Smith	KO	February 27, 1934	2			Cambridge, Massachusetts	
Win	31-1-0	(United States) Frankie Hagen	KO	February 24, 1934	1			Cambridge, Massachusetts	
Win	30-1-0	(United States) Harry Gardner	KO	February 21, 1934	1			Cambridge, Massachusetts	
Win	29-1-0	(United States) Sid Stoneman	KO	February 14, 1934	1			Cambridge, Massachusetts	
Win	28-1-0	(United States) Frankie Hagan	PTS	January 30, 1934	3			Cambridge, Massachusetts	
Win	27-1-0	(United States) Basil Barnett	KO	January 24, 1934	2			Cambridge, Massachusetts	
Win	26-1-0	(United States) George Krause	KO	January 16, 1934	1			Cambridge, Massachusetts	
Win	25-1-0	(United States) Bob Delmont	KO	January 7, 1934	1			Cambridge, Massachusetts	
Loss	24-1-0	(United States) Brad Simmons	KO	January 1, 1934	1			Cambridge, Massachusetts	
Win	24-0-0	(United States) Herman Zeinman	KO	1933	1			Cambridge, Massachusetts	
Win	23-0-0	(United States) William Beltran	KO	1933	1			Cambridge, Massachusetts	
Win	22-0-0	(United States) Lloyd Blake	KO	1933	1			Cambridge, Massachusetts	
Win	21-0-0	(United States) Lawrence "Larry" O'Neil	KO	1933	1			Cambridge, Massachusetts	
Win	20-0-0	(United States) Igg Rosenberg	KO	1933	1			Cambridge, Massachusetts	
Win	19-0-0	(United States) Melvin Kenyon	KO	1933	1			Cambridge, Massachusetts	
Win	18-0-0	(United States) Gary Keers	KO	1933	1			Cambridge, Massachusetts	
Win	17-0-0	(United States) Samuel Rodgway	KO	May 28, 1933	1			Cambridge, Massachusetts	
Exch	16-0-0	(United States) "Irish" Tommy Mitchell	KO	May 21, 1933	1			Cambridge, Massachusetts	
Win	15-0-0	(United States) Jim Crawford	KO	May 14, 1933	1			Cambridge, Massachusetts	
Win	14-0-0	(United States) Max Levine	KO	May 7, 1933	1			Cambridge, Massachusetts	
Win	13-0-0	(United States) Leo Hart	KO	May 1, 1933	1			Cambridge, Massachusetts	
Win	12-0-0	(United States) Paul Benjamin	PTS	1932	3			Evanston, Illinois	
Win	11-0-0	(United States) Fred Chapman	KO	1932	3			Evanston, Illinois	
Win	10-0-0	(United States) Paul Benjamin	KO	1932	3			Evanston, Illinois	
Win	9-0-0	(United States) Rod Conley	KO	1932	2			Evanston, Illinois	
Win	8-0-0	(United States) Paul Gilmore	KO	1932	1			Chicago, Illinois	
Win	7-0-0	(United States) Jack Lewis	KO	1932	3			Chicago, Illinois	
Exch	6-0-0	(United States) Eddie Mitchell	KO	1932	1			Chicago, Illinois	
Win	5-0-0	(United States) Ernest Brant	KO	1932	1			Chicago, Illinois	
Win	4-0-0	(United States) Karl Brenner-Eggers	KO	1932	1			Chicago, Illinois	
Win	3-0-0	(United States) Norman Martin	PTS	1932	3			Chicago, Illinois	
Win	2-0-0	(United States) Albert Leikman	KO	1932	1			Chicago, Illinois	
Win	1-0-0	(United States) Keith Newman	KO	1932	1			Chicago, Illinois	

== Filmography ==
Film
Year	Title	Role	Notes
1938	Out West with the Hardys	Aldrich Brown	
1939	Burn 'Em Up O'Connor	'Hank' Hogan	
1939	Four Girls in White	Dr. Phillips	
1939	Honolulu	Ambulance Intern	Uncredited
1939	Within the Law	Richard Gilder	
1939	Prophet Without Honor	Matthew Fontaine Maury	Short, Uncredited
1939	6,000 Enemies	Ransom	
1939	Stronger Than Desire	Reporter	Uncredited
1939	They All Come Out	Joe Z. Cameron	
1939	Another Thin Man	Freddie Coleman	
1939	Joe and Ethel Turp Call on the President	Johnny Crusper	
1940	The Courageous Dr. Christian	Dave Williams	
1940	Crime Does Not Pay	Frank Watson	Episode "Jack Pot" in the MGM series
1940	Sky Murder	Steve – Pilot	
1940	Flight Command	Hell Cat	Uncredited
1941	Under Age	Rocky Stone	
1941	Jungle Girl	Jack Stanton	Serial, Alternative title: Edgar Rice Burrough's Jungle Girl
1941	Top Sergeant Mulligan	Don Lewis	
1941	The Miracle Kid	Jimmy Conley	
1941	Ten Gentlemen from West Point	Cadet	Uncredited
1942	One Thrilling Night	Frankie Saxton	
1942	The Pride of the Yankees	Fraternity Boy	Uncredited
1942	Flying Tigers	Reardon	
1942	Bowery at Midnight	Frankie Mills	
1943	China Girl	Captain Haynes	Uncredited
1943	No Time for Love	Sandhog	Uncredited
1943	Air Force	Marine	Uncredited
1943	She Has What It Takes	Roger Rutledge	
1943	Good Luck, Mr. Yates	Charlie Edmonds	
1943	Behind the Rising Sun	Taro Seki	
1943	There's Something About a Soldier	Wally Williams	
1943	Klondike Kate	Jefferson Braddock	
1944	The Racket Man	Matt Benson	
1944	Two-Man Submarine	Jerry Evans	
1944	The Unwritten Code	Sgt. Terry Hunter	
1944	Thoroughbreds	Rusty Curtis	
1945	Crime, Inc.	Jim Riley	Alternative title: Crime Incorporated
1945	First Yank Into Tokyo	Major Steve Ross	
1945	Detour	Al Roberts	
1945	Club Havana	Bill Porter	
1946	Blonde Alibi	Rick Lavery	
1946	The Brute Man	Clifford Scott	Alternative title: The Brute
1946	My Dog Shep	District Attorney Herrick	
1947	The Hat Box Mystery	Russ Ashton	Short
1947	Cry Wolf	Hotel Desk Clerk	Uncredited
1947	The Case of the Baby Sitter	Russ Ashton	Short
1948	Beyond Glory	Captain Henry Jason Daniels	
1949	Bruce Gentry	Bruce Gentry	Alternative titles: Daredevil of the Skies; Bruce Gentry, Daredevil of the Skies
1949	Amazon Quest	Thomas Dekker Jr.	
1949	Apache Chief	Lieutenant Brown	
1949	Red Desert	John Williams	
1950	Radar Secret Service	Mickey Moran	
1950	The Daltons' Women	Mayor	
1950	Joe Palooka in Humphrey Takes a Chance	Gordon Rogers	
1950	I Shot Billy the Kid	Charley Bowdry	
1950	Train to Tombstone	Dr. Willoughby	
1950	The Du Pont Story	Alfred V. du Pont	
1950	Call of the Klondike	Tom Mallory	
1950	King of the Bullwhip	Benson	
1951	Fingerprints Don't Lie	Prosecuting Attorney	
1951	Navy Bound	Joe Morelli	
1951	Stop That Cab	Lefty	
1951	Danger Zone	Edgar Spadely	(2nd Episode)
1951	G.I. Jane	Timothy R. 'Tim' Rawlings	
1951	Let's Go Navy!	Joe	
1951	All That I Have	Bert Grayson	
1951	The Valparaiso Story		
1951	Venture of Faith		
1953	The Great Jesse James Raid	Arch Clements	
1958	The Last Hurrah	Tom – Mourner at Wake	Uncredited

Television
Year	Title	Role	Notes
1950	The Gene Autry Show	Breezy; Buck	2 episodes
1951	Racket Squad		Episode: "Skin Game"
1951	Boston Blackie		2 episodes
1952	The Adventures of Wild Bill Hickok	Lash Corby	Episode: "Vigilante Story"
1958	Tales of Wells Fargo	Johnny Reno	Episode: "Faster Gun"
1959	Mickey Spillane's Mike Hammer	Luke Lund	Episode: "According to Luke", (final appearance)
