= Little Miss Broadway (1947 film) =

1947 film by Arthur Dreifuss

- Directed by: Arthur Dreifuss
- Written by: Arthur Dreifuss; Victor McLeod; Betty Wright
- Produced by: Sam Katzman
- Starring: Jean Porter; John Shelton; Ruth Donnelly
- Cinematography: Ira H. Morgan
- Edited by: Richard Fantl
- Music by: Mischa Bakaleinikoff
- Production company: Sam Katzman Productions
- Distributed by: Columbia Pictures
- Release date: June 19, 1947
- Running time: 70 minutes
- Country: United States
- Language: English

Little Miss Broadway is a 1947 American musical film directed by Arthur Dreifuss and starring Jean Porter, John Shelton, and Ruth Donnelly. Dreifuss also co-wrote the screenplay.

== Plot ==
Judy Gibson's fiancé, Dick Nichols, is being blackmailed by a nightclub entertainer and her boss. Judy visits her wealthy Aunt Minerva, whom she has never seen, for assistance. Aunt Minerva and the relatives are really Minnie the Gyp and her Runyonesque confederates, four shady characters who have been quietly paying for her education out of their hand-to-mouth earnings. For appearance's sake, they take over a New York mansion belonging to an imprisoned gangster, and pose as influential members of high society. Meanwhile, Judy plays up to the nightclub boss, in an attempt to find the blackmail evidence.

== Cast ==
- Jean Porter as Judy
- John Shelton as Dick
- Ruth Donnelly as Minnie
- Edward Gargan as Uncle George
- Vince Barnett as Mack Truck
- Charles Jordan as Uncle Harry
- Douglas Wood as Richard Nichols, Sr.
- Norman Willis as Santos, nightclub owner
- Doris Colleen as Ina Mae Sullivan
- Milton Kibbee as Jeff Parks
- Kirk Alyn as Lt. O'Brien
- Joe Palma as Detective

== Production ==
The film was originally titled Broadway Baby. Columbia bought the rights to the script in November 1946 and assigned it to producer Sam Katzman.

This was the second movie Porter made for Katzman, following Betty Co-Ed. Filming started on January 20, 1947.

== Reception ==
Little Miss Broadway was well received by the trade press. Showmen's Trade Review raved, "This fast little musical has plenty of zip, and cannot miss with the average audience as supporting fare. Comedienne Ruth Donnelly steals the show, coming through with laugh after laugh when she tries to go 'society'. The musical numbers are brightly staged and convincingly executed. Little Miss Broadway should be a welcome addition to any program." "Pleasant entertainment with another excellent performance by Porter," reported Film Daily, "Ruth Donnelly is excellent in a character role." An Arizona exhibitor commented, "A good little musical comedy that will please all who come out," but cautioned, "The names in the show don't have too much box office appeal."
