= G.I. Jane (1951 film) =

1951 film by Reginald LeBorg

- Directed by: Reginald LeBorg
- Written by: Henry Blankfort (as Jan Jeffries); Murray Lerner (story)
- Produced by: Murray Lerner
- Starring: Jean Porter; Tom Neal; Iris Adrian; Jimmie Dodd; Bobby Watson
- Cinematography: Jack Greenhalgh
- Edited by: William Austin
- Music by: Walter Greene
- Production company: Murray Productions
- Distributed by: Lippert Pictures
- Release date: April 29, 1951
- Running time: 69 minutes
- Country: United States
- Language: English

G.I. Jane is a 1951 American musical comedy film directed by Reginald LeBorg and released by Lippert Pictures.

== Plot ==
Television producer Tim Rawlings is staging a musical show with the Women's Army Corps (WAC) when he is drafted into the army. Sgt. Rawlings tangles with an angry male lieutenant who transfers him to Alaska, where the commanding officer has requisitioned a platoon of WACs. Rawlings furtively modifies the travel orders so that the lieutenant is sent to Alaska and the WACs are dispatched to his own post in the American desert. The no-nonsense WAC lieutenant forbids her WACs to fraternize with the male soldiers, so the blossoming romances among the troops must be kept secret.

== Background ==
Accused communist screenwriter Henry Blankfort, who refused to testify before the House Committee on Un-American Activities in 1951, wrote G. I. Jane under the pseudonym of Jan Jeffries to conceal his true identity.

== Reception ==
Critic Edwin Schallert of the Los Angeles Times wrote that the film "offers some pleasing numbers".

Reviewer William Brogdon of Variety wrote: "This is a pleasant, unpretentious musical programmer that will fit nicely into lower-case bookings in the secondary situations. Pace is okay, the tunes well handled and there are enough mild chuckles in its comedy to see it through release intentions."

== Cast ==
- Jean Porter as Jan Smith
- Tom Neal as Tim Rawlings
- Iris Adrian as Lt. Adrian
- Jimmie Dodd as Pvt. Tennessee Jones
- Jeanne Mahoney as Hilda Beck
- Jimmy Lloyd as Lt. Bradford
- Mara Lynn as Pilsnick
- Bobby Watson as Colonel
- Michael Whalen as Major
- James Parnell as Sergeant
- Phil Arnold as Mousey
