= Wyoming Mail =

1950 film by Reginald LeBorg

- Theatrical release poster
- Directed by: Reginald LeBorg
- Screenplay by: Harry Essex; Leonard Lee
- Story by: Robert Hardy Andrews
- Produced by: Aubrey Schenck
- Starring: Stephen McNally; Alexis Smith
- Cinematography: Russell Metty
- Edited by: Edward Curtiss
- Color process: Technicolor
- Production company: Universal International Pictures
- Distributed by: Universal Pictures
- Release date: 1950
- Running time: 87 minutes
- Country: United States
- Language: English

Wyoming Mail is a 1950 American Western film directed by Reginald LeBorg and starring Stephen McNally and Alexis Smith.

== Plot ==
In 1869, when the railroad mail service is threatened by frequent bandit attacks, the authorities assign federal postal inspector and former professional boxer Steve Davis to infiltrate a gang. He poses as an escaped convict and joins the criminal operation in order to destroy it from the inside.

== Cast ==
- Stephen McNally as Steve Davis
- Alexis Smith as Mary Williams
- Howard Da Silva as Cavanaugh
- Ed Begley as Haynes
- Dan Riss as George Armstrong
- Roy Roberts as Charles De Haven
- Armando Silvestre as Indian Joe
- Whit Bissell as Sam
- James Arness as Russell
- Richard Jaeckel as Nate
- Frankie Darro as Rufe
- Felipe Turich as Pete
- Richard Egan as Beale
- Gene Evans as Shep
- Frank Fenton as Gilson
- Emerson Treacy as Ben

== Production ==
The railroad scenes were filmed on the Sierra Railroad in Tuolumne County, California. The action involving pursuit of the mail trains by mounted bandits was filmed from camera trucks by cinematographer Russell Metty. Director Reginald LeBorg was particularly pleased with one scene that he had inserted into the production:

I did something different when the cowboy [gang members] rode in. I had Stephen McNally stop in the midst of riding on the prairie and pick some flowers to bring to his sweetheart. A [Hollywood] cowboy never did that before, which is a nice touch. So the critics picked up on it. That’s what I do.

== Reception ==
In a contemporary review for The New York Times, critic A. H. Weiler wrote: "If the trappings of Technicolor, eye-filling rugged backgrounds, some name players and post-Civil War costuming were stripped from 'Wyoming Mail,' it would be bared as another horse opera. It just about misses that fate. But since the muscular melodrama ... does have these attributes, it may be set—a notch, say—above the run-of-the-range sagebrush saga."
