= James Parnell (actor) =

American actor (1923–1961)

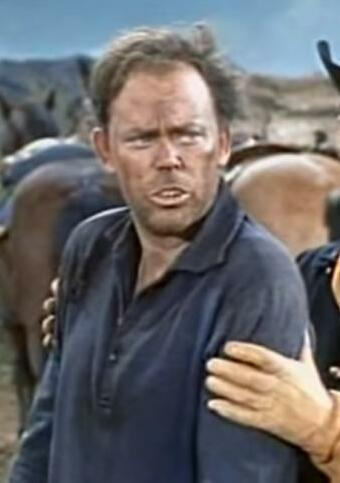
- Parnell in Bonanza, 1960
- Born: James Daniel Parnell; October 9, 1923; Saint Paul, Minnesota, U.S.
- Died: December 27, 1961 (aged 38); North Hollywood, California, U.S.
- Occupation: Actor
- Years active: 1950–1961
- Spouse: Velma Lee Parnell
- Children: 1
- Parent: Emory Parnell (father)

James Daniel Parnell (October 9, 1923 – December 27, 1961) was an American film and television actor.

== Life and career ==
Parnell was born in Saint Paul, Minnesota, the son of Effie and Emory Parnell, a vaudeville performer. He had a brother, Charles Parnell. Parnell began his acting career in 1950 with an uncredited role in the film California Passage. He then appeared in the films Apache Drums and G.I. Jane. Parnell was also a cast member of the New York production of the musical Oklahoma! for five years. Parnell appeared in over 100 films and television programs, including an appearance as Marv Tremain in the 1956 film Star in the Dust. He also performed on stage plays.

Parnell appeared in numerous films, such as, Yukon Gold (1952); War Paint (1953); The Yellow Mountain (1954); Crime Against Joe (1956); The Delicate Delinquent (1957); Hell's Five Hours (1958); The Walking Target (1960) and Gun Fight (1961). His last film credit was for the 1962 film Incident in an Alley. He also guest-starred in television programs including Bonanza, The Life and Legend of Wyatt Earp, 77 Sunset Strip, Tombstone Territory, Mr. Lucky, The Real McCoys, Leave It to Beaver, Have Gun – Will Travel and Bat Masterson.

== Death ==
Parnell died of cardiac arrest on December 27, 1961 in North Hollywood, California, at the age of 38.
