= There's Something About a Soldier (1943 film) =

1943 film directed by Alfred Edward Green

- Directed by: Alfred E. Green
- Written by: Horace McCoy; Barry Trivers
- Produced by: Samuel Bischoff
- Starring: Tom Neal; Evelyn Keyes; Bruce Bennett
- Cinematography: George Meehan; Philip Tannura
- Edited by: Richard Fantl
- Music by: John Leipold
- Production company: Columbia Pictures
- Distributed by: Columbia Pictures
- Release date: November 30, 1943
- Running time: 81 minutes
- Country: United States
- Language: English

There's Something About a Soldier is a 1943 American drama film directed by Alfred E. Green and starring Tom Neal, Evelyn Keyes and Bruce Bennett. It takes its title from a popular song of the same name.

The film's sets were designed by the art director Lionel Banks.

== Plot ==
During World War II, a group of fresh candidates arrive at an officer training school in Wilimington in North Carolina. Despite their rivalries they learn to work together during the seventeen week course.

== Main cast ==
- Tom Neal as Wally Williams
- Evelyn Keyes as Carol Harkness
- Bruce Bennett as Frank Molloy
- John Hubbard as Michael Crocker
- Jeff Donnell as Jean Burton
- Frank Sully as Alex Grybinski
- Lewis Wilson as Thomas Bolivar Jefferson
- Robert Stanford as George Edwards
- Jonathan Hale as General Sommerton
- Hugh Beaumont as Lieutenant Martin
- Shelley Winters as Norma
- Louise Beavers as Birdie
- Jeanne Bates as Phyllis

== Bibliography ==
- Wilt, David E. Hardboiled in Hollywood. Popular Press, 1991.
