= Dallas (film) =

1950 film by Stuart Heisler

- Theatrical release poster
- Directed by: Stuart Heisler
- Written by: John Twist
- Produced by: Anthony Veiller
- Starring: Gary Cooper; Ruth Roman; Steve Cochran; Barbara Payton; Raymond Massey; Leif Erickson also plays a prominent role.
- Cinematography: Ernest Haller
- Edited by: Clarence Kolster
- Music by: Max Steiner
- Production company: Warner Bros. Pictures
- Distributed by: Warner Bros. Pictures
- Release dates: December 23, 1950 (Los Angeles); January 12, 1951 (New York)
- Running time: 94 minutes
- Country: United States
- Language: English
- Budget: $1,390,000
- Box office: $4,490,000 $2.2 million (US rentals)

Dallas is a 1950 American Western Technicolor film directed by Stuart Heisler and starring Gary Cooper, Ruth Roman, Barbara Payton and Raymond Massey. The film is set in the title city during the Reconstruction Era of the United States.

== Plot ==
Blayde "Reb" Hollister is a former Confederate out to revenge himself on a group of carpetbaggers who murdered his family and destroyed their home in Georgia. With the help of his friend Wild Bill Hickok, Hollister's death is faked and he accompanies and swaps identities with federal marshal Martin Weatherby, who is using his position to impress his fiancée Tonia. Her Mexican family is being terrorized by the same gang that murdered Reb's family and terrorized Georgia. Hollister, posing as Martin, protects both men and lets them get closer to the carpetbaggers.

== Cast ==
- Gary Cooper as Blayde Hollister
- Ruth Roman as Tonia Robles
- Steve Cochran as Bryant Marlow
- Raymond Massey as Will Marlow
- Barbara Payton as Flo
- Leif Erickson as U.S. Marshal Martin Weatherby
- Antonio Moreno as Don Felipe Robles
- Jerome Cowan as Matt Coulter
- Reed Hadley as Wild Bill Hickok
- Will Wright as Judge Harper (uncredited)
- Al Ferguson as Citizen (uncredited)
- Philo McCullough as Townsman (uncredited)
- Jack Mower as Citizen (uncredited)

== Reception ==
In a contemporary review for The New York Times, critic Bosley Crowther wrote:

[T]here is something about the sadness that appears in Mr. Cooper's eyes, something about the slowness and the weariness of his walk, something about his manner that is not necessarily in the script which reminds the middle-aged observer that Mr. Cooper has been at it a long time. And there is also a lot about "Dallas" to remind one that Westerns haven't changed a great deal in the past quarter of a century, and that Mr. Cooper has fair reason to be sad. ... [T]he story that's told in 'Dallas" ... is as standard as boy-meets-girl. Except for a few clever "gimmicks" that are dropped here and there in the tale, this is one of those two-gun-man horse operas that comes right down from William S. Hart; However, faithful to his calling,. Mr. Cooper plays it manfully.

Critic John L. Scott of the Los Angeles Times wrote: "'Dallas' contains a more adult theme than is found in most film stories of the great outdoors. That's all to the good—maybe the Warner theaters can lure grownups during the engagement. ... The story gets a little complicated and some of the characters aren't developed enough but in the main 'Dallas' is an exciting piece of action entertainment."

According to Warner Bros. accounts, the film earned $2,765,000 domestically and $1,725,000 foreign.
