= Port Said (film) =

1948 film directed by Reginald LeBorg

- Directed by: Reginald LeBorg
- Written by: Brenda Weisberg; Louis Pollock
- Produced by: Wallace MacDonald
- Starring: Gloria Henry; William Bishop; Steven Geray; Edgar Barrier; Richard Hale
- Cinematography: Allen G. Siegler
- Edited by: Richard Fantl
- Music by: Mischa Bakaleinikoff
- Production company: Columbia Pictures
- Distributed by: Columbia Pictures
- Release date: April 15, 1948
- Running time: 66 minutes
- Country: United States
- Language: English

Port Said is a 1948 American thriller film directed by Reginald LeBorg and starring Gloria Henry, William Bishop and Steven Geray.

The film's sets were designed by the art director Rudolph Sternad.

== Plot ==
Travel writer Leslie Sears arrives in Cairo to meet his former wartime comrade, Greg Stewart, a theater booking agent based in Port Said. After Greg is murdered, Leslie visits his hotel and discovers Gila Lingallo searching his room. Gila later reveals that she had intended to find evidence implicating herself and her father, magician Paolo Lingallo, but that Jakoll killed Greg before she could finish. Concerned by his friend's disappearance, Leslie investigates and narrowly survives an apparent assassination attempt at a theater leased by Greg.

Gila denies involvement in the murder and claims she can establish an alibi for herself and Paolo. Paolo subsequently reveals that his niece Helena Guistano and her father Mario collaborated with the Nazis. He has followed them to Port Said, hoping Helena will be mistaken for Gila because of their resemblance. Leslie suspects the Guistanos killed Greg to prevent him from booking Paolo's magic show. Meanwhile, Mario's associates arrange the murder of Greg's friend Bunny Beacham after Bunny notices the resemblance between Gila and Helena.

During preparations for the show, Mario's men knock Leslie unconscious and substitute Helena for Gila. Having dyed her hair to resemble her cousin, Helena plans to kill Paolo during a staged sword fight. Leslie regains consciousness and rushes to the theater, while a witness to Bunny's murder confronts and stabs Jakoll. Leslie intervenes before Helena can kill Paolo, and Mario and his accomplices are arrested.

== Cast ==
- Gloria Henry as Gila Lingallo / Helena Guistano
- William Bishop as Leslie Sears
- Steven Geray as Alexis Tacca
- Edgar Barrier as The Great Lingallo
- Richard Hale as Mario Giustano
- Ian MacDonald as Jakoll
- Blanche Zohar as Thymesia
- Robin Hughes as Bunny Beacham
- Jay Novello as Taurk
- Ted Hecht as Carlo
- Lester Sharpe as Lt. Zaki
- Martin Garralaga as Hotel Porter

== Bibliography ==
- Dick, Bernard F. Columbia Pictures: Portrait of a Studio. University Press of Kentucky, 2015.
