= The Great Jesse James Raid =

1953 film by Reginald LeBorg

- Theatrical release poster
- Directed by: Reginald LeBorg
- Written by: Richard H. Landau
- Produced by: Robert L. Lippert
- Starring: Willard Parker; Barbara Payton; Tom Neal
- Cinematography: Gilbert Warrenton
- Edited by: Carl Pierson
- Music by: Bert Shefter
- Production company: Jezebel Productions
- Distributed by: Lippert Pictures
- Release date: July 17, 1953 (United States)
- Running time: 73 minutes
- Country: United States
- Language: English

The Great Jesse James Raid is a 1953 American Ansco Color Western film directed by Reginald LeBorg and starring Willard Parker, Barbara Payton, and Tom Neal. This was the only film for Tom Neal and Barbara Payton to co-star together, as their ill-famed love affair essentially derailed the movie careers of both of them.

The film marked the production debut of Robert L. Lippert's son.

== Plot ==
Famous outlaw and bank robber Jesse James is lured from his comfortable retirement in St. Joseph, Missouri, to commit one more robbery to retrieve gold from an abandoned mine in Colorado, but the affair will go wrong.

== Cast ==
- Willard Parker as Jesse James
- Barbara Payton as Kate
- Tom Neal as Arch Clements
- Wallace Ford as Elias Hobbs
- Jim Bannon as Bob Ford
- James Anderson as Johnny Dorette
- Richard H. Cutting as Sam Wells
- Barbara Woodell as Zee James
