= Cry Danger =

1951 film by Robert Parrish

- Theatrical release poster
- Directed by: Robert Parrish
- Screenplay by: William Bowers
- Story by: Jerome Cady
- Produced by: W.R. Frank; Sam Wiesenthal
- Starring: Dick Powell; Rhonda Fleming
- Cinematography: Joseph F. Biroc
- Edited by: Bernard W. Burton
- Music by: Paul Dunlap; Emil Newman
- Color process: Black and white
- Production companies: Olympic Productions Inc. Wiesenthal-Frank Productions
- Distributed by: RKO Radio Pictures
- Release date: February 22, 1951
- Running time: 79 minutes
- Country: United States
- Language: English

Cry Danger is a 1951 American film noir crime film directed by Robert Parrish and starring Dick Powell and Rhonda Fleming.

== Plot ==
Rocky Mulloy was sentenced to life in prison for a robbery and murder that he did not commit. He is released five years later when Delong, a one-legged former Marine, suddenly appears and provides a fake alibi. Delong is an opportunist who hopes that by freeing Rocky, he can claim a share of the missing $100,000 from the robbery. Rocky insists that he was not involved and resolves to determine who had framed him, hoping to free his friend Danny Morgan, still in prison for the same crime. Police lieutenant Gus Cobb meets Rocky when he arrives in Los Angeles and tells him that he will be placed under 24-hour surveillance. Rocky and Delong rent a place in a trailer park where Morgan's wife and Rocky's former girlfriend Nancy live. Delong meets Darlene, a pretty resident of the park.

Rocky knows that bookie Louis Castro is the mastermind behind the robbery and believes that Castro had framed him and sent him to prison. He demands $50,000 at gunpoint, but Castro instead gives him $500 to bet on a longshot on a fixed horse race. The next day, Rocky tries to find a witness who had testified against him at his trial. He finds Mrs. Fletcher, who tells him that her husband had died two years ago. She also tells him that after testifying at the trial, her husband inherited $5,000.

Rocky tries to collect his winnings from the horse race. But after he spends some of the money, Cobb informs him that the money is from the payroll robbery and reclaims it. Rocky realizes that Castro has framed him again, but when Cobb calls Castro to check his story, Castro blunders by claiming that he did not even know that Rocky was free again. Cobb knows it is a lie because he had tailed Rocky to Castro's office the previous night.

Two men mistake Delong and his girlfriend Darlene for Rocky and Nancy, and Delong is injured and Darlene is killed. Rocky then forces Castro to play Russian roulette, with the gun pointed at Castro's head, until Castro reveals that half of the robbery money is hidden in a safe under his desk. He also claims that Rocky's friend Morgan participated in the robbery and committed the murder and that Nancy knows the truth and has her husband's share. Rocky orders Castro to telephone Cobb to tell him that he will offer a full confession. Castro instead calls his henchmen who had killed Darlene. However, Rocky is not fooled and calls Cobb himself, and the two killers walk into a police trap.

Rocky tells Nancy that he could not find Castro. Nancy confesses that she has the money, professes her love and begs him to run away with her and the loot. Rocky pretends to agree, but when he finds Cobb waiting outside Nancy's trailer, he tells him where she has hidden the money and walks away.

== Cast ==
- Dick Powell as Rocky Mulloy
- Rhonda Fleming as Nancy Morgan
- Richard Erdman as Delong
- William Conrad as Louie Castro
- Regis Toomey as Detective Lt. Gus Cobb
- Jean Porter as Darlene LaVonne
- Jay Adler as Williams, Trailer Park Manager
- Joan Banks as Alice Fletcher
- Hy Averback as Harry, Bookie

== Production ==
The film was shot in the Bunker Hill section of Los Angeles. The Crosley Hotel, built as the Nugent, stood at 3rd and Grand. The Los Amigos bar was at 3rd and Olive. Clover Trailer Park was not in Bunker Hill, but was at 650-700 N. Hill Place in Chinatown. Also seen is China City, a Chinese-themed spinoff of Olvera Street, no longer extant, 500 feet north of Olvera Street at Alameda Street.

== Reception ==
In a contemporary review for The New York Times, critic Thomas M. Pryor wrote: "Looking for excitement and suspense? And perhaps a few laughs, too? Then accept this recommendation to a very tidy package of fictional extravagance called 'Cry Danger.' ... To anybody who is willing to go along with it, 'Cry Danger' will afford a pleasurable time."

Critic Philip K. Scheuer of the Los Angeles Times wrote: "The crisp, cynical dialogue sounds like Raymond Chandler, but it is by William Bowers (story by Jerome Cady). Powell & Co. deliver it in the approved manner—corner of the mouth, lips unmoving. Robert Parrish directs them with emphasis on characterization but—despite the fact that he was lately a cutter—holds his scenes past the prudent breaking point again and again. Even so, he is able to stretch his hard-hearted little anecdote only to an hour and 15 minutes."

Variety reviewer William Brogdon wrote: "All the ingredients for a suspenseful melodrama are contained in 'Cry Danger,' and they are used very well. Story rolls along with the proper balance between mood, action and characterization, maintains a good pace and should find the going easy in the majority of playdates."

== Legacy ==
A restored version of the film was released in 2011. The film was restored by the UCLA Film & Television Archive in cooperation with Paramount Pictures (keeper of the Republic Pictures/Melange Pictures catalog) and Warner Bros. (rightsholder via Turner Entertainment of the library of original distributor RKO Pictures), funded by the Film Noir Foundation. The new print was created from two 35-mm acetate composite master positives.

The restoration premiered at the UCLA Festival of Preservation on March 14, 2011 and was screened in other North American cities in 2011, including Vancouver.
