= Post Office Investigator =

1949 film by George Blair

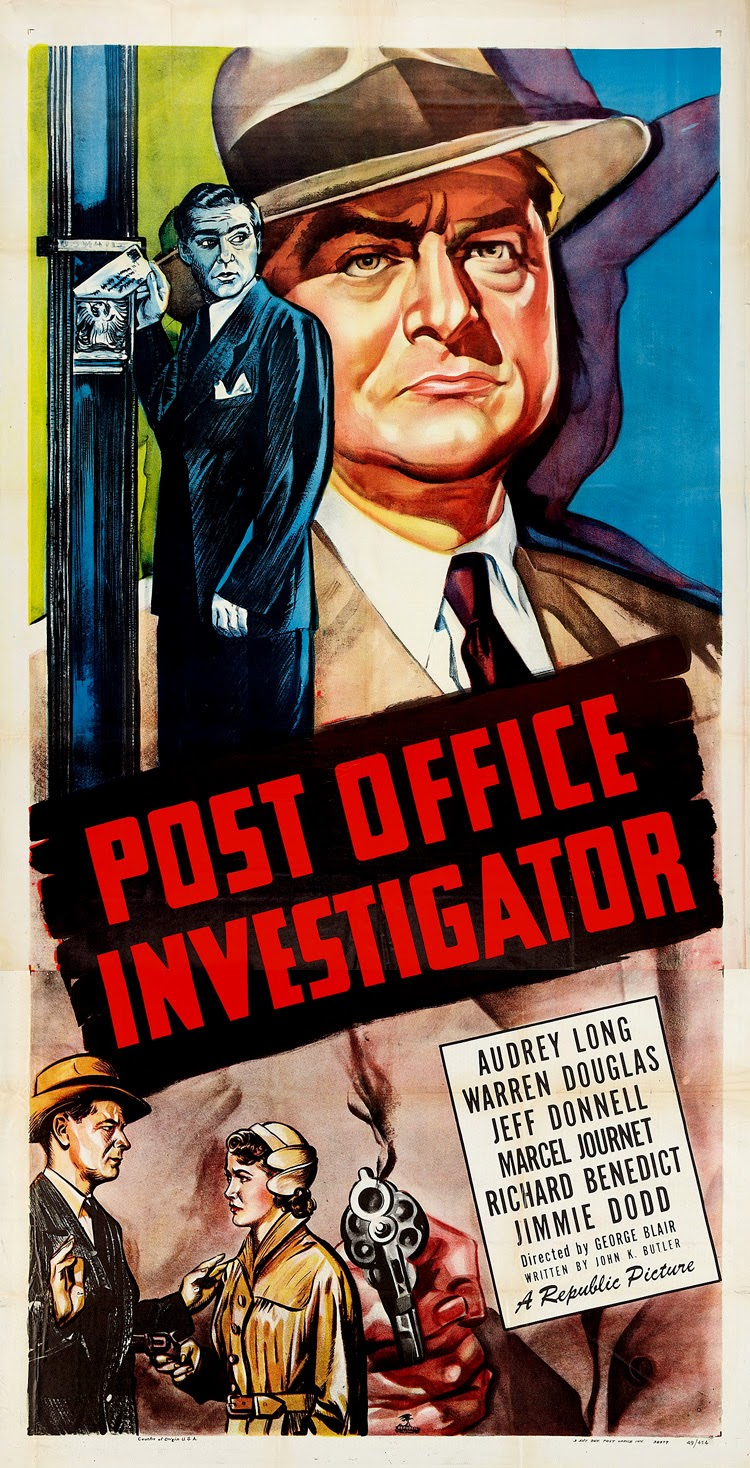
- Directed by: George Blair
- Written by: John K. Butler
- Produced by: Sidney Picker (associate producer)
- Starring: Audrey Long; Warren Douglas; Jeff Donnell; Marcel Journet; Richard Benedict; Jimmie Dodd
- Cinematography: John MacBurnie
- Edited by: Harold Minter
- Music by: Stanley Wilson
- Production company: Republic Pictures
- Distributed by: Republic Pictures
- Release date: September 1, 1949 (U.S.)
- Running time: 60 minutes
- Country: United States
- Language: English

Post Office Investigator is a 1949 black and white American crime film about the theft of postage stamps, directed by George Blair, and starring Audrey Long, Warren Douglas and Jeff Donnell. Allmovie called it a "diligent Republic programmer."

== Plot ==
A young postman becomes involved in the theft of rare stamps featuring inverted images of the Statue of Liberty. Along the way he encounters attractive criminal Clara Kelso, double-crossing gang members, and Post Office Inspectors, before finally capturing the crooks.

== Cast ==
- Audrey Long as Clara Kelso
- Warren Douglas as Bill Mannerson
- Jeff Donnell as April Shaughnessy
- Marcel Journet as George Zelger
- Richard Benedict as- Louis Reese
- Jimmie Dodd as Eddie Waltch

== Critical reception ==
- TV Guide wrote, "(Audrey) Long proves to be quite convincing as the tough lass who won't let herself be pushed around. Plot as a whole is weak, but the direction keeps up a suspenseful pace."
- Noir of the week.com called it "a very enjoyable quick paced timewaster!"
