= Trouble Makers (1948 film) =

1948 American film directed by Reginald LeBorg

- Directed by: Reginald LeBorg
- Written by: Gerald Schnitzer (story); Tim Ryan; Edmond Seward
- Produced by: Jan Grippo
- Starring: Leo Gorcey; Huntz Hall; Gabriel Dell; David Gorcey
- Cinematography: Marcel Le Picard
- Edited by: William Austin
- Music by: Edward J. Kay
- Distributed by: Monogram Pictures
- Release date: December 1948
- Running time: 69 minutes
- Country: United States
- Language: English

Trouble Makers is a 1948 American comedy film directed by Reginald LeBorg and starring The Bowery Boys. The film was released in 1948 by Monogram Pictures, although the exact release date is uncertain, although two possible released dates are mentioned in different books, December 10, 1948 and December 26, 1948. It is the twelfth film in the series.

== Plot ==
Bowery Boys gang leader Slip Mahoney and another member, Sach, run a star-gazing operation on the sidewalk. When there are no clients around, Slip and Sach use the big telescope themselves to watch the city in motion, and discover a man being strangled in a room at the El Royale Hotel, not very far from where they are standing.

The boys contact their friend within the police department, former gang member Gabe Moreno, and together they go to the hotel to investigate the matter further. When they enter the suite in question with the help of hotel manager Schidlap, there is no one there and no body to be found. The room is supposed to be inhabited by a man named "Silky" Thomas.

As the boys show Gabe how the strangulation was done, using themselves and Schmidlap as figurines, Gabe's superiors, Madison and Jones, enter the room and mistakenly believe a crime is happening in front of their eyes. After some explaining, Thomas returns to his room, and since it can't be proved that something has actually happened, everyone leaves.

Later, Slip helps Gabe find illegal gambling operations by collecting information on the street. The location of the operation is then successfully raided by the police, but as it turns out, Thomas is the one in charge of the gambling operation. Thomas receives information from one of his goons, Feathers, that Gabe probably can be bribed to back off, but when he tries to do so, Gabe threatens to arrest him.

While reading the newspaper, Slip finds out that a man named Frederick X. Prescott has been found murdered, and realizes when he sees the pictures that it is the same man he saw being strangled in the hotel. Prescott's body was found far from the hotel, and the police sees no other connection between the two events.

From Prescott's daughter, Ann, who visits the morgue at the same time as Slip and Sach, the boys find out that Prescott owned a share in the hotel, but very recently transferred the stock to Ann.

As part owner of the hotel, Ann gets Slip and Sach positions as bellboys, so that they can look further into the matter. Thomas runs the hotel bar and nightclub, and when he sees the boys he recognizes them from his room. Thomas learns that Ann is the owner of Prescott's shares.

Soon a recently released gangster, "Hatchet" Moran, comes to the hotel and wants a room, saying he is a good friend of Thomas. Moran also meets with Thomas at the hotel and wants to partner up, but Thomas rejects him, managing quite well on his own. Slip and Sach sneak into Thomas' room and finds a strange coin.

Gabe is set up during his shift, so that a crime is committed while he is talking to Slip at the hitel, unable to perform his duties as a policeman. He is temporarily suspended for this.

Moran mistakes Sach for a former gang member he used to work with, and when Sach performs a room-service to Moran, he is ordered by the gangster to drive the getaway car at a planned bank robbery.

Ann tells Slip that she recognizes the coin they found as the one her father used to wear on a chain around the wrist. Thomas reveals to Moran that Sach isn't who he thought he was, and both Slip and Sach are called to Moran's room. They are asked to hand over the coin, and Slip accuses Thomas of being a murderer.

The boys escape the room through a window out onto the fire escape ledger. They are spotted by their fellow gang members through the big telescope, and they rush to the rescue. A chase ensues, where Moran and his goons go after the boys to retrieve the coin and stop them from telling the police. Again the boys manage to escape the gangsters' clutches, and eventually knock out the gangsters.

Gabe and his colleagues arrive to the hotel, and catches Thomas as he tries to escape from the hotel. The boys then return to their star-gazing operation in the street.

== Cast ==
=== The Bowery Boys ===
- Leo Gorcey as Terrance Aloysius 'Slip' Mahoney
- Huntz Hall as Horace Debussy 'Sach' Jones
- William Benedict as Whitey
- David Gorcey as Chuck
- Bennie Bartlett as Butch

=== Remaining cast ===
- Gabriel Dell as Gabe
- Bernard Gorcey as Louie Dumbrowski
- Fritz Feld as Andre Schmidlapp
- Frankie Darro as Feathers
- Helen Parrish as Ann Prescott
- Lionel Stander as "Hatchet" Moran

== Home media ==
Warner Archives released the film on made to order DVD in the United States as part of "The Bowery Boys, Volume Four" on August 26, 2014.

| Preceded by Smugglers' Cove; 1948 | 'The Bowery Boys' movies 1946-1958 | Succeeded by Fighting Fools; 1949 |
