= Marcel Journet (actor) =

French actor

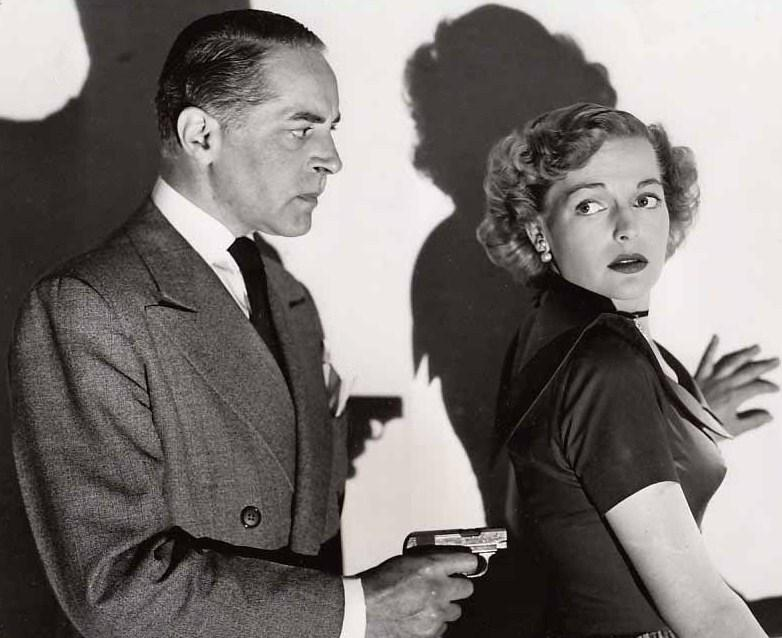
- Journet with Elyse Knox in Joe Palooka in the Counterpunch (1949)
- Born: 8 August 1895; Lyon, Rhône, France
- Died: 5 February 1973 (aged 77); Lyon, Rhône, France
- Occupation: Actor
- Years active: 1947–1972 (Film and TV)

Marcel Journet (1895–1973) was a French film and stage actor. He worked in Holywood in the late 1940s and early 1950s before returning to France. His films in America included The Foxes of Harrow and Sealed Verdict.

== Selected filmography ==
- The Foxes of Harrow (1947)
- The Crime Doctor's Gamble (1947)
- Letter from an Unknown Woman (1948)
- Sealed Verdict (1948)
- To the Ends of the Earth (1948)
- Joe Palooka in the Counterpunch (1949)
- The Great Lover (1949)
- Post Office Investigator (1949)
- The Great Plane Robbery (1950)
- The Du Pont Story (1950)
- Desperate Decision (1952)
- The Count of Monte Cristo (1954)
- Royal Affairs in Versailles (1954)
- Napoléon (1955)
- L'homme aux clés d'or (1956)
- Elevator to the Gallows (1958)
- Triple Cross (1966)

== Bibliography ==
- McKay, James. Ray Milland: The Films, 1929–1984. McFarland, 2020.
- Pitts, Michael R. Western Movies: A Guide to 5,105 Feature Films. McFarland, 2012.
