= Susie Steps Out =

1946 film by Reginald LeBorg

- Directed by: Reginald LeBorg
- Screenplay by: Elwood Ullman; Fred Freiberger
- Story by: Reginald LeBorg; Kurt Neumann
- Produced by: Ralph Cohn; Mary Pickford; Buddy Rogers
- Starring: David Bruce; Cleatus Caldwell; Nita Hunter; Howard Freeman; Grady Sutton; Margaret Dumont
- Cinematography: Robert Pittack
- Edited by: Lynn Harrison
- Music by: Hal Borne
- Production company: Comet Productions
- Distributed by: United Artists
- Release date: December 13, 1946
- Running time: 65 minutes
- Country: United States
- Language: English

Susie Steps Out is a 1946 American comedy film directed by Reginald LeBorg, written by Elwood Ullman and Fred Freiberger, and starring David Bruce, Cleatus Caldwell, Nita Hunter, Howard Freeman, Grady Sutton and Margaret Dumont. It was released on December 13, 1946 by United Artists.

== Plot ==
Jeffrey Westcott is a popular singer represented by Mr. Starr's advertising agency. He is attracted to Clara Russell, a secretary at the agency.

Clara and her 15-year-old sister Susie are concerned because their father, a cello player, is unable to work. Susie lies that she is 19 and lands a job singing in a nightclub. Jeffrey goes to the club with Starr sees that the girl is underage, though he is unaware that Clara is her sister. He takes her home, where Clara finds him and mistakenly accuses him of improper behavior.

Starr's wife believes that he is having an affair with his secretary and has Clara is fired. Susie confronts her and explains all.

== Cast ==
- David Bruce as Jeffrey Westcott
- Cleatus Caldwell as Clara Russell
- Nita Hunter as Susie Russell
- Howard Freeman as Mr. Starr
- Grady Sutton as Dixon
- Margaret Dumont as Mrs. Starr
- Percival Vivian as Papa Russell
- Joseph J. Greene as Bailey
- John Berkes as Wilkins
- Harry Barris as Ned
- Emmett Vogan as Dr. Hennings
- Syd Saylor as Biegelman
- Shelley Winters as Band Singer

== Production ==
Susie Steps Out was the first of director Reginald LeBorg's projects for Comet Pictures, produced by Charles "Buddy" Rogers and Ralph Cohn. Rogers and Cohn conceived of the film as a "B" picture, providing a second feature for double-feature screenings. LeBorg, who had proved his efficiency in delivering low-budget features on schedule and under-budget for Universal Pictures was considered the ideal choice to direct. Suzie Steps Out was shot in 15 days.

The nightclub setting was particularly appealing to LeBorg. A prolific director of "soundies," and an accomplished pianist, he "loved to be associated with any project that involved music." Susie Steps Out includes songs by Hal Borne and Eddie Cherkose.

== Retrospective appraisal ==
Characterizing the film as a "cheerful, yet unremarkable feature," film historian Wheeler W. Dixon merits LeBorg for the "deft" handling of the actors, and "bringing his usual glossy professionalism to the musical sequences."
