= Kentucky Jubilee =

1951 film

- Directed by: Ron Ormond
- Written by: Ron Ormond; Maurice Tombragel
- Produced by: June Carr
- Starring: Jerry Colonna; Jean Porter; James Ellison; Fritz Feld; Raymond Hatton; Vince Barnett; Si Jenks; Michael Whalen; Margia Dean
- Cinematography: Jack Greenhalgh
- Edited by: Hugh Winn
- Music by: Walter Greene
- Production company: Lippert Pictures
- Distributed by: Lippert Pictures
- Release date: May 18, 1951
- Running time: 72 minutes
- Country: United States
- Language: English

Kentucky Jubilee is a 1951 American musical comedy film directed by Ron Ormond for Lippert Pictures.

== Plot ==
Reporter Jeff Benson, conceited film director Rudolph Jouvet and brash master of ceremonies Jerry Harris arrive in rural Kentucky to cover a local music festival. The three men, who are from the city, experience culture shock as they try to adjust to their surroundings. They inadvertently foil a plot to steal the festival's gate receipts.

== Cast ==
- Jerry Colonna as Jerry Harris
- Jean Porter as Sally Shannon
- James Ellison as Jeff Benson
- Fritz Feld as Rudolph Jouvet
- Raymond Hatton as Ben White
- Vince Barnett as Mugsy
- Si Jenks as Constable
- Margia Dean as Millie
- Chester Clute as Mayor Horace Tilbury
- Michael Whalen as Touhy
- Archie Twitchell as Barney Malone
- Jack Reitzen as Fatso
