= The Highwayman (1951 film) =

1951 film by Lesley Selander

- Official theatrical poster
- Directed by: Lesley Selander
- Written by: Jack DeWitt (story); Duncan Renaldo (story); Henry Blankfort (screenplay, as Jan Jeffries)
- Based on: The Highwayman by Alfred Noyes
- Produced by: Hal E. Chester; Jack Dietz
- Starring: Philip Friend; Wanda Hendrix; Cecil Kellaway
- Narrated by: Brian Aherne
- Cinematography: Harry Neumann
- Edited by: Bernard W. Burton
- Music by: Herschel Burke Gilbert
- Production company: Jack Dietz Productions
- Distributed by: Allied Artists
- Release dates: November 14, 1951 (Los Angeles); November 27, 1951 (New York)
- Running time: 82 minutes
- Country: United States
- Language: English

The Highwayman is a 1951 American historical adventure film directed by Lesley Selander and starring Philip Friend, Wanda Hendrix and Cecil Kellaway. The film was shot in Cinecolor and distributed by Allied Artists, the prestige subsidiary of Monogram Pictures. It is based on the poem of the same name by Alfred Noyes.

== Plot ==
The Highwayman is an aristocrat who leads a band of criminals who steal from the wealthy to distribute to the needy. Their campaign is broadened when they discover that innocents are being kidnapped and sold into slavery in the colonies. The Highwayman is betrayed to the authorities, soldiers march to set an ambush, his lover Bess sacrifices herself to give warning and he is shot down on the highway as he tries to take revenge. The Highwayman's ghost is seen riding up to the window of the old inn, where he and the ghost of Bess happily greet each other.

== Cast ==
- Philip Friend as Jeremy
- Charles Coburn as Lord Walters
- Wanda Hendrix as Bess Forsythe
- Cecil Kellaway as Lord Herbert
- Victor Jory as Lord Douglas
- Scott Forbes as the Sergeant
- Virginia Huston as Lady Ellen Douglas
- Dan O'Herlihy as Robin
- Harry Morgan as Tim
- Albert Sharpe as Forsythe
- Lowell Gilmore as Oglethorpe
- Alan Napier as Barton
- Norma Varden as Dowager at Ball
- Robert Karnes as British soldier
- John Alderson as British Soldier

== Production ==
The film is based on a poem written by Alfred Noyes in 1906. Film rights were owned by James Burkett, who sold them to Monogram Pictures in 1946. Monogram announced that Noyes would collaborate on the script with Jack DeWitt and Duncan Renaldo and that the budget was to be one million dollars.

Noyes determined that his poem would be the basis of the film's final act and that there would be a parallel storyline set in the present day about a woman who works at the tavern and has problems with her love life. Noyes wished to preserve the tragic ending of the poem but also include a happy ending in the present day. He arrived in Hollywood in April 1947 to inspect the script.

In July 1947, the film was officially added to Monogram's production schedule, but filming was delayed. In April 1950, Monogram announced that it would likely produce the film in June with Florence Marley and Rory Calhoun as the stars.

Production of The Highwayman continued to be delayed. In January 1951, Monogram announced that Hal Chester and Bernard Burton would produce and that Charles Coburn would be the film's star, with the script written by Henry Blankfort (a communist who used the pseudonym Jan Jeffries to hide his identity). Filming was set to start on February 19 under the direction of Lesley Selander at the Motion Picture Center. Wanda Hendrix joined the cast, followed by Philip Friend shortly before rehearsals and filming started.

Noyes wrote in his autobiography that he was surprised by "the fact that in this picture, produced in Hollywood, the poem itself is used and followed with the most artistic care." Portions of the film were shot at the Corriganville Movie Ranch.

The film was released in the same year as Columbia Pictures' Dick Turpin's Ride, another film based on the poem.

== Reception ==
In a contemporary review for the New York Daily News, critic Dorothy Masters wrote: "It's a pity to waste Philip Friend on the swashbuckling trivia of 'The Highwayman,' and it's a dreadful fate for Wanda Hendrix, who stands around looking petulant while her co-star busies himself with rescuing men slated for slavery in the Colonies."

Critic Philip K. Scheuer of the Los Angeles Times wrote: "The entire concept may be summed up as competent but undistinguished. The most stirring thing about it, significantly, is the voice of the narrator at the finish. declaiming lines from the poem."
