= Barbara Payton =

American actress (1927–1967)

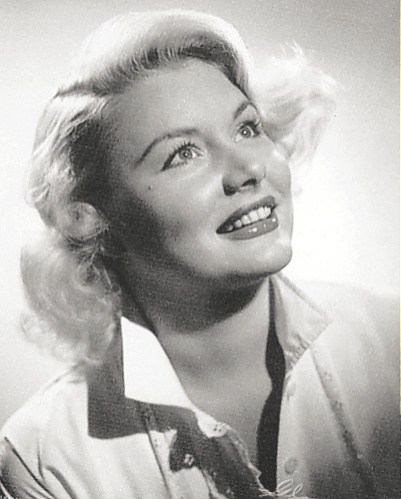
- Payton in 1953
- Born: Barbara Lee Redfield; November 16, 1927; Cloquet, Minnesota, U.S.
- Died: May 8, 1967 (aged 39); San Diego, California, U.S.
- Resting place: Cypress View Mausoleum and Crematory
- Occupation: Actress
- Years active: 1949–1963
- Spouses: William Hodge (m. 1943; annul. 1943) John Lee Payton Sr. (m. 1945; div. 1950) Franchot Tone (m. 1951; div. 1952) George Anthony Provas (m. 1957; div. 1958) Jess Rawley (m. 1962)
- Children: 1

Barbara Lee Payton (née Redfield; November 16, 1927 – May 8, 1967) was an American film actress best known for her stormy social life and battles with alcohol abuse and drug addiction. Her life has been the subject of several books, including her autobiography I Am Not Ashamed (1963), Kiss Tomorrow Goodbye: The Barbara Payton Story (2007) by John O'Dowd, L.A. Despair: A Landscape of Crimes and Bad Times (2005) by John Gilmore, and B Movie: A Play in Two Acts (2014) by Michael B. Druxman. She married five times. Payton has been dubbed "one of the all-time great 'hot messes' in Hollywood history."

== Early life ==
Born in Cloquet, Minnesota, Payton was the daughter of Erwin Lee ("Flip") and Mabel Irene (née Todahl) Redfield, the daughter of Norwegian immigrants and one of six siblings. They opened a combination ice cream store and restaurant in Little Falls, Minnesota.

In 1938, the family moved to Odessa, Texas. With financial assistance from his sister, Payton's father started his own business, a court of tourist cabins named Antlers Court, hoping for a profitable enterprise in a city like Odessa, whose population was booming because of the oil business.

By various accounts, Payton's father was a hard-working but difficult man, emotionally closed off, slow-talking but quick-tempered. His interaction with his children was minimal, and childcare responsibilities were left to his wife, who occupied herself with homemaking and managing family difficulties. Both of Payton's parents had long-standing problems with alcohol. Payton's first cousin, Richard Kuitu, remembers visits to the home of his uncle and aunt. The Redfields often started drinking at midmorning and continued long after midnight. Kuitu recalls the violent temper Lee Redfield had when fueled by alcohol, which sometimes resulted in the physical abuse of his wife, Mabel.

As early as age 11, Payton gained attention in the community for her appearance, even among middle-aged men. Her mother encouraged this type of attention due to her pride in her daughter's looks. In school, Payton excelled in history and English, tumbling, and many years of ceramics, purportedly having a talent for "creating beautiful objects from scratch."

In November 1943, the then-16-year-old eloped with high-school boyfriend William Hodge. The marriage seemingly amounted to nothing more than an act of impulsive teenage rebellion, and Payton did not fight her parents' insistence that the marriage be annulled. A few months later, she quit high school in the 11th grade. Her parents, who did not believe that formal education was needed for success in life, did not object to her leaving high school without a diploma.

In 1944, Payton met her second husband, decorated combat pilot John Payton, stationed at Midland Army Airfield. The couple were married on February 10, 1945, and moved to Los Angeles, where John Payton enrolled at University of Southern California under the G.I. Bill. Still early in their marriage, Payton, restless and feeling confined by her life as a housewife, expressed a desire to pursue a modeling or acting career.

Payton started a modeling career by hiring a photographer to take photos of her sporting fashionable outfits. This portfolio attracted the attention of Saba of California, a clothing designer, which signed her to a contract modeling a new line of junior fashions called Sue Mason Juniors.

In September 1947, the Rita La Roy Agency in Hollywood took her on and brought her work in print advertising, notably in catalogs for Studebaker cars and in clothing ads for magazines such as Charm and Junior Bazaar.

The couple had a son, John Lee (1947–2023), on March 14, 1947. Payton managed to combine the responsibilities of wife, new mother, and professional model, yet the marriage was strained and the couple separated in July 1948. Payton's drive, fueled by her high-energy personality, had become focused on promoting her career and showcasing her around the town's hot spots.

Her notoriety as a luminous, fun-loving party girl in the Hollywood club scene caught the attention of William Goetz, an executive of Universal Studios. In January 1949, he signed her at age 21 to a contract with a starting salary of $100 per week.

After her divorce from John Payton in 1950, she lost custody of their son in March 1956 after her ex-husband charged that she exposed John Lee to "profane language, immoral conduct, notoriety, unwholesome activities" and failed to provide the boy with a "moral education".

== Career ==
Payton first gained notice in the 1949 film noir Trapped co-starring Lloyd Bridges. In 1950, she made a screen test for John Huston's production of the forthcoming MGM crime drama The Asphalt Jungle, the part of the sultry mistress of a mob-connected lawyer, eventually going to Marilyn Monroe.

After being screen-tested by James Cagney and his producer brother, William, Payton starred with Cagney in the violent noir thriller Kiss Tomorrow Goodbye in 1950. William Cagney was so smitten with Payton's sensual appeal and beauty that her contract was drawn as a joint agreement between William Cagney Productions and Warner Bros. at a salary of $5,000 per week, a large sum for an actress yet to demonstrate star power at the box office.

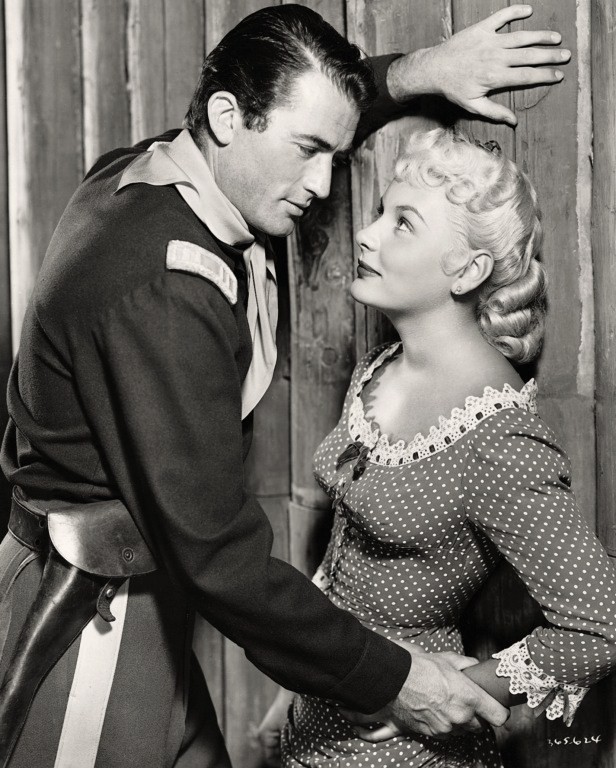
Payton and Gregory Peck in Only the Valiant (1951)

For a relative newcomer in Kiss Tomorrow Goodbye, Payton managed to hold her own among a cast of Hollywood veterans. Her portrayal of the hardened, seductive girlfriend, whom Cagney's character ultimately double crosses, was praised in newspaper reviews of the movie and her acting skills were recognized and screen charisma acknowledged.

Kiss Tomorrow Goodbye was the high point in Payton's career. Her screen appearances opposite Gary Cooper in Dallas (1950) and Gregory Peck in Only the Valiant (1951), both Westerns, were lacklustre productions that did little to highlight her skills as an actress. Payton's career decline began with the 1951 low-budget horror film Bride of the Gorilla, co-starring Raymond Burr.

== Personal life ==
In addition to her first two marriages and affairs with Howard Hughes, Bob Hope, Woody Strode, Guy Madison, George Raft, John Ireland, Steve Cochran, and Texas oilman Bob Neal, Payton was married three more times.

In 1950, Payton met actor Franchot Tone. While engaged to Tone, Payton began an affair with B-movie actor Tom Neal. She soon went back and forth publicly between Neal and Tone. On September 14, 1951, Neal, a former college boxer, physically attacked Tone at Payton's apartment, leaving Tone in an 18-hour coma with a smashed cheekbone, broken nose, and concussion. The incident garnered huge publicity, and Payton decided to honor her engagement to Tone. Payton and Tone, who was recovering from his injuries, were married on September 28, 1951, in Payton's hometown of Cloquet, Minnesota. After being married, Tone discovered that Payton had continued her relationship with Neal, and Tone was granted a divorce in May 1952.

The Payton–Neal relationship essentially ended their Hollywood film careers. They capitalized on the notorious press coverage by touring in plays such as The Postman Always Rings Twice, based on the popular 1946 film of the same name. They also starred in The Great Jesse James Raid, a B-movie Western that received a limited release to theaters in 1953. In England that year, Payton co-starred in two low-budget pictures for Hammer Films: Four Sided Triangle and The Flanagan Boy (or Bad Blonde). In May 1953, Payton announced that she and Neal were to be married that summer in Paris. The couple cancelled their engagement and broke up the following year.

In November 1955, Payton married George A. "Tony" Provas, a 23-year-old furniture-store executive in Nogales, Arizona. They divorced in August 1958.

=== Later years and death ===
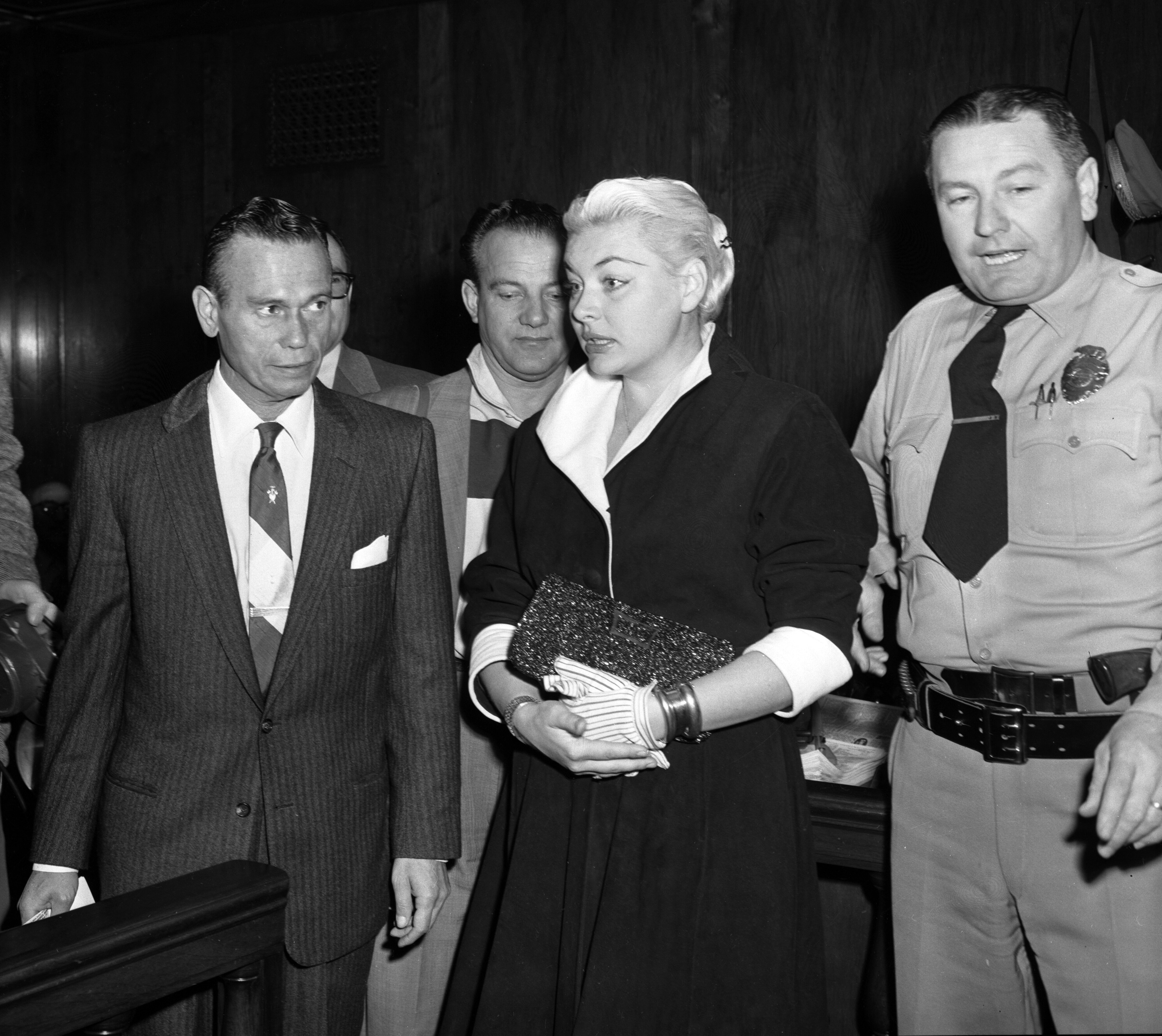
Payton in 1955, during her arraignment for check fraud

Payton's hard drinking and hard living ultimately destroyed her physically and emotionally. Celebrity bartender and self-proclaimed hustler Scotty Bowers has alleged that for a time, she was regarded as a high-class call girl, much in demand. From 1955 to 1963, her alcohol dependence and drug addiction led to multiple skirmishes with the law, which included an arrest on Sunset Boulevard for prostitution.

Writer Robert Polito recalled 34-year-old Payton in 1962 when she was a frequent visitor to Coach and Horses, a Hollywood establishment on Sunset Boulevard, where Polito's father tended bar. "Barbara Payton oozed alcohol even before she ordered a drink," Polito said. "Her eyebrows didn't match her brassy hair; her face displayed a perpetual sunburn, a map of veins by her nose...[S]he carried an old man's potbelly...[H]er gowns and dresses...[were] creased and spotted. She must have weighed 200 pounds... She does not so much inhabit a character as impersonate a starlet."

Payton won an uncredited bit part in the 1963 Western comedy film 4 for Texas, which was her last acting role.

In 1967, Payton was ill, and she sought refuge from her turbulent circumstances when she moved to San Diego to live with her parents. She had been separated from her 1962 husband Jess Rawley two years before. On May 8, she died at her parents' home of heart and liver failure at the age of 39.

== Filmography ==
Year	Title	Role	Director	Notes
1949	Silver Butte	Rita Landon	Will Cowan	
1949	Once More, My Darling	Girl Photographer	Robert Montgomery	Uncredited
1949	Trapped	Meg Dixon	Richard Fleischer	
1949	The Pecos Pistol	Kay McCormick	Will Cowan	
1950	Kiss Tomorrow Goodbye	Holiday Carleton	Gordon Douglas	
1950	Dallas	Flo	Stuart Heisler	
1951	Only the Valiant	Cathy Eversham	Gordon Douglas	
1951	Drums in the Deep South	Kathy Summers	William Cameron Menzies	
1951	Bride of the Gorilla	Mrs. Dina Van Gelder	Curt Siodmak	
1953	Four Sided Triangle	Lena/Helen	Terence Fisher	Alternative title: The Monster and the Woman
1953	Run for the Hills	Jane Johnson	Lew Landers	
1953	The Great Jesse James Raid	Kate	Reginald LeBorg	
1953	The Flanagan Boy	Lorna Vecchi	Reginald LeBorg	Alternative title: Bad Blonde
1955	Murder Is My Beat	Eden Lane	Edgar G. Ulmer	
1963	4 for Texas	Town citizen	Robert Aldrich	Uncredited
