= Trapped (1949 film) =

1949 film by Richard Fleischer

- Theatrical release poster
- Directed by: Richard Fleischer
- Written by: Earl Felton; George Zuckerman
- Produced by: Bryan Foy
- Starring: Lloyd Bridges; Barbara Payton; John Hoyt
- Narrated by: William Woodson
- Cinematography: Guy Roe
- Edited by: Alfred DeGaetano
- Music by: Sol Kaplan
- Color process: Black and white
- Production companies: Bryan Foy Productions; Contemporary Productions
- Distributed by: Eagle-Lion Films
- Release date: October 1, 1949 (United States)
- Running time: 79 minutes
- Country: United States
- Language: English

Trapped is a 1949 American film noir crime film directed by Richard Fleischer and starring Lloyd Bridges, Barbara Payton, and John Hoyt. It was written by George Zuckerman and Earl Felton.

Like many semidocumentaries, the film begins with a voice over footage of the treasury department, telling the story of what the department does. Then it quickly begins the story once a woman tries to deposit a $20 bill at the bank that turns out to be phony.

== Plot ==
The U.S. Treasury Department needs to locate the source of a high-grade counterfeit operation. A counterfeiter in prison, Tris Stewart, agrees to be released on early parole in a pretend jail break, remaining under supervision, in order that he may assist in locating the persons currently doing the forging and the plates which years ago belonged to him.

Although soon Stewart betrays and escapes from the supervising agent, the secret service, anticipating his moves, has located Stewart's girlfriend Laurie Fredericks in Los Angeles and bugged her apartment. In addition, undercover agent John Downey alias Johnny Hackett has become a regular in the restaurant where Fredericks works, pretending to be a moderately wealthy shady character romantically pursuing her.

Stewart arrives to move in with Fredericks and soon learns that his counterfeiting plates had been sold by his old partner, now a bankrupt drunk, to Jack Sylvester. Stewart visits Sylvester and asks to buy $250,000 worth of counterfeit $20 bills, which he figures would go a long way in Mexico. He needs to come up with $25,000 cash in exchange. Stewart plans to rob the restaurant where Fredericks works. The feds, informed by overhearing, want to prevent their valuable 'agent' from being lost in the caper. A police car appears, Fredericks is arrested and Hackett makes sure that she is released, while Stewart runs away. He returns to the apartment telling Fredericks he's sorry she got nabbed but angrily wants to know what her relationship is to Hackett. Stewart breaks into Hacketts apartment and after a slight scuffle offers to make him very rich if he will stake the money.

After Sylvester meeting Hackett and a "trial run" exchange involving a box of plain paper, Stewart and Hackett wait for Sylvester to arrange the real transaction. But then Hackett's cover is blown when, in the restaurant, an old acquaintance recognizes his identity and Fredericks overhears the man discussing Hackett's résumé.

Upon finding out Hackett is a "cop", Stewart attempts to kill him but fails and lands back in custody. Given this, Hackett decides to push through the sale transaction quickly. He picks up Sylvester and the two set out for Sylvester's printing press location. Sylvester notices they are being tailed, and Hackett is forced to lose his backup agents who were tailing their car. At the location, a large box of bills is handed to Hackett and he must stall, waiting for his backup to locate them. But then Fredericks arrives with Sylvester's employee and Hackett's cover is blown again.

Meanwhile, outside, a motorcycle officer identifies Hackett's car, and his call allows the agents to locate the warehouse. Inside, Sylvester shoots Fredericks, remarking that if her boyfriend Stewart co-operated with the authorities, however briefly, so might she. He then turns his gun on Hackett, who quickly flips a table towards him and makes a run for it. Police and agents swarm in, upon which Sylvester flees. A chase ensues within a nearby streetcar barn, where Sylvester meets his end by electrocution. The case is marked "closed".

== Cast ==
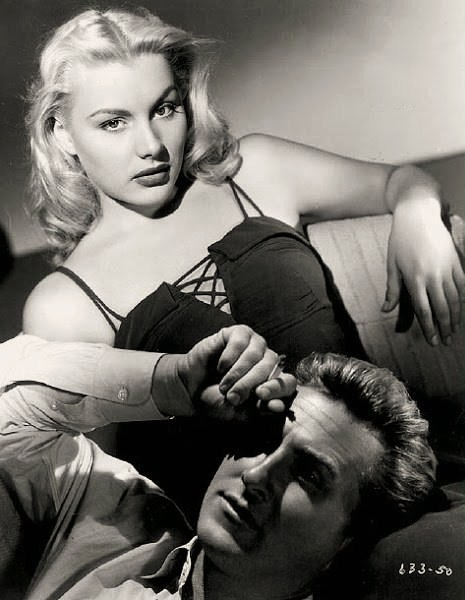
Barbara Payton and Lloyd Bridges in Trapped

- Lloyd Bridges as Tris Stewart
- Barbara Payton as Meg Dixon, alias Laurie Fredericks
- John Hoyt as Agent John Downey, alias Johnny Hackett
- James Todd as Jack Sylvester
- Russ Conway as Chief Agent Gunby
- Robert Karnes as Agent Fred Foreman
- Douglas Spencer as Sam Hooker
- Lyle Latell as Agent Curry

== Restoration ==
The film was restored by the UCLA Film & Television Archive, funded by the Film Noir Foundation, with additional funding from the Hollywood Foreign Press Association Foundation. A Blu-ray and DVD of the restored film was released in December 2019.

The restored film been shown on the Turner Classic Movies program Noir Alley, hosted by Eddie Muller, the head of the Film Noir Foundation.

== See also ==
- List of films in the public domain in the United States
