= Fighting Fools =

1949 film by Reginald LeBorg

- Directed by: Reginald LeBorg
- Written by: Gerald Schnitzer; Bert Lawrence; Edmond Seward
- Produced by: Jan Grippo
- Starring: Leo Gorcey; Huntz Hall; Gabriel Dell; David Gorcey
- Cinematography: Dave Milton
- Edited by: William Austin
- Music by: Edward J. Kay
- Distributed by: Monogram Pictures
- Release date: April 17, 1949 (U.S.)
- Running time: 69 minutes
- Country: United States
- Language: English

Fighting Fools is a 1949 comedy film starring The Bowery Boys. The film was released on April 17, 1949 by Monogram Pictures and is the thirteenth film in the series.

== Plot ==
The Bowery Boys, led by the notorious Slip Mahoney, are helping out at a boxing arena, selling programs, drinks and snacks to the audience. The most popular upcoming fight is between their own Jimmy Higgins "The Battler from the Bowery" and the reigning champion Joey Prince. The fight will be Jimmy's chance to bring home the title, but his chances are slim at best. When the match starts, Jimmy takes a serious beating in the ring. He is knocked down already in the second round, which renders him unconscious. Eventually Jimmy dies from his injuries. When two of the boys go to break the awful news to Jimmy's mother, Mrs. Higgins, she is devastated.

The boys decide to help her out, by finding another one of her boys, Johnny, who disappeared some time ago. Johnny, who is Jimmy's older brother, vanished to get away from a gang of swindlers who played him for a fool and set him up. The boys soon find Johnny in a bar together with a hussy by the name of Bunny Talbot. Johnny is completely oblivious about his younger brother's death. He quickly sobers up after getting the news, and the boys start working him into fighting condition. Together with the journalist Gabe Moreno, the boys start promoting a series of fights in benefit for the Higgins family.

When Jimmy's manager, Blinky Harris, wants in on the action, the boys tell him to take a hike, since they consider it his fault that Jimmy died. What the boys don't know, is that Harris had fixed the fight against Prince, but Jimmy didn't go along with the plan. Johnny's first fight is announced, and the training starts in a loft locality the boys get to borrow from their friend Louie who owns a candy store. The thumping and crashing from the loft make Louie's business go bad.

Johnny wins his first series of fights, and is considered a challenger to the title. A fight against Prince is set up, and the winner will then fight the title-holder Dynamite Carson. Johnny's fight against Prince starts, but when Prince goes down in the first round, he claims that he did so because the match was fixed. The result is that both boxers are suspended from further fighting. Harris is the one who has fixed the fight, and he promises the Bowery Boys that Prince will confess and clear Johnny's name. The condition is that Johnny loses the first match between him and Carson, and then gets to win the second. The boys agree to the condition, but have no intention of following the plan. Unfortunately they didn't count on Harris taking Boomer Higgins, the youngest of the Higgins brothers, as collateral. Harris assures the boys that Boomer will be let out as soon as Johnny has lost the fight.

The boys go on a hunt throughout the city to find Boomer. Sach finds Boomer and helps him escape. Boomer arrives to the ring in time for Johnny to know he is safe, and then Johnny doesn't have to lose. Harris cheats by giving Carson a metal stick to hold in his hand, and Johnny is badly beaten. Between rounds Sach manages to remove the metal stick and Johnny can get the upper hand in the fight once more. He wins the fight by knocking out Carson, and Harris is exposed as a cheater to the boxing commissioner.

== Cast ==
=== The Bowery Boys ===
- Leo Gorcey as Terrance Aloysius 'Slip' Mahoney
- Huntz Hall as Horace Debussy 'Sach' Jones
- William Benedict as Whitey
- David Gorcey as Chuck
- Bennie Bartlett as Butch

=== Remaining cast ===
- Gabriel Dell as Gabe Moreno
- Bernard Gorcey as Louie Dumbrowski
- Frankie Darro as Johnny Higgins
- Lyle Talbot as Blinky Harris
- Teddy Infuhr as Boomer Higgins
- Bill Cartledge as Joey Prince
- Dorothy Vaughan as Mrs. Higgins
- Evelynn Eaton as Bunny Talbot
- Robert Walcott as Jimmy Higgins
- Bert Conway as Dynamite Carson

== Home media ==
Warner Archives released the film on made to order DVD in the United States as part of "The Bowery Boys, Volume One" on November 23, 2012.

== See also ==
- List of boxing films

| Preceded by Trouble Makers; 1948 | 'The Bowery Boys' movies 1946-1958 | Succeeded by Hold That Baby! 1949 |
