= The Du Pont Story =

1950 film by Wilhelm Thiele

- Directed by: Wilhelm Thiele
- Written by: William S. Dutton; Francis P. Scannell; Wilhelm Thiele
- Produced by: Jack Chertok
- Starring: Eduard Franz; Marcel Journet; Sigrid Gurie
- Edited by: Jack Ruggiero
- Music by: David Chudnow; Mahlon Merrick
- Production company: Apex Film
- Distributed by: Modern Talking Picture Service
- Release date: December 16, 1950
- Running time: 88 minutes
- Country: United States
- Language: English

The Du Pont Story is a 1950 American historical drama film directed by Wilhelm Thiele and starring Eduard Franz, Marcel Journet, and Sigrid Gurie.

== Cast ==
- Eduard Franz as Éleuthère Irénée du Pont
- Marcel Journet as Col. Louis de Tousard
- Sigrid Gurie as Sophie du Pont
- Grandon Rhodes as President Thomas Jefferson
- Walter Sande as Tom Cooper
- André Charlot as Peter Bauduy
- Tom Neal as Alfred V. du Pont
- Stanley Ridges as Gen. Henry du Pont
- Edmon Ryan as Lammot du Pont - the elder
- Pierre Watkin as Col. Henry du Pont
- Lyle Talbot as Eugene du Pont
- David Bruce as A young du Pont
- Nana Bryant as Elizabeth du Pont
- John Morgan as Francis C. du Pont
- Peter Ortiz as Charles I. du Pont
- James Millican as Alfred I. du Pont
- Stuart Holmes as Dr. Alexis du Pont
- Stacy Keach Sr. as Pierre S. du Pont
- Douglas Kennedy as Coleman du Pont
- Marshall Reed as Hamilton Barksdale
- Mort Thompson as Francis I. du Pont
- Ted Jacques as Amory Askell
- Donald Woods as Irénée du Pont
- Charles Lane as Lammot du Pont
- Whit Bissell as Dr. Wallace Carothers
- Art Baker as Chemical Director
- Vincent Pelletier as Narrator

== See also ==
- The Wonderful World of Chemistry, 1964 industrial musical revue performed at the DuPont Pavilion at the 1964 New York World's Fair

== Bibliography ==
- Erik Christiansen. Channeling the Past: Politicizing History in Postwar America. University of Wisconsin Pres, 2013.
