= Selznick =

Selznick is a surname. Notable people with the surname include:

- Albie Selznick (born 1959), American film and television actor
- Brian Selznick (born 1966), American author and illustrator of children's books
- David O. Selznick (1902–1965), American film producer; produced Gone with the Wind
- Eugene Selznick (1930–2012), American volleyball player
- Irene Mayer Selznick (1907–1990), American theatrical producer; wife of David O. Selznick
- Joyce Selznick (1925–1981), American talent agent and film casting director; niece of David O. Selznick
- Lewis J. Selznick (1870–1933), American film producer; father of David O. Selznick
- Myron Selznick (1898–1944), American film producer and talent agent; brother of David O. Selznick
- Philip Selznick (1919–2010), American professor of law and society
