= David Bruce (actor) =

American actor (1914–1976)

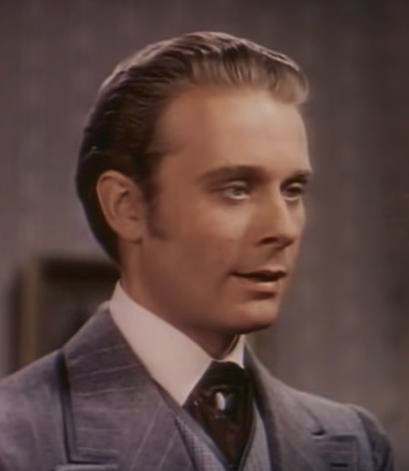
- Bruce in Salome, Where She Danced (1945)
- Born: Marden Andrew McBroom; January 6, 1916; Kankakee, Illinois, U.S.
- Died: May 3, 1976 (aged 60); Venice, California, U.S.
- Education: Northwestern University
- Occupation: Actor
- Years active: 1940–1976
- Spouse: Cynthia Sory (m. 1943; died 1962)
- Children: 2, including Amanda McBroom

David Bruce (born Marden Andrew McBroom; January 6, 1916 – May 3, 1976) was an American film actor. He was a company member of Peninsula Players Theatre in Fish Creek, Wisconsin in 1939.

== Life and career ==
Born Marden Andrew McBroom in Kankakee, Illinois (but always known as Andy to his friends), Bruce was the second of four children born to prominent Kankakee restaurateur Vernon McBroom and his wife, the former Neva Voorhees. He attended Northwestern University in 1934 intending to study law but became a drama major.

In 1940, after extensive travel for theater work, McBroom made his way to California and signed with a Hollywood agent, Henry Willson. The agent changed his name to David Bruce and he was secured to a stock contract at Warner Bros.. Bruce's first role was in the Errol Flynn movie The Sea Hawk (1940). The 6 ft 1 in (1.85 m) actor was released from his Warner's contract to join the Naval Air Force at the outset of World War II, but he was discharged due to a chronic ear infection. After appearing in the John Wayne movie Flying Tigers (1942), Universal Pictures offered him a long-term contract. Whilst there, he played the title role in the horror film The Mad Ghoul (1943). At the war's end, Universal did not renew Bruce's contract. During the 1950s, Bruce acted in several Columbia pictures, appeared on television, and wrote for television.

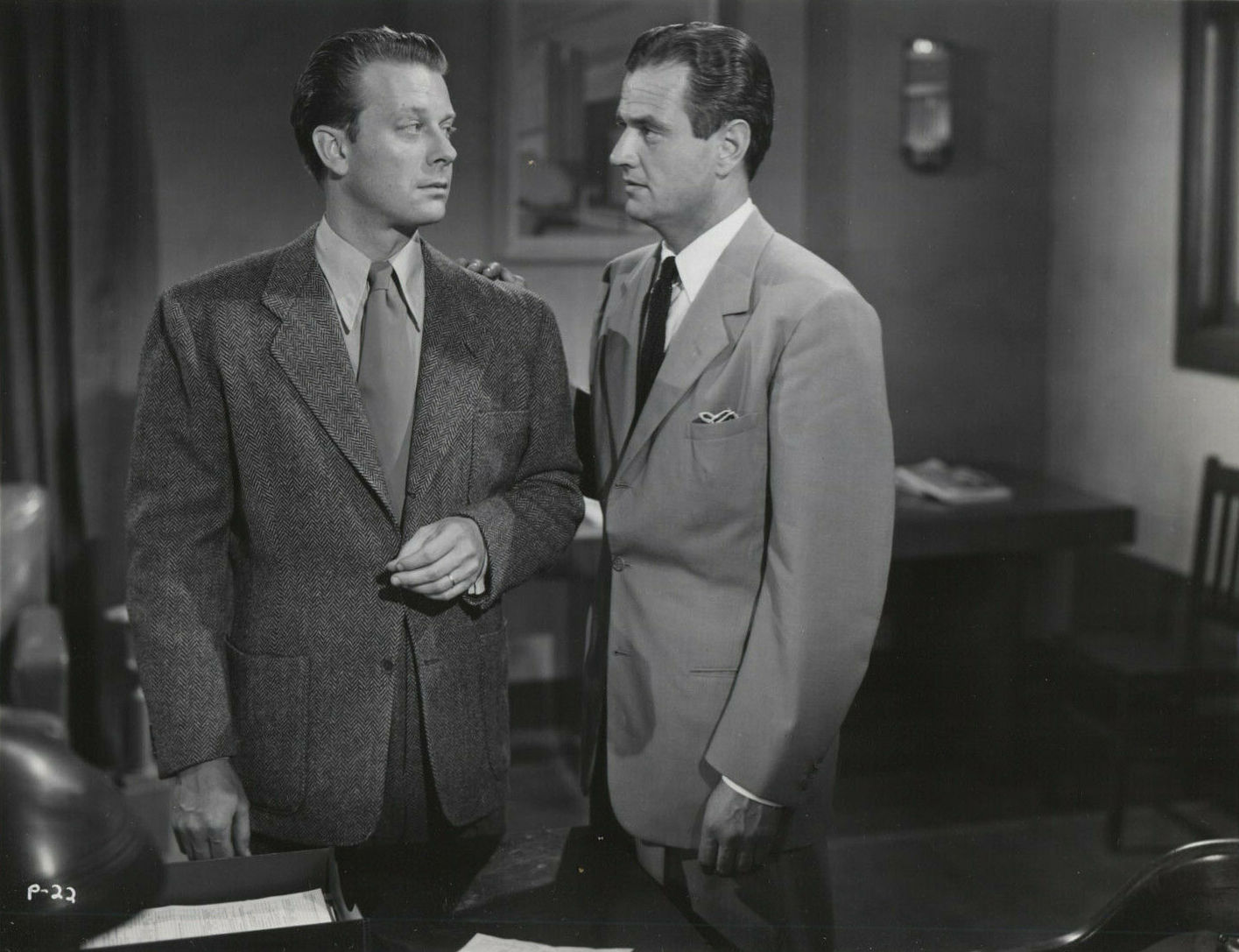
Bruce (left) plays a Protestant and Bruce Edwards his Jewish colleague in Prejudice (1949)

== Personal life ==
He met his future wife, Cynthia Sory when she directed him in a Northwestern University production of Henry IV. Bruce was the father of singer-songwriter Amanda McBroom, who wrote the song The Rose, made popular by Bette Midler. His daughter wrote a tribute to her father in a song titled "Errol Flynn." He was also the father of John Jolliffe, a psychologist in Orange County, CA.

== Death ==
Bruce withdrew from acting after 1956. His wife died after a lengthy illness in 1962. Bruce eventually returned to Kankakee to work for a relative's promotional film company. Amanda McBroom's own burgeoning Hollywood acting career paved the way for Bruce's return to acting. Bruce died from a heart attack in Venice, California at the age of 60, immediately after wrapping his first scene on the film Moving Violation. His remains were cremated by the Neptune Society, and his ashes scattered.

== Legacy ==
=== Errol Flynn song ===
Amanda McBroom says that the lyrics to her song about her father, Errol Flynn, are "absolutely" true, including that Errol Flynn was one of Bruce's best friends." Amanda McBroom confirms that excessive drinking "destroyed him for a while." The lyric that Bruce "died with his boots on" does not refer to the Errol Flynn movie (which Bruce did not appear in) but rather to the manner in which David Bruce died, on a film set as a working actor. The lyrics of the song, however, contradict that statement: "It's my daddy, the actor, 'bout to die with his boots on, he's the man standing up there next to old Errol Flynn."

== Selected filmography ==
- The Man Who Talked Too Much (1940) – Gerald Wilson
- The Sea Hawk (1940) – Martin Burke
- River's End (1940) – Balt
- Money and the Woman (1940) – Bank Depositor (uncredited)
- Knute Rockne All American (1940) – Reporter When Knute is Ill (uncredited)
- A Dispatch from Reuters (1940) – Bruce
- East of the River (1940) – Student (uncredited)
- The Letter (1940) – Minor Role (uncredited)
- Santa Fe Trail (1940) – Phil Sheridan
- Flight from Destiny (1941) – Saunders
- The Sea Wolf (1941) – Young Sailor
- Singapore Woman (1941) – David Ritchie
- Sergeant York (1941) – Bert Thomas
- The Smiling Ghost (1941) – Paul Myron
- The Body Disappears (1941) – Jimmie Barbour
- Highways by Night (1942) – Herman – Desk Clerk (uncredited)
- Flying Tigers (1942) – Lt. Barton
- How's About It (1943) – Oliver
- Honeymoon Lodge (1943) – Horace Crump a.k.a. Bob Sterling
- Corvette K-225 (1943) – Lt. Rawlins
- You're a Lucky Fellow, Mr. Smith (1943) – Harvey Jones
- The Mad Ghoul (1943) – Ted Allison
- She's for Me (1943) – Michael Reed
- Calling Dr. Death (1943) – Robert Duval
- Gung Ho! (1943) – Larry O'Ryan
- Ladies Courageous (1944) – Frank Garrison
- Moon Over Las Vegas (1944) – Richard Corbett
- South of Dixie (1944) – Danny Lee
- Christmas Holiday (1944) – Gerald Tyler
- The Mummy's Ghost (1944) – Radio Announcer (voice, uncredited)
- Allergic to Love (1944) – J. Roger Mace
- Can't Help Singing (1944) – Dr. Robert Latham
- Salome Where She Danced (1945) – Cleve
- Lady on a Train (1945) – Wayne Morgan
- That Night with You (1945) – Johnny
- Susie Steps Out (1946) – Jeffrey Westcott
- Racing Luck (1948) – Jeff Stuart
- Adventures of Don Juan (1948) – Count D'Orsini (uncredited)
- Joe Palooka in the Big Fight (1949) – Tom Conway
- The Sickle or the Cross (1949) – George Hart
- Prejudice (1949) – Joe Hanson
- Young Daniel Boone (1950) – Daniel Boone
- The Great Plane Robbery (1950) – Carter
- Timber Fury (1950) – Jim Caldwell
- Hi-Jacked (1950) – Matt
- Pygmy Island (1950) – Maj. Bolton
- Revenue Agent (1950) – Cliff Gage
- The Du Pont Story (1950) – A young du Pont
- Pier 23 (1951) – Charles Giffen
- The Great Adventures of Captain Kidd (1953) – Alan Duncan
- The Iron Glove (1954) – Austrian Sergeant at Tavern (uncredited)
- Cannibal Attack (1954) – Arnold King
- Masterson of Kansas (1954) – Clay Bennett
- Jungle Hell (1956) – Dr. Paul Morrison
- Moving Violation − Reporter 1 (final film role)
