= She's for Me =

1943 film by Reginald LeBorg

- Directed by: Reginald LeBorg
- Starring: Grace McDonald; David Bruce
- Production company: Universal
- Release date: 1943
- Running time: 60 minutes
- Country: United States
- Language: English

She's for Me is a 1943 American musical film directed by Reginald LeBorg and starring Grace McDonald and David Bruce.

== Plot ==
Two attorneys are attracted to the same client

== Cast ==
- Grace McDonald as Jan Lawton
- David Bruce as Michael Reed
- Lois Collier as Eileen Crane
- George Dolenz as Phil Norwin
- Charles Dingle as Crane
- Helen Brown as Miss Carpenter
- Douglas Wood as Milbourne
- Leon Belasco as Acton
- Mantan Moreland as Sam
- Charles Coleman as Clark
- Frank Faylen as Keys
- Charles Trowbridge as Dr. Folsom
- Ray Corrigan as Gorilla Man
- Grace Hayle as Dowager
- Carol Hughes as Maxine LaVerne

== Production ==
Director Reginald LeBorg had recently returned from making training shorts for the Office of War Information in 1943 as part of the war effort.

An experienced filmmaker of soundies, Universal Pictures engaged him as a feature film director. His first picture was She's For Me. A low-budget "program picture," Universal expected the film to be made on schedule and at or under budget, and LeBorg delivered.

LeBorg recalled that he had a dispute with his cameraman John Alton. Alton, whose approach to lighting was influenced by German expressionist cinema, tended to introduce "lots of shadows" into his compositions. LeBorg, arguing that the film was a comedy, insisted that he light up the scenes: "Don't leave them in the harsh light. I want to see their faces."

She's For Me was shot on existing sets in six days.

In recognition of LeBorg's efficient handling of the project, Universal enlisted him to create features for the Inner Sanctum series.
