= The Great Plane Robbery (1950 film) =

1950 film by Edward L. Cahn

- Directed by: Edward L. Cahn
- Screenplay by: Sam Baerwitz; Richard G. Hubler
- Story by: Clarence Greene; Russell Rouse
- Produced by: Sam Baerwitz
- Starring: Tom Conway; Margaret Hamilton; Steve Brodie; Lynne Roberts; David Bruce; Marcel Journet
- Cinematography: Jackson Rose
- Edited by: Norman A. Cerf
- Music by: Edward J. Kay
- Production company: Belsam Productions Inc.
- Distributed by: United Artists
- Release date: March 10, 1950
- Running time: 61 minutes
- Country: United States
- Language: English

The Great Plane Robbery is a 1950 American crime film directed by Edward L. Cahn and written by Sam Baerwitz and Richard G. Hubler. The film stars Tom Conway, Margaret Hamilton, Steve Brodie, Lynne Roberts, David Bruce and Marcel Journet. It was released on March 10, 1950 by United Artists.

== Cast ==
- Tom Conway as Ned Johnson
- Margaret Hamilton as Mrs. Judd
- Steve Brodie as Murray
- Lynne Roberts as Mary
- David Bruce as Carter
- Marcel Journet as Sebastian
- Gil Frye as Bill Arthur
- Ralph Dunn as Police Inspector Bruce
- Lucille Barkley as Miss Bennett
- Paul Campbell as George Harris
- Beverly Jons as Jane
- Zon Murray
- Frank Jaquet
- Grace Field
- Bruce Edwards
