= The Wild Frontier (film) =

1947 film by Philip Ford

- Theatrical release poster
- Directed by: Philip Ford
- Screenplay by: Albert DeMond
- Produced by: Gordon Kay
- Starring: Allan Lane; Jack Holt; Eddy Waller; Pierre Watkin; John James; Roy Barcroft
- Cinematography: Alfred S. Keller
- Edited by: Lester Orlebeck
- Production company: Republic Pictures
- Distributed by: Republic Pictures
- Release date: October 1, 1947
- Running time: 59 minutes
- Country: United States
- Language: English

The Wild Frontier is a 1947 American Western film directed by Philip Ford and written by Albert DeMond. The film stars Allan Lane in his first appearance as Rocky Lane, Jack Holt, Eddy Waller, Pierre Watkin, John James and Roy Barcroft. The film was released on October 1, 1947, by Republic Pictures.

== Cast ==
- Allan Lane as Rocky Lane
- Black Jack as Rocky's Horse Black Jack
- Jack Holt as Saddles Barton
- Eddy Waller as Nugget Clark
- Pierre Watkin as Marshal Frank Lane
- John James as Jimmy Lane
- Roy Barcroft as Barton's Gunman
- Tom London as Patrick MacSween
- Sam Flint as Steve Lawson
- Ted Mapes as Henchman
- Budd Buster as Sam Wheeler
- Wheaton Chambers as Doc Hardy
