= Homesteaders of Paradise Valley =

1947 film by R. G. Springsteen

- Theatrical release poster
- Directed by: R.G. Springsteen
- Screenplay by: Earle Snell
- Based on: Fred Harman's famous NEA comic by special arrangement with Stephen Slesinger
- Produced by: Sidney Picker (associate producer)
- Starring: Allan Lane; Bobby Blake; Martha Wentworth
- Cinematography: Alfred Keller
- Edited by: Charles Craft
- Music by: Mort Glickman (musical director)
- Production company: Republic Pictures
- Distributed by: Republic Pictures Corporation
- Release date: April 1, 1947
- Running time: 59 minutes
- Country: United States
- Language: English

Homesteaders of Paradise Valley is a 1947 American Western film in the Red Ryder film series directed by R. G. Springsteen and written by Earle Snell. The film stars Allan Lane as Red Ryder, Bobby Blake and Martha Wentworth. The film was released on April 1, 1947, by Republic Pictures.

== Plot ==
Red Ryder persuades a group of homesteaders to settle in Paradise Valley. As the community begins to grow, businessmen from nearby Central City propose building a dam in exchange for a half interest in the valley's land, claiming it will provide a reliable water supply. Using Red's support to gain the settlers' trust, they complete the project but later manipulate a shareholders' meeting to secure control of the dam and its water rights for themselves. Believing that Red was involved in the scheme, the homesteaders turn against him and hold him responsible for their loss.

== Cast ==
- Allan Lane as Red Ryder
- Bobby Blake as Little Beaver
- Martha Wentworth as The Duchess
- Ann Todd as Melinda Hill
- Gene Stutenroth as Bill Hume
- John James as Steve Hill
- Mauritz Hugo as Rufe Hume
- Emmett Vogan as Mr. Langley
- Milton Kibbee as Editor A. C. Blaine
- Tom London as Rancher
- Edythe Elliott as Mrs. Hume
- George Chesebro as Henchman E. J. White
- Edward Cassidy as Sheriff of Center City
