= Bandits of Dark Canyon =

1947 film by Philip Ford

- Theatrical release poster
- Directed by: Philip Ford
- Screenplay by: Robert Creighton Williams
- Produced by: Gordon Kay
- Starring: Allan Lane
- Cinematography: John MacBurnie
- Edited by: Lester Orlebeck
- Music by: Mort Glickman
- Production company: Republic Pictures
- Distributed by: Republic Pictures
- Release date: December 15, 1947
- Running time: 59 minutes
- Country: United States
- Language: English

Bandits of Dark Canyon is a 1947 American Western film directed by Philip Ford, written by Robert Creighton Williams, starring Allan Lane and released on December 15 by Republic Pictures.

== Cast ==
- Allan Lane as Rocky Lane
- Black Jack as Black Jack, Lane's horse
- Bob Steele as Ed Archer
- Eddy Waller as Nugget
- Roy Barcroft as Jeff Conley
- John Hamilton as Ben Shaw
- Linda Leighton as Joan Shaw
- Gregory Marshall as Billy Archer
- Francis Ford as Horse Trader
- Eddie Acuff as Stage Passenger Faraday
- LeRoy Mason as Archer's Guard
- Norman Willis as Sheriff
