= Powder River Rustlers =

1949 film by Philip Ford

- Theatrical release poster
- Directed by: Philip Ford
- Screenplay by: Richard Wormser
- Produced by: Gordon Kay
- Starring: Allan Lane; Eddy Waller; Gerry Ganzer; Roy Barcroft; Francis McDonald; Cliff Clark
- Cinematography: John MacBurnie
- Edited by: Robert M. Leeds
- Music by: Stanley Wilson
- Production company: Republic Pictures
- Distributed by: Republic Pictures
- Release date: November 25, 1949
- Running time: 60 minutes
- Country: United States
- Language: English

Powder River Rustlers is a 1949 American Western film directed by Philip Ford and written by Richard Wormser. The film stars Allan Lane, Eddy Waller, Gerry Ganzer, Roy Barcroft, Francis McDonald and Cliff Clark. The film was November 25, 1949, by Republic Pictures.

== Cast ==
- Allan Lane as Rocky Lane
- Black Jack as Rocky's Horse
- Eddy Waller as Nugget Clark
- Gerry Ganzer as Louise Manning
- Roy Barcroft as Henchman Bull Macons
- Francis McDonald as Shears Williams
- Cliff Clark as Lucius Statton
- Douglas Evans as Devereaux
- Bruce Edwards as Bob Manning
- Clarence Straight as Telegraph Operator
- Ted Jacques as Blacksmith
- Tom Monroe as Guard
- Stanley Blystone as Rancher

== Comic book adaptation ==
- Fawcett: Powder River Rustlers (1950)
