= Rustlers of Devil's Canyon =

1947 film by R. G. Springsteen

- Theatrical release poster
- Directed by: R. G. Springsteen
- Screenplay by: Earle Snell
- Produced by: Sidney Picker
- Starring: Allan Lane; Robert Blake; Martha Wentworth; Peggy Stewart; Arthur Space; Emmett Lynn
- Cinematography: William Bradford
- Edited by: Harry Keller
- Music by: Mort Glickman
- Production company: Republic Pictures
- Distributed by: Republic Pictures
- Release date: July 1, 1947
- Running time: 58 minutes
- Country: United States
- Language: English

Rustlers of Devil's Canyon is a 1947 American Western film in the Red Ryder film series directed by R. G. Springsteen and written by Earle Snell. The film stars Allan Lane, Robert Blake, Martha Wentworth, Peggy Stewart, Arthur Space and Emmett Lynn. The film was released on July 1, 1947, by Republic Pictures.

== Cast ==
- Allan Lane as Red Ryder
- Robert Blake as Little Beaver
- Martha Wentworth as The Duchess
- Peggy Stewart as Bess
- Arthur Space as Doc Cole
- Emmett Lynn as Blizzard
- Roy Barcroft as Land Agent Clark
- Tom London as The Sheriff
- Harry Carr as Tad
- Pierce Lyden as Henchman Matt
- Forrest Taylor as Dr. Glover
