= Sundown in Santa Fe =

1948 film by R. G. Springsteen

- Theatrical release poster
- Directed by: R. G. Springsteen
- Screenplay by: Norman S. Hall
- Produced by: Melville Tucker
- Starring: Allan Lane; Eddy Waller; Roy Barcroft; Trevor Bardette; Jean Dean; Russell Simpson
- Cinematography: John MacBurnie
- Edited by: Irving M. Schoenberg
- Music by: Stanley Wilson
- Production company: Republic Pictures
- Distributed by: Republic Pictures
- Release date: November 5, 1948
- Running time: 60 minutes
- Country: United States
- Language: English

Sundown in Santa Fe is a 1948 American Western film directed by R. G. Springsteen, written by Norman S. Hall, and starring Allan Lane, Eddy Waller, Roy Barcroft, Trevor Bardette, Jean Dean and Russell Simpson. It was released on November 5, 1948 by Republic Pictures.

== Cast ==
- Allan Lane as Rocky Lane
- Black Jack as Black Jack
- Eddy Waller as Horace Harvey 'Nugget' Clark
- Roy Barcroft as Tracy Gillette
- Trevor Bardette as Walter Surrat aka John Stuart
- Jean Dean as Lola Gillette
- Russell Simpson as Sheriff Jim Wyatt
- Rand Brooks as Tom Wyatt
- Lane Bradford as Bronc Owens
- B.G. Norman as Johnny Wyatt
- Minerva Urecal as Ella Mae Watson
- Joseph Crehan as Major Larkin
