= Frontier Investigator =

1949 film by Fred C. Brannon

- Theatrical release poster
- Directed by: Fred C. Brannon
- Screenplay by: Robert Creighton Williams
- Produced by: Gordon Kay
- Starring: Allan Lane; Eddy Waller; Roy Barcroft; Gail Davis; Robert Emmett Keane; Clayton Moore
- Cinematography: Ernest Miller
- Edited by: Arthur Roberts
- Music by: Stanley Wilson
- Production company: Republic Pictures
- Distributed by: Republic Pictures
- Release date: May 2, 1949
- Running time: 60 minutes
- Country: United States
- Language: English

Frontier Investigator is a 1949 American Western film directed by Fred C. Brannon and written by Robert Creighton Williams. The film stars Allan Lane, Eddy Waller, Roy Barcroft, Gail Davis, Robert Emmett Keane and Clayton Moore. The film was released on May 2, 1949, by Republic Pictures.

== Cast ==
- Allan Lane as Rocky Lane
- Black Jack as Black Jack
- Eddy Waller as Nugget Clark
- Roy Barcroft as Flint Fleming
- Gail Davis as Janet Adams
- Robert Emmett Keane as Erskine Doubleday
- Clayton Moore as Scott Garnett
- Francis Ford as Ed Garnett
- Claire Whitney as Molly Bright
- Harry Lauter as Rocky's Brother
- Tom London as Jed
- George Lloyd as Milton Leffingwell
- Marshall Reed as Henchman
