= Salt Lake Raiders =

1950 film by Fred C. Brannon

- Theatrical release poster
- Directed by: Fred C. Brannon
- Screenplay by: M. Coates Webster
- Produced by: Gordon Kay
- Starring: Allan Lane
- Cinematography: John MacBurnie
- Edited by: Richard L. Van Enger
- Music by: Stanley Wilson
- Production company: Republic Pictures
- Distributed by: Republic Pictures
- Release date: May 1, 1950 (United States)
- Running time: 60 minutes
- Country: United States
- Language: English

Salt Lake Raiders is a 1950 American Western film directed by Fred C. Brannon and starring Allan Lane.

== Plot ==
Ghost-town crooks make a lawman (Allan "Rocky" Lane), a falsely accused escaped convict (Myron Healey), and an old coot (Eddy Waller) look for hidden gold.

== Cast ==
- Allan Lane as Deputy Marshal Rocky Lane
- Black Jack as Black Jack
- Eddy Waller as Nugget Clark
- Roy Barcroft as Brit Condor
- Martha Hyer as Helen Thornton
- Byron Foulger as Lawyer John Sutton
- Myron Healey as Fred Mason
- Clifton Young as Luke Condor
- Stanley Andrews as Chief Marshal
- Rory Mallinson as Sheriff
- Kenneth MacDonald as Deputy Marshal Tom
- George Chesebro as Stage Driver Ben
