= Santa Fe Uprising =

1946 film by R. G. Springsteen

- Theatrical release poster
- Directed by: R. G. Springsteen
- Screenplay by: Earle Snell
- Produced by: Sidney Picker
- Starring: Allan Lane; Robert Blake; Martha Wentworth; Barton MacLane; Jack La Rue; Tom London
- Cinematography: Bud Thackery
- Edited by: William P. Thompson
- Music by: Mort Glickman
- Production company: Republic Pictures
- Distributed by: Republic Pictures
- Release date: November 15, 1946
- Running time: 56 minutes
- Country: United States
- Language: English

Santa Fe Uprising is a 1946 American Western film in the Red Ryder film series directed by R. G. Springsteen, written by Earle Snell, and starring Allan Lane, Robert Blake, Martha Wentworth, Barton MacLane, Jack La Rue and Tom London. It was released on November 15, 1946, by Republic Pictures.

== Plot ==
A scheming newspaper publisher, Crawford, conspires with the wealthy Madison Pike and a pair of henchmen, Jackson and Case, to make the New Mexico Territory's citizens of Bitter Springs pay a toll to use a private road. Pike is then ambushed and killed.

Red Ryder's aunt, a rancher known to all as The Duchess, believes herself to be Pike's only legal heir. When she sends Red to stake her claim, Crawford and others attempt to ruin her, then kill her, but Red and sidekick Little Beaver head off her runaway stagecoach.

Red is appointed town marshal and attempts to get to the bottom of a scheme. Little Beaver is kidnapped by Jackson, but by pretending to be shot with a gun filled with blanks, Red is able to surprise the killers and thieves and restore order to Bitter Springs.

== Cast ==
- Allan Lane as Red Ryder
- Robert Blake as Little Beaver
- Martha Wentworth as The Duchess
- Barton MacLane as Crawford
- Jack La Rue as Bruce Jackson
- Tom London as Lafe Dibble
- Dick Curtis as Henchman Luke Case
- Forrest Taylor as Moore
- Emmett Lynn as Deputy Hank
- Hank Patterson as Deputy Jake
- Pat Michaels as Sonny Dibble
- Edmund Cobb as Madison Pike
- Kenne Duncan as Rustler talking with Jackson
- Edythe Elliott as Mrs. Dibble
