= Bandits of the West =

1953 film by Harry Keller

- Film poster
- Directed by: Harry Keller
- Written by: Gerald Geraghty
- Produced by: Rudy Ralston
- Starring: Allan Lane; Cathy Downs; Eddy Waller
- Cinematography: Bud Thackery
- Edited by: Tony Martinelli
- Music by: Stanley Wilson
- Production company: Republic Pictures
- Distributed by: Republic Pictures
- Release date: August 8, 1953
- Running time: 54 minutes
- Country: United States
- Language: English

Bandits of the West is a 1953 American Western film directed by Harry Keller and starring Allan Lane, Cathy Downs and Eddy Waller.

The film's sets were designed by the art director James W. Sullivan.

== Cast ==
- Allan Lane as Marshal Rocky Lane
- Black Jack as Rocky's Horse
- Eddy Waller as Nugget Clark
- Cathy Downs as Joanne Collier
- Roy Barcroft as Bud Galloway
- Trevor Bardette as Jeff Chadwick
- Ray Montgomery as Steve Edrington
- Byron Foulger as Eric Strikler
- Harry Harvey as Judge Walters
- Robert Bice as Henchman Dutch
- Lane Bradford as Henchman
- Roy Bucko as Townsman
- Edward Clark as John Anders
- Wade Crosby as Big Jim Foley
- Art Dillard as Henchman Kirby
- Kenneth MacDonald as Nugget's Assistant
- Jack Montgomery as Townsman
- Jack Perrin as Townsman Ned
- Lee Phelps as Rancher
- Aack Tornek as Townsman

== Bibliography ==
- Bernard A. Drew. Motion Picture Series and Sequels: A Reference Guide. Routledge, 2013.
