= Marshal of Cripple Creek =

1947 film

- Theatrical release poster
- Directed by: R. G. Springsteen
- Screenplay by: Earle Snell
- Produced by: Sidney Picker
- Starring: Allan Lane; Robert Blake; Martha Wentworth; Trevor Bardette; Tom London; Roy Barcroft
- Cinematography: William Bradford
- Edited by: Harold Minter
- Music by: Mort Glickman
- Production company: Republic Pictures
- Distributed by: Republic Pictures
- Release date: August 15, 1947
- Running time: 56 minutes
- Country: United States
- Language: English

Marshal of Cripple Creek is a 1947 American Western film in the Red Ryder film series directed by R. G. Springsteen and written by Earle Snell. The film stars Allan Lane, Robert Blake, Martha Wentworth, Trevor Bardette, Tom London and Roy Barcroft. The film was released on August 15, 1947, by Republic Pictures.

== Cast ==
- Allan Lane as Red Ryder
- Robert Blake as Little Beaver
- Martha Wentworth as Duchess Wentworth
- Trevor Bardette as Tom Lambert
- Tom London as Baker
- Roy Barcroft as Henchman Sweeney
- Gene Roth as Long John Case
- William Self as Dick Lambert
- Helen Wallace as Mae Lambert
