= Oklahoma Badlands =

1948 film by Yakima Canutt

- Theatrical release poster
- Directed by: Yakima Canutt
- Screenplay by: Robert Creighton Williams
- Produced by: Gordon Kay
- Starring: Allan Lane; Eddy Waller; Mildred Coles; Roy Barcroft; Gene Roth; Earle Hodgins
- Cinematography: John MacBurnie
- Edited by: Arthur Roberts
- Music by: Mort Glickman
- Production company: Republic Pictures
- Distributed by: Republic Pictures
- Release date: February 22, 1948
- Running time: 59 minutes
- Country: United States
- Language: English

Oklahoma Badlands is a 1948 American Western film directed by Yakima Canutt and written by Robert Creighton Williams. The film stars Allan Lane, Eddy Waller, Mildred Coles, Roy Barcroft, Gene Roth and Earle Hodgins. The film was released on February 22, 1948, by Republic Pictures.

== Plot ==
Ken Rawlins is talking to his ranch foreman, Nugget, about the recent murder of his father. Rustlers show up and steal a herd of cattle. Frustrated at the situation, Ken Rawlins sends a message off to his friend, Rocky Lane, asking for help. Shortly afterwards, he is murdered by one of the rustlers while his ranch-hand, Sharkey, keeps him distracted.

Nugget reveals to newspaperman Oliver Budge that there is another heir to the ranch, Leslie Rawlins from out east, and that they are coming in on the stage. The rustlers attempt to stop the stage to kill Rawlins, but are stopped when Lane arrives. He then finds out that Rawlins is a woman and decides to take advantage of everyone believing her to be a man. He takes her place as the new heir and has her pose as his housekeeper to keep her safe while he investigates the murders.

They arrive at the ranch to find the workers ready to walk out. Sharkey picks a fight with Lane, but Lane beats him and gives him his owed pay before firing him. The rest of the ranch-hands agree to stay on and give him a chance to fix the situation at the ranch. Nugget is unhappy with his new "housekeeper" but Rawlins puts up with him to keep maintaining their cover. Nugget tells Lane that they owe a debt on the ranch and the payment is due tomorrow.

Sharkey goes to Budge, who is the mastermind behind the rustlers, who admits that he bought up the note on the ranch so he can seize it when they fail to pay. He sends Sharkey and henchman Sanders to kill Lane so he can't pay off the debt. They leave a letter to lure him into an ambush. Nugget holds Lane up at the ranch to teach him how to shoot and ride horses, believing him to be the city-raised Rawlins. Lane eventually manages to get rid of Nugget and goes to meet the ambush. Sharkey tries to trick Lane into disarming the same way he did to Ken Rawlins, but it fails and they end up in a shoot-out. Sharkey is killed, but Sanders gets away.

Sanders, who was the one to stop the stage on its way in, reveals to Budge that Lane isn't the real Leslie Rawlins. Lane and Nugget discover the rustlers changed the brands on their cattle to hide them and make plans to steal them back. Nugget unknowingly reveals their plan to Budge, who tells Sanders to stop them. Sanders and his rustlers try to stop the ranch-hands from moving the cattle, but Lane shows up and helps fight them off.

Budge has his men steal the money for the ranch from Lane. He then hires an actor to pretend to be Leslie Rawlins's uncle to expose that Lane is an imposter. The sheriff takes him into custody. Nugget remembers Lane's name as the friend Ken Rawlins had sent for and goes to stop him from being arrested. Together, they rescue the real Leslie Rawlins from Sanders and catch both him and Budge. Nugget then learns that the "housekeeper" he's been feuding with is in reality the owner of the ranch and his new boss.

== Cast ==
- Allan Lane as Allan Rocky Lane
- Black Jack as Rocky's Stallion Black Jack
- Eddy Waller as Nugget
- Mildred Coles as Leslie Rawlins
- Roy Barcroft as Henchman Sanders
- Gene Roth as Oliver Budge
- Earle Hodgins as Jonathan Walpole
- Dale Van Sickel as Henchman Sharkey
- Jay Kirby as Ken Rawlins
- Claire Whitney as Agatha Scragg
- Terry Frost as Sheriff
- Hank Patterson as Postmaster Fred
- House Peters, Jr. as The Dude
- Jack Kirk as Stage Driver Parker
