= Renegades of Sonora =

1948 film by R. G. Springsteen

- Theatrical release poster
- Directed by: R. G. Springsteen
- Screenplay by: M. Coates Webster
- Produced by: Gordon Kay
- Starring: Allan Lane; Eddy Waller; Roy Barcroft; Frank Fenton; Mauritz Hugo; George J. Lewis
- Cinematography: John MacBurnie
- Edited by: Tony Martinelli
- Music by: Stanley Wilson
- Production company: Republic Pictures
- Distributed by: Republic Pictures
- Release date: November 24, 1948
- Running time: 60 minutes
- Country: United States
- Language: English

Renegades of Sonora is a 1948 American Western film directed by R. G. Springsteen and written by M. Coates Webster. The film stars Allan Lane, Eddy Waller, Roy Barcroft, Frank Fenton, Mauritz Hugo and George J. Lewis. The film was released on November 24, 1948 by Republic Pictures.

== Cast ==
- Allan Lane as Rocky Lane
- Black Jack as Black Jack
- Eddy Waller as Nugget Clark
- Roy Barcroft as George Keeler
- Frank Fenton as Sheriff Jim Crawford
- Mauritz Hugo as Henchman Pete Lasker
- George J. Lewis as Chief Eagle Claw
- Mike Ragan as Henchman
- Dale Van Sickel as Brad
- Marshall Reed as Deputy
- House Peters, Jr. as Courier
