= Leadville Gunslinger =

1952 film by Harry Keller

- Theatrical release poster
- Directed by: Harry Keller
- Written by: M. Coates Webster
- Produced by: Harry Keller
- Starring: Allan Lane; Elaine Riley; Eddy Waller
- Cinematography: Bud Thackery
- Edited by: Robert M. Leeds
- Music by: Stanley Wilson
- Production company: Republic Pictures
- Distributed by: Republic Pictures
- Release date: March 22, 1952
- Running time: 54 minutes
- Country: United States
- Language: English

Leadville Gunslinger is a 1952 American Western film directed by Harry Keller and starring Allan Lane, Elaine Riley and Eddy Waller.

== Cast ==
- Allan Lane as U. S. Marshal Rocky Lane
- Black Jack as Rocky's Horse
- Eddy Waller as Nugget Clark
- Grant Withers as Jonathan Graves
- Elaine Riley as Carol Davis
- Roy Barcroft as Chet Yonker / Pete Yonker
- Richard Crane as Jim Blanchard
- I. Stanford Jolley as Cliff Saunders
- Kenneth MacDonald as Sheriff Nichols
- Mickey Simpson as Henchman Monk
- Ed Hinton as Deputy Ned Smith
- Art Dillard as Sentry
- Wes Hudman as Stagecoach Driver
- Al Ferguson as Peters
- Frank O'Connor as Murdered Banker

== Reception ==
In the New York Daily News, critic Dorothy Masters wrote: "Although there's very little that's new ... Lane adds zest to the familiar routine and Republic backs him up with exciting presentation and good casting."
