= Secret Service Investigator =

1948 film by R. G. Springsteen

- Theatrical release poster
- Directed by: R. G. Springsteen
- Screenplay by: John K. Butler
- Story by: John K. Butler
- Produced by: Sidney Picker
- Starring: Lynne Roberts; Lloyd Bridges; George Zucco; June Storey; Trevor Bardette; John Kellogg
- Cinematography: John MacBurnie
- Edited by: Arthur Roberts
- Production company: Republic Pictures
- Distributed by: Republic Pictures
- Release date: May 31, 1948
- Running time: 60 minutes
- Country: United States
- Language: English

Secret Service Investigator is a 1948 American crime film directed by R. G. Springsteen and written by John K. Butler. The film stars Lynne Roberts, Lloyd Bridges, George Zucco, June Storey, Trevor Bardette and John Kellogg. The film was released on May 31, 1948 by Republic Pictures.

== Cast ==
- Lynne Roberts as Susan Lane
- Lloyd Bridges as Steve Mallory / Dan Redfern
- George Zucco as Otto Dagoff
- June Storey as Laura Deering Redfern
- Trevor Bardette as Henry Witzel
- John Kellogg as Benny Deering
- Jack Overman as Herman
- Roy Barcroft as Al Turk
- Douglas Evans as Secret Service Inspector Crehan
- Milton Parsons as Miller
- James Flavin as Police Inspector Thorndyke
- William "Billy" Benedict as Counterman
- Minerva Urecal as Mrs. McGiven
- Tommy Ivo as Teddy Lane
- Sam McDaniel as Porter
