= Gunmen of Abilene =

1950 film by Fred C. Brannon

- Theatrical release poster
- Directed by: Fred C. Brannon
- Screenplay by: M. Coates Webster
- Produced by: Gordon Kay
- Starring: Allan Lane; Eddy Waller; Roy Barcroft; Donna Hamilton; Peter Brocco; Selmer Jackson
- Cinematography: Ellis W. Carter
- Edited by: Irving M. Schoenberg
- Music by: Stanley Wilson
- Production company: Republic Pictures
- Distributed by: Republic Pictures
- Release date: February 6, 1950
- Running time: 60 minutes
- Country: United States
- Language: English

Gunmen of Abilene is a 1950 American Western film directed by Fred C. Brannon and written by M. Coates Webster. The film stars Allan Lane, Eddy Waller, Roy Barcroft, Donna Hamilton, Peter Brocco and Selmer Jackson. It was released on February 6, 1950, by Republic Pictures.

== Cast ==
- Allan Lane as Rocky Lane
- Black Jack as Rocky Lane's Stallion
- Eddy Waller as Sheriff Nugget Clark
- Roy Barcroft as Brink Fallon
- Donna Hamilton as Mary Clark
- Peter Brocco as Henry Turner
- Selmer Jackson as Dr. Johnson
- Duncan Richardson as Dickie Harper
- Arthur Walsh as Tim Johnson
- Don C. Harvey as Henchman Todd
- Don Dillaway as Bill Harper
- George Chesebro as Martin
- Steve Clark as Wells
