= Rough Riders of Durango =

1951 film by Fred C. Brannon

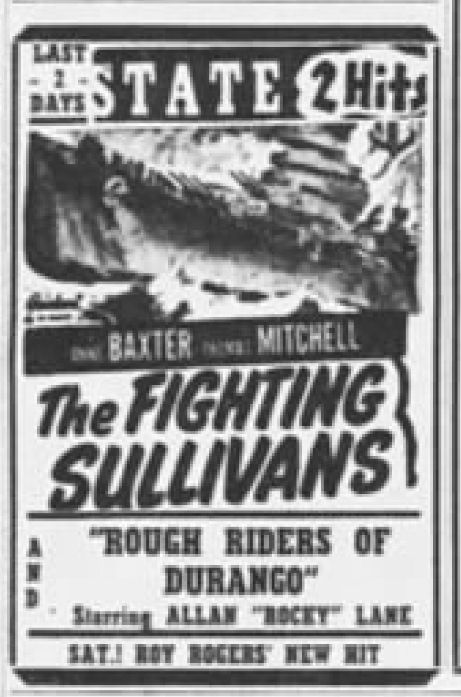
- Newspaper advertisement with Rough Riders of Durango as second feature
- Directed by: Fred C. Brannon
- Screenplay by: M. Coates Webster
- Produced by: Gordon Kay
- Starring: Allan Lane; Walter Baldwin; Aline Towne; Steve Darrell; Ross Ford; Denver Pyle
- Cinematography: John MacBurnie
- Edited by: Irving M. Schoenberg
- Music by: Stanley Wilson
- Production company: Republic Pictures
- Distributed by: Republic Pictures
- Release date: January 30, 1951
- Running time: 60 minutes
- Country: United States
- Language: English

Rough Riders of Durango is a 1951 American Western film directed by Fred C. Brannon, written by M. Coates Webster and starring Allan Lane, Walter Baldwin, Aline Towne, Steve Darrell, Ross Ford and Denver Pyle. The film was released on January 30, 1951 by Republic Pictures.

== Cast ==
- Allan Lane as Rocky Lane
- Black Jack as Rocky's Stallion
- Walter Baldwin as Cricket Adams
- Aline Towne as Janis Adams
- Steve Darrell as John Blake
- Ross Ford as Sheriff Bill Walters
- Denver Pyle as Henchman Lacey
- Stuart Randall as Henchman Jed
- Hal Price as Johnson
- Tom London as Rancher Evans
- Russ Whiteman as Jim Carter
- Dale Van Sickel as Henchman Willis
