= The Bold Frontiersman =

1948 film by Philip Ford

- Theatrical release poster
- Directed by: Philip Ford
- Screenplay by: Robert Creighton Williams
- Produced by: Gordon Kay
- Starring: Allan Lane; Eddy Waller; Roy Barcroft; John Alvin; Francis McDonald; Fred Graham
- Cinematography: Ernest Miller
- Edited by: Arthur Roberts
- Music by: Mort Glickman
- Production company: Republic Pictures
- Distributed by: Republic Pictures
- Release date: April 15, 1948
- Running time: 59 minutes
- Country: United States
- Language: English

The Bold Frontiersman is a 1948 American Western film directed by Philip Ford and written by Robert Creighton Williams. The film stars Allan Lane, Eddy Waller, Roy Barcroft, John Alvin, Francis McDonald and Fred Graham. The film was released on April 15, 1948, by Republic Pictures.

== Cast ==
- Allan Lane as Rocky Lane
- Black Jack as Black Jack
- Eddy Waller as Sheriff Nugget Clark
- Roy Barcroft as Smiling Jim
- John Alvin as Don Post
- Francis McDonald as Adam Post
- Fred Graham as Henchman Smokey
- Ed Cassidy as Mort Harris
- Edmund Cobb as Deputy Pete
- Harold Goodwin as Poker Player
- Jack Kirk as Poker Player
- Ken Terrell as Bartender Judd
- Marshall Reed as Jailbreak Henchman
- Al Murphy as Saloon Piano Player
