= Fort Dodge Stampede =

1951 film by Harry Keller

- Theatrical release poster
- Directed by: Harry Keller
- Written by: Richard Wormser
- Produced by: Harry Keller
- Starring: Allan Lane
- Cinematography: John MacBurnie
- Edited by: Irving M. Schoenberg
- Distributed by: Republic Pictures
- Release date: August 24, 1951
- Running time: 60 minutes
- Country: United States
- Language: English

Fort Dodge Stampede is a 1951 Western film produced and directed by Harry Keller and starring Allan Lane, one of 34 B-movie Westerns filmed between 1947 and 1953 featuring Allan "Rocky" Lane and his horse Black Jack.

Despite the title, no stampede occurs or is mentioned in the film.

== Plot ==
The Pike gang steal $30,000 from the Adams Bank, but one of them double-crosses the rest of the gang and hides the money in Fort Dodge, Nevada. As Fort Dodge is out of his jurisdiction, Deputy sheriff Rocky Lane takes a vacation there and finds that everything is owned by Skeeter Davis, who does not know about the hidden money. The Pike gang is also in town in search of the money. When settlers arrive in town, Rocky devises a plan to catch the outlaws and retrieve the money for the bank.

== Cast ==
- Allan Lane as Deputy Sheriff 'Rocky' Lane
- Black Jack as Rocky's horse
- Chubby Johnson as 'Skeeter' Davis
- Mary Ellen Kay as Natalie Bryan
- Roy Barcroft as Henchman Pike Hardin
- Trevor Bardette as 'Sparkler' McCann
- Bruce Edwards as Jeff Bryan
- Wes Hudman as Henchman Butler
- William Forrest as W. I. Hutchinson
- Chuck Roberson as Henchman Ragan
- Rory Mallinson as Sheriff
- Jack Ingram as Henchman Cox
- Kermit Maynard as Wagon Train Scout
