= Navajo Trail Raiders =

1949 film by R. G. Springsteen

- Theatrical release poster
- Directed by: R. G. Springsteen
- Screenplay by: M. Coates Webster
- Produced by: Gordon Kay
- Starring: Allan Lane; Eddy Waller; Robert Emmett Keane; Barbara Bestar; Harold Landon; Dick Curtis
- Cinematography: John MacBurnie
- Edited by: Arthur Roberts
- Music by: Stanley Wilson
- Production company: Republic Pictures
- Distributed by: Republic Pictures
- Release date: October 15, 1949
- Running time: 60 minutes
- Country: United States
- Language: English

Navajo Trail Raiders is a 1949 American Western film directed by R. G. Springsteen and written by M. Coates Webster. The film stars Allan Lane, Eddy Waller, Robert Emmett Keane, Barbara Bestar, Harold Landon and Dick Curtis. The film was released on October 15, 1949, by Republic Pictures.

== Cast ==
- Allan Lane as Rocky Lane
- Black Jack as Black Jack
- Eddy Waller as Nugget Clark
- Robert Emmett Keane as John Blanford
- Barbara Bestar as Judy Clark
- Harold Landon as Tom Stanley
- Dick Curtis as Henchman Brad
- Dennis Moore as Frank Stanley
- Ted Adams as Sheriff Robbins
- Forrest Taylor as Sam Brynes
- Marshall Reed as Henchman Jed
- Steve Clark as Larkin
