= Wheaton Chambers =

American actor (1887–1958)

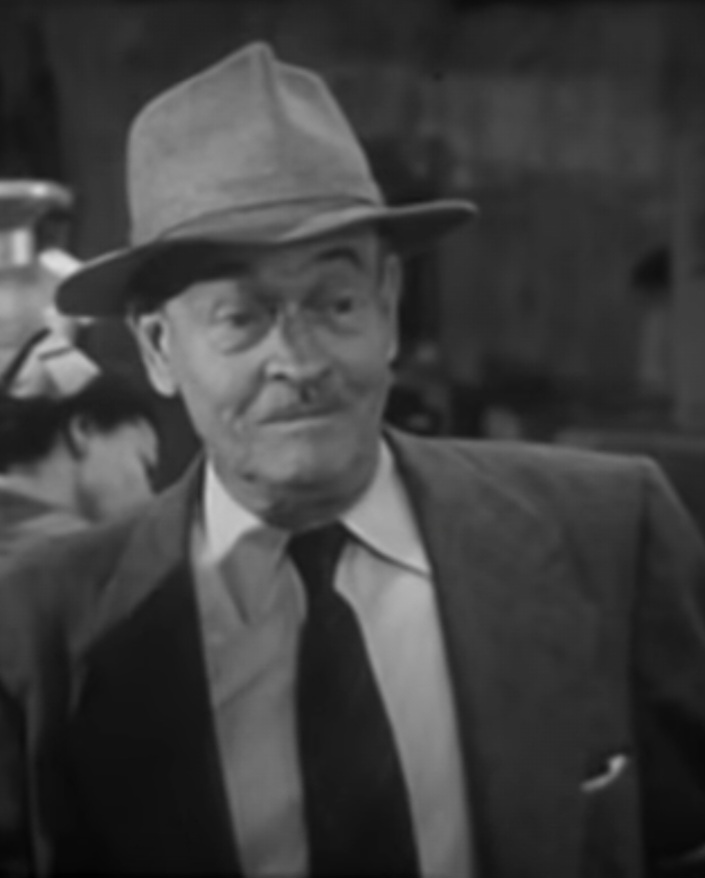
- Chambers in the television series Medic in "Flash of Darkness", 1954
- Born: James Wheaton Chambers; October 13, 1887; Philadelphia, Pennsylvania, U.S.
- Died: January 31, 1958 (aged 70); Hollywood, California, U.S.
- Resting place: Maplewood Cemetery, Freehold, New Jersey
- Occupation: Actor
- Years active: 1935–1958

James Wheaton Chambers (October 13, 1887 – January 31, 1958) was an American actor during the 1930s, 1940s, and 1950s. He appeared in more than 200 films and television series during his career.

== Early years ==
Chambers was born on October 13, 1887, in Philadelphia, Pennsylvania, to a Philadelphia Main Line family.

He graduated from Princeton University in 1909. with a bachelor of arts degree. While there, he was captain of a championship swimming team. In 1909, he went to China to work with marines and soldiers of the Legation Guards as part of Princeton's YMCA work in Peking. After he had to leave because of the 1911 Revolution, he worked for the Associated Press.

== Career ==
Chambers gained early acting experience with the Henry Duffy Players.

He made his film debut in the small role of a servant in the 1935 film The Florentine Dagger. Over the next 23 years he would appear in almost 150 feature films. Some of his more notable roles include: as Dr. Allen in Marshal of Laredo (1945), one of the series of Red Ryder films; as Lewis Havener in the 1946 fantasy-horror film The Flying Serpent; as Jasper Braydon in Stagecoach to Denver, a 1946 western directed by R. G. Springsteen; as Doctor William R. James in the 1951 film noir The Prowler, starring Van Heflin; as Sam Wilkins in the 1952 western Wagons West, starring Rod Cameron; and as Doc Runyon in the western The Peacemaker (1956).

Other notable films in which Chambers appeared include: the 1936 biopic, The Story of Louis Pasteur, starring Paul Muni; as a lawyer in Cecil B. DeMille's Reap the Wild Wind (1942), starring Ray Milland, John Wayne, and Paulette Goddard; as a reporter in the 1943 version of the classic, Phantom of the Opera, starring Nelson Eddy, Susanna Foster, and Claude Rains; in the Abbott and Costello comedy, Abbott and Costello in Hollywood; Michael Curtiz' 1945 classic, Mildred Pierce, starring Joan Crawford, Jack Carson, and Zachary Scott; in the 1945 Rodgers and Hammerstein musical, State Fair (1945), starring Jeanne Crain and Dana Andrews; the 1945 romantic comedy Lover Come Back, starring George Brent and Lucille Ball; Curtiz' 1946 biopic about Cole Porter, Night and Day, starring Cary Grant and Alexis Smith; the classic film noir Lady in the Lake (1947), starring and directed by Robert Montgomery; the 1948 classic version of The Three Musketeers, starring Gene Kelly, Lana Turner and June Allyson; the 1949 Fred Astaire and Ginger Rogers musical The Barkleys of Broadway; DeMille's 1950 epic, Samson and Delilah, starring Hedy Lamarr and Victor Mature; the science fiction classic, The Day the Earth Stood Still (1951), starring Michael Rennie and Patricia Neal; Elia Kazan's classic East of Eden, starring Julie Harris, James Dean (in his first major screen role), and Raymond Massey; and the 1956 classic western The Fastest Gun Alive, starring Glenn Ford, Jeanne Crain and Broderick Crawford.

In addition to his feature film work, Chambers also appeared in several film shorts, and film serials. The serials in which he appeared include: as Dr. Humphrey in Drums of Fu Manchu (1940); as Boswell in Adventures of Red Ryder (1940), as Professor Benjamin in The Purple Monster Strikes (1945); as Wilson in The Crimson Ghost (1946); and in the featured role of Caleb Baldwin in Son of Zorro (1947).

Chambers' debut on the small screen was in the featured role of Father Batista in the eighth episode of the classic television western, The Lone Ranger, in 1949. Other television shows he appeared on include: two episodes of The Roy Rogers Show in 1952, in different roles; as a member of the Kryptonian council on the first episode of Adventures of Superman; on two episodes (in different roles) of Hopalong Cassidy in 1952–53; as Papa Dodger in the premiere episode of the situation comedy Willy in September 1954; as Mr. Kennedy in a December 1954 episode of The George Burns and Gracie Allen Show; and a February 1957 episode of the crime drama, Dragnet.

Chambers' last performance was in a small role in the 1958 film, Gunman's Walk, starring Van Heflin and Tab Hunter. Chambers had worked on the film in December 1957, and it was released in July, 1958, six months after his death.

== Death ==
On January 31, 1958, Chambers died after a brief illness. He was 70 years old and was survived by a sister. He was buried in Maplewood Cemetery, Freehold, New Jersey, Freehold Township, in Monmouth County, New Jersey.
