= Hills of Oklahoma =

1950 film by R. G. Springsteen

- Theatrical release poster
- Directed by: R. G. Springsteen
- Screenplay by: Olive Cooper; Victor Arthur
- Story by: Olive Cooper
- Produced by: Franklin Adreon
- Starring: Rex Allen; Elisabeth Fraser; Elisabeth Risdon; Robert Karnes; Fuzzy Knight; Roscoe Ates
- Cinematography: Ellis W. Carter
- Edited by: Arthur Roberts
- Music by: Stanley Wilson
- Production company: Republic Pictures
- Distributed by: Republic Pictures
- Release date: June 1, 1950
- Running time: 67 minutes
- Country: United States
- Language: English

Hills of Oklahoma is a 1950 American Western film directed by R. G. Springsteen and written by Olive Cooper and Victor Arthur. The film stars Rex Allen, Elisabeth Fraser, Elisabeth Risdon, Robert Karnes, Fuzzy Knight and Roscoe Ates. It was released on June 1, 1950 by Republic Pictures.

== Cast ==
- Rex Allen as Rex Allen
- Koko as Rex Allen's Horse
- Elisabeth Fraser as Sharon Forbes
- Elisabeth Risdon as Kate Carney
- Robert Karnes as Brock Stevens
- Fuzzy Knight as Jiggs Endicott
- Roscoe Ates as Dismal
- Robert Emmett Keane as Charles Stevens
- Trevor Bardette as Hank Peters
- Lee Phelps as Rancher Scotty Davis
- Edmund Cobb as Rancher Johnson
- Rex Lease as Joe Brant
- Ted Adams as Henchman Sam
- Lane Bradford as Henchman Webb
- Michael Carr as Tommy
- Johnny Downs as Square Dance Caller
