= Carson City Raiders =

1948 film by Yakima Canutt

- Theatrical release poster
- Directed by: Yakima Canutt
- Screenplay by: Earle Snell
- Produced by: Gordon Kay
- Starring: Allan Lane; Eddy Waller; Frank Reicher; Beverly Jons; Harold Landon; Steve Darrell
- Cinematography: William Bradford
- Edited by: Tony Martinelli
- Production company: Republic Pictures
- Distributed by: Republic Pictures
- Release date: May 13, 1948 (United States)
- Running time: 60 minutes
- Country: United States
- Language: English

Carson City Raiders is a 1948 American Western film, directed by Yakima Canutt and written by Earle Snell. The film stars: Allan Lane, Eddy Waller, Frank Reicher, Beverly Jons, Harold Landon and Steve Darrell.

== Plot ==
One of the Allan "Rocky" lane series of B-westerns, this has a cast of characters that go beyond the simple hero-villain plots. Steve Darrell, a busy character actor listed seventh in the cast (even below Rocky's horse), is actually the movie's central character: a man tapped to replace a murdered sheriff. When the bad guys realize he's a reformed outlaw, they think they can blackmail him into helping them. Rocky figures it out first, and they join forces. Harold Goodwin stands in for the usual action heavy 'Roy Barcroft' in this one, and has such lines as (when he's supposed to rub out a captured outlaw who might talk): "Too bad, I was just gettin' to know the guy !"

== Cast ==
- Allan Lane as Rocky Lane
- Black Jack as Rocky's Horse
- Eddy Waller as Nugget Clark
- Frank Reicher as Razor the Barber
- Beverly Jons as Mildred Drew
- Harold Landon as Jimmy Davis
- Steve Darrell as Tom Drew aka Fargo Jack
- Harold Goodwin as Dave Starky
- Dale Van Sickel as Henchman Brennan
- Tom Chatterton as John Davis
- Edmund Cobb as Old Sheriff
- Mike Ragan as Joe
- Robert J. Wilke as Ed Noble
