= Stagecoach to Denver =

1946 film by R. G. Springsteen

- Film poster
- Directed by: R. G. Springsteen
- Written by: Fred Harman (characters); Earle Snell (original screenplay)
- Produced by: Sidney Picker (associate producer)
- Starring: See below
- Cinematography: Edgar Lyons
- Edited by: Lester Orlebeck
- Music by: Mort Glickman
- Release date: December 23, 1946 (United States)
- Running time: 56 minutes
- Country: United States
- Language: English

Stagecoach to Denver is a 1946 American Western film and one of the Republic Pictures Red Ryder film series directed by R. G. Springsteen.

== Plot ==
Red is working as a stagecoach driver with one of his passengers being Dickie, a recently orphaned young child travelling on his own. Red puts him on the inaugural stagecoach from Elkhorn to Denver, Colorado where he will meet his only surviving relative, an Aunt that he has never met. Dickie is riding with the Land Commissioner on his way to Denver to report the dishonest dealings of the town's boss Big Bill Lambert. Lambert owns the new Denver stagecoach line so he can control communications as the telegraph line to Denver has not been opened, and wants to ensure that the Land Commissioner does not make it to Denver.

One of Big Bill's henchmen stops the stage on the excuse that the driver forgot a bag of US Mail. Once the driver places the bag of mail with the other mail sacks the henchman sabotages the horse harness that leads to the stagecoach going off a cliff killing the driver and commissioner but leaving Dickie paralysed. The town Doctor's diagnosis is that Dickie's only chance to walk again would be a risky operation that can only be approved by Dickie's next of kin, the aunt in Denver. Red has the idea to use the telegraph at a mine that has a connection with a mine near Denver where the news requiring Dickie's Aunt and a new Land Commissioner to come to Elkhorn can be relayed. Worried about the Commissioner's message, Big Bill sends some henchmen to stop Red from sending his message but fail miserably.

In Denver, Big Bill's associates have the idea to waylay the stagecoach carrying the real replacement Land Commissioner and Aunt and replace them with an impersonator to masquerade as a Land Commissioner and to establish his veracity, sends a tough woman in the gang to impersonate the Aunt. Once in town the phony Commissioner follows Big Bill's orders to resurvey the lands of the area for Big Bill's benefit, but the woman impersonating the Aunt is touched and reformed by Dickie and endangers herself when she won't go along with Big Bill's schemes and stands up to him.

== Cast ==
- Allan Lane as Red Ryder
- Robert Blake as Little Beaver
- Martha Wentworth as The Duchess (Red's Aunt)
- Roy Barcroft as Big Bill Lambert
- Peggy Stewart as "Beautiful" (the fake May Barnes)
- Emmett Lynn as Coonskin
- Ted Adams as Sheriff
- Edmund Cobb as Henchman Duke
- Tom Chatterton as "Doc" Kimball
- Robert Hyatt as Dickie
- George Chesebro as Henchman Blackie Grubb
- Ed Cassidy as Land Commissioner Felton
- Wheaton Chambers as Jasper Braydon
- Forrest Taylor as Matt Disher (Rancher)
