= Oregon Trail Scouts =

1947 film by R. G. Springsteen

- Theatrical release poster
- Directed by: R. G. Springsteen
- Screenplay by: Earle Snell
- Produced by: Sidney Picker
- Starring: Allan Lane; Robert Blake; Martha Wentworth; Roy Barcroft; Emmett Lynn; Edmund Cobb
- Cinematography: Alfred S. Keller
- Edited by: Harold Minter
- Music by: Mort Glickman
- Production company: Republic Pictures
- Distributed by: Republic Pictures
- Release date: May 5, 1947
- Running time: 58 minutes
- Country: United States
- Language: English

Oregon Trail Scouts is a 1947 American Western film in the Red Ryder film series directed by R. G. Springsteen and written by Earle Snell. The film stars Allan Lane, Robert Blake, Martha Wentworth, Roy Barcroft, Emmett Lynn and Edmund Cobb. The film was released on May 5, 1947, by Republic Pictures.

== Cast ==
- Allan Lane as Red Ryder
- Robert Blake as Little Beaver
- Martha Wentworth as The Duchess
- Roy Barcroft as Bill Hunter
- Emmett Lynn as Bear Trap
- Edmund Cobb as Henchman Jack
- Earle Hodgins as The Judge
- Ed Cassidy as Mr. Bliss
- Frank Lackteen as Chief Running Fox
- Billy Cummings as Barking Squirrel
- Jack Kirk as Stagecoach Driver
