= Earle Hodgins =

American actor (1893–1964)

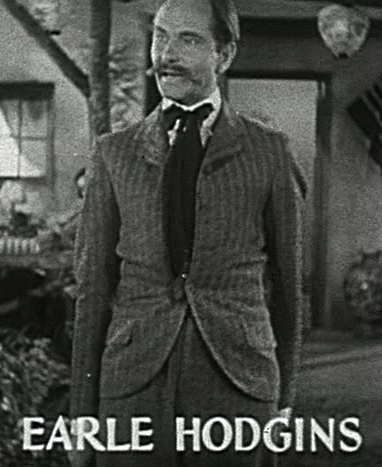
- Earle Hodgins in Oh, Susanna!
- Born: October 6, 1893; Salt Lake City, Utah, U.S.
- Died: April 14, 1964 (aged 70); Hollywood, California, U.S.
- Resting place: Valhalla Memorial Park Cemetery
- Occupation: Actor
- Years active: 1932–1963
- Spouse: Sue Hanley

Earle Hodgins (October 6, 1893 – April 14, 1964) was an American actor.

== Career ==
Early in his career, Hodgins was active in stock theater, including working in the Ralph Cloninger troupe of Salt Lake City, Utah, the Siegel Stock company of Seattle, Washington, and the Allen Players at the Empress Theatre in Vancouver, British Columbia, Canada.

He appeared in more than 330 films and television shows between 1932 and 1963. He specialized in playing fast-talking con men—often in westerns, such as The Lone Ranger, Judge Roy Bean, The Cisco Kid, The Adventures of Wild Bill Hickok, Rawhide, Maverick (in the episode "Shady Deal at Sunny Acres" with James Garner and Jack Kelly), Lawman, The Rifleman, Cheyenne, Have Gun – Will Travel, Gunsmoke (In a recurring role as the town judge, plus in the title role in “Uncle Oliver”, where he ambushes and shoots “Chester”), and Hopalong Cassidy. In 1959 Hodgins appeared as Mr. Fane on Lawman in the episode "The Outsider." In the 1960–1961 season, he appeared in three episodes of Joanne Dru's ABC sitcom, Guestward, Ho! as the aging ranch wrangler known as "Lonesome." In one of those episodes, "Lonesome's Gal", he was cast opposite ZaSu Pitts. Thereafter, the two died within a year of each other.

Hodgins' other television roles were as carnival barkers, medicine-show salesmen, and the like. He was known for shooing away obstreperous children from his stage, snapping at them, "Get away, son, ya bother me".

Hodgins married Sue Hanley, who was described in an article of the Salt Lake Telegram as "a Seattle society girl."

Hodgins was a member of the Church of Jesus Christ of Latter-day Saints.

== Selected filmography ==
- The Circus Clown (1934) (First credited film role)
- Paradise Canyon (1935)
- The Cyclone Ranger (1935)
- Aces and Eights (1936)
- Oh, Susanna! (1936)
- Border Caballero (1936)
- Ticket to Paradise (1936)
- I Cover the War (1937)
- Range Defenders (1937)
- Heroes of the Alamo (1937)
- A Lawman Is Born (1937)
- Round-Up Time in Texas (1937)
- Sky Racket (1937)
- Nation Aflame (1937)
- Texas Trail (1937)
- Outlaws of the Prairie (1937)
- Roaring Six Guns (1937)
- The Purple Vigilantes (1938)
- The Old Barn Dance (1938)
- Barefoot Boy (1938)
- Call the Mesquiteers (1938)
- Lawless Valley (1938)
- The Rangers' Round-Up (1938)
- Long Shot (1939)
- Law and Order (1940)
- The Range Busters (1940)
- The Sagebrush Family Trails West (1940)
- Under Texas Skies (1940)
- Scattergood Baines (1941)
- Red River Robin Hood (1942)
- The Bashful Bachelor (1942)
- Inside the Law (1942)
- Hoppy Serves a Writ (1943)
- The San Antonio Kid (1944)
- The Utah Kid (1944)
- Mystery of the River Boat (1944)
- Oregon Trail (1945)
- Gun Smoke (1945)
- Unexpected Guest (1947)
- Oregon Trail Scouts (1947)
- Vigilantes of Boomtown (1947)
- Borrowed Trouble (1948)
- Oklahoma Badlands (1948)
- Henry, the Rainmaker (1949)
- Jiggs and Maggie in Jackpot Jitters (1949)
- Up in Smoke (1957)
- Saintly Sinners (1962) (Last credited film role)

=== Selected television ===
1958	"Have Gun-Will Travel"	Leadhead Kane	S1 E33 "The Silver Queen"
1951	Front Page Detective		Season 1, Episode 20, "Recipe for Murder" (First credited television role)
1952	Sky King	Worthless Jones	Season 1, Episode 10, "The Man Who Forgot"
1953	Death Valley Days	Micah Bisbee	Season 2, Episode 4, "Which Side of the Fence"
1954	Hopalong Cassidy	Picture Pete	Season 2, Episode 15, "Copper Hills"
1955	The Lone Ranger	Barnaby Boggs	Season 4, Episode 40, "The Swami"
1956	The Cisco Kid	Orlando the Magician	Season 6, Episode 25, "Magician of Jamesville"
1957	Gunsmoke	Title Role	Season 2, Episode 35, "Uncle Oliver"
1957	Maverick	Johnson	Season 1, Episode 7, "Relic of Fort Tejon"
1958	Decision	Undertaker	Season 1, Episode 4, "The Tall Man"
1958	Colgate Theatre		Season 1, Episode 2, "The Last Marshal"
1958	The Adventures of Wild Bill Hickok	Tobias Riddle	Season 8, Episode 13, "Counterfeit Ghost"
1959	The Rifleman	Auctioneer	Season 1, Episode 33, "The Money Gun"
1959	Tales of Wells Fargo	Pop Shannon	Season 3, Episode 22, "Lola Montez"
1959	Have Gun - Will Travel	Colonel Jeremiah Pike	Season 2, Episode 20, "Juliet"
1960	Death Valley Days	Deacon	Season 8, Episode 35, "Pete Kitchen's Wedding Night"
1961	Gunsmoke	Tubby	Season 7, Episode 8, "Chesterland"
1961	Bus Stop	Chet	Season 1, Episode 1, "Afternoon of a Cowboy"
1962	Gunsmoke	Dobie	Season 8, Episode 3, "Quint Asper Comes Home"
1962	Mister Ed	Side Show Barker	Season 2, Episode 19, "Ed's Word of Honor"
1962	The Twilight Zone	Agee	Season 3, Episode 21, "Kick the Can"
1962	The Donna Reed Show	Mr. Coxley	Season 4, Episode 29, "Explorer's Ten"
1963	Gunsmoke	Judge	Season 8, Episode 27, "Two of a Kind" (Last credited television role)
