= Lay That Rifle Down =

1955 film by Charles Lamont

- Directed by: Charles Lamont
- Written by: Barry Shipman
- Produced by: Sidney Picker
- Starring: Judy Canova
- Cinematography: John L. Russell
- Edited by: Arthur Roberts
- Music by: R. Dale Butts
- Production company: Republic Pictures
- Distributed by: Republic Pictures
- Release date: July 7, 1955 (United States)
- Running time: 71 minutes
- Country: United States
- Language: English
- Budget: $242,780
- Box office: 200,102

Lay That Rifle Down is a 1955 American comedy film directed by Charles Lamont starring Judy Canova. It was the thirteenth and last in a series of Judy Canova films released by Republic Pictures.

== Plot ==
Judy Canova works in a hotel for her domineering aunt. Her unscrupulous relatives try to blackmail and dupe her into selling her apparently worthless farm, having been led to believe that it has enormous potential value by a couple of confidence tricksters.

== Cast ==
- Judy Canova as Judy Canova
- Robert Lowery as Nick Stokes, aka Poindexter March III
- Jil Jarmyn as Betty Greeb
- Jacqueline deWit as Aunt Sarah Greeb
- Richard Deacon as Glover Speckleton
- Robert Burton as General Ballard
- James Bell as Mr. Fetcher
- Leon Tyler as Horace Speckleton
- Tweeny Canova as Tweeny Greeb

== Songs ==
Judy sings three songs in this movie:

- I'm Glad I Was Born on My Birthday (silly)
- The Continental Correspondence Charm School (silly)
- Sleepy Serenade (a very soothing lullaby)

== Reception ==
After distribution, advertising and prints the film recorded a loss of $151,138.

== See also ==
- List of American films of 1955

== Bibliography ==
- Hurst, Richard M. Republic Studios: Beyond Poverty Row and the Majors. Scarecrow Press, 2007.
