= The Blow Out =

1936 film by Fred Avery

- Title card
- Directed by: Fred Avery
- Produced by: Leon Schlesinger
- Starring: Joe Dougherty; Martha Wentworth; Tex Avery; Joe Twerp; Bernice Hansen
- Music by: Bernard Brown
- Animation by: Charles Jones; Sid Sutherland
- Color process: Black-and-white
- Production company: Leon Schlesinger Productions
- Distributed by: Warner Bros. Productions; The Vitaphone Corporation
- Release date: April 4, 1936
- Running time: 7 min
- Country: United States
- Language: English

The Blow Out is a 1936 American animated comedy short film directed by Fred Avery. The short was released on April 4, 1936. It is the 68th film in the Looney Tunes series and the fifth cartoon to star Porky Pig in his first solo appearance.

== Plot ==
A hooded terrorist leaves behind an alarm clock that explodes at the base of a building and destroys it. Nicknamed the "Mad Bomber" by the media, the police searches the city and offers a $2000 bounty to whoever is able to capture him. The Mad Bomber hides in a building and makes his next explosive by simply stuffing dynamite, a black bomb, skyrockets, and firecrackers into an alarm clock. He selects his next target on a map and leaves with his cloak and hat.

Elsewhere, Porky Pig stands outside an ice cream parlor, clamoring an ice cream soda that costs 10 pennies. Unfortunately, he only has 5 pennies, so he dejectedly sits on the curb until he unknowingly helps a stranger pick up his cane, who gives him one penny as thanks. Realizing this opportunity, he repeats it twice and receives two pennies. He then finds a 5 pence coin, but it is stolen by a dog.

Porky happens to be near the Mad Bomber's target building and sees his bomb, believing it to be a lost item and attempts to return it, much to the Mad Bomber's horror. The Mad Bomber attempts to hide in multiple locations, but Porky appears out of thin air Droopy-style to return it. He hides in the sewers and is met with Porky again. He leaves while Porky is on his tail, only to be spotted by two police officers, who chase him into his hideout. He locks four doors and barricades it to prevent the police from entering, only for Porky to appear again, causing him to rush into the police car; Porky returns the bomb as it explodes in the police car. He is awarded $2000 to his surprise, which he futilely attempts to place in his pocket. When asked by a reporter what he will spend it on, it is shown that he used a small fraction of the money to buy a great amount of ice cream sodas, which he enjoys as the film ends.

== Home media ==
The Blow Out is available on disc 1 of the Porky Pig 101 DVD set.

== Legacy ==
Thomas Pynchon refers to the cartoon involving "Porky Pig and the anarchist" several times in his novels The Crying of Lot 49 and Gravity's Rainbow.

== See also ==
- Porky Pig filmography
- Looney Tunes and Merrie Melodies filmography (1930–1939)
