= Vigilantes of Boomtown =

1947 film by R. G. Springsteen

- Theatrical release poster
- Directed by: R. G. Springsteen
- Screenplay by: Earle Snell
- Produced by: Sidney Picker
- Starring: Allan Lane; Robert Blake; Martha Wentworth; Roscoe Karns; Roy Barcroft; Peggy Stewart
- Cinematography: Alfred S. Keller
- Edited by: William P. Thompson
- Music by: Mort Glickman
- Production company: Republic Pictures
- Distributed by: Republic Pictures
- Release date: February 15, 1947
- Running time: 56 minutes
- Country: United States
- Language: English

Vigilantes of Boomtown is a 1947 American Western film in the Red Ryder film series directed by R. G. Springsteen, written by Earle Snell, and starring Allan Lane, Robert Blake, Martha Wentworth, Roscoe Karns, Roy Barcroft and Peggy Stewart. It was released on February 15, 1947, by Republic Pictures.

== Cast ==
- Allan Lane as Red Ryder
- Robert Blake as Little Beaver
- Martha Wentworth as Duchess Wentworth
- Roscoe Karns as Billy Delaney
- Roy Barcroft as McKean
- Peggy Stewart as Molly McVey
- George Tume as Jim Corbett
- Eddie Lou Simms as Eddie
- George Chesebro as Dink
- Bobby Barber as Corbett's Second
- George Lloyd as Thug Hired by Molly
- Ted Adams as Sheriff
- John Dehner as Bob Fitzsimmons
- Earle Hodgins as Governor
