= Jack Kirk =

American film actor

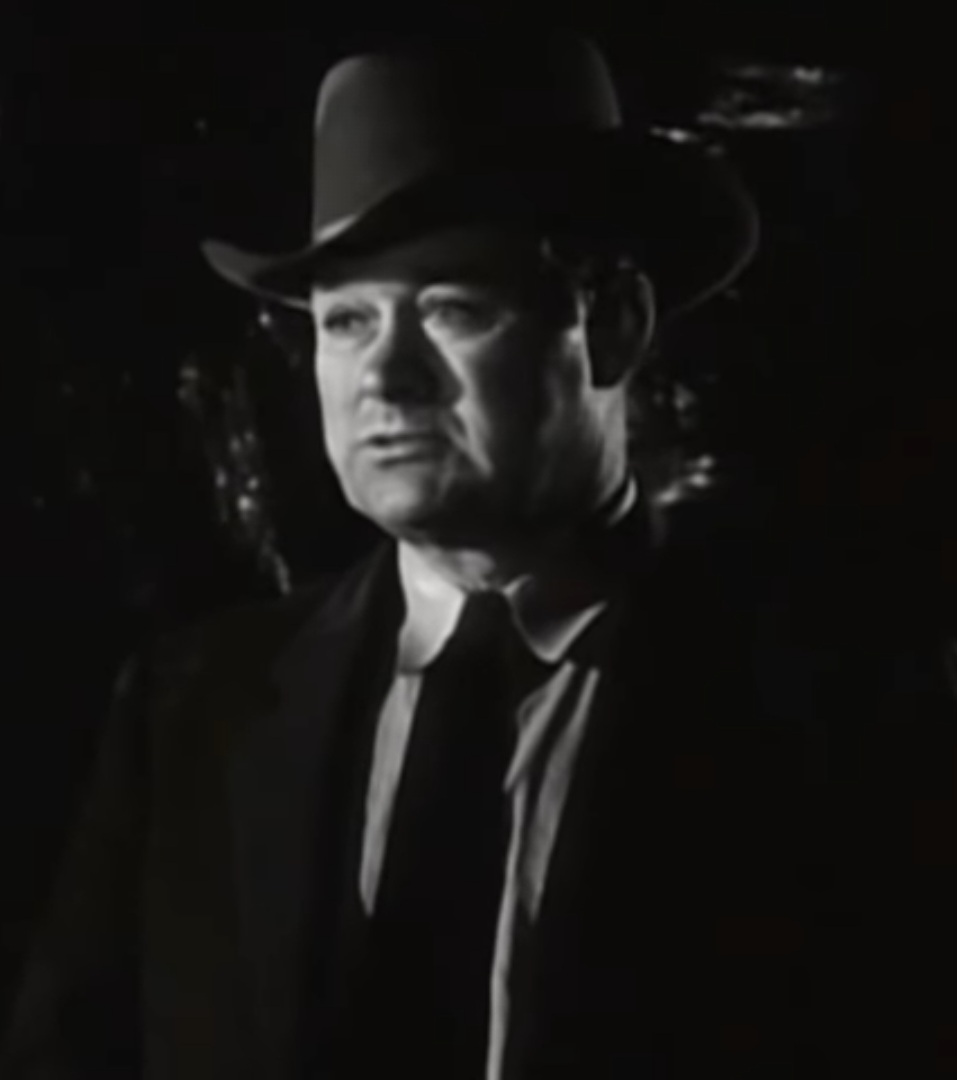
- Kirk in Cowboy and the Senorita (1944)
- Born: February 19, 1895; Missoula, Montana, U.S.
- Died: September 13, 1948 (aged 53); Ketchikan, Alaska, U.S
- Resting place: Valhalla Memorial Park Cemetery
- Occupation: Film actor
- Years active: 1926–1954

Jack Kirk (February 19, 1895 – September 13, 1948) was an American film actor from Missoula, Montana who had roles in over 300 films, mostly B-westerns, from 1926 and 1954.

He is interred in Valhalla Memorial Park Cemetery in Los Angeles, California.

== Selected filmography ==
- The Stolen Ranch (1926)
- Dames Ahoy! (1930)
- The Lone Rider (1930)
- Law of the Rio Grande (1931)
- Border Law (1931)
- Riders of the Rio (1931)
- The Fighting Fool (1932)
- Texas Cyclone (1932)
- The Saddle Buster (1932)
- Mark of the Spur (1932)
- Ghost Valley (1932)
- The Western Code (1932)
- Unknown Valley (1933)
- Fighting Through (1934)
- Outlaw Rule (1935)
- The Man from Guntown (1935)
- The Rider of the Law (1935)
- Lawless Range (1935)
- Comin' Round the Mountain (1936)
- California Mail (1936)
- Guns of the Pecos (1937)
- State Police (1938)
- Outlaw Express (1938)
- Rhythm of the Saddle (1938)
- Gold Mine in the Sky (1938)
- The Night Riders (1939)
- Lone Star Raiders (1940)
- The Trail Blazers (1940)
- The Tulsa Kid (1940)
- Bad Man of Deadwood (1941)
- Man from Cheyenne (1942)
- Westward Ho (1942)
- Sheriff of Sundown (1944)
- Cheyenne Wildcat (1944)
- Corpus Christi Bandits (1945)
- The Topeka Terror (1945)
- Conquest of Cheyenne (1946)
- Gunning for Vengeance (1946)
- Terrors on Horseback (1946)
- Oregon Trail Scouts (1947)
- The Bold Frontiersman (1948)
- Oklahoma Badlands (1948)
