= Trevor Bardette =

American actor (1902–1977)

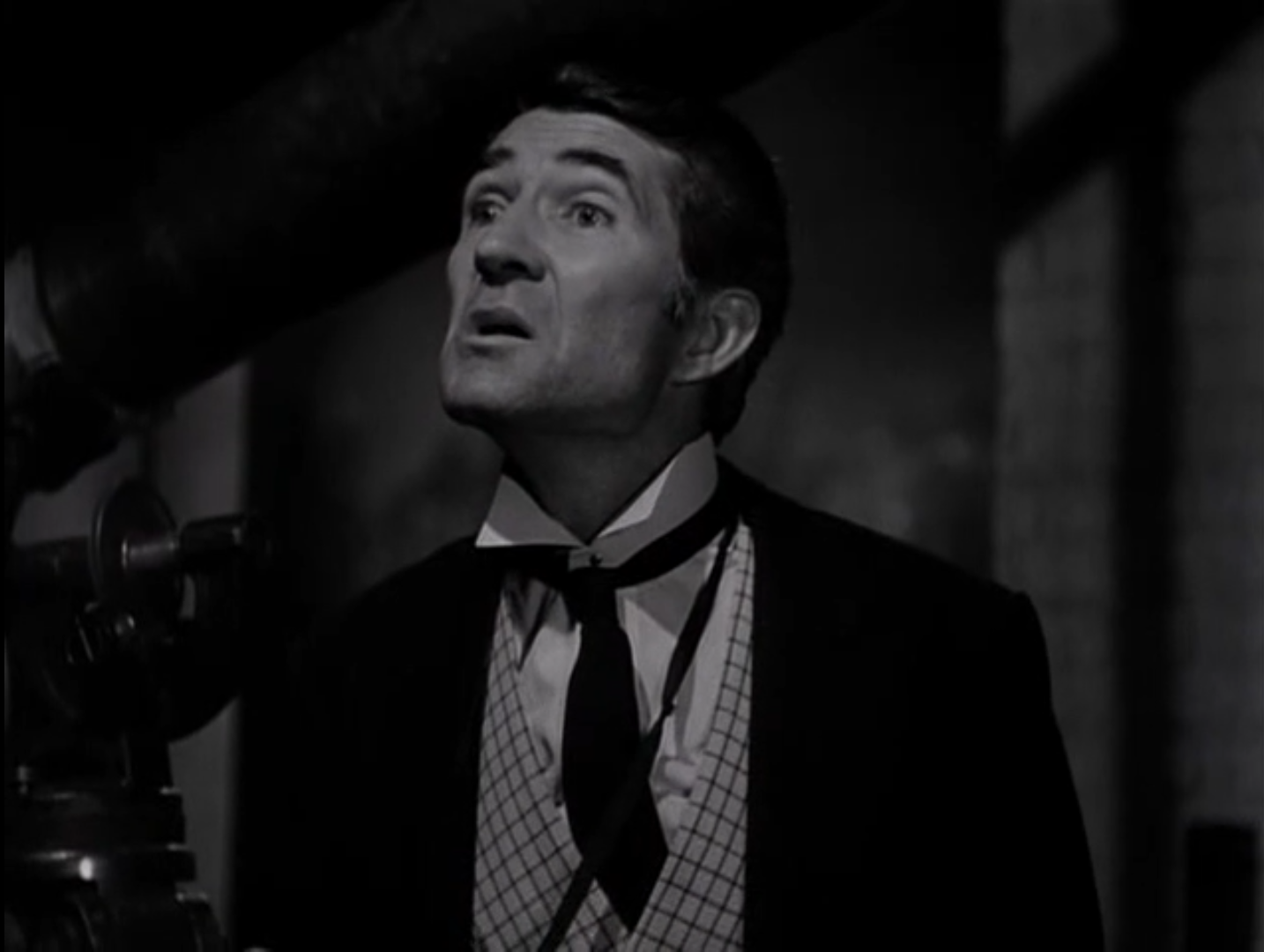
- Bardette in Dick Tracy (1945)
- Born: Terva Gaston Hubbard; November 19, 1902; Nashville, Arkansas, U.S.
- Died: November 28, 1977 (aged 75)
- Education: Oregon State University; Northwestern University
- Occupation: Actor
- Years active: 1937–1970
- Spouse: Dorothy Virginia Chandler (m. 1927)

Trevor Bardette (born Terva Gaston Hubbard; November 19, 1902 – November 28, 1977) was an American film and television actor. Among many other roles in his long and prolific career, Bardette appeared in several episodes of Adventures of Superman and as Newman Haynes Clanton, or Old Man Clanton, in 21 episodes of the ABC/Desilu western series, The Life and Legend of Wyatt Earp.

== Early years ==
Bardette was born in Nashville, Arkansas. He acted with the dramatic club at Oregon State University, where he graduated in 1925 with a degree in mechanical engineering. He then earned a master of science degree at Northwestern University.

== Career ==
Bardette began working in film in 1936, after leaving a planned mechanical engineering career. His first role was in the 1937 movie Borderland, a Hopalong Cassidy "Old West" feature. He appeared in an uncredited role as Art Huck in The Big Sleep (1946).

He made over 172 movies and 72 television appearances in his career, and was seen as a rustler, gangster, wartime collaborator. On The Adventures of Superman, he played the sinister title character in the 1951 show “The Human Bomb”. In its 1954 episode "Great Caesar's Ghost", he was a member of a criminal gang trying to drive editor Perry White insane by making him think the subject of his oft-heard epithet had materialized. He played "Wally", the proprietor of Wally's Filling Station, in the "Gomer the House Guest" episode of The Andy Griffith Show.

Bardette was cast in various roles in four episodes of the anthology series The Ford Television Theatre between 1953 and 1956. He guest-starred six times each on the original CBS family drama, Lassie, and in Clint Walker's ABC/Warner Brothers western series, Cheyenne. Bardette appeared three times on John Payne's western series, The Restless Gun as well as Wagon Train, and Have Gun – Will Travel. Twice he appeared on Tales of Wells Fargo, Broken Arrow, Gunsmoke, Maverick, Laramie and Trackdown.

Bardette played Captain Warner in the 1962 episode "A Matter of Honor" on the syndicated western anthology series, Death Valley Days. In that episode, Vic Morrow played Lt. Robert Benson. In Oct 1962 he played Jessie Johnson on an episode of Bonanza, "The Way Station", as the grandfather of a lovestruck young woman whose love interest holds a stage hostage until a posse arrives. In 1965, he played Stanley Conklin in the episode "The Unborn" of the CBS drama Slattery's People, starring Richard Crenna as a state legislator.

From 1959 to 1961, he was cast as the unscrupulous Old Man Clanton on The Life and Legend of Wyatt Earp, with Hugh O'Brian in the title role of Wyatt Earp. His last appearance was in "The Requiem for Old Man Clanton" on May 30, 1961. Bardette appeared as well in different roles in five earlier Wyatt Earp episodes between 1956 and 1958.

Bardette made two guest appearances on CBS's Perry Mason. In 1959, he played murder victim John Brant in "The Case of the Startled Stallion," and in 1963 he played murderer Garrett Richards in "The Case of the Two-Faced Turn-a-Bout," with Hugh O'Brian in the role of guest attorney Bruce Jason.

Bardette made his final television appearance in the 1968 episode "Goodbye, Dolly" of the CBS sitcom Gomer Pyle - U.S.M.C., starring Jim Nabors. His final film appearance was the next year in Mackenna's Gold.

== Selected filmography ==
- The Cabin in the Cotton (1932) - Bit Part (uncredited)
- Borderland (1937) - Col. Gonzales
- They Won't Forget (1937) - Shattuck Clay
- White Bondage (1937) - Lon Huston (uncredited)
- The Great Garrick (1937) - M. Noverre
- Jezebel (1938) - Sheriff at Plantation (uncredited)
- Topa Topa (1938) - Joe Morton
- Mystery House (1938) - Bruker
- Marie Antoinette (1938) - Municipal Taking the Young Dauphin (uncredited)
- Valley of the Giants (1938) - Complaining Landowner (uncredited)
- In Old Mexico (1938) - Colonel Gonzalez
- Smashing the Spy Ring (1938) - Jordan (uncredited)
- Stand Up and Fight (1939) - Mob Leader (uncredited)
- Let Freedom Ring (1939) - Gagan
- The Oklahoma Kid (1939) - Indian Jack Pasco
- Overland with Kit Carson (1939) - Mitchell - Trapper
- The Cowboy Quarterback (1939) - The Indian (uncredited)
- Charlie Chan at Treasure Island (1939) - Abdul
- Blackmail (1939) - Southern Deputy (uncredited)
- Gone with the Wind (1939) - Minor Role (uncredited)
- Abe Lincoln in Illinois (1940) - John Hanks
- The Grapes of Wrath (1940) - Jule - Bouncer at Dance (uncredited)
- The Fighting 69th (1940) - First Alabama Man (uncredited)
- Virginia City (1940) - Union Fanatic with Knife (uncredited)
- Dark Command (1940) - Mr. Hale
- Young Buffalo Bill (1940) - Emelio Montez
- Ski Patrol (1940) - Russian Tunnel Team Commander
- Torrid Zone (1940) - Policeman Escorting Lee on Ship (uncredited)
- Island of Doomed Men' (1940) - District Attorney (uncredited)
- Wagons Westward (1940) - Alan Cook
- New Moon (1940) - Foulette (uncredited)
- Winners of the West (1940, Serial) - Raven
- Three Faces West (1940) - Clem Higgins
- He Stayed for Breakfast (1940) - Police Lieutenant
- The Westerner (1940) - Shad Wilkins
- Girl from Havana (1940) - Drenov, the Russian
- Murder Over New York (1940) - Hindu Businessman (uncredited)
- Santa Fe Trail (1940) - Agitator in Palmyra (uncredited)
- Romance of the Rio Grande (1940) - Henchman Manuel
- Doomed Caravan (1941) - Ed Martin
- Topper Returns (1941) - Rama - the Butler
- The Cowboy and the Blonde (1941) - Wanee, Indian Cook (uncredited)
- Jungle Girl (1941, Serial) - Dr. John Meredith / Bradley Meredith
- Bad Men of Missouri (1941) - Bandaged Soldier (uncredited)
- Highway West (1941) - Husband (uncredited)
- Mystery Ship (1941) - Ernst Madek
- Buy Me That Town (1941) - George
- International Lady (1941) - Krell, the Chemist (uncredited)
- Glamour Boy (1941) - Sheriff
- Red River Valley (1941) - Allison
- Wild Bill Hickok Rides (1942) - Sam Bass
- Henry and Dizzy (1942) - Mr. Weeks
- Flight Lieutenant (1942) - Carey (uncredited)
- The Secret Code (1942, Serial) - Jensen
- Apache Trail (1942) - Amber
- Chetniks! The Fighting Guerrillas (1943) - Peasant Leader (uncredited)
- The Moon Is Down (1943) - Knute Pierson - Foreman (uncredited)
- This Land Is Mine (1943) - Courtroom Guard Who Brings Albert's Notes (uncredited)
- The Chance of a Lifetime (1943) - Manny Vogel (uncredited)
- Deerslayer (1943) - Chief Rivanoak
- None Shall Escape (1944) - Jan Stys as a Man
- The Whistler (1944) - The Bum in the Next Bed (uncredited)
- Tampico (1944) - Charlie - Mexican Waiter (uncredited)
- The Black Parachute (1944) - Nicholas - Guerilla (uncredited)
- U-Boat Prisoner (1944) - Convoy Ship Commander (uncredited)
- The Conspirators (1944) - Stefan (uncredited)
- The Missing Juror (1944) - Tom Pierson (uncredited)
- Faces in the Fog (1944) - Garner, Juror (uncredited)
- Counter-Attack (1945) - Petrov (uncredited)
- Escape in the Desert (1945) - Steve, Citizen Gunman (uncredited)
- A Thousand and One Nights (1945) - Hasson (uncredited)
- Dick Tracy (1945) - Prof. Linwood J. Starling
- God's Country (1946) - White Cloud
- The Hoodlum Saint (1946) - Rabbi Meyerberg
- Dragonwyck (1946) - Farmer (uncredited)
- The Man Who Dared (1946) - Police Sgt. Arthur Landis
- Sing While You Dance (1946) - Dusty
- The Big Sleep (1946) - Art Huck (uncredited)
- Dick Tracy vs. Cueball (1946) - Lester Abbott (uncredited)
- 13 Rue Madeleine (1946) - Resistance Fighter (uncredited)
- The Beginning or the End (1947) - Clinic Doctor
- Ramrod (1947) - Bailey - Circle 66 Hand (uncredited)
- The Sea of Grass (1947) - Andy Boggs
- The Millerson Case (1947) - Ward Beechy (uncredited)
- Slave Girl (1947) - Hadji, the Cafe Proprietor
- Wyoming (1947) - Timmons
- Marshal of Cripple Creek (1947) - Tom Lambert
- Unconquered (1947) - Villager Beside Garth at Ft. Pitt Siege (uncredited)
- The Last Round-Up (1947) - Indian Chief (uncredited)
- T-Men (1947) - Rudy (uncredited)
- Tycoon (1947) - Julio Ayora - House Guest (uncredited)
- Alias a Gentleman (1948) - Jig Johnson
- The Wreck of the Hesperus (1948) - William Bliss
- Panhandle (1948) - Barber Customer (uncredited)
- The Mating of Millie (1948) - Mr. Wilson (uncredited)
- The Return of the Whistler (1948) - Arnold (uncredited)
- Adventures in Silverado (1948) - Mike
- Silver River (1948) - Soldier (uncredited)
- The Gallant Legion (1948) - Half-Breed Interpreter (uncredited)
- Secret Service Investigator (1948) - Henry Witzel
- Sword of the Avenger (1948) - Miguel
- Marshal of Amarillo (1948) - Frank Welch
- The Loves of Carmen (1948) - Lucas' Footman (uncredited)
- Behind Locked Doors (1948) - Mr. Purvis - a Patient (uncredited)
- Black Eagle (1948) - Mike Long
- Sundown in Santa Fe (1948) - John Stuart
- Hills of Home (1948) - Saunders (uncredited)
- Smoky Mountain Melody (1948) - Uncle McCorkle
- The Paleface (1948) - Governor's Horseman (uncredited)
- Sheriff of Wichita (1949) - Captain Ira Flanders
- Song of India (1949) - Rewa
- Big Jack (1949) - John Oakes (uncredited)
- The Doolins of Oklahoma (1949) - Ezra Johnson - Farmer (uncredited)
- Hellfire (1949) - Wilson
- The Blazing Trail (1949) - Jess Williams
- Omoo-Omoo, the Shark God (1949) - Capt. Roger Guy
- Lust for Gold (1949) - Man in Saloon (uncredited)
- The Wyoming Bandit (1949) - Wyoming Dan
- San Antone Ambush (1949) - Wade Shattuck
- Apache Chief (1949) - Chief Big Crow
- Bagdad (1949) - Soldier (uncredited)
- Renegades of the Sage (1949) - Miller
- Gun Crazy (1950) - Sheriff Boston
- The Palomino (1950) - Bill Brown (uncredited)
- Cargo to Capetown (1950) - Captain Olferi (uncredited)
- Fortunes of Captain Blood (1950) - Head Prison Guard (uncredited)
- Hills of Oklahoma (1950) - Hank Peters
- Tarzan and the Slave Girl (1950) - Man Building Tomb (uncredited)
- Broken Arrow (1950) - Stage Passenger (uncredited)
- A Lady Without Passport (1950) - Lt. Carfagno, Cuban Cop
- Union Station (1950) - Patrolman (uncredited)
- Copper Canyon (1950) - Southerner Ore Wagon Driver (uncredited)
- Gene Autry and the Mounties (1951) - Raoul Duval
- The Sword of Monte Cristo (1951) - Navarre
- Fort Savage Raiders (1951) - Old Cuss
- Lorna Doone (1951) - Jan Fry (uncredited)
- The Texas Rangers (1951) - 1st Telegraph Operator (uncredited)
- Mask of the Avenger (1951) - Farmer (uncredited)
- Fort Dodge Stampede (1951) - Sparkler McCann
- Honeychile (1951) - Crooked Rancher (uncredited)
- The Barefoot Mailman (1951) - Oat McCarty
- Flight to Mars (1951) - Alzar (uncredited)
- Lone Star (1952) - Sid Yoakum
- Macao (1952) - Alvaris (uncredited)
- The San Francisco Story (1952) - Miner (uncredited)
- Montana Territory (1952) - Lloyd Magruder (uncredited)
- The Studebaker Story (1953) (uncredited)
- The Man Behind the Gun (1953) - Sheldon's Henchman at Hideout (uncredited)
- The Sun Shines Bright (1953) - Rufe Ramseur
- A Perilous Journey (1953) - Whiskered Miner (uncredited)
- Ambush at Tomahawk Gap (1953) - Twin Forks Sheriff
- The Desert Song (1953) - Neri
- The Man from the Alamo (1953) - Davy Crockett (uncredited)
- Bandits of the West (1953) - Jeff Chadwick
- Thunder Over the Plains (1953) - Walter Morgan (uncredited)
- Red River Shore (1953) - Frank Barlow
- Dangerous Mission (1954) - Kicking Bear Indian Chief at Schoolhouse (uncredited)
- Johnny Guitar (1954) - Jenks (uncredited)
- The Outlaw Stallion (1954) - Rigo
- Destry (1954) - Sheriff Joseph Bailey
- Rage at Dawn (1955) - Fisher
- The Man from Bitter Ridge (1955) - Walter Dunham
- Run for Cover (1955) - Paulsen
- The Man from Bitter Ridge (1955) - Sam Baldwin
- The Rawhide Years (1956) - Captain
- The Rack (1956) - Court President
- Dragoon Wells Massacre (1957) - Marshal Bill Haney
- Shoot-Out at Medicine Bend (1957) - Sheriff Bob Massey
- Man in the Shadow (1957) - Bystander in Opening Scene (uncredited)
- The Monolith Monsters (1957) - Prof. Arthur Flanders
- The Hard Man (1957) - Mitch Willis
- The Restless Gun (1957) - The Marshall in Episode "The Child"
- The Restless Gun (1958) - Enoch Wilson in Episode "Hiram Grover's Strike"
- Colgate Theatre (1958) - Episode "The Last Marshal"
- The Restless Gun (1958) - Episode "Peligroso"
- Thunder Road (1958) - Vernon Doolin
- The Saga of Hemp Brown (1958) - Judge Rawlins
- The Mating Game (1959) - Chief Guthrie
- The Joey Bishop Show (1962, TV Series) - Clem Ames
- Papa's Delicate Condition (1963) - Stanley Henderson II
- The Raiders (1963) - 'Uncle Otto' Strassner
- Mackenna's Gold (1969) - Judge Bergerman (uncredited)
