= John Alvin (actor) =

American actor (1917–2009)

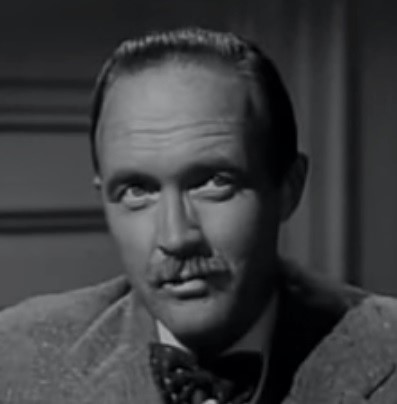
- Alvin in Alcoa Presents One Step Beyond, 1960
- Born: John Alvin Hoffstadt; October 24, 1917; Chicago, Illinois, U.S.
- Died: February 27, 2009 (aged 91); Thousand Oaks, California, U.S.
- Occupation: Actor
- Years active: 1943–1994
- Spouse: June Lewis (m. 1947)

John Alvin (born John Alvin Hoffstadt; October 24, 1917 – February 27, 2009) was an American film, stage and television actor. He appeared in over 25 films for Warner Brothers and numerous television and theater roles throughout his career, which spanned from the 1940s to the 1990s.

== Early life ==
Alvin was born in Chicago on October 24, 1917. His father was a surgeon while his mother was a professional opera singer. He had one brother.

Alvin began to pursue acting while in high school. He moved from Illinois to California in 1939 in order to study at the Pasadena Playhouse. He met his future wife, June Lewis, while studying at the playhouse. They married in 1947 and remained together until his death in 2009.

Alvin dropped his last name, Hoffstadt, following the outbreak of World War II. He remained known as John Alvin both professionally and personally for the remainder of his life.

== Career ==
Alvin was signed with Warner Brothers Studios for an exclusive four-year contract during the World War II era, although he was "borrowed" by 20th Century Fox to appear in 1944's Oscar-nominated The Fighting Sullivans. He played Sid in The Lone Ranger (TV series) episode (1/14) "The Masked Rider" (1949). He appeared in more than 25 Warner Brothers films during this time, including Northern Pursuit (which starred Errol Flynn), The Beast with Five Fingers, The Very Thought of You, and Objective, Burma!. His pictures after the contract period included Irma la Douce, Inside Daisy Clover, They Shoot Horses, Don't They?, and Alfred Hitchcock's Marnie (1964). However, it was his role in the 1943 film Destination Tokyo, in which he co-starred with John Garfield and Cary Grant, that left the largest impression on Alvin. Years later, in a 2006 interview, Alvin credited Grant with having a major impact on his career path: "I learned more about show business from him than from anyone. He was very attentive and helpful."

Alvin later enjoyed a separate television career, which spanned from the 1950s to the 1980s. His television credits included various roles on Leave It to Beaver, The Cara Williams Show, All in the Family, Lou Grant, Dragnet, General Hospital, Murder, She Wrote, Starsky and Hutch, The Incredible Hulk and I Spy. Alvin's also appeared in numerous television commercials advertising for such products as Mattel, H&R Block, McDonald's, Porsche and Audi.

Alvin's theater repertoire included Send Me No Flowers, The Student Prince, The Chicago Conspiracy Trial and The Cradle Will Rock. He also appeared in a production of Rain, which was directed by Charlie Chaplin.

He largely retired from acting in the 1990s; his final film appearance was in 1994's Milk Money. During his retirement, Alvin often showed his movies for audiences at the Conejo Valley Senior Concerns, an organization for senior citizens based in Thousand Oaks, California.

== Death ==
John Alvin suffered injuries in a fall in February 2009. He died of complications from his injuries a week after the accident at a nursing home in Thousand Oaks, California, on February 27, 2009, at the age of 91. His ashes were scattered into the Pacific Ocean. Alvin was a 20-year resident of Thousand Oaks at the time of his death.

Alvin was survived by his wife, June, who had been married to him for 61 years. He was also survived by his son, Craig; daughter, Kim Ford; four grandchildren and three great-grandchildren. His son, Tracy, died of a drug overdose in 1969 when he was 21 years old.

== Selected filmography ==
- Northern Pursuit (1943) .... Orderly (uncredited)
- Destination Tokyo (1943) .... Sound Man
- The Fighting Sullivans (1944) .... Madison Abel 'Matt' Sullivan
- Janie (1944) .... Life Photographer (uncredited)
- The Very Thought of You (1944) .... Cal Wheeler
- Objective, Burma (1945) .... Hogan
- Roughly Speaking (1945) .... Lawton MacKall (uncredited)
- The Horn Blows at Midnight (1945) .... Angel (scenes deleted)
- San Antonio (1945) .... Pony Smith
- Three Strangers (1946) .... Junior Clerk
- One More Tomorrow (1946) .... Announcer (uncredited)
- Night and Day (1946) .... Petey (uncredited)
- Shadow of a Woman (1946) .... Carl
- The Beast with Five Fingers (1946) .... Donald Arlington
- Nora Prentiss (1947) .... SF Bay Ferry Boat Dispatcher (voice, uncredited)
- Stallion Road (1947) .... Radio Broadcaster (uncredited)
- Love and Learn (1947) .... William – the Wyngate Chauffeur
- Cheyenne (1947) .... Single Jack
- Deep Valley (1947) .... Convict (uncredited)
- Dark Passage (1947) .... Blackie (scenes deleted)
- Under Colorado Skies (1947) .... Jeff Collins
- Rocky (1948) .... Jack Arnold
- Open Secret (1948) .... Ralph
- The Bold Frontiersman (1948) ..... Don Post
- Romance on the High Seas (1948) – Charles – Travel Agent (uncredited)
- Train to Alcatraz (1948) .... Nick
- Shanghai Chest (1948) .... Victor Armstrong
- The Babe Ruth Story (1948) .... Reporter (uncredited)
- Two Guys from Texas (1948) .... Jim Crocker
- A Kiss in the Dark (1949) .... Tenant (uncredited)
- The Fountainhead (1949) .... Young Intellectual (uncredited)
- The Story of Seabiscuit (1949) .... Announcer (uncredited)
- Bright Leaf (1950) .... Poker Player (uncredited)
- This Side of the Law (1950) .... Calder Taylor
- Lonely Heart Bandits (1950) .... Trooper (uncredited)
- Pretty Baby (1950) – Danny (uncredited)
- The Breaking Point (1950) .... Reporter (uncredited)
- Dial 1119 (1950) .... Television Director (uncredited)
- Highway 301 (1950) .... Bank Teller (uncredited)
- Missing Women (1951) .... Eddie Ennis
- Three Guys Named Mike (1951) .... Flight Dispatcher Brown (uncredited)
- Home Town Story (1951) .... Jimmy (uncredited)
- Goodbye, My Fancy (1951) .... Jack White (scenes deleted)
- Havana Rose (1951) .... Reporter (uncredited)
- Come Fill the Cup (1951) .... Travis Ashbourne – Reporter
- Close to My Heart (1951) .... Prospective Adoptive Father (uncredited)
- The Unknown Man (1951) .... Photographer (uncredited)
- Washington Story (1952) .... Technician (uncredited)
- Carrie (1952) .... Stage Manager
- The Iron Mistress (1952) .... Impatient Man in Tailor's Shop (uncredited)
- Torpedo Alley (1952) .... Professor
- April in Paris (1952) .... Tracy
- Dream Wife (1953) .... Reporter (uncredited)
- Lucky Me (1954) .... Clerk (uncredited)
- The Shanghai Story (1954) .... Mr. Warren
- Naked Alibi (1954) .... Stu (uncredited)
- Deep in My Heart (1954) .... Mr. Mulvaney (uncredited)
- A Bullet for Joey (1955) .... Constable Dan Percy (uncredited)
- Kentucky Rifle (1955) .... Luke Thomas
- City of Shadows (1955) .... Security Guard at 20th Century Security Company (uncredited)
- The McConnell Story (1955) .... Johnny – Flyer Escort (uncredited)
- Illegal (1955) .... Court Clerk (uncredited)
- The Couch (1962) .... Sloan
- Irma la Douce (1963) .... Customer #2
- Marnie (1964) .... Hotel Chauffeur (uncredited)
- The Legend of Lylah Clare (1968) .... Accountant (uncredited)
- They Call Me Mister Tibbs! (1970) .... Bearded Reporter at Logan Sharpe HQ (uncredited)
- The Organization (1971) .... Forensic Officer (uncredited)
- Somewhere in Time (1980) .... Arthur's Father
- Milk Money (1994) .... Rich Old Guy (final film role)
