= Arthur Roberts (film editor) =

American film editor (1890–1961)

- Born: July 17, 1890; Texas, United States
- Died: February 5, 1961 (aged 70); San Mateo, California, United States
- Occupation: Film editor
- Years active: 1927–1955

Arthur Roberts (July 17, 1890 – February 5, 1961), also known as Arthur E. Roberts, was an American film editor who edited over 100 films during his almost 30-year career.

== Life and career ==
Arthur Roberts began editing towards the end of the silent era of the film industry, his first film being 1927's The College Hero, directed by Walter Lang. His last film was Republic's Lay That Rifle Down in 1955, after which he spent a brief period as the editor for the television series, Lassie, before retiring in 1956. During his career he would work with many famous directors, including Frank Capra (on several films, including The Donovan Affair), Lowell Sherman (on The Royal Bed), William Seiter (on several films, including Way Back Home), Edward F. Cline (on Cracked Nuts), George Cukor (on A Bill of Divorcement), Dorothy Arzner (the first female member of the DGA, on Christopher Strong), Anthony Mann (Strangers in the Night), George Archainbaud (Girls of the Big House), Fritz Lang (House by the River),

== Filmography ==
(Per AFI database)

- The College Hero (1927)
- The Siren (1927)
- After the Storm (1928)
- Broadway Daddies (1928)
- Court-Martial (1928)
- The Desert Bride (1928)
- Fashion Madness (1928)
- Lady Raffles (1928)
- The Matinee Idol (1928)
- The Power of the Press (1928)
- Say It with Sables (1928)
- So This Is Love? (1928)
- The Sporting Age (1928)
- Stool Pigeon (1928)
- Submarine (1928)
- That Certain Thing (1928)
- The Wife's Relations (1928)
- A Woman's Way (1928)
- The Younger Generation (1929)
- Mister Antonio (1929)
- The Donovan Affair (1929)
- The Quitter (1929)
- The Vagabond Lover (1929)
- Conspiracy (1930)
- The Cuckoos (1930)
- Half Shot at Sunrise (1930)
- The Royal Bed (1931)
- Way Back Home (1931)
- Too Many Cooks (1931)
- Transgression (1931)
- Cracked Nuts (1931)
- The Gay Diplomat (1931)
- Girl of the Rio (1932)
- Secrets of the French Police (1932)
- Hold 'Em Jail (1932)
- A Bill of Divorcement (1932)
- Girl Crazy (1932)
- Flying Devils (1933)
- Christopher Strong (1933)
- The Cheyenne Kid (1933)
- One Man's Journey (1933)
- If I Were Free (1933)
- Two Alone (1934)
- Down to Their Last Yacht (1934)
- Lightning Strikes Twice (1934)
- Star of Midnight (1935)
- The Ex-Mrs. Bradford (1936)
- The Bride Walks Out (1936)
- We Who Are About to Die (1937)
- Sea Devils (1937)
- Radio City Revels (1938)
- Career (1939)
- The Flying Irishman (1939)
- Let's Go Collegiate (1941)
- The Son of Monte Cristo (1941)
- Secrets of the Underground (1942)
- A Gentleman After Dark (1942)
- The Old Homestead (1942)
- Sunset Serenade (1942)
- X Marks the Spot (1942)
- Dead Man's Gulch (1943)
- False Faces (1943)
- Headin' for God's Country (1943)
- Idaho (1943)
- The Mantrap (1943)
- Mystery Broadcast (1943)
- O, My Darling Clementine (1943)
- A Scream in the Dark (1943)
- The Girl Who Dared (1944)
- End of the Road (1944)
- The Lady and the Monster (1944)
- Lake Placid Serenade (1944)
- Storm Over Lisbon (1944)
- Strangers in the Night (1944)
- Bandits of the Badlands (1945)
- Bells of Rosarita (1945)
- Girls of the Big House (1945)
- Mexicana (1945)
- The Phantom Speaks (1945)
- Tell It to a Star (1945)
- Murder in the Music Hall (1946)
- Rendezvous with Annie (1946)
- Song of Arizona (1946)
- That Brennan Girl (1946)
- Along the Oregon Trail (1947)
- Driftwood (1947)
- The Pilgrim Lady (1947)
- That's My Gal (1947)
- The Trespasser (1947)
- Under Colorado Skies (1947)
- Wyoming (1947)
- Angel in Exile (1948)
- The Bold Frontiersman (1948)
- Campus Honeymoon (1948)
- The Inside Story(1948)
- Oklahoma Badlands (1948)
- The Plunderers (1948)
- Secret Service Investigator (1948)
- Brimstone (1949)
- Death Valley Gunfighter (1949)
- Frontier Investigator (1949)
- The Last Bandit (1949)
- Navajo Trail Raiders (1949)
- Harbor of Missing Men (1949)
- California Passage (1950)
- Federal Agent at Large (1950)
- Hills of Oklahoma (1950)
- House by the River (1950)
- Rock Island Trail (1950)
- The Savage Horde (1950)
- Buckaroo Sheriff of Texas (1951)
- Fighting Coast Guard (1951)
- Street Bandits (1951)
- Cuban Fireball (1951)
- Oh! Susanna (1951)
- Gobs and Gals (1952)
- Lady Possessed (1952)
- Montana Belle (1952)
- Rose of Cimarron (1952)
- Invaders from Mars (1953)
- Untamed Heiress (1954)
- Lay That Rifle Down (1955)
- Headline Hunters (1955)
