= Sheriff of Sundown =

1944 film by Lesley Selander

- Directed by: Lesley Selander
- Written by: Norman S. Hall
- Produced by: William J. O'Sullivan
- Starring: Allan Lane; Duncan Renaldo; Max Terhune
- Cinematography: Bud Thackery
- Edited by: Harry Keller
- Distributed by: Republic Pictures
- Release date: 1944
- Running time: 55 minutes
- Country: United States
- Language: English

Sheriff of Sundown is a 1944 American Western film.

== Plot ==
When cattleman Tex Jordan (Lane) and his friends Chihuahua Ramirez (Renaldo) and Third Grade Simms (Terhune) bring their cattle to market in Sundown, Texas near the Mexican border, they learn the broker Jack Hatfield (Barcroft) is using a sliding pay scale. The larger the herd, the more he pays per head, squeezing the small ranchers like Andy Craig (Kirk). When Craig threatens to disclose the practice, he is murdered.

Sheriff Tom Carpenter (London) asks for evidence in the murder investigation, and he is also murdered. Governor Brainerd (Rawlinson) becomes involved and authorizes Jordan to act on his behalf to uncover who is behind the murders.

== Cast ==
- Allan Lane – Tex Jordan
- Tom London – Sheriff Tom Carpenter
- Roy Barcroft – Jack Hatfield
- Max Terhune – Third Grade Simms
- Duncan Renaldo – Chihuahua Ramirez
- Herbert Rawlinson – Governor Brainerd
- Jack Kirk – Andy Craig
- Bud Geary – Ward
