= Mauritz Hugo =

American actor

- Born: January 12, 1909; Östergötland, Sweden
- Died: June 16, 1974 (aged 65); Los Angeles, California, U.S.
- Other name: Axel Mauritz Hugo Ekelöf
- Occupation: Actor
- Years active: 1938-1971
- Parent(s): Ernst Robert Ekelöf; Augusta Charlotta Detterberg

Mauritz Hugo (January 12, 1909 – June 16, 1974) was a Swedish-born American film and television actor.

== Selected filmography ==
- Wanted by the Police (1938)
- Criminal Investigator (1942)
- The Crime Smasher (1943)
- Outlaws of Stampede Pass (1943)
- Secrets of a Sorority Girl (1945)
- Black Angel (1946)
- Blonde for a Day (1946)
- Renegades of Sonora (1948)
- Death Valley Gunfighter (1949)
- Search for Danger (1949)
- The Dakota Kid (1951)
- Pistol Harvest (1951)
- Captive of Billy the Kid (1952)
- Road Agent (1952)
- Yukon Gold (1952)
- Run for the Hills (1953)
- Highway Patrol (1956) E31, Jimmy's dad, "Runaway Boy"
- Wanted Dead or Alive (TV series) (1959) season 2 episode 3 (The Matchmaker) - Jenkins
- Stagecoach to Dancers' Rock (1962)
- Alvarez Kelly (1966)

== Bibliography ==
- Pitts, Michael R. (2012) Western Movies: A Guide to 5,105 Feature Films (McFarland & Company, Inc.) ISBN 978-0786463725
