= Allan Lane =

American actor (1909–1973)

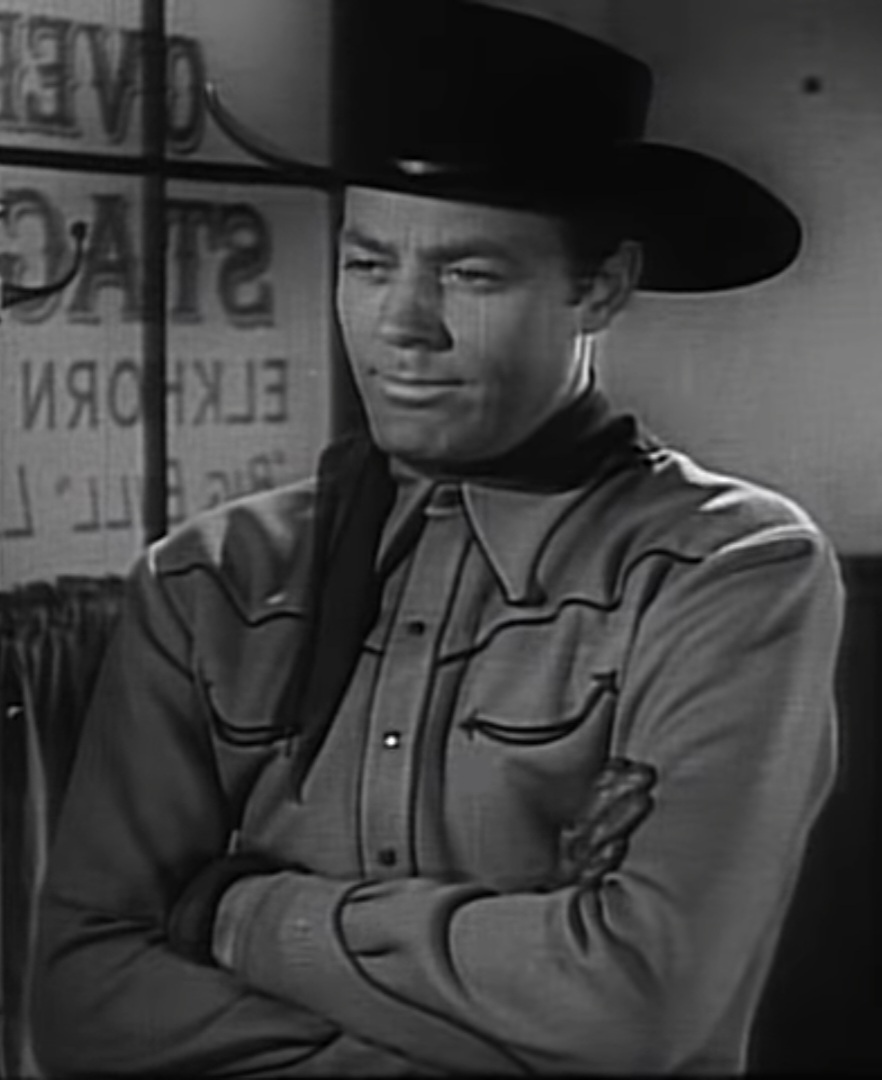
- Lane in Stagecoach to Denver (1946)
- Born: Harry Leonard Albershardt; September 22, 1909; Mishawaka, Indiana, U.S.
- Died: October 27, 1973 (aged 64); Woodland Hills, California, U.S.
- Resting place: Inglewood Park Cemetery
- Occupation: Actor
- Years active: 1929–1966
- Spouse(s): Sheila Ryan (m. 1945; div. 1946) Gladys Leslie (m. 19??; div. 19??)

Allan "Rocky" Lane (born Harry Leonard Albershardt; September 22, 1909 – October 27, 1973) was an American actor. He was the star of many cowboy B-movies in the 1940s and 1950s. He appeared in more than 125 films and TV shows in a career lasting from 1929 to 1966. He is best known for his portrayal of Red Ryder and for being the voice of the talking horse on the television series Mister Ed from 1961 to 1966.

== Biography ==
Lane was born Harry Leonard Albershardt or Albershart (sources differ) in Mishawaka, Indiana to Linnie Anne and William H. Albershardt. He grew up in Grand Rapids, Michigan.

Lane had been a photographer, model and stage actor by age 20. He played varsity sports, baseball, football, and basketball at the University of Notre Dame but dropped out to pursue his interests in acting.

== Film career ==
Lane's first film role for Fox was as a romantic lead opposite June Collyer in the 1929 release, Not Quite Decent (now a lost film). He made several other films at Fox but signed with Warner Bros.

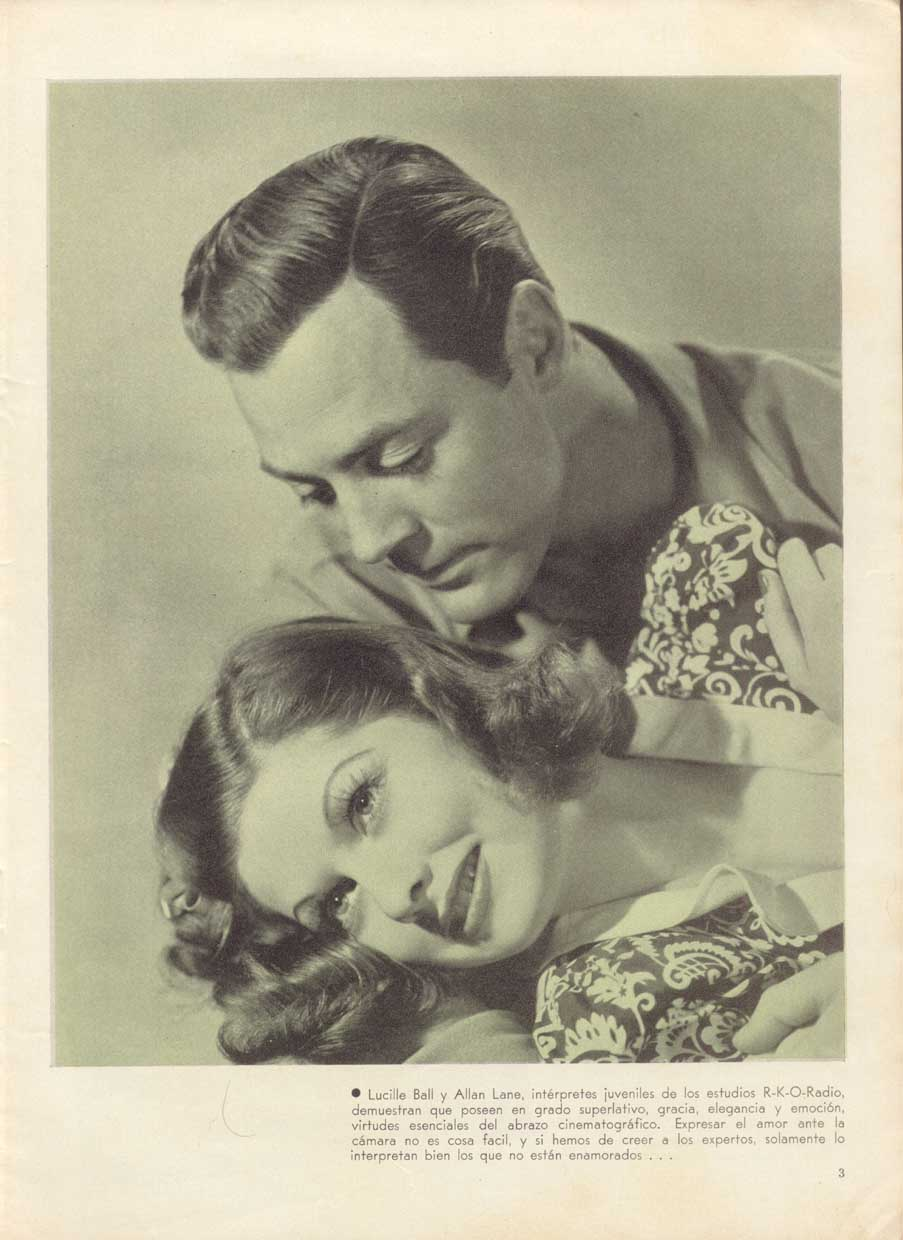
Publicity photo with Lucille Ball in Panama Lady (1939)

While at Warner his career foundered, and after a number of bit parts he left films in the early 1930s. By 1936, Lane returned to films and to 20th Century-Fox, taking highly visible supporting roles in Charlie Chan at the Olympics and the Shirley Temple film Stowaway (both 1936). He kept playing supporting roles at Fox though 1937, but had not yet advanced to starring roles; he took the lead in a Republic Pictures feature, The Duke Comes Back (1937).

After his stopover at Republic he signed with RKO for a two-year stint but, again, he was used in supporting roles as part of the studio's stock company.

When his RKO employment ran out, he returned to Republic, where he auditioned for the lead in a serial. The directors were William Witney and John English. Witney later found Lane to be difficult to deal with, and remembered the interview:

He had worked in a picture at RKO and seemed like a nice person. I asked what he did for a living before he tried acting. He said he'd been a used car salesman. Later Jack and I were mulling over our mistake and Jack said, "When he said 'used car salesman' we should've turned him down." When he turned to leave the office we also noted he had a big fat ass. Later we found the ass part fit the whole man. He rode a horse like the saddle was on backwards and he was sitting on the horn. His expressions were all the same whether he was doing comedy or tragedy.

Witney and English hired Lane anyway, and Lane portrayed "RCMP Sergeant Dave King" in two Royal Canadian Mounted Police adventure serials, King of the Royal Mounted and King of the Mounties. Lane worked for Republic almost exclusively from then on, although Fox called him in for a 1943 Laurel and Hardy feature, The Dancing Masters.

In 1946 and 1947, Lane portrayed Red Ryder in seven western features, replacing Wild Bill Elliott in that role. The following year, he became "Rocky Lane" in Western films.

Between 1940 and 1966, Lane made 82 film and television series appearances, mostly in westerns. Between 1947 and 1953, he made more than 30 B-movie westerns (as "Rocky" Lane) with his horse "Black Jack".

One of Allan Lane's most familiar television credits is "Lamb to the Slaughter" (1958), a memorable episode of Alfred Hitchcock Presents. Lane is a murder victim whose death is investigated by the local police.

His last roles were in voice-over acting, including providing the speech for Mister Ed (1961–1966). He was never credited on-screen for being the voice of the talking horse.

== Death ==
Lane died of cancer in Woodland Hills, California, on October 27, 1973, at age 64. He was interred at Inglewood Park Cemetery.

== In popular culture ==
Lane was one of the movie cowboys named in the lyrics of the song “Whatever Happened to Randolph Scott” by The Statler Brothers, which became a hit single in 1974.

== Comics ==
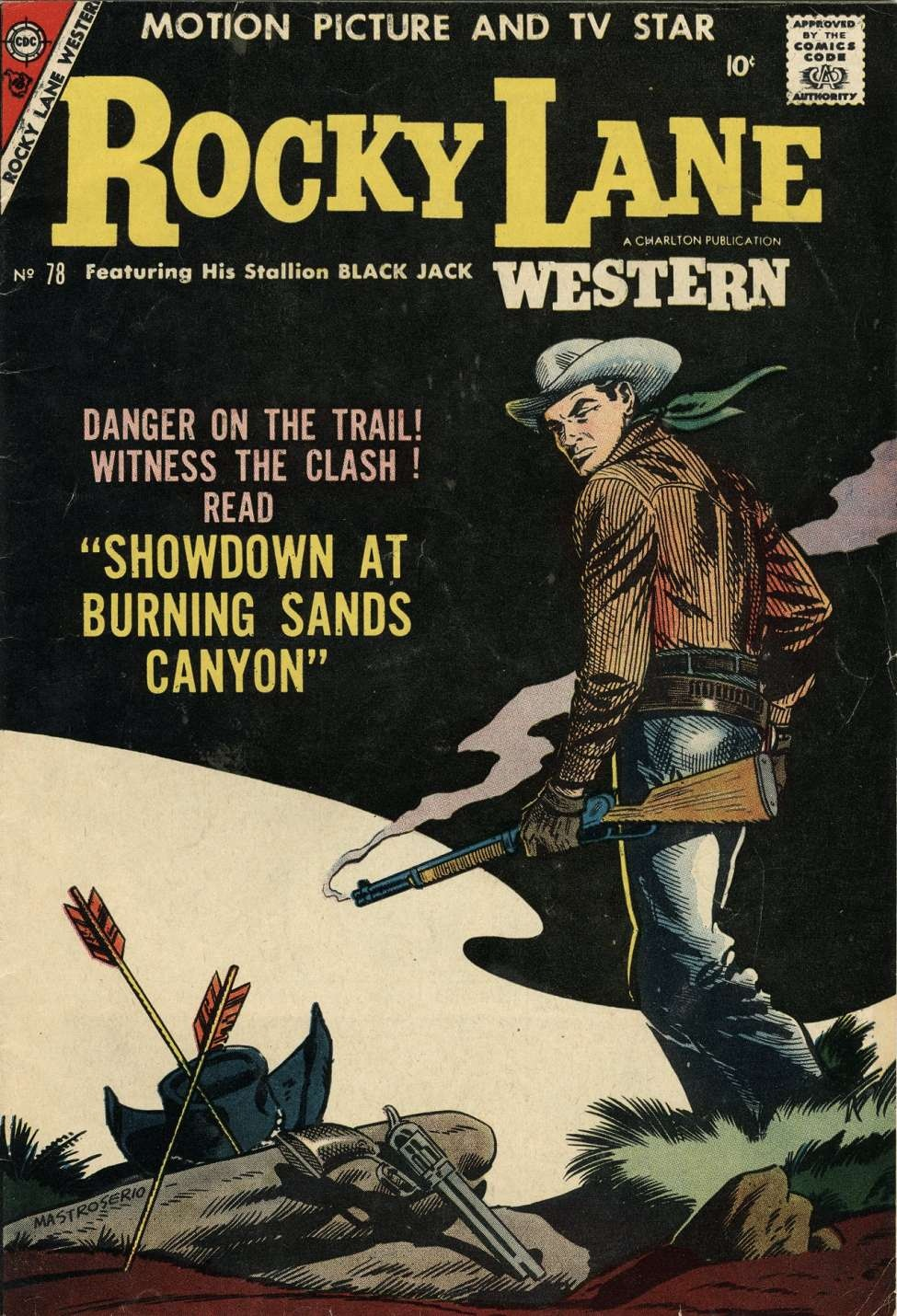
Rocky Lane Western #78 (December 1957), Charlton Comics, art by Rocke Mastroserio.

Allan "Rocky" Lane was often portrayed in the celebrity comics by his nickname, Rocky Lane, primarily during the heyday of Western-themed comics in the 1940s and 1950s.

The actor was featured in the comic book Rocky Lane Western, published in 1949 by Fawcett Comics. The series was published by the company until 1954, when it left the comics market following the lawsuit "National Comics Publications, Inc. v. Fawcett Publications, Inc.." Charlton Comics took over the title that same year, starting with issue #56 and ending with issue #87, published in 1959. The publisher also released a comic series starring his horse, Black Jack, titled Rocky Lane's Black Jack.

In Brazil, the Rocky Lane stories were published by Rio Gráfica Editora (RGE) in the 1960s. Between 1965 and 1968, the publisher even commissioned local stories from Primaggio Mantovi, an Italian cartoonist who became a naturalized Brazilian citizen.

== Selected filmography ==
- Not Quite Decent (1929) as Jerry Connor
- The Forward Pass (1929) as Ed Kirby
- Love in the Rough (1930) as Johnson
- Madame Satan (1930) as Zeppelin Majordomo (uncredited)
- Night Nurse (1931) as Intern (uncredited)
- The Star Witness (1931) as Young Deputy at the Leeds Home (uncredited)
- Honor of the Family (1931) as Joseph
- Expensive Women (1931) as Party Boy with Bobby (uncredited)
- Local Boy Makes Good (1931) as Runner with a Bad Knee (uncredited)
- The Famous Ferguson Case (1932) as Reporter (uncredited)
- The Tenderfoot (1932) as Actor (uncredited)
- Week-End Marriage (1932) as Office Clerk (uncredited)
- Winner Take All (1932) as Monty - Joan's Friend (uncredited)
- Miss Pinkerton (1932) as Herbert Wynn (scenes deleted)
- Crooner (1932) as Heckler on Dance Floor (uncredited)
- A Successful Calamity (1932) as Polo Player (uncredited)
- The Crash (1932) as Geoffrey's Associate (uncredited)
- One Way Passage (1932) as Friend of Joan's (uncredited)
- Laughing at Trouble (1936) as John Campbell
- Stowaway (1936) as Richard Hope
- Step Lively, Jeeves! (1937) as Party Guest (uncredited)
- Charlie Chan at the Olympics (1937) as Richard Masters
- The Jones Family in Big Business (1937) as Ted Hewett
- Fifty Roads to Town (1937) as Leroy Smedley
- Sing and Be Happy (1937) as Hamilton Howe
- The Duke Comes Back (1937) as Duke Foster
- Night Spot (1938) as Pete Cooper
- Maid's Night Out (1938) as Bill Norman
- This Marriage Business (1938) as Bill Bennett
- Having Wonderful Time (1938) as Maxwell Pingwell aka Mac
- Crime Ring (1938) as Joe Ryan
- Fugitives for a Night (1938) as John Nelson
- The Law West of Tombstone (1938) as Danny Sanders
- Pacific Liner (1939) as Bilson
- Twelve Crowded Hours (1939) as Dave Sanders
- They Made Her a Spy (1939) as James Huntley
- Panama Lady (1939) as Dennis McTeague
- The Spellbinder (1939) as Steve Kindal
- Conspiracy (1939) as Steve Kendall
- Grand Ole Opry (1940) as Fred Barnes
- King of the Royal Mounted (1940, Serial) as Dave King
- All-American Co-Ed (1941) as Second Senior
- King of the Mounties (1942) as Sergeant Dave King
- Air Force (1943) as Marine (uncredited)
- Daredevils of the West (1943) as Duke Cameron
- The Dancing Masters (1943) as George Worthing
- Call of the South Seas (1944) as Kendall Gaige
- The Tiger Woman (1944) as Allen Saunders
- Silver City Kid (1944) as Jack Adams
- Stagecoach to Monterey (1944) as Bruce Redmond - Posing as Chick Weaver
- Sheriff of Sundown (1944) as Tex Jordan
- The Topeka Terror (1945) as Chad Stevens
- Corpus Christi Bandits (1945) as Captain James Christie / Corpus Christi Jim
- Bells of Rosarita (1945) as Himself
- Trail of Kit Carson (1945) as Bill Harmon
- Gay Blades (1946) as Andy Buell
- A Guy Could Change (1946) as Michael 'Mike' Hogan
- Night Train to Memphis (1946) as Dan Acuff
- Santa Fe Uprising (1946) as Red Ryder
- Out California Way (1946) as Himself
- Stagecoach to Denver (1946) as Red Ryder
- Vigilantes of Boomtown (1947) as Red Ryder
- Homesteaders of Paradise Valley (1947) as Red Ryder
- Oregon Trail Scouts (1947) as Red Ryder
- Rustlers of Devil's Canyon (1947) as Red Ryder
- Marshal of Cripple Creek (1947) as Red Ryder
- The Wild Frontier (1947) as Rocky Lane
- Bandits of Dark Canyon (1947) as Rocky Lane
- Oklahoma Badlands (1948) as Allan Rocky Lane
- The Bold Frontiersman (1948) as Rocky Lane
- Carson City Raiders (1948) as Rocky Lane
- Marshal of Amarillo (1948) as Marshal Rocky Lane
- Desperadoes of Dodge City (1948) as Rocky Lane
- The Denver Kid (1948) as Rocky Lane Posing as the Denver Kid
- Sundown in Santa Fe (1948) as Rocky Lane
- Renegades of Sonora (1948) as Rocky Lane
- Sheriff of Wichita (1949) as Sheriff Rocky Lane
- Death Valley Gunfighter (1949) as Rocky Lane
- Frontier Investigator (1949) as Rocky Lane
- The Wyoming Bandit (1949) as Marshal Rocky Lane
- Bandit King of Texas (1949) as Rocky Lane
- Navajo Trail Raiders (1949) as Rocky Lane
- Powder River Rustlers (1949) as Rocky Lane
- Gunmen of Abilene (1950) as Rocky Lane
- Code of the Silver Sage (1950) as Lieutenant Rocky Lane
- Salt Lake Raiders (1950) as Deputy Marshal Rocky Lane
- Covered Wagon Raid (1950) as Rocky Lane
- Vigilante Hideout (1950) as Rocky Lane
- Frisco Tornado (1950) as Marshal Rocky Lane
- Rustlers on Horseback (1950) as Marshal Rocky Lane
- Trail of Robin Hood (1950) as Rocky Lane
- Rough Riders of Durango (1951) as Rocky Lane
- Night Riders of Montana (1951) as Rocky Lane
- Wells Fargo Gunmaster (1951) as Rocky Lane
- Fort Dodge Stampede (1951) as Deputy Sheriff Rocky Lane
- Desert of Lost Men (1951) as Rocky Lane
- Captive of Billy the Kid (1952) as Marshal 'Rocky' Lane
- Leadville Gunslinger (1952) as U. S. Marshal Rocky Lane
- Black Hills Ambush (1952) as Rocky Lane
- Thundering Caravans (1952) as Marshal Rocky Lane
- Desperadoes' Outpost (1952) as Rocky Lane
- Marshal of Cedar Rock (1953) as Marshal Rocky Lane
- Savage Frontier (1953) as U.S. Marshal Rocky Lane
- Bandits of the West (1953) as Marshal Rocky Lane
- El Paso Stampede (1953) as Rocky Lane
- The Saga of Hemp Brown (1958) as Sheriff
- Hell Bent for Leather (1960) as Kelsey
- Posse from Hell (1961) as Burl Hogan

=== Television ===
Series

- Mister Ed, 1961–1966 syndicated and later CBS TV series. Lane provided the voice for Mister Ed. This was an uncredited role.
- Red Ryder, 1956–1957 TV series. Lane portrayed Red Ryder

Guest appearances

- Cheyenne, episode "Massacre at Gunsight Pass", originally aired May 1, 1961
- Gunsmoke, episode "Long Hours, Short Pay", originally aired April 29, 1961
- Bonanza, episode "The Blood Line", originally aired December 31, 1960
- Gunsmoke, episode "The Badge", originally aired November 12, 1960
- Lawman, episode "The Payment", originally aired May 8, 1960
- Bronco, episode "Death of an Outlaw", originally aired March 8, 1960
- Colt .45, episode "Arizona Anderson", originally aired February 14, 1960
- Tales of Wells Fargo, episode "The Reward", originally aired April 21, 1958
- Wagon Train, episode "The Daniel Barrister Story", originally aired April 16, 1958
- Alfred Hitchcock Presents (season 3, episode 28: "Lamb to the Slaughter") (originally aired April 13, 1958) as Patrick Maloney
- Gunsmoke, episode "Texas Cowboys", originally aired April 5, 1958
- Mike Hammer, episode "Husbands Are Bad Luck", originally aired 1957
