= R. G. Springsteen =

American film director (1904–1989)

Robert G. Springsteen (September 8, 1904 – December 9, 1989) was an American director of Hollywood B movies and television shows. He was most often credited on screen as R. G. Springsteen.

== Biography ==
Born in Tacoma, Washington, in 1904, Springsteen started working in Hollywood during the 1920s. He was hired by Fox Studios as a wardrobe assistant. In 1936 he moved to directing and worked as a Second unit, or assistant, director on numerous low budget B movies. During this time film credits often listed him by the nickname of Bud Springsteen. By 1945 Springsteen became a lead director and established himself as a filmmaker with his first B Western, Marshal of Laredo. From 1945 through 1968, Springsteen was a prolific director of Hollywood B Westerns and television episodes initially with Republic Pictures and later with A.C. Lyles's series of Westerns for Paramount Pictures. His last directing job came in 1968 with an episode of the television series Gentle Ben.

R. G. Springsteen died on December 9, 1989, in Los Angeles, California.

== Partial filmography ==
- Tiger by the Tail (1970)
- Hostile Guns (1967)
- Red Tomahawk (1967)
- Waco (1966)
- Johnny Reno (1966)
- Apache Uprising (1966)
- Black Spurs (1965)
- Taggart (1964)
- Bullet for a Badman (1964)
- He Rides Tall (1964)
- Showdown (1963)
- Operation Eichmann (1961)
- Battle Flame (1959)
- King of the Wild Stallions (1959)
- Revolt in the Big House (1958)
- Cole Younger, Gunfighter (1958)
- Affair in Reno (1957)
- When Gangland Strikes (1956)
- Come Next Spring (1956)
- Secret Venture (1955)
- Cross Channel (1955)
- Double Jeopardy (1955)
- Track the Man Down (1955)
- I Cover the Underworld (1955)
- Geraldine (1953)
- A Perilous Journey (1953)
- Toughest Man in Arizona (1952)
- Tropical Heat Wave (1952)
- Gobs and Gals (1952)
- The Fabulous Senorita (1952)
- Oklahoma Annie (1952)
- Street Bandits (1951)
- Honeychile (1951)
- Million Dollar Pursuit (1951)
- Frisco Tornado (1950)
- Covered Wagon Raid (1950)
- Hills of Oklahoma (1950)
- The Arizona Cowboy (1950)
- Harbor of Missing Men (1950)
- Belle of Old Mexico (1950)
- Singing Guns (1950)
- Navajo Trail Raiders (1949)
- Flame of Youth (1949)
- The Red Menace (1949)
- Hellfire (1949)
- Death Valley Gunfighter (1949)
- Sheriff of Wichita (1949)
- Renegades of Sonora (1948)
- Sundown in Santa Fe (1948)
- Son of God's Country (1948)
- Out of the Storm (1948)
- Secret Service Investigator (1948)
- Heart of Virginia (1948)
- The Main Street Kid (1948)
- Under Colorado Skies (1947)
- Along the Oregon Trail (1947)
- Marshal of Cripple Creek (1947)
- Rustlers of Devil's Canyon (1947)
- Oregon Trail Scouts (1947)
- Homesteaders of Paradise Valley (1947)
- Vigilantes of Boomtown (1947)
- Stagecoach to Denver (1946)
- Santa Fe Uprising (1946)
- Conquest of Cheyenne (1946)
- Man from Rainbow Valley (1946)
- Sun Valley Cyclone (1946)
- Home on the Range (1946)
- Sheriff of Redwood Valley (1946)
- California Gold Rush (1946)
- Wagon Wheels Westward (1945)
- Colorado Pioneers (1945)
- Marshal of Laredo (1945)
