= Earle Snell =

American screenwriter

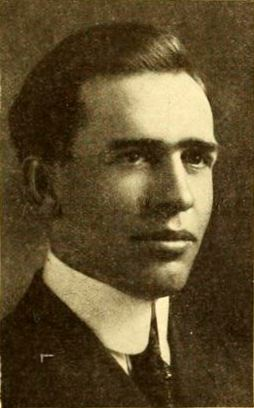
- Born: May 23, 1886; Santa Ana, California, United States
- Died: May 6, 1965 (aged 78); Hollywood, California, United States
- Occupation: Screenwriter
- Years active: 1919–1956 (film)

Earle Snell (1886–1965) was an American screenwriter. He worked on more than a hundred screenplays, beginning in the silent era. He worked for Universal Pictures as well as a variety of smaller independent studios. Much of his later work was for Republic Pictures.

== Selected filmography ==
- The Busher (1919)
- Just Squaw (1919)
- The Knockout (1925)
- The Half-Way Girl (1925)
- I Want My Man (1925)
- On Your Toes (1927)
- The Denver Dude (1927)
- Let It Rain (1927)
- Good Morning, Judge (1928)
- The Night Bird (1928)
- That's My Daddy (1928)
- The Fourflusher (1928)
- The Cohens and the Kellys in Atlantic City (1929)
- One Hysterical Night (1929)
- Clear the Decks (1929)
- It Can Be Done (1929)
- Hot Curves (1930)
- Embarrassing Moments (1930)
- The Pocatello Kid (1931)
- Subway Express (1931)
- Range Law (1931)
- Tombstone Canyon (1932)
- Steady Company (1932)
- Fast Companions (1932)
- Racing Youth (1932)
- Her First Mate (1933)
- Fargo Express (1933)
- Let's Be Ritzy (1934)
- Gridiron Flash (1934)
- Love Past Thirty (1934)
- Half a Sinner (1934)
- The Countess of Monte Cristo (1934)
- Branded a Coward (1935)
- Stone of Silver Creek (1935)
- Escape from Devil's Island (1935)
- Two in a Crowd (1936)
- Burning Gold (1936)
- Roaming Lady (1936)
- Wild Brian Kent (1936)
- Desert Phantom (1936)
- Everyman's Law (1936)
- Rainbow on the River (1936)
- Sunset of Power (1936)
- King of the Royal Mounted (1936)
- Rogue of the Range (1936)
- Make a Wish (1937)
- Western Gold (1937)
- It Happened Out West (1937)
- Secret Valley (1937)
- Wide Open Faces (1938)
- Private Detective (1939)
- Days of Jesse James (1939)
- Torchy Runs for Mayor (1939)
- Torchy Blane... Playing with Dynamite (1939)
- Homicide Bureau (1939)
- West of Pinto Basin (1940)
- Covered Wagon Days (1940)
- The Trail Blazers (1940)
- Saddle Mountain Roundup (1941)
- Gauchos of Eldorado (1941)
- Borrowed Hero (1941)
- Trail of the Silver Spurs (1941)
- The Kid's Last Ride (1941)
- Wrangler's Roost (1941)
- Tonto Basin Outlaws (1941)
- Thunder River Feud (1942)
- Rock River Renegades (1942)
- Brooklyn Orchid (1942)
- The McGuerins from Brooklyn (1942)
- Yanks Ahoy (1943)
- Taxi, Mister (1943)
- Bowery Champs (1944)
- Shadow of Suspicion (1944)
- Three of a Kind (1944)
- Colorado Pioneers (1945)
- Phantom of the Plains (1945)
- Wagon Wheels Westward (1945)
- Come Out Fighting (1945)
- Santa Fe uprising (1946)
- Sun Valley Cyclone (1946)
- Sheriff of Redwood Valley (1946)
- Conquest of Cheyenne (1946)
- Stagecoach to Denver (1946)
- Alias Billy the Kid (1946)
- The Last Round-Up (1947)
- Robin Hood of Texas (1947)
- Rustlers of Devil's Canyon (1947)
- Homesteaders of Paradise Valley (1947)
- Along the Oregon Trail (1947)
- Vigilantes of Boomtown (1947)
- Marshal of Cripple Creek (1947)
- Oregon Trail Scouts (1947)
- Carson City Raiders (1948)
- El Dorado Pass (1948)
- Desert Vigilante (1949)
- Two Knights from Brooklyn (1949)
- Renegades of the Sage (1949)
- South of Death Valley (1949)
- Valley of Fire (1951)
- The Desperados Are in Town (1956)

== Bibliography ==
- Martin, Len D. The Republic Pictures Checklist: Features, Serials, Cartoons, Short Subjects and Training Films of Republic Pictures Corporation, 1935–1959. McFarland, 1998.
- Pitts, Michael R. Poverty Row Studios, 1929–1940: An Illustrated History of 55 Independent Film Companies, with a Filmography for Each. McFarland & Company, 2005.
