= Martha Wentworth =

American actress (1889–1974)

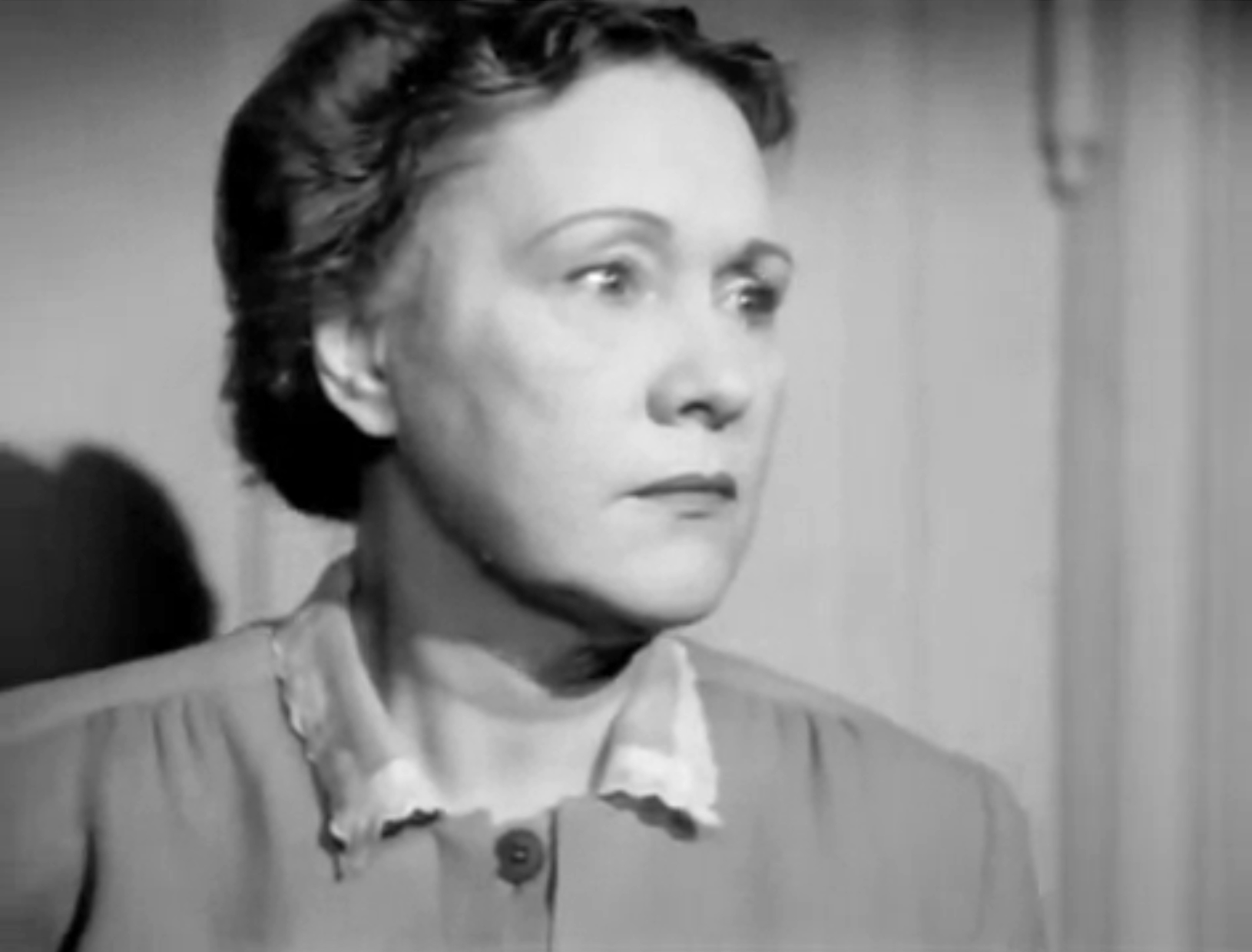
- Wentworth in The Stranger (1946)
- Born: Verna Martha Wentworth; June 2, 1889; New York City, U.S.
- Died: March 8, 1974 (aged 84); Sherman Oaks, Los Angeles, U.S.
- Occupation: Actress
- Years active: 1920s–1966
- Spouse: Albert Stuart Otto Sr. (m. 1914; div. 1926)
- Children: 2

Verna Martha Wentworth (June 2, 1889 – March 8, 1974) was an American actress. Her vocal variety led to her being called the "Actress of 100 Voices".

== Biography ==
Wentworth was born on June 2, 1889, in New York City. After graduating from public school, she attended the National School of Expression. She was one of Minnie Maddern Fiske's proteges and appeared in several stage productions, beginning when she was 17 years old.

Wentworth's long radio career began in the early 1920s. She played The Wintergreen Witch on The Cinnamon Bear (1937) radio program, Annie Wood and Mrs. Littlefield on Crime Classics (1953), and Ma Danields on The Gallant Heart (1944). She portrayed Joe Penner's mother on The Park Avenue Penners. She also had semi-regular roles on Broadway Is My Beat, On Stage, The Witch's Tale, The Baby Snooks Show, and The Abbott and Costello Show. She voiced Mama Katzenjammer in the Katzenjammer Kids adaptation of The Captain and the Kids.

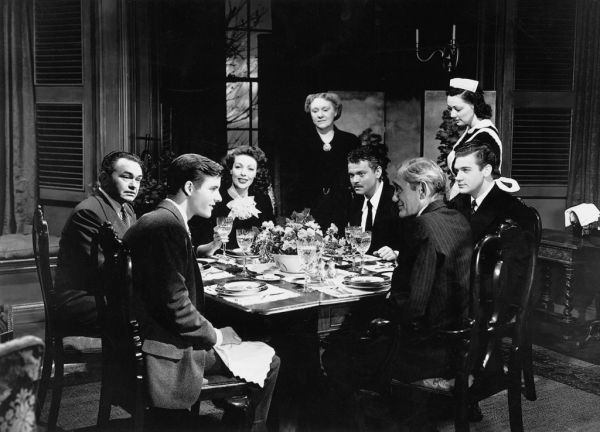
Left to right: Edward G. Robinson, Richard Long, Loretta Young, Wentworth, Orson Welles, Philip Merivale, Byron Keith, and an unidentified actress in The Stranger (1946)

In the 1940s, Wentworth became a film actress in several Red Ryder Western films. She is in Lassie as neighbor Bertha, first aired on March 22, 1959's season 5 episode 29. She voiced roles in two Walt Disney Productions: Nanny, Queenie the Cow and Lucy the Goose in One Hundred and One Dalmatians (1961) and Madam Mim in The Sword in the Stone (1963), her final credited film appearance.

Wentworth died on March 8, 1974, aged 84.

== Selected filmography ==
- Poor Little Me (1935, short) - Singer (first role, uncredited)
- Who Killed Cock Robin? (1935, short) - Jenny Wren (voice, uncredited)
- Broken Toys (1935, short) - ZaSu Pitts, Mae West (voice, uncredited)
- Bottles (1936, short) - Witch Hazel (voice, uncredited)
- The Blow Out (1936, Looney Tunes short) - The Mad Bomber (voice, uncredited)
- Prison Shadows (1936) - Mrs. Murphy (uncredited)
- I Love to Singa (1936, Merrie Melodies short) - Mother Owl (voice, uncredited)
- The Old House (1936, short) - Radio Witch (voice, uncredited)
- Toby Tortoise Returns (1936, short) - Jenny Wren (voice, uncredited)
- At Your Service Madame (1936, Merrie Melodies short) - Mrs. Hamhock (voice, uncredited)
- The CooCoo Nut Grove (1936, Merrie Melodies short) - Mae West (voice, uncredited)
- Little Cheeser (1936, short) - Mother (voice, uncredited)
- Pigs Is Pigs (1937, Merrie Melodies short) - Mrs. Hamhock (voice, uncredited)
- The Masque Raid (1937, short) - Witch (voice, uncredited)
- Cleaning House (1938, short) - Mama (voice, uncredited)
- Blue Monday (1938, short) - Mama (voice, uncredited)
- The Captain's Pup (1938, short) - Mama (voice, uncredited)
- A Day at the Beach (1938, short) - Mama (voice, uncredited)
- Old Smokey (1938, short) - Mama (voice, uncredited)
- The Kangaroo Kid (1938, short) - Mother Kangaroo (voice, uncredited)
- Petunia Natural Park (1939, short) - Mama (voice, uncredited)
- The Bookworm (1939, short) - Witch (voice, uncredited)
- Peace on Earth (1939, short) - Mother Squirrel (voice, uncredited)
- A Rainy Day (1940, short) - Mama Bear (voice, uncredited)
- Waterloo Bridge (1940) - Tart on Bridge at the End (uncredited)
- Wildcat Bus (1940) - Mrs. Waters (uncredited)
- Papa Gets the Bird (1940, short) - Mama Bear (voice, uncredited)
- Who Killed Aunt Maggie? (1940) - Housekeeper (uncredited)
- Bowery Blitzkrieg (1941) - Mrs. Brady
- Dr. Jekyll and Mr. Hyde (1941) - Landlady (uncredited)
- The Field Mouse (1941, short) - Ma Mouse (voice, uncredited)
- Fraidy Cat (1942, Tom and Jerry short) - woman in "witching hour" radio program (voice, uncredited)
- The Hungry Wolf (1942, short) - Mother Rabbit (voice, uncredited)
- The Adventures of Martin Eden (1942) - Proprietress (uncredited)
- Rudyard Kipling's Jungle Book (1942) - White Hood (voice, uncredited)
- Clancy Street Boys (1943) - Mrs. Molly McGinnis
- Strange Affair (1944) - Proprietress (uncredited)
- A Tree Grows in Brooklyn (1945) - Sheila's Mother (uncredited)
- Fallen Angel (1945) - Hotel Maid (uncredited)
- Adventure (1945) - Woman (uncredited)
- The Stranger (1946) - Sara
- Santa Fe Uprising (1946) - The Duchess
- Stagecoach to Denver (1946) - The Duchess (Red's Aunt)
- Vigilantes of Boomtown (1947) - Duchess Wentworth
- Oregon Trail Scouts (1947) - The Duchess
- Rustlers of Devil's Canyon (1947) - The Duchess
- Marshal of Cripple Creek (1947) - The Duchess
- His Bitter Half (1950, Merrie Melodies short) - Daffy Duck's wife (voice, uncredited)
- Love Nest (1951) - Mrs. Thompson (uncredited)
- She Couldn't Say No (1952) - Mrs. Holbert (uncredited)
- Young Man with Ideas (1952) - Mrs. Hammerty
- Willie the Kid (1952, short) - Myrtle Smith (voice, uncredited)
- You for Me (1952) - Lucille's Mother (uncredited)
- O. Henry's Full House (1952) - Mrs. O'Brien (segment "The Last Leaf") (uncredited)
- My Man and I (1952) - Nancy's Landlady (uncredited)
- The Clown (1953) - Neighbor (uncredited)
- One Girl's Confession (1953) - Old Lady
- The Human Jungle (1954) - Marcy, Janitress (uncredited)
- Jupiter's Darling (1955) - Widow Titus
- Blackboard Jungle (1955) - Mrs. Lucy Brophy (uncredited)
- Artists and Models (1955) - Fat Lady (uncredited)
- Good Morning, Miss Dove (1955) - Annie Holloway (uncredited)
- The Man with the Golden Arm (1955) - Vangie (uncredited)
- The Killer Is Loose (1956) - Apartment House Manager's Wife (uncredited)
- Rock Around the Clock (1956) - Miss Anna Dunlap - Chaperone (uncredited)
- The Desperados Are in Town (1956) - Mrs. Joan Tawson (uncredited)
- Monkey on My Back (1957) - Landlady (uncredited)
- The Daughter of Dr. Jekyll (1957) - Mrs. Felicity Merchant
- Go, Johnny, Go! (1959) - Mrs. Kimberley McGillicuddy
- The Beatniks (1960) - Nadine
- One Hundred and One Dalmatians (1961) - Nanny / Queenie / Lucy (voice)
- The Sword in the Stone (1963) - Madam Mim / Granny Squirrel / Scullery Maid (shared role with Barbara Jo Allen) (voice)
- Mary Poppins (1964) - Cockney Cow (voice, uncredited) (final film role)
