= Gordon Kay =

American film producer

Gordon Kay (6 September 1916 - 8 March 2005) was an American film producer who specialised in Westerns, working mostly at Republic Studios where he produced 26 Allan "Rocky" Lane westerns beginning in 1947 and Universal International. He made a number of movies with Audie Murphy.

== Select credits ==
- Carson City Raiders (1948)
- Code of the Silver Sage (1950)
- Gunmen of Abilene (1950)
- Salt Lake Raiders (1950)
- Hell Bent for Leather (1960)
- Seven Ways from Sundown (1960)
- Posse from Hell (1961)
- Six Black Horses (1962)
- Showdown (1963)
- Bullet for a Badman (1964)
- Gunpoint (1966)
