= Roy Barcroft =

American actor (1902–1969)

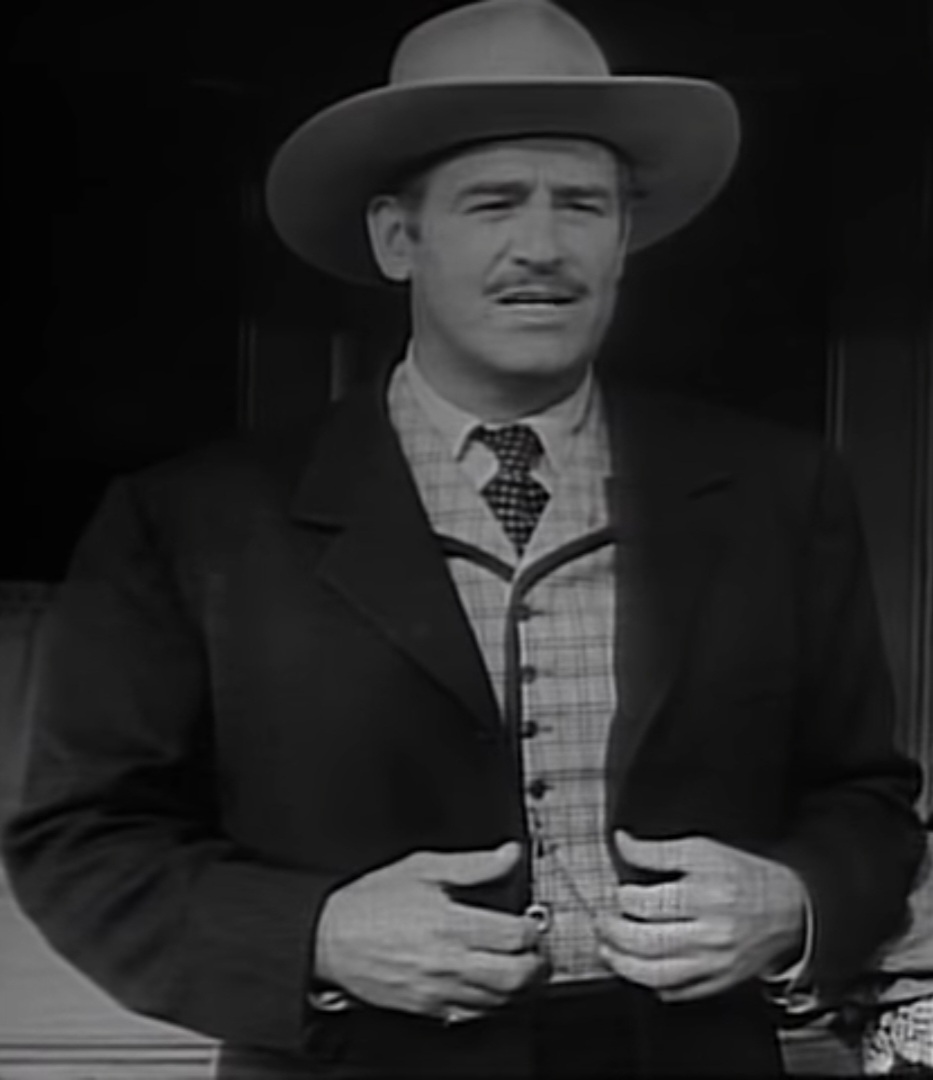
- Barcroft in Stagecoach to Denver (1946)
- Born: Howard Harold Ravenscroft; September 7, 1902; Crab Orchard, Nebraska, U.S.
- Died: November 28, 1969 (aged 67); Woodland Hills, Los Angeles, California, U.S.
- Other names: Big Roy, Roy Bancroft, Howard Clifford Ravenscroft, Roy Barcroft
- Occupation: Actor
- Years active: 1937–1969
- Spouse: Vera Thompson (m. 1932)

Roy Barcroft (born Howard Harold Ravenscroft; September 7, 1902 – November 28, 1969) was an American character actor famous for playing villains in B-Westerns and other genres. From 1937 to 1957, he appeared in more than 300 films for Republic Pictures. Film critic Leonard Maltin acclaimed Barcroft as "Republic Pictures' number one bad guy".

== Background ==
Barcroft was born to a farming family in Crab Orchard, Nebraska, in 1902. In 1917, at the age of 15, he joined the United States Army during World War I to fight in France, where he was wounded in action. After leaving the military, he drifted through several jobs (including ranch hand, roughneck, railroad worker and seaman) before reenlisting and being stationed in Hawaii.

After leaving the Army for the second time, he played clarinet and saxophone for dance bands around Chicago until he and his family moved to Los Angeles in 1929.

== Career ==
In 1929, he moved to California and worked as an extra and as a salesman. He was discovered while acting in an amateur theatre production, a hobby which he took up to improve his speaking voice as a salesman. He appeared in the film serials Flash Gordon (1936), The President's Mystery (1936), and S.O.S. Coast Guard. He worked for many different studios in the years that followed until 1943, when he signed an exclusive 10-year contract with Republic. Under this contract, he starred in almost 150 films and film serials, becoming instantly recognized as the villain to the audiences of the day.

His career slowed with the decline of B-Westerns, but he found work in television and B-movies during the 1950s and 1960s. From 1954 to 1956, Barcroft appeared in different roles in eight episodes of the syndicated western series Annie Oakley. He also played the bit role of the marshal in the 1955 film adaptation of Oklahoma!. That same year he appeared as the Marshal in the western movie The Spoilers. Between 1955 and 1957 he played Col. Jim Logan, the kindly owner of the Triple-R Boys' Ranch, in the serial Spin and Marty, seen on television's Mickey Mouse Club. A DVD version of the 1955 season, The Adventures of Spin & Marty, was released in 2005 as part of the Walt Disney Treasures series.

In 1960, he played the role of "George Farr" (a hired killer) on James Arness's TV Western Series Gunsmoke in the episode "Say Uncle" (S4 E4), again in its 1964 offering "Once A Haggen" as "Pop" (S9E18), in 1965's "Circus Trick" as "Roy" (S10 E20) & as "Jonas" in 1967's "The Returning" (S12 E22).

In 1961 on Have Gun - Will Travel he played Shep Montrose in the episode "The Long Weekend (S4 E29). He had previously played the vengeful John Griffin in S1 E28 "The Killer's Widow" which aired 3/21/1958. On May 23, 1961, Barcroft played Doc Longley in the episode "Badge of the Outsider" on the television western series Laramie, playing a retired outlaw framed for the murder of the deputy sheriff in Laramie. He appeared in a 1961 episode, "Heat Wave," of the adventure drama series Straightaway.

In the film-focused newspaper Classic Images, Laura Wagner wrote that Barcroft's work as a voice actor is often overlooked. She commented, "Barcroft can be heard in movies and on TV as narrators, radio operators, announcers, and various stray voices."

In marked contrast to his villainous movie persona, Barcroft off-screen "had a reputation as one of the nicest guys in Hollywood," said Leonard Maltin in 2005.

== Personal life ==
Barcroft married Vera Thompson in 1932, and they had two children.

== Death ==
Barcroft died of kidney cancer at the Motion Picture Country Hospital in 1969. His body was donated to medical science.

== Selected filmography ==
- The Frontiersmen (1938)
- Flash Gordon's Trip to Mars (1938, Serial) - Martian Soldier [Ch. 2] (uncredited)
- Flash Gordon Conquers the Universe (1940, Serial) - Ming's Soldier [Ch 6, 10–12] / Arborian Sentry [Ch 6] (uncredited)
- Man from Texas (1939)
- Crashing Thru (1939)
- Trailing Double Trouble (1940)
- The Bandit Trail (1941)
- The Lone Rider in Cheyenne (1942)
- Hoppy Serves a Writ (1943)
- Canyon City (1943)
- Sheriff of Sundown (1944)
- Call of the South Seas (1944)
- Girls of the Big House (1945)
- Along the Navajo Trail (1945)
- The Purple Monster Strikes (1945)
- Sunset in El Dorado (1945)
- Oregon Trail Scouts (1947)
- Vigilantes of Boomtown (1947)
- The Wild Frontier (1947)
- Wyoming (1947)
- The Bold Frontiersman (1948)
- The Far Frontier (1948)
- Oklahoma Badlands (1948)
- Renegades of Sonora (1948)
- Train to Alcatraz (1948)
- Frontier Investigator (1949)
- The Dakota Kid (1951)
- Radar Men from the Moon (1953; Commando Cody/Rocketman series)
- Down Laredo Way (1953)
- Man Without a Star (1955)
- Oklahoma! (1955)
- The Spoilers (1955)
- Band of Angels (1957) as Gillespie
- Gunsmoke (Episode "SKY", 1959) - Ma Torvet
- Billy the Kid Versus Dracula (1966)
- Texas Across the River (1966)
- Bandolero! (1968)
- Monte Walsh (1970)

== Television ==
1963	Andy Griffith Show	Clint Biggers	Episode 30 season 3, Dogs, Dogs, Dogs. He owned the 11 dogs.	1961	Rawhide	Casey	S4:E4, "Judgement at Hondo Seco"
1962	Gunsmoke	Cotter	S8:E19, "Cotter's Girl"				
1963	Rawhide	Sanders	S5:E18, "Incident of the Mountain Man"				
1963	Rawhide	Cliff Stanton	S5:E30, "Incident at Alkali Sink"				
1963	Rawhide	Sheriff	S6:E10, "Incident at Confidence Creek"				
1965	Rawhide	Adams	S8:E4, "Walk into Terror"				
