= Joseph Dubin =

American composer and orchestrator (1900–1961)

- Born: Joseph Simon Dubin; June 2, 1900; Philadelphia, Pennsylvania, U.S.
- Died: January 16, 1961 (aged 60); Sherman Oaks, California, U.S.
- Occupations: Composer, conductor
- Years active: 1920s-1961

Joseph Simon Dubin (June 2, 1900 – January 16, 1961) was an American composer and orchestrator, scoring and orchestrating more than 200 motion pictures during his career. His brother, Al Dubin (1891, Zürich – February 11, 1945, New York City) was an American songwriter, lyricist, soldier and actor. Joseph Dubin is best known for composing the soundtrack for the 1930 MGM film The Big House, as well as the Walt Disney films Cinderella, Alice in Wonderland (which was the last animated Disney feature film that he orchestrated the music for), 20,000 Leagues Under the Sea, The Adventures of Ichabod and Mr. Toad. Dubin also orchestrated and scored many television series, including Zorro and The Mickey Mouse Club.

He died at the age of 60, on January 16, 1961, in Los Angeles, California.

== Partial filmography ==
- 1979: Walt Disney's Wonderful World of Color (TV series) (sequence music score) - 1 episode)
- 1975: The Best of Walt Disney's True-Life Adventures – (original music score; orchestration)
- 1966: Cyclotrode 'X' (TV movie) – (composer: music score)
- 1961: Gunfight at Sandoval – (music score)
- 1960: Ten Who Dared – (orchestration - as Joseph S. Dubin)
- 1960: Nature's Strangest Creatures – (music score)
- 1960: Mister Magoo (TV series) – (composer - 8 episodes)
- 1959–1961: The Swamp Fox (TV series) – (music score)
- 1957–1959: Zorro (TV series) – (composer - 5 episodes)
- 1958: The Nine Lives of Elfego Baca Law and Order, Incorporated – (music score)
- 1958: Missile Monsters – (composer: music score)
- 1957: The Guns of Fort Petticoat – (composer: music score)
- 1957: Affair in Reno – (composer: music score)
- 1956: The White Squaw – (composer: music score)
- 1956: Secret of Treasure Mountain – (composer: music score)
- 1955–1959: The Mickey Mouse Club (TV series) – (music score)
- 1955: No Man's Woman – (composer: music score)
- 1955: Devil Goddess – (composer: music score)
- 1955: Headline Hunters – (composer: music score)
- 1955: The African Lion (Documentary) – (orchestration)
- 1955: Seminole Uprising – (composer: music score)
- 1955: Jungle Moon Men – (composer: music score)
- 1954: 20,000 Leagues Under the Sea – (orchestration - as Joseph S. Dubin)
- 1954: The Vanishing Prairie (Documentary) – (orchestration)
- 1954: Jungle Man-Eaters – (composer: music score)
- 1953: Killer Ape – (composer: music score)
- 1953: Toot Whistle Plunk and Boom – (music score)
- 1953: Down Laredo Way – (composer: music score)
- 1953: Abbott and Costello Meet Dr. Jekyll and Mr. Hyde – (composer: music score)
- 1953: Mission Over Korea – (composer: music score)
- 1953: Valley of the Head Hunters – (composer: music score)
- 1953: Sweethearts on Parade – (composer: music score)
- 1953: Fort Ti – (composer: music score)
- 1953: Melody (composer: music score)
- 1953: Savage Mutiny – (composer: music score)
- 1952: The Pathfinder – (composer: music score)
- 1952: Pluto's Christmas Tree – (music score)
- 1952: Voodoo Tiger – (composer: music score)
- 1952: Last Train from Bombay – (composer: music score)
- 1952: Border Saddlemates – (composer: music score)
- 1952: Jungle Jim in the Forbidden Land – (composer: music score)
- 1952: Lambert the Sheepish Lion – (music score)
- 1952: Donald Applecore – (music score)
- 1952: The Old West – (composer: music score)
- 1951: Utah Wagon Train – (composer: music score)
- 1951: Jungle Manhunt – (composer: music score)
- 1951: The Hills of Utah – (composer: music score)
- 1951: Alice in Wonderland – (orchestration)
- 1951: Lost Planet Airmen – (composer: music score)
- 1951: Government Agents vs. Phantom Legion – (composer: music score)
- 1951: The Dakota Kid – (composer: music score)
- 1951: Buckaroo Sheriff of Texas – (composer: music score)
- 1951: Don Daredevil Rides Again – (composer: music score)
- 1951: Fury of the Congo – (composer: music score)
- 1951: Home Made Home – (music score)
- 1951: Rough Riders of Durango – (composer: music score)
- 1951: The Pride of Maryland – (composer: music score)
- 1950: Out on a Limb – (music score)
- 1950: The Missourians – (composer: music score)
- 1950: Pygmy Island – (composer: music score)
- 1950: The Blazing Sun – (composer: music score)
- 1950: Under Mexicali Stars – (composer: music score)
- 1950: Rustlers on Horseback – (composer: music score)
- 1950: Redwood Forest Trail – (composer: music score)
- 1950: Frisco Tornado – (composer: music score)
- 1950: Vigilante Hideout – (composer: music score)
- 1950: Jungle Stampede – (composer: music score)
- 1950: The Old Frontier – (composer: music score)
- 1950: Covered Wagon Raid – (composer: music score)
- 1950: Curtain Call at Cactus Creek – (composer: additional music)
- 1950: The Invisible Monster – (composer: music score)
- 1950: Salt Lake Raiders – (composer: music score)
- 1950: Captive Girl – (composer: music score)
- 1950: Code of the Silver Sage – (composer: music score)
- 1950: Cinderella – (orchestration)
- 1950: Trail of the Rustlers – (composer: music score)
- 1950: Mark of the Gorilla – (composer: music score)
- 1949: Riders in the Sky – (composer: music score)
- 1949: Powder River Rustlers – (composer: music score)
- 1949: Radar Patrol vs. Spy King – (composer: music score)
- 1949: Navajo Trail Raiders – (composer: music score)
- 1949: San Antone Ambush – (composer: music score)
- 1949: The Adventures of Ichabod and Mr. Toad – (orchestration)
- 1949: Flame of Youth – (composer: music score)
- 1949: The Cowboy and the Indians – (composer: music score)
- 1949: The James Brothers of Missouri – (composer: music score)
- 1949: Bandit King of Texas – (composer: music score)
- 1949: Too Late for Tears – (composer: additional music-orchestration)
- 1949: South of Rio – (composer: music score)
- 1949: The Wyoming Bandit – (composer: music score)
- 1949: King of the Rocket Men – (composer: music score)
- 1949: Law of the Golden West – (composer: music score)
- 1949: The Lost Tribe – (composer: music score)
- 1949: Champion – (orchestration)
- 1949: Ghost of Zorro – (composer: music score)
- 1949: Duke of Chicago – (composer: music score)
- 1949: Hideout – (composer: music score)
- 1949: Daughter of the Jungle – (composer: music score)
- 1949: Rose of the Yukon – (composer: music score)
- 1948: Portrait of Jennie – (orchestration)
- 1948: Jungle Jim – (composer: music score)
- 1948: Sundown in Santa Fe – (composer: music score)
- 1948: I Surrender Dear – (composer: music score)
- 1948: The Denver Kid – (composer: music score)
- 1948: Son of God's Country – (composer: music score)
- 1948: Out of the Storm – (composer: music score)
- 1948: The Gentleman from Nowhere – (composer: music score)
- 1948: Sons of Adventure – (composer: music score)
- 1948: The Strawberry Roan – (composer: main and end title – (music score)
- 1948: Daredevils of the Clouds – (composer: music score)
- 1948: Blazing Across the Pecos – (composer: music score)
- 1948: Train to Alcatraz – (composer: music score)
- 1948: The Timber Trail – (composer: music score)
- 1948: Whirlwind Raiders – (composer: music score)
- 1948: The Bold Frontiersman – (composer: music score)
- 1948: California Firebrand – (composer: music score)
- 1948: Madonna of the Desert – (composer: music score)
- 1948: Phantom Valley – (composer: music score)
- 1948: Slippy McGee – (composer: music score)
- 1947: Bandits of Dark Canyon – (composer: music score)
- 1947: The Black Widow – (composer: music score)
- 1947: Bulldog Drummond Strikes Back – (composer: music score)
- 1947: Along the Oregon Trail – (composer: music score)
- 1947: Marshal of Cripple Creek – (composer: music score)
- 1947: Saddle Pals – (composer: music score)
- 1947: The Long Night – (orchestration)
- 1947: Oregon Trail Scouts – (composer: music score)
- 1947: Apache Rose – (composer: additional music)
- 1947: Vigilantes of Boomtown – (composer: music score)
- 1947: Last Frontier Uprising – (composer: music score)
- 1947: Dead Reckoning – (orchestration)
- 1946: Stagecoach to Denver – (composer: music score)
- 1946: Rendezvous with Annie – (music score)
- 1946: The Last Crooked Mile – (music score)
- 1946: G.I. War Brides – (music score)
- 1946: The Crimson Ghost – (composer: music score)
- 1946: Home in Oklahoma – (composer – music score)
- 1946: The Invisible Informer – (composer: music score)
- 1946: Red River Renegades – (composer: music score)
- 1946: The El Paso Kid – (composer: music score)
- 1946: Rainbow Over Texas – (composer: additional music)
- 1946: King of the Forest Rangers – (composer: music score)
- 1946: Home on the Range – (composer: music score)
- 1946: Alias Billy the Kid – (composer: music score)
- 1946: The Undercover Woman – (composer: music score)
- 1946: Murder in the Music Hall – (orchestration)
- 1946: Days of Buffalo Bill – (composer: music score)
- 1946: The Phantom Rider – (composer: music score)
- 1946: Gay Blades – (composer: additional music)
- 1945: The Bells of St. Mary's – (additional music score)
- 1945: The Cherokee Flash – (composer: music score)
- 1945: Dakota – (composer: additional music)
- 1945: Mexicana – (orchestration)
- 1945: Colorado Pioneers – (composer: music score)
- 1945: Rough Riders of Cheyenne – (composer: music score)
- 1945: Don't Fence Me In – (composer: additional music)
- 1945: Sunset in El Dorado – (composer: additional orchestration; additional music)
- 1945: Along the Navajo Trail – (composer: music score)
- 1945: Love, Honor and Goodbye – (orchestration)
- 1945: The Fatal Witness – (composer: music score)
- 1945: Phantom of the Plains – (composer: music score)
- 1945: The Purple Monster Strikes – (composer: music score)
- 1945: Hitchhike to Happiness – (orchestration)
- 1945: The Cheaters (additional orchestration)
- 1945: Road to Alcatraz – (composer: music score)
- 1945: Federal Operator 99 – (composer: music score)
- 1945: Gangs of the Waterfront – (composer: music score)
- 1945: Man from Oklahoma – (composer: music score)
- 1945: Bells of Rosarita – (composer: additional music)
- 1945: Santa Fe Saddlemates – (composer: music score)
- 1945: Flame of Barbary Coast – (composer: additional music)
- 1945: Earl Carroll Vanities – (orchestration)
- 1945: Manhunt of Mystery Island – (composer: music score)
- 1945: Sheriff of Cimarron – (composer: music score)
- 1945: Great Stagecoach Robbery – (composer: music score)
- 1945: Girls of the Big House – (music score)
- 1944: Firebrands of Arizona – (musical director)
- 1944: San Fernando Valley – (composer: music score)
- 1944: Song of Nevada – (composer: music score)
- 1944: Three Little Sisters – (composer: additional music-orchestration)
- 1944: Atlantic City – (orchestration)
- 1944: Silver City Kid – (musical director)
- 1944: Call of the Rockies – (musical director)
- 1944: Marshal of Reno – (musical director)
- 1944: The Yellow Rose of Texas – (composer: additional music-orchestration)
- 1944: Man from Frisco – (orchestration)
- 1944: Cowboy and the Senorita – (orchestration)
- 1944: Jamboree – (orchestration)
- 1944: The Lady and the Monster – (orchestration)
- 1944: Rosie the Riveter – (orchestration)
- 1944: Call of the South Seas – (composer: additional music-orchestration)
- 1944: My Best Gal – (orchestration)
- 1944: Casanova in Burlesque – (composer: additional music-orchestration)
- 1944: The Fighting Seabees – (orchestration)
- 1944: Hands Across the Border – (composer: additional music-orchestration)
- 1944: Haunted Harbor – (music score)
- 1944: The San Antonio Kid – (musical director)
- 1944: Tucson Raiders – (musical director)
- 1944: Vigilantes of Dodge City – (musical director)
- 1944: Marshal of Reno – (musical director)
- 1943: In Old Oklahoma – (composer: additional music-orchestration)
- 1943: Sleepy Lagoon – (orchestration)
- 1943: Thumbs Up – (orchestration)
