= Tex Terry =

American actor (1902–1985)

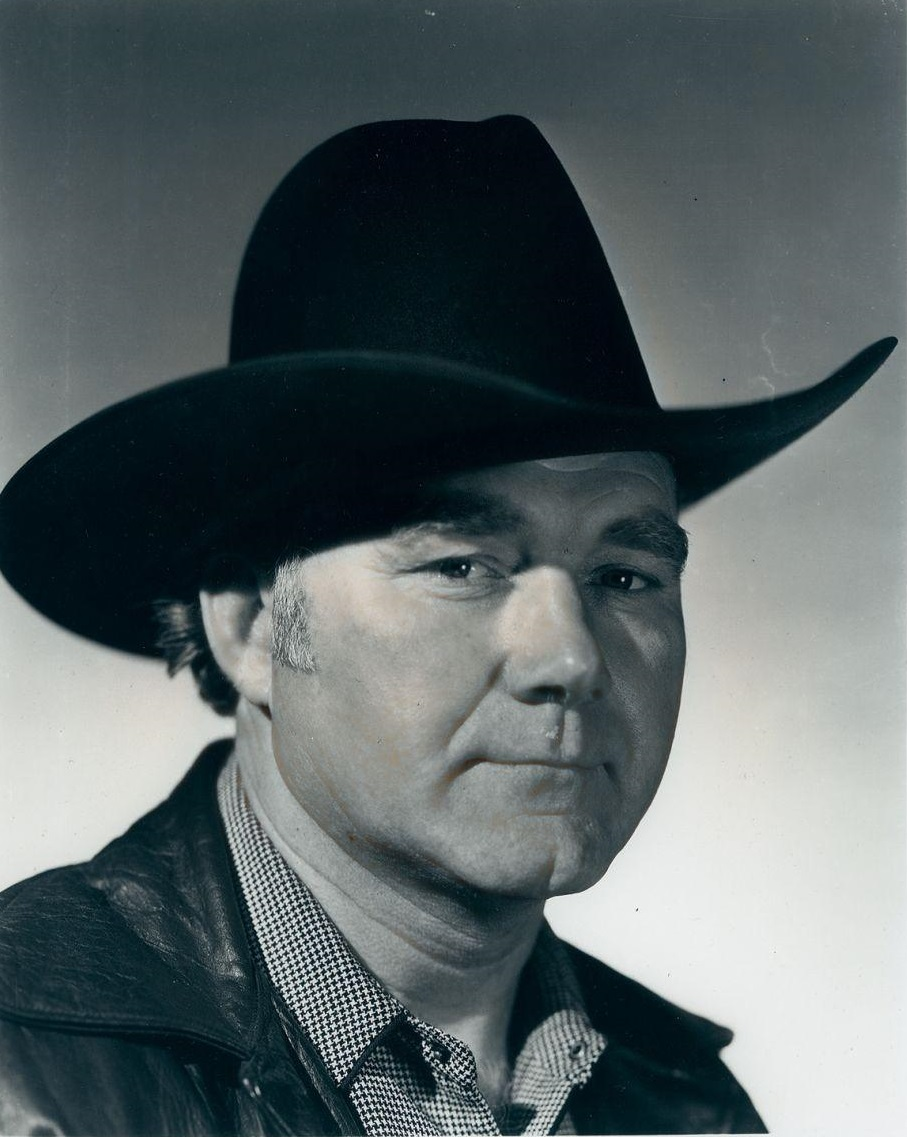
- Born: Edward Earl Terry; August 22, 1902; Coxville, Indiana
- Died: May 18, 1985 (aged 82); Terre Haute, Indiana
- Resting place: Coxville Cemetery, Coxville, Indiana
- Occupations: film and television actor
- Spouse: Isabel Draesemer Terry

Edward Earl Terry (August 22, 1902 – May 18, 1985), known professionally as Tex Terry, was an American film actor who often played a henchman in B-movie Westerns during the 1940s and 1950s.

== Biography ==
Terry was born in Coxville, Indiana. In 1964, he married Isabel Draesemer, a Hollywood agent. Terry made his last movie in 1972. In 1979, he and his wife moved back to Indiana, where he opened Tex's Longhorn Tavern. Every August he invited the public to celebrate his birthday by listening to him tell Hollywood stories and watching his movies.

He died in Terre Haute, Indiana on May 18, 1985, and is buried at Coxville Cemetery in Coxville, Indiana.

== Filmography ==
Year	Film	Role	Other notes
1939	Rovin' Tumbleweeds	Rancher	(uncredited)
1940	Heroes of the Saddle	Rancher	(uncredited)
1940	Boss of Bullion City	Cowboy	(uncredited)
1940	Pioneers of the West	Settler	(uncredited)
1940	Covered Wagon Trails	Henchman with Fletcher	
1941	Kansas Cyclone		(uncredited)
1941	Sunset in Wyoming	Bit Role	(uncredited)
1941	Rawhide Rangers	Ranger	(uncredited)
1942	Stardust on the Sage	Rancher	(uncredited)
1942	Bells of Capistrano	Roustabout	(uncredited)
1942	Outlaws of Pine Ridge		(uncredited)
1942	Valley of Hunted Men	Posse Member	(uncredited)
1944	The San Antonio Kid	Barfly	(uncredited)
1944	Firebrands of Arizona	Henchman	(uncredited)
1945	The Topeka Terror	Henchman	(uncredited)
1945	Man from Oklahoma	Horse Wrangler	(uncredited)
1945	Oregon Trail	Moyer	(uncredited)
1945	Bandits of the Badlands	Ranger Blackie	
1945	Along the Navajo Trail	Blacksmith	(uncredited)
1945	Sunset in El Dorado	Henchman with broken wagon	(uncredited)
1945	Rough Riders of Cheyenne	Flapjack, Carson Cowhand	
1946	Roaring Rangers	Barfly (uncredited)	aka False Hero
1946	Alias Billy the Kid	Buckskin	
1946	The El Paso Kid	Henchman Kramer	
1946	Red River Renegades	Bartender	(uncredited)
1946	Rio Grande Raiders	Stage Guard Mac McLane	
1946	Plainsman and the Lady	Deputy (uncredited)	aka Drumbeats Over Wyoming (USA: reissue title)
1946	Sioux City Sue	Jim Bailey, Rustler	(uncredited)
1946	Heldorado	Cowhand (uncredited)	aka Helldorado
1947	Son of Zorro	Cattleman	(uncredited)
1947	Last Frontier Uprising	Henchman that starts fire	(uncredited)
1947	Apache Rose	Henchman	
1947	Twilight on the Rio Grande	Henchman Joe	
1947	Wyoming	Morrison	(uncredited)
1947	Jesse James Rides Again	Blair, Phony Messenger [Ch. 11]	(uncredited)
1948	The Gallant Legion	Sgt. Clint Mason	
1948	Return of the Bad Men	Deputy (uncredited)	aka Return of the Badmen (International: English title)
1948	The Plunderers	Rancher	(uncredited)
1949	The Last Bandit	Pete	(uncredited)
1949	Brimstone	Dutch, Shotgun Guard	(uncredited)
1950	Stars in My Crown	Townsman	(uncredited)
1950	Rock Island Trail	McIntyre (uncredited)	aka Transcontinent Express (UK)
1950	Trigger, Jr.	Rancher	(uncredited)
1950	Beyond the Purple Hills	Barfly	(uncredited)
1950	Frisco Tornado	Henchman	(uncredited)
1950	Surrender	Stage Guard	
1950	California Passage	Bill	(uncredited)
1951	Oh! Susanna	Bartender	(uncredited)
1951	Heart of the Rockies	Henchman	(uncredited)
1951	Don Daredevil Rides Again	Townsman	(uncredited)
1951	Fighting Coast Guard	Master Sergeant (uncredited)	aka Fighting U.S. Coast Guard
1952	The Old West		(uncredited)
1952	Colorado Sundown		(uncredited)
1952	Thundering Caravans	Rogers	
1953	Pack Train	Pete, bearded pack train traitor	(uncredited)
1953	Sweethearts on Parade	Zebe	aka Sweetheart Time (USA)
1954	Rails Into Laramie	Bit (uncredited)	aka Fort Laramie, a.k.a. Rails End at Laramie
1954	Jubilee Trail	Penrose	(uncredited)
1954	Man with the Steel Whip	Barfly	(uncredited)
1955	Timberjack	Charlie	
1955	The Road to Denver	Mr. McGovern	
1957	The Parson and the Outlaw	Townsman (uncredited)	aka Return of the Outlaw, a.k.a. The Killer and 21 Men
1958	Toughest Gun in Tombstone	Stage Driver	(uncredited)
1958	The Happy Tree	Outlaw	
1959	The Oregon Trail	Brizzard	
1961	Posse from Hell	Townsman	(uncredited)

== Television credits ==
Year	Program	Episode	Role	Notes
1953	Death Valley Days	"Swamper Ike"	Sheriff	Season 1, Episode 12
1954	The Gene Autry Show	"Outlaw of Blue Mesa"	Sage, Bearded Deputy-Henchman	aka Melody Ranch
1954	The Gene Autry Show	"The Sharpshooter"	Sage, Bearded Deputy-Henchman	aka Melody Ranch
1957	Tales of Wells Fargo	"Barbara Coast"		
1958	Gunsmoke	"Robber Bridegroom"	Pete	aka Gun Law (UK), a.k.a. Marshal Dillon (rerun title)
1959	Have Gun - Will Travel	"Juliet"	Stage Driver	
1959	Have Gun - Will Travel	"Lady on the Stagecoach"	Stage Driver	
