= Rio Grande Raiders =

1946 film by Thomas Carr

- Theatrical release poster
- Directed by: Thomas Carr
- Screenplay by: Norton S. Parker
- Story by: Norman S. Hall
- Produced by: Bennett Cohen
- Starring: Sunset Carson; Linda Stirling; Bob Steele; Tom London; Tristram Coffin; Edmund Cobb
- Cinematography: Alfred S. Keller
- Edited by: William P. Thompson
- Production company: Republic Pictures
- Distributed by: Republic Pictures
- Release date: September 9, 1946
- Running time: 56 minutes
- Country: United States
- Language: English

Rio Grande Raiders is a 1946 American Western film directed by Thomas Carr and written by Norton S. Parker. The film stars Sunset Carson, Linda Stirling, Bob Steele, Tom London, Tristram Coffin and Edmund Cobb. It was released on September 9, 1946 by Republic Pictures.

== Cast ==
- Sunset Carson as Sunset Carson
- Linda Stirling as Nancy Harding
- Bob Steele as Jeff Carson
- Tom London as Sheriff Tom Hammon
- Tristram Coffin as Marc Redmond
- Edmund Cobb as Frank Harding
- Jack O'Shea as Henchman Ramsey
- Tex Terry as Mac McLane
- Kenne Duncan as Henchman Steve
