= Bandits of the Badlands =

1945 film by Thomas Carr

- Theatrical release poster
- Directed by: Thomas Carr
- Screenplay by: Doris Schroeder
- Produced by: Bennett Cohen
- Starring: Sunset Carson; Peggy Stewart; Si Jenks; John Merton; Forrest Taylor; Wade Crosby
- Cinematography: Bud Thackery
- Edited by: Arthur Roberts
- Production company: Republic Pictures
- Distributed by: Republic Pictures
- Release date: September 14, 1945
- Running time: 55 minutes
- Country: United States
- Language: English

Bandits of the Badlands is a 1945 American Western film directed by Thomas Carr and written by Doris Schroeder. The film stars Sunset Carson, Peggy Stewart, Si Jenks, John Merton, Forrest Taylor and Wade Crosby. The film was released on September 14, 1945, by Republic Pictures.

== Plot ==
Sunset Carson is in a posse of Rangers that pursues a gang of cattle rustlers led by the McKinnon brothers. The rangers badly wound Ed McKinnon, and the badmen stop the stagecoach into town to get help for Ed. Steve Carson, a newly graduated medical doctor and younger brother of Sunset, is on the stage. Not knowing how the man was injured, Steve offers to help and also naively imparts that he is Ranger Sunset's brother. As Steve applies his medical knowledge to save Ed MicKinnon, but is unsuccessful. When Ed MicKinnon dies, Cort murders Steve, and puts the dead Steve's body back on the stage with a note: "brother for brother."

With this lead, Sunset declares his intention to take revenge for his brother's killing rather than bring the killer to justice.

== Cast ==
- Sunset Carson as Sunset Carson
- Peggy Stewart as Hallie Wayne
- Si Jenks as Banty Jones
- John Merton as Cort McKinnon
- Forrest Taylor as Pop Wayne
- Wade Crosby as Burl Kohler
- Jack Ingram as Ed McKinnon
- Monte Hale as Dr. Steve Carson
- Fred Graham as Henchman Duke Lee
- Alan Ward as Captain Burke
- Robert J. Wilke as Henchman Keller
- Tex Terry as Ranger Blackie
- Jack O'Shea as Ranger Red
