= Wade Crosby =

American actor (1905–1975)

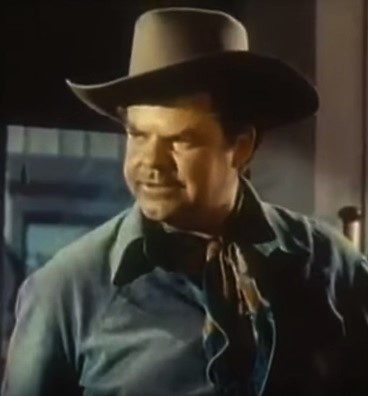
- Crosby in Under California Stars (1948)
- Born: August 22, 1905; Cedar Rapids, Iowa, U.S.
- Died: October 2, 1975 (aged 70); Newport Beach, California, U.S.
- Resting place: San Fernando Mission Cemetery
- Occupation: Actor
- Years active: 1941–1966

Wade Crosby (August 22, 1905 – October 2, 1975) was an actor in American films. He was also part of radio programs. He was in several Republic Pictures films.

== Personal life ==
Crosby died in 1975 at the age of 70 in Newport Beach, California and was buried in San Fernando Mission Cemetery.

== Filmography ==
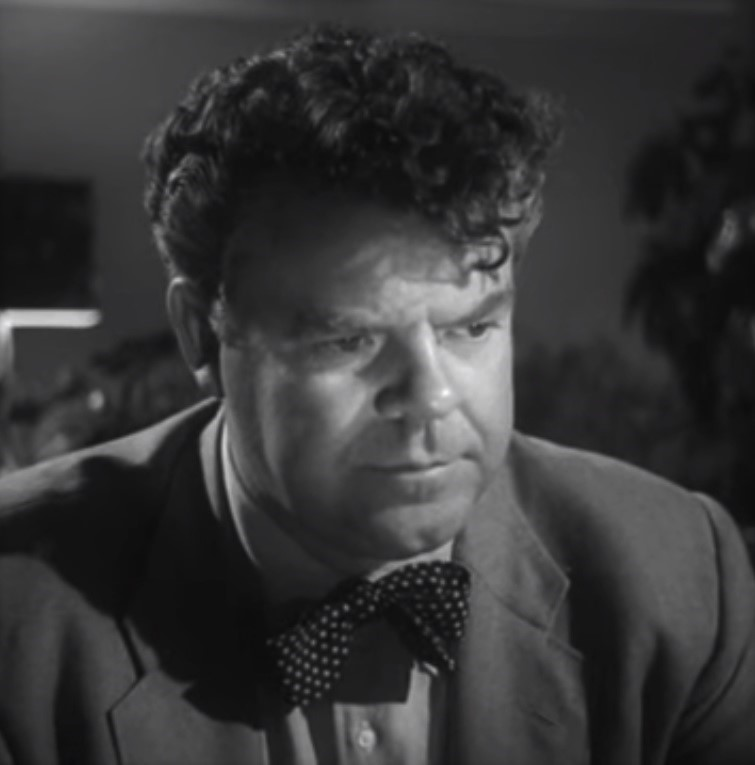
Wade Crosby in Invasion, U.S.A.

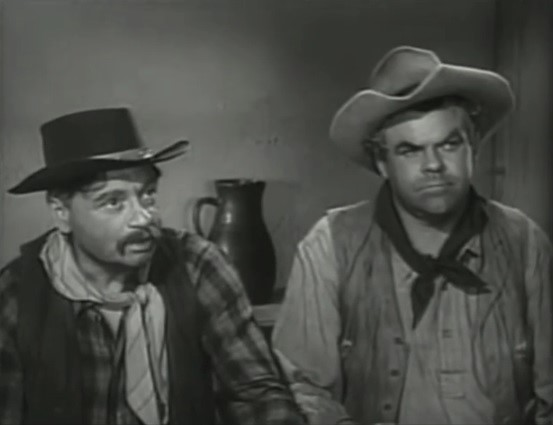
Lester Sharpe and Wade Crosby in The Lone Ranger

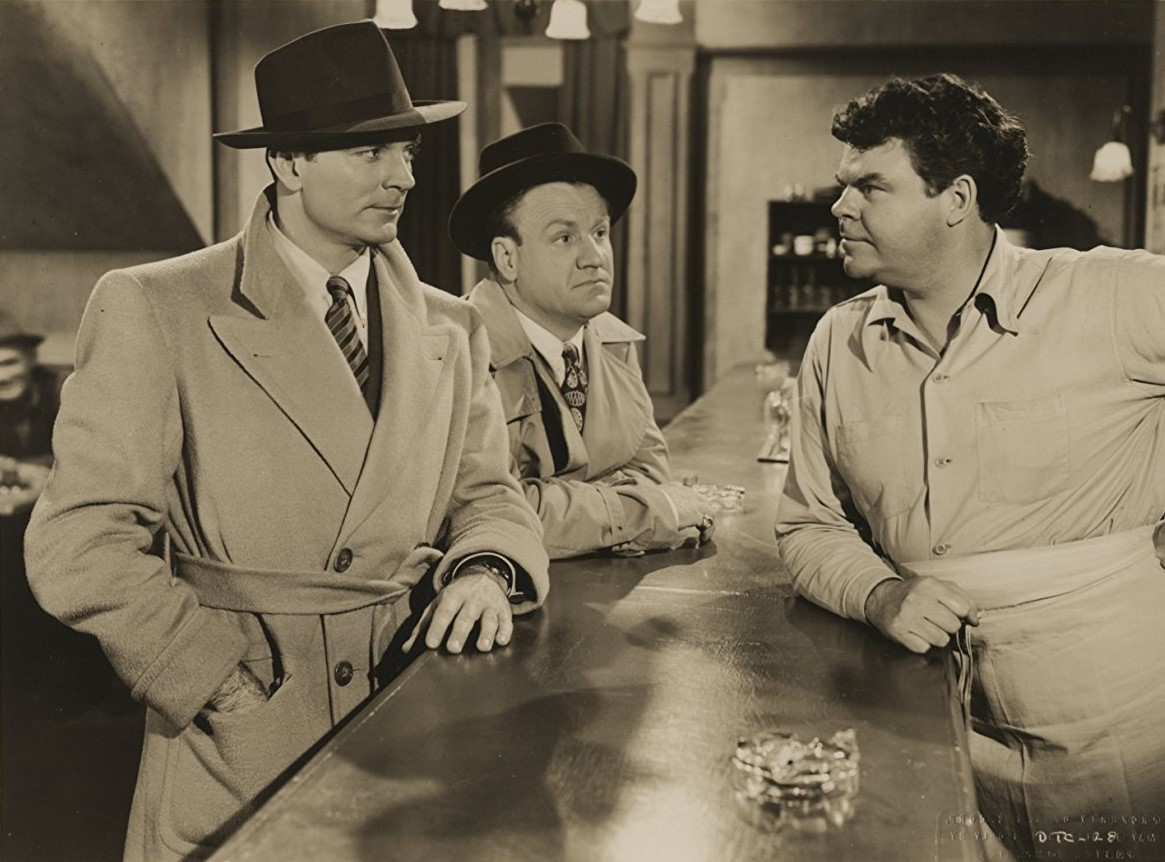
Wade Crosby on right with Ralph Byrd and Lyle Latell in Dick Tracy's Dilemma (1947)

- Ride a Crooked Mile (1938) as George Rotz
- Wagon Train (1940) as Wagonmaster O'Follard
- Sign of the Wolf (1941)
- Citadel of Crime (1941) as Rufe
- The Sundown Kid (1942)
- Shepherd of the Ozarks (1942) as Kirk
- The Woman of the Town (1943) as Crockett
- Headin' for God's Country (1943) as Jim Talbot
- Roaring Guns (1944)
- Cheyenne Wildcat (1944) as Henchman (uncredited)
- Rough Riders of Cheyenne (1945)
- Bandits of the Badlands (1945)
- Traffic in Crime (1946)
- Monkey Businessmen (1946), a Three Stooges short comedy film
- The Peanut Man (1947)
- Sinbad the Sailor (1947) as Soldier (uncredited)
- Along the Oregon Trail (1947) as Blacksmith Tom
- Under California Stars (1948) as Lige McFarland
- The Paleface as Jeb
- The Timber Trail (1948) as Henchman Walt
- Reign of Terror (1949) as Danton
- Rose of the Yukon (1949) as Alaskan
- Hit Parade of 1951 (1950) as Jake
- Tales of Robin Hood (1951) as Little John
- Invasion, U.S.A. as Illinois Congressman Arthur V. Harroway
- Rose of Cimarron (1952) as Henchman
- Old Overland Trail (1953)
- Prisoners of the Casbah (1953) as Yagoub
- Bandits of the West (1953) as Big Jim Foley
- J. W. Coop (1972) as Billy Sol Gibbs

== Radio ==
- Death Valley Days
- Frontier Town (1949) as Remington's sidekick, Cherokee O'Bannon

== Television ==
- Adventures of Wild Bill Hickok as Canfield (1951)
- Frontier Town
