= Peggy Stewart (actress) =

American actress (1923–2019)

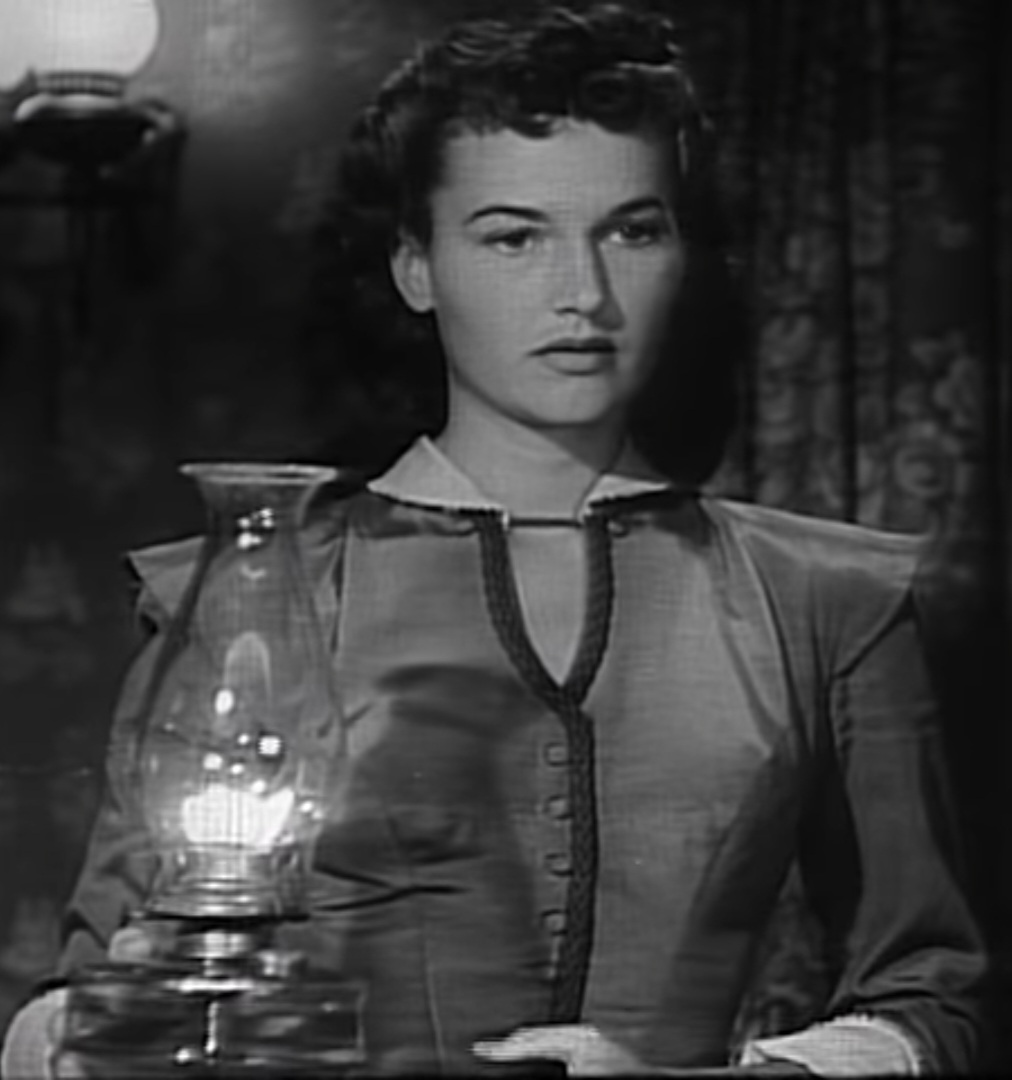
- Stewart in Stagecoach to Denver (1946)
- Born: Peggy O'Rourke; June 5, 1923; West Palm Beach, Florida, U.S.
- Died: May 29, 2019 (aged 95); Valencia, California, U.S.
- Occupation: Actress
- Years active: 1937–2014
- Spouses: Don "Red" Barry (m. 1940; div. 1944) Buck Young (m. 1953; died 2000)
- Children: 3

Peggy Stewart (born Peggy O'Rourke; June 5, 1923 – May 29, 2019) was an American actress known for her roles in Western B movies and television series. Her career in movies and television spanned 77 years, from 1937 to 2014.

== Early life ==
Stewart was born in West Palm Beach, Florida, where she was raised, the daughter of John Francis O'Rourke and Frances Velma (McCampbell) Splane, who were from Bessemer, Alabama. She distinguished herself as a swimming champion in high school; in the 1930s, her family moved to California, where she met character actor Henry O'Neill who recommended her to Paramount Pictures executives who were looking for a new actress for the part of Joel McCrea's teenage daughter in Wells Fargo (1937). Her work in the film led to numerous other film roles.

== Career ==
In April 1944, Stewart signed a contract with Republic Pictures and began starring in Western B movies opposite such actors as Allan Lane, Sunset Carson, and Wild Bill Elliott. During that time she played in several episodes of Adventures of Red Ryder. She usually played the part of the tough heroine, rather than a passive girl needing to be saved. From 1944 to 1951 she starred in 35 films, most of which were Westerns and film serials. She also starred with Gene Autry several times during that period. as well as appearing on several episodes of The Cisco Kid, including "Oil Land", which first aired on October 10, 1950.

In 1949, she played alongside Jim Bannon in Ride, Ryder, Ride. She again played the part of heroine to Bannon in 1949, starring in The Fighting Redhead. In 1952 she starred with Bill Elliott in Kansas Territory. In 1957, she had a minor role on CBS's Have Gun – Will Travel episode "The Outlaw". In 1958, she was cast as Etta Jackson, the romantic interest of the painter Hurley Abbott, played by Brad Johnson, in the episode "The Underdog" of the ABC/Desilu western series, The Life and Legend of Wyatt Earp, with Hugh O'Brian in the title role.

== Later years ==
Her career slowed in the 1960s, and by the 1970s she was residing in Studio City, California. Stewart won the Golden Boot Awards in 1984. Semi-retired, Stewart still continued to act on occasion. She played a minor part in a 1993 episode of Seinfeld titled "The Implant", in which she portrayed the aunt of George Costanza's girlfriend.

Stewart played Pam Beesly's grandmother, Mee-Maw, in a 2009 episode of The Office and reprised the role in a 2010 episode. In 2012, she played Grandma Delores in Adam Sandler's comedy film, That's My Boy.

== Personal life ==
In her latter decades, Stewart appeared regularly as a guest speaker at Western film festivals. From 1993 till her death, Stewart appeared as a special guest at the annual Lone Pine Film Festival.

Stewart was married twice. In 1940, aged 17, she married actor Don "Red" Barry; the marriage ended in divorce in 1944. They had a son, Michael, born on November 18, 1943. She was married to actor Buck Young from 1953 until his death on February 9, 2000. The couple had two children.

Her sister, Patricia Ann O'Rourke, was married to the actor Wayne Morris.

Stewart died in May 2019 at the age of 95.

== Filmography ==
=== Film ===
Year	Title	Role(s)	Notes
1937	Wells Fargo	Alice MacKay	
1938	White Banners	Sally's friend	Uncredited
1938	Little Tough Guy	Rita Belle	
1938	That Certain Age	Mary Lee	
1938	Little Tough Guys in Society	Jane	
1939	Man About Town	Mary, chorus girl	Uncredited
1939	5th Ave Girl	Katherine's girlfriend	Uncredited
1939	Everybody's Hobby	Bunny	
1940	Star Dust	College girl	Uncredited
1940	All This, and Heaven Too	Helen Lexington	
1941	Back Street	Freda Smith	
1942	Sleepytime Gal	Dancer	
1943	Girls in Chains	Terry, convict	Uncredited
1944	Tucson Raiders	Beth Rogers	
1944	Silver City Kid	Ruth Clayton	
1944	Stagecoach to Monterey	Jessie Wade	
1944	Cheyenne Wildcat	Betty Lou Hopkins	
1944	Code of the Prairie	Helen Matson	
1944	Firebrands of Arizona	Poppy Calhoun	
1944	Sheriff of Las Vegas	Ann Carter	
1945	Utah	Jackie	
1945	The Vampire's Ghost	Julia Vance	
1945	Oregon Trail	Jill Layton	
1945	Bandits of the Badlands	Hallie Wayne	
1945	Marshal of Laredo	Judy Bowers	
1945	Rough Riders of Cheyenne	Melinda Sterling	
1945	The Tiger Woman	Phyllis Carrington	
1946	The Phantom Rider	Doris Shannon	
1946	Days of Buffalo Bill	Molly Owens	
1946	California Gild Rush	Hazel Parker	
1946	Sheriff of Redwood Valley	Molly	
1946	Alias Billy the Kid	Ann Marshall	
1946	Red River Renegades	Julia Bennett	
1946	Conquest of Cheyenne	Cheyenne Jackson	
1946	The Invisible Informer	Rosalind Baylor	
1946	Stagecoach to Denver	'Beautiful', fake May Barnes	
1947	Son of Zorro	Kate Wells	
1947	Trail to San Antone	Kit Barlow	
1947	Vigilantes of Boomtown	Molly McVey	
1947	Rustlers of Devil's Canyon	Bess	
1947	Messenger of Peace	Evangeline Lockley	
1948	Tex Granger	Helen Kent	
1948	Dead Man's Gold	June Thornton	
1948	Frontier Revenge	Joan De Lysa	
1948	Ride, Ryder, Ride!	Libby Brooks	
1949	Desert Vigilante	Betty Long	
1949	The Fighting Redhead	Sheila O'Connor	
1950	Cody of the Pony Express	Linda Graham	
1951	Pride of Maryland	Christine Loomis	
1952	The Black Lash	Joan De Lysa	
1952	Kansas Territory	Kay Collins	
1952	Montana Incident	Clara Martin	
1961	When the Clock Strikes	Mrs. Pierce	
1961	Gun Street	Mrs. Knudson	
1961	The Clown and the Kid	Sister Grace	
1967	The Way West	Mrs. Turley	
1970	The Animals	Mrs. Emily Perkins	
1972	Pickup on 101	Car Family of Four	
1973	Terror in the Wax Museum	Second chairwoman	
1975	White House Madness	Rosemary Woods	
1976	Bobbie Jo and the Outlaw	Hattie Baker	
1977	Black Oak Conspiracy	Virginia Metcalf	
1979	The Fall of the House of Usher	Barmaid	
1980	Beyond Evil	Lady patient	
1981	The Boogens	Victoria Tusker	
2004	Big Chuck, Little Chuck	Liz	
2010	The Runaways	Grandma Oni	
2010	The Bang	Evelyn	Short film
2011	Dadgum, Texas	Pearl Ruth Anna 'MiMa' Magee	
2012	That's My Boy	Grandma Delores Spirou	Final film role

=== Partial Television Credits ===
Year	Title	Role	Notes
1950-1953	The Cisco Kid	various characters	5 episodes
1950	The Gene Autry Show	Ellie March	Episode: "The Peacemaker"
1951	The Adventures of Wild Bill Hickok	Jane	Episode: "Pony Express vs. Telegraph"
1952	The Roy Rogers Show	Eileen Barton/Myra Fuller	2 episodes
1952	Gang Busters	Violet Fairchild	Episode: "The Case of Willie Sutton, pt. 1"
1952	The Living Bible	Woman at the Tomb	Episode: "The Lord Is Risen"
1953	The Range Rider	Mrs. Brant	Episode: "The Black Terror" (uncredited)
1956	The Millionaire	Mary	Episode: "The Betty Perkins Story"
1957-1958	The Silent Service	First nurse/Sister Mary	
1957	Have Gun – Will Travel	Edna Raleigh	Episode: "The Brothers"
1958-1959	The Life and Legend of Wyatt Earp	Elsa Johnson/Etta Jackson	2 episodes
1959	Peter Gunn	Wilma Baxter	
1959	Yancy Derringer	Karen Ogilvie	
1959	Not for Hire	Nadine	
1959	Gunsmoke	Mrs. Phillips	Episode: "Fawn"
1960	National Velvet	Mrs. Anderson	
1960	Hotel de Paree	Martha Holcombe	
1960	Pony Express		
1961	Gunsmoke	Fran Hacker	Episode: "The Long, Long Trail"
1961	The Rebel	Sarah Wallace	
1961	Have Gun – Will Travel	Sarah Holt	Episode: "The Outlaw"
1961	The Americans	Mrs. Gilroy	Episode: "The Guerrillas"
1961	Lassie	Mrs. Johnson	Episode: "Lassie and the Greyhound"
1961	The Twilight Zone	Grace Stockton	Episode: "The Shelter"
1964	Gunsmoke	Daisy Huckaby	Episode: "The Promoter"
1964	The Fugitive	Mrs. Franklin	
1965	Daniel Boone	Ida Morgan	
1967	Hondo	Mrs. Malcolm	
1969	The Mod Squad	Mrs. Kane	
1970	Ironside	Mrs. Knudson	
1972	The Smith Family	Mrs. Dennison	Episode: "Off Duty Cop"
1972	Sarge	Mrs. Whitman	
1972	The Bold Ones: The New Doctors	Mrs. Norman	
1972	Mission Impossible	Screaming Woman	Episode: "TOD-5"
1973	The Stranger	Inner council member	TV movie (uncredited)
1974	Emergency!	Martha Felt/Claire Freeman	2 episodes
1975	Baretta	Teacher	
1980	Taxi	Buyer	
1980	Quincy, M.E.	Mrs. Ethel Sullivan	
1981	The Adventures of Nellie Bly	Mrs. Long	
1982-1983	Days of Our Lives	Rhoda "Sweetheart" Haynes	
1984	Trapper John, M.D.	Mrs. Rogers	Episode: "My Son the Doctor"
1984	The A-Team	Miriam Klein	Episode: "It's a Desert out There"
1985	Hollywood Beat	Judge	
1987	Werewolf	Evelyn Storm	Episode: "Blood Ties"
1993	Seinfeld	Aunt May	Episode: "The Implant"
1998	Buffy the Vampire Slayer	Ms Barton	Episode: "Band Candy"
1999	Beverly Hills, 90210	Mrs. Fike	Episode: "Baby, You Can Drive My Car"
2000	Charmed	Lilian	Episode: "Ex-Libris"
2000	The Norm Show	Myrtle	Episode: "Laurie Loses It"
2001	The Norm Show	Tippi	Episode: "Promblems"
2001	Popular	Old lady	Episode: ""
2001	Yes, Dear	Old lady	Episode: "Halloween"
2007	My Name Is Earl	Dotty Lake	Episode: "Buried Treasure"
2007-2008	The Riches	Cherien's mother	8 episodes
2008	NCIS	Elderly lady	Episode: "Collateral Damage"
2009	Weeds	Ingrid	Episode: "Su-Su-Sucio"
2009	FlashForward	Secretary	Episode: "Black Swan" (uncredited)
2009	Operating Instructions	Older lady	TV movie
2009-2010	The Office	Pam's Meemaw Sylvia	2 episodes
2010	Justified	Mrs. Inez Davis	Episode: "The Hammer"
2010	Community	Agnes	Episode: "Conspiracy Theories and Interior Design"
2014	Getting On	Mrs. Decker	Episode: "No Such Thing as Idealized Genitalia"
