= Golden Boot Awards =

American film and television award

The Golden Boot Awards were an American acknowledgement of achievement honoring actors, actresses, and crew members who made significant contributions to the genre of Westerns in television and film. The award was sponsored and presented by the Motion Picture & Television Fund. Money raised at the award banquet was used to help finance various services offered by the Fund to those in the entertainment industry.

Actor Pat Buttram conceived the idea of the Golden Boot Award, and they were presented annually from 1983 until being discontinued in 2007.

== Honorees ==
=== 1983, The 1st Annual Golden Boot Awards ===
- Rex Allen
- Dick Alexander
- Gene Autry
- Bruce Boxleitner
- Sunset Carson
- Eddie Dean
- Jack Elam
- Dale Evans
- Monte Hale
- Ben Johnson
- Lash LaRue
- Nat Levine
- Doug McClure
- Lee Majors
- Clayton Moore
- Slim Pickens
- Roy Rogers
- Charles Starrett
- Bob Steele
- Linda Stirling
- Forrest Tucker
- Lee Van Cleef
- Al Wyatt
- In Memoriam Award: Will Rogers

=== 1984, The 2nd Annual Golden Boot Awards ===
- Robert Blake
- Red Buttons
- Pat Buttram
- Yakima Canutt
- John Carradine
- Iron Eyes Cody
- Chuck Connors
- Buddy Ebsen
- Jennifer Holt
- Michael Landon
- Sam Peckinpah
- Denver Pyle
- Ella Raines
- Jane Russell
- Peggy Stewart
- Dennis Weaver
- Marie Windsor
- In Memoriam Award: Buck Jones

=== 1985, The 3rd Annual Golden Boot Awards ===
- Amanda Blake
- Ernest Borgnine
- Burt Kennedy
- Ricardo Montalbán
- Dale Robertson
- James Stewart
- Dub Taylor
- Robert J. Wilke
- Joe Yrigoyen
- Audie Murphy

=== 1986, The 4th Annual Golden Boot Awards ===
- James Arness
- Carroll Baker
- Carl Cotner
- Burl Ives
- Louis L'Amour
- Fred MacMurray
- Guy Madison
- Jock Mahoney
- George Montgomery
- Fess Parker
- Glenn Randall
- Cesar Romero
- In Memoriam Award: Tex Ritter

=== 1987, The 5th Annual Golden Boot Awards ===
- Gene Barry
- Harry Carey, Jr.
- André de Toth
- Richard Farnsworth
- Rhonda Fleming
- Glenn Ford
- Robert Livingston
- Joel McCrea
- Debra Paget
- John Russell
- Woody Strode
- In Memoriam Award: Tom Mix

=== 1988, The 6th Annual Golden Boot Awards ===
- Gene Evans
- Stuart Hamblen
- Virginia Mayo
- Willie Nelson
- Ann Rutherford
- Fred Scott
- George Sherman
- Morgan Woodward
- In Memoriam Award: William S. Hart
- In Memoriam Award: Andy Devine

=== 1989, The 7th Annual Golden Boot Awards ===
- Johnny Cash
- Ellen Corby
- Angie Dickinson
- Robert Duvall
- Robert Fuller
- John Ireland
- Dick Jones
- Paul Malvern
- Casey Tibbs

=== 1990, The 8th Annual Golden Boot Awards ===
- Noah Beery, Jr.
- Budd Boetticher
- Sam Elliott
- George Kennedy
- Hal Needham
- Burt Reynolds
- Katharine Ross
- In Memoriam Award: Jay Silverheels

=== 1991, The 9th Annual Golden Boot Awards ===
- John Agar
- Polly Burson
- Anthony Caruso
- Alice Faye
- Bob Hope
- Brian Keith
- Andrew V. McLaglen
- Hugh O'Brian
- Maureen O'Hara
- In Memoriam Award: Harry Carey

=== 1992, The 10th Annual Golden Boot Awards ===
- Rand Brooks
- Arthur Gardner
- Richard Jaeckel
- Katy Jurado
- Arnold Laven
- Jules Levy
- Pierce Lyden
- A. C. Lyles
- Ann Miller
- Montie Montana
- Ronald Reagan
- Tom Selleck
- Alice Van Springsteen
- John Sturges
- Henry Wills
- Sheb Wooley
- In Memoriam Award: Tim Holt

=== 1993, The 11th Annual Golden Boot Awards ===
- Chuck Courtney
- Clint Eastwood
- Jane Fonda
- Jack Palance
- Buck Taylor
- Ted Turner
- In Memoriam Award: William Boyd

=== 1994, The 12th Annual Golden Boot Awards ===
- Paul Brinegar
- Bill Catching
- James Coburn
- Gail Davis
- Joanne Dru
- Walter Hill
- Robert Mitchum
- In Memoriam Award: Pat Buttram

=== 1995, The 13th Annual Golden Boot Awards ===
- James Drury
- Andrew J. Fenady
- Bo Hopkins
- Bob Morgan
- Jane Seymour
- Claire Trevor
- In Memoriam Award: Burt Lancaster
- Founder's Award: Gene Autry

=== 1996, The 14th Annual Golden Boot Awards ===
- Carroll Baker
- Lloyd Bridges
- Charles Bronson
- Bill Campbell
- Joe Canutt
- Herb Jeffries
- In Memoriam Award: John Wayne
- Founder's Award: Roy Rogers

=== 1997, The 15th Annual Golden Boot Awards ===
- Leo Gordon
- Charles 'Chuck' Hayward
- Anne Jeffreys
- Karl Malden
- Robert Urich
- Clint Walker
- In Memoriam Award: Randolph Scott
- Founder's Award: John Ford

=== 1998, The 16th Annual Golden Boot Awards ===
- Adrian Booth Brian
- David Carradine
- Keith Carradine
- Robert Carradine
- Frankie Laine
- John Mantley
- Founder's Award: Clayton Moore
- Harry Morgan
- Dean Smith
- In Memoriam Award: Barbara Stanwyck
- Patrick Wayne

=== 1999, The 17th Annual Golden Boot Awards ===
- Julie Adams
- R. G. Armstrong
- David Dortort
- Kirk Douglas
- James Garner
- Jack Williams
- In Memoriam Award: DeForest Kelley
- Founder's Award: Mary Pickford Foundation and Charles 'Buddy' Rogers

=== 2000, The 18th Annual Golden Boot Awards ===
- Tom Berenger
- Melissa Gilbert
- Donna Hall
- L. Q. Jones
- Howard Koch
- Robert Stack
- Founder's Award: Dale Evans
- Backbone of the B's Award: Gregg Barton
- Backbone of the B's Award: Myron Healey
- Backbone of the B's Award: Walter Reed
- Backbone of the B's Award: House Peters, Jr.

=== 2001, The 19th Annual Golden Boot Awards ===
- Eli Wallach
- Barbara Hale
- Alex Cord
- Andrew Prine
- Loren Janes
- Chuck Norris
- Centennial Award: Clark Gable (presented to his son John Clark Gable)
- "Best of the West" Movie: Shanghai Noon

=== 2002, The 20th Annual Golden Boot Awards ===
- Bruce Dern
- Peter Fonda
- David Huddleston
- Whitey Hughes
- Ruta Lee
- Stuart Whitman
- Ron Soble
- Peter Brown
- Will Hutchins
- Robert Colbert
- Roy Huggins
- William T. Orr
- William Witney
- Earl Bellamy
- Ted Post
- Donna Martell
- Marion Shilling
- Ruth Terry
- Gloria Winters
- Marsha Hunt
- Honorary Golden Boot: Colt's Manufacturing Company

=== 2003, The 21st Annual Golden Boot Awards ===
- Tommy Lee Jones
- Chris Alcaide
- Graham Greene (actor)
- Tommy Farrell
- Terry Leonard
- Sue Ane Langdon
- Kris Kristofferson
- Michael Dante
- Kelo Henderson
- William Smith
- Charles Champlin
- Sons of the Pioneers
- "Best of the West" Movie: Tom Selleck for Monte Walsh

=== 2004, The 22nd Annual Golden Boot Awards ===
- Val Kilmer
- Scott Glenn
- Randy Quaid
- Robert Horton
- Pat Hingle
- Rob Word
- In Memoriam Award: Johnny Mack Brown
- Gale Storm
- Noel Neill
- Lois Hall
- Elaine Riley
- Golden Voice of Radio Award: Fred Foy

=== 2005, The 23rd Annual Golden Boot Awards ===
- James Caan
- Debbie Reynolds
- Wilford Brimley
- Martha Crawford Cantarini, Stuntwoman
- Mark Harmon
- Phil Spangenberger
- Ben Cooper
- Encore Westerns Channel
- Founder's Award: Jim Rogers
- Kids of the West:
  - Gary Gray
  - Mickey Kuhn
  - Michael Chapin
  - Eilene Janssen
  - Johnny Crawford
  - Lee Aaker

=== 2006, The 24th Annual Golden Boot Awards ===
- Powers Boothe
- Ann-Margret
- Wes Studi
- Joan Leslie
- Leslie H. Martinson, Director
- Buddy Van Horn, Stunt Coordinator
- Special Tribute: George "Gabby" Hayes
- Founder's Award: Clint Eastwood

=== 2007, The 25th Annual Golden Boot Awards ===
- Caruth C. Byrd
- Lee Horsley
- Martin Kove
- Walt LaRue, Stuntman
- Viggo Mortensen
- Eva Marie Saint
- Champion Award: Jackie Autry, wife of Gene Autry
- Founder's Award: John Wayne
