= Sheriff of Cimarron =

1945 film by Yakima Canutt

- Theatrical release poster
- Directed by: Yakima Canutt
- Screenplay by: Bennett Cohen
- Produced by: Thomas Carr
- Starring: Sunset Carson; Linda Stirling; Olin Howland; Riley Hill; Jack Ingram; Tom London
- Cinematography: Bud Thackery
- Edited by: Tony Martinelli
- Production company: Republic Pictures
- Distributed by: Republic Pictures
- Release date: February 28, 1945
- Running time: 56 minutes
- Country: United States
- Language: English

Sheriff of Cimarron is a 1945 American Western film directed by Yakima Canutt, written by Bennett Cohen, and starring Sunset Carson, Linda Stirling, Olin Howland, Riley Hill, Jack Ingram and Tom London. It was released on February 28, 1945, by Republic Pictures.

== Cast ==
- Sunset Carson as Sunset Carson
- Linda Stirling as Helen Burton
- Olin Howland as Pinky Snyder
- Riley Hill as Ted Carson
- Jack Ingram as M'Cord
- Tom London as Frank Holden
- Jack Kirk as John Burton
- Robert J. Wilke as Henchman Dobie
- Jack O'Shea as Henchman Shad
- Ed Cassidy as Sheriff Sam Duncan
- George Chesebro as Mine Owner
- Sylvia Arslan as Girl Prankster
- Dickie Dillon as Boy Prankster
