= Code of the Prairie =

1944 film by Spencer Gordon Bennet

- Theatrical release poster
- Directed by: Spencer Gordon Bennet
- Screenplay by: Albert DeMond; Anthony Coldeway
- Story by: Albert DeMond
- Produced by: Louis Gray
- Starring: Smiley Burnette; Sunset Carson; Peggy Stewart; Weldon Heyburn; Tom Chatterton; Roy Barcroft
- Cinematography: Bud Thackery
- Edited by: Harry Keller
- Music by: Joseph Dubin
- Production company: Republic Pictures
- Distributed by: Republic Pictures
- Release date: October 6, 1944
- Running time: 56 minutes
- Country: United States
- Language: English

Code of the Prairie is a 1944 American Western film directed by Spencer Gordon Bennet and written by Albert DeMond and Anthony Coldeway. The film stars Smiley Burnette, Sunset Carson, Peggy Stewart, Weldon Heyburn, Tom Chatterton and Roy Barcroft. The film was released on October 6, 1944, by Republic Pictures.

== Cast ==
- Smiley Burnette as Frog
- Sunset Carson as Sunset Carson
- Peggy Stewart as Helen Matson
- Weldon Heyburn as Jess Wyatt
- Tom Chatterton as Bat Matson
- Roy Barcroft as Professor Graham
- Bud Geary as Henchman Lem
- Tom London as Henchman Loomis
- Jack Kirk as Henchman Boggs
- Tom Steele as Henchman Burley

== See also ==
- List of American films of 1944
