= Oregon Trail (1945 film) =

1945 film directed by Thomas Carr

- Theatrical release poster
- Directed by: Thomas Carr
- Screenplay by: Betty Burbridge
- Based on: Gunsight; 1942 novel by Frank Gruber
- Produced by: Bennett Cohen
- Starring: Sunset Carson; Peggy Stewart; Frank Jaquet; John Merton; Mary Carr; Si Jenks
- Cinematography: Bud Thackery
- Edited by: Richard L. Van Enger
- Music by: Richard Cherwin
- Production company: Republic Pictures
- Distributed by: Republic Pictures
- Release date: July 14, 1945
- Running time: 55 minutes
- Country: United States
- Language: English

Oregon Trail is a 1945 American Western film directed by Thomas Carr and written by Betty Burbridge. The film stars Sunset Carson, Peggy Stewart, Frank Jaquet, John Merton, Mary Carr and Si Jenks. The film was released on July 14, 1945, by Republic Pictures.

== Plot ==
After the Harvey Dawson gang robs a Union Pacific train of fifty thousand dollars in gold bullion, railroad detective Sunset Carson goes undercover to infiltrate the gang. To help establish Sunset's cover as the outlaw Jim Parker, the Union Pacific's chief detective chases him off a train and through the streets of a small western town. Sunset's escape is abetted by the lovely Jill Layton (Peggy Stewart), who was amused by Sunset during the train ride.

== Cast ==
- Sunset Carson as Sunset Carson posing as Jim Parker
- Peggy Stewart as Jill Layton
- Frank Jaquet as George Layton
- John Merton as Dalt Higgins
- Mary Carr as Granny Layton
- Si Jenks as Andy Kline
- Bud Geary as Henchman Fletch Hobbs
- Kenne Duncan as Henchman Johnny Slade
- Steve Winston as Dick Pendleton
- Lee Shumway as Captain Street
- Earle Hodgins as Judge J. Frothingham Smythe
- Tom London as Sheriff Plenner
