= Days of Buffalo Bill =

1946 film by Thomas Carr

- Theatrical release poster
- Directed by: Thomas Carr
- Screenplay by: William Lively; Doris Schroeder
- Produced by: Bennett Cohen
- Starring: Sunset Carson; Peggy Stewart; Tom London; James Craven; Rex Lease; Edmund Cobb
- Cinematography: Alfred S. Keller
- Edited by: Tony Martinelli
- Production company: Republic Pictures
- Distributed by: Republic Pictures
- Release date: February 2, 1946
- Running time: 56 minutes
- Country: United States
- Language: English

Days of Buffalo Bill is a 1946 American Western film directed by Thomas Carr and written by William Lively and Doris Schroeder. The film stars Sunset Carson, Peggy Stewart, Tom London, James Craven, Rex Lease and Edmund Cobb. The film was released February 2, 1946, by Republic Pictures.

== Plot ==
Ace Diamond (James Craven) and Bill Clinker (Rex Lease) frame Sunset Carson (Sunset Carson) for the murder of a young rancher, Jim Owens (Jay Kirby as Jay Kirby). Sunset and his sidekick, Banty McCade (Tom London) escape and ride to the Owen's ranch to aid Jim's sister Molly (Peggy Stewart) in her fight to hold the ranch from being taken over by town banker Jacob Lewis (Edmund Cobb), secretly in cahoots with Diamond; both men are aware that an assay report indicates there is gold on the Owens property.

== Cast ==
- Sunset Carson as Sunset Carson
- Peggy Stewart as Molly Owens
- Tom London as Banty McCabe
- James Craven as Ace Diamond
- Rex Lease as Bill Clinker
- Edmund Cobb as Banker Jacob Lewis
- Eddie Parker as Henchman Chuck Barton
- Michael Sloane as Ranch hand Cam
- Jay Kirby as Jim Owens
- George Chesebro as Sheriff Grant
- Ed Cassidy as Trail's End sheriff
- Frank O'Connor as Cashier Sam
