= Santa Fe Saddlemates =

1945 film by Thomas Carr

- Theatrical release poster
- Directed by: Thomas Carr
- Screenplay by: Bennett Cohen
- Produced by: Thomas Carr
- Starring: Sunset Carson; Linda Stirling; Olin Howland; Roy Barcroft; Bud Geary; Kenne Duncan
- Cinematography: William Bradford
- Edited by: Ralph Dixon
- Production company: Republic Pictures
- Distributed by: Republic Pictures
- Release date: June 2, 1945
- Running time: 58 minutes
- Country: United States
- Language: English

Santa Fe Saddlemates is a 1945 American Western film directed by Thomas Carr and written by Bennett Cohen. Starring Sunset Carson, Linda Stirling, Olin Howland, Roy Barcroft, Bud Geary and Kenne Duncan, it was released on June 2, 1945, by Republic Pictures.

== Cast ==
- Sunset Carson as Sunset Carson
- Linda Stirling as Ann Morton
- Olin Howland as Dead Eye
- Roy Barcroft as John Gant
- Bud Geary as Spur Brannon
- Kenne Duncan as Brazos Kane
- George Chesebro as Fred Loder
- Robert J. Wilke as Henchman Rawhide
- Henry Wills as Henchman Denver
- Forbes Murray as Inspector Burke
- Frank Jaquet as Governor L. Bradford Prince
- Johnny Carpenter as Henchman Mills
- Rex Lease as Smiley
