= Bordertown Trail =

1944 film by Lesley Selander

- Theatrical release poster
- Directed by: Lesley Selander
- Screenplay by: Robert Creighton Williams; Jesse Duffy
- Produced by: Louis Gray
- Starring: Smiley Burnette; Sunset Carson; Weldon Heyburn; Addison Richards; Francis McDonald; Jack Luden
- Cinematography: Ernest Miller
- Edited by: Charles Craft
- Music by: Joseph Dubin
- Production company: Republic Pictures
- Distributed by: Republic Pictures
- Release date: August 11, 1944
- Running time: 56 minutes
- Country: United States
- Language: English

Bordertown Trail is a 1944 American Western film directed by Lesley Selander and written by Robert Creighton Williams and Jesse Duffy. The film stars Smiley Burnette, Sunset Carson, Weldon Heyburn, Addison Richards, Francis McDonald and Jack Luden. The film was released on August 11, 1944, by Republic Pictures.

== Cast ==
- Smiley Burnette as Frog Millhouse
- Sunset Carson as Sunset Carson
- Weldon Heyburn as New Orleans
- Addison Richards as Fontaine
- Francis McDonald as Matthews
- Jack Luden as Lieutenant Victor Carson
- Ellen Lowe as Abigail
- Rex Lease as Sergeant Jenkins
- John James as Tom
- Jack Kirk as Henchman Hank
- Henry Wills as Henchman
- Cliff Parkinson as Henchman

== See also ==
- List of American films of 1944
