= Deadline (1948 film) =

1948 film

- Directed by: Oliver Drake
- Written by: Oliver Drake
- Produced by: Oliver Drake; Walt Maddox
- Starring: Sunset Carson; Al Terry; Pat Starling
- Cinematography: James S. Brown Jr.
- Edited by: Martin G. Cohn
- Music by: Frank Sanucci
- Production company: Yucca Pictures
- Distributed by: Astor Pictures
- Release date: March 12, 1948
- Running time: 57 minutes
- Country: United States
- Language: English

Deadline is a 1948 American Western film directed by Oliver Drake and starring Sunset Carson, Al Terry and Pat Starling.

== Cast ==
- Sunset Carson as Sunset Carson
- Al Terry as Tom Taylor
- Pat Starling as Martha Taylor
- Pat Gleason as Spade Gilbert
- Lee Roberts as Henchman Trigger
- Stephen Keyes as Grant Dawson
- Frank Ellis as Henry Blake
- Forrest Matthews as Henchman Pete Hawkins
- Bob Curtis as Joe, Doc's assistant
- Phil Arnold as Doc Snodgrass
- Joe Hiser as Shorty
- Don Gray as Don
- Buck Monroe as Henchman Bill
- Al Wyatt Sr. as Henchman Dale

== Bibliography ==
- Pitts, Michael R. Western Movies: A Guide to 5,105 Feature Films. McFarland, 2012.
