= Alice Van-Springsteen =

American stuntwoman and jockey

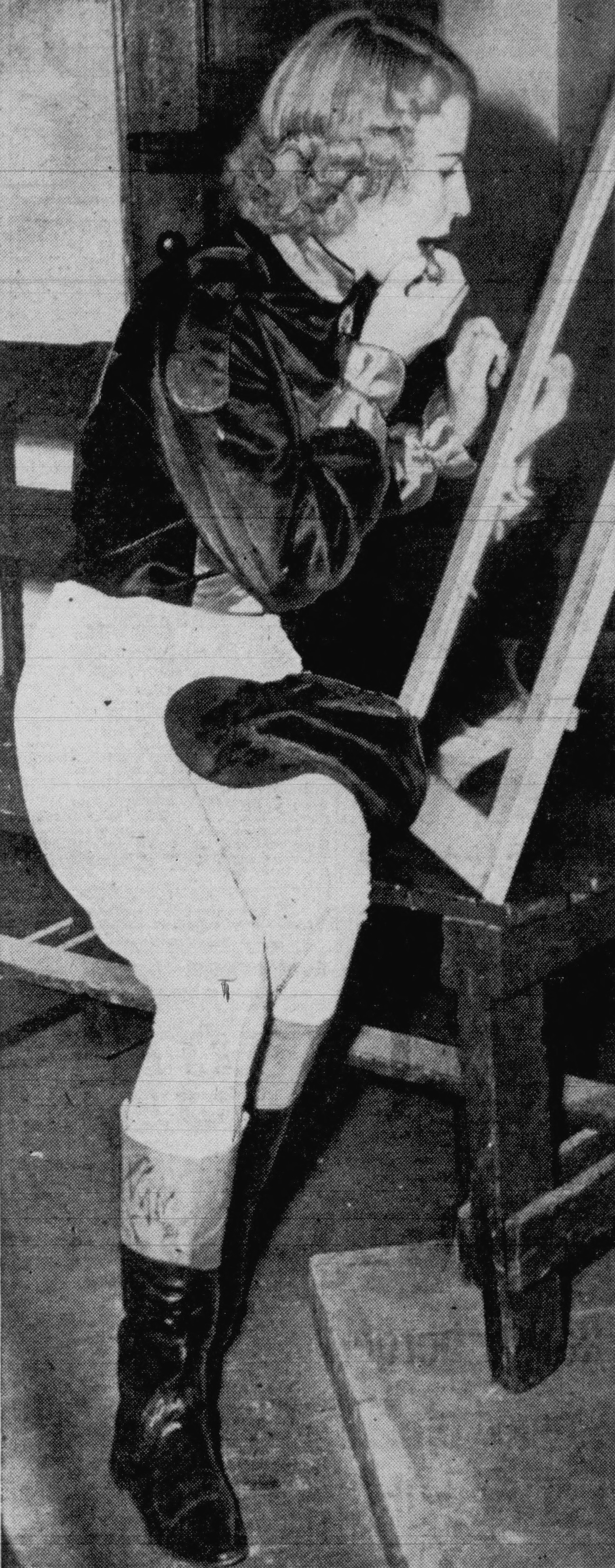
- Van-Springsteen, circa 1942
- Born: Alice Grace van der Veen; July 12, 1918; Arvada, Colorado, U.S.
- Died: September 13, 2008 (aged 90); San Diego, California, U.S.
- Occupations: Stuntwoman, jockey
- Spouse(s): Robert G. Springsteen (1960–1989; his death); 1 child

Alice Van-Springsteen (July 12, 1918 – September 13, 2008) was an American stuntwoman and jockey.

Born as Alice Grace van der Veen in Arvada, Colorado, she debuted in rodeo at the age of 13 in 1932 at the Los Angeles Coliseum.

== Career ==
A close friend of Dale Evans, she served as Evans' stunt double through most of her career. She was also a stunt double for Elizabeth Taylor in National Velvet. Other actresses for whom she stunt doubled on film or television include: Marion Davies, Barbara Stanwyck, Olivia de Havilland, Ingrid Bergman, Ann Sheridan, Ava Gardner, Bette Davis, Jane Wyman, Doris Day, Susan Hayward, and Linda Evans.

Her first film stunt work came in 1935 in Will Rogers' last film, In Old Kentucky. She had performed during the opening ceremony at the 1932 Summer Olympics in Los Angeles. She also rode as a jockey, becoming the third woman ever to receive a trainer's license for thoroughbred horses. In 1937, at 18, she was invited by the Queen to ride in the annual Royal Easter Show in Australia, where she was the only American in the show.

== Awards ==
She was presented one of the Golden Boot Awards in 1993 for her contributions to western cinema.

== Family ==
On August 12, 1960, she married film director Robert G. "Bud" Springsteen. The couple's only child, Norman Van Der Veen, died in 1993. She was widowed in 1989. Survived by grand daughter Darcy Van Der Veen and great grandson. (Name not disclosed) United States Army currently in service.

== Death ==
Van-Springsteen died of pneumonia on September 13, 2008, aged 90, at Point Loma Convalescent Hospital. She was survived by a granddaughter, Darcy Van Der Veen. Van-Springsteen was cremated and her ashes were interred at Sunset Hills Memorial Park, Apple Valley, California, where her long-time friends Roy Rogers and Dale Evans are buried.

== Links ==
- Alice Van-Springsteen at IMDb
- Profile, westernclippings.com
