= Alias Billy the Kid =

1946 film

- Theatrical release poster
- Directed by: Thomas Carr
- Screenplay by: Earle Snell; Betty Burbridge
- Story by: Norman Sheldon
- Produced by: Bennett Cohen
- Starring: Sunset Carson; Peggy Stewart; Tom London; Roy Barcroft; Russ Whiteman; Tom Chatterton
- Cinematography: Bud Thackery
- Edited by: Charles Craft
- Production company: Republic Pictures
- Distributed by: Republic Pictures
- Release date: April 17, 1946
- Running time: 56 minutes
- Country: United States
- Language: English

Alias Billy the Kid is a 1946 American Western film directed by Thomas Carr and written by Earle Snell and Betty Burbridge. The film stars Sunset Carson, Peggy Stewart, Tom London, Roy Barcroft, Russ Whiteman and Tom Chatterton. The film was released on April 17, 1946, by Republic Pictures.

== Plot ==
Texas Ranger Sunset Carson is given the mission of tracking down the notorious Marshall gang. Uncovering their hideout, he discovers the gang is led by Ann Marshall and is composed of three of her ranch-hands, Dakota, PeeWee and Buckskin. He soon learns, however, that they are in fact the innocent victims of a ring of swindlers and cattle rustlers led by the ruthless Matt Conroy.

== Cast ==
- Sunset Carson as Sunset Carson
- Peggy Stewart as Ann Marshall
- Tom London as Dakota
- Roy Barcroft as Matt Conroy
- Russ Whiteman as Peewee
- Tom Chatterton as Ed Pearson
- Tex Terry as Buckskin
- Pierce Lyden as Henchman Sam
- James Linn as Henchman Jack
- Stanley Price as Frank Pearson
- Ed Cassidy as Sheriff
