= Fighting Mustang =

1948 film

- Theatrical release poster
- Directed by: Oliver Drake
- Screenplay by: Rita Ross
- Produced by: Walt Maddox
- Starring: Sunset Carson; Al Terry; Pat Starling; Felice Richmond; Polly McKay; William Val
- Cinematography: Clark Ramsey
- Edited by: Ralph Dixon
- Music by: Frank Sanucci
- Production company: Yucca Pictures
- Distributed by: Astor Pictures
- Release date: February 20, 1948
- Running time: 56 minutes
- Country: United States
- Language: English

Fighting Mustang is a 1948 American Western film directed by Oliver Drake and written by Rita Ross. The film stars Sunset Carson, Al Terry, Pat Starling, Felice Richmond, Polly McKay and William Val. The film was released on February 20, 1948, by Astor Pictures.

== Cast ==
- Sunset Carson as Sunset Carson
- Al Terry as Jed Thomas
- Pat Starling as Helen Bennett
- Felice Richmond as Aunt Therese
- Polly McKay as Rita Bennett
- William Val as Tim Bennett
- Forrest Matthews as Captain J. C. McCloud
- Lee Roberts as Attorney General Clark
- Bob Curtis as Kelly
- Joe Hiser as Shorty
- Stephen Keyes as Bart Dawson
- Tex Wilson as Ace
- Al Ferguson as Hank
- Hugh Hooker as Warren
- Don Gray as Tex
- Dale Harrison as Montana
