= Frank Jaquet =

American actor (1885–1958)

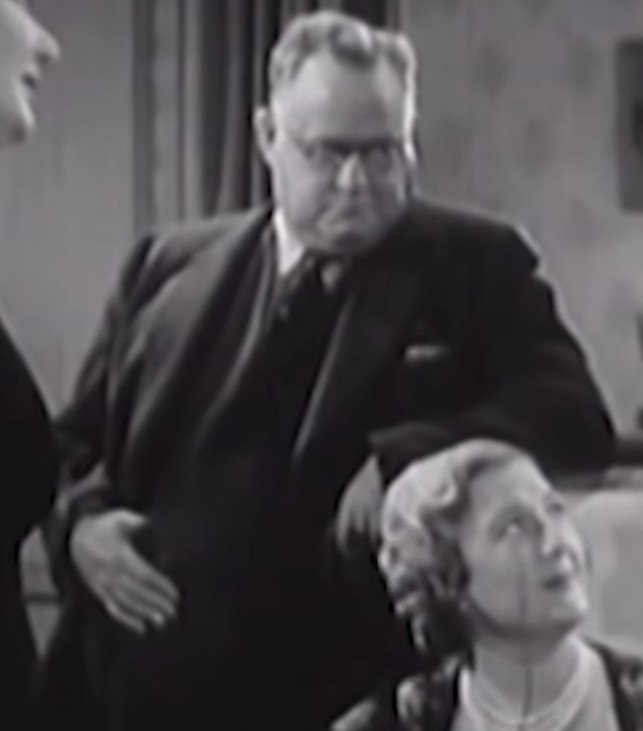
- Jaquet in Misbehaving Husbands (1940)
- Born: Frank Garnier Jaquet; March 16, 1885; Milwaukee, Wisconsin, U.S.
- Died: May 11, 1958 (aged 73); Los Angeles, California, U.S.
- Resting place: Hollywood Forever Cemetery
- Occupation: Actor
- Years active: 1934–1955

Frank Garnier Jaquet (March 16, 1885 – May 11, 1958) was an American actor known for playing supporting roles with his career extended from 1934 to the mid-1950s.

== Biography ==
Jaquet's father, Jules Jaquet, was the editor of the Milwaukee Journal Sentinel. He might have been expected to follow in that career path, but an event in 1902 changed his mind. Jaquet was working backstage on a People's Stock Company production in Milwaukee when an actor became sick and he was prompted to take a small part on stage. He said, "That turned my mind from newspapers forever to the stage". He acted with that company for several years before he traveled around the United States with a touring company in 1906-1907. He went on to act with other stock companies in addition to performing in vaudeville and with a medicine show.

In 1925, Jaquet was part of the Summer stock cast at the Elitch Theatre.

Jaquet's Broadway credits included When in Rome (1934), Alley Cat (1934), Ladies' Money (1934), Battleship Gertie (1935), Potash and Perlmutter (1935), Mulatto (1935), Iron Men (1936), Chalked Out (1937), and The Red Mill (1945).

In 1934, at age forty-nine, Jaquet made his film debut in the short War Is a Racket. Over the next twenty years, he appeared in over one hundred and forty films and TV episodes.

=== Personal life and death ===
Jaquet married Flo Garrison in Greenville, Georgia, in 1910. They had a son the next year, and Jaquet later learned that she had obtained a divorce. He said that she "wrote the boy was no more". In 1920 Jaquet married Lizibeth Gehrke in Ogden, Utah. Garrison died in an automobile accident in 1927. After both the son and the father thought the other was dead for more than two decades, the two were reunited on March 23, 1937, in New York. The catalyst for the meeting was H. Edward Haynes, head of a construction company in New York, who contacted the father by letter offering to provide the son's address. Haynes had married Garrison after her divorce from Jaquet, but he had been separated from his stepson almost 15 years. They had recently reunited, which led Haynes to initiate contact with Jaquet. The son, Robert, by that time was married and had a 14-month-old daughter.

Jaquet died on May 11, 1958, in Los Angeles of a heart attack at the age of 73. He is interred in Hollywood Forever Cemetery.

== Selected filmography ==
- Strange Faces (1938)
- Next Time I Marry (1938)
- The Story of Alexander Graham Bell (1939)
- They Shall Have Music (1939)
- Dust Be My Destiny (1939)
- Mr. Smith Goes to Washington (1939)
- A Dispatch from Reuters (1940)
- Misbehaving Husbands (1940)
- Back Street (1941)
- Federal Fugitives (1941)
- No Greater Sin (1941)
- Double Trouble (1941)
- In Old California (1942)
- Call of the Canyon (1942)
- Two Weeks to Live (1943)
- None Shall Escape (1944)
- Beneath Western Skies (1944)
- Call of the South Seas (1944)
- Call of the Rockies (1944)
- Silver City Kid, The Seventh Cross (1944)
- Black Magic (1944)
- Bowery Champs (1944)
- Grissly's Millions (1945)
- The Topeka Terror (1945)
- Beyond the Pecos (1945)
- Santa Fe Saddlemates (1945)
- A Bell for Adano (1945)
- Federal Operator 99 (1945)
- Oregon Trail (1945)
- Mr. Muggs Rides Again (1945)
- Colorado Pioneers (1945)
- The Cherokee Flash (1945)
- Prince of the Plains (1949)
- The Mutineers (1949)
- The Daring Caballero (1949)
- Barbary Pirate (1949)
- Mule Train (1950)
- Rock Island Trail (1950)
- Motor Patrol (1950)
- No Way Out (1950)
- Lonely Heart Bandits (1950)
- King of the Bullwhip (1950)
- Ace in the Hole (1951)
- Jungle Jim in the Forbidden Land (1952)
- Houdini (1953)
- Timberjack (1955)
