= Sunset Carson Rides Again =

1948 film by Oliver Drake

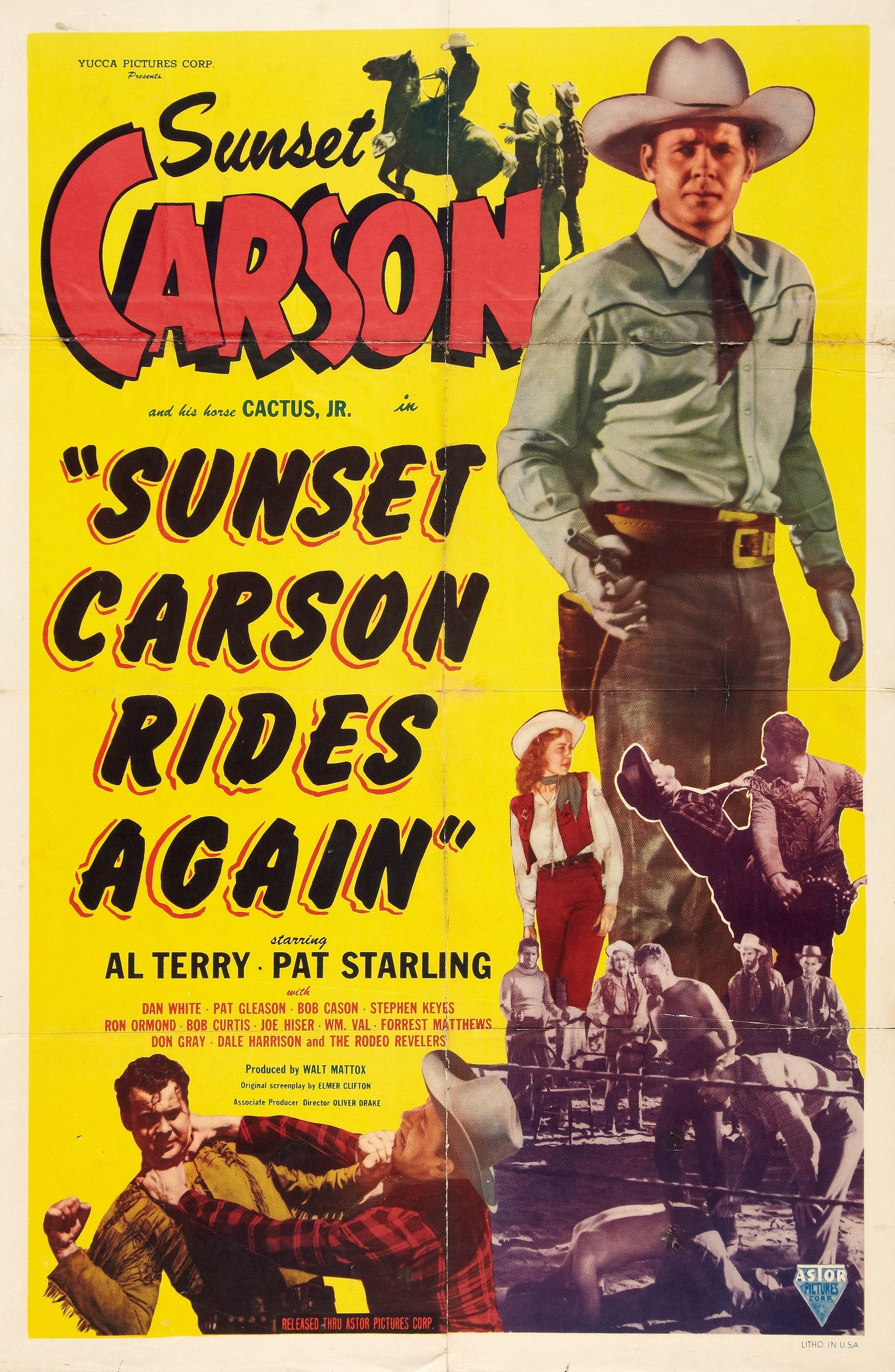
- Original 1948 movie poster.
- Directed by: Oliver Drake
- Written by: Elmer Clifton (original screenplay)
- Produced by: Oliver Drake (associate producer); Walt Maddox (producer)
- Starring: See below
- Cinematography: Clark Ramsey
- Edited by: Ralph Dixon
- Music by: Frank Sanucci
- Production company: Yucca Pictures
- Distributed by: Astor Pictures Corporation
- Release date: September 10, 1948
- Running time: 63 minutes
- Country: United States
- Language: English

Sunset Carson Rides Again is a 1948 American Western film produced and directed by Oliver Drake and shot on his own ranch. Filmed in 1947 in Kodachrome on 16mm film, the film was the first of Drake's Yucca Pictures Corporation to star Sunset Carson. The film was released by Astor Pictures Corporation in 35mm Cinecolor. The film follows Bob Ward as he is rescued by a man named Sunset Carson, who Bob believes murdered his father.

== Plot ==
In the desert foothills, rancher Sunset Carson finds a young Easterner who has drank from a poisoned spring, and takes him to his ranch, where his sister Joan looks after him. The young man introduces himself as the Kansas Kid, and explains that he jumped off a freight train thinking he was taking a short cut to a nearby town. The Kid informs Sunset that John Ward, a prospector Sunset knew, is dead. Unbeknownst to Sunset, the Kid is Ward's son, Bob, who carries a letter from his father which seems to implicate Sunset in his death. Sunset is unaware that Sam Webster, his partner in the ranch, is plotting against him. Later, Sunset fires one of Webster's cronies, Ralph Murdock, after breaking up a fight between Murdock and the Kid.

Sunset, who is on a committee to raise funds for a school building, promotes a boxing match between an itinerant fighter Slugger and his partner Webster, who used to be a boxer. When Sunset goes to the Cotton Wood rail depot to meet Slugger, however, he is told that Murdock has already picked him up in a buckboard. As Sunset catches up with them, Murdock hits Slugger on the hand with his pistol. Murdock jumps on a horse they have been leading along, and causes the buckboard horse to run wild by firing his gun. Sunset is eventually able to stop the buckboard, but Slugger's wrist is injured and his ability to fight is in jeopardy.

Meanwhile, the Kid is courting Joan and attempting to discover, without revealing his identity, why Sunset might have killed his father. Later, Webster whips Comanche, a horse he is trying to break, and attacks the Kid when he tells Webster to stop. Sunset and Slugger see the Kid punch Webster as they ride up. Slugger is impressed by the Kid's boxing ability and learns that he boxed in college. Sunset decides to substitute the Kid for Slugger in the match against Webster, and Slugger offers to help the Kid train. The fight, whose winner stands to become Comanche's owner, attracts a sizable crowd. However, as the Kid was weakened by poisoned water, concerns arise he may not be able to box for more than a few rounds. By the third round, the Kid has taken such a beating that Sunset concedes the match.

When Webster claims Comanche, the horse refuses to go with him, so the Kid rides Comanche back to the ranch. Sunset is presented with a satchel containing the cash raised at the fight and heads for the bank in town. When Webster suggests that Sunset may be absconding with the funds, the sheriff deputizes two ranch hands and goes after Sunset.

Meanwhile, the Kid, who has decided to return East, asks Joan to give his father's letter to Sunset and leaves on foot. Webster grabs the letter from Joan and takes her prisoner. However, she is able to send Comanche to find the Kid.

Three of Webster's men ambush Sunset and take the satchel. The sheriff finds Sunset but doesn't believe his account of being robbed, so Sunset draws a gun on him and rides off after Webster. As hoped, Comanche finds the Kid and they return to the ranch in time for the Kid to help Sunset in a gun battle.

After Webster escapes and is chased down by Sunset, the sheriff recovers the cash and also finds Ward's letter. Another letter, which the Kid has not opened, exonerates Sunset and implicates Webster and Murdock, who are then arrested. As Webster had stolen the money from Ward to buy a half interest in Sunset's ranch, Sunset makes the Kid his new partner.

== Cast ==
- Sunset Carson
- Al Terry as Bob Ward aka Kansas Kid
- Pat Starling as Joan Carson
- John L. Cason as Sam Webster
- Dan White as Sheriff Norton
- Pat Gleason as Referee Brown
- Stephen Keyes as Henchman Murdock
- Ron Ormond as Jim Pizor (Henchman)
- Bob Curtis as "Tin-Cup" Callahan
- Joe Hiser as "Shorty" McDuff
- Bill Vall as "Slugger" Appolodamus
- Forrest Matthews as Sam Nevens
- Don Gray as Henchman Rand
- Dale Harrison as Tomkins
- The Rodeo Revelers as Musicians
