= Olin Howland =

American actor (1886–1959)

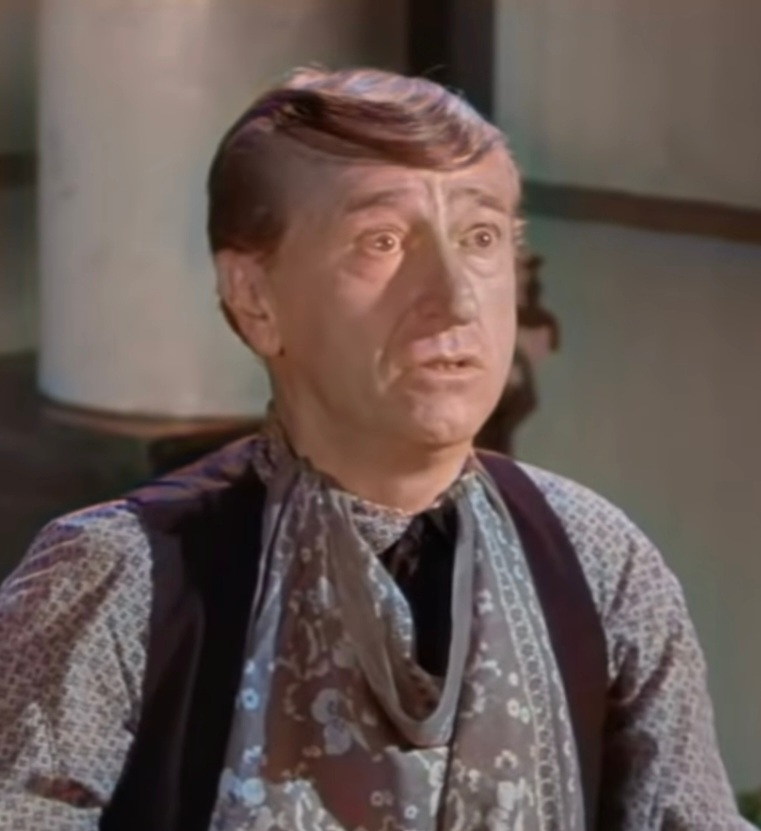
- Howland in Angel and the Badman (1947)
- Born: February 10, 1886; Denver, Colorado, U.S.
- Died: September 20, 1959 (aged 73); Hollywood, California, U.S.
- Occupation: Actor
- Years active: 1918–1959
- Relatives: Jobyna Howland (sister)

Olin Ross Howland (February 10, 1886 – September 20, 1959) was an American film and theatre actor.

== Life and career ==
Howland was born in Denver, Colorado, to Job "Joby" A. Howland and Mary A. Bunting. Howland’s father, Job, served during the Civil War as a musician in Company F of the 51st Indiana Infantry, mustering in on 14 December 1861, when he was twelve. His sister was stage actress Jobyna Howland.

From 1909 to 1927, Howland appeared on Broadway in musicals, occasionally performing in silent films. The musicals include Leave It to Jane (1917), Two Little Girls in Blue (1921) and Wildflower (1923). He was in the film Janice Meredith (1924) with Marion Davies. With the advent of sound films, his theatre background proved an asset, and he concentrated mostly on films thereafter, appearing in nearly two hundred movies between 1918 and 1958.

Howland often played eccentric and rural roles in Hollywood. His parts were often small and uncredited, and he never got a leading role. He was a personal favorite of David O. Selznick, who cast him in his movies Nothing Sacred (1937) as a strange luggage man, The Adventures of Tom Sawyer (1938) as the teacher Mr. Dobbins, Made for Each Other (1939) as the farmer, and Gone with the Wind (1939) as a carpetbagger businessman. He also played in numerous westerns from Republic Pictures, including the John Wayne films In Old California (1942) and Angel and the Badman (1947). As a young man, Howland learned to fly at the Wright Flying School and soloed on a Wright Model B. This lent special poignancy to his scenes with James Stewart in the film The Spirit of St. Louis (1957); Stewart was also a pilot in real life. The Spirit of St. Louis and Them! (1954), where he played a drunken old man, and The Blob (1958), as the first victim, were his last films.

He also played in television shows during the 1950s. One of Olin's memorable television appearances was in an episode of "I Love Lucy." Entitled "First Stop", air date January 17, 1955 Olin played the humorous role of a cafe and motel proprietor offering dubious accommodations to the road-weary Ricardos and Mertzes as they traveled by car en-route from New York to California. In 1958 and 1959, he was cast as Charley Perkins in five episodes of ABC's sitcom The Real McCoys, starring Walter Brennan.

Howland was also a dancer, a dancing teacher, and a headliner in vaudeville shows. He toured Europe performing dancing exhibitions.

Howland never married and had no children. He worked until his death in Hollywood, California, at the age of 73.

== Selected filmography ==
- Danse Macabre (1922) - Death
- The Great White Way (1924) - Stubbs
- Janice Meredith (1924) - Philemon Hennion
- Zander the Great (1925) - Elmer Lovejoy
- Over the Hill (1931) - Isaac as an Adult
- Cheaters at Play (1932) - Secretary
- So Big (1932) - Jacob Pogadunk (uncredited)
- Blondie Johnson (1933) - Eddie
- Golden Harvest (1933) - Wheat Farmer (uncredited)
- Little Women (1933) - Mr. Davis (uncredited)
- Private Scandal (1934) - Ed, Coroner
- Treasure Island (1934) - Pirate of the Spanish Main
- Wagon Wheels (1934) - Bill O'Leary
- Marie Galante (1934) - Clerk French Consul (uncredited)
- Behold My Wife (1934) - Mattingly (uncredited)
- Under Pressure (1935) - Newspaper Reporter (uncredited)
- Folies Bergère de Paris (1935) - Stage Manager
- Naughty Marietta (1935) - Minor Role (uncredited)
- The Case of the Curious Bride (1935) - Coroner Wilbur Strong
- Love Me Forever (1935) - Carlton - Interior Decorator (uncredited)
- Little Big Shot (1935) - Doc - Kells' Henchman (uncredited)
- The Case of the Lucky Legs (1935) - Dr. Croker
- Dr. Socrates (1935) - Bob Catlett
- The Widow from Monte Carlo (1935) - Eaves
- Man Hunt (1936) - Starrett
- Road Gang (1936) - Doctor
- Snowed Under (1936) - Bridgeport Sheriff (uncredited)
- I Married a Doctor (1936) - Dave Dyer
- The Big Noise (1936) - Harrison
- Satan Met a Lady (1936) - Detective Dunhill
- Earthworm Tractors (1936) - Mr. Blair
- The Case of the Velvet Claws (1936) - Wilbur Strong
- The Longest Night (1936) - Smythe, Floorwalker
- Love Letters of a Star (1936)
- Country Gentlemen (1936) - Lawyer
- Gold Diggers of 1937 (1936) - Dr. MacDuffy
- Men in Exile (1937) - H. Mortimer Jones
- A Star Is Born (1937) - Judd Baker (uncredited)
- Mountain Music (1937) - Pappy Burnside
- Marry the Girl (1937) - First Southerner
- Stella Dallas (1937) - Stephen's Office Clerk (uncredited)
- Wife, Doctor and Nurse (1937) - Doorman Jim
- Stand-In (1937) - Hotel Manager (uncredited)
- Nothing Sacred (1937) - Vermont Baggage Man
- The Bad Man of Brimstone (1937) - Jardge - Stage Driver (uncredited)
- Swing Your Lady (1938) - Hotel Proprietor
- The Adventures of Tom Sawyer (1938) - Mr. Dobbins - Schoolmaster
- Merrily We Live (1938) - Jed Smith (uncredited)
- The Girl of the Golden West (1938) - Trinidad Joe
- Mr. Moto's Gamble (1938) - Deputy Sheriff Burt (uncredited)
- A Trip to Paris (1938) - Fred (uncredited)
- Kentucky Moonshine (1938) - Tom Slack
- When Were You Born (1938) - Peter Finlay (Sagittarius)
- Little Tough Guy (1938) - Baxter
- The Mad Miss Manton (1938) - Mr. X
- Brother Rat (1938) - Slim
- Sweethearts (1938) - Appleby
- Ambush (1939) - Radio Actor (segment "Uncle Toby") (uncredited)
- Boy Slaves (1939) - 'Cookie' the Camp Cook (uncredited)
- Made for Each Other (1939) - Farmer (uncredited)
- Nancy Drew... Reporter (1939) - Police Sgt. Entwhistle
- Zenobia (1939) - Attorney Culpepper
- The Kid from Kokomo (1939) - Sam, the Whittler (uncredited)
- One Hour to Live (1939) - Clerk
- Blondie Brings Up Baby (1939) - Encyclopedia Salesman
- The Return of Doctor X (1939) - Undertaker
- Gone with the Wind (1939) - A carpetbagger businessman
- Days of Jesse James (1939) - Muncie Undersheriff
- Four Wives (1939) - Joe - a Policeman (uncredited)
- Young Tom Edison (1940) - Telegrapher (Indian Attack) (uncredited)
- The Doctor Takes a Wife (1940) - Hotel Clerk (uncredited)
- Comin' Round the Mountain (1940) - Pa Blower
- Young People (1940) - Station Master
- Chad Hanna (1940) - Cisco Tridd
- The Great Lie (1941) - Ed - Arizona Ranch Hand (scenes deleted)
- The Shepherd of the Hills (1941) - Corky
- Belle Starr (1941) - Jasper Trench
- One Foot in Heaven (1941) - Train Station Master (uncredited)
- Buy Me That Town (1941) - Constable Sam Smedley
- Ellery Queen and the Murder Ring (1941) - Dr. Williams
- Two-Faced Woman (1941) - Frank (uncredited)
- You're in the Army Now (1941) - Pa - The Farmer (uncredited)
- Mr. and Mrs. North (1942) - Minor Role (scenes deleted)
- Sappy Birthday (1942, Short) - Mr. Plantem, Cemetery Plot Salesman
- Blondie's Blessed Event (1942) - Office Worker (uncredited)
- This Gun for Hire (1942) - Blair Fletcher
- The Man Who Wouldn't Die (1942) - Chief of Police Jonathan Meek
- Home in Wyomin' (1942) - Sunrise
- Dr. Broadway (1942) - The Professor
- Almost Married (1942) - Bright
- In Old California (1942) - Salesman (uncredited)
- Ten Gentlemen from West Point (1942) - Carpenter (uncredited)
- Henry and Dizzy (1942) - Mr. Stevens
- Joan of Ozark (1942) - Game Warden (uncredited)
- Her Cardboard Lover (1942) - Frank - Casino Manager (uncredited)
- Orchestra Wives (1942) - Dance Ticket-Taker (uncredited)
- Mrs. Wiggs of the Cabbage Patch (1942) - Jacob Diezal (uncredited)
- You Can't Escape Forever (1942) - Cemetery Organist (uncredited)
- Secrets of the Underground (1942) - Oscar Mayberry
- When Johnny Comes Marching Home (1942) - Trullers
- Ridin' Down the Canyon (1942) - The Jailer
- Lady Bodyguard (1943) - Dr. Saunders
- Young and Willing (1943) - Second Cop
- The Falcon Strikes Back (1943) - Sheriff (uncredited)
- A Stranger in Town (1943) - Homer Todds
- Dixie (1943) - Mr. Deveraux
- The Sky's the Limit (1943) - Driver (uncredited)
- The Good Fellows (1943) - Reynolds
- The Falcon and the Co-eds (1943) - Goodwillie, Bluecliff Driver
- Jack London (1943) - Mailman (uncredited)
- Twilight on the Prairie (1944) - Jed
- Bermuda Mystery (1944) - Gas Station Owner
- The Adventures of Mark Twain (1944) - Riverboat Southerner (uncredited)
- Man from Frisco (1944) - Eben Whelock
- Goodnight, Sweetheart (1944) - Slim Taylor
- Allergic to Love (1944) - Sam Walker
- Sing, Neighbor, Sing (1944) - Joe the Barber
- In the Meantime, Darling (1944) - J.P. 'Hiram' Morehousse (uncredited)
- And Now Tomorrow (1944) - Customer (uncredited)
- I'll Be Seeing You (1944) - Train Vendor (uncredited)
- Nothing but Trouble (1944) - Painter's Foreman (uncredited)
- The Town Went Wild (1944) - Bit Part
- Can't Help Singing (1944) - Bigelow
- She Gets Her Man (1945) - Hank (uncredited)
- Grissly's Millions (1945) - Andrews (uncredited)
- Her Lucky Night (1945) - Prince de la Mour
- Sheriff of Cimarron (1945) - Pinky Snyder
- It's in the Bag! (1945) - Dr. Greengrass's Doctor (uncredited)
- Santa Fe Saddlemates (1945) - Dead Eye
- Captain Eddie (1945) - Census Taker
- Incendiary Blonde (1945) - Interior Decorator (uncredited)
- Senorita from the West (1945) - Justice of Peace
- Fallen Angel (1945) - Joe Ellis (uncredited)
- Sing Your Way Home (1945) - Zany Steward (uncredited)
- Dakota (1945) - Devlin's Driver
- Colonel Effingham's Raid (1946) - Painter (uncredited)
- She Wrote the Book (1946) - Baggage Master (uncredited)
- The Strange Love of Martha Ivers (1946) - Newspaper Clerk (uncredited)
- Home Sweet Homicide (1946) - Luke (uncredited)
- Three Wise Fools (1946) - Witness (uncredited)
- Crime Doctor's Man Hunt (1946) - Marcus Le Blaine (uncredited)
- Easy Come, Easy Go (1947) - Gas Man (uncredited)
- Angel and the Badman (1947) - Bradley
- Apache Rose (1947) - Alkali Elkins
- For the Love of Rusty (1947) - Frank Foley (uncredited)
- Living in a Big Way (1947) - The Morgan Gardener (uncredited)
- The Trouble with Women (1947) - Mr. Pink (uncredited)
- Keeper of the Bees (1947) - Customer
- Wyoming (1947) - Cowboy Wanting Herd (uncredited)
- The Fabulous Texan (1947) - McGinn - Storekeeper (uncredited)
- I Walk Alone (1947) - Ed the Watchman (uncredited)
- Relentless (1948) - Horse Doctor (uncredited)
- The Return of the Whistler (1948) - Jeff Anderson (uncredited)
- My Dog Rusty (1948) - Frank Foley (uncredited)
- The Dude Goes West (1948) - Finnegan
- Station West (1948) - Cook
- Isn't It Romantic? (1948) - Hotel Clerk (uncredited)
- Smoky Mountain Melody (1948) - Lum Peters
- The Paleface (1948) - Jonathan Sloane, undertaker
- Last of the Wild Horses (1948) - Remedy Williams
- Bad Men of Tombstone (1949) - Store Proprietor
- Little Women (1949) - Mr. Davis - Schoolteacher (uncredited)
- A Connecticut Yankee in King Arthur's Court (1949) - Sam, the Postman (uncredited)
- Grand Canyon (1949) - Windy
- Hellfire (1949) - Bartender (uncredited)
- Leave It to Henry (1949) - Milo Williams
- Anna Lucasta (1949) - Station Master (uncredited)
- Mr. Soft Touch (1949) - Skinny Santa Claus (uncredited)
- Top o' the Morning (1949) - Barfly (uncredited)
- The Nevadan (1950) - Rusty (uncredited)
- A Ticket to Tomahawk (1950) - Railway Conductor (uncredited)
- Rock Island Trail (1950) - Saloonkeeper
- Father Makes Good (1950) - Milo Williams
- Never a Dull Moment (1950) - Hunter (uncredited)
- He's a Cockeyed Wonder (1950) - Hotel Clerk (uncredited)
- Stage to Tucson (1950) - Chantry (uncredited)
- Charlie's Haunt (1950) - Storyteller on Bench
- Santa Fe (1951) - Dan Dugan
- Fighting Coast Guard (1951) - Desk Clerk
- The Fabulous Senorita (1952) - Justice of the Peace
- Gobs and Gals (1952) - Conductor
- So This Is Love (1953) - Mailman (uncredited)
- Them! (1954) - Jensen
- A Star is Born (1954) - Charley (uncredited)
- The McConnell Story (1955) - Sam - Postman (uncredited)
- The Storm Rider (1957) - Will Collins
- The Spirit of St. Louis (1957) - Surplus Dealer (uncredited)
- Bombers B-52 (1957) - Joe (uncredited)
- The Blob (1958) - Old Man
