= Rough Riders of Cheyenne =

1945 film by Thomas Carr

- Theatrical release poster
- Directed by: Thomas Carr
- Screenplay by: Elizabeth Beecher
- Produced by: Bennett Cohen
- Starring: Sunset Carson; Peggy Stewart; Mira McKinney; Monte Hale; Wade Crosby; Michael Sloane
- Cinematography: William Bradford
- Edited by: Fred Allen
- Production company: Republic Pictures
- Distributed by: Republic Pictures
- Release date: November 1, 1945
- Running time: 56 minutes
- Country: United States
- Language: English

Rough Riders of Cheyenne is a 1945 American Western film directed by Thomas Carr and written by Elizabeth Beecher. The film stars: Sunset Carson, Peggy Stewart, Mira McKinney, Monte Hale, Wade Crosby and Michael Sloane. The film was released on November 1, 1945, by Republic Pictures.

== Plot ==
A long simmering feud between the Carson and Sterling families erupts in western frontier town of Paradise Valley. Sunset Carson (played by the real-life Sunset Carson) hears that his father has been murdered by the Sterling family, and heads for his home town in Arizona, after having lived out of state for years. Along the journey home, he is attacked by an unidentified group of assailants. Carson survives the ambush and reaches his family home. He is elated to learn that his father, Andy Carson (Eddy Waller), was wounded, but survived the attack. The senior Carson tells his son that the feud is still a real problem because he, Andy, has been falsely accused of killing a Sterling clan member, Linc Sterling. In an effort to end the years-long feud, Carson challenges Martin Sterling (Michael Sloane) to a showdown. Just prior to the gunfight, Martin is ambushed by his own sister, Melinda (Peggy Stewart), so that she can save Martin and take his place in the shoot-out. We learn that much of the ongoing feud is being fueled by a 3rd group of actors, led by Pop Jordan (Wade Crosby), and both the Sterlings and the Carsons are being played. Melinda is wounded in the shoot-out, but both families come together to defeat the Jordan gang. In the end, Sunset Carson and Melinda Sterling end up in each other's arms.

== Cast ==
- Sunset Carson as Sunset Carson
- Peggy Stewart as Melinda Sterling
- Mira McKinney as Harriet Sterling
- Monte Hale as Ward Tuttle
- Wade Crosby as Pop Jordan
- Michael Sloane as Martin Sterling
- Kenne Duncan as Lance
- Tom London as Sheriff Edwards
- Eddy Waller as Andy Carson
- Jack O'Shea as Benji
- Robert J. Wilke as Smoke
- Tex Terry as Flapjack
- Jack Rockwell as Stage Driver
