= Battling Marshal =

1950 film

- Directed by: Oliver Drake
- Written by: Rose Kreves
- Produced by: Oliver Drake; Walt Maddox
- Starring: Sunset Carson; Pat Starling; Lee Roberts
- Cinematography: Clark Ramsey
- Edited by: Julian Bergman
- Music by: Alfonso Corelli
- Production company: Yucca Pictures
- Distributed by: Astor Pictures
- Release date: January 15, 1950
- Running time: 55 minutes
- Country: United States
- Language: English

Battling Marshal is a 1950 American Western film directed by Oliver Drake and starring Sunset Carson, Pat Starling and Lee Roberts. It was distributed by the low-budget company Astor Pictures.

== Cast ==
- Sunset Carson as Marshal Sunset Carson
- Al Terry as Bob Turner
- Pat Starling as Jane Turner
- Lee Roberts as Sidekick Lucky
- Cactus Jr. as Sunset's Horse

== Bibliography ==
- Pitts, Michael R. Western Movies: A Guide to 5,105 Feature Films. McFarland, 2012.
