= The El Paso Kid =

1946 film

- Theatrical release poster
- Directed by: Thomas Carr
- Screenplay by: Norman Sheldon
- Story by: Frank Howard Clark
- Produced by: Bennett Cohen
- Starring: Sunset Carson; Marie Harmon; Hank Patterson; Edmund Cobb; Robert Filmer; Wheaton Chambers
- Cinematography: Edgar Lyons
- Edited by: William P. Thompson
- Production company: Republic Pictures
- Distributed by: Republic Pictures
- Release date: May 22, 1946
- Running time: 54 minutes
- Country: United States
- Language: English

The El Paso Kid is a 1946 American Western film directed by Thomas Carr and written by Norman Sheldon. The film stars Sunset Carson, Marie Harmon, Hank Patterson, Edmund Cobb, Robert Filmer and Wheaton Chambers. The film was released on May 22, 1946, by Republic Pictures.

== Cast ==
- Sunset Carson as Sunset Carson aka El Paso Kid
- Marie Harmon as Sally Stoner
- Hank Patterson as Jeff Winters
- Edmund Cobb as Sheriff Frank Stoner
- Robert Filmer as Gil Santos
- Wheaton Chambers as Doctor Hamlin
- Zon Murray as Henchman Moyer
- Tex Terry as Henchman Kramer
- Ed Cassidy as Well Fargo Agent Blake
- Johnny Carpenter as Express Guard
- Post Park as Stage Driver
- Charles Sullivan as Ed Lowry
