= The Marshal of Windy Hollow =

1972 film

- Directed by: Jerry Whittington
- Written by: Norman Sheldon (writer)
- Produced by: Sunset Carson
- Starring: See below
- Cinematography: Darrell Cathcart
- Edited by: Jerry Whittington
- Music by: Dee Barton
- Release date: 1972
- Running time: 85 minutes
- Country: United States
- Language: English

The Marshal of Windy Hollow is a 1972 American Western film directed by Jerry Whittington and starring Sunset Carson. The film is unique in that it reunites several well-known B movie actors from 1940s Westerns for one last outing.

== Plot ==
The plot is standard Western B movie fare. The Marshal of Windy Hollow (Sunset Carson) teams up with a Texas Ranger (Ken Maynard) to stop a band of outlaws who are preying on innocent settlers and stealing their gold.

== Cast ==
- Sunset Carson as the Marshal
- Ken Maynard as the Texas Ranger
- Tex Ritter as the Mayor
- Tex Barr as Bull
- Wild Bill Cody. as Indian Chief
- Buster Jones as the Outlaw

== Film's whereabouts ==
The Marshal of Windy Hollow was filmed as a true B Western and wrapped up after 12 days of shooting. It is reportedly an action-packed Western in the style of the classic B movies of the 1930s and 1940s. However, the film was never released to the public and today its whereabouts are unknown. In 2012, the undeveloped film turned up in Texas after an estate sale but again, current location is still unknown.

== See also ==
- List of American films of 1972
