= Firebrands of Arizona =

1944 film by Lesley Selander

- Theatrical release poster
- Directed by: Lesley Selander
- Screenplay by: Randall Faye
- Produced by: Louis Gray
- Starring: Smiley Burnette; Sunset Carson; Peggy Stewart; Earle Hodgins; Roy Barcroft; LeRoy Mason
- Cinematography: Bud Thackery
- Edited by: Harry Keller
- Music by: Joseph Dubin
- Production company: Republic Pictures
- Distributed by: Republic Pictures
- Release date: December 1, 1944
- Running time: 55 minutes
- Country: United States
- Language: English

Firebrands of Arizona is a 1944 American Western film directed by Lesley Selander and written by Randall Faye. The film stars Smiley Burnette, Sunset Carson, Peggy Stewart, Earle Hodgins, Roy Barcroft and LeRoy Mason. The film was released on December 1, 1944, by Republic Pictures.

== Cast ==
- Smiley Burnette as Frog / Beefsteak Discoe
- Sunset Carson as Sunset Carson
- Peggy Stewart as Poppy Calhoun
- Earle Hodgins as Sheriff Hoag
- Roy Barcroft as Deputy Ike
- LeRoy Mason as P. T. Bailey
- Tom London as Wagon-Driving Farmer
- Jack Kirk as Henchman Memphis
- Bud Geary as Henchman Slugs
- Rex Lease as Deputy Mike
- Grace Cunard as Woman in Bank (uncredited)

== See also ==
- List of American films of 1944
