= Red River Renegades =

1946 film by Thomas Carr

- Theatrical release poster
- Directed by: Thomas Carr
- Screenplay by: Norman S. Hall
- Produced by: Bennett Cohen
- Starring: Sunset Carson; Peggy Stewart; Tom London; Ted Adams; LeRoy Mason; Kenne Duncan
- Cinematography: William Bradford
- Edited by: William P. Thompson
- Music by: Mort Glickman
- Production company: Republic Pictures
- Distributed by: Republic Pictures
- Release date: July 23, 1946
- Running time: 53 minutes
- Country: United States
- Language: English

Red River Renegades is a 1946 American Western film directed by Thomas Carr and written by Norman S. Hall. The film stars Sunset Carson, Peggy Stewart, Tom London, Ted Adams, LeRoy Mason and Kenne Duncan. It was released on July 23, 1946 by Republic Pictures.

== Plot ==
Postal Inspectors Carson and Underwood investigate a series of robberies in which both the stagecoach and its driver vanish. They join forces with Pinkerton agent Bennett, who has traced some of the stolen money to Stevens.

== Cast ==
- Sunset Carson as Sunset Carson
- Peggy Stewart as Julie Bennett
- Tom London as Pop Underwood
- Ted Adams as Frank Stevens
- LeRoy Mason as Lon Ballard
- Kenne Duncan as Henchman Hackett
- Richard Beavers as Dave Webster
- Edmund Cobb as Mark Webster
