= Linda Stirling =

American actress (1921–1997)

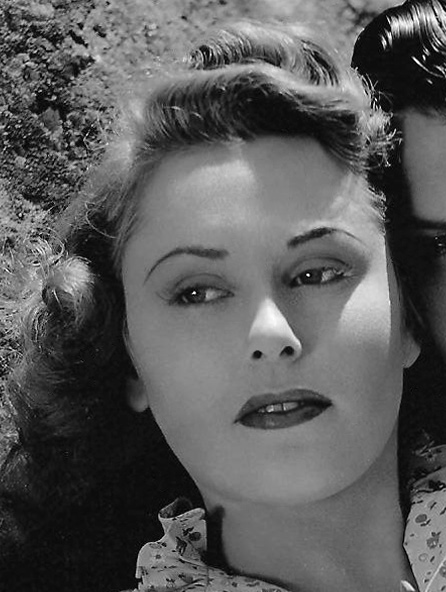
- Stirling in Zorro's Black Whip (1944)
- Born: Louise Schultz; October 11, 1921; Long Beach, California, U.S.
- Died: July 20, 1997 (aged 75); Studio City, Los Angeles, California, U.S.
- Occupations: Actress; model; showgirl
- Years active: 1943–1959
- Spouse: Sloan Nibley (m. 1946; died 1990)
- Children: 2
- Parent(s): Mr. and Mrs. Alex Schultz

Linda Stirling (born Louise Schultz; October 11, 1921 – July 20, 1997) was an American showgirl, model, and actress. In her later years, she had a second career as a college English professor for more than two decades. She is most famous for her roles in movie serials.

== Early years ==
The daughter of Mr. and Mrs. Alex Schultz, Stirling was born in Long Beach, California. She attended Burnett Grammar School, George Washington Junior High School, and Long Beach Polytechnic High School.

She began studying drama when she was 12, and she eventually studied for two years at Ben Bard's Academy of Dramatic Arts. She also was active in the Long Beach Players' Guild.

Stirling worked as a model for photographers and acted in summer stock theater.

== Film ==
In the book In the Nick of Time: Motion Picture Sound Serials, William C. Cline wrote, "Of the characteristics necessary in a heroine, Linda Stirling possessed all — presence, wholesomeness, beauty and versatility — and any single one would have been sufficient in her case."

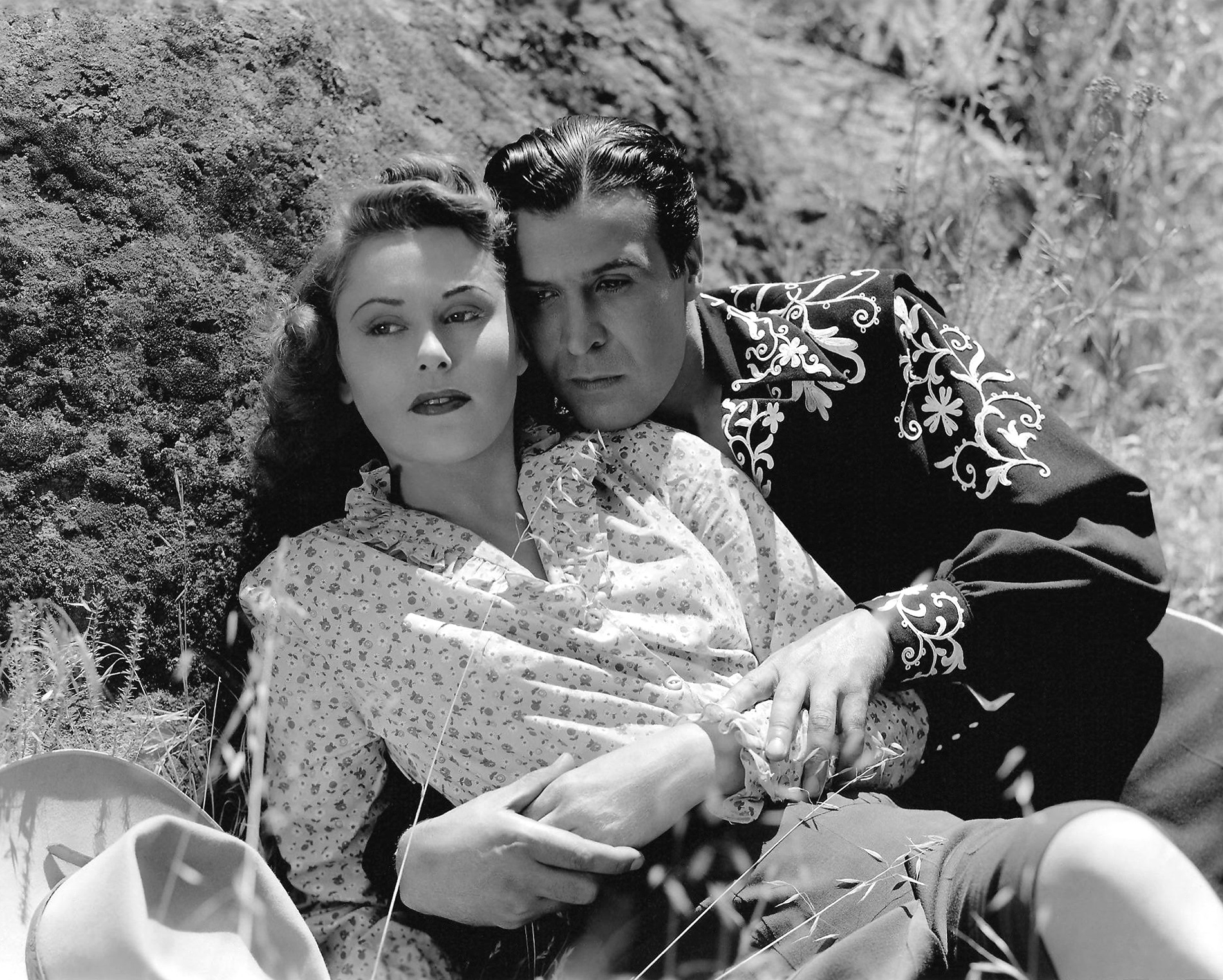
From Zorro's Black Whip (1944), Linda Stirling and George J. Lewis.

Stirling's first role was as a model in The Powers Girl in 1943 and her first role in a serial was the title character in The Tiger Woman (1944). She was featured as the heroine in Zorro's Black Whip (1944).

After her marriage, she essentially retired from films to raise a family, although she later appeared in occasional episodes of television shows, beginning in 1952.

== Later years ==
After her career as an actress ended, and her children had grown, Stirling earned her bachelor's and her master's degree at UCLA. With her degree in hand, Stirling began a new career as a teacher of college English and drama in the 1960s at Glendale College in Glendale, California between 1967 and 1992.

In her later life, Stirling sought to distance herself in the classroom from her Hollywood past, but still remained active on the film convention circuit until the last years of her life. She also appeared in a 1990 documentary on Republic Pictures, the studio where she did the bulk of her work.

== Personal life ==
In 1946, she married Republic screenwriter Sloan Nibley. They had two sons.

== Death ==
Stirling died of cancer in Studio City, Los Angeles, California in 1997.

== Recognition ==
Stirling was one of the original winners of the Golden Boot Awards in 1983 for her contributions to western cinema.

== Filmography ==
Film
Year	Title	Role	Notes
1943	The Powers Girl	Model	Alternative title: Hello Beautiful
1944	The Tiger Woman	Tiger Woman / Rita Arnold	Alternative title: Perils of the Darkest Jungle
1944	The San Antonio Kid	Ann Taylor	
1944	Strangers in the Night	Rosemary in Portrait	Uncredited
1944	Sheriff of Sundown	Lois Carpenter	
1944	Vigilantes of Dodge City	Carol Franklin	
1944	Zorro's Black Whip	Barbara Meredith / The Black Whip	Serial
1945	The Topeka Terror	June Hardy	
1945	Sheriff of Cimarron	Helen Burton	
1945	Manhunt of Mystery Island	Claire Forrest	Alternative title: Captain Mephisto and the Transformation Machine
1945	Santa Fe Saddlemates	Ann Morton	
1945	The Purple Monster Strikes	Shelia Layton	Alternative titles: D-Day on Mars; The Purple Shadow Strikes
1945	Dakota	Entertainer	Uncredited
1945	The Cherokee Flash	Joan Mason	
1945	Wagon Wheels Westward	Arlie Adams	
1946	The Madonna's Secret	Helen North	
1946	Passkey to Danger	Model	Uncredited
1946	The Invisible Informer	Eve Rogers	
1946	The Mysterious Mr. Valentine	Janet Spencer	
1946	Rio Grande Raiders	Nancy Harding	
1946	The Crimson Ghost	Diana Farnsworth	
1946	The Magnificent Rogue	Model	Uncredited
1946	That Brennan Girl	Minor Role	Uncredited; Alternative title: Tough Girl
1947	Jesse James Rides Again	Ann Bolton	
1947	The Pretender	Flo Ronson	
Television
Year	Title	Role	Notes
1954	The Pepsi-Cola Playhouse	Helen Blayne	1 episode: "The Woman on the Bus"
1954	Adventures of the Falcon		1 episode
1954–1955	The Public Defender	Betty	2 episodes
1954–1955	The Adventures of Kit Carson	Various roles	3 episodes
1955	The Man Behind the Badge	Nettie Perry	1 episode
1955	Medic	Ellen McClure	1 episode
1956	Cavalcade of America		1 episode
1956	The Life and Legend of Wyatt Earp	Joan Laramie	1 episode
1956	The Millionaire	Martha	1 episode
1957	On Trial		1 episode
1959	The Real McCoys	Mrs. Baker	1 episode, (final appearance)
