= The Invisible Informer =

1946 film by Philip Ford

- Directed by: Philip Ford
- Written by: Gerald Adams; Sherman Lowe
- Starring: Linda Stirling; William Henry; Adele Mara
- Cinematography: William Bradford
- Music by: Mort Glickman
- Production company: Republic Pictures
- Distributed by: Republic Pictures
- Release date: August 19, 1946 (US)
- Running time: 57 minutes
- Country: United States
- Language: English

The Invisible Informer is a 1946 American action film starring Linda Stirling, William Henry, and Adele Mara. Produced by Republic Pictures, it was directed by Philip Ford and written by Gerald Adams and Sherman Lowe.

== Plot ==
Insurance investigators Eve Rogers and Mike Reagan are assigned to a Louisiana case involving a stolen emerald necklace, following a private detective's death. Disagreeing over how to work the case, Eve and Mike decide to do so separately, not revealing their true identities to their suspects, the Baylor family.

Rosalind Baylor confides that she and her mother despise brother Eric and relate how another brother, David, committed suicide. Eric takes a romantic interest in Eve, which becomes mutual, even though he is under suspicion. Mike, meantime, teams with Marie Revelle, a woman he meets, unaware that she is secretly Eric's lover.

David turns out to be still alive. But when he presses his brother Eric for his cut of the insurance loot, Eric kills him. Eric also murders Marie and has the same thing in mind for Eve after discovering who she really is, but a violent fistfight with Mike results in Eric's death and recovery of the necklace. Mike and Eve, relieved to be alive, realize they are in love with one another.

== Cast ==
- Linda Stirling as Eve Rogers
- William Henry as Mike Reagan
- Adele Mara as Marie Revelle
- Peggy Stewart as Rosalind Baylor
- Gerald Mohr as Eric Baylor
- Claire DuBrey as Martha
