= The Cherokee Flash =

1945 film

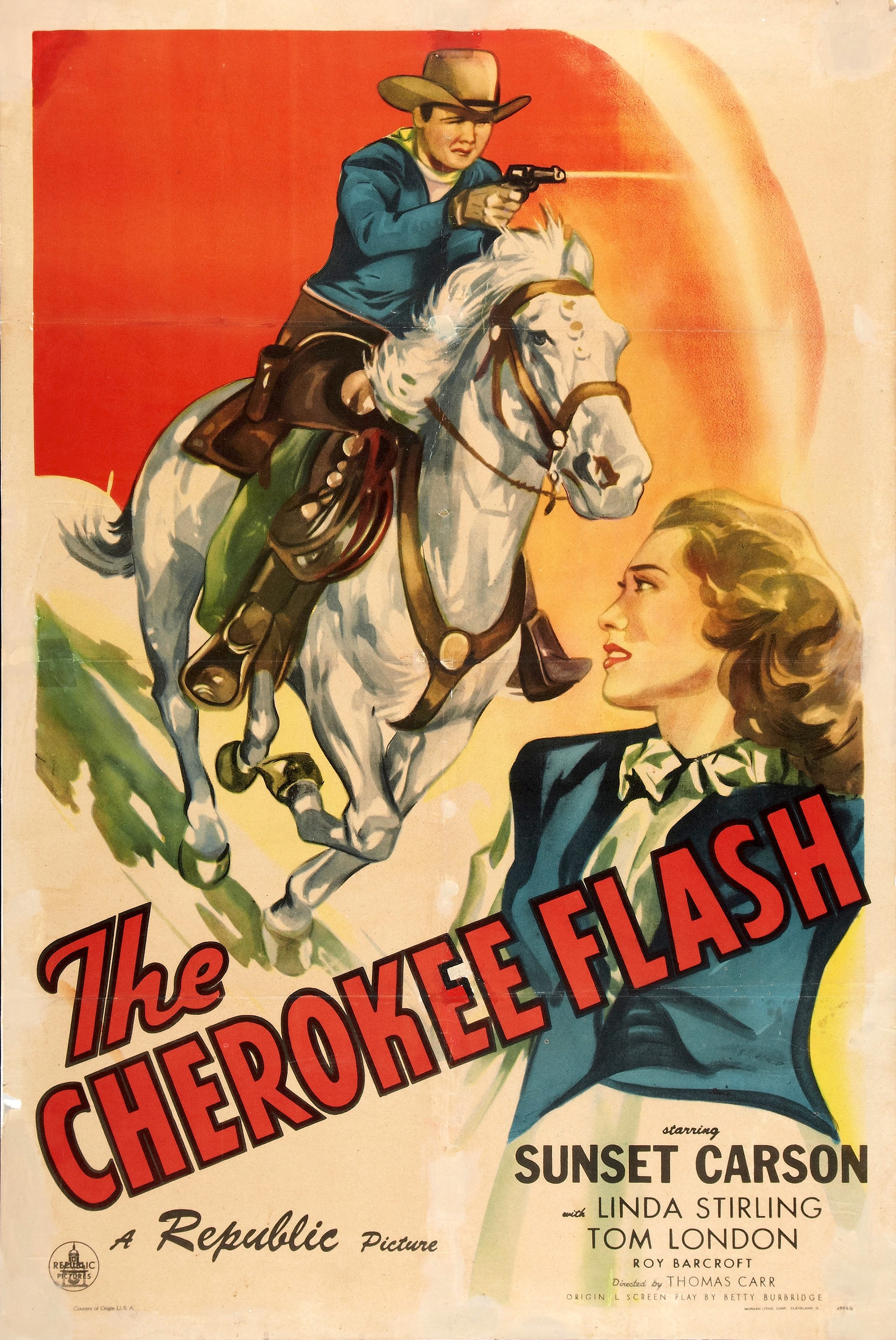
- Movie poster
- Directed by: Thomas Carr
- Written by: Betty Burbridge
- Produced by: Bennett Cohen
- Starring: see list below
- Cinematography: Reggie Lanning
- Edited by: Charles Craft
- Distributed by: Republic Pictures
- Release date: December 13, 1945
- Running time: 58 minutes
- Country: United States
- Language: English

The Cherokee Flash is a 1945 American Western film directed by Thomas Carr. It is a Sunset Carson serial Western in which Carson works to free his father and clear the family name from a crime his father did not commit.

== Plot ==
Lawyer Butler, wanting Jeff Carson's ranch, has the Sheriff and his gang frame the bank holdup on him. Then they kill a witness that could free Carson and blame the murder on his son Sunset. But Sunset escapes, frees his father, and then sets a trap to catch the real killers.

== Cast ==
- Sunset Carson as Sunset Carson
- Linda Stirling as Joan Mason
- Tom London as Utah
- Roy Barcroft as Jeff Carson
- John Merton as Mark "Blackie" Butler
- Bud Geary as Sheriff Baldwin
- Frank Jaquet as Doc Mason
- Fred Graham as Tom Stanton
- Joe McGuinn as Deputy Green
- Pierce Lyden as Clint Hawkins
- James Linn as Henchman Rand
