= Sunset Carson =

American actor (1920–1990

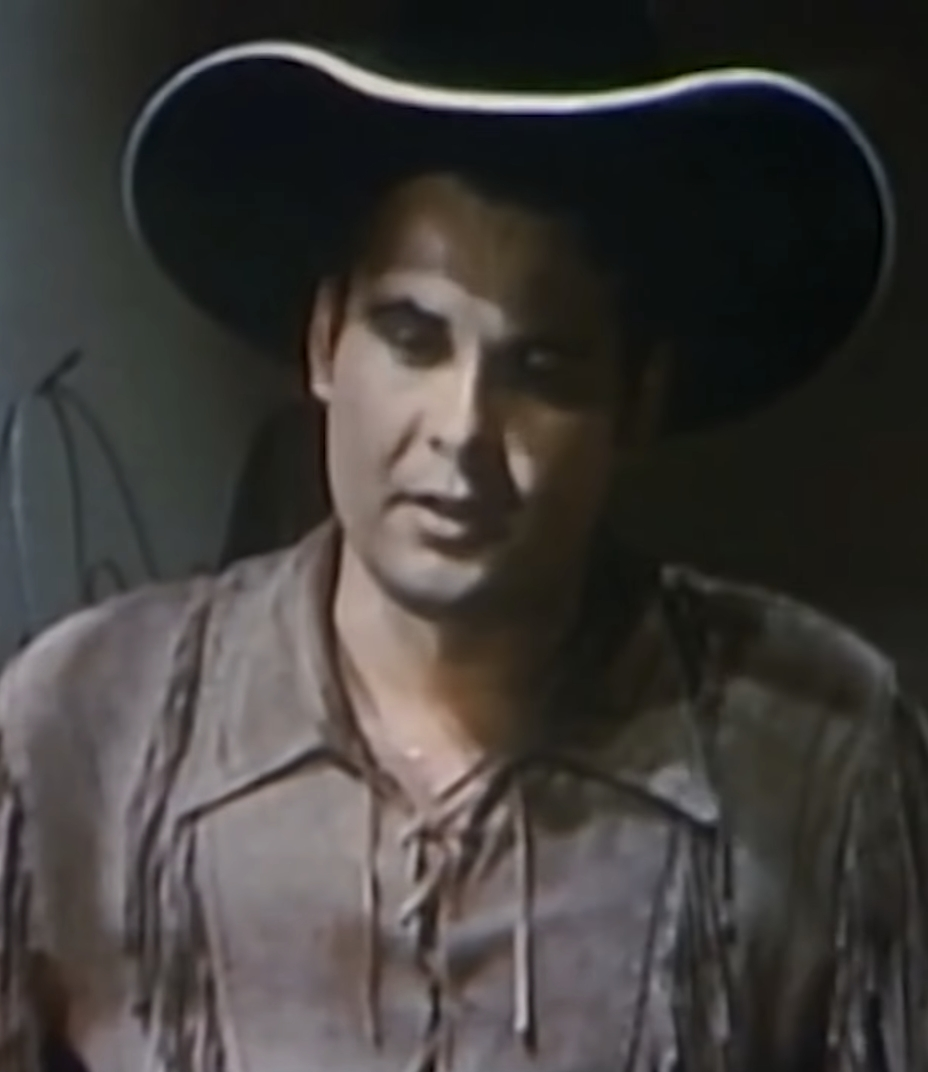
- Carson in Sunset Carson Rides Again (1948)
- Born: Winifred Maurice Harrison or Michael Harrison; November 12, 1920; Gracemont, Oklahoma, U.S.
- Died: May 1, 1990 (aged 69); Reno, Nevada, U.S.
- Resting place: Highland Memorial Gardens, Jackson, Madison County, Tennessee
- Occupations: Actor; rodeo rider
- Years active: 1940–1985

Sunset Carson (born Winifred Maurice Harrison or Michael Harrison, November 12, 1920 – May 1, 1990) was an American B-movie Western star of the 1940s.

== Early life, acting ==
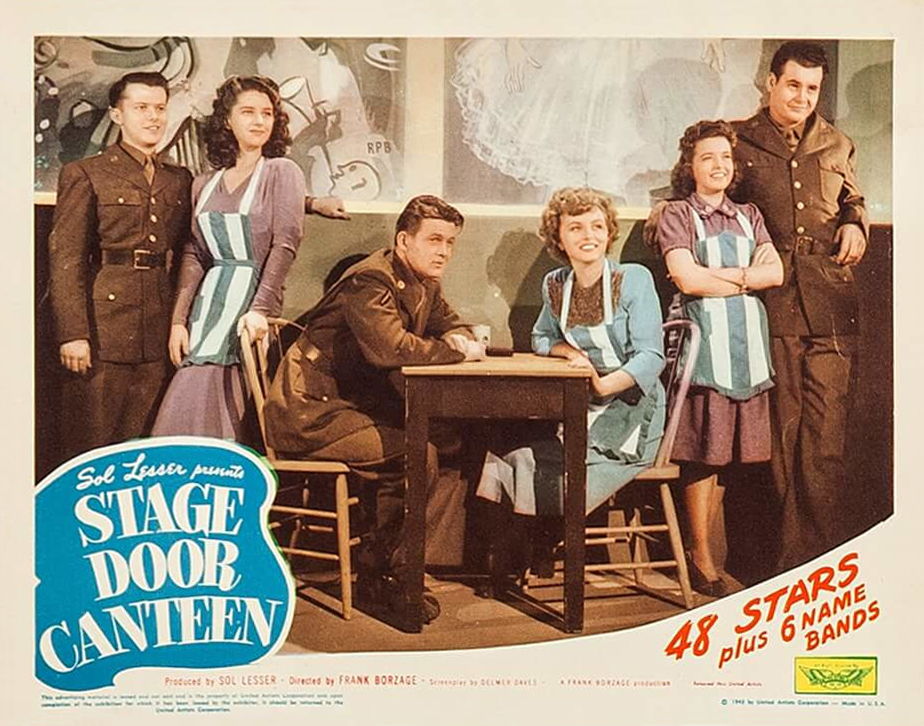
Lon McCallister, Marjorie Riordan, William Terry, Cheryl Walker, Margaret Early, and Michael Harrison in Stage Door Canteen (1943)

Carson was born on November 12, 1920, at Gracemont, Oklahoma, as either Winifred Maurice Harrison or Michael Harrison, to Maurice Greely Harrison and Azalee Belle McAdams. He moved to Plainview, Texas, as a child (per the 1930 US Census Hale County, Texas).

Carson became an accomplished rodeo rider in his youth. For a time, he worked in a Western show owned by early cowboy actor Tom Mix. In 1940, he traveled to South America, where he competed in rodeos for two years. After his return to the U.S., he played small parts in the 1943 film Stage Door Canteen, and the big-budget 1944 film Janie, both having him billed as "Michael Harrison". Catching the attention of Republic Pictures executive Lou Grey, he was signed to a contract and given his own series of B-movie Westerns beginning in 1944, changing his name to "Sunset Carson".

=== Career peak and "Cactus" ===
At the height of his career in 1945, Carson was ranked as one of the top ten money-making Western stars in the industry. During his tenure at Republic Pictures, he was known for riding a sorrel horse named "Cactus." While official studio reports suggested his contract was terminated in 1946 due to a public intoxication incident at a studio function, Carson maintained until his death that his departure was the result over his salary and creative control. Following his departure from Republic, he transitioned to independent productions with Astor Pictures and Yucca Pictures, though these films typically had significantly lower budgets.

== Fame and career climb ==
Within two years, Carson was on the top-10 list of money makers for Western stars. He was given a horse named "Cactus", and starred in a string of somewhat-successful Western genre films. In 1944, he starred in Bordertown Trail, Code of the Prairie, and Firebrands of Arizona opposite Smiley Burnette. In 1945 (the peak of his career), his first film was Sheriff of Cimarron, followed by Santa Fe Saddlemates, Bells of Rosarita, Oregon Trail, Bandits of the Badlands, Rough Riders of Cheyenne, and The Cherokee Flash.

In 1946, Carson began the year strongly, starring in Days of Buffalo Bill and Alias Billy the Kid. He followed those with The El Paso Kid, Red River Renegades, and Rio Grande Raiders. However, by the end of 1946, Carson and Republic Pictures were having disputes. He claimed the disputes were over his contract. Republic Pictures later claimed that he was fired by Republic creator and executive officer Herbert Yates after attending a studio function while intoxicated and in the company of an underaged girl. By year’s end, Republic and he had parted company. He would never again achieve any large degree of acting success.

== Career decline, retirement, and death ==
In 1948, he starred for Astor Pictures in Fighting Mustang, Deadline, and Sunset Carson Rides Again. Then in 1949, he starred in Rio Grande, and in 1950, he starred as the lead character, for the last time, in Battling Marshal. By the following year, his career was all but over as a leading actor of the day. Over the next several years, he obtained only small bit parts.

Years later, he played the lead in a B-movie called The Marshal of Windy Hollow (1972), a film that co-starred a host of old-time actors, including Ken Maynard, Tex Ritter, and Bill Cody, Jr. He then had a bit part in the film Buckstone County Prison in 1978, and another bit part in the 1985 sci-fi movie Alien Outlaw (his last film role).

He toured for five years with Tommy Scott's Country Music Circus. In the early 1980s, Carson hosted Six-Gun Heroes, a South Carolina Educational TV (SCETV) show produced by Jim Welch presenting classic B Westerns. In 1985, Carson appeared in an episode of the television series Simon & Simon.

== Death ==
Carson retired to Reno, Nevada. He died there on May 1, 1990. He was survived by his fifth wife and his two children. He is buried at Highland Memorial Gardens in Jackson, Madison County, Tennessee.

== Filmography ==
- Stage Door Canteen (1943) as Tex
- Call of the Rockies (1944) co-starred Kirk Alyn, Smiley Burnette
- Bordertown Trail (1944)
- Code of the Prairie (1944) co-starred Roy Barcroft
- Firebrands of Arizona (1944) co-starred Roy Barcroft
- Sheriff of Cimarron (1945) co-starred Linda Stirling
- Santa Fe Saddlemates (1945) co-starred Roy Barcroft, Kenne Duncan, Linda Stirling
- Bells of Rosarita (1945) co-starred Roy Rogers, Red Barry, Rocky Lane and Gabby Hayes
- Oregon Trail (1945) co-starred Kenne Duncan, Monte Hale
- Bandits of the Badlands (1945) co-starred Monte Hale
- Rough Riders of Cheyenne (1945) co-starred Monte Hale, Kenne Duncan
- The Cherokee Flash (1945) co-starred Linda Stirling, Roy Barcroft
- Days of Buffalo Bill (1946)
- Alias Billy the Kid (1946) co-starred Roy Barcroft
- The El Paso Kid (1946)
- Red River Renegades (1946) co-starred Kenne Duncan
- Rio Grande Raiders (1946) co-starred Linda Stirling, Bob Steele (actor), Tris Coffin, Kenne Duncan, Bobby Barber
- Fighting Mustang (1948)
- Deadline (1948)
- Sunset Carson Rides Again (1948) co-starred Ron Ormond
- Rio Grande (1949)
- Battling Marshal (1950)
- The Marshal of Windy Hollow (1972)
- Buckstone County Prison (1978)
- Alien Outlaw (1985)
