= Frisco Tornado =

1950 film by R. G. Springsteen

- Theatrical release poster
- Directed by: R. G. Springsteen
- Screenplay by: M. Coates Webster
- Produced by: Gordon Kay
- Starring: Allan Lane; Eddy Waller; Martha Hyer; Stephen Chase; Ross Ford; Mauritz Hugo
- Cinematography: John MacBurnie
- Edited by: Robert M. Leeds
- Music by: Stanley Wilson
- Production company: Republic Pictures
- Distributed by: Republic Pictures
- Release dates: September 6, 1950; December 5, 1950 (New York)
- Running time: 60 minutes
- Country: United States
- Language: English

Frisco Tornado is a 1950 American Western film directed by R. G. Springsteen and written by M. Coates Webster. The film stars Allan Lane, Eddy Waller, Martha Hyer, Stephen Chase, Ross Ford and Mauritz Hugo. It was released on September 6, 1950 by Republic Pictures.

== Cast ==
- Allan Lane as Marshal Rocky Lane
- Black Jack as Black Jack
- Eddy Waller as Nugget Clark
- Martha Hyer as Jean Martin
- Stephen Chase as Jim Crail
- Ross Ford as Paul Weston
- Mauritz Hugo as Henchman Brod
- Lane Bradford as Henchman Mike Bristol
- Hal Price as Storekeeper
- Rex Lease as Henchman
- George Chesebro as Stage Guard
- Edmund Cobb as 1st Stage Driver

== Reception ==
Critic Dorothy Masters of the New York Daily News wrote: "I hope Allan Lane is well paid for his work in 'Frisco Tornado.' He deserves every cent of it, plus a few dollars extra, in his strenuous tenure as marshall ... Getting shot at is routine, naturally, for anybody who sets out to do a one-man cleanup job on a passel of varmints, but Rocky is uncommonly reckless of life and limb. The less agile and lazier cowboy stars don't engage so realistically—if at all—in the kind of stuff that burns up Lane's energy."
