= Thomas Carr (director) =

American actor and director (1907–1997)

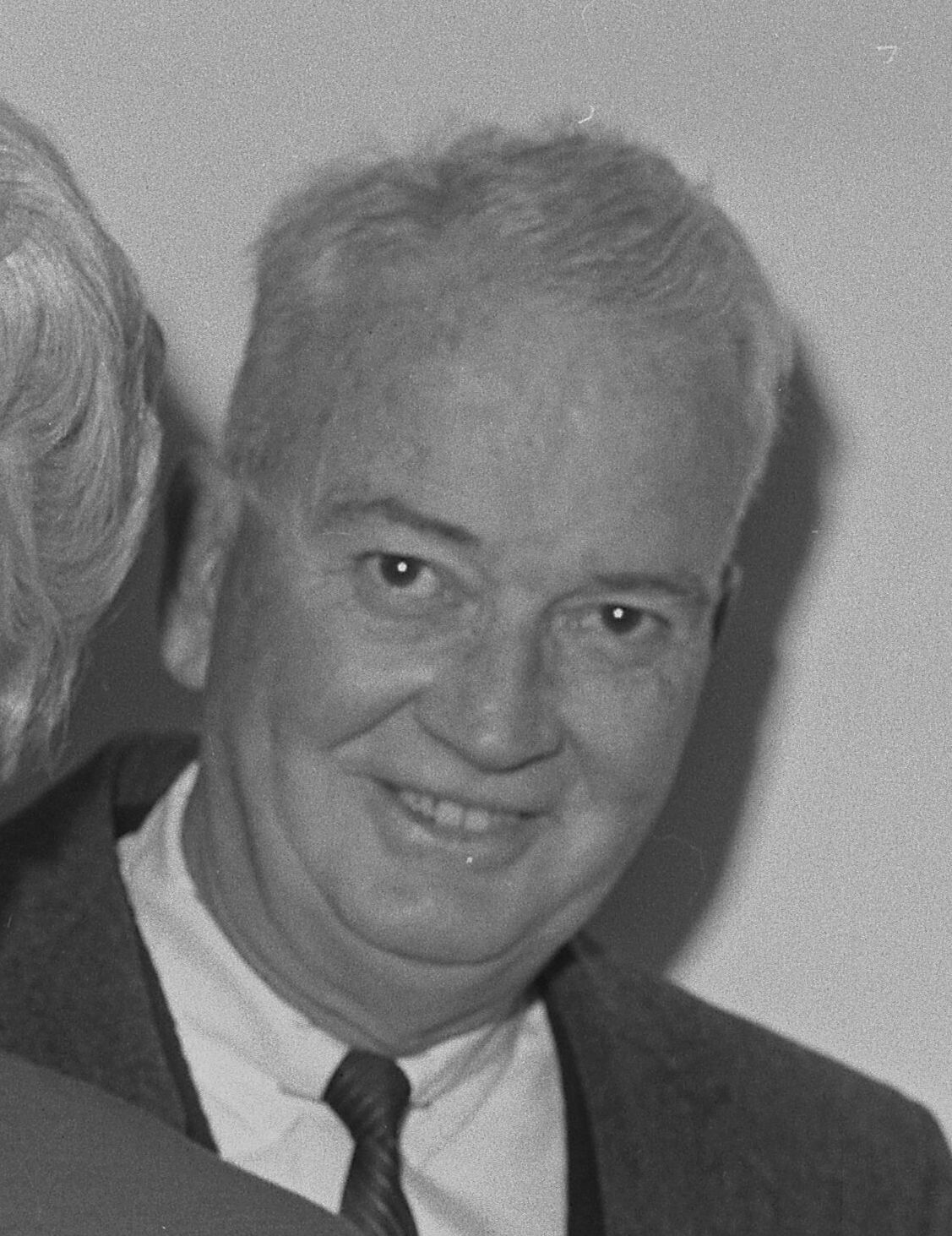
- Carr in 1964
- Born: Thomas Howard Carr; July 4, 1907; Philadelphia, Pennsylvania, U.S.
- Died: April 23, 1997 (aged 89); Ventura, California, U.S.
- Other names: Tommy Carr; Thomas Carr
- Occupations: Actor, director
- Years active: 1915–1968
- Mother: Mary Carr

Thomas Howard Carr (July 4, 1907 – April 23, 1997) was an American actor and film director of Hollywood films and television programs. Often billed as "Tommy Carr", he later adopted his more formal "Thomas Carr" birth name as his billing name.

== Biography ==
Carr was born into an acting family on July 4, 1907 in Philadelphia, Pennsylvania. His father was the actor William Carr and his mother was the actress Mary Carr. Thomas Carr followed the family profession, and in 1915 began acting in silent films. From 1915 through 1953, Carr played small supporting roles in a number of low budget Hollywood films, but Carr's star as an actor did not rise.

In 1945, he turned to directing, and from 1945 through 1951 Carr directed numerous B movies for Hollywood's Poverty Row. Most of Carr's films were Westerns, but in 1948 he was co-director (along with Spencer Gordon Bennet) of the live-action Superman serial. He directed 38 episodes of Adventures of Superman including Stamp Day for Superman. His older brother Stephen was a recurring cast member in various roles and was the dialogue director during the first season of Adventures of Superman. Steve is seen pointing "up in the sky" during the opening credits of the black and white episodes.

From 1951 to 1968, he directed episodes of numerous television shows in the 1950s and 1960s, including episodes of Lassie (3 episodes), Trackdown (18 episodes), Wanted: Dead or Alive (26 episodes), Richard Diamond, Private Detective (16 episodes), Stagecoach West (17 episodes), Rawhide (28 episodes) and Daniel Boone (3 episodes).

Thomas Carr retired from directing in 1968. He died in Ventura, California on 23 April 1997.

== Partial filmography ==
Actor

- Velvet Fingers (1920)
- A Heart to Let (1921)
- Polly of the Follies (1922)
- The Road to Ruin (1928)
- Men Without Law (1930)
- Secret Agent X-9 (1937)
- Flash Gordon's Trip to Mars (1938)
- Calling All Marines (1939)

Director

- The Cherokee Flash (1945)
- Alias Billy the Kid (1946)
- The El Paso Kid (1946)
- Red River Renegades (1946)
- Jesse James Rides Again (1947)
- Song of the Wasteland (1947)
- Brick Bradford (1947)
- Superman (1948)
- Congo Bill (1948)
- Dead or Alive (1951)
- The Maverick (1952)
- Captain Scarlett (1953)
- The Desperado (1954)
- Dino (1957)
- The Tall Stranger (1957)
- Cast a Long Shadow (1959)

== Bibliography ==
- Holmstrom, John. The Moving Picture Boy: An International Encyclopaedia from 1895 to 1995, Norwich, Michael Russell, 1996, p. 30.

Preceded by None	Superman film director 1948 (with Spencer Gordon Bennet)	Succeeded by Spencer Gordon Bennet
