= Bennett Cohen =

American screenwriter

- Born: August 28, 1890; Trinidad, Colorado, USA
- Died: June 10, 1964 (aged 73); Los Angeles, California, USA
- Years active: 1915-1953

Bennett Cohen (August 28, 1890 – June 10, 1964) was an American screenwriter and director. He wrote for more than 180 films between 1915 and 1953. He also directed 17 films between 1925 and 1934. He was born in Trinidad, Colorado and died in Los Angeles, California.

== Selected filmography ==
- Guilty (1916)
- The Man Who Took a Chance (1917)
- Fame and Fortune (1918)
- The Unknown Wife (1921)
- Mind Over Motor (1923)
- Two Fisted Justice (1924)
- Dangerous Traffic (1926)
- The Grey Devil (1926)
- Midnight Faces (1926)
- The Grey Devil (1926)
- Thunderbolt's Tracks (1927)
- The Avenging Shadow (1928)
- Laddie Be Good (1928)
- The Code of the Scarlet (1928)
- Cheyenne (1929)
- Some Mother's Boy (1929)
- Señor Americano (1929)
- The Saddle King (1929)
- Under Montana Skies (1930)
- West of Cheyenne (1931)
- Come on Danger! (1932)
- The Lone Trail (1932)
- Mystery Mountain (1934)
- Adventures of Texas Jack (1934)
- The New Adventures of Tarzan (1935)
- Wilderness Mail (1935)
- Tundra (1936)
- The Border Patrolman (1936)
- The Fighting Deputy (1937)
- Raw Timber (1937)
- South of Arizona (1938)
- Pioneer Days (1940)
- Red River Robin Hood (1942)
- The Cherokee Flash (1945)
- Robin Hood of Monterey (1947)
- King of the Bandits (1947)
