= List of Universal Pictures films (1960–1969) =

This is a list of films produced or distributed by Universal Pictures in 1960–1969, founded in 1912 as the Universal Film Manufacturing Company. It is the main motion picture production and distribution arm of Universal Studios, a subsidiary of the NBCUniversal division of Comcast.

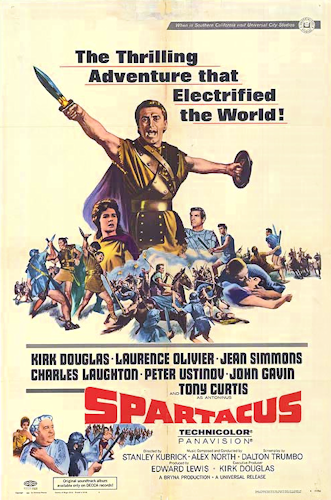
Poster for Spartacus (1960)

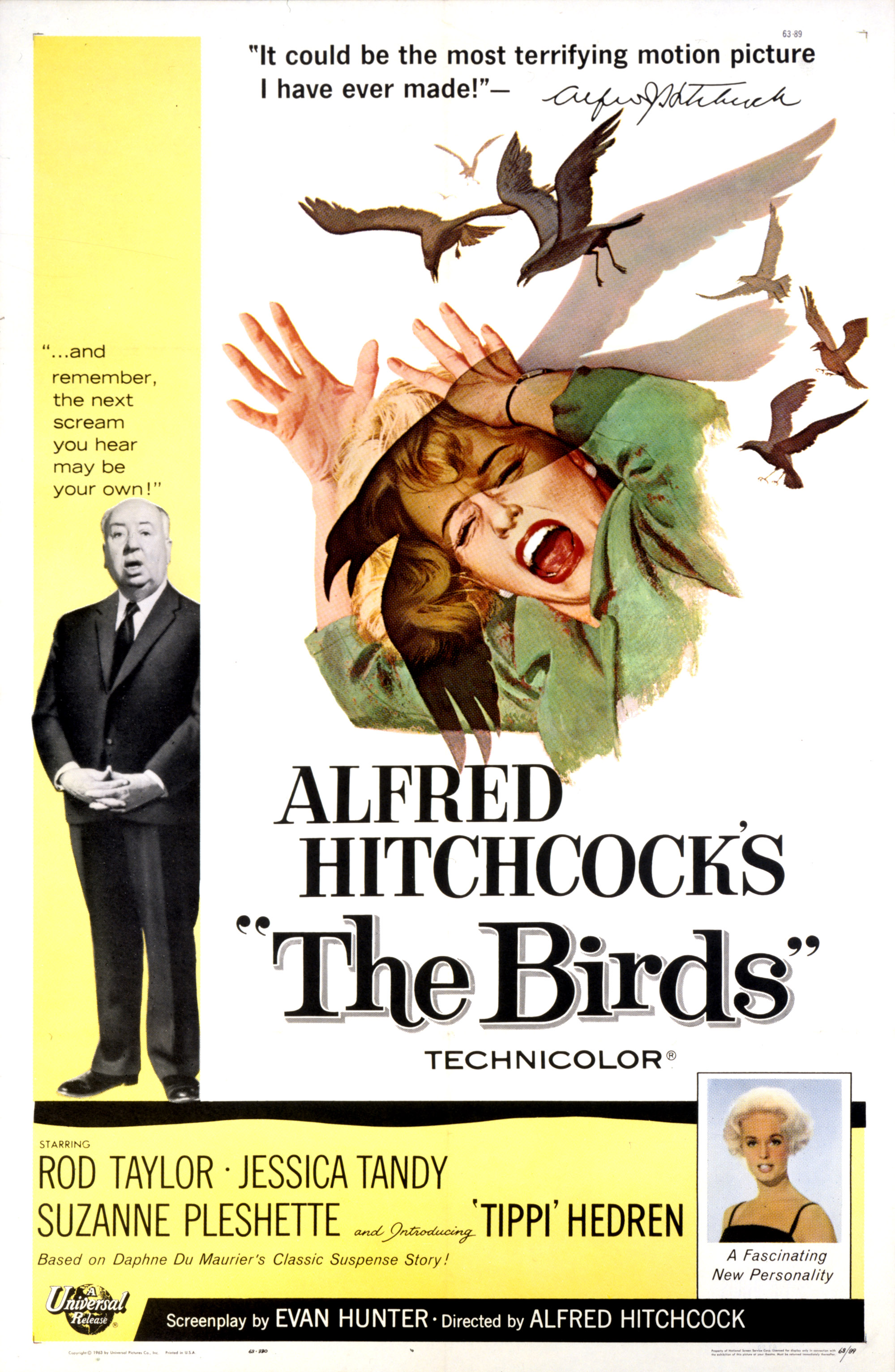
Poster for The Birds (1963)

== 1960 ==
Release date	Title	Notes
January 20, 1960	The Private Lives of Adam and Eve	co-productionwith Albert Zugsmith Productions, Famous Players and Fryman Enterprises
February 1, 1960	Hell Bent for Leather	
February 10, 1960	Four Fast Guns	distribution only; produced by Phoenix Film Studios Productions
April 1960	Head of a Tyrant	U.S. distribution of an Italian film
May 15, 1960	Othello	U.S. distribution of a Russian film
May 1960	The Leech Woman	
July 27, 1960	Portrait in Black	
August 10, 1960	Dinosaurus! (Note: Owned by Worldwide Entertainment Corporation, with distribution rights licensed to Sony Pictures)	distribution only; produced by Fairview Productions and Jack Harris Productions
August 20, 1960	College Confidential	
September 5, 1960	The Brides of Dracula	U.S. distribution of a British film
September 25, 1960	Seven Ways from Sundown	
October 13, 1960	Midnight Lace	
October 19, 1960	Spartacus	co-production with Bryna Productions Winner of the Golden Globe Award for Best Motion Picture - Drama.
December 23, 1960	The Grass Is Greener (Note: Owned by Paramount Pictures (via Melange Pictures))	distribution only; co-production with Grandon Productions Ltd. Nominee of the Golden Globe Award for Best Motion Picture – Comedy.
December 28, 1960	Chartroose Caboose	co-production with Redbill Productions

== 1961 ==
Release date	Title	Notes
February 1961	The Great Impostor	
March 1, 1961	Posse from Hell	
March 20, 1961	Blast of Silence (Note: Co-owned by Allen Baron)	co-production with Magla Productions
April 1961	The Secret Ways	co-production with Heath Productions
April 1, 1961	Tomboy and the Champ	co-production with Signal Pictures
May 1, 1961	Ole Rex	
May 15, 1961	Wings of Chance	
May 1961	The Pharaohs' Woman	U.S. distribution
June 7, 1961	The Shadow of the Cat	U.S. distribution
June 7, 1961	The Curse of the Werewolf	U.S. distribution
June 8, 1961	The Last Sunset	co-production with Brynaprod
June 8, 1961	Romanoff and Juliet	co-production with Pavla
July 26, 1961	Tammy Tell Me True	co-production with Ross Hunter Productions Inc.
August 9, 1961	Between Time and Eternity	U.S. distribution of a Spanish-West German international co-production
August 9, 1961	Come September	
October 4, 1961	The Sergeant Was a Lady	
October 11, 1961	Back Street	
November 9, 1961	Flower Drum Song (Note: Co-owned by Samuel Goldwyn Films)	distribution only; co-production with Hunter-Field Productions
December 1961	The Outsider	

== 1962 ==
Release date	Title	Notes
March 3, 1962	Lover Come Back	co-production with 7 Pictures, Nob Hill Productions Inc. and Arwin Productions
April 24, 1962	Six Black Horses	
May 1962	The Day the Earth Caught Fire	U.S. distribution
May 24, 1962	Lonely Are the Brave	co-production with Joel Productions
June 13, 1962	Captain Clegg	U.S. distribution of a British film
June 14, 1962	That Touch of Mink	distribution only; co-production with Granley Company, Arwin Productions and Nob Hill Productions Inc. Nominee of the Golden Globe Award for Best Motion Picture – Comedy.
June 15, 1962	Cape Fear	co-production with Melville Productions and Talbot Productions
August 3, 1962	The Spiral Road	
August 15, 1962	The Phantom of the Opera	U.S. distribution
September 20, 1962	No Man Is an Island	co-production with Gold Coast Productions
October 1, 1962	Stagecoach to Dancers' Rock	co-production with Gray-Mac Productions
October 10, 1962	If a Man Answers	Nominee of the Golden Globe Award for Best Motion Picture – Comedy.
December 12, 1962	Freud: The Secret Passion	co-production with Bavaria Film; Nominee of the Golden Globe Award for Best Motion Picture – Drama.
December 31, 1962	40 Pounds of Trouble	co-production with Curtis Enterprises

== 1963 ==
Release date	Title	Notes
March 16, 1963	To Kill a Mockingbird	co-production with Pakula-Mulligan and Brentwood Productions; Nominee of the Academy Award for Best Picture. Nominee of the Golden Globe Award for Best Motion Picture - Drama.
March 29, 1963	The Birds	co-production with Alfred J. Hitchcock Productions
April 2, 1963	The Ugly American	
May 3, 1963	Showdown	
May 15, 1963	Paranoiac	U.S. distribution of British films
May 29, 1963	Tammy and the Doctor	co-production with Ross Hunter Productions Inc.
May 29, 1963	The List of Adrian Messenger	co-production with Joel Productions
June 5, 1963	Lancelot and Guinevere	U.S. distribution of an Emblem Productions film
June 21, 1963	A Gathering of Eagles	
June 26, 1963	King Kong vs. Godzilla	U.S. distribution of 1962 Japanese Toho film
July 17, 1963	The Thrill of It All	
August 7, 1963	For Love or Money	
August 22, 1963	Mystery Submarine	U.S. distribution of British films
September 11, 1963	Kiss of the Vampire	U.S. distribution of British films
December 5, 1963	Charade	co-production with Stanley Donen Films
December 25, 1963	Captain Newman, M.D.	co-production with Brentwood Productions and Reynard
December 1963	The Raiders	co-production with Revue Studios

== 1964 ==
Release date	Title	Notes
January 29, 1964	Man's Favorite Sport?	co-production with Laurel Productions and Gibraltar Productions
February 26, 1964	He Rides Tall	co-production with Gordon Kay & Associates
April 3, 1964	Dark Purpose	
May 8, 1964	The Evil of Frankenstein	U.S. distribution of a British film
May 20, 1964	The Brass Bottle	co-production with Scarus
May 21, 1964	The Chalk Garden	U.S. distribution of a British filmtion
June 10, 1964	Bedtime Story	co-production with The Lankershim Company and Pennebaker Productions
June 10, 1964	Wild and Wonderful	co-production with Reynard Productions and Harold Hecht Corporation
June 17, 1964	Nightmare	U.S. distribution; last Universal International film
June 1964	McHale's Navy	first universal city studios inc film
July 3, 1964	Island of the Blue Dolphins	co-production with Robert B. Radnitz Productions
July 7, 1964	The Killers	co-production with Revue Studios
July 17, 1964	Marnie	co-production with Alfred J. Hitchcock Productions
August 26, 1964	I'd Rather Be Rich	co-production with Ross Hunter Productions
September 1, 1964	Bullet for a Badman	
October 14, 1964	Send Me No Flowers	co-production with Martin Melcher Productions
October 24, 1964	The Lively Set	
November 4, 1964	Kitten with a Whip	
December 10, 1964	Father Goose	distribution only; co-production with Granox Company; Nominee of the Golden Globe Award for Best Motion Picture – Musical or Comedy.
December 24, 1964	The Guns of August	Documentary U.S. distribution
December 30, 1964	The Night Walker	co-production with William Castle Productions

== 1965 ==
Release date	Title	Notes
January 23, 1965	Andy	co-production with Deran Productions
February 1, 1965	Taggart	
February 10, 1965	Strange Bedfellows	co-production with Fernwood Productions, Panama Productions and Gibraltar Productions
March 24, 1965	Bus Riley's Back in Town	
March 31, 1965	The Truth About Spring	co-production with Quota Rentals Limited
April 1, 1965	The World of Abbott and Costello	co-production with Vanguard Productions
April 1, 1965	The Naked Brigade	co-production with Boxoffice Attractions Inc. and Studio A
April 1965	The Sword of Ali Baba	
April 1965	The Secret of Blood Island	U.S. distribution of a British film
May 5, 1965	Wild Seed	co-production with Pennebaker Productions
May 15, 1965	I Saw What You Did	co-production with William Castle Productions
May 26, 1965	Mirage	
June 3, 1965	Shenandoah	
June 27, 1965	Fluffy	co-production with Scarus
June 30, 1965	The Art of Love	co-production with Ross Hunter Productions and Cherokee Productions
July 9, 1965	McHale's Navy Joins the Air Force	
July 14, 1965	Dark Intruder	co-production with Shamley Productions
August 2, 1965	The Ipcress File (Note: International rights co-owned by ITV Studios)	U.S. distribution only; produced by Lowndes Productions Limited
August 5, 1965	Love and Kisses	
August 14, 1965	A Very Special Favor	co-production with The Lankershim Company
August 25, 1965	That Funny Feeling	
November 17, 1965	The War Lord	co-production with Court Productions
December 22, 1965	Pinocchio in Outer Space	U.S. distribution only; produced by Belvision Studios

== 1966 ==
Release date	Title	Notes
January 5, 1966	Wild Wild Winter	
January 5, 1966	Agent for H.A.R.M.	
January 20, 1966	The Ghost and Mr. Chicken	
January 27, 1966	Moment to Moment	co-production with Mervyn LeRoy Productions Inc.
February 2, 1966	The Rare Breed	
March 3, 1966	Madame X	Remade in 1981; co-production with Ross Hunter Productions
March 25, 1966	A Man Could Get Killed	co-production with Cherokee Productions
April 27, 1966	Gunpoint	
May 5, 1966	Arabesque	U.S. distribution; co-production with Stanley Donen Films
May 12, 1966	Out of Sight	
May 17, 1966	And Now Miguel	co-production with Robert B. Radnitz Productions
May 25, 1966	Blindfold	co-production with 7 Pictures and Gibraltar Productions
June 15, 1966	Johnny Tiger	co-production with Nova-Hugh
July 1, 1966	Incident at Phantom Hill	
July 14, 1966	Torn Curtain	
August 6, 1966	Munster, Go Home!	
August 17, 1966	The Pad and How to Use It	
August 1966	The Plainsman	
September 7, 1966	Beau Geste	
September 14, 1966	The Appaloosa	
October 26, 1966	Texas Across the River	
November 14, 1966	Fahrenheit 451	U.S. distribution only; first film of Universal Pictures Europe
November 18, 1966	Let's Kill Uncle	co-production with William Castle Productions

== 1967 ==
Release date	Title	Notes
1967	The Far Out West	Compilation of several episodes of the TV series Pistols 'n' Petticoats
January 7, 1967	Gambit	
February 1, 1967	Island of Terror	U.S. distribution of a British film
February 7, 1967	Tobruk	
February 21, 1967	Deadlier Than the Male	U.S. distribution of a British film
February 1967	The Projected Man	U.S. distribution of a British film
March 15, 1967	A Countess from Hong Kong	U.S. distribution of a British film
March 21, 1967	Thoroughly Modern Millie	Nominee of the Golden Globe Award for Best Motion Picture – Musical or Comedy.
March 1967	Gunfight in Abilene	
April 21, 1967	Valley of Mystery	TV movie originally a 1966 television pilot Stranded
May 15, 1967	The Jokers	U.S. distribution of a British film
May 27, 1967	The War Wagon	co-production with Batjac Productions and Marvin Schwartz Productions
May 1967	Tammy and the Millionaire	Compilation of several episodes of the TV series Tammy
May 1967	The Ride to Hangman's Tree	
June 7, 1967	Dead Run	
June 14, 1967	The Reluctant Astronaut	
June 26, 1967	Palaces of a Queen	Documentary, U.S. distribution
July 24, 1967	Privilege	U.S. distribution
August 1, 1967	Rough Night in Jericho	co-production with Martin Rackin Productions
August 2, 1967	The Perils of Pauline	
August 1967	The King's Pirate	
September 17, 1967	Games	
November 22, 1967	Rosie!	
December 13, 1967	Banning	
December 20, 1967	Arabella	American distribution

== 1968 ==
Release date	Title	Notes
January 12, 1968	Nobody's Perfect	
January 24, 1968	Pretty Polly	US release of a British film
February 1, 1968	The Ballad of Josie	
February 1, 1968	Sergeant Ryker	re-edited from a two-part 1963 Kraft Suspense Theatre episode, "The Case Against Paul Ryker"
February 7, 1968	The Young Warriors	
February 11, 1968	Charlie Bubbles	US release of a British film
February 29, 1968	The Secret War of Harry Frigg	
March 8, 1968	A Man Called Gannon	
March 15, 1968	Counterpoint	
March 27, 1968	P.J.	
March 29, 1968	Madigan	
April 14, 1968	I'll Never Forget What's'isname	co-production with Scimitar Films
April 24, 1968	The Champagne Murders	US distribution of a French film
May 1, 1968	Don't Just Stand There!	
May 17, 1968	Journey to Shiloh	
May 24, 1968	What's So Bad About Feeling Good?	
May 26, 1968	Boom!	U.S. distribution
May 1968	Warkill	
May 1968	Three Guns for Texas	Compilation of several episodes of the TV series Laredo
May 1968	The Counterfeit Killer	
June 5, 1968	Jigsaw	
June 19, 1968	King Kong Escapes	U.S. distribution only; produced by Toho and Rankin/Bass; originally released in Japan in 1967
July 10, 1968	The Shakiest Gun in the West	
July 12, 1968	A Lovely Way to Die	
July 14, 1968	Did You Hear the One About the Traveling Saleslady?	
July 1968	In Enemy Country	
August 11, 1968	Tante Zita	U.S. distribution of French film
August 26, 1968	The Killing Game	U.S. distribution of French film
August 28, 1968	The Hell with Heroes	
September 18, 1968	Oedipus the King	
September 22, 1968	The Bofors Gun	U.S. distribution of a British film
September 25, 1968	Work Is a Four-Letter Word	
October 2, 1968	Wild Season	
October 2, 1968	Coogan's Bluff	
October 16, 1968	The Pink Jungle	co-production with Cherokee Productions
October 23, 1968	Secret Ceremony	U.S. distribution only
November 27, 1968	Hellfighters	

== 1969 ==
Release date	Title	Notes
January 1, 1969	Strategy of Terror	re-edited from a two-part 1965 Kraft Suspense Theatre episode, "In Darkness, Waiting".
February 19, 1969	The Night of the Following Day	co-production Gina Production
February 1969	Better a Widow	American distribution
March 19, 1969	Can Heironymus Merkin Ever Forget Mercy Humppe and Find True Happiness?	British: co-production with Taralex
April 1, 1969	Sweet Charity	
April 2, 1969	Angel in My Pocket	
April 27, 1969	Isadora	American distribution
May 8, 1969	Death of a Gunfighter	
May 22, 1969	Winning	co-production with Newman-Foreman Company and Jennings Lang
May 26, 1969	Backtrack!	Compilation of several episodes of the TV series Laredo
June 18, 1969	Eye of the Cat	co-production with Joseph L. Schenck Enterprises
June 1969	A Degree of Murder	
June 1969	The Wise Guys	
July 11, 1969	The Lost Man	
August 28, 1969	Journey to the Far Side of the Sun	American distribution; co-production with Century 21 Television
August 1969	The Love God?	
September 14, 1969	House of Cards	co-production with Westward Films
September 23, 1969	The Adding Machine	co-production with Associated London Films
October 6, 1969	Three Into Two Won't Go	co-production with Julian Blaustein Productions Ltd.
November 12, 1969	Change of Habit	co-produced by NBC Productions
December 12, 1969	Tell Them Willie Boy Is Here	co-produced by Jennings Lang Productions and Philip A. Waxman Productions Inc.
December 18, 1969	Anne of the Thousand Days	British: co-production with Hal Wallis Productions; Nominee of the Academy Award for Best Picture. Winner of the Golden Globe Award for Best Motion Picture – Drama.
December 19, 1969	Topaz	

== See also ==
- List of Focus Features films
- List of Universal Pictures theatrical animated feature films
- Universal Pictures
- Category:Lists of films by studio
