= Clifford Stine =

American cinematographer (1906–1986)

Clifford Stine, A.S.C.
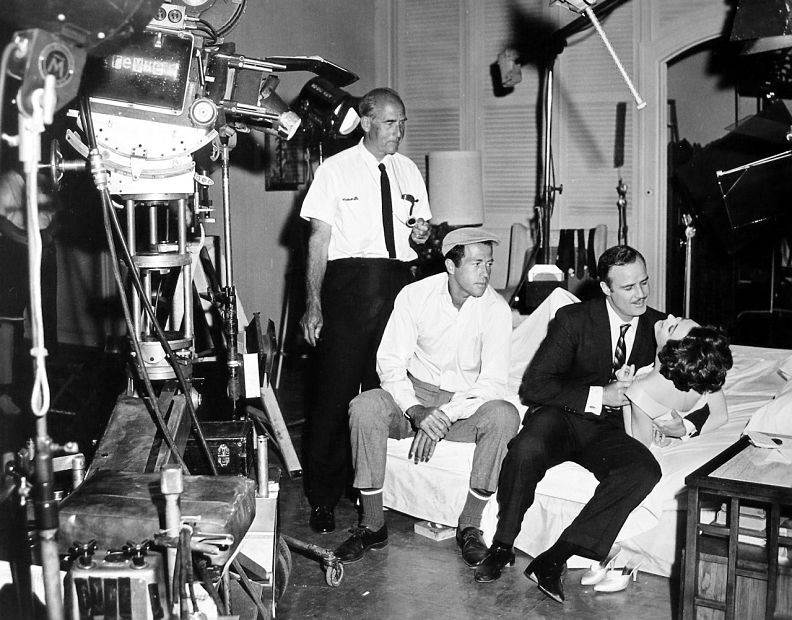
- Stine (left) with George Englund (director-producer), Marlon Brando and Sandra Church on the set of The Ugly American, 1963
- Born: Clifford Stine; March 24, 1906; California, US
- Died: December 12, 1986 (aged 80); Pomona, California, US
- Other name: Cliff Stine
- Occupation: Cinematographer
- Known for: Cinematography (special effects)

Clifford Stine, ASC (March 24, 1906 – December 12, 1986), was a cinematographer known for working on western and horror movies. He often received the unusual screen credit of 'special photography' for his special visual effects work such as The Incredible Shrinking Man.

== Filmography ==
- The Concorde ... Airport '79 (1979) [Special Photographer] (as Cliff Stine)
- The Hindenburg (1975) [Special Photography] (uncredited)
- Earthquake (1974) [Special Photography]
- Patton (1970) [Camera Operator: second unit]
- Rosie! (1967) [Cinematographer]
- The King's Pirate (1967) [Cinematographer]
- Gambit (1966) [Cinematographer]
- Follow Me, Boys! (1966) [Cinematographer] (director of photography)
- And Now Miguel (1966) [Cinematographer]
- That Funny Feeling (1965) [Cinematographer]
- Fluffy (1965) [Cinematographer]
- Bedtime Story (1964) [Cinematographer]
- The Brass Bottle (1964) [Cinematographer]
- The Creeping Terror (1964) [Special Photography]
- For Love or Money (1963) [Cinematographer]
- The Ugly American (1963) [Cinematographer]
- Tammy Tell Me True (1961) [Cinematographer]
- Posse from Hell (1961) [Cinematographer] (director of photography)
- Spartacus (1960) [Cinematographer: additional scenes]
- Hell Bent for Leather (1960) [Cinematographer]
- Operation Petticoat (1959) [Special Photography]
- Pillow Talk (1959) [Special Photography]
- This Earth Is Mine (1959) [Special Photography]
- The Wild and the Innocent (1959) [Special Photography]
- Imitation of Life (1959) [Special Photography]
- A Stranger in My Arms (1959) [Special Photography]
- Monster on the Campus (1958) [Special Photography]
- The Perfect Furlough (1958) [Special Photography]
- The Restless Years (1958) [Special Photography]
- Once Upon a Horse... (1958) [Special Photography]
- Step Down to Terror (1958) [Special Photography]
- Kathy O' (1958) [Special Photography]
- Voice in the Mirror (1958) [Special Photography]
- Twilight for the Gods (1958) [Special Photography]
- A Time to Love and a Time to Die (1958) [Special Photography] [Special Effects]
- The Thing That Couldn't Die (1958) [Special Photography]
- This Happy Feeling (1958) [Special Photography]
- Flood Tide (1958) [Special Photography]
- Live Fast, Die Young (1958) [Special Photography]
- Touch of Evil (1958) [Camera Operator: additional photography] (uncredited)
- Run Silent Run Deep (1958) [Special Photographic Effects]
- Summer Love (1958) [Cinematographer]
- The Lady Takes a Flyer (1958) [Special Photography]
- The Female Animal (1958) [Special Photography]
- The Tarnished Angels (1958) [Special Photography] [Special Effects]
- War of the Planets (1958) [Cinematographer]
- The Monolith Monsters (1957) [Special Photographic Effects]
- Slaughter on Tenth Avenue (1957) [Special Photography]
- The Land Unknown (1957) [Special Photography]
- Man of a Thousand Faces (1957) [Special Photographic Effects]
- Night Passage (1957) [Special Camera]
- The Midnight Story (1957) [Special Photography]
- The Deadly Mantis (1957) [Special Photographer]
- The Kettles on Old MacDonald's Farm (1957) [Special Photographic Effects]
- Kelly and Me (1957) [Special Photography]
- The Tattered Dress (1957) [Special Photography]
- Mister Cory (1957) [Special Effects]
- The Incredible Shrinking Man (1957) [Special Photography]
- Battle Hymn (1957) [Special Photography]
- Four Girls in Town (1957) [Special Photography]
- Istanbul (1957) [Special Photography]
- The Mole People (1956) [Special Photography]
- Written on the Wind (1956) [Special Photography]
- The Unguarded Moment (1956) [Special Photography]
- Walk the Proud Land (1956) [Special Photography]
- Away All Boats (1956) [Special Photography]
- I've Lived Before (1956) [Special Photography]
- Congo Crossing (1956) [Special Photography]
- Francis in the Haunted House (1956) [Special Effects]
- Outside the Law (1956) [Special Effects Photographer]
- The Creature Walks Among Us (1956) [Special Photography]
- Raw Edge (1956) [Special Photography]
- The Price of Fear (1956) [Special Photography]
- The Square Jungle (1955) [Special Photography]
- Tarantula (1955) [Special Photography]
- The Second Greatest Sex (1955) [Special Photography]
- Abbott and Costello Meet the Mummy (1955) [Special Photographic Effects]
- The Purple Mask (1955) [Special Photography]
- This Island Earth (1955) [Cinematographer] [Special Photography]
- Ma and Pa Kettle at Waikiki (1955) [Cinematographer]
- Smoke Signal (1955) [Cinematographer] (director of photography)
- Fireman Save My Child (1954) [Cinematographer]
- Wings of the Hawk (1953) [Cinematographer]
- East of Sumatra (1953) [Cinematographer]
- Abbott and Costello Go to Mars (1953) [Cinematographer]
- Law and Order (1953) [Cinematographer]
- It Came from Outer Space (1953) [Cinematographer]
- Back at the Front (1952) [Cinematographer]
- Has Anybody Seen My Gal (1952) [Cinematographer]
- No Room for the Groom (1952) [Cinematographer]
- Bronco Buster (1952) [Cinematographer]
- Week-End with Father (1951) [Cinematographer]
- Air Cadet (1951) [Cinematographer] (director of photography) (as Cliff Stine)
- Mystery Submarine (1950) [Cinematographer]
- Never a Dull Moment (1950) [Process Photography]
- The Milkman (1950) [Cinematographer] (as Cliff Stine)
- Born to Be Bad (1950) [Cinematographer: additional scenes]
- Once a Thief (1950) [Process Photographer] (uncredited)
- Racket Squad (1950) TV Series [Cinematographer]
- The Clay Pigeon (1949) [Special Effects]
- The Miracle of the Bells (1948) [Special Effects]
- Step by Step (1946) [Special Effects]
- Gunga Din (1939) [Second Camera: camera effects] (uncredited)
- The Gay Divorcee (1934) [Assistant Camera] (uncredited)
- The Son of Kong (1933) [Camera Operator] (uncredited)
- King Kong (1933) [Second Assistant Camera: "b" camera] (uncredited) [Special Effects Cameraman] (uncredited)
