= Hell Bent for Leather (film) =

1960 film by George Sherman

- Original film poster
- Directed by: George Sherman
- Screenplay by: Christopher Knopf
- Based on: Outlaw Marshal by Ray Hogan
- Produced by: Gordon Kay
- Starring: Audie Murphy; Felicia Farr; Stephen McNally; Robert Middleton
- Cinematography: Clifford Stine
- Edited by: Milton Carruth
- Music by: Irving Gertz; William Lava
- Color process: Eastmancolor
- Production company: Universal Pictures
- Distributed by: Universal Pictures
- Release date: February 1, 1960
- Running time: 82 minutes
- Country: United States
- Language: English
- Budget: $500,000

Hell Bent for Leather is a 1960 American CinemaScope Western film directed by George Sherman and starring Audie Murphy, Felicia Farr, Stephen McNally and Robert Middleton. The film was based on the 1959 novel Outlaw Marshal by Ray Hogan and filmed on location in the Alabama Hills of Lone Pine, California.

== Plot ==
Clay Santell has his horse stolen and stops in the town of Sutterville. He is mistaken by townspeople for a murderer named Travers, and is handed over to Marshal Harry Deckett.

Deckett knows the truth but decides to kill Clay and pass him off as the real Travers to enhance his reputation and collect the reward money. Clay escapes and takes a woman hostage until he can prove his innocence.

== Cast ==
- Audie Murphy as Clay
- Felicia Farr as Janet
- Stephen McNally as Deckett
- Robert Middleton as Ambrose
- James Westmoreland as Moon
- Jan Merlin as Travers
- Herbert Rudley as Perrick
- Malcolm Atterbury as Gamble
- Joseph Ruskin as Shad
- Allan Lane as Kelsey
- John Qualen as Old Ben
- Eddie Little Sky as William
- Steve Gravers as Grover
- Beau Gentry as Stone
- Bob Steele as Jared

== Production ==
The film was the first of seven low-budget Westerns Audie Murphy made for producer Gordon Kay at Universal. They would be shot in 18–20 days at a budget of around $500,000, and normally feature only three main roles: the hero (played by Murphy), female lead, and villain. The other films were:

- Seven Ways from Sundown (1960)
- Posse from Hell (1961)
- Six Black Horses (1962)
- Showdown (1963)
- Bullet for a Badman (1964)
- Gunpoint (1966)

== See also ==
- List of American films of 1960
