= Winifred Wolfe =

American novelist and television writer (1923-1981)

Winifred Wolfe (1923–1981) was an American novelist, playwright, and television writer best known as the author of the novels Ask Any Girl (1958) and If a Man Answers (1960). She was head writer of the television soap operas As the World Turns and Somerset during the 1970s.

== Life ==
Wolfe was born in Boston, Massachusetts in 1923 and died in New York City in October 1981. She was married to Jack Gordun, a theatrical agent and producer. The couple had one son, Douglas Gordun.

== Works ==
=== Novels and short stories ===
Wolfe's best known novels were Ask Any Girl (1958) and If a Man Answers (1960), both of which were made in to romantic comedy films. Ask Any Girl (1959) was directed by Charles Walters and starred David Niven, Shirley McLaine and Gigi Young. If a Man Answers (1962) was directed by Henry Levin and featured actors Sandra Dee, Bobby Darin and Micheline Presle.

Other novels by Wolfe include Yesterday's Child, Josie's Way, and Occupant Penthouse A. She also published more than thirty short stories in magazines such as Good Housekeeping and Cosmopolitan.

=== Plays ===
Wolfe wrote two plays, titled Three Stories High and Man on the Stairs. Her novels Ask Any Girl and If a Man Answers were adapted into plays by Christopher Sergel and David Rogers, respectively.

=== Television and radio ===
Wolfe worked as a writer of radio soap operas before transitioning to television. She was head writer of As the World Turns from 1970 to 1971 and head writer of Somerset from 1974 to 1975. Wolfe also wrote episodes of Lux Video Theatre, The Elgin Hour and The Frank Sinatra Show and was the creator of the television drama series High Hopes.
