= Harry Keller =

American film director

Harry Keller (February 22, 1913 – January 19, 1987) was an American film editor, producer and director, who made a number of westerns and worked for many years at Republic Pictures and Universal Pictures.

In 1958, Keller was tasked by Universal Pictures with directing re-shoots and additional scenes on the Orson Welles film Touch of Evil.

== Select Credits ==
- The Witness Vanishes (1939) editor
- Inside Information (1939)
- Mystery of the White Room (1939)
- Black Hills Express (1943) editor
- Days of Old Cheyenne (1943) editor
- Sheriff of Sundown (1944) editor
- Northwest Outpost (1947) editor
- Moonrise (1948) editor
- The Blonde Bandit (1949) director
- The Red Menace (1949) editor
- The Arizona Cowboy (1950) editor
- Tarnished (1950) director
- Fort Dodge Stampede (1951) assoc. producer
- Desert of Lost Men (1951) associ. producer
- Belle Le Grand (1951) director
- The Dakota Kid (1951) editor
- Thundering Caravans (1952) director
- Black Hills (1952) assoc. producer
- Rose of Cimarron (1952) director
- Leadville Gunslinger (1952) assoc. producer
- Marshal of Cedar Rock (1953) director
- Bandits of the West (1963) director
- Savage Frontier (1953) director
- El Paso Stampede (1953) director
- Red River Shore (1953) director
- Phantom Stallion (1954) assoc. producer
- The Unguarded Moment (1956) director
- Man Afraid (1957) director
- Quantez (1957) director
- The Female Animal (1958) director
- Day of the Badman (1958) director
- Voice in the Mirror (1958) director
- Touch of Evil (1958) - director, additional scenes and re-shoots
- Step Down to Terror (1958) director
- Texas John Slaughter (1960) director
- Seven Ways from Sundown (1960) director
- Tammy Tell Me True (1961) director
- Six Black Horses (1962) director
- Tammy and the Doctor (1963) director
- The Brass Bottle (1964) director
- Kitten with a Whip (1964) producer
- Send Me No Flowers (1964) producer
- Mirage (1965) producer
- That Funny Feeling (1965) producer
- Texas Across the River (1966) producer
- In Enemy Country (1968) producer
- Skin Game (1971) producer
