= That Funny Feeling =

1965 film by Richard Thorpe

- Directed by: Richard Thorpe
- Screenplay by: David R. Schwartz
- Story by: Norman Barasch; Carroll Moore
- Produced by: Harry Keller
- Starring: Sandra Dee; Bobby Darin; Donald O'Connor
- Cinematography: Clifford Stine
- Edited by: Gene Milford
- Music by: Bobby Darin
- Production company: Universal Pictures
- Distributed by: Universal Pictures
- Release date: August 25, 1965 (US)
- Running time: 93 minutes
- Country: United States
- Language: English
- Box office: $1,000,000 (rentals)

That Funny Feeling is a 1965 American romantic comedy film directed by Richard Thorpe and starring Sandra Dee, Bobby Darin, and Donald O'Connor.

This was the third film pairing of Dee and then-husband Darin, following 1961's Come September and 1962's If a Man Answers. It was the second film that O'Connor and Kathleen Freeman (who played a lady waiting to use a telephone booth) made together, the first being Singin' in the Rain.

== Plot ==
Joan Howell intends to be an actress, but for now she's working as a maid.

On three different occasions, she and Tom Milford - a successful publishing executive, and womanizer - accidentally bump into each other. The third time, Tom asks her for a date.

Ashamed of her own modest home, which she shares with her aspiring-actress friend Audrey, Joan invites him to the lavish apartment of one of her clients - whom she believes is out of town for a couple of weeks - pretending it's hers. What she doesn't know, because she and her employer have never met, is that the apartment is Tom's.

He's shocked to find himself being welcomed to his own place. To see how far Joan's prepared to go, Tom moves in with his pal Harvey - who has his own concerns about Joan to do with his acrimonious divorce and property he's 'hiding' from his wife at Tom's place - and goes along with her ruse. As soon as Joan becomes aware of the truth, however, she gets even by inviting all Tom's previous conquests, dressed as prostitutes, to a party which the cops promptly raid.

In the police van on the way to the station, Tom proposes to Joan and Audrey flirts with a receptive Harvey.

== Cast ==
- Sandra Dee as Joan Howell
- Bobby Darin as Tom Milford
- Donald O'Connor as Harvey Granson
- Nita Talbot as Audrey
- Larry Storch as Luther
- Leo G. Carroll as Mr. O'Shee, Pawnbroker
- James Westerfield as Office Brokaw
- Robert Strauss as Bartender
- Ben Lessy as Charlie the Bartender
- Reta Shaw, Nora Marlowe, Kathleen Freeman, and Minerva Urecal as the women at phone booth
- Arte Johnson as Paul
- Benny Rubin as Taxi Driver
- Aki Hara as Hatacki
- Don Haggerty as Policeman
- Larry J. Blake as Policeman (as Larry Blake)
- Herb Vigran as Taxi Driver (uncredited)
- Smoki Whitfield as Police Sergeant (as Jordan Whitfield) (uncredited)

== Home media ==
Universal first released the film on DVD on August 3, 2004. It was re-released on February 7, 2017, as part of Universal's 4-Movie Laugh Pack DVD series, being packaged with 3 other films starring Sandra Dee (If a Man Answers, Tammy Tell Me True, and Tammy and the Doctor).

== See also ==
- List of American films of 1965
