= Stranger in My Arms =

1959 film by Helmut Käutner

A Stranger in My Arms
- Film poster by Reynold Brown
- Directed by: Helmut Kautner
- Written by: Peter Berneis
- Based on: And Ride a Tiger (novel) by Robert Wilder
- Produced by: Ross Hunter
- Starring: June Allyson; Jeff Chandler; Sandra Dee; Charles Coburn; Mary Astor; Peter Graves; Conrad Nagel
- Cinematography: William Daniels
- Edited by: Frank Gross
- Music by: Joseph Gershenson
- Production company: Universal Pictures
- Distributed by: Universal Pictures
- Release date: March 3, 1959 (United States)
- Running time: 88 minutes
- Country: United States
- Language: English

A Stranger in My Arms (also known as And Ride a Tiger) is a 1959 American CinemaScope drama film directed by Helmut Käutner and starring June Allyson, Jeff Chandler, Sandra Dee, Charles Coburn, Mary Astor and Peter Graves.

== Plot ==
A Korean War test pilot Major, Pike Yarnell, survives a jet crash in the Pacific Ocean, as does his navigator Donald Beasley. After 12 days on a raft, Donald dies, but Pike is rescued.

Christina, the dead officer's widow, waits for a full explanation of the circumstances of her husband's death, as do his wealthy Georgia parents and sister. Pike gives them very few details, however, particularly disturbing Virginie Beasley, who wants a Congressman in the family to seek a Medal of Honor for her brave son.

Pike begins to develop feelings for Christina. He cannot bring himself to tell her that Donald was actually a poor officer and under investigation. During the ocean flight, his navigational mistake led to the crash. While on the raft, Donald proved to be a coward. Donald revealed near the end that he never loved his wife and hated his mother. Ultimately, he used Pike's gun to kill himself.

Christina, who is expected to spend the rest of her life in pious mourning for her hero husband, finds the courage to leave town with Major Yarnell and start a new life.

== Cast ==
- June Allyson as Christina Beasley
- Jeff Chandler as Major Pike Yarnell
- Sandra Dee as Pat Beasley
- Charles Coburn as Vance Beasley
- Mary Astor as Mrs. Virginie Beasley
- Peter Graves as Donald Beasley
- Conrad Nagel as Harley Beasley
- Hayden Rorke as Marcus Beasley
- Reita Green as Bessie Logan
- Bartlett Robinson as Colonel Bert Wayne
- Howard Wendell as Congressman

== Production ==
The film was based on the novel And Ride a Tiger by Robert Wilder, author of Written on the Wind. It was published in 1951. The New York Times wrote the book had "some dubious motivation" but was "so racily readable that you are not particularly bothered until you've stopped turning pages."

Film rights were bought by Pamrick Productions, the company of star June Allyson and her husband, former actor turned producer and director, Dick Powell. They announced they would make the film in 1956 with financing through RKO Studios.

RKO ceased functioning as a financier of films, however, and the project transferred over to producer Ross Hunter at Universal-International, who had enjoyed a big hit with Written on the Wind (1956). Allyson was attached as star, but the director was Helmut Kautner, who had just made The Restless Years (1958) for Universal. Jeff Chandler was given the male lead.

The film's cast also included Mary Astor and Sandra Dee, the latter having signed a long-term contract with Universal. Filming started December 1957.

Principal photography on A Stranger in My Arms took place from late November 1958 to early January 1959. The aircraft used included Lockheed T-33, Lockheed P-80A Shooting Star, North American CB-25J Mitchell and North American F-86A Sabre.

== Reception ==
In film critic Bosley Crowther's review of A Stranger in My Arms for The New York Times, he noted: "A selfish, possessive mother is the squeaky hub around which turns a small wheel of conventional drama in Stranger in My Arms, a Universal-International picture that came to the Odeon yesterday. And a peevish and snarling Mary Astor turns up in the role. The accompanying emotional rotation, which is conspicuously ponderous and slow, is flattering neither to Miss Astor nor to the common concept of Mom."

== See also ==
- List of American films of 1959
