= If a Man Answers =

1962 film by Henry Levin

If A Man Answers
- Theatrical release poster
- Directed by: Henry Levin
- Screenplay by: Richard Morris
- Based on: If a Man Answers by Winifred Wolfe
- Produced by: Ross Hunter
- Starring: Sandra Dee; Bobby Darin; Micheline Presle; John Lund
- Cinematography: Russell Metty
- Edited by: Milton Carruth
- Music by: Bobby Darin; Hans J. Salter
- Production company: Universal Pictures
- Distributed by: Universal International
- Release date: October 10, 1962 (USA)
- Running time: 102 minutes
- Country: United States
- Language: English
- Box office: $2 million (US/Canada)

If a Man Answers is a 1962 American romantic comedy film directed by Henry Levin and stars then real-life husband-and-wife Bobby Darin and Sandra Dee. It was produced by Ross Hunter Productions, Inc, shot in Eastman color, and distributed by Universal-International. The screenplay was written by Richard Morris from a novel by Winifred Wolfe.

== Plot ==
Chantal Stacy is a very cute girl who is the daughter of Germaine Stacy, a former French showgirl, and John Stacy, a conservative Boston antiques dealer, who met in Paris. Chantal was the product of their "soufflé-and-beans romance." Her father worries about her French side leading her into pregnancy before her Boston side finds a husband; a foghorn sounds every time a man gets too close to her.

Her father gets a promotion and the family moves to New York City. Chantal gets picked up on Fifth Avenue by Eugene "Gene" Wright, a photographer who invites her to model for him. During Chantal's first shoot, her father shows up to the set, punches Gene, after seeing the skimpy outfit Chantal is modeling in, and takes his daughter home. Chantal admits to her mother that she likes Gene and wants to continue modeling for him without John's interference; with her mother's advice, she marries Gene. However, now that she is his wife, Gene refuses to let Chantal model, effectively making her a housewife.

Shortly after their marriage, Chantal's college friend Tina arrives in New York. A spoiled rich girl, she goes after Gene, and he responds positively to Tina's flirting tactics, making Chantal start to become nervous about her marriage. When Chantal is at a loss, her mother gives her a book on "How To Train Man's Best Friend" and advises Chantal that many men aren't treated as well as pets. She begins to use the dog-training techniques from the book on her husband and to her delight, the results are astounding. Germaine later explains that the book was not really for Chantel to train her husband to obey her like a dog but rather, it has been teaching her how to live with her husband.

Tina continues to stir up trouble, by admitting in a drunken stupor that she is desperately lonely and envious of Chantal's marriage and telling Gene about the dog-training book. In response, Chantal's mother suggests another trick she used to keep her father interested: taking a lover. Chantal is shocked at first, but Germaine says that her lover, "Robert Swan," was only imaginary. She kept up the act by sending herself flowers and having her girlfriends call and hang up "if a man answers" the phone, resulting in making her husband jealous. All of this is confirmed when the girls ask John about his accounts. Before Chantal leaves to go home to try out these techniques, her mother tells her that whenever Gene confronts her, she needs to respond honestly; this would make him wonder if his wife is really telling the truth about having an affair (despite being told all about the trick, John still genuinely wonders if Robert Swan exists).

All of this seems to work, after Chantal periodically sends herself two-dozen white roses and has her mom call in and click the receiver when Gene picks up the phone. Eventually, Gene goes to the florist to track down Robert Swan. Chantel goes to explain the entire situation, but Gene still pleads with her to end her affair, making her wonder why her mother's old tactics did not turn out as planned. To add to her confusion, Gene actually invites a "Robert Swan" to dinner and then asks him to move in and share Chantal in a polyandrous relationship. Chantal, in disbelief, phones her mother about the situation. Shocked, Chantal's mother and father come over to meet the fantasy man that has been sprung to life. Her father's suspicions that Robert Swan is a living person all the more real.

After snooping around Swan's luggage and some thought, Chantal realizes Swan is actually Gene's father, Adam Wright, acting the role of her (and her mother's former) lover. She and her mother decide to play along, turning the tables on the men for a few moments. Germaine finds out from John that he, Gene, and Adam were all in on the "Swan" act from the very beginning, to which she "admits defeat" and commends her husband for "being loyal to his sex." In the end, they all reconcile, and it is revealed that Chantal is pregnant, just as Chantal's mother suspected.

== Cast ==
- Sandra Dee as Chantal "Chouchou/Charlotte/Charlie" Stacy
- Bobby Darin as Eugene "Gene" Wright
- Micheline Presle as Germaine Stacy
- John Lund as John Stacy
- Cesar Romero as Robert Swan/Adam Wright
- Stefanie Powers as Tina
- Christopher Knight as Richard
- Ted Thorpe as the florist
- Roger Bacon as Messenger
- John Bleifer as Mr. Riordan, the Tobacconist
- Pamela Searle as Model
- Warrene Ott as Rita
- Dani Lynn as Bunny
- Charlene Holt as Lisa, Model
- Gloria Camacho as Model
- Edmay Van Dyke as Model
- Rosalee Calvert as Model

The role of the Model was played by real-life beauty queen Pamela Searle. In 1959 she was crowned Miss England, and later came in third in the Miss Universe contest.

== Production ==
The film was based on a novel by Winifred Wolfe published in 1961. The New York Times called it "too cute to be clever." Film rights were bought by Universal. In March 1961, producer Ross Hunter assigned Richard Morris to write the script. Morris had never written a script before and was best known for doing the lyrics on The Unsinkable Molly Brown.

In August 1961, Hunter announced the film would star Nancy Kwan, Claudette Colbert and David Niven. In October, Tammy Grimes was being discussed for the star. However, the lead role eventually went to Sandra Dee who made it after the birth of her child. By December, Dee's co star was Bobby Darin. Filming started February 1962.

== Reception ==
Philip K. Scheuer criticized the score in a review for the Los Angeles Times.

"The fun is widely scattered," wrote Variety.

A. H. Weiler, in a review for the New York Times, stated, "If a Man Answers is an airy antic that would not hurt a dog but appears to be fashioned for the young in mind as well as the young in heart."

== Awards ==
This comedy was nominated for a Golden Globe for Best Motion Picture (Comedy) and Best Supporting Actor (Cesar Romero). It was also nominated for a Golden Laurel for Top Female Comedy Performance (Sandra Dee).

== Home media availability ==
Universal first released the film on DVD on August 3, 2004. It was re-released on February 7, 2017, as part of Universal's 4-Movie Laugh Pack DVD series, being packaged with 3 other films starring Sandra Dee (That Funny Feeling, Tammy Tell Me True, and Tammy and the Doctor).
