= Sandra Dee =

American actress and model (1942–2005)

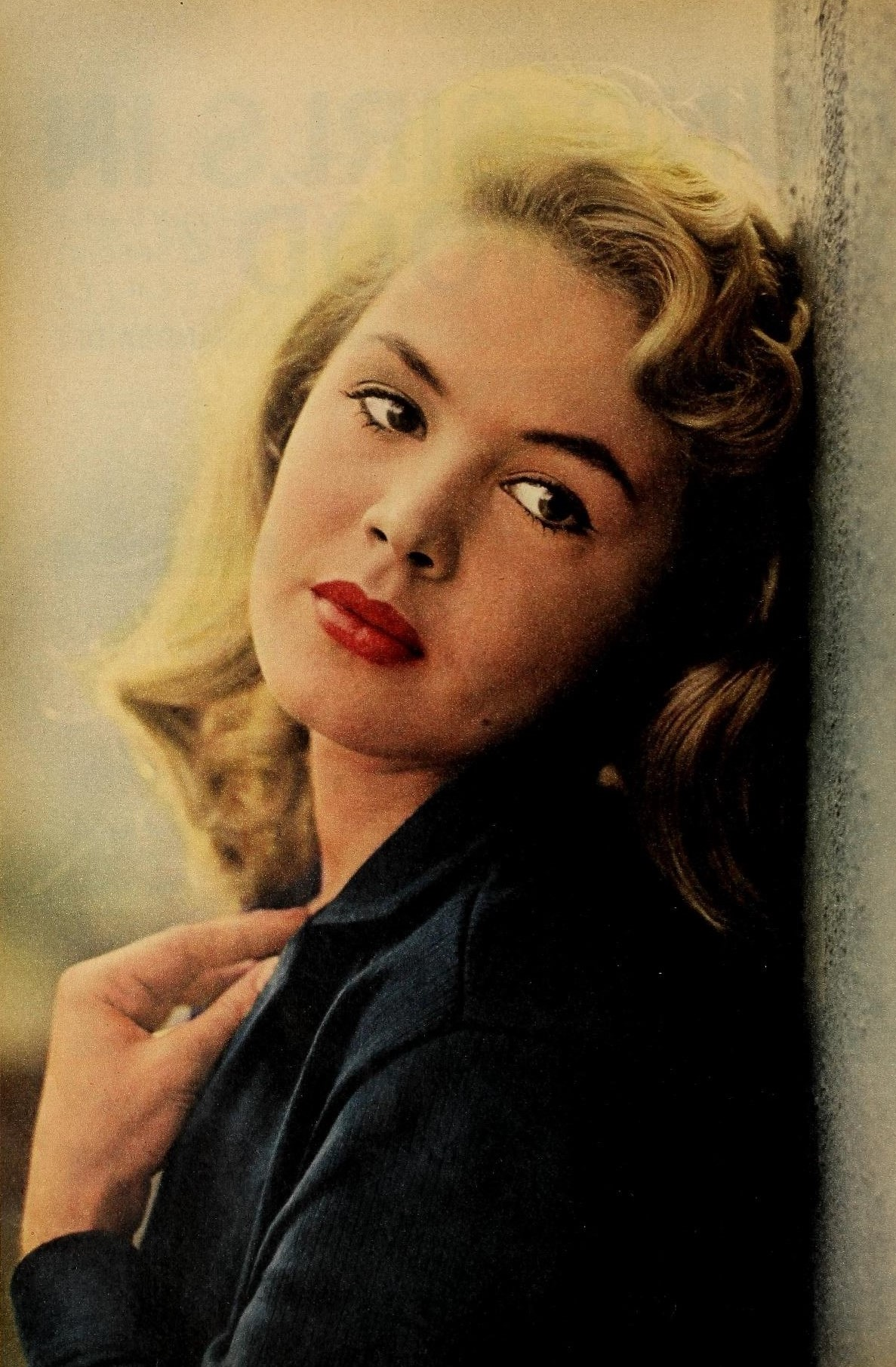
- Dee in 1959
- Born: Alexandra Zuck; April 23, 1942; Bayonne, New Jersey, U.S.
- Died: February 20, 2005 (aged 62); Thousand Oaks, California, U.S.
- Resting place: Forest Lawn Memorial Park
- Other name: Sandra Douvan
- Education: Professional Children's School
- Occupations: Actress; model
- Years active: 1957–1983
- Known for: Imitation of Life; Until They Sail; Gidget; A Summer Place; Take Her She's Mine; The Reluctant Debutante; Tammy Tell Me True; If a Man Answers
- Spouse: Bobby Darin (m. 1960; div. 1967)
- Children: 1

Sandra Dee (born Alexandra Zuck; April 23, 1942 – February 20, 2005) was an American actress. Dee began her career as a child model, working first in commercials and then film in her teenage years. Best known for her portrayal of ingénues, Dee earned a Golden Globe Award as one of the year's most promising newcomers for her performance in Robert Wise's Until They Sail (1957). She became a teenage star for her performances in Imitation of Life, Gidget and A Summer Place (all released in 1959), which made her a household name.

Dee's acting career waned in the late 1960s. In 1967, her highly publicized marriage to Bobby Darin ended in divorce and Universal Pictures dropped her contract. Dee appeared in the 1970 independent horror film The Dunwich Horror and occasionally in television productions throughout the 1970s and early 1980s. In later life, Dee sought help for depression, alcoholism, and faced traumas from her childhood, including sexual abuse by her stepfather. She died in 2005 of complications from kidney disease.

== Life and career ==
=== 1942–1951: Early life ===
Dee was born Alexandra Zuck on April 23, 1942, in Bayonne, New Jersey, the only child of John Zuck and Mary (née Cimboliak) Zuck, who met as teenagers at a Russian Orthodox Church dance. They married shortly afterward, but divorced before Dee was five years old. She was of Carpatho-Rusyn ancestry and raised in the Orthodox faith; her son, Dodd Darin, wrote in his biographical book about his parents titled Dream Lovers that Dee's mother Mary and her aunt Olga [later Olga Duda] "were first generation daughters of a working-class Russian Orthodox couple", and Dee recalled, "we belonged to a Russian Orthodox church, and there was dancing at the social events." She soon adopted the name Sandra Dee, became a professional model by the age of four and progressed to television commercials.

According to her son's book, Dee was born in 1944, but she and her mother falsely inflated her age by two years to find more work modeling and acting, which she began at a very young age. Legal records, including her California divorce record from Bobby Darin, as well as the Social Security Death Index and her own cryptstone all give her year of birth as 1942. In a 1967 interview with the Oxnard Press-Courier, she acknowledged being 18 in 1960 when she first met Darin, whom she wed three months later.

Dee's parents divorced in 1950 and, a year later, her mother married Russia-born Eugene Victor Douvan (1898–1956), who reportedly sexually abused Dee after he married her mother. He died of heart ailments in 1956, aged 57, after being taken from NYC to Georgetown Hospital in Washington D.C. for treatment. Douvan's application for citizenship reveals his history of emigrating to the USA, using aliases (Eugene George Stewart and Frederick Von Bergner), and that he was living in Roosevelt, Nassau County New York at the time of the application. Various ads which he placed in Bayonne newspapers advertised he was available for construction and real estate work. He had two sons by a previous marriage. He was living in Bayonne with his son Robert in the 1950s. His older son had lived in Chicago and Michigan.

=== 1952–1956: Modeling career ===
Producer Ross Hunter claimed to have discovered Dee on Park Avenue in New York City with her mother when she was 12 years old. In a 1959 interview, Dee recalled that she "grew up fast," surrounded mostly by older people, and was "never held back in anything [she] wanted to do."

During her modeling career, Dee attempted to lose weight to "be as skinny as the high-fashion models", although an improper diet "ruined [her] skin, hair, nails—everything." Having lost weight, her body was unable to digest any food that she ate, and it took the help of a doctor to regain her health. According to Dee, she "could have killed [herself]" and "had to learn to eat all over again." Despite the damaging effects on her health, Dee earned $75,000 in 1956 (equivalent to $890,000 in 2025) working as a child model in New York, which she used to support herself and her mother after the death of her stepfather in 1956. According to sources, Dee's large modeling salary was more than what she would later earn as an actress. While modeling in New York, she attended the Professional Children's School.

=== 1957–1958: Early films and Universal contract ===
Ending her modeling career, Dee moved from New York to Hollywood in 1957. She graduated from University High School in Los Angeles in June 1958 at age 16. Her onscreen debut was in the 1957 MGM film Until They Sail, directed by Robert Wise. To promote the film, Dee appeared in a December issue of Modern Screen in a column by Louella Parsons, who praised Dee and compared her appearance and talent to those of Shirley Temple. Dee's performance made her one of that year's winners of the Golden Globe Award for New Star of the Year – Actress.

MGM cast Dee as the female lead in The Reluctant Debutante (1958), with John Saxon as her romantic costar. It was the first of several films in which Dee appeared with Saxon. She provided the voice of Gerda for the English dub of The Snow Queen (1957). The stress of her newfound success and the effects of sexual abuse, caused Dee to struggle with chronic anorexia nervosa, and her kidneys temporarily failed.

In 1958, Dee signed with Universal Pictures and was one of the company's last contract players prior to the dissolution of the studio system. She had a lead role in The Restless Years (1958) for producer Ross Hunter, opposite Saxon and Teresa Wright. She followed this with another film for Hunter, A Stranger in My Arms (1959).

=== 1959–1965: Stardom ===
Dee's third film for Hunter was of greater impact than the first two: Imitation of Life (1959), starring Lana Turner. The film became a box-office success, grossing more than $50 million. It was the highest-grossing film in Universal's history and made Dee a household name. She was lent to Columbia Pictures to play the title role in the teenage beach comedy Gidget (1959), which was a solid hit, helping spawn the beach party genre and leading to two sequels, two television series and two television movies (although Dee did not appear in any of those).

Universal next cast Dee as a tomboy opposite Audie Murphy in the Western romantic comedy The Wild and the Innocent (1959). Warner Bros. borrowed her for another melodrama in the vein of Imitation of Life, A Summer Place (1959), opposite Troy Donahue as her romantic costar. The film was a massive hit, and that year American box office exhibitors voted Dee the 16th-most popular star in the country.

Hunter reunited Dee with Turner and Saxon in Universal's Portrait in Black (1960), a thriller that was a financial success despite receiving harsh reviews. Dee was listed as the nation's seventh-greatest star at the end of 1960. Peter Ustinov cast her as the lead in the Cold War comedy Romanoff and Juliet (1961) with Universal's new heartthrob John Gavin, reuniting them from Imitation of Life.

Dee and Gavin played together again in Hunter's popular Tammy Tell Me True (1961), in which Dee took the Tammy role originated by Debbie Reynolds. In Come September (1961), she worked with Bobby Darin in his film debut (following a cameo in an earlier film). Dee and Darin married after filming, on December 1, 1960. On December 16, 1961, she gave birth to their son, her only child, Dodd Mitchell Darin (also known as Morgan Mitchell Darin).

In 1961, Dee, with three years remaining on her Universal contract, signed a new one for seven years. Dee and Darin appeared together in the Hunter romantic comedy If a Man Answers (1962). In 1963, she appeared in the final Tammy film, Tammy and the Doctor, and the hit comedy Take Her, She's Mine, playing a character loosely based on Nora Ephron. That year, she was voted the eighth-greatest star in the country, but it was her last appearance in the top 10. Dee appeared in I'd Rather Be Rich (1964), a musical remake of It Started with Eve, once again for Hunter. She was reunited with Darin in That Funny Feeling (1965) before appearing in her last film at Universal under her contract with the spy comedy A Man Could Get Killed (1966).

Dee was also a singer and recorded some singles in the early 1960s, including a cover version of "When I Fall in Love".

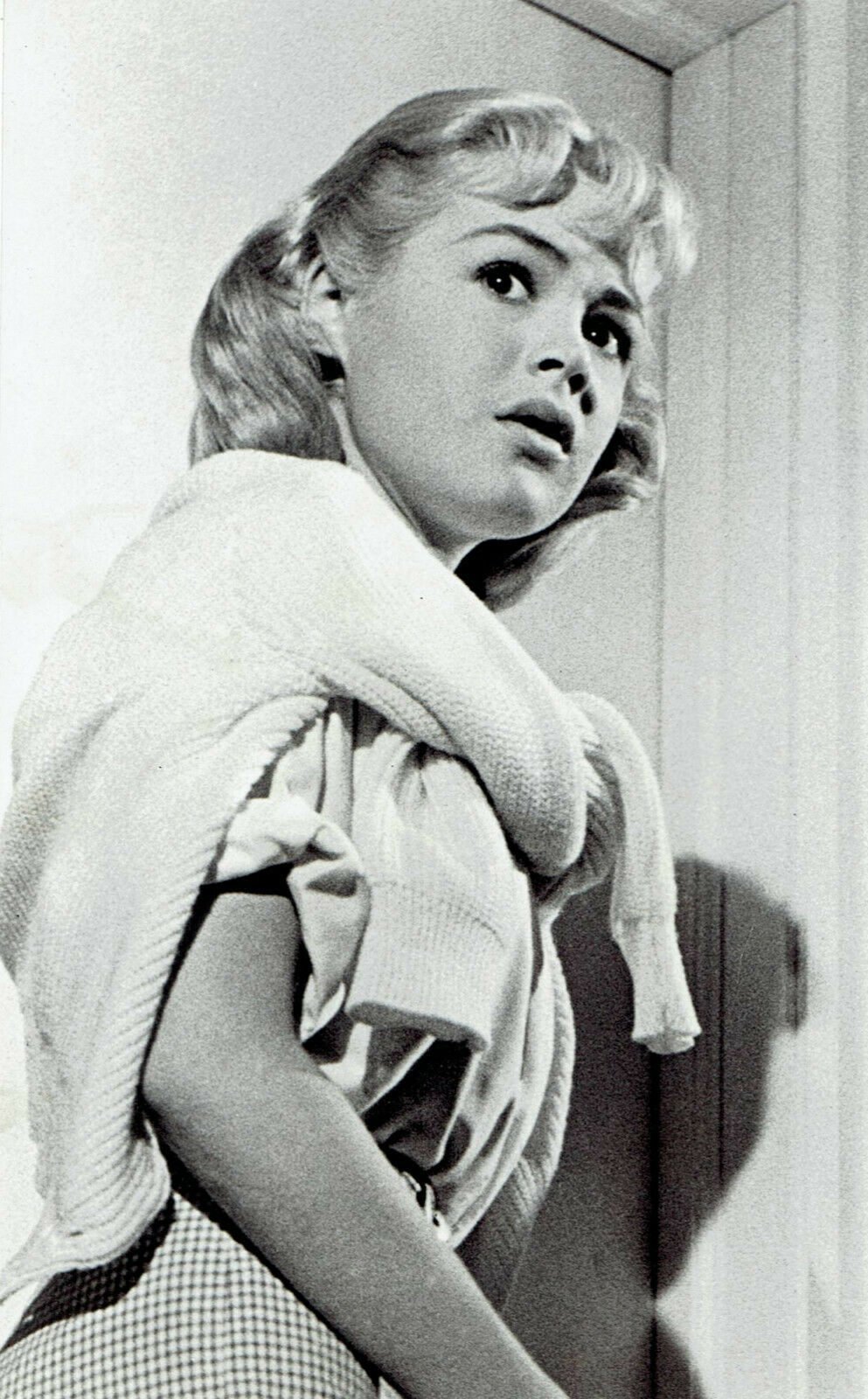
Dee in Imitation of Life (1959)

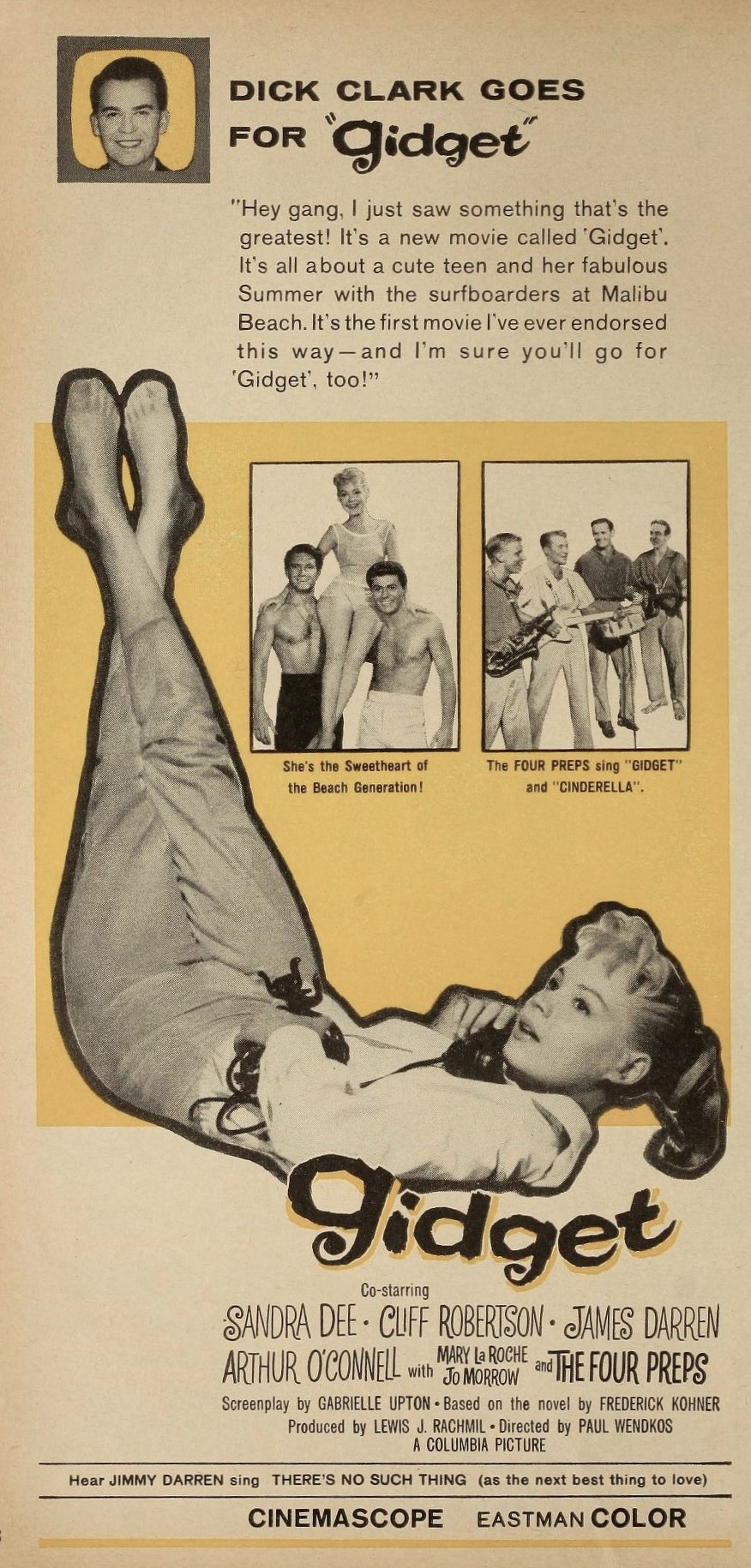
The original Gidget (1959)

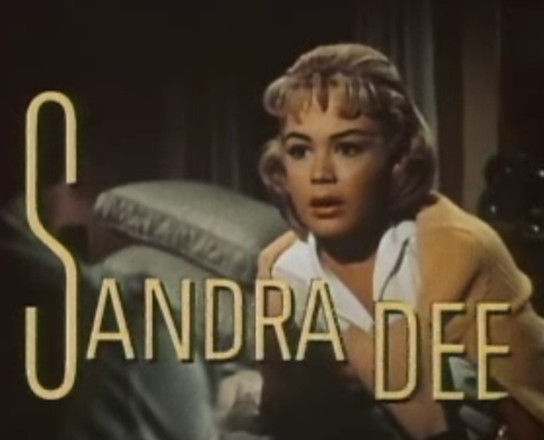
Imitation of Life in 1959

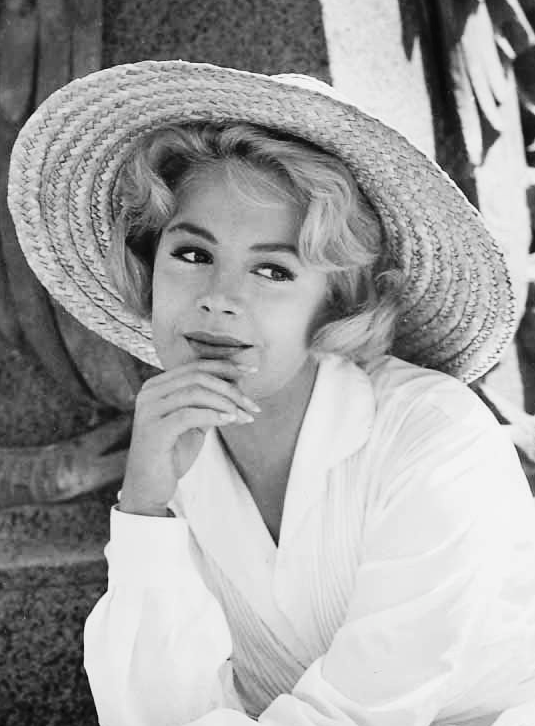
Dee in Romanoff and Juliet (1961)

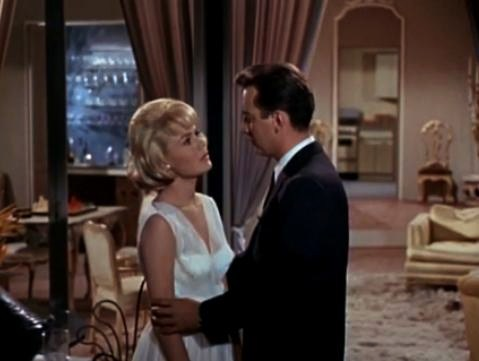
Dee with Bobby Darin in That Funny Feeling (1965)

=== 1966–1983: Career decline and later roles ===
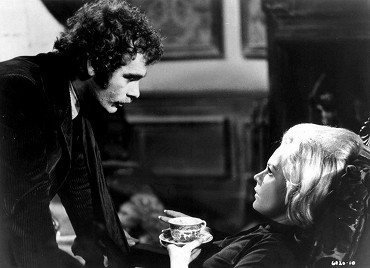
Dee and Dean Stockwell in The Dunwich Horror (1970)

By the end of the 1960s, Dee's career had slowed significantly, and she was dropped by Universal Pictures. She rarely acted following her 1967 divorce from Darin. In a 1967 interview with Roger Ebert, she reflected on her experience in the studio system and on the ingénue image that had been foisted on her, which she found constricting:

Look at this—[a] cigarette. I like to smoke. I'm 25 years old, and it so happens that I like to smoke. So out in Hollywood the studio press agents are still pulling cigarettes out of my hand and covering my drink with a napkin whenever my picture is taken. Little Sandra Dee isn't supposed to smoke, you know. Or drink. Or breathe.

Dee appeared in the somewhat successful Doctor, You've Got to Be Kidding! in 1967 for MGM. Hunter asked her to return to Universal in a co-starring role in Rosie! (1967); the film was not a success. Dee was inactive in the film industry for several years before appearing in the 1970 American International Pictures occult horror film The Dunwich Horror—a loose adaptation of an H.P. Lovecraft story—as a college student who finds herself in the center of an occult ritual plot. Dee later said, "The reason I decided to do Dunwich was because I couldn't put the script down once I started reading it. I had read so many that I had to plow through, just because I promised someone. Even if this movie turns out be a complete disaster, I guarantee it will change my image." Although it was written in the screenplay, she refused to appear nude in the film's final sequence.

In the 1970s, Dee took sporadic guest-starring roles on episodes of several television series, including Night Gallery, Fantasy Island and Police Woman. Her final film performance was in the low-budget drama Lost (1983). In her later years, Dee told a newspaper that she "felt like a has-been that never was".

=== 1984–2005: Later life and retirement ===
Dee's years in the 1980s were marked by poor health, and she became a self-described recluse after retiring from acting. At one point, she finally confronted her mother about the sexual abuse by her stepfather when she was a child, as well as her mother's obliviousness to it. She said:

One night I couldn't control the pressure any longer. My mother and I were at home with a few of her close friends, and she started eulogizing my stepfather. I was slowly getting more and more irate. Finally I said, "Mom, shut up. A saint he wasn't." My mother started defending him, and I said, "Well, guess what your saint did to me? He had sex with me." My mother was shocked, then angry. I knew I hurt her. I wanted to. I had so much anger toward her for not doing something to help me. But she ignored me, and the subject never came up again. I realize now that my mother erased the abuse from her own mind. It didn't exist, so she didn't have to feel guilty.

Dee battled anorexia nervosa, depression, and alcoholism for many years, hitting a low point after her mother died of lung cancer on December 27, 1987, at age 63. Dee stated that for months she became a recluse living on soup, crackers and Scotch, with her body weight falling to only 80 pounds (36 kg). After she began to vomit blood, her son compelled her to seek medical and psychiatric treatment. Her mental and physical condition improved, and she expressed a desire to appear in a television situation comedy, partly in order to belong to a family. She stopped drinking altogether after being diagnosed with kidney failure in 2000, which was attributed to years of heavy drinking and smoking.

In 1994's Dream Lovers: The Magnificent Shattered Lives of Bobby Darin and Sandra Dee, Dodd Darin chronicled his mother's anorexia and drug and alcohol problems, stating that she had been sexually abused as a child by her stepfather Eugene Douvan. The same year, Dee's final acting credit occurred with a voice-only appearance on an episode of Frasier.

== Death ==
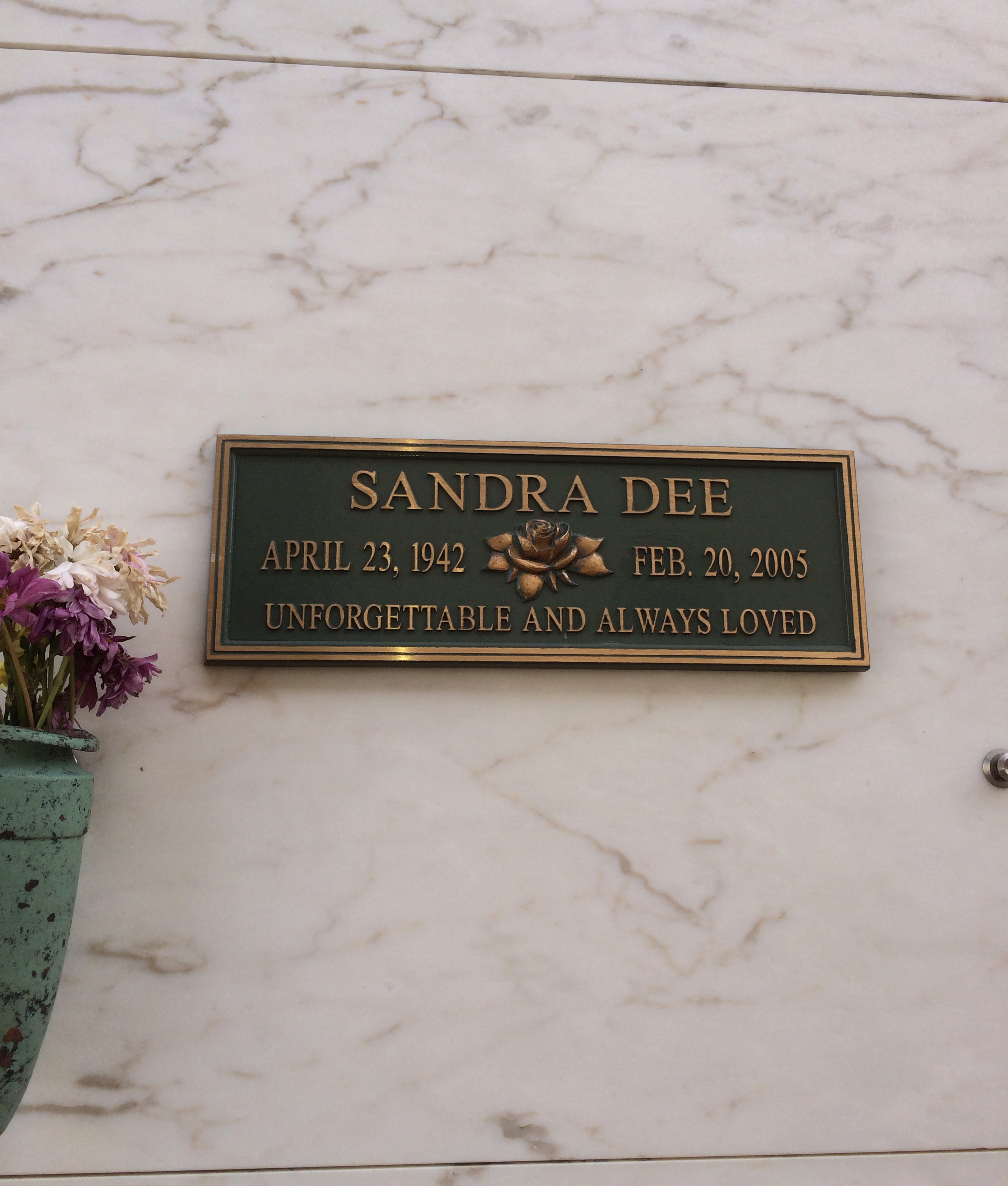
Crypt of Sandra Dee at Forest Lawn, Hollywood Hills, Los Angeles

After requiring kidney dialysis for the last four years of her life, Dee died of complications from kidney disease on February 20, 2005, at the Los Robles Hospital & Medical Center in Thousand Oaks, California, at the age of 62. She is interred in a crypt at Forest Lawn Memorial Park Cemetery in the Hollywood Hills.

== Filmography ==
=== Film ===
Year	Title	Role	Notes	Ref.
1957	Until They Sail	Evelyn Leslie		
1957	The Snow Queen	Gerda	Voice: 1959 English version	
1958	The Reluctant Debutante	Jane Broadbent		
1958	The Restless Years	Melinda Grant	Alternative title: The Wonderful Years	
1959	A Stranger in My Arms	Pat Beasley	Alternative title: And Ride a Tiger	
1959	Gidget	Gidget (Frances Lawrence)		
1959	Imitation of Life	Susie, age 16		
1959	The Wild and the Innocent	Rosalie Stocker		
1959	A Summer Place	Molly Jorgenson		
1960	Portrait in Black	Cathy Cabot		
1961	Romanoff and Juliet	Juliet Moulsworth	Alternative title: Dig That Juliet	
1961	Tammy Tell Me True	Tambrey "Tammy" Tyree		
1961	Come September	Sandy Stevens		
1962	If a Man Answers	Chantal Stacy		
1963	Tammy and the Doctor	Tambrey "Tammy" Tyree		
1963	Take Her, She's Mine	Mollie Michaelson		
1964	I'd Rather Be Rich	Cynthia Dulaine		
1965	That Funny Feeling	Joan Howell		
1966	A Man Could Get Killed	Amy Franklin	Alternative title: Welcome, Mr. Beddoes	
1967	Doctor, You've Got to Be Kidding!	Heather Halloran		
1967	Rosie!	Daphne Shaw		
1970	The Dunwich Horror	Nancy Wagner		
1972	The Manhunter	Mara Bocock	Television film	
1972	The Daughters of Joshua Cabe	Ada	Television film	
1974	Houston, We've Got a Problem	Angie Cordell	Television film	
1977	Fantasy Island	Francesca Hamilton	Television film	
1983	Lost	Penny Morrison	Final film role	

=== Television ===
Year	Title	Role	Notes	Ref.
1971–1972	Night Gallery	Ann Bolt / Millicent/Marion Hardy	2 episodes	
1972	Love, American Style	Bonnie Galloway	Segment: "Love and the Sensuous Twin"	
1972	The Sixth Sense	Alice Martin	Episode: "Through a Flame Darkly"	
1978	Police Woman	Marie Quinn	Episode: "Blind Terror"	
1983	Fantasy Island	Margaret Winslow	Episode: "Eternal Flame/A Date with Burt"	
1994	Frasier	Connie (voice only)	Episode: "The Botched Language of Cranes"	

== Accolades ==
Award	Category	Year	Nominated work	Result	Ref.
Golden Globe Award	Most Promising Newcomer - Female	1958	Until They Sail	Won	
Laurel Award	Top Female New Personality	1959	—	Won	
Laurel Award	Top Female Comedy Performance	1960	Gidget	5th place	
Laurel Award	Top Female Star	1960	—	14th place	
Laurel Award	Top Female Star	1961	—	5th place	
Laurel Award	Top Female Star	1962	—	11th place	
Laurel Award	Top Female Comedy Performance	1963	If a Man Answers	4th place	
Laurel Award	Top Female Star	1963	—	6th place	
Laurel Award	Top Female Comedy Performance	1964	Take Her, She's Mine	4th place	
Laurel Award	Top Female Star	1964	—	7th place	
Laurel Award	Top Female Star	1965	—	9th place	
Laurel Award	Top Female Star	1966	—	10th place	
Laurel Award	Top Female Star	1967	—	14th place	

== Box-office ranking ==
In the following years, exhibitors voted Dee one of the most popular box-office stars in the United States:

- 1959—16th
- 1960—7th
- 1961—6th
- 1962—9th
- 1963—8th

== In popular culture ==
Dee is referred to in the song "Look at Me, I'm Sandra Dee", from the 1971 musical Grease and its 1978 film adaptation.

In American Graffiti, Terry the Toad gets the attention of the blonde Debbie by telling her she looks like Connie Stevens. She says she thinks of herself as looking like Sandra Dee.

She is mentioned in a line from the Rodney Crowell song “Ain’t Livin’ Long Like This”, made famous by Waylon Jennings, “…makes Texas Ruby look like Sandra Dee…”

She is mentioned in the Mötley Crüe song "Come on and Dance" as well as the Lita Ford song "Can't Catch Me".

== Sources ==
- Craig, Rob (2019). American International Pictures: A Comprehensive Filmography. Jefferson, North Carolina: McFarland. ISBN 978-1-476-66631-0.
- Darin, Dodd (1994). Dream Lovers: The Magnificent Shattered Lives of Bobby Darin and Sandra Dee. New York: Warner Books. ISBN 978-0-44651-768-3. OCLC 30071949.
- Kashner, Sam; MacNair, Jennifer (2002). The Bad & the Beautiful: Hollywood in the Fifties. W. W. Norton & Company. ISBN 978-0-39332-436-5.
- Lisanti, Thomas (2017). Hollywood Surf and Beach Movies: The First Wave, 1959–1969. Jefferson, North Carolina: McFarland. ISBN 978-1-476-60142-7.
- Monush, Barry, ed. (2003). Screen World Presents the Encyclopedia of Hollywood Film Actors: From the Silent Era to 1965. Vol. 1. New York: Hal Leonard Corporation. ISBN 978-1-557-83551-2.
- Staggs, Sam (2010). "Pretty Baby". Born to Be Hurt: The Untold Story of Imitation of Life. St. Martin's Griffin. ISBN 978-0-31260-555-1.
- Wayne, Jane Ellen (2003). The Golden Girls of MGM: Greta Garbo, Joan Crawford, Lana Turner, Judy Garland, Ava Gardner, Grace Kelly and Others. New York: Carroll & Graf. ISBN 0-7867-1303-8.
