= The Female Animal =

1958 film by Harry Keller

- Film poster
- Directed by: Harry Keller
- Screenplay by: Robert Hill
- Story by: Albert Zugsmith
- Produced by: Albert Zugsmith
- Starring: Hedy Lamarr; Jane Powell; Jan Sterling; George Nader; Jerry Paris; James Gleason; Gregg Palmer
- Cinematography: Russell Metty
- Edited by: Milton Carruth
- Music by: Hans J. Salter
- Color process: Black and white
- Production company: Universal Pictures
- Distributed by: Universal Pictures
- Release dates: January 22, 1958 (New York City); April 23, 1958 (Los Angeles)
- Running time: 82 minutes
- Country: United States
- Language: English

The Female Animal is a 1958 American CinemaScope drama film directed by Harry Keller and starring Hedy Lamarr, Jane Powell, Jan Sterling and George Nader.

Although she lived until 2000, this was Lamarr's final film in a career of nearly 30 years.

== Plot ==
Movie star Vanessa Windsor is nearly struck by a camera on the set, saved at the last second by Chris Farley, a handsome extra. A cut on his arm is attended to and Vanessa invites him to dinner at her Malibu beach home, where she clearly has designs on him for a night of romance.

Their evening is interrupted by a message that Vanessa's grown daughter, Penny, is sick. Vanessa rushes to her only to find her drunk. Penny then accuses her mother of adopting her simply for the publicity.

Vanessa decides to offer Chris a job as caretaker for the beach house. He is considering an offer from a friend, Hank Lopez, to shoot a film in Mexico, but the job pays nothing, so Chris accepts Vanessa's offer instead. In time, they become lovers as well.

Not knowing who she is, Chris comes upon Penny being physically manhandled by a date. Chris punches the man and takes a tipsy Penny back to the beach house. She doesn't indicate any recognition of the home as her mother's. Penny is so drunk that Chris places her under a shower, whereupon she kisses him.

Vanessa begins having Chris as her escort in public, but endures disapproving looks as well as snide remarks from Lily Frayne, another aging actress out with a younger man. Chris starts to resent being a kept man. Although Penny reveals her true identity to him, they end up having an affair. Chris decides to bail out of the threesome by agreeing to shoot the movie in Mexico, but Vanessa merely sees this as an opportunity for a publicity stunt marriage in Mexico. Chris again tries to end the relationship but still keeps Vanessa in the dark about the identity of her love rival.

On set, Penny tells Vanessa that she is having an affair with Chris. Vanessa subsequently drinks to the point of inebriation. When she's shooting a dangerous scene, Vanessa sees Chris and Penny standing together on the set and is overwhelmed. She takes a dangerous plunge into a water pool, a dive that was supposed to have been performed by her stunt woman. Chris rescues her again; in the final scene, she tells him "it wouldn't have worked anyway" and then sobs into her pillow.

== Cast ==
- Hedy Lamarr as Vanessa Windsor
- Jane Powell as Penny Windsor
- Jan Sterling as Lily Frayne
- George Nader as Chris Farley
- Jerry Paris as Hank Galvez (not Lopez)
- Gregg Palmer as Piggy
- Mabel Albertson as Irma Jones
- James Gleason as Tom Maloney
- Richard H. Cutting as Mr. John Ramsay
- Ann Doran as Nurse
- Yvonne Peattie as Hairdresser
- Max Showalter as Charlie Grant (as Casey Adams)
- Douglas Evans as Al The Director
- Aram Katcher as Mischa Boroff

== Production notes ==
The Female Animal was the "A" picture that was distributed as a double-bill with the "B" picture being Orson Welles's Touch of Evil. The tagline for the movie was "It is said that when a woman fights for a man, she is like an ANIMAL!".

The "aging actress" (Hedy Lamarr) was 44, her youthful lover (George Nader) 36 and her precocious daughter (Jane Powell) 29 when the movie was shot.

== Reception ==
Howard Thompson of The New York Times gave the film a mixed review, criticizing the "tired, soap-opera resolution", but heavily praised the dialogue and atmosphere, praising the former as depicting "the jaded ugliness and brisk carnality of the chatter..." as well as being "so authentic it hurts."
