= In Enemy Country =

1968 film by Harry Keller

- Directed by: Harry Keller
- Written by: Edward Anhalt; Sy Bartlett
- Produced by: Harry Keller
- Starring: Anthony Franciosa; Anjanette Comer; Guy Stockwell; Paul Hubschmid; Tom Bell
- Cinematography: Loyal Griggs
- Edited by: Russell F. Schoengarth
- Music by: William Lava
- Production company: Universal Pictures
- Distributed by: Universal Pictures
- Release date: July 1968
- Running time: 107 minutes
- Country: United States
- Language: English

In Enemy Country is a 1968 American war film produced and directed by Harry Keller starring Anthony Franciosa, Anjanette Comer and Guy Stockwell. The film's art direction was by John Beckman and Alexander Golitzen.

== Plot ==
During World War II a group of Allied agents are sent on a secret mission to German-occupied France to destroy a dangerous new weapon.

== Cast ==
- Anthony Franciosa as Charles
- Anjanette Comer as Denise
- Guy Stockwell as Braden
- Paul Hubschmid as Frederich
- Tom Bell as Ian
- Michael Constantine as Ladislov
- Harry Townes as Gen. Marchois
- John Marley as Rausch
- Milton Selzer as Bartowski
- Patric Knowles as Gen. Lloyd-Griffis
- Tige Andrews as Nicolay
- Émile Genest as Gen. Grieux
- Lee Bergere as Miral
- Virginia Christine as Frau Gulden
- Harry Landers as Pilot
- Jean-Michel Michenaud as Polish Boy
- Gene Dynarski as Capek
- Ivor Barry as Air Marshal Evelyn
- Simon Scott as Gen. Jomar
- Paul Busch as Convoy Commander
- Jim Creech as Co-Pilot
- Mischa Hausserman
- Murray Matheson
- Norbert Meisel
- Gerd Rein as German Guard on Train
- Norbert Schiller as Polish Man

== Bibliography ==
- Jay Jorgensen. Edith Head: The Fifty-year Career of Hollywood's Greatest Costume Designer. Running Press, 2010.

== See also ==
- List of American films of 1968
