= Rosie! =

1967 film by David Lowell Rich

- Theatrical release poster
- Directed by: David Lowell Rich
- Written by: Samuel A. Taylor
- Based on: play A Very Rich Woman by Ruth Gordon and play Les Joies de la famille by Philippe Heriat
- Produced by: Ross Hunter; Jacques Mapes
- Starring: Rosalind Russell; Sandra Dee; Brian Aherne
- Cinematography: Clifford Stine
- Edited by: Stuart Gilmore
- Music by: Lyn Murray
- Distributed by: Universal Pictures
- Release date: November 22, 1967
- Running time: 98 minutes
- Country: United States
- Language: English

Rosie! is a 1967 American comedy film directed by David Lowell Rich, based on Ruth Gordon's play A Very Rich Woman.

== Plot ==
Rosie Lord is a widowed millionaire who, much to the dismay of her daughters Mildred and Edith, spends her money generously. When she announces she intends to buy a $2.5 million closed theater in a run-down part of Los Angeles, because it is the location where her late husband proposed to her and it is now threatened to be turned into a parking lot, her daughters decide that they have had enough. Edith and her husband Cabot complain that they are only granted $100,000 a year, and work together with cold-hearted and recently divorced Mildred to discourage Rosie from buying the theater. They are unable to convince her and her legal advisor Oliver to let them take care of her money, and thus decide to try to declare her incompetent, thereby hoping to put her in an insane asylum. Edith and Cabot's young daughter Daphne is appalled to overhear the scheme, and vows to help her grandmother.

Daphne rushes to Oliver's office, but runs into his much younger associate David Wheelwright, who promises to help her after an emotional conversation. Oliver is upset to find out that one of his workers is taking matters in own hands, and meets with David to hear him out. David advises that they should put someone with Rosie to prevent her from doing anything outrageous, because their daughters are sending a private investigator to the case. Oliver takes his advice, but sends him on the job. David reluctantly starts the job, but is quickly drawn to Rosie's extraverted personality. Simultaneously, he goes on a few romantic dates with Daphne and they fall in love.

After attending a piano recital, Rosie is abducted by two men, and later awakens in a locked rest home for the mentally unstable in the Santa Monica mountains. Rosie is heartbroken to learn that her daughters committed her to a sanitarium, and rejects an offer from Cabot to sign the papers for her release in exchange for making them responsible of her finances. He assures her that they can keep her in the sanitarium indefinitely if she does not obey their wishes, prompting Rosie to reconsider. Meanwhile, Daphne finds out what has happened, and furiously leaves the home, despite her mother's plea not to leave her.

With the help of Oliver and David, Daphne enters the rest home and breaks Rosie out. Rosie, who cannot believe what her own daughters did to her, is next sued in court. Mildred and Edith's lawyer puts Rosie's sanity at debate, and Rosie is ready to announce her defeat during the process. Daphne and Oliver console her during the trial, and when Oliver announces his love for her, Rosie decides to fight again. She faints in court and pretends to be dying, to get her daughters to admit that she is sane (in order for Rosie to change her will just before dying). The case is thereby dismissed and Rosie is now free to marry Oliver.

== Cast ==
- Rosalind Russell as Rosie Lord
- Sandra Dee as Daphne Shaw
- Brian Aherne as Oliver Stevenson
- James Farentino as David Wheelwright
- Audrey Meadows as Mildred Deever
- Vanessa Brown as Edith Shaw
- Leslie Nielsen as Cabot Shaw
- Margaret Hamilton as Mae
- Reginald Owen as Patrick
- Juanita Moore as Nurse
- Virginia Grey as Mrs. Peters
- Dean Harens as Willetts
- Doris Lloyd as Sedalia

== Reception ==
Writing in The New York Times, critic Howard Thompson called the film "a tasteless brew of comedy, pathos and grim drama...This one is downright embarrassing." He ended his review by writing "This is one 'Rosie!' where the petals fall off and the thorns take over." Roger Ebert gave the film 3 out of 4 stars, writing that it joined "“Divorce American Style” among recent Hollywood movies that have used conventional means to make an unexpected social commentary", praising Rosalind Russell's performance, concluding: "This is not comedy but satire, and an interesting development from Hollywood. It is also, by the way, excellent entertainment for the holidays: a family film of interest to adults, too, not just to 6-year-olds."

== See also ==
- List of American films of 1967
