= Romanoff and Juliet (1961 film) =

1961 film

- Film poster
- Directed by: Peter Ustinov
- Written by: Peter Ustinov
- Produced by: Walter Thompson
- Starring: Peter Ustinov; Sandra Dee; John Gavin
- Cinematography: Robert Krasker
- Edited by: Renzo Lucidi
- Music by: Mario Nascimbene
- Production company: Pavla Productions
- Distributed by: Universal Pictures
- Release date: 8 June 1961
- Running time: 103 minutes
- Country: United States
- Language: English

Romanoff and Juliet is a 1961 American Technicolor romantic comedy film adaptation of the play Romanoff and Juliet, which was itself loosely based on Romeo and Juliet by William Shakespeare, released by Universal Pictures. Peter Ustinov wrote the screenplay, directed, and starred in the film. It co-starred John Gavin as Igor and Sandra Dee as Juliet. The film was shot in Italy.

== Plot ==
A vote in the United Nations is deadlocked. The deciding vote goes to the tiny, obscure European Republic of Concordia. Its president, known as the General (Peter Ustinov), abstains from voting. To remedy the issue, ambassadors from the United States and Soviet Union attempt to win the General's favor.

Juliet Moulsworth (Sandra Dee) and Igor Romanoff (John Gavin) meet at a party, not knowing that Juliet is the daughter of the American ambassador and Igor is the son of the Soviet ambassador. They instantly fall in love and spend the whole night talking. Before they part the next morning, they are distressed to discover each other's parentage.

Juliet's fiancé, Freddie, writes to say he is coming to visit her in Concordia. Panicked, she confesses to her parents that she is not in love with Freddie, but rather with Igor. Her parents are shocked and horrified. Meanwhile, Igor is informed by his parents that they have arranged a marriage for him and the prospective bride will soon arrive. Igor informs them that he has fallen in love with Juliet and they react in a similar manner as Juliet's parents.

Otto, an adviser to the General, fears that their small nation will be invaded should they continue to abstain from voting. Lacking any formal military, the two of them make an unconventional plan to save Concordia. They begin by intimidating the larger nations with a fake atomic bomb detonation. They follow this up by putting together a volunteer army out of patriotic civilians, complete with fake air raids and chaotic, nonsensical military exercises.

A Soviet spy informs the General that Igor will kill himself if he cannot be with Juliet. The General hurries to Igor and stops the young man by promising he will see his beloved within the hour. The General goes to Juliet, who tells him she cannot be with Igor for the sake of her parents. The General counters that she must listen to her own heart's desires.

The General presides over a celebration of Concordia's history with the American and Soviet ambassadors and their wives in attendance. A seemingly fake marriage ceremony turns out to be a real one between Juliet and Igor, who have disguised themselves. They are wedded on the steps of a church by a Concordian priest.

The General asks the ambassadors if they are ready to surrender to the inevitability of love, which they refuse. The General pretends to order a firing squad on the parents, only to reveal that Concordia has never made nor purchased ammunition. Dancing in the streets ensues. Igor asks the General how they can thank him. The General replies he should be thanking them, as they have proven love cannot be defeated. He will go to the United Nations to report on Concordia's victory.

== Cast ==
- Peter Ustinov as The General
- Sandra Dee as Juliet Moulsworth
- John Gavin as Igor Romanoff
- Akim Tamiroff as Vadim Romanoff
- Tamara Shayne as Evdokia Romanoff
- Alix Talton as Beulah
- Rik Van Nutter as Freddie
- John Phillips as Hooper Moulsworth
- Peter Jones as Otto
- Suzanne Cloutier as Marfa Zlotochienka

== Awards ==
Ustinov was nominated for the Golden Bear at the 11th Berlin International Film Festival and the Directors Guild of America Award for Outstanding Directorial Achievement in Motion Pictures.
