= The Wild and the Innocent =

1959 film by Jack Sher

- Film poster by Reynold Brown
- Directed by: Jack Sher
- Written by: Sy Gomberg; Jack Sher
- Based on: story by Sy Gomberg
- Produced by: Sy Gomberg
- Starring: Audie Murphy; Joanne Dru; Gilbert Roland; Jim Backus; Sandra Dee
- Cinematography: Harold Lipstein
- Edited by: George Gittens
- Music by: Hans J. Salter
- Color process: Eastmancolor
- Production company: Universal-International
- Distributed by: Universal Pictures
- Release date: May 27, 1959
- Running time: 85 minutes
- Country: United States
- Language: English

The Wild and the Innocent is a 1959 American CinemaScope Western film directed by Jack Sher and starring Audie Murphy and Sandra Dee, two inexperienced young people who get into trouble when they visit a town for the very first time. The film was the final Universal-International film shot in CinemaScope.

== Plot ==
Shy and naive mountain trapper Yancy travels through Wyoming with his uncle and his uncle's Indian wife. After Uncle Lije is injured by a bear, Yancy is sent to trade their beaver pelts for money and supplies. When he arrives at the trading post, he finds it has been burnt down by an Indian who was sold moonshine by a lazy sneak thief, Ben Stocker. The trading post owner tells Yancy that he will have to ride two more days to the nearest town, Casper, Wyoming, to trade his furs. Stocker tries to trade his oldest daughter Rosalie to Yancy for some furs, but is rebuffed. The next day, Yancy finds that Rosalie has run away from her father and wants him to take her to town.

When they reach the town it is July 4 and festivities are in full swing. After he trades his furs, Yancy gets Rosalie some new clothes so she will be presentable to look for a job. Paul Bartell, the town's corrupt sheriff, says he will find Rosalie a job at the dance hall, and Yancy believes that this will be alright. Yancy falls for a local woman, Marcy Howard, who works at the dance hall. When he finds out what really goes on at the dance hall, Yancy goes to get Rosalie. Bartell, who intends to earn good money with Rosalie, refuses to let the girl go, and Yancy is forced to shoot him in self-defense.

The next day, Yancy is loading up to leave for the mountains, while he intends for Rosalie to stay at the general store and be cared for by Mr. and Mrs. Forbes, the store keepers. However, Rosalie refuses to part from him. In the end Uncle Lije and Yancy head back into the mountains with Rosalie riding on the back of Yancy's horse.

== Cast ==
- Audie Murphy as Yancy Hawks
- Joanne Dru as Marcy Howard
- Gilbert Roland as Sheriff Paul Bartell
- Jim Backus as Cecil Forbes
- Sandra Dee as Rosalie Stocker
- George Mitchell as Uncle Lije Hawks
- Peter Breck as Chip
- Strother Martin as Ben Stocker
- Wesley Marie Tackitt as Ma Ransome
- Betty Harford as Mrs. Forbes
- Mel Leonard as Pitchman
- Lillian Adams as Kiri Hawks
- Val Benedict as Richie
- Jim Sheppard as Henchman
- Edson Stroll as Henchman (as Ed Stroll)
- John Qualls as Henchman
- Frank Wolff as Henchman
- Rosemary Eliot as Dancehall Girl
- Barboura Morris as Dancehall Girl
- Louise Glenn as Dancehall Girl
- Stephen Roberts as Bouncer
- Tammy Windsor as Townswoman

== Production ==
Filming took place in Big Bear Lake, California starting October 1958. The film was known as The Buckskin Lad and the Calico Girl.

== See also ==
- List of American films of 1959
