= Gunpoint (film) =

1966 film by Earl Bellamy

- Directed by: Earl Bellamy
- Written by: Mary Willingham; Willard W. Willingham
- Produced by: Gordon Kay
- Starring: Audie Murphy
- Cinematography: William Marguiles
- Edited by: Russell F. Schoengarth
- Music by: Hans J. Salter
- Color process: Technicolor
- Production company: Universal Pictures
- Distributed by: Universal Pictures
- Release dates: April 6, 1966 (Los Angeles); April 27, 1966 (United States)
- Running time: 86 minutes
- Country: United States
- Language: English
- Budget: $500,000

Gunpoint is a 1966 American Western film directed by Earl Bellamy and starring Audie Murphy. It was Murphy's final film for Universal Pictures.

== Plot ==
In a small town in 1880s Colorado, a gang of outlaws led by Drago rob a train and kidnap a saloon singer, Uvalde. Determined to chase them down, the sheriff, Chad Lucas, forms a posse which includes Uvalde's fiancé, Nate Harlan, Mark Emerson, Nicos, and Lucas's deputy Cap – who is secretly in league with the outlaws. During the chase Nate realises that Chad and Uvalde used to be lovers. The posse battles Indians, horse thieves and conflicts among themselves before discovering Uvalde; eventually the sheriff's pursuit is successful.

== Cast ==
- Audie Murphy as Chad Lucas
- Joan Staley as Uvalde (Bonnie Mitchell)
- Warren Stevens as Nate Harlan
- Edgar Buchanan as Bull
- Denver Pyle as Cap Hold
- David Macklin as Mark Emerson
- Nick Dennis as Nicos
- Royal Dano as Ode
- Kelly Thordsen as Ab
- Morgan Woodward as Drago
- William Bramley as Hoag
- Robert Pine as Mitchell
- John Hoyt as Mayor Osborne
- Ford Rainey as Tom Emerson
- Mike Ragan as Zack
- Roy Barcroft as Dr. Beardsley

== Production ==
The film was the last of seven Westerns Audie Murphy made with producer Gordon Kay, starting with Hell Bent for Leather (1960). Parts of the film were shot at Kanab Canyon in Utah. Scenes from earlier Universal films starring Murphy, including Kansas Raiders, The Cimarron Kid, Ride Clear of Diablo, Night Passage, Gunsmoke and Sierra, were re-used in this film.

When Hedda Hopper asked him what the story was about, he told her, "Same story only we're getting older horses". Leading lady Joan Staley suffered a horse riding accident during production which limited her subsequent career. After making the movie, Murphy went to work in Europe for a number of years.

== See also ==
- List of American films of 1966
