= The Restless Years (film) =

1958 film by Helmut Käutner

- Directed by: Helmut Käutner
- Screenplay by: Edward Anhalt
- Based on: Teach Me to Cry (play) by Patricia Joudry
- Produced by: Ross Hunter
- Starring: John Saxon; Sandra Dee
- Cinematography: Ernest Laszlo
- Edited by: Albrecht Joseph
- Music by: Frank Skinner
- Color process: Black and white
- Production company: Universal Pictures
- Distributed by: Universal Pictures
- Release date: 1958
- Running time: 86 minutes
- Country: United States
- Language: English

The Restless Years is a 1958 American CinemaScope melodrama directed by Helmut Käutner and starring John Saxon and Sandra Dee. It was Sandra Dee's first leading role and the first of three movies she made with John Saxon.

== Plot ==
Melinda Grant is a 16-year-old girl with dreams of leaving her hometown of Libertyville someday and seeing the world. She is raised by a single mother, Elizabeth, a seamstress, and scandalized by the reputation of being illegitimate, although the meek Elizabeth insists that Melinda's father died when she was an infant.

At a school dance, Melinda is taunted by a pair of popular students, Polly and Bruce, but befriended by a boy named Will who tells her that, as the son of a traveling salesman, he's lived in many different towns. She likes the sound of that, whereas Will's ambition is to settle down in one place.

Bruce and a few of his friends try to drive them off the road after Will offers Melinda a ride home. The tension between them grows when Melinda accepts an offer from teacher Miss Robson to audition for Our Town, the school play, then beats out Polly for a leading role.

Will is troubled because his dad, Ed, is constantly angling for Will to befriend the "right kids" and make connections to help his sales business. Will's romantic interest in Melinda seems disturbing to her mother Elizabeth, although she sews Melinda a costume for the play. Polly tries to blackmail Melinda into giving up the role on Parents Night, then blurts to the gathering that Melinda and Will are lovers. Bruce then attacks Will. In defending himself, Will knocks Bruce out. When the other parents only see the conclusion of the fight (and not the fact that Bruce started it), they want Will arrested. Will urges his father Ed to stand up to them, and defend him. Ed does just that, and in a very assertive manner ... he tells them all that he is taking his whole family and leaving town, and warns all of them that they had better not even think about pursuing legal charges against his son. Elizabeth finally acknowledges to Melinda that her baby's father left town without marrying her. She now fears that Melinda will be similarly seduced and abandoned, but Will assures both Melinda and Elizabeth that he will be back after his family leaves town.

== Cast ==
- John Saxon as Will Henderson
- Sandra Dee as Melinda Grant
- Teresa Wright as Elizabeth Grant
- James Whitmore as Ed Henderson
- Luana Patten as Polly Fisher
- Margaret Lindsay as Dorothy Henderson
- Virginia Grey as Miss Robson
- Jody McCrea as Bruce Mitchell
- Alan Baxter as Alex Fisher
- Hayden Rorke as Mr. Booth
- Dorothy Green as Laura Fisher

== Production ==
Helmut Käutner had wanted to make a film adaptation of Patricia Joudry's play Teach Me to Cry for some time. It was not until 1957 that the film began production. The film was completed in 1958.

== Reception ==
Variety called it "touching".

== See also ==
- List of American films of 1958
