= Voice in the Mirror =

1958 film by Harry Keller

- Directed by: Harry Keller
- Screenplay by: Lawrence B. Marcus (as Larry Marcus)
- Produced by: Gordon Kay
- Starring: Richard Egan; Julie London
- Cinematography: William H. Daniels
- Edited by: George A. Gittens
- Music by: Henry Mancini
- Production company: Universal Pictures
- Distributed by: Universal Pictures
- Release date: August 13, 1958 (New York City)
- Running time: 103 minutes
- Country: United States
- Language: English

Voice in the Mirror, also known as How Lonely the Night and This Day Alone, is a 1958 American CinemaScope drama film noir directed by Harry Keller and starring Richard Egan and Julie London.

== Plot ==
After sinking into the depths of drunken despair due to the death of his daughter, a man is warned by his doctor that he is on the brink of terminal mental illness. Struck by a fellow alcoholic's suggestion that he should try faith, he begins saving not only himself but others, eventually creating Alcoholics Anonymous.

== Cast ==
- Richard Egan as Jim Burton
- Julie London as Ellen Burton
- Walter Matthau as Dr. Karnes
- Troy Donahue as Paul Cunningham
- Harry Bartell as Harry Graham
- Peggy Converse as Mrs. Harriet Cunningham – Paul's Mother
- Ann Doran as Mrs. Deviln
- Mae Clarke as Mrs. Robbins
- Max Showalter as Don Martin (as Casey Adams)
- Hugh Sanders as A.W. Hornsby
- Ken Lynch as Frank – Bartender
- Dorris Singleton as Liz Perkins
- Dave Barry as Quintet Planist
- Alan Dexter as Bartender
- Arthur O'Connell as Bill Tobin
