= Seven Ways from Sundown =

1960 film by Harry Keller

- Film poster
- Directed by: Harry Keller
- Written by: Clair Huffaker (novel)
- Story by: Clair Huffaker
- Produced by: Gordon Kay
- Starring: Audie Murphy; Barry Sullivan
- Cinematography: Ellis W. Carter
- Edited by: Tony Martinelli
- Music by: Irving Gertz; William Lava
- Color process: Eastmancolor
- Production company: Universal International Pictures
- Distributed by: Universal Pictures
- Release date: September 25, 1960
- Running time: 87 minutes
- Country: United States
- Language: English
- Budget: $500,000

Seven Ways from Sundown is a 1960 American Western film directed by Harry Keller and starring Audie Murphy and Barry Sullivan. It is based on the novel of the same name by Clair Huffaker, who also wrote the script.

== Plot ==
Seven Jones (Murphy) is a young Texas Ranger on his first assignment, following in the footsteps of his brother, Two Jones, who was also a Ranger.

He initially comes to a town where the inhabitants try to attack him, angry at the lack of support from Texas Rangers. He learns that the town had just been attacked by outlaw Jim Flood (Sullivan), who had killed two men in a shoot-out over a card game, and set fire to the saloon, which burned down.

Jones reports for duty at the Texas Rangers headquarters, and it is revealed Jones's brother, Two, was also a Ranger there. In the town he meets a woman, Joy (Venetia Stevenson) who is the daughter of the lady who looks after the Rangers' meals, and he starts to fall for her. He is soon sent to capture Flood, who it is revealed is a legendary gunslinger and is something of a Western folk hero. He is dispatched on the mission with a more experienced Ranger, Sergeant Hennessey (John McIntire), by the Lieutenant, Herly (Kenneth Tobey). Hennessey protests that it is unusual that a new recruit be sent on such a mission after such a dangerous man, but Herly insists.

They track Flood for some days, however, as they get close to Flood, he ambushes them and shoots Hennessey from a distance. Hennessey orders Jones to turn back, but he refuses, and Hennessey dies. Jones buries him, and he continues on.

Despite his inexperience, Jones manages to capture Flood, but he soon finds that transporting him to prison will not be easy. Flood, though easygoing in his manner, warns Jones that he will never be locked up again, but Jones is determined to take him back to Texas, and to justice. Flood has opportunities to kill Jones, but instead continues on the journey, all the while insisting that he will never be put back in jail. Along the way, several people for various reasons want to kill either the young Ranger or Flood. Flood is extremely popular in some towns, who want to free him, while others want to kill him for his past deeds, or for the bounty. It is revealed that Flood has an extensive criminal history, having escaped jail several times and the noose twice.

As Jones and his prisoner make their dangerous journey, they occasionally have to work together to survive. They form a grudging respect for each other, almost a friendship, but they know that in the end they are on opposite sides of the law.

== Cast ==
- Audie Murphy as Seven Jones
- Barry Sullivan as Jim Flood
- Venetia Stevenson as Joy Karrington
- John McIntire as Sergeant Hennessey
- Kenneth Tobey as Lieutenant Herly
- Mary Field as Ma Karrington
- Ken Lynch as Graves
- Suzanne Lloyd as Lucinda
- Ward Ramsey as Fogarty
- Don Collier as Duncan
- Jack Kruschen as Beeker
- Claudia Barrett as Gilda
- Teddy Rooney as Jody
- Don Haggerty as Dorton
- Robert Burton as Eavens
- Fred Graham as Chief Waggoner
- Dale Van Sickel as 2nd Waggoner (credited as Dale Van Sickle)

== Production ==
The film was originally directed by George Sherman. During filming in the studio, shortly after the unit had returned from location work outside Las Vegas, Sherman and Audie Murphy had an argument over a line reading, which resulted in Murphy pushing Sherman over and threatening to kill him. Sherman left the project and was replaced for the remainder of the shoot by Harry Keller. Murphy started an affair with co-star Venetia Stevenson, which lasted for a year.

Parts of the film were shot in St. George, Utah. Other portions were filmed in Red Rock Canyon, Nevada.

== See also ==
- List of American films of 1960
