= Posse from Hell =

1961 film by Herbert Coleman

- British quad poster
- Directed by: Herbert Coleman
- Screenplay by: Clair Huffaker
- Based on: Clair Huffaker from his novel
- Produced by: Gordon Kay
- Starring: Audie Murphy; John Saxon
- Cinematography: Clifford Stine
- Edited by: Frederic Knudtson
- Color process: Eastmancolor
- Production company: Universal International Pictures
- Distributed by: Universal Pictures
- Release date: March 1, 1961
- Running time: 89 minutes
- Country: United States
- Language: English
- Budget: $500,000

Posse from Hell is a 1961 American Western film directed by Herbert Coleman and starring Audie Murphy and John Saxon.

== Plot ==
In 1880, four escapees from death row – Crip, Leo, Chunk, and Hash – ride into the town of Paradise and enter the Rosebud Saloon. Crip shoots the town marshal Isaac Webb and holds ten men hostage in the saloon, killing some to ensure the four are unmolested. The gang leaves town with $11,200 from the Bank of Paradise and hostage Helen Caldwell.

Banner Cole rides into town, having received a request from Webb to join him as his deputy. Webb's last act before dying is to deputize Cole, telling him to do the right thing. Cole agrees, and heads out to hunt the outlaws alone, but town elder Benson convinces Cole to follow Webb's wishes and organize a posse.

Cole's posse eventually consists of Captain Jeremiah Brown, a has-been ex-cavalry officer with delusions of grandeur; Jock Wiley, an overeager young trick-shooter; Uncle Billy Caldwell, a drunk who insists on helping rescue his niece Helen; Burt Hogan, who seems emotionally torn between lingering jealousy of his dead brother (one of those murdered by the four convicts) and avenging him; Johnny Caddo, an American Indian who is apparently only allowed to live in Paradise because of his skills as a blacksmith; and Seymour Kern, a tenderfoot banker, just arrived on a special assignment from the New York parent office of the bank, and who is browbeaten into joining the posse by the Paradise branch manager.

The posse soon find Helen, who has been left behind. Cole tells Uncle Billy to return with her to town, but Capt. Brown's clumsy attempt to console her (the script tiptoes delicately around the fact that the outlaws have raped her) only upsets her more and she tries to kill herself. Cole prevents that and Billy heads back, with Helen on a travois behind his horse.

Capt. Brown continues to find it impossible to believe he's not in charge and demonstrates his incompetence by disobeying Cole's orders and opening fire on four men initially thought to be the outlaws. But it's four cowhands, who lost two men to the outlaws. Cole has to wound Brown to stop his shooting and orders him back to town with the cowhands.

The posse heads for the ranch house where the cowhands encountered the outlaws and finds them still there. After a gun battle, three outlaws escape; the fourth kills Wiley but is then killed by Cole. Hogan begins shooting the corpse of the outlaw, claiming he wasn't dead and was the man who killed his brother. He then quits the posse.

Cole tells the other two (Caddo and Kern) to join Hogan, but they refuse. They continue tracking the party but realise that the outlaws have doubled back. The outlaws attempt an ambush, killing Cole's horse. Cole shoots Leo as the outlaws flee. They find he's not dead, but he soon does die, after telling Cole the others are heading back to Paradise.

A second ambush results in the death of Caddo and his horse. Cole and Kern track the remaining 2 outlaws to a ranch house near Paradise, the home of Helen and her Uncle Billy. Crip kills Uncle Billy. Kern wings Hash, who shoots back, killing Kern's horse, which falls on him, breaking his leg. Helen finishes Hash off with a six gun, then drives the buck board towards town. Cole goes after Crip and in the ensuing gunfight, Cole is shot in the side and Crip is killed.

The wounded Cole carries the injured Kern back into town. When the townsfolk try and help, he remarks with disdain. "Touch this man and I'll kill ya". Both men survive and are patched up. The townsfolk are divided on whether Cole should stay on as town marshal, but Cole remembers the echo of Marshall Webb's words that some people are good and to put down roots, and decides to stay on.

== Cast ==
- Audie Murphy as Banner Cole
- John Saxon as Seymour Kern
- Zohra Lampert as Helen Caldwell
- Vic Morrow as Crip
- Robert Keith as Capt. Jeremiah Brown
- Rodolfo Acosta as Johnny Caddo (as Rudolph Acosta)
- Royal Dano as "Uncle" Billy Caldwell
- Frank Overton as Burt Hogan
- James Bell as Mr. Benson
- Paul Carr as Jock Wiley
- Ward Ramsey as Marshal Isaac Webb
- Lee Van Cleef as Leo
- Ray Teal as the bank manager
- Forrest Lewis as Dr. Welles
- Charles Horvath as Hash
- Harry Lauter as Russell
- Henry Wills as Chunk
- Stuart Randall as Luke Gorman
- Allan Lane as Burl Hogan

== Production ==
Making his directoral debut, Herbert Coleman was a highly experienced assistant director and associate producer with a long string of credits including working with Alfred Hitchcock. Coleman later directed Audie Murphy in an episode of his Whispering Smith TV series and the feature Battle at Bloody Beach. Coleman filmed at Lone Pine, California with one location being the aptly named Rattlesnake Hill where thirty rattlesnakes were removed before filming could commence.

Coleman surrounded Murphy with a variety of up and coming young stars as well as experienced professionals. Zohra Lampert was a New York method actress whose adlibbing frequently confused Murphy, but the two worked out their scenes together. It was one of several Westerns John Saxon appeared in during the 1960s.

Huffaker's screenplay deviated from his novel by having Murphy's character as an outsider gunfighter rather than the Marshal's established deputy. His script emphasises the similarity between Cole's voluntary exclusion from society with Helen's sudden involuntary exclusion resulting from her rape. Helen attempts suicide then later talks about becoming a prostitute. She is talked out of both by Cole with the two eventually finding a place in society together. Huffaker stated that when writing a screenplay for the Medal of Honor awardee Audie Murphy, he had to put Murphy's character in "a situation where he has to do something bigger than life. So it really kind of fit him in a way".

Through his viewing the actions of Caddo, Kern and Helen more than making up for the negative traits in the townspeople, Cole ends the film saying "There is always someone or something worthwhile...if we just look hard enough".
