= Come September =

1961 film by Robert Mulligan

- Theatrical release poster
- Directed by: Robert Mulligan
- Screenplay by: Stanley Shapiro; Maurice Richlin
- Story by: Stanley Roberts; Robert Russell
- Produced by: Robert Arthur
- Starring: Rock Hudson; Gina Lollobrigida; Sandra Dee; Bobby Darin; Walter Slezak
- Cinematography: William Daniels
- Edited by: Russell F. Schoengarth
- Music by: Hans J. Salter
- Production companies: 7 Pictures Corporation; Raoul Walsh Enterprises
- Distributed by: Universal-International Pictures
- Release date: August 9, 1961
- Running time: 112 minutes
- Languages: English; Italian
- Box office: $5.8 million or $7.5 million

Come September is a 1961 American romantic comedy film directed by Robert Mulligan and starring Rock Hudson, Gina Lollobrigida, Sandra Dee, Bobby Darin, and Walter Slezak. Set and shot in Italy, the film was the first produced by Hudson's film production company, 7 Pictures Corporation, in co-production with Raoul Walsh Enterprises.

== Plot ==
Wealthy American businessman Robert Talbot owns a villa on the Ligurian coast, where he and his Roman lover, Lisa Fellini, spend time together only in September each year. Determined to stop settling for an annual affair, Lisa is preparing to marry Spencer, an eager but unexciting fiancé. When Robert calls Lisa en route from Milano for an impromptu fling in July, however, Lisa loses her resolve, cancels her wedding, and rushes to meet him.

Since Robert only stays at his villa one month each year, his crafty and enterprising majordomo, Maurice Clavell, has converted the villa into a luxury hotel, which he has run over six years, shutting down over September. Presently, the "hotel" is hosting a group of college girls, including Sandy Stevens and their chaperone Margaret Allison. When Robert beats his telegram to the villa, catching Maurice unaware, Maurice must deceive and juggle his boss and his guests to keep both his job and his hotel business.

On his drive to the villa, Robert encounters four college boys, led by Tony, who mock Robert's age (not yet 40) and conservative luxury convertible. Denied their reservations, the college boys set up camp outside the villa when they see the girls. Since the hotel guests are expected to check out the next day, Maurice tells his boss that they are tourists, stranded through a mishap, appealing to his gallantry to host them for a single night. Maurice tells the guests that Robert is a mentally ill "shell shocked" veteran, son of the villa's former owners, who in his delusion believes he still owns the villa. When Robert gives Maurice orders in front of the guests, Maurice pretends to compassionately tolerate the behavior and asks them to play along. Unfortunately for Maurice's manipulations, the guests’ departure is delayed when Margaret slips on a champagne cork and is hospitalized. Robert soon learns about Maurice's hotel venture when psychology major Sandy tries to treat Robert's "delusion," explaining to him that he no longer owns the hotel. Robert restrains himself from firing his devious majordomo when Lisa intercedes on his behalf and when Maurice describes the care he has put into maintaining the villa at his own expense. At Lisa's amused urging, Robert plays along with the hotel ruse during the guests’ stay.

Upon seeing the college boys' drunken partying with the girls, Robert is determined to protect the girls from perceived predatory behavior. Taking Lisa along, Robert chaperones the college students on a long, hilly bicycle sightseeing tour, hoping to exhaust them of amorous energy. At a nightclub, Robert dances with each girl, stressing the importance of virtue for respectful treatment. A drunken Tony makes a failed romantic advance toward Sandy. When Sandy tells Lisa of the lecture she received from Robert, Lisa becomes infuriated by Robert's double standard. Perceiving that Robert fails to respect her for "lapsed virtue", Lisa departs the next morning to reunite with her former fiancé Spencer.

Accompanied by Maurice, Robert chases Lisa in a truck hauling caged geese that he steals through misunderstanding. He proposes to Lisa to appease her but she refuses his lack of enthusiasm and flees. Maneuvering to have them detained together so Robert can plead his case to Lisa, Maurice tells the police that Robert is a notorious criminal and that Lisa is his accomplice, but his plan fails. Lisa returns to her apartment, joined by Sandy, who laments about lost love and missed opportunities. During a fitting for her wedding gown, Lisa has an epiphany of what life would be like settling for Spencer. Still wearing her wedding gown, she sets off to reunite with Robert. On her way, she encounters Tony, whom she directs to her apartment where he and Sandy reunite.

At the train station, seeing Lisa in her wedding gown through the train's window, an angry Robert refuses to leave the train that is about to depart. Lisa borrows a toddler to convince the conductor that the father is abandoning them. Taken off the train, but mollified by the brazen ploy, Robert reconciles with Lisa. As a married couple, they return to the villa to find Maurice again running it as a hotel, now occupied by a group of nuns.

== Cast ==
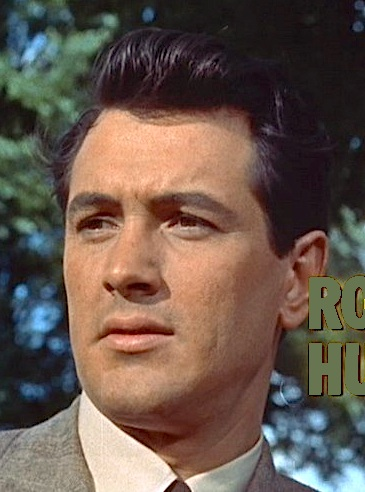
Rock Hudson plays Robert Talbot, whose protectiveness of American college girls irks his Italian mistress.

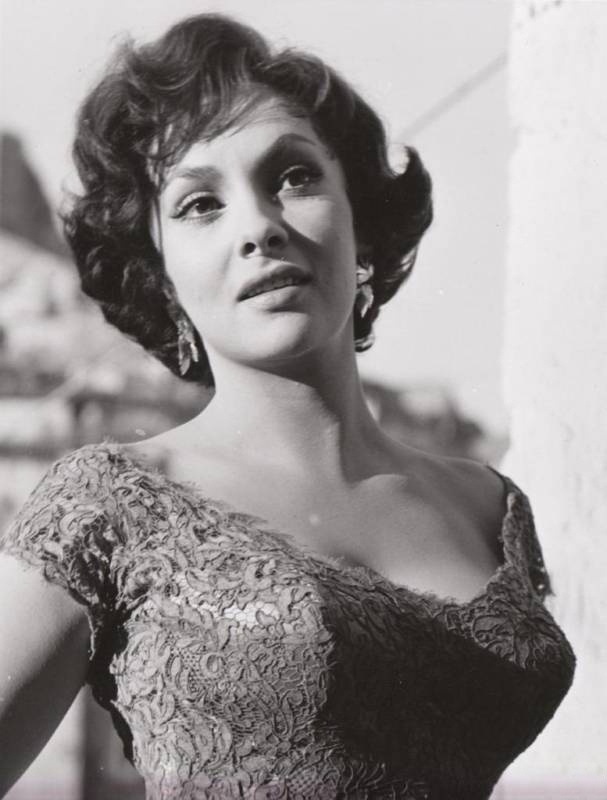
Gina Lollobrigida plays Lisa Fellini, who wants more than an annual liaison with Robert Talbot.

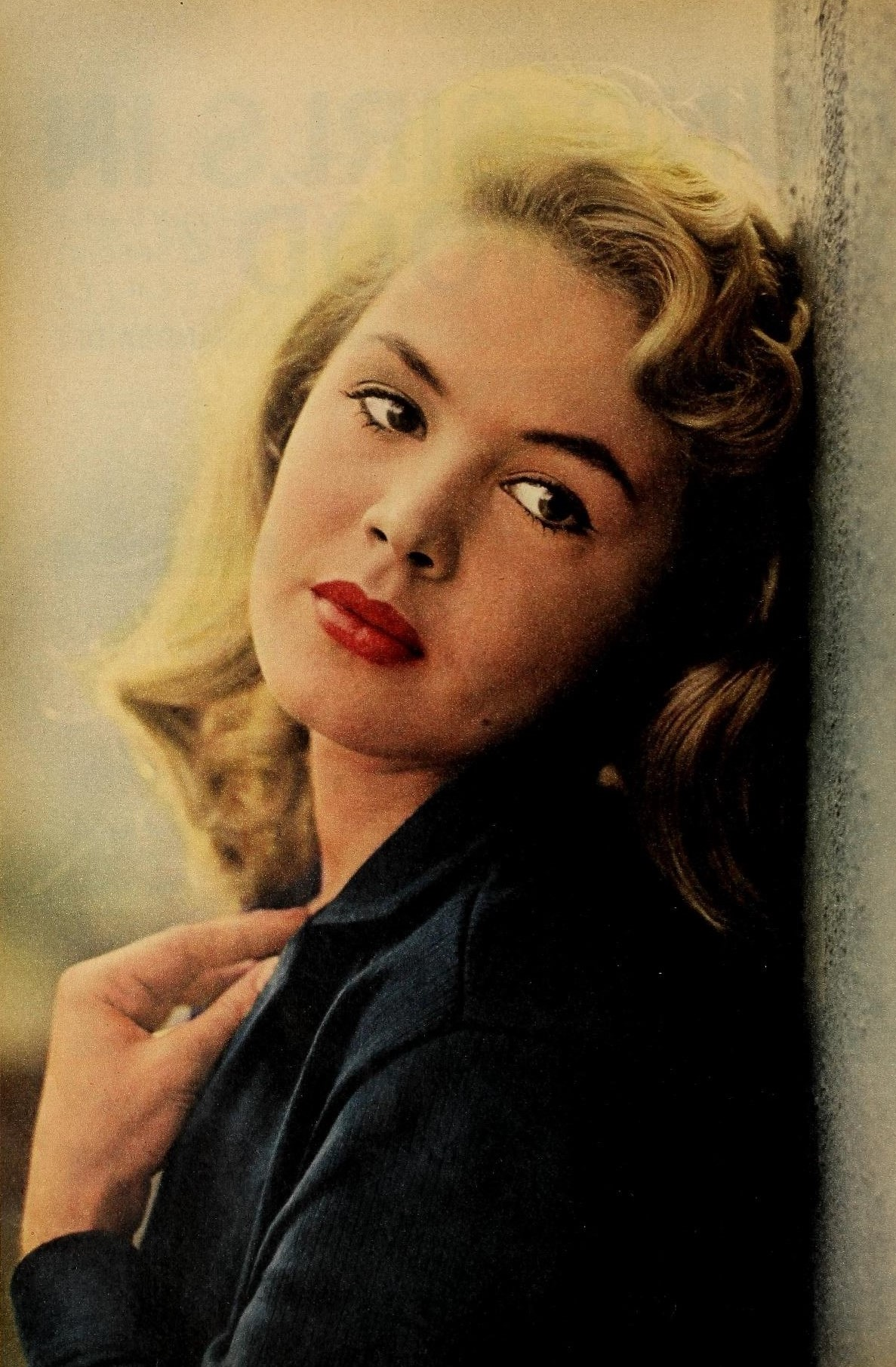
Sandra Dee, as Sandy Stevens, uses Robert Talbot's advice on romance to catch Tony.

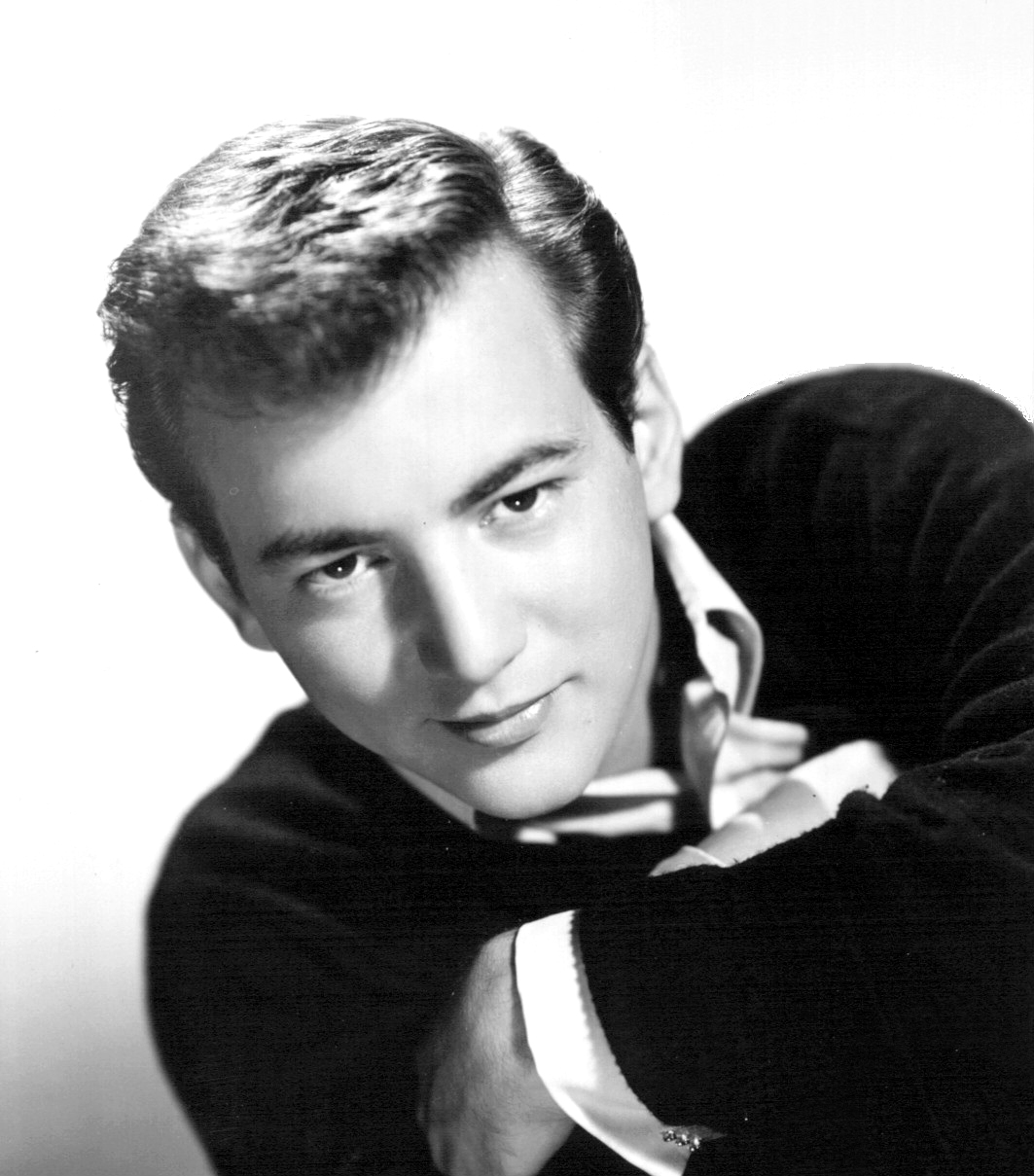
Bobby Darin plays Tony, college student touring Italy who falls for Sandy.

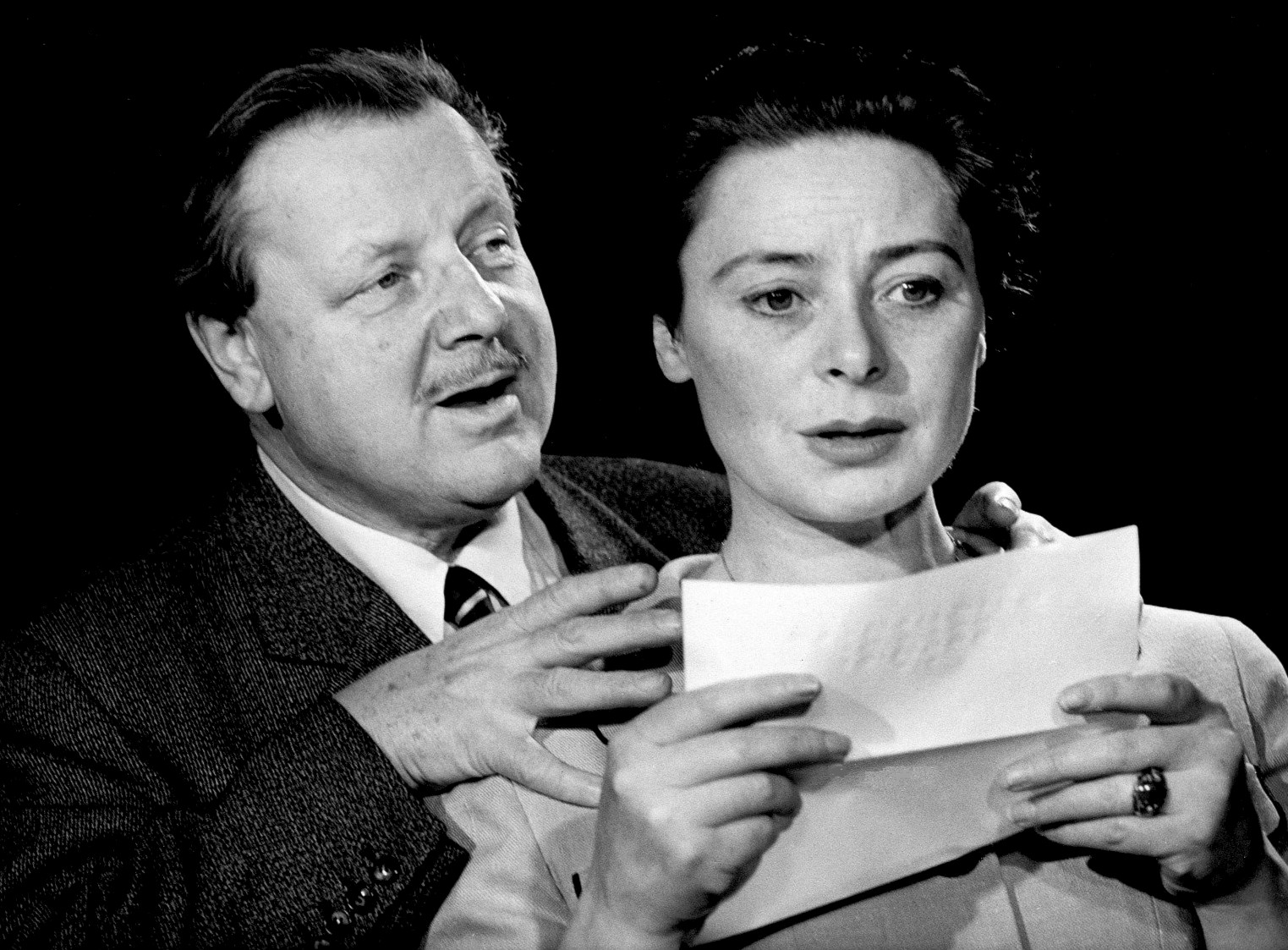
Walter Slezak (left) plays Maurice Clavell, servant who profits off Talbot's villa during 11-month absences.

- Rock Hudson as Robert L. Talbot
- Gina Lollobrigida as Lisa Helena Fellini
- Sandra Dee as Sandy Stevens
- Bobby Darin as Tony
- Walter Slezak as Maurice Clavell
- Brenda de Banzie as Margaret Allison
- Rossana Rory as Anna
- Ronald Howard as Spencer
- Joel Grey as Beagle
- Ronnie Haran as Sparrow
- Chris Seitz as Larry
- Cindy Conroy as Julia
- Joan Freeman as Linda
- Nancy Anderson as Patricia
- Michael Eden as Ron
- Claudia Brack as Carol

== Production ==
Screenwriters Stanley Shapiro and Maurice Richlin began work on the script in late 1959. While the film was in preproduction, Shapiro said in an interview: "I write all day at my office from 8:30 until 6:00, then have dinner and go home and spend two or three hours fixing, polishing or rewriting the day's output."

In early 1960, it was announced that Rock Hudson and Gina Lollobrigida were set to star. Before Lollobrigida's participation was confirmed, Marilyn Monroe was rumored to be cast. It was also announced that production was to be delayed until Hudson completed work on The Last Sunset (1961). Lollobrigida also had commitments to the films Go Naked in the World (1961) and Lady L (1965). In June 1960, Robert Mulligan signed as the film's director.

A month later, it was announced that singer Bobby Darin was to make his film debut in Come September. He and Sandra Dee met while on location, fell in love and married on December 1, 1960. The making of Come September is portrayed in the 2004 Darin biopic Beyond the Sea, starring Kevin Spacey as Darin and Kate Bosworth as Dee.

Principal photography began on September 7, 1960. Location filming took place in Portofino, Italy, while soundstage work occurred at Cinecittà Studios in Rome. Lollobrigida was reluctant because she was not enthusiastic about returning to Italy. In an interview, she mentioned accepting the role because it allowed her to work with Hudson and explained: "It's a comedy that can only be made in Italy."

== Music ==
Bobby Darin composed the Come September theme as well as the song "Multiplication" that he performs at a club in the film.

== Novelization ==
In advance of the film's release, a paperback novelization of the film written by crime and mystery novelist Marvin H. Albert was published by Dell Books.

== Reception ==
On the review aggregator website Rotten Tomatoes, Come September holds an approval rating of 86% based on seven reviews, with an average rating of 6.3/10.

== Remakes ==
Come September has been remade as the Hindi-language films Kashmir Ki Kali (1964) and Mere Sanam (1965) and as the Tamil-language film Anbe Vaa (1966). The 1980 Hindi film Ek Baar Kaho was also loosely based on Come September.

== See also ==
- List of American films of 1961
