= Tammy and the Doctor =

1963 film by Harry Keller

- Theatrical release poster
- Directed by: Harry Keller
- Written by: Oscar Brodney
- Produced by: Ross Hunter
- Starring: Sandra Dee; Peter Fonda; Macdonald Carey; Beulah Bondi; Margaret Lindsay; Reginald Owen
- Cinematography: Russell Metty
- Edited by: Milton Carruth
- Music by: Frank Skinner
- Production company: Ross Hunter Productions
- Distributed by: Universal Pictures
- Release date: May 29, 1963
- Running time: 88 minutes
- Country: United States
- Language: English
- Box office: $2 million (US and Canada rentals)

Tammy and the Doctor is a 1963 American romantic comedy film directed by Harry Keller and starring Sandra Dee and Peter Fonda in his film debut, with Macdonald Carey, Beulah Bondi, Margaret Lindsay, and Reginald Owen in supporting roles. It is the third of the four Tammy films.

== Plot ==
Mrs. Call requires surgery in Los Angeles and is accompanied there by her young companion Tammy, a country girl from Mississippi, who later lands a job with the hospital staff. Tammy is attracted to handsome Dr. Mark Cheswick, whose superior, Dr. Bentley, and head nurse Rachel Coleman aren't sure that romance is a good idea.

== Cast ==
- Sandra Dee as Tambrey "Tammy" Tyree
- Peter Fonda as Dr. Mark Cheswick
- Macdonald Carey as Dr. Wayne Bentley
- Beulah Bondi as Mrs. Call
- Margaret Lindsay as Rachel Coleman
- Reginald Owen as Jason Tripp
- Alice Pearce as Millie
- Adam West as Dr. Eric Hassler
- Joan Marshall as Vera
- Stanley Clements as Wally Day
- Doodles Weaver as Traction patient
- Mitzi Hoag as Pamela

== Production ==
The film was announced in December 1961 as Tammy Takes Over. Dee made it after another film for Hunter, If a Man Answers.

Ross Hunter liked to develop new talent and the film features 23 actors who had never appeared in a film before. Among them was Peter Fonda, who had enjoyed critical acclaim for his performance in Blood, Sweat and Stanley Poole. Hunter signed Peter Fonda to a seven-year contract. FilmInk magazine argued Fonda at this stage of his career was "a sort of poor man's James Stewart – tall, gangly, boy next door, virginal looks, etc. (And Stewart was, famously, best friends with Fonda's father, Henry)."
