= Six Black Horses =

1962 film by Harry Keller

- Film poster
- Directed by: Harry Keller
- Written by: Burt Kennedy
- Produced by: Gordon Kay
- Starring: Audie Murphy; Dan Duryea; Joan O'Brien
- Cinematography: Maury Gertsman
- Edited by: Aaron Stell
- Color process: Eastmancolor
- Production company: Universal Pictures
- Distributed by: Universal Pictures
- Release dates: March 9, 1962 (Los Angeles); March 28, 1962 (San Francisco); April 24, 1962 (United States)
- Running time: 80 minutes
- Country: United States
- Language: English
- Budget: $500,000

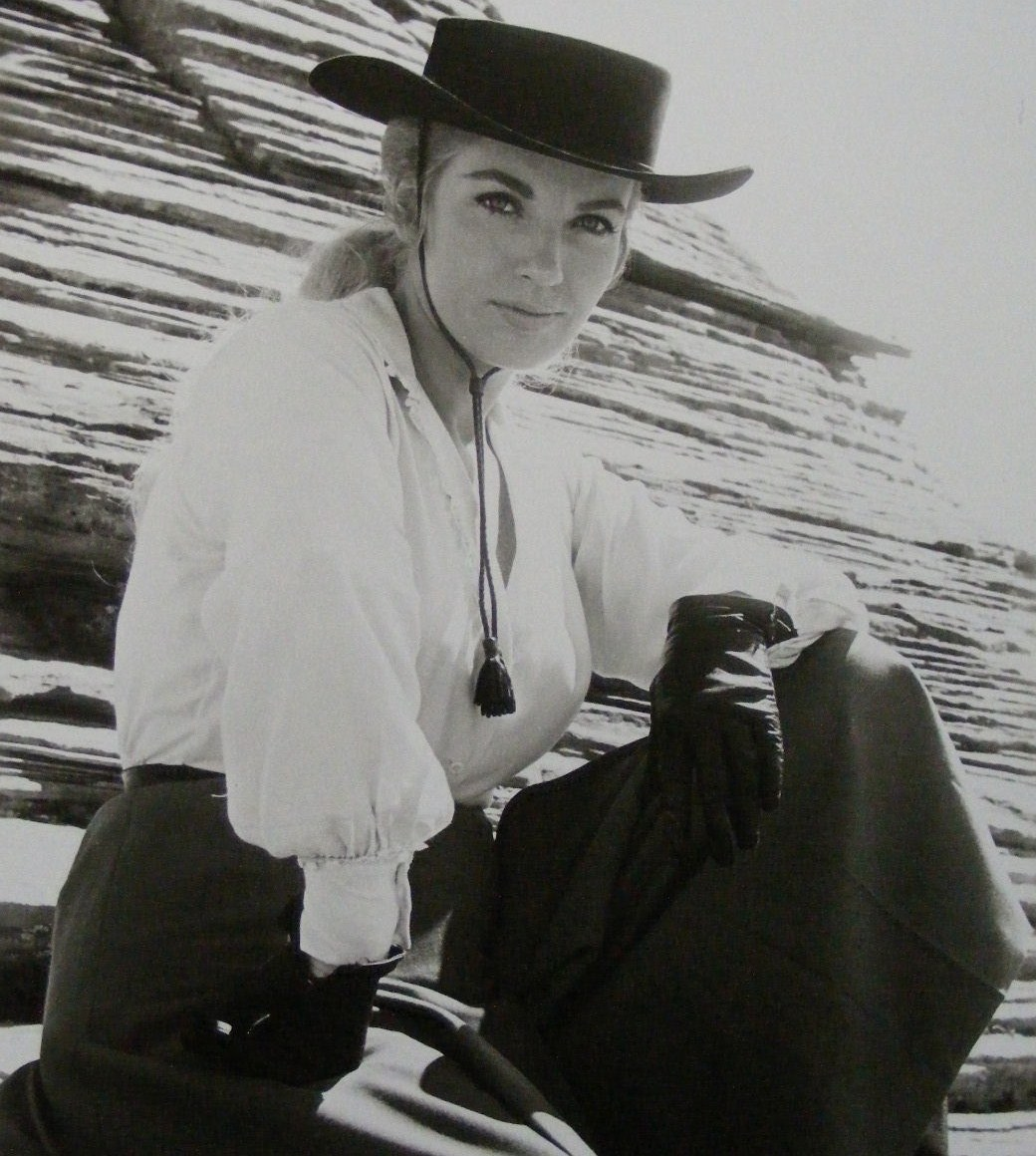
Publicity still with Joan O'Brien for film

Six Black Horses is a 1962 American Western film directed by Harry Keller and starring Audie Murphy, Dan Duryea and Joan O'Brien.

== Plot ==
Ben Lane, whose own horse has broken down, is breaking a horse in the desert that he believes to be a stray. He is caught by some ranchers who treat him as a horse thief and are about to hang him when he is saved by Frank Jesse. They ride into Perdido together, where they are ambushed by two gunmen. After they kill the gunmen, Lane and Jesse are hired by Kelly, who offers them $1,000 each to take her through Apache territory to be with her husband. In reality, she is setting up Jesse because he killed her husband in a shootout. Lane rescues a collie that goes with him everywhere, including riding the pack horse.

== Cast ==
- Audie Murphy as Ben Lane
- Dan Duryea as Frank Jesse
- Joan O'Brien as Kelly
- George Wallace as Will Boone
- Roy Barcroft as Mustanger
- Bob Steele as Puncher
- Henry Wills as Indian leader
- Phil Chambers as Undertaker
- Charlita as Mexican dancer (as Charlita Regis)
- Dale Van Sickel as Man

== Production ==
Universal hired Burt Kennedy to write an original film script. Kennedy said he wrote it with Richard Widmark in mind.

Parts of the film were shot at Snow Canyon and Leeds in Utah.

== Comic book adaption ==
- Dell Movie Classic: Six Black Horses (January 1963)

== See also ==
- List of American films of 1962
