= Tammy Tell Me True =

1961 film by Harry Keller

- Theatrical release poster
- Directed by: Harry Keller
- Written by: Oscar Brodney
- Based on: Tammy Tell Me True by Cid Ricketts Sumner
- Produced by: Ross Hunter
- Starring: Sandra Dee; John Gavin; Beulah Bondi; Charles Drake; Virginia Grey; Julia Meade
- Cinematography: Clifford Stine
- Edited by: Otto Ludwig
- Music by: Percy Faith
- Production company: Ross Hunter Productions
- Distributed by: Universal Pictures
- Release date: July 26, 1961 (New York City)
- Running time: 97 minutes
- Country: United States
- Language: English
- Box office: $2.5 million

Tammy Tell Me True is a 1961 American Eastmancolor comedy film directed by Harry Keller and starring Sandra Dee and John Gavin, Beulah Bondi, Charles Drake, Virginia Grey and Julia Meade.

The film, the second in the series, was based on Cid Ricketts Sumner's 1959 novel of the same name, which the New York Times had described as "a cheerful change of pace from current novels of conflict and depression".

== Plot ==
Tambrey (Tammy) Tyree is waiting to hear from her lover Pete, who has gone to agricultural college. She has been staying at Brentwood Hall and writing to Peter but has received no letters in return. She decides to go . Her grandfather, reverend Dimwitty is still in jail for selling corn liquor, so Tammy returns to her houseboat where she meets Captain Joe. Tanny tells him she wants to go to college to improve herself for when Pete comes back home. Her plan is to take the Ellen B down the river to the college but Joe offers her a tow.

Near the college she meets Buford Woodly. Then she meets Professor Thomas Freeman who she overhears reading from As You Like it. He teaches public speaking and he suggests she find work as a companion to Mrs. Theadore Call who gave the park land to the college. Mrs. Call has a niece, Suzanne, who is running her household. Students mock Tammy's appearance but Rita takes her to see the Dean of Women, Miss Jenks, who accepts her and gives Tammy the address of Mrs. Call. Suzzane interviews and dismisses Tammy, but she climbs a tree and meets Mrs. Call. Mrs. Call is harsh and doesn’t want her either until she learns that Tammy lives on a ‘shanty boat.' Mrs. Call once had an uncle with a shanty boat where she stayed one summer when she was 10. Mrs. Call agrees to stay with Tammy and arrives at night to avoid being followed by Suzanne. In the morning they catch a fish.

Tammy goes to her first class with Prof. Freeman, but when she speaks the class mocks her. She goes home to Mrs. Call who comforts her. She asks Tammy to go to her house to get her raincoat and gives her a key. Tammy goes to work as a babysitter, which she loves doing. We learn that she’s never heard of TV. After work Tammy goes to Ms. Call’s house and collects the raincoat. She sees a picture of Ms. Call’s son Bill with Tom Freeman, but Suzanne has come home early from New Orleans and almost catches her. Suzanne calls the police. Ms. Call is worried and tells Tammy that Tom Freeman was driving the car when her son was killed. She knows the wreck wasn’t his fault but has never forgiven him. Tammy thinks Mrs. Call reminds her of her grandmother.

Suzanne calls Mrs. Call's lawyer, Joshua Welling, and insists that her aunt is unstable and needs to be found and brought home for Suzanne to look after. Suzzane insists on taking control of her aunt’s fortune, confirming Ms. Call’s feeling that her niece does not care about her but only wants her money. Tammy returns to the dean’s office for her next job and finds Miss Jenks crying. She sends Tammy to babysit for “progressive parents” of 3 boys who will not allow anyone to tell them, “No.” She returns briefly to the shanty boat to find Mrs. Call flirting with Captain Joe. Mrs. Call calls herself Shanty-boat Annie to conceal her identity from Joe who is already aware that police are trying to find a of a Mrs. Call. Tammy invites Joe to stay for dinner while she goes to work. At the new job she finds one child smoking, another tormenting a kitten, and the third communicates only through screaming. She stops their misbehavior and makes dinner for them. She learns that the boys have never heard stories from the bible after telling them the story of Adam and Eve.

Tammy meets Professor Freeman on her way home and learns that Miss Jenks is actually married to Mr. Woodly. They talk on the deck and find they are attracted. Mrs. Call tells Tammy that Tom is in love with her and that Tammy probably only imagined being in love with Pete. Tammy sings and decides to write one last letter to Pete. The next day the police drive by in a boat looking for Mrs. Call but don’t recognize ‘Annie.’ Mrs. Call insists that if Suzzane finds her, that she will try to have her put into an institution so Suzzane can gain conservatorship of Mrs. Call’s estate. Tammy tries to put on her ‘China-berry-bead’ necklace before going to speak to Tom’s class, but it breaks so Mrs. Call gives Tammy her own necklace. She runs into Mr. Woodly who insists on having her sit for him to do her portrait. She stays for a little while before going to class and speaking on how disparaging the other students are. They are ashamed and applaud her.

While mailing Pete’s letter, Tammy runs into Suzzane who recognizes her aunt’s necklace and has her arrested. Joshua Welling arrives at the jail to inform Tammy that Suzzane has placed Mrs. Call in hospital. Mr. Welling does not believe Mrs. Call is incapable of managing her affairs and offers to represent both women. Tom bails Tammy out of jail and warns her that she might be expelled. She goes to see Miss Jenks, who believes Tammy is innocent. Tammy tells Miss Jenks how intimidated her husband is by his wife’s success and encourages her to pursue adoption.

The next scene is the hearing to determine Mrs. Call’s competency. Most of the witnesses testify to her contrary nature until Miss Jenks notes the change since meeting Tammy. During the break Mr. Welling insists that Tammy needs to testify. She agrees but finds herself too nervous to speak. Tom takes over the questioning, which gives her the courage to speak. She tells of the way Mrs. Call changed and improved and the relationship that has grown between them. The judge finds in favor of Mrs. Call. As Tom is walking Tammy back home he offers to put Mrs. Call’s necklace on for her. The necklace falls down her blouse and rather than fall through to the ground, she finds it caught in her cleavage. She retrieves it and declares that she is a “woman, fully-growed.”

== Cast ==
- Sandra Dee as Tambrey "Tammy" Tyree
- John Gavin as Tom Freeman
- Charles Drake as Buford Woodly
- Virginia Grey as "Miss" Jenks
- Julia Meade as Suzanne Rook
- Beulah Bondi as Mrs. Call
- Cecil Kellaway as Captain Joe
- Edgar Buchanan as Judge Carver
- Gigi Perreau as Rita
- Juanita Moore as Della
- Hayden Rorke as Joshua Welling
- Ward Ramsey as Caleb Slade
- Henry Corden as Captain Armand
- Don Dorrell as Roger
- Patricia McNulty as Joan
- Stefanie Powers as Kay (credited as 'Taffy Paul')
- Lowell Brown as John
- Bill Herrin as Phil (as William Herrin)
- Catherine McLeod as Mrs. Bateman
- Ross Elliott as Professor Bateman
- Ned Wever as Dr. Stach

== Production ==
Sandra Dee was announced for the lead role in September 1960.

The Welsh singer Dorothy Squires wrote the words and music to the title song "Tammy Tell Me True".

== Reception ==
The Chicago Tribune called it "calculated cuteness... relieved by a likeable performance from Sandra Dee." The Washington Post called it "infinitely inferior to the first Tammy, everything about the film is false, especially the aggressive Sandra Dee, whose primpsy whimsy wardrobe cannot disguise the acquisitive gaze in her give-away eyes."

In a 1974 interview, Gavin criticised the film but said it "haunts the tube like a permanent miasma. You can't do worse than that."
