= George Montgomery (actor) =

American actor (1916–2000)

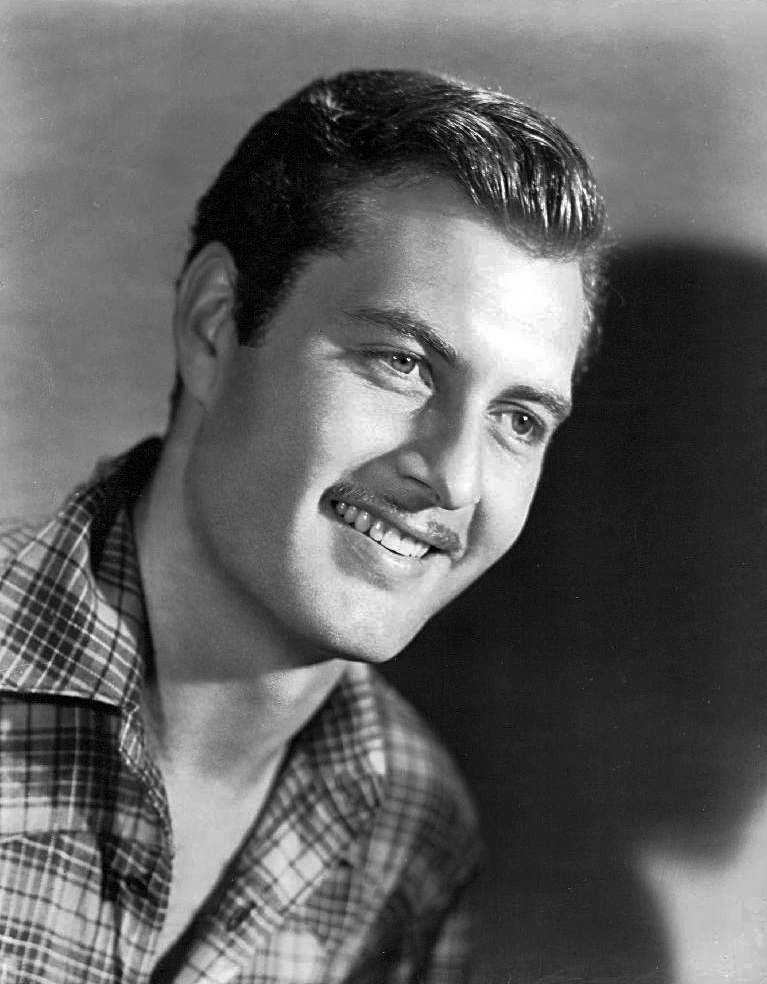
- Montgomery in 1943
- Born: George Montgomery Letz; August 27, 1916; Brady, Montana, U.S.
- Died: December 12, 2000 (aged 84); Rancho Mirage, California, U.S.
- Education: University of Montana (dropped out)
- Occupation: Actor
- Years active: 1935–1985
- Spouse: Dinah Shore (m. 1943; div. 1962)
- Children: 2

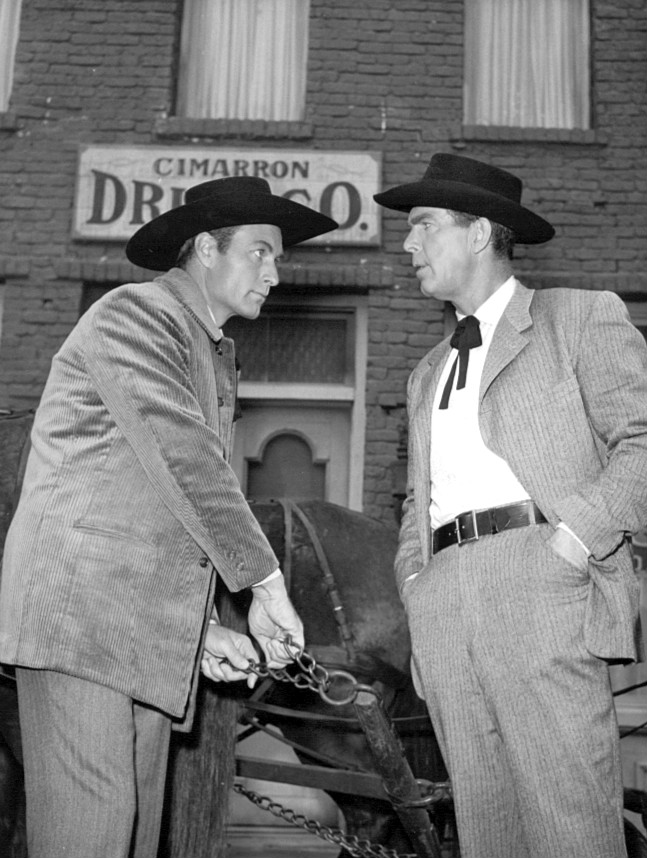
George Montgomery and Fred MacMurray on TV's Cimarron City (1958)

George Montgomery (born George Montgomery Letz; August 27, 1916 – December 12, 2000) was an American actor, best known for his work in Western films and television. He was also a painter, director, producer, writer, sculptor, furniture craftsman, and stuntman. He was engaged to Hedy Lamarr in 1941, and married Dinah Shore in 1943.

== Early years ==
Montgomery was born George Montgomery Letz in 1916, the youngest of 15 children of German immigrant parents from Mykolaiv in southern Ukraine. He was born in Brady, in Pondera County, northern Montana near Great Falls. He was reared on a large ranch, where he learned to ride horses and work cattle as a part of daily life.

Montgomery boxed as a heavyweight for a short while before enrolling in the University of Montana in Missoula. He was active in school athletics and majored in interior design, but he left after one year.

== Career ==
Montgomery was more interested in a career in film than in a college education. Therefore, he left Montana for Hollywood. Two days after his arrival there, he was working as a stunt man on a Greta Garbo film at MGM, Conquest (1937).

=== Republic Pictures ===
At Republic Pictures, his cowboy skills gained him stunt work and a small acting part at the age of 18 in a 1935 Gene Autry film, The Singing Vagabond.

He followed this with bit parts and additional stunt work as "George Letz" in mostly low-budget films. These included Springtime in the Rockies (1937) with Autry, The Purple Vigilantes (1938) with Robert Livingston, the serial The Lone Ranger (1938), Outlaws of Sonora (1938) with Livingston, The Old Barn Dance (1938) and Gold Mine in the Sky (1938) with Autry, Under Western Stars (1938) with Roy Rogers and Shine On, Harvest Moon (1938) with Rogers.

Those had all been Westerns. He was in an African adventure tale Hawk of the Wilderness (1938) with Bruce Bennett (billed as Herman Brix, his real name) and the bigger-budgeted Army Girl (1938).

In 1938, he appeared as one of the six men suspected of being the titular hero in The Lone Ranger. That year, Life included him in a photo montage of "Hollywood's Movie-struck Kids" and described Montgomery, still using his full name, as "6 ft. 3 in. tall, weighs 210 lb., rides well, is superlatively handsome."

He went back to Westerns in Southward Ho (1939) and The Arizona Kid (1939) with Rogers. He was in some non-Westerns such as The Mysterious Miss X (1939), S.O.S. Tidal Wave (1939), and I Was a Convict (1939), but mostly it was films such as South of the Border (1939) and In Old Monterey (1939) with Autry, Saga of Death Valley (1939), Wall Street Cowboy (1939), Frontier Pony Express (1939), Rough Riders' Round-up (1939), In Old Caliente (1939) with Rogers and The Night Riders (1939) with John Wayne. He worked on Republic's (relatively) big-budget Man of Conquest (1939).

=== 20th Century Fox ===
In 1939, he signed with 20th Century Fox, which billed him as George Montgomery.

His first film at the studio was The Cisco Kid and the Lady (1939), the first of the Cisco Kid series. Montgomery was billed fourth. He had a small role in Star Dust (1940), and a bigger one in Young People (1940), Shirley Temple's last film for Fox.

Montgomery was fourth-billed in a "B" about pilots, Charter Pilot (1940) with Lloyd Nolan and Lynn Bari, and third-billed in Jennie (1940).

=== Leading man ===
Montgomery was promoted to leading roles in a melodrama written by Dalton Trumbo, Accent on Love (1941). Fox then starred him in some B Westerns: Last of the Duanes (1941), Riders of the Purple Sage (1941), and The Cowboy and the Blonde (1941). One writer called him "a handsome leading man in the Clark Gable mode."

Montgomery was teamed with Carole Landis in Cadet Girl (1941). He was given the lead in an "A" when he top-lined Orchestra Wives (1942) with Ann Rutherford, a film best remembered today for its authentic Big Band music and Glenn Miller in a realistic co-starring role as the titular orchestra's bandleader.

He starred in Ten Gentlemen from West Point (1942) with Maureen O'Hara, playing a role originally intended for Tyrone Power.

He was Ginger Rogers' love interest in Roxie Hart (1942) and played opposite Gene Tierney in China Girl (1942) for Henry Hathaway. All these films were popular at the box office.

The following year, Montgomery starred with Betty Grable in the Walter Lang-directed film Coney Island, which was his biggest hit to date. According to one obituary, "The actor's vocal mannerisms were often uncannily reminiscent of Clark Gable, and when he grew a moustache his similarities to the greater star were even more apparent. This was never more so than in Coney Island.

He also starred in Bomber's Moon (1943).

=== World War II ===
Montgomery was announced for several films originally intended for Fox leading men Tyrone Power, who had joined the Marine Corps, and Henry Fonda, who had joined the Navy, including Down to the Sea in Ships and Bird of Paradise with Tierney. However, Montgomery wound up joining the U.S. Army Air Forces First Motion Picture Unit in 1943 where he appeared in such training films as Survival of the Fittest (1944).

He returned to Fox in 1946, and played the lead in a musical Three Little Girls in Blue (1946). Fox then cast him as Philip Marlowe in The Brasher Doubloon (1947), a B-picture version of the novel The High Window by Raymond Chandler.

Montgomery was unhappy at Fox. The song "This is Always", Montgomery's major duet (albeit dubbed) with June Haver in Three Little Girls in Blue, was cut, and he was assigned to a minor Western, Belle Starr's Daughter (1948). Montgomery left Fox in September 1947 unhappy with his roles.

=== Low-budget action star ===
Montgomery appeared in Lulu Belle (1948) and The Girl from Manhattan for Benedict Bogeaus.

In 1950, he starred as the title role in Davy Crockett, Indian Scout for Edward Small. He went back to Fox for Dakota Lil (1950) and made The Iroquois Trail (1950) and The Texas Rangers (1951) for Small.

Montgomery tried a swashbuckler at Fox, The Sword of Monte Cristo (1951), then returned to Small for Indian Uprising (1951) and Cripple Creek (1952), Gun Belt (1953), and The Lone Gun (1954). For Sam Katzman, he made The Pathfinder (1952), Fort Ti (1952), Jack McCall, Desperado (1953), The Battle of Rogue River (1954), and Seminole Uprising (1955).

Montgomery worked for other producers: Robbers' Roost (1955), Huk! (1956), a war movie shot in the Philippines, Canyon River (1956), Pawnee (1957), Black Patch (1957), Gun Duel in Durango (1957) for Small, Street of Sinners (1957), a rare non-Western, Last of the Badmen (1957), Man from God's Country (1958), The Toughest Gun in Tombstone (1958) and Badman's Country (1958) as Pat Garrett.

=== Television ===
In the 1958–59 season, Montgomery starred in his own 26-episode NBC Western series, Cimarron City as Mayor Matt Rockford, with co-stars John Smith and Audrey Totter through his own production company Mont Productions. Montgomery claimed to have turned down the lead roles in the Western television series Gunsmoke and Wagon Train. Cimarron City ran one season.

Montgomery made an Imperial adventure for MGM, Watusi (1959), a sequel to King Solomon's Mines (1950). He followed it with King of the Wild Stallions (1959).

He made guest appearances on a number of television shows, including NBC's Bonanza and The Gisele MacKenzie Show.

=== Director ===
Montgomery turned director with The Steel Claw (1961), a war film shot in the Philippines, which he also co-wrote and in which he starred.

He was in Samar (1962), From Hell to Borneo (1963), and Guerillas in Pink Lace (1964).

He was going to make Outlaw of Red River for Robert Lippert in Spain, but it appears to have not been made.

As an actor, he was in the filmed-in-Spain Battle of the Bulge (1965) and Django the Condemned (1966). He was in Hallucination Generation (1967), an anti-LSD movie. Montgomery was in Bomb at 10:10 (1967), Hostile Guns (1967), Warkill (1968), and Strangers at Sunrise (1970) (shot in South Africa). He also worked the dinner and stock theatre circuit, appearing in productions of Two for the Seesaw and A Hole in the Head.

He planned to make a Vietnam War film The Ho Chi Minh Trail in Bangkok and the Philippines, but the film was cancelled.

=== 1970s ===
Montgomery acted in and directed Satan's Harvest (1970), made in South Africa. He also starred in The Leo Chronicles (1972) and The Daredevil (1972), and helped produce The Proud and Damned (1972).

He starred in the TV movie Ride the Tiger (1970) and made guest appearances on 1970s television shows including The Odd Couple, The Six Million Dollar Man and Alias Smith and Jones.

== Other interests ==
As a boy, George Montgomery had become an excellent wood craftsman. As an adult, he began building furniture, first for himself and then for a few friends. His skill was such that his hobby became a full-fledged cabinet-making business, in which he employed as many as 20 craftsmen. He appeared in television advertisements for Pledge furniture cleaner during the 1970s.

Montgomery oversaw the furniture business for more than 40 years, and expanded his interest to house design. He became involved with the building of 11 homes for friends and family. His artistic instincts included learning how to sculpt in bronze. Self-taught, he sculpted upwards of 50 bronze sculptures of subjects such as John Wayne, Clint Eastwood, Gene Autry, Randolph Scott, and Ronald W. Reagan. He received renown in particular for a sculpture he did of Custer's Last Stand.

His sculpture of his former wife, Dinah Shore, and their children is displayed at the Mission Hills Country Club in Rancho Mirage, California.

In 1981, he published a book The Years of George Montgomery.

== Personal life ==
Montgomery was briefly engaged to actress Hedy Lamarr in 1941.

Montgomery and singer Dinah Shore married on December 5, 1943. They had one child, Melissa Ann Montgomery. George and Dinah also adopted a son, John David Montgomery, in 1954. They divorced in 1962.

In 1963, Montgomery's private life made headlines when his housekeeper was charged in a failed attempt to kill him. Allegedly suffering from a fanatical attraction to her employer, the woman planned to shoot Montgomery, then commit suicide.

== Death ==
Montgomery died at home on December 12, 2000, aged 84. After cremation, Montgomery's ashes were divided and interred at Forest Lawn Cemetery (Cathedral City) near his Palm Springs home and at the Highland Cemetery in Great Falls, Montana, near his birthplace.

== Legacy ==
For his contribution to the television industry, George Montgomery has a star on the Hollywood Walk of Fame at 6301 Hollywood Blvd. In 1995, a Golden Palm Star on the Palm Springs Walk of Stars was dedicated in his honor. He is also honored with a statue in the square of Plentywood, Montana.

== Filmography ==
=== Films ===
- The Singing Vagabond (1935) as Soldier (uncredited)
- Springtime in the Rockies (1937) as Cowhand at Dance (uncredited)
- The Purple Vigilantes (1938) as Gambler (uncredited)
- The Old Barn Dance (1938) as Rider (uncredited)
- The Lone Ranger (1938, Serial) as Jim Clark
- Outlaws of Sonora (1938) as Bank Teller (uncredited)
- Gold Mine in the Sky (1938) as Cowhand (uncredited)
- Under Western Stars (1938) as Cowhand (uncredited)
- Army Girl (1938) as Soldier (uncredited)
- Pals of the Saddle (1938) as Rider (uncredited)
- Billy the Kid Returns (1938) as Henchman (uncredited)
- Come On, Rangers (1938) as Ranger in Black Hat (uncredited)
- Hawk of the Wilderness (1938) as Tom (uncredited)
- Shine On, Harvest Moon (1938) as Rustler (uncredited)
- The Mysterious Miss X (1939) as Policeman (uncredited)
- I Was a Convict (1939) as Prison Guard (uncredited)
- Rough Riders' Round-up (1939) as Patrolman Joe (uncredited)
- Southward Ho (1939) (uncredited)
- The Night Riders (1939) as Mob Member (uncredited)
- Frontier Pony Express (1939) as Lieutenant Harris (uncredited)
- Man of Conquest (1939) as Young Lieutenant, Jackson Aide (uncredited)
- S.O.S. Tidal Wave (1939) (uncredited)
- In Old Caliente (1939) as Curly Henchman (uncredited)
- Wall Street Cowboy (1939) as Cowhand (uncredited)
- In Old Monterey (1939) as Soldier (uncredited)
- The Arizona Kid (1939) as Soldier (uncredited)
- Saga of Death Valley (1939) as Henchman (uncredited)
- South of the Border (1939) as Bandit (uncredited)
- The Cisco Kid and the Lady (1939) as Tommy Bates
- Star Dust (1940) as Ronnie
- Young People (1940) as Mike Shea
- Charter Pilot (1940) as Charlie Crane
- Jennie (1940) as Franz Schermer
- The Cowboy and the Blonde (1941) as Lank Garrett
- Accent on Love (1941) as John Worth Hyndman
- Last of the Duanes (1941) as Buck Duane
- Riders of the Purple Sage (1941) as Jim Lassiter
- Cadet Girl (1941) as Tex Mallory
- Roxie Hart (1942) as Homer Howard
- Ten Gentlemen from West Point (1942) as Joe Dawson
- Orchestra Wives (1942) as Bill Abbot
- China Girl (1942) as Johnny Williams
- Coney Island (1943) as Eddie Johnson
- Bomber's Moon (1943) as Capt. Jeffrey Dakin
- Survival of the Fittest (1944) as a downed USAAF pilot
- Three Little Girls in Blue (1946) as Van Damm Smith
- The Brasher Doubloon (1947) as Philip Marlowe
- Lulu Belle (1948) as George Davis
- The Girl from Manhattan (1948) as Rev. Tom Walker
- Belle Starr's Daughter (1948) as Marshal Tom Jackson
- Davy Crockett, Indian Scout (1950) as Davy Crockett
- Dakota Lil (1950) as Tom Horn / Steve Garrett
- The Iroquois Trail (1950) as Nat Cutler / Hawkeye
- The Sword of Monte Cristo (1951) as Captain Renault
- The Texas Rangers (1951) as Johnny Carver
- Indian Uprising (1952) as Capt Chas McCloud
- Cripple Creek (1952) as Bret Ivers
- The Pathfinder (1952) as Pathfinder
- Jack McCall, Desperado (1953) as Jack McCall
- Fort Ti (1953) as Capt. Jed Horn
- Gun Belt (1953) as Billy Ringo
- Battle of Rogue River (1954) as Maj. Frank Archer
- The Lone Gun (1954) as Cruze
- Masterson of Kansas (1954) as Bat Masterson
- Seminole Uprising (1955) as Lt. Carn Elliott
- Robbers' Roost (1955) as Jim 'Tex' Wall
- Canyon River (1956) as Steve Patrick
- Huk! (1956) as Greg Dickson
- Last of the Badmen (1957) as Dan Barton
- Gun Duel in Durango (1957) as Dan
- Street of Sinners (1957) as John Dean
- Pawnee (1957) as Paul 'Pale Arrow' Fletcher
- Black Patch (1957) as Marshal Clay Morgan
- Man from God's Country (1958) as Dan Beattie
- The Toughest Gun in Tombstone (1958) Captain Matt Sloane
- Badman's Country (1958) as Pat Garrett
- Watusi (1959) as Harry Quartermain
- King of the Wild Stallions (1959) as Randy Burke
- The Steel Claw (1961, also director, writer, producer) as Capt. John Larsen
- Samar (1962, also director, writer, producer) as Dr. John David Saunders
- Guerillas in Pink Lace (1964, also director, writer, producer) as Murphy
- Battle of the Bulge (1965) as Sgt. Duquesne
- Django the Condemned (1965) as Pat O'Brien
- Hallucination Generation (1966) as Eric
- Bomb at 10:10 (1967) as Steve Corbit
- Hostile Guns (1967) as Sheriff Gid McCool
- Hell of Borneo (1967) as John Dirkson (shot in 1963)
- Warkill (1968) as Col. John Hannegan
- Strangers at Sunrise (1969) as Grant Merrick
- Satan's Harvest (1969, also director, writer, producer) as Cutter Murdock
- The Leo Chronicles (1972)
- The Proud and the Damned (1972, producer)
- The Daredevil (1972) as Paul Tunney
- Blood, Money and Tears (1980)
- Wild Wind (1985) as Major Nestorovic (final film role)

=== Television ===
- Studio One in Hollywood (1955, episode "The Conviction of Peter Sea") as Bakeland
- Stage 7 (1955, episode "The Traveling Salesman") as Dan Kelly
- General Electric Theater (1955, episode "The Return of Gentleman Jim") as Gentleman Jim Corbett
- Screen Directors Playhouse (1956, episode "Claire") as Dr. Stanley Wayne
- Jane Wyman Presents The Fireside Theatre (1956, episode "Ten Percent") as Mark Weston
- The Ford Television Theatre (1957, episode "The Quiet Stranger") as Daniel McKee
- General Electric Theater (1957, episode "Thousand Dollar Gun") as Buchanan Smith
- Wagon Train (1957, episode "The Jesse Cowan Story") as Jesse Cowan S1 E17
- Cimarron City (1958–1959, TV Series) as Mayor Matt Rockford
- What's My Line? (1959) as mystery guest
- Sea Hunt (1960, Season 3, Episode 4)
- Hawaiian Eye (1963, episode "Boar Hunt") as Maitland
- Bonanza (1966, episode "The Code") as Dan Taggert
- I Spy (1966, episode "A Day Called 4 Jaguar") as Nicolai
- Ride the Tiger (1970, TV Movie, also directed)
- Alias Smith and Jones (1971, episode "Jailbreak at Junction City") as Curt Clitterhouse
- NET Playhouse (1972, episode "Portrait of the Hero as a Young Man") as Christopher Gist
- The Six Million Dollar Man (1974, episode "The Coward") as Christopher Bell / Garth
- The Odd Couple (1974, episode "The Hollywood Story") as Griff
- Children's Island (1984, TV Series) as The President

Preceded by Agnes Moorehead and Dick Powell; 20th Academy Awards	Academy Awards host 21st Academy Awards	Succeeded by Paul Douglas; 22nd Academy Awards
