= Robbers Roost (disambiguation) =

Robbers Roost was a hideout of Butch Cassidy and other outlaws in Utah.

Robbers Roost or Robber's Roost may also refer to:

- Robbers Roost (Kern County, California)
- Robbers Roost (Alder, Montana), listed on the NRHP in Montana
- Robbers Roost Canyon, a tributary of the Dirty Devil River, in Utah, named after the hideout
- Robbers' Roost (1932 film), a Western
- Robbers' Roost (1955 film), a Western
