= Wall Street Cowboy =

1939 film

- Directed by: Joseph Kane
- Written by: Gerald Geraghty (screenplay); Norman S. Hall (screenplay); Doris Schroeder (story)
- Starring: Roy Rogers
- Edited by: Lester Orlebeck
- Distributed by: Republic Pictures
- Release date: August 6, 1939
- Running time: 66 minutes 54 minutes
- Country: United States
- Language: English

Wall Street Cowboy is a 1939 American Western film directed by Joseph Kane and starring Roy Rogers.

== Plot ==
Wall Street stock marketeers try to swindle Roy Rogers out of his ranch, when molybdenum, a valuable mineral is discovered on the property, which the villains plan to use for their steel-mining activities. Unable to pay his mortgage thanks to a crooked financier (Ivan Miller), Roy and his friends ride east to stop the Wall Street crooks.

== Cast ==
- Roy Rogers as Roy Rogers
- George 'Gabby' Hayes as Gabby
- Raymond Hatton as Chuckawalla
- Ann Baldwin as Peggy Hammond
- Pierre Watkin as Roger Hammond
- Louisiana Lou as Louisiana Lou - Singer
- Craig Reynolds as Tony McGrath
- Ivan Miller as William Niles
- Reginald Barlow as Bainbridge
- Adrian Morris as Big Joe Gillespie
- Jack Roper as Gillespie Henchman
- Jack Ingram as Henchman McDermott

== Critical reception ==
Leonard Maltin wrote, "engaging Western with two sidekicks (Hayes and Hatton) touches upon Depression-era subjects of corrupt banking institutions and foreclosures; fun to watch Roy riding in a steeplechase and singing in a nightclub (wearing a coat and tie)"; and Dennis Schwartz wrote, "this Roy Rogers film had an undeserved bad reputation. I actually found it to be one of his better B Westerns, it was at least up to par with the typical Rogers action-packed oater except that the singing cowboy only sang a few songs. It uses the present as its setting. Joseph Kane ("The Arizona Kid"/"Jesse James at Bay"/"Frontier Pony Express") directs in his usual credible fashion and it's ably written by Gerald Geraghty and Norman S. Hall."
