= Silver Spurs (1943 film) =

1943 film by Joseph Kane

- Theatrical release poster
- Directed by: Joseph Kane
- Written by: John K. Butler; J. Benton Cheney
- Produced by: Harry Grey (associate producer)
- Starring: See below
- Cinematography: Reggie Lanning
- Edited by: Tony Martinelli
- Distributed by: Republic Pictures
- Release date: August 12, 1943
- Running time: 68 minutes (original version); 54 minutes (edited version)
- Country: United States
- Language: English

Silver Spurs is a 1943 American Western film directed by Joseph Kane.

== Plot ==
Roy's boss has inherited a very large ranch, but the will keeps him from selling it--although his widow could. Lucky Miller is out to get control of the ranch, so he has a girl come West to marry him, then after the wedding he has his henchman kill the owner. Roy is nearby, and when the murder gun is switched with his, he finds himself in jail.

== Cast ==
- Roy Rogers as Roy Rogers
- Trigger as Trigger, Roy's Horse
- Smiley Burnette as Frog
- John Carradine as Lucky Miller
- Phyllis Brooks as Mary Johnson
- Jerome Cowan as Jerry Johnson
- Joyce Compton as Millie Love
- Dick Wessel as Buck Walters
- Hal Taliaferro as Steve Corlan
- Forrest Taylor as Judge Pebble
- Charles C. Wilson as Mr. Hawkins
- Byron Foulger as Justice of the Peace
- Bob Nolan as Bob, Leader of the Sons of the Pioneers
- Sons of the Pioneers as Musicians, ranch hands

== Soundtrack ==
- "Tumbling Tumbleweeds" (Written by Bob Nolan)
- "Back in Your Own Backyard" (Written by Dave Dreyer, Billy Rose and Al Jolson)
- "Highways are Happy Ways (When They Lead the Way to Home)" (Music by Larry Shay, lyrics by Harry Harris and Tommie Malie)
- "When It's Springtime in the Rockies" (Music by Robert Sauer, lyrics by Mary Hale Woolsey)
