= Ride the Tiger =

Ride the Tiger may refer to:

- Ride the Tiger (album), by Yo La Tengo
- "Ride the Tiger", a song from the album Dragon Fly by Jefferson Starship
- "Ride the Tiger", a song from the album C'mon Kids by the Boo Radleys
- Ride the Tiger, a book by Julius Evola
- Ride the Tiger (film), a 1970 American film
