= The Lone Gun =

1954 film by Ray Nazarro

- Film poster
- Directed by: Ray Nazarro
- Screenplay by: Don Martin; Richard Schayer
- Story by: L. L. Foreman
- Starring: George Montgomery; Dorothy Malone
- Cinematography: Lester White
- Edited by: Buddy Small
- Music by: Irving Gertz
- Color process: Color
- Production company: World Films
- Distributed by: United Artists
- Release date: April 25, 1954
- Running time: 74 minutes
- Country: United States
- Language: English

The Lone Gun is a 1954 American Western film directed by Ray Nazarro and starring George Montgomery and Dorothy Malone.

It was originally known as Adios My Texas.

== Plot ==
After he drifts into town with Fairweather, a card-playing partner, Cruze accepts a job as town marshal and takes on the corrupt Moran brothers, cattle rustlers who are cheating rancher Charlotte Downing and her brother Cass. Cruze had previously been a lawman in another town but when the townspeople turned its back on him and refused to help out in his hour of need, Cruze vowed to never wear another badge. The same thing seems to happen in his new job until he discovers that Fairweather is not a "fair weather friend".

== Cast ==
- George Montgomery as Cruze
- Dorothy Malone as Charlotte Downing
- Frank Faylen as Fairweather
- Neville Brand as Tray Moran
- Skip Homeier as Cass Downing
- Douglas Kennedy as Gad Moran
- Douglas Fowley as Bartender
- Fay Roope as Mayor Booth
- Robert Wilke as Hort Moran
