= Dakota Lil =

1950 film by Lesley Selander

- Theatrical release poster
- Directed by: Lesley Selander
- Screenplay by: Maurice Geraghty
- Story by: Frank Gruber
- Produced by: Jack Jungmeyer
- Starring: George Montgomery; Rod Cameron; Marie Windsor; John Emery; Wallace Ford; Jack Lambert
- Cinematography: Jack Greenhalgh
- Edited by: Francis D. Lyon
- Music by: Dimitri Tiomkin
- Production company: Twentieth Century-Fox
- Distributed by: Twentieth Century-Fox
- Release dates: February 17, 1950 (Los Angeles); March 2, 1950 (New York)
- Running time: 88 minutes
- Country: United States
- Language: English

Dakota Lil is a 1950 American Cinecolor Western film directed by Lesley Selander and written by Maurice Geraghty. The film stars George Montgomery, Rod Cameron, Marie Windsor, John Emery, Wallace Ford and Jack Lambert. It was released on February 17, 1950, by Twentieth Century-Fox.

== Plot ==
Secret Service agent Tom Horn is dispatched to the West to apprehend a gang of counterfeiters. Horn begins his mission by gaining the trust of dancehall girl and saloon singer Dakota Lil, who is one of the gang's leaders. She leads Horn to Harve Logan, the mastermind of the operation. Logan is a violent psychopath who murders three individuals by strangling them with a riding strap. When Dakota Lil discovers Horn's true identity as a federal agent, she initially contemplates killing him but ultimately decides to assist him because of her romantic feelings for him.

== Cast ==
- George Montgomery as Tom Horn / Steve Garrett
- Rod Cameron as Harve Logan / Kid Curry
- Marie Windsor as Dakota Lil
- John Emery as Vincent
- Wallace Ford as Carter
- Jack Lambert as Dummy
- Larry Johns as Sheriff
- Marion Martin as Blonde Singer
- James Flavin as Secret Service Chief
- Walter Sande as Butch Cassidy
- Lillian Bronson as Sheriff's Wife
- Kenneth MacDonald as Fletch
- Clancy Cooper as Bartender
- Bill Perrott as Cashier
- Alberto Morin as Rurales Captain
- J. Farrell MacDonald as Ellis
- Anita Ellis as Dakota Lil's Singing Voice

== Reception ==
In a contemporary review for The New York Times, critic Bosley Crowther called Dakota Lil a "frank adventure film" and wrote: "[E]ven with Marie Windsor playing the temptatious role in an assortment of off-the-shoulder dresses and in a wickedly coquettish style, we're afraid that her powerful fascinations will not overwhelm the audience. As a matter of fact, we have good reason to suspect they will put folks to sleep. For the story is woefully hackneyed, the action is dismally routine and the actors, including Miss Windsor and George Montgomery, are downright grim. Furthermore, Cinecolor casts a pale and sickly hue over all. The best way to view this picture is as a juvenile indiscretion of all concerned."

Critic Edwin Schallert of the Los Angeles Times wrote: "'Dakota Lil' has a scenario treatment well above the average for a western. Just who is going to work in behalf of whom becomes an interesting problem in the picture. ... The picture ends badly with too many rescuers. It is likely to get an undesired laugh after going pretty well the rest of the way."

== Comic-book adaptation ==
- Fawcett: Dakota Lil (1949)
