= Joan O'Brien =

American actress and singer (1936–2025)

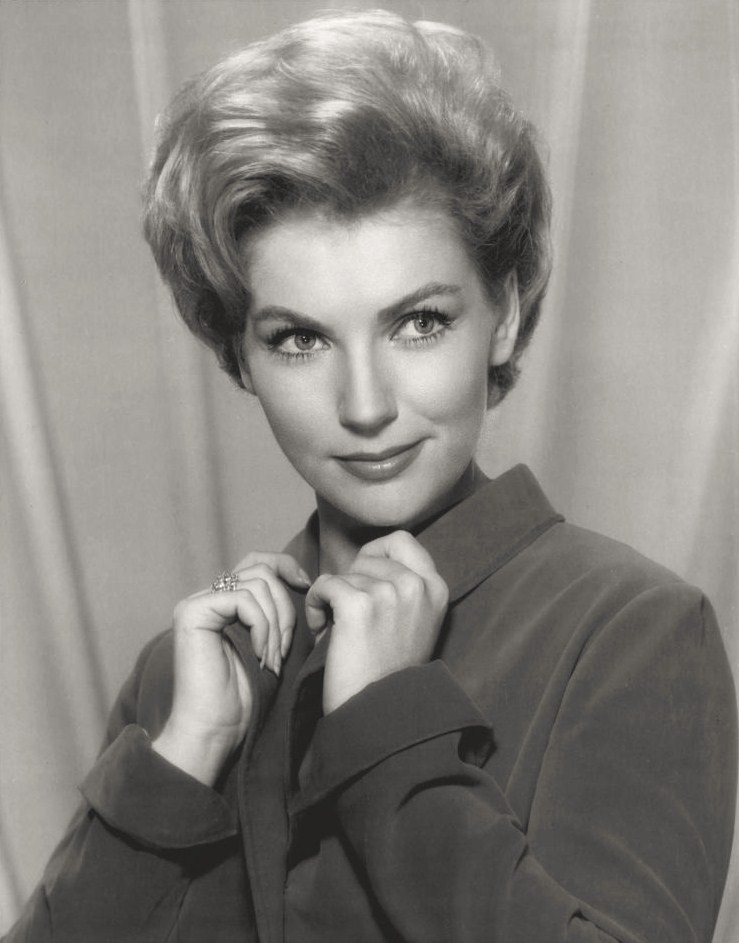
- O'Brien in a 1962 publicity photo
- Born: Joan Marie O'Brien; February 14, 1936; Cambridge, Massachusetts, U.S.
- Died: May 5, 2025 (aged 89); San Antonio, Texas, U.S.
- Occupations: Actress; singer
- Years active: 1949–1965
- Spouses: Billy Strange (m. 1954; div. 1956) John F. Meyers (m. 1957; div. 1960) Harvey Allen Godorov (m. 1963; div. 1964) Dino Kotopoulis (m. 1966; div. 1967) Malcolm Bernard Campbell (m. 1979; died 2004)
- Children: 2

Joan Marie O'Brien (February 14, 1936 – May 5, 2025) was an American actress and singer. She made a name for herself acting in television shows in the 1950s and 1960s and as a film co-star with Cary Grant, Elvis Presley, John Wayne, George Montgomery and Jerry Lewis.

== Background ==
Joan O'Brien was born to David and Rita O'Brien on Valentine's Day 1936, in Cambridge, Massachusetts. The family moved to California when O'Brien was a child and enrolled her in dance classes when she was eight years old. O'Brien graduated from Chaffey Union High School in Ontario, California.

O'Brien died following a battle with Alzheimer's disease on May 5, 2025, at the age of 89.

== Career ==
O'Brien's singing abilities came to the attention of entertainer and Country Music Hall of Fame member Cliffie Stone, who hired her as a regular performer on his television show Hometown Jamboree before her high school graduation. In 1954, she became a regular on The Bob Crosby Show and stayed until shortly before the show's cancellation in 1958. She co-starred with Cary Grant and Tony Curtis in the 1959 film Operation Petticoat.

Lawrence Welk hired O'Brien as a one-week replacement for his champagne lady Alice Lon in July 1959. O'Brien had come to Welk's attention years earlier as a singer on Bob Crosby's show but, at that time, Welk had decided not to hire her because she was still a teenager.

O’Brien performed in several episodes on the TV western Bat Masterson. The episode S2E01 "To the Manner Born" (1959) had her singing as up-and-coming opera soprano Dora Miller.

O'Brien was cast as survivor Susanna Dickinson in John Wayne's 1960 epic feature film retelling of battle of The Alamo. That same year, O'Brien performed as a soloist for composer Buddy Bregman at the Moulin Rouge night club in Los Angeles.

Her most frequent acting performances were in television during the 1960s. She made two guest appearances on Perry Mason: in 1960, she played Betty Roberts in "The Case of the Singing Skirt", and in 1965 she played Jill Fenwick in "The Case of the Lover's Gamble". In 1961, O'Brien again co-starred with John Wayne as his love interest in The Comancheros.

Along with Sheree North, Sabrina, and Sue Carson, O'Brien appeared in Playgirls in 1961 at the Riverside Hotel in Reno, Nevada.

O'Brien played Elvis Presley's girlfriend in the 1963 film It Happened at the World's Fair.

In 1964, O'Brien guest starred in an episode of The Man from UNCLE. Series star Robert Vaughn subsequently cast her as Ophelia in Hamlet at the Pasadena Playhouse.

After her acting career ended, O'Brien sang with the Harry James band in 1968.

== Television ==
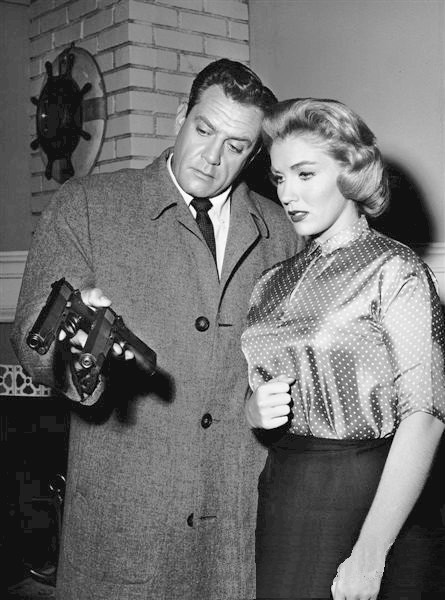
With Raymond Burr in Perry Mason, 1960

Television
Year	Title	Role	Notes
1949	Hometown Jamboree	Herself	as Joanie O'Brien
1954	The Bob Crosby Show	Herself	Regular performer
1955	The Easter Seal Teleparade of Stars	Herself	as Joanie O'Brien, singer
1957	Shower of Stars	Herself	as Joanie O'Brien
1958	M Squad	Marla Ross	The Take Over
1959	Riverboat	Sonja Torgin	The Fight Back
1959	Markham	Julia Conrad	We Are All Suspect
1959	Man Without a Gun	Ellen Duncan	Face of the Moon
1959	Bat Masterson	Dolores Clark	One Bullet from Broken Bow
1959	Bat Masterson	Dora Miller	Shakedown at St. Joe
1960	Bat Masterson	Eileen McDermott	High Card Loses
1960	Wagon Train	Candy O'Hara	The Candy O'Hara Story
1960	Cheyenne	Selma Dawson	Incident at Dawson Flats
1960	Wagon Train	Victoria	The Luke Grant Story
1960	The Westerner	Libby	The Courting of Libby
1960	The Islanders	Ann Brenner	The Terrified Blonde
1960	Lock-Up	Claudia Scott	Flying High
1960	The Deputy	Emily Price	Meet Sergeant Tasker
1960	The Chevy Mystery Show	Susan Hudson	Enough Rope
1960	Bronco	Judith Castle	La Rubia
1960	The Alaskans	Fay Campbell	Kangaroo Court
1960	Perry Mason	Betty Roberts	The Case of the Singing Skirt
1960–61	Bachelor Father	Janice McCleery	3 episodes
1961	Surfside 6	Linda Faris	Jonathan Wembley Is Missing
1961	The Roaring 20's	Mona Fenton	No Exit
1961	Whispering Smith	Marilyn Manning	The Idol
1961	Adventures in Paradise	Lila Simmons	Wild Mangoes
1961	Bringing Up Buddy	Ruth Grayson	The Singer
1961	G.E. True	Meryle	Tippy-Top
1962	Rawhide	Melinda Stimson	The Pitchwagon
1962	Bus Stop	Julie	The Ordeal of Kevin Brooke
1962	Follow the Sun	Nita Parker	Annie Beeler's Place
1962	The Tall Man	Marilee	The Impatient Brides
1962	Outlaws	Laurie	A Bit of Glory
1963	The Dick Van Dyke Show	Jane Leighton	The Foul Weather Girl
1964	The Man from U.N.C.L.E.	Chris Brinel	The Green Opal Affair
1964	The Virginian	Joan	The Dark Challenge
1964	The Lieutenant	Ruth	Man with an Edge
1965	Perry Mason	Jill Fenwick	The Case of the Lover's Gamble

== Films ==
Films
Year	Title	Role	Notes
1958	Handle with Care	Mary Judson	
1959	Operation Petticoat	Lt. Dolores Crandall RN	
1960	The Alamo	Susanna Dickinson	
1961	The Comancheros	Melinda Marshall	
1962	Six Black Horses	Kelly	
1962	Samar	Cecile Salazar	
1962	It's Only Money	Wanda Paxton	
1962	We Joined the Navy	Lt. Carol Blair	
1963	It Happened at the World's Fair	Diane Warren	
1964	Get Yourself a College Girl	Marge Endicott	
