= José Greco =

American dancer and choreographer

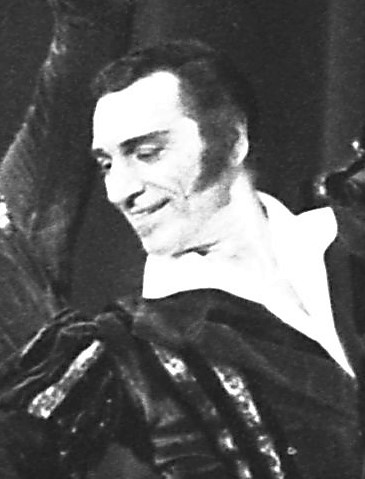
- Greco at Pasadena Civic Auditorium in 1975
- Born: Costanzo Greco; December 23, 1918; Montorio nei Frentani, Italy
- Died: December 31, 2000 (aged 82); Lancaster, Pennsylvania, U.S.
- Occupations: Dancer, actor, composer
- Years active: 1948–1990
- Known for: Flamenco dancer
- Spouse: Margaret Ana Borger-Greco (until 2000)
- Website: www.josegrecofoundation.org

José Greco (né Costanzo Greco; December 23, 1918 – December 31, 2000) was an Italian-born American flamenco dancer and choreographer known for popularizing Spanish dance on the stage and screen in America mostly in the 1950s and 1960s.

== Background ==
José Greco was born as Costanzo Greco in Montorio nei Frentani to Paolo Emilio and Maria Carmela (née Bucci) Greco. He would later legally change his name. When he was 10 years old, Greco and his family moved to New York City. He began dancing in Brooklyn with his sister Norina at a young age.

== Career ==
Greco made his professional dancing debut in 1937 at the Hippodrome Theatre in Manhattan. His most famous partners were La Argentinita (Encarnación López Júlvez) and, after her death, her sister Pilar López. In 1949, he formed the José Greco Dance Company, with which he toured extensively.

He also appeared in a number of films, including Sombrero (1953), Around the World in 80 Days (1956), Holiday for Lovers (1959), Ship of Fools (1965), and The Proud and the Damned (1972).

In 1951 Greco made his first appearance in the UK at the Sadler's Wells Theatre. Later in the decade in 1954 and again in 1957 his troupe collaborated with Alfredo Antonini and members of the New York Philharmonic while performing during open air concerts at Lewisohn Stadium in New York City.

Greco received many honors and awards including being knighted by the Spanish government (Cruz Laureada del Caballero del Mérito Civil) and receiving four honorary doctorates.

José Greco started the José Greco Foundation for Hispanic Dance in 1972 and retired from the stage for the first time in 1974. He published an autobiography, Gypsy in My Soul: The Autobiography of José Greco, in 1977. He had six children, three boys and three girls. His sons José Luis and Paolo are composers; his son José Greco II is a dancer as are his three daughters, Alessandra, Carmela and Lola.

He came out of retirement in the late 1980s to form a company featuring his children. He appeared on stage for the last time in 1995, at the age of 77. He was a Visiting professor of Dance at Franklin & Marshall College in Lancaster, Pennsylvania for the remainder of his life.

== Illness and death ==
During the fall of 2000, Greco developed a staph infection in his heart. As his condition worsened, he was hospitalized at the Lancaster Regional Medical Center in November. On December 17, Lancaster's Sunday News reported that Greco "was in terrible pain" because the "staph spread and formed a mass on his backbone." Well enough to be transferred from the hospital's intensive care unit to its skilled nursing facility later that month, he died from heart failure at his home in Lancaster at the age of 82 on December 31, 2000. His son, Jose Greco II, known as "Pepe" to his family and friends, traveled from his home in Texas to take over Greco's dance classes at Franklin & Marshall.

José Greco died of heart failure in his home in Lancaster, on the last day of the 20th century. In an obituary in the Los Angeles Times, dance critic Lewis Segal noted that Greco had been characterized as "the undisputed Spanish dance star of the '50s and '60s" and "the greatest of all dance stars until the advent of Rudolf Nureyev" in terms of box-office power.

== Filmography ==
=== Film ===
Year	Title	Role	Notes
1948	A Toast for Manolete	Rafael	
1953	Sombrero	Gitanillo de Torrano	
1956	Around the World in 80 Days	Flamenco Dancer	
1959	Holiday for Lovers	Himself – Dancer	
1965	Ship of Fools	Pepe	
1972	The Proud and Damned	Ramon	

=== Television ===
Year	Title	Role	Notes
1962	Walt Disney's Wonderful World of Color	Himself	Episode: "Von Drake in Spain"

== Sources ==
- History of José Greco
- José Luis Greco
