= Badman's Country =

1958 film

- Theatrical release poster
- Directed by: Fred F. Sears
- Screenplay by: Orville H. Hampton
- Produced by: Robert E. Kent
- Starring: George Montgomery
- Cinematography: Benjamin H. Kline
- Edited by: Grant Whytock
- Music by: Irving Gertz
- Color process: Black and white
- Production companies: Robert E. Kent Productions; Peerless Productions
- Distributed by: Warner Bros. Pictures
- Release date: August 2, 1958
- Running time: 68 minutes
- Country: United States
- Language: English

Badman's Country is a 1958 American Western film directed by Fred F. Sears and written by Orville H. Hampton. The film stars George Montgomery.

== Plot ==
Pat Garrett arrives in Abilene where he catches five of Butch Cassidy's gang. He calls in Wyatt Earp and Bat Masterson and they learn there is a half-million-dollar shipment of money arriving by train and Cassidy is amassing enough men to take it.

== Cast ==
- George Montgomery as Pat Garrett
- Neville Brand as Butch Cassidy
- Buster Crabbe as Wyatt Earp
- Karin Booth as Lorna
- Gregory Walcott as Bat Masterson
- Malcolm Atterbury as Buffalo Bill Cody
- Russell Johnson as Sundance
- Richard Devon as Harvey Logan
- Morris Ankrum as Mayor Coleman
- Dan Riss as Marshal McAfee
