= Robbers' Roost (1955 film) =

1955 film by Sidney Salkow

- Directed by: Sidney Salkow
- Screenplay by: John O'Dea; Sidney Salkow; Maurice Geraghty
- Story by: Zane Grey
- Produced by: Robert Goldstein
- Starring: George Montgomery; Richard Boone; Sylvia Findley; Bruce Bennett; Peter Graves; Tony Romano
- Cinematography: Jack Draper
- Edited by: George A. Gittens
- Music by: Paul Dunlap
- Production company: Goldstein-Jacks Productions
- Distributed by: United Artists
- Release date: May 30, 1955
- Running time: 83 minutes
- Country: United States
- Language: English

Robbers' Roost is a 1955 American Western film directed by Sidney Salkow and written by John O'Dea, Sidney Salkow and Maurice Geraghty. The film stars George Montgomery, Richard Boone, Sylvia Findley, Bruce Bennett, Peter Graves and Tony Romano. It is based on the 1932 novel Robbers' Roost by Zane Grey. The film was released on May 30, 1955, by United Artists. It was filmed in Durango, Mexico.

A previous adaptation of the story, also titled Robbers' Roost, was released by Fox in 1932 with George O'Brien and Maureen O'Sullivan.

== Plot ==
Suspecting them of being rustlers, cattle rancher Bull Herrick hires two feuding men, Hays and Heesman, as ranch hands to keep a close eye on both. The rancher's sister Helen arrives and wants Bull to return East with her, where doctors can treat the condition that has left him in a wheelchair.

A stranger in town, calling himself Tex, has joined up with the Hays group of ranch hands. Tex soon earns Bulls trust and is asked to protect Helen from unwanted suitors. Hays and Heesman join forces to gradually steal the cattle small amounts at a time. When Helen goes into town to find a buyer for the cattle, she spots a wanted poster at the train station showing Tex's true identity to be Jim Wall, a fugitive from a murder charge.

Hays double crosses Heesman, stealing the rest of the herd, and kidnaps Helen. Both Heesman's gang and the sheriff's posse start off in pursuit. Tex helps Helen escape, knocking her unconscious after she refuses to leave with him. On the run from Hays, she learns Tex had shot two men when Hays and his men stole his horses and killed his wife. Helen creates a rockslide, trapping Hays. A dying Hays confesses to the sheriff, clearing Tex of the murder charges.

== Cast ==
- George Montgomery as Jim 'Tex' Wall
- Richard Boone as Hank Hays
- Sylvia Findley as Helen Herrick
- Bruce Bennett as 'Bull' Herrick
- Peter Graves as Heesman
- Tony Romano as Happy Jack
- Warren Stevens as Smokey
- William Hopper as Robert Bell
- Stanley Clements as Chuck
- Leo Gordon as Jeff
