= Charter Pilot =

1940 film by Eugene Forde

- Theatrical poster
- Directed by: Eugene Forde
- Written by: J. Robert Bren (story); Norman Houston (story); Stanley Rauh (screenplay); Lester Ziffren(screenplay)
- Based on: story by George Hively
- Produced by: Sol M. Wurtzel
- Starring: Lynn Bari; Lloyd Nolan; Arleen Whelan; George Montgomery
- Cinematography: Lucien N. Andriot
- Edited by: Fred Allen
- Music by: Emil Newman
- Production company: Twentieth Century Fox Film Corporation
- Distributed by: Twentieth Century Fox Film Corporation
- Release date: December 6, 1940
- Running time: 70 minutes (Note: The film is also listed at 66 or 72 minutes long.)
- Country: United States
- Language: English

Charter Pilot is a 1940 drama film, directed by Eugene Forde and produced by Twentieth Century Fox Film Corporation. The film stars Lynn Bari, Lloyd Nolan, Arleen Whelan and George Montgomery. Charter Pilot depicts pilots flying cargo flights in the Honduras.

== Plot ==
King Morgan (Lloyd Nolan), chief pilot for W. J. Brady Charter Pilots, Inc., and his mechanic, Charlie Crane (George Montgomery) proves he can handle any type of weather in hauling cargo. King is also a famous pilot because his girl friend, Marge Duncan (Lynn Bari) has made him the daring hero of the radio show, named after him. After a long flight from Galveston to Los Angeles delivering soft-shell crabs, King sees Marge to propose marriage. Flustered by her taking time to get ready, he drinks too much and passes out. When he revives, he heads for the Mirrado nightclub where he causes an uproar and is arrested. Marge bails him out next day but when King finally proposes, Marge makes him promise to give up flying. King surprises his boss (Andrew Tombes) by asking for a desk job, working for accountant Horace Sturgeon (Hobart Cavanaugh). Charlie ends up as King's replacement, taking over a charter contract flying ore from a Honduras gold mine.

A competitor named Faber (Henry Victor) wants to get the lucrative gold mine charter contract and conspires to make Charlie look bad. The company looks likely to lose the contract from the gold mine and when Sturgeon is about to fire Charlie, King announces that he will go to Rico, Honduras and take over the charter flights. He convinces his fiancé that their honeymoon will be down south, but as soon as he can, flies to Rico alone. King discovers that their charter business is being sabotaged but has a plan to fly a more direct route over the high mountains using oxygen tanks.

Marge decides to take the radio show to where King is working, even though he no longer wants to be in the broadcast, and is angry with her for following him. After seeing King make a successful test flight in his modified cargo aircraft, Faber finds out that using oxygen will give the Brady Company an advantage. When King is in jail, after becoming drunk in a local cantina, Charlie is given the job of flying the ore, but Faber has damaged the oxygen supply so Charlie will pass out at altitude. Marge wants to have the first flight over the mountains on her radio show and hires Faber to fly her, but King joins them, having discovered the sabotage. When Faber pulls a gun on King, Marge reacts by knocking him out with her microphone.

With King now at the controls, he contacts Charlie and has him turn around. Faber revives and attacks King but Marge stabs Faber with a pin, giving King a chance to knock him out for good. Signing off from the radio show, King and Marge get back together.

== Cast ==
- Lynn Bari as Marge Duncan
- Lloyd Nolan as King Morgan
- Arleen Whelan as Raquel Andrews
- George Montgomery as Charlie Crane
- Hobart Cavanaugh as Horace Sturgeon
- Henry Victor as Faber
- Etta McDaniel as Ophie
- Andrew Tombes as [W. J.] Brady
- Charles Wilson as Owen
- Chick Chandler as Fred Adams
- Robert Spindola as Boy
- Sherry Hall as Steven
- Mary Field as Secretary

== Production ==
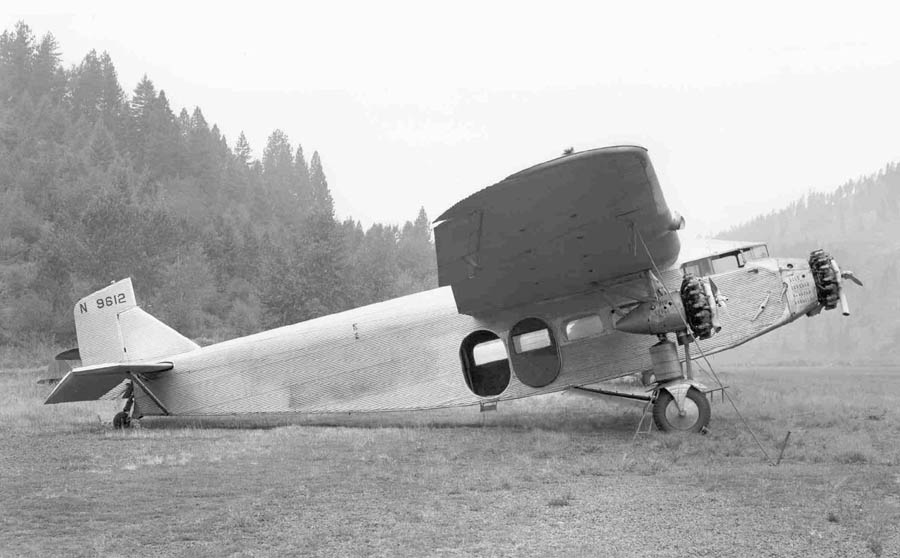
A Ford trimotor outfitted for cargo work, was featured in Charter Pilot.

Principal photography for Charter Pilot began in July 1940 at the Twentieth Century Fox studio and backlots, Los Angeles, California. After appearing in three Twentieth Century Fox films as a freelance actor, Charter Pilot was the first film that Lloyd Nolan made with the company after signing a studio contract. Established star Lynn Bari has her name appear over Nolan's in the title cards.

Only two flying scenes appeared in the film. Paul Mantz handled the flying duties, using his Ford Trimotor (NC7121). A barley field alongside the Santa Anita race track served as the airfield in the fictional Rico, Honduras.

== Reception ==
Charter Pilot, despite its length, was primarily a B film. Aviation Film Historian James H. Farmer characterized the film as "modest" with the only notable elements being the flying scenes. "The breathtaking aerobatic sequences were staged by Paul Mantz."
