= Robbers' Roost (1932 film) =

1932 film

- Theatrical release poster
- Directed by: David Howard; Louis King
- Screenplay by: Dudley Nichols
- Produced by: Sol Lesser
- Starring: George O'Brien; Maureen O'Sullivan
- Cinematography: George Schneiderman
- Production company: Fox Film Corporation
- Distributed by: Fox Film Corporation
- Release dates: December 30, 1932 (Premiere); January 1, 1933 (USA)
- Running time: 64 minutes
- Country: United States
- Language: English

Robbers' Roost is a 1932 American Pre-Code Western film directed by David Howard and Louis King and written by Dudley Nichols. The film stars George O'Brien and Maureen O'Sullivan. It is based on the 1932 novel Robbers' Roost by Zane Grey. The film premiered in September 13 to early November or December 30, 1932, and was released on January 1, 1933, by Fox Film Corporation.

The film was remade in 1955 under the same title, Robbers' Roost, with George Montgomery and Richard Boone.

== Cast ==
- George O'Brien as Jim Wall
- Maureen O'Sullivan as Helen Herrick
- Walter McGrail as Henchman Brad
- Maude Eburne as Aunt Ellen
- Reginald Owen as Cecil Herrick
- William Pawley as Hank Hays
- Clifford Santley as Happy Jack
- Robert Greig as Tulliver the Butler
