= The Proud and Damned =

1972 film

- Theatrical release poster
- Directed by: Ferde Grofé Jr.
- Written by: Ferde Grofé Jr.
- Produced by: Michael Du Pont (associate producer); Ferde Grofé Jr. (producer); George Montgomery (co-producer); Stanford Tischler (associate producer)
- Starring: Chuck Connors
- Cinematography: Remegio Young
- Edited by: Philip Innes
- Music by: Gene Kauer; Douglas M. Lackey
- Release date: 1972
- Running time: 92 minutes
- Countries: United States; Colombia
- Language: English

The Proud and Damned, also known as The Proud and the Damned, Proud and Damned, and Proud, Damned and Dead, is a 1972 American-Colombian co-production Western film written and directed by Ferde Grofé Jr. Shot in Colombia, the film starred Chuck Connors and Cesar Romero.

Some sources quote the title as "The Proud and the Damned", which is not the original name. The actual title, "The Proud and Damned", is clearly displayed in the title text of the original film version in the opening of the movie. Some images erroneously use the title "The Proud and the Damned".

== Plot ==
In 1870, ex-Confederate mercenaries and American Civil War veterans Sgt. Will Hansen (Chuck Connors), Ike (Aron Kincaid), Hank (Henry Caps), Jeb (Smokey Robards), and Billy (Peter Ford) have just emigrated from their home state of Texas to Colombia in South America. After their arrival, they are ambushed by Colombian soldiers who force them to come meet General Martinez, the evil, cold-hearted dictator of their country. Martinez sends them to San Carlos, a town where rebel forces are preparing to start a civil war against Martinez's army. The Texans are instructed to live among the rebels, and report back to Martinez what they know within the next couple of days. Martinez warns them that they will be severely punished if they fail him.

The next day, while on their way to San Carlos, Will's gang runs into a gypsy family who are on their way to the same town. Will escorts them to the town and takes an interest in the daughter, Mila. They all ride into San Carlos, meet the governor, and rent a cabin outside of town. Will and Mila sneak out to spend the night together. Mila's father is angry when he finds out and cuts off her ear. Will shoots Mila's father.

Will and his men are detained over the killing and find themselves unable to report back to Martinez. Will and Mila are banished from the town because the townspeople are angry over Will killing Mila's father. Will and Mila are captured by Martinez, who hangs Will for disobeying his orders. Mila rides back to town to get Will's friends, who give him a funeral, and vow to avenge his murder. They join the rebels in a battle with Martinez's army and drive them back. They later ambush Martinez and the rest of his surviving soldiers in a canyon, joined by the rebel army's captain. They manage to kill Martinez, but all are gunned down by his soldiers except for Billy, who was unconscious after falling from his horse. The film ends with Billy riding off into the sunset.

== Cast ==
- Chuck Connors as Will Hansen
- Aron Kincaid as Ike
- Cesar Romero as San Carlos' Mayor
- José Greco as Ramon (the gypsy)
- Smokey Roberds as Jeb
- Henry Capps as Hank
- Peter Ford as Billy
- Andres Marquis as Gen. Alehandro Martinez
- Conrad Parham as Capt. Juan Hernandez (the mayor's nephew)
- Maria Grimm as Maria Vargas
- Nana Lorca as Carmela (the dancer)
- Anita Quinn as Mila (Hansen's gypsy girlfriend)
- Álvaro Ruiz as Chico
- Fernando González Pacheco as Lieutenant
- Ignacio Gómez as Padre
- Ernesto Uribe as Aide
- Rey Vásquez as Innkeeper
- Bernardo Herrera as Rollo

== Production ==
With a working title of The Proud, Damned and Dead, the production was filmed in 1969 in Villa de Leyva, Colombia. The film was unusual for a Ferde Grofe production in that it was his first feature film production outside of the Philippines (not including the American International Pictures pictures High School Hellcats and Hot Rod Gang from which he had his name removed from their credits), and secondly that there was no pre-sale - the production was a huge financial gamble for him. George Montgomery is credited as a co-producer by virtue of putting up $125,000 for Chuck Connors' pay. Grofe was concerned about what he had heard of Connors' on-set reputation and insisted that Connors' payment be placed in escrow and payment only made upon satisfactory completion of the film. In addition to the film's main stars, three smaller roles were filled by actors who would later appear in The Day of the Wolves: Andres Marquis, Smokey Roberds and Henry Capps.

== Aftermath ==
Grofe was unable to distribute the film through his usual industry channels, and it would take another three years to sell the film to the Texan entity that eventually distributed the film. George Montgomery threatened to sue Grofe for the return of his funds once it became clear that there was no immediate film sale.

== See also ==
- List of American films of 1972
