= Bomb at 10:10 =

- Directed by: Caslav Damjanovic
- Starring: George Montgomery
- Cinematography: Nenad Jovicic
- Edited by: Milanka Nanovic
- Release date: 1967
- Running time: 88 minutes
- Country: Yugoslavia
- Language: English

Bomb at 10:10 is a 1967 Yugoslavian war film directed by Caslav Damjanovic and starring George Montgomery.

== Premise ==
An American P.O.W. works with Yugoslav partisans to assassinate an SS Colonel and concentration camp Commandant.

== Cast ==
- George Montgomery as Steve Corbett
- Rada Djuricin as Pia Fermich
- Branko Plesa as Col. Hassler
- Rade Markovic as Marko
- Phil Brown as Professor Pilic
- Ljuba Tadic as Andrey
- Aleksandar Gavric as Dragan
- Pavle Vujisic as Man with the glasses
- Ingrid Lotarius as Mira
- Petar Banicevic as Lt. Voss
- Dusan Tadic as Mile
- Radmilo Ćurčić as Train Conductor (uncredited)

== Production ==
The film was shot in Yugoslavia in 1966.
