= Warkill =

- Theatrical release poster
- Directed by: Ferde Grofé Jr.
- Written by: Ferde Grofé Jr.
- Produced by: Ferde Grofé Jr.
- Starring: George Montgomery; Tom Drake; Conrad Parham; Eddie Infante; Henry Duval; Joaquin Fajardo
- Cinematography: Remegio Young
- Edited by: Philip Innes
- Music by: Gene Kauer; Douglas M. Lackey
- Production company: Universal Pictures
- Distributed by: Universal Pictures
- Release date: May 1968
- Running time: 100 minutes
- Country: United States
- Language: English

Warkill is a 1968 American drama film written and directed by Ferde Grofé Jr. and starring George Montgomery, Tom Drake, Conrad Parham, Eddie Infante, Henry Duval and Joaquin Fajardo. It was released in May 1968, by Universal Pictures.

== Plot ==
As World War II nears its end, American correspondent Phil Sutton arrives in the Philippines to get first-hand information on U. S. Col. John Hannegan. Sutton has written several paperback books extolling Hannegan's heroic leadership of a small band of Filipino guerrillas who are routing the remnants of Japanese troops. Sutton quickly realizes, however, that his idol is a ruthless killer who never takes prisoners, preferring to flush out the enemy and then shoot them. Sutton's revulsion at Hannegan's methods is somewhat mollified when they come across a native village where the inhabitants have been slaughtered by a fanatical Japanese officer intent upon destroying the local hospital. When the hospital's medical officer and personnel refuse to vacate their post, Hannegan reluctantly leaves some of his men behind while he takes to the hills to harass the enemy until reinforcements arrive. Sutton offers to join Hannegan and is granted permission. After delaying the attack on the hospital by hit-and-run tactics, Sutton and Hannegan return in time to help repulse the onslaught, but Hannegan is killed just before the reinforcements arrive. In spite of Hannegan's questionable methods, Sutton realizes that he will be remembered as a hero and decides to keep secret what he has learned.

== Cast ==
- George Montgomery as Col. John Hannegan
- Tom Drake as Phil Sutton
- Conrad Parham as Pedrini
- Eddie Infante as Dr. Fernandez
- Henry Duval as Willy
- Joaquin Fajardo as Max
- Paul Edwards Jr. as Mike Harris
- Claude Wilson as U.S. Major
- Bert La Fortesa as Dr. Namura
- Bruno Punzalan as Maj. Hashiri
- David Michael as Sgt. Johnson

== Production ==
In 1966 Montgomery announced he would make two films with Ferde Goff, Warkill and Ride the Tiger. The film was meant to be the first of 12 movies from Balut Productions, all directed by Goff; others were meant to include The Day of the Wolves and Ride the Tiger, also with Montgomery.
