= Guerillas in Pink Lace =

- Directed by: George Montgomery
- Written by: Ferde Grofé Jr; George Montgomery
- Produced by: George Montgomery
- Starring: George Montgomery
- Cinematography: Emmanuel I. Rojas
- Edited by: Kenneth Crane
- Music by: Gene Kauer
- Production company: Mont Productions
- Release date: 1964
- Running time: 96 minutes
- Country: Philippines
- Language: English/Japanese

Guerillas in Pink Lace is a 1964 Philippine Techniscope comedy set during the invasion of the Philippines during World War II. The film starred George Montgomery who also produced, directed and co-wrote the screenplay as well as featuring his own father in a role as a Priest.

== Plot ==
American expatriate gambler Murphy's luck is running from bad to worse. Twenty seven days after the attack on Pearl Harbor Murphy has lost his fortune in a high-stakes poker game, is beaten up by some of his many creditors and is trapped in the Philippines during the Japanese invasion. He is comforted by an elderly priest Fr Osgood who laments the fact that he has a pass to ride on a United States Army Air Forces DC-3 evacuating American civilians to Australia when he would rather minister to the troubled souls who will be left behind to face the Japanese. Murphy supports the priest in his decision by allowing the priest to give him his pass so Murphy can escape to Australia. He gleefully dons a pair of spectacles and a cassock to impersonate the 74-year-old priest.

At the same hotel as Murphy and the priest are a troupe of exotic dancers who have scored similar passes due to one of them having sexual relations with a US Army Lieutenant Colonel who had the power to issue the passes. Facing the wrath of the many Americans unable to leave, they decide to avoid hostility by travelling with Murphy, thinking he is an actual priest; despite the fact that he never wears his cassock correctly and carries a M1911A1 .45 calibre pistol in a shoulder holster.

Murphy's bad luck returns when their plane is shot down by the Japanese. With the survivors separating during the night, Murphy awakes to find himself on a life raft with the five dancers. They come ashore on one of the many small Philippine islands. Murphy soon discovers a Japanese radio station but his reconnaissance leads him to believe that the post is only manned by two idiots. The party's luck changes when Murphy finds a suitable hiding place, a large supply of fresh fruit and water with Murphy able to enter the Japanese outpost to steal food and make a distress call to the US Navy. Their luck turns to bad again when Murphy finds a large company of Japanese troops. When they are discovered, Murphy and the girls decide to give the Japanese a party they will never forget with the dynamite they discover in a supply building.

== Cast ==
- George Montgomery as Murphy aka Father Osgood
- Joan Shawlee as Miss Gloria Maxine
- Valerie Varda as Lori
- Jane Earl as Jane
- Ruth Earl as Marguerite
- Robin Grace as Josie
- Diki Lerner as a Japanese Private First Class
- Joe Sison as a Japanese Superior Private
- Ken Loring as a gambler
- Jack Lewis as Lt. Col Lewis
- Jim Montgomery as Father Osgood

== See also ==
- Operation Petticoat
- Father Goose
