= Strangers at Sunrise =

- Directed by: Percival Rubens
- Screenplay by: Lee Marcus; Percival Rubens
- Produced by: Alan Girney; Thys Heyns; Felix Meyburgh
- Starring: George Montgomery; Deana Martin; Brian O'Shaughnessy
- Cinematography: Lionel Friedberg
- Edited by: Basil Millward
- Music by: Colin Campbell
- Production company: Panorama Films
- Distributed by: Commonwealth United Entertainment
- Release date: 7 August 1969 (South Africa)
- Running time: 99 minutes
- Country: South Africa
- Language: English

Strangers at Sunrise is a 1969 South African-American film starring George Montgomery and directed by Percival Rubens.

== Plot ==
During the Second Boer War in 1900, an American mining engineer is sentenced to death by the British for aiding and abetting the Boer enemy. The engineer escapes from custody and takes refuge at an isolated Boer farm, where he forms a relationship with the Boer family. When three deserters from the British army arrive, the engineer must protect himself and the family.

== Cast ==
- George Montgomery as Grant Merrick
- Deana Martin as Julie Beyers
- Brian O'Shaughnessy as Corporal Caine

== Production ==
Filming for Strangers at Sunset began in Johannesburg, South Africa in September 1968. Deana Martin was confirmed as starring in the film. During filming the stuntman for George Montgomery broke his arm while filming a scene jumping from a roof, making it necessary for a new stuntman to be provided.

Martin filmed a nude scene for Strangers at Sunrise, which received some controversy. Reuters claimed that it was the first nude scene to be filmed for theatrical release in South Africa and noted that stills of the scene were published in the news prior to censor review. The scene was later excised by censors and criticized by the Dutch Reformed Church, who petitioned for South Africa to further strengthen their obscenity laws.

== Release ==
Strangers at Sunrise was first released in 1969.

== Reception and themes ==
Leonard Maltin described the film as a "turn-of-the-century South African Western with American mining engineer, attracted by the gold rush".

Critical perspectives on the Western : from A fistful of dollars to Django unchained found that the film "typically focused on the early settler colonization of southern Africa." and that this "South African—US coproduction [...] is semantically set during the Anglo-Boer War in the Transvaal around 1900. But at a syntactic level the film is very clearly modeled on Shane (George Stevens, 1953)."
