= Last of the Badmen =

1957 film by Paul Landres

- Directed by: Paul Landres
- Screenplay by: Daniel B. Ullman; David Chantler
- Produced by: Vincent M. Fennelly
- Starring: George Montgomery
- Cinematography: Ellsworth Fredericks
- Edited by: William Austin
- Music by: Paul Sawtell
- Production company: Allied Artists Pictures
- Distributed by: Allied Artists Pictures
- Release date: February 17, 1957
- Running time: 79 minutes
- Country: United States
- Language: English

Last of the Badmen is a 1957 American CinemaScope Western film directed by Paul Landres and starring George Montgomery.Last of the Badmen opened in Chicago on April 17, 1957 at the Roosevelt Theater (State and Washington, around 1,500 seats) as part of a double bill with The Incredible Shrinking Man (1957)

== Cast ==
- George Montgomery as Dan Barton
- James Best as Ted Hamilton
- Douglas Kennedy as Hawkins
- Keith Larsen as Roberts
- Robert Foulk as Tom Taylor
- Willis Bouchey as Marshal Parker
- John Doucette as Johnson
- Meg Randall as Lila
- Tom Greenway as Dallas
- Addison Richards as Dillon
- Michael Ansara as Jess Kramer
- John Damler as Elkins

== Production ==
The film was known as 54 Washington Street. Filming started June 1956.
