= Django the Condemned =

1965 film

- Directed by: Maury Dexter
- Written by: Eduardo Manzanos
- Produced by: Eduardo Manzanos; Arturo Marcos
- Starring: George Montgomery; Elisa Montés; José Nieto; Jesús Tordesillas; Frank Braña; Miguel del Castillo; Ana Maria Custodio; Rafael Hernandez; Ricardo Valle; Antonio Orengo; Luis Montez
- Cinematography: Robert Richardson
- Edited by: Luis Alvarez (assistant editor)
- Production company: Fénix Cooperativa Cinematográfica
- Distributed by: National Telefilm Associates (NTA) (1965) (USA) (TV) (dubbed); D.C. Films (Spain) (all media); Itálica Films S.A. (Spain) (all media); Itálica Films (Spain) (all media); New Gold Entertainment (1965) (Italy) (all media)
- Release dates: 23 December 1965 (Italy, Spain); 18 January 1966 (U.S.)
- Running time: 98 minutes
- Country: Spain
- Language: English

Django the Condemned (aka Django the Honorable Killer or Outlaw of Red River) is a 1965 English-speaking Spanish Western movie starring George Montgomery and directed by Maury Dexter.

== Storyline ==
Pat O'Brien (aka Django or Ray Reese) is an outlaw from Texas who's accused of killing his wife, who now, as a fugitive from justice residing in Mexico, finds himself as an officer in the Mexican army, an underling under General Miguel Camargo (José Nieto), also a known bandit, and his job is to protect the General's property from Espada (Miguel del Castillo) and his bandit gang. Django is accused of killing the nephew of a wealthy land owner named Don Cristibal Riaño (Jesús Tordesillas), an emperor Maximiliano's supporter, and when Camargo begins to show interest in Francesca Riaño (Elisa Montés), a young widow living in Riano's house, he also finds himself accused of the murder.

After extensive inquiries, O'Brien, or Django, manages to piece together the story of the nephew's death, and discovers that Riano himself is the culprit. Espada's bandit gang strikes again, as Django succeeds in killing most of them in his defense of the General's property.

Finally, Django ends up with Francesca, with whom he's fallen in love, as Camargo is left to look after himself.

== Cast ==
- George Montgomery as Ray Reese/Pat O'Brien / Django
- Elisa Montés as Francisca Riaño
- José Nieto as General Miguel Camargo
- Jesús Tordesillas as Don Cristobal Riaño
- Miguel del Castillo as Espada
- Ana Maria Custodio s Senora Camargo
- Gloria Cámara as Marta Camargo
- Ricardo Valle as Alfredo Riaño
- José Villasante as Camargo stableman
- Carmen Porcel as Riaño's housekeeper
- Frank Braña as Paco
- Rafael Vaquero as Espada bandit
- Rafael Hernandez (as Ralph Baldwyn) as Father of slain girl
- Antonio Orengo as Lopez, Riaño stableman
- Juanito Ramirez as Villager
- Luis Montez as Rafael Ibáñez
- Luis Martinez Carvaja as Victor Bayo

== Production ==
The film was originally called Outlaw of Red River. It was a co production between Robert L. Lippert's company and a Spanish company - Lippert provided above the line costs and the key creatives, the Spanish provided below the line costs. George Montgomery agreed to star. Lippert insisted his mistress, Margia Dean, be cast, but Maury Dexter refused.

Ken Annakin was filming Battle of the Bulge in Spain at the same time and cast Montgomery in that film once he heard he would be in the country.
