= The Sword of Monte Cristo =

1951 film by Maurice Geraghty

- Theatrical release poster
- Directed by: Maurice Geraghty
- Written by: Maurice Geraghty
- Based on: The Count of Monte Cristo by Alexandre Dumas
- Produced by: Edward L. Alperson
- Starring: George Montgomery; Rita Corday; Berry Kroeger; William Conrad; Rhys Williams; Steve Brodie
- Cinematography: Jack Greenhalgh
- Edited by: Francis D. Lyon
- Music by: Raoul Kraushaar
- Production company: Edward L. Alperson Productions
- Distributed by: Twentieth Century-Fox
- Release dates: April 4, 1951 (Los Angeles); April 22, 1951 (New York)
- Running time: 80 minutes
- Country: United States
- Language: English

The Sword of Monte Cristo is a 1951 American historical adventure film written and directed by Maurice Geraghty and starring George Montgomery, Rita Corday, Berry Kroeger, William Conrad, Rhys Williams and Steve Brodie. It is loosely based on the 1844 novel The Count of Monte Cristo by Alexandre Dumas. The film was released on March 3, 1951 by Twentieth Century-Fox.

== Plot ==
In 1858 France, emperor Louis Napoleon sends Captain Renault of the Royal Dragoons, Minister La Roche and Major Nicolet to Normandy in search of the members of a group of rebels. Lady Christianne, niece of the Marquis de Montableau, announces at a secret meeting of the Normandy underground leaders that the fabled treasure of Monte Cristo was willed to her and that she will use it to finance their cause. Her uncle, the only one who can decipher the symbols on the sword of Monte Cristo, the key to the treasure, derides her stand against the emperor. La Roche takes possession of the sword and banishes the Marquis to the dungeon. While masked, Christianne regains the sword from La Roche, but Captain Renault apprehends her and returns to sword to La Roche, the key to locating the treasure. La Roche has him removed and placed under guard, but he escapes and Christianne tries to stop him.

== Cast ==
- George Montgomery as Captain Renault
- Rita Corday as Lady Christianne (billed as Paula Corday)
- Berry Kroeger as Minister Charles La Roche
- William Conrad as Major Nicolet
- Rhys Williams as Mayor of Varonne
- Steve Brodie as Sergeant
- Robert Warwick as Marquis de Montableau
- David Bond as Emperor Napoleon III
- Lillian Bronson as Pepite
- Acquanetta as Felice
- Trevor Bardette as Navarre
- Crane Whitley as Hansmann
- Leonard Mudie as Court Physician
- John Davidson as Artist
- George Baxter as Mocquard
- Steve Darrell as Courdelay
- Kenneth MacDonald as Chamberlain
- Henry Corden as Bouchard
- Michael Vallon as Viard
- Stuart Holmes as Chatelain

== Reception ==
In a contemporary review for The New York Times, critic Howard Thompson called the film "singularly dull-edged" and wrote: "Call it what you will, the color process is almost garish enough to keep a spectator awake. Not quite, though, for Maurice Geraghty has whacked out a kindergarten script that is not only humorless but stiflingly pedantic. The principals do their cardboard best, but Mr. Geraghty, again, has directed the picture as though he had more faith in the horses. Only Robert Warwick, as the uncle, manages to dignify his role with a semblance of conviction, the only shred in this latest, silliest and dullest Hopalong Cristo."
