= Samar (1962 film) =

1962 film by George Montgomery

- Directed by: George Montgomery
- Written by: George Montgomery; Ferde Grofé Jr.
- Produced by: George Montgomery; Ferde Grofé Jr.
- Starring: George Montgomery; Gilbert Roland; Ziva Rodann; Joan O'Brien; Nico Minardos
- Cinematography: Emmanuel I. Rojas
- Edited by: Walter Thompson
- Music by: Harry Zimmerman
- Distributed by: Warner Bros. Pictures
- Release date: 1962
- Countries: United States; Philippines
- Language: English

Samar is a 1962 film. Co-written, directed, produced by and stars George Montgomery. It also starred Gilbert Roland, Ziva Rodann, Joan O'Brien, and Nico Minardos.

== Plot ==
Spain rules the Philippines with an iron hand in the 1870s and uses the island of Samar as a penal colony for unwanted political prisoners.

An American doctor and adventurer makes himself unpopular, and is offered the post of doctor on the island, which he accepts, the alternative proposal being more unpleasant.

The colony is in a state of unrest, and decide to brave the jungle, which is full of savage head-hunters, in a bid for freedom from their Spanish oppressors.

== Cast ==
- George Montgomery as Dr. John David Saunders
- Gilbert Roland as Col. Juan Sebastian Salazar
- Ziva Rodann as Ana Orteiz
- Joan O'Brien as Cecile Salazar
- Nico Minardos as Capt. De Guzman
- Mario Barri as Sgt. Nanding
- Henry Feist as Tominsino
- Tony Fortich as Trustee
- Johnny Cortez as Adring
- Carmen Austin as School Teacher
- Esperanza Garcia as Injured Woman
- Danilo Jurado as Trustee (as Danny Jurado)
- Luciano Lasam as Trustee
- Pedro Faustino as Lasar
- Joaquin Fajardo as Spanish Soldier
- Pamela Saunders as Woman Convict (as Pam Saunders)
- Rita Moreno as Woman Convict
