= Law of the Plains =

1938 film by Sam Nelson

- Theatrical release poster
- Directed by: Sam Nelson
- Written by: Maurice Geraghty
- Produced by: Harry L. Decker
- Starring: Charles Starrett; Iris Meredith
- Cinematography: Benjamin Kline
- Edited by: Gene Havlick
- Music by: M. W. Stoloff
- Production company: Columbia Pictures
- Release date: May 12, 1938 (US)
- Running time: 56 minutes
- Country: United States
- Language: English

Law of the Plains is a 1938 American Western film directed by Sam Nelson, starring Charles Starrett, and Iris Meredith.

== Cast ==
- Charles Starrett as Chuck Saunders
- Iris Meredith as Marion
- Bob Nolan as Bob
- Robert Warwick as Willard McGowan
- Dick Curtis as Jim Fletcher
- Edward LeSaint as William Norton
- Edmund Cobb as Slagle
- Art Mix as Grant
- Jack Rockwell as Marshal
- George Chesebro as Bartender
- Sons of the Pioneers
