= Street of Sinners =

1957 film by William A. Berke

- theatrical release poster
- Directed by: William Berke
- Screenplay by: John McPartland
- Story by: Philip Yordan
- Produced by: William Berke
- Starring: George Montgomery; Geraldine Brooks; Nehemiah Persoff; Marilee Earle; William Harrigan; Stephen Joyce
- Cinematography: J. Burgi Contner
- Edited by: Everett Sutherland
- Music by: Albert Glasser
- Production company: Security Pictures
- Distributed by: United Artists
- Release date: September 1957
- Running time: 80 minutes
- Country: United States
- Language: English

Street of Sinners is a 1957 American crime film directed by William Berke, written by John McPartland, and starring George Montgomery, Geraldine Brooks, Nehemiah Persoff, Marilee Earle, William Harrigan and Stephen Joyce. It was released in September 1957 by United Artists.

== Plot ==
Rookie Officer Johnny Dean is being orientated by retiring officer Gus. He is introduced to a depressed Larry. He is soon on the job issuing a parking ticket to the Tommy, street mafia Leon's brother.

Later, he encounters a drunk Teri who tries to undress. He hears screaming and finds out Larry has committed suicide. Nancy, Tommys girlfriend tells Leon to get her a modelling job with his connections like he did for Joan but Leon refuses.

Officer Johnny humiliates Leon by booking him. As he patrols some young men assault him. Teri helps him clean up and she invites him to dinner. Teri is drunk at their dinner date and climbs out the window crying. Johnny tries to bring her back in the apartment but she slips and falls . He is suspended.

Meanwhile he discovers Larry committed suicide after finding out Joan is “ working downtown". Johnny persuades Joan's friend Francis to testify against Leon. Leon hires Ricky to get rid of Francis. Nancy sees Ricky and Francis leaving together and tells Johnny who tries to have Ricky arrested at the station. An eye witness tells Nancy he saw Ricky go into a garage with a girl and but came out alone. Johnny goes into the garage looking for Francis' body but Leon convinces everyone Johnny is crazy. Later Johnny continues looking and finds a drain hidden under a convertible. Leon arrives and shoots Johnny who falls into the drain but hangs on to the edge. Leon is then shot by Gus. Johnny and Gus walk out of the garage together.

== Cast ==
- George Montgomery as John Dean
- Geraldine Brooks as Terry
- Nehemiah Persoff as Leon
- Marilee Earle as Nancy
- William Harrigan as Gus
- Stephen Joyce as Ricky
- Clifford David as Tom
- Diana Millay as Joan
- Andra Martin as Frances
- Danny Dennis as Short Stuff
- Ted Erwin as sergeant #1
- Melvin Decker as Tiny
- Lou Gilbert as Sam
- Barry McGuire as Larry
- Elia Clark as Boy
- William Kerwin as Tom
- Jack Hartley as fire captain
- Billy James as Joey
- Liza Balesca as Sam's wife
- Eva Gerson as Tiny's mother
- John Holland as Harry
- Bob Duffy as motor cop
- Joey Faye as Pete
- Fred Herrick as sergeant #2
- Charlie Jordan as customer
- John Barry as utility bartender
- Wolfe Barzell as Tiny's father
- Stephen Elliott
