= Warren Stevens =

American actor (1919–2012)

- Stevens in 1963
- Born: Warren Albert Stevens; November 2, 1919; Clarks Summit, Pennsylvania, U.S.
- Died: March 27, 2012 (aged 92); Sherman Oaks, California, U.S.
- Education: The Actors Studio
- Occupation: Actor
- Years active: 1947–2007
- Spouse(s): Susan Tucker Huntington (m. 1942; div. 1949) Barbara French (m. 1969)
- Children: 3

Warren Albert Stevens (November 2, 1919 – March 27, 2012) was an American stage, screen, and television actor.

== Early life and career ==
Stevens was born in Clarks Summit, Pennsylvania and graduated from Clarks Summit High School. He attended the Naval Academy Preparatory School and entered the United States Naval Academy in 1937 but was medically discharged in 1940. In January 1942, he enlisted in the United States Army Air Forces and became an aviation cadet. During World War II, he served in the Army Air Forces as a pilot.

A founding member of the Actors Studio in New York, Stevens received notice on Broadway in the late 1940s, and thereafter was offered a Hollywood contract at 20th Century Fox. His first Broadway role was in The Life of Galileo (1947) and his first movie role followed in The Frogmen (1951). As a young studio contract player, Stevens had little choice of material, and he appeared in films that included Phone Call from a Stranger (1952), Wait Till the Sun Shines, Nellie (1952), and Gorilla at Large (1954). A memorable movie role was that of the ill-fated "Doc" Ostrow in the science fiction film Forbidden Planet (1956). He also had supporting roles in The Barefoot Contessa (1954) with Humphrey Bogart and Intent to Kill (1958).

Despite occasional parts in big films, Stevens was unable to break out consistently into A-list movies, so he carved out a career in television as a journeyman dramatic actor.

== Television career ==
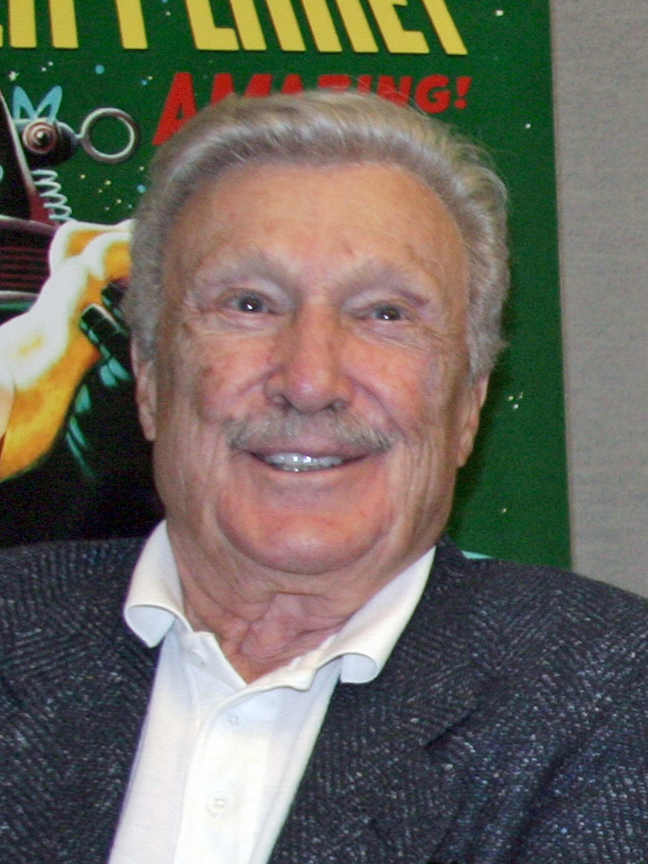
Stevens at the 2006 San Diego Comic Con

He co-starred as Lieutenant William Storm in Tales of the 77th Bengal Lancers (NBC, 1956–1957), a prime time adventure series set in India. Stevens also provided the voice of John Bracken in season one of Bracken's World (NBC, 1968–1970). He played the role of Elliot Carson in the daytime series Return to Peyton Place during its two-year run (1972–1974).

He appeared in over 150 prime time shows from the 1950s to the early 1980s, including:

- Golden Age anthology series (Actors Studio, Campbell Playhouse, The Web, Justice, The Philco Television Playhouse, Studio One, The United States Steel Hour, Bob Hope Presents the Chrysler Theatre, Route 66),
- Mysteries Hawaiian Eye (4 episodes), Adam-12 (1 episode), Perry Mason, The Untouchables, Climax!, Checkmate (2 episodes), Surfside 6 (2 episodes), 77 Sunset Strip (2 episodes), Behind Closed Doors, I Spy, The Man from U.N.C.L.E., Ironside (3 episodes), The Mod Squad, Mannix, Cannon (3 episodes), Griff, Mission: Impossible (4 episodes), Combat! (1 episode).
- Horror and Sci Fi Inner Sanctum (3 episodes), Alfred Hitchcock Presents (2 episodes), The Twilight Zone (episode "Dead Man's Shoes"), One Step Beyond (episode "The Riddle"), The Outer Limits (episode "Keeper of the Purple Twilight"), Star Trek (episode "By Any Other Name"), Voyage to the Bottom of the Sea (3 episodes), The Time Tunnel, Science Fiction Theater, Land of the Giants (2 episodes)
- Comedies The Donna Reed Show (2 episodes, 1965 and 1966), M*A*S*H (1 episode, Season 4, episode 13, "The Gun", Dec 2, 1975)
- Westerns (Laramie, The Rebel, A Man Called Shenandoah), Wagon Train (2 episodes), The Alaskans, Tales of Wells Fargo (1 episode), Gunsmoke (3 episodes), Bonanza (4 episodes), Daniel Boone (3 episodes), The Virginian (3 episodes), The Big Valley (one episode), Rawhide, and Have Gun, Will Travel (3 episodes). Tombstone Territory (1 episode), Stoney Burke (1 episode). In 1970 he appeared as Paul Carson on The Men From Shiloh (rebranded name for The Virginian) in the episode titled "Hannah."

Stevens' appearance in the 1955 movie Robbers' Roost introduced him to Richard Boone, who hired him for a continuing television role on The Richard Boone Show, an award-winning NBC anthology series which lasted for the 1963–1964 season.

Stevens was a close friend of actor Richard Basehart and helped him through a difficult divorce in the early 1960s. Stevens guest-starred in a few episodes of Basehart's ABC series, Voyage to the Bottom of the Sea. He also had a supporting role on another Irwin Allen production, The Return of Captain Nemo in 1978.

In his later years, Stevens' appearances were infrequent. He guest-starred in ER in March 2006 and had two roles in 2007.

For the DVD release of Combat! he provided audio commentary for "The Gun" (S5, E1) an episode in which he had guest-starred. He also guest-starred in "The Imposter" (S3, E10).

== Death ==
Stevens died on March 27, 2012, from complications of lung disease in his home in Sherman Oaks, Los Angeles, California. He had three children.

== Filmography ==
=== Film ===
Year	Title	Role	Notes
1951	Follow the Sun	Radio Announcer	Uncredited
1951	The Frogmen	Hodges	
1951	Mr. Belvedere Rings the Bell	Reporter	
1952	Phone Call from a Stranger	Marty Nelson	
1952	Red Skies of Montana	Steve Burgess	
1952	Deadline – U.S.A.	George Burrows	
1952	Wait till the Sun Shines, Nellie	McCauley	Uncredited
1952	O. Henry's Full House	Druggist	(segment "The Last Leaf"), Uncredited
1952	Something for the Birds	Beer Commercial Announcer	Voice, Uncredited
1953	The I Don't Care Girl	Lawrence	
1953	Shark River	Clay Webley	
1954	Gorilla at Large	Joe, Detective	
1954	The Barefoot Contessa	Kirk Edwards	
1954	Black Tuesday	Joey Stewart	
1955	Women's Prison	Glen Burton	
1955	The Man from Bitter Ridge	Linc Jackman	
1955	Robbers' Roost	Smokey	
1955	Duel on the Mississippi	Hugo Marat	
1956	The Price of Fear	Frankie Edare	
1956	Forbidden Planet	Lieutenant 'Doc' Ostrow	
1956	On the Threshold of Space	Captain Mike Bentley	
1956	Accused of Murder	Stan 'Scarface' Wilbo	
1958	Man or Gun	Mike Ferris	
1958	Hot Spell	Wyatt Mitchell - Virginia's Boyfriend	
1958	The Case Against Brooklyn	Rudi Franklin	
1958	Intent to Kill	Finch	
1959	No Name on the Bullet	Lou Fraden	
1962	Stagecoach to Dancers' Rock	Jess Dollard	
1962	40 Pounds of Trouble	Swing	
1966	Madame X	Michael Spalding	
1966	Gunpoint	Nate Harlan	
1966	An American Dream	Johnny Dell	
1966	Cyborg 2087	Dr. Carl Zellar	
1968	Madigan	Captain Ben Williams	
1968	The Sweet Ride	Brady Caswell	
1976	The Student Body	Dr. Blalock	
1980	High Ice	Sergeant Lomax	Television film
1983	Stroker Ace	Jim Catty	
1991	Samurai Cop	Film Lab Owner	
2007	Carts	Fred Tait	(final film role)

=== Television ===
Year	Title	Role	Notes
1950	Robert Montgomery Presents		"The Champion"
1950-1953	The Philco-Goodyear Television Playhouse	Various roles	4 episodes
1953	Suspense	Bernard Frank	"Mr. Matches"
1953-1554	Studio One	Various roles	2 episodes
1954	The United States Steel Hour	Paul Dane	"The End of Paul Dane"
1955	Medic	Dr. Robert Alan Parker	"Breath of Life"
1955-1956	Alfred Hitchcock Presents	Various roles	Season 1 Episode 2 "Premonition" as Perry Stanger (1955) Season 1 Episode 30 "Never Again" as Jeff Simmons (1956)
1956	Four Star Playhouse	Dan	"Dark Meeting"
1956-1957	Tales of the 77th Bengal Lancers	Lieutenant William Storm	26 episodes
1957	Climax!	Various roles	2 episodes
1957-1963	Gunsmoke	Various roles	3 episodes
1957-1963	Have Gun-Will Travel	Various roles	3 episodes
1958	Perry Mason	Alan Neil	"The Case of the Empty Tin"
1959-1962	Wagon Train	Various roles	2 episodes
1959	Tales of Wells Fargo	Clay Allison	"Clay Allison"
1959	Men Into Space	Dr. Randolph	"Quarantine"
1960-1962	Hawaiian Eye	Various roles	4 episodes
1961	The Untouchables	Alex Brosak	"90-Proof Dame"
1962	The Twilight Zone	Nathan 'Nate' Bledsoe	"Dead Man's Shoes"
1963-1964	The Richard Boone Show	Various roles	25 episodes
1964	The Outer Limits	Eric Plummer	"Keeper of the Purple Twilight"
1964	Combat!	Sergeant Walter	"The Impostor"
1965	Rawhide	Talbot	"Clash at Broken Bluff"
1965	Bonanza	Paul Mandel	"The Ballerina"
1965	The Man from U.N.C.L.E.	Captain Dennis Jenks	"The Children's Day Affair"
1965	Kraft Suspense Theatre	Mark Wilton	"The Trains of Silence"
1966	The Rat Patrol	Sergeant Frank Griffin	"The Do or Die Raid"
1966	Death Valley Days	Doc Holiday	"Doc Holidays Gold Bars"
1966	The Time Tunnel	Dr. Harlow	"One Way To The Moon"
1966	The Big Valley	Bert Jason	"Tunnel of Gold"
1966	Combat!	Sergeant Higgin	"The Gun"
1966	Voyage to the Bottom of the Sea	Sam Garrity	"Deadly Invasion"
1967	Bonanza	Count Alexis	"The Prince"
1967	Mission: Impossible	Karl de Groot	"The Slave"
1967	Voyage to the Bottom of the Sea	Van Wyck	"Cave of the Dead"
1968	Star Trek	Rojan	"By Any Other Name"
1968	Mission: Impossible	Frank Layton	"The Bargain"
1968	Bonanza	Sam Bragan	"The Trackers"
1970	Bonanza	Owen Driscoll	"El Jefe"
1971	Sarge	Peter Scott	"Psst! Wanna Buy a Dirty Picture?"
1971	Adam-12	Art McCall	“The Dinosaur”
1972	Mission: Impossible	Thor Coffin	"Image"
1975	M*A*S*H	Colonel Chaffey	"The Gun"
1978	Wonder Woman	Beal	"The Murderous Missile"
1980	Quincy, M.E.	Wayne Fields	"Last Rites"
