= Jack McCall, Desperado =

1953 film by Sidney Salkow

- Film poster
- Directed by: Sidney Salkow
- Screenplay by: John O'Dea
- Story by: David Chandler
- Produced by: Sam Katzman
- Starring: George Montgomery
- Cinematography: Henry Freulich
- Edited by: Aaron Stell
- Color process: Technicolor
- Production company: Columbia Pictures
- Distributed by: Columbia Pictures
- Release date: April 1, 1953
- Running time: 76 minutes
- Country: United States
- Language: English

Jack McCall, Desperado is a 1953 American Western film directed by Sidney Salkow and starring George Montgomery. It portrays the historical shooting of Wild Bill Hickok by Jack McCall in 1876.

The film's sets were designed by the art director Paul Palmentola.

== Plot ==
Jack McCall is a Southerner who joins the Union during the civil war. When he encounters three Confederate soldiers posing as Yankees, including one named Spargo, Jack tells them the place where the headquarters is located. Soon after he is tried as a spy. Jack manages to escape, and returns home to tell his parents what really happened. He is followed by his cousin Bat McCall and sergeant Bill Hickok who arrive as Jack is leaving through the back door. When Jack's father reaches for a rifle Hickok shoots him, then Bat unwittingly shoots Jack's mother through an upstairs door. Hickok tells Bat that now he has inherited the estate, and Hickok will share in the management.

Jack escapes and tries to track down the Confederate soldiers who tricked him, but has still not found them when peace is declared. After the war Jack tries to prove his innocence and asks Spargo to testify. Spargo first agrees, but when Jack is captured again, Spargo decides to join Hickok and Bat. With the help of Rose Griffith, Jack manages to escape again and hopes to clear his name. Meanwhile, Hickok, Bat and Spargo have left for Kansas City. In search for gold, they plan to destroy the Sioux Indians. Jack, while still trying to clear his name, becomes aware of their plans and tries to stop them.

== Cast ==
- George Montgomery as Jack McCall
- Angela Stevens as Rose Griffith
- Douglas Kennedy as 'Wild' Bill Hickok
- James Seay as Bat McCall
- Eugene Iglesias as Grey Eagle
- Willam Tannen as Spargo
- Jay Silverheels as Red Cloud
- John Hamilton as Col. Cornish
- Selmer Jackson as Col. Brand

== Production ==
In November 1951 Katzan announced the film as part of his slate for the upcoming year.

In January 1952 Katzman announced that George Montgomery would make two films for the producer, this and The Pathfinder.

In April Douglas Kennedy was cast as Wild Bill Hickok.

== Historical inaccuracy ==
The real Jack McCall was born in 1852 or 1853, and was therefore too young to have been enlisted in the Union Army during the American Civil War. Nor did he have occasion to meet ("sergeant") Bill Hickok during the war.

== Bibliography ==
- Douglas Brode. Shooting Stars of the Small Screen: Encyclopedia of TV Western Actors, 1946–Present. University of Texas Press, 2010.
