= King of the Wild Stallions =

1959 film by R. G. Springsteen

- Directed by: R. G. Springsteen
- Written by: Ford Beebe
- Produced by: Ben Schwalb
- Starring: George Montgomery
- Cinematography: Carl E. Guthrie
- Edited by: George White
- Music by: Marlin Skiles
- Color process: Color by DeLuxe
- Production company: Allied Artists Pictures
- Distributed by: Allied Artists Pictures
- Release date: May 17, 1959
- Running time: 76 minutes
- Country: United States
- Language: English

King of the Wild Stallions is a 1959 American CinemaScope Western film directed by R. G. Springsteen and starring George Montgomery.

== Plot ==
A wild stallion provides unexpected help to a widow and her young son in their efforts to keep their ranch.

== Cast ==
- George Montgomery as Randy Burke
- Diane Brewster as Martha Morse
- Edgar Buchanan as Idaho
- Emile Meyer as Matt Macguire
- Jerry Hartleben as Bucky Morse
- Byron Foulger as A.B. Orcutt
- Denver Pyle as Doc Webber
- Dan Sheridan as Woody Baines
- Rory Mallinson as Sheriff Cap Fellows
