= Ride the Tiger (film) =

- Directed by: Ferde Grofé Jr.
- Screenplay by: Ferde Grofé Jr.
- Starring: George Montgomery
- Release date: 1970
- Running time: 96 mins
- Countries: United States; Philippines
- Language: English

Ride the Tiger is a 1970 American film starring George Montgomery and directed by Ferde Grofe Jr.. It also starred Victoria Shaw, Marshall Thompson and Colombian American actor Andre Marquis. It also featured notable Hollywood producer Peter MacGregor-Scott, working at that time as the film's production manager in the role of a villain.

== Plot ==
The partner of a slain nightclub owner seeks out an Asian underworld big shot.

== Cast ==
- George Montgomery
- Victoria Shaw
- Marshall Thompson

== Production ==
In 1966, Montgomery announced the second of two films he'd make with Ferde Grofé Jr., the first being Warkill. Grofé later said the film would be part of a slate of 12 movies he was making for Balut Productions.
