= Springtime in the Rockies (1937 film) =

1937 film

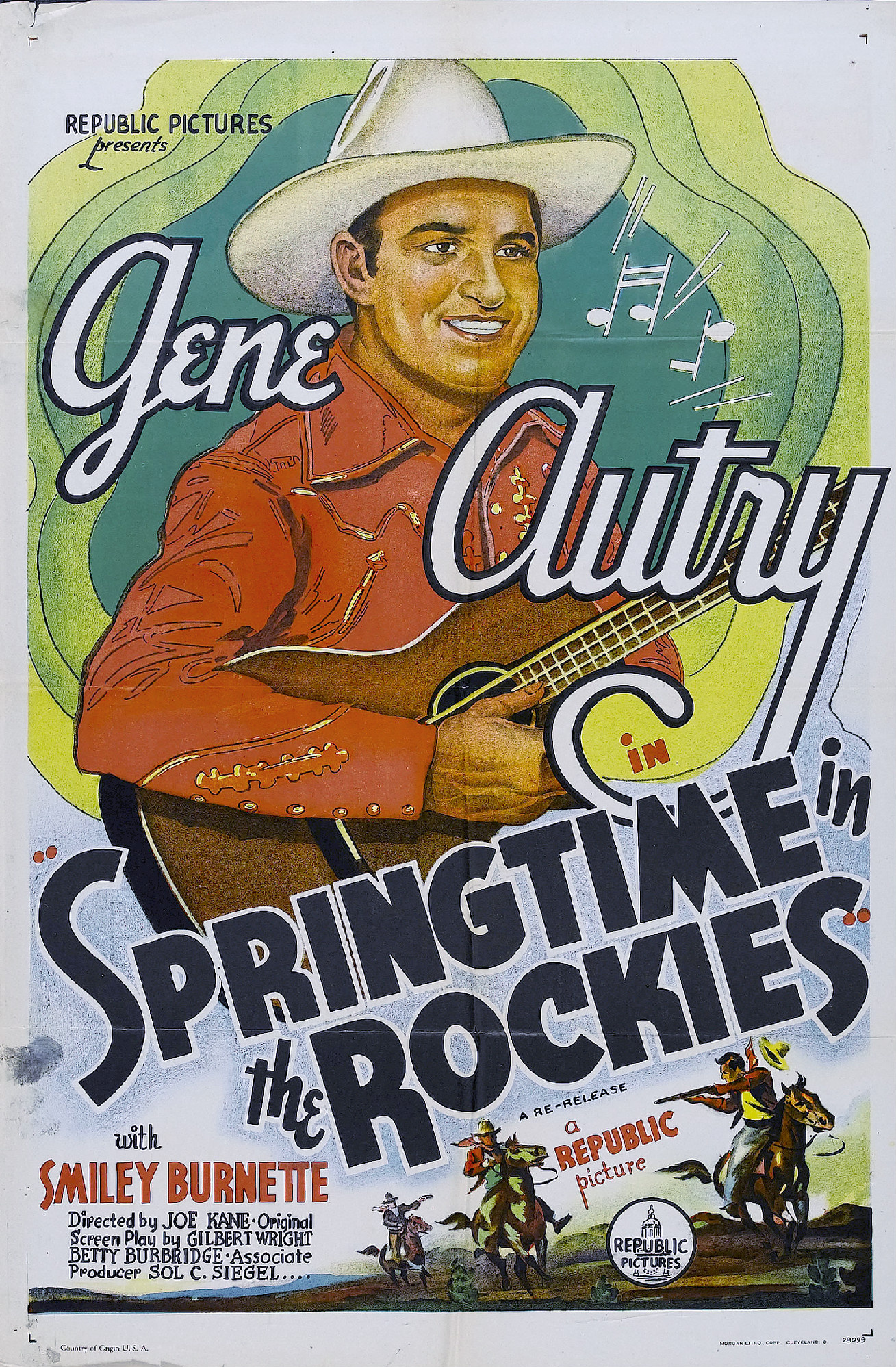
- Theatrical release poster
- Directed by: Joseph Kane
- Written by: Gilbert Wright; Betty Burbridge
- Produced by: Sol C. Siegel (associate)
- Starring: Gene Autry; Smiley Burnette; Polly Rowles
- Cinematography: Ernest Miller
- Edited by: Lester Orlebeck
- Music by: Alberto Colombo
- Production company: Republic Pictures
- Distributed by: Republic Pictures
- Release date: November 13, 1937 (U.S.)
- Running time: 60 minutes
- Country: United States
- Language: English

Springtime in the Rockies is a 1937 American Western film directed by Joseph Kane and starring Gene Autry, Smiley Burnette, and Polly Rowles. Written by Gilbert Wright and Betty Burbridge, the film is about a ranch owner who brings a flock of sheep into cattle country and faces the opposition of local ranchers with the help of her ranch foreman.

== Plot ==
Gene Autry (Gene Autry), the Knight Ranch foreman, learns that a neighboring rancher Jed Thorpe (Edward Hearn) is bringing sheep into the area. Gene rushes to Thorpe's ranch, concerned that a hot-headed cattle rancher named Thad Morgan (George Chesebro) may try to kill Thorpe. Morgan was once ruined financially by sheep ranching. Gene is able to stop Thorpe from bringing in the sheep, and Thorpe agrees to send the sheep back.

Sometime later, Sandra Knight (Polly Rowles), who inherited the Knight Ranch from her late uncle, arrives in town with three female friends, who studied animal husbandry with her at the agricultural college. Before reaching the ranch, Sandra is approached by Thorpe's partner Briggs (Al Bridge) who sells her the sheep. Continuing on to the ranch with the sheep, Sandra nearly hits Gene and his horse Champion. Learning about the sheep deal, Gene tries to dissuade Sandra from raising sheep, explaining that they eat grass to the root so that it cannot grow back, but Sandra doesn't listen to him.

Instead of taking her to her ranch, Gene shows her to his own rocky ground and ramshackle cabin, telling her that it's her ranch. That night, as the girls try to sleep, Gene's friend, Frog Millhouse (Smiley Burnette), makes wild animal noises to scare the girls into leaving the next day. One such noise sends Sandra into Gene's arms, and she asks him to sleep on the porch. The following day, Gene and Sandra go riding and come across the beautiful house and fertile land that is actually hers. Gene, who is falling in love with Sandra, is about to tell her the truth when she says she wants to lease the rocky land (Gene's) for her sheep.

When Morgan learns about the sheep on Gene's ranch, he rides there intending to shoot them, but Gene is able to stop him. Gene agrees to the sheriff's demand that he remove the sheep from the area in twenty-four hours. When Gene notices Frog applying Mercurochrome to a wound, he gets the idea to paint the sheep so that they will appear to have hoof-and-mouth disease.

After Briggs discovers that Sandra believes she owns Gene's ranch, he offers her $5,000 for her property—a bargain for Gene's ranch, but far below the value of her own ranch, worth an estimated $100,000. When Sandra sees the painted sheep appearing diseased, she accepts Briggs's offer to buy them, and Briggs delivers the sheep to Morgan. That night at the dance, needing to keep Gene from interfering while Sandra signs over her ranch without understanding the legal implications, Briggs tells Sandra about Gene's trick. Angered by the ruse, Sandra fires Gene. Later, when Morgan confronts Gene about the sheep and draws on him, Gene pulls out his gun which fires before Gene pulls the trigger—Thorpe had rigged the gun earlier that evening. Morgan is wounded and Gene is arrested.

Sandra decides to accept Briggs' offer to buy the ranch and tells her girlfriends to pack. After informing Gene about the sale, Frog helps him escape by putting up a wrecking company sign in front of the jail and paying a truck driver to pull the wall off the building. Pursued by the sheriff and a mob, Gene rides after Briggs and Sandra. After Sandra signs the deed over to Briggs, Gene pursues Briggs to the county seat and rips up the deed. The sheriff is informed that Morgan, after regaining consciousness, identified Thorpe as the one who shot him. Gene and the sheriff shake hands, and later, Gene and Sandra go for a romantic ride through her ranch.

== Cast ==
- Gene Autry as Gene Autry
- Smiley Burnette as Frog Millhouse
- Polly Rowles as Sandra Knight
- Ula Love as Sylvia Parker
- Ruth Bacon as Peggy Snow
- Jane Hunt as Jane Hilton
- George Chesebro as Thad Morgan
- Al Bridge as Briggs
- Tom London as Tracy
- Edward Hearn as Jed Thorpe
- Frankie Marvin as Autry's Musical Cowhand
- William Hole as Bub, the Messenger
- Edmund Cobb as Sheriff
- Fred Burns as Rancher Harris
- Jimmy's Saddle Pals as Musical Ranch Hands
- Champion the Wonder Horse as Gene's Horse (uncredited)

== Production ==
=== Filming locations ===
- Garner Valley, California, USA
- Keen Camp, State Highway 74, Mountain Center, San Jacinto Mountains, California, USA
- Palm Springs, California, USA

=== Soundtrack ===
- "When It's Springtime in the Rockies" (Mary Hale Woolsey/Robert Sauer) by Gene Autry, Smiley Burnette, Jimmy's Saddle Pals, and George Chesebro
- "Give Me a Pony and an Open Prairie" (Gene Autry, Frank Harford) by Gene Autry with Jimmy's Saddle Pals
- "Vitamin D" (Traditional) by Ula Love, Ruth Bacon, and Jane Hunt
- "The Moon is Ridin'" (Leonid S. Leonardi, Winston Tharp) by Gene Autry, Ula Love, Ruth Bacon and Jane Hunt
- "Sing Your Song, Cowboy" by Jimmy's Saddle Pals
- "Way Down Low" (Smiley Burnette) by Smiley Burnette
- "There'll Be a Hayridin' Wedding in June" (Gene Autry, Johnny Marvin) by Gene Autry, Polly Rowles, Ula Love, Ruth Bacon, Jane Hunt and Jimmy's Saddle Pals
- "Bridal Chorus (Here Comes the Bride)" (Richard Wagner, from Lohengrin)
- "Down in the Land of Zulu" (Gene Autry, Johnny Marvin) by Ula Love, Ruth Bacon, Jane Hunt, and Smiley Burnette
- "Buffalo Gals (Won't You Come Out Tonight)" (William Cool White) by Jimmy's Saddle Pals
- "You're the Only Star in My Blue Heaven" by Gene Autry
- "The Wild and Woolly West" (Sam H. Stept, Ted Koehler)

== Memorable quotes ==
- Gene Autry: You know you can't sing and be mean at the same time.
- Frog Millhouse: Well, I'll be hung for a horse thief. Soil testin' equipment. Encyclopedias. VTC and chemicals and poison. Well, who in blazes sent all this junk out here?

Gene Autry: That's easy, our lady boss. She's goin' to an agricultural college and takin' animal husbandry.
Frog Millhouse: Husbandry, huh? Well, it do beat all what a woman will do to get married.

- Sylvia Parker: Watch me break down their resistance. Well, pards, I reckon you hombres are figgerin' on a rip-snortin' bang-up shindig tonight.

Cowhand: What did she say?
Gene Autry: Hombres. A colloquialism indigenous to the southwest. Derived from the Latin, "Homo".
