= Mary Hale Woolsey =

Mary Elizabeth Hale Woolsey
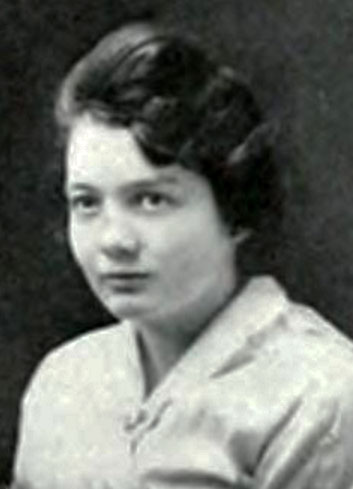
- Mary Woolsey in the 1917 Banyan
- Born: March 21, 1899; Spanish Fork, Utah, US
- Died: December 6, 1969 (aged 70); Santa Monica, California, US
- Occupation: Lyricist
- Notable work: "When It's Springtime in the Rockies"
- Spouse: Parley Woolsey

Mary Hale Woolsey (March 21, 1899 – December 6, 1969) was an American songwriter and lyricist. She is most noted for the lyrics she wrote for "When It's Springtime in the Rockies".

== Early life ==
Mary Elizabeth Hale Woolsey was born on March 21, 1899, in Spanish Fork, Utah. Her parents were John Thompson Hale and Sarah Elizabeth Stewart Hale. She was one of nine children. She grew up in Provo, Utah. She was inspired by the mountains and love.

Mary Elizabeth graduated from Brigham Young High School in 1917. She was a class officer in her Junior year of high school. She was married to Parley Woolsey on June 6, 1917. The couple lived in Ontario, Oregon for a time. However, they moved to Salt Lake City, Utah after the birth of their daughter Lael in 1919. They had four children. They later went through divorce and Parley remarried in 1954.

== Career ==
=== "When It's Springtime in the Rockies" ===
Woolsey began songwriting at a young age. By 1934 she had written over 60 songs that had been put to music, and many of which had been published. "When It's Springtime in the Rockies" was her most notable work. It was first published in 1929. She was inspired by the nature of Utah Lake and Provo Canyon. She sent the lyrics to Robert Sauer a leader of a German band, and a band director at Brigham Young University. He made various arrangements of the song for bands and quartets. The song was rejected by 14 publishers, until it was finally bought by Villa-Moret Inc. from San Francisco. She did not hear from him. She did, however, hear her lyrics in a song years later. She looked up the legend of the piece and saw that the lyrics had been attributed to T. Snow. Apparently Sauer had lost her name and invented the name T. Snow when the song was printed. She confronted Sauer who agreed to put her name on the next printings of the song. The two made a contract together.

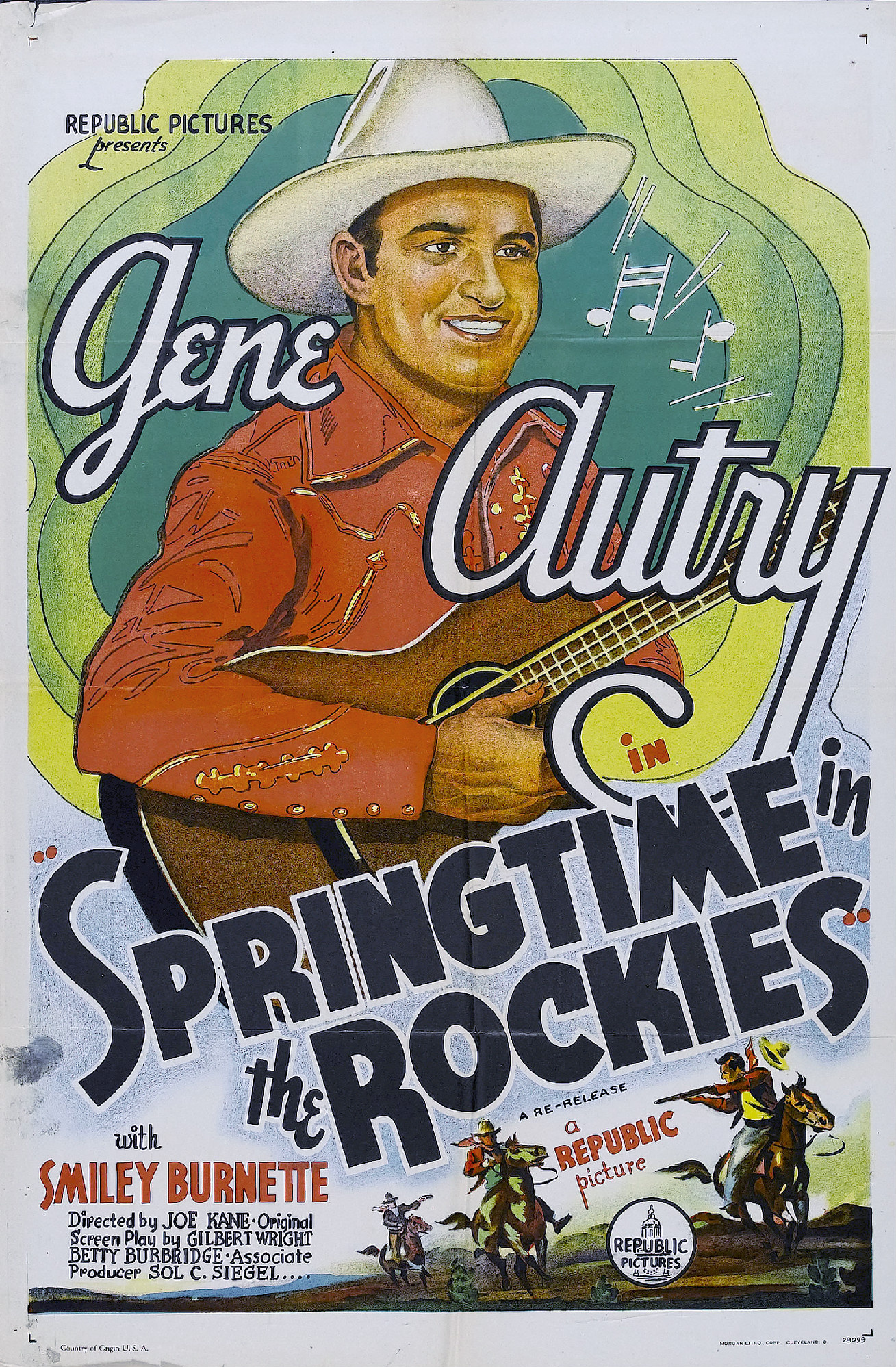
Springtime in the Rockies (1937) film poster

The song gained popularity in the Provo area and at Brigham Young University. Earl J. Glade, manager of the KSL radio station in Salt Lake City, Utah, named "When It's Springtime in the Rockies" the national song of Utah and the West. A popular radio duo of the time, Bob and Monte, was requested to sing the song and later record it. After the recording was sent to publishers thirteen times, it was finally released. Later Milt Taggart, who was the head of a music store in Salt Lake, had the copy of the song. He made a contract with Woolsey and Sauer that he would split the profits with them if there were any. They sold the song to Charlie Daniels. Milt Taggart was named the co-author. The song was heard worldwide and became a bestseller in England.

The song title was used as the title for the 1937 film Springtime in the Rockies, in which the song was also used. It was later used as the name of the 1942 film Springtime in the Rockies. The Fox Entertainment Group who produced the film paid $1,000 to avoid copyright issues since they, too, used the song "When It's Springtime in the Rockies".

=== Other contributions ===
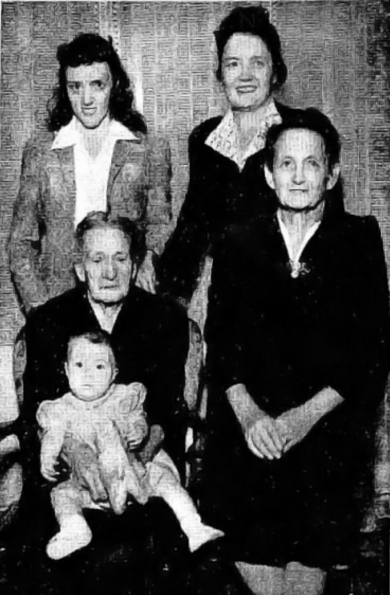
Five generations of Woolsey's family: Vevedeen Hill (back left), Mary Hale Woolsey (back right), Hannah Case Stewart (front left), Elizabeth Evanh (front right), Becky Hill (baby, 7 months old)

During the depression, Woolsey continued to write songs. Woolsey wrote the libretto for an operetta for children. The operetta was called The Giant's Garden and feature music by Seldon N. Heaps.

Woolsey also wrote the words to several other songs, including "When the Cottonwoods are Yellow" and "By the Silv'ry Colorado". She also compiled a book of 15 waltz songs that was called Songs that Reach the Heart. She later wrote "Colorado Skies" which Taggart contributed to. They formed the Taggart-Woolsey-Brown Publishing Company in Salt Lake City.

Woolsey worked with Glen Spencer, a radio and recording director. Spencer began an all-girl musical group for a radio show, and Woolsey wrote the opening lines. Ten of her song lyrics were used by Spencer. Four of her lyrics were used by the composer Will Livernas. For her musical contributions she became a member of the American Society of Composers, Authors and Publishers (ASCAP). Among her other published works are the text to "I Have a Garden, A Lovely Garden" and "When O'er the Valley the Shadows are Gray".

As well as song lyrics, Woolsey wrote fiction books. She also sold stories to magazines, and for some time worked with a newspaper in Hollywood.

Woolsey died on December 6, 1969, in Santa Monica, California. She was buried in the Salt Lake City Cemetery.
