= Rough Riders' Round-up =

1939 film by Joseph Kane

- Directed by: Joseph Kane
- Written by: Jack Natteford (original screenplay)
- Produced by: Joseph Kane (associate producer)
- Starring: Roy Rogers
- Cinematography: Jack A. Marta
- Edited by: Lester Orlebeck
- Music by: William Lava; Joseph Nussbaum
- Distributed by: Republic Pictures
- Release date: 13 March 1939
- Running time: 58 minutes (original version); 54 minutes (edited version)
- Country: United States
- Language: English

Rough Riders' Round-up is a 1939 American Western film directed by Joseph Kane and starring Roy Rogers.

== Plot ==
At the end of the Spanish–American War, Rogers and several of his comrades in arms from the Rough Riders become US Border Patrolmen on the Mexican border.

== Cast ==
- Roy Rogers as Roy Rogers
- Lynne Roberts as Dorothy Blair
- Raymond Hatton as Rusty Coburn
- Eddie Acuff as Tommy Ward
- William Pawley as Arizona Jack Moray
- Dorothy Sebastian as Rose
- George Meeker as George Lanning
- Guy Usher as Mr. Blair
- Duncan Renaldo as Border Commandante

== Soundtrack ==
- Roy Rogers - "Ridin' Down the Trail" (Written by Eddie Cherkose, Cy Feuer and Roy Rogers)
- Roy Rogers - "Here on the Range With You" (Written by Tim Spencer)
- Soldiers during the opening credits - "When Johnny Comes Marching Home" (Written by Louis Lambert, a pseudonym for Patrick Sarsfield Gilmore)
