= Irving Gertz =

American composer (1915–2008)

- Born: May 19, 1915; Providence, Rhode Island, US
- Died: November 14, 2008 (aged 93); Los Angeles, California, US
- Known for: Horror composor
- Children: 2

Irving Gertz (May 19, 1915 – November 14, 2008) was an American composer recognized for his compositions for many fantasy and horror B-movies and TV series of the 1950s and 1960s.

== Biography ==
Gertz was born on May 19, 1915, in Providence, Rhode Island, and played the clarinet, piano, string bass and tuba as a youth, and attended the Providence College of Music. Gertz studied composition privately with composer and music theorist Walter Piston. He was hired by Columbia Pictures in 1938, but left to serve in the United States Army Signal Corps during World War II.

After his military service, he studied with composer Mario Castelnuovo-Tedesco.

== Filmography ==
Amongst his most recognized works are the music for the westerns Top Gun (1955) and Badman's Country (1958), and many horror films (often uncredited), such as The Alligator People (1959), Curse of the Undead (1959) and The Leech Woman (1960). His later film scores included Hell Bent for Leather (1960), Young Jesse James (1960), Marines, Let's Go (1961), The Fiercest Heart (1961), He Rides Tall (1964), Fluffy (1965) and Nobody's Perfect (1968).

In addition to his work with film, Gertz also worked on the popular 20th Century Fox TV series Daniel Boone, Land of the Giants and Voyage to the Bottom of the Sea. He also worked on a single Warner Bros. cartoon Daffy Rents in 1966, filling in for regular composer William Lava.

== Retirement ==
Gertz retired from film and television scoring in 1968.
