= Frontier Pony Express =

1939 film

- Theatrical release poster
- Directed by: Joseph Kane
- Written by: Norman S. Hall (original story and screenplay)
- Produced by: Joseph Kane (associate producer)
- Starring: Roy Rogers
- Cinematography: William Nobles
- Edited by: Gene Milford
- Distributed by: Republic Pictures
- Release date: April 12, 1939
- Running time: 58 minutes 54 minutes(American edited version)
- Country: United States
- Language: English

Frontier Pony Express is a 1939 American Western film directed by Joseph Kane and starring Roy Rogers, Lynne Roberts (as Mary Hart) and Noble Johnson as the lead villain.

== Plot ==
At the start of the American Civil War in 1861 the Pony Express is of vital importance to the United States. A Confederate secret agent, Brett Langhorne, is working undercover by purchasing the newspaper in the town of St. Joe. Accompanied by his sister they meet Roy Rogers, a Pony Express rider, who rescues her from a runaway stagecoach. Brett unsuccessfully tries to get Roy to work for money to help the Confederacy.

Brett's local contact is Senator Calhoun Lassiter who Brett and the Confederacy believe will assist in bringing California into the Confederacy. But Lassiter betrays both the United States of America and the Confederacy as he wants to make California an independent "Republic of the Pacific" that he will despotically rule. To this end, Lassiter commissions outlaw Luke Johnson and his gang to steal, by force, critical documents being transmitted through the town of St. Joe by Pony Express. Roy risks limb and life to protect the mission of the Pony Express against the vicious outlaws, unaware of the Confederate agents supporting them. He finally learns the full extent of the plot when Lassiter and Langhorne have a falling out, and Lassiter shoots the young man in the back; and Langhorne confesses the plot to Roy as he dies. Rogers, the Pony Express officials, and the cavalry then work out a plan which brings an end to the machinations of Lassiter and Johnson.

== Principal cast ==
- Roy Rogers as Pony Express Rider Roy Rogers
- Mary Hart as Ann Langhorne
- Don Dillaway as Brett Langhorne
- Noble Johnson as Luke Johnson
- Edward Keane as Sen. Calhoun Lassiter
- Raymond Hatton as Horseshoe the Trapper
- William Royle as Dan Garrett
- Ethel Wales as Mrs. Murphy (Langhorne's housekeeper)
- Jack Kirk as Cavalry Captain
- Monte Blue as "Cherokee", a rider

== Soundtrack ==
- Roy Rogers - "My Old Kentucky Home"
- Roy Rogers - "Rusty Spurs"

== See also ==
- List of films and television shows about the American Civil War
