= The Arizona Kid (1939 film) =

1939 film by Joseph Kane

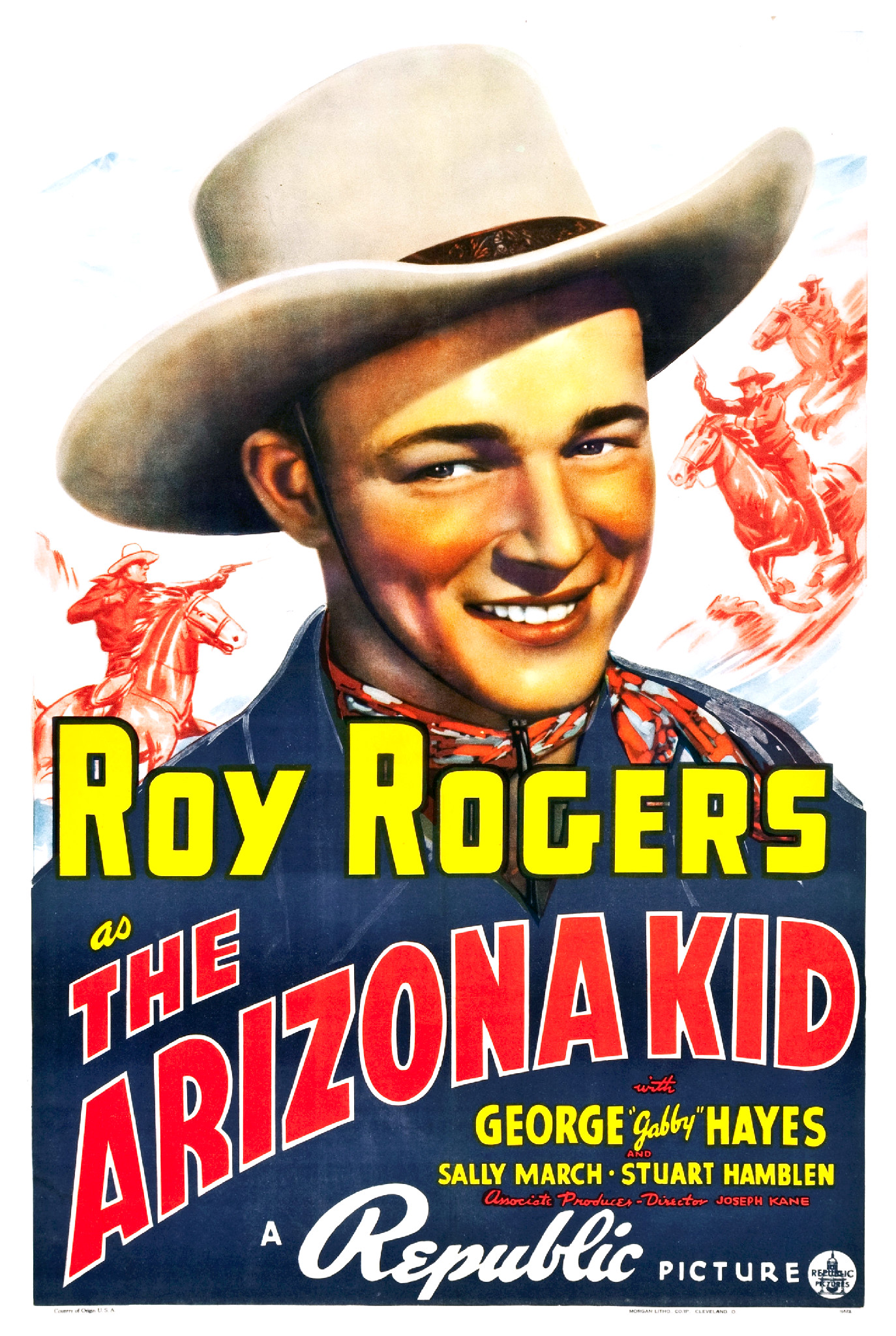
- Theatrical release poster
- Directed by: Joseph Kane
- Written by: Luci Ward, Gerald Geraghty
- Produced by: Joseph Kane
- Starring: Roy Rogers
- Cinematography: William Nobles, Edgar Lyons
- Edited by: Lester Orlebeck
- Music by: Floyd Morgan
- Production company: Republic Pictures
- Distributed by: Republic Pictures
- Release date: September 29, 1939 (United States)
- Running time: 61 minutes 54 minutes
- Country: United States
- Language: English

The Arizona Kid is a 1939 American Western film directed by Joseph Kane under the Republic Pictures banner. The film stars Roy Rogers as a Confederate officer in Missouri during the American Civil War.

== Plot ==
Roy and Gabby are Confederate scouts in Missouri during the American Civil War. Val McBride is a William Quantrill type Confederate guerilla officer, who doesn’t play by the rules. When Roy first rides into town, he encounters an old childhood friend, Dave Allen. Dave tells Roy that he has joined McBride’s guerilla force and Roy is not pleased. He tells Dave that McBride is not a man to be admired but Dave doesn’t listen.

McBride arrives at the saloon where Dave and Roy are talking and Roy and McBride nearly end up in a fight. The arrival of Union scouts prevents the fight as McBride and his force, including Dave, ride away. Shortly afterwards, McBride is told by his superior Confederate officer that he must play by the rules or be stripped of his command. McBride, furious that his effective (if crude and ungentlemanly) fighting is being scorned, leaves the Confederates and continues to fight both sides on his own.

Roy and Gabby are soon assigned to tracking down and killing McBride and his men. During a brief pause in their search, Roy, Gabby, and the men they have recruited agree to take a small shipment of gold through to another Confederate officer. En route, McBride attacks. Gabby is hurt, though not seriously, while Roy is nearly killed. Dave (still one of McBride’s men) hangs back and helps Gabby get Roy to a nearby cabin for help. Then he leaves to rejoin McBride.

Roy and Gabby set out to resume their search a few months later. After a long and dangerous search, Roy and Gabby find and corner McBride’s men including Dave, but McBride escapes. While Gabby commands the firing squad, Roy chases McBride to a local saloon and boarding house where the matron hides McBride and refuses to tell Roy where he is. McBride comes out and takes a shot at Roy but misses and Roy returns fire, killing McBride.

== Cast ==
- Roy Rogers as Roy Rogers The Arizona Kid
- George "Gabby" Hayes as "Gabby" Whittaker
- Sally March as Laura Radford
- Stuart Hamblen as Val McBride
- Dorothy Sebastian as Bess Warren
- Robert Middlemass as General Stark
- Earl Dwire as Dr. Jason Radford
- David Kerwin as Dave Allen
- Peter Fargo as Henchman Sheldon
- Fred Burns as Melton – Volunteer
- Lisa Ann as Mother of Roy Rogers

The Arizona Kid 1939

== See also ==
- List of films and television shows about the American Civil War
