= Maurice Geraghty =

American screenwriter (1908–1987)

- Born: September 29, 1908; Rushville, Indiana, U.S.
- Died: June 30, 1987 (aged 78); Palm Springs, California, U.S.
- Occupations: Screenwriter, director, producer
- Years active: 1930–1956
- Parent: Thomas J. Geraghty
- Relatives: Gerald Geraghty (brother); Carmelita Geraghty (sister)

Maurice Geraghty (September 29, 1908 – June 30, 1987) was an American screenwriter, film director and producer.

== Early life ==
Geraghty was the son of Tom Geraghty. His brother Gerald was also a screenwriter; and his sister was silent film actress and painter Carmelita Geraghty.

After writing a variety of serials and films for Republic Pictures, several of Geraghty's screenplays were used by major studios. He began a career as a producer for RKO Pictures producing several of the Falcon film series.

Geraghty returned to screenwriting and made his directing debut with The Sword of Monte Cristo (1951). He entered television as both teleplaywright and director.

== Selected filmography ==
- The Adventures of Rex and Rinty (1935)
- The Phantom Empire (1935)
- The Fighting Marines (1935)
- Undersea Kingdom (1936)
- The Vigilantes Are Coming (1936)
- Robinson Crusoe of Clipper Island (1936)
- Hit the Saddle (1937)
- The Mysterious Rider (1938)
- Law of the Plains (1938)
- The Falcon's Brother (1942)
- The Falcon Strikes Back (1943)
- The Falcon in Danger (1943)
- Good Morning, Judge (1943)
- The Falcon Out West (1944)
- The Falcon in San Francisco (1945)
- Who Killed Doc Robbin (1948)
- Whiplash (1948)
- Red Canyon (1949)
- The Sword of Monte Cristo (1951)
- Mohawk (1956)
- Love Me Tender (1956)
