= Alice Fleming =

American actress (1882–1952)

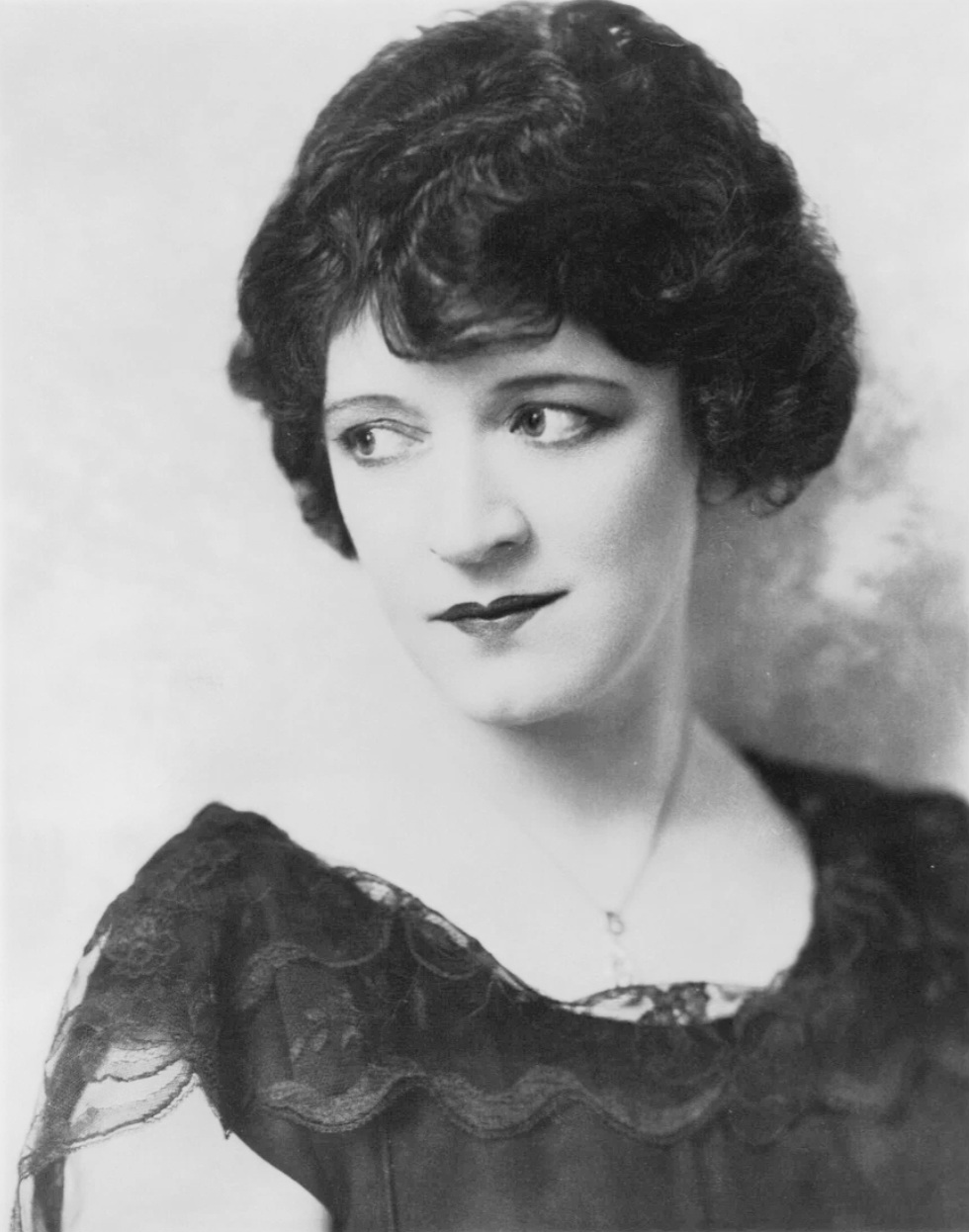
- Fleming c. 1920s
- Born: Alice Fleming; August 9, 1882; Brooklyn, New York, U.S.
- Died: December 6, 1952 (aged 70); New York City, U.S.
- Occupation: Actress
- Years active: 1920s–1962
- Spouse(s): Clarence V. Everett (1910–?); William Day

Alice Fleming (August 9, 1882 – December 6, 1952) was an American character actress in many films who also enjoyed considerable success on Broadway. She is best remembered as the Duchess, Wild Bill Elliott's aunt in the Republic Pictures' Red Ryder Western features.

== Biography ==
Born in Brooklyn, New York, Fleming was the leading actress with the Harry Davis, Baker, and Percy G. Williams stock companies. Her Broadway credits included When We Are Married (1939), Window Shopping (1938), 30 Days Hath September (1938), Stick-in-the-Mud (1935), One More Honeymoon (1934), The Pelican (1925), Thrills (1925), So this is Politics (Strange Bedfellows) (1924), The Lullaby (1923), Morphia (1923), The Masked Woman (1922), and As Ye Mould (1921).

Fleming appeared in several silent films, usually playing a young society matron. In the 1921 film His Greatest Sacrifice, she played William Farnum's wife. Her final film was Storm Over Lisbon (1944).

In 1910, Fleming married real estate agent Clarence V. Everett. She later married William Day. She died on December 6, 1952, in New York City.

== Filmography ==
- 1946 – Queen of Burlesque as Annie Morris
- 1946 – The Dark Horse as Mrs. Garfield
- 1946 – Sun Valley Cyclone as The Duchess
- 1946 – The Dark Corner in Minor Role
- 1946 – The Dark Corner
- 1946 – Mantrap
- 1946 – Sheriff of Redwood Valley as The Duchess
- 1946 – California Gold Rush as The Duchess
- 1945 – Wagon Wheels Westward as The Duchess
- 1945 – Saratoga Trunk as Woman on Piazza
- 1945 – Colorado Pioneers as The Duchess
- 1945 – Marshal of Laredo as The Duchess
- 1945 – Phantom of the Plains as The Duchess, Red's Aunt
- 1945 – State Fair as Food Judge
- 1945 – Lone Texas Ranger as The Duchess, Red's Aunt
- 1945 – A Medal for Benny as Dowager
- 1945 – The Affairs of Susan as Dowager
- 1945 – It's a Pleasure as Carrie
- 1945 – Great Stagecoach Robbery as The Duchess
- 1945 – Youth for the Kingdom as Mrs. Webber
- 1944 – Sheriff of Las Vegas as The Duchess
- 1944 – Sunday Dinner for a Soldier in Minor Role
- 1944 – Three Is a Family as Grandmother
- 1944 – Vigilantes of Dodge City as The Duchess
- 1944 – Storm Over Lisbon as Agatha Sanford-Richards
- 1944 – Cheyenne Wildcat as The Duchess
- 1944 – In Society as Dowager
- 1944 – The San Antonio Kid as The Duchess
- 1944 – Reckless Age as Irish Woman
- 1944 – Marshal of Reno as The Duchess
- 1944 – Tucson Raiders as The Duchess
- 1944 – Her Primitive Man as Wealthy Lady
- 1944 – Phantom Lady as Apple Annie
- 1943 – Moonlight in Vermont as Mrs. Finchley
- 1943 – Mystery Broadcast as Mida Kent
- 1943 – Overland Mail Robbery as Mrs. Patterson
- 1943 – Fired Wife in Minor Role
- 1943 – Headin' for God's Country in Minor Role
- 1943 – The Mantrap as Miss Mason
- 1943 – Sherlock Holmes in Washington as Mrs. Jellison
- 1943 – Keep 'Em Slugging as Matron
- 1942 – Who Done It? as Mrs. Laffingwell Telephoning Moscow
- 1941 – Playmates as Mrs. Penelope Pennypacker
- 1937 – Dick Tracy (serial) as Orphanage Matron
- 1922 – Silas Marner as Dolly Winthrop
- 1921 – The Conquest of Canaan as Claudine
- 1921 – His Greatest Sacrifice as Alice Hall
- 1921 – Women Men Love
- 1919 – The Pleasant Devil as Mrs. Thorndyke-Brook
- 1919 – The Beloved Cheater as Brook

== See also ==
- Red Ryder
- Vigilantes of Dodge City
