= Pride of the Plains =

1944 film by Wallace Fox

- Theatrical release poster
- Directed by: Wallace Fox
- Screenplay by: John K. Butler; Robert Creighton Williams
- Story by: Oliver Drake
- Produced by: Louis Gray
- Starring: Robert Livingston; Smiley Burnette; Nancy Gay; Steve Barclay; Kenneth MacDonald; Charles Miller
- Cinematography: John MacBurnie
- Edited by: Charles Craft
- Music by: Mort Glickman
- Production company: Republic Pictures
- Distributed by: Republic Pictures
- Release date: January 5, 1944
- Running time: 55 minutes
- Country: United States
- Language: English

Pride of the Plains is a 1944 American Western film directed by Wallace Fox and written by John K. Butler and Robert Creighton Williams. The film stars Robert Livingston, Smiley Burnette, Nancy Gay, Steve Barclay, Kenneth MacDonald and Charles Miller. The film was released on January 5, 1944, by Republic Pictures.

== Plot ==
Laws that protect wild horses frustrate cowboy Dan Hurley (Kenneth MacDonald) who wants to sell the horses. In an effort to get the laws changed, Hurley has his shady partners paint his trained horse to disguise it, then get the horse to kill a man; all in an effort to get his petition signed. Hero Johnny Revere (Robert Livingston) finds suspicious traces of paint on a horse, and attempts to arrest the Hurley gang. The effort goes south, and the bad guys capture Revere, then plan to have him be the next horse death victim.

== Cast ==
- Robert Livingston as Johnny Revere (John Paul Revere)
- Smiley Burnette as Frog Millhouse
- Nancy Gay as Joan Bradford
- Steve Barclay as Kenny Revere
- Kenneth MacDonald as Dan Hurley
- Charles Miller as Grant Bradford
- Kenne Duncan as Henchman Snyder
- Jack Kirk as Henchman Steve Craig
- Bud Geary as Henchman Gerard
- Yakima Canutt as Henchman Bowman
