= Overland Mail Robbery =

1943 film by John English

- Theatrical release poster
- Directed by: John English
- Screenplay by: Robert Creighton Williams; Robert Yost
- Story by: Robert Yost
- Produced by: Louis Gray
- Starring: Wild Bill Elliott; George "Gabby" Hayes; Anne Jeffreys; Alice Fleming; Weldon Heyburn; Kirk Alyn
- Cinematography: John MacBurnie
- Edited by: Charles Craft
- Music by: Mort Glickman
- Production company: Republic Pictures
- Distributed by: Republic Pictures
- Release date: November 20, 1943
- Running time: 56 minutes
- Country: United States
- Language: English

Overland Mail Robbery is a 1943 American Western film directed by John English and written by Robert Creighton Williams and Robert Yost. The film stars Wild Bill Elliott, George "Gabby" Hayes, Anne Jeffreys, Alice Fleming, Weldon Heyburn and Kirk Alyn. The film was released on November 20, 1943, by Republic Pictures.

== Cast ==
- Wild Bill Elliott as Wild Bill Elliott
- George "Gabby" Hayes as Gabby
- Anne Jeffreys as Judy Goodrich
- Alice Fleming as Mrs. Patterson
- Weldon Heyburn as John Patterson
- Kirk Alyn as Tom Hartley
- Roy Barcroft as David Patterson
- Nancy Gay as Lola Patterson
- Peter Michael as Jimmy Hartley
- Bud Geary as Henchman Slade
- Tom London as Sheriff
