= Lone Texas Ranger =

1945 film by Spencer Gordon Bennet

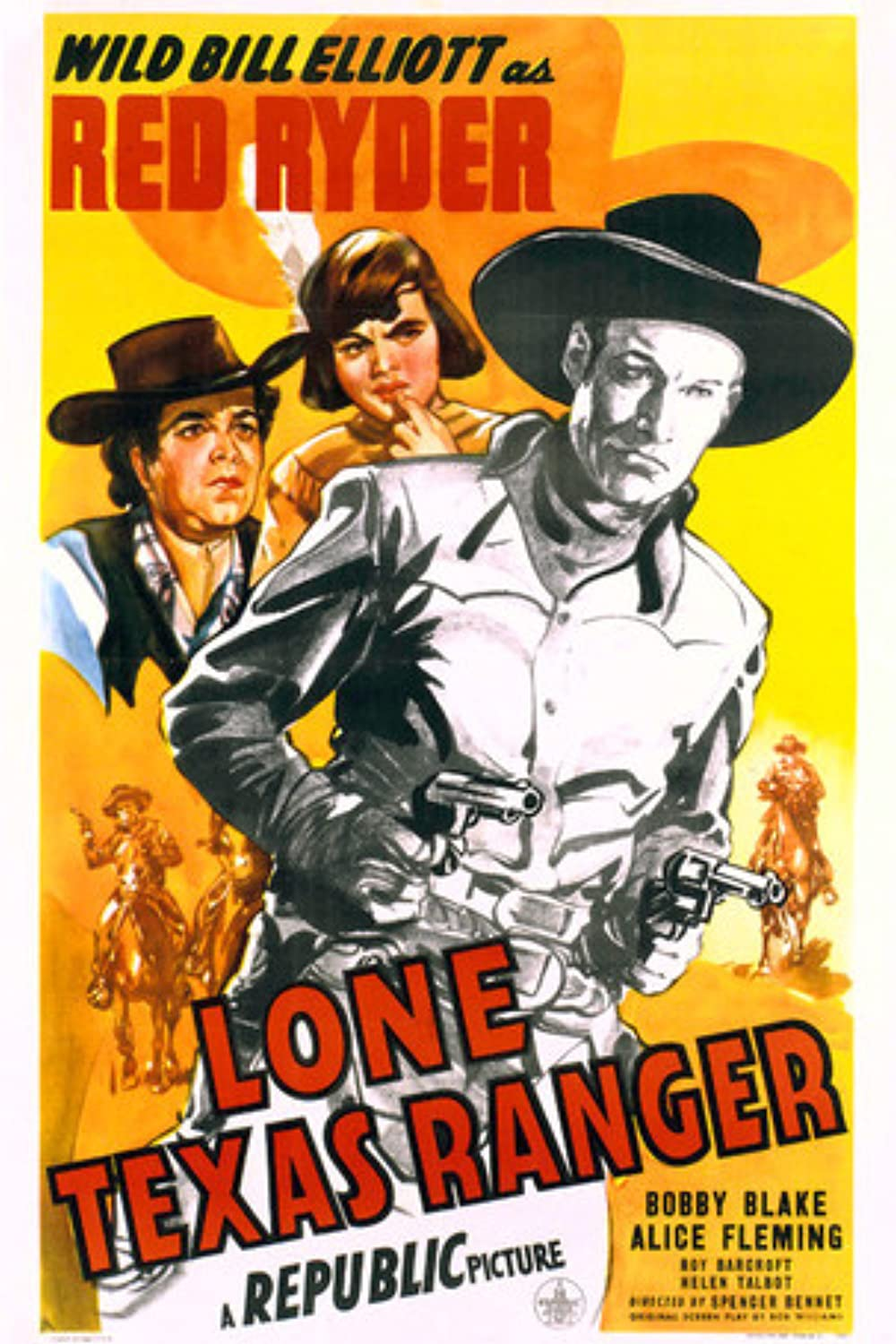
- Lone Star Ranger (1945) film poster.
- Directed by: Spencer Gordon Bennet
- Screenplay by: Robert Creighton Williams
- Based on: Fred Harman (comic strip characters)
- Produced by: Louis Gray
- Starring: Wild Bill Elliott
- Cinematography: Bud Thackery
- Edited by: Charles Craft
- Music by: Mort Glickman
- Production company: Republic Pictures
- Distributed by: Republic Pictures
- Release date: May 20, 1945 (United States)
- Running time: 56 minutes
- Country: United States
- Language: English

Lone Texas Ranger is a 1945 American Western film directed by Spencer Gordon Bennet starring Wild Bill Elliott in the role of Red Ryder and costarring as Little Beaver, actor (Bobby) Robert Blake. It was the eighth of twenty-three Red Ryder feature films that would be produced by Republic Pictures. The picture was shot on the studio's back lot along with outdoor locations at Iverson Ranch, 1 Iverson Lane, Chatsworth, Los Angeles, CA, USA.

== Plot ==
In the 1890s town of Silver City, "Iron Mike" Haines (Tom Chatterton), is a crooked sheriff who is celebrated for his character and ability to capture bad guys. The townspeople are completely unaware that he is corrupt and that the town blacksmith "Hands" Weber (Roy Barcroft), are partners in crime and are the ones instrumental in the robbing of stages and silver mines, and for framing innocent members of the population for their own misdeeds. As a result of their activities, the local Carter silver mines are near bankruptcy.

Bill Bradley (Jack Kirk), rides into town looking for a job. He talks to Weber who send him to his ranch house with instructions to wait until he can get there later that night. In the meantime, Sally Carter (Helen Talbot), of the Carter mines, waits in the company office with the Duchess (Alice Fleming), who is then introduced so Sheriff Haines. Suddenly, two of Haines's men, Whitey (Rex Lease, and Betcha (Bud Geary), kill Sally's uncle Horace and steal the silver that he is guarding. Haines pretends to chase the men, who return to Weber's ranch house and hide-out. They meet the cowboy, Bradley, who is angry to learn what had been done. They kill him and later Haines takes Bradley's body to town and claims that he was one of the robbers. Haines pretends to be grieved about not finding the silver however, Sally is grateful for his efforts.

The Duchess (Alice Fleming) is afraid that Sally will lose her money and so she offers financial help while she sends for her nephew, Red Ryder (Wild Bill Elliott), and his Indian Pal, Little Beaver (Robert Blake). When Red, now a Texas Ranger, and Little Beaver show up in Silver City, Sheriff Haines' son, Tommy (Jack McClendon) returns home, having graduated from college.

When Betcha and his gang try to rob a stagecoach, Red thwarts their attempt. Whitey escapes and head back to the hideout but is captured by Red Ryder. However, Haines fatally wounds White but in the process is himself shot by Red. Dying, Haines confesses but pleads with Red Ryder to tell his son. Secretly hiding, the henchman Betcha witnesses the shooting.

Red returns to Silver City and tells the townspeople that Haines died, serving the community, in the line of duty. The citizens begin building a monument and elect Tommy as the new Sheriff, in honor of his father. Hands Weber, in the meantime, orders his men to sabotage the mines so that Sally will finally be forced to close the operation. They set off a massive explosion however the miners agree to work for free until the next shipment of silver is made.

Betcha has returned to town and has informed Hands that it was Red Ryder who killed the Sheriff. On the day of the dedication, Hands passes this information along to Tommy who confronts Ryder. While they are fighting, Hand's gang steals the silver shipment, hiding it in a secret cellar of the blacksmith shop. Red renders Tommy unconscious and moves quickly to question Betcha. Tommy awakens and follows Red who finds the silver while Tommy learns the truth about Hand's involvement with the gang of outlaws and about his father.

Tommy declares that he will have nothing to do with the dedication, however he is persuaded otherwise by Red who convinces him that the townspeople need heroes and that in their eyes, his father was one. When Tommy sees a young child crying because, although he contributed all his pennies for the monument, he cannot attend the ceremony because of his dirty uniform. Tommy allows the boy to play in the band and then dedicates the memorial to the "reputation" that his father had in the hears and minds of the townspeople.

== Cast ==
- Wild Bill Elliott as Red Ryder
- Robert Blake as Little Beaver
- Alice Fleming as The Duchess (Red's Aunt)
- Roy Barcroft as Hands Weber
- Helen Talbot as Sally Carter
- Jack McClendon as Tommy Haines
- Rex Lease as Henchman Whitey
- Tom Chatterton as Sheriff Iron Mike Haines
- Jack Kirk as Bill Bradley
- Nelson McDowell as Undertaker Henry Grimm
- Larry Olsen as Payne
- Dale Van Sickel as Henchman Baker
- Bud Geary as Henchman Betcha
- Budd Buster as Editor F. E Murphy.
- Roy Bucko as Miner (uncredited)
- Horace B. Carpenter as Mr. Hill (uncredited)
- Earl Dobbins as Henchman Jenkins (uncredited)
- Fred Howard as Henchman Bates (uncredited)
- Nolan Leary as Townsman (uncredited)
- LeRoy Mason as Street Voice (voice) (uncredited)
- Frank O'Connor as Art Carter (uncredited)
- Hal Price as Mine Watchman (uncredited)
- Tom Smith as Townsman (uncredited)
- William Steven as Payne - Miner (uncredited)
- Robert J. Wilke as Henchman (uncredited)

== Production ==
Lone Texas Ranger (1945) was based on the characters created in Fred Harman's comic strip, Red Ryder.

The film was premiered in Los Angeles on May 20, 1945 and then opened June 11, 1945. The film was later re-released on July 22, 1949.

=== Stunts ===
- Bud Geary
- Tom Steele
- Dale Van Sickel
- Henry Wills
