= The San Antonio Kid =

1944 film by Howard Bretherton

- Theatrical release poster
- Directed by: Howard Bretherton
- Written by: Norman S. Hall (original screenplay); Fred Harman (characters)
- Produced by: Stephen Auer (associate producer)
- Starring: Wild Bill Elliott
- Cinematography: William Bradford
- Edited by: Tony Martinelli
- Music by: Joseph Dubin
- Production company: Republic Pictures
- Distributed by: Republic Pictures
- Release date: August 16, 1944 (United States)
- Running time: 53 minutes; 59 minutes
- Country: United States
- Language: English

The San Antonio Kid is a 1944 American Western film directed by Howard Bretherton starring Wild Bill Elliott in the role of Red Ryder. It was the fourth of twenty-three Red Ryder feature films that would be produced by Republic Pictures and the first shot without George "Gabby" Hayes who had starred with Elliott since he relocated to Republic Pictures. The picture was shot on the studio's back lot along with outdoor locations at Iverson Ranch, 1 Iverson Lane, Chatsworth, Los Angeles, CA, USA.

== Plot ==
A geologist, Walter Garfield (LeRoy Mason, discovers oil on land owned by Ben Taylor (Jack Kirk). Believing that the deposits extend to the surrounding ranches as well, Garfield wires his company that oil may be present and then teams up with Red Ryder’s arch enemy, Ace Hanlon (Glenn Strange) . Hanlon, the local saloon owner and his gang instigate a wave of terror against the ranchers hoping to drive the ranchers away, buy their land cheaply and make a fortune selling it to Metropolitan Oil Company for whom Garfield works.

Taylor is killed and his closest neighbors, the Duchess (Alice Fleming), her nephew, Red Ryder (Wild Bill Elliott), and his Indian ward, Little Beaver (Robert Blake), look after Ann Taylor (Linda Stirling). Red doesn’t believe that the attacks are the work of ordinary outlaws but fearing that the Duchess’ ranch will be next, Red and his foreman Happy Jack (Earle Hodgins) confront Hanlon. After Red overwhelms Hanlon in a fistfight, Hanlon decides to have Red killed and sends for Johnny Bennett, an old friend who is known as The San Antonio Kid (Duncan Renaldo). As Bennett nears the town of Maverick, the "Kid" has a freak accident nearly costing him his life but is saved by Red Ryder. When the "Kid" meets with Ace Hanlon he learns that Red Ryder is the man he has been paid to kill.

Johnny refuses Hanlon's offer until Hanlon asserts that he will have Red killed anyway. Johnny informs Red of the situation, and the two lay a trap for Hanlon. Johnny distracts Garfield and Hanlon with a poker game while Red searches Hanlon's office where he finds proof of the oil discovery and Hanlon's partnership with Garfield.

Red Ryder arranges for a confrontation with Ace Hanlon but when Johnny fails to kill Red as ordered, one of Hanlon's men shoots him. Johnny is only wounded, however, and helps Red, Happy Jack and Little Beaver as they engage in a shootout with the gang. Ryder chases Garfield and Hanlon to a series of nearby caves, where a fight breaks out and one of the oil pools is set on fire. Garfield is killed by the blaze, and the gang is rounded up. Later, Red, Little Beaver and Happy Jack ride off in search of another adventure, and Johnny promises to look after the Duchess and Ann.

== Cast ==
- Wild Bill Elliott as Red Ryder
- Robert Blake as Little Beaver
- Alice Fleming as The Duchess (Red's Aunt)
- Linda Stirling as Ann Taylor
- Earle Hodgins as Happy Jack
- Glenn Strange as [Ace Hanlon
- LeRoy Mason as Walter Garfield
- Duncan Renaldo as Johnny Bennett aka San Antonio Kid
- Tom London as Henchman Long
- Jack Kirk as Ben Taylor
- Robert J. Wilke as Henchman
- Cliff Parkinson as Henchman Ed
- Jack O'Shea as Bartender Nick
- Roy Bucko as Barfly (uncredited)
- Joe Garcio as Henchman (uncredited)
- Bud Geary as Henchman (uncredited)
- Herman Hack as Henchman (uncredited)
- Lew Morphy as Barfly (uncredited)
- Herman Nowlin as Barfly (uncredited)
- Pascale Perry as Barfly (uncredited)
- Tom Steele as Gunman (uncredited)
- Tex Terry as Barfly (uncredited)
- Henry Wills as Henchman (uncredited)
- Bob Woodward as Henchman (uncredited)

== Production ==
San Antonio Kid was based on the characters created in Fred Harman’s comic strip, Red Ryder. The film was released August 16, 1944 and re-released again in 1949.

=== Stunts ===
- Yakima Canutt
- Bud Geary
- Cliff Lyons
- Tom Steele
- Henry Wills
- Bob Woodward
