= Marshal of Laredo =

1945 film by R. G. Springsteen

- Film Poster for Marshal of Laredo (1945)
- Directed by: R.G. Springsteen
- Written by: Robert Creighton Williams (screenplay); Fred Harman (based upon characters created in the comic strip)
- Produced by: Louis Gray
- Starring: Wild Bill Elliott
- Cinematography: Bud Thackery
- Edited by: Charles Craft
- Music by: Richard Cherwin
- Distributed by: Republic Pictures
- Release date: 1945
- Running time: 66 minutes (original run time)
- Country: United States
- Language: English

Marshal of Laredo is a 1945 American Western film directed by R.G. Springsteen in his first feature film starring Wild Bill Elliott in the role of Red Ryder and costarring as Little Beaver, actor (Bobby) Robert Blake. It was the eleventh of twenty-three Red Ryder feature films that would be produced by Republic Pictures. The picture was shot on the studio's back lot along with outdoor locations at Iverson Ranch in Chatsworth, Los Angeles, CA, US.

== Plot ==
Oh his first day as Marshal of Larado, Red Ryder (Wild Bill Elliott) and his Indian ward, Little Beaver (Robert Blake) are summoned to duty when the town's bank courier Barton (Tom London) is robbed. However, Barton is able to fire his weapon and the fleeing robber whom he recognizes as Ferguson (Bud Geary) who tosses the money he's stolen into a water trough where it is latter collected by his crime partner, Pretty Boy Murphy (Don Costello). Red captures Ferguson, however Murphy delivers the stolen cash to the head of the gang, saloon owner, Denver Jack (Roy Barcroft).

Denver Jack plans to use a photograph that he took of Ferguson robbing the bank in order to maintain control over Ferguson, less he talk and confess all to the Marshal of Laredo. Jack has maintained similar evidence on all of his men and considers Ferguson as no different.

Denver Jack's continuing threat of matches around Pretty Boy Murphy, horribly scarred from a fire, continually terrorizes the henchman, demonstrating the cold cruelty of the gang-boss. Denver contacts his lawyer, Larry Randall (Jack McClendon), who tells him that if the courier fails to identify Ferguson, the gunman must be released. Denver Jack sends Pretty Boy to work Barton over and thus frighten the courier into keeping quiet. Barton refuses to identify the gangster and Red is compelled to release Ferguson. Randall is dismayed by Denver's methods and Larry's fiancée, Judy Bowers (Peggy Stewart), becomes furious that he is working for such a bad person as Denver Jack. Judy's father, the banker Mel Bowers is angry as well and orders Larry to never see his daughter again.

Randall wants to win Judy back and so breaks his ties with Denver Jack and recovers the stolen money, which is returned to the banks. Larry expresses his regrets for working with Jack and says that it is over. Bowers agrees to allow Larry to continue to see his daughter provided that he continues to honor his words and remain straight for six months. However, as they are talking, Bowers is gunned downed by Pretty Boy and Larry is arrested for murder.

Laredo's Dr. Allen (Wheaton Chambers) tells Red Ryder that he was present at the beginning of Randal and Bowers' conversation, and that he saw Larry kill the father. Larry is puzzled by Dr. Allen's statement because the doctor had left before the shooting. Suddenly, he comes to the realization that Denver Jack must also be blackmailing Allen.

Denver Jack approaches Larry Randal at a later time and promises that he will get Randal released from jail if he promises to continue to work for him. Randal refuses and so later, it is Dr. Allen's testimony that results in a conviction. In the meantime, Red Ryder has become increasingly more suspicious of Denver Jack and arranges for Larry to break out of jail. He follows Randall to Allen's office where Larry confronts the doctor who confesses that he is being blackmailed by Denver Jack. Overhearing the admission, Red bursts into the room and orders Allen to write a confession. Unfortunately, before the doctor can finish the letter, he is shot dead by Pretty Boy, who fires through a window.

Denver Jack complains loudly to the locals that Red Ryder is in league with Larry Randall and works to stir up the gathering crowd against the Marshal. As the rowdy crowd closes in, Red, Larry and Little Beaver manage to get away. Later that evening, Red returns to Denver Jack's office and discovers Jack's blackmail material. Denver Jack and Pretty Boy Murphy capture Red and trap Little Beaver when Larry tries to escape. To protect the Indian boy, Larry allows himself to be returned to jail, now guarded over by Pretty Boy. Read starts a fire and escapes but not before forcing Pretty Boy to confess to the killings of Bowers and Allen.

Red manages to stop Larry's hanging just it time and stops Denver Jack. With Larry's name cleared and the criminals arrested, Red, Little Beaver and Red's aunt, The Duchess (Alice Fleming), watch cheerfully as Larry Randall is once again back together again with Judy Barton.

== Cast ==
- Wild Bill Elliott as Red Ryder
- Robert Blake as Little Beaver
- Alice Fleming as The Duchess (Red's Aunt)
- Peggy Stewart as Judy Bowers
- Jack McClendon as Larry Randall (as Robert Grady)
- Roy Barcroft as Denver Jack
- Don Costello as Henchman Pretty Boy Murphy
- Bud Geary as Henchman Ferguson
- Sarah Padden as Mrs. Randall
- Tom London as Barton
- Tom Chatterton as Reverend Parker
- Wheaton Chambers as Dr. Allen
- George Chesebro as Chief Deputy
- George M. Carleton as Mel Bowers (as George Carleton)
- Melva Anstead as Saloon Girl (uncredited)
- Mary Arden as Saloon Girl (uncredited)
- Lane Bradford as Stage Guard (uncredited)
- Tommy Coats as Gambler (uncredited)
- Dorothy Granger as Suzanne (uncredited)
- Jack Kirk as Townsman (uncredited)
- Rose Marie Morel as Saloon Girl (uncredited)
- Jack O'Shea as Gambler Spud (uncredited)
- Dick Scott as Croupier (uncredited)
- Ken Terrell as Henchman (uncredited)

== Production ==
Marshal of Laredo (1945) was based on the characters created in Fred Harman's comic strip, Red Ryder. The film premiered in Los Angeles on October 7, 1945. It was later re-released on November 3, 1949.

=== Stunts ===
- Bud Geary
- Tom Steele
- Ken Terrell
