= Fred Graham (actor) =

American actor (1908–1979)

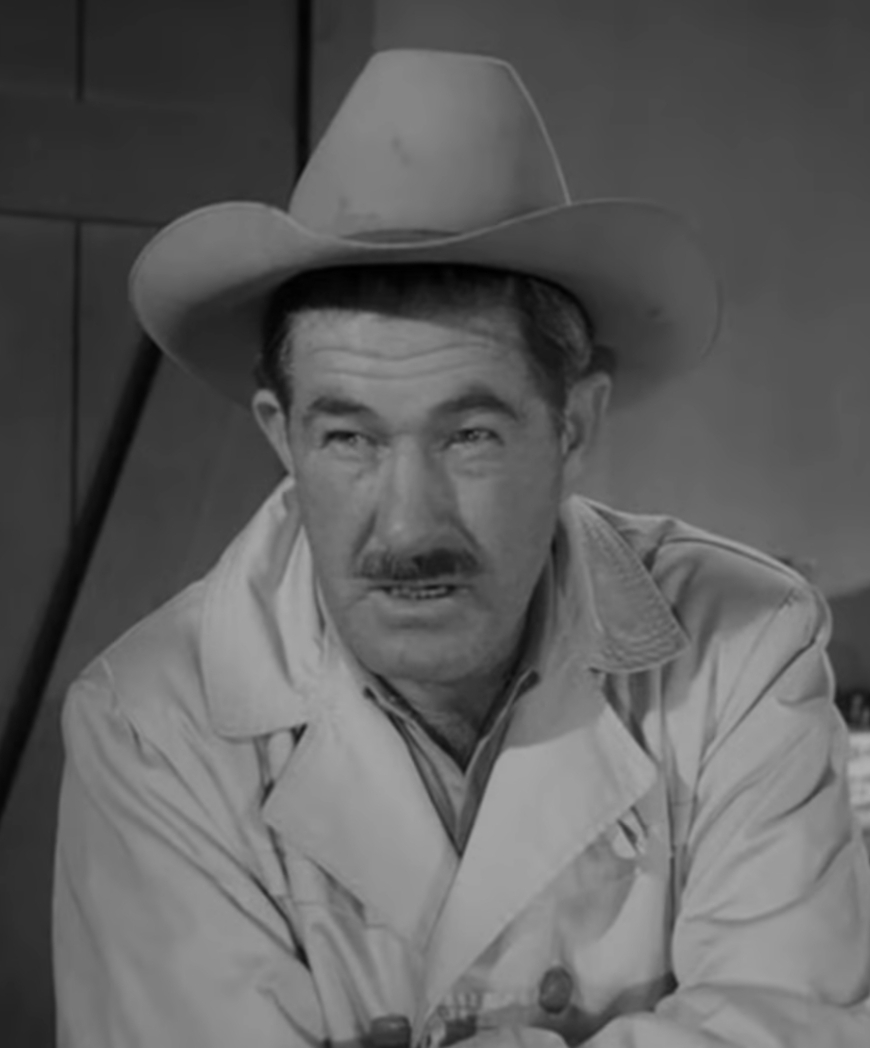
- Graham in The Giant Gila Monster (1959)
- Born: October 26, 1908; Springer, New Mexico, U.S.
- Died: October 10, 1979 (aged 70); Scottsdale, Arizona, U.S.
- Resting place: Green Acres Memorial Park, Scottsdale, Arizona
- Occupations: Actor, stuntman
- Years active: 1934–1973
- Children: 2

Fred Graham (October 26, 1908 – October 10, 1979) was an American actor and stuntman who performed in films from the 1930s to the 1970s.

== Early life ==
Graham was a semiprofessional baseball player. Graham entered the film business in 1928. He was a charter member of the Screen Actors Guild. He appeared in Mutiny on the Bounty (1935).

== Career ==
He broke his ankle while working as Basil Rathbone's stunt double on The Adventures of Robin Hood (1938).

Graham coordinated stunts of John Wayne, with whom he made 26 films; Errol Flynn; and Ward Bond.

He played small roles in two Alfred Hitchcock films, notably Vertigo, as the Police Officer who falls to his death in its famous opening scene while trying to help James Stewart. He continued working in films until the 1970s.

Graham moved to Arizona in 1963. He was in charge of the Arizona Governor's Office for Motion Picture Development and was vice president and general manager of CineLogistics, part of Southwest Research and Development, which operated the Graham Studios of Carefree, Arizona.

== Personal life and death ==
He had a wife, son, and daughter. He is interred at Green Acres Memorial Park in Scottsdale.

== Selected filmography ==
- Death on the Diamond (1934) – Cardinal Player (uncredited)
- Murder in the Fleet (1935) – Crewman (uncredited)
- Mutiny on the Bounty (1935) – Able-Bodied Seaman (uncredited)
- Rose Marie (1936) – Corporal (uncredited)
- Romeo and Juliet (1936) – Capulet Guard-Escort (uncredited)
- Libeled Lady (1936) – Press Man (uncredited)
- After the Thin Man (1936) – Newspaper Distributor (uncredited)
- Maytime (1937) – Court Servant (uncredited)
- The Last Gangster (1937) – Newspaper Hopper on Truck (uncredited)
- The Shopworn Angel (1938) – Soldier Watching Wrestling Match (uncredited)
- Give Me a Sailor (1938) – Delivery Man (uncredited)
- The Storm (1938) – Sailor (uncredited)
- The Dawn Patrol (1938) – Running Man on Airfield (uncredited)
- Dodge City (1939) – Al (uncredited)
- Confessions of a Nazi Spy (1939) – American Legionnaire at Bund Meeting (uncredited)
- Each Dawn I Die (1939) – Guard in Cell (uncredited)
- Smashing the Money Ring (1939) – Convict Pushed into Brawl (uncredited)
- The Roaring Twenties (1939) – Henchman Eddie Pushes Over Railing (uncredited)
- Santa Fe Marshal (1940) – Henchman (uncredited)
- New Moon (1940) – Bondsman (uncredited)
- Winners of the West (1940, Serial) – Townsman (uncredited)
- The Golden Fleecing (1940) – Taxi Driver (uncredited)
- East of the River (1940) – Slugged Policeman (uncredited)
- Las Vegas Nights (1941) – Cowboy (uncredited)
- Affectionately Yours (1941) (uncredited)
- Caught in the Draft (1941) – Blue Army Soldier Slugged by Don (uncredited)
- Highway West (1941) – Bus Driver (uncredited)
- Manpower (1941) – Lineman at Cafe Counter (uncredited)
- Parachute Battalion (1941) – Cullins' Brother (uncredited)
- Navy Blues (1941) – Tough Sailor (uncredited)
- Shadow of the Thin Man (1941) – Waiter with Steak (uncredited)
- The Fleet's In (1942) – Sailor (uncredited)
- Reap the Wild Wind (1942) – Jake (uncredited)
- Larceny, Inc. (1942) – Cop (uncredited)
- My Favorite Spy (1942) – Jones, Undercover Marine (uncredited)
- Wake Island (1942) – First Civilian (uncredited)
- Sherlock Holmes and the Voice of Terror (1942) – Meade's Henchman (uncredited)
- Panama Hattie (1942) – Patrolman (uncredited)
- Lady Bodyguard (1943) – Attendant (uncredited)
- They Got Me Covered (1943) – FBI Agent Arresting Nichimuro (uncredited)
- Don Winslow of the Coast Guard (1943, Serial) – Henchman (uncredited)
- Pilot#5 (1943) – Governor's Receptionist (uncredited)
- The Masked Marvel (1943, Serial) – Janson / Hart / Pete (uncredited)
- The Man from Down Under (1943) – Military Policeman (uncredited)
- The Lone Star Trail (1943) – Henchman (uncredited)
- A Lady Takes a Chance (1943) – Saloon Brawler (uncredited)
- Guadalcanal Diary (1943) – Marine Listening to Baseball Game on Radio (uncredited)
- In Old Oklahoma (1943) – Gardner's Man (uncredited)
- Captain America (1944, Serial) – Agent B-10 [Chs. 4, 8–9] / Farm Thug [Chs. 14–15] (uncredited)
- Passage to Marseille (1944) – Thug Wrecking Newspaper Office (uncredited)
- See Here, Private Hargrove (1944) – Soldier (uncredited)
- Mojave Firebrand (1944) – Frank Brady, Miner (uncredited)
- Outlaws of Santa Fe (1944) – Saloon Brawler (uncredited)
- Buffalo Bill (1944) – Editor (uncredited)
- Tucson Raiders (1944) – Henchman (uncredited)
- The Tiger Woman (1944) – Goff, Thug with Dynamite [Ch. 2] / Cave Guard [Ch. 4] / Truck Driver in Cafe [Ch. 6] / Heavy with Travis [Ch. 10] / Heavy in Cafe [Ch. 12] (uncredited)
- Silent Partner (1944) – Harden (uncredited)
- The Yellow Rose of Texas (1944) – Henchman (uncredited)
- The Hairy Ape (1944) – Saloon Brawler (uncredited)
- Marshal of Reno (1944) – Drake, Henchman
- Louisiana Hayride (1944) – Testing Director (scenes deleted)
- Silver City Kid (1944) – Henchman in Ballard's Office (uncredited)
- Abroad with Two Yanks (1944) – Soldier Who Gets Punched (uncredited)
- U-Boat Prisoner (1944) – American Lieutenant (uncredited)
- Haunted Harbor (1944, Serial) – Mine Thug [Chs. 3, 15] / 2nd Bartender [Chs. 6–7] (uncredited)
- Stagecoach to Monterey (1944) – Mac – Henchman
- The Woman in the Window (1944) – Motorcycle Cop (uncredited)
- Zorro's Black Whip (1944) – Henchman Black (uncredited)
- Murder, My Sweet (1944) – Minor Role (uncredited)
- The Big Bonanza (1944) – Tom's Brother, Burly Barroom Brawler (uncredited)
- The Topeka Terror (1945) – Nick – Croupier (uncredited)
- Great Stagecoach Robbery (1945) – Bank Brawler (uncredited)
- Manhunt of Mystery Island (1945, Serial) – Blake, Thug B-6 in Winery [Ch. 4] (uncredited)
- Santa Fe Saddlemates (1945) – Burke's 1st Guard (uncredited)
- Nob Hill (1945) – Bouncer (uncredited)
- Federal Operator 99 (1945) – Hinds (uncredited)
- Within These Walls (1945) – Guard
- Code of the Lawless (1945) – Rancher (uncredited)
- The Purple Monster Strikes (1945) – Baker / Curry / Ed Fletcher / Logan / Lab Thug (uncredited)
- Phantom of the Plains (1945) – Chuck, Henchman
- Bandits of the Badlands (1945) – Duke Lee, Henchman
- Dakota (1945) – Bouncer (uncredited)
- Colorado Pioneers (1945) – Chicago Hoodlum (uncredited)
- Road to Utopia (1945) – Henchman with Ace at Bar (uncredited)
- The Cherokee Flash (1945) – Tom Stanton
- The Phantom Rider (1946, Serial) – Harry (Ch's 3–4) (uncredited)
- Passkey to Danger (1946) – Bert
- Do You Love Me (1946) – Doorman (uncredited)
- Traffic in Crime (1946) – Henchman (uncredited)
- My Pal Trigger (1946) – Jenks (uncredited)
- Red River Renegades (1946) – Henchman (uncredited)
- Daughter of Don Q (1946, Serial) – Rollins, Killer [Ch. 6]
- The Inner Circle (1946) – Duke's Henchman
- The Strange Woman (1946) – Street Rowdy (uncredited)
- The Crimson Ghost (1946, Serial) – Snyder [Chs. 1–2] / Zane [Ch. 8]
- The Razor's Edge (1946) – Corsican Joining Fistfight (uncredited)
- Out California Way (1946) – Ace Hanlon
- The Falcon's Adventure (1946) – Joe, Police Driver (uncredited)
- Son of Zorro (1947, Serial) – Quirt, Henchman [Ch. 4]
- The Sea of Grass (1947) – Poker Game Spectator (uncredited)
- The Michigan Kid (1947) – Brawler (uncredited)
- Bells of San Angelo (1947) – Mine Henchman Guarding Lee (uncredited)
- Buffalo Bill Rides Again (1947) – Jackson, Rancher (uncredited)
- The Vigilantes Return (1947) – Stage Driver (uncredited)
- The Trespasser (1947) – Davis
- They Won't Believe Me (1947) – Deputy Sheriff (uncredited)
- Jesse James Rides Again (1947, Serial) – Hawks, Henchman [Chs. 6–8]
- On the Old Spanish Trail (1947) – Marcos, Henchman
- Brick Bradford (1947, Serial) – Black
- Slippy McGee (1948) – Truck Driver (uncredited)
- The Miracle of the Bells (1948) – Man (uncredited)
- Fort Apache (1948) – Cavalryman (uncredited)
- The Bold Frontiersman (1948) – Smokey, Henchman
- The Timber Trail (1948) – Frank, Henchman
- The Street with No Name (1948) – Bank Clerk (uncredited)
- They Live by Night (1948) – Motorcycle Cop (uncredited)
- Son of God's Country (1948) – Hagen, Henchman
- The Untamed Breed (1948) – Cowhand (uncredited)
- Congo Bill (1948, Serial) – Villabo
- Adventures of Frank and Jesse James (1948, Serial) – Bank Robber [Ch. 1] (uncredited)
- Adventures of Don Juan (1948) – Pressgang Sergeant (uncredited)
- Wake of the Red Witch (1948) – Sailor in Fight (uncredited)
- The Man from Colorado (1948) – Parks (uncredited)
- Tulsa (1949) – Charlie – Cherokee's Foreman (uncredited)
- She Wore a Yellow Ribbon (1949) – Sergeant Hench
- The Fighting Kentuckian (1949) – Carter Ward
- Trapped (1949) – Patrol Car Cop Outside Nightclub (uncredited)
- The Woman on Pier 13 (1949) – Grip Wilson
- Border Incident (1949) – Leathercoat with Motorcycle (uncredited)
- Port of New York (1949) – New York City Detective (uncredited)
- Sands of Iwo Jima (1949) – Officer (uncredited)
- Samson and Delilah (1949) – Priest (uncredited)
- When Willie Comes Marching Home (1950) – Male Nurse in Hospital Corridor (uncredited)
- Buccaneer's Girl (1950) – Barfly (uncredited)
- The Asphalt Jungle (1950) – Truck Driver (uncredited)
- The Great Jewel Robber (1950) – Brad Morrow, Bartender (uncredited)
- No Way Out (1950) – Wilson (uncredited)
- Convicted (1950) – Guard in Laundry (uncredited)
- The Fuller Brush Girl (1950) – Rocky Mitchell
- Mister 880 (1950) – Man Slugged by Steve in Prologue Montage (uncredited)
- Dallas (1950) – Tough in Saloon (uncredited)
- Valentino (1951) – Chef (uncredited)
- Heart of the Rockies (1951) – Devery
- Lorna Doone (1951) – Outrider (uncredited)
- Flying Leathernecks (1951) – Military Police Sergeant (uncredited)
- The Strip (1951) – Detective (uncredited)
- Angels in the Outfield (1951) – Chunk (coach)
- Across the Wide Missouri (1951) – Brown (uncredited)
- Close to My Heart (1951) – Prison Guard (uncredited)
- Overland Telegraph (1951) – Joe, Henchman
- Colorado Sundown (1952) – Daniel Hurley
- This Woman Is Dangerous (1952) – Highway Patrolman (uncredited)
- Fort Osage (1952) – Henchman Logan (uncredited)
- Rancho Notorious (1952) – Ace Maguire (uncredited)
- The Pride of St. Louis (1952) – Tommy Alexander (uncredited)
- The San Francisco Story (1952) – Scud (uncredited)
- Denver and Rio Grande (1952) – Railroad Worker (uncredited)
- The Sellout (1952) – Police Desk Clerk (uncredited)
- Brave Warrior (1952) – Man in Canoe Fight (uncredited)
- Scarlet Angel (1952) – Cass Walters (uncredited)
- Dreamboat (1952) – Bartender (uncredited)
- Old Oklahoma Plains (1952) – Cameron, Henchman
- The Big Sky (1952) – Sam Eggelston (uncredited)
- The Silver Whip (1953) – Freighter (uncredited)
- Kansas Pacific (1953) – Corvin (uncredited)
- The War of the Worlds (1953) – Looter (uncredited)
- Trouble Along the Way (1953) – Bill Sackheim (uncredited)
- A Perilous Journey (1953) – Whiskers
- Code Two (1953) – Motor Squad Duty Sergeant Payne
- Split Second (1953) – Air Force Captain in Helicopter (uncredited)
- The Farmer Takes a Wife (1953) – Brawling Railroader (uncredited)
- Affair with a Stranger (1953) – Mounted Policeman (scenes deleted)
- Canadian Mounties vs. Atomic Invaders (1953, Serial) – Mason, Henchman [Ch.1–2, 10] (uncredited)
- The Golden Blade (1953) – Sergeant (uncredited)
- Escape from Fort Bravo (1953) – Jones (uncredited)
- Trader Tom of the China Seas (1954, Serial) – Kurt Daley
- Overland Pacific (1954) – Jenks, Stage Driver
- Witness to Murder (1954) – Plainclothes Man (uncredited)
- Demetrius and the Gladiators (1954) – The Decurion (uncredited)
- 20,000 Leagues Under the Sea (1954) – Casey Moore (uncredited)
- Rear Window (1954) – Detective (uncredited)
- Ricochet Romance (1954) – Policeman (uncredited)
- Panther Girl of the Kongo (1955) – Nick Burgass [Ch. 7] (uncredited)
- The Road to Denver (1955) – Constable (uncredited)
- The Vanishing American (1955) – Walker's Deputy (uncredited)
- Perils of the Wilderness (1956, Serial) – Henchman (uncredited)
- The Conqueror (1956) – Subuya, Mongol Warrior (uncredited)
- Backlash (1956) – Ned McCloud
- The Steel Jungle (1956) – Second Detective
- The Last Hunt (1956) – Bartender
- Seven Men from Now (1956) – Henchman #1
- Thunder Over Arizona (1956) – Chalky (uncredited)
- Accused of Murder (1956) – Policeman (uncredited)
- The Wings of Eagles (1957) – Officer in Brawl (uncredited)
- The Restless Breed (1957) – Henchman (uncredited)
- Jet Pilot (1957) – Sergeant (uncredited)
- Domino Kid (1957) – Haimes, killed in a gunfight with Domino Kid in the opening scene of the movie (uncredited)
- Man in the Shadow (1957) – Empire Ranch Guard (uncredited)
- Return to Warbow (1958) – Tom, Wagon Driving Guard (uncredited)
- Vertigo (1958) – Scottie's police partner (uncredited)
- Badman's Country (1958) – Blackjack Ketchum (uncredited)
- Rio Bravo (1959) – 2nd Burdette Man in Shootout (uncredited)
- These Thousand Hills (1959) – Brice (uncredited)
- Woman Obsessed (1959) – Officer Follette (uncredited)
- The Horse Soldiers (1959) – Union Soldier (uncredited)
- The Giant Gila Monster (1959) – Sheriff Jeff
- Seven Ways from Sundown (1960) – Chief Waggoner
- The Alamo (1960) – Bearded Volunteer (uncredited)
- North to Alaska (1960) – Ole (uncredited)
- A Fever in the Blood (1961) – State Police Sergeant (uncredited)
- Rawhide (1961) – Shannon in S3:E15, "Incident of the Fish Out of Water"
- Arizona Raiders (1965) – Quantrell
- Man and Boy (1971) – Blockers
- Pocket Money (1972) – Uncle Herb
- Guns of a Stranger (1973) – Sheriff Stoner (final film role)

== Television ==
Year	Title	Role	Notes
1957	Alfred Hitchcock Presents	Rinditch	Season 3 Episode 12: "Miss Paisley's Cat"
1959	Rawhide	The Bartender	S1:E4, "Incident of the Widowed Dove"
1960	Perry Mason	Fire Chief	S4:E2, "Case of the Credulous Quarry"
1961	Rawhide	Shannon	S3:E15, "Incident of the Fish Out of Water"
1961	Rawhide	Bartender	S4:E7, "The Black Sheep"
