= Kenne Duncan =

Canadian-American actor (1903–1972)

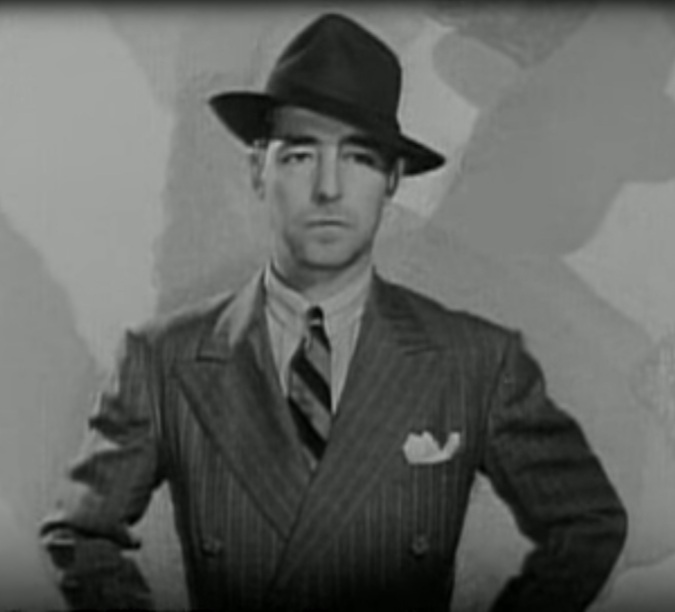
- Duncan in Adventures of Captain Marvel (1941)
- Born: Kenneth Duncan MacLachlan; February 17, 1903; Chatham, Ontario, Canada
- Died: February 5, 1972 (aged 68); Hollywood, Los Angeles, California, U.S.
- Resting place: Grand View Memorial Park Cemetery, Glendale, California
- Other names: Ken Dincan; Kenneth Duncan
- Occupation: Actor
- Years active: 1928–1962

Kenne Duncan (February 17, 1903 – February 5, 1972) was a Canadian-born American B-movie character actor with more than 250 screen credits. Hyped professionally as the "Meanest Man in the Movies", the vast majority of his film appearances were Westerns, but he also acted in some horror, crime-drama and science-fiction films. He also appeared in several serials.

== Early years ==
Duncan was born Kenneth Duncan MacLachlan in Chatham, Ontario, Canada.

Before he became an actor, Duncan enjoyed riding, and for a time worked as a jockey. His racing accomplishments included winning the steeplechase at the Blue Bonnets raceway in Montreal.

== Career ==
Duncan may be best known for his work with Ed Wood. Duncan appeared in five Wood productions: Night of the Ghouls, Trick Shooting with Kenne Duncan, Crossroad Avenger, The Sinister Urge and The Lawless Rider, a film that Wood wrote and produced but with Yakima Canutt as the director. Duncan's final appearances on screen were Wood's low-budget The Sinister Urge and a bit part in an episode of Rawhide ("Incident of the Sharpshooter"). He also made television appearances, especially Westerns, such as The Cisco Kid, Bat Masterson, The Life and Legend of Wyatt Earp and Tombstone Territory. He retired from filmmaking in 1961 at age 58.

Duncan had a reputation as a womanizer with his female costars. Actress Valda Hansen remarked: "Kenne Duncan kept whispering obscene things in my ear, over and over between takes, such as 'Do you like tongues?' ... Finally I had had enough of the old wolf, so I screamed over the mikes on the set 'Oh, shut up!' ... and everyone cracked up." Filmmaker Ron Ashcroft recalled: "Kenne had a book, and it was quite thick, of the women that he had in bed. He said there was over a thousand in there. A thousand women."

== Death ==
On February 5, 1972, Duncan committed suicide by overdosing on barbiturates twelve days before his 69th birthday. His friend Ron Ashcroft recalled: "When he committed suicide, I couldn't believe it. He was tired of living. Just like George Sanders, he had seen everything, done everything. All he did was sit around and watch television." Duncan is interred at Grand View Memorial Park Cemetery in Glendale, California.

Wood was named the executor of Duncan's estate, and he held a small memorial funeral in his backyard around the swimming pool. Wood and his wife and friends took turns walking onto the diving board, where each of them would deliver a brief eulogy.

== Legacy ==
Duncan was inducted into the Chatham-Kent Cultural Hall of Fame in October, 2026.

== Selected filmography ==
- Police Reporter (1928)
- A Man from Wyoming (1930) - Haley (uncredited)
- Derelict (1930) - Radio Man (uncredited)
- No Limit (1931) - Curly Andrews
- Grief Street (1931) - Newspaper Reporter (uncredited)
- Lovers Courageous (1932) - Cowboy (uncredited)
- Probation (1932) - Wedding Rehearsal Attendant (uncredited)
- The Mouthpiece (1932) - Office Worker (uncredited)
- Shadow River (1933)
- Undercover Men (1934) - Blake Hardy
- Gallant Defender (1935) - Goose Neck Smith (uncredited)
- From Nine to Nine (1936) - John Sommerset
- Thoroughbred (1936) - Chick Williams
- Cross My Heart (1937) - Steve King
- Make-Up (1937) - Lorenzo
- The Last Curtain (1937) - Garsatti
- The Colorado Kid (1937) - Sims Leather
- Flash Gordon's Trip to Mars (1938, Serial) - Airdrome Captain
- The Great Adventures of Wild Bill Hickok (1938, Serial) - Blacksmith (Ch.13) (uncredited)
- Frontier Scout (1938) - Crandall - Henchman
- The Spider's Web (1938, Serial) - Ram Singh
- Fighting Thoroughbreds (1939) - Brady
- North of the Yukon (1939) - Henchman Meeker
- Buck Rogers (1939, Serial) - Lieutenant Lacy
- Man from Texas (1939) - Speed Dennison
- Mickey the Kid (1939) - Henchman (uncredited)
- Overland with Kit Carson (1939, Serial) - Trapper (uncredited)
- The Fighting Renegade (1939) - Henchman (uncredited)
- Trigger Fingers (1939) - Henchman Johnson
- Flaming Lead (1939) - Larry - Ranch Hand
- Westbound Stage (1939) - Capt. Jim Wallace
- Emergency Squad (1940) - Jack (uncredited)
- Texas Renegades (1940) - Bill Willis
- The Sagebrush Family Trails West (1940) - Bart Wallace
- The Cheyenne Kid (1940) - Chet Adams
- Billy the Kid Outlawed (1940) - David Hendricks
- Murder on the Yukon (1940) - Tom - Henchman
- Covered Wagon Trails (1940) - Henchman Blaine
- Pinto Canyon (1940) - Fred Jones
- Land of the Six Guns (1940) - Max
- I Take This Oath (1940) - Car-Rental Clerk (uncredited)
- The Kid from Santa Fe (1940) - Joe Lavida
- Frontier Crusader (1940) - The Mesa Kid
- Sky Bandits (1940) - Brownie - Henchman
- Deadwood Dick (1940, Serial) - Two-Gun - Henchman (Ch. 7) (uncredited)
- Billy the Kid Outlawed (1940) - Dave Hendricks
- Roll Wagons Roll (1940) - Captain Clay
- Arizona Gang Busters (1940) - Sheriff Dan Kirk
- Trailing Double Trouble (1940) - Bob Horner
- The Green Archer (1940, Serial) - Michael Bellamy (uncredited)
- Billy the Kid's Gun Justice (1940) - Henchman Bragg
- Souls in Pawn (1940) - J.W. Carlton
- Buck Privates (1941) - Sergeant on Sidewalk with Sgt. Collins (uncredited)
- White Eagle (1941, Serial) - Kirk (uncredited)
- Outlaws of the Rio Grande (1941) - Marshal Bob Day
- Adventures of Captain Marvel (1941) - Barnett - Chief Henchman [Ch. 2-10]
- The Spider Returns (1941, Serial) - Ram Singh, Wentworth's Hindu Chauffeur
- Billy the Kid in Santa Fe (1941) - Henchman Scotty
- The Texas Marshal (1941) - Henchman Lefty (uncredited)
- The Deadly Game (1941) - Henchman #2
- Dynamite Canyon (1941) - Henchman Rod
- The Apache Kid (1941) - Henchman Benton (uncredited)
- King of the Texas Rangers (1941, Serial) - Nick - Henchman [Chs. 1–4,6-9]
- Billy the Kid Wanted (1941) - Henchman (uncredited)
- Riding the Sunset Trail (1941) - Jay Lynch
- The Lone Rider Fights Back (1941) - Barfly (uncredited)
- A Missouri Outlaw (1941) - Henchman Pete Chandler
- Billy the Kid's Round-Up (1941) - Henchman Joe (uncredited)
- Texas Man Hunt (1942) - Henchman Lake
- The Lone Rider and the Bandit (1942) - Saloon Henchman (uncredited)
- Code of the Outlaw (1942) - Plug - Henchman
- Raiders of the West (1942) - Harris - Dandy Gambler (uncredited)
- Heart of the Rio Grande (1942) - Train Passenger (uncredited)
- The Man with Two Lives (1942) - Jess Fowler
- The Lone Rider in Cheyenne (1942) - Deputy Walt
- Westward Ho (1942) - Henchman Dallas (uncredited)
- Perils of Nyoka (1942, serial) - Abu
- The Sombrero Kid (1942) - Pete Raymond - Henchman (uncredited)
- Law and Order (1942) - Henchman Durgan
- The Secret Code (1942, Serial) - Marvin [Chs.1-3,5-6]
- Isle of Missing Men (1942) - Bob Henderson
- Foreign Agent (1942) - Tom, Federal Agent (uncredited)
- Overland Stagecoach (1942) - Posse Rider (uncredited)
- Texas to Bataan (1942) - Captain Anders
- Valley of Hunted Men (1942) - Nazi (uncredited)
- Outlaws of Boulder Pass (1942) - Henchman Mulie
- Red River Robin Hood (1942) - Henchman Ed Rance
- Trail Riders (1942) - Marshal Frank Hammond
- The Valley of Vanishing Men (1942, Serial) - Logan (uncredited)
- The Sundown Kid (1942) - Henchman
- The Kid Rides Again (1943) - Cowboy in Saloon (uncredited)
- Cheyenne Roundup (1943) - Express Rider (uncredited)
- Santa Fe Scouts (1943) - Hoodlum (uncredited)
- Wild Horse Stampede (1943) - Hanley
- Wolves of the Range (1943) - Henchman Adams
- Daredevils of the West (1943, Serial) - George Hooker [Ch. 9]
- Days of Old Cheyenne (1943) - Henchman Pete
- The Avenging Rider (1943) - Blackie
- Border Buckaroos (1943) - Tom Bancroft
- Wolves of the Range (1943) - Henchman Adams
- Fugitive of the Plains (1943) - R. J. Cole
- Batman (1943, Serial) - Fred - the Mechanic [Ch. 5-6] (uncredited)
- The Law Rides Again (1943) - Sheriff Jeff
- Wagon Tracks West (1943) - Henchman (uncredited)
- Blazing Frontier (1943) - Homesteader Clark (uncredited)
- Trail of Terror (1943) - Henchman Tom
- Swing Shift Maisie (1943) - Charlie - Ann's Blind Date (uncredited)
- Blazing Guns (1943) - Henchman Red Higgins
- The Man from the Rio Grande (1943) - Henchman
- Overland Mail Robbery (1943) - Hank (uncredited)
- Canyon City (1943) - Turner - Henchman (uncredited)
- In Old Oklahoma (1943) - Indignant Businessman on Train (uncredited)
- Pistol Packin' Mama (1943) - Doorman (uncredited)
- Raiders of Sunset Pass (1943) - Henchman Tex
- Pride of the Plains (1944) - Snyder - Henchman
- Hands Across the Border (1944) - Deputy (uncredited)
- The Fighting Seabees (1944) - Construction Worker (uncredited)
- Captain America (1944, Serial) - Ed Graham [Ch. 14] (uncredited)
- Beneath Western Skies (1944) - Deputy Barrow
- Mojave Firebrand (1944) - Tony Webb
- Hidden Valley Outlaws (1944) - Henchman Ben Bannon
- The Laramie Trail (1944) - Bud's Partner (uncredited)
- Outlaws of Santa Fe (1944) - Chuck - Henchman
- Tucson Raiders (1944) - Henchman (voice, uncredited)
- The Tiger Woman (1944, serial) - Gentry - Henchman [Chs. 7, 11]
- Silent Partner (1944) - Gangster (uncredited)
- Man from Frisco (1944) - Foreman (uncredited)
- Marshal of Reno (1944) - Adams - Henchman
- Secrets of Scotland Yard (1944) - Steward (uncredited)
- The Girl Who Dared (1944) - Dr. Paul Dexter
- Song of Nevada (1944) - Thompson's Wagon-Race Driver (uncredited)
- Haunted Harbor (1944, Serial) - Gregg
- Stagecoach to Monterey (1944) - Joe - Henchman
- San Fernando Valley (1944) - Horse Thief (uncredited)
- Cheyenne Wildcat (1944) - Henchman Pete
- My Buddy (1944) - Convict (uncredited)
- Storm Over Lisbon (1944) - Paul-Deresco Aide
- End of the Road (1944) - Al Herman
- Sheriff of Sundown (1944) - Arthur Wilkes - Secretary
- Vigilantes of Dodge City (1944) - Henchman Dave Brewster
- Brazil (1944) - Cab Driver (uncredited)
- Thoroughbreds (1944) - (uncredited)
- Sheriff of Las Vegas (1944) - Whitey - Henchman
- Manhunt of Mystery Island (1945, Serial) - Sidney Brand
- Corpus Christi Bandits (1945) - Spade - Henchman
- The Phantom Speaks (1945) - Murder Victim (uncredited)
- Flame of Barbary Coast (1945) - Gambler (uncredited)
- Santa Fe Saddlemates (1945) - Brazos Kane
- A Sporting Chance (1945) - Boarder
- Bells of Rosarita (1945) - Kidnapper (uncredited)
- The Chicago Kid (1945) - Al
- Road to Alcatraz (1945) - Servant
- Trail of Kit Carson (1945) - Trigger Chandler
- Oregon Trail (1945) - Johnny Slade - Henchman
- Hitchhike to Happiness (1945) - Man in Bar (uncredited)
- The Purple Monster Strikes (1945, Serial) - Charles Mitchell [Chs. 1–2, 10]
- Love, Honor and Goodbye (1945) - Counter Man (uncredited)
- Rough Riders of Cheyenne (1945) - Lance - Henchman
- Dakota (1945) - Henchman (uncredited)
- Wagon Wheels Westward (1945) - Henchman Joe
- The Scarlet Horseman (1946, Serial) - Henchman (uncredited)
- The Phantom Rider (1946, Serial) - Ben Brady - Henchman
- A Guy Could Change (1946) - Frank Hanlon
- California Gold Rush (1946) - Henchman Felton
- Sheriff of Redwood Valley (1946) - Henchman Jackson
- Home on the Range (1946) - Henchman #2
- Rainbow Over Texas (1946) - Henchman Pete McAvoy
- Sun Valley Cyclone (1946) - Dow
- In Old Sacramento (1946) - Deputy (uncredited)
- Man from Rainbow Valley (1946) - Tracy's Partner
- Traffic in Crime (1946) - Henchman (uncredited)
- My Pal Trigger (1946) - Croupier
- Night Train to Memphis (1946) - Asa Morgan
- Red River Renegades (1946) - Henchman Hackett
- Conquest of Cheyenne (1946) - Geologist McBride
- G.I. War Brides (1946) - (uncredited)
- The Mysterious Mr. Valentine (1946) - Sam Priestly
- Rio Grande Raiders (1946) - Steve - Henchman
- Roll on Texas Moon (1946) - Henchman Brannigan
- The Crimson Ghost (1946, Serial) - Dr. Chambers [Chs. 1–2, 8]
- Santa Fe Uprising (1946) - Henchman
- Sioux City Sue (1946) - Crawley (uncredited)
- Angel and the Badman (1947) - Gambler (uncredited)
- Twilight on the Rio Grande (1947) - Lou Evers - U.S. Customs Agent (uncredited)
- Buck Privates Come Home (1947) - Sergeant on Sidewalk (uncredited)
- The Trespasser (1947) - Fellow (uncredited)
- Close-Up (1948) - Detective (uncredited)
- Sundown in Santa Fe (1948) - Wagon Driver (uncredited)
- Hidden Danger (1948) - Henchman Bender
- Crashing Thru (1949) - Ranger Tim Reymond
- Shadows of the West (1949) - Bill Mayberry
- Gun Runner (1949) - Nebraska
- Law of the West (1949) - Frank Stevens
- Stampede (1949) - Steve (uncredited)
- Across the Rio Grande (1949) - Joe Bardet
- West of El Dorado (1949) - Steve Dallas
- Range Justice (1949) - Henchman Kirk
- Roaring Westward (1949) - Morgan
- Deputy Marshal (1949) - Cal Freeling
- Riders in the Sky (1949) - Travis
- Lawless Code (1949) - Tom Blaine - Henchman
- Sons of New Mexico (1949) - Ed - Henchman (uncredited)
- Range Land (1949) - Sheriff Winters
- Davy Crockett, Indian Scout (1950) - Sgt. Gordon
- Radar Secret Service (1950) - Michael's Henchman
- Mule Train (1950) - Latigo (uncredited)
- Code of the Silver Sage (1950) - Dick Cantwell - Henchman
- Jiggs and Maggie Out West (1950) - Slim - Henchman (uncredited)
- A Life of Her Own (1950) - Man Asking Invitation (uncredited)
- Surrender (1950) - Rider Warning of Gregg (uncredited)
- Indian Territory (1950) - 3rd Man Shot by Apache (uncredited)
- Last of the Buccaneers (1950) - Pirate Captain (uncredited)
- The Blazing Sun (1950) - Al Bartlett & Mark Bartlett
- Wanted: Dead or Alive (1951) - Henchman (uncredited)
- Badman's Gold (1951) - Rance
- Whirlwind (1951) - Slim - Henchman (uncredited)
- Nevada Badmen (1951) - Bob Bannon (uncredited)
- The Texas Rangers (1951) - Bart Howard - Outlaw (uncredited)
- Silver Canyon (1951) - Corporal (uncredited)
- Oklahoma Justice (1951) - Sheriff Barnes
- The Hills of Utah (1951) - Indigo Hubbard - Henchman
- Drums in the Deep South (1951) - Union Officer (uncredited)
- The Frontier Phantom (1951) - Sam Mantell
- Indian Uprising (1952) - Lt. Richards (uncredited)
- On Top of Old Smoky (1953) - McQuaid
- Jack McCall, Desperado (1953) - Gang Member at Party (uncredited)
- Pack Train (1953) - Ross McLain
- The Lawless Rider (1954) - Freno Frost
- Hell's Horizon (1955) - Maj. Naylor
- Flesh and the Spur (1956) - Kale Tanner
- Revolt at Fort Laramie (1957) - Capt. Foley (uncredited)
- Outlaw Queen (1957) - Sheriff
- The Iron Sheriff (1957) - Leveret's Brother-in-Law (uncredited)
- The Parson and the Outlaw (1957) - Matt McCloud (uncredited)
- The Astounding She-Monster (1957) - Nat Burdell
- Date with Death (1959) - Andrews - Freight-Train Watchman
- Revenge of the Virgins (1959) - Narrator (voice, uncredited)
- Night of the Ghouls (1959) - Dr. Acula
- Oklahoma Territory (1960) - Bigelow Henchman (uncredited)
- The Music Box Kid (1960) - Truck Driver's Helper (uncredited)
- Natchez Trace (1960) - William Murrell
- The Sinister Urge (1960) - Lt. Matt Carson
- Like Wow! (1962) - Car Salesman

== Selected television appearances ==
Year	Title	Role	Notes
1950	The Cisco Kid	Station Agent	Episode "Dog Story"
1950	The Lone Ranger (TV Series)	Jeff Barnes	Episode "Greed for Gold"
1950	The Lone Ranger (TV Series)	Deputy Joe Parker	Episode "Death Trap"
1951	The Cisco Kid	Sheriff	Episode "The Old Bum"
1951	The Cisco Kid	Sheriff	Episode "Water Rights"
1953	Death Valley Days	Second Robber	Season 1, Episode 9 " Cynthy's Dream Dress "
1953	The Lone Ranger (TV Series)	Sheriff Dunn	Episode "Trader Boggs"
1953	Death Valley Days	Nevada Secretary of State	Season 2, Episode 2 " Little Washington"
1955	The Life and Legend of Wyatt Earp	Davie - Pierce Foreman	Episode " King of the Cattle Trails"
1956	Death Valley Days	Bartender	Episode "Pay Dirt "
1956	Death Valley Days	McConnell	Episode " Year of Destiny"
1956	The Life and Legend of Wyatt Earp	Dr. Perkins	Episode " The Lonesomest Man in the World"
1958	The Life and Legend of Wyatt Earp	Duecey Miller	Episode " The Kansas Lily"
1958	The Life and Legend of Wyatt Earp	Kendall	Episode "The Bounty Killer"
1958	The Life and Legend of Wyatt Earp	Caldwell	Episode " Kill the Editor"
1958	Tombstone Territory	Bartender	Episode "Fight for a Fugitive "
1958	Tombstone Territory	Bartender	Episode " The Gatling Gun"
1958	Tombstone Territory	Bartender	Episode " The Black Marshal from Deadwood"
1958	Bat Masterson	Newspaper Reporter	Episode " General Sherman's March Through Dodge City "
1960	Rawhide	Sheriff Brown	Episode "Incident of the Sharpshooter"
