= Calling Wild Bill Elliott =

1943 film by Spencer Gordon Bennet

- Film poster
- Directed by: Spencer Gordon Bennet
- Screenplay by: Anthony Coldeway
- Story by: Luci Ward
- Produced by: Harry Grey
- Starring: Wild Bill Elliott; George "Gabby" Hayes; Anne Jeffreys; Herbert Heyes; Robert 'Buzz' Henry; Fred Kohler Jr.
- Cinematography: Ernest Miller
- Edited by: Edward Schroeder
- Music by: Mort Glickman
- Production company: Republic Pictures
- Distributed by: Republic Pictures
- Release date: April 30, 1943
- Running time: 55 minutes
- Country: United States
- Language: English

Calling Wild Bill Elliott is a 1943 American Western film directed by Spencer Gordon Bennet and written by Anthony Coldeway. The film stars Wild Bill Elliott, George "Gabby" Hayes, Anne Jeffreys, Herbert Heyes, Robert 'Buzz' Henry and Fred Kohler Jr. The film was released on April 30, 1943, by Republic Pictures.

== Cast ==
- Wild Bill Elliott as Wild Bill Elliott
- George "Gabby" Hayes as Gabby Hayes
- Anne Jeffreys as Edith Richards
- Herbert Heyes as Governor Steve Nichols
- Robert 'Buzz' Henry as John Culver Jr.
- Fred Kohler Jr. as John Culver
- Roy Barcroft as Captain Carson
- Eve March as Mary Culver
- Burr Caruth as Grandpa Culver
- Bud Geary as Henchman Dean
- Lynton Brent as Ranch hand
