= Great Stagecoach Robbery =

1945 film by Lesley Selander

- Directed by: Lesley Selander
- Written by: Randall Faye (screenplay); Fred Harman (based on characters created in the comic strip)
- Produced by: Louis Gray
- Starring: Wild Bill Elliott
- Cinematography: Bud Thackery
- Edited by: Charles Craft
- Music by: Joseph Dubin
- Distributed by: Republic Pictures
- Release date: 1945
- Running time: 64 minutes (original run time)
- Country: United States
- Language: English

Great Stagecoach Robbery is a 1945 American Western film directed by Howard Bretherton starring Wild Bill Elliott in the role of Red Ryder and costarring as Little Beaver, actor (Bobby) Robert Blake. It was the sixth of twenty-three Red Ryder feature films that would be produced by Republic Pictures. The picture was shot on the studio's back lot along with outdoor locations at Iverson Ranch, 1 Iverson Lane, Chatsworth, Los Angeles, CA, USA.

== Plot ==
In the 1890s town of Blue Springs, Jed Quinlan (Don Costello), the schoolteacher, breaks up a fight between tomboy Boots Hollister (Sylvia Arslan) and Little Beaver (Robert Blake), the Indian ward of Red Ryder's. Each child has taunted the other with names like "wildcat" and "Indian." Quinlan "disciplines" both children and later when the children return to the schoolhouse accompanied by Boots' older brother Billy (John James) and Little Beaver's Red Ryder's (Wild Bill Elliott) aunt, The Duchess (Alice Fleming). Elsewhere, Quinlan meets with Con Hollister's (Francis McDonald) former cohort, Joe Slade (Bud Geary), who reveals that Con was released weeks earlier. Quinlan, who poses as a teacher to cover his criminal activity, reckons that Con should arrive on the next day's stage, and that the upcoming shipment must be Con's old loot, which was never recovered.

Con Hollister, released from prison and now reformed, plans to return the $150,000 loot taken in a stagecoach holdup five years previous. Quinlan and his henchman, Slade, entice the hot-tempered Billy into robbing the stage. However, Red prevents the theft and is pleasantly surprised to discover that Con, who is a passenger on the stage, has reformed will return the money to the bank.

Boots is overjoyed to see her father when he arrives in Blue Springs, however, her brother is less so, particularly after Con declares that the Hollister family is going to make a clean start. So, when Con and Boots go to town to seek a loan to rebuild their ranch, Billy runs off to join Slade.

No one in Blue Springs will provide Con a loan much less give him a second chance, even though Red does his best to vouch for him. Bitter at seeing his father treated so shabbily, Billy agrees to help Quinlan rob the bank. Red manages to break up the robbery but the gang gets away but not before Con Hollister recognizes his son as one of the bandits. Red shoots Slade and wounds Quinlan who escapes to Con's barn where he hides out, unbeknownst to the others. Con finds his horse and the saddlebags containing the stolen money but when Red arrives and sees the money, he suspect Con. Hollister manages to get away by locking Red in a closet before taking off to pursue his son, Billy, whom he saw robbing the bank.

Little Beaver arrives at the ranch and frees Red who rides in pursuit of Con Hollister. Boots who was left behind, discovers the wounded Quinlan hiding the barn and when she realizes that he is one of the robbers, she is killed in cold blood with Quinlan using one of Red's pistols as the murder weapon. Afterwards, the bogus-teacher attempts to frame Red Ryder by claiming that he's the killer.

Red figures out that Quinlan is the escaped robber and proves his guilt by comparing his wound to a bullet hole in the saddle bags, which he had been carrying over his shoulder. Red captures Quinlan, who is sentenced to hang following Billy's court testimony. Afterwards, Billy is paroled to his father's custody, and later both bid a grateful farewell to Red Ryder and Little Beaver.

== Cast ==
- Wild Bill Elliott as Red Ryder
- Robert Blake as Little Beaver
- Alice Fleming as The Duchess (Red's Aunt)
- Don Costello as Jed Quinlan
- Francis McDonald as Con Hollister
- John James as Billy Hollister
- Sylvia Arsla] as Boots Hollister
- Bud Geary as Joe Slade
- Leon Tyler as Tattletale
- Freddie Chapman as Freddie
- Hank Bell as Stage Driver (uncredited)
- Lucille Byron as Dancer (uncredited)
- Horace B. Carpenter as Townsman (uncredited)
- Grace Cunard as Mrs. Goodbody (uncredited)
- Bobby Dillon as Goodbody Boy (uncredited)
- Dickie Dillon as Goodbody Boy (uncredited)
- Fred Graham as Bank Brawler (uncredited)
- Fred Howard as Henchman (uncredited)
- Tom London as Townsman (uncredited)
- Patsy May as Goodbody Girl (uncredited)
- Dorothy Stevens as Dancer (uncredited)
- Robert J. Wilke as Stage Guard (uncredited)
- Henry Wills as Henchman Jake (uncredited)
- Chris Wren as Young Boy (uncredited)
- Raymond ZeBrack as Doubtful-Unlikely Listing (uncredited)

== Production ==
Great Stagecoach Robbery (1945) was based on the characters created in Fred Harman's comic strip, Red Ryder. Even though most of the scene occurred off camera, the killing of the young child, 'Boots' Hollister was one of the darkest and most chilling scenes, even seen in a Republic Pictures' western that was primarily intended for a young Saturday matinée theatre goer. The film was premiered in Los Angeles on October 26, 1945 and then opened February 15, 1945. The film was later re-released on February 7, 1949.

=== Stunts ===
- Bud Geary
- Post Park
- Cliff Parkinson
- Tom Steele
- Dale Van Sickel
