= Bordertown Gun Fighters =

1943 film by Howard Bretherton

- Theatrical release poster
- Directed by: Howard Bretherton
- Screenplay by: Norman S. Hall
- Produced by: Edward J. White
- Starring: Wild Bill Elliott; George "Gabby" Hayes; Anne Jeffreys; Ian Keith; Harry Woods; Edward Earle
- Cinematography: Jack A. Marta
- Edited by: Richard L. Van Enger
- Music by: Mort Glickman
- Production company: Republic Pictures
- Distributed by: Republic Pictures
- Release date: July 8, 1943
- Running time: 56 minutes
- Country: United States
- Language: English

Bordertown Gun Fighters is a 1943 American Western film directed by Howard Bretherton and written by Norman S. Hall. The film stars Wild Bill Elliott, George "Gabby" Hayes, Anne Jeffreys, Ian Keith, Harry Woods and Edward Earle. The film was released on July 8, 1943, by Republic Pictures.

== Cast ==
- Wild Bill Elliott as Wild Bill Elliott
- George "Gabby" Hayes as Gabby Hayes
- Anne Jeffreys as Anita Shelby
- Ian Keith as Cameo Shelby
- Harry Woods as Dave Strickland
- Edward Earle as Dan Forrester
- Karl Hackett as Frank Holden
- Roy Barcroft as Jack Gatling
- Bud Geary as Henchman Buck
