= Charles Craft =

American film editor (1902–1968)

- Born: May 9, 1902; Hampshire, England, United Kingdom
- Died: September 19, 1968 (aged 66); Los Angeles, California, United States
- Occupations: Film and television editor
- Years active: 1927–1966

Charles Craft (May 9, 1902 – September 19, 1968) was an English-born American film and television editor. Born in the county of Hampshire in England on May 9, 1902, Craft would enter the film industry in Hollywood in 1927. The first film he edited was the Universal Pictures silent film, Painting the Town. Over the next 25 years, Craft would edit 90 feature-length films. In the early 1950s he would switch his focus to the small screen, his first show being Racket Squad, from 1951 to 1953, for which he was the main editor, editing 93 of the 98 episodes. He would work on several other series during the 1950s, including Meet Corliss Archer (1954), Science Fiction Theatre (1955–56), and Highway Patrol (1955–57). In the late 1950s and early 1960s he was one of the main editors on Sea Hunt, starring Lloyd Bridges, editing over half of the episodes. His final film work would be editing Flipper's New Adventure (1964, the sequel to 1963's Flipper. When the film was made into a television series, Craft would begin the editing duties on that show, editing the first 28 episodes before he retired in 1966. Craft died on September 19, 1968, in Los Angeles, California.

== Filmography ==
(Per AFI database)

- Painting the Town (1927)
- A Hero for a Night (1927)
- The Gate Crasher (1928)
- Hot Heels (1928)
- How to Handle Women (1928)
- The Cohens and Kellys in Atlantic City (1929)
- The Kid's Clever (1929)
- Rich People (1929)
- The Common Law (1931)
- The Tip-Off (1931)
- The Big Shot (1931)
- Lady with a Past (1932)
- Westward Passage (1932)
- Panama Flo (1932)
- The Silent Code (1935)
- Down to the Sea (1936)
- Bulldog Edition (1936)
- The Gentleman from Louisiana (1936)
- Adventure's End (1937)
- I Cover the War (1937)
- Secret Valley (1937)
- Idol of the Crowds (1937)
- California Straight Ahead (1937)
- Courage of the West (1937)
- Outlaw Express (1938)
- Western Trails (1938)
- Air Devils (1938)
- State Police (1938)
- The Spy Ring (1938)
- Border Wolves (1938)
- The Last Stand (1938)
- The Singing Outlaw (1938)
- Friendly Neighbors (1940)
- Barnyard Follies (1940)
- Bad Man of Deadwood (1941)
- Gauchos of Eldorado (1941)
- In Old Cheyenne (1941)
- Kansas Cyclone (1941)
- A Man Betrayed (1941)
- Mountain Moonlight (1941)
- Robin Hood of the Pecos (1941)
- Rookies on Parade (1941)
- Tuxedo Junction (1941)
- Code of the Outlaw (1942)
- Joan of Ozark (1942)
- Raiders of the Range (1942)
- Remember Pearl Harbor (1942)
- Shepherd of the Ozarks (1942)
- The Traitor Within (1942)
- London Blackout Murders (1943)
- Overland Mail Robbery (1943)
- The Purple V (1943)
- Riders of the Rio Grande (1943)
- Santa Fe Scouts (1943)
- Wagon Tracks West (1943)
- Beyond the Last Frontier (1943)
- Cheyenne Wildcat (1944)
- Marshal of Reno (1944)
- Outlaws of Santa Fe (1944)
- Pride of the Plains (1944)
- Silver City Kid (1944)
- Vigilantes of Dodge City (1944)
- Beneath Western Skies (1944)
- Bordertown Trail (1944)
- Sheriff of Las Vegas (1944)
- The Cherokee Flash (1945)
- Colorado Pioneers (1945)
- Corpus Christi Bandits (1945)
- Don't Fence Me In (1945)
- Great Stagecoach Robbery (1945)
- Lone Texas Ranger (1945)
- Marshal of Laredo (1945)
- Phantom of the Plains (1945)
- The Topeka Terror (1945)
- Wagon Wheels Westward (1945)
- Alias Billy the Kid (1946)
- California Gold Rush (1946)
- Conquest of Cheyenne (1946)
- Home on the Range (1946)
- Out California Way (1946)
- Rainbow Over Texas (1946)
- Sun Valley Cyclone (1946)
- High Conquest (1947)
- Homesteaders of Paradise Valley (1947)
- Last Frontier Uprising (1947)
- Trail to San Antone (1947)
- 16 Fathoms Deep (1948)
- Alaska Patrol (1949)
- Young Daniel Boone (1950)
- Home Town Girl (1951)
- Underwater Warrior (1958)
- Flipper's New Adventure (1964)
