= Phantom of the Plains =

1945 film by Lesley Selander

- Directed by: Lesley Selander
- Written by: Earle Snell & Charles Kenyon (screenplay); Fred Harman (based on characters created in the comic strip)
- Produced by: Louis Gray
- Starring: Wild Bill Elliott
- Cinematography: William Bradford
- Edited by: Charles Craft
- Music by: Richard Cherwin
- Distributed by: Republic Pictures
- Release date: 1945
- Running time: 66 minutes (original run time)
- Country: United States
- Language: English

Phantom of the Plains is a 1945 American Western film directed by Lesley Selander starring Wild Bill Elliott in the role of Red Ryder and costarring as Little Beaver, actor (Bobby) Robert Blake. It was the ninth of 23 'Red Ryder' feature films that would be produced by Republic Pictures. The picture was shot on the studio's back lot along with outdoor locations at Iverson Ranch in Chatsworth, Los Angeles, CA, USA.

== Plot ==
Red Ryder (Wild Bill Elliott) and Little Beaver (Robert Blake) return to Blue Springs of 1895, only to discover that the Duchess (Alice Fleming), Red's aunt, is preparing to sell her stage coach line and marry an Englishman, Talbot Champneys (Ian Keith). Unbeknownst to them, Champneys is really a conman named Fancy Charlie, who has made a career of marrying rich women and then killing them for their money. The Duchess' other suitors Earle Hodgins and Tom London are unhappy when her engagement to Champneys aka Fancy Charlie is announced.

Red meets Champneys at the Duchess' ranch where he also meets Fancy Charlie's confederate, Celeste (Virginia Christine), who poses as a couturiere. The outlaws, Ace Hanlon (William Haade) and Pete Burdet (Bud Geary) appear suddenly at the ranch to greet Champneys. Champneys is surprised to see them because Burdet was once Fancy Charlie's cellmate. Burdet has tipped off Ace Hanlon and now both of them want to be cut in on Fancy Charlie's deal and share in the Duchess' fortune. Charlie refuses, and Burdett starts beating on him when Red arrives and captures Burdett, but misses Hanlon, who flees in time to escape. Charlie asks Red to let Burdet go, explaining that he is merely an acquaintance who cheated him in a poker game. Red is reluctant to comply, but does so when Charlie insists.

Red remains concerned about his aunt but acquiesces to her demands but when he later sees Champneys mistreating Thunder (Red's horse), Red intercedes and knocks him down. He decides to investigate and secretly wires the British consul for information about Champneys.

Afraid that Red will ruin his plans, Charlie finally decides to offer Hanlon and Burdett a 50% share of his profits if they get ride of Red and Little Beaver. Charlie then proceeds to inform the Duchess that he must return to England immediately and wants her to go with him so they can be married along the way. She agrees to go despite Red's strenuous objections. Charlie smiles, knowing that he has fully persuaded the Duchess to return to England with him and to bring her money with her. They agree to meet at the railroad station.

In the meantime, Celeste overhears Red and Little Beaver talking about picking up the reply from the British consul. Hanlon and Burdett are notified and make preparation to capture the two at the telegraph office. Red and Little Beaver are held prisoner overnight and the next morning, Charlie taunts them by congratulating Red on seeing through his disguise and charade, but then assures the red-headed cowboy that the Duchess will soon be dead.

Ace Hanlon suspects that Fancy Charlie might double cross him and Burdet; so, instead of killing Red and Little Beaver, they plan to keep them alive, until after the Duchess is killed. Fortunately, Red and Little Beaver cleverly escape and rush to stop Fancy Charlie and save the Duchess. They arrive just in time. Ace Hanlon, Burdet, and Fancy Charlie escape, feeling out of town on a stagecoach. Red leaps into the saddle and he and Thunder race after them.

Fancy Charlie is captured and his nefarious plot is exposed. He is on the way to jail, but not before the Duchess hits him square in the face with their wedding cake.

== Cast ==
- Wild Bill Elliott as Red Ryder
- Robert Blake as Little Beaver
- Alice Fleming as The Duchess (Red's Aunt)
- Ian Keith as Talbot Wilberforce Champneys, aka Fancy Charlie
- William Haade as Ace Hanlon
- Virginia Christine as Celeste
- Bud Geary as Henchman Pete Burdette
- Henry Hall as Banker Jim
- Fred Graham as Henchman Chuck
- Jack Kirk as Sheriff Jack Rockwell
- Jack Rockwell as Stage Driver Buck
- Bob Burns as Townsman (uncredited)
- Neal Hart as Townsman (uncredited)
- Earle Hodgins as Duchess Suitor (uncredited)
- Tom London as Duchess Suitor (uncredited)
- Rose Plumer as Townswoman (uncredited)
- Jack Tornek as Townsman (uncredited)

== Production ==
Phantom of the Plains (1945) was based on the characters created in Fred Harman's comic strip, Red Ryder. The film premiered in Los Angeles on September 7, 1945. It was later re-released on August 4, 1949.

=== Stunts ===
- Bud Geary
- Tom Steele
- Dale Van Sickel
- Henry Wills
