= Beneath Western Skies =

1944 film

- Theatrical release poster
- Directed by: Spencer Gordon Bennet
- Screenplay by: Albert DeMond; Robert Creighton Williams
- Story by: Albert DeMond
- Produced by: Louis Gray
- Starring: Robert Livingston; Smiley Burnette; Effie Laird; Frank Jaquet; Tom London; Charles Miller
- Cinematography: Ernest Miller
- Edited by: Charles Craft
- Music by: Mort Glickman
- Production company: Republic Pictures
- Distributed by: Republic Pictures
- Release date: March 3, 1944
- Running time: 56 minutes
- Country: United States
- Language: English

Beneath Western Skies is a 1944 American Western film directed by Spencer Gordon Bennet and written by Albert DeMond and Robert Creighton Williams. The film stars Robert Livingston, Smiley Burnette, Effie Laird, Frank Jaquet, Tom London and Charles Miller. The film was released on March 3, 1944, by Republic Pictures.

== Cast ==
- Robert Livingston as Johnny Revere
- Smiley Burnette as Sheriff Frog Millhouse
- Effie Laird as Carrie Stokes
- Frank Jaquet as Sam Webster
- Tom London as Earl Phillips
- Charles Miller as Lem Toller
- Joe Strauch Jr. as Tadpole Millhouse
- LeRoy Mason as Bull Bricker
- Kenne Duncan as Deputy Barrow
- Charles Dorety as The Drunk
- Jack Kirk as Wainwright
- Bud Geary as Henchman Hank
