= Tom Chatterton =

American actor (1881–1952)

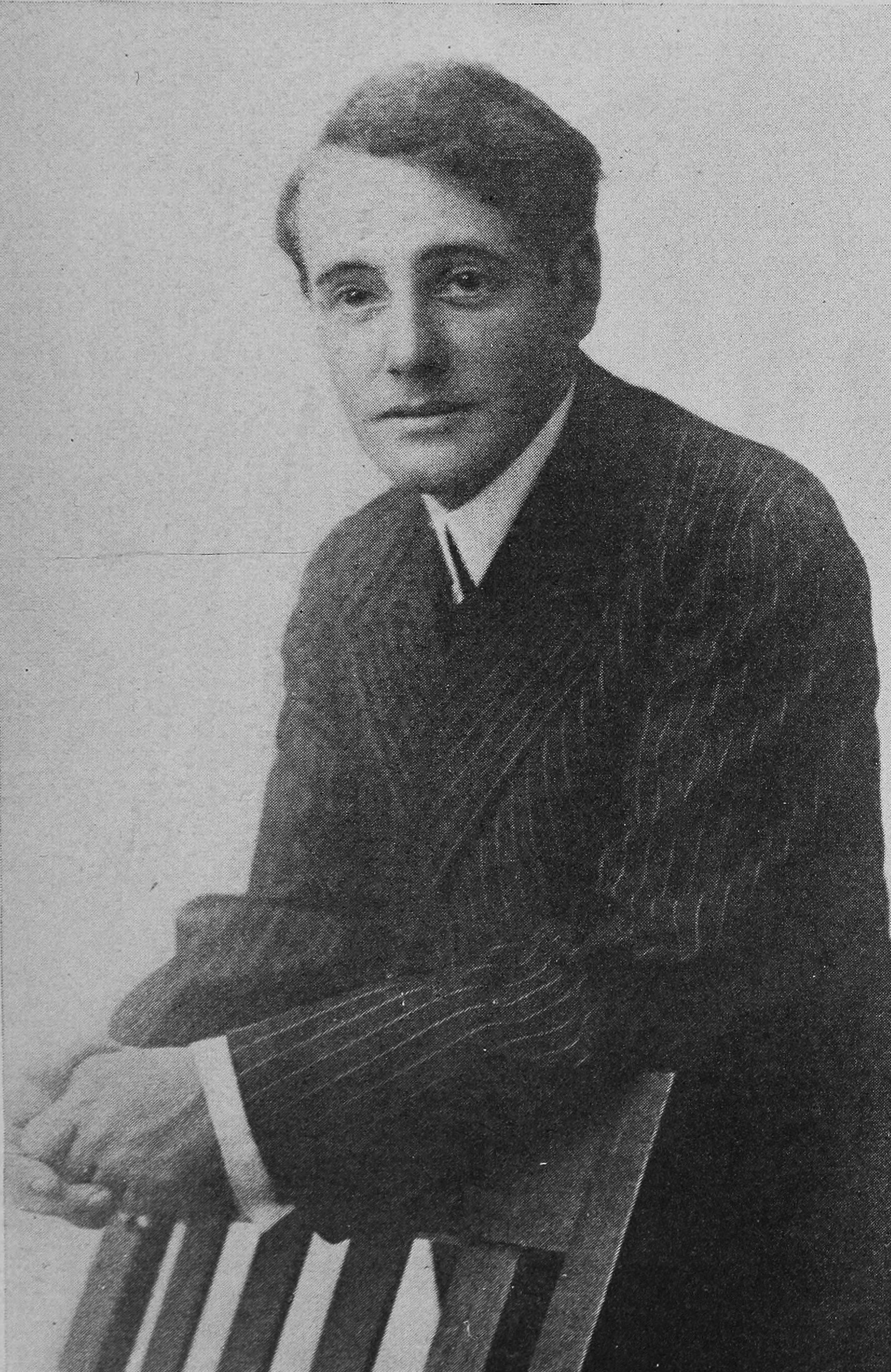
- Chatterton in 1914
- Born: February 12, 1881; Geneva, New York US
- Died: August 17, 1952 (aged 71); Hollywood, California US

Tom Chatterton (February 12, 1881 – August 17, 1952) was an American actor and director.

Born in Geneva, New York, Chatterton was active in sports as a youth. He gained early acting experience with Ben Horning's stock theater company in Syracuse, New York. He worked with several stock theater companies, and for three years he portrayed the mayor in a touring company of The Man of the Hour. He also was active in vaudeville.

He began his film career in 1913 at the New York Motion Picture Company under director Thomas H. Ince. Although never a major star, Chatterton had several leading roles in early silent films. He appeared in a large number of westerns and was able to adapt to talkies allowing him to have a successful career lasting five decades.

Chatterton was also a film director.

He died in Hollywood in 1952 and was interred in the Glenwood Cemetery in his hometown of Geneva.

== Selected filmography ==
- The Open Door (1913, Short) - Rev. Walton
- The Voice at the Telephone (1914) - Dick Carson
- On the Night Stage (1915) - Stagecoach Driver (uncredited)
- The Secret of the Submarine (1915) - Lt. Jarvis Hope
- Father and the Boys (1915)
- A Soul Enslaved (1916) - Richard Newton
- Bluff (1916) - Harold Wainwright
- Beloved Rogues (1917) - Jack Kennedy
- Whither Thou Goest (1917) - Tom Van Wye
- At the Mercy of Tiberius (1920) - Lennox Dunbar
- The Gilded Dream (1920) - Jasper Halroyd
- Her Husband's Friend (1920) - Princeton Hadley
- Would You Forgive? (1920) - John Cleveland
- The Boss Rider of Gun Creek (1936) - Sheriff Blaine
- Sandflow (1937) - Sheriff
- Venus Makes Trouble (1937) - Kenneth Rowland
- You Can't Beat Love (1937) - Mr. Raymond (uncredited)
- A Fight to the Finish (1937) - Mayberry
- The Toast of New York (1937) - Fisk Broker (uncredited)
- It Happened in Hollywood (1937) - Bank Manager (uncredited)
- Sudden Bill Dorn (1937) - Morgan
- All American Sweetheart (1937) - Thatcher (uncredited)
- Declaration of Independence (1938) Richard Henry Lee (uncredited)
- This Marriage Business (1938) - Mr. Grant (uncredited)
- Under Western Stars (1938) - Congressman Edward H. Marlowe
- Sky Giant (1938) - Johnson (uncredited)
- Smashing the Rackets (1938) - Grand Juryman (uncredited)
- Hold That Co-ed (1938) - Political Adviser (uncredited)
- Hawk of the Wilderness (1938) - Dr. Edward Munro
- Kentucky (1938) - Man at Race Track (uncredited)
- Arizona Legion (1939) - Commissioner Teagle
- The Oklahoma Kid (1939) - Homesteader (uncredited)
- Trouble in Sundown (1939) - Brown - Prosecuting Attorney (uncredited)
- The Story of Vernon and Irene Castle (1939) - Announcer at Benefit (uncredited)
- Dodge City (1939) - Passenger (uncredited)
- The Man Who Dared (1939) - Police Commissioner (uncredited)
- Man of Conquest (1939) - Official (uncredited)
- Thunder Afloat (1939) - Lieutenant (uncredited)
- Calling All Marines (1939) - Judge (uncredited)
- Rovin' Tumbleweeds (1939) - Speaker of the House (uncredited)
- Laugh It Off (1939) - Politician (uncredited)
- The Big Guy (1939) - Doctor (uncredited)
- Abe Lincoln in Illinois (1940) - Minor Role (uncredited)
- Village Barn Dance (1940) - Station Executive (uncredited)
- Drums of Fu Manchu (1940) - Prof. Edward Randolph
- Flash Gordon Conquers the Universe (1940, Serial) - Professor Arden [Chs. 1, 4]
- Covered Wagon Days (1940) - Major J.A. Norton
- Hot Steel (1940) - Bank Director (uncredited)
- Black Diamonds (1940) - Dr. Lukas
- Son of Roaring Dan (1940) - Stuart Manning
- The Trail Blazers (1940) - Major R.C. Kelton
- Pony Post (1940) - Maj. Goodwin
- Desert Bandit (1941) - Texas Ranger Capt. Banning
- Outlaws of Cherokee Trail (1941) - Capt. Sheldon
- Honky Tonk (1941) - Townsman (uncredited)
- Reap the Wild Wind (1942) - Parson (uncredited)
- Raiders of the Range (1942) - 'Doc' Higgins
- Overland Mail (1942) - Tom Gilbert
- Santa Fe Scouts (1943) - Neil Morgan
- Adventures of the Flying Cadets (1943, Serial) - Railroad Conductor [Ch. 2] (uncredited)
- Captain America (1944, Serial) - J.C. Henley [Chs. 6-8]
- Rosie the Riveter (1944) - Official (uncredited)
- Tucson Raiders (1944) - Judge James Wayne
- Man from Frisco (1944) - Doctor (uncredited)
- Marshal of Reno (1944) - The Judge
- Cheyenne Wildcat (1944) - Jason Hopkins
- Code of the Prairie (1944) - Marshal Bat Matson
- An American Romance (1944) - Board of Directors Member (uncredited)
- Zorro's Black Whip (1944, Serial) - Crescent City Councilman
- I'll Remember April (1945) - Board Member (uncredited)
- The Phantom Speaks (1945) - Prison Chaplain (uncredited)
- Lone Texas Ranger (1945) - Sheriff Iron Mike Haines
- Mama Loves Papa (1945) - Speaker (uncredited)
- Love, Honor and Goodbye (1945) - Minor Role (uncredited)
- Marshal of Laredo (1945) - Reverend Parker
- Colorado Pioneers (1945) - Father Marion
- Lawless Empire (1945) - Editor Enders (uncredited)
- Gay Blades (1946) - Babson (uncredited)
- Sheriff of Redwood Valley (1946) - Doc Ellis
- Alias Billy the Kid (1946) - Ed Pearson
- Home on the Range (1946) - Grizzly Garth
- Without Reservations (1946) - Pullman Conductor (uncredited)
- The Searching Wind (1946) - Joe - Chauffeur (uncredited)
- Conquest of Cheyenne (1946) - Rancher Jones
- Heading West (1946) - Dr. Wyatt (uncredited)
- The Locket (1946) - Art Critic (uncredited)
- It's a Wonderful Life (1946) - Townsman (uncredited)
- Stagecoach to Denver (1946) - Doc Kimball
- California (1947) - Joe (uncredited)
- West of Dodge City (1947) - Banker (uncredited)
- Smash-Up, the Story of a Woman (1947) - Edwards, Ken's Butler (uncredited)
- The Trouble with Women (1947) - Mr. Krock (uncredited)
- Something in the Wind (1947) - Bronston (uncredited)
- Jesse James Rides Again (1947, Serial) - Sheriff Mark Tobin (uncredited)
- The Fabulous Texan (1947) - Citizen (uncredited)
- Secret Beyond the Door (1947) - Judge (uncredited)
- Heart of Virginia (1948) - Dr. Purdy
- Carson City Raiders (1948) - John Davis
- Marshal of Amarillo (1948) - James Underwood
- The Denver Kid (1948) - Doctor (uncredited)
- Outlaw Brand (1948) - Tom Chadwick
- Family Honeymoon (1948) - Stewart (uncredited)
- Highway 13 (1948) - J.E. Norris (uncredited)
- The Life of Riley (1949) - Minor Role (uncredited)
- Gun Law Justice (1949) - Bill Thorp (uncredited)
- Prince of the Plains (1949) - Ned Owens (uncredited)
- The Wyoming Bandit (1949) - Doctor (uncredited) (final film role)
