= Trick Shooting with Kenne Duncan =

- Directed by: Edward D. Wood, Jr.
- Written by: Edward D. Wood, Jr.
- Produced by: Ronald V. Ashcroft
- Starring: Kenne Duncan
- Music by: Gene Kauer
- Release date: 1952
- Running time: 9 min.
- Country: United States
- Language: English

Trick Shooting with Kenne Duncan is a 1952 promotional film directed by Ed Wood. Total run time is nine minutes and it was produced c. 1952. It consists of Kenne Duncan performing trick shooting stunts and showcasing firearms made by Remington Arms. Duncan had become known as a villain for B-movie Westerns and the film was an attempt to capitalize on his fame.

The rifles showcased were a Remington Model 552 and a Remington Nylon 66. The film includes posters and advertisements of Duncan performing at state fairs and nightclubs, and also still pictures from his roles in Westerns. A sequence features newsreel footage of his visit and performances in Japan.

== Sources ==
- Craig, Rob (2009), "Selected Short Subjects", Ed Wood, Mad Genius: A Critical Study of the Films, McFarland & Company, ISBN 978-0786454235
- Hayes, David C.; Davis, Hayden (2001), "The Complete Filmography", Muddled Mind: The Complete Works of Edward D. Wood, Jr., Lulu, ISBN 978-1605430539
