= Don Costello =

American actor (1901–1945)

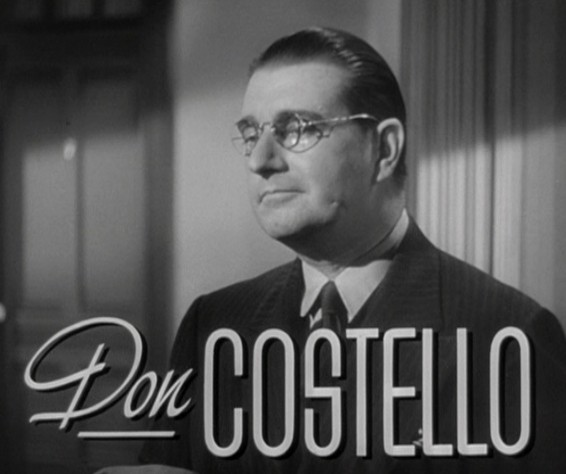
- Costello in Another Thin Man (1939)
- Born: Eldon Lawrence Costello; September 5, 1901; New Orleans, Louisiana, U.S.
- Died: October 25, 1945 (aged 44); Hollywood, California, U.S.
- Resting place: Forest Lawn Memorial Park (Glendale)
- Occupation: Actor
- Years active: 1929–1945
- Spouse: Louise Maresch (m. ?-1945) (his death)

Eldon Lawrence "Don" Costello (September 5, 1901 – October 25, 1945) was an American actor of stage, screen and radio.

== Background ==
Eldon Lawrence Costello was born on September 5, 1901, in New Orleans, where Jesuit Fathers educated him. His initial plans to study law gave way to his interest in acting.

== Career ==
In the mid 1920s, Costello was stage manager for the Wright Players in Louisville, Kentucky. Later in that decade, he acted with the Majestic Players in Elmira, New York.

Costello entered films in 1935 and in 1939 was put under contract with MGM. Known for his wicked sense of humor, Costello oftentimes played the role of a menace or a tough guy. He is probably best known for his role as Lefty in the movie Here Comes Mr. Jordan (1941). He appeared in 37 movies (31 times credited), including Another Thin Man (1939), Johnny Eager (1941) and The Blue Dahlia (1946).

== Death ==
Costello died of an overdose of sleeping tablets on October 25, 1945, at the age of 44. His wife, Louise, found him dead in the bedroom of their home in Sherman Oaks. He had earlier complained of being unable to get to sleep.

== Broadway roles ==
- Jerry-for-Short (1929) - Anthony La Vere
- The Last Mile (1930) - Drake
- Face the Music (1933) - Louis / Mr. O'Ryan
- The Ghost of Yankee Doodle (1937) - Ockleford

== Partial filmography ==
- Another Thin Man (1939) - 'Diamond Back' Vogel
- Joe and Ethel Turp Call on the President (1939) - Fred
- One Crowded Night (1940) - Lefty
- Wildcat Bus (1940) - Sid Casey
- Sleepers West (1941) - Carl Izzard
- Ride on Vaquero (1941) - Redge
- I'll Wait for You (1941) - Police Sergeant Brent
- Here Comes Mr. Jordan (1941) - Lefty
- Whistling in the Dark (1941) - 'Noose' Green
- Last of the Duanes (1941) - Jim Bland
- Unholy Partners (1941) - Georgie Pelotti
- Johnny Eager (1941) - Billiken
- Joe Smith, American (1942) - Mead
- Sundown Jim (1942) - Dobe Hyde
- A-Haunting We Will Go (1942) - Doc Lake
- Just Off Broadway (1942) - George Dolphin
- A Night to Remember (1942) - Eddie Turner
- Truck Busters (1943) - Anthony 'Tony' Bonetti
- Air Raid Wardens (1943) - Heydrich
- Crime Doctor (1943) - Nick Ferris
- A Lady Takes a Chance (1943) - Drunk
- Murder on the Waterfront (1943) - Gordon Shane - 'The Great Rajah'
- Texas Masquerade (1944) - Ace Maxson
- Rationing (1944) - Ace (uncredited)
- The Whistler (1944) - Lefty Vigran aka Gorss (uncredited)
- Mystery Man (1944) - Bud Trilling
- Here Come the Co-Eds (1945) - Diamond (uncredited)
- Great Stagecoach Robbery (1945) - Jed Quinlan
- It's in the Bag! (1945) - Mickey (uncredited)
- Nob Hill (1945) - Steve, Fighting Bartender (uncredited)
- Along Came Jones (1945) - Leo Gledhill
- Incendiary Blonde (1945) - Gus Vettori (uncredited)
- Marshal of Laredo (1945) - Henchman Pretty Boy Murphy
- Follow That Woman (1945) - Nick
- The Red Dragon (1945) - Charles Masack
- Crime of the Century (1946) - Joe, Bartender
- The Blue Dahlia (1946) - Leo (final film role)
