= The Colorado Kid (film) =

1937 film by Sam Newfield

- Theatrical release poster
- Directed by: Sam Newfield
- Screenplay by: Charles F. Royal
- Story by: Harry F. Olmsted
- Produced by: A. W. Hackel
- Starring: Bob Steele; Marion Weldon; Karl Hackett; Ernie Adams; Ted Adams; Frank LaRue
- Cinematography: Robert E. Cline
- Edited by: S. Roy Luby
- Production company: Supreme Pictures Corporation
- Distributed by: Republic Pictures
- Release date: December 6, 1937
- Running time: 56 minutes
- Country: United States
- Language: English

The Colorado Kid is a 1937 American Western film directed by Sam Newfield and written by Charles F. Royal. The film stars Bob Steele, Marion Weldon, Karl Hackett, Ernie Adams, Ted Adams and Frank LaRue. The film was released on December 6, 1937, by Republic Pictures.

== Plot ==
Bob, known as the Colorado Kid, is the foreman on the ranch of Colonel Gifford. A business transaction takes place in a saloon, where Gifford accepts $5000 from Wolf Hines for the sale of his livestock. Bob tries to get Gifford to leave the bar and go home, since he is very drunk and carrying so much money. Gifford refuses to leave, and during the disagreement, Bob is fired by Gifford. Gifford leaves the bar alone, and on his way home, Hines, who is the political boss of the town, murders Gifford in order to get the money back. Bob is then accused of the Gifford's murder.

== Cast ==
- Bob Steele as Colorado Kid
- Marion Weldon as Irma Toles
- Karl Hackett as Wolf Hines
- Ernie Adams as Bibben Tucker
- Ted Adams as Sheriff Bill Hannon
- Frank LaRue as Toles
- Horace Murphy as Colonel Gifford
- Kenne Duncan as Henchman Leathers
- Budd Buster as Henchman Hendry
- Frank Ball as Judge Smith
- John Merton as Court Clerk
