= Sheriff of Redwood Valley =

1946 film by R. G. Springsteen

- Theatrical release poster
- Directed by: R. G. Springsteen
- Screenplay by: Earle Snell
- Produced by: Sidney Picker
- Starring: Wild Bill Elliott; Robert Blake; Bob Steele; Alice Fleming; Peggy Stewart; Arthur Loft
- Cinematography: Reggie Lanning
- Edited by: Ralph Dixon
- Production company: Republic Pictures
- Distributed by: Republic Pictures
- Release date: March 29, 1946
- Running time: 54 minutes
- Country: United States
- Language: English

Sheriff of Redwood Valley is a 1946 American Western film in the Red Ryder film series directed by R. G. Springsteen and written by Earle Snell. The film stars Wild Bill Elliott, Robert Blake, Bob Steele, Alice Fleming, Peggy Stewart and Arthur Loft. The film was released on March 29, 1946, by Republic Pictures.

== Cast ==
- Wild Bill Elliott as Red Ryder
- Robert Blake as Little Beaver
- Bob Steele as The Reno Kid
- Alice Fleming as Duchess
- Peggy Stewart as Molly
- Arthur Loft as Harvey Martin
- James Craven as Bidwell
- Tom London as Sheriff
- Kenne Duncan as Jackson
- Bud Geary as Strong
- John Wayne Wright as Johnny
- Tom Chatterton as Doc Ellis
- Budd Buster as Express Agent Crump
- Frank McCarroll as Pete
