= The Gilded Dream =

1920 film

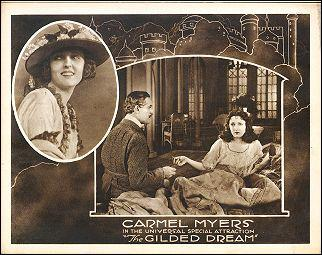
- Lobby card
- Directed by: Rollin S. Sturgeon
- Screenplay by: Doris Schroeder
- Based on: The Gilded Dream by Katherine Leiser Robbins
- Starring: Carmel Myers; Tom Chatterton; Elsa Lorimer; Zola Claire; May McCulley; Boyd Irwin
- Production company: Universal Film Manufacturing Company
- Distributed by: Universal Film Manufacturing Company
- Release date: October 1920
- Running time: 50 minutes
- Country: United States
- Language: Silent (English intertitles)

The Gilded Dream is a 1920 American drama film directed by Rollin S. Sturgeon and written by Doris Schroeder. The film stars Carmel Myers, Tom Chatterton, Elsa Lorimer, Zola Claire, May McCulley, and Boyd Irwin. The film was released in October 1920, by Universal Film Manufacturing Company.

== Plot ==
As described in a film magazine, recently orphaned Leona works hard at a millinery shop in a small town but dreams of a golden future. She goes to New York City where she is taken under the wing of her godmother Geraldine de Forest, a friend of her mother. There she starts an intensive campaign to obtain a gilded marriage using her youth, beauty, and charm. Millionaire Frazer Boynton falls in love with her and proposes, and this seems the goal of her dreams. She has also met another man, Jasper Halroyd, a lovable idler, who becomes devoted solely to her. She finds herself being drawn towards him, but is warned by Geraldine, who is jealous. Leona accepts Frazer after a disappointment with Jasper, whom she tries to forget in the glamour of her gilded dream. An obnoxious country lover visits her and has to be disposed of. Then each day she becomes more disillusioned with life and more miserable. When Geraldine and her go to a country place for vacation, Jasper shows up, he on his way to San Francisco for some big work there. An accident occurs with Leona being rescued by Jasper, and she finds that she loves him, worthy or unworthy. By pursuing her gilded dream, she had become as the society people in New York, so she determines to leave them and find her dreams by her own effort and work. She breaks her engagement with Frazer and Geraldine, concerned by the scandal it will create, orders her from the house and declines to have anything more to do with her. Geraldine also admits that an accusation she made about Jasper was a lie. Now penniless but with renewed self respect, Leona starts for the city where Jasper is waiting.

== Cast ==
- Carmel Myers as Leona
- Tom Chatterton as Jasper Halroyd (credited as Thomas Chatterton)
- Elsa Lorimer as Geraldine
- Zola Claire as Sara
- May McCulley as The Aunt
- Boyd Irwin as Frazer Boynton
- Eddie Dennis as Alex
- Maxine Elliott Hicks as Hicks
