= Colorado Pioneers =

1945 film by R. G. Springsteen

- Theatrical release poster
- Directed by: R. G. Springsteen
- Screenplay by: Earle Snell
- Story by: Peter Whitehead
- Produced by: Sidney Picker
- Starring: Wild Bill Elliott; Robert Blake; Alice Fleming; Roy Barcroft; Bud Geary; Billy Cummings
- Cinematography: Bud Thackery
- Edited by: Charles Craft
- Production company: Republic Pictures
- Distributed by: Republic Pictures
- Release date: November 14, 1945
- Running time: 57 minutes
- Country: United States
- Language: English

Colorado Pioneers is a 1945 American Western film in the Red Ryder film series directed by R. G. Springsteen and written by Earle Snell. The film stars Wild Bill Elliott, Robert Blake, Alice Fleming, Roy Barcroft, Bud Geary and Billy Cummings. The film was released on November 14, 1945, by Republic Pictures.

== Plot ==
Perennial western good guy Red Ryder (Bill Elliott) travels to Chicago and captures the thief Bull Reagan (Roy Barcroft) and his two young misguided youths. When Ryder returns home he finds his home has been partially burned out, and his cowhands abandoning his ranch. Ryder and his aunt, "The Duchess", played by Alice Fleming, attempt to reform the young lads, but they haven't seen the last of Bull Reagan. Reagan returns and attempts to lure his former young aids back to the wrong side of the law.

== Cast ==
- Wild Bill Elliott as Red Ryder
- Robert Blake as Little Beaver
- Alice Fleming as The Duchess
- Roy Barcroft as Bull Reagan
- Bud Geary as Henchman Bill Slade
- Billy Cummings as Joe
- Freddie Chapman as Skinny
- Frank Jaquet as Dave Wyatt
- Tom London as Sand Snipe
- Monte Hale as Cowhand That Quits
- Billie Thomas as Smokey
- George Chesebro as Hank Disher
- Emmett Vogan as Judge
- Tom Chatterton as Father Marion
