= California Gold Rush (film) =

1946 film

- Theatrical release poster
- Directed by: R. G. Springsteen
- Screenplay by: Robert Creighton Williams
- Produced by: Sidney Picker
- Starring: Wild Bill Elliott; Robert Blake; Alice Fleming; Peggy Stewart; Russell Simpson; Dick Curtis
- Cinematography: William Bradford
- Edited by: Charles Craft
- Production company: Republic Pictures
- Distributed by: Republic Pictures
- Release date: February 4, 1946
- Running time: 56 minutes
- Country: United States
- Language: English

California Gold Rush is a 1946 American Western film in the Red Ryder film series directed by R. G. Springsteen and written by Robert Creighton Williams. The film stars Wild Bill Elliott, Robert Blake, Alice Fleming, Peggy Stewart, Russell Simpson and Dick Curtis. It was released on February 4, 1946 by Republic Pictures.

== Cast ==
- Wild Bill Elliott as Red Ryder
- Robert Blake as Little Beaver
- Alice Fleming as Duchess Wentworth
- Peggy Stewart as Hazel Parker
- Russell Simpson as Colonel Parker
- Dick Curtis as Chopin
- Joel Friedkin as Murphy
- Kenne Duncan as Henchman Felton
- Tom London as Sheriff Peabody
- Monte Hale as Pete
- Wen Wright as The Idaho Kid
- Dickie Dillon as Broken Arrow
- Mary Arden as Stage Passenger
- Jack Kirk as Stage Passenger
