= Wagon Wheels Westward =

1945 film by R. G. Springsteen

- Theatrical release poster
- Directed by: R. G. Springsteen
- Screenplay by: Earle Snell
- Story by: Gerald Geraghty
- Produced by: Sidney Picker
- Starring: Wild Bill Elliott; Robert Blake; Alice Fleming; Linda Stirling; Roy Barcroft; Emmett Lynn
- Cinematography: William Bradford
- Edited by: Fred Allen
- Production company: Republic Pictures
- Distributed by: Republic Pictures
- Release date: December 21, 1945
- Running time: 56 minutes
- Country: United States
- Language: English

Wagon Wheels Westward is a 1945 American Western film in the Red Ryder film series directed by R. G. Springsteen and written by Earle Snell. The film stars Wild Bill Elliott, Robert Blake, Alice Fleming, Linda Stirling, Roy Barcroft and Emmett Lynn. The film was released on December 21, 1945, by Republic Pictures.

== Cast ==
- Wild Bill Elliott as Red Ryder
- Robert Blake as Little Beaver
- Alice Fleming as Martha 'The Duchess' Wentworth
- Linda Stirling as Arlie Adams
- Roy Barcroft as Dave McKean Posing as John Larkin
- Emmett Lynn as Pop Dale
- Dick Curtis as Henchman Tuttle
- Jay Kirby as Bob Adams
- George J. Lewis as Lunsford
- Bud Geary as Fake Sheriff Jeff Brown
- Tom London as Fake Judge James E. Worth
- Kenne Duncan as Henchman Joe
- George Chesebro as Henchman Butch Posing as Tom Sutton
