= Sun Valley Cyclone =

1946 film by R. G. Springsteen

- Theatrical release poster
- Directed by: R. G. Springsteen
- Screenplay by: Earle Snell
- Produced by: Sidney Picker
- Starring: Wild Bill Elliott; Robert Blake; Alice Fleming; Roy Barcroft; Kenne Duncan; Eddy Waller
- Cinematography: Bud Thackery
- Edited by: Charles Craft; Harry Keller
- Production company: Republic Pictures
- Distributed by: Republic Pictures
- Release date: May 10, 1946
- Running time: 56 minutes
- Country: United States
- Language: English

Sun Valley Cyclone is a 1946 American Western film in the Red Ryder film series directed by R. G. Springsteen, written by Earle Snell, and starring Wild Bill Elliott, Robert Blake, Alice Fleming, Roy Barcroft, Kenne Duncan and Eddy Waller. It was released on May 10, 1946, by Republic Pictures.

== Cast ==
- Wild Bill Elliott as Red Ryder
- Alice Fleming as The Duchess
- Robert Blake as Little Beaver
- Monte Hale as Jeff
- Roy Barcroft as Blackie Blake
- Kenne Duncan as Dow
- Eddy Waller as Major Harding
- Tom London as Sheriff
- Edmund Cobb as Luce
- Ed Cassidy as Colonel Roosevelt
- George Chesebro as Shorty
- Rex Lease as Army Sergeant
- Thunder as Red's new Horse
