= Red Ryder =

American comic strip

- A page from Dell Comics' Red Ryder #25 (May–June 1945) reprinting 1943 comic strips by Fred Harman
- Author(s): Stephen Slesinger and Fred Harman
- Current status/schedule: Ended
- Launch date: November 6, 1938
- End date: September 30, 1965
- Syndicate(s): Newspaper Enterprise Association
- Genre: Western

Red Ryder is a Western comic strip created by Stephen Slesinger and artist Fred Harman which served as the basis for a wide array of character merchandising. Syndicated by Newspaper Enterprise Association, the strip ran from Sunday, November 6, 1938, through 1965.

== Red Ryder ==
In 1938, Harman met publisher, writer and comic syndicator Slesinger. At the time, Slesinger had scripted a new comic strip called Red Ryder and was seeking an outstanding Western artist with knowledge of authentic period details and who had a natural gift for drawing scenes from dramatic perspectives. Harman fit the description and was a genuine cowboy who was the ideal spokesperson for the Red Ryder Character franchise.

Slesinger brought Harman to New York and worked with him for a year before Red Ryder was ready to be launched through a carefully planned rollout from comic pages, to movies and radio shows, contests, merchandising tie-ins, and personal appearances by Harman at charity benefits, schools, and civic and Red Ryder youth enrichment events.

Slesinger pioneered the concept of synergy between radio, films, Big Little Books, novels, serial chapters, radio programs, events, rodeos, powwows, commercial tie-ins, and licensed products, such as the Daisy Red Ryder BB Gun, to build brand equity and create lasting and consistent impressions. By the time he launched Red Ryder, Slesinger had already proven his formula for creating evergreen character franchises with characters such as Tarzan, Winnie the Pooh, and many other golden-age newspaper comic characters.

Red Ryder became the longest-running and most popular comic character of the Western genre in movies, radio, comic strips, comic books, mass market retailing, and the collectors' market. Today, Red Ryder has some of the longest business relationships in the history of the licensing industry.

== Toppers ==
Red Ryder had two topper strips on the Sunday page: Little Beaver (Nov 6, 1938 - Aug 25, 1946) and Red Ryder's Corral of Western Lingo (Sept 8, 1946 - Oct 10, 1948).

== Characters and story ==
Fred Harman's Red Ryder (December 27, 1942)

Astride his mighty steed Thunder, Red was a tough cowpoke who lived on Painted Valley Ranch during the 1890s in the Blanco Basin of the San Juan Mountain Range, with his aunt, the Duchess, and his juvenile Native-American sidekick, Little Beaver, who rode his horse, Papoose, when they took off to deal with the bad guys. Little Beaver spoke in the pidgin English now considered an offensive caricature. (His most famous catchphrase was "You betchum, Red Ryder!") Other notable characters were Red's girlfriend, Beth Wilder, arch enemy Ace Hanlon, and ranch hand Buckskin Blodgett.

Harman was eventually acclaimed as one of the finest Western pen-and-ink artists, known for his dramatic sense of perspective and authentic action. Contributing artists and writers worked in Stephen Slesinger, Inc's New York studio and contributed to Red Ryder over the years, including Jim Gary, Edmund Good, John Wade ("Johnnie") Hampton, Robert MacLeod, and Bill Lignanti (of The Palm restaurant fame), Gaylord Du Bois (wrote scripts, circa 1939-1940), and Stephen Slesinger who drew detailed storyboards and scripted and approved all of the stories until he died in 1953, when Shirley Slesinger stepped into her husband's shoes, working closely with Bill Lignanti and Jay Rowland.

Charlie Dye, Johnnie Hampton, Joe Beeler, and George Phippen were co-founders of the Cowboy Artists of America, of which Harman was also a charter member. When Harman left Red Ryder in 1963 to concentrate on his paintings, MacLeod continued writing the story continuity for the strip, with staff artists of Red Ryder Entp., Inc.

Gaylord Du Bois, a prolific comic book writer associated with Slesinger, scripted Red Ryder and Little Beaver for a short period in 1938 and again in the early 1940s.

== Comic books ==
The first appearance of Red Ryder on Dell's Crackajack Funnies #9 (March 1939)

The first Red Ryder comic book was published by Slesinger's Hawley Publications, Inc. in September 1940, followed by Hi-Spot comics for one issue.

Dell Comics launched its Red Ryder in August 1941, changing its title to Red Ryder Ranch Magazine with #145, and then to Red Ryder Ranch Comics with #149. Red Ryder Comics consisted of reprints of the newspaper strip until issue #47 (June 1947), when it began producing original material. Altogether, Red Ryder Comics enjoyed a first run, for a total of 151 issues, ending in 1957, one of the longest continuous newsstand runs in the U.S., for any Western comic. Over the next four decades, under license from Red Ryder, Enterprises, Inc., King Features Syndicate distributed comic reprints translated into 11 languages, while unauthorized translations have been printed in 30 languages. However, by far, the largest circulation for Red Ryder Comics are those produced in Spanish and distributed throughout the Spanish-speaking world. From 1954 to 1984, under an exclusive licensing agreement with Red Ryder Enterprises, Inc., Novaro distributed 474 regular editions plus extras and specials in 21 countries and territories.

== In other media ==
=== Radio ===
The Red Ryder radio series began February 3, 1942, on the Blue Network. broadcast three times a week at 7:30 pm Pacific time. When the Blue also acquired The Lone Ranger from the Mutual Broadcasting System, Mutual decided to compete by airing Red Ryder in the same period. Thus, Red Ryder aired on the East Coast that year from May 20 to September 9 on Mutual. The series beat The Lone Ranger in the Hooper ratings, but the success was short-lived. Red Ryder was sold to a regional sponsor, Langendorf Bread, and after four months was no longer heard in the East.

Mutual and Langendorf continued the series on the West Coast Don Lee Network through the 1940s at 7:30 pm on Tuesdays, Thursdays, and Saturdays, always with the familiar organ theme, "The Dying Cowboy" ("Bury Me Not on the Lone Prairie"). Announcers on the show included Ben Alexander and Art Gilmore.

The continuing characters of the comic strip were also found in the radio series, produced by Brad Brown with writer-director Paul Franklin and writer Albert Van Antwerp. Reed Hadley portrayed Red Ryder on the radio from 1942 to 1944, followed by Carlton KaDell (1945), and Brooke Temple (1946–51). Arthur Q. Bryan had the role of Roland "Rawhide" Rolinson, and Red's sidekick Buckskin was played by Horace Murphy. Jim Mather provided Indian voices.

Numerous actors played Little Beaver, including members of the Hopi, Jicarilla Apache, Southern Ute, and Navajo Nations. One of the most notable was Robert Blake (on credits as Bobby Blake), Tommy Cook (1942 on), Frank Bresee (1942–46, alternating with Cook), Henry Blair (1944–47), Johnny McGovern (1947–50), and Sammy Ogg (1950–51). During the same mid-1940s time frame, Henry Blair also portrayed Ricky Nelson on The Adventures of Ozzie and Harriet.

Billed as "America's famous fighting cowboy," Red Ryder was notable because he did not kill his enemies but instead aimed for their guns to disarm them. Such sound effects were handled by James Dick, Monty Fraser, and Bob Turnbull.

=== Films and television ===
Red Ryder appeared in a 1940 12-chapter serial, followed by a series of 27 movies (the last four of which were in color). It began in 1940 with the 12-chapter Republic movie serial The Adventures of Red Ryder, played by Don "Red" Barry, who got his nickname "Red" from the role and Tommy Cook as Red Ryder's young Indian sidekick Little Beaver. Subsequently, Wild Bill Elliott and Allan "Rocky" Lane portrayed Red Ryder in several films, both working with Robert Blake as Little Beaver. The last four Red Ryder movies starred Jim Bannon as Red Ryder and Don Kay ("Little Brown Jug") Reynolds as Little Beaver. Both Bannon and Lane filmed pilots for a Red Ryder television series, created by Stephen Slesinger, but neither version was picked up by a network. Both pilots survive and appear in various western DVD collections. An episode of Gunsmoke entitled "I Call Him Wonder" was produced in 1963 as a backdoor pilot for a new Red Ryder and Little Beaver TV Show.

==== Republic Pictures ====
Fred Harman's Bronc Peeler (November 4, 1934)

- The Adventures of Red Ryder (1940) (film serial)
- Tucson Raiders (1944)
- Marshal of Reno (1944)
- The San Antonio Kid (1944)
- Cheyenne Wildcat (1944)
- Vigilantes of Dodge City (1944)
- Sheriff of Las Vegas (1944)
- Great Stagecoach Robbery (1945)
- Lone Texas Ranger (1945)
- Phantom of the Plains (1945)
- Marshal of Laredo (1945)
- Colorado Pioneers (1945)
- Wagon Wheels Westward (1945)
- California Gold Rush (1946)
- Sheriff of Redwood Valley (1946)
- Sun Valley Cyclone (1946)
- Conquest of Cheyenne (1946)
- Santa Fe Uprising (1946)
- Stagecoach to Denver (1946)
- Vigilantes of Boomtown (1947)
- Homesteaders of Paradise Valley (1947)
- Oregon Trail Scouts (1947)
- Rustlers of Devil's Canyon (1947)
- Marshal of Cripple Creek (1947)

==== Eagle-Lion Films ====
- Ride, Ryder, Ride! (1949)
- Roll, Thunder, Roll! (1949)
- The Fighting Redhead (1950)
- The Cowboy and the Prizefighter (1950)

==== Telecomics Films ====
Stephen Slesinger's Telecomics Presents produced three television pilots from 1949-1952.

The pilots were filmed on The Little Beaver and Red Ryder Ranches, in Colorado's Blanco Basin, near Pagosa Springs. The Little Beaver Ranch was built, by Slesinger, to resemble a Western Town. Guests stayed in cabins with facades such as The Court House, Saloon, and Jail.

To film a cut-away Cattle Stampede, Slesinger paid local ranchers fifty cents, for each pound their stock lost, as a result of running in the stampede.

In summers Fred Harman's Red Ryder Ranch and Stephen Slesinger's Little Beaver Ranch hosted settlement house boys and other youth. In July 2020 The Red Ryder Cowboy Honor Club celebrates the 80th Anniversary of these outdoor youth programs. 2020 is also the 70th Anniversary year, of the Red Ryder Roundup Rodeo and July Fourth Celebration, in Pagosa Springs.

==== Gunsmoke episode ====
Gunsmoke's 1963 TV Episode "I Call Him Wonder" was an authorized test for a New Red Ryder TV series that was not picked up. It features Little Beaver as Wonder, and is adapted from the original story of how Red Ryder and Little Beaver first met. Red Ryder Enterprises, Inc., retains the copyright and trademark rights to the Red Ryder characters, names, art, and stories.

== Products ==
Slesinger's marketing synergy for Red Ryder and Little Beaver products was trail-blazing. Red Ryder toys; novelties; gifts; accessories; sporting goods; and rugged outdoor, work, and play clothing were sold nationwide and exported by leading North American manufacturers to Europe, Latin America, and as far as Egypt, India, and Japan.

At JC Penney stores across the country, Slesinger created Red Ryder "outposts for dependable American quality and value." These stores within the store were called "Red Ryder Corrals." In addition to educational and sportsmanship contests, special events, and personal appearances, they supplied Red Ryder brand rugged clothing for men and boys. In addition to Red Ryder and Little Beaver outdoor products, licensing included school supplies, lunch kits, and other Red Ryder character hardware and sporting goods.

The outposts also included the Daisy Red Ryder Carbine, which became a father-to-son Christmas gift tradition as memorialized in the 1983 Jean Shepherd film A Christmas Story. The story revolves around the author's childhood memories and a boy trying to get a "Red Ryder Carbine-Action Two-Hundred-Shot Range Model Air Rifle BB gun with a compass in the stock and a thing which tells time" for Christmas. The film was adapted from the autobiographical fiction of Jean Shepherd, by permission of Red Ryder Enterprises, Inc., which owns the Red Ryder trademarks and copyrights.

== Parody ==
Buckaroo Bugs (1944) features Bugs Bunny in the Wild West with "Red Hot Ryder" as his nemesis.

== See also ==
- List of film serials
