= Wild Bill Elliott =

American actor (1904–1965)

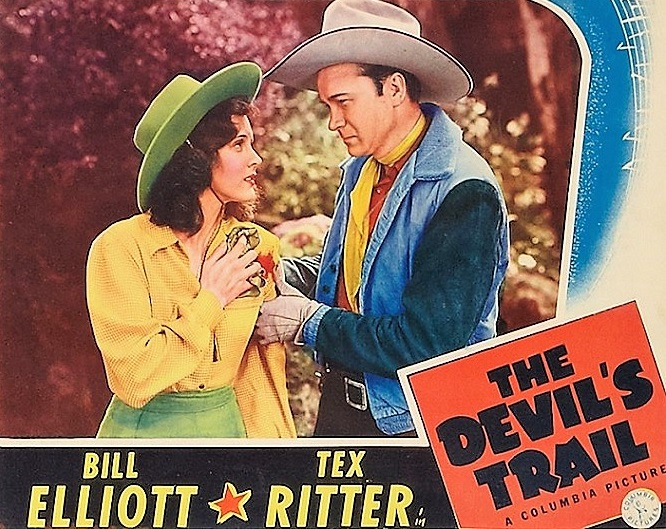
- Lobby card for The Devil's Trail (1942)
- Born: Gordon Nance; October 16, 1904; Pattonsburg, Missouri, U.S.
- Died: November 26, 1965 (aged 61); Las Vegas, Nevada, U.S.
- Other names: Gordon Elliott, William Elliott, Bill Elliott
- Occupation: actor
- Years active: 1925–1957
- Spouses: Helen Josephine Meyer (m. 1927; div. 1961) Dolly Moore (m. 1961)

Wild Bill Elliott (born Gordon Nance, October 16, 1904 – November 26, 1965) was an American film actor. He specialized in playing the rugged heroes of B westerns, particularly the Red Ryder series of films.

== Early life ==
Elliott was born Gordon Nance on a ranch near Pattonsburg, Missouri, the son of Leroy Whitfield Nance, a cattle broker, and his wife, Maude Myrtle Auldridge.

The young Nance grew up within 20 miles of his birthplace; he spent most of his youth on a ranch near King City, Missouri. His father was a cattle rancher and commissioner buyer for the Kansas City stockyards. Riding and roping were part of Nance's upbringing. He won first place in a rodeo event in the 1920 American Royal livestock show. He briefly attended Rockhurst College, a Jesuit school in Kansas City, but soon left for California, hoping to become an actor.

== Career ==
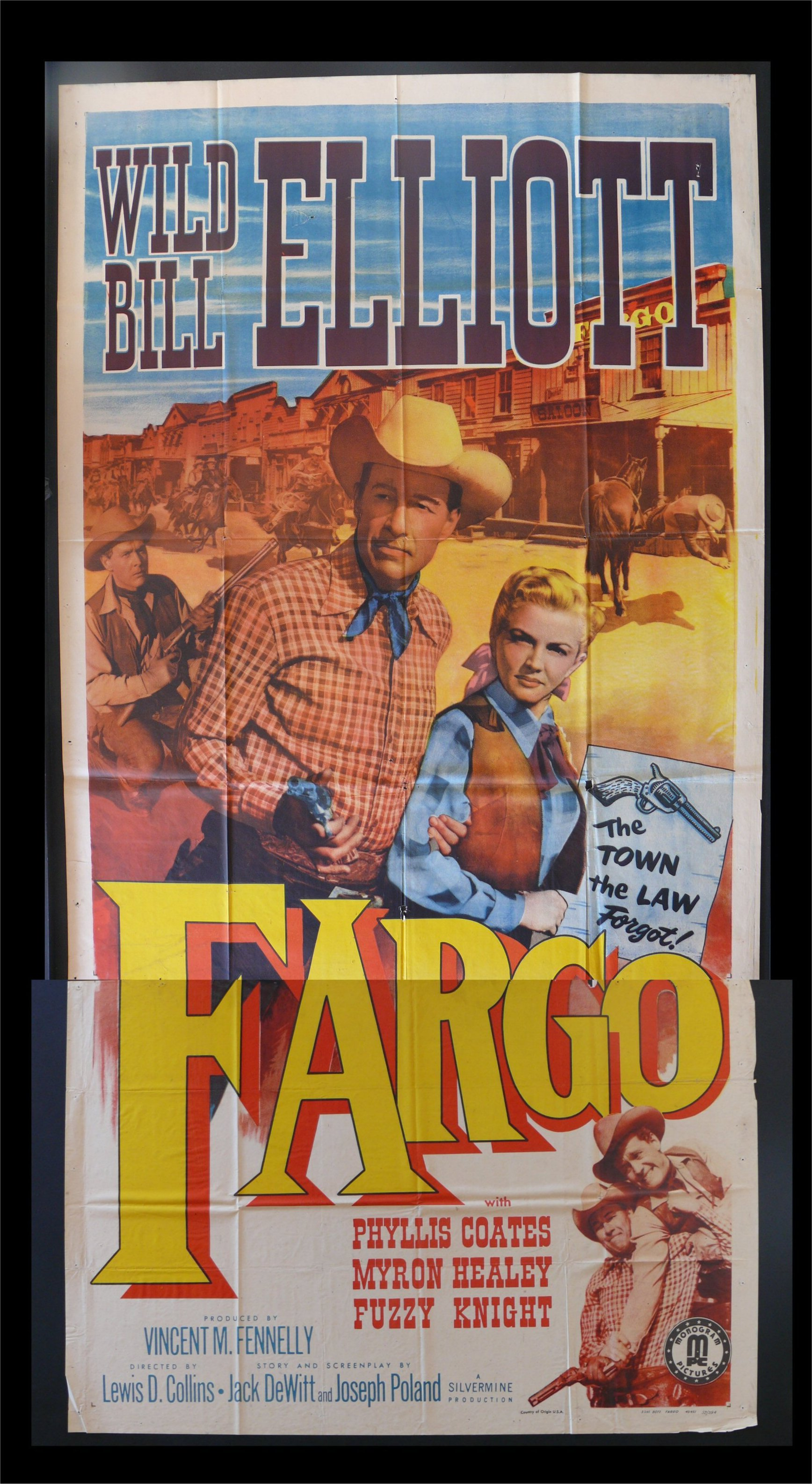
Elliott starred in the 1952 western Fargo.

By 1925, he was getting occasional extra work in films. He took classes at the Pasadena Playhouse and appeared in a few stage roles there. By 1927, he was featured in his first western, The Arizona Wildcat. Several co-starring roles followed, and he renamed himself Gordon Elliott, but as the studios transitioned to sound films, he slipped back into roles as an extra and bit parts, as in Broadway Scandals in 1929. For the next eight years, he appeared in over 100 films for various studios.

From 1932 to 1938 he worked steadily in the Warner Bros. stock company, playing supporting roles in major features, minor features, and short subjects, but he had not yet advanced to starring roles. After leaving Warners, he found work in a couple of westerns for Grand National, which led to his breakthrough role.

== Cowboy star ==
Columbia Pictures offered him the title role in its first self-produced serial, The Great Adventures of Wild Bill Hickok (1938). Although Elliott had been active in pictures for more than 10 years, this was his first lead and Boxoffice magazine hailed him as a new find: "The role of Wild Bill Hickok is particularly fortunate in being filled by a newcomer, Gordon Elliott. He has a fine speaking voice and is slated for bigger things." The serial was so successful, and Elliott so personable, that Columbia promoted him to starring in his own series of western features, as reported by Film Bulletin: "Larry Darmour is replacing Jack Luden with Gordon Elliott. The change may become permanent." It did become permanent, and Gordon Elliott was rechristened Bill Elliott. Within two years, he was listed among the Motion Picture Herald's top 10 western stars, where he would remain for the next 15 years.

After his producer Larry Darmour died in March 1942, Columbia halted Elliott's string of western features and cast him in a serial, The Valley of Vanishing Men. It proved to be Elliott's last work for Columbia.

In 1943, Elliott signed with Republic Pictures, which cast him in a series of westerns alongside George "Gabby" Hayes. The first of these, Calling Wild Bill Elliott, gave Elliott the name by which he would be best known and by which he would be billed almost exclusively for the rest of his career. By this time Elliott had already made three serials for Columbia, and he stipulated in his Republic contract that he would no longer appear in serials.

Republic's new Bill Elliott films caught on quickly, with both the actor and the screen character named Wild Bill Elliott. Meanwhile the studio was re-releasing some old Gene Autry features in which Elliott had appeared. Reed Porter of Motion Picture Herald advised exhibitors to be careful: "The Hollywood theater that had shown Bordertown Gun Fighters [starring Bill Elliott] had it dualed with Boots and Saddles and the audience, first incredulous, then hysterical with mirth, saw Bill Elliott doing heroic deeds of bravado in the former film, and later saw him perform dastardly misdeeds as a small-time villain in the Autry film under his old screen name of Gordon Elliott."

Republic then gave Bill Elliott the role for which he would be best remembered, that of Red Ryder in a series of 16 movies about the famous comic-strip cowboy and his young Indian companion, Little Beaver (played in Elliott's films by Robert Blake). Elliott played the role for only two years but would forever be associated with it. Elliott's trademark was a pair of six guns worn butt-forward in their holsters.

Elliott's career thrived during and after the Red Ryder films. He continued making B westerns into the early 1950s and had his own radio show in the late 1940s.

In an interview with Ben Johnson and Harry Carey Jr., Johnson recalls teaching many actors, including Elliott, to ride a horse. Elliott didn't just learn to ride a horse, but also asked many questions about style and technique. According to Johnson, Elliott became an excellent horseman in his own right while other actors "looked like a sack of walnuts on a horse."

== Later years ==
His final contract as a western star was with Monogram Pictures, where budgets declined as the B western lost its audience to television. When Monogram became Allied Artists Pictures Corporation in 1953, it phased out its western productions, and Elliott finished his contract playing a homicide detective in a series of five modern police dramas, his first non-westerns since 1938. His character was named Andy Flynn in the opener, then Andy Doyle. These were his last feature films.

Elliott retired from films (except for a few TV western pilots, which were not picked up). He worked as a spokesman for Viceroy cigarettes and hosted a local TV program in Las Vegas, Nevada, featuring many of his western films.

== Personal life and death ==
Elliott married Helen Josephine Meyers in February 1927. Their daughter, Barbara Helen Nance, was born October 14, 1927. Elliott and his wife were divorced in 1961. He married Dolly (Herbst) Moore that same year. Following his retirement in 1957, he moved from Los Angeles to Las Vegas, Nevada, where he bought a ranch. He died there from lung cancer on November 26, 1965, aged 61. His ashes are interred in the Eternity Mausoleum at Palm Downtown Mortuary/Cemetery on Main Street in Las Vegas. His wife Dolly is interred in The Lower Devotion Mausoleum in the same cemetery.

== Partial filmography ==
(His 3 serials and 16 Red Ryder films are noted below)

- The Plastic Age (1925) (uncredited)
- The Shamrock Handicap (1926) (uncredited)
- Beyond London Lights (1928)
- Restless Youth (1928)
- The Passion Song (1928)
- Smart Woman (1931) (uncredited)
- Consolation Marriage (1931) (uncredited)
- Left Over Ladies (1931)
- The Final Edition (1932)
- Cocktail Hour (1933) (uncredited)
- The Goose and the Gander (1935)
- Moonlight on the Prairie (1935)
- Trailin' West (1936)
- Boots and Saddles (1937) as Neil
- Speed to Spare (1937)
- Wife, Doctor and Nurse (1937)
- The Lady in the Morgue (1938)
- The Great Adventures of Wild Bill Hickok (1938, serial)
- In Early Arizona (1938)
- Frontiers of '49 (1939)
- Lone Star Pioneers (1939)
- The Law Comes to Texas (1939)
- Overland with Kit Carson (1939, serial)
- The Taming of the West (1939)
- Pioneers of the Frontier (1940)
- The Man from Tumbleweeds (1940)
- The Return of Wild Bill (1940)
- Prairie Schooners (1940)
- Beyond the Sacramento (1940)
- The Wildcat of Tucson (1940)
- Across the Sierras (1941)
- North from the Lone Star (1941)
- The Return of Daniel Boone (1941)
- Hands Across the Rockies (1941)
- The Son of Davy Crockett (1941)
- King of Dodge City (1941)
- Roaring Frontiers (1941)
- The Lone Star Vigilantes (1942)
- Bullets for Bandits (1942)
- North of the Rockies (1942)
- The Devil's Trail (1942)
- Prairie Gunsmoke (1942)
- Vengeance of the West (1942)
- The Valley of Vanishing Men (1942, serial)
- Calling Wild Bill Elliott (1943)
- The Man from Thunder River (1943)
- Wagon Tracks West (1943)
- Bordertown Gun Fighters (1943)
- Death Valley Manhunt (1943)
- Tucson Raiders (1944) featuring Red Ryder
- Marshal of Reno (1944) featuring Red Ryder
- The San Antonio Kid (1944) featuring Red Ryder
- Cheyenne Wildcat (1944) featuring Red Ryder
- Vigilantes of Dodge City (1944) featuring Red Ryder
- Sheriff of Las Vegas (1944) featuring Red Ryder
- Great Stagecoach Robbery (1945) featuring Red Ryder
- Lone Texas Ranger (1945) featuring Red Ryder
- Phantom of the Plains (1945) featuring Red Ryder
- Marshal of Laredo (1945) featuring Red Ryder
- Colorado Pioneers (1945) featuring Red Ryder
- Wagon Wheels Westward (1945) featuring Red Ryder
- California Gold Rush (1946) featuring Red Ryder
- Sheriff of Redwood Valley (1946) featuring Red Ryder
- Sun Valley Cyclone (1946) featuring Red Ryder
- Conquest of Cheyenne (1946) featuring Red Ryder
- Plainsman and the Lady (1946)
- Wyoming (1947)
- The Fabulous Texan (1947)
- Old Los Angeles (1948)
- The Gallant Legion (1948)
- Hellfire (1949)
- The Last Bandit (1949)
- The Savage Horde (1950)
- The Showdown (1950)
- The Longhorn (1951)
- Fargo (1952)
- Waco (1952)
- Kansas Territory (1952)
- The Maverick (1952)
- The Homesteaders (1953)
- Rebel City (1953)
- Topeka (1953)
- Vigilante Terror (1953)
- The Forty-Niners (1954)
- Dial Red O (1955)
- Sudden Danger (1955)
- Calling Homicide (1956)
- Chain of Evidence (1957)
- Footsteps in the Night (1957)
