= Bud Geary =

American actor (1898–1946)

- Born: Sigsbee Maine Geary; February 15, 1898; Salt Lake City, Utah, U.S.
- Died: February 22, 1946 (aged 48); Hollywood, Los Angeles, California, U.S.

Bud Geary (born Sigsbee Maine Geary; February 15, 1898 – February 22, 1946), was an American film actor. He appeared in 258 films between years 1920 and 1946.

== Early life and career ==
Born in Salt Lake City, Utah, to Charles Geary and Jenny Helen, Geary was born the same day the US Maine was sunk, which accounts for both his middle name and his first, in honor of the ship's captain, Charles Dwight Sigsbee.

== Personal life and death ==
Geary married at least four times: in 1922 to Edgarita Clark Williams, with whom he had two sons; to Julie Blake in 1930, Lorraine Myrtle De Sart in 1936, and Blanche May Luff in 1939. He died in Hollywood, California, aged 48. His remains are interred at Forest Lawn Memorial Park in Glendale, California.

== Partial filmography ==
- Everyman's Price (1921)
- Robin Hood (1922)
- Why Women Remarry (1923)
- The Scarlet Honeymoon (1925)
- Soft Living (1928)
- The Flying Fleet (1929)
- Shipmates (1931)
- The Circus Queen Murder (1933)
- The Meanest Gal in Town (1934)
- The Spider's Web (1938)
- Mysterious Doctor Satan (1940)
- Secret Service in Darkest Africa (1943)
- Thundering Trails (1943)
- Sheriff of Sundown (1944)
- Tucson Raiders (1944)
- Marshal of Reno (1944)
- The San Antonio Kid (1944)
- Cheyenne Wildcat (1944)
- Vigilantes of Dodge City (1944)
- Sheriff of Las Vegas (1944)
- Great Stagecoach Robbery (1945)
- Lone Texas Ranger (1945)
- Phantom of the Plains (1945)
- Marshal of Laredo (1945)
- Colorado Pioneers (1945)
- Wagon Wheels Westward (1945)
- The Cherokee Flash (1945)
- The Purple Monster Strikes (1945)
- The Crimson Ghost (1946)
- California Gold Rush (1946)
- Sheriff of Redwood Valley (1946)
- Sun Valley Cyclone (1946)
- Conquest of Cheyenne (1946)
- Santa Fe Uprising (1946)
