= Tom Steele (stuntman) =

Scottish stuntman and actor (1909–1990)

- Born: Thomas Skeoch; June 12, 1909; Carluke, South Lanarkshire, Scotland
- Died: October 30, 1990 (aged 81); Los Angeles, California
- Education: Stanford University
- Years active: 1934–1986

Tom Steele (born Thomas Skeoch, 12 June 1909 – 30 October 1990) was a stunt man and actor, best remembered for appearing in serials, especially those produced by Republic Pictures, in both capacities.

== Early life ==
Born in Scotland, he was the son of a construction consulting engineer. Steele came to America with his family at an early age, settling in Northern California. A very skilled horseman, he played polo competitively as a young man and also worked for a time in a steel mill, which was the source of his professional name Tom "Steele."

Steele was a student at Stanford University, where he had a football scholarship.

== Film career ==
At the start of the Depression he relocated to Hollywood to become an actor, and made his film debut in 1930 in the Western The Lone Star Ranger. But soon Steele, relying on his skill as a horseman (he had played polo professionally with the San Mateo Redcoats), changed to stunts for better money and regular work. Despite this he can be seen playing many bit parts throughout his career, mostly as "heavies" or minor henchmen, whose main role was to be part of a fight scene. His visible but non-speaking role as a prison guard in 1947's Brute Force is a good example of this.

During the 1930s Steele worked frequently at Universal with a group of fellow stuntmen who called themselves "The Cousins." None were related, but they all pitched in to help each other with their gags and refine the art of stuntwork. Steele, in fact, is credited with the idea of wearing stunt pads, which he first fashioned from old football padding. The Cousins also included David Sharpe, Carey Loftin, Eddie Parker, Ken Terrell, Bud Wolfe, Louis Tomei and Loren Riebe. Steele and Sharpe were still working together well into the 1970s on such films as Blazing Saddles (Steele is the townsman who falls out of his chair at the sight of Sheriff Bart, and Sharpe is the man flipped and dragged through the mud by the villains).

Steele took over from Sharpe as stunt coordinator at Republic when Sharpe left to serve in World War II in 1942 (Steele himself was declared 4-F due to an old injury incurred at the steel mill). Steele was the only stuntman ever to be signed to a term contract (June 1943-June 1944) by Republic. He doubled for such serial leading men as Rod Cameron (who started as a stuntman himself), Richard Bailey (who rather resembled Steele), Clayton Moore, and football star Sammy Baugh. In the 1940s and early 1950s, many actors at Republic were selected due to their resemblance to Steele rather than the opposite.

In features, Steele was Wild Bill Elliott's regular double. His most notable role at Republic was as the title hero in the 1943 serial The Masked Marvel, for which he ironically received no billing whatsoever (the character was supposed to be one of four leading men—none of whom were Steele). As the Masked Marvel Steele's voice, which was a rather light, high tenor not unlike Henry Fonda's, was dubbed by the more heroic-sounding radio actor Gayne Whitman.

Steele also worked extensively outside of Republic, appearing in feature films as Charge of the Light Brigade (1936), Santa Fe Trail ('40), in which he doubled Raymond Massey, The Big Sleep doubling for John Ridgeley, and The Thing (From Another World) standing in for James Arness as the title creature in the scenes involving fire and a dog attack, and Citizen Kane, with Steele playing an aggressive reporter jumping on the running board of Kane's car.

== Later life ==
In the 1960s and 70s he remained active as a stuntman but took on more acting bits, including a role as a truck driver in 1966's Harper and a bit as a security guard in the 1971 Bond epic Diamonds Are Forever. He also drove one of the vehicles used in the classic car chase from Bullitt (1968) and did driving stunts for Disney's late-1960s "Love Bug" films. His last film before retiring was 1986's Tough Guys, in which he played an elderly man caught up in a bank robbery.

In his last years, Steele was a frequent participant at Western and Serial film festivals around the country.

== Partial filmography ==
- Bill Cracks Down (1937)
- Enemy Agent (1940)
- Texas to Bataan (1942)
- The Masked Marvel (1943)
- Diamonds Are Forever (1971) - W Technologies Gate Guard (uncredited)
