= Beat the Band =

Beat the Band may refer to:

- Beat the Band (film), 1947 RKO Pictures film directed by John H. Auer and based on the musical
- Beat the Band (musical), 1942 Broadway musical with music by Johnny Green, lyrics by George Marion Jr., and a book co-authored by Marion and George Abbott
- Beat the Band (quiz show), musical quiz show heard on NBC radio from 1940 to 1944
- "Beat the Band", a 2011 song by Tim Easton

== See also ==
- To Beat the Band, 1935 American romantic comedy film
