= Bill Armstrong (announcer) =

American television announcer (1932–2000)

- Born: William Armstrong; January 19, 1932; Gloucester, Massachusetts, U.S.
- Died: January 2, 2000 (aged 67); Frazier Park, California, U.S.
- Occupation(s): Television announcer Game show host
- Years active: 1974-1998

William Armstrong (born January 19, 1932, Gloucester, Massachusetts – January 2, 2000, Frazier Park, California) was an American television game show announcer and producer. He produced The Hollywood Squares for several years, and later was a business partner with Squares host Peter Marshall in a production company. He received two Emmy Award nominations as producer of Hollywood Squares.

Armstrong also co-produced and announced on Celebrity Sweepstakes and The Reel to Reel Picture Show. During the 1974-75 season, Armstrong served as host of KTLA's Liar's Club, a role he continued in its first year of syndication, and would later serve as announcer for the first half of the 1988 revival.

He was executive producer of the 1987-88 syndicated dating series Matchmaker, for which he occasionally announced as well.

== Credits ==
- Celebrity Sweepstakes — announcer
- Stumpers! — announcer
- Liar's Club — host (1976-1977), announcer (1988)
- Fantasy — announcer
- The Reel to Reel Picture Show — announcer
