= Ding Dong Williams =

1946 film by William A. Berke

- Theatrical release poster
- Directed by: William Berke
- Screenplay by: Brenda Weisberg; M. Coates Webster
- Based on: Strictly Ding Dong story in Collier's by Richard English
- Produced by: Herman Schlom
- Starring: Glenn Vernon; Marcy McGuire; Felix Bressart; Anne Jeffreys; James Warren
- Cinematography: Frank Redman
- Edited by: Les Millbrook
- Music by: Constantin Bakaleinikoff (director); Leigh Harline (scoring)
- Production company: RKO Radio Pictures
- Distributed by: RKO Radio Pictures
- Release date: April 15, 1946
- Running time: 61 minutes
- Country: United States
- Language: English

Ding Dong Williams is a 1946 American comedy film directed by William Berke. The film stars Glen Vernon (under his real name, Glenn Vernon), Marcy McGuire, Felix Bressart, Anne Jeffreys, and James Warren. It was released on April 15, 1946 by RKO Radio Pictures.

== Plot ==
Hollywood's Sunrise Studios is producing a film about a heartbroken composer who creates a modern rhapsody. The head of the music department, Hugo Meyerhold, and his young secretary Angela Jones engage jive clarinetist Ding Dong Williams. However, Ding Dong's musical skills are limited to improvisation; he can't read or write music and just plays music the way he feels at the moment. Angela tries various schemes to induce Ding Dong to play something sad and soulful, including having two arrangers secretly transcribing his improvisations, and staging a fake romance with the studio's cowboy star, but all of her attempts fail. Ding Dong, dressed down by the studio boss and disillusioned by life in Hollywood, watches Meyerhold conducting pianist Richard Korbel and the studio orchestra playing Chopin's Fantaisie Impromptu. At the rear of the recording stage, the melancholy Ding Dong thoughtlessly begins to play a blue counterpoint to the orchestra. Angela sees this and has the director position a microphone above Ding Dong. The counterpoint melody is exactly what the studio boss wants, and all ends happily.

== Cast ==
- Glenn Vernon as Ding Dong Williams
- Marcy McGuire as Angela Jones
- Felix Bressart as Hugo Meyerhold
- Anne Jeffreys as Vanessa Page
- James Warren as Steve Moore, cowboy star
- William B. Davidson as Saul Dana, studio head
- Cliff Nazarro as Zing, arranger
- Tommy Noonan as Zang, arranger
- Ruth Lee as Laura Cooper, gossip columnist
- Jason Robards, Sr. as Kenmore, director
- Bob Nolan as himself
- Sons of the Pioneers as themselves
- Tanis Chandler as Nightclub Hostess
- Robert Clarke as Nightclub Bandleader
- Constantin Bakaleinikoff as himself
- Richard Korbel as Piano Specialty
- Myrna Dell as Nightclub Blonde
- Edmund Glover as Western Director
- Harry Harvey as Sound Engineer

== Production ==
Ding Dong Williams was based on a series of stories by Richard English, published in Collier's magazine, chronicling the comic adventures of a young musician. The musical-comedy script was assigned to Brenda Weisberg, who excelled in teenage stories (she initiated Universal's Little Tough Guys series and wrote for Columbia's Rusty series) and M. Coates Webster, a specialist in stories for "B" musicals.

Ding Dong Williams was filmed in 1945 as a vehicle for RKO's promising young star Glenn Vernon. The studio had cast Vernon opposite its resident rambunctious teenager Marcy McGuire in the B comedy Sing Your Way Home, and hoped to create in Vernon and McGuire a musical-comedy team like Mickey Rooney and Judy Garland. The working title of the new picture was originally Strictly Ding Dong (the title of one of Richard English's books), then Meet Ding Dong Williams, and the 62-minute B comedy was supposed to be the first in a new series. Meanwhile, the studio had set the Leon Errol comedy Riverboat Rhythm as the next Vernon-McGuire picture. However, the temperamental McGuire saw the Errol script and resented the size of her role. She voiced her objections to her bosses, insisting that she be cast in leading musical roles. RKO responded by dismissing McGuire and canceling any plans for a series. The studio allowed talk of the new team to fade into memory, and kept the unreleased Ding Dong Williams on the shelf. Because the series idea was abandoned, the Meet Ding Dong Williams title was shortened, and Ding Dong Williams was finally released in April 1946 to favorable reviews in Motion Picture Herald, Motion Picture Daily, and Variety.

Although Ding Dong Williams never became a series, it did inspire a spinoff series. In Ding Dong Williams James Warren played a slow-witted movie cowboy with a palomino horse called Star Dust. RKO had been making Zane Grey westerns with Robert Mitchum in the leading roles, but with Mitchum advancing to dramatic features, Ding Dong Williams producer Herman Schlom remembered how well Warren had photographed in western gear. Warren took over the Zane Grey series, and because Ding Dong Williams was still awaiting release, film audiences became familiar with Warren and Star Dust well before they had viewed Ding Dong Williams.

Ding Dong Williams was the only motion picture credit for 11-year-old concert pianist Richard Korbel (December 27, 1933 – January 13, 2013). He returned to the concert stage, and in 1949 the 15-year-old Korbel gave a recital at Carnegie Hall after an absence of three years. The New York Times said of Korbel's interpretation of the Liszt Sonata: "Having the technical facility of the born pianist, its difficulties never troubled him, and his intuitive feeling for the music enabled him to re-create it as if it were his own composition."

Ding Dong Williams proved to be a convenient film for RKO to program wherever a musical attraction was needed. It was still playing profitably as a first-run feature in July 1947, as reported in Variety by a Los Angeles correspondent: "Ding Dong Williams is being pushed to a fancy $25,000 [for the week] at the Million Dollar theatre due to power generated by Cab Calloway's orch [sic] on stage."
