= Glen Vernon =

American actor

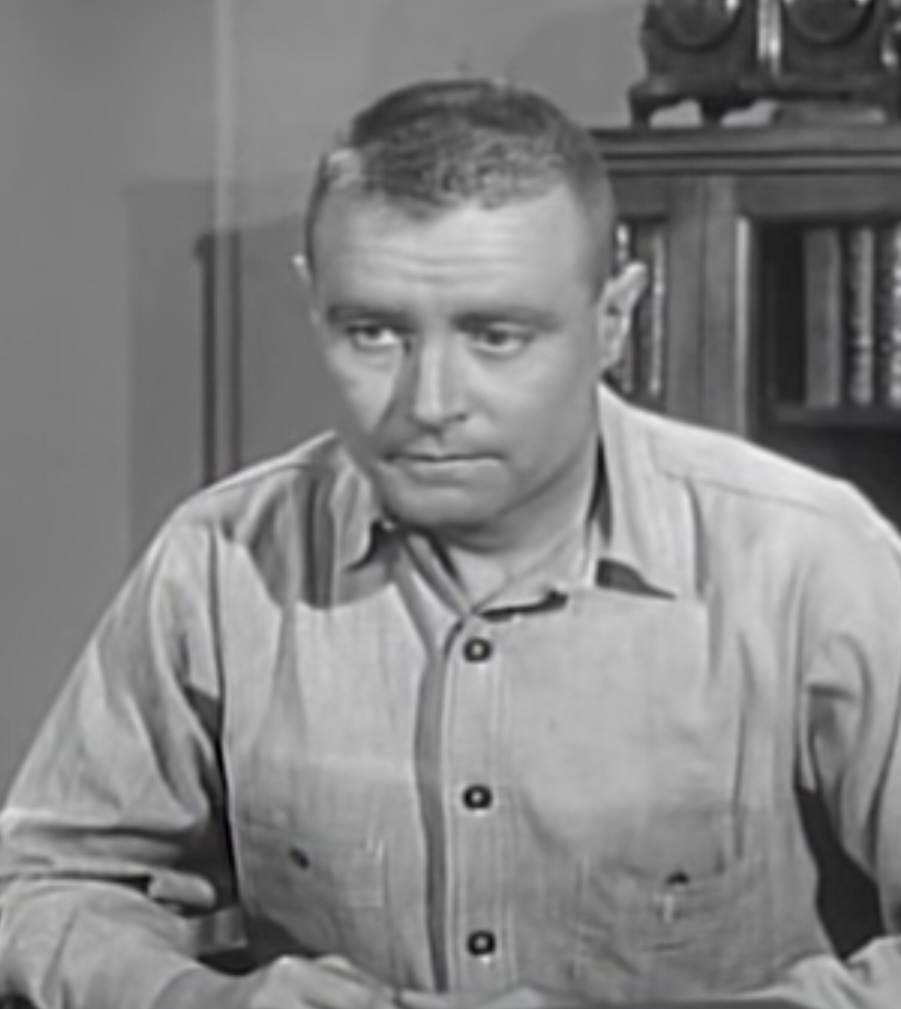
- Vernon in an episode of The Public Defender (1955)
- Born: Elmer Vernon, Jr. October 27, 1923; Fall River, Massachusetts, U.S.
- Died: October 27, 1999 (aged 76); Woodland Hills, Los Angeles, U.S.
- Occupation: Actor
- Years active: 1944-1999

Glen Vernon (born Elmer Vernon, Jr., also known professionally as Glenn Vernon, October 27, 1923 – October 27, 1999) was an American actor.

== Early life ==
Vernon hailed from Fall River, Massachusetts, and joined his father Elmer Vernon's song-and-dance vaudeville act at the age of six. The elder Vernon split up the act, studying accountancy while sending his son to New York to study acting at the American Academy of Dramatic Arts. Vernon, Jr. took various odd jobs while in New York. He recalled, "One of them was hustling film back and forth between a downtown exchange and a newsreel theater on upper Broadway." His first stage job was as a "Dancing Boy" in the George Abbott musical Best Foot Forward, under his real name of Elmer Vernon.

== Career ==
He soon became established as a reliable stage juvenile; in August 1942 he took a leading role in the road company of Max Gordon's Broadway production of Junior Miss. In 1943 he was recruited by Casey Robinson of RKO Radio Pictures to play a sensitive Russian soldier in the film Days of Glory. Signed to a term contract and rechristened "Glenn Vernon", he went on to play featured roles in dramas, comedies, and musicals, among them Youth Runs Wild, Step Lively,Those Endearing Young Charms, Bedlam, Riverboat Rhythm, and The Woman on the Beach. Vernon and his parents settled in Southern California.

The RKO studio often offered its own version of another studio's popular property. When Universal Pictures had Abbott and Costello, RKO's answer was Brown and Carney. In the musical-comedy field, Universal had Donald O'Connor and Peggy Ryan while Metro-Goldwyn-Mayer had Mickey Rooney and Judy Garland. RKO teamed its popular young players Glenn Vernon and Marcy McGuire. This pairing resulted in two features, the second being Glenn Vernon's only leading role: a hapless jazz clarinetist who can't read music, in the Hollywood-themed feature Ding Dong Williams (filmed in 1945). The third Vernon-McGuire film was to be the Leon Errol feature Riverboat Rhythm, but McGuire objected to the size of her role. After McGuire angrily petitioned her bosses for her own starring vehicles, RKO released her from the payroll and dissolved the Vernon-McGuire series. RKO waited for almost a year for the public to forget the Vernon-McGuire team, and finally released Ding Dong Williams in the spring of 1946. Vernon recruited his Broadway co-star Joan Newton to replace McGuire in Riverboat Rhythm. Vernon and Newton were to co-star in a romantic comedy, Growing Pains, which was never made.

When tycoon Howard Hughes bought the RKO studio, many of the resident contract players were dismissed; Vernon left the studio in 1947. He returned to the stage, playing in Los Angeles-area productions. He resumed his screen career as a freelance actor, mostly for the independent studios Republic, Monogram, and Lippert.

In 1949 the young actor married Ruth Heinen, who handled scripts at 20th Century-Fox.

In 1950, now billed as "Glen Vernon," he was a song-and-dance man in the vaudeville revue Hollywood Varieties and played a drunken wastrel in Lucky Losers with The Bowery Boys. His movie career never regained its wartime momentum, but he continued to play small roles in motion pictures and television. According to his son Jeff Vernon, "The acting, it took kind of a back seat because he had a family now. He wasn't getting quite as many roles because he was starting to get a little older; the juvenile look was kind of leaving. He started working for the West Coast advertising for the Hollywood Reporter. He had a really good position, but he met so many different people that the would still get offered little parts, and the Hollywood Reporter was cool with him going and doing little parts."

One of his fellow players from Ding Dong Williams, Tommy Noonan, remembered Vernon's calm screen demeanor and cast him as an Army chaplain in his 1959 production The Rookie. On television, he portrayed a bellboy in the 1961 episode "The Big Spender" of the television series Window on Main Street, starring Robert Young. He also made two brief appearances on the Perry Mason series (one as a ship steward, the other as a plainclothes detective).

In the 1980s and 1990s, Vernon was cast as quaint old men, in films (So I Married an Axe Murderer) and television (Doogie Howser, M.D.,The Golden Girls).

Today's audiences may recognize Glenn Vernon from a movie he never actually made: near the beginning of the famous RKO feature It's a Wonderful Life, when the pharmacist Mr. Gower gazes at a picture of his deceased son, it's a photo of Glenn Vernon. His son Jeff recalled, "At the time he didn't think much of it at all. He went, 'Yeah, well, okay, use my picture. I mean, who's even going to see it?'"

== Death ==
Vernon died in Woodland Hills, Los Angeles, from complications of a stroke, on October 27, 1999 – his 76th birthday.

== Filmography ==
Year	Title	Role	Notes
1944	Days of Glory	Mitya	
1944	Marine Raiders	Marine in Recording Booth	Uncredited
1944	Step Lively	Bellboy	Uncredited
1944	Youth Runs Wild	Frankie Hauser	
1945	Those Endearing Young Charms	Radioman 1st Class William Zantifar	
1945	Mama Loves Papa	Delivery Boy	Uncredited
1945	Sing Your Way Home	Jimmy McCue	
1946	Ding Dong Williams	Ding Dong Williams	leading role, filmed 1945
1946	Riverboat Rhythm	John Beeler	
1946	Bedlam	The Gilded Boy	
1946	The Bamboo Blonde	Shorty Parker	
1947	The Devil Thumbs a Ride	Jack Kenny, Gas Station Attendant	
1947	The Woman on the Beach	Kirk	
1948	Heart of Virginia	Bud Landeen	
1948	Beyond Glory	Yearling in Mess Hall	Uncredited
1949	Impact	Ed	
1949	Sands of Iwo Jima	Marine	Uncredited
1950	Hollywood Varieties	Minstrel act with partner Eddie Ryan	
1950	Lucky Losers	Andrew Stone III	
1951	Belle Le Grand	Bellboy	
1951	The Wild Blue Yonder	Crewman	Uncredited
1952	The Rose Bowl Story	Student Manager	Uncredited
1952	Flat Top	Sailor	Uncredited
1952	Thunderbirds	Driver	Uncredited
1953	The Stars Are Singing	Bit Role	Uncredited
1956	Miracle in the Rain	Master of Ceremonies	Uncredited
1958	I Bury the Living	Stuart Drexel	Uncredited
1959	The Rookie	Army Chaplain	Uncredited
1961	Breakfast at Tiffany's	Reporter	Uncredited
1965	I Saw What You Did	John Adams	
1969	The Love God?	Mayor	Uncredited
1974	Airport 1975	Passenger	Uncredited
1990	Spaced Invaders	Old Guy #1	
1993	So I Married an Axe Murderer	Uncle Angus	
1999	Eating L.A.	Street Preacher	
