= Marcy McGuire =

American actress and contralto singer (1926–2021)

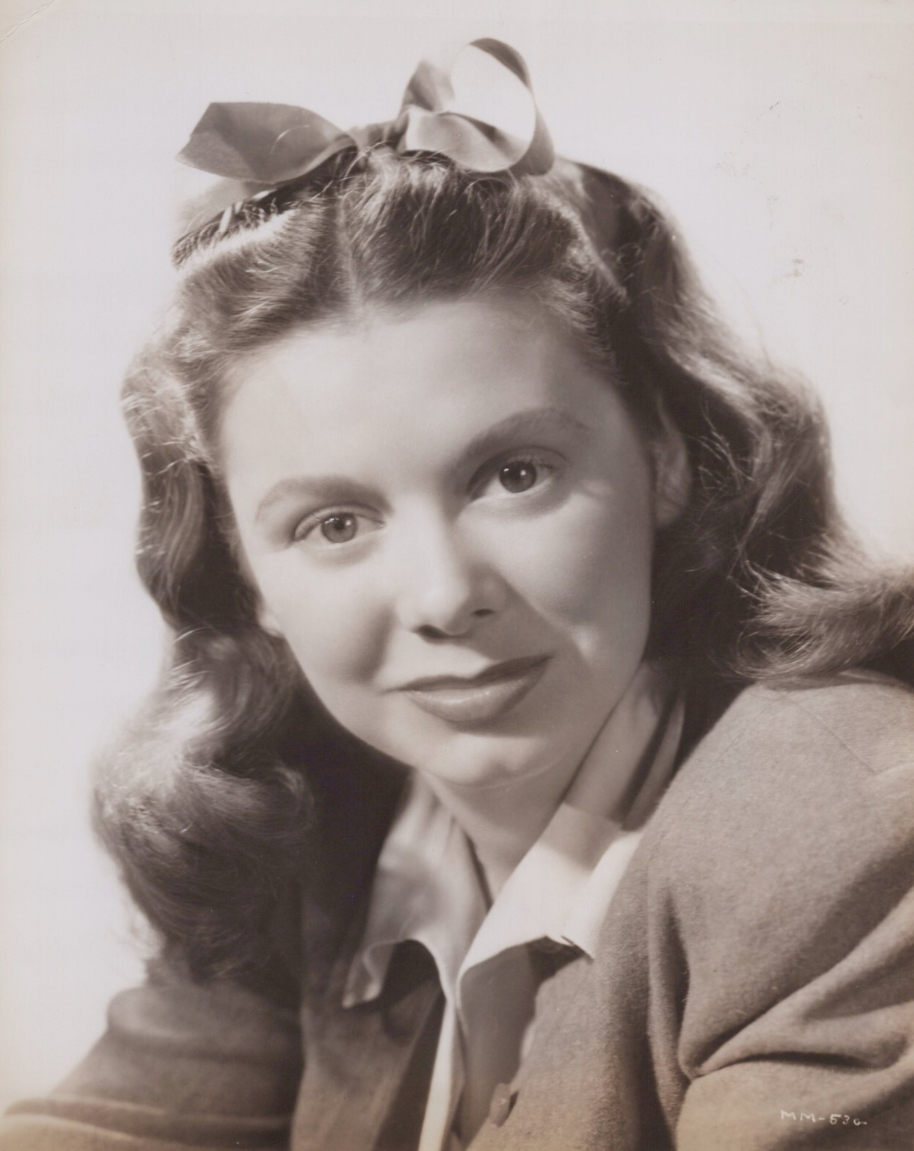
- McGuire in 1945
- Born: Marilyn Jeanne McGuire; February 22, 1926; Kansas City, Kansas, U.S.
- Died: August 7, 2021 (aged 95); Palm Desert, California, U.S.
- Occupations: Film actress, singer-songwriter
- Years active: 1942–1963
- Spouse: Wally Cassell (m. 1947; died 2015)
- Children: 2

Marcy McGuire (born Marilyn Jeanne McGuire, February 22, 1926 – August 7, 2021) was an American actress and contralto singer who was active in the 1940s.

== Life and career ==
McGuire was born on February 22, 1926, to James Joseph McGuire, a film projectionist and Annona (née Crowley) McGuire. Her parents divorced in the early 1930s, while McGuire was still a child.

Syndicated columnist J. D. Spiro recounted her entry into motion pictures: "Marcy, a freckled little lass from Kansas City, was brought to Hollywood early in 1942 by Tim Whelan, director, who first saw her entertaining in a Chicago nightclub, gave her a screen test with a 16-millimeter camera in the diner of the Santa Fe Chief as it was about to pull out for California. A few weeks later Whelan was directing her as she began her screen career in Seven Days Leave." She had a featured role in Frank Sinatra's first film, Higher and Higher (1943).

The RKO studio often offered its own version of another studio's popular property. When Universal Pictures had Abbott and Costello, RKO's answer was Brown and Carney. In the musical-comedy field, Universal had Donald O'Connor and Peggy Ryan while Metro-Goldwyn-Mayer had Mickey Rooney and Judy Garland. RKO teamed its popular young players Glenn Vernon and Marcy McGuire. The ambitious McGuire confided her feelings to Vernon: "I don't see why RKO doesn't do for me what MGM has done for Judy Garland." Vernon encouraged her: "When you do as much for RKO as Judy has for MGM, maybe it will."

This pairing resulted in two features, Sing Your Way Home (1945) and the Hollywood-themed feature Ding Dong Williams (filmed in 1945). The third Vernon-McGuire film was to be the Leon Errol feature Riverboat Rhythm, but McGuire objected to the size of her role. "Something made the young lady extremely unhappy about her situation at RKO," reported columnist Spiro. "Just what happened in the RKO front office following this development is one of those things no one will say much about for publication, but today Marcy no longer has an RKO contract, and the studio says she asked for and got her release from it." RKO waited for almost a year for the public to forget the Glenn Vernon-Marcy McGuire team, and finally released Ding Dong Williams in the spring of 1946.

McGuire moved on to MGM during the summer of 1946, reuniting with Frank Sinatra for It Happened in Brooklyn (released 1947). She got married in 1947 to actor Wally Cassell in 1947, and cut back on her screen career. She appeared very occasionally in only three more films: You Gotta Stay Happy (Universal, 1948) with James Stewart; Jumping Jacks (Paramount, 1952), with Dean Martin and Jerry Lewis; and Summer Magic (Walt Disney, 1963), with Hayley Mills and Burl Ives.

== Later life ==
McGuire was married to Wally Cassell from 1947 until his death in 2015 at 103. The couple had two children. She died in Palm Desert, California on August 7, 2021, at the age of 95. News of her death was only made public in August 2022, by film historians Austin and Howard Mutti-Mewse.

== Filmography ==
Year	Title	Role
1942	Seven Days' Leave	Mickey Havelock-Allen
1943	Around the World	Herself
1943	Higher and Higher	Mickey
1944	Career Girl	Louise
1944	Seven Days Ashore	Dot Diamond
1945	Sing Your Way Home	Bridget Forrester
1946	Ding Dong Williams	Angela Jones
1947	It Happened in Brooklyn	Rae Jakobi
1948	You Gotta Stay Happy	Georgia Goodrich
1952	Jumping Jacks	Julia Loring
1963	Summer Magic	Ellen
