= Tommy Noonan =

American actor, screenwriter and producer (1921–1968)

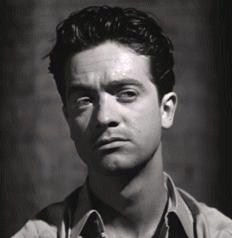
- Noonan in Dick Tracy (1945)
- Born: Thomas Patrick Noone; April 29, 1921; Bellingham, Washington, U.S.
- Died: April 24, 1968 (aged 46); Los Angeles, California, U.S.
- Resting place: San Fernando Mission Cemetery
- Occupations: Actor, comedian
- Years active: 1934–1967
- Spouses: Lucile Barnes (m. 1947; div. 1952) Carole Langley (m. 1952)
- Children: 6
- Relatives: John Ireland (half-brother)

Tommy Noonan (born Thomas Patrick Noone; April 29, 1921 – April 24, 1968) was an American actor, comedian, screenwriter and producer. He acted in a number of high-profile films as well as B movies from the 1940s through the 1960s; he is best known for his supporting performances as Gus Esmond, wealthy fiancé of Lorelei Lee (Marilyn Monroe), in Gentlemen Prefer Blondes (1953), and as musician Danny McGuire in A Star Is Born (1954).

== Early years ==
Noonan was born in Bellingham, Washington, the younger half-brother of actor John Ireland.

His father, Michael Joseph Noone, was an Irish vaudeville comedian and a native of Dunmore, County Galway, and his mother, Gracie Ferguson, was a Scottish piano teacher from Glasgow, Lanarkshire. He attended New York University.

== Career ==
In 1934, Noonan and John Ireland made their stage debuts with a New York-based experimental theatre. They later appeared together in three films, including I Shot Jesse James (1949).

Noonan had a repertory company of his own prior to the Second World War. On Broadway, he appeared in How to Make a Man (1960) and Men to the Sea (1944).

After serving in the U.S. Navy during World War II, he made his film debut in George White's Scandals (1945).

He teamed with Peter Marshall to form a comedy team in the late 1940s. (Noonan's half-brother John Ireland was married to Marshall's sister Joanne Dru.) Their performances were limited because they continued their individual careers, "working together only when both were available at the same time". As Noonan and Marshall, they appeared on television, nightclubs, and in the films Starlift, FBI Girl (both 1951), The Rookie (1959), and Swingin' Along (1962). They also wrote for other comics, including Rowan and Martin, which led to Marshall holding a lifelong grudge against Dan Rowan after Noonan fell ill near the end of his life and Rowan paid Noonan almost no attention. The duo went their separate ways after the release of Swingin' Along.

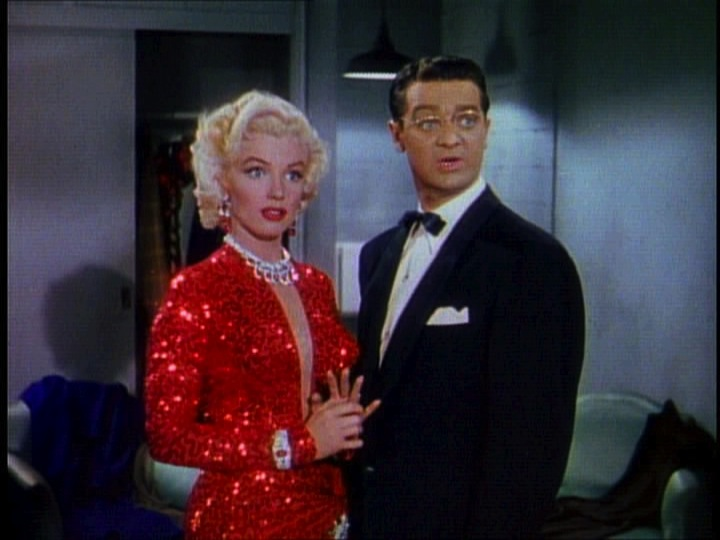
Marilyn Monroe with Tommy Noonan in Gentlemen Prefer Blondes (1953)

In 1953, Noonan appeared in the musical Gentlemen Prefer Blondes as Gus Esmond, the nerdy fiancé of Marilyn Monroe's character Lorelei Lee. The following year, he played Danny McGuire, Judy Garland's bandmate, accompanist and friend, in the Warner Brothers film A Star Is Born. He also played a voyeuristic bank manager in the Richard Fleischer film noir melodrama Violent Saturday in 1955.

In 1961, Noonan appeared on the CBS courtroom drama Perry Mason as the defendant and episode's title character, comedian Charlie Hatch, in "The Case of the Crying Comedian".

In the early 1960s he appeared in a few B movies, including Promises! Promises! (1963) with Jayne Mansfield and 3 Nuts in Search of a Bolt (1964) with Mamie Van Doren, which he also directed, wrote and produced. His last effort as a producer was Cottonpickin' Chickenpickers (1967), which was also Sonny Tufts' last movie.

== Personal life ==
Noonan was married five times. His last wife was actress Carole Langley, whose stage name was Pocahontas Crowfoot; they were married 16 years and had four children. Noonan also had a daughter from his first marriage and son from his second marriage.

== Death ==
Eight months after an operation for a brain tumour, Noonan died in 1968 at the Motion Picture & Television Country House and Hospital, just a few days before his 47th birthday.

== Partial filmography ==
- Boys Town (1938) - Red (uncredited)
- George White's Scandals (1945) - Joe (uncredited)
- Dick Tracy (1945) - Johnny Moko (uncredited)
- Riverboat Rhythm (1946) - Colonial Hotel Bartender (uncredited)
- From This Day Forward (1946) - Maxie - Refreshment Stand Counterman (uncredited)
- Ding Dong Williams (1946) - Zang
- Bedlam (1946) - 1st Stonemason (uncredited)
- The Truth About Murder (1946) - Jonesy
- The Bamboo Blonde (1946) - Art Department
- Step by Step (1946) - Counterman (uncredited)
- Crack-Up (1946) - Bonbon Vendor (uncredited)
- Criminal Court (1946) - Cab Driver (uncredited)
- Vacation in Reno (1946) - War Surplus Outlet Employee (uncredited)
- Beat the Band (1947) - Toby (uncredited)
- Lost Honeymoon (1947) - Roughneck (uncredited)
- The Big Fix (1947) - Andy Rawlins
- A Likely Story (1947) - Taxi Driver (uncredited)
- Born to Kill (1947) - Bellboy (uncredited)
- Riffraff (1947) - First Down-and-Outer at Cabaret (uncredited)
- The Hal Roach Comedy Carnival (1947) - Elevator Boy, in "Fabulous Joe"
- The Fabulous Joe (1947) - Elevator Boy (uncredited)
- For You I Die (1947) - Stick-Up Man (uncredited)
- Open Secret (1948) - Bob - Barfly
- Jungle Patrol (1948) - Lt. 'Ham' Hamilton
- I Shot Jesse James (1949) - Charles Ford
- I Cheated the Law (1949) - Sad Sam Carney
- The Set-Up (1949) - Masher on Street (uncredited)
- Trapped (1949) - Bank Teller (uncredited)
- Battleground (1949) - G.I. Straggler (uncredited)
- Adam's Rib (1949) - Reporter (uncredited)
- The Return of Jesse James (1950) - Charlie Ford
- Holiday Rhythm (1950) - Surgeon
- FBI Girl (1951) - Television Act
- The Model and the Marriage Broker (1951) - Young Clerk (uncredited)
- Starlift (1951) - Himself (as part of Noonan and Marshall) (uncredited)
- Gentlemen Prefer Blondes (1953) - Gus Esmond Jr.
- A Star Is Born (1954) - Danny McGuire
- Violent Saturday (1955) - Harry Reeves, Bank Manager
- How to Be Very, Very Popular (1955) - Eddie Jones
- The Ambassador's Daughter (1956) - Cpl. Al O'Connor
- The Best Things in Life Are Free (1956) - Carl Frisbee
- Bundle of Joy (1956) - Freddie Miller
- The Girl Most Likely (1958) - Buzz
- The Rookie (1959) - Pvt. Thomas Patrick "Tommy" Noonan / Japanese Submarine Sailor
- Swingin' Along (1961) - Freddy
- Promises! Promises! (1963) - Jeff Brooks
- 3 Nuts in Search of a Bolt (1964) - Tom
- Cottonpickin' Chickenpickers (1967) - Bird-Dog Berrigan (final film role)
