= The Rookie (1959 film) =

1959 film by George O'Hanlon

- Promotional poster
- Directed by: George O'Hanlon
- Written by: George O'Hanlon; Tommy Noonan
- Produced by: Tommy Noonan
- Starring: Tommy Noonan; Peter Marshall; Julie Newmar
- Cinematography: Floyd Crosby
- Edited by: Harry W. Gerstad
- Music by: Paul Dunlap
- Production company: Associated Productions, Inc.
- Distributed by: 20th Century-Fox
- Release date: December 1, 1959
- Running time: 84 minutes
- Country: United States
- Language: English
- Budget: $158,000

The Rookie is a 1959 American comedy film directed by writer-comedian George O'Hanlon and presented in CinemaScope. It was the first film starring the comedy team of Tommy Noonan and Peter Marshall; they also appeared together in the 1962 film Swingin' Along.

== Plot ==
The film is set in 1945. Thomas Patrick Noonan (Tommy Noonan) is a radio station page who receives an Army induction draft notice on the day World War II ends. He insists he should fulfill his military duty, and a mistake at the Pentagon results in a decommissioned stateside military facility being kept open to accommodate his basic training. The entire fort and its staff are serving a solitary soldier.

Sgt. Peter Marshall (Peter Marshall), who is in charge of shutting the camp down, is angry he has to remain in the Army, since he was planning to marry his girlfriend, movie starlet Lili Marlene (Julie Newmar). Tommy falls in love with Lili, and her press agent Jerry Mann devises a publicity stunt for Lili to return the emotion and plan to marry him. The sergeant, furious about losing Lili, attempts to sabotage Tommy's basic training, but his scheme backfires and the two men find themselves stationed in Japan. Lili follows them, and through complicated circumstances the trio wind up stranded on a desert island that is soon visited by two Japanese sailors who are unaware the war has ended.

== Cast ==
- Tommy Noonan as Pvt. Thomas Patrick Noonan
- Peter Marshall as MSgt. Pete Marshall
- Julie Newmar as Lili Marlene
- Jerry Lester as Jerry Mann
- Joe Besser as Medical Corpsman
- Claude Stroud as Col. Taylor
- Norman Leavitt as Maj. Evert
- Vince Barnett as 1st Janitor
- Rodney Bell as 2nd Janitor
- Herb Armstrong as Lt. Pat Sumner
- Richard Reeves as Sgt. Bruce, Military Police
- John Pickard as Military Policeman
- Don Corey as Cook
- George Eldredge as Gen. Bechtel
- Peter Leeds as Seville Quare
- Patrick O'Moore as Ship's Captain Weiss
- Glen Vernon as Chaplain
- Frank Mitchell as Ship's Purser

== Production ==
The Rookie was the first film in which Noonan and Marshall, who had appeared on television and in nightclubs during the late 1940s and 1950s, had starring roles. Their only previous film work had been a guest appearance in the all-star revue Starlift in 1951.

The Rookie was intended to be the first in a series of films starring Noonan and Marshall, who were being billed as the "new Abbott and Costello" by the studio. The two also played the Japanese sailors who encounter the American soldiers on the deserted island.

The Rookie was produced by Robert L. Lippert at 20th Century-Fox on a budget of only $158,000. Peter Marshall would later recall that the television program Adventures in Paradise was the only other production being filmed at Fox during that time, and he thought the lack of activity made the studio feel like a "ghost town."

Lippert was enthusiastic about The Rookie: "Do you realize this is the first time in movie history that we've been without a male comedy team?" He said Julie Newmar was in the film for "oomph".

Filming took place in August 1959 under the title The Last Rookie. Lippert said he spent $250,000 to sell the film.

== Reception ==
The film premiered in 75 theaters on Christmas Day, 1959. Trade reviewers saw promise but thought the film fell short. Publisher Pete Harrison wrote, "Comic Noonan and singer-straight man Marshall are talented fellows, but they'll have to come across with more than the formula situations offered in this, their first picture [sic]. With the exception of one sequence at the end, the antics are mostly slapstick without being funny." Film Bulletin agreed: "With the exception of one hilarious routine at the end where the two portray a pair of lost Japanese who refuse to believe the war is over, their material is strictly old hat." The Exhibitor labeled the picture "wacky but uneven," adding "There is much that is amusing in this feature, but there is also much that is dull and a few moments in questionable taste. Noonan and Marshall are a fine comedy team and with better material should prove quite popular on the screen. A comedy bit by Noonan as a tipsy chef is a classic."

Despite the guarded reviews, The Rookie found an audience as one of the few lightweight comedies among the season's many science-fiction, western, and dramatic films, and it scored strongly at the box office. 20th Century-Fox hired Noonan and Marshall for another feature, originally titled Double Trouble but renamed Swingin' Along prior to its 1962 release. It was not successful and Noonan and Marshall broke up to pursue solo careers.

== See also ==
- List of American films of 1959
