= Those Endearing Young Charms =

Those Endearing Young Charms may refer to:

- Believe Me, if All Those Endearing Young Charms, an Irish folk song
- Those Endearing Young Charms, a 1943 play by Jerome Chodorov
- Those Endearing Young Charms (film), a 1945 American film based on Chodorov's play
- Those Endearing Young Charms (TV series), a short-lived television series that aired in 1952
