= Seven Days' Leave =

Seven Days' Leave may refer to:

- Seven Days' Leave, a 1917 play by Walter Howard
- Seven Days Leave (1930 film), a film starring Gary Cooper based on the play
- Seven Days' Leave (1942 film), a musical comedy
