= Wagon Tracks West =

1943 film by Howard Bretherton

- Theatrical release poster
- Directed by: Howard Bretherton
- Screenplay by: William Lively
- Produced by: Louis Gray
- Starring: Wild Bill Elliott; George "Gabby" Hayes; Tom Tyler; Anne Jeffreys; Rick Vallin; Robert Frazer
- Cinematography: Reggie Lanning
- Edited by: Charles Craft
- Music by: Mort Glickman
- Production company: Republic Pictures
- Distributed by: Republic Pictures
- Release date: August 19, 1943
- Running time: 55 minutes
- Country: United States
- Language: English

Wagon Tracks West is a 1943 American Western film directed by Howard Bretherton, written by William Lively, and starring Wild Bill Elliott, George "Gabby" Hayes, Tom Tyler, Anne Jeffreys, Rick Vallin and Robert Frazer. It was released on August 19, 1943, by Republic Pictures.

== Cast ==
- Wild Bill Elliott as Wild Bill Elliott
- George "Gabby" Hayes as Gabby
- Tom Tyler as Clawtooth
- Anne Jeffreys as Moon Hush
- Rick Vallin as Dr. John Fleetwing
- Robert Frazer as Robert Warren
- Roy Barcroft as Henchman Laird
- Charles Miller as Brown Bear
- Tom London as Lem Martin
- Cliff Lyons as Henchman Matt
- Jack Rockwell as Sheriff Summers
