= Mojave Firebrand =

1944 film by Spencer Gordon Bennet

- Theatrical release poster
- Directed by: Spencer Gordon Bennet
- Screenplay by: Norman S. Hall
- Produced by: Edward J. White
- Starring: Wild Bill Elliott; George "Gabby" Hayes; Anne Jeffreys; LeRoy Mason; Jack Ingram; Harry McKim
- Cinematography: Ernest Miller
- Edited by: Harry Keller
- Music by: Mort Glickman
- Production company: Republic Pictures
- Distributed by: Republic Pictures
- Release date: March 19, 1944
- Running time: 55 minutes
- Country: United States
- Language: English

Mojave Firebrand is a 1944 American Western film directed by Spencer Gordon Bennet and written by Norman S. Hall. The film stars Wild Bill Elliott, George "Gabby" Hayes, Anne Jeffreys, LeRoy Mason, Jack Ingram and Harry McKim. The film was released on March 19, 1944, by Republic Pictures.

== Plot ==
Gabby Whittaker (George "Gabby" Hayes) is a God fearing man who strikes it rich when Elijah, his mule, uncovers a silver claim. Whittaker goes about setting up a school and bringing in a teacher, Abigail Holmes (Anne Jeffries), for the town of Epitaph. Tracy Dalton, aka Turkey Dameron (LeRoy Mason) have moved in to Epitaph and have taken with the help of shady Sheriff Barker (Forrest Taylor) and Mayor Frisbie (Hal Price.) When good-guy Wild Bill Elliott comes across the Dalton gang giving 'ole Gabby a hard time, he comes to the rescue. Elliott then decides to help clean up the town and remove the corrupt henchmen in Epitaph.

== Cast ==
- Wild Bill Elliott as Wild Bill Elliott
- George "Gabby" Hayes as Gabby Hayes
- Anne Jeffreys as Gail Holmes
- LeRoy Mason as Tracy Dalton, aka Turkey Dameron
- Jack Ingram as Henchman Matt Ganton
- Harry McKim as Johnny Taylor
- Karl Hackett as Miner Luke Reed
- Forrest Taylor as Sheriff Barker
- Hal Price as Mayor Prisbie
- Marshall Reed as Henchman Nate Bigelow
- Kenne Duncan as Henchman
- Bud Geary as Henchman Red Collins
- Jack Kirk as Miner Jeff Butler
