= You Gotta Stay Happy =

1948 film by H. C. Potter

- Theatrical release poster
- Directed by: H.C. Potter
- Written by: Karl Tunberg; Robert Carson (story)
- Produced by: Karl Tunberg
- Starring: Joan Fontaine; James Stewart; Eddie Albert; Roland Young; Willard Parker; Percy Kilbride
- Cinematography: Russell Metty
- Edited by: Paul Weatherwax
- Music by: Daniele Amfitheatrof
- Production company: Rampart Productions
- Distributed by: Universal International
- Release date: November 4, 1948 (US)
- Running time: 100 minutes
- Country: United States
- Language: English
- Budget: $1,673,000 or $1,775,000
- Box office: $1,950,000

You Gotta Stay Happy is a 1948 American romantic comedy film directed by H.C. Potter and starring Joan Fontaine, James Stewart and Eddie Albert. It was distributed by Universal-International and produced by Karl Tunberg. The film was written by Karl Tunberg and Robert Carson and was released on November 4, 1948. The story tells of a marital ruckus that causes pilot Marvin Payne to become enmeshed in the world of New York heiress Miss Diana Dillwood.

== Plot ==
On her wedding day, New York heiress Diana "Dee Dee" Dillwood complains to her uncle and guardian, Ralph Tutwiler, that she is having second thoughts about her marriage to Henry Benson. Having gone through six previous broken engagements with Dee Dee, Ralph and psychologist Dr. Blucher advise her to stop doubting herself and "plunge into it" with Henry. She agrees, but as soon as she and Henry arrive at the Hampshire Hotel to start their honeymoon, she panics. Dee Dee tells Henry that their marriage is a mistake, but he declares that he will not be humiliated and lunges for her. Wearing a dressing gown, Dee Dee runs from their room and hides in the neighboring wedding suite, which is being occupied by Marvin Payne, a World War II army air force veteran trying to make it on a shoe-string with a startup air-freight business. Staying at the hotel courtesy of night manager Dick Hebert, Marvin has the misfortune of being roomed next to Dee Dee and Henry Benson.

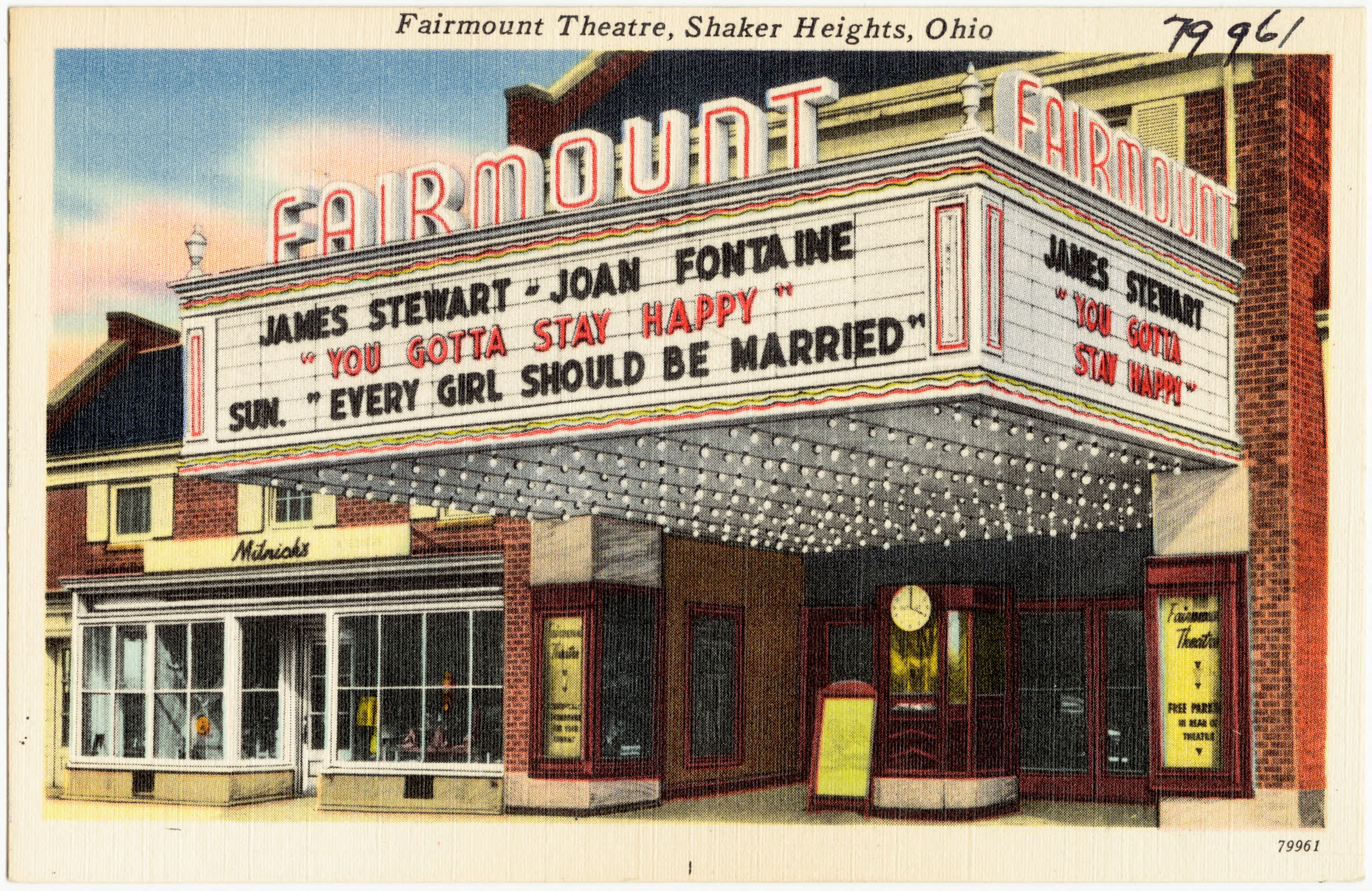
Theatre showing the film

When she enters Marvin's room, Dee Dee introduces herself as "Dottie Blucher," and Marvin assumes that she is a penniless country girl come to the city, who has descended to sleeping with married men to get by. All the while Payne does not realize that Miss Dillwood is independently wealthy and the married man she was to sleep with was the man she had just exchanged vows with that afternoon. Nonetheless, he agrees to allow Dee Dee to spend the night, and the over-excited Dee Dee asks the exhausted Marvin for a sleeping pill. Marvin phones Dick to have one delivered, and Dick's suspicions are aroused when he sees that Marvin is sleeping on the couch. As he searches the suite, Dee Dee hides and Dick leaves, satisfied that no "hanky-panky" is going on. Early the next morning, Marvin's business partner, fellow veteran, and co-pilot, Bullets Baker, shows up and finds Dee Dee knocked out by the pill. Marvin explains the situation, and as they have a scheduled flight to fly, he and Bullets try frantically to wake Dee Dee, but finally are caught by Dick. Marvin grudgingly agrees to give Dee Dee a lift out of town and encourages her to go back to home.

While Marvin and Dick rouse and dress Dee Dee in some of Marvin's pilot clothes, Bullets stalls a young couple who are due to be married in the suite. Then, Marvin and Bullets sneak the half-conscious Dee Dee out of the hotel and take her to the Newark, New Jersey airport, from which their twin-engine cargo plane is to fly. There, Dee Dee begs Marvin to fly her out of town, insinuating that she is in a serious predicament. Marvin agrees to take Dee Dee as far as Chicago, then learns that the free-wheeling Bullets sold the newlyweds from the hotel, Georgia and Milton Goodrich, two "tickets" to California for $100. Just before take-off, Dee Dee confesses to Marvin that she sold a man named Mr. Caslon a ticket to California for $300. During the flight, which they share with a cigar-smoking chimpanzee named Joe, Marvin reveals to Dee Dee that he is not going to marry until he has enough money to comfortably support a family, an eventuality he calculates will not occur until 1954.

When they land in Chicago, Dee Dee, who is falling for Marvin, reluctantly says goodbye to him, but he gives in and invites her to California. Soon after, a detective asks Marvin and Bullets if they are carrying a blonde who, along with her middle-aged partner, is wanted for embezzlement. The pilots answer no but come to the conclusion that the blonde is Dee Dee, especially after she returns from a shopping trip nicely dressed and bearing gifts (including a diamond ring for Georgia). Once back in the air, Marvin questions Dee Dee about her situation, but she is evasive. To Bullets' annoyance, Marvin decides not to land in Kansas City as planned but to go on to Tulsa to avoid authorities looking for Dee Dee. Near Tulsa, however, a storm hits and Marvin makes an emergency landing in a farm field.

After farmer Matt Racknell and his family invite the crew and passengers to spend the night in their home, Dee Dee and Marvin finally admit their mutual attraction and kiss. A guilt-ridden Caslon then confesses to Marvin that he is really Chalmers, the embezzler the policeman in Chicago was looking for and that his blonde secretary cajoled him into committing the crime. Now completely confused about Dee Dee, Marvin calls Dick in New York to inquire about her. The next morning, while trying to move the plane out of the muddy field, Marvin snubs Dee Dee without explanation. When Dee Dee finally realizes that he knows about her engagements and marriage, she tries to convince him that she truly loves him; however, he rejects her. With the help of some Cherokee Indians, the plane is pulled to dry land and takes off for California, without Dee Dee.

As soon as he lands in Burbank, Marvin learns that, because of the unexpected delays and other problems, his airline faces bankruptcy. However, during an impromptu stockholders meeting, Marvin discovers that Dee Dee has bought the company. Furious, Marvin finds Dee Dee at her aunt Martha's Bel Air home and informs her that he is not working for a woman. Dee Dee, who has just arranged for an annulment from Henry and has taken another sleeping pill, tries to argue with Marvin but falls asleep. The next day at the airport, she tells Marvin that he is going to run the company while she stays at and tends to the home. Dee Dee then presents Marvin with his own four-engine plane.

== Cast ==
- Joan Fontaine as Diana "Dee Dee" Dillwood (alias Dottie Blucher)
- James Stewart as Marvin Payne
- Eddie Albert as Bullets Baker
- Roland Young as Uncle Ralph Tutwiler
- Willard Parker as Henry Benson
- Percy Kilbride as Mr. Matt Racknell
- Porter Hall as Mr. Chalmers (alias Mr. Caslon)
- Marcy McGuire as Georgia Goodrich
- Arthur Walsh as Milton Goodrich
- William Bakewell as Dick Hebert
- Paul Cavanagh as Dr. Blucher
- Halliwell Hobbes as Martin
- Fritz Feld as Pierre
- Stanley Prager as Jack Samuels
- Frank Jenks as Carnival Man
- Mary Forbes as Aunt Martha Tutwiler
- Edith Evanson as Mrs. Racknell
- Peter Roman as Barnabas
- Houseley Stevenson as Jud Tavis
- Emory Parnell as Bank Watchman
- Arthur Hohl as Cemetery Man
- Don Kohler as Ted
- Bert Conway as Neil
- Hal K. Dawson as Night Clerk
- Vera Marshe as Mae
- Jimmie Dodd as Curly
- Robert Rockwell as Eddie
- Joe the Chimp as himself

== Production ==
The film was produced by Rampart Productions, which was a film productions owned by Joan Fontaine and her second husband, William Dozier. The pair had previously produced Letter from an Unknown Woman earlier that year.

The opening animated sequence during the credits at the beginning of the film was done by Walter Lantz and his production company, being well known for famous Universal cartoons like Woody Woodpecker, Chilly Willy, and Andy Panda.

== Home media ==
Universal first released the film on DVD on June 12, 2007, as part of the James Stewart Screen Legend Collection, a 3-disc set featuring four other films (Next Time We Love, Thunder Bay, The Glenn Miller Story, and Shenandoah). The film was re-released on August 24, 2011, as a stand-alone DVD as part of the Universal Vault Series. On May 17, 2016, Universal re-released the film again as part of the Universal Hollywood Icons Collection: James Stewart, a 2-disc set featuring three other films (Harvey, Winchester '73, and The Glenn Miller Story).
