= The Crimson Key =

1947 film by Eugene Forde

- Theatrical release poster
- Directed by: Eugene Forde
- Screenplay by: Irving Elman
- Produced by: Sol M. Wurtzel
- Starring: Kent Taylor; Doris Dowling; Dennis Hoey; Louise Currie; Ivan Triesault; Arthur Space
- Cinematography: Benjamin H. Kline
- Edited by: Frank Baldridge; William F. Claxton
- Music by: R. Dale Butts
- Production company: 20th Century Fox
- Distributed by: 20th Century Fox
- Release date: July 2, 1947
- Running time: 76 minutes
- Country: United States
- Language: English

The Crimson Key is a 1947 American mystery film directed by Eugene Forde and written by Irving Elman, starring Kent Taylor, Doris Dowling and Dennis Hoey. It was released on July 2 by 20th Century Fox.

== Plot ==
Private detective Larry Morgan is hired by a Mrs. Swann to investigate her husband, who is soon found dead in the studio of Peter Vandaman, an artist. Mrs. Swann is concerned about a missing key belonging to her husband.

Morgan encounters a receptionist, Miss Phillips, who was in love with Swann, and a man, Steven Loring, who suspected his wife and Swann of having an affair. Loring's alcoholic wife, Margaret, mentions a Key Club with a special red key to a locker, but before he can check it out, Mrs. Swann is murdered and Morgan is beaten by thugs and nearly drugged by a woman named Heidi. He eventually discovers Loring's wife to be the murderer.

== Cast ==
- Kent Taylor as Lawrence 'Larry' Morgan
- Doris Dowling as Margaret Loring
- Dennis Hoey as Steven Loring
- Louise Currie as Heidi
- Ivan Triesault as Peter Vandaman
- Arthur Space as Det. Capt. Fitzroy
- Vera Marshe as Daisy 'Dizzy' Nelson
- Edwin Rand as Jeffrey Regan III
- Bernadene Hayes as Mrs. Swann
- Victoria Horne as Miss Phillips
- Douglas Evans as Dr. Kenneth G. Swann
- Ann Doran as Paris Wood
- Victor Sen Yung as Wing
- Ralf Harolde as Gunman
