= Doris Dowling =

American actress (1923–2004)

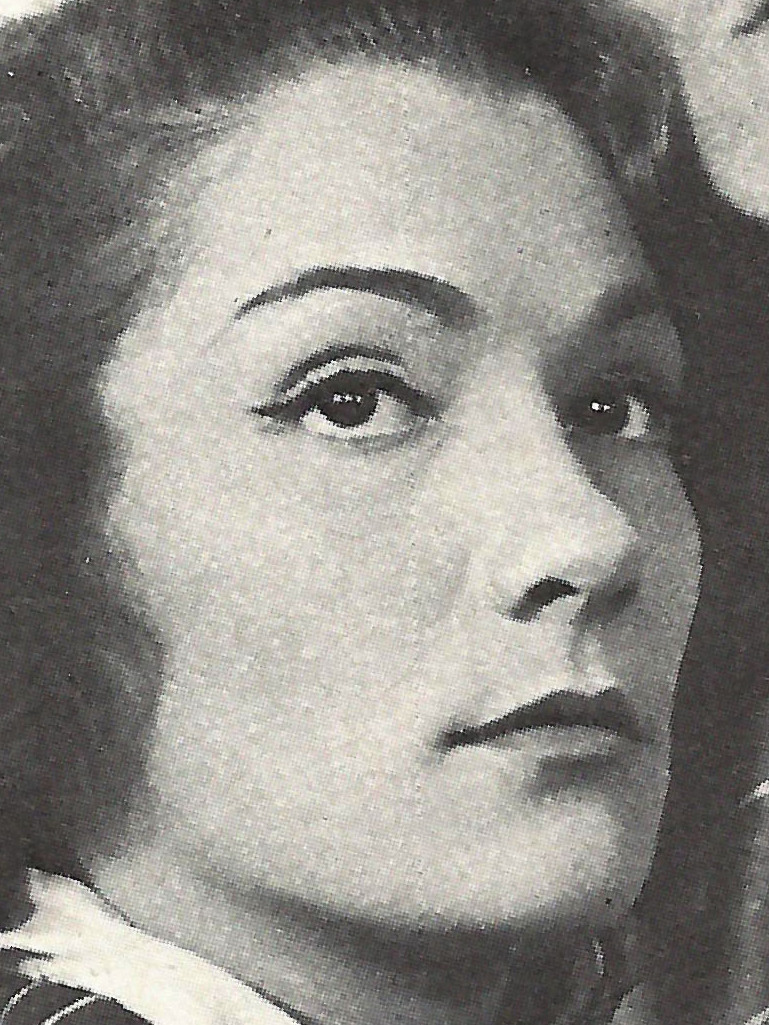
- Dowling in 1948
- Born: May 15, 1923; Detroit, Michigan, U.S.
- Died: June 18, 2004 (aged 81); Los Angeles, California, U.S.
- Resting place: Holy Cross Cemetery, Culver City
- Occupation: Actress
- Years active: 1944–1984
- Spouses: Artie Shaw (m. 1952; div. 1956) Robert F. Blumofe (m. 1956; div. 1959) Leonard Kaufman (m. 1960)
- Children: Jonathan Shaw

Doris Dowling (May 15, 1923 – June 18, 2004) was an American actress. She is best known for the films The Crimson Key (1946) and Bitter Rice (1949). She is also known for playing Irene Adams on My Living Doll (1964–1965) and other TV show appearances such as The Andy Griffith Show, Perry Mason, and The Incredible Hulk.

== Early years ==
Dowling was born in Detroit, Michigan, but grew up in New York City with siblings Robert, Richard, and Constance (who also became an actress). After graduating from Hunter College High School, she spent a short time with a Folies Bergère group in San Francisco before her mother brought her back to New York to attend Hunter College.

== Film ==
After her time as a chorus girl on Broadway, Dowling followed her elder sister Constance to Hollywood. Her first credited film role was that of Gloria, an apparent escort who takes a shine to Ray Milland in the 1945 film The Lost Weekend.

She next appeared in The Blue Dahlia, which starred Alan Ladd and Veronica Lake. Dowling portrayed Ladd's wife.

As work grew scarce after the war, she emigrated to Italy to revive her career as her sister had done.

In Italy, Dowling starred in several acclaimed films, including Bitter Rice. She appeared in Orson Welles's European production of Othello in 1951, playing Bianca.

Back in the United States, she returned to film in Running Target (1956) and appeared in the 1977 production The Car.

== Television ==
Upon returning to the United States, much of Dowling's work was in theater and on television. She appeared in such television shows as One Step Beyond, Have Gun – Will Travel, Mickey Spillane's Mike Hammer, Cheyenne, Alfred Hitchcock Presents, Science Fiction Theater, Adam 12, Bonanza, Perry Mason, Daktari,The Andy Griffith Show and, late in her career, Kojak, Barnaby Jones, The Incredible Hulk, and The Dukes of Hazzard. She co-starred with Bob Cummings and Julie Newmar in the sitcom My Living Doll.

== Stage ==
Dowling shared the Outer Critics Circle Award for Best Ensemble Performance in 1972–1973 for her performance in a revival of The Women on Broadway. Her other Broadway credits include Panama Hattie (1942), Banjo Eyes (1942), Beat the Band (1942), and New Faces of 1943 (1943).

== Personal life ==
Dowling dated Billy Wilder during the 1940s and married three times. In 1952, she became bandleader Artie Shaw's seventh wife. They had a son, Jonathan, before divorcing in 1956. Later that year, on April 27, 1956, Dowling married film executive Robert F. Blumofe; they divorced in 1959. She married Leonard Kaufman on April 20, 1960, to whom she remained married until her death in 2004.

== Death ==
Dowling died at Cedars-Sinai Medical Center in Los Angeles, California, on June 18, 2004, at age 81. She is buried at Holy Cross Cemetery, Culver City, California.

== Filmography ==
Year	Title	Role	Notes
1944	And Now Tomorrow	Maid of Honor	Uncredited
1945	Bring On the Girls	Girl	Uncredited
1945	The Lost Weekend	Gloria	
1946	The Blue Dahlia	Helen Morrison	
1947	The Crimson Key	Margaret Loring	
1948	The Emperor Waltz	Tyrolean Girl	Uncredited
1949	Bitter Rice	Francesca	
1950	Sarumba	Hildita	
1950	Alina	Marie	
1950	Hearts at Sea	Doris	
1951	Othello	Bianca	
1956	Running Target	Smitty	
1958	Wink of an Eye	Myrna Duchane	
1958	The Party Crashers	Mrs. Hazel Webster	
1960	Alfred Hitchcock Presents	Angie	Season 6 Episode 9: "The Money"
1966	Birds Do It	Congresswoman Clanger	
1977	The Car	Bertha	
1981	Separate Ways	Rebecca Stevens	
