= Anne Jeffreys =

American actress and singer (1923–2017)

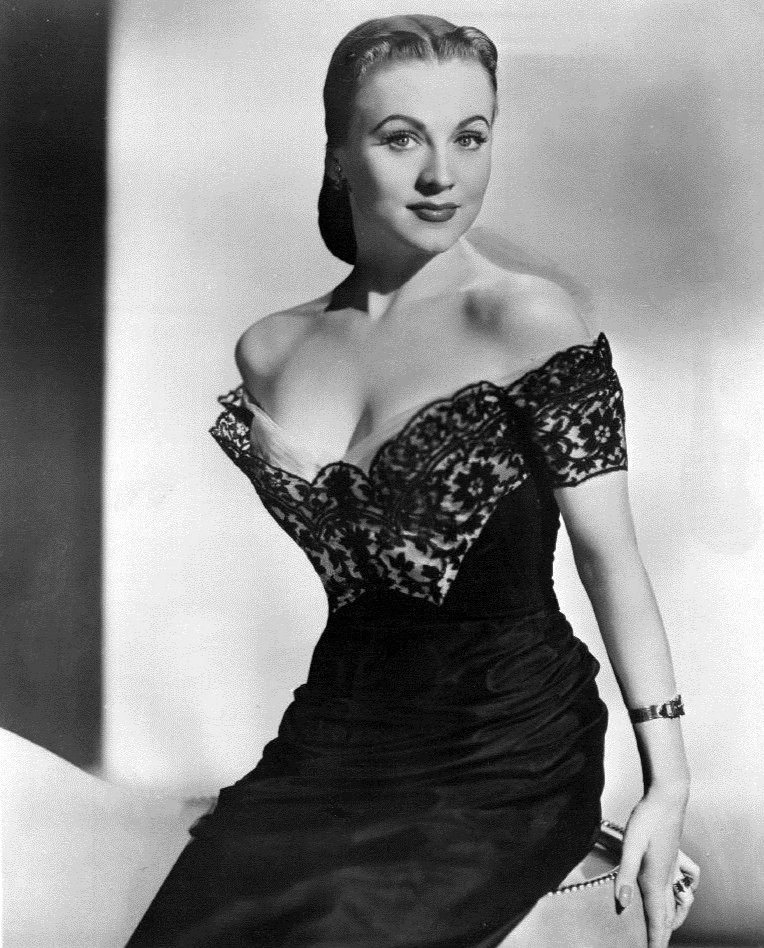
- Jeffreys in 1956
- Born: Annie Jeffreys Carmichael; January 26, 1923; Goldsboro, North Carolina, U.S.
- Died: September 27, 2017 (aged 94); Los Angeles, California, U.S.
- Other names: Anne Jeffries, Ann Jeffries
- Occupations: Actress, singer
- Years active: 1941–2015
- Spouses: Joseph R. Serena (m. 1945; annul. 1949) Robert Sterling (m. 1951; died 2006)
- Children: 3
- Website: annejeffreys.com

Anne Jeffreys (born Annie Jeffreys Carmichael; January 26, 1923 – September 27, 2017) was an American actress and singer. She was the female lead in the 1950s television series Topper.

== Early life and career ==
Jeffreys was born Annie Jeffreys Carmichael on January 26, 1923, in Goldsboro, North Carolina. Jeffreys entered the entertainment field at a young age, having her initial training in voice (she was an accomplished soprano). She became a member of the New York Municipal Opera Company on a scholarship and sang the lead at Carnegie Hall in such presentations as La bohème, Traviata, and Pagliacci. However, she decided as a teenager to sign with the John Robert Powers agency as a junior model.

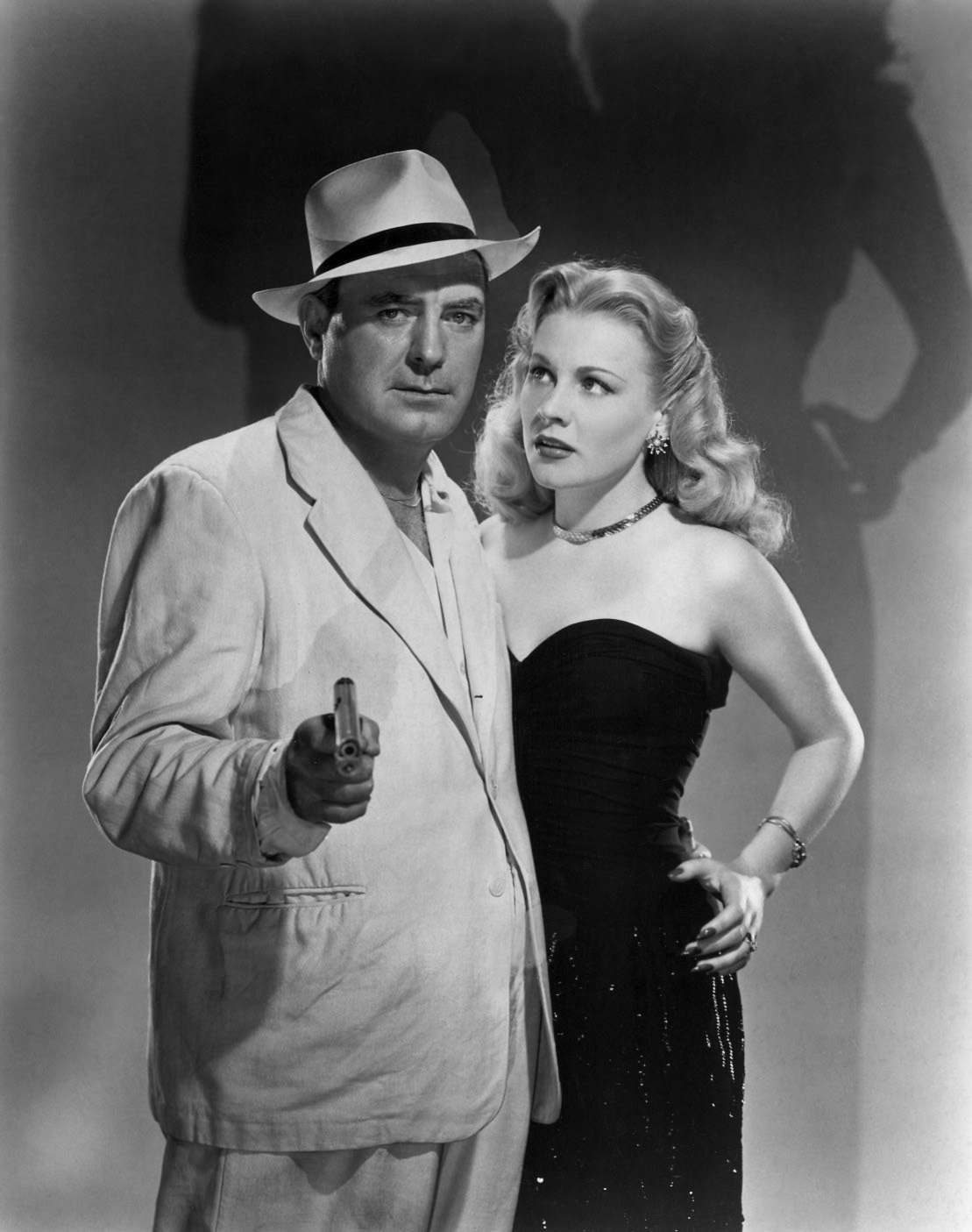
Pat O'Brien and Jeffreys in Riffraff (1947)

Her plans for an operatic career were sidelined when she was cast in a staged musical revue, Fun for the Money. Her appearance in that revue led to her being cast in her first movie role, in I Married an Angel (1942), starring Nelson Eddy and Jeanette MacDonald. She was under contract to both RKO and Republic Studios during the 1940s, including several appearances as Tess Trueheart in the Dick Tracy series, and the 1944 Frank Sinatra musical Step Lively. She also appeared in the horror comedy Zombies on Broadway with Wally Brown and Alan Carney in 1945 and starred in Riffraff with Pat O'Brien two years later. Jeffreys also appeared in a number of western films and as bank robber John Dillinger's moll in 1945's Dillinger.

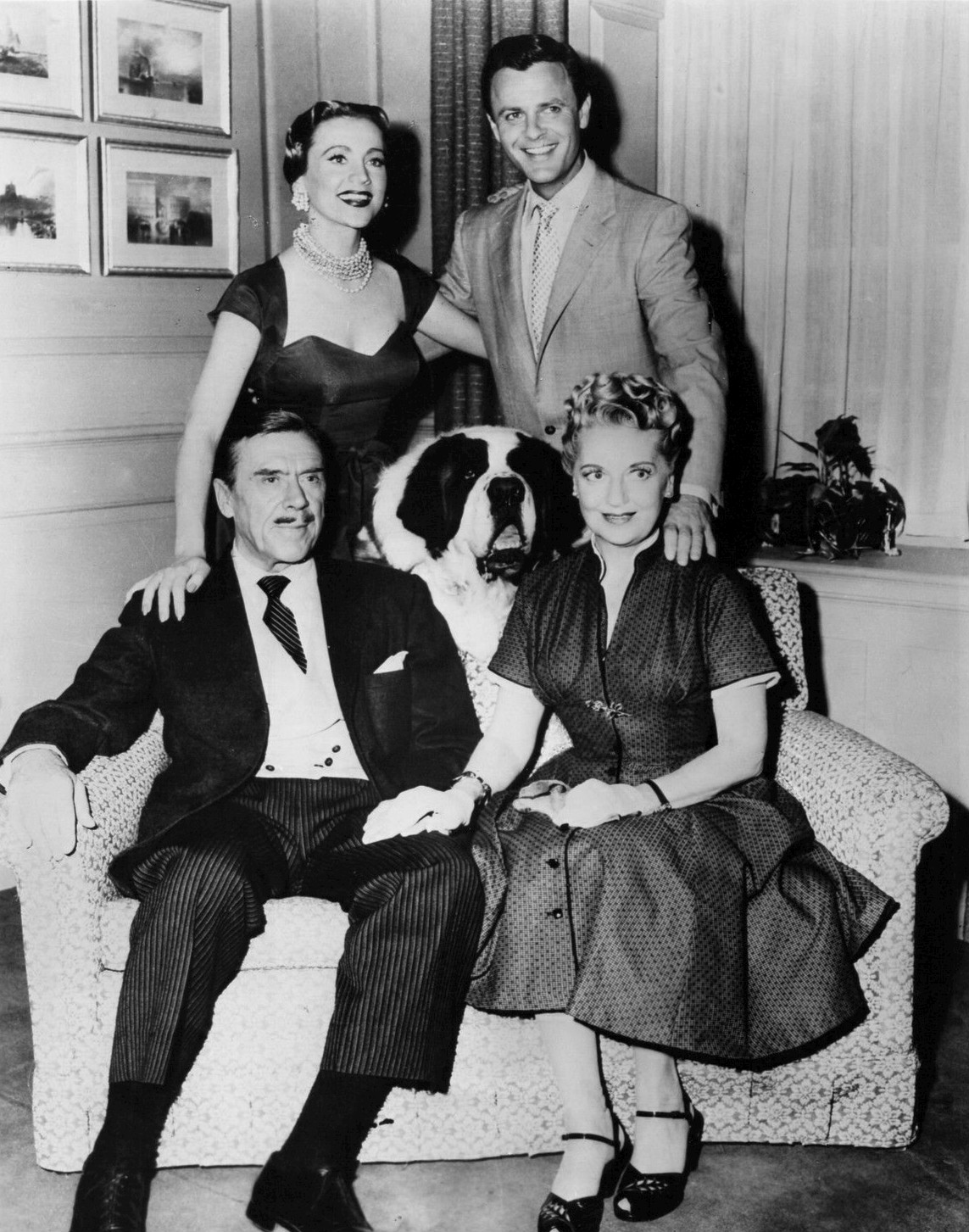
Cast of Topper (1953) Jeffreys, Robert Sterling, Leo G. Carroll and Lee Patrick

When her Hollywood career faltered, she instead focused on the stage, playing lead roles on Broadway in productions such as the 1947 opera Street Scene, the 1948 Cole Porter musical Kiss Me, Kate (having replaced Patricia Morison), the 1948 musical, My Romance, and the 1952 musical Three Wishes for Jamie. With long-term husband Robert Sterling, she appeared in the CBS sitcom Topper (1953–1955), in which she was billed in a voiceover as "the ghostess with the mostest".

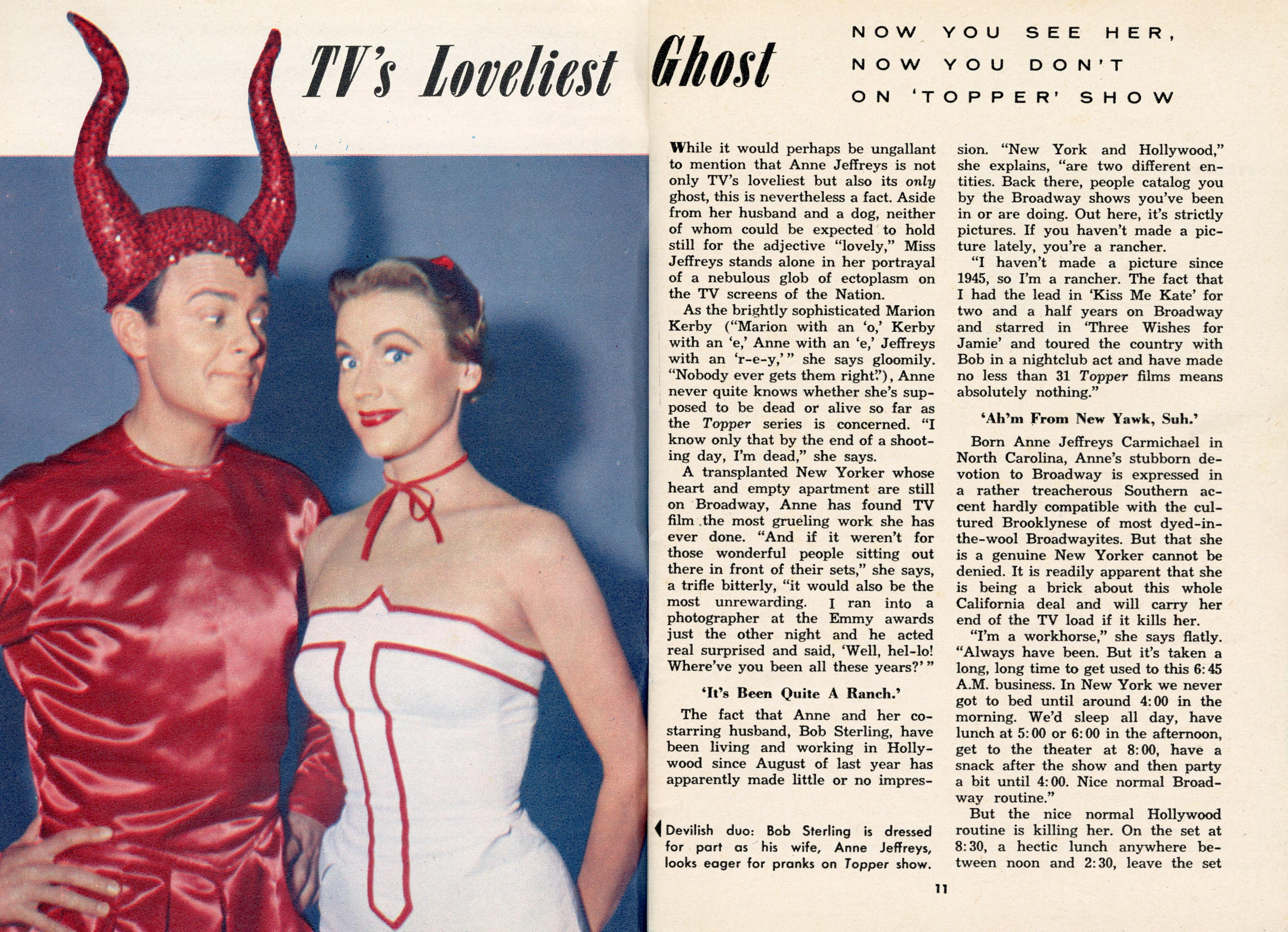
Jeffreys and Robert Sterling in TV Guide, June 4, 1954

In 1955, she appeared in two TV musicals. On April 9, she starred in the title role of the Widow in the Max Liebman production of the "Merry Widow". Later that year on November 26, she appeared with her husband in "Dearest Enemy", set during the American Revolution, also produced by Liebman.

On December 18, 1957, Jeffreys and her husband played a couple with an unusual courtship arrangement brought about by an attack of the fever in the episode "The Julie Gage Story", broadcast in the first season of NBC's Wagon Train.

After a semi-retirement in the 1960s, she appeared on television, appearing in episodes of such series as Love, American Style (with her husband), L.A. Law and Murder, She Wrote. She was nominated for a Golden Globe for her work in The Delphi Bureau (1972). From 1984 to 1985, she starred in the short-lived Aaron Spelling series Finder of Lost Loves. She also appeared in Baywatch as David Hasselhoff's mother, and also had a recurring role in the night-time soap Falcon Crest as Amanda Croft.

In 1979, she guest starred as Siress Blassie in the Battlestar Galactica episode "The Man with Nine Lives" as a love interest of Chameleon, a part played by Fred Astaire. She was the last person to dance with him onscreen. She also guest starred as Prime Minister Dyne in the Buck Rogers in the 25th Century episode "Planet of the Amazon Women" as the leader of the titular planet.

Her later career was in daytime television. From 1984 to 2004, she appeared on the soap opera General Hospital (as well as its short-lived spinoff, Port Charles) in the recurring role of wealthy socialite Amanda Barrington, a long-time board member of both the hospital and ELQ. In her initial storyline, she was part of a blackmail scheme which led to the murder of Jimmy Lee Holt's mother, Beatrice, of whose death she was a suspect in. In the last year of Port Charles, Amanda last appeared on screen in 2004 when Amanda attended Lila Quartermain's funeral. In 2012, she appeared in an episode of California's Gold being interviewed, along with Ann Rutherford, by Huell Howser.

== Personal life and death ==
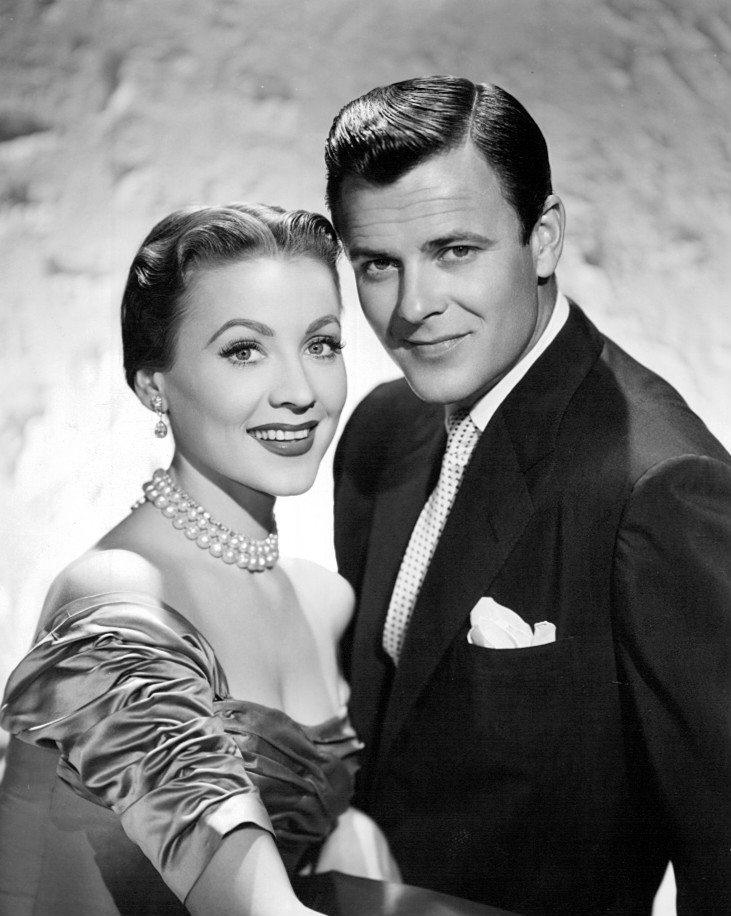
Jeffreys and Robert Sterling, 1956

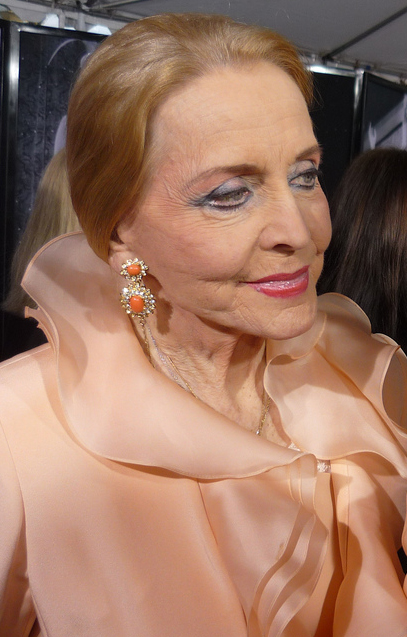
Jeffreys in 2010

Jeffreys was married twice. Her first marriage, to Joseph Serena in 1945, was annulled in 1949. They had no children.

She married actor Robert Sterling in 1951. Sterling appeared with Jeffreys in one episode of the series Wagon Train ("The Julie Gage Story", in which their characters also married each other), and in Topper. In January 1958, the duo starred in another series, Love That Jill. It ran only three months, with 13 episodes shot. They had three sons: Jeffrey, Dana and Tyler. Robert Sterling died on May 30, 2006, at age 88.

In July 1956, Jeffreys' mother, Kate Jeffreys Carmichael, 67, was run down and killed by her own automobile in the driveway of her daughter's home. Police said Carmichael was taking books from the car's trunk when the emergency brake apparently slipped. The car rolled down the sloping driveway, dragging the actress's mother 26 feet (8 m).

Jeffreys died at her home in Los Angeles, on September 27, 2017, at the age of 94.

She was a devout Roman Catholic and a staunch conservative Republican who campaigned for and supported Thomas Dewey, Dwight Eisenhower, Richard Nixon, Barry Goldwater, Gerald Ford, Ronald Reagan, and George H.W. Bush.

== Recognition ==
Jeffreys' star in the Television category on the Hollywood Walk of Fame is at 1501 Vine Street. It was dedicated February 8, 1960. In 1997, she was a recipient of a Golden Boot Award as one who "furthered the tradition of the western on film and in television." In 1998, she received the Living Legacy Award from the Women's International Center.

== Filmography ==
=== Film ===
Year	Title	Role	Notes
1942	Billy the Kid Trapped	Sally Crane	
1942	Yokel Boy	Witness at wedding	Uncredited
1942	Tarzan's New York Adventure	Young woman	Uncredited
1942	Moonlight Masquerade	Singer at Trio	Uncredited
1942	I Married an Angel	Polly	
1942	Joan of Ozark	Marie Lamont	
1942	The Old Homestead	Goldie	
1942	Flying Tigers	Nurse	Uncredited
1942	X Marks the Spot	Lulu	
1943	Chatterbox	Vivan Gale	
1943	Calling Wild Bill Elliott	Edith Richards	
1943	The Man from Thunder River	Nancy Ferguson	
1943	Crime Doctor	Reporter on telephone	Uncredited
1943	Bordertown Gun Fighters	Anita Shelby	
1943	Wagon Tracks West	Moon Hush	
1943	Overland Mail Robbery	Judy Goodrich	
1943	Death Valley Manhunt	Nicky Hobart	
1944	Mojave Firebrand	Gail Holmes	
1944	Hidden Valley Outlaws	June Clark	
1944	Step Lively	Miss Abbott	
1944	Nevada	Julie Dexter	
1945	Dillinger	Helen Rogers	
1945	Zombies on Broadway	Jean La Danse	
1945	Those Endearing Young Charms	Suzibelle, officer's club waitress	
1945	Sing Your Way Home	Kay Lawrence	
1945	Dick Tracy	Tess Trueheart	
1946	Ding Dong Williams	Vanessa Page	
1946	Step by Step	Evelyn Smith	
1946	Genius at Work	Ellen Brent	
1946	Dick Tracy vs. Cueball	Tess Trueheart	
1946	Vacation in Reno	Eleanor	
1947	Trail Street	Ruby Stone	
1947	Riffraff	Maxine Manning	
1948	Return of the Bad Men	Cheyenne	
1962	Boys' Night Out	Toni Jackson	
1968	Panic in the City	Myra Pryor	
1976	Southern Double Cross		
1994	Clifford	Annabelle Davis	
2008	Richard III	Duchess of York	
2008	Empire State Building Murders	Betty Clark	TV movie
2012	Sins Expiation	Susanna	
2015	Le Grand Jete	Millie Halifax	

=== Television ===
Year	Title	Role	Notes
1953–1955	Topper	Marion Kerby	78 episodes
1955	Merry Widow	Sonya Sadoya	TV musical
1955	Dearest Enemy	Betsy Burke	TV musical
1957	Wagon Train	Julie Gage	Episode: The Julie Gage Story
1957	Wagon Train	Mary Beckett	Episode: The Mary Beckett Story
1958	Love That Jill	Jill Johnson	13 episodes
1966	Bonanza	Lily	Episode: "The Unwritten Commandment"
1966	The Man from U.N.C.L.E.	Calamity Rogers	Episode: "The Abominable Snowman Affair"
1969	My Three Sons	Mrs. Carstairs	Episode: What did you do today Grandpa
1972	Love, American Style	the First Lady	Segment "Love and the President"; Episode: "Love and the Clinic/Love and the Perfect Wedding/Love and the President/Love and the Return of Raymond"
1972–1973	The Delphi Bureau	Sybil Van Loween	
1975–1976	Police Story	Examiner Murphy / Marie Tabor	2 episodes
1978–1982	Fantasy Island	Nancy Ogden / Cissy Darumple / Sally Dupres	3 episodes
1978	Flying High	Mrs. Benton	Episode: "In the Still of the Night"
1979	Battlestar Galactica	Siress Blassie	Episode: "The Man with Nine Lives"
1979	Vega$	Cynthia	Episode: "Doubtful Target"
1979	Beggarman, Thief	Honor Day	TV movie
1982–1983	Falcon Crest	Amanda Croft	7 episodes
1983	Matt Houston	Elisabeth Davis	Episode: "Here's Another Fine Mess"
1984	Hotel	Mrs. Jenks	Episode: "Tomorrows"
1984–1985	Finder of Lost Loves	Rita Hargrove	23 episodes
1984–2004	General Hospital	Amanda Barrington	361 episodes
1986	Murder, She Wrote	Agnes Shipley	Episode: "If a Body Meet a Body"
1992	L.A. Law	Lilah Vandenberg	Episode: "I'm Ready for My Closeup, Mr. Markowitz"
1993–1998	Baywatch	Irene Buchannon	5 episodes
1999–2003	Port Charles	Amanda Barrington	17 episodes
2013	Getting On	Donna Hewler	Episode: "If You're Going to San Francisco"

== Selected musical theatre work ==
- La bohème (1940 New York City)
- Fun for the Money (1941 Hollywood)
- Tosca (1946 Brooklyn Opera House)
- The Merry Widow (1947 GreekTheatre, Los Angeles)
- Street Scene (1947 Broadway debut)
- My Romance (1947-1948 Broadway)
- Kiss Me, Kate (1949-1950 National Tour)
- Kiss Me, Kate (1950-1951 Broadway)
- Bitter Sweet (1951 San Francisco, Los Angeles)
- Three Wishes for Jamie (1952 Broadway)
- Bells Are Ringing (1958)
- Destry Rides Again (1960 National Tour)
- Kismet (1962 National Tour)
- Camelot (1964 National Tour)
- Anniversary Waltz (1964 Anaheim)
- Kismet (1965 National Tour)
- Do I Hear a Waltz? (1966)
- Ninotchka (1966)
- Pal Joey (1968 Kenley Players, Ohio)
- The Desert Song (1968 Milwaukee)
- Light Up the Sky (1969 Chicago)
- Song of Norway (1969)
- The Most Happy Fella (1970)
- The King and I (1974)
- Follies (1977)
- High Button Shoes (1978)
- The Sound of Music (1978 Tucson, Arizona, Southern Arizona Light Opera Company)
- And the Melody Lingers On (1979, Cape Playhouse, Dennis, Massachusetts)
- A High-Time Salute to Martin and Blane (1991 benefit concert)
