= The Reel to Reel Picture Show =

- Genre: Game show
- Directed by: Jeff Goldstein
- Presented by: Peter Marshall
- Announcer: Bill Armstrong
- Country of origin: United States
- Original language: English
- No. of episodes: 25

Production
- Executive producers: Sandy Cherry; Kathy Cargill; Bill Lewochko
- Producer: Bill Armstrong
- Production location: Universal Studios Florida
- Running time: approx. 26 Minutes
- Production company: TIL’ Productions

Original release
- Network: PAX TV
- Release: August 31 – October 2, 1998

The Reel-to-Reel Picture Show (also known as Reel-to-Reel) is an American game show that aired on PAX TV from August 31 to October 2, 1998. The show was taped at Universal Studios Florida, with Peter Marshall hosting. Bill Armstrong was the announcer. It was the network's first game show, debuting the day the network launched. Teams consisting of contestants and celebrities competed to answer trivia questions about film.

The show was based on a Canadian board game, and the show was developed as a marketing tool to help sell it.

== Main game ==
Two teams, consisting of one contestant and one celebrity, competed. The contestant on the first team pushed a button, which randomly selected one of six categories and a point value (either 100, 250, or 500 depending on difficulty). Marshall would ask them a question in that category, getting it right won the points, with no penalty for an incorrect answer. The second team repeated the process.

Some of the questions were special "Take Two" questions. If the team got the first question right, they were then asked a second question related to the first for double the point value. If they were wrong, they lost the value of the first question.

The round ended with each team getting three questions worth 300 points apiece, with the third question being a true/false question about the opposing team's celebrity. After this, the team in the lead got a small prize.

Round 2 was called the "Director's Chair". Six categories were given, and the trailing team selected one. They were then asked six questions in that category (increasing in worth from 100 to 200, 400, 800, 1,000, and 2,000 points). The process was repeated with the second team. After this, the team in the lead won the game, received a bonus prize, and advanced to the bonus round.

=== Bonus round ===
The winning team was asked six questions. Each answer was a clue to a famous person, movie character, or title. After the six questions were asked, they had ten seconds to solve the puzzle. A correct solve won a trip.

== Cancellation ==
PAX ordered 200 episodes (40 weeks) of Reel-to-Reel, which would have taken the series through June 4, 1999. Despite the order, the production company – TIL – was having financial problems while tapings proceeded and ceased production after five weeks (25 episodes) had been filmed. Many contestants never received their winnings.
