= Fantasy (game show) =

- Genre: Game show
- Created by: Merrill Heatter and Earl Greenburg
- Directed by: Ron de Moraes
- Presented by: Peter Marshall; Leslie Uggams; Glenn Scarpelli
- Announcer: Bill Armstrong; Johnny Gilbert; Charlie Tuna
- Country of origin: United States
- No. of seasons: 1
- No. of episodes: approx. 325

Production
- Producer: Merrill Heatter
- Running time: approx. 48 minutes
- Production companies: Merrill Heatter Productions; Earl Greenberg Productions; Columbia Pictures Television

Original release
- Network: NBC
- Release: September 13, 1982 – October 28, 1983

Fantasy is an American game show co-hosted by Peter Marshall, Leslie Uggams, and Glenn Scarpelli, with Chris Lemmon and Meredith MacRae as remote correspondents. Bill Armstrong announced the show. It aired on NBC from September 13, 1982, to October 28, 1983, and was videotaped at the network's studios in Burbank, California. On the week of August 1-5, 1983, filling in for that program was Personal & Confidential.

== Format ==
The hour-long show offered contestants the opportunity to "make their dreams come true". Each episode typically consisted of four or five segments and was taped before a studio audience. Hosts Marshall and Uggams called audience members whose fantasies were being granted onstage. In most cases, the guests of honor were surprised since the show worked with family members, friends, and colleagues of the guests for several weeks in advance of the show tapings to set up the elaborate fantasies.

For example, one guest's fantasy was to finally be able to repair and restore his treasured 1971 Opel GT automobile. He never had the time or money to work on the car because he was too busy taking care of his wife and children and usually gave away any extra money he wanted to save to help someone in need. To keep the fantasy a surprise, the show worked with the man's wife, the local police department, and the man's auto insurance company. The producers of the show arranged to "borrow" the man's car without his knowledge and the wife was to tell her husband that the car had been stolen. Then the man reported the car stolen to the local police department and their insurance company, all of whom were in on the surprise. The show's producers then had the Opel fully restored exactly the way the man wanted to do it. Meanwhile, the wife lured her husband to the studio for the show's taping where he was genuinely surprised to find his car fully restored and presented to him free of charge.

The show received anywhere from 40,000 to 80,000 letters per week from viewers across the United States wanting their fantasies fulfilled. The show's producers carefully reviewed each request to find ones that would be entertaining enough to use on the show. Many of the letters received were simply requests for money, according to the show's mailroom supervisor, Kathy Hassett, in a 1983 TV Guide interview. Those letters usually ended up in the trash can. Hassett told TV Guide that "We're looking for human interest and funny fantasies such as people who want to find their long-lost relatives, jump from an airplane, or meet their favorite TV star."

To add some variety to the show, audience members were sometimes selected at random to come onstage to receive prizes by playing a game. One popular feature of the show was the "Fantasy Fountain", a glass money booth similar to one used on the short-lived 1975 game show The Diamond Head Game. An audience member was placed in the booth while a wind machine blew around dollar bills of various denominations. The player was given a time limit to grab as many bills as possible and stuff them in a bag provided.

In another regular segment called "Fantasy Forum", host Marshall called three audience members onstage where they could voice their opinions on national TV on a topic of their choice for one minute. Audience members then voted for the person they thought did the best job, with the winner receiving a prize. Celebrity guests joined hosts Marshall and Uggams each day to help with the elaborate fantasies. Among the celebrities who appeared on Fantasy included Tom Wopat, Andy Gibb, Jed Allan, and Sylvester Stallone.

== Reception ==
Fantasy won a Daytime Emmy Award for Uggams in 1983 for Outstanding Host in a Variety Series.
