= Jonathan Shaw (tattoo artist) =

American tattoo artist and writer (born 1953)

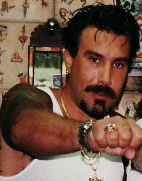
Jonathan Shaw in Fun City Tattoo, showing the ring of the Death Is Certain Club.

Jonathan Dowling Shaw (born July 4, 1953) is an American tattoo artist and writer. He founded New York City's oldest tattoo shop, Fun City Tattoo, in 1976, before tattooing was legal in the city.

== Early life ==
Shaw was born in 1953 to big band musician and bandleader Artie Shaw and his seventh wife, actress Doris Dowling. He was raised in Los Angeles, and from his own description had a very rough upbringing. His parents' marriage dissolved when he was three years old, and he developed a heroin addiction in his teenage years, occupying his time with varied acts of juvenile delinquency. At age 19, while working at the Los Angeles Free Press, he met the author Charles Bukowski who inspired him to hitchhike from Los Angeles to Rio de Janeiro in 1972. He arrived in South America, finding work as a deckhand and tattoo artist.

== Career ==
=== Fun City Tattoo ===
Returning to the United States in 1976, Shaw relocated to the Bowery neighborhood in Manhattans' Lower East Side where he opened Fun City Tattoo, the oldest tattoo shop in New York City, where he specialized in neo-tribal tattoos and tattooed celebrities as Johnny Depp, Iggy Pop, Jim Jarmusch, Kevin Sean Michaels, Max Cavalera (Sepultura) and Kate Moss. Tattooing, however, had been illegal in New York City in 1961, and wasn't legalized until 1997. Shaw later founded the first magazine exclusively dedicated to tattoos, International Tattoo Art in the 1980s.

In 1990, Jonathan Shaw, Johnny Depp, Iggy Pop and Jim Jarmusch founded the Death Is Certain Club to celebrate their friendship. The club involved each member getting a matching ring and tattoo.

=== Retirement and writing career ===
Shaw sold Fun City in 2002, after only five years of legal operation, to focus on writing. After 28 years tattooing, Jonathan retired from the profession in 2004 and moved back to Rio de Janeiro, where he wrote his first novel Narcisa: Our Lady of Ashes, published in 2008 by HarperCollins. Iggy Pop described Shaw as "the great nightmare anti-hero of the new age". His memoir, entitled Scab Vendor, was published in 2017.

== Bibliography ==
- Scab Vendor: Confessions of a Tattoo Artist. Turner. 2017. ISBN 9781681629155.
- Vintage Tattoo Flash: 100 Years of Traditional Tattoos from the Collection of Jonathan Shaw. powerHouse Books. 2016. ISBN 9781576877692.
- Narcisa: Our Lady of Ashes. Harper Perennial. 2008. ISBN 9780062354990.
