= Vera Marshe =

American character actress (1905–1984)

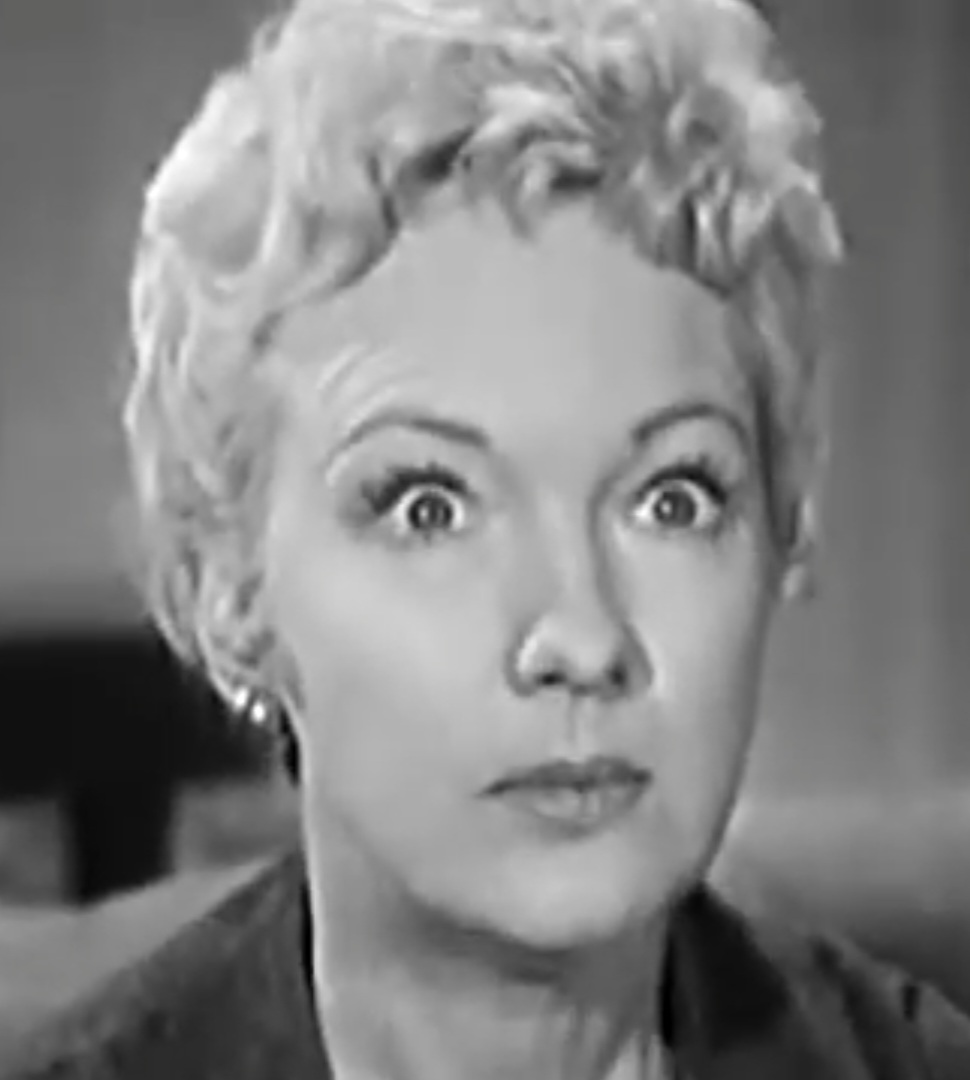
- Marshe in Meet Corliss Archer, 1954
- Born: Vera Merle Marsh; July 15, 1905; Sacred Heart, Minnesota, U.S.
- Died: March 25, 1984 (aged 78); Woodland Hills, Los Angeles, California, U.S.
- Occupation: Actress
- Years active: 1930–1966

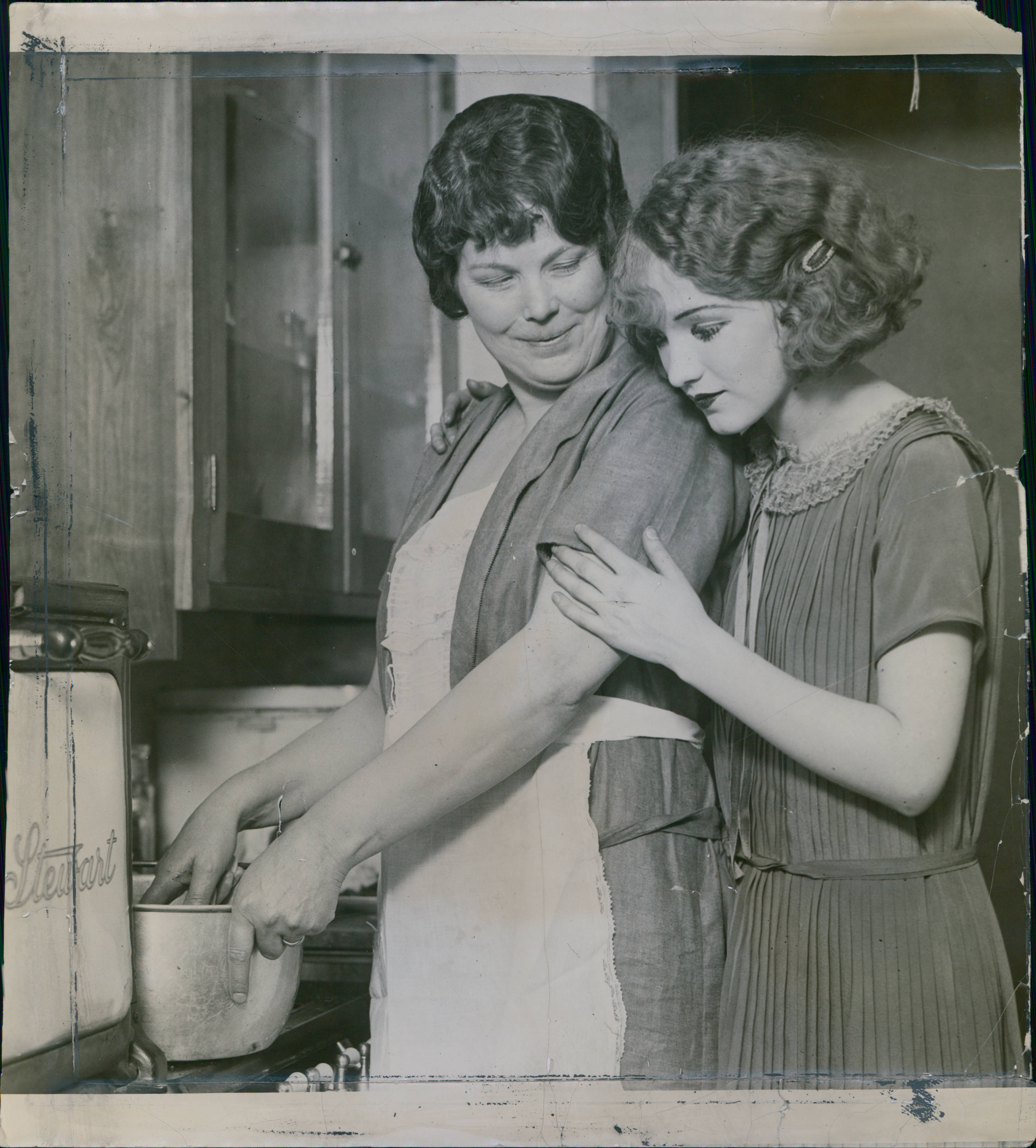
Vera and her mother in 1924

Vera Marshe (born Vera Merle Marsh; July 15, 1905 – March 25, 1984) was an American film and television character actress.

== Biography ==
Born in Sacred Heart, Minnesota and raised in Minneapolis, Minnesota, Marshe was the daughter of Marie Stensrud and Harry Theodore Marsh. She attended Madison and Clinton elementary schools and Central High School. Marshe began her career by appearing in a number of short films during the 30s. She also appeared onstage with Al Jolson in The Wonder Bar and starred opposite Fred Astaire in The Band Wagon after his sister Adele left the show to get married in 1932.

Onscreen, her first starring role—and the one which marked her transition from Marsh to Marshe—was opposite Eddie Foy Jr. in Nearly Naked (1933). She later focused on television during the 50s and 60s. Her final appearance was in the TV series Perry Mason (1959-1966). She's known for Way Out West (1930), Those Endearing Young Charms (1945), The Crimson Key (1947) and Tormented (1960). Vera died on March 25, 1984, at age 78.

== Filmography ==
Year	Title	Role	Notes
1930	Way Out West	La Belle Rosa	
1930	Good News	Girl	
1930	Madam Satan	Call of the Wild	
1933	Nearly Naked		
1945	Those Endearing Young Charms	Dot	
1945	The Phantom of 42nd Street	Ginger	
1945	Bedside Manner	Mrs. Mary Hastings	
1945	Getting Gertie's Garter	Anna - the Maid	
1946	Abie's Irish Rose	Mrs. Edna Gilchrist	
1947	Monsieur Verdoux	Mrs. Vicki Darwin	
1947	Danger Street	Amanda Matthews	
1947	The Crimson Key	Daisy 'Dizzy' Nelson	
1947	The Hucksters	Gloria, West Coast Secretary	
1947	Where There's Life	Hazel O'Brien	
1948	You Gotta Stay Happy	Mae	
1949	The Big Sombrero	Angie Burke	
1949	Miss Mink of 1949	Hortense	
1949	Post Office Investigator	Bubbles	
1950	Davy Crockett, Indian Scout	Mrs. Simms	
1950	Western Pacific Agent	Train Passenger	
1953	The Adventures of Superman	Ellen Hardy	S2, E5 "Shot in the Dark"
1958	The Space Children	Frieda Johnson	
1960	Tormented	Mrs. Hubbard	
