= Those Endearing Young Charms (film) =

1945 film by Lewis Allen

- Theatrical release poster
- Directed by: Lewis Allen
- Screenplay by: Jerome Chodorov (Note: Screenwriter Jerome Chodorov was the brother of playwright Edward Chodorov.)
- Based on: Those Endearing Young Charms (play) by Edward Chodorov
- Produced by: Bert Granet
- Starring: Robert Young; Laraine Day; Ann Harding; Bill Williams; Marc Cramer
- Cinematography: Ted Tetzlaff
- Edited by: Roland Gross
- Music by: Roy Webb
- Production company: RKO Pictures
- Distributed by: RKO Pictures
- Release date: June 19, 1945
- Running time: 81 minutes
- Country: United States
- Language: English

Those Endearing Young Charms is a 1945 American comedy film directed by Lewis Allen and written by Edward Chodorov from his play of the same name and starring Robert Young, Laraine Day, Ann Harding, Bill Williams and Marc Cramer. (Note: Those Endearing Young Charms was a propaganda film, one where Hollywood could use even romantic comedy to support the war effort.)

== Plot ==
In 1945, after Helen Brandt (Laraine Day) and her mother (Ann Harding) move from Ellsworth Falls to New York City, Helen finds a job as a perfume clerk at a department store while Mrs. Brandt works for the war relief effort. Jerry (Bill Williams), a boy just home from serving in France, likes Helen, but she only thinks of him as a "pal". His college buddy, USAAF Lieutenant Hank Travers (Robert Young), hears about Helen and worms his way onto a date that Jerry and Helen are on, asking Mrs. Brandt to go along.

At the dance, when the band plays "Those Endearing Young Charms", her mother begins to cry, confiding in Helen that it reminds her of Jerry's father, who she loved and lost. After taking Helen and Mrs. Brandt home that night, Hank makes a play for Helen, but she sees he is a womanizer and sends him home. The next day, Hank calls Helen, and tells her he wants to see her before he is shipped out.

While she is attracted to Hank, Helen fears that he is insincere, but her mother says not to do what she had done and lose her chance at love. On a drive to the seashore, Hank tries again to convince Helen he is serious about their relationship, even admitting that he had lied about being shipped out.

Helen returns home, telling her mother she really loves Hank. When his two-day pass is suddenly cancelled, Mrs. Brandt tells her to go to him before he flies back to the front. At his airfield, the two young lovers reunite, minutes before Hank is to take off. Helen promises to wait for him.

== Cast ==
- Robert Young as Lt. Hurley 'Hank' Travers
- Laraine Day as Helen Brandt
- Ann Harding as Mrs. Brandt
- Bill Williams as Jerry
- Marc Cramer as Capt. Larry Stowe
- Anne Jeffreys as Suzibelle
- Glen Vernon as Radioman 1st Class William Zantifar
- Norma Varden as Mrs. Woods
- Lawrence Tierney as Lt. Ted Brewster
- Vera Marshe as Dot

== Production ==
Edward Chodorov's play, Those Endearing Young Charms had only lasted two months on Broadway, but Samuel Goldwyn paid $75,000 for the screen rights, intending to showcase young actress Teresa Wright with Dana Andrews as her co-star. When she was not available, Joan Fontaine was approached, but RKO bought the rights for a Laraine Day vehicle. RKO borrowed Robert Young from MGM to play alongside Day in her first leading role, with Lewis Allen borrowed from Paramount to direct. Other roles went to RKO contract players.

Principal photography on Those Endearing Young Charms occurred from early January to-mid-February 1945.

== Reception ==
Those Endearing Young Charms was released on June 19, 1945, by RKO Pictures and made a profit of $644,000.

The New York Times film critic Bosley Crowther, in his review of Those Endearing Young Charms, wrote, "... there's no point in passing critical judgment on an artificial script, on slickly mechanical direction and performances in a make-believe style. The audience with which this writer saw the picture yesterday was made up, quite obviously, of shop-girls released for the Eisenhower parade. They seemed to love this tickling eyewash. So what's a fellow to say?"

In a recent review in TV Guide, Those Endearing Young Charms was described as: "This light nonsense, based on a play, is over talkative and lacks sincerity. There are some moments of charm, but the unevenness of the cast works against the production, resulting in a hit-and-miss romantic comedy."
