= Sing Your Way Home =

1945 film by Anthony Mann

- Directed by: Anthony Mann
- Screenplay by: William Bowers
- Story by: Edmund Joseph; Bart Lytton
- Produced by: Bert Granet
- Starring: Jack Haley; Marcy McGuire; Glen Vernon; Anne Jeffreys
- Cinematography: Frank Redman
- Edited by: Harry Marker
- Music by: Roy Webb
- Production company: RKO Radio Pictures
- Distributed by: RKO Radio Pictures
- Release date: November 14, 1945 (United States)
- Running time: 72 minutes
- Country: United States
- Language: English

Sing Your Way Home is a 1945 American musical film directed by Anthony Mann and featuring Jack Haley and Marcy McGuire.

== Cast ==
- Jack Haley as Steve Kimball
- Marcy McGuire as Bridget Forrester
- Glen Vernon as Jimmy McCue
- Anne Jeffreys as Kay Lawrence
- Donna Lee as Terry
- Emory Parnell as Ship's Captain

== Accolades ==
Nominated

- Academy Awards: Best Music, Original Song - Allie Wrubel (music) and Herb Magidson (lyrics) - For the song "I'll Buy That Dream"; 1946.
