= Seven Days' Leave (1942 film) =

1942 film by Tim Whelan

- Directed by: Tim Whelan
- Written by: William Bowers; Ralph Spence; Curtis Kenyon; Kenneth Earl
- Produced by: Tim Whelan
- Starring: Lucille Ball; Victor Mature
- Cinematography: Robert De Grasse
- Edited by: Robert Wise
- Music by: Roy Webb
- Production company: RKO Radio Pictures
- Distributed by: RKO Radio Pictures
- Release date: November 13, 1942 (U.S.)
- Running time: 82 minutes
- Language: English
- Budget: $561,325
- Box office: $1.2 million (US rentals)

Seven Days' Leave is a 1942 American musical comedy film about a soldier (Victor Mature) who has seven days to marry an heiress (Lucille Ball) in order to inherit $100,000.

== Plot ==
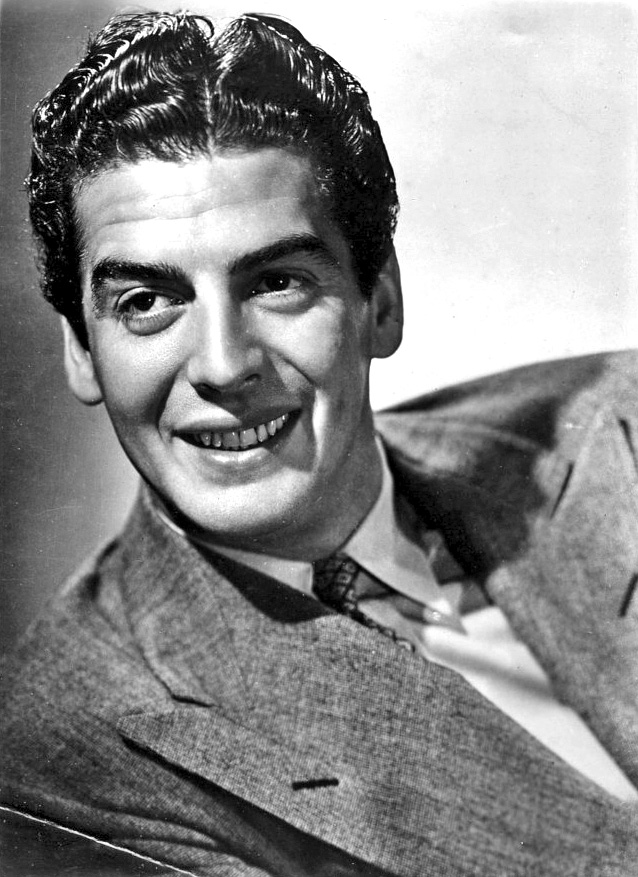
Victor Mature as Johnny Grey

Johnny Grey, Speak Jackson and Buddy "Clarky" Clark were musicians in the famous Les Brown band before they joined the US Army. Before being shipped out to Japan, their company grants them seven-day leaves. That night, they attend a Les Brown concert, where Johnny renews his romance with singer Mapy Cortés.

Johnny then discovers that his great-grandfather's has left him $100,000 in his will. Overwhelmed with excitement, Johnny promises to buy Mapy a diamond engagement ring. Johnny goes to New York City to claim his inheritance, accompanied by Clarky, Jackson, and their friend Bitsy. Once there, Throckmorton P. Gildersleeve, the estate lawyer, explains the terms of the will to Johnny. He must marry a descendant of the Havelock-Allen family in order to collect the money.

Johnny is reluctant to break up with Mapy until he meets Terry Havelock-Allen, the elder daughter of the family. The only problem is that Terry is engaged to financial advisor Ralph Bell. Johnny decides to pursue Terry. He enlists the help of his friend Jackson, who is an amateur impressionist. Jackson first calls Ralph pretending to be Ronald Colman, the calls again, this time as Lionel Barrymore. On both calls, Jackson tells Ralph to come immediately to Los Angeles to provide financial advice.

With Ralph gone, Johnny takes Terry on a date to a radio broadcast of the quiz program Truth or Consequences. The next day, the couple go on a picnic. Returning to the Havelock-Allen mansion, she and Johnny kiss. Flustered, Terry orders her butler to throw Johnny out. Afterwards, her younger sister Mickey tells Terry that she should marry Johnny and not Ralph.

By this point, Johnny is genuinely in love with Terry. Mapy breaks off the engagement after realizing that. Mickey tells Johnny that Terry secretly loves him. Terry is contemplating eloping with Ralph when Johnny arrives at the mansion, After they kiss, Terry and Johnny decide to get married. But before Johnny can tell Terry about will, Gildersleeve blurts out its conditions. Believing that she was duped, Terry breaks up with Johnny.

At that point, a furious Ralph arrives at the mansion. Having discovered that Jackson scammed him. Ralph slugs Jackson and Johnny. At that point, a brawl ensues. The military police are called and they take Jackson, Bitsy, Clark and Johnny to the stockade. The next day, the four soldiers watch from their jail cell as their company boards the ship to Japan. Mapy visits Terry and tells her that Johnny does love her. At the end of the film, Johnny and Terry get married, Johnny gets the $100,000 and the four soldiers rejoin their company aboard ship.

== Cast ==
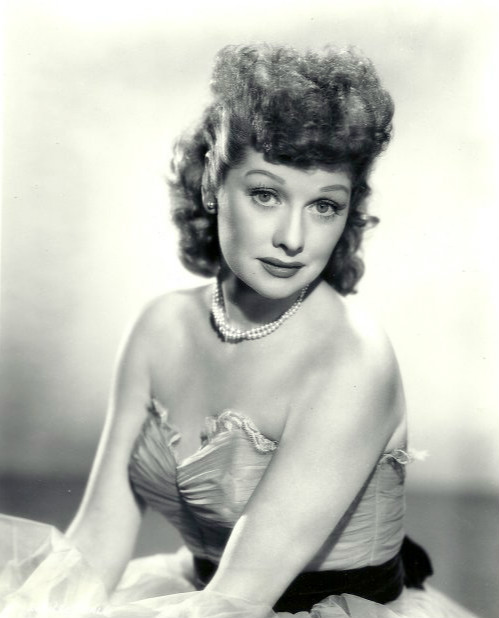
Lucille Ball as Havelock-Allen

- Victor Mature as Johnny Grey
- Lucille Ball as Terry Havelock-Allen
- Harold Peary as Throckmorton P. Gildersleeve aka The Great Gildersleeve
- Mapy Cortés as Mapy Cortés
- Ginny Simms as herself
- Les Brown as himself
- Freddy Martin as himself
- Marcy McGuire as Mickey Havelock-Allen
- Arnold Stang as Bitsy
- Buddy Clark as himself
- Lynn, Royce and Vanya
- Ralph Edwards
- Peter Lind Hayes as Speak Jackson

== Production ==
Seven Days. Leave was the idea of RKO executives. It was originally known as Sweet or Hot. Filming took place in June 1942. According to the columnist Hedda Hopper, Mature, Ball and Tim Whelan had a massive fight on set one day that held up filming for an hour.

The film features the casts of several popular NBC Golden Age of Radio shows of the time. Whelan discovered Marcy McGuire singing in a nightclub in Chicago. He arranged for a screen test and cast her in the film.

== Songs ==
Music by Jimmy McHugh, Lyrics by Frank Loesser

- Please Won't You Leave My Girl Alone
- Can't Get Out of This Mood (Ginny Simms and Freddy Martin Orchestra)
- You Speak My Language (Mapy Cortés, Sergio Orta, Victor Mature and Les Brown and His Band of Renown)
- A Touch of Texas (Marcy McGuire, Peter Lind Hayes, Harold Peary, Mature and Freddy Martin Orchestra)
- Soft Hearted (Freddy Martin Orchestra)
- I Get the Neck of the Chicken (McGuire)
- Puerto Rico

== Reception ==
=== Box office ===
The film was a hit at the box office and earned RKO a profit of $673,000. It led to a follow-up film about the navy, Seven Days Ashore (1944).
