= Peter Marshall (entertainer) =

American game show host, performer, singer (1926–2024)

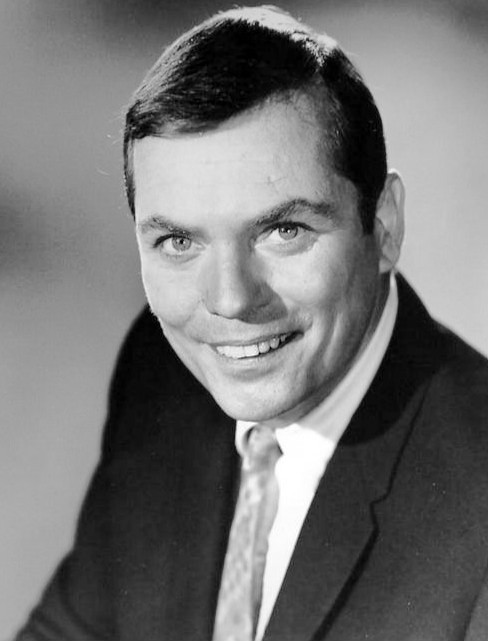
- Marshall in 1965
- Born: Ralph Pierre LaCock; March 30, 1926; Clarksburg, West Virginia, U.S.
- Died: August 15, 2024 (aged 98); Los Angeles, California, U.S.
- Occupations: Actor; singer; TV host; radio personality
- Years active: 1950–2021
- Known for: Original host of Hollywood Squares (1966–1981)
- Spouses: Nadene R. Teaford (m. 1947; div. 1973) Sally Carter-Ihnat (m. 1977; div. 1983) Laurie Stewart (m. 1989)
- Children: 4, including Pete LaCock
- Relatives: Joanne Dru (sister)

Ralph Pierre LaCock (March 30, 1926 – August 15, 2024), better known by his stage name Peter Marshall, was an American game show host, television and radio personality, singer, and actor. He was the original host of The Hollywood Squares from 1966 to 1981 and had almost fifty television, movie, and Broadway credits.

Marshall was given his stage name by John Robert Powers. Powers had chosen the last name Marshall for Peter's sister (who later chose to use Joanne Dru instead), and Peter adopted it early in his career and paired it with an anglicized version of his middle name.

== Early life ==
Marshall was born Ralph Pierre LaCock on March 30, 1926 to Ralph and Jean LaCock, a show business family, in Clarksburg, West Virginia. Following his father's suicide when Marshall was 10, he moved to New York City to be with his mother, a costume designer. After he graduated from high school, he was drafted into the U.S. Army in 1944 and stationed in Italy. He was originally in the artillery, but was recruited to be a disc jockey at a radio station in Naples. He was discharged in 1946 with the rank of staff sergeant.

His elder sister Joan became the film and television actress known as Joanne Dru. She was best known for her roles in such films as Red River, She Wore a Yellow Ribbon, and All the King's Men.

== Career ==
=== Early career ===
In the 1950s, Marshall earned his living as part of a comedy act with Tommy Noonan, appearing in night clubs, on television variety shows, and in films including Starlift (1951), The Rookie (1959), and Swingin' Along (1962).

Marshall appeared in the 1958 episode "The Big Hoax" of the syndicated television series Harbor Command. In 1963, he appeared as Lucy's brother-in-law, Hughie, in The Lucy Show episode "Lucy's Sister Pays A Visit".

=== The Hollywood Squares ===
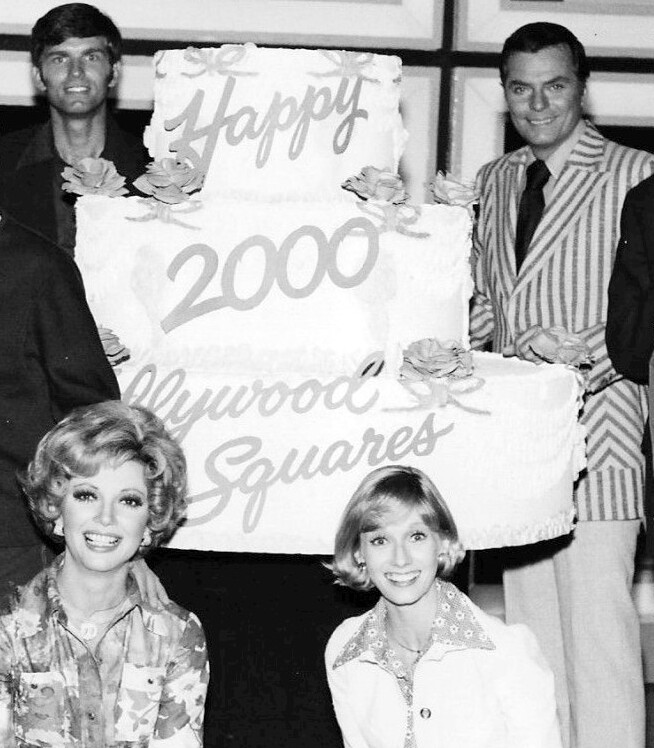
From top to bottom: Marshall (right) with Kent McCord (left), Ruta Lee (left) and Sandy Duncan celebrating the 2000th episode of The Hollywood Squares, 1974

Although Marshall occasionally worked in film and television, he could not find regular work in the industry until his friend Morey Amsterdam recommended him to fill in for Bert Parks (who emceed the pilot) as the host of the game show The Hollywood Squares in 1966.

Though Marshall did not initially want the job, he took it in order to ensure that rival comic Dan Rowan would not get it. Marshall's grudge stemmed back to when he and Noonan had written material for Rowan and Martin, but Rowan had shown virtually no respect to Noonan when Tommy Noonan fell terminally ill in the mid-1960s (as opposed to Dick Martin, who was fully supportive of Noonan's fight). He expected to spend 13 weeks as host, then return to Broadway, but ultimately hosted for 15 years and more than 5,000 episodes. The show was canceled in 1980, but production continued in syndication into 1981.

=== Television ===
Marshall was the host of his own short-lived syndicated music and comedy series, The Peter Marshall Variety Show, which aired during the 1976–1977 season in markets in the United States.

After the completion of the final run of The Hollywood Squares in 1981, Marshall continued working in game shows and playing character roles. He appeared on the game shows Fantasy (1982) with cohost Leslie Uggams, All-Star Blitz (1985), Yahtzee (1988), the "East Hollywood Squares" skit on In Living Color (1994), and Reel to Reel (1998).

In 1986, Marshall portrayed Bob Kenny, game show host accused of murder of a game show contestant on an episode "To Live and Die on TV" on Sledge Hammer!.

In 1989, Marshall hosted the unaired pilot for 3rd Degree! (a Burt & Bert Production in association with Kline & Friends). When the series was picked up for syndication, show producer Bert Convy decided to leave his position as the host of the syndicated edition of Win, Lose or Draw and take Marshall's place on 3rd Degree without informing Marshall. Marshall filed a lawsuit against Convy for the action, but later dropped it after Convy's diagnosis of terminal brain cancer was made public.

In 2002, he returned to the new version of The Hollywood Squares as a panelist during a Game Show Week hosted by Tom Bergeron. Marshall occupied the prestigious center square. For one day that week, Marshall took his old position at the podium to host while Bergeron was the center square.

=== Other work ===
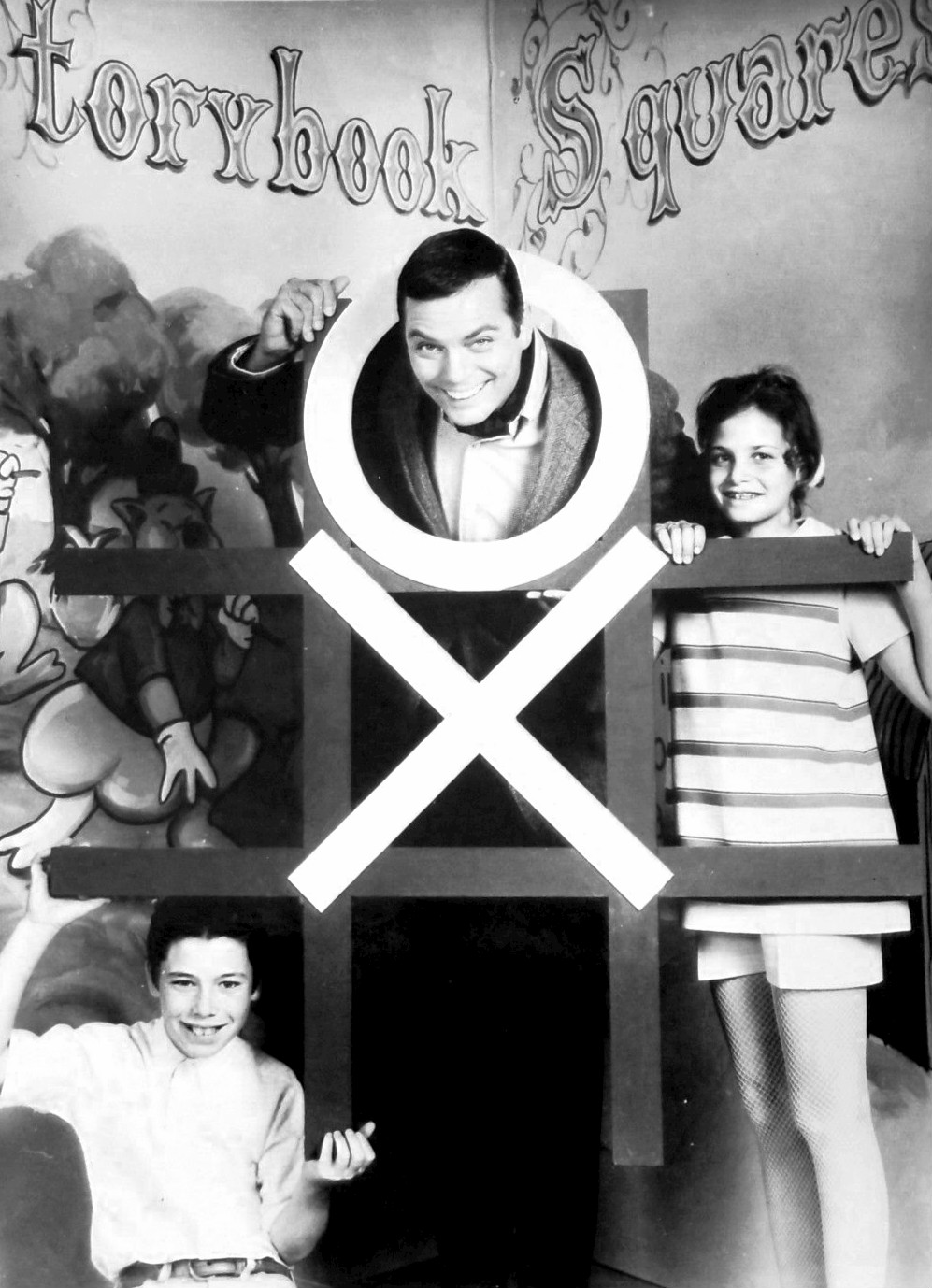
Marshall while hosting Storybook Squares, 1969

Marshall hosted a popular mid-day radio show for more than 15 years on the Music of Your Life radio network. He and singer Debby Boone are featured as co-hosts in a successful infomercial presented by Time Life, the Music of Your Life Collection. Featuring hit songs from the 1950s, 1960s, and 1970s, the infomercial was re-released in 2016 after selling more than a million CDs a few years prior.

In 1979, Marshall sang "Back Home Again in Indiana" at the Indianapolis 500. That same year, he played Dr. Todd Gardner, author of a bestseller, in The Love Boat.

In 1982, he had a small role in the film adaptation of Annie as radio announcer Bert Healy.

In 2002, Marshall published a book about his experiences, Backstage with the Original Hollywood Square. In 2009, he appeared on television promoting compact disc hits from the Big Band era, and also hosted a two-hour PBS special, The Big Band Years. In 2010, Marshall, along with Monty Hall and Wink Martindale, appeared with their wives on a special Game Show Legend version of The Newlywed Game. The special was hosted by Bob Eubanks; the Martindales won the game.

In 2012, Marshall hosted an entertainment-filled memorial service in Branson, Missouri, for singer Andy Williams. In 2014, Marshall returned to West Virginia to host four games of The West Virginia Squares as part of Charleston's FestivALL. The game, which featured questions about the state's history, included other notable West Virginia natives such as Joyce Dewitt and Landau Murphy. In 2017, he narrated the Rose Marie documentary film Wait for Your Laugh.

Marshall retired from the entertainment industry in 2021, following a bout with COVID-19.

=== Theater ===
Marshall's Broadway credits include Skyscraper and La Cage aux Folles. Marshall appeared in the London 1962 West End production of the musical Bye Bye Birdie, a satire on American popular culture in the 1950s inspired by singer Elvis Presley receiving a draft notice into the Army. Marshall played the lead character of Albert Peterson, who writes a song for the pop-singing sensation Conrad Birdie (played by Marty Wilde), opposite Chita Rivera. The production ran for 268 performances.

== Personal life and death ==
Marshall married his third wife, Laurie Stewart, on Saturday, August 19, 1989, and had four children and two stepchildren from his previous marriages. He had a home in Palm Desert, California. His son Pete is a former Major League Baseball player who spent nine years playing for the Chicago Cubs and Kansas City Royals.

Diagnosed with COVID-19 in January 2021, and discharged from a hospital in February in what was considered a hospice situation, Marshall survived the virus at home with a new doctor and 24-hour nursing care. Marshall's 68-year-old son, David LaCock, died in August 2021 from COVID-19 in Hawaii.

Marshall died of kidney failure at his home in Encino, Los Angeles, California, on August 15, 2024, at the age of 98. He was cremated through the Neptune Society, and his ashes were given to his surviving relatives.

== Awards ==
Marshall won the Daytime Emmy Award for Outstanding Game Show Host four times. In 2006, he received the annual Bill Cullen Award for Lifetime Achievement, from the non-profit organization Game Show Congress. On October 13, 2007, Marshall was one of the first inductees into the American TV Game Show Hall of Fame in Las Vegas.

In November 2013, Marshall was inducted into the West Virginia Music Hall of Fame. He was introduced by Nick Clooney.

== Selected filmography ==
Year	Title	Role	Notes
1953	The 49th Man	Leo Wayne	
1959	The Rookie	MSgt. Pete Marshall	
1961	Swingin' Along	Duke	
1964	Ensign Pulver	Carney	
1964	The Cavern	Lt. Peter Carter	
1974	Happy Anniversary and Goodbye	Greg Carter	
1982	Annie	Bert Healy	

Preceded by Bert Parks in CBS Pilot	Host of The Hollywood Squares; 1966–1981	Succeeded by Jon Bauman in the Match Game-Hollywood Squares Hour
Preceded by First Winner	Daytime Emmy Award for Outstanding Game Show Host; 1974 and 1975	Succeeded by Allen Ludden
Preceded by Dick Clark	Daytime Emmy Award for Outstanding Game Show Host; 1980 and 1981	Succeeded by Bob Barker
