= Beat the Band (musical) =

Beat the Band is a musical in two acts with music by Johnny Green, lyrics by George Marion Jr., and a book co-authored by Marion and George Abbott. Don Walker was the orchestrator of the music. The show features the only score composed by Green for Broadway where it premiered in 1942.

== Performance history ==
Directed and produced by Abbott, Beat the Band premiered on Broadway at the 46th Street Theatre on October 14, 1942. It ran there for a total of 67 performances; closing on December 12, 1942. The choreographer for the show was David Lichine, and designs for the production included sets by Samuel Leve and costumes by Freddy Wittop. The cast included Jack Whiting as Damon Dillingham, Jerry Lester as Hugo Dillingham, Susan Miller as Querida, Toni Gilman as Willow Willoughby, Romo Vincent as Buster da Costa, Joan Caulfield as Veronica, Juanita Juarez as Mamita, Eunice Healey as Princess, Averell Harris as Don Domingo, Ralph Bunker as Mr. Pirosch, and Doris Dowling as the Bell Girl among others.

The musical was adapted into the film Beat the Band (1947, RKO Pictures). However, the film version made changes to the plot and did not use any of the music from the stage production.

== Critical assessment ==
Brooks Atkinson of The New York Times stated, "Although Beat the Band is not one of Mr. Abbott's most triumphant festivals, it is fresh, interesting and overflowing with vitality. But beware of the brasses. They are on fire." Time stated in its review, "The lyrics are forced. Composer Green ('Body & Soul, I’m Yours') has turned out one or two lusty tunes, and gone to town with 'Steam Is on the Beam', but his score is on the whole unexciting." In contrast The New Yorker critic wrote, "If you happen to admire Beat the Band, it will be principally because of the music and lyrics, which have been provided by Johnny Green and George Marion, Jr. Probably nothing conveys less to the reader than the titles of songs he hasn’t heard, but I can’t help noting that “Steam Is on the Beam,” “America Loves a Band,” and maybe “Every Other Heartbeat” are as spirited and literate as anything I’ve heard this season."

Musical theatre historian Dan Dietz said, "It appears that Beat the Band's unique score might well be a defining moment that took the traditional format of a Broadway score and married it to the contemporary sound of the era's popular music, much in the way Burt Bacharach's score for Promises, Promises encapsulated the sound of late 1960s pop music."
