= Riffraff (1947 film) =

1947 film directed by Ted Tetzlaff

Riff-Raff
- Movie poster
- Directed by: Ted Tetzlaff
- Written by: Martin Rackin
- Produced by: Nat Holt; Jack J. Gross (executive producer)
- Starring: Pat O'Brien; Anne Jeffreys; Walter Slezak
- Cinematography: George E. Diskant
- Edited by: Philip Martin
- Music by: Roy Webb
- Color process: Black-and-white
- Production company: RKO Radio Pictures
- Distributed by: RKO Radio Pictures
- Release dates: June 28, 1947 (New York City); September 15, 1947 (U.S.)
- Running time: 80 minutes
- Language: English

Riff-Raff is a 1947 American film noir starring Pat O'Brien, Anne Jeffreys and Walter Slezak. It was directed by Ted Tetzlaff, who later directed The Window (1949) and worked as a cinematographer for over 100 films, including Alfred Hitchcock's Notorious (1946). The music was composed by Roy Webb and Joan Whitney.

== Plot ==
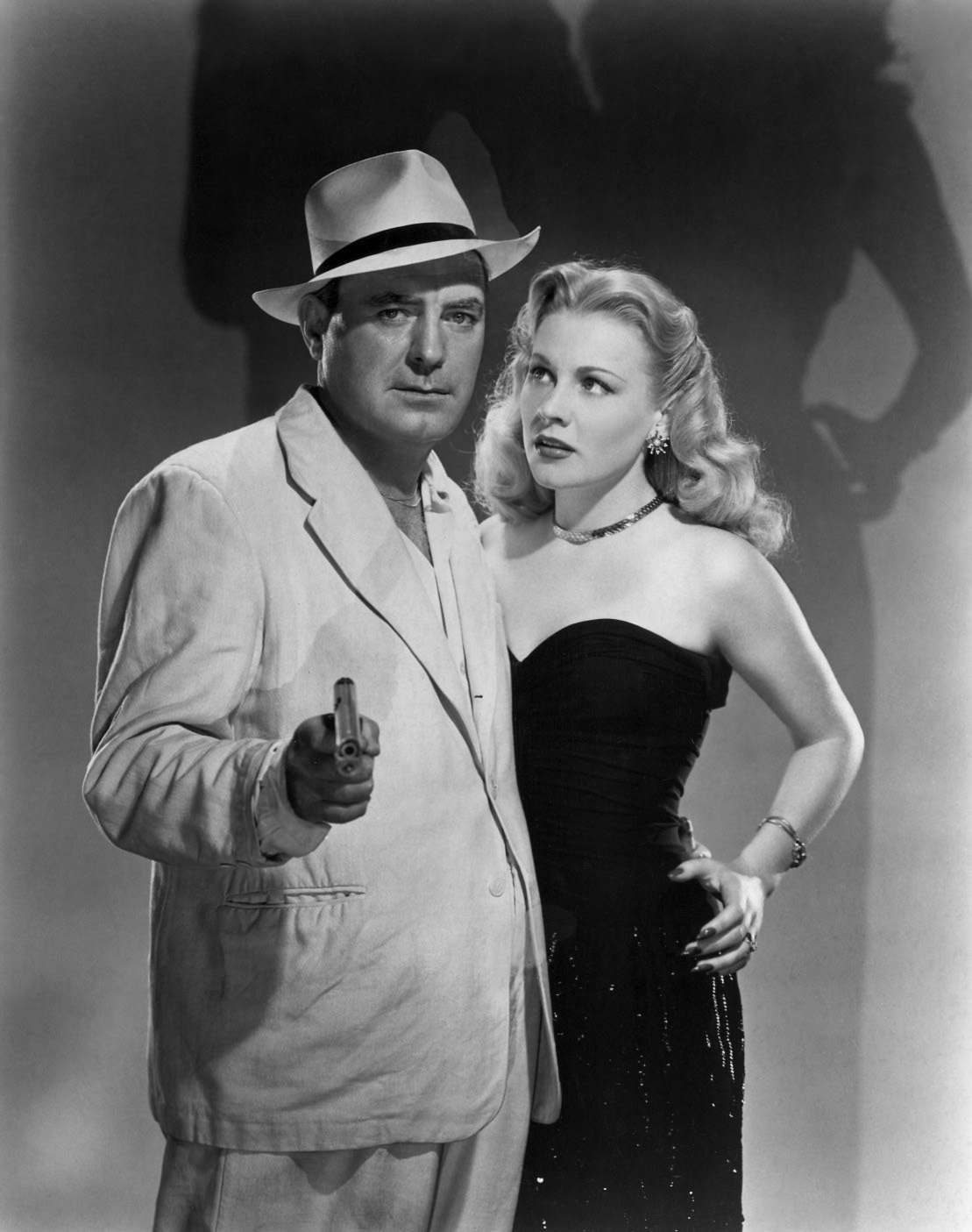
Pat O'Brien and Anne Jeffreys

During a storm in Peru, a cargo plane with two passengers leaves for Panama. Midflight, the co-pilot responds to an alarm that the plane's door is open. He finds just one passenger, Charles Hasso (Marc Krah), who insists he tried to stop the other passenger from jumping out the door. Hasso takes the dead man's briefcase through Panamanian customs, after briefly being questioned by Major Rues (George Givot) of the Panama secret police.

Hasso hires private investigator Dan Hammer (Pat O'Brien) as his bodyguard for two days. While Hammer is changing, Hasso surreptitiously clips a map from the stolen briefcase to Hammer's room divider.

Meanwhile, oil executive Walter Gredson (Jerome Cowan) calls Hammer to ask for a meeting. Gredson was expecting a man from Peru to arrive with a map of wildcat oil wells in Peru. Since the man jumped from the plane, Gredson suspects the other passenger has the map. He contracts Hammer for $5,000 to find Hasso and the map.

At a nightclub, Maxine Manning (Anne Jeffreys) plays for Hammer's attention. He invites her to come by his office after work. Artist Eric Molinar (Walter Slezak) tries to hire him as a guide, but Hammer declines.

Hammer visits Hasso's hotel and finds him dead in the bathtub. He heads back to his office, only to find it ransacked and Maxine unconscious. Molinar stops by, and Hammer deduces he is the one who trashed the office looking for the map.

In the morning, Maxine visits Gredson who promises the map will make them rich enough to do whatever they want. He asks Maxine to keep on surveilling Hammer.

Molinar returns to Hammer's office with two heavies and idly sketches the neighborhood while they beat the detective. Hammer has no idea where the map is. Molinar and his thugs visit Gredson. Maxine calls to say the map is at Hammer's office. Gredson is murdered by Molinar's men.

When they arrive back at Hammer's office, he fights for his life with Maxine's help. During the melee, Molinar spots the map and runs off with it. Hammer subdues the thugs and tells Maxine to call the police.

While Molinar is circuitously driven through the streets in Pop's (Percy Kilbride) ancient taxi, Hammer pursues him on foot. Pop convinces Molinar the airport will be surveilled and that he should hide out in town for a few days before lamming. Pop takes Molinar to a building and tells him to go in through the back entrance.

Hammer follows Molinar into the building and slugs him only to realize he is in Major Rues' office. Hammer takes the map out of Molinar's pocket and leaves him in police custody. Back at his office, Hammer sells the map to Gredson's colleague at the oil company and happily reunites with Maxine.

== Cast ==
- Pat O'Brien as Dan Hammer
- Anne Jeffreys as Maxine Manning
- Walter Slezak as Eric Molinar
- Percy Kilbride as Pop
- Jerome Cowan as Walter Gredson
- George Givot as Major Rues
- Jason Robards Sr. as Mr. Domingues
- Marc Krah as Charles Hasso
- Fred Essler as Hernandez
- William Alland as Trumpy
- Hector V. Sarno as Pedro, Concierge
- Julian Rivero as Airport Manager

== Production ==
The film was based on an original screenplay by Martin Rackin. It was known first as The Big Angle and was bought by RKO in February 1946. Rackin had previously written two films for Pat O'Brien at RKO, Bombardier and Marine Raiders, and he was attached to the project from the start. Rackin reportedly wrote the story while serving in the air force. By May the title had been changed to Riff-Raff and Walter Slezak was signed to support.

At one stage the film was known as The Amazing Mr Hammer.

Cinematographer Ted Tezlaff had started directing motion pictures before serving in World War II. When he returned to Hollywood he shot a number of films for RKO as cinematographer but he wanted to return to directing. Producer Jack Gross assigned him to direct Riffraff, although it meant Tetzlaff took a salary cut to get the job.

Pat O'Brien wrote in his memoirs in 1967 that Rackin "had skill as a dramatist, and his comedy writing was superb. I went to [RKO head of production] Charlie Koerner and asked that he be given a studio contract. The boy had been in the Air Force and the going was not too easy after his discharge from the service. Marty is now one of the top executives at Paramount Studios. Strange I don't hear from him any more."

== Reception ==
Variety noted "Picture puts particular emphasis on lens work. It's loaded with camera angles whose unusualness add to interest and meller mood. Photography is by George E. Diskant, working under director Ted Tetzlaff, himself a former top lenser. Latter's direction is generally strong, aided by Martin Rackin's punchy script. Nat Holt's production guidance backs action with realistic values."

The Los Angeles Times said "someone took pains to make it hang together pretty well" and that O'Brien "plays his part with casual skill".

The New York Times said it "only emerges a notch above the run-of-the-murder adventure despite a thoroughly engrossing beginning and some crisp dialogue."

Arthur Lyons called the wordless opening sequence "one of filmdom's absolute classic beginnings".
