= Swingin' Along =

1961 film by Charles Barton

- Directed by: Charles Barton
- Screenplay by: Jameson Brewer
- Produced by: Jack Leewood
- Starring: Tommy Noonan; Peter Marshall; Barbara Eden; Carol Christensen
- Cinematography: Arthur E. Arling
- Edited by: Betty Steinberg
- Music by: Arthur Morton
- Distributed by: 20th Century Fox
- Release date: January 1961
- Running time: 74 minutes
- Country: United States
- Language: English
- Budget: $800,000

Swingin' Along is a 1961 American comedy film directed by Charles Barton. The film, which was released by 20th Century Fox, marked the final appearance of the comedy team of Tommy Noonan and Peter Marshall. The film focuses on Noonan as a courier who dreams of becoming a songwriter and Marshall as a con artist who wants to enter Noonan's original composition in a music competition. The film co-stars Barbara Eden and features musical performances by Ray Charles, Bobby Vee and Roger Williams.

According to Peter Marshall, the film was originally planned under the title Double Trouble and the screenplay was originally written for Dean Martin and Jerry Lewis. It was later re-released with the Double Trouble title.

== Plot ==
Freddy Merkle never finishes anything. He has a half-done painting, half a sculpture and a sonata he's been composing for quite a while. His aunt, Sophie, encourages him to finish something he starts, so he can marry his girlfriend. However Freddy, a delivery boy, can't find the inspiration.

Inside a pool room, Freddy runs into Duke, a fast-talking operator. When Freddie mentions a songwriting contest with a $2,500 first prize Duke becomes his "manager." At the coaxing of Duke and Ginny, the song is finally finished, but the sheet music blows away in the wind.

Freddy, forlorn as usual, decides to kill himself, but he can't even get that right. He's at the end of his rope when a kindly priest discovers the song, submits it to the contest and, sure enough, it becomes the winner.

== Cast ==
- Tommy Noonan as Freddy
- Peter Marshall as Duke
- Barbara Eden as Carol
- Connie Gilchrist as Aunt Sophie
- Carol Christensen as Ginny
- Mike Mazurki as Sam, the bookie
- Ted Knight as Priest
- Ray Charles as himself
- Bobby Vee as himself
- Roger Williams as himself

== Production ==
The film was developed by Robert Lippert. Then Buddy Adler took it off Lippert's slate and made it a main Fox production. It was filmed for $800,000.

== Reception ==
Release of the film was delayed. The film was re edited by Robert Lippert. This included adding some musical numbers.

== See also ==
- List of American films of 1961
