= Beat the Band (film) =

1947 film by John H. Auer

- Theatrical release poster
- Directed by: John H. Auer
- Screenplay by: Lawrence Kimble; Clarence Kimble; Arthur A. Ross
- Based on: Beat the Band by George Abbott; George Marion Jr.
- Produced by: Michael Kraike
- Starring: Frances Langford; Ralph Edwards; Phillip Terry; Gene Krupa; June Clayworth
- Cinematography: Frank Redman
- Edited by: Samuel E. Beetley
- Music by: Leigh Harline
- Production company: RKO Pictures
- Distributed by: RKO Pictures
- Release date: February 19, 1947
- Running time: 67 minutes
- Country: United States
- Language: English

Beat the Band is a 1947 American musical film directed by John H. Auer and written by Lawrence Kimble, Clarence Kimble and Arthur A. Ross. It is based on the 1942 Broadway musical Beat the Band. The film stars Frances Langford, Ralph Edwards, Phillip Terry, Gene Krupa and June Clayworth. The film was released on February 19, 1947, by RKO Pictures.

== Plot ==
A small town girl named Ann Rogers (Frances Langford) is fooled by a bandleader posing as an opera teacher, another man’s wife posing as the opera teacher’s wife, and $3,000 of her own money stolen to pay for musicians in the band.

== Cast ==
- Frances Langford as Ann Rogers
- Ralph Edwards as Eddie Martin
- Phillip Terry as Damon Dillingham
- Gene Krupa as himself
- June Clayworth as Willow Martin
- Mabel Paige as Mrs. Peters
- Andrew Tombes as 'Professor' Enrico Blanchetti / Mr. Dillingham
- Donald MacBride as P. Aloysius Duff
- Mira McKinney as Mrs. Elvira Rogers
- Harry Harvey, Sr. as Mr. Rogers
- Grady Sutton as Harold
