= Robert J. Wilke =

American actor (1914–1989)

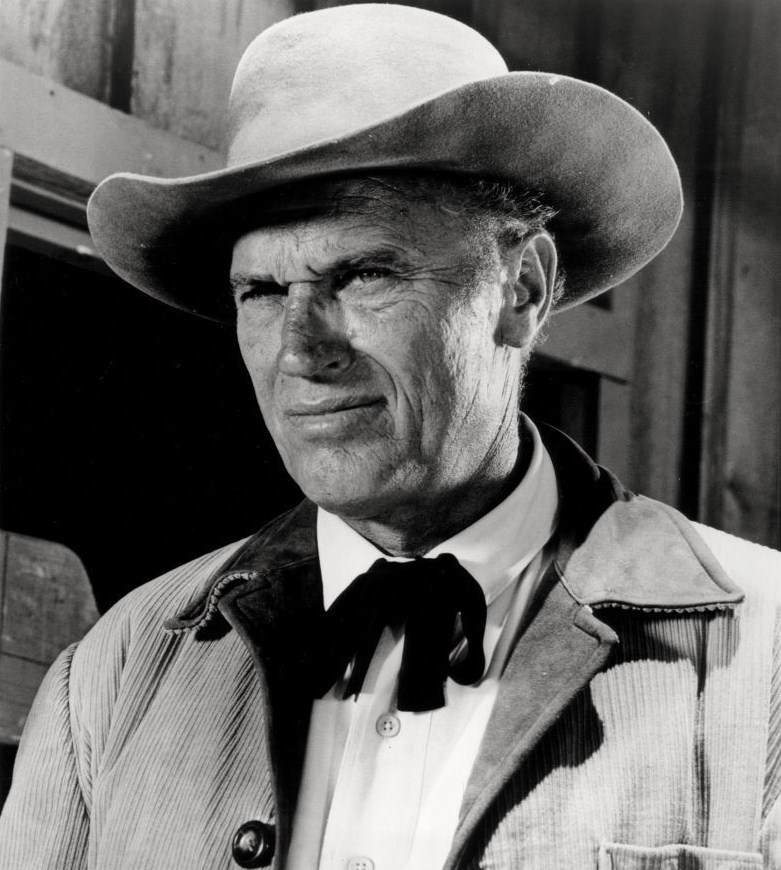
- Wilke in Death Valley Days (1966)
- Born: Robert Joseph Wilke; May 18, 1914; Cincinnati, Ohio, U.S.
- Died: March 28, 1989 (aged 74); Los Angeles, California, U.S.
- Occupation: Actor
- Years active: 1936–1981
- Known for: Westerns
- Spouse: Patricia Wilke
- Children: 1

Robert Joseph Wilke (May 18, 1914 – March 28, 1989) was an American film and television actor noted primarily for his roles as villains, mostly in Westerns.

== Early years ==
Wilke was a native of Cincinnati. Before going into acting, he had a variety of jobs, including working in a high-dive act at the Chicago World's Fair in 1933–1934.

== Career ==
Wilke started as a stuntman in the 1930s and his first appearance on screen was in San Francisco (1936). He soon began to acquire regular character parts, mainly as a heavy, and made his mark when, along with Lee Van Cleef and Sheb Wooley, he played one of the "three men waiting at the station" in High Noon (1952).

=== Westerns ===
Wilke appeared in many television Westerns, including seven episodes each of NBC's Laramie and CBS's Gunsmoke.

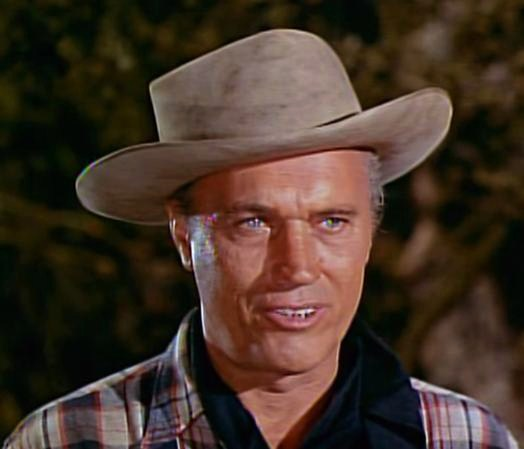
Robert J. Wilke in a 1960 episode of Bonanza

Wilke played a hired gun in The Far Country (1954) and continued to work steadily in films and television over the next 20 years. More Western credits followed in Man of the West (1958) and numerous lesser-known films.

In 1957 he played the role of the Marshall of a town named Ansara in the Wagon Train episode "The Jud Steele Story".

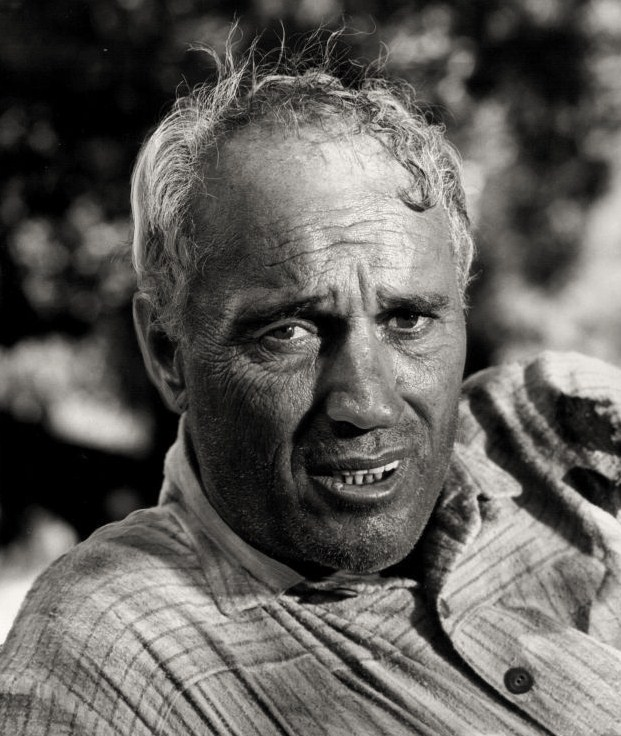
Wilke in 1963

In 1960 Wilke appeared in The Magnificent Seven as the railroad bully, Wallace, who was quickly killed off by James Coburn. He also appeared in Days of Heaven (1978) as the farm foreman.

Wilke guest-starred on many other television Westerns, including Maverick, Tales of Wells Fargo, Have Gun – Will Travel, Bronco, The Westerner, Lawman, Wanted: Dead or Alive, Zorro, The Rifleman, and Rango.

=== Other roles ===
Outside of Westerns, Wilke appeared in From Here to Eternity (1953) and 20,000 Leagues Under the Sea (1954). In the former film, Wilke's character tells Maggio he has guard duty, which begins a series of events leading to the plot's climax. In the later film, he was cast as the first mate of the Nautilus. It is Wilke who, in the film, warns Captain Nemo that a giant squid is approaching the ship, and who utters the line "We understand, sir, and we're with you", when Nemo announces his final intentions.

His drama/adventure roles included U.S. Marshal, Peter Gunn, Tarzan, Bourbon Street Beat, 77 Sunset Strip, and The Untouchables. In 1953 Wilke, playing a henchman for an East European counterfeiter, shoved John Hamilton and George Reeves into side-by-side steam cabinets, locked them in, turned up the thermostat and left them to bake in "Perry White's Scoop", an episode of the Adventures of Superman.

Wilke played Deputy Sheriff Connors in the 1963 episode "The Case of the Drowsy Mosquito" on CBS' Perry Mason. He portrayed golf professional Danny Donnigan in a 1962 episode, "Robbie the Caddie", on the ABC sitcom My Three Sons. In 1964 Wilke played Tom Carter, the golf instructor of Lucy Carmichael (Lucille Ball), in The Lucy Show episode "Lucy Takes Up Golf".

Wilke's final film role was Gen. Barnicke in the 1981 comedy Stripes.

== Golf ==
Wilke was an excellent golfer. Author Dan Jenkins, in his book The Dogged Victims of Inexorable Fate, describes a golf match at Riviera Country Club in Los Angeles:

Mr. Wilke joined Mr. Jenkins, Vic Damone, James Garner, Jack Ging, Glen Campbell, Donald O'Connor, and Lindsay Crosby in the first and only Sports Illustrated Open Invitation at Riviera. The pro at Riviera at the time, Mac Hunter, is quoted as saying, "Bob Wilke used to be head and shoulders better than any of the actors and personalities. And he's still very good. A solid four handicap, but his putting is deteriorating. Wilke must have won more celebrity tournaments than you can count.

Ging edged out Bob Wilke for the win that day. James Garner also said that Wilke was the best golfer among the showbiz crowd at the Riviera in his book The Garner Files.

In 1966, Wilke was rated the best amateur golfer in Hollywood. In 1960, 1963, and 1964, he won the World Entertainment Championship golf title.

== Private life ==
He married Laura Elizabeth Conroy in 1946, by whom he had one son. After their divorce, he remarried, to Patricia Kesinger in 1973. Wilke died of lung cancer.

== Selected filmography ==
- San Francisco (1936) as Earthquake Survivor (uncredited)
- King of the Texas Rangers (1936)
- That Man's Here Again (1937) as Extra in Park (uncredited)
- San Quentin (1937) as Young Convict in Yard (uncredited)
- S.O.S. Coast Guard (1937) as Seaman (uncredited)
- Renfrew of the Royal Mounted (1937) as Mountie at Picnic (uncredited)
- International Crime (1938) as Bar Patron (uncredited)
- The Fighting Devil Dogs (1938) as Marine in Shanghai (uncredited)
- Come On, Rangers (1938) (uncredited)
- Woman Doctor (1939) as Ambulance Driver (uncredited)
- Star Reporter (1939) as Reporter (uncredited)
- Street of Missing Men (1939) as Henchman (uncredited)
- Man of Conquest (1939) as Texican (uncredited)
- S.O.S. Tidal Wave (1939) as Man in TV Studio (uncredited)
- Daredevils of the Red Circle (1939) as G-Man (uncredited)
- In Old Monterey (1939) as Man on Wagon (uncredited)
- Jeepers Creepers (1939) as Gangster
- In Old Missouri (1940) as Hillbilly (uncredited)
- Grand Ole Opry (1940) as Hillbilly (uncredited)
- Adventures of Red Ryder (1940) as Henchman (uncredited)
- Hit Parade of 1941 (1940) (uncredited)
- Country Fair (1941)
- Power Dive (1941) as Barfly (uncredited)
- Sierra Sue (1941) as Carnival Spectator (uncredited)
- Dick Tracy vs. Crime Inc. (1941) as Cutter Helmsman (uncredited)
- Spy Smasher (1942, Serial) as Chief Government Agent [Chs. 1–2, 10-11] (uncredited)
- Bells of Capistrano (1942) as Roustabout (uncredited)
- The Masked Marvel (1943, Serial) as Rental Garage Thug (uncredited)
- Overland Mail Robbery (1943) as Shack Guard (uncredited)
- Pistol Packin' Mama (1943) as Bodyguard (uncredited)
- California Joe (1943) as Barfly (uncredited)
- The Fighting Seabees (1944) as Arriving Construction Worker (uncredited)
- Captain America (1944) as Thug with B-10 [Ch. 4] (uncredited)
- Beneath Western Skies (1944) as Henchman (uncredited)
- Hidden Valley Outlaws (1944) as Rancher (uncredited)
- Rosie the Riveter (1944) as Furniture Mover (uncredited)
- Cowboy and the Senorita (1944) as Townsman (uncredited)
- The Tiger Woman (1944) as Hill Heavy 1[Ch. 2] / Road Heavy (uncredited)
- The Yellow Rose of Texas (1944) as Deputy (uncredited)
- Marshal of Reno (1944) as Deputy (uncredited)
- Call of the Rockies (1944) as Deputy Jim (uncredited)
- Bordertown Trail (1944) as Henchman (uncredited)
- The San Antonio Kid (1944) as Henchman
- Haunted Harbor (1944) as 1st Bartender [Ch. 1] (uncredited)
- Stagecoach to Monterey (1944) as Barfly (uncredited)
- Cheyenne Wildcat (1944) as Deputy Charlie (uncredited)
- Code of the Prairie (1944) as Office Henchman (uncredited)
- Sheriff of Sundown (1944) as Bradley - Henchman
- Vigilantes of Dodge City (1944) as Henchman
- Zorro's Black Whip (1944) as Bill Slocum (uncredited)
- Faces in the Fog (1944) as Photographer (uncredited)
- Firebrands of Arizona (1944) as 3rd Deputy (uncredited)
- The Big Bonanza (1944) as Rancher (uncredited)
- Sheriff of Las Vegas (1944) as Barfly (uncredited)
- The Topeka Terror (1945) as Lynch-Mob Member
- Great Stagecoach Robbery (1945) as Stage Guard (uncredited)
- Sheriff of Cimarron (1945) as Dobie - Henchman
- Earl Carroll Vanities (1945) as Cab Driver (uncredited)
- Corpus Christi Bandits (1945) as Steve - Henchman
- Lone Texas Ranger (1945) as Henchman (uncredited)
- Santa Fe Saddlemates (1945) as Rawhide
- Bells of Rosarita (1945) as Deputy (uncredited)
- The Chicago Kid (1945) as Detective (uncredited)
- The Man from Oklahoma (1945) as Chauffeur (uncredited)
- Trail of Kit Carson (1945) as Dave MacRoy
- Hitchhike to Happiness (1945) as Stage Hand (uncredited)
- The Purple Monster Strikes (1945) as Dr. Harvey's Assistant (uncredited)
- Bandits of the Badlands (1945) as Keller - Henchman
- Sunset in El Dorado (1945) as Curley Roberts - Henchman
- Rough Riders of Cheyenne (1945) as Smoke - Henchman
- The Daltons Ride Again (1945) as Posseman (uncredited)
- The Phantom Rider (1946) as Indian Rebel 1 (uncredited)
- Roaring Rangers (1946) as Outlaw Leader (uncredited)
- The Catman of Paris (1946) as The Catman (uncredited)
- The Wife of Monte Cristo (1946) as Minor Role (uncredited)
- King of the Forest Rangers (1946, Serial) as Carleton - Forest Ranger [Chs. 1, 4–5, 9] (uncredited)
- Badman's Territory (1946) as Deputy Marshal (uncredited)
- Passkey to Danger (1946) as Police Sergeant (uncredited)
- Traffic in Crime (1946) as Hogan's Driver
- Rendezvous with Annie (1946) as MP (uncredited)
- Daughter of Don Q (1946) as Smith (uncredited)
- Inner Circle (1946) as Cummings - Police Officer
- White Tie and Tails (1946) as Starter (uncredited)
- The Crimson Ghost (1946, Serial) as Scott - Armored Car Driver [Ch. 3] (uncredited)
- Out California Way (1946) as Nate (uncredited)
- The Pilgrim Lady (1947) as Doorman (uncredited)
- The Michigan Kid (1947) as Pool Player (uncredited)
- The Ghost Goes Wild (1947) as Burglar
- West of Dodge City (1947) as Adams - Henchman (uncredited)
- Twilight on the Rio Grande (1947) as Henchman (uncredited)
- Buck Privates Come Home (1947) as GI Buddy (uncredited)
- Law of the Canyon (1947) as Knife-Throwing Henchman (uncredited)
- The Vigilantes Return (1947) as Henchman (uncredited)
- Web of Danger (1947) as Station Wagon Driver (uncredited)
- Blackmail (1947) as Policeman (uncredited)
- The Black Widow (1947) as Cabbie / Jailer (uncredited)
- Last Days of Boot Hill (1947) as Bronc Peters (uncredited)
- Frontier Outpost (1948)
- Six-Gun Law (1948) as Larson - Henchman (uncredited)
- G-Men Never Forget (1948, Serial) as Steele - Phony Detective [Ch. 5] (uncredited)
- The Wreck of the Hesperus (1948) as Milton (uncredited)
- West of Sonora (1948) as Brock - Henchman (uncredited)
- Dangers of the Canadian Mounted (1948) as Cpl. Baxter (uncredited)
- Carson City Raiders (1948) as Ed Noble
- River Lady (1948) as Man (uncredited)
- Daredevils of the Clouds (1948) as Joe
- A Southern Yankee (1948) as Confederate Soldier Ordering Cease Fire (uncredited)
- Trail to Laredo (1948) as Duke - Henchman (uncredited)
- Desperadoes of Dodge City (1948) as Land Agent Runner (uncredited)
- Sundown in Santa Fe (1948) as Henchman (uncredited)
- Homicide for Three (1948) as Policeman (uncredited)
- Federal Agents vs. Underworld, Inc. (1949, Serial) as Zod - Pursuit Plane Pilot [Chs. 10-11]
- Ghost of Zorro (1949) as Townsman (uncredited)
- Death Valley Gunfighter (1949) as Henchman (uncredited)
- Laramie (1949) as Cronin (uncredited)
- The Wyoming Bandit (1949) as Sam - Henchman
- Flaming Fury (1949) as Patrolman (uncredited)
- The James Brothers of Missouri (1949) as Townsman (uncredited)
- Post Office Investigator (1949) as Policeman (uncredited)
- The Traveling Saleswoman (1950) as Loser (uncredited)
- The Blonde Bandit (1950) as Det. Walker
- Mule Train (1950) as Bradshaw - Henchman (uncredited)
- The Kid from Texas (1950) as Henchman (uncredited)
- Twilight in the Sierras (1950) as Bus Driver (uncredited)
- Outcast of Black Mesa (1950) as Curt - Henchman
- Kill the Umpire (1950) as Cactus (uncredited)
- Beyond the Purple Hills (1950) as Jim Conners - Henchman (uncredited)
- The Desert Hawk (1950) as Camel Driver (uncredited)
- Across the Badlands (1950) as Duke Jackson / Keno Jackson
- Frontier Outpost (1950) as Krag Benson
- Vengeance Valley (1951) as Cowhand (uncredited)
- Saddle Legion (1951) as Hooker - Henchman
- GunPlay (1951) as Henchman Winslow
- No Questions Asked (1951) as Police Sergeant (uncredited)
- Best of the Badmen (1951) as Jim Younger
- Cyclone Fury (1951) as Bunco - Henchman
- Pistol Harvest (1951) as Andy Baylor
- Hot Lead (1951) as Stoney Dawson
- Overland Telegraph (1951) as Bellew - Henchman
- Indian Uprising (1952) as Taggart Man (uncredited)
- The Las Vegas Story (1952) as Clayton
- Road Agent (1952) as Slab Babcock
- Laramie Mountains (1952) as Henry Mandel (uncredited)
- Carbine Williams (1952) as Guard on Train (uncredited)
- High Noon (1952) as Jim Pierce
- Hellgate (1952) as Sgt. Maj. Kearn
- Cattle Town (1952) as Keeno
- Fargo (1952) as Link - Henchman
- Wyoming Roundup (1952) as Wyatt - Henchman
- The Maverick (1952) as Massey
- Cow Country (1953) as Sledge
- Powder River (1953) as Will Horn
- Arrowhead (1953) as Sgt. Stone
- From Here to Eternity (1953) as Sgt. Henderson (uncredited)
- War Paint (1953) as Trooper Grady
- The Lone Gun (1954) as Hort Moran
- Two Guns and a Badge (1954) as Moore - Outlaw
- 20,000 Leagues Under the Sea (1954) as First Mate of the Nautilus
- Death Valley Days (1955, Two Gun Nan)
- The Far Country (1955) as Madden
- Smoke Signal (1955) as 1st Sgt. Daly
- Strange Lady in Town (1955) as Karg
- Shotgun (1955) as Bentley
- Son of Sinbad (1955) as Musa (uncredited)
- Wichita (1955) as Ben Thompson
- Tarantula (1955) as Ranch Hand (uncredited)
- The Lone Ranger (1956) as Cassidy
- Backlash (1956) as Jeff Welker
- Raw Edge (1956) as Sile Doty
- The Rawhide Years (1956) as Neal
- Canyon River (1956) as Joe Graycoe
- The Vagabond King (1956) as Officer of the Day (uncredited)
- Gun the Man Down (1956) as Matt Rankin
- Cheyenne (1956) 'Mustang Trail' as Jed Begert
- Written on the Wind (1956) as Dan Willis
- Hot Summer Night (1957) as Tom Ellis
- Night Passage (1957) as Concho
- The Tarnished Angels (1957) as Hank
- Return to Warbow (1958) as Red
- Colgate Theatre (1958) S1 E2 "The Last Marshal"
- Man of the West (1958) as Ponch
- Gunsmoke (1958) as Hickock
- Never Steal Anything Small (1959) as Lennie
- Wanted: Dead or Alive (1959) S2 E13 "No Trail Back" as Ben Hooker
- Gunsmoke (1959) as Pegger
- Spartacus (1960) as Guard Captain
- The Magnificent Seven (1960) as Wallace
- Gunsmoke (1960) as Tom Burr
- Gunsmoke (1960) as Pitt Gillin
- Blueprint for Robbery (1961) as Capt. Swanson
- The Long Rope (1961) as Ben Matthews
- Rawhide (1961) – Sheriff McVey in S3:E25, "Incident of the Running Man"
- Death Valley Days (1962) 'Susie' as Sergeant Brill
- Gunsmoke (1962) as Ab Rankin
- Have Gun - Will Travel (1963) as Will Tybee
- The Gun Hawk (1963) as Johnny Flanders
- Shock Treatment (1964) as Technician Mike Newton
- Fate Is the Hunter (1964) as Stillman
- Gunsmoke (1964) as Kelby
- Death Valley Days (1965) 'The Journey' as Sergeant Wilks
- The Hallelujah Trail (1965) as Chief Five Barrels
- Daniel Boone (1965) as Toff - S1/E18 "The Sound of Fear"
- Morituri (1965) as Cmdr. Kelling (uncredited)
- Smoky (1966) as Jeff Nicks
- Gunsmoke (1967) as Luke Cumberledge
- Tony Rome (1967) as Ralph Turpin
- The Cheyenne Social Club (1970) as Corey Bannister
- A Gunfight (1971) as Marshal Tom Cater
- The Resurrection of Zachary Wheeler (1971) as Hugh Fielding
- The Boy Who Cried Werewolf (1973) as The Sheriff
- Santee (1973) as Deaks
- Days of Heaven (1978) as The Farm Foreman
- The Sweet Creek County War (1979) as Lucas Derring
- The Great Monkey Rip-Off (1979) as Zaerbo
- Dallas (1980) 'The Dove Hunt' as Tom Owens
- Stripes (1981) as Gen. Barnicke (final film role)
