= Vigilantes of Dodge City =

1944 film

- Directed by: Wallace Grissell / Yakima Canutt
- Written by: Norman S. Hall and Anthony Coldeway, (screenplay) ; Norman S. Hall, (original story); Fred Harman (based characters created in the comic strip)
- Produced by: Stephen Auer
- Starring: Wild Bill Elliott
- Cinematography: William Bradford
- Edited by: Charles Craft
- Music by: Joseph Dubin
- Distributed by: Republic Pictures
- Release date: 1944
- Running time: 64 minutes (original run time)
- Country: United States
- Language: English

Vigilantes of Dodge City is a 1944 American Western film directed by Howard Bretherton and starring Wild Bill Elliott in the role of Red Ryder and costarring as Little Beaver, actor (Bobby) Robert Blake. It was the fifth of twenty-three Red Ryder feature films that would be produced by Republic Pictures. The picture was shot on the studio’s back lot along with outdoor locations at Iverson Ranch, 1 Iverson Lane, Chatsworth, Los Angeles, CA, USA.

== Plot ==
Luther Jennings (LeRoy Mason) seeks to take over the Ryder freight lines run by Red Ryder’s Aunt, the Duchess (Alice Fleming). His gang robs their stages and rustles the horses that Red Ryder (Wild Bill Elliott) is delivering to the Army in order to put them out of business. Jennings tries to buy the Ryder Stage Lines but the Duchess refuses to sell because of Jennings' low offer. When the Army Captain arrives, he arrests Ryder for rustling, believing that Ryder has stolen his own horses to defraud the Army. However, when they are stopped on the way to the fort, Jennings’ hired gunman, Benteen (Bud Geary) tries to kill Glover and make Red look responsible. When Red saves the officer, Glover realizes that Red is innocent.

Captain Glover convinces his commanding officer, General Wingate "(Stanley Andrews)", to let him return with Red to Dodge City, where they hope to uncover the real culprits. Meanwhile, Little Beaver "(Robert Blake (actor))", is determined to help Red and nurses a colt that is the last remaining member of the missing herd, back to health. Little Beaver then frees his horse, “Little Papoose,” and follows the colt as he goes through the gang's secret cave to a valley where the other horses are being held. While he is in the cave, Little Beaver overhears the gang's plan to commit another robbery and frame Red for it.

Little Beaver tells Red about his discovery and accompanies the cowboy to the hidden outlaw cave. At the hideout, Red and Captain Glover find evidence proving Red's innocence and incriminating Jennings. There, Red fights with Dave Brewster "(Kenne Duncan)", a Benteen henchman, and forces him to confess his crimes and reveal Jennings’ and Bishop's roles in the conspiracy. Red takes Brewster back to town, where Glover confronts Jennings and Bishop, who take Little Beaver hostage during an escape attempt. Red rescues his Indian ward, and both villains are killed as the wagon they are escaping in, careens off a cliff. Afterwards, Red and the Duchess are awarded another contract by the cavalry.

== Cast ==
- Wild Bill Elliott as Red Ryder
- Robert Blake as Little Beaver
- Martha Wentworth as The Duchess (Red's Aunt)
- Linda Stirling as Carol Franklin
- LeRoy Mason as Luther Jennings
- Hal Taliaferro as Walter Bishop
- Tom London as Denver
- Steve Barclay as Captain James Glover
- Bud Geary as Benteen
- Kenne Duncan as Dave Brewster
- Robert J. Wilke as Bill (as Bob Wilke)
- Stanley Andrews as General Wingate (uncredited)
- Roy Bucko] as Hideout Guard (uncredited)
- Horace B. Carpenter as Jeff Moore (uncredited)
- Herman Hack as Cave Henchman (uncredited)
- Post Park as Wagon Driver Jim Evans (uncredited)
- Cliff Parkinson as Wagon Loader (uncredited)
- Dale Van Sickel as Henchman (uncredited)

== Production ==
Vigilantes of Dodge City was based on the characters created in Fred Harman’s comic strip, Red Ryder. The picture was shot on the studio’s back lot along with outdoor locations at Iverson Ranch, 1 Iverson Lane, Chatsworth, Los Angeles, CA, USA. Vigilantes of Dodge City premiered in Los Angeles on October 26, 1944, and then opened November 15, 1944. The film was later re-released on February 7, 1949.

=== Stunts ===
- Bud Geary
- Post Park
- Cliff Parkinson
- Tom Steele
- Dale Van Sickel
