= Tom London =

American actor (1889–1963)

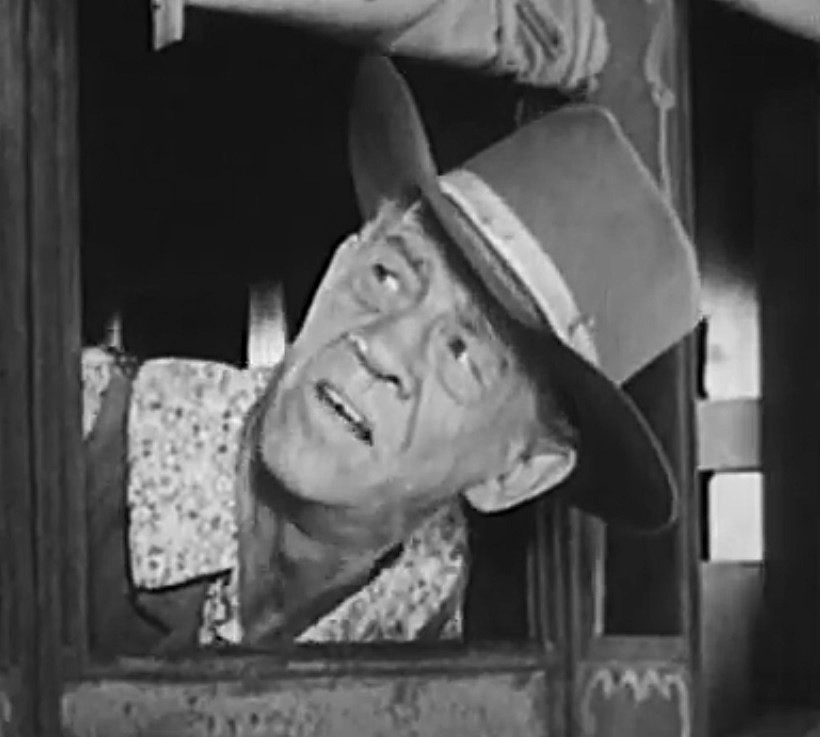
- London in The Adventures of Kit Carson (1951)
- Born: Leonard T. Clapman; August 24, 1889; Louisville, Kentucky, U.S.
- Died: December 5, 1963 (aged 74); North Hollywood, California, U.S.
- Resting place: Forest Lawn Memorial Park Cemetery, Glendale, California
- Occupation: Actor
- Years active: 1915–1962
- Spouse(s): Edith Stayart (m. 19??; div. 19??); Frances McClellan (m. 1934; div. 19??) Louvie Munal (m. 1952)

Tom London (born Leonard Thomas Clapham; August 24, 1889 – December 5, 1963) was an American actor who played frequently in B-Westerns. According to The Guinness Book of Movie Records, London is credited with appearing in the most films in the history of Hollywood. The 2001 book Film Facts likewise says that the performer who played in the most films was "Tom London, who made his first of over 2,000 appearances in The Great Train Robbery, 1903". He used his birth name in films until 1924.

== Life and career ==
Born in Louisville, Kentucky, London got his start in movies as a props man in Chicago, Illinois. His debut was in 1915 in the Western Lone Larry, performing under his own name. The first film in which he was billed under his new name was Winds of Chance, a World War I film, in which he played "Sgt. Rock". London was a trick rider and roper, and used his trick skills in scores of Westerns. In the silent-film era, he often played villainous roles, while in later years, he often appeared as the sidekick to Western stars such as Sunset Carson in several films.

One of the busiest character actors, he appeared in over 600 films. London made many guest appearances in television shows through the 1950s, such as The Range Rider, with Jock Mahoney and Dick Jones. He also played Sam, the attendant of Helen Ramirez's (Katy Jurado) in High Noon. His last movie was Underworld U.S.A. in 1961, and his final roles on TV were in Lawman and The Dakotas.

== Personal life ==
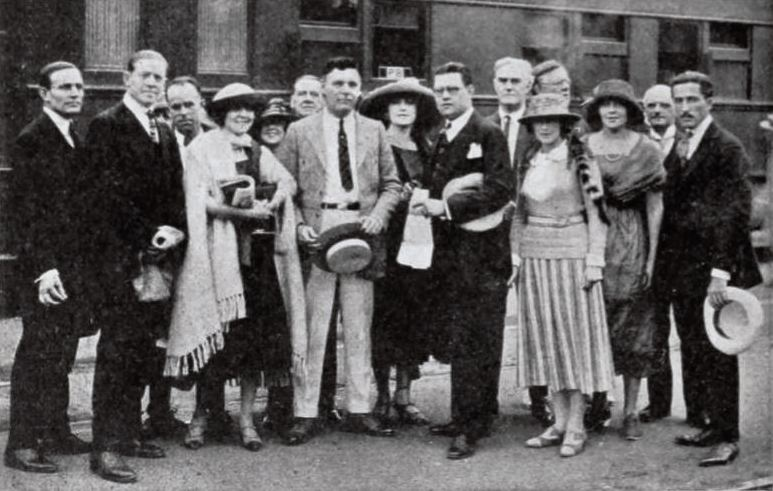
Cast photo from Nan of the North including Tom London (second from left) and Edith Stayart

London married actress Edith Stayart (1890 – August 7, 1970), born Edythe B. Stayart, who has several roles in films in the 1920s including Nan of the North. On July 5, 1952, he married Louvie Munal in Del Rio, Texas.

== Death ==
London died at his home in North Hollywood at age 74.

== Selected filmography ==
1900s

- The Great Train Robbery (1903, Short)

1910s

- Liberty (1916)
- The Purple Mask (1916) - Robert Jackson, Inventor
- The Lion's Claws (1918) - Reglis
- The Heart of Humanity (1918) - Minor Role
- Leave It to Susan (1918) - Minor Role
- The Lone Star Ranger (1919) - Minor Role
- The Last of the Duanes (1919)
- The Great Air Robbery (1919) - Minor Role
- The Heart of Humanity (1918)
- The Lion Man (1919) - Lacey
- The Heart of Texas (1919)

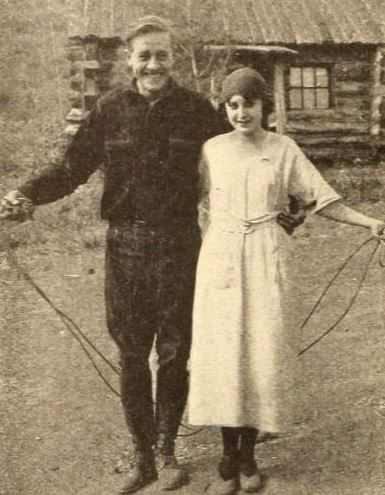
London and Virginia Brown Faire in Exhibitors Herald, 1920

1920s

- His Nose in the Book (1920, Short)
- Her Five-Foot Highness (1920) - Slim Higgins
- Wolf Tracks (1920, Short)
- Masked (1920, Short)
- Under Northern Lights (1920) - Jacques Foucharde
- 'In Wrong' Wright (1920, Short)
- King of the Circus (1920, Short)
- Colorado (1921) - David Collins
- Ghost City (1921) - Bob Clark
- Nan of the North (1922) - Dick Driscoll
- The Long Chance (1922) - John Corbaly
- The Cowboy and the Lady (1922) - Joe
- The Social Buccaneer (1923) - Louis Lenoir
- To the Last Man (1923) - Guy
- Our Hospitality (1923) - James Canfield (uncredited)
- The Call of the Canyon (1923) - Lee Stanton
- Mile-a-Minute Morgan (1924) - Kenneth Winster
- Heritage of the Desert (1924) - Dave Naab
- The Right of the Strongest (1924) - Fred Dearing
- The Perfect Alibi (1924) - Ollie Summers
- Not Built for Runnin' (1924) - Lem Dodge
- The Loser's End (1924) - Barney Morris
- The Air Hawk (1924) - Kellar
- Not Guilty for Runnin' (1924) - Lem Dodge
- Headin' Through (1924) - Roy Harlan
- The Trouble Buster (1925) - Larry Simons
- The Shield of Silence (1925) - Harry Ramsey
- The Blood Bond (1925)
- Border Vengeance (1925) - Flash Denby
- Winds of Chance (1925) - RCMP Sgt. Rock
- Three in Exile (1925) - Jed Hawkings
- Win, Lose or Draw (1925) - Fred Holt
- Ranchers and Rascals (1925) - Larry Simmons
- Silent Sheldon (1925) - Bill Fadden
- Luck and Sand (1925) - Sanger
- The Demon Rider (1925) - Black Hawk
- The Cowboy Musketeer (1925) - Joe Dokes
- Clicking Hoofs (1926)
- The Bar-C Mystery (1926)
- Chasing Trouble (1926) - Jerome Garrett
- Dangerous Traffic (1926) - Marc Brandon
- Snowed In (1926, Serial) - U.S. Marshal Thayer
- Code of the Northwest (1926) - Pvt. Frank Stafford
- West of the Rainbow's End (1926) - Harry Palmer
- Desert Greed (1926) - Ranger (uncredited)
- The Grey Devil (1926)
- The Long Loop on the Pecos (1927) - Laird
- The Golden Stallion (1927) - Jules La Roux
- The Return of the Riddle Rider (1927) - Buck White
- The King of Kings (1927) - Roman Soldier (uncredited)
- The Little Boss (1927)
- Border Blackbirds (1927)
- The Devil's Twin (1927) - Otis Dilbre
- The Boss of Rustler's Roost (1928) - 'Pronto Giles', the Foreman
- The Apache Raider (1928) - Griffin Dawson
- The Bronc Stomper (1928) - Alan Riggs
- Put 'Em Up (1928) - Jake Lannister
- The Yellow Cameo (1928) - Spraker
- The Michigan Kid (1928) - Minor Role (uncredited)
- Yellow Contraband (1928) - Drag Conners
- The Price of Fear (1928) - 'Flash' Hardy
- The Mystery Rider (1928) - David Manning / The Claw
- In Old Arizona (1928) - Man in Saloon (uncredited)
- Untamed Justice (1929) - Henchman Jim
- The Lawless Legion (1929) - Henchman (uncredited)
- The Harvest of Hate (1929) - Martin Trask
- Chinatown Nights (1929) - Cop (uncredited)
- The Border Wildcat (1929) - Joe Kern
- The Black Watch (1929) - 42nd Highlander (uncredited)
- Queen of the Northwoods (1929) - Garvin / The Wolf-Devil
- No More Children (1929) - Detective
- Hell's Heroes (1929) - Croupier (uncredited)
- New York Nights (1929) - Cop (uncredited)

1930s

- The Woman Racket (1930) - Hennessy
- Firebrand Jordan (1930) - Ed Burns
- Bar-L Ranch (1930) - Henchman (uncredited)
- Troopers Three (1930) - Sgt. Hank Darby
- All Quiet on the Western Front (1930) - 1st Medic Orderly (uncredited)
- Safety in Numbers (1930) - Motorist (uncredited)
- Romance of the West (1930) - 'Kayo' Mooney
- The Storm (1930) - Head Mountie
- Borrowed Wives (1930) - Mac - Motorcycle Cop (uncredited)
- River's End (1930) - Mountie (uncredited)
- Under Texas Skies (1930) - Fake Captain Hartford
- The Third Alarm (1930) - Fireman Tom
- See America Thirst (1930) - Spumoni Hood (uncredited)
- Westward Bound (1930) - Dick - Rustler
- The Spell of the Circus (1931) - Butte Morgan
- Sheer Luck (1931) - Police Lieutenant
- Trails of the Golden West (1931)
- Dishonored (1931) - Minor Role (uncredited)
- Air Police (1931) - Spike - Joe's Henchman
- Gun Smoke (1931) - Hank Bailey (uncredited)
- Quick Millions (1931) - Atlas Newsreel Man (uncredited)
- The Secret Six (1931) - Blackjacking Gangster (uncredited)
- The Two Gun Man (1931) - Lem Tolliver
- East of Borneo (1931)
- Lightnin' Smith Returns (1931) - Lightning' Smith
- The Galloping Ghost (1931, Serial) - Mullins - Henchman
- Arizona Terror (1931) - Chuckawalla - Henchman
- Range Law (1931) - Henchman Cleve
- Lasca of the Rio Grande (1931) - (uncredited)
- Platinum Blonde (1931) - Reporter (uncredited)
- Men in Her Life (1931) - Court Bailiff (uncredited)
- West of Broadway (1931) - Cowhand (uncredited)
- The Sea Ghost (1931) - Barroom Sailor (uncredited)
- Valley of Badmen (1931) - Horton
- Dr. Jekyll and Mr. Hyde (1931) - Minor Role (uncredited)
- Without Honors (1932) - 'Sholt' Fletcher
- One Man Law (1932) - Syndicate Land Buyer (uncredited)
- Cock of the Air (1932) - Military Policeman (uncredited)
- The Beast of the City (1932) - First Policeman Killed in Final Raid (uncredited)
- Shopworn (1932) - 'Pa' Lane (uncredited)
- Outlaw Justice (1932) - Henchman Hank
- The Boiling Point (1932) - Pete Mallis
- The Silver Lining (1932) - Central Park Mugger (uncredited)
- The Trial of Vivienne Ware (1932) - Cop at Door (uncredited)
- Ghost Valley (1932) - Henchman Red (uncredited)
- Honor of the Mounted (1932) - Henchman (uncredited)
- Beyond the Rockies (1932) - Henchman Kirk Tracy
- The Thirteenth Guest (1932) - Detective Carter (uncredited)
- The Lost Special (1932, Serial) - Jim Dirk / Detective Dane
- Laughter in Hell (1933) - Guard (uncredited)
- The Iron Master (1933) - Turner
- Clancy of the Mounted (1933, Serial) - Corporal McGregor
- The Thundering Herd (1933) - Henchman (uncredited)
- King of the Jungle (1933) - Lion Attendant (uncredited)
- Gabriel Over the White House (1933) - Secret Service Man (uncredited)
- The Whispering Shadow (1933, Serial) - Dupont - Henchman #5 [Chs. 1–8,12] (uncredited)
- Justice Takes a Holiday (1933) - Convict (uncredited)
- The Big Cage (1933) - Ship Captain (uncredited)
- Made on Broadway (1933) - Plainclothesman (uncredited)
- The Phantom of the Air (1933, Serial) - Jim - Radio Man (uncredited)
- The Nuisance (1933) - Kelley's Associate (uncredited)
- Sunset Pass (1933) - Ben
- The Man from Monterey (1933) - Lt. Adams (uncredited)
- The Fugitive (1933) - Tom - Foreman
- Gordon of Ghost City (1933, Serial) - Pat Campbell (Ch's. 6 & 7) (uncredited)
- One Year Later (1933) - Taxicab Driver (uncredited)
- Man of the Forest (1933) - Ranch Hand (uncredited)
- Lady for a Day (1933) - Reception Guest (uncredited)
- Brief Moment (1933) - Thug (uncredited)
- Police Car 17 (1933) - Detective (uncredited)
- The Wolf Dog (1933, Serial) - Brooks
- I'm No Angel (1933) - Sideshow Spectator (uncredited)
- Broadway Thru a Keyhole (1933) - Member of Rocci's Mob (uncredited)
- The Perils of Pauline (1933, Serial) - Soldier at American Consulate (uncredited)
- Lone Cowboy (1933) - Conductor (uncredited)
- Smoky (1933) - Horse Trader (uncredited)
- Beggars in Ermine (1934) - Steel Worker (uncredited)
- The Crime Doctor (1934) - Detective at Airport Arrest (uncredited)
- The Countess of Monte Cristo (1934) - Police Detective (uncredited)
- I Believed in You (1934) - Policeman (uncredited)
- Mystery Ranch (1934) - Blake
- St. Louis Woman (1934) - Lions Coach Ryan
- The Vanishing Shadow (1934, Serial) - Policeman [Chs. 1, 4] (uncredited)
- Ferocious Pal (1934) - Dave Brownell
- Twisted Rails (1934) - Sheriff James
- Monte Carlo Nights (1934) - Blondie's Brother (uncredited)
- Hollywood Party (1934) - Paul Revere (uncredited)
- Rawhide Mail (1934) - Al - Barfly (uncredited)
- Such Women Are Dangerous (1934) - Bailiff (uncredited)
- Burn 'Em Up Barnes (1934, Serial) - Parsons - Oil Speculator [Chs. 10-12] (uncredited)
- Baby, Take a Bow (1934) - Man on Train (uncredited)
- Fighting Hero (1934) - Sheriff
- Bachelor Bait (1934) - Detective (uncredited)
- The Cat's-Paw (1934) - Murph - Cop (uncredited)
- The Captain Hates the Sea (1934) - Minor Role (uncredited)
- The Oil Raider (1934) - Oil Well Driller (uncredited)
- Outlaw's Highway (1934) - Chet
- The Prescott Kid (1934) - Henchman Slim (uncredited)
- Men of the Night (1934) - Dave Burns (uncredited)
- Jealousy (1934) - Minor Role (uncredited)
- Mystery Mountain (1934, Serial) - Morgan - Rattler Henchman
- Mills of the Gods (1934) - Workman (uncredited)
- When Lightning Strikes (1934) - Wolf
- The Cactus Kid (1935) - Sheriff
- Law Beyond the Range (1935) - Jerry Grant (uncredited)
- The Whole Town's Talking (1935) - Guard (uncredited)
- The Revenge Rider (1935) - Deputy Peters (uncredited)
- Million Dollar Haul (1935) - Henchman Joe
- The Miracle Rider (1935, Serial) - Sewell - Henchman
- The Tia Juana Kid (1935) - Gang Leader
- Goin' to Town (1935) - Cowboy (uncredited)
- $10 Raise (1935) - Warehouse Foreman (uncredited)
- Toll of the Desert (1935) - Sheriff Jackson
- The Test (1935) - Trapper (uncredited)
- Let 'Em Have It (1935) - Penitentiary Guard (uncredited)
- Justice of the Range (1935) - Barfly (uncredited)
- The Roaring West (1935, Serial) - Henchman Butch
- Rio Rattler (1935) - Ranger Bob Adams
- Trails End (1935) - Randall's Henchman
- Tumbling Tumbleweeds (1935) - Henchman Sykes (uncredited)
- Red Salute (1935) - Navy Officer (uncredited)
- Cappy Ricks Returns (1935) - Sailor (uncredited)
- Courage of the North (1935) - Mordant
- Timber Terrors (1935) - Burke
- This Is the Life (1935) - Highway Patrol Officer (uncredited)
- Barbary Coast (1935) - Ringsider with Bar Girl (uncredited)
- Way Down East (1935) - Town Choir Singer (uncredited)
- Grand Exit (1935) - Policeman (uncredited)
- Hong Kong Nights (1935) - Blake
- The Sagebrush Troubadour (1935) - Sheriff (uncredited)
- The Last of the Clintons (1935) - Luke Todd
- The Fighting Marines (1935, Serial) - Miller - Henchman M-90
- Gallant Defender (1935) - Smiley, Wounded Henchman (uncredited)
- Gun Play (1935) - Meeker
- Skull and Crown (1935) - Jennings - Henchman
- Just My Luck (1935) - Plant Manager
- Five Bad Men (1935)
- The Mysterious Avenger (1936) - Henchman (uncredited)
- The Lawless Nineties (1936) - Ward - Henchman
- Wildcat Saunders (1936) - Pete Hawkins
- Call of the Prairie (1936) - Dealer (uncredited)
- O'Malley of the Mounted (1936) - Lefty - Henchman
- Heroes of the Range (1936) - Bud
- The Clutching Hand (1936, Serial) - Nellie D Sailor [Chs. 1,11-14] (uncredited)
- Avenging Waters (1936) - Henchman Huffy (uncredited)
- Pinto Rustlers (1936) - Rustler (uncredited)
- The Border Patrolman (1936) - Johnson
- Guns and Guitars (1936) - Henchman Connor
- The Crime of Dr. Forbes (1936) - Iron Worker (uncredited)
- The Phantom Rider (1936, Serial) - Henchman Tom (Ch's 12–14) (uncredited)
- The Bride Walks Out (1936) - Ship's Officer (uncredited)
- Pepper (1936) - Guard (uncredited)
- Sworn Enemy (1936) - Gangster (uncredited)
- Bulldog Edition (1936) - Henchman (uncredited)
- Ramona (1936) - American Settler (uncredited)
- Sworn Enemy (1936) - Henchman Sneed
- Career Woman (1936) - Bailiff—Clarkdale (uncredited)
- Secret Valley (1937) - 2nd Taxi Driver (uncredited)
- Santa Fe Rides (1937) - Sheriff (uncredited)
- The Silver Trail (1937) - Looney
- I Promise to Pay (1937) - Arresting Detective (uncredited)
- Bar-Z Bad Men (1937) - Sig Bostell
- The Frame-Up (1937) - Fred (uncredited)
- Law of the Ranger (1937) - Henchman Pete
- Venus Makes Trouble (1937) - Stanton Crony (uncredited)
- This Is My Affair (1937) - Lil's Flustered Spectator (uncredited)
- Angel's Holiday (1937) - Truck Driver (uncredited)
- Roaring Timber (1937) - Henchman 'Duke'
- Three Legionnaires (1937) - Joe- Motorcycle Military Policeman (uncredited)
- Outlaws of the Orient (1937) - Red (uncredited)
- Western Gold (1937) - Clem
- Jungle Menace (1937, Serial) - Detective Interrogating Pete (uncredited)
- Sky Racket (1937) - Detective in Chase Car (uncredited)
- Radio Patrol (1937, Serial) - Eddie Lewis (uncredited)
- The Old Wyoming Trail (1937) - Townsman (uncredited)
- Springtime in the Rockies (1937) - Tracy
- Blossoms on Broadway (1937) - Cop (uncredited)
- Zorro Rides Again (1937, Serial) - O'Shea [Ch. 1]
- Courage of the West (1937) - Gold Guard (uncredited)
- The Mysterious Pilot (1937, Serial) - Kilgour - Henchman [Chs.1,3-4,6-9]
- The Lone Ranger (1938, Serial) - Felton - Henchman
- The Painted Trail (1938) - Towers (uncredited)
- Outlaws of Sonora (1938) - Sheriff Trask
- Flight Into Nowhere (1938) - Mechanic (uncredited)
- Six Shootin' Sheriff (1938) - Bar X Foreman
- Phantom Ranger (1938) - Reynolds
- The Fighting Devil Dogs (1938, Serial) - Henchman Wilson [Chs. 2–5, 9]
- Riders of the Black Hills (1938) - Henchman Red Stevens
- Stagecoach Days (1938) - Sheriff (uncredited)
- Squadron of Honor (1938) - Legionnaire (uncredited)
- The Great Adventures of Wild Bill Hickok (1938, Serial) - Henchman Kilgore (Ch.2) (uncredited)
- Pioneer Trail (1938) - Sam Harden
- Little Tough Guy (1938) - Detective Driving Car (uncredited)
- Smashing the Rackets (1938) - Dixon - Detective (uncredited)
- Sunset Trail (1938) - Jake, Trail Patrol Captain (uncredited)
- The Colorado Trail (1938) - Townsman (uncredited)
- Juvenile Court (1938) - Policeman at Accident (uncredited)
- The Renegade Ranger (1938) - Red
- Black Bandit (1938) - Tom - Cowhand (uncredited)
- Prairie Moon (1938) - Henchman Steve
- The Spider's Web (1938, Serial) - Cop in Bank (uncredited)
- Guilty Trails (1938) - Greasy - Rustler (uncredited)
- In Early Arizona (1938) - Fred - Town Councilman (uncredited)
- Rhythm of the Saddle (1938) - Red Malone (uncredited)
- Santa Fe Stampede (1938) - Marshal Jim Wood
- Song of the Buckaroo (1938) - Sheriff Wade
- California Frontier (1938) - Sheriff Tom Watkins (uncredited)
- Jesse James (1939) - Soldier (uncredited)
- Made for Each Other (1939) - Ranger (uncredited)
- Rollin' Westward (1939) - Sheriff
- Lure of the Wasteland (1939) - Carlton Foreman
- Southward Ho (1939) - Union Sergeant
- Trouble in Sundown (1939) - Doctor (uncredited)
- Mexicali Rose (1939) - Alcade's Aide (uncredited)
- Let Us Live (1939) - Police Sergeant (uncredited)
- North of the Yukon (1939) - Carter
- The Night Riders (1939) - Rancher Wilson
- Man from Texas (1939) - Henchman Slim
- The Rookie Cop (1939) - Detective Ryan (uncredited)
- Mandrake the Magician (1939, Serial) - Mill River Inn Henchman (uncredited)
- Mountain Rhythm (1939) - Deputy Tom
- Timber Stampede (1939) - Cattle Thief (uncredited)
- The Oregon Trail (1939, Serial) - Pete Cave Henchman [Ch. 12] (uncredited)
- Frontier Marshal (1939) - (scenes deleted)
- Fangs of the Wild (1939) - Larry Dean
- Konga, the Wild Stallion (1939) - Cowhand (uncredited)
- Full Confession (1939) - Prison Guard (uncredited)
- Flaming Lead (1939) - Bart Daggett
- Allegheny Uprising (1939) - Settler at McDowell's Mill (uncredited)
- Westbound Stage (1939) - Parker - Henchman

1940s

- The Shadow (1940, Serial) - Hijacked Truck Driver (uncredited)
- Five Little Peppers at Home (1940) - Miner (uncredited)
- Northwest Passage (1940) - Ranger (uncredited)
- Phantom Rancher (1940) - Sheriff Parker
- Viva Cisco Kid (1940) - Town Marshal (uncredited)
- Ghost Valley Raiders (1940) - Sheriff
- Dark Command (1940) - Messenger (uncredited)
- Shooting High (1940) - Eph Carson
- Covered Wagon Days (1940) - Martin
- Gaucho Serenade (1940) - Sheriff Tom Olson (uncredited)
- Lillian Russell (1940) - Frank (uncredited)
- The Kid from Santa Fe (1940) - Bill Stewart
- Prairie Law (1940) - Nester (uncredited)
- Wild Horse Range (1940) - Arnold
- Winners of the West (1940, Serial) - Henchman Webb [Ch. 13] (uncredited)
- Deadwood Dick (1940, Serial) - Jake (uncredited)
- When the Daltons Rode (1940) - Lyncher (uncredited)
- Stage to Chino (1940) - Dolan - Henchman
- The Ranger and the Lady (1940) - Independent Freight Wagon Driver (uncredited)
- Roll Wagons Roll (1940) - Henchman Matt Grimes
- Brigham Young (1940) - Raider (uncredited)
- Boom Town (1940) - Sheriff Harris (uncredited)
- Junior G-Men (1940, Serial) - Kearney - Riot Squad Cop [Ch. 1] (uncredited)
- Wagon Train (1940) - Charlie (uncredited)
- The Gay Caballero (1940) - Man at Fiesta (uncredited)
- Trailing Double Trouble (1940) - Henchman Kirk
- Youth Will Be Served (1940) - Engineer (uncredited)
- Melody Ranch (1940) - Joe #2 - Henchman (uncredited)
- Lone Star Raiders (1940) - Ranch Hand
- Romance of the Rio Grande (1940) - U. S. Marshal
- The Green Hornet Strikes Again! (1940, Serial) - Thug with Explosives (uncredited)
- San Francisco Docks (1940) - Longshoreman (uncredited)
- Riders from Nowhere (1940) - Mason
- Ridin' on a Rainbow (1941) - Rancher Harris (uncredited)
- Western Union (1941) - Slade Henchman #3 (uncredited)
- Across the Sierras (1941) - Man on Wagon (uncredited)
- The Lone Wolf Takes a Chance (1941) - Cop Getting Crane (uncredited)
- Pals of the Pecos (1941) - Sheriff Jeff
- Robbers of the Range (1941) - Henchman Monk Saunders
- The Spider Returns (1941, Serial) - Detective [Ch. 13] (uncredited)
- The Cowboy and the Blonde (1941) - Horse Stable Groom (uncredited)
- Adventure in Washington (1941) - Guard (uncredited)
- Billy the Kid (1941) - Leader (uncredited)
- Men of the Timberland (1941) - Lumberjack (uncredited)
- Broadway Limited (1941) - Engineer (uncredited)
- Two in a Taxi (1941) - Police Officer (uncredited)
- The Son of Davy Crockett (1941) - Logan - Ranger (uncredited)
- Wanderers of the West (1941) - Montana Sheriff
- The Parson of Panamint (1941) - Mining Forman (uncredited)
- Fugitive Valley (1941) - Marshal Warren
- The Lone Rider in Frontier Fury (1941) - Curley
- Dynamite Canyon (1941) - Captain Gray
- Wild Geese Calling (1941) - Minor Role (uncredited)
- Bad Man of Deadwood (1941) - Townsman (uncredited)
- Stick to Your Guns (1941) - Waffles - Bar 20 Cowhand
- Last of the Duanes (1941) - Bland Henchman (uncredited)
- Twilight on the Trail (1941) - Henchman Gregg
- Riding the Sunset Trail (1941) - Sheriff Hays
- Underground Rustlers (1941) - Henchman Tom Harris
- Dude Cowboy (1941) - Silver City Sheriff
- Forbidden Trails (1941) - Marshal Tom (uncredited)
- Arizona Terrors (1942) - Rancher Wade
- West of Tombstone (1942) - Morris
- Cowboy Serenade (1942) - Checker (uncredited)
- Valley of the Sun (1942) - Trooper Parker (uncredited)
- Riding the Wind (1942) - Silent Townsman (uncredited)
- Lone Star Ranger (1942) - Henchman (uncredited)
- Ghost Town Law (1942) - Ace
- Spy Smasher (1942, Serial) - Crane
- Land of the Open Range (1942) - Henchman Tracy Briggs
- Down Texas Way (1942) - Pete
- Stardust on the Sage (1942) - MacGowan
- Perils of the Royal Mounted (1942) - Gaynor - Trapper / Townsman
- Tombstone, the Town Too Tough to Die (1942) - Jailer (uncredited)
- Sons of the Pioneers (1942) - Joe #1 - Henchman (uncredited)
- Riders of the West (1942) - Slim - Lanky Henchman (uncredited)
- Shadows on the Sage (1942) - Franklin
- The Secret Code (1942, Serial) - Weather Bureau Guard (uncredited)
- Bandit Ranger (1942) - Cattle Rustler (uncredited)
- The Omaha Trail (1942) - Oxen Train Bullwhacker (uncredited)
- West of the Law (1942) - Charlie the Bartender (uncredited)
- War Dogs (1942) - Hinkel - Fifth columnist (uncredited)
- Junior Army (1942) - State Trooper (uncredited)
- Red River Robin Hood (1942) - Sheriff Del Auston
- The Ox-Bow Incident (1942) - Deputy (uncredited)
- American Empire (1942) - Rider with Crowder's Posse (uncredited)
- The Valley of Vanishing Men (1942, Serial) - Slater - Henchman
- Ridin' Down the Canyon (1942) - Henchman (uncredited)
- Fighting Frontier (1943) - Henchman Snap
- Tenting Tonight on the Old Camp Ground (1943) - Henchman Pete
- No Place for a Lady (1943) - Air Raid Warden (uncredited)
- Carson City Cyclone (1943) - 1st Sheriff (uncredited)
- Bad Men of Thunder Gap (1943) - Hank Turner
- Idaho (1943) - Henchman (uncredited)
- Santa Fe Scouts (1943) - Billy Dawson
- Wild Horse Stampede (1943) - Henchman Westy
- Daredevils of the West (1943, Serial) - Miller - Henchman (Ch. 1) (uncredited)
- West of Texas (1943) - Steve Conlon
- Song of Texas (1943) - Race Official (uncredited)
- The Stranger from Pecos (1943) - Deputy Steve (uncredited)
- Batman (1943, Serial) - Andrews - Henchman (uncredited)
- The Masked Marvel (1943, Serial) - Marine Café Patron #2 (uncredited)
- Six Gun Gospel (1943) - Murdered Gambler
- Silver Spurs (1943) - Henchman (uncredited)
- The Black Hills Express (1943) - Quitting Driver (uncredited)
- Wagon Tracks West (1943) - Lem Martin
- The Renegade (1943) - Henchman Pete
- Hail to the Rangers (1943) - Jessup
- The Man from the Rio Grande (1943) - King City Marshal (uncredited)
- False Colors (1943) - Poncho Townsman (uncredited)
- Overland Mail Robbery (1943) - Sheriff
- Canyon City (1943) - Sheriff Slocum (uncredited)
- In Old Oklahoma (1943) - Tom - Farmer on Train (uncredited)
- California Joe (1943) - Whitey (uncredited)
- The Woman of the Town (1943) - Crockett Henchman (uncredited)
- The Fighting Seabees (1944) - Johnson (uncredited)
- Captain America (1944, Serial) - Mack - Garage Thug [Ch. 7] (uncredited)
- Beneath Western Skies (1944) - Earl Phillips
- Mojave Firebrand (1944) - Miner (uncredited)
- Hidden Valley Outlaws (1944) - Sheriff McBride
- Rosie the Riveter (1944) - 1st Policeman Arresting Rosie (uncredited)
- The Lady and the Monster (1944) - Man Who Tails Cory (uncredited)
- Tucson Raiders (1944) - Matthews (voice, uncredited)
- Riding West (1944) - Gubbins (uncredited)
- The Tiger Woman (1944, Serial) - Capt. Dumont [Chs. 1, 9-10] (uncredited)
- Silent Partner (1944) - Cop (uncredited)
- Man from Frisco (1944) - Old Salt (uncredited)
- The Yellow Rose of Texas (1944) - Sheriff Allen
- Marshal of Reno (1944) - Sheriff
- Call of the Rockies (1944) - Henchman Hansen
- Silver City Kid (1944) - Sheriff Gibson
- Three Little Sisters (1944) - Twitchell
- The Girl Who Dared (1944) - Neilson - Gas Station Owner (uncredited)
- The San Antonio Kid (1944) - Henchman Long
- Stagecoach to Monterey (1944) - Chester Wade
- Cheyenne Wildcat (1944) - Harrison Colby
- Code of the Prairie (1944) - Henchman Loomis
- My Buddy (1944) - Guard (uncredited)
- Sheriff of Sundown (1944) - Sheriff Tom Carpenter
- Vigilantes of Dodge City (1944) - Denver
- Zorro's Black Whip (1944, Serial) - Commissioner James Bradley
- Faces in the Fog (1944) - Auto Court Manager
- Firebrands of Arizona (1944) - Wagon Driver
- Thoroughbreds (1944) - Pop
- Grissly's Millions (1945) - Policeman Ralph
- The Topeka Terror (1945) - William Hardy
- Great Stagecoach Robbery (1945) - Townsman (uncredited)
- Sheriff of Cimarron (1945) - Frank Holden
- Earl Carroll Vanities (1945) - Tom - Doorman
- Corpus Christi Bandits (1945) - Rocky
- Three's a Crowd (1945) - Grayson
- Flame of Barbary Coast (1945) - Thompson - Townsman in Mob (uncredited)
- Bells of Rosarita (1945) - Studio Gate Guard (uncredited)
- Federal Operator 99 (1945, Serial) - Prof. Crawford [Chs. 5-6]
- Road to Alcatraz (1945) - Guard (uncredited)
- Trail of Kit Carson (1945) - John Benton
- Oregon Trail (1945) - Sheriff Plenner
- Phantom of the Plains (1945) - Duchess Suitor (uncredited)
- Behind City Lights (1945) - Andrew Coleman
- Sunset in El Dorado (1945) - Sheriff Gridley
- Marshal of Laredo (1945) - Barton
- Sunset in El Dorado (1945) - Ben Duncan - Sheriff of Twin Wells
- Rough Riders of Cheyenne (1945) - Sheriff Edwards
- Dakota (1945) - Old-timer (uncredited)
- Girls of the Big House (1945) - Sheriff at Alma's Cell (uncredited)
- Colorado Pioneers (1945) - Sand Snipe
- The Cherokee Flash (1945) - Utah
- Wagon Wheels Westward (1945) - Fake Judge James E. Worth
- The Phantom Rider (1946, Serial) - Ceta - Medicine Man
- Days of Buffalo Bill (1946) - Banty McCabe
- California Gold Rush (1946) - Sheriff Peabody
- Crime of the Century (1946) - Dr. Jackson
- Sheriff of Redwood Valley (1946) - Sheriff
- Murder in the Music Hall (1946) - Ryan - Police Officer
- The Undercover Woman (1946) - Lem Stone
- Alias Billy the Kid (1946) - Dakota
- King of the Forest Rangers (1946, Serial) - Tom Judson [Ch. 1]
- Sun Valley Cyclone (1946) - Sheriff
- Passkey to Danger (1946) - Gerald Bates
- In Old Sacramento (1946) - Bartender (uncredited)
- Man from Rainbow Valley (1946) - Healey
- My Pal Trigger (1946) - Hotel Clerk (uncredited)
- Night Train to Memphis (1946) - Train Conductor (uncredited)
- Red River Renegades (1946) - Pop Underwood
- Conquest of Cheyenne (1946) - Sheriff Dan Perkins
- G.I. War Brides (1946) - (uncredited)
- The Invisible Informer (1946) - Eph Shroud
- Rio Grande Raiders (1946) - Sheriff Tom Hammon
- Roll on Texas Moon (1946) - Sheriff Bert Morris
- Santa Fe Uprising (1946) - Lafe Dibble
- Affairs of Geraldine (1946) - Studio Actor (uncredited)
- Out California Way (1946) - Johnny
- Son of Zorro (1947, Serial) - Mark Daniels (uncredited)
- Last Frontier Uprising (1947) - Skillet - Ranch Cook
- Homesteaders of Paradise Valley (1947) - Rancher
- Twilight on the Rio Grande (1947) - Tom - U.S. Customs Agent (uncredited)
- Dick Tracy's Dilemma (1947) - Cop in Squad Car (uncredited)
- That's My Man (1947) - Racetrack Man (uncredited)
- Saddle Pals (1947) - Dad Gardner
- Rustlers of Devil's Canyon (1947) - The Sheriff
- Blackmail (1947) - Tom - Cashier (uncredited)
- Wyoming (1947) - Will Jennings
- Jesse James Rides Again (1947, Serial) - Sam Bolton
- Marshal of Cripple Creek (1947) - Baker
- Along the Oregon Trail (1947) - Wagon Boss
- Heaven Only Knows (1947) - Townsman (uncredited)
- Driftwood (1947) - Townsman (uncredited)
- The Wild Frontier (1947) - Patrick MacSween
- Under Colorado Skies (1947) - Sheriff Blanchard
- Superman (1948, Serial) - Old-Timer at Mine (uncredited)
- Marshal of Amarillo (1948) - Mr. Snodgrass
- Mark of the Lash (1948) - Lem Kimmerly
- The Far Frontier (1948) - Anderson (uncredited)
- Frontier Investigator (1949) - Jed
- Brand of Fear (1949) - Marshal Blackjack Flint
- South of Rio (1949) - Jim Weston
- Sand (1949) - Clem (uncredited)
- San Antone Ambush (1949) - Tim - Bartender
- Riders in the Sky (1949) - Old Man Roberts
- Texas Manhunt (1949) - Colonel

1950s

- Cody of the Pony Express (1950, Serial) - Doc Laramie
- The Old Frontier (1950) - Banker
- Gunfire (1950) - Barfly (uncredited)
- The Blazing Sun (1950) - Tom Ellis
- Rough Riders of Durango (1951) - Evans - Rancher
- The Secret of Convict Lake (1951) - Jerry - Posse Member (uncredited)
- The Hills of Utah (1951) - Mayor Donovan (uncredited)
- The Old West (1952) - Chadwick (uncredited)
- Trail Guide (1952) - Old Timer
- Rancho Notorious (1952) - Deputy in Gunsight (uncredited)
- High Noon (1952) - Sam (uncredited)
- Apache Country (1952) - Patches - Stage Driver (uncredited)
- Blue Canadian Rockies (1952) - Pop Phillips
- The Marshal's Daughter (1953) - Sheriff Bill (uncredited)
- Pack Train (1953) - Dan Coleman
- Calamity Jane (1953) - Prospector (uncredited)
- Tarantula (1955) - Jeb - First Tramp (uncredited)
- Top Gun (1955) - Casey (uncredited)
- Tribute to a Bad Man (1956) - Cowboy (uncredited)
- Quincannon, Frontier Scout (1956) - Livery Stableman (uncredited)
- The Young Guns (1956) - Lookout (uncredited)
- Friendly Persuasion (1956) - Farmer on Front Line with Gard (uncredited)
- The Storm Rider (1957) - Todd (uncredited)
- Outlaw's Son (1957) - Ore Wagon Driver (uncredited)
- Domino Kid (1957) - Davis - Rancher (uncredited)
- The Tall Stranger (1957) - Ranch Hand (uncredited)
- Day of the Badman (1958) - Roy (uncredited)
- The Sheepman (1958) - Townsman (uncredited)
- Once Upon a Horse... (1958) - Old-Timer (uncredited)
- Man of the West (1958) - Tom (uncredited)
- The Saga of Hemp Brown (1958) - Floyd Leacock (uncredited)
- Good Day for a Hanging (1959) - Farmer Driving Wagon (uncredited)
- Lone Texan (1959) - Old Dan (uncredited)
- Bat Masterson (1959) - Once as the Town sheriff and another as drunken prisoner (uncredited)

1960s

- Let No Man Write My Epitaph (1960) - Minor Role (uncredited)
- Underworld U.S.A. (1961) - Drunk (uncredited)
- Bat Masterson (1961, TV Series) - Eddie
- 13 West Street (1962) - Prisoner (uncredited)
