= Corpus Christi Bandits =

1945 film by Wallace Grissell

- Theatrical release poster
- Directed by: Wallace Grissell
- Screenplay by: Norman S. Hall
- Produced by: Stephen Auer
- Starring: Allan Lane; Helen Talbot; Jack Kirk; Twinkle Watts; Francis McDonald; Roy Barcroft
- Cinematography: Bud Thackery
- Edited by: Charles Craft
- Production company: Republic Pictures
- Distributed by: Republic Pictures
- Release date: April 20, 1945
- Running time: 56 minutes
- Country: United States
- Language: English

Corpus Christi Bandits is a 1945 American Western film directed by Wallace Grissell and written by Norman S. Hall. The film stars Allan Lane, Helen Talbot, Jack Kirk, Twinkle Watts, Francis McDonald and Roy Barcroft. The film was released on April 20, 1945, by Republic Pictures.

== Plot ==
Captain James Christie of the United States Army Air Forces has returned to his home in Texas with a Distinguished Flying Cross earned from being a bomber pilot in the ETO. Prior to meeting the Governor of Texas in Austin, James's father relates the story of his grandfather Corpus Christi Jim.

Following the American Civil War, Jim and 3 fellow Confederate soldiers are unable to find work. They rob a stagecoach for a grubstake to set them up. Jim faces down dishonest gambler Wade Larkin and wins his saloon in a card game. He returns the money they robbed from the stagecoach, but Larkin's henchmen and the law are still after Jim.

== Cast ==
- Allan Lane as Captain James Christie / Corpus Christi Jim
- Helen Talbot as Dorothy Adams
- Jack Kirk as Editor Alonzo Adams
- Twinkle Watts as Nancy Christie
- Francis McDonald as Dad Christie
- Roy Barcroft as Wade Larkin
- Tom London as Henchman Rocky
- Kenne Duncan as Henchman Spade
- Robert J. Wilke as Henchman Steve
- Ruth Lee as Mom Christie
- Ed Cassidy as Marshal Dan Adams
- Emmett Vogan as Texas Governor
- Dickie Dillon as Brush
- Freddie Chapman as Stinky
- Shelby Bacon as Moonlight
