= The Topeka Terror =

1945 film by Howard Bretherton

- Theatrical release poster
- Directed by: Howard Bretherton
- Screenplay by: Patricia Harper; Norman S. Hall
- Story by: Patricia Harper
- Produced by: Stephen Auer
- Starring: Allan Lane; Linda Stirling; Earle Hodgins; Twinkle Watts; Roy Barcroft; Bud Geary
- Cinematography: Bud Thackery
- Edited by: Charles Craft
- Production company: Republic Pictures
- Distributed by: Republic Pictures
- Release date: January 26, 1945
- Running time: 55 minutes
- Country: United States
- Language: English

The Topeka Terror is a 1945 American Western film directed by Howard Bretherton, written by Patricia Harper and Norman S. Hall, and starring Allan Lane, Linda Stirling, Earle Hodgins, Twinkle Watts, Roy Barcroft and Bud Geary. It was released on January 26, 1945, by Republic Pictures.

== Plot ==
In 1893, a swarm of settlers descended on the town of Red Dust, located on the Cherokee Strip. Land agent Trent Parker (Frank Jaquet) was drowning in gambling debts. To pay them off, he accepts an offer from two swindlers (Roy Barcroft, Bud Geary) who have concocted a scheme to cheat the settlers out of their land. But then government agent Chad Stevens (Allan "Rocky" Lane) rides into town, promising the peaceful settlers that he will drive out the gang of thieves.

== Cast ==
- Allan Lane as Chad Stevens
- Linda Stirling as June Hardy
- Earle Hodgins as Don Quixote 'Ipso-Facto' Martindale
- Twinkle Watts as Midge Hardy
- Roy Barcroft as Ben Jode
- Bud Geary as Henchman Clyde Flint
- Tom London as William Hardy
- Frank Jaquet as Land Agent Trent Parker
- Jack Kirk as Joe Green
- Eva Novak as Mrs. Green
- Robert J. Wilke as Lynch-Mob Member
- Hank Bell as Stagecoach Driver
