= Walter Vernon =

Walter Vernon may refer to:

- Walter Liberty Vernon (1846–1914), English architect who worked in Australia
- Wally Vernon (Walter J. Vernon, 1905–1970), American comic and character actor and dancer
