= Man of the West =

1958 film by Anthony Mann

- Directed by: Anthony Mann
- Screenplay by: Reginald Rose
- Based on: The Border Jumpers; 1955 novel by Will C. Brown
- Produced by: Walter Mirisch
- Starring: Gary Cooper; Julie London; Lee J. Cobb; Arthur O'Connell
- Cinematography: Ernest Haller
- Edited by: Victor Heerman; Richard V. Heermance
- Music by: Leigh Harline
- Distributed by: United Artists
- Release date: October 1, 1958
- Running time: 100 min.
- Country: United States
- Language: English
- Budget: $1.5 million
- Box office: $1.75 million

Man of the West is a 1958 American Western film noir film starring Gary Cooper and directed by Anthony Mann, produced by Walter Mirisch and distributed by United Artists. The screenplay, written by Reginald Rose, is based on the 1955 novel The Border Jumpers, by Will C. Brown. Julie London, Lee J. Cobb, Jack Lord, and Arthur O'Connell co-star with John Dehner, Robert J. Wilke, and Royal Dano in supporting roles. The film is one of Cooper's final Westerns.

The film premiered on October 1, 1958. At the time of release, the film was largely panned by American critics, but it was praised by Jean-Luc Godard, who, before he became a director, was a film critic. Godard claimed that Man of the West was the best film of the year. Decades after the film's release, it has gained a cult following and greater acclaim, with film historian Philip French claiming the film to be Anthony Mann's masterpiece, containing Cooper's finest performance.

== Plot ==
Link Jones rides into Crosscut, Texas to have a bite to eat, then catch a train to Fort Worth, where he intends to use the savings of his community of Good Hope to hire a schoolteacher.

On the train platform Sam Beasley speaks briefly with Link, rousing the suspicions of the town marshal, Sam being a known gambler and con man. When the lawman remarks that Link looks familiar, he gives a false name, Henry Wright.

Aboard the train Sam joins Link, learns of his mission in Fort Worth and claims he can be of help. Sam introduces him to the Crosscut saloon singer, Billie Ellis, insisting she could make an ideal teacher.

Their conversation is overheard by Alcutt, a shady-looking passenger. When the train stops to pick up wood for additional fuel, male passengers help load it on to the train but Alcutt remains on board, feigning sleep. From a window he signals to three horsemen, Coaley Tobin, Trout and Ponch, who attempt to rob the train. The armed guard on the train thwarts the attempt.

Link tries to intervene and is knocked unconscious. The train departs, with Alcutt riding off with Link's bag containing Good Hope's money. Alcutt is wounded as he and the three other robbers flee.

Link revives to discover that he, Sam and Billie have been left behind, many miles from the nearest town. Link leads them on foot to a ramshackle farm, admitting that he lived there years earlier. Link sends the others to wait in the barn, giving Billie his coat to wear. Link enters the rundown house and finds the train robbers hiding inside.

Coaley is suspicious of Link's claim that he simply wants to rest for the night. They are interrupted by ageing outlaw Dock Tobin, who is startled to see Link, his nephew, whom he raised to be a killer and a thief. More than a dozen years earlier, in order to go straight, Link abandoned Tobin, and the old man laments that nothing has been the same since. He introduces Link to the others, including Link's cousin, Coaley.

Disturbed by the revelation of Link's true identity, Coaley demonstrates his toughness by shooting Alcutt, who is near death from his wound. Realising the danger of his situation, Link brings Sam and Billie in from the barn and lies to Tobin, telling him that Billie is his woman and also that he purposely set out to find Dock after being left behind by the train.

Tobin reveals his long-held ambition to rob the bank in the town of Lassoo and asserts that Link's return to the gang makes that possible and will breathe new life into them all. To protect the lives of his companions Link agrees to participate in the holdup. After Link and Sam are sent outside to dig a grave and bury Alcutt, an increasingly drunken Coaley decides to force Billie to strip. Her cries alert Link and, when he returns to the cabin, Coaley holds a knife to his throat while continuing to demand Billie remove her clothes.

When she is nearly undressed, Tobin steps in and ends the situation. He tells everyone to go to sleep and sends Link and Billie to sleep in the barn.

Claude Tobin, another cousin, arrives the next morning and is displeased at finding Link there. Tobin rejects the suggestion of Claude and Coaley that it would be best to kill Link and the others. They all depart on the four-day trip to Lassoo in three wagons and two on horseback.

When they make camp on the trail, Link seeks revenge for the brutal treatment of Billie at the ranch and goads the brutal Coaley into a fistfight. Link beats his cousin severely, then forcibly strips him of his clothes as revenge for forcing Billie to strip at the cabin. Deeply humiliated, Coaley attempts to shoot the unarmed Link, but Sam interferes and is shot dead instead. Tobin then shoots Coaley dead for disobeying him.

During the trip Billie bemoans the fact that Link is a man worth loving but that she cannot have him. He says he has a wife and two children in Good Hope.

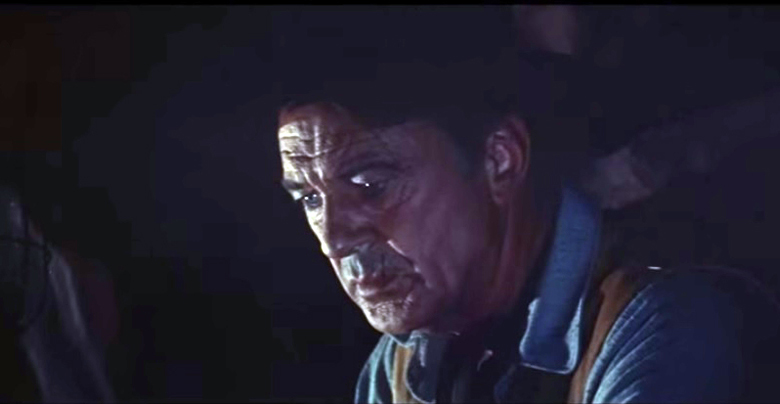
Gary Cooper

With the town of Lassoo in sight, Link volunteers to go in and do the holdup job, secretly hoping that in town he can seek help. Tobin insists that he be accompanied by the mute Trout. It turns out that Lassoo is a ghost town, its bank deserted except for a frightened Mexican woman named Juanita, who has the two at gunpoint when Trout coldly shoots her. Link uses the woman's gun to kill Trout. He then awaits the arrival of Claude and Ponch. In a drawn-out gun battle, Link kills Ponch first, then eventually and with some regret – because as children the two of them had been fairly close – Claude. Juanita's husband returns as Link leaves town. "I'm sorry" is all Link can say to him.

Returning to camp, Link discovers to his horror that Billie has been raped and beaten. He goes in search of Tobin, who is on a cliff nearby. Link calls out to his uncle that he, like Lassoo, is a ghost and is finished, and Link is going to take him in. Tobin starts ranting and firing his gun, and Link finally shoots him and reclaims the bag of Good Hope's money.

Riding back to civilization, Billie tells Link she loves him but, knowing that he intends to return to his home and his family, she is resigned to the fact that she must resume her singing career and go on with life alone.

== Cast ==
- Gary Cooper as Link Jones
- Julie London as Billie Ellis
- Lee J. Cobb as Dock Tobin
- Arthur O'Connell as Sam Beasley
- Jack Lord as Coaley
- Royal Dano as Trout
- John Dehner as Claude
- Robert J. Wilke as Ponch
- J. Williams as Alcutt
- Emory Parnell as Henry
- Chief Tahachee as Pio
- Frank Ferguson as Crosscut Marshal (uncredited)
- Tom London as Tom (uncredited)

The film reunited Gary Cooper and Robert J. Wilke, who were adversaries in High Noon.

== Production ==
=== Development ===
The script of the film, which was written by Reginald Rose (best known for writing 12 Angry Men (1957)), was based on the 1955 novel The Border Jumpers by Will C. Brown. The title of the film had nothing to do with the novel entitled Man of the West, which was written by screenwriter Philip Yordan. Yordan's novel had been adapted into a film called Gun Glory, which starred Stewart Granger in the lead role. The producer of the film, Walter Mirisch (whose company produced the Academy Award-nominated films: The Magnificent Seven (1960), West Side Story (1961), The Great Escape (1963) and In the Heat of the Night (1967)), assigned director Anthony Mann to direct an adaptation of the novel.

=== Casting ===
Stewart Granger was originally considered for the lead role. James Stewart, who had worked with director Anthony Mann in eight movies, five of them westerns: Winchester '73 (1950), Bend of the River (1952), The Naked Spur (1953), The Far Country (1954) and The Man from Laramie (1955), eagerly wanted the role. Supposedly, Stewart was extremely upset when Mann didn't give him the script for the film, felt betrayed, and had no interest in working with him ever again, although Mann thought that Stewart would be unfit for the role. Another probable reason why the director didn't give Stewart the script was that both had fallen out during the shooting of Night Passage (1957). While Mann and Stewart felt that the script of the film needed some rewrites, Mann wanted a darker edge for the main character of the film and dropped out because Stewart softened up the character and sang a few songs in the final film, as a showcase for his own accordion playing. With Mann out of the picture, James Neilson took over his position as director of Night Passage. For Man of the West, Gary Cooper was eventually cast in the lead role of Link Jones, a former outlaw who is forced to relive his past. This was Cooper's first true Western since 1954's Vera Cruz with Burt Lancaster. He initially felt that he was miscast in the role of the former outlaw because he was twenty years older than the character; Cooper was 56 at the time of filming, the lead character being 36. However, in an interview at the 2008 Cinecon in Hollywood, Mirisch claimed that having just wrapped Love in the Afternoon, he promptly signed Cooper for another picture, which ended up being this one. He stated that they hadn't even considered a director yet, so Stewart was never a factor.

According to biographer Jeffrey Meyers, Cooper, who struggled with moral conflicts in his personal life, "understood the anguish of a character striving to retain his integrity ... [and] brought authentic feeling to the role of a tempted and tormented, yet essentially decent man."

Mann found working with Reginald Rose "a little more difficult, because they had bought his script and they wanted to stick with it, and I didn't really want to." Mann said "I had to try and break it from its rigidity, which was mostly talk. I would have changed the girl completely, if I'd only driven hard enough. But I wasn't able to convince the guys who were producing. I eventually convinced Cooper, but by then it was too late." Mann wanted to change the girl to Cooper's wife. "It would have been much more moving. The other girl was stupid, and I hated it, and wanted to change it, and they wouldn't let me. Just imagine if the wife had to do what she has to do. Then it becomes much more poignant; then he would fight to the death."

Lee J. Cobb (who had starred in 12 Angry Men as one of the twelve jurors) played the role of Dock Tobin. Despite playing the uncle of the main character, Cobb was ten years younger than Cooper. Make-up was applied in an attempt to make Cobb look older than Cooper. The age difference was also obvious with John Dehner, who played a key role as Link's cousin and childhood friend, Claude. Dehner was fourteen years younger than Cooper and it was readily apparent.

Arthur O'Connell played Sam Beasley, a fast-talking gambler, and saloon singer Billie Ellis was played by Julie London. London said this was her favorite movie. Tobin's henchmen Coaley, Trout and Ponch (who rob the train) were played by Jack Lord, Royal Dano and Robert J. Wilke respectively. J. Williams played Alcutt, one of the passengers on the train, and Chief Tahachee was cast as Pio.

Joe Dominguez, Dick Elliott, Frank Ferguson, Herman and Signe Hack, Anne Kunde, Tom London, Tina Menard, Emory Parnell, John Wayne's stuntmen Chuck Roberson, Glen Walters and Glen Wilkerson play minor roles in the film and are uncredited.

=== Filming ===
Principal photography on Man of the West started and ended in 1958, with a budget of $1.5 million. The film was shot in the widescreen CinemaScope process (which was introduced in 1953) by cinematographer Ernest Haller, who is best known for his Academy Award-winning work in Gone with the Wind.

Although the film takes place in Texas, most of the film was shot in California. The train scenes were shot on the Sierra Railroad in Jamestown, California. The Red Rock Canyon State Park, Santa Clarita, Thousand Oaks, Newhall and the Mojave Desert all served as filming locations for the film. Two ranches located on Newhall and Thousand Oaks respectively were used as sets which were designed by art director Hilyard M. Brown, best known for his work in Cleopatra (for which he won an Academy Award for Best Art Direction), Creature from the Black Lagoon and The Night of the Hunter.

Gary Cooper did his own horse-riding scenes despite physical pain that he suffered from a car accident years earlier. Chuck Roberson, Jack Williams and Jack N. Young were the stunt performers for the film.

During a snow storm, Mann observed Cooper's eyes, which fascinated him: "It's all in the eyes. The heroes, all the stars the public loves, have very light blue eyes or green eyes....The eyes reflect the inner flame that animates the heroes. The guys with dark eyes play supporting roles or become character actors."

== Themes ==
Canadian film critic Robin Wood noted that Man of the West is director Anthony Mann's version of William Shakespeare's play King Lear, whose elements appeared in The Furies with Walter Huston, The Naked Spur and The Man From Laramie, with its sense of emotional whirlwind, and an older order crumbling. Man of the West, like most Mann films, is a tale of redemption. We are asked to consider the essential monstrousness of the hero, and whether redemption is a tenable idea. The noble frontiersman is made the Other, and one not very deserving of sympathy, a savage whose past ghoulishness seems unimaginable. Wood also noted that the film looks down the road to the contemporary horror film: The Texas Chain Saw Massacre (Tobe Hooper, 1974) and The Hills Have Eyes (Wes Craven, 1977), with their savage clans and desiccated American wasteland.

== Reception ==
When first released, the film was largely ignored by American critics, though renowned French critic Jean-Luc Godard regarded it as the best film released that year, writing that "each shot of Man of the West gives one the impression that Anthony Mann is reinventing the western, exactly as Matisse's portraits reinvent the features of Piero della Francesca...In other words, he both shows and demonstrates, innovates and copies, criticizes and creates." Howard Thompson, in The New York Times, gave it one of the few raves in the mainstream press. Variety's Powe called it "uneven but often powerful".

In the decades since the film's release, it has garnered a cult following as well as considerably greater acclaim. Some, such as The Guardian's Derek Malcolm consider the film Mann's best and a landmark in the western genre's canon. Malcolm included the film in his 2000 list The Century of Film. Critic and film historian Philip French cites Man of the West as Anthony Mann's masterpiece, containing Gary Cooper's greatest performance. Jonathan Rosenbaum of The Chicago Reader also hailed it as a "masterpiece," comparing it to "the grimness of Greek tragedy, its mountains and rock formations often suggesting the silent witness of an ancient amphitheater...the penultimate shoot-out in the ghost town is an appropriately eerie split-level confrontation between two wounded, supine men–one stretched out on a porch at screen left, the other stretched out underneath the porch at screen right, as if he were already buried. It's a key example of the way that landscape and architecture, people and settings, painting and drama, image and idea, classicism and modernism all merge on Mann's monumental canvases."

Man of the West maintains a 94% approval rating on the Rotten Tomatoes film website, based on reviews from 17 critics.

=== "Morally objectionable" ===
The trade publication Motion Picture Daily reported in 1958 that the National Legion of Decency objected to the content of Man of the West. In its October 3 issue, just two days after the film's release, the daily magazine provides a few examples of the Legion's classification system for judging a Hollywood production's level of "decency":

Two pictures were placed in Class B, as morally objectionable in part for all by the Legion of Decency, which reviewed seven films this week. In the B category are "Man of the West" and "Queen of Outer Space." Objection to the first was explained thusly, "the highly moral nature of this story is substantially marred by excessive brutality and unnecessary suggestiveness." Of "Queen," the group said it contains "suggestive costuming."

== See also ==
- List of American films of 1958
- List of cult films
