= Stagecoach to Monterey =

1944 film by Lesley Selander

- Theatrical release poster
- Directed by: Lesley Selander
- Screenplay by: Norman S. Hall
- Produced by: Stephen Auer
- Starring: Allan Lane; Peggy Stewart; Wally Vernon; Twinkle Watts; Tom London; LeRoy Mason
- Cinematography: William Bradford
- Edited by: Harry Keller
- Music by: Joseph Dubin
- Production company: Republic Pictures
- Distributed by: Republic Pictures
- Release date: September 15, 1944
- Running time: 55 minutes
- Country: United States
- Language: English

Stagecoach to Monterey is a 1944 American Western film directed by Lesley Selander, written by Norman S. Hall, and starring Allan Lane, Peggy Stewart, Wally Vernon, Twinkle Watts, Tom London and LeRoy Mason. It was released on September 15, 1944, by Republic Pictures.

== Cast ==
- Allan Lane as Bruce Redmond posing as Chick Weaver
- Peggy Stewart as Jessie Wade
- Wally Vernon as Throckmorton 'Other-Hand' Snodgrass
- Twinkle Watts as Inky Wade
- Tom London as Chester Wade
- LeRoy Mason as Black Jack Barstow
- Roy Barcroft as J. Rodney Stevens
- Kenne Duncan as Henchman Joe
- Bud Geary as Henchman Gans
- Carl Sepulveda as Henchman Roy
- Jack Kirk as Bartender Fred
- Fred Graham as Henchman Mac
