= Sheriff of Las Vegas =

1944 film by Lesley Selander

- Directed by: Lesley Selander
- Written by: Norman S. Hall (screenplay); Fred Harman (based characters created in the comic strip)
- Produced by: Stephen Auer
- Starring: Wild Bill Elliott
- Cinematography: William Bradford
- Edited by: Charles Craft
- Music by: Richard Cherwin
- Distributed by: Republic Pictures Corp.
- Release date: 1944
- Running time: 65 minutes (original run time)
- Country: United States
- Language: English

Sheriff of Las Vegas is a 1944 American Western film directed by Lesley Selander and starring Wild Bill Elliott in the role of Red Ryder Costarring as Little Beaver, was actor (Bobby) Robert Blake. It was the sixth of twenty-three Red Ryder feature films that would be produced by Republic Pictures.

== Plot ==
The Duchess Alice Fleming, living in Las Vegas, Nevada promises to help the local schoolteacher Ann Carter (Peggy Stewart) with her "wild" boyfriend, Tom Blackwell (Jay Kirby). Red Ryder is asked to lend a hand by the Duchess but when he does, he discovers Tom drunk in the saloon owned by Dan Sedley (William Haade). Red is interrupted however, by an attempted bank robbery. He foils the heist and retrieves the money, which he returns to Arthur Stanton (Selmer Jackson), the bank president. What Red doesn't know is that Stanton has embezzled over $40,000 from his bank and afterwards, had his bank robbed to cover the crime.

In the meantime, Tom Blackwell's father, Judge Homer Blackwell (John Hamilton) says that he's tired of his son's behavior and will cut him out of his will. He asks Stanton to bring a list of his securities to his office that he might reconcile his books. To protect himself, Sedley slips into the Judge's office and kills him.

Red Ryder, who has been appointed Sheriff, is compelled to arrest Tom who had threatened his father. Meanwhile, Red has a newspaper story printed stating that he has discovered evidence that vindicates Tom. The worried Stanton orders his crime partner, Sedley, to stir up a lynch mob. He wants to take over Stanton's large estate to cover the embezzled funds.

In order to protect Tom from the gathering lynch mob, Red hands him over to the Duchess but then tells Stanton that Tom is hiding in Ann's schoolhouse. Red's suspicions of Stanton are confirmed when the illicit banker sends Sedley to the schoolhouse to kill Tom. In the process, Sedley is mortally wounded by Red but before dying, confesses to the Judge's murder.

Ryder sets a trap for Stanton by sending Tom to Stanton's office seeking help. Stanton, sensing an opportunity, pulls a gun on Tom but is captured by Red Ryder before he can kill Tom. Sedley is later convicted and imprisoned.

Tom reforms and is ready to settle down with Ann, even vowing to use some of his inheritance to elect Red to the office of territorial governor. This proves to be too much for the red-headed cowboy who is last seen on the screen, riding off in the distance with Little Beaver (Robert Blake).

== Cast ==
- Wild Bill Elliott as Red Ryder
- Robert Blake as Little Beaver
- Alice Fleming as The Duchess (Red's Aunt)
- Peggy Stewart as Ann Carter
- Selmer Jackson as Arthur Stanton
- William Haade as Dan Sedley
- Jay Kirby as Tom Blackwell
- John Hamilton as Judge Homer T. Blackwell
- Kenne Duncan as Henchman Whitey
- Bud Geary as Henchman Nick
- Jack Kirk as Henchman Buck
- Dickie Dillon as Oliver Blake
- Doc Adams as Townsman in Street (uncredited)
- Freddie Chapman as Ulysses Botts (uncredited)
- Herman Hack as Bartender (uncredited)
- Frank McCarroll as Sheriff Lonegan (uncredited)
- Artie Ortego as Townsman in Street (uncredited)
- Robert J. Wilke as Barfly (uncredited)

== Production ==
Sheriff of Las Vegas was based on the characters created by Fred Harman for his Red Ryder comic strip through a special licensing agreement with Stephen Slesinger. The film was released December 31, 1944. and then later re-released on February 7, 1949. The picture was shot on the studio's back lot along with outdoor locations at Iverson Ranch, 1 Iverson Lane, Chatsworth, Los Angeles, CA, USA.

=== Stunts ===
- Tommy Coats
- Fred Graham
- Frank McCarroll
- Tom Steele
