= Outlaws of Santa Fe =

1944 film by Howard Bretherton

- Theatrical release poster
- Directed by: Howard Bretherton
- Screenplay by: Norman S. Hall
- Produced by: Edward J. White
- Starring: Don "Red" Barry; Helen Talbot; Wally Vernon; Twinkle Watts; Charles Morton; Herbert Heyes
- Cinematography: John MacBurnie
- Edited by: Charles Craft
- Music by: Mort Glickman
- Production company: Republic Pictures
- Distributed by: Republic Pictures
- Release date: April 4, 1944
- Running time: 56 minutes
- Country: United States
- Language: English

Outlaws of Santa Fe is a 1944 American Western film directed by Howard Bretherton and written by Norman S. Hall. The film stars Don "Red" Barry, Helen Talbot, Wally Vernon, Twinkle Watts, Charles Morton and Herbert Heyes. The film was released on April 4, 1944, by Republic Pictures.

== Cast ==
- Don "Red" Barry as Bob Conroy aka Bob Hackett
- Helen Talbot as Ruth Gordon
- Wally Vernon as Buckshot Peters
- Twinkle Watts as Winky Gordon
- Charles Morton as Jim Hackett
- Herbert Heyes as Henry Jackson
- Bud Geary as Steve
- LeRoy Mason as Trigger McGurn
- Kenne Duncan as Henchman Chuck
- Nolan Leary as Mayor Ward
- Walter Soderling as Judge Turner
- Edmund Cobb as Marshal Billings
- Frank McCarroll as Henchman Bill
- Bob Kortman as Henchman Ed
- Emmett Lynn as Saloon Drunk
