= Marshal of Reno =

1944 film

- Directed by: Wallace Grissell
- Written by: Joseph O'Donnell and Taylor Caven (original story), Anthony Coldeway (screenplay), Fred Harman (comic strip)
- Produced by: Louis Gray
- Starring: Wild Bill Elliott
- Cinematography: Reggie Lanning
- Edited by: Charles Craft
- Music by: Joseph Dubin
- Distributed by: Republic Pictures
- Release date: July 2, 1944
- Running time: 54 minutes
- Country: United States
- Language: English

Marshal of Reno is a 1944 American Western film directed by Wallace Grissell starring Wild Bill Elliott in the role of Red Ryder. It was the second of twenty-three Red Ryder feature films that would be produced by Republic Pictures. The picture was shot on the studio's back lot along with outdoor locations at Iverson Ranch, 1 Iverson Lane, Chatsworth, Los Angeles, CA, USA.

== Plot ==
An avalanche of crime prevents the Judge of Blue Springs (Tom Chatterton) from making this western town the new county seat. Behind the anarchy lie a number of devious citizens of a nearby town seeking to make certain that it is their town that is chosen. This town's news editor, John Palmer (Herbert Rawlinson), head up the gang of lawless troublemakers that plot to defeat Blue Springs chances of success. Two Eastern youths, Danny Boyd and Lee Graham (Jay Kirby and Blake Edwards) ride into the situation and are mistaken for road agents. The outlaws frame the violence on Boyd whose friend, Lee, is unjustly murdered. Red Ryder and Little Beaver intervene to prevent Boyd from going after revenge. Editor Palmer is exposed as being head of the gang and is brought to justice, along with his gang of outlaws.

== Cast ==
- Wild Bill Elliott as Red Ryder
- Robert Blake as Little Beaver
- Alice Fleming as The Duchess (Red's Aunt)
- George "Gabby" Hayes as Gabby
- Herbert Rawlinson as Editor John Palmer
- Jay Kirby as Danny Boyd
- LeRoy Mason as Faro Carson
- Blake Edwards as Lee Graham
- Fred Graham as Henchman Drake
- Kirk as Henchman Kellogg
- Kenne Duncan as Henchman Adams
- Bud Geary as Henchman Ward
- Tom Steele as Stagecoach Robber
- Tom London as Sheriff
- Tom Chatterton as The Judge
- Roy Barcroft as (voice) (uncredited)
- Fred Burns as Townsman (uncredited)
- Horace B. Carpenter as Townsman (uncredited)
- George Chesebro as Barfly (uncredited)
- Edmund Cobb as Bob Wendall (uncredited)
- Jim Corey as Barfly (uncredited)
- Bert Dillard as Henchman (uncredited)
- Augie Gomez as Barfly (uncredited)
- Chick Hannan as Barfly (uncredited)
- Neal Hart as Townsman (uncredited)
- Charles King as Stagecoach Robber (uncredited)
- Jack O'Shea as Barfly (uncredited)
- Pascale Perry as Barfly (uncredited)
- Rose Plumer as Townswoman (uncredited)
- Hal Price as Joe Richards (uncredited)
- Marshall Reed as Henchman (uncredited)
- Carl Sepulveda as Stagecoach Driver (uncredited)
- Charles Sullivan as Mustang Saloon Bartender (uncredited)
- Albert Taylor as Posse Rider Brownie (uncredited)
- Ken Terrell as Mustang Saloon Waiter (uncredited)
- Ted Wells as Posse Rider (uncredited)
- Robert J. Wilke as Deputy (uncredited)

== Production ==
Marshal of Reno was based on Fred Harman's comic strip, Red Ryder. Blake Edwards, the young man framed for murder, went on to become a famous producer-director.

=== Stunts ===
- Tom Steele
- Bud Geary
- Fred Graham
- Ken Terrel
