= Sunset in El Dorado =

1945 film by Frank McDonald

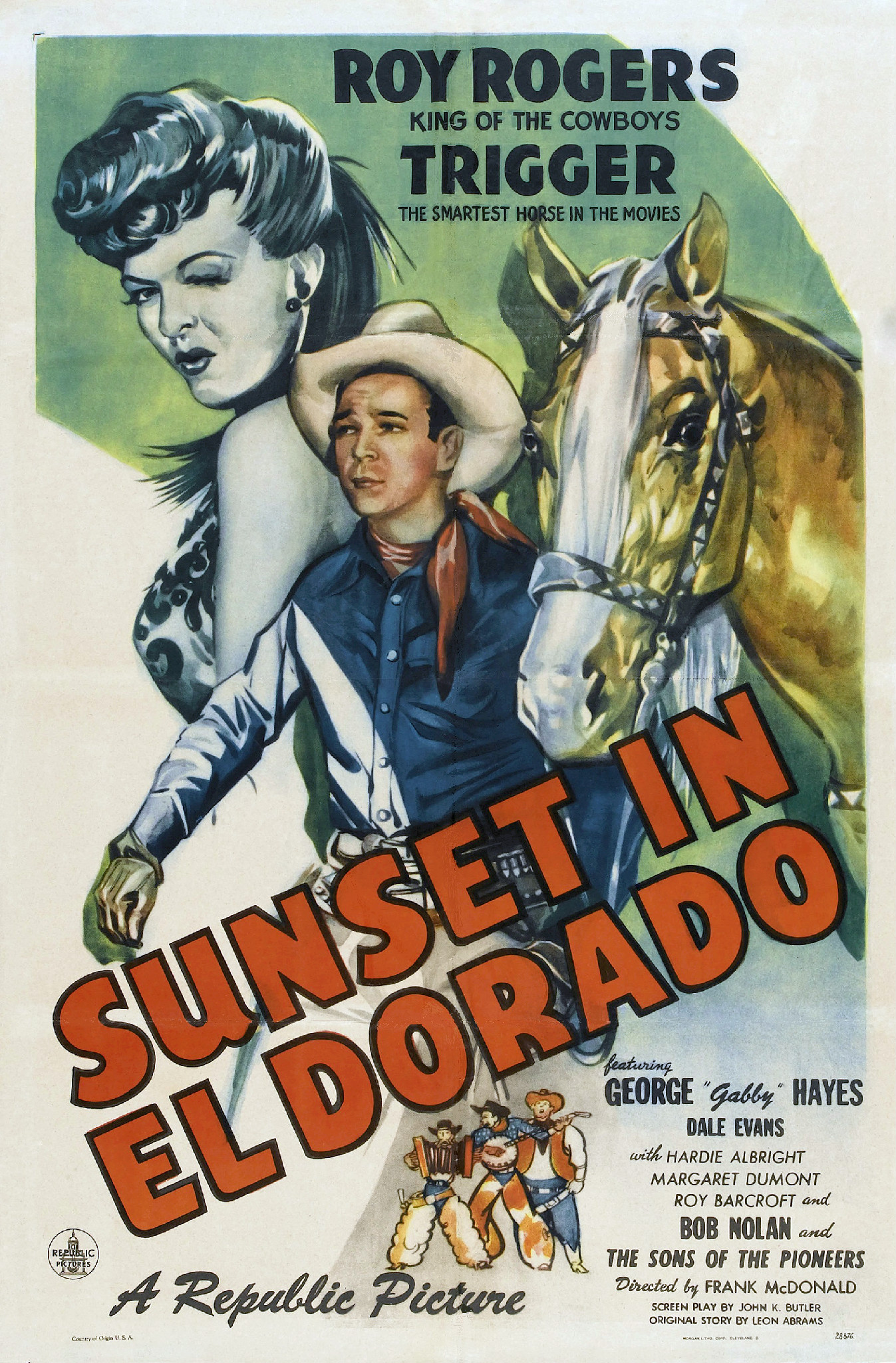
- Film poster
- Directed by: Frank McDonald
- Starring: Roy Rogers
- Distributed by: Republic Pictures
- Release date: September 29, 1945
- Running time: 65 minutes 54 minutes
- Country: United States
- Language: English

Sunset in El Dorado is a 1945 American Western film directed by Frank McDonald and starring Roy Rogers.

== Cast ==
- Roy Rogers as himself
- Trigger as Roy's horse
- Dale Evans as Lucille Wiley/Kansas Kate
- George 'Gabby' Hayes as Gabby
- Margaret Dumont as Aunt Dolly/Aunt Arabella
- Hardie Albright as Cecil Phelps/Cyril Earle
- Roy Barcroft as Buster Welch
- Tom London as Sheriff Gridley
- Stanley Price as Henchman Lyle Fish
- Robert J. Wilke as Henchman Curly Roberts
- Ed Cassidy as U. S. Marshall
- Dorothy Granger as Maise - Switchboard Operator
- Bob Nolan as Band leader of Sons of the Pioneers
