= Down Texas Way =

1942 film directed by Howard Bretherton

- Theatrical release poster
- Directed by: Howard Bretherton
- Screenplay by: Adele Buffington
- Produced by: Scott R. Dunlap
- Starring: Buck Jones; Tim McCoy; Raymond Hatton; Luana Walters; Dave O'Brien; Lois Austin
- Cinematography: Harry Neumann
- Edited by: Carl Pierson
- Music by: Frank Sanucci
- Production company: Monogram Pictures
- Distributed by: Monogram Pictures
- Release date: May 22, 1942
- Running time: 57 minutes
- Country: United States
- Language: English

Down Texas Way is a 1942 American Western film directed by Howard Bretherton and written by Adele Buffington. This is the sixth film in Monogram Pictures' Rough Riders film series, and stars Buck Jones as Marshal Buck Roberts, Tim McCoy as Marshal Tim McCall and Raymond Hatton as Marshal Sandy Hopkins, with Luana Walters, Dave O'Brien and Lois Austin. The film was released on May 22, 1942, by Monogram Pictures.

== Cast ==
- Buck Jones as Buck Roberts
- Tim McCoy as Tim McCall
- Raymond Hatton as Sandy Hopkins
- Luana Walters as Mary Hopkins
- Dave O'Brien as Dave Dodge
- Lois Austin as Stella
- Glenn Strange as Sheriff Trump
- Harry Woods as Bert Logan
- Tom London as Pete
- John Merton as Steve
- Silver as Silver
