= Wallace Grissell =

British director and editor

- Born: 3 September 1904; Hounslow, London
- Died: 5 April 1954 (aged 49); Camarillo, California, United States
- Occupation: Film director
- Years active: 1944-1966

Wallace Grissell (3 September 1904 – 5 April 1954) was a British director and editor.

== Filmography ==
- The Tiger Woman (1944)
- Marshal of Reno (1944)
- Haunted Harbor (1944)
- Vigilantes of Dodge City (1944)
- Zorro's Black Whip (1944)
- Manhunt of Mystery Island (1945)
- Corpus Christi Bandits (ca Wallace A. Grissell, 1945)
- Wanderer of the Wasteland (1945)
- Federal Operator 99 (1945)
- Who's Guilty? (1945)
- Motor Maniacs (film scurt, 1946 )
- Let's Make Rhythm (film scurt, 1947)
- Tex Beneke and the Glenn Miller Band (film scurt, 1947)
- Wild Horse Mesa (ca Wallace A. Grissell, 1947)
- Western Heritage (ca Wallace A. Grissell, 1948)
- Captain Video: Master of the Stratosphere (ca Wallace A. Grissell, 1951)
- A Yank in Indo-China (1952)
- King of the Congo (ca Wallace A. Grissell, 1952)
- Jungle Gold (film TV, 1966)
- Captain Mephisto and the Transformation Machine (film TV, 1966)
