= Nan of the North =

1922 film

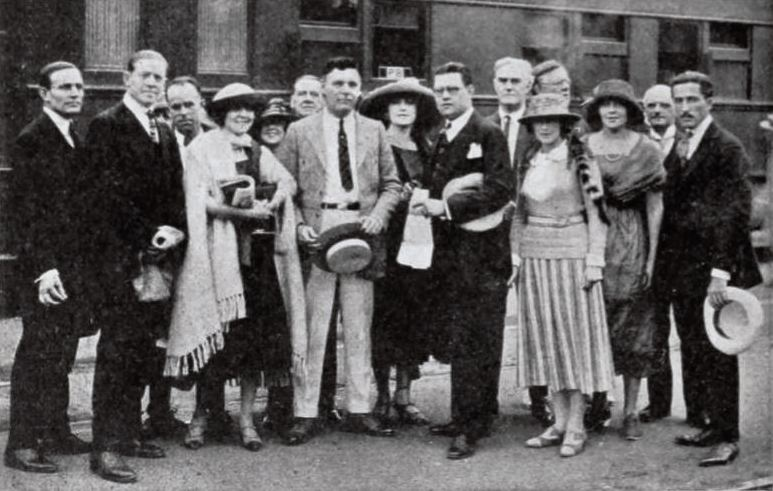
- Cast and crew headed for Yellowstone Park for location shots
- Directed by: Duke Worne
- Written by: Karl R. Coolidge
- Starring: Ann Little; Tom London
- Distributed by: Arrow Film Company
- Release date: March 1, 1922
- Running time: 15 episodes
- Country: United States
- Language: Silent (English intertitles)

Nan of the North is a 1922 American adventure film serial directed by Duke Worne. The film is considered to be lost.

== Cast ==
- Ann Little as Nan
- Tom London as Dick Driscoll (credited as Leonard Clapham)
- Joseph W. Girard as Yukon Hays
- Hal Wilson as Gaspar Le Sage
- Howard Crampton as Igloo
- J. Morris Foster as Bruce Vane
- Edith Stayart as Celeste
- Boris Karloff as Undetermined Role (uncredited)

== Chapter titles ==
1. Missile from Mars
2. Fountain of Fury
3. Brink of Despair
4. In Cruel Clutches
5. On Terror's Trail
6. The Cards of Chance
7. Into the Depths
8. Burning Sands
9. Power of Titano
10. A Bolt from the Sky
11. The Ride for a Life
12. Adrift
13. Facing Death at Sea
14. The Volcano
15. Consequences

== See also ==
- List of film serials
- List of film serials by studio
- List of lost films
- Boris Karloff filmography
