= Trail of Kit Carson =

1945 film by Lesley Selander

- Theatrical release poster
- Directed by: Lesley Selander
- Screenplay by: Jack Natteford; Albert DeMond
- Story by: Jack Natteford
- Produced by: Stephen Auer
- Starring: Allan Lane; Helen Talbot; Tom London; Twinkle Watts; Roy Barcroft; Kenne Duncan
- Cinematography: Bud Thackery
- Edited by: Ralph Dixon
- Production company: Republic Pictures
- Distributed by: Republic Pictures
- Release date: July 11, 1945
- Running time: 57 minutes
- Country: United States
- Language: English

Trail of Kit Carson is a 1945 American Western film directed by Lesley Selander, written by Jack Natteford and Albert DeMond, and starring Allan Lane, Helen Talbot, Tom London, Twinkle Watts, Roy Barcroft and Kenne Duncan. It was released on July 11, 1945, by Republic Pictures.

== Cast ==
- Allan Lane as Bill Harmon
- Helen Talbot as Joan Benton
- Tom London as John Benton
- Twinkle Watts as Peggy Bailey
- Roy Barcroft as Doc Ryan
- Kenne Duncan as Trigger Chandler
- Jack Kirk as Sheriff Bailey
- Bud Geary as Henchman Red Snyder
- Tom Dugan as Bartender Bart Hammond
- George Chesebro as Kirby
- Robert J. Wilke as Dave MacRoy
- Freddie Chapman as Freddie
- Dickie Dillon as Dickie
