= Federal Operator 99 =

1945 film

- Directed by: Spencer Gordon Bennet; Yakima Canutt; Wallace Grissell
- Written by: Albert DeMond; Basil Dickey; Jesse Duffy; Joseph Poland
- Produced by: Ronald Davidson (associate producer)
- Starring: Marten Lamont; Helen Talbot; George J. Lewis; Lorna Gray; Hal Taliaferro
- Cinematography: Bud Thackery
- Edited by: Cliff Bell and Victor Appel
- Music by: Richard Cherwin (musical director)
- Distributed by: Republic Pictures
- Release date: July 7, 1945
- Running time: 12 chapters / 169 minutes (serial); 100 minutes (TV)
- Country: United States
- Language: English

Federal Operator 99 is a 1945 American movie serial from Republic Pictures. It was later edited down into a feature version titled F.B.I. 99 for television. The serial is about an FBI agent named Jerry Blake who battles gentleman thief Jim Belmont, who escapes custody with help of his gang and begins a wave of crimes, beginning with plotting to steal the crown jewels of the Princess Cornelia.

== Plot ==
Crime lord James 'Jim' Belmont (George J. Lewis) escapes FBI custody and resumes his criminal empire, only to be thwarted at every turning point by British-accented Jerry Blake, the FBI's Operator 99 (Marten Lamont). Belmont plots to steal the crown jewels of the Princess Cornelia, with the aid of his cohorts Matt Farrell, Rita Parker and his crafty secretary Morton. The criminals succeed in stealing the jewels, then offer to ransom them back, using Jerry Blake (Operator 99) as the go-between. Blake foils their plot and also acts against different criminal engagements by Belmont such as trying to steal a car once owned by Belmont’s partner, a car into which valuable gold has been melted and whose location is known by a former lawyer who worked for Belmont.

Blake's secretary Joyce Kingston gets involved in directly helping Blake thwart Belmont, at one point battling Rita Parker for control of a truck carrying stolen payroll money. Blake eventually captures Matt Farrell but Belmont and Parker kidnap Joyce and they offer to trade her for Farrell. Blake is able to trace Belmont to his hidden lair beneath a theatre and winds up battling him high up on a catwalk overlooking a precipitous drop.

== Cast ==
- Marten Lamont as Jerry Blake, Federal Operator 99
- Helen Talbot as Joyce Kingston
- George J. Lewis as Jim Belmont, a sophisticated villain
- Lorna Gray as Rita Parker, Belmont's partner in crime
- Hal Taliaferro as Matt Farrell
- LeRoy Mason as Morton, henchman
- Bill Stevens as Agent Fred Martin
- Maurice Cass as Signor Giuseppe Morello
- Kernan Cripps as Agent Thomas Jeffries
- Elaine Lange as Countess Delremy
- Frank Jaquet as Warren Hunter
- Forrest Taylor as Otto Wolfe
- Jay Novello as Heinrick
- Tom London as Prof. Crawford
- Jack Ingram as Riggs

=== Cast Notes ===
Cline writes that this was a "somewhat uncharacteristic" serial for Republic due to its sophisticated villains, Lewis the frustrated pianist and his "confidant" (Cline's quotes) played by Gray, and an "obviously cultured, polished hero."

== Production ==
Federal Operator 99 was budgeted at $143,620 although the final negative cost was $153,737 (a $10,117, or 7%, overspend). It was the cheapest Republic serial of 1945.

It was filmed between 18 January and 14 February 1945. The serial's production number was 1497.

=== Stunts ===
- Dale Van Sickel as Jerry Blake (doubling Marten Lamont)
- Duke Green as Jim Belmont (doubling George J. Lewis)
- Tom Steele as Matt Farrell (doubling Hal Taliaferro)
- Fred Graham
- Ken Terrell

=== Special effects ===
Special effects by the Lydecker brothers.

== Release ==
=== Theatrical ===
Federal Operator 99's official release date is 7 July 1945, although this is actually the date the sixth chapter was made available to film exchanges.

The serial was re-released on 8 October 1956 between the similar re-releases of King of the Rocket Men and Dangers of the Canadian Mounted. The last original Republic serial release was King of the Carnival in 1955.

=== Television ===
Federal Operator 99 was one of twenty-six Republic serials re-released as a film on television in 1966. The title of the film was changed to FBI-99. This version was cut down to 100-minutes in length.

== Chapter titles ==
1. The Case of the Crown Jewels (22min 8s)
2. The Case of the Stolen Ransom (13min 20s)
3. The Case of the Lawful Counterfeit (13min 20s)
4. The Case of the Telephone Code (13min 20s)
5. The Case of the Missing Expert (13min 20s)
6. The Case of the Double Trap (13min 20s)
7. The Case of the Golden Car (13min 20s)
8. The Case of the Invulnerable Criminal (13min 20s) - a re-cap chapter
9. The Case of the Torn Blueprint (13min 20s)
10. The Case of the Hidden Witness (13min 20s)
11. The Case of the Stradivarius (13min 20s)
12. The Case of the Musical Clue (13min 20s)

_{Source:}

== See also ==
- List of film serials by year
- List of film serials by studio
