= Helen Talbot =

American actress (1924–2010)

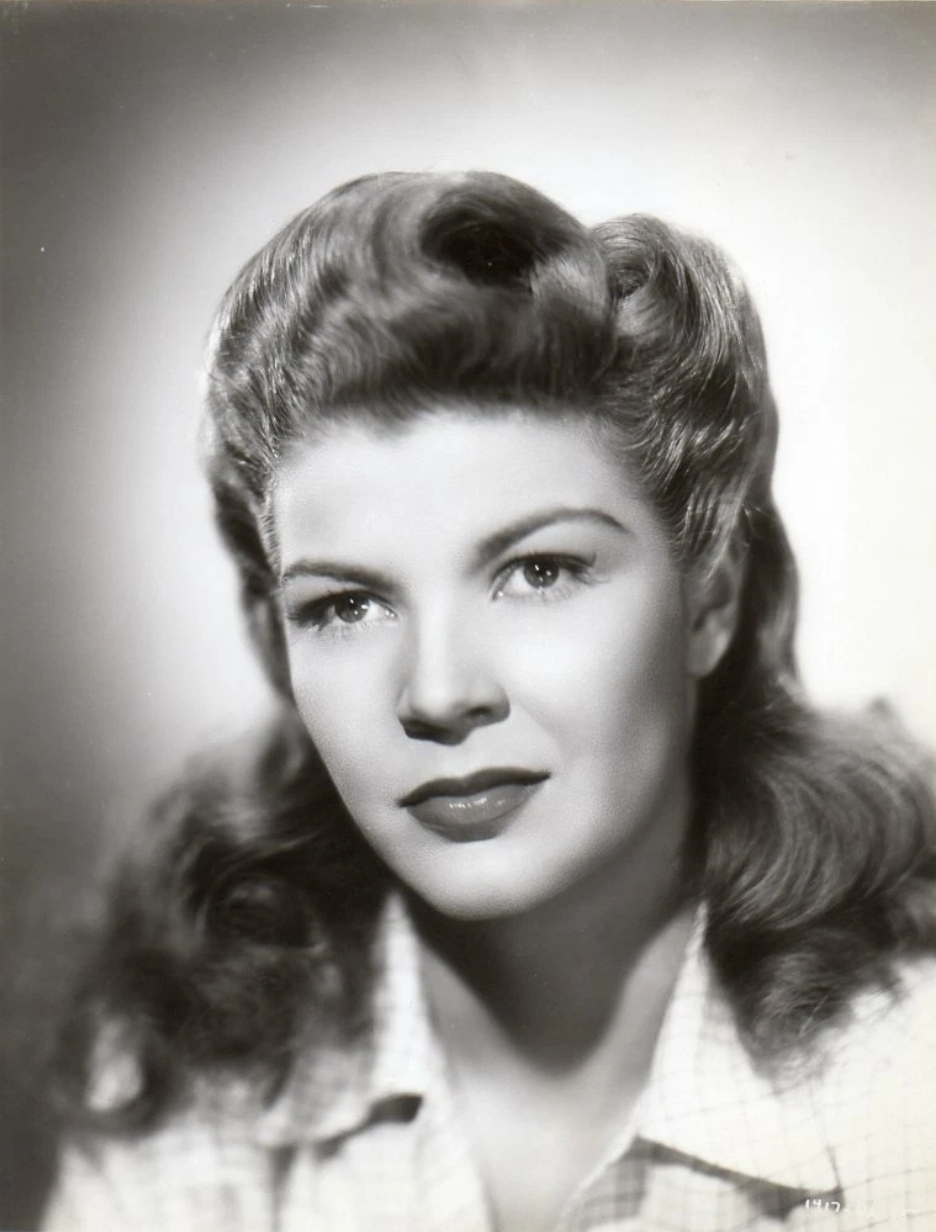
- Talbot in 1945
- Born: Helen Darling; April 7, 1924; Concordia, Kansas, U.S.
- Died: January 29, 2010 (aged 85)
- Occupation: Actress
- Years active: 1943–1946

Helen Talbot (April 7, 1924 – January 29, 2010) was an American actor and pin-up girl in the United States. She was born Helen Darling in Concordia, Kansas and lived there until 1941 when she moved to live with her brother in West Los Angeles, California.

== Career ==
During World War II, Talbot joined a USO-Camp Shows tour in the Southwest Pacific, entertaining American servicemen in Australia and New Guinea. In a lighthearted gesture by one service unit, she was named "Miss Palmyra Island of 1944," reflecting the troops' appreciation.

Talbot starred in at least 23 films and television projects, including a number of westerns as a leading lady. Her appearances include King of the Forest Rangers, Corpus Christi Bandits, and Trail of Kit Carson. She also had a lead role in Federal Operator 99.

== Partial filmography ==
- Pistol Packin' Mama (1943)
- California Joe (1943)
- Canyon City (1943)
- Outlaws of Santa Fe (1944)
- Faces in the Fog (1944)
- Corpus Christi Bandits (1945)
- Lone Texas Ranger (1945)
- Federal Operator 99 (1945)
- Trail of Kit Carson (1945)
- King of the Forest Rangers (1946)
