= Ghost Town Law =

1942 film directed by Howard Bretherton

- Theatrical release poster
- Directed by: Howard Bretherton
- Screenplay by: Adele Buffington
- Produced by: Scott R. Dunlap
- Starring: Buck Jones; Tim McCoy; Raymond Hatton; Virginia Carpenter; Murdock MacQuarrie; Charles King
- Cinematography: Harry Neumann
- Edited by: Carl Pierson
- Production company: Monogram Pictures
- Distributed by: Monogram Pictures
- Release date: March 27, 1942
- Running time: 62 minutes
- Country: United States
- Language: English

Ghost Town Law is a 1942 American Western film directed by Howard Bretherton and written by Adele Buffington. This is the fifth film in Monogram Pictures' Rough Riders series, and stars Buck Jones as Marshal Buck Roberts, Tim McCoy as Marshal Tim McCall and Raymond Hatton as Marshal Sandy Hopkins, with Virginia Carpenter, Murdock MacQuarrie and Charles King. The film was released on March 27, 1942.

== Cast ==
- Buck Jones as Buck Roberts
- Tim McCoy as Tim McCall
- Raymond Hatton as Sandy Hopkins
- Virginia Carpenter as Josie Hall
- Murdock MacQuarrie as Judge Crail
- Charles King as Gus
- Tom London as Ace
- Howard Masters as Tom Cook
- Ben Corbett as Red Larkin
- Silver as Silver
