= Howard Bretherton =

American film director (1890–1969)

- Born: February 13, 1890; Tacoma, Washington, U.S.
- Died: April 12, 1969 (aged 79); San Diego, California, U.S.
- Occupations: Film director, editor
- Children: David Bretherton

Howard Bretherton (13 February 1890 – 12 April 1969) was an American film director and editor.

== Career ==
He began his career as a propman and then became a film editor during the early 1920s for MGM. He directed his first film, While London Sleeps, in 1926, and thereafter spent more than three decades working mostly as a film director. Of the roughly 100 pictures he directed, most of them were westerns and action/adventure films. The final film he directed was Night Raiders in 1952. Afterwards, he occasionally worked as a director in television through 1958.

== Filmography ==
=== As director ===
- While London Sleeps (1926)
- Hills of Kentucky (1927)
- The Black Diamond Express (1927)
- The Bush Leaguer (1927)
- One-Round Hogan (1927)
- The Silver Slave (1927)
- Across the Atlantic (1928)
- Turn Back the Hours (1928)
- The Chorus Kid (1928)
- Caught in the Fog (1928)
- The Greyhound Limited (1929)
- The Redeeming Sin (1929)
- From Headquarters (1929)
- The Time, the Place and the Girl (1929)
- The Argyle Case (1929)
- Second Choice (1930)
- Isle of Escape (1930)
- The Match King (1932)
- Ladies They Talk About (1933)
- Return of the Terror (1934)
- The Singer of Naples (1935)
- Dinky (1935)
- Hop-Along Cassidy (1935)
- The Eagle's Brood (1935)
- Bar 20 Rides Again (1935)
- The Leathernecks Have Landed (1936)
- Heart of the West (1936)
- Call of the Prairie (1936)
- Three on the Trail (1936)
- The Girl from Mandalay (1936)
- King of the Royal Mounted (1936)
- Wild Brian Kent (1936)
- Secret Valley (1937)
- It Happened Out West (1937)
- Western Gold (1937)
- County Fair (1937)
- Wanted by the Police (1938)
- Tough Kid (1938)
- Navy Secrets (1939)
- Star Reporter (1939)
- Undercover Agent (1939)
- Boys' Reformatory (1939)
- Irish Luck (1939)
- Sky Patrol (1939)
- Danger Flight (1939)
- Hidden Enemy (1940)
- Chasing Trouble (1940)
- The Showdown (1940)
- Midnight Limited (1940)
- On the Spot (1940)
- Laughing at Danger (1940)
- Up in the Air (1940)
- You're Out of Luck (1941)
- In Old Colorado (1941)
- Sign of the Wolf (1941)
- Twilight on the Trail (1941)
- Outlaws of the Desert (1941)
- Riders of the Badlands (1941)
- West of Tombstone (1942)
- Below the Border (1942)
- Ghost Town Law (1942)
- Down Texas Way (1942)
- Riders of the West (1942)
- West of the Law (1942)
- Pirates of the Prairie (1942)
- Rhythm Parade (1942)
- Dawn on the Great Divide (1942)
- Carson City Cyclone (1943)
- Santa Fe Scouts (1943)
- Riders of the Rio Grande (1943)
- Bordertown Gun Fighters (1943)
- Fugitive from Sonora (1943)
- Wagon Tracks West (1943)
- Beyond the Last Frontier (1943)
- The Man from the Rio Grande (1943)
- Whispering Footsteps (1943)
- Hidden Valley Outlaws (1944)
- Outlaws of Santa Fe (1944)
- The Girl Who Dared (1944)
- The San Antonio Kid (1944)
- Law of the Valley (1944)
- The Navajo Trail (1945)
- The Big Show-Off (1945)
- The Topeka Terror (1945)
- Gun Smoke (1945)
- The Monster and the Ape (1945)
- Renegades of the Rio Grande (1945)
- Who's Guilty? (1945)
- The Trap (1946)
- Ridin' Down the Trail (1947)
- Trail of the Mounties (1947)
- The Prince of Thieves (1948)
- Triggerman (1948)
- The Story of Birth (1948)
- Because of Eve (1948)
- Night Raiders (1952)

==== Short films ====
- More Sinned Against Than Usual (1930)
- A Matter of Ethics (1930)
- Model Women (1930)
- In Again, Out Again (1930)
- It's All Over (1930)
- Pulling a Bone (1931)
- Laugh It Off (1931)
- The Headache (1931)
- All for the Band (1931)
- Once Over, Light (1931)
- Thou Shalt Not (1931)
- The S.S. Malaria (1931)
- Via Express (1931)
- Cheaper to Rent (1931)
- Easy to Get (1931)
- Stop That Run (1932)
- Good Badminton (1934)
- Here Comes the Circus (1946)
- Where the North Begins (1947)

=== As editor ===
- One Week of Love (1922)
- Children of Dust (1923)
- Beau Brummel (1924)
- A Self-Made Failure (1924)
- A Successful Calamity (1932)
- Heroes for Sale (1933)
- Baby Face (1933)
- The House on 56th Street (1933)
- Heat Lightning (1934)
- Smarty (1934) (uncredited)

=== As associate producer ===
- Identity Unknown (1945)
