= Wally Vernon =

American actor and dancer (1905–1960)

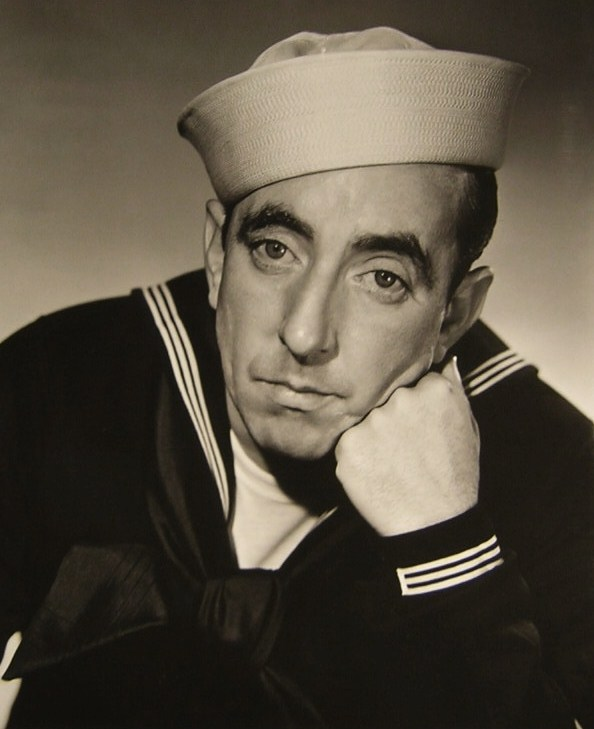
- Vernon in Sailor's Lady (1940)
- Born: Walter J. Vernon; May 27, 1905; New York City, U.S.
- Died: March 27, 1970 (aged 64); Hollywood, California, U.S.
- Resting place: Forest Lawn Memorial Park, Hollywood Hills, California
- Occupations: Actor, dancer
- Years active: 1937–1964

Walter J. Vernon (May 27, 1905 – March 7, 1970) was an American comic and character actor and dancer.

== Early life ==
Vernon was born in New York City in 1905. He was in show business from the age of three, appearing in vaudeville and stock theater; he made his first Hollywood appearance in 1937's Mountain Music.

== Career ==
He made more than 75 films, almost always playing a Brooklynese wiseguy and/or the hero's assistant. He was a fixture in Twentieth Century Fox features of the late 1930s and early 1940s; Vernon is seen as an eccentric dancer in Fox's Alexander's Ragtime Band (1938), where he appears as himself.

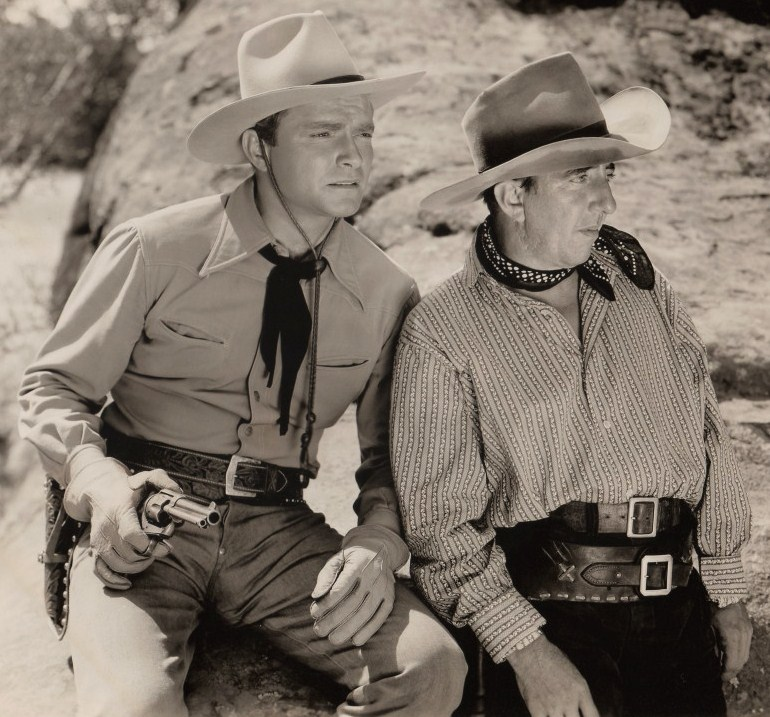
Don "Red" Barry and Wally Vernon in The Man from the Rio Grande (1943)

Vernon freelanced at other studios after leaving Fox. He became the sidekick to cowboy star Don "Red" Barry at Republic Pictures, and when Barry began producing his own features in 1949, he remembered Vernon and brought him back as his sidekick.

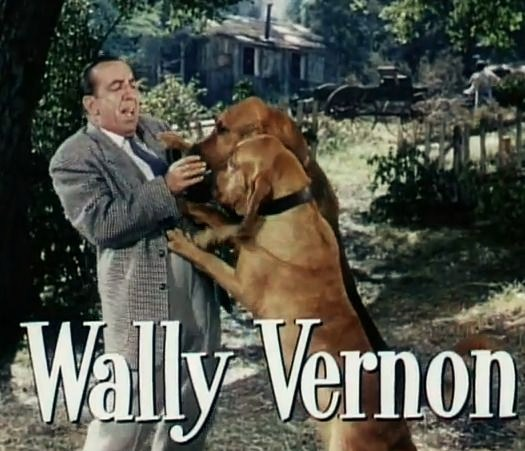
Trailer for Bloodhounds of Broadway (1952)

In 1948 Columbia Pictures producer Jules White paired Vernon with Eddie Quillan, another comedian with a vaudeville background. White emphasized physical comedy in films, and Vernon and Quillan indulged in pratfalling, head-banging, kick-in-the-pants slapstick. The Vernon & Quillan comedies were favorites of White, who kept making them through 1956.

In 1961, he appeared as a bartender in the TV Western series Bat Masterson (S3E18 "The Prescott Campaign").

== Death ==
On March 7, 1970, Vernon died in an ambulance shortly after being struck by a hit-and-run driver in Hollywood, California. He was buried in Hollywood Hills at Forest Lawn Cemetery.

== Films ==
- Mountain Music (1937) - Odette Potta
- You Can't Have Everything (1937) - Jerry
- This Way Please (1937) - Bumps
- Submarine D-1 (1937) - Sailor (uncredited)
- Happy Landing (1938) - Al Mahoney
- Kentucky Moonshine (1938) - Gus Bryce
- Alexander's Ragtime Band (1938) - Wally Vernon
- Meet the Girls (1938) - Delbert Jones
- Sharpshooters (1938) - Waldo
- Tail Spin (1939) - Chick
- Broadway Serenade (1939) - Joey - the Jinx
- Chasing Danger (1939) - Waldo Winkle [AFI Name: Waldo Rohrbeck]
- The Gorilla (1939) - Seaman
- Charlie Chan at Treasure Island (1939) - Elmer Kelner
- Sailor's Lady (1940) - Goofer
- Margie (1940) - Al
- Sandy Gets Her Man (1940) - Fireman Bagshaw
- Reveille with Beverly (1943) - Stomp McCoy
- Hit Parade of 1943 (1943) - Vaudeville Actor (uncredited)
- Tahiti Honey (1943) - Maxie
- Get Going (1943) - Comic Bit
- Fugitive from Sonora (1943) - Jack Pot Murphy
- Thumbs Up (1943) - Comedy Trio Member (uncredited)
- Black Hills Express (1943) - Deputy Deadeye
- A Scream in the Dark (1943) - Klousky
- The Man from the Rio Grande (1943) - Jimpson Simpson
- Here Comes Elmer (1943) - Wally
- Canyon City (1943) - Beauty Bradshaw
- Pistol Packin' Mama (1943) - The Joker
- California Joe (1943) - Tumbleweed Smith
- Outlaws of Santa Fe (1944) - Buckshot Peters
- Call of the South Seas (1944) - Handsome
- Silent Partner (1944) - Room Service Waiter
- Silver City Kid (1944) - Wildcat Higgens
- Stagecoach to Monterey (1944) - Throckmorton 'Other-Hand' Snodgrass
- Joe Palooka in Fighting Mad (1948) - Archie Stone
- King of the Gamblers (1948) - Mike Burns
- Behind Locked Doors (1948) - Maintenance Man (uncredited)
- Joe Palooka in Winner Take All (1948) - Taxi Driver
- He Walked by Night (1948) - Postman (uncredited)
- The Lucky Stiff (1949) - Card Player (uncredited)
- Square Dance Jubilee (1949) - Seldom Sam Jenks
- Always Leave Them Laughing (1949) - Wally Vernon - Comic
- Beauty on Parade (1950) - Sam Short
- I Shot Billy the Kid (1950) - Vicente
- Gunfire (1950) - Clem
- Train to Tombstone (1950) - Clifton Gulliver
- Border Rangers (1950) - Hungry Hicks
- Holiday Rhythm (1950) - Klaxon
- What Price Glory? (1952) - Lipinsky
- Bloodhounds of Broadway (1952) - Harry 'Poorly' Sammis
- Affair with a Stranger (1953) - Joe, Taxi Driver
- Fury at Gunsight Pass (1956) - Okay, Okay a.k.a. Johnny Oakes
- The White Squaw (1956) - Faro Bill
- What a Way to Go! (1964) - Agent
