= Chief Tahachee =

American actor, author

- Born: March 4, 1904; James Mill, Arkansas, U.S.
- Died: June 9, 1978 (aged 74); San Gabriel, California, U.S.
- Resting place: Forest Lawn Memorial Park, Covina Hills, Covina, California
- Occupations: Actor, author

Chief Tahachee (born Jeff Davis "Tahchee" Cypert, March 4, 1904 – June 9, 1978) was a writer, a stage actor, a film extra, and a vaudeville performer. He claimed to be a descendant of the Old Settler Cherokees.

== Career ==
Chief Tahachee wrote four books: Poems of Dreams (1942), Drifting Sands (1950), An American Indian Climb Toward Truth & Wisdom (1955), and The Rough and Rowdy Ways of an American Indian Cowboy (1957). Poems of Dreams was his most popular and he renewed the copyright on it October 1972.

Chief Tahachee was an actor, stuntman and film extra in many Hollywood films produced from the 1920s to the 1960s, including westerns, film noir, drama, and historical sagas. His first film appearance was in a silent film, The Last of the Mohicans, in 1920 at the age of 16.

Tahachee was married to poet and Hollywood film extra Dorothy Lear Evelyn Teters Cypert "Nawana" Yarbrough, who also went by "Princess Neowana." After their divorce married six more times, he fathered ten children. He died June 9, 1978, in San Gabriel, California of a heart attack.
