= California Joe (film) =

1943 film by Spencer Gordon Bennet

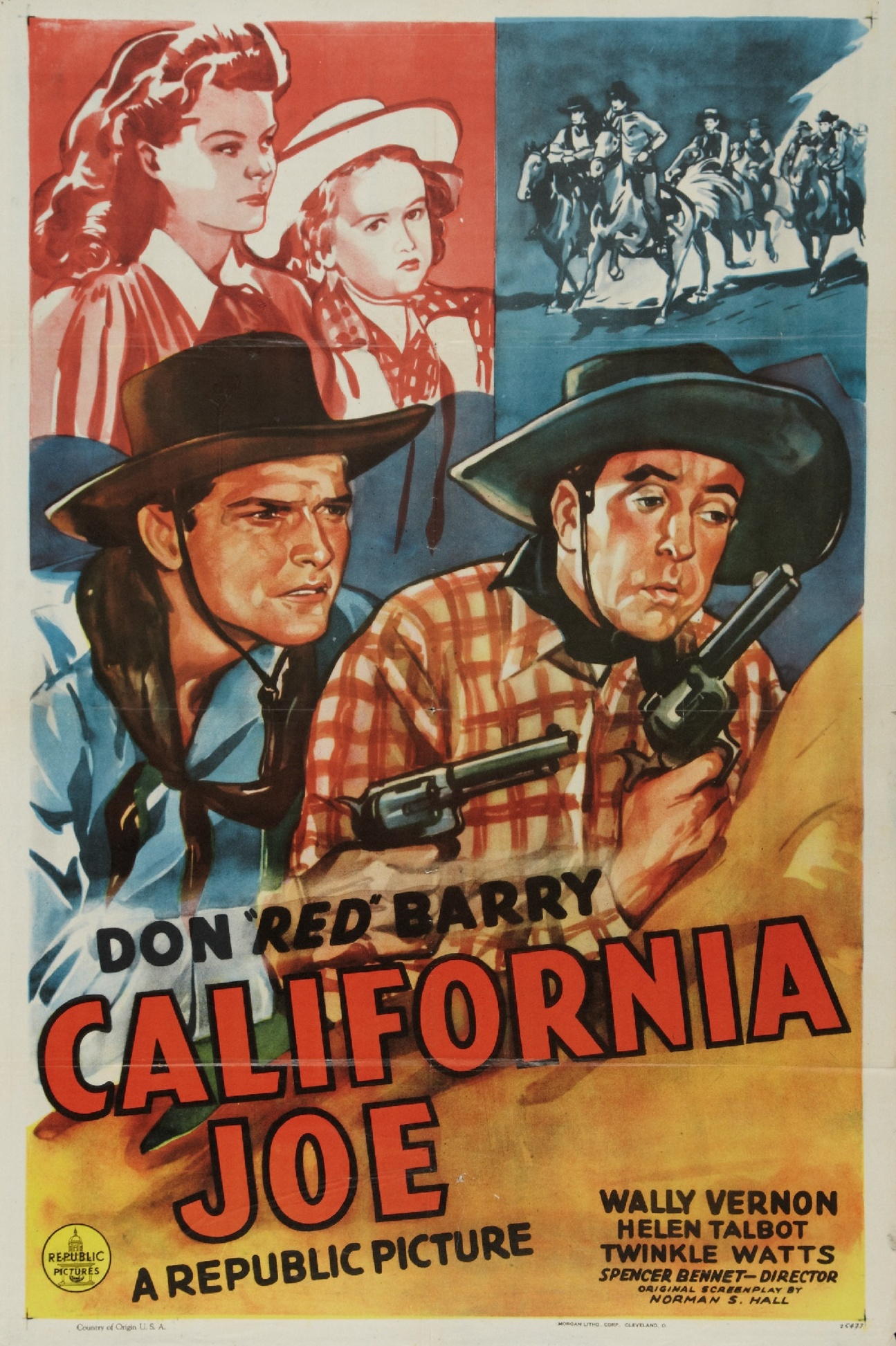
- Theatrical release poster
- Directed by: Spencer Gordon Bennet
- Screenplay by: Norman S. Hall
- Produced by: Edward J. White
- Starring: Don "Red" Barry; Wally Vernon; Helen Talbot; Twinkle Watts; Brian O'Hara; Terry Frost
- Cinematography: Ernest Miller
- Edited by: Harry Keller
- Music by: Mort Glickman
- Production company: Republic Pictures
- Distributed by: Republic Pictures
- Release date: December 29, 1943
- Running time: 55 minutes
- Country: United States
- Language: English

California Joe is a 1943 American Western film directed by Spencer Gordon Bennet and written by Norman S. Hall. The film stars Don "Red" Barry, Wally Vernon, Helen Talbot, Twinkle Watts, Brian O'Hara and Terry Frost. The film was released on December 29, 1943, by Republic Pictures.

== Cast ==
- Don "Red" Barry as Lieutenant Joe Weldon
- Wally Vernon as "Tumbleweed" Smith
- Helen Talbot as Judith Carteret
- Twinkle Watts as "Twinkle" Potter
- Brian O'Hara as Delancey Carteret
- Terry Frost as Tommy "Melborne Tommy" Atkinson
- LeRoy Mason as Breck Colton
- Edward Earle as Colonel Burgess
- Charles King as Ashley, Henchman
- Pierce Lyden as Harper, Henchman
- Edmund Cobb as Henchman
- Karl Hackett as Telegrapher Potter
- Bob Kortman as Henchman
