= Faces in the Fog =

1944 film by John English

- Directed by: John English
- Written by: Adelaide Heilbron; Jack Townley
- Produced by: Herman Millakowsky
- Starring: Jane Withers; Paul Kelly; Lee Patrick; John Litel; Eric Sinclair; Dorothy Peterson; Gertrude Michael; H.B. Warner
- Cinematography: Reggie Lanning
- Edited by: Tony Martinelli
- Music by: Joseph Dubin
- Production company: Republic Pictures
- Distributed by: Republic Pictures
- Release date: November 30, 1944
- Running time: 71 minutes
- Country: United States
- Language: English

Faces in the Fog is a 1944 American drama film directed by John English and starring Jane Withers, Paul Kelly and Lee Patrick.

== Plot ==
Hard-partying Tom and Cora Elliott neglect their kids, 17-year-old Mary and 14-year-old Les. This worries their neighbor. Dr. Fred Mason.

At the urging of older boy Mike, Les sneaks a gun out of his dad's home and goes to a party at Dr. Mason's house, where Mary is flirting with 18-year-old Joe Mason. Mike accidentally shoots Les, who is only grazed. Another boy at the party tells the police about the incident. Tom believes Dr. Mason informed the cops, and is furious. He demands that Mary stop seeing Joe. Mary and Joe conspire to attend a school dance with other dates, but spend the night dancing. The two argue, and Mary leaves with Mike. The drunken Mike strikes a pedestrian with his car. Joe takes the injured man to the hospital, and is blamed for the accident.

Joe decides to enlist in the army. Realizing their fight was silly, Mary elopes with him. A jealous Mike sees them spending the night at a motel, and tells Mary's dad, Tom. Tom rushes to the motel and shoots Joe. Tom is acquitted for "defending his daughter's honor". Mary reveals that she and Joe are married. Mary and Joe are allowed to spend a week on a honeymoon before Mary faces a perjury trial for her various lies.

== Partial cast ==
- Jane Withers as Mary Elliott
- Paul Kelly as Tom Elliott
- Lee Patrick as Cora Elliott
- John Litel as Dr. Mason
- Eric Sinclair as Joe Mason
- Dorothy Peterson as Mrs. Mason
- Gertrude Michael as Nora Brooks
- H.B. Warner as Defense Attorney Rankins
- Richard Byron as Mike
- Roger Clark as Sgt. O'Donnell
- Adele Mara as Gertrude
- Bob Stebbins as Les Elliott
- Charles Trowbridge as Mr. White
- Helen Talbot as Alice
- Joel McGinnis as Danny
- Tom London as Auto Court Manager
- Emmett Vogan as Capt. Roberts

== See also ==
- List of American films of 1944

== Bibliography ==
- Clifford McCarty. Film Composers in America: A Filmography, 1911-1970. Oxford University Press, 2000.
