= Canyon City (1943 film) =

1943 film

- Directed by: Spencer Gordon Bennet
- Written by: Robert Yost
- Produced by: Edward J. White
- Starring: Don 'Red' Barry; Wally Vernon; Helen Talbot
- Cinematography: John MacBurnie
- Edited by: Harry Keller
- Music by: Mort Glickman
- Production company: Republic Pictures
- Distributed by: Republic Pictures
- Release date: November 24, 1943
- Running time: 57 minutes
- Country: United States
- Language: English

Canyon City is a 1943 American Western film directed by Spencer Gordon Bennet and starring Don 'Red' Barry, Wally Vernon and Helen Talbot.

== Cast ==
- Don 'Red' Barry as Terry Reynolds - posing as the Nevada Kid
- Wally Vernon as Beauty Bradshaw
- Helen Talbot as Edith Gleason
- Twinkle Watts as Twinkle Hardy
- Morgan Conway as Craig Morgan
- Emmett Vogan as Emerson Wheeler
- Stanley Andrews as Johnson - Water Co. President
- Roy Barcroft as Jeff Parker
- LeRoy Mason as Webb Hepburn
- Pierce Lyden as Mac - Henchman
- Forbes Murray as Judge Gleason
- Edward Peil Sr. as Jim Hardy
- Eddie Gribbon as Deputy Frank

== Bibliography ==
- Len D. Martin. The Republic Pictures Checklist: Features, Serials, Cartoons, Short Subjects and Training Films of Republic Pictures Corporation, 1935-1959. McFarland, 1998.
