= Hidden Valley Outlaws =

1944 film by Howard Bretherton

- Theatrical release poster
- Directed by: Howard Bretherton
- Screenplay by: John K. Butler; Robert Creighton Williams
- Story by: John K. Butler
- Produced by: Louis Gray
- Starring: Wild Bill Elliott; George "Gabby" Hayes; Anne Jeffreys; Roy Barcroft; Kenne Duncan; Charles Miller
- Cinematography: Reggie Lanning
- Edited by: Tony Martinelli
- Music by: Mort Glickman
- Production company: Republic Pictures
- Distributed by: Republic Pictures
- Release date: April 2, 1944
- Running time: 56 minutes
- Country: United States
- Language: English

Hidden Valley Outlaws is a 1944 American Western film directed by Howard Bretherton and written by John K. Butler and Robert Creighton Williams. The film stars Wild Bill Elliott, George "Gabby" Hayes, Anne Jeffreys, Roy Barcroft, Kenne Duncan and Charles Miller. The film was released on April 2, 1944, by Republic Pictures.

== Cast ==
- Wild Bill Elliott as Bill Elliott
- George "Gabby" Hayes as Gabby Hayes
- Anne Jeffreys as June Clark
- Roy Barcroft as Gilbert J. Leland
- Kenne Duncan as Henchman Ben Bannon
- Charles Miller as Daniel Clark
- John James as Danny Clark
- Fred Toones as Snowflake
- Budd Buster as Ned Murphy
- Tom London as Sheriff McBride
- LeRoy Mason as The Whistler
- Earle Hodgins as Eddie Purcell
- Yakima Canutt as Vigilante Tracy

== Production ==
=== Filming locations ===
Hidden Valley Outlaws was filmed in Iverson and Corriganville Movie Ranch in California.
