= Twilight on the Rio Grande =

1947 film by Frank McDonald

- Theatrical release poster
- Directed by: Frank McDonald
- Screenplay by: Dorrell McGowan; Stuart E. McGowan
- Produced by: Armand Schaefer
- Starring: Gene Autry; Sterling Holloway; Adele Mara; Bob Steele; Charles Evans; Martin Garralaga
- Cinematography: William Bradford
- Edited by: Harry Keller
- Production company: Republic Pictures
- Distributed by: Republic Pictures
- Release date: April 1, 1947
- Running time: 71 minutes
- Country: United States
- Language: English

Twilight on the Rio Grande is a 1947 American Western film directed by Frank McDonald, written by Dorrell McGowan and Stuart E. McGowan, and starring Gene Autry, Sterling Holloway, Adele Mara, Bob Steele, Charles Evans and Martin Garralaga. It was released on April 1, 1947, by Republic Pictures.

== Plot ==
Gene Autry, starring in his own name, visits a Mexican border town with some of his ranch hands, to attend a carnival. Dusty, one of the ranch hands, falls victim to a jewelry smuggling operation and is murdered in the process. Gene soon learns that one of the town’s attorneys, Henry Blackstone, is masterminding the smuggling operation. Gene breaks into Blackstone's office one night looking for evidence, but Blackstone and his men surprise him and then attempt to frame him as a burglar. Gene is fortunate that the local police are also investigating the smuggling racket and let him go. After an attempt by Blackstone’s men to kill an insurance investigator who is working with the local police, Gene discovers that Blackstone and his men are trying to smuggle more jewelry into the United States via an ambulance. Gene intercepts the ambulance and kills Blackstone in an ensuing gun fight.

== Cast ==
- Gene Autry as Gene Autry
- Sterling Holloway as Pokie
- Adele Mara as Elena Del Rio
- Bob Steele as Dusty Morgan
- Charles Evans as Henry Blackstone
- Martin Garralaga as Mucho the Woodchopper
- Howard Negley as Jake
- George J. Lewis as Captain Gonzáles
- Nacho Galindo as Torres
- Tex Terry as Henchman Joe
- The Cass County Boys as Musicians

== Reception ==
The film was included in the 1978 book, The Fifty Worst Films of All Time (and How They Got That Way), by Harry Medved, Randy Dreyfuss, and Michael Medved.
