= Stephen Auer =

Hungarian-born American film producer (1900-1954)

- Born: October 4, 1900; Budapest, Austro-Hungarian Empire
- Died: February 13, 1954 (aged 53); Beverly Hills, California; United States
- Occupation: Producer
- Years active: 1944–1952 (film)

Stephen Auer (October 4, 1900 – February 13, 1954) was a Hungarian-born American film producer.

== Selected filmography ==
- The San Antonio Kid (1944)
- Sheriff of Las Vegas (1944)
- Trail of Kit Carson (1945)
- The Madonna's Secret (1946)
- Madonna of the Desert (1948)
- King of the Gamblers (1948)
- Rose of the Yukon (1949)
- Duke of Chicago (1949)
- Trial Without Jury (1950)
- Million Dollar Pursuit (1951)
- Woman in the Dark (1952)

== Bibliography ==
- Len D. Martin. The Republic Pictures Checklist: Features, Serials, Cartoons, Short Subjects and Training Films of Republic Pictures Corporation, 1935-1959. McFarland, 1998.
