= Norman S. Hall =

American screenwriter (1895–1964)

- Born: July 21, 1895; New Milford, Connecticut
- Died: December 12, 1964 (aged 69); Los Angeles, California
- Occupation: Screenwriter

Norman S. Hall (July 21, 1895 – 12 December 1964) was an American screenwriter from the 1930s to the 1960s.

Hall was born in New Milford, Connecticut and died in Los Angeles, California.

== Selected filmography ==
- Outlaws of Pine Ridge (1942)
- Black Hills Express (1943)
- Days of Old Cheyenne (1943)
- Sheriff of Sundown (1944)
- Rio Grande Raiders (1946)
