= List of films shot in Thousand Oaks =

This is an incomplete list of films shot in City of Thousand Oaks in the U.S. state of California.

Several productions made use of the unusual appearance of the old Thousand Oaks Civic Center. It was the building that housed Proteus IV in the 1977 movie 'Demon Seed', and the bunker Steve Austin crossed a mine field to reach in a Season 2 episode of 'The Six Million Dollar Man' called 'The Return of the Robot Maker'.

== Films ==
Film title	Year released	Location(s) used	Ref(s)
Spartacus	1960	California Lutheran University	
Welcome to Hard Times	1967	California Lutheran University; Wildwood Regional Park	
Hollywood or Bust	1956	Live Oak Street	
It Happened One Night	1934	Thousand Oaks Boulevard	
Wuthering Heights	1939	Wildwood Regional Park; California Lutheran University	
Dodge City	1939	Wildwood Regional Park	
The Rifleman	1958-63	Wildwood Regional Park	
Davy Crockett, King of the Wild Frontier	1955	Wildwood Regional Park	
The Grapes of Wrath	1940	Wildwood Regional Park	
We Bought a Zoo	2011	Greenfield Ranch	
It's Complicated	2009	Hidden Valley	
True Blood	2008-2014	Greenfield Ranch; JMJ Ranch	
Monk	2002-2009	Greenfield Ranch	
Bones	2005-2017	Greenfield Ranch; JMJ Ranch	
Criminal Minds	2005-	Greenfield Ranch	
Memoirs of a Geisha	2005		
Come On, Tarzan	1932	Hidden Valley	
The Dukes of Hazzard	1979-85	Hidden Valley	
Texas Across the River	1966	North Ranch	
The New Adventures of Tarzan	1935	Jungleland USA	
Doctor Dolittle	1967	Jungleland USA	
Poltergeist	1982	Holiday Inn	
Hondo and the Apaches	1967	Metro Goldwyn Mayer Ranch	
Fury	1955-1960	Jungleland USA	
The Adventures of Robin Hood	1938	Jungleland USA	
The Birth of a Nation	1915	Jungleland USA	
The Paleface	1948	Conejo Valley Airport; Deerwood Stock Farm	
Riders of the Whistling Pines	1949	Conejo Valley Airport; Wildwood Regional Park	
It's a Mad, Mad, Mad, Mad World	1963	Rancho Conejo Airport	
The Ballad of Josie	1968	North Ranch; Wildwood Regional Park	
Firecreek	1968	North Ranch	
Rainbow Over Texas	1946	Hidden Valley (426 W. Potrero Road)	
Trail to San Antone	1947	Deerwood Stock Farm	
Down Argentine Way	1940	Greenfield Ranch	
The Great Man's Lady	1942	Joel McCrea Ranch, Moorpark Road	
Sleeper	1973		
Bonanza	1959-1973	Wildwood Regional Park	
Wagon Train	1940	Wildwood Regional Park	
Gunsmoke	1955–1975	Wildwood Regional Park; California Lutheran University	
Duel in the Sun	1946	Wildwood Regional Park	
The Big Valley	1965–69	Wildwood Regional Park	
Clearing the Range	1931	Wildwood Regional Park	
Flaming Frontier	1958	Wildwood Regional Park	
The Horse Soldiers	1959	Wildwood Regional Park	
Flaming Star	1960	Wildwood Regional Park	
Heart and Souls	1993	Greenfield Ranch	
Bitter Harvest	1993	Greenfield Ranch	
Lassie Come Home	1943	Hidden Valley; Wildwood Regional Park	
To the Shores of Iwo Jima	1945	Wildwood Regional Park	
The Guns of Will Sonnett	1967-69	Wildwood Regional Park	
Bedtime Stories	2008	Newbury Park	
In Old Kentucky	1935	Deerwood Stock Farm; Borchard Ranch	
Westworld	2016	Ventura Farms	
Under Fiesta Stars	1941	Deerwood Stock Farm	
San Fernando Valley	1944	Deerwood Stock Farm	
My Pal Trigger	1946	Deerwood Stock Farm	
Never a Dull Moment	1950	Deerwood Stock Farm	
Sons of New Mexico	1950	Deerwood Stock Farm	
Dynasty	1981-89	JMJ Ranch	
Teen Wolf	2011-	JMJ Ranch	
Dallas	1978-1991	JMJ Ranch	
Walk on the Wild Side	1962	Thousand Oaks Meat Locker	
Wichita	1955		
The Bridges at Toko-Ri	1954	Thousand Oaks Ranch	
The Gay Ranchero	1948	Wildwood Regional Park	
Gunsight Ridge	1957	Wildwood Regional Park	
The Ride Back	1957	Wildwood Regional Park	
Westward Ho the Wagons!	1957	Wildwood Regional Park	
The Left Handed Gun	1958	Wildwood Regional Park	
Wild Heritage	1958	Wildwood Regional Park	
Escort West	1959	Wildwood Regional Park	
American Horror Story	2011-	Hidden Valley	
Bridesmaids	2011	Sherwood Country Club	
Thelma & Louise	1991	DuPar Restaurant	
The Man Who Shot Liberty Valance	1962	Wildwood Regional Park	
Advance to the Rear	1964	Wildwood Regional Park	
Stage to Thunder Rock	1964	Wildwood Regional Park	
Shenandoah	1965	Wildwood Regional Park	
The Plainsman	1966	Wildwood Regional Park	
Click	2006		
Jason Goes to Hell: The Final Friday	1993	Tire shop	
Demolition Man	1993		
I'm No Angel	1933	Jungleland USA	
FBI: The Untold Stories	1991-93		
Robin Hood	1922	Hidden Valley	
Francis	1950	Conejo Valley Airport	
Shiner	2004		
Roaring Ranch	1930	Stagecoach Inn	
Cruel Intentions	1999		
Road to the Open	2014	Sunset Hills Country Club	
Destry Rides Again	1932	French Ranch	
Law and Lawless	1932	French Ranch	
The Last Trail	1933	French Ranch	
Rainbow Riders	1934	French Ranch	
Thunder Over Texas	1934	French Ranch	
Sunset of Power	1935	French Ranch	
The Californian	1937	French Ranch	
Cattle Raiders	1938	French Ranch	
Hawaiian Buckaroo	1938	French Ranch	
Dude Cowboy	1941	French Ranch	
Song of Nevada	1944	French Ranch	
Lights of Old Santa Fe	1944	French Ranch	
Frisco Sal	1945	French Ranch	
Don Ricardo Returns	1946	French Ranch	
Under Nevada Skies	1946	French Ranch	
The Vigilante	1947	French Ranch	
Border Outlaws	1950	French Ranch	
Man in the Saddle	1951	French Ranch	
Conquest of Cochise	1953	French Ranch	
Tall Man Riding	1955	French Ranch	
The Lone Ranger	1956	French Ranch	
Marcus Welby, M.D.	1969-1976	Newbury Park	
The Lash	1930	Russell Ranch	
Where the Action Is	1965-67	Jungleland USA	
State Fair	1945	Russell Ranch	
How the West Was Won	1962	Wildwood Regional Park	
Hop	2011		
The Biggest Loser	2004-2016	Hidden Valley; Potrero Road	
The Office	2005-2013	Baxter Way	
Beverly Hills, 90210; Episode: "Wild Horses" (1992)	1990-2000		
How Green Was My Valley	1941	Norwegian Colony	
Man Without a Star	1955		
Cattle Town	1952		
Overland Stage Raiders	1938	Conejo Valley Airport	
Lassie	1954	California Lutheran University	
Tammy and the T-Rex	1994	Newbury Park High School	
The Clonus Horror	1979	California Lutheran University	
