= Shug Fisher =

American entertainer (1907–1984)

- Fisher circa 1950
- Born: George Clinton Fisher Jr. September 26, 1907; Tabler, Indian Territory (present-day Oklahoma, U.S.)
- Died: March 16, 1984 (aged 76); Woodland Hills, Los Angeles, California, U.S.
- Other name: Leroy Fisher
- Occupations: Actor; comedian; singer; songwriter; musician
- Years active: 1931–1981
- Spouse: Peggy Summers (1935–?)

Shug Fisher (born George Clinton Fisher Jr.; September 26, 1907 – March 16, 1984) was an American character actor, singer, musician, and comedian. During his 50-year entertainment career, he performed in many Western films, often as a member of the Sons of the Pioneers in serials and in B movies starring Roy Rogers. Fisher also was cast in supporting roles on a variety of television series, although most frequently on Gunsmoke and The Beverly Hillbillies. His comic trademarks included his ability to stutter at will and his bemused facial expressions.

== Childhood and early years ==
Fisher was born in Grady County, Oklahoma, in Tabler (near Chickasha) into a farming family, the youngest of four children born to a Scots-Irish father and a Choctaw Nation mother. His mother, Emma Harkins Fisher, is listed on the Dawes Rolls as one-fourth Choctaw by blood. He gained the nickname "Shug" (short for sugar) at a young age, which he explained as, "My mama gave it to me 'cause I was such a sweet baby." In 1917, the family moved by covered wagon to Pittsburg County, Oklahoma, near Indianola. Soon thereafter, Fisher was drawn to the mandolin and the fiddle. His father refreshed his own fiddling ability and Fisher learned guitar to back him, and at age 16, he was playing with his father at local square dances. He could not afford a fiddle case. so instead protected his instrument with a pillow case tied to the saddle horn.

After watching a comedian with a traveling medicine show in 1924, he decided to pursue a career in entertainment. The following year, Fisher, his father, and a friend drove a Ford Model T to California's San Joaquin Valley, where he worked as a fruit picker, and a cable and tool dresser in oil fields. He continued to perform, playing fiddle at social events and square dances. In 1927, he was asked to appear on The Fresno Bee's radio station, KMJ, but only for the publicity. He later said, "publicity was fine, but you can't eat it...My motto was, pay me something, or I don't play."

== Los Angeles calls ==
In 1931, Tom Murray, who had recently left the Beverly Hill Billies, offered Fisher a spot with his new group, the Hollywood Hillbillies, based in Los Angeles. Fisher learned to play the bass fiddle with the group and claimed he was one of the first to play the instrument in a country band. The Hillbillies appeared on the Hollywood Breakfast Club radio show and were fairly popular around Los Angeles, but had little income to show for it.

In late 1933, Fisher and Ken Carson left the group to join several members of the Beverly Hill Billies, who had moved to San Francisco. The original group was the brainchild of the general manager of KPMC-AM, who promoted the members as authentic "hillbilly" musicians whom he had "discovered." As part of the ruse, the members always adopted hillbilly names, so Fisher became Aaron Judd and Carson was Kaleb Winbush. After a short time, Fisher returned to Los Angeles, appearing on Stuart Hamblen's Covered Wagon Jubilee program.

== Ohio Valley radio career ==
In 1935, Fisher took an extended road tour with Roy Faulkner, the Lonesome Cowboy, from XERA, a Mexican radio station across the border from Del Rio, Texas. During an appearance in Council Bluffs, Iowa, Fisher was approached by Hugh Cross to join him, under sponsorship of the Georgie Porgie Breakfast Food Company, as an act for WWVA Jamboree. Fisher agreed, and the two went to Wheeling, West Virginia. Under the moniker of Hugh and Shug's Radio Pals, a reflection of their frequent radio appearances, they performed with Mary Ann Vestes and recorded for Decca for four years, enjoying a faithful radio audience.

In 1939, the two moved to Cincinnati, Ohio, where they appeared on WLW-AM's Boone County Jamboree and where Fisher met and married Peggy Summers of Bolivar, Missouri. At the station, he also became friends with a young Merle Travis.

== Sons of the Pioneers ==
When the U.S. entered World War II in 1941, Fisher returned to Los Angeles to work in defense jobs, primarily at Lockheed Aircraft in Burbank. Art Rush, head of the Hollywood Victory Committee, requested his help arranging entertainment for defense workers during the war.

In 1943, Fisher and Ken Carson were invited to join the Sons of the Pioneers after the group's Pat Brady and Lloyd Perryman were drafted into the service. Replacing Brady as bassist and comedian, Fisher eagerly joined Carson, Tim Spencer, Bob Nolan, and Hugh and Karl Farr late that year, having appreciated the band's music and personally known its members prior to the group's inception. During this tenure, the group appeared in a string of Roy Rogers movies, recorded songs for the John Ford movies Wagon Master in 1949 and Rio Grande in 1950, and performed the theme song for The Searchers in 1956.

Fisher wrote a number of songs for the Pioneers, including "Out on The Open Range", "Ridin' Down to Santa Fe", later recorded by Merle Travis, and "Forgive and Forget". In 1946, Fisher and Travis co-wrote "Cincinnati Lou". Fisher also wrote "That's My Paradise", "I'm Not Foolin' Now", "A Million Memories", "Pooey on You, Little Darlin'", a novelty song later recorded by Ken Curtis; and "Lonesome Train Blues"; and recorded "Gooseberry Pie" using his fake stuttering as a comedy device.

Fisher left the group in early 1946 when Brady returned from the war. In 1948, Capitol Transcriptions issued the album, Cowboy Jubilee, by Shug Fisher and his Ranchmen Trio. Fisher rejoined the Pioneers in 1949 when Brady left. The highlight of this era came in 1951, when they appeared at Carnegie Hall, making them the first Western band to perform there. They were also the first to play at lavish nightclubs in Las Vegas and starred on Mutual Radio's Lucky U Ranch program. In 1953, Fisher left to join friend Ken Curtis in television and motion pictures, but again returned to the Pioneers in 1955, replacing Deuce Spriggens. He left the Pioneers for the last time in 1959, and welcomed the break to "kinda take it easy, and do a lot of hunting and fishing."

== Film and television career ==
A member of the John Ford Stock Company, Fisher had an extensive career as a character actor in Western B movies and feature films starting in 1943. Many of his early roles were as a performer with the Sons of the Pioneers in Roy Rogers' singing cowboy movies. He was also the voice of Uncle Pecos, an animated mouse, in the 1955 Tom and Jerry short, Pecos Pest, and is uncredited with the guitar improvisation on the cartoon's version of "Froggie Went a-Courtin".

Fisher also had many supporting roles during a 27-year television career. From 1955–60, he made regular appearances on ABC-TV's country music variety show, Ozark Jubilee, as a comedian and singer. Then, he joined Curtis' first-run syndicated TV adventure series, Ripcord between 1962 and 1963, portraying airplane pilot Charlie Kern. He made 22 appearances on Gunsmoke from 1962 to 1974 in various minor roles, and played Shorty Kellems in 19 episodes of The Beverly Hillbillies from 1969–70. Fisher also appeared repeatedly on Bonanza, The Virginian, Daniel Boone, and The Dukes of Hazzard.

== Death ==
Shug Fisher spent his final years living in Studio City, California. He died on March 16, 1984, after a lingering illness, with old friend Ken Curtis by his side in Woodland Hills in Los Angeles. He was buried at Forest Lawn Memorial Park.

== Filmography ==
- Swing Your Partner (1943) - Himself
- Hoosier Holiday (1943) - Himself
- Jamboree (1944) - Himself
- The Yellow Rose of Texas (1944) – Bass Player Shug (uncredited)
- Song of Nevada (1944) – Shug – Sons of the Pioneers (uncredited)
- San Fernando Valley (1944) – Bass Player – Sons of the Pioneers (uncredited)
- Lights of Old Santa Fe (1944) – Shug, Bass Player – Sons of the Pioneers (uncredited)
- Grissly's Millions (1945) – Tim (uncredited)
- Utah (1945) – Bass Player – Sons of the Pioneers (uncredited)
- Bells of Rosarita (1945) – Bass Player Shug, Sons of the Pioneers (uncredited)
- The Man from Oklahoma (1945) – 'Shug' – Member Sons of the Pioneers (uncredited)
- Along the Navajo Trail (1945) – 'Shug' – Member Sons of the Pioneers (uncredited)
- Sunset in El Dorado (1945) – Shug – Member Sons of the Pioneers (uncredited)
- Don't Fence Me In (1945) – Shug – Bass Player – Sons of the Pioneers (uncredited)
- Song of Arizona (1946) – Shug – Sons of the Pioneers (uncredited)
- Ding Dong Williams (1946) – 'Shug' – Member Sons of the Pioneers (uncredited)
- Home on the Range (1946) – Shug- Member Sons of the Pioneers (uncredited)
- Rainbow Over Texas (1946) – Bass Player (uncredited)
- My Pal Trigger (1946) – Shug – Member Sons of the Pioneers (uncredited)
- Under Nevada Skies (1946) – Bass Player
- Roll on Texas Moon (1946) – Bass Player – Sons of the Pioneers (uncredited)
- Heldorado (1946) – Stable Foreman (uncredited)
- Springtime in the Sierras (1947) – Shug – Member of Sons of the Pioneers (uncredited)
- On the Old Spanish Trail (1947) – Spectator (uncredited)
- The Last Round-Up (1947) – Marvin (uncredited)
- Susanna Pass (1949) – Jailbird with Guitar (uncredited)
- Riders of the Pony Express (1949) – 'Doc' Baker
- Stallion Canyon (1949) – Red
- Everybody's Dancin' (1950) – 'Shug' – Member Sons of the Pioneers
- Rio Grande (1950) – Regimental Singer / Bugler (uncredited)
- Silver City Bonanza (1951) – Bassist (uncredited)
- Fighting Coast Guard (1951) – 'Shug' – Member Sons of the Pioneers
- Mister Roberts (1955) – Johnson
- Pecos Pest (1955, Short) uncredited, voice of Uncle Pecos and music solos
- The Giant Gila Monster (1959) – Old Man Harris
- Sergeant Rutledge (1960) – Mr. Owens (uncredited)
- The Man Who Shot Liberty Valance (1962) – Kaintuck (uncredited)
- Cheyenne Autumn (1964) – Skinny (uncredited)
- Git! (1965) – Sam Lewis
- The Cat (1966) – Bill Krim
- Cyborg 2087 (1966) – Short Station Attendant
- The Adventures of Bullwhip Griffin (1967) – Short Cowboy (uncredited)
- You've Got to Be Smart (1967)
- The Reivers (1969) – Cousin Zack
- Smoke (1970, TV Movie) – Leroy
- Cutter's Trail (1969, TV Movie) – Tuttle
- Guns of a Stranger (1973) – Shug Meadows
- Key West (1974, TV Movie) – Sam Olsen
- Hog Wild (1974, TV Movie) – Ropejon
- Castaway Cowboy (1974) – Capt. Cary
- Huckleberry Finn (1975, TV Movie) – Old Doc
- The Ghost of Cypress Swamp (1977, TV Movie) – Sherman Prather
- The 3,000 Mile Chase (1977, TV Movie) – Biker
- The Sacketts (1979, TV Mini-Series) – Purgatorie Barkeep
- The Apple Dumpling Gang Rides Again (1979) – Bartender
- Return of the Beverly Hillbillies (1981, TV Movie) – Judge Gillum

== Television credits ==
- Ozark Jubilee (1955–1960) – Himself – Comedian
- Have Gun, Will Travel (1957)
- Bonanza (1961–1970) – Toler / Driver / Gibson's Partner / Jeff
- Ripcord (1962–1963) as Charlie Kern
- Gunsmoke (1962–1974) – Mule Skinner / Dobie Crimps / Obie / Jed Rascoe / Silas Shute / Chengra / Emery / Hank Cooters
- Temple Houston (1963) – Augie Wren
- Petticoat Junction (1963) – Salesman
- Tammy (1965) – Uncle Cully
- Daniel Boone (1965–1966) – Tolliver / Jake Tench / Blacksmith / Second Man / Blacksmith / Jake Tench
- The Virginian (1965–1971) – Tinker / Desk Clerk / Telegrapher / Mr. Peterson / Pony Bill Steele
- The Legend of Jesse James (1965) – Barber
- Laredo (1965–1967) – Old Charlie / Old Prospector / 1st Fighter
- The Wild Wild West (1966–1967) – Jeremiah / Sheriff Blayne Cord
- The Monroes (1966) – Zeph
- Cimarron Strip (1967–1968) – Pinky / Smitty
- The Beverly Hillbillies (1969–1970) – Shorty Kellems / Scraggly Farmer
- Love, American Style (1972) – Abner (segment "Love and the Country Girl")
- This Is Your Life (1972) – Himself
- Kolchak: the Night Stalker (1975) – Pop Stenvold
- Petrocelli (1975) – Toot Gannon
- City of Angels (1976) – Whitey Hedges
- How the West Was Won (1978) – Ziggy
- Starsky and Hutch (1978) – Sam Ivers
- Lucan (1978) – Whiskey Bob
- The Dukes of Hazzard (1979) – Newtie / Homer
- Harper Valley PTA (1981) – Harry Haldeen (final appearance)

== Additional resources ==
- Griffis, Ken Hear My Song. "George "Shug" Fisher". www.bobnolan.com. ;
- Harkins, Anthony Hillbilly: A Cultural History of an American Icon Oxford University Press, 2004
