= Developmental disability =

Disability beginning before adulthood

Developmental disability is a diverse group of chronic conditions, comprising mental or physical impairments that arise before adulthood. Developmental disabilities cause individuals living with them many difficulties in certain areas of life, especially in "language, mobility, learning, self-help, and independent living". Developmental disabilities can be detected early on and persist throughout an individual's lifespan. Developmental disability that affects all areas of a child's development is sometimes referred to as global developmental delay.

== Common developmental disabilities ==
The most common developmental disabilities are:

- Motor disorders, and learning difficulties such as dyslexia, Tourette's syndrome, dyspraxia, dysgraphia, dyscalculia, and nonverbal learning disorder.
- Autism spectrum disorder (ASD, formerly the PDD umbrella covering Asperger syndrome and classic autism) causes difficulties in social communication as well as repetitive behaviors and restrictive interests. ASD affects speech, understanding body language and social interactions, as well as causing difficulty in understanding others' social cues (such as sarcasm and feelings). ASD also causes repetitive behaviors known as stimming, often as a result of hyper- or hypo-sensitivity to sensory input.
- Down syndrome is a genetic condition in which people are born with an extra copy of chromosome 21. This extra copy affects the development of the body and brain, causing a range of physical and mental impairments and disabilities for the individual.
- Fragile X syndrome, most frequent among males, is thought to cause autism and intellectual disability.
- Fetal alcohol spectrum disorders are a group of conditions caused prior to birth that can occur in a person whose mother drank alcohol during pregnancy.
- Cerebral palsy is a group of disorders that affect a person's ability to move and maintain balance and posture. They are the most common motor disability in childhood.
- Intellectual disability is defined as assessed to have an IQ below 70, along with limitations in adaptive functioning and onset before the age of 18 years.
- Attention deficit hyperactivity disorder (ADHD) is a neurodevelopmental disorder characterized by executive dysfunction. It interferes with attention span, self-control, emotional regulation — key aspects of cognitive control.

== Causes ==
The causes of developmental disabilities are varied and remain unknown in a large proportion of cases. Even in cases of known etiology, the line between "cause" and "effect" is not always clear, leading to difficulty in categorizing causes.

Genetic factors have long been implicated in causing developmental disabilities. These conditions are also believed to have a large environmental component, and the relative contributions of nature versus nurture have been debated for decades. Preterm birth is known to be a predictor for potential developmental disabilities later in childhood, which complicates the question of nature versus nurture, as

premature birth could already have resulted from earlier and longer existing difficulties. Second, being born at such an immature gestation could immediately have damaged the main organs (lungs and brain) or, third, such damage could arise in the neonatal period, for instance from the necessary intrusive treatment. Furthermore, exhaustion resulting from adaptation or stress could damage or disturb development. In addition, the highly stimulating hospital environment and the lack of social interactive experiences with the mother or the abundant interaction with others could add to the risk. In short, many reasons are conceivable that by itself or in different combinations could result in developmental problems of very preterm children.

Current theories on causation focus on genetic factors; more than 1,000 known genetic conditions include developmental disabilities as a symptom.

Developmental disabilities affect between 1 and 2% of the population in most western countries, although many government sources acknowledge that statistics are flawed in this area. The worldwide proportion of people with developmental disabilities is believed to be approximately 1.4%. Such disabilities are twice as common in males as in females, and some researchers have found that the prevalence of mild developmental disabilities is likely to be higher in areas of poverty and deprivation, and among people of certain ethnicities.

== Diagnosis and quantification ==
Developmental disabilities can be initially suspected when a child does not reach expected child development stages. Subsequently, a differential diagnosis may be used to diagnose an underlying disease, which may include a physical examination and genetic tests.

The degree of disability can be quantified by assigning a developmental age to a person, who may be classified by age group resulting from their test scores. This, in turn, can be used to calculate a developmental quotient (DQ) as follows:

$DQ = \frac{Developmental\ age}{Chronological\ age} * 100$

== Associated issues ==
=== Physical health issues ===
Many physical health factors associated with developmental disabilities. For some specific syndromes and diagnoses, these are inherent, such as poor heart function in people with Down syndrome. People with severe communication difficulties find it difficult to articulate their health needs and, without adequate support and education, might not recognize ill health. Epilepsy, sensory problems (such as poor vision and hearing), obesity, and poor dental health are over-represented in this population. Life expectancy among people with developmental disabilities as a group is estimated at 20 years below average, although this is improving. Society has advanced in its adaptive and medical technologies, and other methods to help people lead healthier, more fulfilling lives. In addition, some conditions (such as Freeman–Sheldon syndrome) do not affect life expectancy.

=== Mental health issues (dual diagnoses) ===
Mental health issues, and psychiatric illnesses, are more likely to occur in people with developmental disabilities than in the general population, including amongst children who need the support of caregivers who have sufficient psychoeducation and peer support. A number of factors are attributed to the high incidence rate of dual diagnoses:

- The high likelihood of encountering traumatic events throughout their lifetime (such as abandonment by loved ones, abuse, bullying and harassment)
- The social and developmental restrictions placed upon people with developmental disabilities (such as lack of education, poverty, limited employment opportunities, limited opportunities for fulfilling relationships, boredom)
- Biological factors (such as brain injury, epilepsy, illicit and prescribed drug and alcohol misuse)
- Developmental factors (such as lack of understanding of social norms and appropriate behavior, inability of those around to allow/understand expressions of grief and other human emotions)
- External monitoring factor: all federal- or state-funded residences are required to have some form of behavioral monitoring for each person with developmental disability at the residence. With this information psychological diagnoses are more easily given than with the general population that has less consistent monitoring.
- Access to health care providers: in the United States, all federal- or state-funded residences require the residents to have annual visits to various health care providers. With consistent visits to health care providers more people with developmental disabilities are likely to receive appropriate treatment than the general population that is not required to visit various health care providers.

These problems are exacerbated by difficulties in diagnosis of mental health issues, and in appropriate treatment and medication, as for physical health issues.

=== Post-traumatic stress disorder ===
Risks and development

Individuals with developmental disabilities have an increased risk of developing post-traumatic stress disorder compared to the general population due to heightened vulnerability to negative life experiences, including:

- Interpersonal trauma
- Abuse
- Dependence on caregivers
- Lack of autonomy
- Diminished social support
- Harassment
- Stigma and prejudice

Post-traumatic stress disorder is a psychological disorder that can develop after experiencing or witnessing trauma and is characterized by negative thoughts, memories, or dreams about the trauma, avoidance of reminders of the trauma, adverse changes in thinking and mood, and heightened acute stress response. Post-traumatic stress disorder often goes undiagnosed among individuals with developmental disabilities due to providers' and caregivers' lack of understanding and differences in communication ability.

Individuals with developmental disabilities may develop more intense symptoms of post-traumatic stress disorder when compared to the general population due to maladaptive coping and neurological differences. These symptoms may manifest differently depending on the severity of the disability; post-traumatic stress disorder may present as challenging behaviors such as aggression and self-harm, and communication of symptoms may be limited by verbal ability. Mental health problems are often reported by proxy rather than self-report, which can increase the risk of underreporting and of psychological symptoms going undiagnosed.

Psychological treatment

Diagnosis, assessment, and treatment approaches for post-traumatic stress disorder typically require verbal communication and insight into cognitions, emotions, and functioning. Individual differences in communication and intellectual ability among individuals with developmental, and particularly intellectual disabilities can limit identification and treatment of post-traumatic stress disorder symptoms. Thus, diagnosis and treatment approaches should be modified to fit the individual.

Some individuals with developmental disabilities may have difficulty understanding and articulating negative thought processes and emotions associated with traumatic events. Metaphors, simplified explanations, and explicit examples may help elucidate symptoms of post-traumatic stress disorder and improve understanding of treatment approaches. Frequent prompting, repetition of explanations, and developing detailed timelines of life events may also improve focus and engagement in psychological treatment. Providers should clearly understand individual needs and abilities and ensure that expectations for treatment are consistent with individual abilities and functioning.

The following trauma-specific treatments have demonstrated efficacy among individuals with developmental disabilities, particularly when tailored to individual needs and presentation.

Child–parent psychotherapy

Child-parent psychotherapy is a relational treatment that focuses on improving child-parent relationships and functioning following a young child's exposure to one or more traumatic experiences. This treatment is designed to enhance the attachment relationships between children between the ages of zero and five and their caregivers, eliciting a sense of safety and improving emotional regulation and behavior. Children with developmental disabilities have a higher risk of exposure to traumatic events than children within the general population. Child-parent psychotherapy can accommodate non-verbal communication, making it a good fit for children with a wide range of abilities. Child-parent psychotherapy has been demonstrated to reduce symptoms of post-traumatic stress disorder in children with developmental disabilities and may help enhance caregivers' understanding of their children's disabilities and individual needs. Two 2014 case studies demonstrated the efficacy of child-parent psychotherapy with two children who were exposed to traumatic events. One of the children was 14 months with global developmental delays, and the other was six with autism spectrum disorder. At the time of this study, most studies that evaluated the efficacy of child-parent psychotherapy did not include any information about children with autism or intellectual disabilities. Both children and their families had about one year of weekly therapy, and both saw improvements in attachment relations, decreased trauma symptoms, and overall improvements in functioning.

Exposure therapy

Exposure-based therapies are among the most common treatments for post-traumatic stress disorder. Exposure therapy involves exposing a patient to a source of stress (such as a memory or reminder of a traumatic event) to increase tolerance to feared stimuli, overcome avoidance, and gradually reduce acute stress response symptoms of post-traumatic stress. Exposure therapy should be carefully tailored to the individual when treating individuals with developmental disabilities to reduce the risk of re-traumatization. There is preliminary evidence that exposure therapy paired with relaxation techniques, cognitive restructuring, and problem-solving can reduce symptoms of post-traumatic stress disorder among individuals with developmental disabilities. In a 2009 case study, a 24-year-old woman with an intellectual disability experienced a reduction in posttraumatic stress disorder symptoms following nine exposure therapy sessions. The therapists used a shield analogy, in which they encouraged the client to envision newly learned relaxation techniques and coping statements as a shield protecting her. They used modified exposure to reduce the risk of re-traumatizing the client; she imagined her nightmares and flashbacks rather than the trauma itself.

Trauma focused cognitive behavioral therapy

Trauma focused cognitive behavioral therapy is a short-term treatment that focuses on reducing and changing negative and unhelpful thought processes related to traumatic experiences and processing and managing associated negative emotions. Differences in language and thinking can make cognitive-based interventions challenging for individuals with developmental, and particularly intellectual, disabilities. Still, there is evidence that trauma focused cognitive behavioral therapy can be adapted using metaphors and simplified examples to be accessible and beneficial for individuals with mild intellectual disabilities. In a 2016 case study, therapists used a metaphor to describe post-traumatic stress disorder and aid treatment for a young man diagnosed with an intellectual disability and autism spectrum disorder. They explained his symptoms by describing his brain as a kitchen cupboard and his traumatic memories as tins that had not been organized properly, and therefore kept falling out. The young man had a significant improvement in mood and symptoms after 12 sessions of adapted trauma focused cognitive behavioral therapy.

Eye movement desensitization and reprocessing

Eye-movement desensitization and reprocessing is a psychological treatment in which the patient's stress is reduced by associating traumatic experiences with bilateral stimulation such as rapid, rhythmic eye movements or tapping. Eye-movement desensitization is demonstrated to be highly effective at reducing symptoms of post-traumatic stress disorder across individuals with varying severity of intellectual disabilities; it has the most evidence for treating individuals with developmental disabilities based on numerous case studies. Eye-movement desensitization can be adapted for individuals with limited language abilities, making it accessible to a wide range of developmental disabilities.

=== Abuse and vulnerability ===
Abuse is a significant issue for people with developmental disabilities. They are regarded as a vulnerable people in most jurisdictions. Common types of abuse include:

- Physical abuse (withholding food, hitting, punching, pushing, etc.)
- Neglect (withholding help when required, e.g., assistance with personal hygiene)
- Sexual abuse is associated with psychological disturbance. Sequeira, Howlin, & Hollins found that sexual abuse was associated with increased rates of mental illness and behavioral problems, including symptoms of post-traumatic stress. Psychological reactions to abuse were similar to those observed in the general population, but with the addition of stereotypical behavior. The more serious the abuse, the more severe the symptoms that were reported.
- Psychological or emotional abuse (verbal abuse, shaming and belittling)
- Constraint and restrictive practices (such as turning off an electric wheelchair so a person cannot move)
- Financial abuse (charging unnecessary fees, holding onto pensions, wages, etc.)
- Legal or civil abuse (restricted access to services)
- Systemic abuse (denied access to an appropriate service due to perceived support needs)
- Passive neglect (a caregiver's failure to provide adequate food, and shelter)

Lack of education, lack of self-esteem and self-advocacy skills, lack of understanding of social norms and appropriate behavior and communication difficulties are strong contributing factors to the high incidence of abuse among this population. A study on the association between different types of childhood maltreatment and the risk of criminal recidivism has also shown that physical neglect during childhood plays a critical role in the repeated crime, independent of mental-health problems for high-risk adults involved with the criminal justice system.

In addition to abuse from people in positions of power, peer abuse is recognized as a significant, if misunderstood, problem. Rates of criminal offenses among people with developmental disabilities are also disproportionately high, and it is widely acknowledged that criminal justice systems throughout the world are ill-equipped for the needs of people with developmental disabilities, both as perpetrators and victims of crime. Failings in care have been identified in one in eight deaths of people with learning difficulties under NHS England.

=== Challenging behavior ===
People with developmental disabilities (particularly autistic spectrum disorders) can exhibit challenging behavior, defined as "culturally abnormal behaviours of such intensity, frequency or duration that the physical safety of the person or others is placed in serious jeopardy, or behaviour which is likely to seriously limit or deny access to the use of ordinary community facilities". Common types of challenging behavior include self-injurious behavior (such as hitting, headbutting, biting, hair-pulling), aggressive behavior (such as hitting others, shouting, screaming, spitting, kicking, swearing, headbutting, hair-pulling), inappropriate sexualized behavior (such as public masturbation or groping), behavior directed at property (such as throwing objects and stealing) and stereotyped behaviors (such as repetitive rocking, echolalia or elective incontinence). Such behaviors can be assessed to suggest areas of further improvement, using assessment tools such as the Nisonger Child Behavior Rating Form (NCBRF).

Challenging behavior in people with developmental disabilities may be caused by a number of factors, including biological (pain, medication, the need for sensory stimulation), social (boredom, seeking social interaction, the need for an element of control, lack of knowledge of community norms, insensitivity of staff and services to the person's wishes and needs), environmental (physical aspects such as noise and lighting, or gaining access to preferred objects or activities), psychological (feeling excluded, lonely, devalued, labelled, disempowered, living up to people's negative expectations) or simply a means of communication. A lot of the time, challenging behavior is learned and brings rewards and it is very often possible to teach people new behaviors to achieve the same aims. Challenging behavior in people with developmental disabilities can often be associated with specific mental health problems.

Experience and research suggest that what professionals call "challenging behavior" is often a reaction to the challenging environments that those providing services create around people with developmental disabilities. "Challenging behavior" in this context is a method of communicating dissatisfaction with the failure of those providing services to focus on what kind of life makes the most sense to the person and is often the only recourse a developmentally disabled person has against unsatisfactory services or treatment and the lack of opportunities made available to the person. This is especially the case where the services deliver lifestyles and ways of working that are centered on what suits the service provider and its staff, rather than what best suits the person.

In general, behavioral interventions or what has been termed applied behavior analysis has been found to be effective in reducing specific challenging behavior. Recently, efforts have been placed on developing a developmental pathway model in the behavior analysis literature to prevent challenging behavior from occurring. This method is controversial according to the Autistic Self Advocacy Network, saying that this type of therapy can lead to the development of post-traumatic stress disorder and worsening of symptoms later in life.

== Societal attitudes ==
Throughout history, people with developmental disabilities have been viewed as incapable and incompetent in their capacity for decision-making and development. Until the Enlightenment in Europe, care and asylum was provided by families and the Church (in monasteries and other religious communities), focusing on the provision of basic physical needs such as food, shelter and clothing. Stereotypes such as the dimwitted village idiot, and potentially harmful characterizations (such as demonic possession for people with epilepsy) were prominent in social attitudes of the time.

The movement towards individualism in the 18th and 19th centuries, and the opportunities afforded by the Industrial Revolution, led to housing and care using the asylum model. People were placed by, or removed from, their families (usually in infancy) and housed in large institutions (of up to 3,000 people, although some institutions were home to many more, such as the Philadelphia State Hospital in Pennsylvania which housed 7,000 people through the 1960s), many of which were self-sufficient through the labor of the residents. Some of these institutions provided a very basic level of education (such as differentiation between colors and basic word recognition and numeracy), but most continued to focus solely on the provision of basic needs. Conditions in such institutions varied widely, but the support provided was generally non-individualized, with aberrant behavior and low levels of economic productivity regarded as a burden to society. Heavy tranquilization and assembly line methods of support (such as "birdfeeding" and cattle herding) were the norm, and the medical model of disability prevailed. Services were provided based on the relative ease to the provider, not based on the human needs of the individual.

Early in the twentieth century, the eugenics movement became popular throughout the world. This led to the forced sterilization and prohibition of marriage for those with developmental disabilities in most of the developed world and was later used by Hitler as rationale for the mass murder of intellectually disabled individuals during the Holocaust. The eugenics movement was later thought to be seriously flawed and in violation of human rights and the practice of forced sterilization and prohibition from marriage was discontinued by most of the developed world by the mid 20th century.

In the United States, the segregation of people with developmental disabilities and the conditions of these institutions was not widely questioned by academics or policy-makers until the 1960s. US President John F. Kennedy, whose sister Rosemary had an intellectual disability and was in an institution, created the President's Panel on Mental Retardation in 1961. Robert F. Kennedy's visit with TV crew to Willowbrook State School, which he described as a "snake pit" and the publication the next year of Christmas in Purgatory, a photoessay featuring photos covertly taken of institutions, shone a light on the inhumane conditions in public institutions.

Initial efforts focused around reforming the institution; however, that began to change by the late 1960s. The normalization movement began to gain ground in the US and internationally. In the US the publication of Wolf Wolfensberger's seminal work "The Origin and Nature of Our Institutional Models", was very influential. This book posited that society characterizes people with disabilities as deviant, sub-human and burdens of charity, resulting in the adoption of that "deviant" role. Wolfensberger argued that this dehumanization, and the segregated institutions that result from it, ignored the potential productive contributions that all people can make to society. He pushed for a shift in policy and practice that recognized the human needs of "retardates" and provided the same basic human rights as for the rest of the population.

The publication of this book may be regarded as the first move towards the widespread adoption of the social model of disability in regard to these types of disabilities, and was the impetus for the development of government strategies for desegregation. Successful lawsuits against governments and an increasing awareness of human rights and self-advocacy also contributed to this process, resulting in the passing in the U.S. of the Civil Rights of Institutionalized Persons Act in 1980.

From the 1960s to the present, most U.S. states have moved towards the elimination of segregated institutions. Along with the work of Wolfensberger and others including Gunnar and Rosemary Dybwad, a number of scandalous revelations around the horrific conditions within state institutions created public outrage that led to change to a more community-based method of providing services. By the mid-1970s, most governments had committed to de-institutionalization, and had started preparing for the wholesale movement of people into the general community, in line with the principles of normalization. In most countries, this was essentially complete by the late 1990s, although the debate over whether or not to close institutions persists in some states, including Massachusetts.

Individuals with developmental disabilities are not fully integrated into society. Person-centered planning and person-centered approaches are seen as methods of addressing the continued labeling and exclusion of socially devalued people, such as people with a developmental disability label, encouraging a focus on the person as someone with capacities and gifts, as well as support needs.

In the USA new laws were established to protect the people with developmental disabilities from discriminations such as the 1990 Americans with Disabilities Act (ADA) and the 2000 Developmental Disabilities Assistance and Bill of Rights Act (DD Act).

== Services and support ==
Today, support services are provided by government agencies, non-governmental organizations and by private sector providers. Support services address most aspects of life for people with developmental disabilities, and are usually theoretically based in community inclusion, using concepts such as social role valorization and increased self-determination (using models such as Person Centred Planning). Support services are funded through government block funding (paid directly to service providers by the government), through individualized funding packages (paid directly to the individual by the government, specifically for the purchase of services) or privately by the individual (although they may receive certain subsidies or discounts, paid by the government). There also are a number of non-profit agencies dedicated to enriching the lives of people living with developmental disabilities and erasing the barriers they have to being included in their community.

=== Education and training ===
Education and training opportunities for people with developmental disabilities have expanded greatly in recent times, with many governments mandating universal access to educational facilities, and more students moving out of special schools and into mainstream classrooms with support.

Post-secondary education and vocational training is also increasing for people with these types of disabilities, although many programs offer only segregated "access" courses in areas such as literacy, numeracy and other basic skills. Legislation (such as the UK's Disability Discrimination Act 1995) requires educational institutions and training providers to make "reasonable adjustments" to curriculum and teaching methods in order to accommodate the learning needs of students with disabilities, wherever possible. There are also some vocational training centers that cater specifically to people with disabilities, providing the skills necessary to work in integrated settings, one of the largest being Dale Rogers Training Center in Oklahoma City.

=== At-home and community support ===
Many people with developmental disabilities live in the general community, either with family members, in supervised-group homes or in their own homes (that they rent or own, living alone or with flatmates). At-home and community supports range from one-to-one assistance from a support worker with identified aspects of daily living (such as budgeting, shopping or paying bills) to full 24-hour support (including assistance with household tasks, such as cooking and cleaning, and personal care such as showering, dressing and the administration of medication). The need for full 24-hour support is usually associated with difficulties recognizing safety issues (such as responding to a fire or using a telephone) or for people with potentially dangerous medical conditions (such as asthma or diabetes) who are unable to manage their conditions without assistance.

In the United States, a support worker is known as a direct support professional (DSP). The DSP works in assisting the individual with their ADLs and also acts as an advocate for the individual with a developmental disability, in communicating their needs, self-expression and goals.

Supports of this type also include assistance to identify and undertake new hobbies or to access community services (such as education), learning appropriate behavior or recognition of community norms, or with relationships and expanding circles of friends. Most programs offering at-home and community support are designed with the goal of increasing the individual's independence, although it is recognized that people with more severe disabilities may never be able to achieve full independence in some areas of daily life.

=== Residential accommodation ===
Most people with developmental disabilities live with their parents or in residential accommodation (also known as group homes, care homes, adult family homes, congregate living facilities, etc.) with other people with similar assessed needs. These homes are usually staffed around the clock, usually house between three and fifteen residents, and tend to be highly structured. The prevalence of this type of support is gradually decreasing, however, as residential accommodation is replaced by at-home and community support, which can offer increased choice and self-determination for individuals. Some U.S. states still provide institutional care, such as the Texas State Schools. The type of residential accommodation is usually determined by the level of developmental disability and mental health needs.

=== Employment support ===
Employment support usually consists of two types of support:

- Support to access or participate in integrated employment, in a workplace in the general community. This may include specific programs to increase the skills needed for successful employment (work preparation), job placement assistance or a career counseling, assistive technology, or extra support from other workers.
- The provision of specific employment opportunities within segregated business services. Although these are designed as "transitional" services (teaching work skills needed to move into integrated employment), many people remain in such services for the duration of their working life. The types of work performed in business services include mailing and packaging services, cleaning, gardening and landscaping, timber work, metal fabrication, farming, and sewing.

Workers with developmental disabilities have historically been paid less for their labor than those in the general workforce, although this is gradually changing with government initiatives, the enforcement of anti-discrimination legislation and changes in perceptions of capability in the general community.

In the United States, a variety of initiatives have been launched in the past decade to reduce unemployment among workers with disabilities—estimated by researchers at over 60%. Most of these initiatives are directed at employment in mainstream businesses. They include heightened placement efforts by the community agencies serving people with developmental disabilities, as well as by government agencies.

Additionally, state-level initiatives are being launched to increase employment among workers with disabilities. In California, the state senate in 2009 created the Senate Select Committee on Autism and Related Disorders. The committee has been examining additions to existing community employment services, and also new employment approaches. Committee member Lou Vismara, chairman of the MIND Institute at University of California, Davis, is pursuing the development of a planned community for persons with autism and related disorders in the Sacramento region. Another committee member, Michael Bernick, the former director of the state labor department, has established a program at the California state university system, starting at California State University East Bay, to support students with autism on the college level. Other Committee efforts include mutual support employment efforts, such as disability job networks, job boards, and identifying business lines that build on the strengths of persons with disabilities.

Though efforts are being made to integrate individuals with developmental disabilities into the workforce, businesses are still reluctant to employ individuals with IDD because of their poor communication skills and emotional intelligence. High functioning individuals with developmental disabilities can find it difficult to work in an environment that requires teamwork and direct communication due to their lack of social awareness. Working with employers to better understand the disorders and barriers that may come from the struggles associated with them, can greatly impact the quality of life for these individuals.

=== Day services ===
Non-vocational day services are usually known as day centers, and are traditionally segregated services offering training in life skills (such as meal preparation and basic literacy), center-based activities (such as crafts, games and music classes) and external activities (such as day trips). Some more progressive day centers also support people to access vocational training opportunities (such as college courses), and offer individualized outreach services (planning and undertaking activities with the individual, with support offered one-to-one or in small groups).

Traditional day centers were based on the principles of occupational therapy, and were created as respite for family members caring for their loved ones with disabilities. This is slowly changing, however, as programs offered become more skills-based and focused on increasing independence.

=== Advocacy ===
Advocacy is a support field for people with developmental disabilities. Advocacy groups now exist in most jurisdictions, working collaboratively with people with disabilities for systemic change in policy or legislation and for individual protections. Most advocacy groups also work to support people throughout the world, increase their capacity for self-advocacy, and teach skills necessary for people to advocate for their own needs.

=== Other types of support ===
Other types of support for people with developmental disabilities may include:

- Therapeutic services, such as speech therapy, occupational therapy, physical therapy, massage, aromatherapy, art, dance/movement or music therapy
- Supported holidays
- Short-stay respite services (for people who live with family members or other unpaid carers)
- Transport services, such as dial-a-ride or free bus passes
- Specialist behavior support services, such as high-security services for people with high-level, high-risk challenging behaviors
- Specialist relationships and sex education.

Programs are set up around the country in hopes to educate individuals with and without developmental disabilities. Studies have tested specific scenarios on the most beneficial way to educate people. Interventions are one way to educate people, but are also the most time-consuming: with busy schedules, the intervention approach can be difficult. Another less beneficial but more realistic scenario, in the time sense, was the psycho educational approach. It focuses on informing people on what abuse is, how to spot abuse, and what to do when it is spotted.

== See also ==
- American Coalition of Citizens with Disabilities
- Behavioral cusp
- Disability abuse
- List of disability rights activists
- List of disability rights organizations
