= Hy Heath =

American author, composer, entertainer, and songwriter from New York

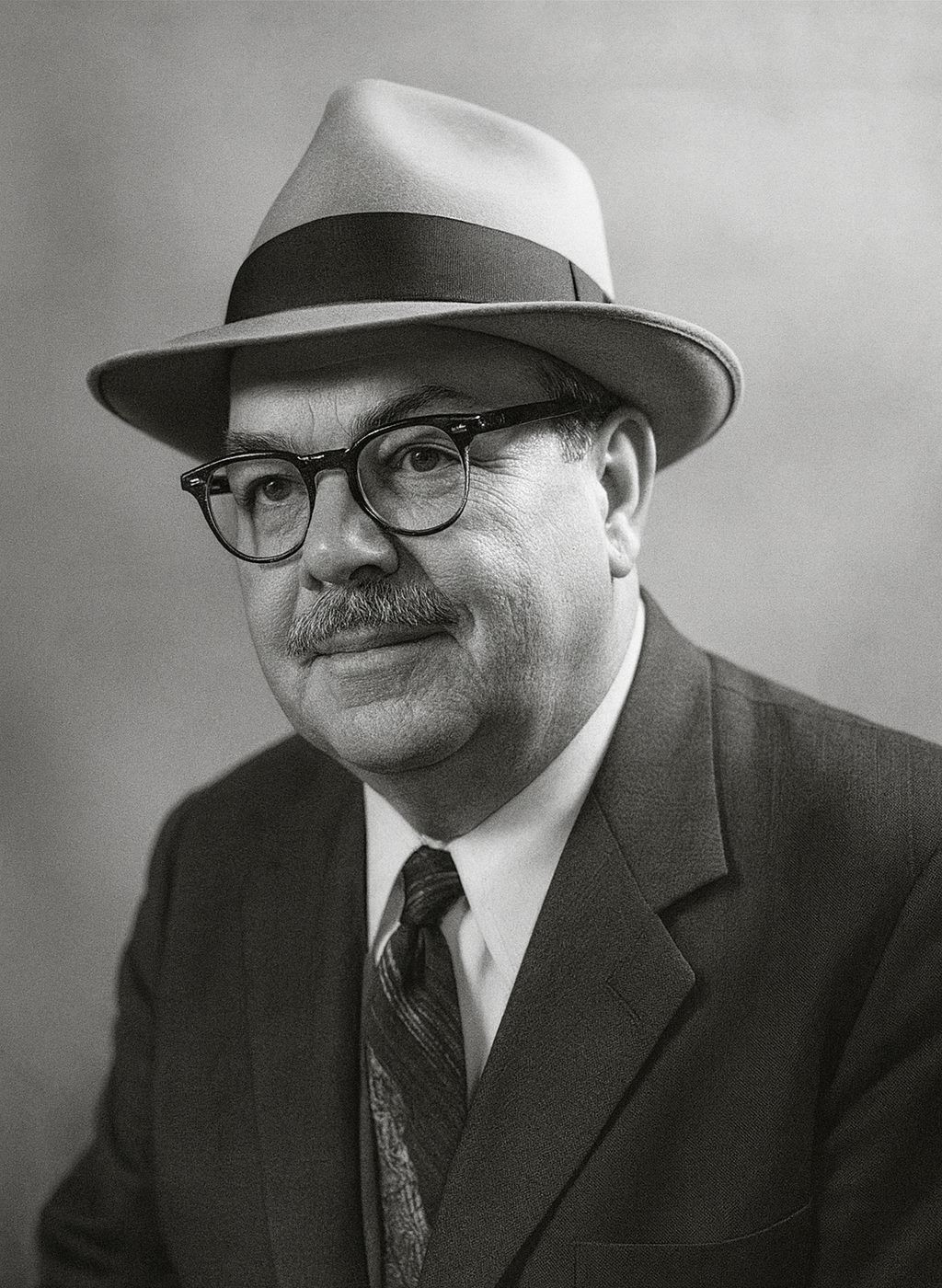

Walter Henry "Hy" Heath (July 9, 1890 – April 3, 1965) was an American entertainer, songwriter, composer and writer. Born in Oakville, Tennessee, he received his education in public schools and then became a comedian in musical comedy, vaudeville, minstrel and burlesque shows. Hy performed with fellow Vaudevillian and longtime family friend Dan White (actor) during the late 1920s into the early 1930s.

His chief musical collaborators included Johnny Lange and Fred Rose. His most successful composition was "Mule Train" which earned him an Academy Award nomination (it was featured in the 1950 film Singing Guns).

Another of his many popular songs which he composed was "The Hills of Utah" which was sung by Ken Curtis in the Hollywood western Stallion Canyon starring Ken Curtis and Carolina Cotton.

== Death ==
Walter died on April 3, 1965 in Los Angeles, CA at the age of 74. He was laid to rest in Forest Lawn Memorial Park, Glendale, Los Angeles County, California, USA
