= Painless Parker =

Canadian-born American street dentist (1872–1952)

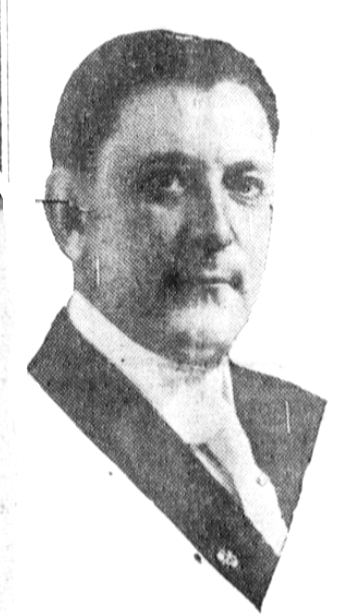
- Born: Edgar R.R. Parker; March 22, 1872; Tynemouth Creek, New Brunswick, Canada
- Died: November 8, 1952 (aged 80); San Francisco, California, US
- Occupation: Dentist
- Spouse: Frances Elizabeth Wolfe Parker (d.1945)
- Children: 3

Full page newspaper ad for the West Coast dental practice

Painless Parker (born Edgar R.R. Parker; March 22, 1872 – November 8, 1952) was a Canadian-born street dentist described as "a menace to the dignity of the profession" by the American Dental Association. However, some of the causes he championed, such as accessible dental care and advertising, have since been accepted.

== Career ==
Parker was born in Tynemouth Creek, a village near St. Martins, New Brunswick. He studied at Acadia University in Wolfville, Nova Scotia and the Baptist Seminary in St. Martins, New Brunswick, but was expelled from both. He worked as a cook on a ship and as a travelling merchant. He decided to pursue medicine but found the costs prohibitive, so he instead enrolled at the New York College of Dentistry. Before receiving a degree, Parker founded a renegade door-to-door dentistry practice to make tuition. Because of this, he was expelled. He enrolled in Temple University School of Dentistry (formerly Philadelphia Dental College) and after pleading with the reluctant dean, he was granted a diploma in 1892. He returned to New Brunswick.

After six weeks without a single patient, he began to advertise. He founded a traveling medicine show, eventually known as Parker Dental Circus, and traveled across the North American wilderness on horseback, removing teeth from gold miners and saloon regulars. In 1897 he opened a practice in Brooklyn, New York.

Painless hired employees including his brother, HC Parker, to assist in operations. A 1910 article in Hamptons magazine describes Parker's brownstone, located in "Brooklyn's busiest square" (current location of the Barclays Center), as "a monument to the colossal and blatant self-puffery of the most notorious of all the swindling tooth tinkers. It is the original headquarters of the most conceited charlatan that dental quackery has ever known, the citadel of Painless Parker, the drum-corps dentist." The outside of his building featured alliterative slogans such as "Painless Parker Is Positively Perfect" and "Pains and Pangs Positively Prevented."

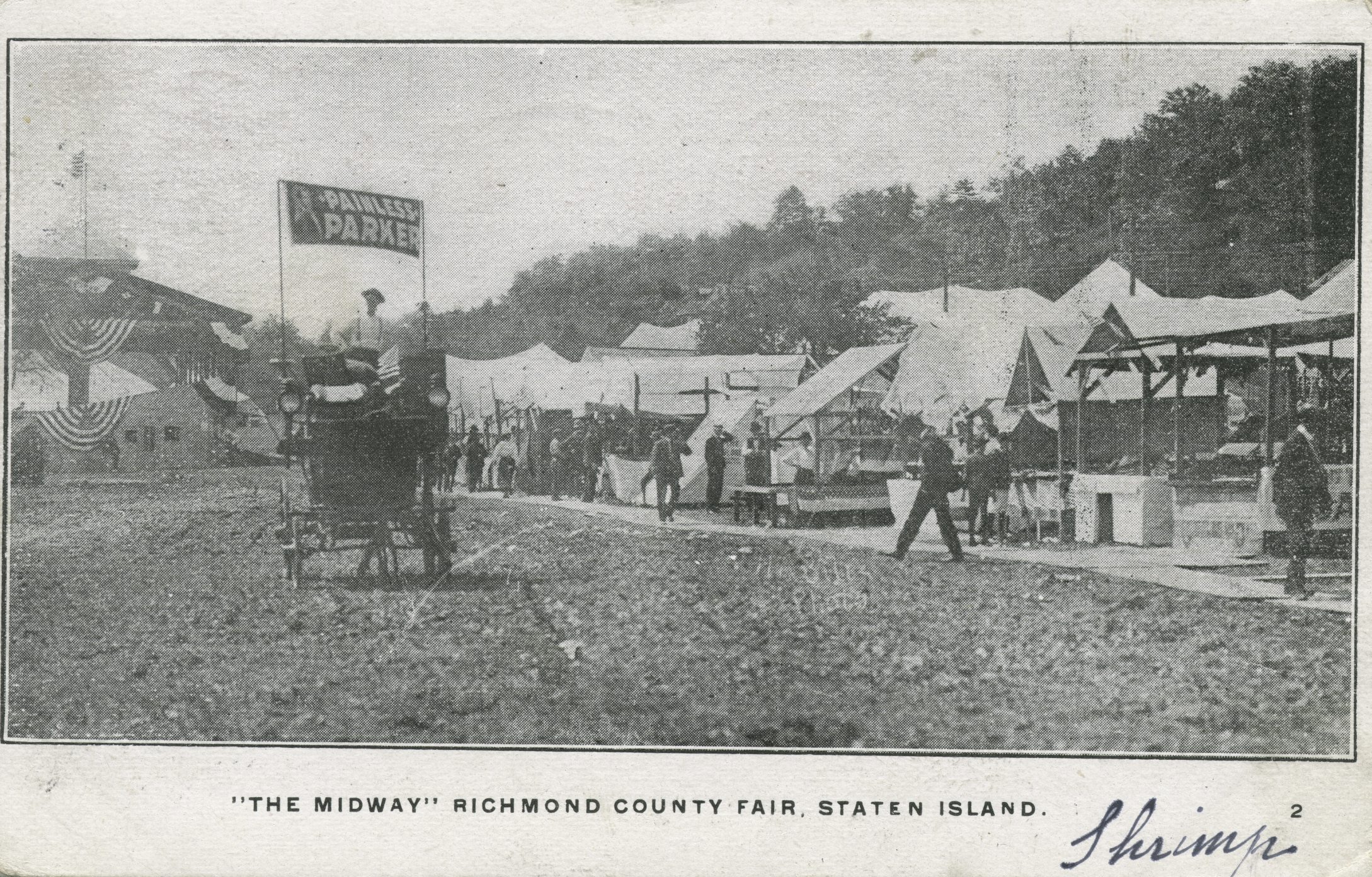
Painless Parker's cart at The Midway Richmond County Fair, Staten Island.

In 1913, Parker purchased a traveling circus and became its ringmaster, performing dental work with sideshow acts such as elephants, contortionists, trapeze artists, clowns, and a loud brass band that attracted crowds. Parker charged 50 cents for each extraction and promised to pay each patient $5 if the procedure hurt. He numbed patients with a cocaine solution that he called "hydrocaine" and sometimes whiskey. To encourage participation, Painless began with a demonstration in which he pretended to yank a molar from a calm audience member, whom he had planted. During actual extractions, Painless had the band play loudly to cover the patient's moans and screams. At one point, he claimed to have pulled 357 teeth in one day, which he wore on a necklace. While lecturing crowds on the importance of dental hygiene, he kept a bucket of teeth by his feet. In 1915, he legally changed his first name to "Painless" after he was accused of breaking a false advertisement law by claiming that his dentistry was truly painless.

Painless Parker garnered publicity for various stunts, including appearances with celebrities and treating a hippo named Lucas. When business thrived he opened dozens of clinics across North America, including 28 dental offices in the Western US, where he sold products for at-home dental care including mouthwashes and toothpastes, the first of their time. He employed over 240 dental staff including 75 dentists, and grossed $3 million per year.

Painless Parker's license was regularly revoked in various states, and he took part in considerable legal action. On July 4, 1935, Parker dropped a $100,000 slander suit against Morris Fishbein of the American Medical Association who publicly called Painless Parker "Charlatan and a quack". Other targets of Painless Parker's court battles include Oakland mayor who attempted to ban sidewalk dentistry.

In his later years, he embarked on publicized travels on his yacht, the Idalia. In 1925 he entered in a yacht race from the Golden Gate Bridge to Papeete, Tahiti and finished in last place. Though he was sued for running a man over with his yacht, Parker successfully dodged charges.

Painless Parker had two daughters and a son. He died of a heart ailment at Permanente Hospital in San Francisco on November 8, 1952. He was 80. His obituary declared him "America's most widely advertised chain dentist" and said he "made and lost several fortunes in what he once termed 'the noble tooth-plumbing profession.'"

== Legacy ==
He inspired the character "Painless Potter" in the 1948 Western comedy Paleface, played by Bob Hope. Parker is mentioned in the song "Orange Claw Hammer" by musician and poet Captain Beefheart. The Historical Dental Museum at the Temple University School of Dentistry has a display dedicated to Parker, with his necklace of 357 teeth and a large wooden bucket filled to the brim with teeth that he had personally pulled.

In a Smithsonian magazine article, Parker is described as "a huckster and, arguably, a con man" as well as "a founding father of good dental practices", the latter because the problems with his practices may have contributed to the development of professional ethics in dentistry. In 2016, the dean of Temple University's dental school said "any positive patient stories are likely to be fake", explaining that "Painless Parker was sued many times and lost his dental licenses in several states. He was a showman more than a real dentist".

Painless Parker's largest office, located on 7th and Main in Los Angeles, still operates as a dental practice under new owners. Its patients include some descendants of Parker's patients.

A 2014 article from the New York Times described him as "A quintessential snake-oil salesman in goatee, top hat and cutaway coat, he established the first — and presumably last — sidewalk dental show."
