= Nisonger Child Behavior Rating Form =

Assessment tool for children with disabilities

The Nisonger Child Behavior Rating Form (NCBRF) is an instrument designed to assess the behavior of children with intellectual or developmental disabilities and those with autism spectrum disorder. The assessment contains 76 items 10 Positive/Social items and 66 Problem Behavior items). The NCBRF is made up of three sections: I, Where raters can identify unusual circumstances that may have affected the youth's behavior; II, where positive behaviors are rated, and III, a listing of problem behaviors. There are separate Teacher and a Parent versions of the form, and the NCBRF takes about 15 minutes to complete. The NCBRF is designed to be used with children and adolescents ages 3 to 16 years. Several research studies have found the NCBRF to be a reliable and valid measure in the assessment of behavior in children and adolescents.

== Section Breakdown, Scoring and Interpretation ==
=== Section I ===
Section I contains one short answer question that asks the parent/teacher to describe any specific circumstances or factors that may have influenced the child's recent behavior. This section allows such circumstances to be taken into consideration when interpreting the scoring of the rest of the assessment. Examples may be significant illnesses of a parent or extended visit of a cousin, resulting in altered behavior.

=== Section II ===
Section II has ten items that inquire about the occurrence of prosocial or positive behaviors. Each item presents a behavior, and the respondent is asked to rate on a 4-point scale, if that behavior applies to the child with the following response options:

- 0: "Not True"
- 1: "Somewhat or Sometimes True"
- 2: "Very or Often True"
- 3: "Completely or Always True"

The Positive Social scale in Section II contains two subscales: a compliant/calm subscale and an adaptive social subscale. The score sheet indicates which items fall under each subscale. Responses for the relevant items are summed together to yield two subscale scores. The subscales should be interpreted separately and should not be totaled. Higher scores indicate more adaptive behavior.

=== Section III ===
Section III addresses potential problem behaviors, and consists of 66 questions. Each question addresses a behavioral issue and asks the respondent to identify on a 4-point scale how often or severe the behavior has been over the past month using the following response options:

- 0: "if the behavior did not occur or was not a problem"
- 1: "if the behavior occurred occasionally or was a mild problem"
- 2: "if the behavior occurred quite often or was a moderate problem"
- 3: "if the behavior occurred a lot or was a severe problem"

The Problem Behavior section contains six subscales: a Conduct Problem subscale, an Insecure/Anxious subscale, a Hyperactive subscale, a Self-Injury/Stereotypic subscale, a Self-Isolated/Ritualistic subscale, and an Overly Sensitive subscale. The score sheet indicates which items fall under each subscale. Responses for each item are summed together to yield six subscale scores. Subscale scores are interpreted on their own; they are *not* added to create at total Problem Behavior score. Higher scores for each subscale suggest increased severity of problem behavior in that subscale category.

== Nisonger Child Behavior Form- Typical IQ Version (NCBRF-TIQ) ==
The NCBRF-TIQ is a 66-item behavior rating form designed to assess the behavior of children and adolescents with typical development. This instrument has identical sections and response options as the NCBRF. However Section III only has 56 items and subscale composition differs slightly.

=== Score interpretation ===
Scoring for the NCBRF-TIQ is similar to the NCBRF. However, given that the NCBRF was developed for youth with developmental disabilities and the NCBRF-TIQ was designed for typically developing children, it is not surprising that factor analysis derived somewhat different behavioral constructs. Section II (Positive/Social behaviors) is not broken up into subscales; its items resolve onto one subscale that reflects “Social Competence.” Higher scores in Section II would indicate greater social competence. Section III of the NCBRF-TIQ has six subscales: an Overly Sensitive subscale, an Oppositional subscale, a Conduct Problem subscale, a Hyperactive subscale, an Inattentive subscale and a Withdrawn/Dysphoric subscale. Higher subscale scores indicate greater expression of these behavioral traits. Section III of the NCBRF-TIQ allows two superordinate domains to be computed: one for Disruptive Behavior and one for Attention Deficit/Hyperactivity Disorder (ADHD). Scores from the Oppositional subscale and the Conduct Problem subscale are summed to produce a total score for Disruptive Behavior (D-Total). Scores from the Hyperactive subscale and the Inattentive subscale are summed to produce a total score for ADHD (ADHD-Total). High scores within these subscales could suggest a potential for diagnosing these disorders.
