= Street dentistry =

Unlicensed practice of dentistry in the street

Street dentistry is the unlicensed practice of dentistry in the street, usually for people who are unable to afford licensed dental care.

== History ==
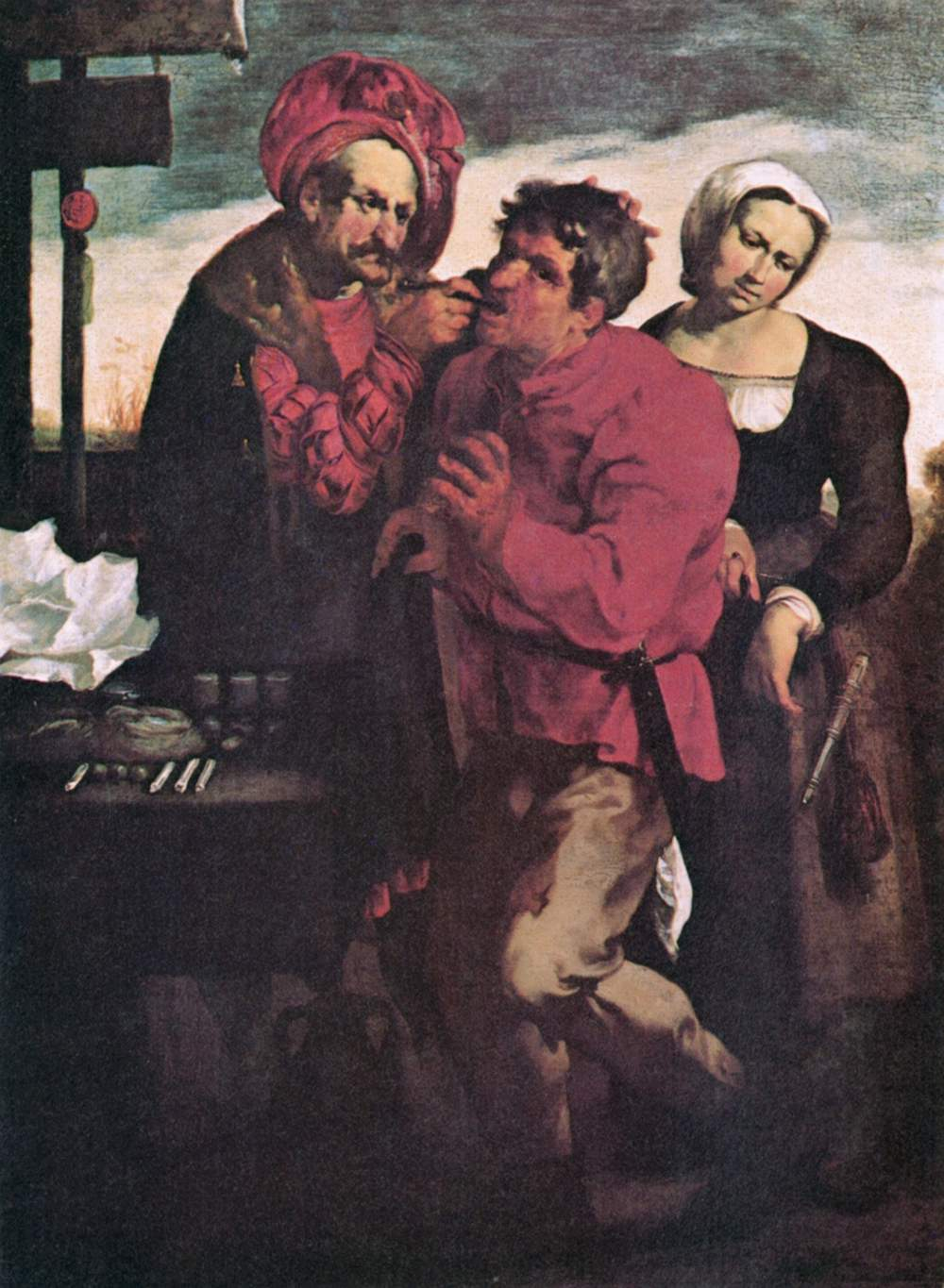
A depiction of an early 17th-century dentist practicing outdoors by Johann Liss.

Before the 20th century, dentistry was largely unregulated. In Europe during the Middle Ages, it was often practiced by monks, who were the most educated of the period. Barbers and blacksmiths, too, performed dental services. One of the first attempts to regulate the practice of dentistry came in France in 1400, when royal decrees prohibited barbers not in the Guild of Barbers from performing surgical procedures except for bleeding, cupping, leeching, and extracting teeth.

In the United States in 1840, Horace H. Hayden and Chapin Harris established the world's first school of dentistry, the Baltimore College of Dental Surgery, and created the Doctor of Dental Surgery degree. In the same year, the world's first national dental organization, the American Society of Dental Surgeons, was founded. In 1841, Alabama instituted the first dental practice act, regulating the practice of dentistry in the United States.

In New York around the turn of the century, street dentists like Edgar R.R. "Painless" Parker flourished. Despite dentistry becoming regulated, unlicensed dentists still practiced, often offering inferior services, prompting some to call for their prosecution.

As many as 5,000 unlicensed dentists may have practiced in New York in the early 1900s. In 1900, 283 complaints were received by the Law Committee of the New York State Dental Society. Some patients died from infections and abscesses resulting from lack of sanitation. Others died from improper administration of anaesthetic. According to a newspaper report in 1910, many of these dentists were immigrants whose home countries did not regulate dentistry as stringently as did the United States.

== Modern street dentistry ==
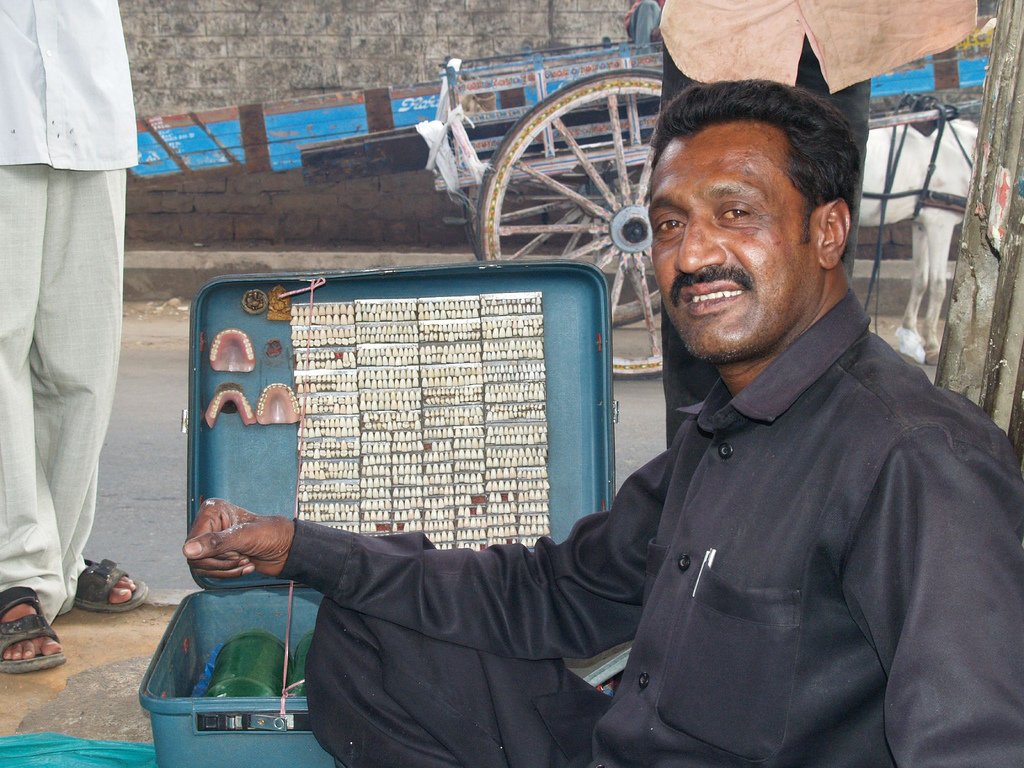
A street dentist in Bangalore

In India, street services are plentiful, with dentists operating alongside other street services, such as apothecaries, repairmen, and barbers. These practitioners charge far less than licensed dentists, often charging as little as 125 rupees for a procedure such as a bridge—which, at a licensed dentist, could be as expensive as 10,000 rupees. Many learn the trade from their parents.

Street dentistry is not confined to India. In Paris in 2003, 23 unlicensed dentists who practiced out of cafes and grocery stores were arrested. The dentists involved were Syrian immigrants who provided dental services mostly for other immigrants who did not have health insurance. In 1998, a man was arrested in Van Nuys, California for operating an unlicensed dental practice out of the back of a toy store in a strip mall.

== Legal issues ==
In India, Chapter V, Section 49 of the Dentist Act of 1948 requires dentists, dental mechanics, and dental hygienists to be licensed, making street dentistry illegal, though street dentists continue to practice. Most countries in the developed world have laws preventing the unlicensed practice of dentistry.

== See also ==
- Dentistry throughout the world
