= Dale Evans =

American actress, singer and writer (1912–2001)

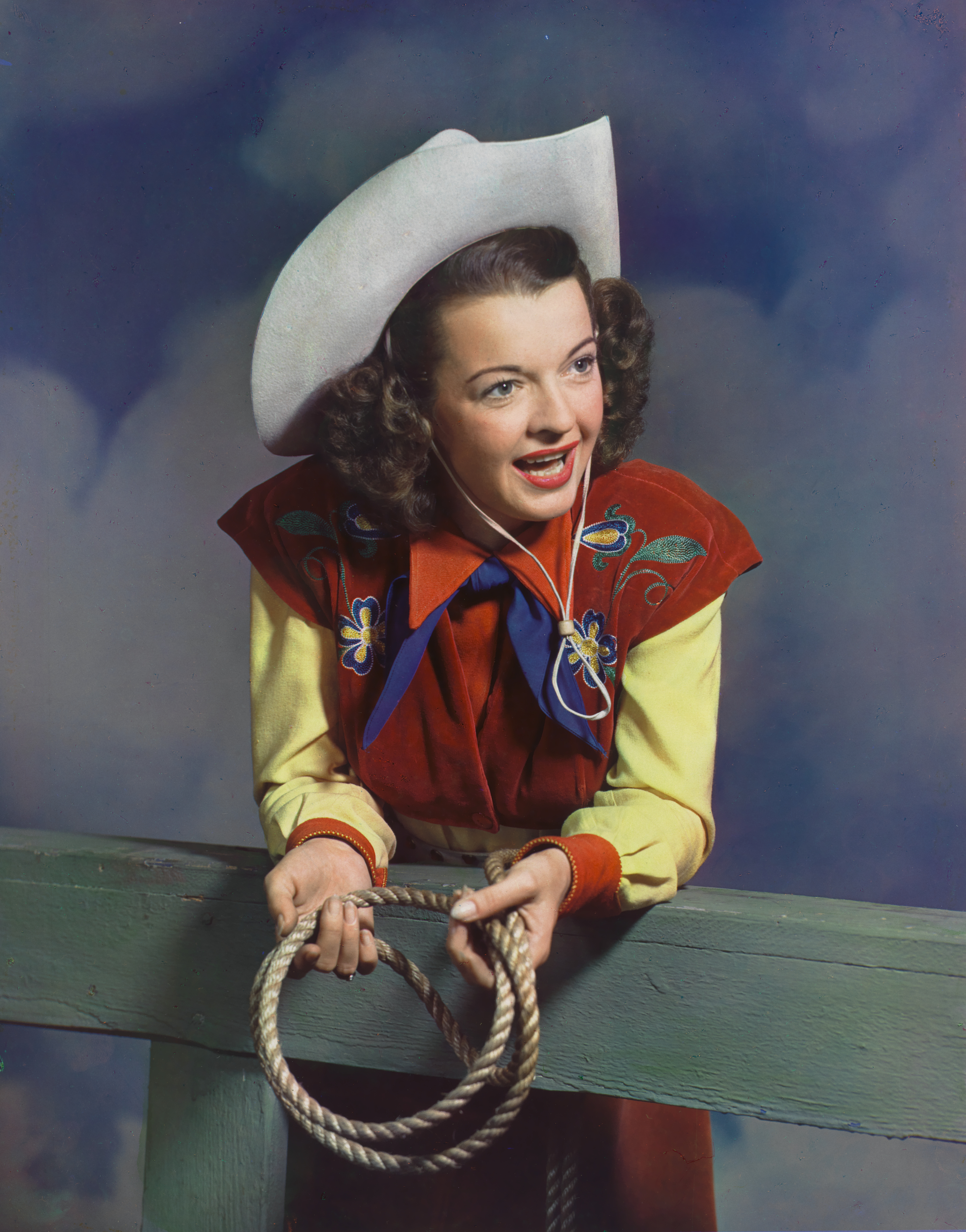
- Evans in 1947
- Born: Frances Octavia Smith; October 31, 1912; Uvalde, Texas, US
- Died: February 7, 2001 (aged 88); Apple Valley, California, US
- Resting place: Sunset Hills Memorial Park, Apple Valley
- Occupations: Actress; singer; songwriter; recording artist
- Years active: 1930–2001
- Spouses: Thomas Frederick Fox (m. 1927; div. 1929) August Wayne Johns (m. 1929; div. 1935) Robert Dale Butts (m. 1937; div. 1946) Roy Rogers (m. 1947; died 1998)
- Children: 6

Dale Evans Rogers (October 31, 1912 – February 7, 2001) was an American actress, singer, and songwriter. She was the third wife of singing cowboy film star Roy Rogers and starred alongside him in many films.

== Early life and career ==
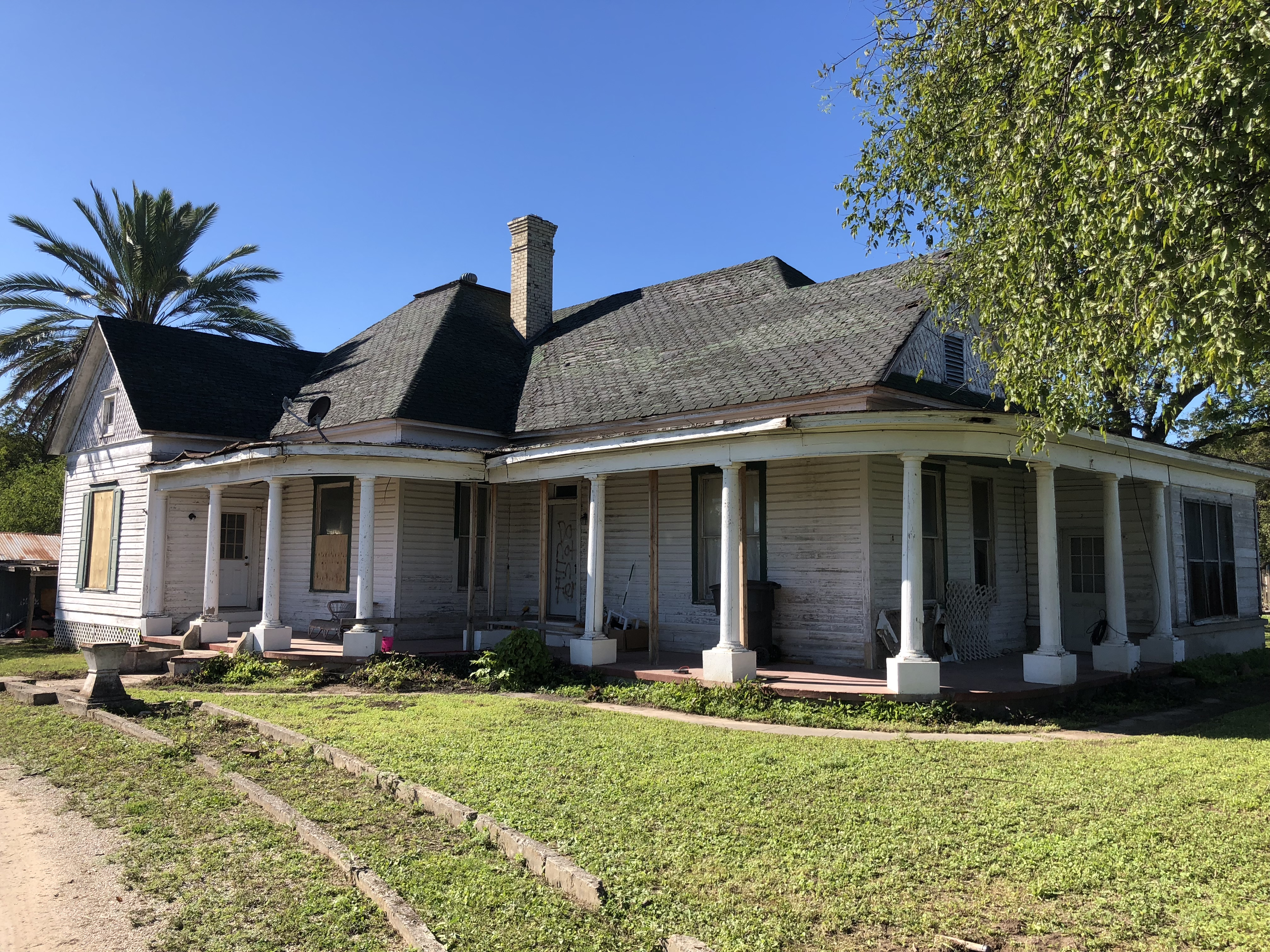
Evans' childhood home in Uvalde, Texas

Evans was born Frances Octavia Smith in Uvalde, Texas, to Bettie Sue Wood and T. Hillman Smith. She was raised in Italy, Texas. She started singing at the community's Baptist church when she was 3. (Note: For unknown reasons, the doctor who attended the birth recorded the baby's name as Lucille Wood Smith, a fact of which she was unaware until the 1950s, when she needed a copy of her birth certificate to obtain a passport.)

She briefly lived with her maternal aunt and her husband, Dr. L. D. Massey MD FACP, an internal medicine physician, in Osceola, Arkansas, at the age of 9, and again at 11 for medical treatment. She described them as "really second parents to me.” She had a tumultuous early life. At age 14, she eloped with and married Thomas F. Fox, with whom she had one son, Thomas F. Fox Jr., when she was 15. A year later, abandoned by her husband, she found herself in Memphis, Tennessee, a single parent pursuing a career in music. She took courses in business and landed a job at a bus company and later an insurance agency.

After her boss overheard her singing, she landed jobs with Memphis radio stations (WMC and WREC), singing and playing piano. In 1930, she moved to Chicago, Illinois to expand her career. She was diagnosed with malnutrition shortly after. Divorced in 1929, she took the name Dale Evans while working at radio station WHAS (Louisville, Kentucky) in the early 1930s under the names Frances Fox and Marian Lee after the station manager suggested it because he believed she could promote her singing career with a short pleasant-sounding name that announcers and disc jockeys could easily pronounce.

== Early career ==
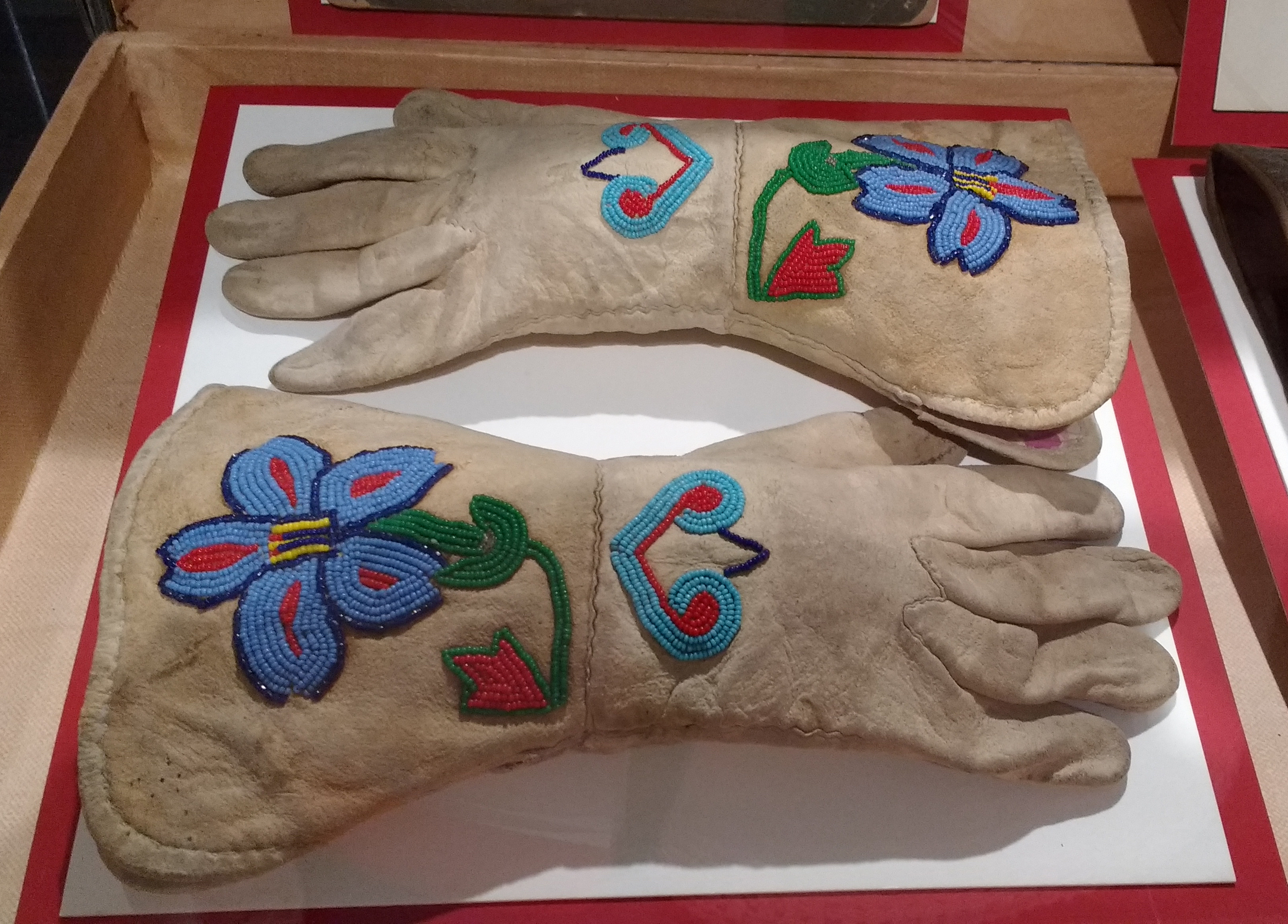
Evans' embroidered white leather gauntlets

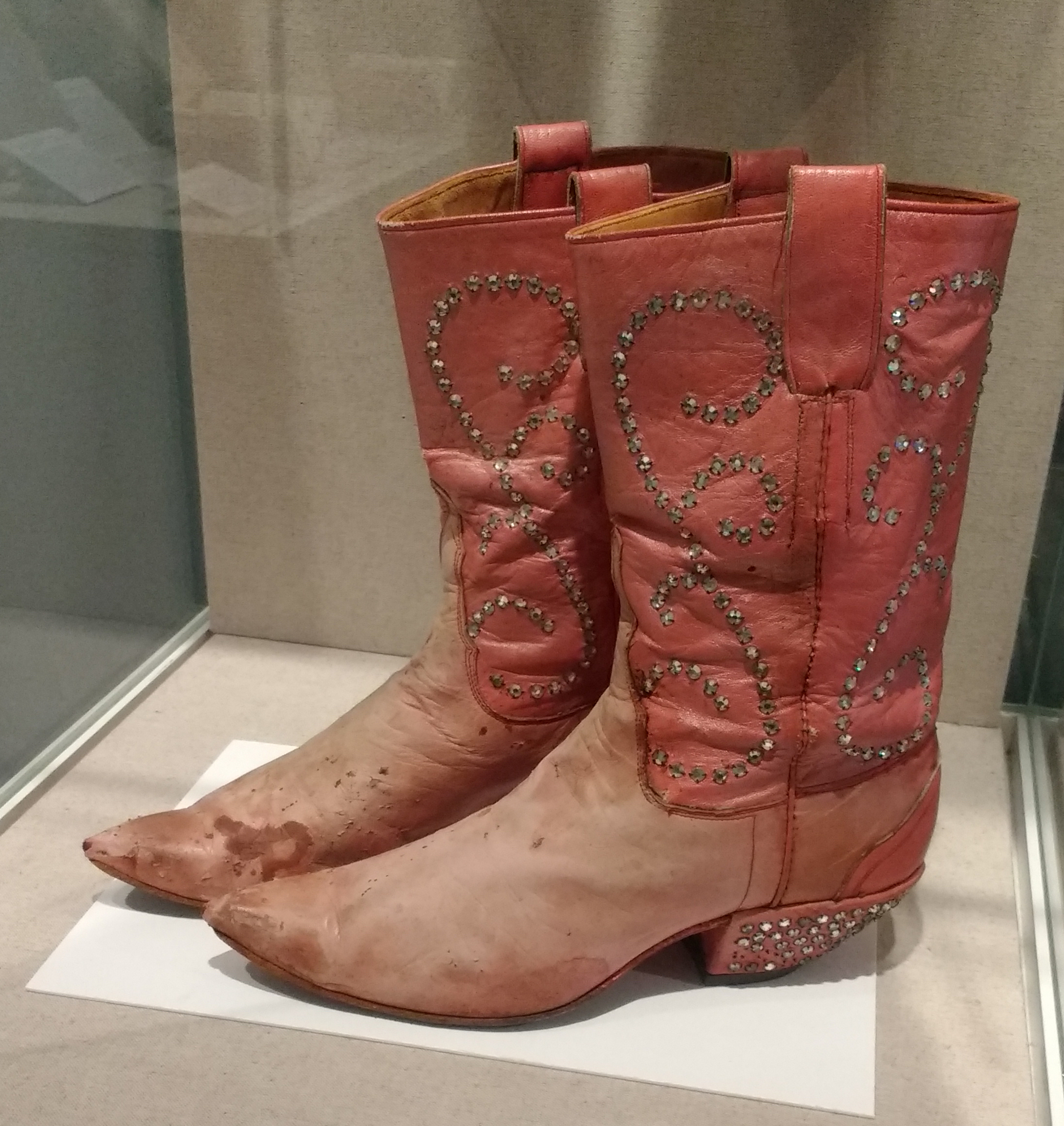
Evans' pink rhinestone cowboy boots

After beginning her career singing at the radio station where she was employed as a secretary, Evans had a productive career as a jazz, swing, and big band singer that led to a screen test and contract with 20th Century Fox studios. She gained exposure on radio as the featured singer for a time on the Edgar Bergen/Charlie McCarthy show. From 1936 to 1938, she landed a job as a singer for Dallas, Texas, radio station WFAA.

Throughout this early period, Evans went through two additional failed marriages, first with August Wayne Johns from 1929 to 1935; then with accompanist and arranger Robert Dale Butts from 1937 to 1946. Neither marriage produced children. During her time at 20th Century Fox, the studio promoted her as the unmarried supporter of her teenage "brother" Tommy (actually her son Tom Fox, Jr.), a deception that continued through her divorce from Butts in 1946 and her development as a cowgirl co-star to Roy Rogers at Republic Studios.

== Joint efforts ==
Dale Evans married Roy Rogers on New Year's Eve 1947 at the Flying L Ranch in Davis, Oklahoma, where they had earlier filmed the movie Home in Oklahoma.

The successful marriage was Rogers' third and Evans' fourth; the two were a team on- and off-screen from 1946 until Rogers' death in 1998. Together Roy and Dale raised their children in a Christian and musical home. Shortly after the wedding, Evans ended the deception regarding her son Tommy. Roy had an adopted daughter, Cheryl, and two biological children, Linda and Roy Jr. (Dusty), from his first marriage. Together they had one child, Robin Elizabeth, in 1950 who died of complications of Down syndrome shortly before her second birthday. Her life inspired Evans to write her bestseller Angel Unaware. Evans was influential in changing public perceptions of children with developmental disabilities and served as a role model for many parents. After she wrote Angel Unaware, a group then known as the "Oklahoma County Council for Mentally Retarded Children" adopted its better-known name Dale Rogers Training Center in her honor. She went on to write a number of religious and inspirational books, and she and Roy appeared many times with Billy Graham in Crusades all over the country, singing gospel songs and giving their testimony. Evans and Rogers adopted four other children: Mimi, Dodie, Sandy, and Debbie.

From 1951 to 1957, Evans and Rogers starred in the highly successful television series The Roy Rogers Show, in which they continued their cowboy and cowgirl roles, with her riding her trusty buckskin horse, Buttermilk. In addition to her successful TV shows, more than 30 films and some 200 songs, Evans wrote the song "Happy Trails". In later episodes of the program, she was outspoken in her Christianity, telling people that God would assist them with their troubles and imploring adults and children to turn to Him for guidance. In late 1962, the couple co-hosted a comedy-western-variety program, The Roy Rogers and Dale Evans Show.

In 1964, Evans spoke at a "Project Prayer" rally attended by 2,500 at the Shrine Auditorium in Los Angeles. The gathering, which was hosted by actor Anthony Eisley (star of ABC's Hawaiian Eye series) sought to flood the United States Congress with letters in support of mandatory school prayer, following two decisions in 1962 and 1963 of the United States Supreme Court which struck down mandatory prayer as conflicting with the Establishment Clause of the First Amendment to the United States Constitution.

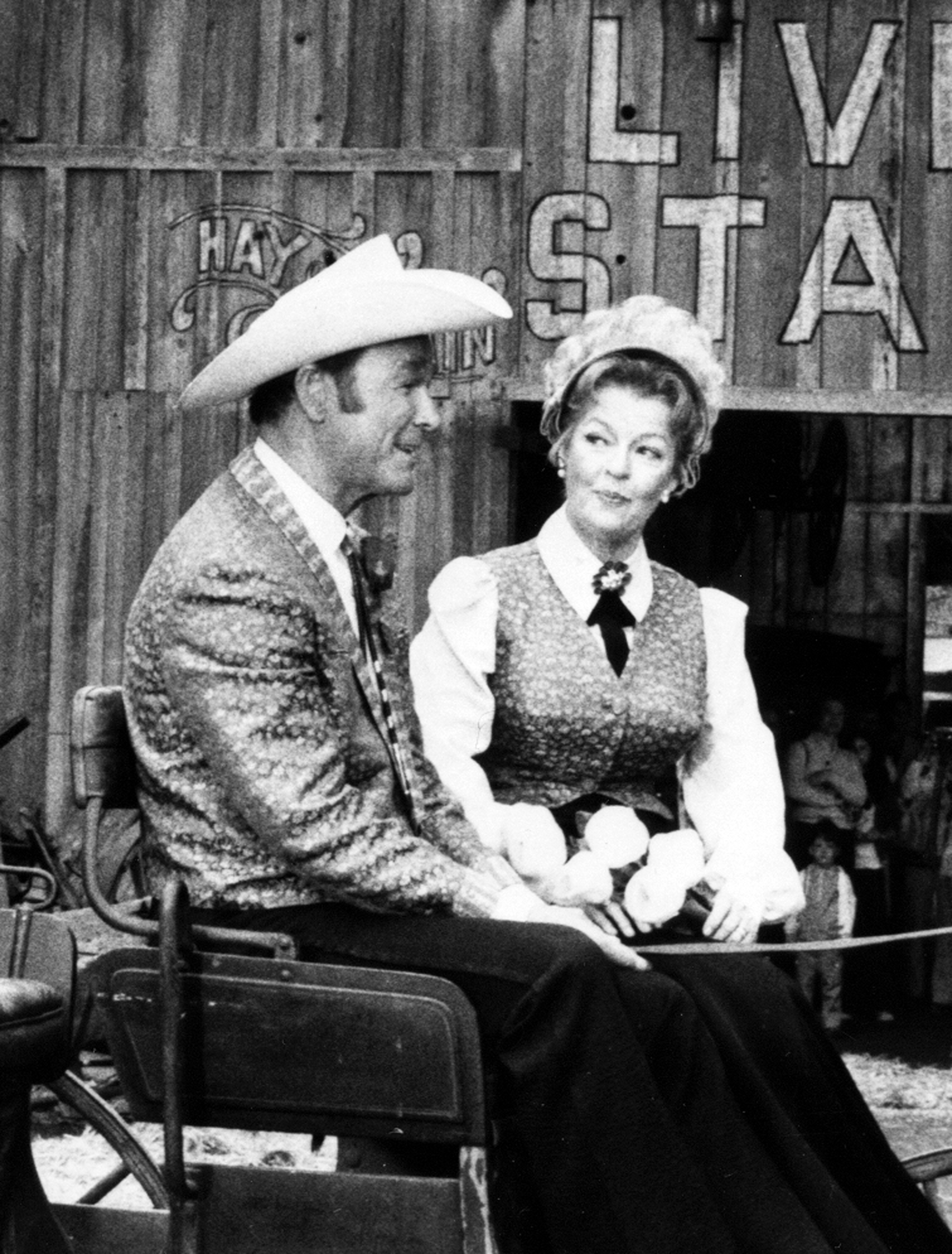
Roy Rogers and Evans at Knott's Berry Farm in the 1970s

Joining Evans and Eisley at the Project Prayer rally were Walter Brennan, Lloyd Nolan, Rhonda Fleming, Pat Boone, and Gloria Swanson. Evans declared, "It's high time that all America stood up to be counted. Let our children learn of the Lord and be free." Eisley and Fleming added that Rogers, John Wayne, Ronald Reagan, Mary Pickford, Jane Russell, Ginger Rogers, and Pat Buttram would have attended the rally had their schedules permitted.

Evans supported Barry Goldwater in the 1964 United States presidential election. In the 1970s, Evans recorded several solo albums of religious music. During the 1980s, the couple introduced their films weekly on the former The Nashville Network. In the 1990s, Evans hosted her own religious television program.

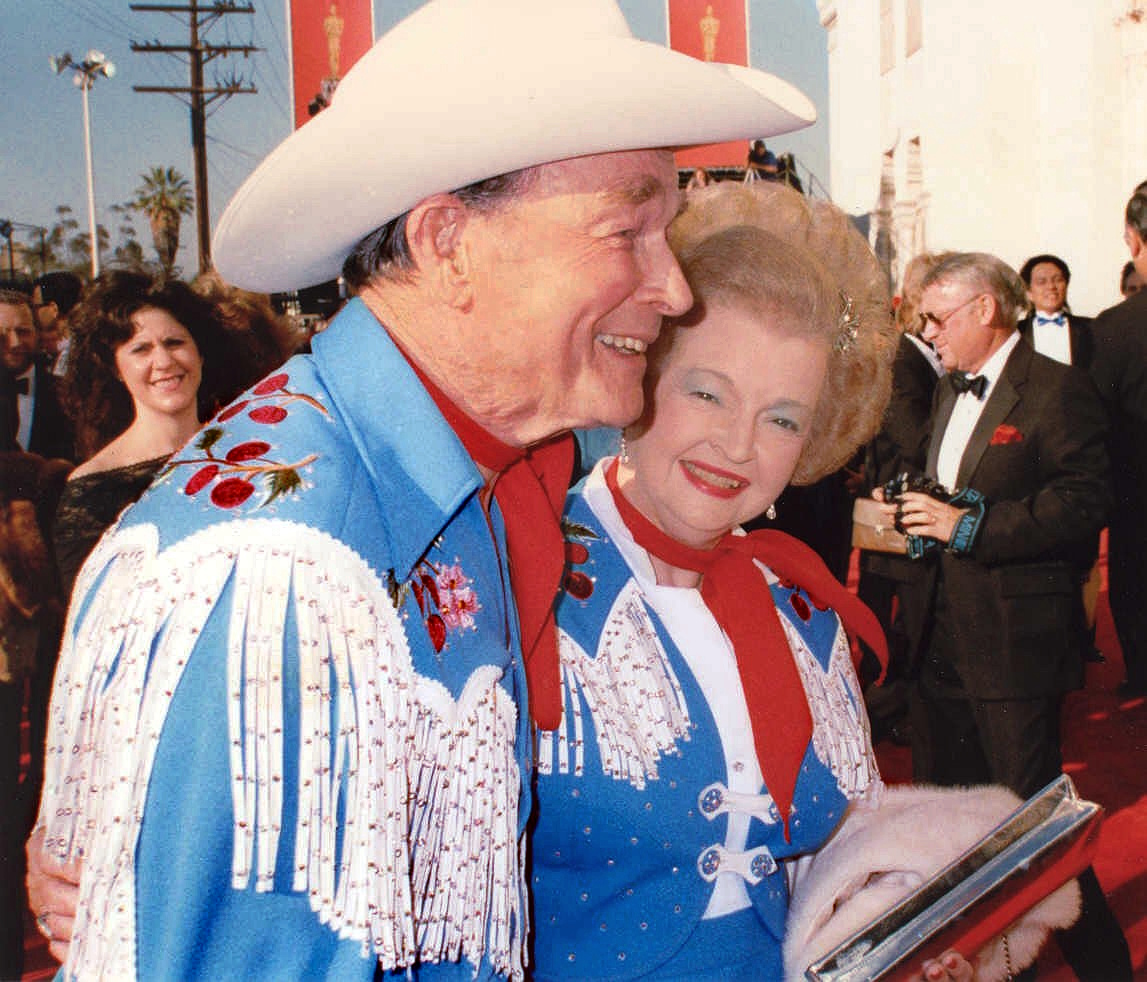
Evans (right) with Roy Rogers at the 1989 Academy Awards

== Death ==
Evans died of congestive heart failure on February 7, 2001, at the age of 88, in Apple Valley, California. She is interred at Sunset Hills Memorial Park in Apple Valley, next to Rogers.

== Legacy ==
For her contribution to radio, Evans has a star on the Hollywood Walk of Fame at 6638 Hollywood Blvd. She received a second star at 1737 Vine St. for her contribution to the television industry. In 1976, she was inducted into the Western Performers Hall of Fame at the National Cowboy & Western Heritage Museum in Oklahoma City, Oklahoma. In 1995, she was inducted into the National Cowgirl Museum and Hall of Fame in Fort Worth, Texas. In 1997, she was inducted into the Texas Trail of Fame. She ranked No. 34 on CMT's 40 Greatest Women in Country Music in 2002.

Cheryl Rogers-Barnett, a daughter of Roy Rogers and step-daughter of Evans, co-authored Cowboy Princess: Life with My Parents, Roy Rogers and Dale Evans with Frank Thompson.

In 2001, a Golden Palm Star on the Palm Springs Walk of Stars was dedicated to her and Roy Rogers. In 2018, she was inducted into the National Multicultural Western Heritage Museum.

== Selected filmography ==
- Orchestra Wives (1942)
- Girl Trouble (1942)
- Swing Your Partner (1943)
- The West Side Kid (1943)
- Hoosier Holiday (1943)
- Here Comes Elmer (1943)
- In Old Oklahoma (1943)
- Casanova in Burlesque (1944)
- Cowboy and the Senorita (1944)
- The Yellow Rose of Texas (1944)
- Song of Nevada (1944)
- San Fernando Valley (1944)
- Lights of Old Santa Fe (1944)
- The Big Show-Off (1945)
- Utah (1945)
- Bells of Rosarita (1945)
- The Man from Oklahoma (1945)
- Hitchhike to Happiness (1945)
- Along the Navajo Trail (1945)
- Sunset in El Dorado (1945)
- Don't Fence Me In (1945)
- Song of Arizona (1946)
- Rainbow Over Texas (1946)
- My Pal Trigger (1946)
- Under Nevada Skies (1946)
- Roll on Texas Moon (1946)
- Home in Oklahoma (1946)
- Out California Way (1946)
- Heldorado (1946)
- Apache Rose (1947)
- Bells of San Angelo (1947)
- The Trespasser (1947)
- Slippy McGee (1948)
- Susanna Pass (1949)
- Down Dakota Way (1949)
- The Golden Stallion (1949)
- Bells of Coronado (1950)
- Twilight in the Sierras (1950)
- Trigger, Jr. (1950)
- South of Caliente (1951)
- Pals of the Golden West (1951)

== Selected bibliography ==
- Angel Unaware (1953)
- The Answer Is God (1955)
- No Two Ways About It! (1963)
- Dearest Debbie (1965)
- Salute to Sandy (1967)
- The Woman at the Well (1970)
