= Stallion Canyon =

- Theatrical release poster
- Directed by: Harry L. Fraser
- Screenplay by: Hy Heath
- Produced by: H.R. Brandon; Robert L. Fenton
- Starring: Ken Curtis; Carolina Cotton; Shug Fisher; Forrest Taylor; Ted Adams; Billy Hammond
- Cinematography: Jack McCluskey
- Edited by: Ray Snyder
- Production company: Kanab Pictures Corporation
- Distributed by: Astor Pictures
- Release date: June 15, 1949
- Running time: 72 minutes
- Country: United States
- Language: English

Stallion Canyon is a 1949 American Western film directed by Harry L. Fraser and written by Hy Heath. The film stars Ken Curtis, Carolina Cotton, Shug Fisher, Forrest Taylor, Ted Adams and Billy Hammond. The film was released on June 15, 1949, by Astor Pictures.

== Cast ==
- Ken Curtis as Curt Benson
- Carolina Cotton as Ellen Collins
- Shug Fisher as Red
- Forrest Taylor as Tom Lawson
- Ted Adams as Wolf Norton
- Billy Hammond as Little Bear
- Roy Butler as Sheriff Breezy
- Alice Richey as Milly Collins
- L.H. Larsen as Steve
- Dick Hammer as Luke
- Clark Veater as Dobie
- D.C. Swapp as Judge Thompson
- Gail Bailey as Laramie
- Bud Gates as Idaho
- Bob Brandon as Johnny Adams
