= Conejo Valley Airport =

Former airport in Thousand Oaks, CA, US

Coordinates: 36.5210°N 119.6709°W

Conejo Valley Airport, also known as Janss Airport, was an airport in Thousand Oaks, California. It had a 2,600 ft (790 m) runway and was located adjacent to Thousand Oaks Boulevard. The airport opened in 1926, but was relocated in the early 1960s. The new airport, known as Rancho Conejo Airport, was established on the north side of State Highway 101. Various movies were filmed at Conejo Valley Airport, including The Paleface (1948), Riders of the Whistling Pines (1949) and Overland Stage Raiders (1938). Rancho Conejo Airport appeared in the film It's a Mad, Mad, Mad, Mad World (1963).
