= Ventura Farms =

Ranch in Thousand Oaks, California, US

- Location within California

General information
- Location: Hidden Valley, 235 W Potrero Rd, Thousand Oaks, California
- Coordinates: 34.1453°N 118.8892°W
- Owner: David H. Murdock

Ventura Farms, formally known as Deerwood Stock Farm and Kentucky Park Farms, is a historic estate that is located in the Hidden Valley near Thousand Oaks, California. Known for being a film location, the 2,200-acre (890 ha) ranch has been featured in a number of Western films and is still used for filming. Historically recognized for breeding thoroughbred horses, the ranch is situated at the east end of Lake Sherwood near the entrance to the Hidden Valley.

== History ==
The Deerwood Stock Farm was owned by J. C. Dellinger from prior to 1944 until 1978, when David H. Murdock, CEO of Dole Corporation, purchased it and renamed it Ventura Farms. Under his ownership, the property expanded to include features such as formal gardens, a 1,800-square-foot conservatory and unique architectural structures. The ranch may have been started by F. W. Matthiessen and given the original name Kentucky Park Farms. It was formerly property of Carleton F. Burke, California Horse Racing Board's first chairman.

== Architecture ==
The ranch consists of various gardens, such as an English Garden, Family Garden, Secret Garden, Arabian Division, etc. Also at the farm is a herd of Santa Gertrudis cattle, Kashmir sheep, Reindeer, Arabian horses, and around 800 Koi. Architectural features include the Sound of Water Pavilion, Japanese Tea House, Chinese Scholar House, Poet’s House, and an 1,800 square feet (170 m^{2}) conservatory housing 25,000 orchids.

== Breeding Program ==
Ventura Farms maintains a breeding program focused on Arabian horses. The program aims to preserve the characteristics of the Arabian breed. The farm houses stallions and mares selected for their conformation and lineage. Offspring are raised on-site and trained for various disciplines. The breeding program contributes to the farm's equestrian activities.

== In motion pictures and television ==
It was under Dellinger’s ownership that movies were first shot on the ranch. It has been featured in films and TV series such as:

Movies

- In Old Kentucky (1935)
- Under Fiesta Stars (1941)
- San Fernando Valley (1944)
- My Pal Trigger (1946)
- Trail to San Antone (1947)
- The Paleface (1948)
- Never a Dull Moment (1950)
- Sons of New Mexico (1950)
- Star Trek: Insurrection (1998)
- Memoirs of a Geisha (2005)

Television

- Dynasty (1981 TV series) (1984 - 1989 as Delta Rho stables)
- The X-Files (2001 episode "The Gift")
- 24 (2006)
- Agents of S.H.I.E.L.D. (2013-2020)
- Crisis (2014)
- Westworld (2016-)
- 9-1-1: Lone Star (2021)
