= Riders of the Whistling Pines =

1949 film by John English

- Theatrical release poster
- Directed by: John English
- Written by: Jack Townley
- Produced by: Armand Schaefer
- Starring: Gene Autry
- Cinematography: William Bradford
- Edited by: Aaron Stell
- Production company: Gene Autry Productions
- Distributed by: Columbia Pictures
- Release date: March 16, 1949 (U.S.)
- Running time: 70 minutes
- Country: United States
- Language: English

Riders of the Whistling Pines is a 1949 American Western film directed by John English and starring Gene Autry, Patricia Barry, and Jimmy Lloyd. Written by Jack Townley, the film is about a gang of outlaws who are destroying the timberland and who frame a singing cowboy on a cattle-poisoning charge, setting him up for murder.

== Plot ==
In the North Woods, Forester Charles Carter (Jason Robards Sr.) discovers that a tussock moth infection is threatening to devastate the great woods. This threatens the plans of Henry Mitchell (Douglass Dumbrille), who holds exclusive logging rights for the forest. Mitchell figures that if the moths infest and kill the trees, he can harvest all the dead trees, unencumbered by logging restrictions. When Carter tries to phone in the infestation threat, Mitchell covertly cuts the line, forcing Carter to ride into town to report the problem. Meanwhile, along the trail, Gene Autry (Gene Autry) and Forester Joe Lucas (Jimmy Lloyd), who have been drinking, come across a mountain lion, and Gene fires several shots at the wild animal. Mitchell, who has been following the forester, uses the last shot as cover to shoot Carter in the back, leaving him where Autry will assume Carter was killed by his errant shot.

At the inquest, Gene is cleared of any charges, and he is freed. He sells his interest in his forest camp, leaving the money to Carter's daughter, Helen (Patricia Barry). In grief, he decides to leave the area, but then discovers the moth infestation for himself. Reporting it to the forest service and discovering that his shot could not have killed Carter, he is hired to run a program of aerial spraying of DDT to kill the moth larva before the forest is destroyed. Gene includes his pal, Joe, in the aerial program, but Joe's problems with alcohol, triggered by the death of his wife, lead to trouble.

Meanwhile, Mitchell has hatched a plot to stop the DDT spraying by covertly spraying a very potent poison over the local livestock, blaming the resulting sickness and death on the DDT. Joe, who has returned to sobriety with the help of Autry, finds the plane and poison being used by Mitchell, but is shot by one of Mitchell's henchmen, Bill Wright (Damian O'Flynn), as he rides to report the problem. Helen finds Joe and, with the help of Dr. Chadwick (Harry Cheshire), brings him back from the brink of death. When Joe recovers consciousness, he reports his findings to Gene.

When he learns that Wright has aroused the locals to stop the spraying operation, Gene rides to intercept them before they can destroy the planes. He reports Wright's scheme, and convinces some of the locals to go with him to check it out. Wright has dismantled the plane, and when the locals leave, he captures Gene and Forester Jerry (Jerry Scoggins). They soon escape, however, and arrive at the airfield on time for a brawl to save the aircraft. The sheriff shows up, breaks up the fight, and confiscates everyone's weapons.

With the help of Helen and Dr. Chadwick, Gene makes Mitchell and Wright believe he is holding the bullet removed from the injured Joe, and that it will be traced to Wright's confiscated rifle. Mitchell, Wright, and Pete ride to confront Autry, with Mitchell dropping off at a shack along the way to ambush Gene, should he get away. Wright confronts Gene, and after more fighting, he gets away. Pete, however, is captured and leads Gene to a trap by telling him he can find Wright at the shack where Mitchell is waiting.

Later, Pete tries to cut a deal by confessing the truth. Joe realizes he will never catch up to Gene in time to save him, so he rides to the airfield to try an aerial intercept. Wright forces his way onto the plane at gunpoint to escape justice, but once in the air, Joe points out that if he is shot there is no one to fly the aircraft. Joe flies over Gene to warn him, and when that doesn't work, he selflessly crashes the plane into the shack, killing Wright, Mitchell, and himself. Gene returns to finish the spraying job, with the clear understanding that his future includes a permanent forestry job and married life with Helen.

== Cast ==
- Gene Autry as Gene Autry
- Patricia Barry as Helen Carter (credited as Patricia White)
- Jimmy Lloyd as Forester Joe Lucas
- Douglass Dumbrille as Henry Mitchell
- Damian O'Flynn as Henchman Bill Wright
- Clayton Moore as Henchman Pete
- Harry Cheshire as Dr. Daniel Chadwick
- Leon Weaver as Abner Weaver
- Jerry Scoggins as Forester Jerry, Guitar Player
- Fred S. Martin as Forester Freddie, Accordion player
- Bert Dodson as Forester Bert, Bass player
- The Pinafores as Singing Trio
- Beulah Kettle as Singing Sister
- Ione Kettle as Singing Sister
- Eunice Kettle as Singing Sister
- Lane Chandler as forestry officer (uncredited)
- Jason Robards Sr. as Forester Charles Carter (uncredited)
- Champion as Champion, Gene's Horse

== Production ==
=== Filming locations ===
- Big Bear Lake, Big Bear Valley, San Bernardino National Forest, California, United States
- Big Bear Valley, San Bernardino National Forest, California, United States
- Cedar Lake, Big Bear Valley, San Bernardino National Forest, California, United States
- Janss Conejo Ranch, Thousand Oaks, California, United States

The film used two filming locations in Thousand Oaks, California: Wildwood Regional Park (Janss Conejo Ranch) and the now defunct Conejo Valley Airport.

=== Soundtrack ===
- "It's My Lazy Day" (Smiley Burnette) by Gene Autry and The Cass County Boys
- "Toolie Oolie Doolie" (Vaughn Horton, A. Beul) by Gene Autry and The Cass County Boys
- "Hair of Gold" (Sunny Skylar) by Gene Autry and The Cass County Boys and The Pinafores
- "Let's Go" by Gene Autry and The Cass County Boys
- "Let's Go Roaming Around the Range" by The Cass County Boys
- "Every Time I Feel the Spirit" by Gene Autry and The Cass County Boys
- "Little Big Dry" (Billy Webster) by Gene Autry and The Cass County Boys

== See also ==
- Public domain film
- List of American films of 1949
- List of films in the public domain in the United States
