= Dale Rogers Training Center =

Dale Rogers Training Center (DRTC), a non-profit organization, is the oldest and largest community vocational training and employment center for individuals with disabilities in Oklahoma. With five locations in Oklahoma, Dale Rogers Training Center trains or employs 1100 people a year: more than 900 with disabilities.

== History ==
When the Dale Rogers Training Center (DRTC) opened in 1953, there were almost no services available to children with developmental disabilities. The families of approximately 20 children with mental retardation banded together to provide mutual support, day care and education. Although the organization incorporated as the "Oklahoma County Council for Mentally Retarded Children," it adopted its better-known name in honor of film star Dale Evans Rogers, one of the first advocates for persons with intellectual disability. She and her husband, Roy Rogers, became parents of a daughter, Robin Elizabeth who was born with Down syndrome. Robin died shortly before her second birthday. Dale wrote the inspirational bestseller Angel Unaware, chronicling the impact that Robin had on their lives. Dale and Roy both were very influential in changing public perceptions of children born with developmental disabilities and served as role models for many parents.

In the decades of the '60s and '70s awareness of the rights of individuals with disabilities grew and public schools were charged with providing education for children with disabilities. Federal and state legislation, such as the Rehabilitation Act of 1973, outlined programs to provide training and work opportunities in sheltered and community environments. During these years, Dale Rogers' programs and services continued to evolve in response to these changes and community need.

During the '80s and '90s Dale Rogers Training Center experienced a time of rapid growth. Currently, Dale Rogers provides training or employment to over 1,000 teenagers and adults and is the oldest and largest provider of community services to people with disabilities in Oklahoma. It offers a wide array of training programs and employment opportunities across the state.

== Prism Place ==
One of the things to distinguish Dale Rogers Training Center from most other non-profits is the fact that it self-funds portions of its operations as a product of providing jobs to those with disabilities. Prism Place, one division of DRTC, plays a particularly significant role in this.

In 1983 DRTC opened its own internal business, Prism Place, manufacturing custom-made acrylic awards. Through Prism Place, the agency's board of directors and executive director knew they were offering an important service to the community and at the same time laying a foundation for a better life for individuals with disabilities. Ten years into the manufacturing business, as Prism Place was growing by leaps and bounds, the board of directors decided to expand the product line by beginning to offer traditional wooden plaques and trophies. By 1994, Prism Place had outgrown its space. Two years later, a new building was opened to provide additional space to manufacture and display Prism Place products. Over twenty years after sending out the first order, things have not slowed down for Prism Place.

What distinguishes Prism Place from similar businesses is the fact that it not only creates trophies and awards, but also allows people with disabilities to contribute to society by earning their own way. Prism Place is one of Dale Rogers Training Center's multiple programs designed to meet the needs of Oklahomans with disabilities while also providing needed services to the business community. As in all areas of the agency, the focus within Prism Place is on the abilities of individuals with disabilities. The employed individuals are given the training and support they need to obtain and retain high quality jobs with employee benefits, get off federal assistance, earn a good wage, and become tax paying citizens.

== Programs and Services ==
The main programs and services provided by DRTC for individuals with disabilities include:
• A Special Needs program for persons with multiple disabilities,
• A School to Work Transition program in coordination with 7 different school districts,
• A Summer Daycamp program for teenagers and young adults with developmental disabilities,
• A Production Center and Vocational Training Program that provides paid work/training through outside subcontracts,
• A Mobile Workforce program that includes work at company worksites,
• Prism Place, where trophies and acrylic awards are produced by people with disabilities,
• A large Supported Employment program which places individuals into community jobs.

In addition, DRTC provides work opportunities to provide full food service employment and custodial jobs for people with disabilities at Tinker Air Force Base in Midwest City, OK. DRTC also implements custodial jobs for people with disabilities at the Federal Court House, downtown Post Office, and the Federal Building located in downtown Oklahoma City.
