= The Yellow Rose of Texas (film) =

1944 film

- Theatrical release poster
- Directed by: Joseph Kane
- Written by: Jack Townley (story and screenplay)
- Produced by: Harry Grey (associate producer)
- Starring: See below
- Cinematography: Jack A. Marta
- Edited by: Tony Martinelli
- Music by: R. Dale Butts; Marlin Skiles
- Distributed by: Republic Pictures
- Release date: June 24, 1944
- Running time: 69 minutes (original version); 54 minutes (edited version)
- Country: United States
- Language: English

The Yellow Rose of Texas is a 1944 American Western film directed by Joseph Kane and starring Roy Rogers and Dale Evans.

== Plot ==
Singing cowboy Roy Rogers is an insurance investigator sent to find a stash of money lifted from a company payroll. Under the guise of a performer on a showboat called "The Yellow Rose of Texas", Roy meets Betty Weston, the daughter of the falsely-accused Sam Weston, who has recently escaped from prison. Together, Roy and Betty set out to prove her father was wrongly accused and track down the real criminal.

== Cast ==
- Roy Rogers as Roy Rogers
- Trigger as Trigger Smartest Horse in the Movies
- Dale Evans as Betty Weston
- Grant Withers as Express Agent Lucas
- Harry Shannon as Sam Weston
- George Cleveland as Captain "Cap" Joe
- William Haade as Buster, Roy's Sidekick
- Weldon Heyburn as Charley Goss
- Hal Taliaferro as Ferguson
- Tom London as Sheriff Allen
- Dick Botiller as Indian Pete
- Janet Martin as Showboat Singer
- Bob Nolan as Singer
- Peter Lawman as Singer
- Sons of the Pioneers as Musicians

== Soundtrack ==
- "Western Wonderland" (Music by Ken Carson, lyrics by Guy Savage)
- "Lucky Me, Unlucky You" (Written by Charles Henderson)
- "Down in the Old Town Hall" (Charles Henderson)
- "The Timber Trail" (Written by Tim Spencer)
- "On a Show Boat" (Charles Henderson)
- "Song of the Rover" (Written by Bob Nolan)
- "Take It Easy" (Written by Xavier Cugat, Irving Taylor and Vic Mizzy)
- "A Two-Seated Saddle and a One-Gaited Horse" (Written by Tim Spencer)
- "The Yellow Rose of Texas" (Traditional)
- "Down Mexico Way" (Music by Jule Styne, lyrics by Sol Meyer and Eddie Cherkose)
- "Vira do minho" (Traditional)
