= Carolina Cotton =

American singer and actress

Background information
- Born: Helen Hagstrom; October 20, 1925; Cash, Arkansas, U.S.
- Died: June 10, 1997 (aged 71) Bakersfield, California, U.S.
- Occupations: Singer, actress

Carolina Cotton (October 20, 1925 – June 10, 1997) was an American singer and actress known as the "Yodeling Blonde Bombshell", the "Girl of the Golden West", and the "Queen of the Range."

== Early life ==
Cotton was born Helen Hagstrom October 20, 1925 in Cash, Arkansas, to a farming family who moved to San Francisco during the Great Depression. She took dancing classes and became a child singer, and gradually accompanied traveling shows.

== Career ==
At the age of 16, she was a high school student who would visit a radio station to watch Dude Martin's Roundup Gang. When the band's yodeler left to get married, Martin asked her whether she could yodel. She replied, "Sure I can! Why not?" — though she had never before yodeled. Martin nicknamed her "Carolina", reckoning that Arkansas was not as well recognized in California. The surname "Cotton" came later, when radio disc jockey Cottonseed Clark asked his listeners to suggest a stage name for the singer.

In April 1944, while in Hollywood to pick up costumes, she bumped into songwriter Johnny Marvin. He offered her a part in the Roy Acuff musical Sing, Neighbor, Sing for Republic Pictures. It was only a one-film deal, but it led to a kid-sister speaking part and a song specialty in the PRC feature I'm from Arkansas. In July 1944 she joined the cast of radio's Hollywood Barn Dance. She was then invited to join the Spade Cooley orchestra, where she doubled on bass fiddle. Cooley's other bassist was Deuce Spriggens (born George Braunsdorf); they got married in 1945 and left Cooley to form their own band, taking some of Cooley's personnel with them.

The marriage lasted only three months, but it was important to her career because she began making appearances with Spriggens in feature films for Columbia Pictures. Columbia signed her as an actress, and she appeared opposite the studio's cowboy stars Ken Curtis, Gene Autry, and Charles Starrett. She and Curtis also co-starred in an independent western filmed in Cinecolor, Stallion Canyon (1949), produced on location in Kanab, Utah. She said that she stopped making theatrical motion pictures only when the studios no longer made B westerns; with the retirement of Starrett in 1952, Columbia decided against making any more "program westerns".

Cotton hosted a program called Carolina Calls twice a week on the Armed Forces Radio Services in the late 1940s and early 1950s and made tours of Germany and Korea. She made various television appearances (a planned series, Queen of the Range never came to be), and she was featured opposite superstar western bandleader Bob Wills in a series of Snader Telescriptions, three-minute musical films made for television.

In October 1955 she changed her name legally to Carolina Cotton. She changed it again when she married William Ates, 27-year-old nephew of comedian Roscoe Ates, on July 15, 1956. The couple had two children, William and Sharon Marie, but the marriage ended in divorce.

Inspired by meeting many children around the world during her travels, Cotton decided to become a teacher, but still performed occasionally, especially at western film festivals. She retired from Mount Vernon Elementary School in Bakersfield, California, in early 1997, and died in June, after battling ovarian cancer for three years.
