= The Paleface (1948 film) =

1948 film by Norman Z. McLeod

- Theatrical poster
- Directed by: Norman Z. McLeod
- Written by: Edmund Hartmann; Frank Tashlin
- Produced by: Robert L. Welch
- Starring: Bob Hope; Jane Russell
- Cinematography: Ray Rennahan
- Edited by: Ellsworth Hoagland
- Music by: Victor Young
- Color process: Technicolor
- Production company: Paramount Pictures
- Distributed by: Paramount Pictures
- Release date: December 24, 1948
- Running time: 91 minutes
- Country: United States
- Language: English
- Budget: $2 million
- Box office: $4.5 million (U.S. and Canada rentals)

The Paleface is a 1948 American comedy Western film directed by Norman Z. McLeod and starring Bob Hope as "Painless Potter" and Jane Russell as Calamity Jane. In the movie, Hope sings the song "Buttons and Bows" (by Jay Livingston and Ray Evans). The song won the Academy Award for Best Original Song that year.

The film had a sequel, which is written and directed this time around by its co-writer Frank Tashlin, called Son of Paleface, in 1952. In 1968, Don Knotts remade the film as The Shakiest Gun in the West.

== Plot ==
Calamity Jane is busted out of a sheriff's jail by a couple of government agents under Governor Johnson and Commissioner of Internal Affairs Emerson. Johnson and Emerson wish to hire her to uncover white traders illegally selling guns to an Indian tribe near Buffalo Flats, one of the frontier areas; because the agents they previously sent to investigate have turned up dead, they feel they need a new approach and have conceived a plan to use Jane, both as a woman and skilled gunfighter. In return for her services, Johnson and Emerson offer her a full pardon for her past crimes.

The plan is for Jane to meet in Port Deerfield with Jim Hunter, another government agent, pose with him as a married couple, and join a settler's trek to the area where the gun running is taking place. However, the mastermind behind the gun smuggling is revealed to be Jasper Martin, Johnson's secretary. Jane finds Hunter dead and herself hounded by assassins. Evading an attempt on her life, she hitches a ride with Peter "Painless" Potter, a traveling dentist fleeing town following one of his habitual blunders, and marries him to maintain her cover and to coerce him into joining the wagon train. The gun smugglers also join, to ensure delivery of a stash of dynamite and to track the federal agent sent to thwart them, believing Potter is their target. After Potter mistakenly leads part of the wagon train into Indian territory, and while they are taking a rest at a log cabin, they are attacked by the Indians. Locked out, Potter hides inside a barrel and shoots wildly while Jane secretly takes out several Indians from inside. Potter is credited with this achievement, reinforcing the smugglers' assumptions.

After arriving in Buffalo Flats, Jane meets with her contact, Hank Billings, and tasks him to find out where the dynamite will be delivered. Meanwhile, the smugglers concoct a plan which results in Potter incurring the wrath of Big Joe, a bad-tempered gunslinger. When this clash leads to a duel, Jane initially plans to allow Potter to be killed, to throw off the smugglers, but instead ends up aiding him again because she wants to use him as a decoy and because she has begun to fall in love with him.

The same night, Billings reports to Jane that the conspirators have hidden the dynamite in the undertaker's shop, then dies from an arrow in his back. Jane manages to manipulate Potter into going to the undertaker's to scope out who comes to pick up the dynamite; she prepares to follow in his wake, but both are captured by the smugglers and taken to the Indians' camp, where Martin has arrived with the rest of his weapons shipment. In order to punish Potter for killing their braves, the medicine man prepares to have Potter ripped apart by two bent-down trees, but the contraption instead catapults Potter into the forest, leading to the medicine man being banished. While returning to the camp to free Jane, Potter comes upon the medicine man, knocks him out and takes his clothes as a disguise.

Ignorant about the medicine man's banishment, Potter prepares to free Jane when the tribesmen close in on him. Taking a powder flask, Potter strays through the camp, laying a powder trail that eventually ignites and blows up some of the smuggled weapons. In the confusion, Jane and Potter escape in Potter's wagon, which is loaded with the dynamite, with the Indians and smugglers on their tail. After Potter drops a lit dynamite stick, he and Jane abandon the wagon just as the smugglers reach it and get themselves blown up. With the mission accomplished, Jane and Potter embark on their honeymoon for real. As the film ends, Jane (in Potter's stead) falls victim to one of the film's running gags.

== Cast ==
- Bob Hope as Painless Potter
- Jane Russell as Calamity Jane
- Robert Armstrong as Terris
- Iris Adrian as Pepper (singing voice dubbed by Annette Warren)
- Bobby Watson as Toby Preston (as Robert Watson)
- Jackie Searl as Jasper Martin (as Jack Searl)
- Joseph Vitale as Indian Scout
- Charles Trowbridge as Gov. Johnson
- Clem Bevans as Hank Billings
- Jeff York as Big Joe
- Stanley Andrews as Commissioner Emerson
- Wade Crosby as Jeb
- Chief Yowlachie as Chief Yellow Feather
- Iron Eyes Cody as Chief Iron Eyes
- John Maxwell as Village gossip
- Tom Kennedy as Bartender
- Henry Brandon as Wapato (Medicine Man)
- Francis McDonald as Lance
- Frank Hagney as Greg
- Skelton Knaggs as Pete
- Olin Howland as Undertaker
- George Chandler as First Patient
- Nestor Paiva as Second Patient

== Production ==
The Paleface was filmed at the now-defunct Conejo Valley Airport and also at Deerwood Stock Farm, both in Thousand Oaks, California.

The Painless Peter Potter character was to some extent inspired by a real dentist named Painless Parker.

== Reception ==
The Paleface received mostly positive critical reviews and was a commercial success, earning $4.5 million in domestic rentals, which made it Paramount's most successful film of 1948.

Bosley Crowther of the The New York Times wrote that Hope delivered "another amusing run-through of well-worn slapstick routines", but that the film offered nothing new, commenting that the "words are slightly different, but the thoughts remain the same." He assessed it as "just a second-string "Road" show, at best, conspicuously lacking the presence of Bing Crosby and Dorothy Lamour." He was not impressed by Jane Russell and wrote that although "blessed by nature with certain well-advertised charms, [she] appears to be lacking completely a modest ability to act." He noted that the one "historic thing" about the film was that it was "the birthplace of "Buttons and Bows", although he decried that "it is tucked away, as though it were a thing of no consequence" and "brushed off in one casual chorus by—of all people!—Mr. Hope."

Variety gave a positive review, predicting "sturdy box office", and wrote that the film is "a smart-aleck travesty on the west, told with considerable humor and bright gags." They wrote of the performances that Hope "has been turned loose on a good script", supported by Jane Russell who proved to be "an able sparring partner for Hope's antics." Norman Z. McLeod was praised for his direction that "keeps the pace marching forward briskly", as was Victor Young "who backs the fun with an excellent score."

Harrison's Reports also gave a positive review and wrote that despite the "fact that there is little rhyme or reason to the threadbare plot", Bob Hope's fans would be amused by his "rib-tickling brand of clowning [which] keeps the action moving at a merry pace." They also wrote that Jane Russell "is very good in a sulky portrayal."

On review aggregator Rotten Tomatoes, the film holds a score of 100% based on 10 reviews, with an average rating of 6.8/10.

The film is recognized by American Film Institute in these lists:

- 2004: AFI's 100 Years...100 Songs:
  - "Buttons and Bows" – #87

The film is listed in the reference book 1001 Movies You Must See Before You Die.

== Radio adaptations ==
The Paleface was presented on Stars in the Air March 6, 1952. The 30-minute adaptation starred Bob Hope and Jane Russell recreating the roles they had in the film. Hope and Russell also starred in an adaptation on Screen Directors Playhouse on March 3, 1950.
