= Overland Stage Raiders =

1938 film

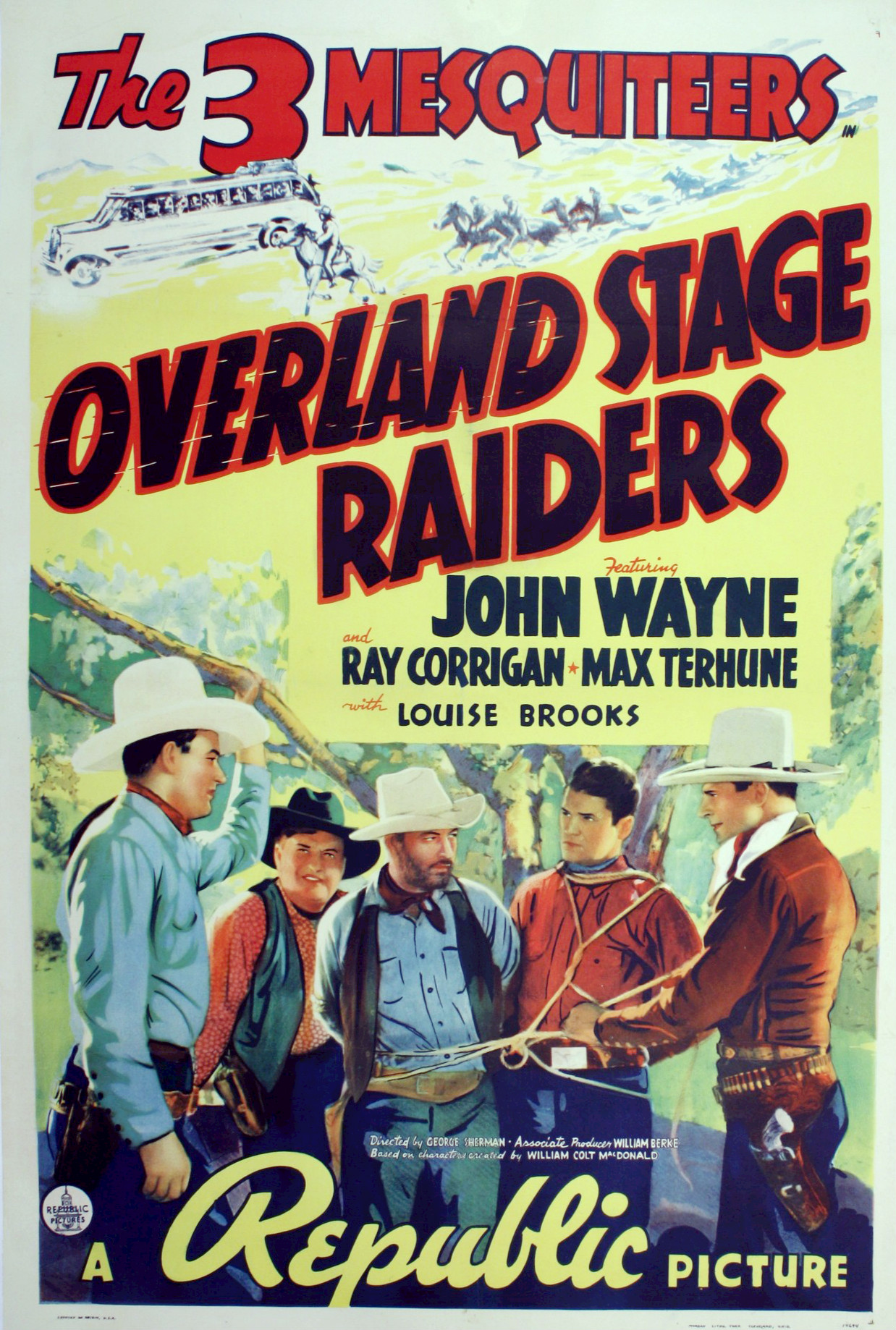
- Film poster
- Directed by: George Sherman
- Written by: Bernard McConville; Edmond Kelso
- Screenplay by: Luci Ward
- Based on: Based on characters by William Colt MacDonald
- Produced by: William A. Berke
- Starring: John Wayne; Ray Corrigan; Max Terhune; Louise Brooks
- Cinematography: William Nobles
- Edited by: Tony Martinelli
- Distributed by: Republic Pictures
- Release date: September 20, 1938
- Running time: 55 minutes
- Country: United States
- Language: English

Overland Stage Raiders is a 1938 "Three Mesquiteers" Western film starring John Wayne and directed by George Sherman. The film is notable for being the final film in which silent film icon Louise Brooks performed. Wayne played the lead in eight of the fifty-one films in the popular series.

Production of the film began on August 4, 1938. It was filmed on location at Iverson Movie Ranch in Chatsworth, Los Angeles, and at the now defunct Conejo Valley Airport in Thousand Oaks, California.

== Plot summary ==
After gold shipments from a mining town have been hijacked, the three Mesquiteers buy a plane to transport the gold. However, the owner of the shipping line brings in Eastern gangsters to thwart them. After the pilot makes an unexpected landing, the Mesquiteers search for the plane and its cargo.

== Cast ==
- John Wayne as Stony Brooke
- Ray Corrigan as Tucson Smith
- Max Terhune as Lullaby Joslin
- Louise Brooks as Beth Hoyt
- Elmer as Elmer (Lullaby's Dummy) (uncredited)
- Anthony Marsh as Ned Hoyt
- John Archer as Bob Whitney
- Gordon Hart as W. T.Mullins
- Roy James as Dave Harmon
- Olin Francis as Henchman Jake
- Fern Emmett as Ma Hawkins
- Henry Otho as Sheriff Mason
- George Sherwood as Henchman Clanton
- Arch Hall Sr. as Joe Waddell
- Frank LaRue as Hank Milton
- Edwin Gaffney as Gat (Eastern Gangster) (uncredited)
- Slim Whitaker as Pete Hawkins (uncredited)
- Chuck Baldra as Henchman (uncredited)
- Burr Caruth as Evans (uncredited)
- Curley Dresden as Rancher (uncredited)
- John Beach as Henchman (uncredited)
- Duke R. Lee as An Investor (uncredited)
- Tommy Coats as Henchman (uncredited)
- Bud McClure as Rancher (uncredited
- George Morrell as Rancher (uncredited)
- Yakima Canutt as Bus Driver (uncredited)
- Bud Osborne as Rancher (uncredited)
- Charles Brinley as Rancher (uncredited)
- Jack Kirk as Henchman (uncredited)
- Bill Wolfe as Rancher (uncredited)
- George Plues as Henchman (uncredited)
- Dirk Thane as Dutch (Eastern Gangster) (uncredited)
- Milton Kibbee as Airline Passenger (uncredited)
- Fred Burns as Rancher (uncredited)

== See also ==
- John Wayne filmography
