= Rainbow Over Texas =

1946 film by Frank McDonald

- Directed by: Frank McDonald
- Written by: Max Brand; Gerald Geraghty
- Produced by: Edward J. White
- Starring: Roy Rogers; George "Gabby" Hayes; Dale Evans
- Cinematography: Reggie Lanning
- Edited by: Charles Craft
- Music by: R. Dale Butts
- Production company: Republic Pictures
- Distributed by: Republic Pictures
- Release date: May 9, 1946
- Running time: 65 minutes
- Country: United States
- Language: English

Rainbow Over Texas is a 1946 American Western film in which Roy Rogers plays himself as a famous cowboy-singer returning to Texas. Directed by Frank McDonald from a story by Max Brand, it co-stars George "Gabby" Hayes and Dale Evans.

The self-portrayal of Roy Rogers as a more glamorous version of himself in Rainbow Over Texas revealed the great lengths to which Hollywood film studios would go in promoting their own film stars and made patently clear the self-referential advertising employed by studio productions in order to garner greater box office sales.

Since that time, "rainbow over Texas" has become a colloquialism for anyone who self-aggrandizes their own life in mythic and fantastical terms. For example, an individual who confabulates their previous experiences or resume out of either ignorance or self-importance is likened to a "rainbow over Texas".

The movie was shot on location near 426 W. Potrero Road in Thousand Oaks, California.

== Cast ==
- Roy Rogers as Roy Rogers
- George "Gabby" Hayes as Gabby Whittaker
- Dale Evans as Jackie Dalrymple
- Sheldon Leonard as Kirby Haynes
