= San Fernando Valley (film) =

1944 film by John English

- Directed by: John English
- Written by: Dorrell McGowan; Stuart E. McGowan
- Produced by: Edward J. White
- Starring: Roy Rogers; Dale Evans; Jean Porter; Andrew Tombes
- Cinematography: William Bradford
- Edited by: Ralph Dixon
- Music by: Mort Glickman
- Distributed by: Republic Pictures
- Release date: September 15, 1944
- Running time: 74 minutes
- Country: United States
- Language: English

San Fernando Valley is a 1944 American Western film directed by John English and starring Roy Rogers, Dale Evans and Jean Porter. The film was part of the long-running series of Roy Rogers films produced by Republic Pictures.

It was filmed at Deerwood Stock Farm (Kentucky Park Farms) and Hidden Valley in Thousand Oaks, California, with some car chase scenes filmed at nearby Iverson Ranch in the Simi Hills.

== Plot ==
Rancher Cyclone Kenyon lives with his two granddaughters—Dale, a responsible adult who runs practically everything; and Betty Lou, a boy-crazy bobbysoxer. Unfortunately, the ranch-hands would rather make music with Betty Lou than punch cattle, so Cyclone lets them go. Not that this improves things, because now there's the matter of replacing them. Dale does so—by hiring female ranch-hands. The women prove capable and lively, and all is well, notwithstanding Betty Lou who now has no one to flirt with—that is, until Roy and his sidekick Keno show up, begging for jobs. Cyclone hires them as cooks, which results in amateur-chef Roy giving everyone a case of Montezuma's Revenge. So that pretty much takes care of that. But soon Roy is in everyone's good stead, proving his worth as a two-fisted, cattle-ropin', ballad-singin' genius. Naturally, Betty Lou goes gaga, but it's Dale who falls in love.

A subplot is thrown in involving a foreman who skulks around the countryside, bilking people out of their money. At one point, he manages to steal every horse on Cyclone's ranch. But Trigger gallops to the rescue, hooves flying, trampling the thief. The stolen horses are retrieved and Cyclone agrees to hire back the male ranch-hands he fired, but only after pairing them off with one female ranch-hand each: otherwise, that oversexed vixen Betty Lou would never leave them alone.

== Cast ==
- Roy Rogers as himself
- Trigger (horse) as himself
- Dale Evans as Dale Kenyon
- Jean Porter as Betty Lou Kenyon
- Andrew Tombes as Cyclone Kenyon
- Charles Smith as Oliver Griffith
- Edward Gargan as Keno
- Dot Farley as Hattie O'Toole
- LeRoy Mason as Matt
- Vernon and Draper as Dance Act
- Morrell Trio as Skating Act
- Bob Nolan as Bob
- Sons of the Pioneers as Ranch Hands
- Doodles Weaver as Hot-Dog Vendor

== Bibliography ==
- Hurst, Richard M. Republic Studios: Beyond Poverty Row and the Majors. Scarecrow Press, 2007.
