= My Pal Trigger =

1946 film

- Original film poster
- Directed by: Frank McDonald
- Written by: Screenplay: Jack Townley; John K. Butler; Story: Paul Gangelin
- Produced by: Armand Schaefer (associate producer)
- Starring: Roy Rogers; Dale Evans; Jack Holt; George "Gabby" Hayes; Trigger; Bob Nolan
- Cinematography: William Bradford
- Edited by: Harry Keller
- Music by: R. Dale Butts; Mort Glickman; Charles Maxwell
- Production company: Republic Pictures
- Distributed by: Republic Pictures
- Release date: July 10, 1946 (United States)
- Running time: 79 minutes 54 minutes
- Country: United States
- Language: English

My Pal Trigger is a 1946 American Western musical film directed by Frank McDonald. The screenplay by Jack Townley and John K. Butler was based upon a story by Paul Gangelin. The film stars Roy Rogers, Dale Evans, George "Gabby" Hayes, Jack Holt, and Trigger in a story about the origin of Rogers' mount, and their deep and faithful bond. The film features several musical numbers for Rogers, Evans, and Bob Nolan and the Sons of the Pioneers.

It was filmed at Deerwood Stock Farm (Kentucky Park Farms) in Thousand Oaks, California.

== Cast ==
- Roy Rogers as Roy Rogers, a horse dealer and peddler of leather goods
- Trigger (horse) as Trigger, the son of Kendrick's Golden Sovereign and Roy's Lady
- George "Gabby" Hayes as Gabby Kendrick, owner of the Golden Horse Ranch and Golden Sovereign, a stallion
- Dale Evans as Susan Kendrick, his daughter
- Bob Nolan as Bob, a Kendrick ranch hand
- Sons of the Pioneers as musicians and Kendrick ranch hands
- Jack Holt as Brett Scoville, a wealthy rancher, horse breeder, and owner of the El Dorado casino and nightclub
- LeRoy Mason as Carson, Scoville's henchman
- Roy Barcroft as Hunter, Scoville's henchman
- Kenne Duncan as a croupier at Scoville's nightclub
- Sam Flint as the Sheriff of El Dorado County
- Ralph Sanford as Al, an auctioneer
- Francis McDonald as Pete, a storekeeper
- Harlan Briggs as Dr. Bentley, a veterinarian
- William Haade as Davis

== Music ==
- "She's Havin' Too Much Fun" (sung by Rogers and Evans)
- "Old Faithful" (sung by Rogers)

== See also ==
- List of films about horses
- List of films in the public domain in the United States
