= List of Republic Pictures films =

This page showcases a list of films produced and/or distributed by Republic Pictures, an American film distribution label owned by Paramount Global that previously used to be an independent film production and distribution company with studio facilities.

The label was used for two business/company incarnations prior to 2023; the first specialized in westerns, serials and B films emphasizing mystery and action during its original or first business incarnation from 1935 to 1967. On March 24, 2023, Paramount, whose previous prior incarnations, the first and second Viacom Inc. had a majority stake in during its second business incarnation, announced its revival as an acquisitions label for releasing titles acquired by its distribution arm, Paramount Global Content Distribution, similar to the distribution model of, amongst other companies, Sony's Stage 6 Films or MGM's American International Pictures.

== 1930s ==
=== 1935 ===
Release date	Title	Notes
Precursors
May 15, 1935	The Headline Woman	produced by Mascot Pictures
July 10, 1935	Born to Gamble	produced by Liberty Pictures
August 19, 1935	Westward Ho	distribution only
September 5, 1935	Tumbling Tumbleweeds	distribution only
September 12, 1935	Two Sinners	distribution only
September 24, 1935	The Crime of Dr. Crespi	produced by Liberty Pictures
Official formation
September 25, 1935	Cappy Ricks Returns	First official production
October 5, 1935	Forbidden Heaven	
October 5, 1935	The New Frontier	
October 9, 1935	The Spanish Cape Mystery	
October 21, 1935	Melody Trail	distribution only
October 22, 1935	1,000 Dollars a Minute	
November 4, 1935	Lawless Range	
November 19, 1935	Racing Luck	
December 2, 1935	Forced Landing	
December 2, 1935	The Sagebrush Troubadour	distribution only
December 3, 1935	Frisco Waterfront	
December 16, 1935	The Singing Vagabond	distribution only
December 28, 1935	Hitch Hike Lady	

=== 1936 ===
Release date	Title	Notes
January 18, 1936	The Oregon Trail	
January 20, 1936	Dancing Feet	
January 20, 1936	The Leavenworth Case	
February 15, 1936	The Lawless Nineties	
February 17, 1936	The Leathernecks Have Landed	
February 22, 1936	The Return of Jimmy Valentine	
March 2, 1936	Red River Valley	distribution only
March 4, 1936	Laughing Irish Eyes	
March 9, 1936	King of the Pecos	
March 27, 1936	Doughnuts and Society	
April 3, 1936	The House of a Thousand Candles	
April 13, 1936	Comin’ Round the Mountain	distribution only
April 14, 1936	Federal Agent	
April 18, 1936	The Harvester	
April 20, 1936	The Girl from Mandalay	
May 1, 1936	Frankie and Johnny	
May 11, 1936	The Singing Cowboy	distribution only
May 22, 1936	Burning Gold	
May 25, 1936	The Lonely Trail	
May 26, 1936	Hearts in Bondage	
May 30, 1936	Down to the Sea	
June 2, 1936	Navy Born	
June 16, 1936	Go-Get-'Em, Haines	
June 22, 1936	Guns and Guitars	distribution only
June 25, 1936	Ticket to Paradise	
July 6, 1936	Winds of the Wasteland	
August 11, 1936	Follow Your Heart	
August 15, 1936	The Gentleman from Louisiana	
August 19, 1936	Oh, Susanna!	distribution only
September 11, 1936	Sitting on the Moon	
September 13, 1936	Bulldog Edition	
September 22, 1936	The Three Mesquiteers	
September 24, 1936	Undercover Man	
September 28, 1936	The President's Mystery	
September 30, 1936	Ride Ranger Ride	distribution only
October 5, 1936	Cavalry	
October 26, 1936	Ghost-Town Gold	
November 9, 1936	Country Gentlemen	
November 16, 1936	The Big Show	distribution only
November 18, 1936	The Gun Ranger	
December 1, 1936	The Bold Caballero	
December 9, 1936	Roarin' Lead	
December 14, 1936	Happy Go Lucky	
December 21, 1936	Beware of Ladies	
December 21, 1936	The Old Corral	distribution only
December 23, 1936	The Mandarin Mystery	
December 28, 1936	A Man Betrayed	

=== 1937 ===
Release date	Title	Notes
January 4, 1937	Riders of the Whistling Skull	
January 11, 1937	Larceny on the Air	
January 25, 1937	Join the Marines	
February 15, 1937	The Gambling Terror	
February 15, 1937	Two Wise Maids	
February 22, 1937	Paradise Express	
February 28, 1937	Round-Up Time in Texas	distribution only
March 1, 1937	Circus Girl	
March 3, 1937	Hit the Saddle	
March 22, 1937	Bill Cracks Down	
March 24, 1937	Lightnin' Crandall	
March 27, 1937	Git Along Little Dogies	distribution only
March 29, 1937	Navy Blues	
March 29, 1937	Trail of Vengeance	
April 5, 1937	Jim Hanvey, Detective	
April 6, 1937	Lawless Land	
April 22, 1937	Bar-Z Bad Men	
April 26, 1937	The Hit Parade	
May 4, 1937	The Trusted Outlaw	
May 5, 1937	Gunsmoke Ranch	
May 12, 1937	Rootin' Tootin' Rhythm	distribution only
May 13, 1937	Guns in the Dark	
May 15, 1937	Michael O'Halloran	
May 18, 1937	Gun Lords of Stirrup Basin	
May 24, 1937	Affairs of Cappy Ricks	
May 24, 1937	Come on, Cowboys	
June 7, 1937	Border Phantom	
June 7, 1937	Dangerous Holiday	
June 14, 1937	Yodelin' Kid from Pine Ridge	distribution only
June 21, 1937	A Lawman Is Born	
June 21, 1937	Rhythm in the Clouds	
June 28, 1937	It Could Happen to You	
June 30, 1937	Range Defenders	
July 7, 1937	Doomed at Sundown	
July 12, 1937	Meet the Boyfriend	
July 19, 1937	The Red Rope	
July 31, 1937	Bulldog Drummond at Bay	
August 2, 1937	Boothill Brigade	
August 20, 1937	Sea Racketeers	
August 23, 1937	Public Cowboy No. 1	distribution only
September 1, 1937	Escape by Night	
September 1, 1937	Ridin' the Lone Trail	
September 6, 1937	Heart of the Rockies	
September 6, 1937	The Sheik Steps Out	
September 8, 1937	All Over Town	
September 24, 1937	Arizona Gunfighter	
October 4, 1937	Boots and Saddles	distribution only
October 4, 1937	Youth on Parole	
October 11, 1937	The Wrong Road	
October 18, 1937	The Trigger Trio	
November 8, 1937	Portia on Trial	
November 13, 1937	Springtime in the Rockies	distribution only
November 26, 1937	Manhattan Merry-Go-Round	
November 29, 1937	The Duke Comes Back	
December 6, 1937	The Colorado Kid	
December 6, 1937	Wild Horse Rodeo	
December 15, 1937	Glamorous Night	
December 20, 1937	Exiled to Shanghai	
December 22, 1937	Lady Behave!	
December 22, 1937	Mama Runs Wild	

=== 1938 ===
Release date	Title	Notes
January 11, 1938	Paroled - To Die	
January 24, 1938	The Purple Vigilantes	
January 29, 1938	The Old Barn Dance	distribution only
February 7, 1938	Outside of Paradise	
February 16, 1938	Born to Be Wild	
February 21, 1938	Hollywood Stadium Mystery	
March 1, 1938	Prison Nurse	
March 7, 1938	Call the Mesquiteers	
March 7, 1938	Thunder in the Desert	
March 18, 1938	King of the Newsboys	
March 28, 1938	Arson Gang Busters	
April 4, 1938	Invisible Enemy	
April 14, 1938	Outlaws of Sonora	
April 15, 1938	The Feud Maker	
April 18, 1938	Call of the Yukon	
April 20, 1938	Under Western Stars	
May 11, 1938	Romance on the Run	
May 23, 1938	Gangs of New York	
June 6, 1938	Desert Patrol	
June 13, 1938	Ladies in Distress	
June 15, 1938	Riders of the Black Hills	
July 4, 1938	Gold Mine in the Sky	distribution only
August 1, 1938	Heroes of the Hills	
August 6, 1938	A Desperate Adventure	
August 11, 1938	Army Girl	
August 15, 1938	Man from Music Mountain	distribution only
August 22, 1938	Tenth Avenue Kid	
August 22, 1938	Durango Valley Raiders	
August 28, 1938	Pals of the Saddle	
August 29, 1938	The Higgins Family	
September 4, 1938	Billy the Kid Returns	
September 20, 1938	Overland Stage Raiders	
October 1, 1938	The Night Hawk	
October 7, 1938	Prairie Moon	distribution only
October 8, 1938	Down in 'Arkansaw'	
October 29, 1938	I Stand Accused	
November 5, 1938	Rhythm of the Saddle	distribution only
November 14, 1938	Storm Over Bengal	
November 21, 1938	Come On, Rangers	
November 28, 1938	Santa Fe Stampede	
December 2, 1938	Western Jamboree	distribution only
December 5, 1938	Orphans of the Street	
December 22, 1938	Red River Range	
December 26, 1938	Federal Man-Hunt	
December 30, 1938	Shine On, Harvest Moon	

=== 1939 ===
Release date	Title	Notes
January 6, 1939	Fighting Thoroughbreds	
January 10, 1939	The Mysterious Miss X	
January 23, 1939	Pride of the Navy	
February 3, 1939	Home on the Prairie	distribution only
February 6, 1939	Woman Doctor	
March 6, 1939	I Was a Convict	
March 13, 1939	Rough Riders' Round-up	
March 19, 1939	Southward Ho	
March 27, 1939	Mexicali Rose	distribution only
April 12, 1939	Frontier Pony Express	
April 12, 1939	The Night Riders	
April 24, 1939	Forged Passport	
April 25, 1939	Street of Missing Men	
May 4, 1939	Blue Montana Skies	distribution only
May 12, 1939	Three Texas Steers	
May 15, 1939	Man of Conquest	
May 20, 1939	My Wife's Relatives	
May 26, 1939	The Zero Hour	
June 2, 1939	S.O.S. Tidal Wave	
June 9, 1939	Mountain Rhythm	distribution only
June 19, 1939	In Old Caliente	
June 27, 1939	Wyoming Outlaw	
July 3, 1939	Mickey the Kid	
July 12, 1939	She Married a Cop	
July 26, 1939	Should Husbands Work?	
July 31, 1939	Colorado Sunset	distribution only
August 6, 1939	Wall Street Cowboy	
August 10, 1939	New Frontier	
August 14, 1939	In Old Monterey	distribution only
August 21, 1939	Smuggled Cargo	
August 28, 1939	Flight at Midnight	
September 20, 1939	Calling All Marines	
September 29, 1939	The Arizona Kid	
October 6, 1939	The Kansas Terrors	
October 13, 1939	Sabotage	
October 27, 1939	Jeepers Creepers	
November 3, 1939	Main Street Lawyer	
November 10, 1939	The Covered Trailer	
November 16, 1939	Rovin' Tumbleweeds	distribution only
November 17, 1939	Saga of Death Valley	
November 29, 1939	Cowboys from Texas	
December 15, 1939	South of the Border	distribution only
December 20, 1939	Days of Jesse James	
December 31, 1939	Money to Burn	

== 1940s ==
=== 1940 ===
Release date	Title	Notes
January 12, 1940	Heroes of the Saddle	
January 23, 1940	Wolf of New York	
January 30, 1940	Village Barn Dance	
March 12, 1940	Pioneers of the West	
March 15, 1940	Forgotten Girls	
March 22, 1940	Rancho Grande	distribution only
March 26, 1940	Ghost Valley Raiders	
April 12, 1940	Young Buffalo Bill	
April 14, 1940	Grandpa Goes to Town	
April 15, 1940	Dark Command	
April 17, 1940	In Old Missouri	
April 22, 1940	Covered Wagon Days	
May 10, 1940	Gaucho Serenade	distribution only
May 10, 1940	The Crooked Road	
May 19, 1940	Gangs of Chicago	
May 24, 1940	Rocky Mountain Rangers	
June 6, 1940	Women in War	
June 19, 1940	Wagons Westward	
June 25, 1940	Grand Ole Opry	
June 29, 1940	One Man's Law	
July 1, 1940	The Carson City Kid	
July 3, 1940	Three Faces West	
July 15, 1940	Carolina Moon	distribution only
July 20, 1940	Scatterbrain	
July 30, 1940	The Ranger and the Lady	
July 30, 1940	Girl from God's Country	
August 10, 1940	Sing, Dance, Plenty Hot	
August 16, 1940	The Tulsa Kid	
August 29, 1940	Oklahoma Renegades	
August 31, 1940	Earl of Puddlestone	
September 6, 1940	Ride, Tenderfoot, Ride	distribution only
September 11, 1940	Girl from Havana	
September 15, 1940	Colorado	
September 30, 1940	Under Texas Skies	
October 6, 1940	Barnyard Follies	
October 10, 1940	Frontier Vengeance	
October 11, 1940	Melody and Moonlight	
October 15, 1940	Hit Parade of 1941	
October 21, 1940	Young Bill Hickok	
November 1, 1940	Who Killed Aunt Maggie?	
November 11, 1940	The Trail Blazers	
November 15, 1940	Melody Ranch	distribution only Inducted into the National Film Registry in 2002
November 17, 1940	Friendly Neighbors	
November 22, 1940	Texas Terrors	
November 29, 1940	Meet the Missus	
December 5, 1940	The Border Legion	
December 20, 1940	Behind the News	
December 23, 1940	Lone Star Raiders	
December 27, 1940	Bowery Boy	

=== 1941 ===
Release date	Title	Notes
January 6, 1941	Wyoming Wildcat	
January 14, 1941	Robin Hood of the Pecos	
January 24, 1941	Ridin' on a Rainbow	distribution only
January 28, 1941	Arkansas Judge	
January 31, 1941	Petticoat Politics	
February 14, 1941	The Phantom Cowboy	
February 16, 1941	Prairie Pioneers	
February 28, 1941	The Great Train Robbery	
March 7, 1941	A Man Betrayed	
March 14, 1941	Back in the Saddle	distribution only
March 27, 1941	Mr. District Attorney	
April 4, 1941	In Old Cheyenne	
April 8, 1941	Pals of the Pecos	
April 10, 1941	Two Gun Sheriff	
April 12, 1941	Sis Hopkins	
April 17, 1941	Rookies on Parade	
April 22, 1941	Lady from Louisiana	
April 26, 1941	The Singing Hill	distribution only
May 5, 1941	Country Fair	
May 7, 1941	Sheriff of Tombstone	
May 12, 1941	The Gay Vagabond	
May 16, 1941	Saddlemates	
May 24, 1941	Desert Bandit	
May 27, 1941	Angels with Broken Wings	
June 20, 1941	Nevada City	
June 24, 1941	Kansas Cyclone	
June 25, 1941	Puddin' Head	
July 10, 1941	Gangs of Sonora	
July 12, 1941	Mountain Moonlight	
July 15, 1941	Sunset in Wyoming	distribution only
July 20, 1941	Hurricane Smith	
July 24, 1941	Citadel of Crime	
July 31, 1941	Rags to Riches	
August 20, 1941	Ice-Capades	
August 25, 1941	Under Fiesta Stars	distribution only
August 29, 1941	The Pittsburgh Kid	
September 5, 1941	Bad Man of Deadwood	
September 10, 1941	Outlaws of Cherokee Trail	
September 12, 1941	The Apache Kid	
September 22, 1941	Doctors Don't Tell	
September 26, 1941	Death Valley Outlaws	
September 30, 1941	Sailors on Leave	
October 10, 1941	Mercy Island	
October 15, 1941	Down Mexico Way	distribution only
October 17, 1941	Jesse James at Bay	
October 24, 1941	Gauchos of El Dorado	
October 30, 1941	Public Enemies	
November 10, 1941	The Devil Pays Off	
November 12, 1941	Sierra Sue	distribution only
November 25, 1941	Tuxedo Junction	
November 25, 1941	A Missouri Outlaw	
December 12, 1941	Red River Valley	
December 15, 1941	West of Cimarron	
December 18, 1941	Mr. District Attorney in the Carter Case	

=== 1942 ===
Release date	Title	Notes
January 5, 1942	Lady for a Night	
January 13, 1942	Arizona Terrors	
January 16, 1942	Man from Cheyenne	
January 26, 1942	Pardon My Stripes	
January 30, 1942	Code of the Outlaw	
January 30, 1942	Cowboy Serenade	distribution only
February 2, 1942	A Tragedy at Midnight	
February 17, 1942	South of Santa Fe	
March 5, 1942	Sleepytime Gal	
March 6, 1942	Stagecoach Express	
March 11, 1942	Heart of the Rio Grande	distribution only
March 13, 1942	Yokel Boy	
March 18, 1942	Raiders of the Range	
March 25, 1942	Jesse James, Jr.	
March 26, 1942	Shepherd of the Ozarks	
March 27, 1942	The Affairs of Jimmy Valentine	
April 1, 1942	Sunset on the Desert	
April 16, 1942	The Girl from Alaska	
April 24, 1942	Westward Ho	
April 29, 1942	Home in Wyomin'	distribution only
May 18, 1942	Romance on the Range	
May 18, 1942	Remember Pearl Harbor	
May 25, 1942	Stardust on the Sage	distribution only
May 31, 1942	In Old California	
May 31, 1942	The Cyclone Kid	
June 10, 1942	Moonlight Masquerade	
June 16, 1942	The Phantom Plainsmen	
July 2, 1942	Sons of the Pioneers	
July 15, 1942	Joan of Ozark	
July 27, 1942	Hi, Neighbor	
July 31, 1942	The Sombrero Kid	
August 17, 1942	Call of the Canyon	distribution only
August 17, 1942	The Old Homestead	
August 24, 1942	Shadows on the Sage	
September 14, 1942	Sunset Serenade	
September 15, 1942	Bells of Capistrano	distribution only
October 8, 1942	Flying Tigers	
October 24, 1942	Youth on Parade	
October 27, 1942	Outlaws of Pine Ridge	
November 4, 1942	X Marks the Spot	
November 13, 1942	Valley of Hunted Men	
November 16, 1942	Heart of the Golden West	
December 16, 1942	The Traitor Within	
December 18, 1942	Secrets of the Underground	
December 24, 1942	Ice-Capades Revue	
December 28, 1942	The Sundown Kid	
December 30, 1942	Ridin' Down the Canyon	
December 31, 1942	Johnny Doughboy	

=== 1943 ===
Release date	Title	Notes
January 8, 1943	Mountain Rhythm	
January 15, 1943	London Blackout Murders	
January 25, 1943	Thundering Trails	
February 12, 1943	Dead Man's Gulch	
March 3, 1943	Carson City Cyclone	
March 10, 1943	Idaho	
March 12, 1943	The Blocked Trail	
March 12, 1943	The Purple V	
March 26, 1943	Hit Parade of 1943	
April 6, 1943	Tahiti Honey	
April 9, 1943	King of the Cowboys	
April 13, 1943	The Mantrap	
April 16, 1943	Santa Fe Scouts	
April 20, 1943	Shantytown	
April 27, 1943	Chatterbox	
April 30, 1943	Calling Wild Bill Elliott	
May 1, 1943	Daredevils of the West	
May 10, 1943	A Gentle Gangster	
May 15, 1943	Days of Old Cheyenne	
May 20, 1943	Swing Your Partner	
May 21, 1943	Riders of the Rio Grande	
May 28, 1943	False Faces	
June 11, 1943	The Man from Thunder River	
June 14, 1943	Song of Texas	
July 1, 1943	Fugitive from Sonora	
July 5, 1943	Thumbs Up	
July 8, 1943	Bordertown Gun Fighters	
July 29, 1943	The Saint Meets the Tiger	
August 12, 1943	Silver Spurs	
August 15, 1943	Black Hills Express	
August 18, 1943	Beyond the Last Frontier	
August 19, 1943	Wagon Tracks West	
August 21, 1943	Someone to Remember	
August 23, 1943	The West Side Kid	
August 26, 1943	Headin' for God's Country	
August 27, 1943	Nobody's Darling	
September 5, 1943	Sleepy Lagoon	
September 13, 1943	Hoosier Holiday	
October 15, 1943	A Scream in the Dark	
October 18, 1943	The Man from the Rio Grande	
October 30, 1943	The Man from Music Mountain	
November 13, 1943	Here Comes Elmer	
November 20, 1943	Overland Mail Robbery	
November 22, 1943	The Deerslayer	
November 23, 1943	Mystery Broadcast	
November 24, 1943	Death Valley Manhunt	
November 24, 1943	Canyon City	
December 6, 1943	In Old Oklahoma	distribution only
December 15, 1943	Pistol Packin' Mama	
December 29, 1943	California Joe	
December 30, 1943	Whispering Footsteps	
December 30, 1943	Raiders of Sunset Pass	
December 31, 1943	O, My Darling Clementine	

=== 1944 ===
Release date	Title	Notes
January 5, 1944	Hands Across the Border	
January 5, 1944	Pride of the Plains	
January 27, 1944	The Fighting Seabees	
February 19, 1944	Casanova in Burlesque	
March 3, 1944	Beneath Western Skies	
March 19, 1944	Mojave Firebrand	
March 28, 1944	My Best Gal	
April 2, 1944	Hidden Valley Outlaws	
April 3, 1944	The Laramie Trail	
April 4, 1944	Outlaws of Santa Fe	
April 7, 1944	Call of the South Seas	
April 9, 1944	Rosie the Riveter	
April 17, 1944	The Lady and the Monster	
April 24, 1944	Trocadero	
May 5, 1944	Jamboree	
May 13, 1944	Cowboy and the Senorita	
May 14, 1944	Tucson Raiders	
May 27, 1944	The Tiger Woman	
June 9, 1944	Silent Partner	
June 15, 1944	Man from Frisco	
June 17, 1944	Goodnight, Sweetheart	
June 24, 1944	The Yellow Rose of Texas	
July 2, 1944	Marshal of Reno	
July 14, 1944	Call of the Rockies	
July 20, 1944	Silver City Kid	
July 26, 1944	Secrets of Scotland Yard	
July 31, 1944	Three Little Sisters	
August 5, 1944	Song of Nevada	
August 5, 1944	The Girl Who Dared	
August 11, 1944	Bordertown Trail	
August 12, 1944	Sing, Neighbor, Sing	
August 13, 1944	The Port of 40 Thieves	
August 16, 1944	The San Antonio Kid	distribution only
September 12, 1944	Strangers in the Night	
September 14, 1944	That's My Baby!	
September 15, 1944	San Fernando Valley	
September 15, 1944	Stagecoach to Monterey	
September 15, 1944	Atlantic City	
September 30, 1944	Cheyenne Wildcat	
October 6, 1944	Code of the Prairie	
October 12, 1944	My Buddy	
October 16, 1944	Storm Over Lisbon	
November 6, 1944	Lights of Old Santa Fe	
November 10, 1944	End of the Road	
November 7, 1944	Sheriff of Sundown	
November 15, 1944	Vigilantes of Dodge City	
November 30, 1944	Faces in the Fog	
November 30, 1944	Brazil	
December 1, 1944	Firebrands of Arizona	
December 23, 1944	Thoroughbreds	
December 23, 1944	Lake Placid Serenade	
December 30, 1944	The Big Bonanza	
December 31, 1944	Sheriff of Las Vegas	

=== 1945 ===
Release date	Title	Notes
January 16, 1945	Grissly's Millions	
January 22, 1945	The Big Show-Off	
January 26, 1945	The Topeka Terror	
February 15, 1945	Great Stagecoach Robbery	
February 19, 1945	A Song for Miss Julie	
February 28, 1945	Sheriff of Cimarron	
March 21, 1945	Utah	
March 30, 1945	The Great Flamarion	
April 2, 1945	Identity Unknown	
April 5, 1945	Earl Carroll Vanities	
April 20, 1945	Corpus Christi Bandits	
May 10, 1945	The Phantom Speaks	
May 20, 1945	Lone Texas Ranger	
May 21, 1945	The Vampire's Ghost	
May 23, 1945	Three's a Crowd	
May 28, 1945	Flame of Barbary Coast	
June 2, 1945	Santa Fe Saddlemates	
June 4, 1945	A Sporting Chance	
June 19, 1945	Bells of Rosarita	
June 29, 1945	The Chicago Kid	
July 1, 1945	The Man from Oklahoma	
July 3, 1945	Gangs of the Waterfront	
July 9, 1945	Steppin' in Society	
July 10, 1945	Road to Alcatraz	
July 11, 1945	Trail of Kit Carson	
July 14, 1945	Oregon Trail	
July 14, 1945	The Cheaters	
July 16, 1945	Hitchhike to Happiness	
July 23, 1945	Jealousy	
August 16, 1945	Tell It to a Star	
September 1, 1945	Swingin' on a Rainbow	
September 7, 1945	Phantom of the Plains	
September 10, 1945	Behind City Lights	
September 14, 1945	Bandits of the Badlands	
September 15, 1945	Along the Navajo Trail	
September 15, 1945	The Fatal Witness	
September 15, 1945	Love, Honor and Goodbye	
September 20, 1945	Scotland Yard Investigator	
September 29, 1945	Sunset in El Dorado	
October 7, 1945	Marshal of Laredo	
October 20, 1945	Don't Fence Me In	
November 1, 1945	Rough Riders of Cheyenne	
November 2, 1945	Girls of the Big House	
November 14, 1945	Colorado Pioneers	
November 15, 1945	Mexicana	
November 16, 1945	The Tiger Woman	
November 17, 1945	Captain Tugboat Annie	
November 27, 1945	An Angel Comes to Brooklyn	
December 13, 1945	The Cherokee Flash	
December 13, 1945	The Woman Who Came Back	
December 21, 1945	Wagon Wheels Westward	
December 25, 1945	Dakota	
December 28, 1945	Song of Mexico	

=== 1946 ===
Release date	Title	Notes
January 25, 1946	Gay Blades	
January 27, 1946	A Guy Could Change	
February 2, 1946	Days of Buffalo Bill	
February 4, 1946	California Gold Rush	
February 16, 1946	The Madonna's Secret	
February 28, 1946	Crime of the Century	
March 9, 1946	Song of Arizona	
March 16, 1946	Strange Impersonation	
March 29, 1946	Sheriff of Redwood Valley	
April 10, 1946	Murder in the Music Hall	
April 11, 1946	The Undercover Woman	
April 17, 1946	Alias Billy the Kid	
April 18, 1946	Home on the Range	
April 20, 1946	The Catman of Paris	
April 27, 1946	The Glass Alibi	
May 9, 1946	Rainbow Over Texas	
May 10, 1946	Sun Valley Cyclone	
May 11, 1946	Passkey to Danger	
May 12, 1946	Winter Wonderland	
May 18, 1946	The French Key	
May 22, 1946	The El Paso Kid	
May 24, 1946	Valley of the Zombies	
May 31, 1946	In Old Sacramento	
June 8, 1946	One Exciting Week	
June 15, 1946	Man from Rainbow Valley	
June 28, 1946	Traffic in Crime	
July 5, 1946	Specter of the Rose	
July 10, 1946	My Pal Trigger	distribution only
July 12, 1946	Night Train to Memphis	
July 22, 1946	Rendezvous with Annie	
July 23, 1946	Red River Renegades	
July 29, 1946	Conquest of Cheyenne	
August 7, 1946	The Inner Circle	
August 9, 1946	The Last Crooked Mile	
August 12, 1946	G.I. War Brides	
August 19, 1946	The Invisible Informer	
August 22, 1946	Earl Carroll Sketchbook	
August 26, 1946	Under Nevada Skies	
September 3, 1946	The Mysterious Mr. Valentine	
September 9, 1946	Rio Grande Raiders	
September 12, 1946	Roll on Texas Moon	
October 18, 1946	Home in Oklahoma	
November 7, 1946	The Magnificent Rogue	
November 11, 1946	Plainsman and the Lady	
November 15, 1946	Santa Fe Uprising	
November 18, 1946	Affairs of Geraldine	
November 21, 1946	Sioux City Sue	distribution only
December 2, 1946	I've Always Loved You	
December 5, 1946	Out California Way	First Trucolor film
December 15, 1946	Heldorado	
December 15, 1946	The Fabulous Suzanne	
December 23, 1946	Stagecoach to Denver	
December 23, 1946	That Brennan Girl	

=== 1947 ===
Release date	Title	Notes
January 22, 1947	The Pilgrim Lady	
January 25, 1947	Trail to San Antone	distribution only
January 31, 1947	Calendar Girl	
February 1, 1947	Last Frontier Uprising	
February 15, 1947	Angel and the Badman	
February 15, 1947	Apache Rose	
February 15, 1947	Vigilantes of Boomtown	
March 8, 1947	The Ghost Goes Wild	
March 22, 1947	Hit Parade of 1947	
April 1, 1947	Homesteaders of Paradise Valley	
April 1, 1947	Twilight on the Rio Grande	distribution only
April 1, 1947	Yankee Fakir	
April 15, 1947	Bells of San Angelo	
April 24, 1947	Spoilers of the North	
May 5, 1947	Oregon Trail Scouts	
May 15, 1947	That's My Gal	
June 1, 1947	That's My Man	
June 6, 1947	Saddle Pals	distribution only
June 10, 1947	Web of Danger	
June 25, 1947	Northwest Outpost	
July 1, 1947	Rustlers of Devil's Canyon	
July 3, 1947	The Trespasser	
July 15, 1947	Robin Hood of Texas	distribution only
July 15, 1947	Springtime in the Sierras	
July 24, 1947	Blackmail	
July 28, 1947	Wyoming	
August 13, 1947	The Pretender	
August 15, 1947	Marshal of Cripple Creek	
August 30, 1947	Along the Oregon Trail	
September 8, 1947	Exposed	
September 15, 1947	Driftwood	
October 1, 1947	The Wild Frontier	
October 15, 1947	On the Old Spanish Trail	
November 9, 1947	The Fabulous Texan	
November 24, 1947	The Flame	
December 15, 1947	Bandits of Dark Canyon	
December 15, 1947	Under Colorado Skies	

=== 1948 ===
Release date	Title	Notes
January 1, 1948	The Main Street Kid	
January 10, 1948	The Gay Ranchero	
January 15, 1948	Slippy McGee	
February 1, 1948	Campus Honeymoon	
February 22, 1948	Oklahoma Badlands	
February 23, 1948	Madonna of the Desert	
March 14, 1948	The Inside Story	
March 25, 1948	Lightnin' in the Forest	
March 28, 1948	Bill and Coo	
April 1, 1948	California Firebrand	
April 15, 1948	The Bold Frontiersman	
April 25, 1948	Old Los Angeles	
April 25, 1948	Heart of Virginia	
April 26, 1948	King of the Gamblers	
April 30, 1948	Under California Stars	
May 13, 1948	Carson City Raiders	
May 24, 1948	The Gallant Legion	
May 25, 1948	I, Jane Doe	
May 31, 1948	Secret Service Investigator	
June 15, 1948	The Timber Trail	
June 28, 1948	Train to Alcatraz	
July 15, 1948	Eyes of Texas	
July 15, 1948	Marshal of Amarillo	
July 26, 1948	Daredevils of the Clouds	
September 1, 1948	Sons of Adventure	
September 3, 1948	Angel in Exile	
September 5, 1948	Night Time in Nevada	
September 11, 1948	Out of the Storm	
September 15, 1948	Desperadoes of Dodge City	
September 15, 1948	Son of God's Country	
October 1, 1948	The Denver Kid	
October 1, 1948	Moonrise	
October 7, 1948	Macbeth	
October 31, 1948	The Plunderers	
November 1, 1948	Angel on the Amazon	
November 5, 1948	Grand Canyon Trail	
November 5, 1948	Sundown in Santa Fe	
November 24, 1948	Renegades of Sonora	
December 8, 1948	Homicide for Three	
December 29, 1948	The Far Frontier	

=== 1949 ===
Release date	Title	Notes
January 5, 1949	Rose of the Yukon	
January 22, 1949	Sheriff of Wichita	
February 8, 1949	Daughter of the Jungle	
February 25, 1949	The Last Bandit	
March 1, 1949	Wake of the Red Witch	
March 8, 1949	Hideout	
March 15, 1949	Duke of Chicago	
March 28, 1949	The Red Pony	
March 29, 1949	Death Valley Gunfighter	
April 8, 1949	Prince of the Plains	
April 15, 1949	Streets of San Francisco	
April 29, 1949	Susanna Pass	
May 2, 1949	Frontier Investigator	
May 23, 1949	Law of the Golden West	
May 29, 1949	Hellfire	
June 8, 1949	Outcasts of the Trail	
July 15, 1949	The Wyoming Bandit	
July 27, 1949	South of Rio	
July 28, 1949	Flaming Fury	
August 1, 1949	The Red Menace	
August 15, 1949	Brimstone	
August 29, 1949	Bandit King of Texas	
September 1, 1949	Post Office Investigator	
September 5, 1949	The Kid from Cleveland	
September 9, 1949	Down Dakota Way	
September 15, 1949	The Fighting Kentuckian	
September 22, 1949	Flame of Youth	
October 7, 1949	San Antone Ambush	
October 15, 1949	Navajo Trail Raiders	
October 15, 1949	Alias the Champ	
November 4, 1949	Ranger of Cherokee Strip	
November 15, 1949	The Golden Stallion	
November 24, 1949	Pioneer Marshal	
November 25, 1949	Powder River Rustlers	
December 14, 1949	Sands of Iwo Jima	
December 22, 1949	The Blonde Bandit	

== 1950s ==
=== 1950 ===
Release date	Title	Notes
January 8, 1950	Bells of Coronado	
January 30, 1950	Unmasked	
February 6, 1950	Gunmen of Abilene	
February 28, 1950	Tarnished	
February 28, 1950	Singing Guns	
March 1, 1950	Belle of Old Mexico	
March 12, 1950	Federal Agent at Large	
March 25, 1950	House by the River	distribution only; produced by Fidelity Pictures Corporation
March 25, 1950	Code of the Silver Sage	
March 26, 1950	Harbor of Missing Men	
March 31, 1950	The Vanishing Westerner	
April 1, 1950	The Arizona Cowboy	
May 1, 1950	Women from Headquarters	
May 1, 1950	Salt Lake Raiders	
May 10, 1950	The Invisible Monster	
May 18, 1950	Rock Island Trail	
May 22, 1950	The Savage Horde	
June 1, 1950	Hills of Oklahoma	
June 1, 1950	Destination Big House	
June 1, 1950	Twilight in the Sierras	
June 26, 1950	The Avengers	
June 30, 1950	Covered Wagon Raid	
June 30, 1950	Trigger, Jr.	
July 8, 1950	Trial Without Jury	
July 20, 1950	The Old Frontier	
July 28, 1950	Jungle Stampede	
August 6, 1950	Vigilante Hideout	
August 15, 1950	The Showdown	
August 29, 1950	Lonely Heart Bandits	
September 6, 1950	Frisco Tornado	
September 15, 1950	Surrender	
September 18, 1950	Redwood Forest Trail	
September 18, 1950	Prisoners in Petticoats	
September 25, 1950	Sunset in the West	
October 15, 1950	Hit Parade of 1951	
October 23, 1950	Rustlers on Horseback	
November 15, 1950	North of the Great Divide	
November 15, 1950	Rio Grande	
November 20, 1950	Under Mexicali Stars	
November 25, 1950	The Missourians	
December 15, 1950	Trail of Robin Hood	
December 15, 1950	California Passage	

=== 1951 ===
Release date	Title	Notes
January 20, 1951	Pride of Maryland	
January 27, 1951	Belle Le Grand	
January 30, 1951	Rough Riders of Durango	
February 2, 1951	Spoilers of the Plains	
February 23, 1951	Missing Women	
February 28, 1951	Night Riders of Montana	
March 1, 1951	Silver City Bonanza	
March 3, 1951	Oh! Susanna	
March 5, 1951	Cuban Fireball	
March 23, 1951	Insurance Investigator	
March 30, 1951	Heart of the Rockies	
April 8, 1951	Thunder in God's Country	
April 26, 1951	Bullfighter and the Lady	
May 1, 1951	Buckaroo Sheriff of Texas	
May 15, 1951	In Old Amarillo	
May 15, 1951	Wells Fargo Gunmaster	
May 30, 1951	Million Dollar Pursuit	
June 1, 1951	Fighting Coast Guard	
June 20, 1951	Secrets of Monte Carlo	
July 1, 1951	The Dakota Kid	
July 15, 1951	Rodeo King and the Senorita	
July 25, 1951	Lost Planet Airmen	feature version of their 1949 film serial King of the Rocket Men
August 24, 1951	Fort Dodge Stampede	
September 15, 1951	Havana Rose	
September 15, 1951	Arizona Manhunt	
October 6, 1951	Adventures of Captain Fabian	
October 15, 1951	South of Caliente	
October 15, 1951	Utah Wagon Train	
October 20, 1951	Honeychile	
November 6, 1951	The Sea Hornet	
November 15, 1951	Pals of the Golden West	
November 15, 1951	Street Bandits	
November 19, 1951	Desert of Lost Men	
December 5, 1951	The Wild Blue Yonder	

=== 1952 ===
Release date	Title	Notes
January 21, 1952	Captive of Billy the Kid	
January 26, 1952	Lady Possessed	
February 8, 1952	Colorado Sundown	
March 1, 1952	The Last Musketeer	
March 22, 1952	Leadville Gunslinger	
March 24, 1952	Oklahoma Annie	
April 1, 1952	The Fabulous Senorita	
April 15, 1952	Border Saddlemates	
April 15, 1952	Hoodlum Empire	
April 15, 1952	Wild Horse Ambush	
May 1, 1952	Gobs and Gals	
May 20, 1952	Black Hills Ambush	
June 1, 1952	Bal Tabarin	
June 15, 1952	I Dream of Jeanie	
June 20, 1952	Thundering Caravans	
July 25, 1952	Old Oklahoma Plains	
September 5, 1952	Woman of the North Country	
September 14, 1952	The Quiet Man	Inducted into the National Film Registry in 2013
October 1, 1952	Tropical Heat Wave	
October 8, 1952	Desperadoes' Outpost	
October 10, 1952	The WAC from Walla Walla	
October 10, 1952	Toughest Man in Arizona	
October 20, 1952	South Pacific Trail	
November 15, 1952	Woman in the Dark	
November 20, 1952	Thunderbirds	
November 25, 1952	Ride the Man Down	

=== 1953 ===
Release date	Title	Notes
February 1, 1953	Marshal of Cedar Rock	
February 15, 1953	San Antone	
February 25, 1953	Old Overland Trail	
March 20, 1953	Woman They Almost Lynched	
March 30, 1953	The Lady Wants Mink	
April 5, 1953	A Perilous Journey	
April 28, 1953	Fair Wind to Java	
May 2, 1953	The Sun Shines Bright	
May 8, 1953	Iron Mountain Trail	
May 15, 1953	Savage Frontier	
June 12, 1953	City That Never Sleeps	
July 15, 1953	Sweethearts on Parade	
August 5, 1953	Down Laredo Way	
August 8, 1953	Bandits of the West	
August 15, 1953	Champ for a Day	
September 8, 1953	El Paso Stampede	
September 22, 1953	Trent's Last Case	
September 28, 1953	Shadows of Tombstone	
October 21, 1953	Sea of Lost Ships	
November 15, 1953	Flight Nurse	
November 15, 1953	Crazylegs	
December 16, 1953	Geraldine	
December 15, 1953	Red River Shore	

=== 1954 ===
Release date	Title	Notes
January 15, 1954	Jubilee Trail	
February 10, 1954	Phantom Stallion	
March 25, 1954	Make Haste to Live	
April 1, 1954	Untamed Heiress	
June 1, 1954	Hell's Half Acre	
July 1, 1954	Laughing Anne	
August 15, 1954	The Outcast	
August 23, 1954	Johnny Guitar	Inducted into the National Film Registry in 2008
August 25, 1954	Roogie's Bump	
September 1, 1954	The Shanghai Story	
September 1, 1954	Tobor the Great	
December 3, 1954	Trouble in the Glen	
December 8, 1954	The Atomic Kid	
December 15, 1954	Hell's Outpost	

=== 1955 ===
Release date	Title	Notes
January 5, 1955	African Manhunt	
January 12, 1955	Trouble in Store	distribution only
January 28, 1955	Carolina Cannonball	
February 2, 1955	Doctor in the House	distribution only
February 18, 1955	Timberjack	
March 22, 1955	Yellowneck	distribution only
May 5, 1955	The Eternal Sea	
May 12, 1955	Santa Fe Passage	
May 19, 1955	I Cover the Underworld	
June 2, 1955	City of Shadows	
June 15, 1955	The Road to Denver	distribution only
June 23, 1955	Double Jeopardy	
July 7, 1955	Lay That Rifle Down	
August 3, 1955	The Last Command	
August 11, 1955	The Divided Heart	distribution only. Made in Britain.
September 15, 1955	Headline Hunters	
September 29, 1955	Cross Channel	distribution only
October 13, 1955	The Twinkle in God's Eye	
October 27, 1955	No Man's Woman	
October 28, 1955	A Man Alone	
November 10, 1955	Secret Venture	distribution only
November 17, 1955	The Vanishing American	
December 15, 1955	The Fighting Chance	

=== 1956 ===
Release date	Title	Notes
January 6, 1956	Flame of the Islands	
January 20, 1956	Jaguar	
January 27, 1956	Track the Man Down	
January 30, 1956	Hidden Guns	
March 9, 1956	Come Next Spring	
March 15, 1956	When Gangland Strikes	
March 29, 1956	Magic Fire	
April 4, 1956	The Maverick Queen	First film in Naturama
April 6, 1956	Stranger at My Door	
April 27, 1956	Terror at Midnight	
July 23, 1956	Dakota Incident	
August 4, 1956	Thunder Over Arizona	
August 17, 1956	Lisbon	
August 24, 1956	A Strange Adventure	
October 5, 1956	Daniel Boone, Trail Blazer	distribution only
October 12, 1956	Scandal Incorporated	
October 19, 1956	The Man Is Armed	
October 26, 1956	Above Us the Waves	distribution only
November 16, 1956	A Woman's Devotion	
December 21, 1956	Accused of Murder	

=== 1957 ===
Release date	Title	Notes
January 25, 1957	Duel at Apache Wells	
February 15, 1957	Affair in Reno	
March 8, 1957	Hell's Crossroads	
April 5, 1957	Spoilers of the Forest	Final film shot in Trucolor
May 31, 1957	The Lawless Eighties	
June 21, 1957	Journey to Freedom	
June 28, 1957	The Unearthly	distribution only
June 28, 1957	Beginning of the End	distribution only
July 15, 1957	The Last Stagecoach West	
September 7, 1957	Pawnee	
September 15, 1957	Taming Sutton's Gal	
September 22, 1957	The Wayward Girl	
October 6, 1957	Hell Canyon Outlaws	
October 18, 1957	Panama Sal	
November 1, 1957	Raiders of Old California	
November 11, 1957	The Crooked Circle	
November 15, 1957	Eighteen and Anxious	
November 25, 1957	Man from Tangier	
December 6, 1957	Hell Ship Mutiny	
December 13, 1957	Gunfire at Indian Gap	
December 25, 1957	West of Suez	

=== 1958 ===
Release date	Title	Notes
January 4, 1958	Satan's Satellites	Feature film version of the serial Zombies of the Stratosphere
January 7, 1958	Missile Monsters	Feature film version of the serial Flying Disc Man from Mars
January 10, 1958	Outcasts of the City	
February 7, 1958	Scotland Yard Dragnet	distribution only
February 28, 1958	The Notorious Mr. Monks	
March 21, 1958	Morning Call	
April 24, 1958	Juvenile Jungle	
April 24, 1958	Young and Wild	
May 30, 1958	Man or Gun	
June 1, 1958	Girl in the Woods	
June 6, 1958	The Man Who Died Twice	
June 11, 1958	Street of Darkness	
October 3, 1958	No Place to Land	
December 2, 1958	Invisible Avenger	

=== 1959 ===
Release date	Title	Notes
January 23, 1959	Plunderers of Painted Flats	Final film in Naturama
February 13, 1959	OSS 117 Is Not Dead	distribution only
February 25, 1959	Hidden Homicide	distribution only

== 1980s ==
Release date	Title	Notes
January 17, 1988	Stranger on My Land	Sold directly to television and was selected as an ABC Movie of the Week
June 10, 1988	Candy Mountain	
August 1988	Starlight Hotel	
September 9, 1988	Night of the Demons	

== 1990s ==
Release date	Title	Notes
February 3, 1991	Sarah, Plain and Tall	
February 3, 1991	Son of the Morning Star	
February 15, 1991	Cadence	distributed by New Line Cinema
February 18, 1991	Love, Lies and Murder	
April 7, 1991	Separate but Equal	
April 25, 1991	Time to Kill	
July 26, 1991	Trust	distributed by Fine Line Features
August 30, 1991	Beastmaster 2: Through the Portal of Time	distributed by New Line Cinema
October 18, 1991	The Devil's Daughter	
October 23, 1991	Adventures in Dinosaur City	
February 9, 1992	The Lost World	
May 2, 1992	A Woman, Her Men, and Her Futon	
July 17, 1992	Dark Horse	
February 7, 1993	Skylark	
February 10, 1993	Shadowhunter	
February 17, 1993	The Swordsman	
February 28, 1993	Lake Consequence	
June 4, 1993	The Goodbye Bird	
June 4, 1993	A Heart in Winter	
September 3, 1993	Boxing Helena	International distribution only; produced by Main Line Pictures
October 8, 1993	Ruby in Paradise	
May 13, 1994	Night of the Demons 2	
June 4, 1994	Sodbusters	
September 16, 1994	Boca	
November 16, 1994	The Paperboy	
April 4, 1995	Bigfoot: The Unforgettable Encounter	
May 27, 1995	The Tin Soldier	
1995	Two-Bits & Pepper	
September 5, 1995	Digital Man	
September 24, 1995	The Courtyard	
October 3, 1995	Relative Fear	
October 17, 1995	The Babysitter	Direct-to-video
November 4, 1995	Rent-a-Kid	
November 7, 1995	Malicious	Distribution only; produced by Keystone Entertainment
November 24, 1995	Rumpelstiltskin	
December 8, 1995	Live Nude Girls	
January 2, 1996	Amanda and the Alien	
January 16, 1996	Night of the Scarecrow	Direct-to-video
January 26, 1996	Once Upon a Time... When We Were Colored	
May 3, 1996	Open Season	
May 5, 1996	A Season in Purgatory	
May 7, 1996	Brothers' Destiny	
June 4, 1996	Storybook	
August 23, 1996	Freeway	Distribution only; produced by The Kushner-Locke Company
September 6, 1996	Killer: A Journal of Murder	
October 4, 1996	Bound	
October 25, 1996	Thinner	Distribution by Paramount Pictures
February 18, 1997	Amityville Dollhouse	
May 30, 1997	Family Plan	
June 17, 1997	Little Bigfoot	
August 17, 1997	Legend of the Spirit Dog	
October 7, 1997	Night of the Demons 3	
October 17, 1997	Kiss & Tell	
March 24, 1998	Little Bigfoot 2: The Journey Home	
February 26, 1999	Eight Days a Week	
October 19, 1999	Freeway II: Confessions of a Trickbaby	

== 2020s ==
All titles listed here have been acquired and co-distributed by Paramount Global Content Distribution unless mentioned otherwise.

Release date	Title	Notes
August 10, 2023	BlackBerry	international distribution outside Latin America, the Middle East, Scandinavia, the Baltics, the CIS, Spain and airlines only; produced by Elevation Pictures, XYZ Films, Telefilm Canada, CBC Films, Ontario Creates, IPR.VC, the Canada Media Fund, Rhombus Media and Zapruder Films; distributed by Elevation Pictures in Canada
September 15, 2023	Lift	distribution only; produced by Vulcan Productions, Beaufort 9 Productions, JustFilms - Ford Foundation, Catapult Film Fund and 25 Stories
October 6, 2023	The Caine Mutiny Court-Martial	distribution only
October 6, 2023	Vindicta	distribution only; produced by SP Media Group
December 7, 2023	El Titán: The Adrián González Story	distribution only; produced by Bluecode Entertainment and Fishbowl Worldwide Media; released in the U.S. on Prime Video
December 8, 2023	The End We Start From	North American distribution only; produced by SunnyMarch, Hera Pictures, Anton Corp, BBC Film, BFI and C2 Motion Picture Group
January 1, 2024	The New Americans: Gaming a Revolution	distribution only; produced by RatPac Documentary Films, Interloper Films and Third Eye Motion Picture Company; co-distributed in the U.S. and Canada by Netflix
January 3, 2024	Self Reliance	studio credit only; produced by MRC, Clown Show, Lonely Island Classics and Walcott Productions; co-distributed by Hulu, Paramount Global Content Distribution and Neon
January 5, 2024	The Painter	distribution only; produced by SP Media Group
January 29, 2024	The Greatest Night in Pop	produced by MRC, Dorothy Street Pictures and Makemake Entertainment; co-distributed by Netflix
February 9, 2024	Air Force One Down	distribution only; produced by SP Media Group
March 15, 2024	French Girl	distribution outside Canada only; produced by Caramel Films and aBard Production; distributed by Elevation Pictures in Canada
March 15, 2024	Snack Shack	distribution only; produced by MRC, T-Street Productions and Paperclip Ltd
May 10, 2024	The Image of You	distribution only; produced by Motion Picture Corporation of America and Brad Krevoy Productions
May 10, 2024	Poolman	distribution in Canada, Germany, Austria, Switzerland, Italy, the Benelux, Turkey and Asian pay television only; produced by AGC Studios, Shiny Penny Productions, Wicious Pictures and Barry Linen Motion Pictures
May 31, 2024	The Young Wife	distribution only; produced by FilmNation Entertainment and Archer Gray
June 25, 2024	Hard Home	distribution only; produced by SP Media Group
June 28, 2024	Reunion	co-distribution with Lionsgate; produced by Spyglass Media Group, Unique Features and Artists Road
August 16, 2024	Rob Peace	financier, sales agent and worldwide home media and North American distributor; co-production with Los Angeles Media Fund, Hill District Media, Participant, Sugar Peace Productions and 25 Stories
August 16, 2024	Art of Eight Limbs	distribution only; produced by Tiger Style Media
August 16, 2024	The Lockdown	distribution only; produced by Tiger Style Media
August 23, 2024	Lady Scorpions	distribution only; produced by Tiger Style Media
August 23, 2024	Kung Fu Games	distribution only; produced by Tiger Style Media
September 6, 2024	Mother Mother	worldwide sales agent; produced by Secret Hideout, Potboiler Productions and 25 Stories; co-distributed internationally by Goodfellas
September 17, 2024	Strangers	distribution only; produced by SP Media Group
September 27, 2024	Disco's Revenge	distribution outside Canada only; produced by Elevation Pictures and 86 Media House
October 1, 2024	Cassino in Ischia	distribution only; produced by Isola Verde Productions and De Fina Film Productions
October 11, 2024	The Silent Hour	North American and Asian pay television distribution only; produced by AGC Studios and Meridian Pictures
December 10, 2024	Utopia	distribution only; produced by SP Media Group
December 13, 2024	September 5	co-distribution with Paramount Pictures outside Germany, Austria and Switzerland only; produced by Constantin Film, Edgar Reitz Filmproduktion, BerghausWöbke Filmproduktion and Projected Picture Works
January 14, 2025	Man with No Past	distribution only; produced by SP Media Group
January 24, 2025	Bau: Artist at War	distribution only; produced by Brookwell McNamara Entertainment, Busy Bee and Iron Image Media; co-distributed theatrically in the U.S. and Canada by ShowBiz Direct
February 14, 2025	Heart Eyes	international distribution outside Scandinavia, Poland, Hungary, Romania, Bulgaria, the Czech Republic, Slovakia and Israel only; produced by Spyglass Media Group and Divide/Conquer
February 21, 2025	Millers in Marriage	distribution only; produced by Marlboro Road Gang Productions
March 18, 2025	High Ground	distribution only; produced by SP Media Group
April 25, 2025	Winter Spring Summer or Fall	distribution only; produced by Motion Picture Corporation of America and Wall Fly
June 20, 2025	Alma and the Wolf	distribution only; produced by TPC
July 17, 2025	Friendship	international distribution only; produced by Fifth Season and BoulderLight Pictures
August 22, 2025	Trust	distribution only; produced by Twisted Pictures, Koulest Production and Luber Rouklin Entertainment
September 5, 2025	The Cut	North American distribution only; produced by Tea Shop Productions and Amazing Owl
September 5, 2025	Twinless	co-production with TPC and Permut Presentations; distribution rights licensed to Lionsgate and Roadside Attractions in North America and Stage 6 Films internationally
September 19, 2025	Adulthood	North American distribution only; produced by Many Rivers Production, Trouper Productions, Olive Hill Media and Fresh Fish Films
September 26, 2025	All of You	co-production with MRC and Ryder Picture Company; distributed by Apple TV+
September 26, 2025	All the Devils Are Here	distribution only; produced by MRC and T-Street Productions
October 3, 2025	Shell	U.S. distribution only; produced by Dark Castle Entertainment, Range Media Partners, Blank Tape and Love & Squalor Pictures
January 27, 2026	Untitled Home Invasion Romance	distribution only; produced by Motion Picture Corporation of America
February 6, 2026	Twisted	distribution only; produced by Envision Media Arts and Twisted Pictures
February 20, 2026	One Mile	distribution only; produced by Kapital Entertainment and Nomadic Pictures
February 26, 2026	The Gray House	limited series; co-production with Territory Pictures, Revelations Entertainment and Big Dreams Entertainment: released by Amazon Prime Video in the U.S
March 17, 2026	Preschool	distribution only; produced by Dakotakid Productions and the Long Game
April 14, 2026	The Highest Stakes	distribution only; produced by SP Media Group
June 5, 2026	Savage House	distribution outside Australia and New Zealand only; produced by Altitude Film Entertainment, Calculus Media, Valmont Productions, Deluge Pictures, Moon7 Films and Record Player Films
June 19, 2026	Finnegan's Foursome	distribution only; produced by Marlboro Road Gang Productions
September 11, 2026	Mighty Mary	distribution only; produced by Skydance Sports, 50 Eggs Films, Southern Breeze Entertainment and the Arthur M. Blank Family Foundation
September 18, 2026	Bad Apples	distribution only; produced by Pulse Films
October 6, 2026	Karl	distribution only
October 13, 2026	Let's Have Kids!	distribution only; produced by MRC and a Dare to Be Great Situation
October 16, 2026	DreamQuil	North American distribution only; produced by HanWay Films, Patriot Pictures, Brownstone Productions, Big Valley Pictures and Landay Entertainment
November 17, 2026	Long Haired Businessmen	distribution only; produced by Funny or Die
April 23, 2027	A Place in Hell	international distribution only; co-production with Neon, MRC and T-Street Productions

=== Undated films ===
Release date	Title	Notes
2026	The Hollywood Rabbi	distribution only; produced by Motion Picture Corporation of America
2026	Orphans	U.S. distribution only; produced by Dark Castle Entertainment, Eagle Vision and Gnosis Moving Pictures

== See also ==
- List of film serials by studio#Republic Pictures
