= Sam Flint =

American actor (1882–1980)

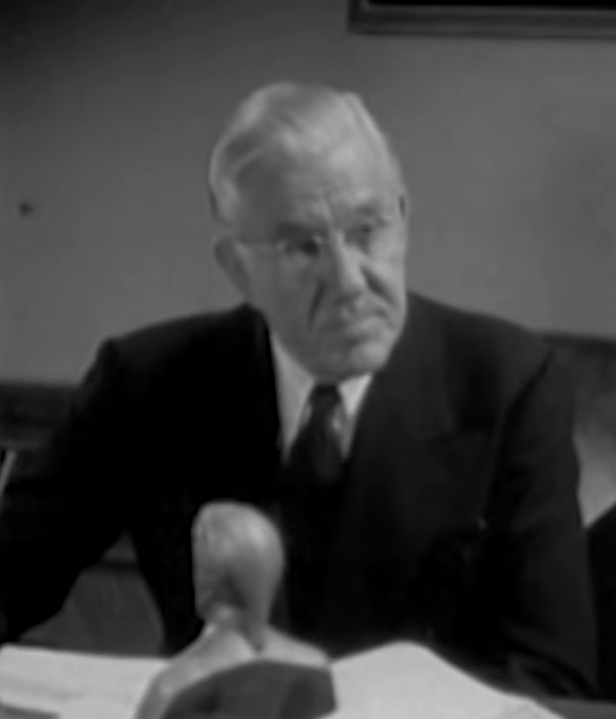
- Flint in The Monster Maker (1944)
- Born: Samuel A. Ethridge; October 19, 1882; Gwinnett County, Georgia, U.S.
- Died: October 17, 1980 (aged 97); Woodland Hills, Los Angeles, California, U.S.
- Occupation: Actor
- Years active: 1933–1968
- Spouse(s): Ella Ethridge (m. 19??)

Sam Flint (born Samuel A. Ethridge; October 19, 1882 – October 17, 1980) was an American actor. He appeared in more than 200 films, and is perhaps most familiar to today's audiences from Charlie Chan mysteries, adventure serials (notably The Phantom as the Phantom's father), It's a Wonderful Life (as the relieved bank manager mopping his brow in Mr. Potter's office), and the Three Stooges short Micro-Phonies (as singer Christine McIntyre's wealthy father).

Flint was born in Gwinnett County, Georgia. As a young man, he became interested in the theater and appeared in many dramatic plays.

By 1933, he was a member of the Los Angeles company appearing in the hit play The Drunkard, under his real name of Sam Ethridge, and broke into movies with the small, independent Monogram Pictures. Comedian W. C. Fields wanted to include The Drunkard in one of his films, and arranged for Paramount Pictures to sign members of the company—including Ethridge—to movie contracts. While most of the actors returned to the live theater, Ethridge continued to work in pictures. Under the screen name Sam Flint, he became familiar for his weathered face, distinguished mustache, and dignified bearing, typecasting him profitably as authority figures: doctors, lawyers, judges, ship's captains, military officers, bankers, racetrack stewards, and senior officials. His last film was the satirical feature Head (1968), starring The Monkees.

== Personal life ==
Flint was married to actress Ella Ethridge, whom he met after she watched him in a play in Galveston, Texas. Later they had an agreement: "Neither will accept a part with any company unless the contract includes the other."

== Selected filmography ==
- Sensation Hunters (1933) - Ship's Captain
- Devil's Mate (1933) - Prison Doctor (uncredited)
- Broken Dreams (1933) - Dr. Greenwood (uncredited)
- Ace of Aces (1933) - Army Doctor (uncredited)
- Mr. Skitch (1933) - General Matthews (uncredited)
- One Is Guilty (1934) - Coroner (uncredited)
- The Murder in the Museum (1934) - Councilman Blair Newgate
- Such Women Are Dangerous (1934) - Doane, Doorman (uncredited)
- Money Means Nothing (1934) - Police Sergeant (uncredited)
- The Old Fashioned Way (1934) - Mary Wilson's father (credited as Samuel Ethridge)
- I Give My Love (1934) - Business Man (uncredited)
- The Girl from Missouri (1934) - Senator #2 (uncredited)
- Chained (1934) - Gun Repair Clerk (uncredited)
- Death on the Diamond (1934) - Baseball Commissioner (uncredited)
- Belle of the Nineties (1934) - Fire Chief (uncredited)
- Wake Up and Dream (1934) - Theatre Patron (uncredited)
- Student Tour (1934) - Captain (uncredited)
- Tomorrow's Youth (1934) - Jim Lawton - Mrs. Hall's Attorney
- Mrs. Wiggs of the Cabbage Patch (1934) - Railroad Agent Jenkins (uncredited)
- Evelyn Prentice (1934) - Dr. Lyons (uncredited)
- I'll Fix It (1934) - Minor Role (uncredited)
- Broadway Bill (1934) - Racetrack Official
- Fugitive Lady (1934) - Conductor (uncredited)
- The Best Man Wins (1935) - Doctor (uncredited)
- Helldorado (1935) - Hale (uncredited)
- The County Chairman (1935) - (uncredited)
- Wings in the Dark (1935) - Rockwell (uncredited)
- The Winning Ticket (1935) - Captain (uncredited)
- The Mystery Man (1935) - Jerome Roberts, Publisher
- The Whole Town's Talking (1935) - City Commissioner (uncredited)
- Car 99 (1935) - Bank President (scenes deleted)
- In Spite of Danger (1935) - Sanders (uncredited)
- It Happened in New York (1935) - Ship's Officer (uncredited)
- I'll Love You Always (1935) - First Business Man (uncredited)
- Reckless (1935) - Jo Mercer's Father (uncredited)
- Mister Dynamite (1935) - Mr. Hollaner (uncredited)
- Vagabond Lady (1935) - Ship's Captain (uncredited)
- The Awakening of Jim Burke (1935) - Lawyer (uncredited)
- People Will Talk (1935) - Mr. Quimby (uncredited)
- Chinatown Squad (1935) - Ship's Captain (uncredited)
- Pursuit (1935) - Dr. Byers, a Veterinarian (uncredited)
- The Crusades (1935) - Captain of Hospitalers (uncredited)
- Atlantic Adventure (1935) - Colonel Barnett (uncredited)
- Anna Karenina (1935) - Husband - Second Couple (uncredited)
- Diamond Jim (1935) - Man at Bar (uncredited)
- Metropolitan (1935) - Bank Director (uncredited)
- The New Frontier (1935) - Milt Dawson
- Grand Exit (1935) - Mr. French (uncredited)
- Lawless Range (1935) - Sam Middleton (uncredited)
- Another Face (1935) - Police Sergeant (uncredited)
- A Tale of Two Cities (1935) - Aristocrat (uncredited)
- My Marriage (1936) - Simpson (uncredited)
- A Face in the Fog (1936) - Harrison - Newspaper Editor
- The Lawless Nineties (1936) - Justice Department Official
- Red River Valley (1936) - George Baxter
- Big Brown Eyes (1936) - Martin (uncredited)
- Florida Special (1936) - Doctor (uncredited)
- Champagne Charlie (1936) - Board Member (uncredited)
- The Lonely Trail (1936) - Governor of Texas
- The Crime of Dr. Forbes (1936) - Faculty Doctor (uncredited)
- Winds of the Wasteland (1936) - Dr. William Forsythe
- Public Enemy's Wife (1936) - Doctor (uncredited)
- Charlie Chan at the Race Track (1936) - Ship's Captain (uncredited)
- Wives Never Know (1936) - Doctor (uncredited)
- Two Minutes to Play (1936) - Martin Granville Sr.
- Along Came Love (1936) - Dinner Party Guest (uncredited)
- The Accusing Finger (1936) - District Attorney Benton
- Red Lights Ahead (1936) - Franklin Q. Whitney
- The Devil Diamond (1937) - Board Member (uncredited)
- Man of the People (1937) - Hearing Leader (uncredited)
- Blake of Scotland Yard (1937) - Chief Insp. Henderson
- Breezing Home (1937) - Steward (uncredited)
- Sea Devils (1937) - Yacht Captain (uncredited)
- Dick Tracy (1937, Serial) - Meeting Chairman (uncredited)
- Midnight Court (1937) - Judge (uncredited)
- Her Husband Lies (1937) - Crapshooter (uncredited)
- 23 1/2 Hours' Leave (1937) - Chief of Police (uncredited)
- Racketeers in Exile (1937) - Finance Man (uncredited)
- Jim Hanvey, Detective (1937) - Bit (uncredited)
- I Promise to Pay (1937) - Police Sergeant (uncredited)
- You Can't Buy Luck (1937) - Judge (uncredited)
- Criminals of the Air (1937) - Chafin (uncredited)
- It Could Happen to You (1937) - President of Faculty (uncredited)
- Topper (1937) - Board Member (uncredited)
- Saratoga (1937) - Racetrack Judge (uncredited)
- Windjammer (1937) - Marvin T. Bishop
- Sea Racketeers (1937) - Sam Collins (uncredited)
- Roaring Six Guns (1937) - George Ringold
- Smashing the Vice Trust (1937) - Martin Standish, Lawyer
- Merrily We Live (1938) - Mr. Fleming (uncredited)
- State Police (1938) - Deputy Joe Palmer
- Over the Wall (1938) - Judge (uncredited)
- The Last Stand (1938) - Calhourn
- Female Fugitive (1938) - Edward J. Howard
- The Fighting Devil Dogs (1938, Serial) - Colonel Grayson [Chs. 1–2, 7]
- Delinquent Parents (1938) - Hospital Doctor (uncredited)
- Crime Takes a Holiday (1938) - Governor's Advisor (uncredited)
- Forgotten Girls (1940) - Judge (uncredited)
- Saturday's Children (1940) - City Hospital Doctor (uncredited)
- I Take This Oath (1940) - Uncle Jim Kelly
- The Way of All Flesh (1940) - First Director (uncredited)
- Double Date (1941) - Doctor
- The Singing Hill (1941) - Rancher (uncredited)
- Under Fiesta Stars (1941) - Fry
- Flying Blind (1941) - Army Officer (uncredited)
- Tuxedo Junction (1941) - Judge Lewis
- Marry the Boss's Daughter (1941) - Vice-President (uncredited)
- Road to Happiness (1941) - Col. Gregory
- South of Santa Fe (1942) - Harold Prentiss
- Reap the Wild Wind (1942) - Surgeon (uncredited)
- Shepherd of the Ozarks (1942) - Mr. Clark (uncredited)
- Spy Smasher (1942, Serial) - Adm. Corby
- Hello, Annapolis (1942) - Adm. Jones (uncredited)
- The Old Homestead (1942) - Politician (uncredited)
- Wildcat (1942) - Banker Giles (uncredited)
- American Empire (1942) - Doctor (uncredited)
- The Traitor Within (1942) - Businessman (uncredited)
- Mountain Rhythm (1943) - Pierce
- Thundering Trails (1943) - Judge Morgan
- Dead Men Walk (1943) - Minister
- My Son, the Hero (1943) - Sam Duncan (uncredited)
- Chatterbox (1943) - Production Assistant (uncredited)
- Swing Your Partner (1943) - Teal
- Dixie (1943) - Southern Colonel (uncredited)
- The Stranger from Pecos (1943) - Ward - Banker
- Batman (1943, Serial) - Dr. G.H. Borden [Ch. 1] (uncredited)
- The Masked Marvel (1943, Serial) - Police Sergeant (uncredited)
- The Kansan (1943, Serial) - Walter McIntire (uncredited)
- Outlaws of Stampede Pass (1943) - Jeff Lewis - Blacksmith
- False Colors (1943) - Judge Stevens (uncredited)
- The Crime Doctor's Strangest Case (1943) - Addison Burns (uncredited)
- The Phantom (1943, Serial) - Phantom's Father (uncredited)
- Casanova in Burlesque (1944) - Audience Member (uncredited)
- Lady in the Death House (1944) - Gov. Harrison
- Cover Girl (1944) - Coudair's Butler (uncredited)
- The Monster Maker (1944) - Dr. Adams
- The Lady and the Monster (1944) - G. Phipps - Bank Manager (uncredited)
- Gambler's Choice (1944) - Family Court Judge (uncredited)
- The Story of Dr. Wassell (1944) - Dr. Holmes' Board Member (uncredited)
- The Contender (1944) - Maj. Palmer
- The Chinese Cat (1944) - Thomas P. Manning
- Boss of Boomtown (1944) - Blaine Cornwall
- Stars on Parade (1944) - Executive (uncredited)
- Take It Big (1944) - Rodeo Official (uncredited)
- Man from Frisco (1944) - Chief of Police (uncredited)
- Goodnight, Sweetheart (1944) - Mort (uncredited)
- Mr. Winkle Goes to War (1944) - Army Doctor at Induction Center (uncredited)
- Silver City Kid (1944) - Business Man
- Allergic to Love (1944) - Dick (uncredited)
- Wilson (1944) - Orator (uncredited)
- Marriage Is a Private Affair (1944) - Bit Role (uncredited)
- Goin' to Town (1944) - Dr. Crane
- Lights of Old Santa Fe (1944) - Sheriff
- The Missing Juror (1944) - Judge (uncredited)
- The Thin Man Goes Home (1944) - Hotel Clerk (uncredited)
- Song of the Range (1944) - John Winters
- Together Again (1944) - Minor Role (uncredited)
- She Gets Her Man (1945) - Dignified Man (uncredited)
- A Guy, a Gal and a Pal (1945) - Judge (uncredited)
- I'll Remember April (1945) - Board Member (uncredited)
- Crime, Inc. (1945) - Judge Poole (uncredited)
- Circumstantial Evidence (1945) - Prison Board Member (uncredited)
- Swing Out, Sister (1945) - Mr. Bradstreet
- I'll Tell the World (1945) - Stockholder (uncredited)
- Nob Hill (1945) - Politician (uncredited)
- The Man from Oklahoma (1945) - Mayor Witherspoon
- Incendiary Blonde (1945) - Patron at Nick's (uncredited)
- Ziegfeld Follies (1945) - Majordomo's Assistant ('This Heart of Mine') (uncredited)
- Along the Navajo Trail (1945) - Breck Alastair
- Song of the Prairie (1945) - 2nd Sheriff (uncredited)
- Shadow of Terror (1945) - Sheriff Dixon
- Johnny Angel (1945) - Barnes - Theatre Manager (uncredited)
- The Windjammer (1945) - Arkansas Banker
- Captain Tugboat Annie (1945) - Fire Chief
- Who's Guilty? (1945) - Horace Black
- Gilda (1946) - American Cartel Member (uncredited)
- Lost City of the Jungle (1946, Serial) - Chairman of the Peace Foundation (uncredited)
- Junior Prom (1946) - Mr. Forrest
- Somewhere in the Night (1946) - Bank Guard
- Night and Day (1946) - Professor (uncredited)
- My Pal Trigger (1946) - Sheriff
- Big Town (1946) - Newsman (uncredited)
- Singing on the Trail (1946) - Terrence Mallory
- The Crimson Ghost (1946, Serial) - Maxwell
- Nocturne (1946) - Mr. Barnes—Movie Theater Manager (uncredited)
- Criminal Court (1946) - Insp. Carson - 18th Precinct (uncredited)
- Sioux City Sue (1946) - Doctor (uncredited)
- Magnificent Doll (1946) - Waters (uncredited)
- Lone Star Moonlight (1946) - Jim Mahoney
- The Locket (1946) - District Attorney (uncredited)
- It's a Wonderful Life (1946) - Relieved Banker in Potter's Office (uncredited)
- California (1947) - Higgins (uncredited)
- Hit Parade of 1947 (1947) - Janitor (uncredited)
- Lost Honeymoon (1947) - Colonel Lawlor (uncredited)
- A Likely Story (1947) - Doctor (uncredited)
- Prairie Raiders (1947) - Meeker - Secretary of Interior (uncredited)
- Swing the Western Way (1947) - Senator Darrow
- Sport of Kings (1947) - Chief Steward (uncredited)
- Heaven Only Knows (1947) - Heavenly Deity (uncredited)
- The Wild Frontier (1947) - Steve Lawson - Insurance Agent
- The Black Widow(1947, Serial) - Prof. Henry Weston
- Cass Timberlane (1947) - Charles Sayward (uncredited)
- Albuquerque (1948) - Doctor (uncredited)
- Phantom Valley (1948) - Jim Durant (uncredited)
- Caged Fury (1948) - Doctor Branson (uncredited)
- Mr. Reckless (1948) - Oil Field Guard (uncredited)
- Old Los Angeles (1948) - Martin (uncredited)
- The Strawberry Roan (1948) - Doctor (uncredited)
- Four Faces West (1948) - Storekeeper
- A Southern Yankee (1948) - Confederate Officer (uncredited)
- The Golden Eye (1948) - Dr. Groves (uncredited)
- Isn't It Romantic? (1948) - Townsman (uncredited)
- Adventures of Frank and Jesse James (1948, Serial) - Paul Thatcher - Banker
- Smoky Mountain Melody (1948) - Brandon
- Command Decision (1948) - Congressman (uncredited)
- Knock on Any Door (1949) - Prison Warden (uncredited)
- The Green Promise (1949) - Dr. Pomeroy (uncredited)
- Home in San Antone (1949) - Dan Wallace
- The Gay Amigo (1949) - Ed Paulsen
- Ringside (1949) - Doctor
- Brimstone (1949) - Dr. Cane (uncredited)
- Alias the Champ (1949) - Ring Doctor (uncredited)
- The Baron of Arizona (1950) - Board Member - Department of Interior (uncredited)
- The Palomino (1950) - Veterinarian (uncredited)
- Rock Island Trail (1950) - Army Officer (uncredited)
- Timber Fury (1950) - Henry Wilson
- Bright Leaf (1950) - Johnson (uncredited)
- Snow Dog (1950) - Sam, Twin Rivers Factor (uncredited)
- County Fair (1950) - Racetrack Steward (uncredited)
- The Admiral Was a Lady (1950) - Yacht Captain (uncredited)
- The Return of Jesse James (1950) - Jeweller (uncredited)
- The Fireball (1950) - Dr. Barton
- Cherokee Uprising (1950) - Judge Harrison
- Blues Busters (1950) - Doctor (uncredited)
- Kansas Raiders (1950) - Bank President (uncredited)
- The Blazing Sun (1950) - Banker (uncredited)
- Outlaws of Texas (1950) - Banker (uncredited)
- Frenchie (1950) - Rancher (uncredited)
- Sierra Passage (1950) - Jim (uncredited)
- Belle Le Grand (1951) - Broker (uncredited)
- Fort Savage Raiders (1951) - Col. Markham
- Man from Sonora (1951) - Fred Allison (uncredited)
- Francis Goes to the Races (1951) - Board Member (uncredited)
- Snake River Desperadoes (1951) - Jason Fox (uncredited)
- Father Takes the Air (1951) - Chief of Police (uncredited)
- Strangers on a Train (1951) - Train Passenger Requesting Light (uncredited)
- Stagecoach Driver (1951) - Bill Prescott (uncredited)
- A Millionaire for Christy (1951) - Mayor Flint (uncredited)
- Saturday's Hero (1951) - Alum (uncredited)
- Leave It to the Marines (1951) - Col. Flenge
- Sky High (1951) - Col. Baker
- Northwest Territory (1951) - Pop Kellogg
- The Hawk of Wild River (1952) - Sheriff Clark Mahoney (uncredited)
- Road Agent (1952) - George Drew
- Carbine Williams (1952) - Board Member (uncredited)
- Young Man with Ideas (1952) - Mr. Jones (uncredited)
- Red Planet Mars (1952) - Worried Man at Lincoln Memorial (uncredited)
- Sound Off (1952) - Army Doctor (uncredited)
- Francis Goes to West Point (1952) - Major Olsen (uncredited)
- Sea Tiger (1952) - Jim Klavier
- Yukon Gold (1952) - Boat Captain
- The Lusty Men (1952) - Doctor (uncredited)
- The Steel Trap (1952) - Bank Teller #6 (uncredited)
- Ruby Gentry (1952) - Neil Fallgren
- Count the Hours (1953) - Judge #2 (uncredited)
- Cow Country (1953) - Maitland
- Law and Order (1953) - Mayor Hurley (uncredited)
- The Vanquished (1953) - Connors (uncredited)
- Devil's Canyon (1953) - Marshall Hayes (uncredited)
- The Moonlighter (1953) - Mr. Mott - Bank President
- Walking My Baby Back Home (1953) - Critic (uncredited)
- Loophole (1954) - Sam - Bank Guard (uncredited)
- Racing Blood (1954) - Doc Nelson
- The Outlaw's Daughter (1954) - Doctor (uncredited)
- Unchained (1955) - Parole Board (uncredited)
- Abbott and Costello Meet the Keystone Kops (1955) - Railroad Conductor (uncredited)
- The Big Tip Off (1955) - Father Kearney
- Night Freight (1955) - Gordon
- The Brass Legend (1956) - Old Apache Bend Townsman
- The Night Runner (1957) - Elderly man
- Shoot-Out at Medicine Bend (1957) - Brother Nathaniel (uncredited)
- Snowfire (1957) - Molly's Doctor (uncredited)
- God Is My Partner (1957) - Jury Foreman (uncredited)
- My Man Godfrey (1957) - Mr. Pepper (uncredited)
- Gunman's Walk (1958) - Townsman (uncredited)
- The FBI Story (1959) - Doctor (uncredited)
- I'll Give My Life (1960) - Roy Calhoun
- Psycho (1960) - County Sheriff (uncredited)
- Snow White and the Three Stooges (1961) - Chamberlain (uncredited)
- Critic's Choice (1963) - Little League Rooter (uncredited)
- Sunday in New York (1963) - Second Train Conductor (uncredited)
- Soldier in the Rain (1963) - Old Man
- The New Phil Silvers Show (1964, Episode: "Keep Cool") - Charlie
- Gunsmoke (1965, Episode: "Death Watch") - Jake
- Once a Thief (1965) - Security Guard (uncredited)
- The Swinger (1966) - Elderly Man (uncredited)
- Head (1968) - Old Man (uncredited) (final film role)
