= Mountain Rhythm =

Mountain Rhythm may refer to:

- Mountain Rhythm (1939 film), an American Western film
- Mountain Rhythm (1943 film), an American comedy film
