= Swing Your Lady =

1938 film by Ray Enright

- Theatrical release poster
- Directed by: Ray Enright
- Screenplay by: Joseph Schrank; Maurice Leo
- Based on: Swing Your Lady; 1936 play by Kenyon Nicholson; Charles Robinson
- Produced by: Samuel Bischoff
- Starring: Humphrey Bogart; Frank McHugh; Louise Fazenda; Nat Pendleton; Penny Singleton; Allen Jenkins; Ronald Reagan
- Cinematography: Arthur Edeson
- Edited by: Jack Killifer
- Music by: Adolph Deutsch
- Production company: Warner Bros. Pictures
- Release date: January 8, 1938
- Running time: 77 minutes
- Country: United States
- Language: English

Swing Your Lady is a 1938 American country musical comedy film starring an ensemble cast of Humphrey Bogart, Frank McHugh, Louise Fazenda, Nat Pendleton, Penny Singleton, and Alan Jenkins, with the Weaver Brothers and Elviry in support. The Warner Bros. production was directed by Ray Enright

== Plot ==
Promoter Ed Hatch arrives in the Ozarks with his slow-witted wrestler Joe Skopapoulos, whom he pits in a highly promoted bout to be held against a hillbilly Amazon blacksmith, Sadie Horn. Joe falls in love with Sadie and won't fight her, or, drunk in romantic rapture, anyone – at least not until Sadie's beau, Noah, shows up. Love triumphs, despite Ed's machinations, and after defeating Noah, Joe passes on a bout at Madison Square Garden to marry Sadie and take over the blacksmith's shop. Noah rides off with Ed and his crew.

== Cast ==
Actor/Actress	Role
Humphrey Bogart	Ed Hatch
Frank McHugh	Popeye Bronson
Louise Fazenda	Sadie Horn
Nat Pendleton	Joe Skopapolous
Penny Singleton	Cookie Shannon
Allen Jenkins	Shiner Ward
Leon Weaver	Waldo Davis
Frank Weaver	Ollie Davis
June Weaver	Mrs. Davis (as Elviry Weaver)
Ronald Reagan	Jack Miller
Daniel Boone Savage	Noah Webster
Hugh O'Connell	Smith
Tommy Bupp	Rufe Horn
Sonny Bupp	Len Horn (as Sunny Bupp)
Joan Howard	Mattie Horn
Sue Moore	Mabel
Olin Howland	Hotel Proprietor
Sammy White	Specialty Dancer

== Production ==
Swing Your Lady features former American Olympic silver medalist and ex-professional wrestler Nat Pendleton. In the movie's climactic bout he is pitted against Daniel Boone Savage, a professional wrestler making his film debut.

The picture also features the debut film performance of the Weaver Brothers and Elviry, a comedy troupe better known as The Arkansas Travelers during their many years in vaudeville and on the Grand Ole Opry radio show (and not to be confused with Bob Burns' Arkansas Traveler). Following this performance, the trio was picked up by Republic Pictures for Down in Arkansas, the first in what was to be a series of 11 comedy films for the studio.

Penny Singleton, then still a natural brunette, would turn blonde in 1938 and play the comic strip character Blondie in a series of 28 films and a popular radio show.

Humphrey Bogart was apparently becoming very disenchanted his film roles at Warner Bros. at this stage of his career; the following year he appeared in his only horror/sci-fi film, The Return of Doctor X, and these were two roles he never liked talking about when he became a major film star several years later; he considered his performance in Swing Your Lady the worst of his career.

Ronald Reagan makes a cameo as a news reporter in one of his early roles.

== Legacy ==
Swing Your Lady is listed in the 1978 book The Fifty Worst Films of All Time.
