= Leonard Carey =

English actor (1887–1977)

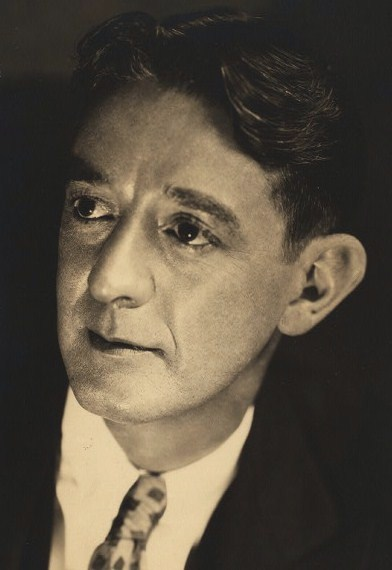
- Carey, c. 1925
- Born: 23 February 1887; London, England, UK
- Died: 11 September 1977 (aged 90); Woodland Hills, Los Angeles, California, U.S.
- Resting place: Chapel Of The Pines Crematory
- Years active: 1937–1957

Leonard Carey (25 February 1887 – 11 September 1977) was an English character actor who very often played butlers in Hollywood films of the 1930s, 1940s and 1950s. He was also active in television during the 1950s. He is perhaps best known for his role as the beach hermit, Ben, in Alfred Hitchcock's Rebecca (1940).

== Career ==
One of his biggest roles was as "Dusty" in the film, Moon Over Her Shoulder (1941) with John Sutton. Other memorable appearances included roles in The Awful Truth (1937), Heaven Can Wait (1943), Hitchcock's Strangers on a Train (1951), Snows of Kilimanjaro (1952) and Thunder in the East (1953).

Carey retired from acting in the late 1950s. He died at aged 90 in Los Angeles. His interment was at Chapel of the Pines Crematory.

== Selected filmography ==
- Laughter (1930) - Benham, Gibson's Butler
- Honor Among Lovers (1931) - Forbes, Butler
- Once a Lady (1931) - Butler (uncredited)
- Her Majesty, Love (1931) - Waiter (uncredited)
- Nice Women (1931) - Connors, Butler
- Working Girls (1931) - Boyd's Butler (uncredited)
- Dr. Jekyll and Mr. Hyde (1931) - Briggs - Lanyon's Butler (uncredited)
- This Reckless Age (1932) - Braithwaite (uncredited)
- Shanghai Express (1932) - Carey (uncredited)
- Merrily We Go to Hell (1932) - Prentice's Butler (uncredited)
- Week Ends Only (1932) - Wilson, the Butler (uncredited)
- Two Against the World (1932) - Club Waiter (uncredited)
- The Crash (1932) - Fair's Butler (uncredited)
- Call Her Savage (1932) - Jackson - Randall's Butler (uncredited)
- A Lady's Profession (1933) - Albert - Garfield's Butler (uncredited)
- King of the Jungle (1933) - Clerk at Hunting License Bureau (uncredited)
- Infernal Machine (1933) - Hans (uncredited)
- The Little Giant (1933) - Ingleby - the Cass' Butler (uncredited)
- Looking Forward (1933) - Employee Talking to Miss Judd (uncredited)
- Ann Carver's Profession (1933) - Melville - Butler (uncredited)
- The Avenger (1933) - Talbot
- Bombshell (1933) - Winters
- The Worst Woman in Paris? (1933) - Chumley - the Butler
- Gambling Lady (1934) - Butler at Gambling Club (uncredited)
- Double Door (1934) - William
- Smarty (1934) - Tilford - Tony's Butler
- The Loudspeaker (1934) - Finds Janet's address for Joe (uncredited)
- His Greatest Gamble (1934) - Alfred
- The Age of Innocence (1934) - The Butler
- Outcast Lady (1934) - Martin - Passerby (uncredited)
- I Sell Anything (1934) - Pertwee - Millicent's Chauffeur
- The Little Minister (1934) - Hendry Munn
- Hold 'Em Yale (1935) - Langdonn
- Our Little Girl (1935) - Jackson
- Ginger (1935) - Gwynne (uncredited)
- Curly Top (1935) - Morgan's Secretary (uncredited)
- Here's to Romance (1935) - Buttler (uncredited)
- Two for Tonight (1935) - Mr. Myers' Butler (uncredited)
- Ladies Love Danger (1935) - James, the Butler
- The Bishop Misbehaves (1935) - Office Man (uncredited)
- Metropolitan (1935) - Boris - Ghita's Butler (uncredited)
- The Man Who Broke the Bank at Monte Carlo (1935) - Head Waiter (uncredited)
- Strike Me Pink (1936) - Maitre d' at Club Lido (uncredited)
- Rose Marie (1936) - Louis (uncredited)
- The Milky Way (1936) - Mrs. Winthrop's Butler (uncredited)
- Wife vs. Secretary (1936) - Taggart (uncredited)
- The Unguarded Hour (1936) - Hilton - Alan's Assistant (uncredited)
- Small Town Girl (1936) - Concierge (uncredited)
- Trouble for Two (1936) - Valet (uncredited)
- Little Miss Nobody (1936) - Butler (uncredited)
- Bunker Bean (1936) - Kent's Butler
- The Luckiest Girl in the World (1936) - Butler
- 15 Maiden Lane (1936) - Thomas Lockhart's Butler (uncredited)
- A Woman Rebels (1936) - Lord Gaythorne's Butler (uncredited)
- The Last of Mrs. Cheyney (1937) - Ames
- Night of Mystery (1937) - Lister
- The Emperor's Candlesticks (1937) - Valet to Wolensky (uncredited)
- The Singing Marine (1937) - Darcy - Phinney's Valet (uncredited)
- My Dear Miss Aldrich (1937) - William - Butler (uncredited)
- Angel (1937) - Barker's Footman (uncredited)
- Beg, Borrow or Steal (1937) - James, Lord Braemer's Butler (uncredited)
- Hollywood Hotel (1937) - Dupre's Butler (uncredited)
- Hitting a New High (1937) - Jervons, Blynn's Butler
- Here's Flash Casey (1938) - Garden Party Waiter (uncredited)
- Sally, Irene and Mary (1938) - Zorka's Butler (uncredited)
- Hold That Kiss (1938) - Gibley - Piermont's Butler (uncredited)
- Blond Cheat (1938) - Meggs - the Trent Butler (uncredited)
- Bulldog Drummond in Africa (1938) - Phillips (uncredited)
- The Little Adventuress (1938) - Butler (uncredited)
- The Lone Wolf Spy Hunt (1939) - Jameson
- Beauty for the Asking (1939) - Peters (uncredited)
- Fast and Loose (1939) - Craddock
- The Hound of the Baskervilles (1939) - Hugo's Servant (uncredited)
- The Zero Hour (1939) - Butler
- Stronger Than Desire (1939) - Albert - Flagg's Butler (uncredited)
- Five Little Peppers and How They Grew (1939) - Martin
- Raffles (1939) - Bingham's Secretary (uncredited)
- Parole Fixer (1940) - Craden's Butler (uncredited)
- Rebecca (1940) - Ben
- In Old Missouri (1940) - Haskins
- Private Affairs (1940) - Casper, the Butler
- Sing, Dance, Plenty Hot (1940) - Henderson
- Hired Wife (1940) - Peterson - Butler (uncredited)
- Sky Murder (1940) - Sutter - Grand's Butler (uncredited)
- A Dispatch from Reuters (1940) - Delane's Secretary (uncredited)
- Nice Girl? (1941) - Upton - Calvert's Butler (uncredited)
- Rage in Heaven (1941) - Eric - Chauffeur (uncredited)
- That Hamilton Woman (1941) - Orderly (uncredited)
- West Point Widow (1941) - Simpson (uncredited)
- Accent on Love (1941) - Flowers
- Mountain Moonlight (1941) - Briggs
- Private Nurse (1941) - Smitty
- We Go Fast (1941) - Hempstead's Butler (uncredited)
- Moon Over Her Shoulder (1941) - Mate Dusty Rhodes
- Suspicion (1941) - Burton - McLaidlaws' Butler (uncredited)
- Confirm or Deny (1941) - Sidney
- Tuxedo Junction (1941) - Jenkins
- Son of Fury: The Story of Benjamin Blake (1942) - Pale Tom (uncredited)
- What's Cookin'? (1942) - Butler (uncredited)
- Yokel Boy (1942) - Monroe the Butler (uncredited)
- This Above All (1942) - Policeman with Rector (uncredited)
- Mrs. Miniver (1942) - Chandler - Lady Beldon's Butler (uncredited)
- The Affairs of Martha (1942) - The Butler (uncredited)
- I Married an Angel (1942) - Servant (uncredited)
- Give Out, Sisters (1942) - Jamison - The Waverly Butler
- Nightmare (1942) - Parker - Stafford's Servant (uncredited)
- The Youngest Profession (1943) - Walter Pidgeon's Valet (uncredited)
- Heaven Can Wait (1943) - Flogdell - Van Cleve's First Butler (uncredited)
- Gaslight (1944) - Guide (uncredited)
- Once Upon a Time (1944) - English Bobby (uncredited)
- The Invisible Man's Revenge (1944) - The Police Constable (uncredited)
- Secrets of Scotland Yard (1944) - Butler (uncredited)
- Babes on Swing Street (1944) - William (uncredited)
- Sweet and Low-Down (1944) - The Wilsons' Butler (uncredited)
- National Velvet (1944) - Pressman (uncredited)
- Ministry of Fear (1944) - Porter (uncredited)
- Penthouse Rhythm (1945) - The Butler (uncredited)
- Tomorrow Is Forever (1946) - Hamilton Employee (uncredited)
- Moss Rose (1947) - Coroner (uncredited)
- Unconquered (1947) - Jeremiah Dixon - London Astronomer
- This Time for Keeps (1947) - Butler (uncredited)
- The Exile (1947) - Cavalier (uncredited)
- Forever Amber (1947) - Dead Caller (uncredited)
- The Paradine Case (1947) - Courtroom Stenographer (uncredited)
- If Winter Comes (1947) - Official with Summons (uncredited)
- Slightly French (1949) - Wilson (uncredited)
- Adventure in Baltimore (1949) - Vestryman (uncredited)
- The Secret Garden (1949) - Charles, the Butler (uncredited)
- Challenge to Lassie (1949) - Patron of Dining Room (uncredited)
- That Forsyte Woman (1949) - Jones - Old Jolyon's Butler (uncredited)
- Please Believe Me (1950) - Ship's Captain (uncredited)
- Kind Lady (1951) - Postman
- Strangers on a Train (1951) - Anthonys' Butler (uncredited)
- Dick Turpin's Ride (1951) - Jailer (uncredited)
- Thunder in the East (1951) - Dr. Paling
- Washington Story (1952) - Chef (uncredited)
- Les Misérables (1952) - Citizen (uncredited)
- The Snows of Kilimanjaro (1952) - Dr. Simmons (uncredited)
- The King's Thief (1955) - Servant (uncredited)
- While the City Sleeps (1956) - Steven - Walter's Butler (uncredited)
