= The Weaver Brothers and Elviry =

The Weaver Brothers and Elviry were musical comedy vaudeville and film performers, in the "hillbilly" style. The group consisted of brothers Leon "Abner" Weaver and Frank "Cicero" Weaver, with June "Elviry" Weaver. The group headlined a traveling vaudeville show with Abner as the master of ceremonies, presenting songs, comedy, dancing, acrobatic acts and barnyard imitations.

The act was built around the three performers' comedic personalities. Abner was a loquacious, genial hillbilly who was sharper than he first appears. Cicero was a bashful clown, who only speaks through whistles. Elviry was sharp-tongued and belligerent, with a deadpan comic style.

The group also made a series of films for Republic Pictures in the late 1930s and early 40s. Their first film appearance was in the 1938 Warner Bros. movie Swing Your Lady, starring Humphrey Bogart. They were picked up by Republic, which produced films targeted at rural audiences who were already fans of the Weavers' vaudeville act. Their first Republic picture, 1938's Down in 'Arkansaw', had the Weavers second-billed after Ralph Byrd; with their second film, the 1939 Jeepers Creepers, they received top billing. After the box office success of Jeepers Creepers, Republic signed a contract with the Weavers for three movies a year for the next two years. The series lasted for eleven films, ending in 1943 with Mountain Rhythm.

== History ==
Leon Weaver began performing in 1902, and then brought his brother Frank into the act. June joined the group in 1913, and married Leon in 1916. June divorced Leon around 1924, and she then married Frank in 1928. June's daughter recalled, "Mother married brothers and they all got along and worked in harmony. Mother still bossed [ex-hubby] Leon around, and he loved it. He would say, 'Now, Ellie.' They were longtime friends and remained so."

They became headliners after World War I, and performed with top vaudeville performers like Al Jolson, George Burns and Gracie Allen, Jack Benny and Beatrice Lillie. Elviry's comic catchphrase was, "If I had my druthers, I druther..."

All three were versatile musicians. Leon was adept at mandolin, guitar, fiddle and handsaw, while Frank played novelty instruments including a spinning banjo and a one-man band. June could play piano, mandolin and ukulele.

== Films ==
- Swing Your Lady (1938)
- Down in 'Arkansaw' (1938)
- Jeepers Creepers (1939)
- In Old Missouri (1940)
- Grand Ole Opry (1940)
- Friendly Neighbors (1940)
- Arkansas Judge (1941)
- Mountain Moonlight (1941)
- Tuxedo Junction (1941)
- Shepherd of the Ozarks (1942)
- The Old Homestead (1942)
- Mountain Rhythm (1943)
