= Thurston Hall =

American actor (1882–1958)

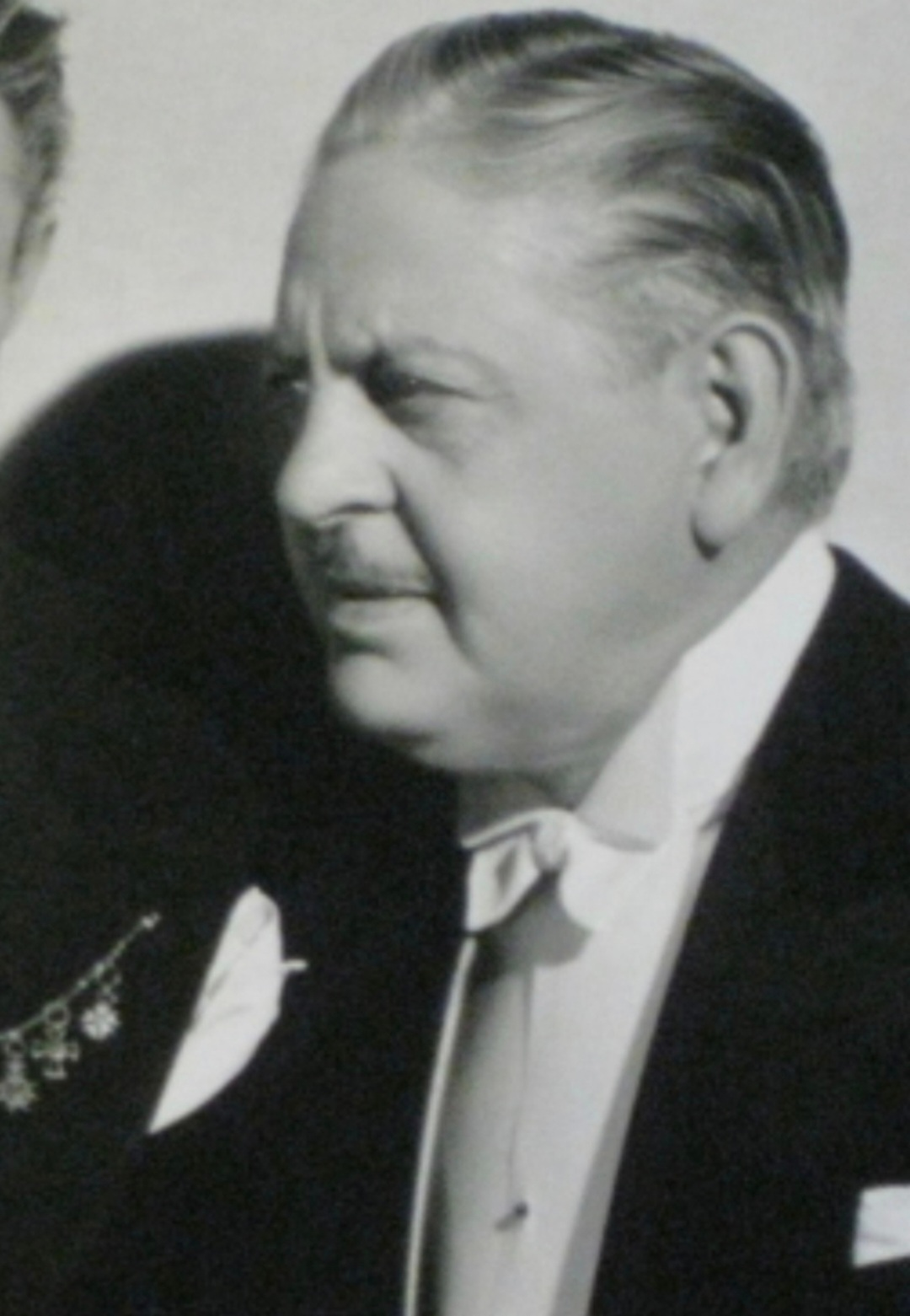
- Hall in We Have Our Moments (1937)
- Born: Ernest Thurston Hall; May 10, 1882; Boston, Massachusetts, U.S.
- Died: February 20, 1958 (aged 75); Beverly Hills, California, U.S.
- Occupation: Actor
- Years active: 1915–1957
- Spouse(s): Quenda Hackett (m. 19??; his death 1958)

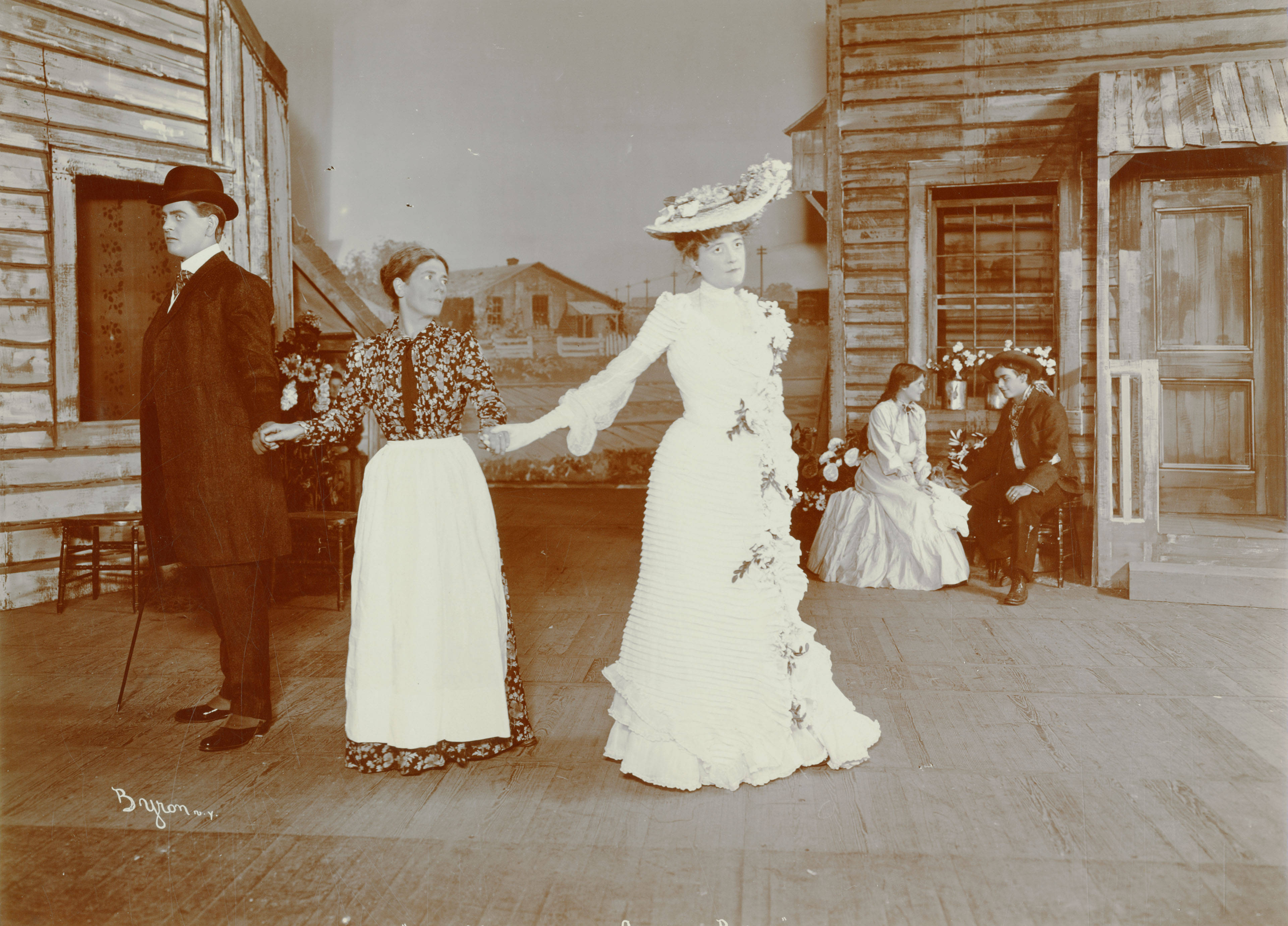
Hall in the initial Broadway production of Mrs. Wiggs of the Cabbage Patch, 1904.

Ernest Thurston Hall (May 10, 1882 – February 20, 1958) was an American film, stage and television actor.

== Career ==
=== Stage ===
Hall toured with various New England stage companies during his teens, then went on to London, where he formed a small stage troupe. He also toured New Zealand and South Africa."

At 22 in 1904, Hall was in the first stage production of Mrs. Wiggs of the Cabbage Patch. His Broadway credits include The Only Girl (1914), Have a Heart (1917), Civilian Clothes (1919), The French Doll (1922), Still Waters (1926), Buy, Buy, Baby (1926), Mixed Doubles (1927), Behold the Bridegroom (1927), The Common Sin (1928), Sign of the Leopard (1928), Security (1929), Fifty Million Frenchmen (1929), Everything's Jake (1930), Philip Goes Forth (1931), Chrysalis (1932), Thoroughbred (1933), Re-echo (1934), They Shall Not Die (1934), Spring Freshet (1934), All Rights Reserved (1934), and Rain from Heaven (1934).

In 1925, Hall took a troupe to Australia to perform the play So This Is London.

=== Film and television ===
Hall's film career began with his work in silent films in 1915. He appeared in 250 films between 1915 and 1957 and is remembered for his portrayal, during the later stages of his career, of often pompous or blustering authority figures. Early in his silent career, he supported Theda Bara in her vamp-costume dramas.

Hall's best-known television role was as Mr. Schuyler, the boss of Cosmo Topper (played by Leo G. Carroll), in the 1950s television series, Topper (1953–1956).

== Personal life ==
Hall was married to Quenda Hackett at the time of his death.

== Filmography ==
- The Mirror (1915, Short) - The Rival
- Cleopatra (1917) - Antony
- The Price Mark (1917) - Dr. Daniel Melfi
- Love Letters (1917) - John Harland
- Flare-Up Sal (1918) - The Red Rider
- An Alien Enemy (1918) - David J. Hale
- Tyrant Fear (1918) - Harley Dane
- The Mating of Marcella (1918) - Robert Underwood
- The Kaiser's Shadow (1918) - Hugo Wagner
- We Can't Have Everything (1918) - Peter Cheever
- The Brazen Beauty (1918) - Kenneth Hyde
- The Squaw Man (1918) - Henry, Jim's Cousin
- The Midnight Patrol (1918) - Officer Terrence Shannon
- Who Will Marry Me? (1919) - Jerome Van Tyne
- The Exquisite Thief (1919) - Algernon P. Smythe
- The Unpainted Woman (1919) - Martin O'Neill
- The Weaker Vessel (1919) - J. Booth Hunter
- The Spitfire of Seville (1919) - Kent Staunton
- Empty Arms (1920) - Bruce Gordon
- The Valley of Doubt (1920) - Jules
- Mother Eternal (1921) - Edward Stevens Sr
- Idle Hands (1921) - Henry Livingston
- The Iron Trail (1921) - Curtis Gordon
- Fair Lady (1922) - Italian banker
- Wildness of Youth (1922) - Edward Grayton
- The Royal Oak (1923) - Colonel Ancketell
- The Great Well (1924) - Peter Starling
- Hooray for Love (1935) - Commodore Jason Thatcher
- Love Me Forever (1935) - Maurizio
- The Black Room (1935) - Col. Paul Hassel
- After the Dance (1935) - District Attorney
- Atlantic Adventure (1935) - City Editor Rutherford (uncredited)
- The Public Menace (1935) - Captain of Ocean Liner
- The Girl Friend (1935) - George S. Harmon
- She Couldn't Take It (1935) - Party Guest (uncredited)
- Metropolitan (1935) - T. Simon Hunter
- The Case of the Missing Man (1935) - Boyle
- A Feather in Her Hat (1935) - Sir Elroyd Joyce
- Guard That Girl (1935) - Dr. Silas Hudson
- Crime and Punishment (1935) - Editor
- One Way Ticket (1935) - Mr. Ritchie
- Super Speed (1935) - Investor
- Too Tough to Kill (1935) - Jim Whitney
- The Lone Wolf Returns (1935) - Inspector Crane
- Don't Gamble with Love (1936) - Martin Gage
- Pride of the Marines (1936) - Col. Gage
- Devil's Squadron (1936) - Major Metcalf
- Roaming Lady (1936) - E. J. Reid
- The King Steps Out (1936) - Major
- The Three Wise Guys (1936) - Hatcher
- Trapped by Television (1936) - John Curtis
- Shakedown (1936) - T. Gregory Stuart
- Two-Fisted Gentleman (1936) - Pop
- The Man Who Lived Twice (1936) - Dr. Clifford L. Schuyler
- Killer at Large (1936) - Inspector O'Hara
- Theodora Goes Wild (1936) - Arthur Stevenson
- Lady from Nowhere (1936) - James Gordon Barnes
- Don't Tell the Wife (1937) - Maj. Manning
- Women of Glamour (1937) - Mr. Stark
- Parole Racket (1937) - Jameson
- We Have Our Moments (1937) - Frank Rutherford
- Oh, Doctor (1937) - 'Doc' Erasmus Thurston
- I Promise to Pay (1937) - Police Captain Hall
- Venus Makes Trouble (1937) - Harlan Darrow
- It Can't Last Forever (1937) - Fulton
- Counsel for Crime (1937) - Sen. Maddox
- Murder in Greenwich Village (1937) - Charles Cabot
- Paid to Dance (1937) - State Governor
- All American Sweetheart (1937) - R.O. Davis (uncredited)
- Little Miss Roughneck (1938) - Joe Crowley
- Penitentiary (1938) - Judge (uncredited)
- No Time to Marry (1938) - Pettensall
- Women in Prison (1938) - chairman of the Board (uncredited)
- There's Always a Woman (1938) - District Attorney
- Women Are Like That (1938) - Claudius King
- Extortion (1938) - Prof. Tisdelle
- Professor Beware (1938) - Mr. Van Buren
- The Main Event (1938) - Captain Phillips
- Squadron of Honor (1938) - Bob Metcalf
- Fast Company (1938) - Dist. Atty. MacMillen
- The Amazing Dr. Clitterhouse (1938) - Grant
- The Affairs of Annabel (1938) - Major
- Campus Confessions (1938) - Wayne Atterbury Sr.
- Hard to Get (1938) - Atwater
- Spring Madness (1938) - Charles Platt (uncredited)
- Out West with the Hardys (1938) - H.R. Bruxton (uncredited)
- Going Places (1938) - Col. Withering
- You Can't Cheat an Honest Man (1939) - Mr. Bel-Goodie
- Three Smart Girls Grow Up (1939) - Senator (uncredited)
- Dodge City (1939) - Twitchell (uncredited)
- Ex-Champ (1939) - Mr. Courtney
- Million Dollar Legs (1939) - Gregory Melton Sr.
- Each Dawn I Die (1939) - Hanley
- Mutiny on the Blackhawk (1939) - Sam Bailey
- The Star Maker (1939) - Mr. Proctor
- Hawaiian Nights (1939) - T.C. Hartley
- The Day the Bookies Wept (1939) - Colonel March
- Dancing Co-Ed (1939) - H.W. Workman
- Sued for Libel (1939) - David Hastings
- Jeepers Creepers (1939) - M.K. Durant
- First Love (1939) - Anthony Drake
- Our Neighbors – The Carters (1939) - Mr. Guilfoyle
- Money to Burn (1939) - Ellis
- The Blue Bird (1940) - Father Time
- Blondie on a Budget (1940) - Brice
- Virginia City (1940) - Gen. George Meade (uncredited)
- Rancho Grande (1940) - John Dodge (voice, uncredited)
- In Old Missouri (1940) - John Pittman Sr.
- Alias the Deacon (1940) - Jim Cunningham
- The Lone Wolf Meets a Lady (1940) - Inspector M.L. Crane
- Millionaires in Prison (1940) - Harold Kellogg
- The Great McGinty (1940) - Mr. Maxwell
- The Golden Fleecing (1940) - Charles Engel
- City for Conquest (1940) - Max Leonard
- Life with Henry (1940) - Mr. Woodring (uncredited)
- Friendly Neighbors (1940) - The Governor
- The Lone Wolf Keeps a Date (1940) - Inspector Crane
- Kiddie Kure (1940, Our Gang short) - Bill 'Old Man' Morton
- The Invisible Woman (1940) - Hudson
- Where Did You Get That Girl? (1941) - Stuyvesant, Four Star Record Co. President
- Four Mothers (1941) - Mr. Davis (uncredited)
- Flight from Destiny (1941) - Dean Somers
- The Lone Wolf Takes a Chance (1941) - Inspector Crane
- Repent at Leisure (1941) - Jay Buckingham
- The Great Lie (1941) - Oscar Worthington James
- Washington Melodrama (1941) - Senator Morton
- She Knew All the Answers (1941) - J.D. Sutton
- In the Navy (1941) - Lead Senator (uncredited)
- Accent on Love (1941) - T.J. Triton
- Hold That Ghost (1941) - Alderman Birch (uncredited)
- Nine Lives Are Not Enough (1941) - H.S.Huntley (uncredited)
- Unexpected Uncle (1941) - Jerry Carter (uncredited)
- Swing It Soldier (1941) - Oscar Simms, Wheezies Sponsor
- Secrets of the Lone Wolf (1941) - Inspector Crane
- Tuxedo Junction (1941) - Doug Gordon
- Remember the Day (1941) - Gov. Teller
- Design for Scandal (1941) - Northcott
- Pacific Blackout (1941) - Williams - Civil Defense Official
- We Were Dancing (1942) - Senator Quimby (uncredited)
- Sleepytime Gal (1942) - Mr. Adams
- The Night Before the Divorce (1942) - Bert 'Mousey' Harriman
- Rings on Her Fingers (1942) - Mr. Harvey Beasley
- Shepherd of the Ozarks (1942) - James Maloney
- Hello, Annapolis (1942) - Capt. Wendall
- The Great Man's Lady (1942) - Mr. Sempler
- Twin Beds (1942) - Horace Touchstone (uncredited)
- Her Cardboard Lover (1942) - Mr. Garthwaite - Barling's Lawyer (uncredited)
- Call of the Canyon (1942) - Grantley B. Johnson
- Counter-Espionage (1942) - Inspector Crane
- The Great Gildersleeve (1942) - Governor John Stafford
- The Hard Way (1943) - Harry - Motion Picture Executive (uncredited)
- One Dangerous Night (1943) - Inspector Crane
- The Youngest Profession (1943) - Mr. Drew
- Sherlock Holmes in Washington (1943) - Senator Henry Babcock
- He Hired the Boss (1943) - Mr. Bates
- Crash Dive (1943) - Senator from Texas (uncredited)
- This Land Is Mine (1943) - Mayor Henry Manville
- Hoosier Holiday (1943) - Henry P. Fairchild
- I Dood It (1943) - Kenneth Lawlor
- Footlight Glamour (1943) - Randolph Wheeler (uncredited)
- Here Comes Elmer (1943) - P. J. Ellis
- Cover Girl (1944) - Tony Pastor (uncredited)
- Follow the Boys (1944) - Man (uncredited)
- The Adventures of Mark Twain (1944) - Politician (uncredited)
- Goodnight, Sweetheart (1944) - Judge James Rutherford
- The Great Moment (1944) - Senator Borland
- Wilson (1944) - Senator Edward H. 'Big Ed' Jones
- Song of Nevada (1944) - John Barrabee
- In Society (1944) - Mr. Van Cleve
- Ever Since Venus (1944) - Edgar Pomeroy
- Something for the Boys (1944) - Colonel Jefferson L. Calhoun (uncredited)
- Bring On the Girls (1945) - Rutledge
- Brewster's Millions (1945) - Colonel Drew
- Thrill of a Romance (1945) - J.P. Bancroft (uncredited)
- Don Juan Quilligan (1945) - First Judge
- Blonde from Brooklyn (1945) - 'Colonel' Hubert Farnsworth
- Lady on a Train (1945) - Josiah Waring
- The Gay Senorita (1945) - J.J. Frentiss
- West of the Pecos (1945) - Colonel Lambeth
- Song of the Prairie (1945) - Jerome Wingate
- Saratoga Trunk (1945) - Mr. Pound (uncredited)
- Colonel Effingham's Raid (1946) - Ed - the Mayor
- Two Sisters from Boston (1946) - Mr. Lawrence Tyburt Patterson Sr.
- Without Reservations (1946) - Baldwin
- One More Tomorrow (1946) - Thomas Rufus Collier II
- She Wrote the Book (1946) - Horace Van Cleve
- Dangerous Business (1946) - B.J. Calhoun
- Three Little Girls in Blue (1946) - Colonel Clay (uncredited)
- The Farmer's Daughter (1947) - Wilbur Johnson
- Welcome Stranger (1947) - Congressman Beeker
- Swing the Western Way (1947) - Jasper Jim Bandy
- The Secret Life of Walter Mitty (1947) - Bruce Pierce
- The Son of Rusty (1947) - Franklyn B. Gibson
- Black Gold (1947) - Colonel Caldwell
- The Unfinished Dance (1947) - Mr. Ronsell
- Mourning Becomes Electra (1947) - Dr. Blake
- It Had to Be You (1947) - Mr. Ned Harrington
- Three Daring Daughters (1948) - Howie Howard, Louise's Assistant (uncredited)
- King of the Gamblers (1948) - 'Pop' Morton
- Up in Central Park (1948) - Governor Motley
- Miraculous Journey (1948) - Kendricks
- Blondie's Secret (1948) - Mr. George Whiteside
- Rusty Saves a Life (1949) - Counsellor Frank A. Gibson
- Manhattan Angel (1949) - Everett H. Burton
- Stagecoach Kid (1949) - Peter Arnold
- The Fountainhead (1949) - Businessman at Party (uncredited)
- Rim of the Canyon (1949) - Big Tim Hanlon
- Square Dance Jubilee (1949) - G.K.
- Bride for Sale (1949) - Mr. Trisby (uncredited)
- Tell It to the Judge (1949) - Sen. Caswell (uncredited)
- Girls' School (1950) - Colonel Selby Matthews
- Belle of Old Mexico (1950) - Horatio Huntington
- Federal Agent at Large (1950) - 'Big Bill' Dixon
- Bright Leaf (1950) - Phillips
- Chain Gang (1950) - John McKelvey
- One Too Many (1950) - Kenneth Simes
- The Bandit Queen (1950) - Governor
- Belle Le Grand (1951) - Parkington
- Whirlwind (1951) - Big Jim Lassiter
- Texas Carnival (1951) - Mr. Gaytes
- One Big Affair (1952) - Mr. 'G'
- Night Stage to Galveston (1952) - Colonel James Bellamy
- Skirts Ahoy! (1952) - Thatcher Kinston
- Carson City (1952) - Charles Crocker
- It Grows on Trees (1952) - John Sleamish—Bank President (uncredited)
- Woman of the North Country (1952) - Mayor Spencer (uncredited)
- The WAC from Walla Walla (1952) - Col. Mayfield
- The Band Wagon (1953) - Colonel Tripp (uncredited)
- Wonder Valley (1953)
- Affair in Reno (1956) - J.B. Del Monte
- The Go-Getter (1956) - Mr. Higgins
