= Daniel Boone Savage =

American professional wrestler

Edward Civil
Personal information
- Born: Edward Civil; 26 February 1899 Ashland, Kentucky, U.S.
- Died: 7 January 1967 (aged 67)

Professional wrestling career
- Ring name(s): Bob Savage; Bull Civil; Daniel Boone; Daniel Boone Savage; Eddie Civil; Kentucky Wildman; Leo Daniel Boone Savage; Whiskers Savage
- Billed height: 6 ft 3 in (1.91 m)
- Billed weight: 250 lb (110 kg)
- Debut: 1933
- Retired: 1963

Edward Civil (26 February 1899 – 7 January 1967), better known as Daniel Boone Savage and "Whiskers" Savage was an American professional wrestler and actor.

== Professional wrestling ==
Boone began wrestling in 1933, notably in Texas. His gimmick was that of a stereotypical country bumpkin with a bushy beard.

On February 7, 1936, Savage was thrown over the top rope by World Heavyweight Champion Danno O'Mahoney in Galveston, who Savage won by disqualification. O'Mahoney was suspended for three months. A rematch happened on May 7, 1936. On May 9, 1936, Savage was acknowledged as the World Heavyweight Titleholder in Texas. Since that time, O'Mahoney had lost his championship to Dick Shikat, but Texas Boxing and Wrestling Commissioner Fred E. Nichols still wanted NWA officials to back Savage as the champion.

During his career he had Best Two Out Of Three Falls matches against Lou Thesz, Buddy Rogers, Bill Longson and Gorgeous George.

Savage's last match was on June 8, 1963, when he lost to Bill Watts in Fort Worth, Texas.

== Acting ==
In 1938, Civil appeared in the musical comedy Swing Your Lady alongside Humphrey Bogart.

== Championships and accomplishments ==
- Southwest Sports, Inc.
  - Texas Heavyweight Championship (1 time)
  - Southern Heavyweight Championship (2 times)
  - World Heavyweight Championship (Texas version) (1 time)
