= Swing the Western Way =

1947 film directed by Derwin Abrahams

- Theatrical release poster
- Directed by: Derwin Abrahams
- Screenplay by: Barry Shipman
- Story by: Bert Horswell
- Produced by: Colbert Clark
- Starring: Jack Leonard; Mary Dugan; Thurston Hall; Regina Wallace; Tris Coffin; Sam Flint
- Cinematography: George F. Kelley
- Edited by: Paul Borofsky
- Production company: Columbia Pictures
- Distributed by: Columbia Pictures
- Release date: June 26, 1947
- Running time: 66 minutes
- Country: United States
- Language: English

Swing the Western Way is a 1947 American Western film directed by Derwin Abrahams and written by Barry Shipman. The film stars Jack Leonard, Mary Dugan, Thurston Hall, Regina Wallace, Tris Coffin and Sam Flint. The film was released on June 26, 1947, by Columbia Pictures.

== Cast ==
- Jack Leonard as Bob Randal
- Mary Dugan as Jean Darrow
- Thurston Hall as Jasper Jim Bandy
- Regina Wallace as Cornelia Kathridge
- Tris Coffin as Martin
- Sam Flint as Senator Darrow
- Ralph Littlefield as Postman
- George Lloyd as Sheriff Morgan
- Eddie Acuff as Mr. Spraggs
- Johnny Bond as Johnny
- Hoosier Hot Shots as Speciality Act
