= Swing Your Partner =

1943 film by Frank McDonald

- Directed by: Frank McDonald
- Screenplay by: Dorrell McGowan; Stuart E. McGowan
- Produced by: Armand Schaefer
- Starring: Myrtle Wiseman; Scotty Wiseman; Barbara Jo Allen; Dale Evans; Ransom M. Sherman; Harry Cheshire
- Cinematography: Bud Thackery
- Edited by: Richard L. Van Enger
- Music by: Mort Glickman
- Production company: Republic Pictures
- Distributed by: Republic Pictures
- Release date: May 20, 1943
- Running time: 72 minutes
- Country: United States
- Language: English

Swing Your Partner is a 1943 American comedy film directed by Frank McDonald and written by Dorrell McGowan and Stuart E. McGowan. The film stars Myrtle Wiseman, Scotty Wiseman, Barbara Jo Allen, Dale Evans, Ransom M. Sherman and Harry Cheshire. The film was released on May 20, 1943, by Republic Pictures.

== Cast ==
- Myrtle Wiseman as Lulubelle
- Scotty Wiseman as Scotty
- Barbara Jo Allen as Vera Vague
- Dale Evans as Dale Evans
- Ransom M. Sherman as Ransom Sherman
- Harry Cheshire as Harry 'Pappy' Cheshire
- Richard Lane as Mr. Lane
- Shug Fisher as Shug
- The Tennessee Ramblers as Tennessee Ramblers Band
- Roger Clark as Johnny Murphy
- Esther Dale as Caroline Bird, aka Anna Robbins
- Judy Clark as Judy
- Charles Judels as Digby
- Rosemary LaPlanche as Secretary
- Sam Flint as Teal
- Forbes Murray as Morningside
- Elmer Jerome as Duffy
- Peppy as Specialty Act
- Peanuts as Specialty Act
