= Grand Ole Opry (film) =

- Theatrical release poster
- Directed by: Frank McDonald
- Screenplay by: Dorrell McGowan; Stuart E. McGowan
- Produced by: Armand Schaefer
- Starring: Leon Weaver; Frank Weaver; June Weaver; Lois Ranson; Allan Lane; Henry Kolker
- Cinematography: Jack A. Marta
- Edited by: Ray Snyder
- Music by: William Lava
- Production company: Republic Pictures
- Distributed by: Republic Pictures
- Release date: June 25, 1940
- Running time: 67 minutes
- Country: United States
- Language: English

Grand Ole Opry is a 1940 American comedy film directed by Frank McDonald and written by Dorrell McGowan and Stuart E. McGowan. The film stars the vaudeville comedy troupe the Weaver Brothers and Elviry, with Lois Ranson, Allan Lane and Henry Kolker. The film was released on June 25, 1940, by Republic Pictures.

The story embraces neither the Grand Ole Opry building nor is it mentioned in the film: the only connection is a number of Grand Ole Opry regulars appearing in the film.

== Plot ==
The film starts with the governor wandering into a duck hunt and getting killed.

The plot then revolves around a campaign to elect a new governor, candidates focussing upon a proposed Farmer's Bill.

The campaign speeches (and songs) are broadcast on the XYZ radio channel.

Candidates are disrupted by singing on a constant basis. Weaver proves the popular choice as he opts for Grand Ole Opry as the music of his campaign.

== Cast ==
- Leon Weaver as Abner Weaver
- Frank Weaver as silent Cicero Weaver the local policeman
- June Weaver as Elviry Weaver
- Lois Ranson as Susie Ann Weaver
- Allan Lane as Fred Barnes
- Henry Kolker as William C. Scully
- John Hartley as 'Hunch' Clifton
- Loretta Weaver as Violey Weaver
- Purnell Pratt as Attorney General
- Claire Carleton as Ginger Gordon
- Ferris Taylor as Lt. Governor Edgar G. Thompson
- Uncle Dave Macon as himself
- Dorris Macon as himself
- Roy Acuff as himself
- Rachel Veach as Acuff Singer
- George D. Hay as himself
