= Tuxedo Junction (film) =

1941 film by Frank McDonald

- Theatrical release poster
- Directed by: Frank McDonald
- Screenplay by: Dorrell McGowan, Stuart E. McGowan
- Story by: Dorrell McGowan, Stuart E. McGowan
- Produced by: Armand Schaefer
- Starring: Leon Weaver, June Weaver, Frank Weaver, Thurston Hall, Frankie Darro, Sally Payne
- Cinematography: Ernest Miller
- Edited by: Charles Craft
- Music by: Mort Glickman
- Production company: Republic Pictures
- Distributed by: Republic Pictures
- Release date: November 25, 1941
- Running time: 70 minutes
- Country: United States
- Language: English

Tuxedo Junction is a 1941 American comedy film directed by Frank McDonald, written by Dorrell McGowan and Stuart E. McGowan, and starring the vaudeville comedy troupe the Weaver Brothers and Elviry, with Thurston Hall, Frankie Darro and Sally Payne. It was released on November 25, 1941, by Republic Pictures.

== Cast ==
- Leon Weaver as Abner Weaver
- June Weaver as Elviry Weaver
- Frank Weaver as Cicero Weaver
- Thurston Hall as Doug Gordon
- Frankie Darro as Jack 'Sock' Anderson
- Sally Payne as Pansy Weaver
- Clayton Moore as Bill Bennett
- Lorna Gray as Joan Gordon
- William "Billy" Benedict as Thomas 'Piecrust' Murphy
- Ken Lundy as Fred 'Soapy' Peters
- Howard Hickman as Judge Leo Rivers
- Leonard Carey as Jenkins
- Betty Blythe as Miss Hornblower
- Sam Flint as Judge Lewis

== Bibliography ==
- Fetrow, Alan G. Feature Films, 1940-1949: a United States Filmography. McFarland, 1994.
