= Arkansas Judge =

1941 film by Frank McDonald

- Theatrical release poster
- Directed by: Frank McDonald
- Written by: Ring Lardner, Jr. Ian McLellan Hunter; Gertrude Purcell; Dorrell McGowan; Stuart McGowan
- Starring: Roy Rogers; Spring Byington; Veda Ann Borg
- Cinematography: Ernest Miller
- Music by: Cy Feuer
- Production company: Republic Pictures
- Distributed by: Republic Pictures
- Release date: January 28, 1941
- Running time: 71 minutes
- Country: United States
- Language: English

Arkansas Judge is a 1941 American Western film directed by Frank McDonald and starring Roy Rogers, Spring Byington, and Veda Ann Borg.

== Plot ==
Tom Martel, a judge's son, returns to town out West after finishing law school. He becomes involved in a personal feud involving a banker's daughter, Hettie Huston, who attempts to railroad poor scrubwoman Mary Shoemaker in the theft of fifty dollars from a local widow.

== Cast ==
- Roy Rogers as Tom Martel
- Veda Ann Borg as Hettie Huston
- Spring Byington as Mary Shoemaker
- Pauline Moore as Margaret Weaver
- Leon Weaver as Judge Abner Weaver
- Frank Weaver as Cicero Weaver
- June Weaver as Elviry Weaver
- Eily Malyon as Widow Smithers
- Minerva Urecal as Miranda
- Frank M. Thomas as August Huston
- Minerva Urecal as Miranda Wolfson
