= Jeepers Creepers (1939 live-action film) =

1939 film

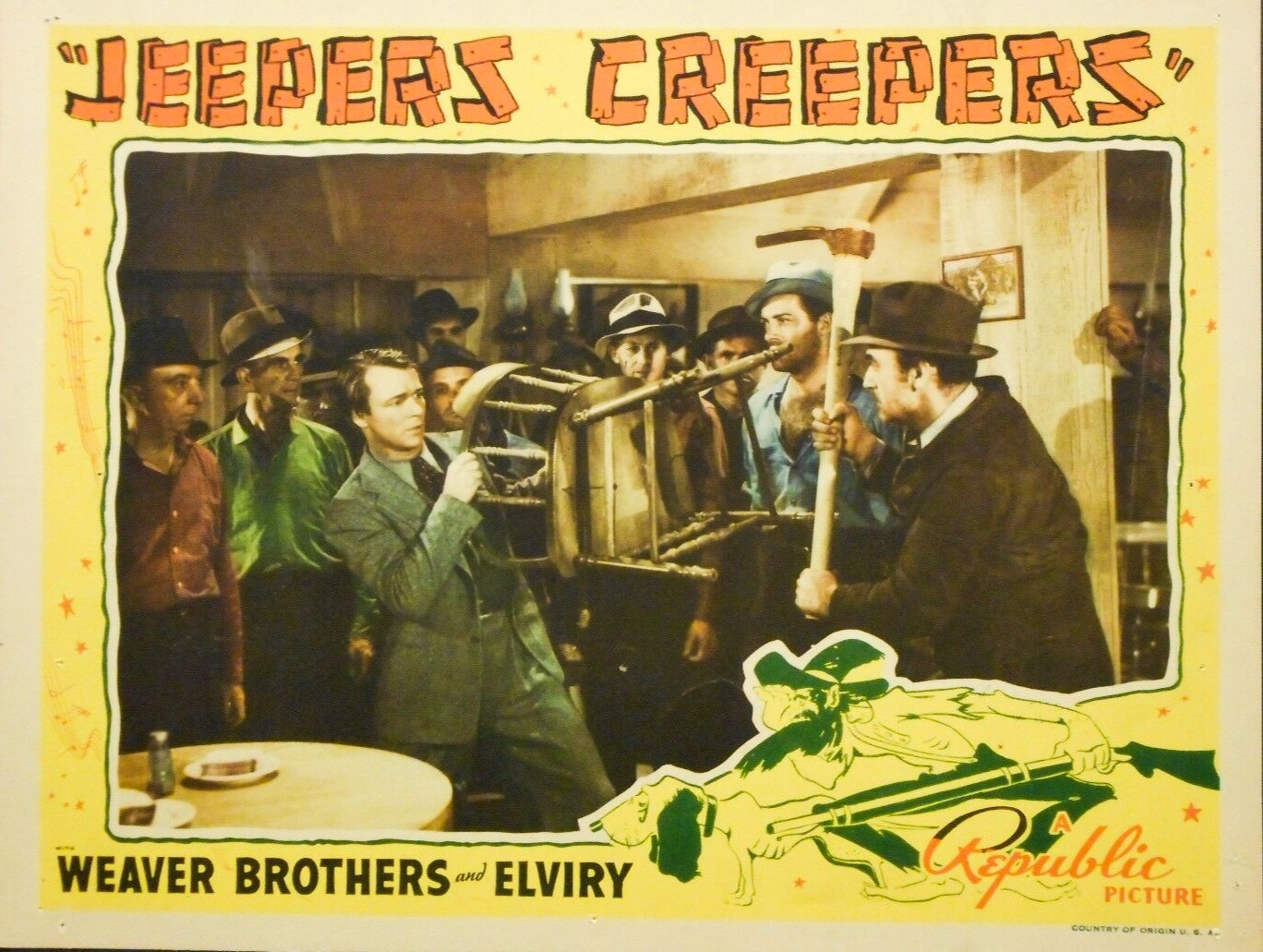
- Theatrical release poster
- Directed by: Frank Mcdonald
- Written by: Dorrell McGowan; Stuart E. McGowan
- Produced by: Armand Schaefer
- Starring: Roy Rogers
- Cinematography: Ernest Miller
- Edited by: Ernest J. Nims
- Music by: James Wessel
- Production company: Republic Pictures
- Distributed by: Republic Pictures
- Release date: October 27, 1939
- Running time: 69 minutes
- Country: United States
- Language: English

Jeepers Creepers is a 1939 American musical comedy starring Roy Rogers, with the popular hillbilly comedy troupe the Weaver Brothers and Elviry. Rogers plays a Sheriff in a town where a rich industrialist cheats a poor family out of their land when coal is discovered there.

The unusual title refers to the 1938 song "Jeepers Creepers" by Harry Warren and Jerry Mercer, which Rogers and the cast sing during the film. The film also features "Little Brown Jug", "In the Shade of the Old Apple Tree", "Listen to the Mocking Bird", and "In the Good Old Summer Time".

== Plot ==
Wealthy industrialist M. K. Durant (Thurston Hall) discovers a rich vein of coal on the Pineville property owned by the Weavers. When the family refuses to sell their property to him, he discovers the Weavers owe back taxes. Durant pays them, takes possession of their land and begins mining. Sheriff Roy and the rest of Pineville's citizens come up with a plan to drive Durant and his miners away. The miners retaliate by starting a forest fire. Durant is trapped under his car when it overturns in the path of the fire. After he is saved by the sheriff and the townspeople, Durant relents; he stops his mining operations and returns the land to the Weavers. Durant's daughter, Connie (Maris Wrixon), and Sheriff Roy have also fallen in love to make this a very happy ending.

== Cast ==
photo from film

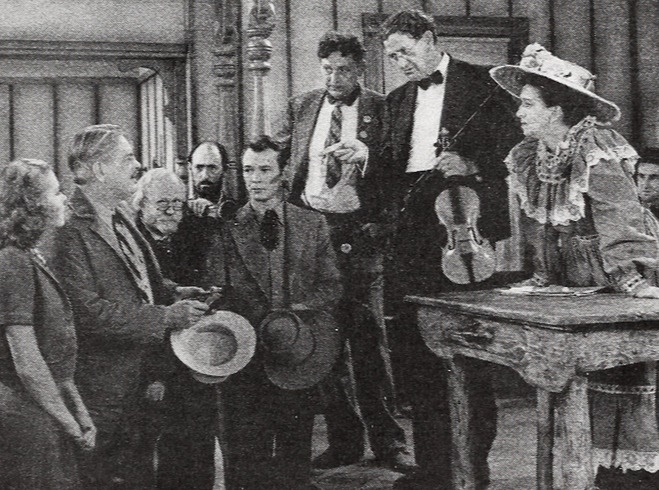
photo from film

- Roy Rogers as Sheriff Roy Rogers
- Leon Weaver as Abner Weaver
- Frank Weaver as Cicero Weaver
- June Weaver as Elviry Weaver
- Loreitta Weaver as Violey Weaver
- Maris Wrixon as Connie Durant
- Thurston Hall as M.K. Durant
- Lucien Littlefield as Grandpa
- Billy Lee as Skeeter
- Johnny Arthur as Peabody
- Bud Geary as Gangster
- Ralph Sanford as Gangster
- Milton Kibbee as Townsman
- Gladys Gale as Townswoman
- Joe McGuinn as Gangster
- Robert J. Wilke as Gangster (as Bob Wilke)
- Curley Dresden as Hillbilly

== Reception ==
Showmen's Trade Review wrote, "For the great masses of American theatergoers, Jeepers Creepers should provide thoroughly enjoyable entertainment. It's loaded with hokum [...] making the film as a whole anything but a critic's delight; but as far as the average family is concerned, it's solid homespun comedy-drama right down their alley." The Film Daily agreed, stating that "This picture will probably be all right for the backwoods nabes, but for city and suburban houses it does not measure up as interesting screenfare. The story is tried and true, but bewhiskered to its knees and without any unusual or novel twists." Additionally, The New York Daily News found the film "too wobbly to stand alone, in this section of the country anyway [...] This Republic story about a rugged individualist taking advantage of the poor mountaineers has long gray whiskers down to here."
