= Friendly Neighbors =

- Theatrical release poster
- Directed by: Nick Grinde
- Screenplay by: Dorrell McGowan; Stuart E. McGowan
- Story by: Dorrell McGowan; Stuart E. McGowan
- Produced by: Armand Schaefer
- Starring: Leon Weaver; Frank Weaver; June Weaver; Lois Ranson; Spencer Charters; Cliff Edwards
- Cinematography: Ernest Miller
- Edited by: Charles Craft
- Music by: Dave Torbett
- Production company: Republic Pictures
- Distributed by: Republic Pictures
- Release date: November 17, 1940
- Running time: 67 minutes
- Country: United States
- Language: English

Friendly Neighbors is a 1940 American comedy film directed by Nick Grinde and written by Dorrell McGowan and Stuart E. McGowan. The film stars the vaudeville comedy troupe the Weaver Brothers and Elviry, with Lois Ranson, Spencer Charters and Cliff Edwards. The film was released on November 17, 1940, by Republic Pictures.

== Cast ==
- Leon Weaver as Abner Weaver
- Frank Weaver as Cicero Weaver
- June Weaver as Elviry Weaver
- Lois Ranson as Nancy Williams
- Spencer Charters as Bumblebee Hibbs
- Cliff Edwards as Notes
- John Hartley as Breeze Kid
- Loretta Weaver as Violey Weaver
- Al Shean as Doc
- Thurston Hall as The Governor
- Margaret Seddon as Martha Williams
- Clarence Wilson as Silas Barton
- J. Farrell MacDonald as Sheriff Potts
- Al St. John as Smokey
