= Song of the Prairie =

1945 film by Ray Nazarro

- Theatrical release poster
- Directed by: Ray Nazarro
- Screenplay by: J. Benton Cheney
- Produced by: Colbert Clark
- Starring: Ken Curtis; June Storey; Andy Clyde; Guinn "Big Boy" Williams; Jeff Donnell; Grady Sutton; Thurston Hall
- Cinematography: George F. Kelley
- Edited by: Otto Meyer
- Production company: Columbia Pictures
- Distributed by: Columbia Pictures
- Release date: September 27, 1945
- Running time: 62 minutes
- Country: United States
- Language: English

Song of the Prairie is a 1945 American Western film directed by Ray Nazarro and written by J. Benton Cheney. The film stars Ken Curtis, June Storey, Andy Clyde, Guinn "Big Boy" Williams, Jeff Donnell, Grady Sutton and Thurston Hall. The film was released on September 27, 1945, by Columbia Pictures.

A preserved print is in the Library of Congress collection.

== Plot ==
Joan Wingate's father, who is affluent, disapproves of his daughter pursuing a career in the entertainment industry. While on a vacation in the western region, Joan secures a position with Dan Tyler's show and financially supports it with her family's resources. Amidst various musical performances, they strive to keep Joan's father from discovering her involvement in the show. However, he eventually learns about it and decides that they will head back to the eastern part of the country.

== Cast ==
- Ken Curtis as Dan Tyler
- June Storey as Joan Wingate
- Andy Clyde as Uncle Andy Tyler
- Guinn "Big Boy" Williams as Big Boy Jackson
- Jeff Donnell as Penelope 'Penny' Stevens
- Grady Sutton as William Van Welby
- Thurston Hall as Jerome Wingate
- Deuce Spriggins as Band Leader Deuce
- Carolina Cotton as Carolina
- Paul Trietsch as Hezzie
- Ken Trietsch as Ken
- Gil Taylor as Gil
- Charles Ward as Gabe
