= Mountain Moonlight =

1941 film by Nick Grinde

- Theatrical release poster
- Directed by: Nick Grinde
- Screenplay by: Mauri Grashin; John W. Krafft; Dorrell McGowan; Stuart E. McGowan
- Produced by: Armand Schaefer
- Starring: Leon Weaver; Frank Weaver; June Weaver; Betty Jane Rhodes; John Archer; Kane Richmond
- Cinematography: Jack A. Marta
- Edited by: Charles Craft
- Music by: Mort Glickman
- Production company: Republic Pictures
- Distributed by: Republic Pictures
- Release date: July 12, 1941
- Running time: 68 minutes
- Country: United States
- Language: English

Mountain Moonlight is a 1941 American comedy film directed by Nick Grinde and written by Mauri Grashin, John W. Krafft, Dorrell McGowan and Stuart E. McGowan. The film stars the vaudeville comedy troupe the Weaver Brothers and Elviry, with Betty Jane Rhodes, John Archer and Kane Richmond. The film was released on July 12, 1941, by Republic Pictures.

== Cast ==
- Leon Weaver as Abner Weaver
- Frank Weaver as Cicero Weaver
- June Weaver as Elviry Weaver
- Betty Jane Rhodes as Carol Weaver
- John Archer as Dr. Ed
- Kane Richmond as Paul Conrad
- Frank Sully as Bill Jackson
- Johnny Arthur as Holbrook
- Loretta Weaver as Violey Weaver
- George Ernest as Johnny Weaver
- Andrew Tombes as Sen. Marvin
- George Chandler as Steve Brown
- Harry Hayden as Lawyer Talbot
- Roscoe Ates as Gardener
- Leonard Carey as Briggs
- George Meeker as Long
- Edwin Stanley as Randolph
