= Silver City Kid =

1944 film by John English

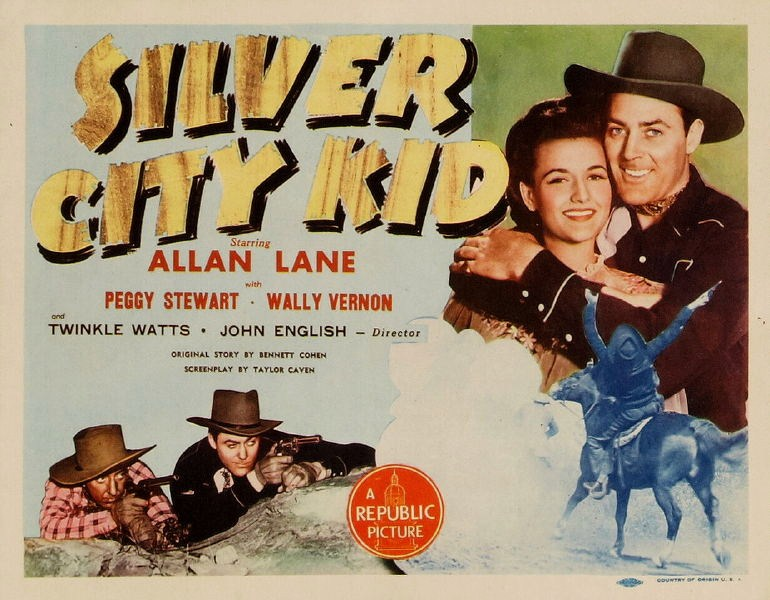
- Lobby card
- Directed by: John English
- Screenplay by: Taylor Caven
- Story by: Bennett Cohen
- Produced by: Stephen Auer
- Starring: Allan Lane; Peggy Stewart; Wally Vernon; Twinkle Watts; Harry Woods; Frank Jaquet
- Cinematography: Reggie Lanning
- Edited by: Charles Craft
- Music by: Joseph Dubin
- Production company: Republic Pictures
- Distributed by: Republic Pictures
- Release date: July 20, 1944
- Running time: 55 minutes
- Country: United States
- Language: English

Silver City Kid is a 1944 American Western film directed by John English and written by Taylor Caven. Starring Allan Lane, Peggy Stewart, Wally Vernon, Twinkle Watts, Harry Woods and Frank Jaquet, it was released on July 20, 1944, by Republic Pictures.

== Cast ==
- Allan Lane as Jack Adams
- Peggy Stewart as Ruth Clayton
- Wally Vernon as Wildcat Higgens
- Twinkle Watts as Twinkle Clayton
- Harry Woods as Judge Sam H. Ballard
- Frank Jaquet as William Stoner
- Lane Chandler as Steve Clayton
- Glenn Strange as Henchman Garvey
- Bud Geary as Henchman Yeager
- Tom Steele as Henchman Utah
- Tom London as Sheriff Gibson
- Jack Kirk as Tom
- Sam Flint as Business Man
