= Down in 'Arkansaw' =

1938 film by Nick Grinde

- Theatrical release poster
- Directed by: Nick Grinde
- Screenplay by: Dorrell McGowan; Stuart E. McGowan
- Story by: Dorrell McGowan; Stuart E. McGowan
- Produced by: Armand Schaefer
- Starring: Ralph Byrd; Leon Weaver; June Weaver; Frank Weaver; June Storey; Pinky Tomlin
- Cinematography: Ernest Miller
- Edited by: William Morgan
- Music by: Dave Torbett
- Production company: Republic Pictures
- Distributed by: Republic Pictures
- Release date: October 8, 1938
- Running time: 72 minutes
- Country: United States
- Language: English

Down in 'Arkansaw' is a 1938 American comedy film directed by Nick Grinde and written by Dorrell McGowan and Stuart E. McGowan. The film stars Ralph Byrd with the vaudeville comedy troupe the Weaver Brothers and Elviry, along with June Storey and Pinky Tomlin. The film was released October 8, 1938, by Republic Pictures.

== Cast ==
- Ralph Byrd as John Parker
- Leon Weaver as Abner Weaver
- June Weaver as Elviry Weaver
- Frank Weaver as Cicero Weaver
- June Storey as Mary Weaver
- Pinky Tomlin as Pinky
- Berton Churchill as Judge
- Guinn "Big Boy" Williams as Juble Butler
- Walter Miller as Marks
- Gertrude Green as Elsie
- Selmer Jackson as Edwards
- Arthur Loft as Turner
- Ivan Miller as Lewis
- John Dilson as Graves
- Al Bridge as Jake
- Karl Hackett as Wilkins
