= The Old Homestead (1942 film) =

1942 film by Frank McDonald

- Directed by: Frank McDonald
- Screenplay by: Dorrell McGowan; Stuart E. McGowan
- Produced by: Armand Schaefer
- Starring: Leon Weaver; Frank Weaver; June Weaver; Dick Purcell; Jed Prouty; Anne Jeffreys
- Cinematography: Ernest Miller
- Edited by: Arthur Roberts
- Music by: Mort Glickman
- Production company: Republic Pictures
- Distributed by: Republic Pictures
- Release date: August 17, 1942
- Running time: 67 minutes
- Country: United States
- Language: English

The Old Homestead is a 1942 American comedy film directed by Frank McDonald and written by Dorrell McGowan and Stuart E. McGowan. The film stars the vaudeville comedy troupe the Weaver Brothers and Elviry, with Dick Purcell, Jed Prouty and Anne Jeffreys. The film was released on August 17, 1942, by Republic Pictures.

== Cast ==
- Leon Weaver as Abner Weaver
- Frank Weaver as Cicero Weaver
- June Weaver as Mayor Elviry Weaver
- Dick Purcell as Scarf Lennin
- Jed Prouty as Councilman Bell
- Anne Jeffreys as Goldie
- Maris Wrixon as Mary Jo Weaver
- Robert Conway as Fred Morgan
- Linda Bent as Bunny
