= In Old Missouri =

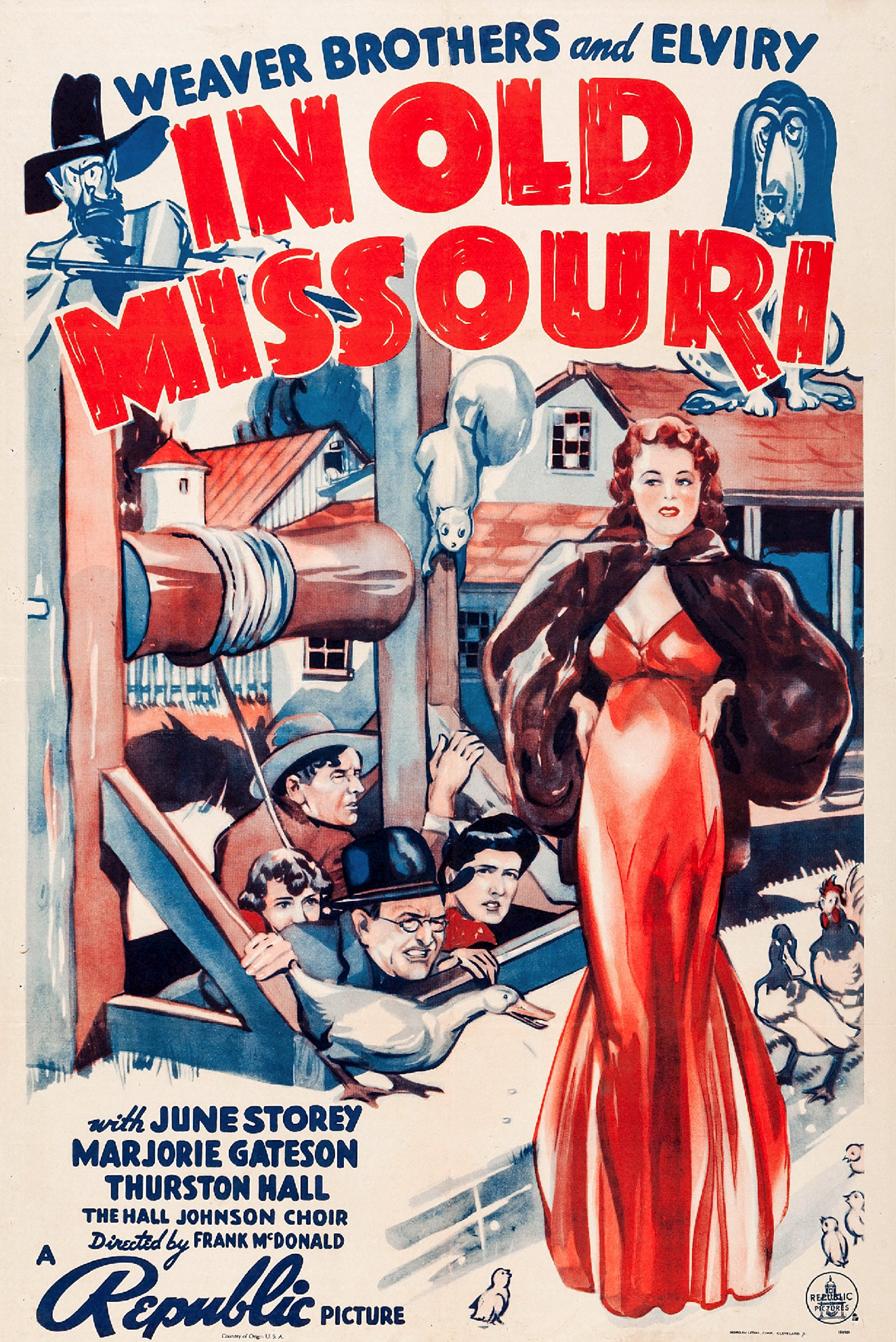
- Film poster
- Directed by: Frank McDonald
- Written by: Dorrell McGowan; Stuart E. McGowan
- Starring: Leon Weaver; Frank Weaver; June Weaver; Alan Ladd; Marjorie Gateson; June Storey; Thurston Hall; Hall Johnson Choir
- Distributed by: Republic Pictures
- Release date: April 17, 1940
- Running time: 68 minutes
- Country: United States
- Language: English

In Old Missouri (1940) is a film starring the hillbilly comedy troupe the Weaver Brothers and Elviry, and released by Republic Pictures.

Brothers Leon "Abner" Weaver and Frank "Cicero" Weaver, with Frank's wife June "Elviry" Weaver, were vaudeville comedians who starred in a series of Republic films. A young Alan Ladd plays a featured role.

== Plot ==
A family of sharecroppers, the Weavers, takes up residence in the home of a rich man named Pittman after they are forced off their land. They sell off Mrs. Pittman's furs and meet Junior Pittman's troupe of dancing girls. After they befriend Mr. Pittman, they persuade him to play dead until he can learn exactly how the rest of his family feels about him.

== Cast ==
- Leon Weaver as Abner
- Frank Weaver as Cicero
- June Weaver as Elviry
- Thurston Hall as Mr. Pittman
- Marjorie Gateson as Mrs. Pittman
- Alan Ladd as Junior Pittman
- June Storey as Mary
