= Shepherd of the Ozarks =

1942 film by Frank McDonald

- Theatrical release poster
- Directed by: Frank McDonald
- Screenplay by: Dorrell McGowan; Stuart E. McGowan
- Produced by: Armand Schaefer
- Starring: Leon Weaver; Frank Weaver; June Weaver; Marilyn Hare; Frank Albertson; Thurston Hall
- Cinematography: Ernest Miller
- Edited by: Charles Craft
- Music by: Mort Glickman
- Production company: Republic Pictures
- Distributed by: Republic Pictures
- Release date: March 26, 1942
- Running time: 70 minutes
- Country: United States
- Language: English

Shepherd of the Ozarks is a 1942 American comedy film directed by Frank McDonald and written by Dorrell McGowan and Stuart E. McGowan. The film stars the vaudeville comedy troupe the Weaver Brothers and Elviry, with Marilyn Hare, Frank Albertson and Thurston Hall. The film was released on March 26, 1942, by Republic Pictures.

== Plot ==
An Army Air Corp pilot has to bail out of his plane over the Ozarks. There he falls in love while his father tries to exploit mineral rights in the area that are desperately needed for the war effort.

== Cast ==
- Leon Weaver as Abner
- Frank Weaver as Cicero
- June Weaver as Elviry
- Marilyn Hare as Susanna Weaver
- Frank Albertson as Lieutenant James J. 'Jimmy' Maloney Jr.
- Thurston Hall as James Maloney
- Johnny Arthur as Doolittle
- William Haade as Dudd Hitt
- Wade Crosby as Kirk
- Joe Devlin as Louie
- Fred Sherman as Scully
- Guy Usher as General Tobin
