= Mountain Rhythm (1943 film) =

1943 film by Frank McDonald

- Theatrical release poster
- Directed by: Frank McDonald
- Screenplay by: Dorrell McGowan; Stuart E. McGowan
- Story by: Ray Harris
- Produced by: Armand Schaefer
- Starring: Leon Weaver; Frank Weaver; June Weaver; Lynn Merrick; Frank M. Thomas; Sally Payne
- Cinematography: Ernest Miller
- Edited by: Richard L. Van Enger
- Music by: Mort Glickman
- Production company: Republic Pictures
- Distributed by: Republic Pictures
- Release date: January 8, 1943
- Running time: 70 minutes
- Country: United States
- Language: English

Mountain Rhythm is a 1943 American comedy film directed by Frank McDonald and written by Dorrell McGowan and Stuart E. McGowan. The film stars the vaudeville comedy troupe the Weaver Brothers and Elviry, with Lynn Merrick, Frank M. Thomas and Sally Payne. The film was released on January 8, 1943, by Republic Pictures.

== Cast ==
- Leon Weaver as Abner Weaver
- Frank Weaver as Cicero Weaver
- June Weaver as Elviry Weaver
- Lynn Merrick as Linda Weaver
- Frank M. Thomas as Dr. Elihu Prindle
- Sally Payne as Fanniebelle Weaver
- Dick Jones as Darwood Gates Alton
- Joseph Allen as Bill Burgess
- William Roy as Humphrey Davidson Pepperfield IV
- Earle S. Dewey as Forsythe
- Sam Flint as Pierce
- Ben Erway as Alton
