= Al Taylor (actor) =

American actor (1887–1951)

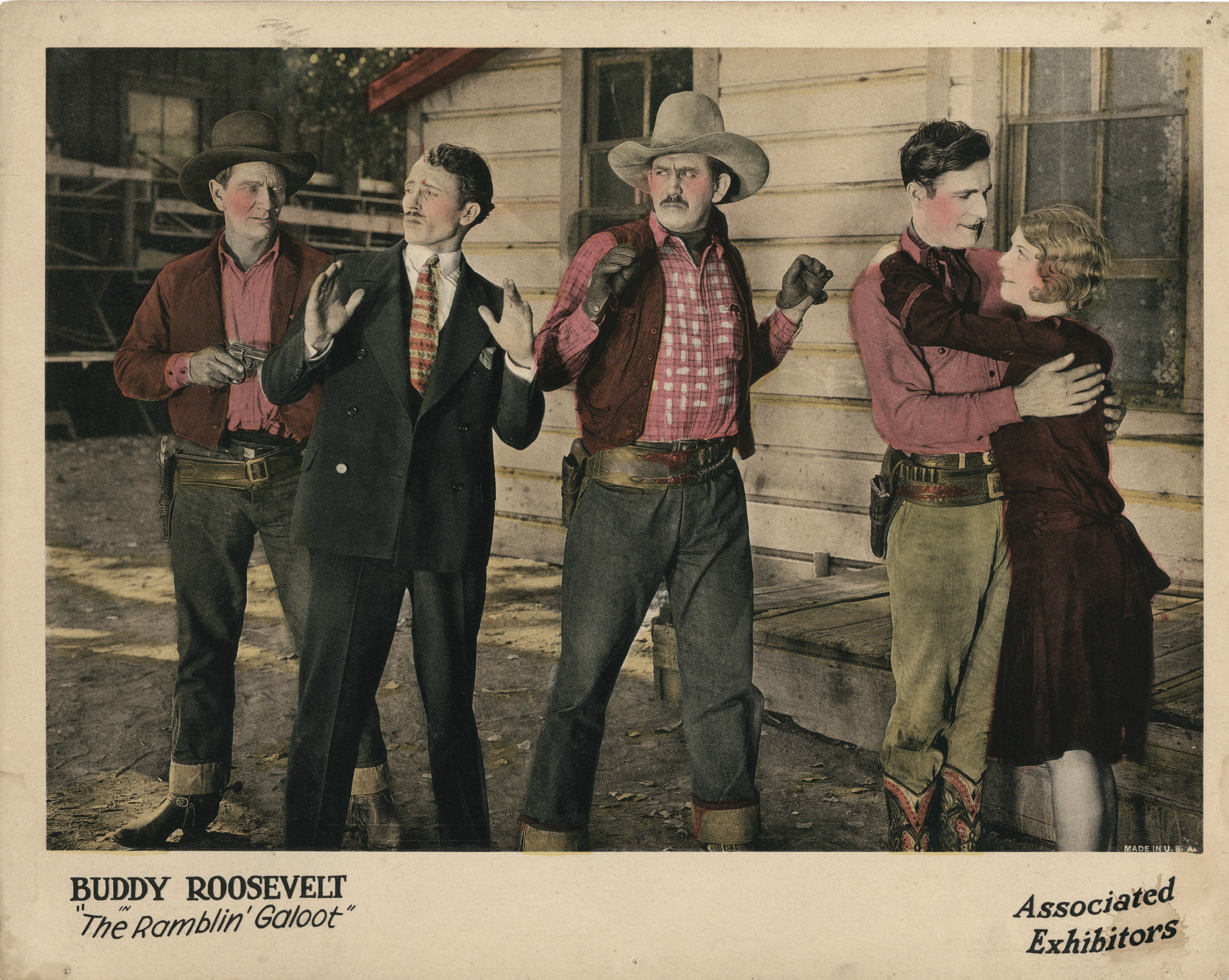
- Al Taylor (second from the left) in The Ramblin' Galoot (1926)
- Born: August 29, 1887; Boston, Massachusetts, United States
- Died: March 2, 1951 (aged 63); West Los Angeles, California, United States
- Occupation: Actor
- Years active: 1926–48

Al Taylor (August 8, 1887 – March 2, 1951) was an American character actor during the silent and sound film eras.

== Biography ==
Born in Boston in 1887, Taylor began in films with a small role in the 1926 silent film, The Fighting Cheat, starring Wally Wales and Jean Arthur. During his career he appeared in over 200 films, mostly in small, uncredited roles. The vast majority of his roles were in Westerns, such as The Lawless Nineties (1936), starring John Wayne, 1940's Heroes of the Saddle, a The Three Mesquiteers' film, and the 1942 Roy Rogers film, Man from Cheyenne.

== Filmography ==
(Per AFI database)

- The Fighting Cheat (1926) ... Cook
- The Bandit Buster (1926) ... Hotel clerk
- The Bonanza Buckaroo (1926) ... Carney
- The Dangerous Dub (1926) ... Scar-Face Hanan
- Rawhide (1926) ... Jim Reep
- The Ramblin' Galoot (1926)
- Soda Water Cowboy (1927) ... Joe
- The Interferin' Gent (1927) ... Ben Douglas
- Between Dangers (1927) ... Charlie
- The Ballyhoo Buster (1928)
- Desperate Courage (1928)
- The Utah Kid (1930)
- Quick Trigger Lee (1931) ... Red
- The Avenger (1931)
- The Range Feud (1931)
- The Fighting Fool (1932)
- Come On, Tarzan (1932)
- The Saddle Buster (1932) ... Blackie
- Ghost Valley (1932) ... Henchman
- Law and Lawless (1932)
- Unknown Valley (1933)
- Little Man, What Now? (1934) ... Cashier
- Westward Ho (1935)
- The Lawless Nineties (1936) ... Red
- Guns and Guitars (1936)
- The Cattle Thief (1936)
- Ranger Courage (1936)
- Rio Grande Ranger (1936)
- Roarin' Guns (1936)
- The Traitor (1936)
- The Unknown Ranger (1936)
- Come On, Cowboys (1937)
- Billy the Kid Returns (1938)
- Call the Mesquiteers (1938)
- Gold Mine in the Sky (1938)
- The Man from Music Mountain (1938) ... Hank
- Prairie Moon (1938)
- The Lone Ranger Rides Again (1939)
- Mexicali Rose (1939)
- Mountain Rhythm (1939)
- Wyoming Outlaw (1939)
- The Carson City Kid (1940)
- Covered Wagon Days (1940)
- Dark Command (1940)
- Ghost Valley Raiders (1940)
- Heroes of the Saddle (1940) ... Hendericks
- Mysterious Doctor Satan (1940)
- Oklahoma Renegades (1940)
- Gangs of Sonora (1941)
- Jesse James at Bay (1941) ... Frank James
- Outlaws of Cherokee Trail (1941)
- Robin Hood of the Pecos (1941)
- Sheriff of Tombstone (1941)
- Two Gun Sheriff (1941)
- Call of the Canyon (1942) ... Rancher
- The Cyclone Kid (1942)
- Man from Cheyenne (1942) ... Ranch hand
- Outlaws of Pine Ridge (1942) ... Roberts
- The Phantom Plainsmen (1942) ... Heavy
- Code of the Outlaw (1942) ... Joe
- Prairie Pals (1942)
- Raiders of the Range (1942) ... Jensen
- Sheriff of Sage Valley (1942)
- Stagecoach Express (1942)
- The Yukon Patrol (1942)
- Beyond the Last Frontier (1943)
- Black Hills Express (1943)
- The Blocked Trail (1943)
- Westward Ho (1942) ... Hank
- Calling Wild Bill Elliott (1943) ... Guard
- Death Valley Manhunt (1943) ... Lawson
- The Black Hills Express (1943) ... Denver
- Dead Man's Gulch (1943) ... Buck Lathrop
- The Man from Thunder River (1943) ... Deputy
- Raiders of Sunset Pass (1943)
- Santa Fe Scouts (1943) ... Curt
- Thundering Trails (1943)
- Wolves of the Range (1943)
- Marshal of Reno (1944) ... Brown
- Stagecoach to Monterey (1944)
