= Young Bill Hickok =

- Directed by: Joseph Kane
- Written by: Olive Cooper (original screenplay); Norton S. Parker (original screenplay)
- Produced by: Joseph Kane (associate producer)
- Starring: Roy Rogers
- Cinematography: William Nobles
- Edited by: Lester Orlebeck
- Production company: Republic Pictures
- Distributed by: Republic Pictures
- Release date: October 21, 1940 (United States)
- Running time: 59 minutes 54 minutes
- Country: United States
- Language: English

Young Bill Hickok is a 1940 American Western film directed by Joseph Kane and starring Roy Rogers.

== Plot ==
An agent of an unspecified foreign power (John Miljan) plots to take over California during the confusion of the American Civil War. He uses Morrell and his Overland Raiders to prevent news from reaching the east. The Raiders rustle the stagecoach and Pony Express horses from the various relay stations to cut all lines of communication to and from the east. Bill Hickok is sent out to one of the relay stations in hopes that he would be able to keep the ponies from the raiders. Calamity and Gabby, horse traders for the relay stations, ride up with their Indian helpers just as Bill finishes off the last few Raiders that had attacked his post. Bill has been severely hurt so Calamity and Gabby stick around for a while.

During this time, Bill's old fiancée, Louise Mason, shows up. She wants to make up after their breaking their engagement over her support for the Confederacy and Bil's for the North. They agree to forget the war; she and Bill are soon planning a wedding. However, Marshal Evans, head of the communication lines, wants Bill to take a shipment of gold through to the east to support the Federal war effort.

Bill knows it's too dangerous to actually take it himself, the raiders would be sure to get it, so he sends the gold with Gabby and Calamity while pretending to take it himself. The plan backfires when Louise tells Tower that Bill isn't taking the gold to protect Bill from attack. The Raiders attack Gabby and get away with the gold. Bill gets worried when the Raiders don't attack him so he returns to town to see what happened to Gabby. The Marshal wants to know what went wrong and Bill asks for half an hour to find out. After he leaves, Tower convinces the men that Bill is really at the head of the Raiders and that he was getting away. Gabby overhears their conversation so he rides to warn Bill.

Bill gets away for the time being but is captured when he returns to town to search Tower's office. Gabby helps him escape and they see Tower escaping with the gold and the Raiders. Riding back to the posse that pursued them, Bill convinces Marshal to follow them. With Tower and the Raiders locked up and the Civil War ended, Bill and Louise finally get married.

== Cast ==
- Roy Rogers as "Wild" Bill Hickok
- George 'Gabby' Hayes as "Gabby" Whitaker
- Julie Bishop as Louise Mason
- John Miljan as Nicholas Tower
- Sally Payne as Miss "Calamity" Jane Canary
- Archie Twitchell as Phillip
- Monte Blue as Marshal Evans
- Hal Taliaferro as Morrell
- Ethel Wales as Mrs. Stout
- Jack Ingram as Henchman Red Burke
- Monte Montague as Charlie Majors

== Soundtrack ==
- "Polly Wolly Doodle"
- Roy Rogers – "When the Shadows Fall Across the Rockies" (written by Peter Tinturin)
- Sally Payne and George "Gabby" Hayes – "Up and Down the Prairie" (written by Peter Tinturin)
- Roy Rogers – "A Cowboy Wedding" (written by Mila Sweet and Nat Vincent)
- Sally Payne – "Tamales" (written by Eddie Cherkose and Raoul Kraushaar)
- Roy Rogers – "I'll Keep on Singin' a Song"

== See also ==
- List of films and television shows about the American Civil War
