= Southward Ho =

1939 film

- Directed by: Joseph Kane
- Written by: Gerald Geraghty (writer); Jack Natteford (story); John Rathmell (story)
- Produced by: Joseph Kane (associate producer)
- Starring: Roy Rogers
- Cinematography: Jack A. Marta
- Edited by: Lester Orlebeck
- Distributed by: Republic Pictures
- Release date: March 19, 1939
- Running time: 58 minutes (original version); 54 minutes (edited version)
- Country: United States
- Language: English

Southward Ho is a 1939 American Western film directed by Joseph Kane and starring Roy Rogers.

== Plot ==
Towards the end of the War Between the States, Roy and Gabby are two Confederate cavalrymen who lure away a Union Army cavalry patrol in order to steal a cooked chicken and Union Colonel Denbigh's trousers.

Following the war the three meet again in Texas when the Colonel and Gabby are co-owners in a ranch. The Colonel is called back into service as a Military Governor to enforce the Reconstruction Acts against the former Confederates of the State. The cavalrymen assigned to the Colonel are all military criminals who use the opportunity to loot and terrorise the people for their own benefit. Roy attempts to convince the Colonel his men are acting unfairly. The Colonel's response is to remove the right of firearm ownership from the Texans with his men confiscating their weapons. The Colonel's men murder the Colonel and further attempt to tyrannise the population until Roy is able to get the population's firearms back.

== Cast ==
- Roy Rogers as Roy
- Lynne Roberts as Ellen Denbigh
- George 'Gabby' Hayes as Gabby Whitaker
- Wade Boteler as Colonel Denbigh
- Arthur Loft as Captain Jeffries
- Lane Chandler as Jim Crawford
- Tom London as Union sergeant
- Charles R. Moore as Skeeter
- Ed Brady as Mears

== Home media ==
On August 25, 2009, Alpha Video released Southward Ho on Region 0 DVD.

== See also ==
- List of films and television shows about the American Civil War
