= In Old Cheyenne (1941 film) =

1941 film by Joseph Kane

- Directed by: Joseph Kane
- Written by: John W. Krafft; Olive Cooper
- Produced by: Joseph Kane
- Starring: Roy Rogers; George "Gabby" Hayes; Joan Woodbury
- Cinematography: William Nobles
- Edited by: Charles Craft
- Music by: Cy Feuer
- Production company: Republic Pictures
- Distributed by: Republic Pictures
- Release date: April 4, 1941 (United States)
- Running time: 58 minutes 54 minutes
- Country: United States
- Language: English

In Old Cheyenne is a 1941 American Western film directed by Joseph Kane and starring Roy Rogers, George "Gabby" Hayes and Joan Woodbury. It was produced and distributed by Republic Pictures.

== Cast ==
- Roy Rogers as Steve Blane
- George "Gabby" Hayes as Arapaho Brown
- Joan Woodbury as Della Casey / Dolores Casino
- J. Farrell MacDonald as Tim Casey
- Sally Payne as "Squeak" Brown
- George Rosener as Sam Drummond
- William Haade as Henchman Davidge
- Hal Taliaferro as Henchman Pete
- Jack Kirk as Henchman Rufe

== Soundtrack ==
- "Bonita" (Music by Jule Styne, lyrics by Sol Meyer)
- "Linda Flor" (Written by Rudy Sooter and Aaron González)

== Bibliography ==
- Fetrow, Alan G. Feature Films, 1940-1949: a United States Filmography. McFarland, 1994.
