= Jay Novello =

American actor (1904–1982)

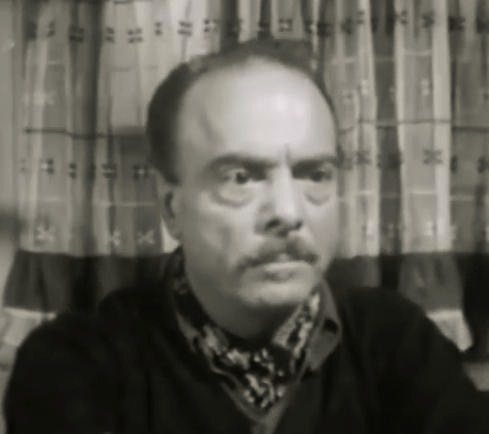
- Novello in This Rebel Breed (1960)
- Born: Michael Romano; August 22, 1904; Chicago, Illinois, U.S.
- Died: September 2, 1982 (aged 78); North Hollywood, California, U.S.
- Resting place: San Fernando Mission Cemetery
- Occupation: Actor
- Years active: 1930–1977
- Spouses: Rose Motto; Patricia C. (Lucy) Lewis (m. 1961)
- Children: 1

Jay Novello (born Michael Romano, August 22, 1904 – September 2, 1982) was an American radio, film, and television character actor.

== Radio career ==
Novello began his 47-year acting career in the 1930s, performing as a character on radio. He played Jack Packard on the Hollywood version of I Love a Mystery. He portrayed Cairo police Captain Sam Sabaaya on Rocky Jordan, Jamison the butler on the radio version of Lone Wolf, and Judge Glenn Hunter on One Man's Family. He also had roles on Escape, Crime Classics, Lux Radio Theater, Suspense, and Yours Truly, Johnny Dollar. He also played a recurring role as Mr. Negley, the mailman on the radio show My Favorite Husband.

== Film ==
During his film career, Novello's roles often alternated between pompous or fussy professionals and assorted ethnic characters, such as Italians, Spaniards, or Mexicans. One of his earliest and more familiar film appearances is in the 1945 Laurel and Hardy comedy The Bullfighters, in which Novello plays a Latin restaurateur.

Novello was limited mostly to bits in minor films, one of his notable being the officious Spanish consul in Frank Capra's Pocketful of Miracles (1961). Among his other movie credits are roles in such films as They Met in Bombay (1941), Beneath the 12-Mile Reef (1953), The Mad Magician (1954), Lisbon (1956), The Pride and the Passion (1957), This Rebel Breed (1960), The Lost World (1960), Escape from Zahrain (1962), The Man from the Diner's Club (1963), Sylvia (1965), Harum Scarum (1965), What Did You Do in the War, Daddy? (1966), The Caper of the Golden Bulls (1967), The Comic (1969) and The Domino Principle (1977).

== Television ==
Novello's first role as a guest star on television was on CBS's The George Burns and Gracie Allen Show in 1951. Besides several appearances on CBS's I Love Lucy and The Lucy Show, he appeared on NBC's Northwest Passage series and on the Western anthology series Frontier in the episode "The Texicans". About this time, he guest-starred in Crusader, a Cold War drama on CBS. He was cast in a 1955 episode as Andre in "Sock Plays Cupid" of the NBC sitcom, The People's Choice. In 1956 he played a murdered antiques dealer in the Screen Directors' Playhouse episode of Robert Louis Stevenson's Markheim.

In 1957, he guest-starred on the NBC detective series The Adventures of McGraw, originally titled Meet McGraw. In 1958, he was cast in five episodes as Juan Greco on ABC's Zorro, and in this same year played Gio Bartolo in the episode "Sidewalk Fisherman" in the ABC series Naked City. In 1959 he appeared on Wagon Train S3 E14 "The Lita Foladaire Story" as the artist Carlotti.

In 1960, he guest starred on the TV Western series Bat Masterson, playing a Scottish Sea Captain Angus MacLeod in S2E37's "Barbary Castle".

He also guest-starred in episodes of two ABC sitcoms, The Donna Reed Show as Nick Melinas in "The Love Letter" (1960) and on The Real McCoys, in which he plays the fiancé of Gladys Purvis, the widowed mother of Kate McCoy.

Between 1957 and 1960, Novello appeared as a skittish coroner in an episode of the ABC/Warner Brothers western series Maverick, also in Season 1, Episode 3 "According to Hoyle" as Henry Tree a private detective, also two episodes of the ABC/Warner Brothers western series.

He appeared in the ABC/WB detective series, Bourbon Street Beat. He guest-starred as Beanie in the 1958 episode "Arson" of the CBS crime drama, Richard Diamond, Private Detective. In 1962, he played coin collector Nickolas Trevelian in "The Case of the Captain's Coins". He appeared in the syndicated crime drama Johnny Midnight.

Novello guest starred twice on CBS's The Andy Griffith Show, as the main character in the episode entitled "Guest of Honor" and as an opportunist lawyer in "Otis Sues the County". He appeared on the television incarnation of Gangbusters as bank robber Willie Sutton. He was a regular on ABC's McHale's Navy as the con artist Mayor Mario Lugatto of Volta Fiore, Italy.

He appeared in the episode of Climax!, Escape From Fear, and had a recurring role on Zorro as Juan Greco. Novello also appeared in several episodes of the ABC/WB series Lawman. He was cast as Guido Morales in the 1960 episode "Unsurrendered Sword" on the ABC series The Rebel.

He appeared as well as a pompous Coin collector in the Perry Mason episode "The Case of the Captain's Coins". In a 1962 episode of The Andy Griffith Show, he played a thief passing through Mayberry to whom the city leaders unwittingly gave the Key to the City. He played the Frenchman "Verenne" in Season 1, Episode 14 "An Act of War" in the TV series, 12 O'Clock High. In 1964 he played Paul Lejeune, mayor of Bonnaire, in Season 3, Episode 14 "The Town That Went Away" in the TV series Combat!. In 1967 he played LaDuc, a Vichy official in Season 2, Episode 19 "The Decoy Raid" in the TV series The Rat Patrol. In 1969 he played Okun, an organ grinder, in Season 1, Episode 18 "The Night of Thrombeldinbar" of the science fiction series Land of the Giants. He also played a scheming personal injury attorney in a Season 4 episode of Ironside.

== Personal life and death ==
Novello's first marriage, to Rose Motto, ended in divorce. In 1961, he married Patricia C. Lewis and they remained together until his death from lung cancer in Riverside Hospital, North Hollywood, California, in 1982, aged 78. He is interred in Los Angeles, California, at the San Fernando Mission Cemetery.

== Selected filmography ==
- The Jade Box (1930, Serial) – Cultist (uncredited)
- It Had to Happen (1936) – Santoro (uncredited)
- Tenth Avenue Kid (1938) – Hobart
- Boys Town (1938) – Gangster (uncredited)
- Flirting with Fate (1938) – Manuel Del Valle
- Sergeant Madden (1939) – Prisoner on Train (uncredited)
- Calling All Marines (1939) – Lefty
- Forgotten Girls (1940) – Small Thug in Gorno's Office (uncredited)
- Girl from Havana (1940) – Manuel
- The Devil's Pipeline (1940) – Bandad
- The Border Legion (1940) – Santos
- Robin Hood of the Pecos (1941) – Stacy
- The Great Train Robbery (1941) – Santos
- Two Gun Sheriff (1941) – Marc Albo
- Sheriff of Tombstone (1941) – John Anderson – aka Joe Martinez
- They Met in Bombay (1941) – Bolo
- Citadel of Crime (1941) – Vince
- Bad Man of Deadwood (1941) – Monte Burns
- Unholy Partners (1941) – Dice Table Stickman (uncredited)
- Swamp Woman (1941) – 'Flash' Brand
- Sleepytime Gal (1942) – Chef Barzumium
- Broadway (1942) – Eddie (uncredited)
- Junior G-Men of the Air (1942, Serial) – Dogara, Farm Gate Guard (uncredited)
- Dr. Broadway (1942) – Greeny
- Cairo (1942) – Italian Officer (uncredited)
- Bells of Capistrano (1942) – Jenkins (uncredited)
- King of the Mounties (1942, Serial) – Lewis (Ch. 2–3)
- The Adventures of Smilin' Jack (1943, Serial) – Kushimi [Chs. 1–3, 12–13]
- Passport to Suez (1943) – Mr. Cezanne (uncredited)
- Sleepy Lagoon (1943) – Lug (uncredited)
- The Man from Music Mountain (1943) – Henchman Barker
- Phantom Lady (1944) – Anselmo (uncredited)
- Captain America (1944, Serial) – Simms [Ch. 1]
- The Great Alaskan Mystery (1944, Serial) – Eskimo Chief [Ch. 2–4]
- Dragon Seed (1944) – Japanese Soldier (uncredited)
- The Conspirators (1944) – Detective (uncredited)
- Mystery of the River Boat (1944, Serial) – Pierre
- Can't Help Singing (1944) – Sucker Buying Bell (uncredited)
- Hotel Berlin (1945) – Gomez (uncredited)
- The Bullfighters (1945) – Luis – Maitre d' (uncredited)
- Rhapsody in Blue (1945) – Orchestra Leader (uncredited)
- The Chicago Kid (1945) – Pinky
- Federal Operator 99 (1945, Serial) – Heinrick [Ch. 2]
- Behind City Lights (1945) – Nick (uncredited)
- Paris Underground (1945) – Member of the Underground (uncredited)
- Perilous Holiday (1946) – Luigi (uncredited)
- Port Said (1948) – Taurk
- Kiss the Blood Off My Hands (1948) – Sea Captain of Pelicano
- Tell It to the Judge (1949) – Gancellos (uncredited)
- Smuggler's Island (1951) – Espinosa
- Sirocco (1951) – Hamal (uncredited)
- The Sniper (1952) – Pete (uncredited)
- The Big Sky (1952) – Trapper (uncredited)
- Captain Pirate (1952) – Egyptian (uncredited)
- The Miracle of Our Lady of Fatima (1952) – António Abóbora dos Santos
- Cattle Town (1952) – Felipe Rojas
- Operation Secret (1952) – Herr Bauer
- The Iron Mistress (1952) – Judge Crain
- Ma and Pa Kettle on Vacation (1953) – Andre (uncredited)
- The Robe (1953) – Tiro (uncredited)
- Crime Wave (1953) – Dr. Otto Hessler
- The Diamond Queen (1953) – Gujar, Maya's steward
- Beneath the 12-Mile Reef (1953) – Sinan
- The Mad Magician (1954) – Frank Prentiss
- The Gambler from Natchez (1954) – René Garonne
- Sabaka (1954) – Damji
- The Prodigal (1955) – Merchant
- Son of Sinbad (1955) – Jiddah
- Bengazi (1955) – Basim
- Jaguar (1956) – Tupi
- Lisbon (1956) – Insp. Joao Casimiro Fonseca
- The Pride and the Passion (1957) – Ballinger
- The Perfect Furlough (1958) – Rene Valentin
- The Wonderful Country (1959) – Diego Casas
- This Rebel Breed (1960) – Papa Montalvo
- The Lost World (1960) – Costa
- Atlantis, the Lost Continent (1961) – Xandros the Greek Slave
- Pocketful of Miracles (1961) – Cortego
- Escape from Zahrain (1962) – Hassan
- The Man from the Diner's Club (1963) – Mooseghian
- Combat! (1964) – Mayor Paul Lejeune
- Sylvia (1965) – Father Gonzales
- The Art of Love (1965) – Janitor
- A Very Special Favor (1965) – Rene, French Barrister
- Harum Scarum (1965) – Zacha
- What Did You Do in the War, Daddy? (1966) – Mayor Romano
- The Caper of the Golden Bulls (1967) – Carlos
- The Comic (1969) – Miguel
- The Domino Principle (1977) – Captain Ruiz (final film role)

== Selected television ==
- I Love Lucy (1951) – Mr. Merriweather, theatre producer
- I Love Lucy (1954) – Mr. Beecher, tenant
- I Love Lucy (1956) – Mario, gondolier from Venice, Italy
- The Brady Bunch (1973) – Mr. Martinelli, bike shop owner
