= Sunset Serenade =

1942 film

- Theatrical release poster
- Directed by: Joseph Kane
- Screenplay by: Earl Felton
- Story by: Robert Yost
- Produced by: Joseph Kane
- Starring: Roy Rogers; George "Gabby" Hayes
- Cinematography: Bud Thackery
- Edited by: Arthur Roberts
- Production company: Republic Pictures
- Distributed by: Republic Pictures
- Release date: 14 September 1942 (United States)
- Running time: 58 minutes 54 minutes
- Country: United States
- Language: English

Sunset Serenade is a 1942 American Western film directed by Joseph Kane and starring Roy Rogers, and George "Gabby" Hayes.

== Plot ==
Vera Martin, a scheming housekeeper in her late twenties, receives orders to vacate the Bagley Ranch, over which she has held sway since the death of the owner. Bagley has left the ranch to his nephew Rodney T. Blackton, instead of to Vera as she had expected. Adjoining ranch owner Gregg Jackson arrives to offer his sympathy... and a possible way out. He plans to dam the river above the Bagley Ranch, diverting the water to his property leaving all the other ranchers dry and, while he is at it, to rustle all the Bagley cattle and fake a $5,000 mortgage on the ranch, licking new-owner Ridney T. before he starts. Roy Rogers, Gabby Whittaker and the Sons of the Pioneers, pass through the country just as Sylvia Clark, guardian of the one-year old Rodney T., arrives with her ward. They all arrive at the ranch just as Vera and Jackson are completing their frame-up. Roy is suspicious, and when Jackson informs Sylvia that the ranch is barren, has no cattle and a mortgage due in two weeks, Roy and his friends decide to stay and help. They find the stolen cattle and Roy sells them to government buyer Clifford Sheldon for enough money to clear the fake mortgage. Sheldon, discovering he has bought the same cattle from Jackson previously, starts an investigation.

== Cast ==
- Roy Rogers as Roy Rogers
- George "Gabby" Hayes as Gabby
- Bob Nolan as Bob
- Sons of the Pioneers as Ranch hands / Musicians
- Helen Parrish as Sylvia Clark
- Onslow Stevens as Gregg Jackson
- Joan Woodbury as Vera Martin
- Frank M. Thomas as Clifford Sheldon
- Roy Barcroft as Henchman Bart Reynolds
- Jack Kirk as Sheriff Praskins

== Soundtrack ==
- "Song of the San Joaquin" (Written by Tim Spencer)
- "I'm A Cowboy Rockefeller" (Written by Tim Spencer)
- "Mavourneen O'Shea" (Written by Tim Spencer)
- "He's A No-Good Son-of-a-Gun" (Written by Bob Nolan)
- "(Headin' For The)Home Corral" (Written by Bob Nolan)
- "Sandman Lullaby" (Written by Bob Nolan)
