= The Ranger and the Lady =

1940 film

- Theatrical release poster
- Directed by: Joseph Kane
- Written by: Stuart Anthony (writer); Gerald Geraghty (writer); Bernard McConville (story)
- Produced by: Joseph Kane (associate producer)
- Starring: Roy Rogers; George "Gabby" Hayes
- Cinematography: Reggie Lanning
- Edited by: Lester Orlebeck
- Production company: Republic Pictures
- Distributed by: Republic Pictures
- Release date: July 30, 1940 (United States)
- Running time: 59 minutes 54 minutes
- Country: United States
- Language: English

The Ranger and the Lady is a 1940 American Western film directed by Joseph Kane and starring Roy Rogers and George "Gabby" Hayes.

== Plot ==
Texas Ranger Captain Roy Colt (Roy Rogers) disapproves of the tactics of his superior, General Augustus LaRue (Henry Brandon), who is governing the Republic of Texas temporarily while Sam Houston (Davison Clark) is in Washington trying to get Texas admitted into the United States. LaRue is seeking to advance his own power, and he arbitrarily sets a tax on all wagons using the Santa Fe Trail (yes, check a map of the Republic of Texas before statehood), and orders Captain Colt and his Sergeant, Gabby Whittaker (George "Gabby" Hayes), to enforce this ruling. Colt, knowing that if he refuses he will be in no position to combat LaRue's outrageous plans, plays along. Among the first of the freighter wagon trains to be taxed is those belonging to Jane Tabor (Jacqueline Wells, before she became Julie Bishop) . When she and her old-time scout, Hank Purdy (Si Jenks), refuse to pay the tax, Colt places her under arrest and brings her before LaRue. But Jane charms LaRue into allowing her a monopoly of the freight lines using the Santa Fe Trail. Secretly, she is bent upon deposing LaRue, who was responsible for the death of her father. Colt misunderstands her motives, while she is equally contemptuous of his being a tool of LaRue. The other wagon train owners revolt and backed by Colt and Hank Purdy, who has deserted Jane because of her apparent bargain with LaRue, they use force to get the freight wagons through. Purdy is wounded and Jane comes to his aid. Through Gabby, Jane and Roy's misunderstanding are corrected, and they work together until LaRue's treachery is exposed and he is brought to justice.

== Cast ==
- Roy Rogers as Texas Ranger Captain Roy Colt
- George "Gabby" Hayes as Texas Ranger Sergeant Gabby Whittaker
- Julie Bishop as Jane Tabor (billed as Jacqueline Wells)
- Harry Woods as Kincaid
- Henry Brandon as General Augustus Larue
- Noble Johnson as Henchman El Lobo
- Si Jenks as Freighter Hank Purdy
- Ted Mapes as Henchman Kramer
- Yakima Canutt as Mack

== Soundtrack ==
- Roy Rogers - "As Long as We're Dancing" (Written by Peter Tinturin)
- Roy Rogers - "Chiquita" (Written by Peter Tinturin)
