= Bad Man of Deadwood =

1941 film by Joseph Kane

- Theatrical poster
- Directed by: Joseph Kane
- Written by: James R. Webb (writer)
- Produced by: Joseph Kane (associate producer)
- Starring: Roy Rogers
- Cinematography: William Nobles
- Edited by: Charles Craft
- Music by: Cy Feuer; Mort Glickman; Marlin Skiles
- Production company: Republic Pictures
- Distributed by: Republic Pictures
- Release date: 5 September 1941
- Running time: 61 minutes
- Country: United States
- Language: English

Bad Man of Deadwood is a 1941 American Western film directed by Joseph Kane and starring Roy Rogers.

== Plot ==
The town of Deadwood and its businesses are controlled by Ripper and his gang of thugs. Roy and Gabby enter the town to set up a show business but are run over by Ripper and his gang. When the going gets too tough Roy and Gabby fight back to bring the gang to the law with evidence.

== Cast ==
- Roy Rogers as Brett Starr aka Bill Brady
- George 'Gabby' Hayes as Prof. Mortimer "Gabby" Blackstone
- Carol Adams as Linda Barrett
- Henry Brandon as Ted Carver
- Herbert Rawlinson as Judge Gary
- Sally Payne as "Princess" Sally Blackstone
- Hal Taliaferro as Henchman Ripper
- Jay Novello as Monte Burns
- Horace Murphy as Seth Belden
- Monte Blue as Sheriff Jordan
- Ralf Harolde as Jake Marvel
- Jack Kirk as Clem Littlejohn

== Soundtrack ==
- Roy Rogers and Sally Payne - "Joe O'Grady" (Written by Jule Styne and Sol Meyer)
- Roy Rogers - "Home on the Rangeland" (Written by Rogers and Fred Rose)
- Roy Rogers - "Song of the Dusty Trail" (Written by Fred Rose and Ray Whitley)
