= Sally Payne =

American actress (1912–1999)

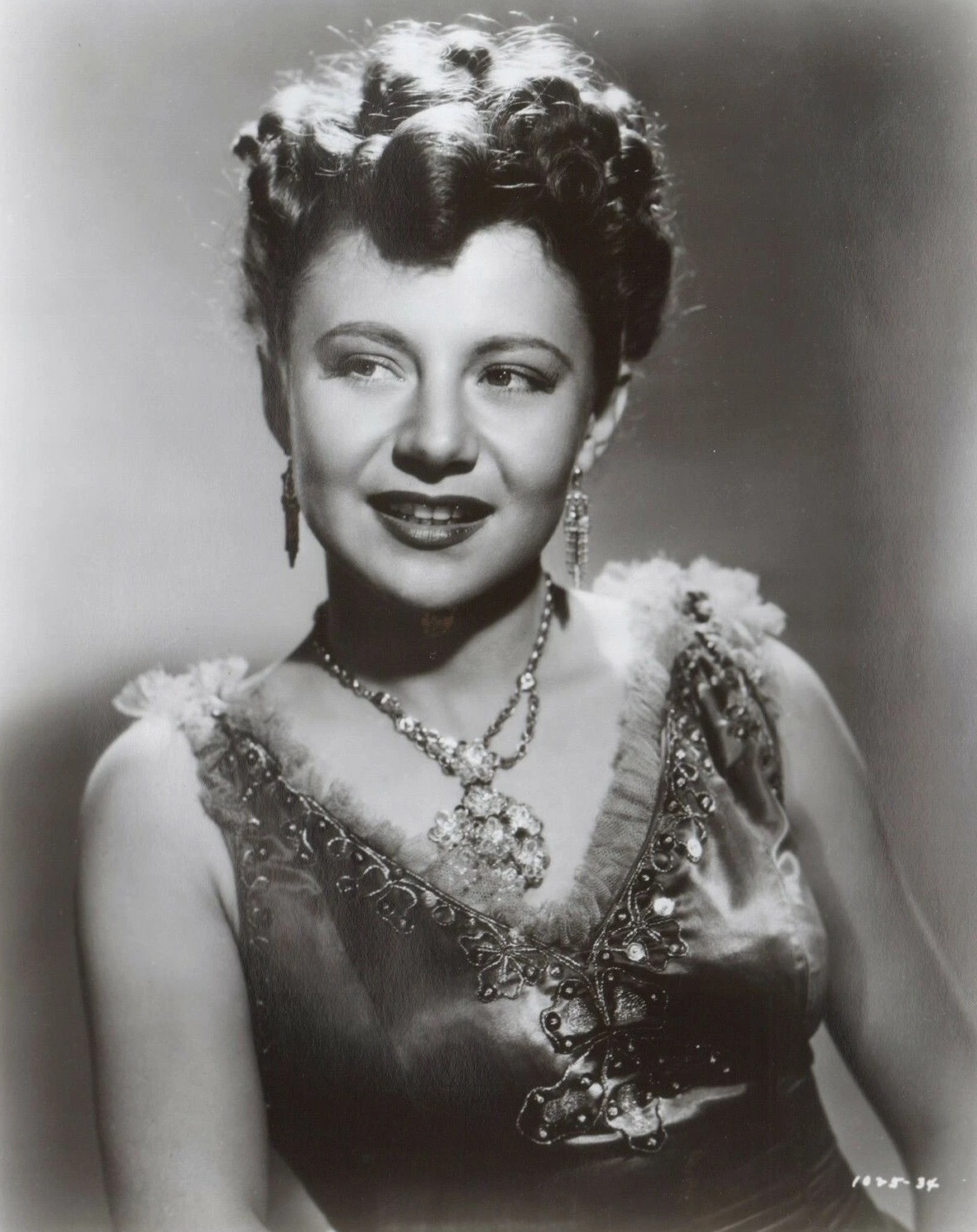
- Payne in 1941
- Born: September 5, 1912; Chicago, Illinois
- Died: May 8, 1999 (aged 86); Los Angeles, California
- Spouse(s): William Telaak (?-1941); Arthur F. Kelly (1942–1999)

Sally Payne (September 5, 1912 – May 8, 1999) was an American actress. She featured in several B-Westerns in the 1940s.

== Career ==
Payne worked as a model for artists before making her first film, Hollywood Hobbies (1935), where she appeared in the bit part of a tourist. She became a leading actress in B films, usually westerns. She also played in comedy shorts for RKO Radio Pictures (playing the on-screen wives of Edgar Kennedy and Leon Errol on several occasions) and Metro-Goldwyn-Mayer (in a number of Pete Smith subjects).She is most remembered for her performance as Calamity Jane in the Roy Rogers western Young Bill Hickok (1940), as well as acting the role of Belle Starr in Robin Hood of the Pecos (1941), where her performing style echoed that of a contemporary, Una Merkel. Just before her association with Rogers ended, her status had enlarged from a supporting-role character to that of first-billed actress.

Payne's characters were usually the tomboy type, often helping men rather than being dependent on them. She frequently wore men's clothing, carried a weapon, drove stagecoaches and rode horses. Her male associates identified strongly with her ability to survive a rough environment like the Old West frontier, but she was never the object of male fantasies. Rarely did Payne's characters become physically intimate with her masculine counterparts; thus if she were called on to display affection of any sort, the relationships never went beyond the strictly platonic. Thus, her persona was that of a female sidekick, but never a lover.

At one point in her career, when a studio told Payne to undergo a rhinoplasty, reporters interviewed her at Cedars of Lebanon Hospital, where she told them, "I've always found it a pretty good nose, but if they want to change it, I guess I'll let 'em do it. Things are that way in Hollywood."

== Later years ==
After Payne left acting, she ran her own book store and worked as an artist, creating oil paintings for her family and her friends and illustrating a series of children's books.

== Personal life ==
Payne retired from films in 1942 after her marriage to Arthur F. Kelly, an executive for Western Airlines. She had previously been married to William Telaak, a marriage that ended in divorce in 1941.

== Death ==
On May 8, 1999, Payne died in Los Angeles of a stroke at the age of 86.

== Partial filmography ==
- The Big Show (1936) - Toodles Brown
- Exiled to Shanghai (1937) - Mabel
- The Higgins Family (1938) - Lizzie
- The Man from Music Mountain (1938) - Patsy
- Blondie Meets the Boss (1939) - Mrs. Williams (uncredited)
- My Wife's Relatives (1939) - Lizzie
- When Tomorrow Comes (1939) - Waitress (uncredited)
- Blondie Brings Up Baby (1939) - Young Woman (uncredited)
- The Amazing Mr. Williams (1939) - Jean - Wedding Guest (uncredited)
- I Can't Give You Anything But Love, Baby (1940) - First Operator (uncredited)
- La Conga Nights (1940) - Lucy Endover
- When the Daltons Rode (1940) - Annabella
- I Love You Again (1940) - Salesgirl (uncredited)
- Money and the Woman (1940) - Mrs. Jones (uncredited)
- City for Conquest (1940) - Singer (uncredited)
- Young Bill Hickok (1940) - Miss Calamity Jane Canary
- One Night in the Tropics (1940) - Woman with Second Man Polled by Jim (uncredited)
- No, No, Nanette (1940) - Maid (uncredited)
- Robin Hood of the Pecos (1941) - Belle Starr
- In Old Cheyenne (1941) - Squeak Brown
- The Lady from Cheyenne (1941) - Chorus Girl (uncredited)
- Sheriff of Tombstone (1941) - Queenie Whittaker - aka Queenie LaTour
- Nevada City (1941) - Jo Morrison
- Bad Man of Deadwood (1941) - Princess Sally Blackstone
- Jesse James at Bay (1941) - Polly Morgan
- Tuxedo Junction (1941) - Pansy Weaver
- Red River Valley (1941) - Sally Whittaker
- Playmates (1941) - Gloria (uncredited)
- Man from Cheyenne (1942) - Sally Whittaker
- Romance on the Range (1942) - Sally
- Mountain Rhythm (1943) - Fanniebelle Weaver
- This Is the Life (1944) - Dolly (uncredited)
