= Young Buffalo Bill =

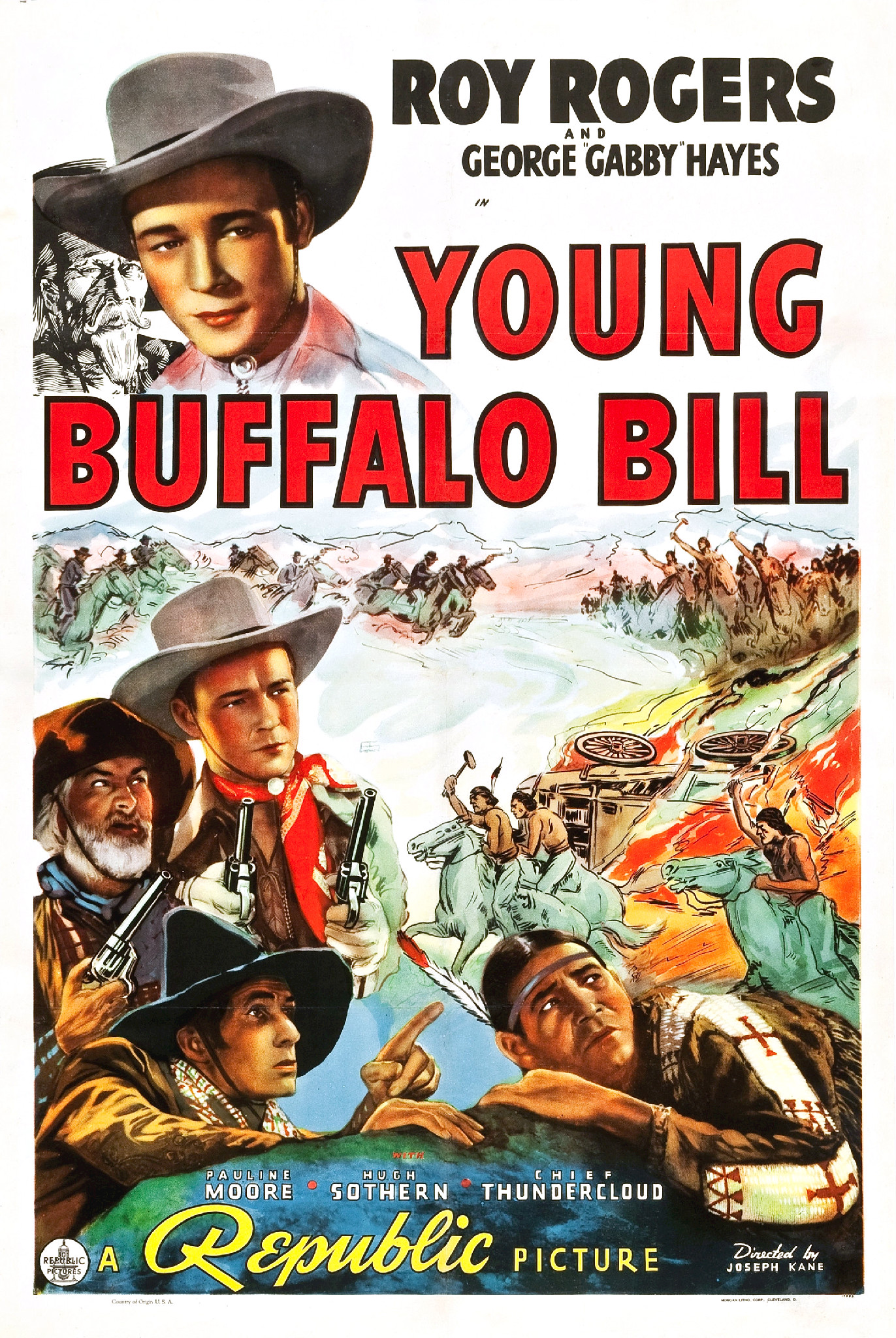
- Theatrical release poster
- Directed by: Joseph Kane
- Screenplay by: Harrison Jacobs; Robert Yost; Gerald Geraghty
- Story by: Norman Houston
- Produced by: Joseph Kane
- Starring: Roy Rogers; George "Gabby" Hayes
- Cinematography: William Nobles
- Edited by: Tony Martinelli
- Production company: Republic Pictures
- Distributed by: Republic Pictures
- Release date: April 12, 1940 (United States)
- Running time: 59 minutes 54 minutes
- Country: United States
- Language: English

Young Buffalo Bill is a 1940 American Western film directed by Joseph Kane and starring Roy Rogers and George "Gabby" Hayes.

== Plot ==
The film takes place in the New Mexico Territory of the United States in the 1860s. Bill Cody and his friend Gabby Whitaker arrive in the New Mexico territory sometime in the 1860s, Gabby feels the land is worthless as it is filled with nothing but “Injins and rocks”. Bill begins discussing Buffalo until he notices a woman driving a seemingly out of control carriage. Bill and Gabby stop the horses, but the woman berates them saying she didn't any help.

In town Bill and Gabby are talking about the previous events, when the woman overhears their conversation and introduces herself as Tonia Regas. Tonia asks both men what they are doing in Santa Fe and Bill says they were called to do a land survey by U.S Colonel, Joseph Calhoun. Upon hearing this Tonia leaves.

At Colonel Calhoun's homestead, Gabby introduces the Colonel to Bill. Calhoun reveals he knows Bill through his excellent reputation with the Pony Express and as a Buffalo hunter. Calhoun tells the men that his men have been having trouble with a medicine man named Akuna. Gabby and Bill agree to help.

Meanwhile Tonia arrives at her home where her grandfather, Don Regas tells her she must never go into town alone again. Don Regas then expresses his disdain with the survey by the American government to his friend Emelio Montez. Later, Montez sends a message to his half-brother, Akuna and Akuna's men ride out with rifles.

Akuna and his men meet with Montez. Akuna reveals they were born from the same mother, but Montez's father was a white man. Montez asks for the location of a gold mine the Regas' land. Akuna laments, saying the location is only for the chief, referring to himself, to know. Montez says he will find a way to acquire the land from Regas and claim the land for their tribe.

Later Colonel Calhoun's son Jerry arrives in Santa Fe. Colonel Calhoun introduces Jerry to Bill and Gabby, and then tells Jerry that although a more experienced is needed, he took a chance to help his son.

Jerry accompanies, the surveyors out to part of the Regas land where they are attacked by Akuna's men, but they make it out alive with only one man being injured. Back in town Jerry and Don Regas discuss the land agreement. Bill tells Tonia that the survey is only a formality and when the survey is all over the ranch will still belong to her family. Tonia and Bill help Jerry convince Don Regas to allow the survey and he complies.

Jerry spends his nights at a cantina gambling away his money. Bill expresses his concern with Jerry's habit, but Jerry rebuffs him. Jerry soon finds himself $4,000 in debt to the cantina. Montez takes advantages of Jerry's misfortune and offers to erase the debt if Jerry uses to survey to make sure the northern part of the Regas land is not part of the survey. Jerry forges the survey, saying the northern territory does not belong to Don Regas and it is free land.

Bill and Gabby arrive at the Regas house to inform them that the survey has been completed. He is not there, but Tonia offers to take Bill inside to discuss business. Bill tells Tonia the news as Don Regas walks in, both are angry and accuse Bill and the American government of trying to cheat them. An outraged Don Regas announces he will take his matter to Washington and makes preparations to leave in the morning. Tonia is distraught with Bill and says she never wants to see him again. Later Jerry meets with Montez. Jerry knows that his survey won't hold up if investigated by Washington. Montez reveals his plan to kill Don Regas. Jerry wants no part in this and attempts to inform his father, but Montez subdues him before he can leave and later has Akuna hold him hostage. Montez has Akuna hide Jerry's body and asks his half-brother to kill Don Regas. Bill and Gabby soon find out about the Montez's plan and rush off to stop it. Akuna and his men attack Don Regas and his caravan. Killing his drivers and gunners, the carriage overturns and Regas is shot trying to defend himself. Bill and Gabby try to shoot Akuna, but they are out of range.

Bill and Gabby take Don Regas back to town for him to recuperate. Akuna goes to Montez to deliver the news, but when Montez asks for the dead Akuna reveals he did not have time to search for it. They return to the wreckage only to find that Don Regas' body has been moved. Montez sets off to get to the bottom of the situation. Back at the Regas house, Tonia confronts Bill about the attack on her grandfather. They are interrupted by Montez who tries to kill them. Montez flees while Bill and Gabby give chase. Montez, thinking he has lost them, leads Bill and Gabby directly to Akuna's hideout. Bill and Gabby make their way past two guards and into the room where Jerry is being held. Akuna and his men begin firing on the room where the three men are, leaving them trapped. Montez and Akuna lead a ride into town to attack the Regas house, while arrow shooters surround Bill, Gabby and Jerry.

Bill notices an old war bugle in the room and has Gabby play it to scatter the Akuna's remaining men. The plan works and the three escape for town. At the Regas home, the workers are trying to defend the home from Akuna's attack. Meanwhile Colonel Calhoun and his men set out for Akuna's hideout, but Gabby attempts to lead them back to the Regas house. Bill arrives at the Regas before Montez can reach Talia and her grandfather and Bill manages to subdue Montez. Akuna and his men are beaten by Colonel Joseph Calhoun and his men. After the commotion, Jerry comes clean about forging the survey and Tonia reconciles with Bill. The film ends with Bill singing a love song to Tonia.

== Cast ==
- Roy Rogers as Bill Cody
- George "Gabby" Hayes as Gabby Whittaker
- Pauline Moore as Tonia Regas
- Hugh Sothern as Don Regas
- Chief Thundercloud as Akuna
- Julian Rivero as Pancho
- Trevor Bardette as Emelio Montez
- Steve Pendleton as Jerry Calhoun
- Wade Boteler as Colonel Joseph Calhoun
- Anna Demetrio as Elena
- Estelita Zarco as Dolores

== Soundtrack ==
- Roy Rogers and George 'Gabby' Hayes - "Rollin' Down to Santa Fe" (Written by Walter G. Samuels)
- Roy Rogers - "Blow, Breeze, Blow" (Written by Peter Tinturin)
