= Unknown Valley =

1933 film

- Directed by: Lambert Hillyer
- Written by: Lambert Hillyer; Donald W. Lee
- Starring: Buck Jones; Cecilia Parker; Wade Boteler
- Cinematography: Allen G. Siegler
- Edited by: Clarence Kolster
- Production company: Columbia Pictures
- Distributed by: Columbia Pictures
- Release date: May 5, 1933
- Running time: 69 minutes
- Country: United States
- Language: English

Unknown Valley is a 1933 American pre-Code Western film directed by Lambert Hillyer and starring Buck Jones, Cecilia Parker and Wade Boteler. It was shot at the Iverson Ranch in California.

== Cast ==
- Buck Jones as Joe Gordon (as Charles 'Buck' Jones)
- Cecilia Parker as Sheila O'Neill (as Cecelia Parker)
- Wade Boteler as Elder Crossett
- Frank McGlynn Sr. as Head Elder (as Frank McGlynn)
- Ward Bond as Elder Snead
- Arthur Wanzer as Tim
- Alf James as Pop Gordon
- Buck Black as Shad O'Neill (as Bret Black)
- Carlota Warwick as Mary James (as Carlotta Warwick)
- Hank Bell as Townsman
- Charles Brinley as Gong-Ringer
- Buck Bucko as Townsman
- Roy Bucko as Townsman
- Frank Ellis as Townsman
- Jack Evans as Man Pointing Out Gordon
- Clarence Geldert as Army Colonel
- Si Jenks as Man at Bridger's Post
- Jack Kirk as Ezra Turner
- Edward LeSaint as Jim Bridger
- Bud McClure as Townsman
- Lew Meehan as Townsman
- Steve Pendleton as Townsman
- Jessie Proctor as Townswoman
- Lucile Sewall as Townswoman
- Al Taylor as Townsman
- Harry Todd as Zeke
- Dorothy Vernon as Townswoman
- Slim Whitaker as Man at Bridger's Post

== Bibliography ==
- Balio, Tino. Grand Design: Hollywood as a Modern Business Enterprise, 1930-1939. University of California Press, 1995.
- Pitts, Michael R. Western Movies: A Guide to 5,105 Feature Films. McFarland, 2012.
