= Nevada City (film) =

1941 film by Joseph Kane

- Theatrical release poster
- Directed by: Joseph Kane
- Written by: James R. Webb (original screenplay)
- Produced by: Joseph Kane (associate producer)
- Starring: Roy Rogers; George "Gabby" Hayes; Sally Payne
- Cinematography: William Nobles
- Edited by: Lester Orlebeck
- Music by: Cy Feuer
- Production company: Republic Pictures
- Distributed by: Republic Pictures
- Release date: 20 July 1941 (United States)
- Running time: 58 minutes 54 minutes
- Country: United States
- Language: English

Nevada City is a 1941 American Western film directed by Joseph Kane starring Roy Rogers, George "Gabby" Hayes and Sally Payne. It was produced and distributed by Republic Pictures.

== Plot ==
The local stagecoach line that Jeff Connors and Gabby work for are not only facing competition from the railroad, but Black Bart's band of outlaws. The head of the stage line feels the railroad is behind Black Bart's attack but Jeff is not so sure.

== Cast ==
- Roy Rogers as Jeff Connors
- George "Gabby" Hayes as "Gabby" Chapman
- Sally Payne as Jo Morrison
- George Cleveland as Hank Liddell
- Billy Lee as Chick Morrison
- Joseph Crehan as Mark Benton
- Fred Kohler Jr. as Jim Trevor / Black Bart
- Pierre Watkin as Amos Norton
- Jack Ingram as Sheriff Pat Daley

== Bibliography ==
- Fetrow, Alan G. Feature Films, 1940-1949: a United States Filmography. McFarland, 1994.
