= Jesse James at Bay =

1941 film

- Theatrical release poster
- Directed by: Joseph Kane
- Screenplay by: James R. Webb
- Story by: Harrison Jacobs
- Produced by: Joseph Kane
- Starring: Roy Rogers; George "Gabby" Hayes; Sally Payne
- Cinematography: William Nobles
- Edited by: Tony Martinelli
- Music by: Paul Sawtell
- Production company: Republic Pictures
- Distributed by: Republic Pictures
- Release date: October 17, 1941
- Running time: 56 minutes 53 minutes
- Country: United States
- Language: English

Jesse James at Bay is a 1941 American Western film directed by Joseph Kane and starring Roy Rogers, George "Gabby" Hayes and Sally Payne. Roy Rogers plays dual roles in this film. It was produced and distributed by Republic Pictures.

== Plot ==
When Jesse learns that crooked banker Krager is cheating settlers, he and his gang rob trains to obtain cash for them to purchase their land. Krager, finding a Jesse look-alike in Clint Burns, hires him to wreak havoc on the ranchers pretending to be the fearsome outlaw. When Jesse confronts and kills Burns, he switches clothes and goes after the crooked gang.

== Cast ==
- Roy Rogers as Jesse James/Clint Burns
- George 'Gabby' Hayes as Sheriff Gabby Whitaker
- Sally Payne as Polly Morgan
- Pierre Watkin as Phineas Krager – Land Dealer
- Ivan Miller as Judge Rutherford
- Hal Taliaferro as Paul Sloan, Lawyer
- Gale Storm as Jane Fillmore, 'St. Louis Journal' Reporter
- Roy Barcroft as Henchman Vern Stone
- Jack Kirk as Henchman Rufe Balder
- Edward Peil Sr. as Marshal (uncredited)

== Themes ==
Although considered a Western, the film incorporates situations and themes associated with the Great Depression.

== Soundtrack ==
- Roy Rogers – "You for Me" (Written by Sol Meyer)
- Roy Rogers – "The Old Chisholm Trail" (Traditional)
