= The Man from Music Mountain (1943 film) =

1943 film by Joseph Kane

- Directed by: Joseph Kane
- Written by: J. Benton Cheney (writer); Bradford Ropes (writer)
- Produced by: Harry Grey (associate producer)
- Starring: See below
- Cinematography: William Bradford
- Edited by: Tony Martinelli
- Music by: Mort Glickman; Marlin Skiles
- Release date: October 30, 1943
- Running time: 71 minutes (original version); 54 minutes (edited version)
- Country: United States
- Language: English

The Man from Music Mountain is a 1943 American Western musical film directed by Joseph Kane.

The film is also known as Texas Legionnaires.

== Cast ==
- Roy Rogers as himself
- Trigger as Trigger, Roy's Horse
- Bob Nolan as Bob
- Sons of the Pioneers as Musicians
- Ruth Terry as Laramie Winters
- Paul Kelly as Victor Marsh
- Ann Gillis as Penny Winters
- George Cleveland as Sheriff Hal Darcey
- Pat Brady as Pat Brady, Sons of the Pioneers
- Renie Riano as Christina - Housekeeper
- Paul Harvey as Davis
- Hank Bell as Adobe Joe Wallace
- Jay Novello as Henchman Barker
- Hal Taliaferro as Henchman Slade

== Soundtrack ==
- Roy Rogers, the Sons of the Pioneers and cast - "Smiles Are Made Out of the Sunshine" (Written by Ray Gilbert and Morton Scott)
- Performed by Roy Rogers and reprised by Pat Brady - "I'm Beginning to Care" (Written by Gene Autry and Fred Rose)
- Performed by the Sons of the Pioneers - "Song of the Bandit" (Written by Bob Nolan)
