= George "Gabby" Hayes =

American actor (1885–1969)

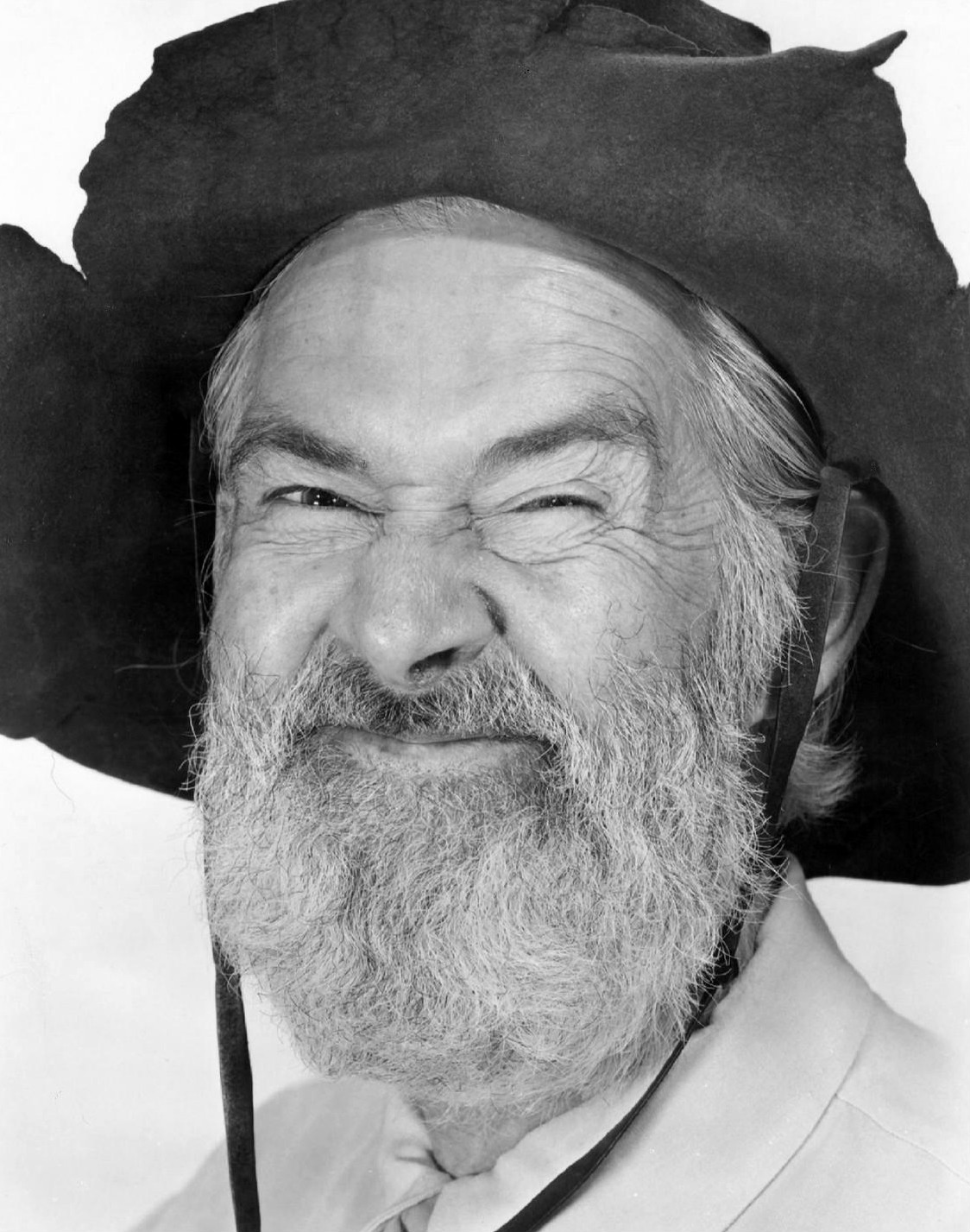
- Hayes in 1952
- Born: George Francis Hayes; May 7, 1885; Stannards, New York, U.S.
- Died: February 9, 1969 (aged 83); Burbank, California, U.S.
- Resting place: Forest Lawn Memorial Park, Hollywood Hills, California
- Occupation: Actor
- Years active: 1902–1956
- Spouse: Olive E. Ireland (m. 1914; died 1957)

George Francis "Gabby" Hayes (May 7, 1885 – February 9, 1969) was an American actor. He began as something of a leading man and a character player, but he was best known for his numerous appearances in B-Western film series as the bewhiskered, cantankerous, but ever-loyal and brave comic sidekick of the cowboy stars William Boyd, Roy Rogers and John Wayne.

== Early years ==
Hayes was born the third of seven children in his father's hotel, the Hayes Hotel, in Stannards, New York. (Hayes always gave Wellsville as his birthplace, but legally he was born in Stannards.) He was the son of Elizabeth Morrison and Clark Hayes. In addition to operating the hotel, his father was also involved in petroleum production, an industry which began in that part of the country. His siblings included his brothers, William W., Morrison, and Clark B., and his sisters, Nellie Elizabeth Hayes Ebeling and Harriet "Hattie" Elizabeth Hayes Allen. Morrison Hayes, a corporal in the United States Army, was killed in action on July 19, 1918, during World War I in France and was awarded the Distinguished Service Cross for his actions during the war. The American Legion post in Wellsville, New York is named after him. George's uncle on his mother's side was George F. Morrison, vice president of General Electric.

Hayes grew up in Stannards and attended Stannards School. He played semi-professional baseball while in high school. At 17 he ran away from home, joined a stock company, apparently traveled for a time with a circus, and became a successful vaudevillian. He often appeared in comic sketches as "The Rube Constable."

Hayes married Olive E. Ireland, the daughter of a glass finisher, on March 4, 1914. She joined him in vaudeville, performing under the name Dorothy Earle (not to be confused with film actress and writer Dorothy Earle). Hayes had become so successful that by 1928, at age 43, he was able to retire to a home on Long Island in Baldwin, New York. He lost all his savings the next year in the 1929 stock market crash. Olive persuaded her husband to try his luck in films, and the couple moved to Los Angeles. They remained together until her death on July 5, 1957. They had no children.

== Film career ==
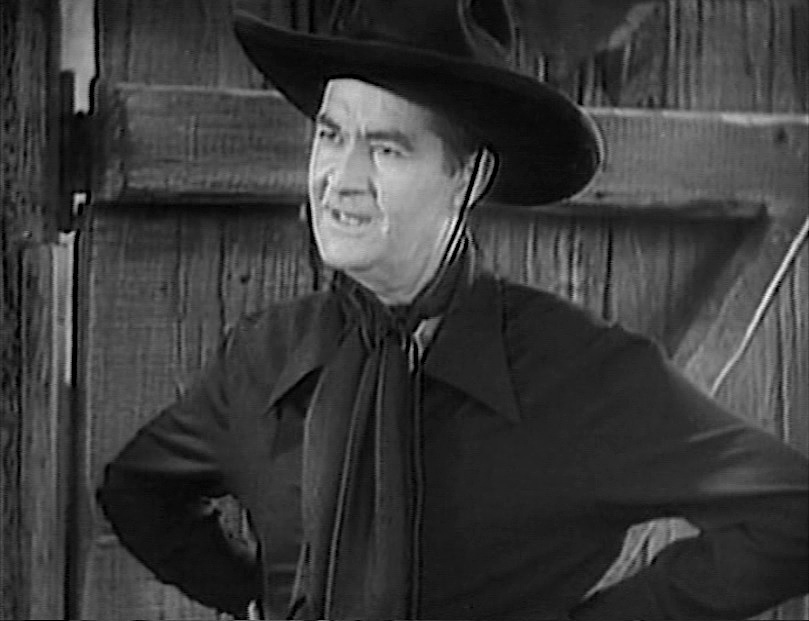
George Hayes, without his facial hair, as the villain Matt the Mute in Randy Rides Alone, 1934

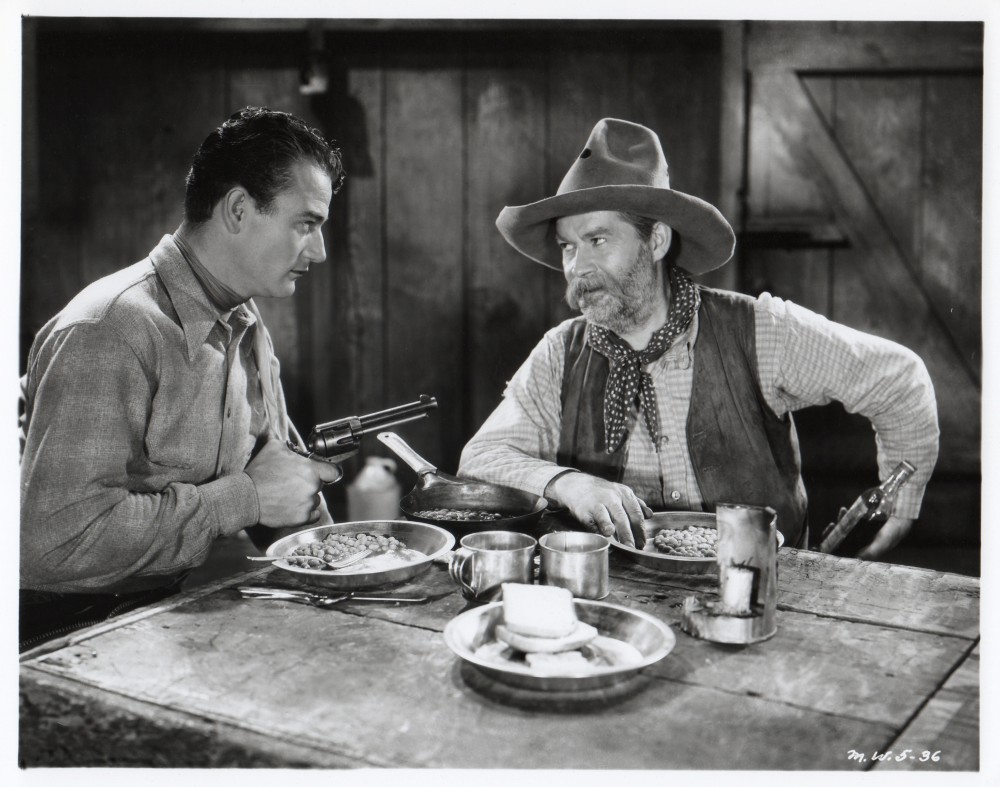
With John Wayne in Blue Steel (1934)

After his move to Los Angeles, according to later interviews, Hayes had a chance meeting with the producer Trem Carr, who liked his look and gave him 30 roles over the next six years. In his early career, Hayes was cast in a variety of parts, including villains, and occasionally played two roles in a single film. He found a niche in the growing genre of Western films, many of which were series with recurring characters. Hayes did not come from a cowboy background; he did not know how to ride a horse until he was in his 40s.

Hayes, in real life an intelligent, well-groomed and articulate man, often was cast as a grizzled codger who uttered phrases such as "consarn it", "yer durn tootin'", "dadgummit", "durn persnickety female", and "young whippersnapper". From 1935 to 1939, Hayes played the part of Windy Halliday, the humorous "codger" sidekick of Hopalong Cassidy (played by William Boyd). In 1939, Hayes left this role at Paramount Pictures after a dispute over his salary and moved to Republic Pictures. Paramount held the rights to the name Windy Halliday, and Republic renamed him Gabby Whitaker, which was virtually the same character. As Gabby, he appeared in more than 40 films from 1939 to 1946, usually with Roy Rogers (44 times) and with Gene Autry (7) and Wild Bill Elliott (14), often working under the directorship of Joseph Kane (34). Hayes repeatedly was cast as a sidekick of the Western stars Randolph Scott (6 times) and John Wayne (15 times, some as straight or villainous characters). Hayes played Wayne's sidekick in Raoul Walsh's Dark Command (1940), which featured Roy Rogers in a supporting role.

Hayes became a popular performer and consistently ranked among the 10 favorite actors in polls taken of moviegoers of the period. He appeared in either one or both the Motion Picture Herald and Boxoffice Magazine lists of the Top Ten Moneymaking Western Stars for 12 consecutive years and then a thirteenth time in 1954, four years after his last film.

Westerns declined in popularity in the late 1940s, and Hayes made his last film in the genre in 1950: The Cariboo Trail. He had appeared in 174 westerns. He moved to television and hosted The Gabby Hayes Show, a Western series, from 1950 to 1954 on NBC and in a version in 1956 on ABC. The show was sponsored by Quaker Oats, and its products were advertised during the show. In promoting the product, Gabby said to stand back from the screen, and he fired a cannon loaded with cereal at the screen as a tie-in to their ad slogan, "shot from guns". He introduced the show, often while whittling on a piece of wood, and sometimes told a tall tale. When the series ended, Hayes retired from show business. During this time, he made guest appearances on television, including several on Howdy Doody for his friend "Buffalo" Bob Smith. He lent his name to "Gabby Hayes Western" comics, published by Fawcett Publications from November 1948 until January 1957, and to a children's summer camp in New York.

== Death ==
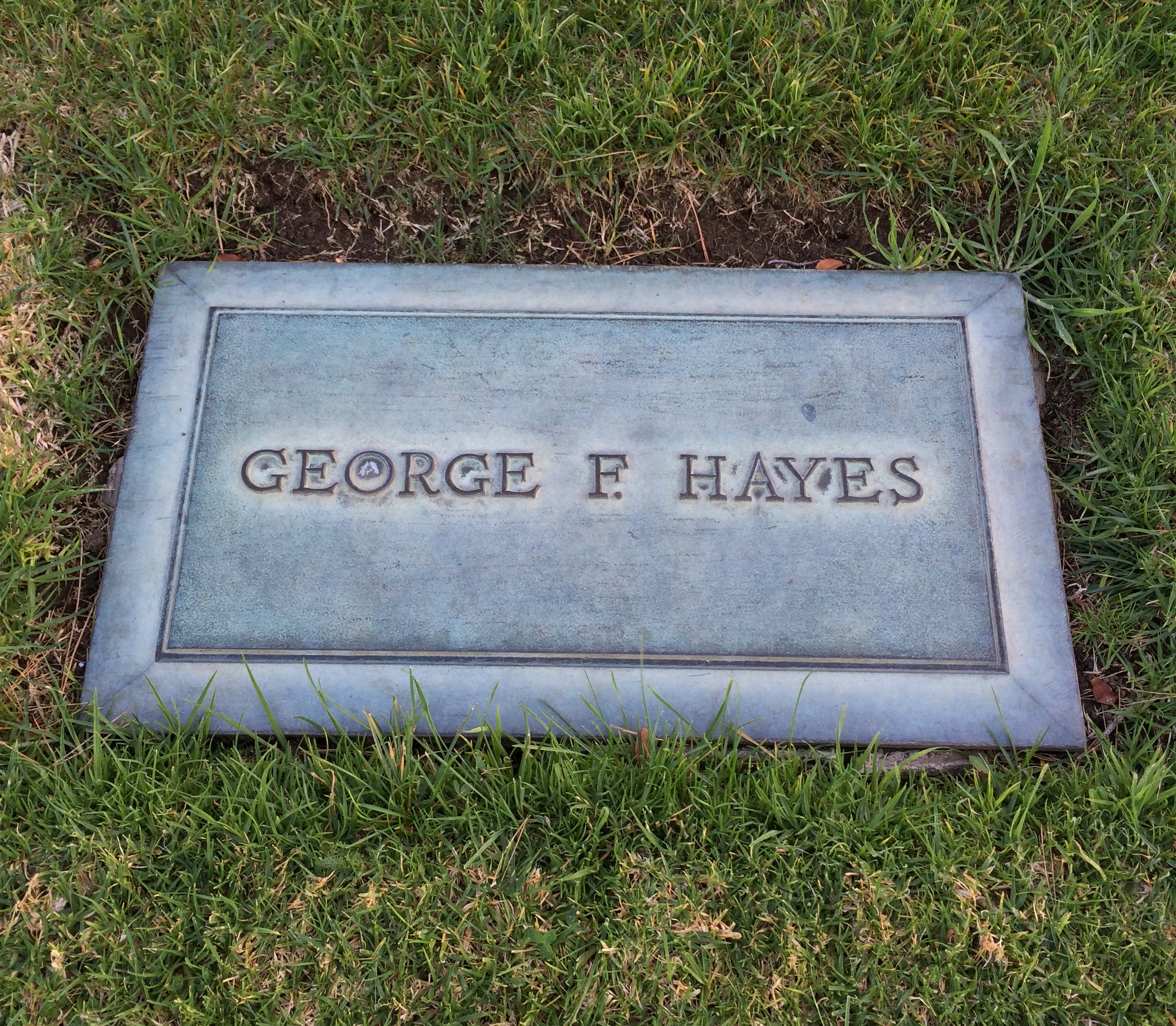
Hayes's grave at Forest Lawn Hollywood Hills

Following his wife's death on July 5, 1957, Hayes first lived at his ranch on Toluca Lake in California. He later stayed at a 10-unit apartment building he owned.

Early in 1969 he entered Saint Joseph Hospital in Burbank, California, for treatment of cardiovascular disease. Hayes died there on February 9, 1969, at the age of 83. He is interred in the Forest Lawn–Hollywood Hills Cemetery.

== Honors ==
Two stars on the Hollywood Walk of Fame commemorate Hayes's work in the entertainment industry: one for his contribution to radio at 6427 Hollywood Boulevard and one for his contribution to television at 1724 Vine Street. In 2000, he was posthumously inducted into the Hall of Great Western Performers at the National Cowboy and Western Heritage Museum in Oklahoma City, Oklahoma.

== Popular culture ==
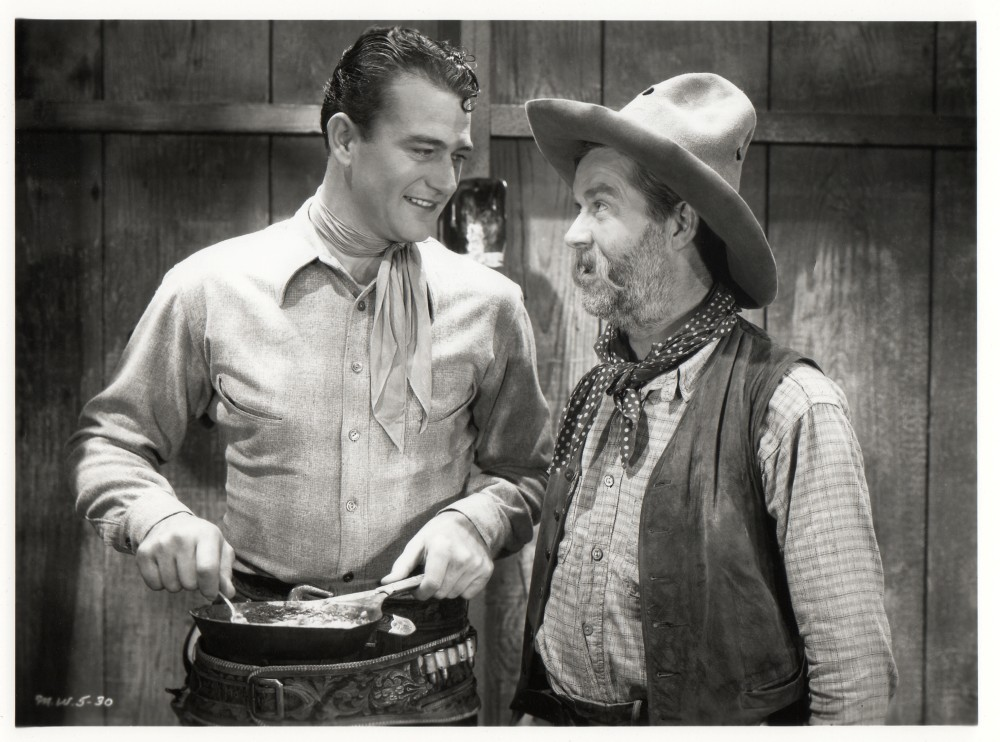
John Wayne and Gabby Hayes

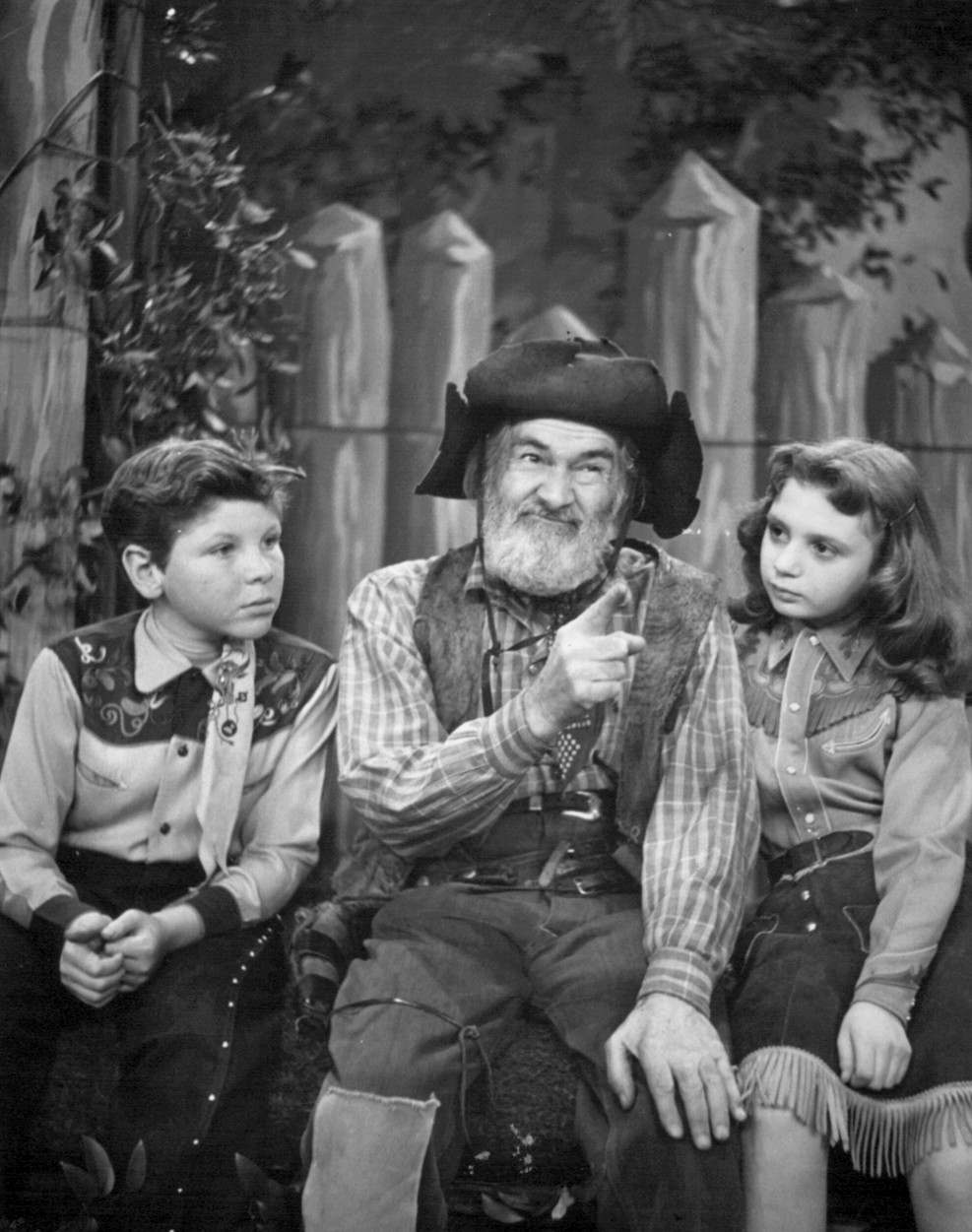
The Gabby Hayes Show (1951)

Homage was paid to Hayes in a different way in the 1974 satirical Western Blazing Saddles. The actor and director Jack Starrett, credited as Claude Ennis Starrett Jr., played a Hayes-like character. In keeping with a running joke in the movie, the character is called Gabby Johnson. After Johnson delivers a rousing, though partially unintelligible speech to the townspeople, David Huddleston's character stands up to say, "Now, who can argue with that?!", and proclaims it "authentic frontier gibberish".

In the animated film Toy Story 2, the character Stinky Pete the Prospector, voiced by Kelsey Grammer, is modeled after Hayes. In the film's fictional universe, he is a toy version of a character on the marionette television western Woody's Roundup, where he is a colorful comic relief character. In contrast, the toy is intelligent and well-spoken, a reference to Hayes's contrasting real-life and film personas.

Into a Mighty Carson Art Players sketch on The Tonight Show, Johnny Carson impersonated Gabby Hayes in a sketch with Roy Rogers. This sketch has appeared on Carson's syndicated series Carson's Comedy Classics, which features highlights from his years as host of The Tonight Show.

Every year in early July, from 1983 through 1989, Gabby Hayes Days were celebrated in Wellsville, New York. The event featured a street sale, square dancing, and Hayes look-alike contests for adults and children. This celebration was eventually merged in the mid-July Wellsville Balloon Rally and gradually disappeared. A street is also named after him in Wellsville, Gabby Hayes Lane.

Since April 1969, a band of fishermen has traveled to Kettle Creek, Pennsylvania] for the Gabby Hayes Memorial Trout Fishing Tournament. These men, known as Gabby Guys, gather annually to celebrate the opening day of the trout fishing season and the memory of Hayes. In April 2019, they celebrated their fiftieth anniversary, which also marked 50 years since Hayes' passing.

== Partial filmography ==
- The Rainbow Man (1929) as Bill (debut)
- Big News (1929) as Hoffman - Reporter
- Smiling Irish Eyes (1929) as Taxi Driver
- Top Speed (1930) as Western Union Clerk (uncredited)
- For the Defense (1930) as Ben - Waiter (uncredited)
- Playing Around (1930) as Railroad Ticket Seller (uncredited)
- She Who Gets Slapped (1930) as Poker Player (uncredited), short film
- Cavalier of the West (1931) as Sheriff Bill Ryan
- Freighters of Destiny (1931) as Jim
- Oklahoma Jim (1931) as Crooked Gambler (uncredited)
- The Nevada Buckaroo (1931) as Cherokee Williams
- Pleasure (1931) as Motorcycle Cop
- Big Business Girl (1931) as Hotel Clerk (uncredited)
- God's Country and the Man (1931) as Stingaree Kelly
- Dirigible (1931) as Parade Official (uncredited)
- The Stolen Jools (1931) as Projectionist (as George Hayes)
- Dragnet Patrol (1931) as Private Detective
- Play Girl (1932) as Dance Hall Tobacconist (uncredited)
- Love Me Tonight (1932) as Grocer (uncredited)
- Winner Take All (1932) as Intern at Rosario Ranch
- Ghost Valley (1932) as Dave (uncredited)
- The Man from Hell's Edges (1932) as Shamrock Cassidy
- The Boiling Point (1932) as George Duncan
- Riders of the Desert (1932) as Hashknife Brooks
- Border Devils (1932) as Dude Sanders
- Wild Horse Mesa (1932) as Slack
- Sally of the Subway (1932) as Police Lieutenant Paxton (uncredited)
- Texas Buddies (1932) as Si Haller
- Hidden Valley (1932) as Henchman Gavin - Black Hat
- Broadway to Cheyenne (1932) as Walrus
- Klondike (1932) as Tom Ross
- The Night Rider (1932) as Altoonie
- The Fighting Champ (1932) as Pete
- Crashin' Broadway (1932) as J. Talbot Thorndyke
- Self Defense (1932) as Jury Foreman
- Ship of Wanted Men (1933) as Crewman
- Ranger's Code (1933) as Baxter
- Skyway (1933) as George Taylor
- Galloping Romeo (1933) as Grizzly
- The Fugitive (1933) as Judge Taylor
- Fighting Texans (1933) as Pop Martin
- The Sphinx (1933) as Det. Casey
- Breed of the Border (1933) as Chuck Wiggins
- Devil's Mate (1933) as Collins
- Riders of Destiny (1933) as Charlie Denton (The first of a series of John Wayne Lone Star Westerns)
- The Gallant Fool (1933) as Dad Denton
- The Return of Casey Jones (1933) as Timothy Shine
- Trailing North (1933) as Flash Ryan
- The Phantom Broadcast (1933) as Police Lieutenant
- The Brand of Hate (1934) as Bill Larkins
- Monte Carlo Nights (1934) as Inspector Nick Gunby
- The Lucky Texan (1934) as Jake Benson
- West of the Divide (1934) as Dusty
- Blue Steel (1934) as Sheriff Jake Withers
- Randy Rides Alone (1934) as Marvin Black aka Matt the Mute
- The Star Packer (1934) as Matt Matlock
- The Lawless Frontier (1934) as Dusty
- The Man from Utah (1934) as Marshal George Higgins
- 'Neath the Arizona Skies (1934) as Matt Downing (uncredited)
- In Old Santa Fe (1934) as Cactus (Gene Autry's screen debut)
- The Man from Hell (1934) as Col. Campbell - Banker
- City Limits (1934) as Charlie Carter
- House of Mystery (1934) as David Fells
- The Lost Jungle (1934) as Doctor - Dirigible Passenger
- Mystery Liner (1934) as Joe, the Watchman
- Beggars in Ermine (1934) as Joe Wilson
- The Lost City (1935) as Butterfield
- Texas Terror (1935) as Sheriff Ed Williams
- Rainbow Valley (1935) as George Hole
- Smokey Smith (1935) as Blaze Bart
- Tombstone Terror (1935) as Soupy Baxter
- The Headline Woman (1935) as Police Desk Sgt. Duffy
- Hitch Hike Lady (1935) as Miner
- Swifty (1935) as Sheriff Dan Hughes
- Bar 20 Rides Again (1935) as Windy
- The Eagle's Brood (1935) as Bartender Spike
- 1000 Dollars a Minute (1935) as "New Deal" Watson
- The Throwback (1935) as Ford Cruze
- Thunder Mountain (1935) as Foley
- Tumbling Tumbleweeds (1935) as Dr. Parker
- Welcome Home (1935) as Charles Rogers (uncredited)
- The Farmer Takes a Wife (1935) as Lucas (uncredited)
- Hop-Along Cassidy (1935) as Uncle Ben
- Honeymoon Limited (1935) as Jasper Pinkham
- Ladies Crave Excitement (1935) as Dan McCloskey
- Justice of the Range (1935) as John Coffin known as Pegleg Sanderson
- The Hoosier Schoolmaster (1935) as Pearson
- The Outlaw Tamer (1935) as Cactus Barnes
- Death Flies East (1935) as Wotkyns
- The Lawless Nineties (1936) as Major Carter
- Mr. Deeds Goes to Town (1936) as Farmer's Spokesman (uncredited)
- The Texas Rangers (1936) as Judge Snow
- Valiant Is the Word for Carrie (1936) as Bearded Man
- Hopalong Cassidy Returns (1936) as Windy Halliday
- The Plainsman (1936) as Breezy
- Trail Dust (1936) as Windy
- Hearts in Bondage (1936) as Ezra
- I Married a Doctor (1936) as Train Station Agent
- Three on the Trail (1936) as Windy Halliday
- Song of the Trail (1936) as Dan Hobson
- Call of the Prairie (1936) as Shanghai
- Heart of the West (1936) as Windy
- Silver Spurs (1936) as Drag Harlan
- Valley of the Lawless (1936) as Grandpaw Jenkins
- Borderland (1937) as Windy Halliday
- Rustlers' Valley (1937) as Windy Halliday
- Texas Trail (1937) as Windy Halliday
- North of the Rio Grande (1937) as Windy Halliday
- Mountain Music (1937) as Grandpappy Burnside
- Hills of Old Wyoming (1937) as Windy Halliday
- Hopalong Rides Again (1937) as Windy Halliday
- Heart of Arizona (1938) as Windy Halliday
- Bar 20 Justice (1938) as Windy Halliday
- In Old Mexico (1938) as Windy Halliday
- Pride of the West (1938) as Windy Halliday
- The Frontiersmen (1938) as Windy Halliday
- Sunset Trail (1938) as Windy Halliday
- Gold Is Where You Find It (1938) as Enoch
- Silver on the Sage (1939) as Windy Halliday
- Renegade Trail (1939) as Windy Halliday
- Days of Jesse James (1939) as Gabby Whittaker
- Let Freedom Ring (1939) as 'Pop" Wilkie
- Saga of Death Valley (1939) as Gabby Whittaker
- The Arizona Kid (1939) as Gabby Whittaker
- In Old Monterey (1939) as Gabby Whittaker
- Wall Street Cowboy (1939) as Gabby Whittaker
- In Old Caliente (1939) as Gabby Whittaker
- Man of Conquest (1939) as Lannie Upchurch
- Southward Ho (1939) as Gabby Whittaker
- Fighting Thoroughbreds (1939) as 'Gramps' Montrose
- Dark Command (1940) as Doc Grunch
- Wagons Westward (1940) as Hardtack
- The Carson City Kid (1940) as Marshal Gabby Whittaker
- The Border Legion (1940) as Honest John Whittaker
- Melody Ranch (1940) as Pop Laramie
- Young Bill Hickok (1940) as Gabby Whittaker
- Colorado (1940) as Gabby
- The Ranger and the Lady (1940) as Texas Ranger Sergeant Gabby Whittaker
- Young Buffalo Bill (1940) as Gabby Whittaker
- Robin Hood of the Pecos (1941) as Gabriel "Gabby" Hornaday
- Sheriff of Tombstone (1941) as Judge Gabby Whittaker
- Red River Valley (1941) as Gabby Whittaker
- Jesse James at Bay (1941) as Sheriff Gabby Whittaker
- Bad Man of Deadwood (1941) as Professor Mortimer 'Gabby' Blackstone
- Nevada City (1941) as Gabby Chapman
- In Old Cheyenne (1941) as Arapahoe Brown
- Man from Cheyenne (1942) as Gabby Whittaker
- Romance on the Range (1942) as Gabby
- Sons of the Pioneers (1942) as Gabby Whittaker
- Ridin' Down the Canyon (1942) as Gabby
- Heart of the Golden West (1942) as Gabby
- Sunset Serenade (1942) as Gabby
- Sunset on the Desert (1942) as Gabby Whittaker
- South of Santa Fe (1942) as Gabby Whittaker
- Calling Wild Bill Elliott (1943) as Gabby Whittaker
- In Old Oklahoma (1943) as Despirit Dean
- Death Valley Manhunt (1943) as Gabby Hayes
- Overland Mail Robbery (1943) as Gabby
- Wagon Tracks West (1943) as Gabby
- Bordertown Gun Fighters (1943) as Gabby Hayes
- The Man from Thunder River (1943) as Gabby Whittaker
- Mojave Firebrand (1944) as Gabby Hayes
- Hidden Valley Outlaws (1944) as Gabby Hayes
- Tall in the Saddle (1944) as Dave
- The Big Bonanza (1944) as Hap Selby
- Tucson Raiders (1944) as Gabby Hopkins
- Lights of Old Santa Fe as Gabby Whittaker
- Marshal of Reno (1944) as Gabby
- Sunset in El Dorado (1945) as Gabby
- The Man from Oklahoma (1945) as Gabby Whittaker
- Bells of Rosarita (1945) as Gabby Whittaker
- Utah (1945) as Gabby Whittaker
- Don't Fence Me In (1945) as Gabby Whittaker aka Wildcat Kelly
- Along the Navajo Trail (1945) as Gabby Whittaker
- My Pal Trigger (1946) as Gabby Kendrick
- Heldorado (1946) as Gabby
- Home in Oklahoma (1946) as Gabby Whittaker
- Roll on Texas Moon (1946) as Gabby Whittaker
- Under Nevada Skies (1946) as Gabby Whittaker
- Rainbow Over Texas (1946) as Sheriff Gabby Whittaker
- Badman's Territory (1946) as Coyote
- Song of Arizona (1946) as Coyote
- Wyoming (1947) as Windy Gibson
- Trail Street (1947) as Billy
- Albuquerque (1948) as Juke
- Return of the Bad Men (1948) as John Petit
- The Untamed Breed (1948) as Windy Lucas
- El Paso (1949) as Pasky (Pescaloosa) Tees
- The Cariboo Trail (1950) as Oscar aka Grizzly

== Comic book appearances ==
- Gabby Hayes Adventure Comics #1 (1953, Toby Press)
- Gabby Hayes Western #1–59 (1948–1957, Fawcett Publications)
- Gabby Hayes Western #50–111 (1951–1955, L. Miller black-and-white reprints of Fawcett Comics)
- Gabby Hayes Mini Comics, 5 issues (1951, Quaker Oats giveaway)
