= Romance on the Range (film) =

1942 film

- Theatrical release poster
- Directed by: Joseph Kane
- Screenplay by: J. Benton Cheney
- Produced by: Joseph Kane
- Starring: Roy Rogers; George "Gabby" Hayes; Sally Payne; Linda Hayes; Sons of the Pioneers
- Cinematography: William Nobles
- Edited by: Lester Orlebeck
- Music by: Cy Feuer
- Distributed by: Republic Pictures
- Release date: May 18, 1942 (USA)
- Running time: 63 minutes
- Country: United States
- Language: English

Romance on the Range is a 1942 American Western film directed by Joseph Kane and starring Roy Rogers, George "Gabby" Hayes, Sally Payne, Linda Hayes, and Sons of the Pioneers.

== Cast ==
- Roy Rogers as Roy Rogers
- George "Gabby" Hayes as Gabby
- Sally Payne as Sally
- Linda Hayes as Joan Stuart
- Edward Pawley as Jerome Banning
- Harry Woods as Henchman Steve
- Hal Taliaferro as Sheriff Wilson
- Glenn Strange as Stokes, Henchman
- Roy Barcroft as Pete, Henchman
- Sons of the Pioneers as Musicians, cowhands
