= Tumbling Tumbleweeds (film) =

1935 film by Joseph Kane, Nat Levine

- Theatrical release poster
- Directed by: Joseph Kane
- Screenplay by: Ford Beebe
- Story by: Alan Ludwig
- Produced by: Nat Levine
- Starring: Gene Autry; Smiley Burnette; Lucile Browne
- Cinematography: Ernest Miller; William Bradford
- Edited by: Lester Orlebeck
- Production company: Republic Pictures
- Distributed by: Republic Pictures
- Release date: September 5, 1935 (U.S.)
- Running time: 61 minutes
- Country: United States
- Language: English
- Budget: $15,344

Tumbling Tumbleweeds is a 1935 American Western film directed by Joseph Kane and starring Gene Autry, Smiley Burnette, and Lucile Browne. Written by Ford Beebe, the film is about a cowboy who returns home after a five-year absence to find his father murdered and his boyhood pal accused of the dastardly deed. Tumbling Tumbleweeds features the songs "Riding Down the Canyon", "That Silver-Haired Daddy of Mine", and the Bob Nolan classic "Tumbling Tumbleweeds".

== Plot ==
Gene Autry (Gene Autry) returns to his home after a five-year absence as a singing cowboy with a group of strolling players that includes Smiley (Smiley Burnette) and Eightball (Eugene Jackson), who sell Dr. Parker's Painless Panacea. Gene's father, a cattle baron and one of the original "nesters" in the West, was recently murdered during a conflict with his landlord.

While at an abandoned nester's cabin, the group is held up by Harry Brooks (Cornelius Keefe), whom Gene recognizes as his old friend. Wounded and semi-delirious, Harry induces Gene to hide him from the posse headed by Sheriff Manley (George Burton). The deputy later returns and tries to shoot Harry, but Gene chases him away.

In town, the deputy reports to Barney Craven (Edward Hearn), leader of a gang which is trying to silence Harry. Meanwhile, Gene and his friends set up a performance in town, but it is interrupted by Craven's men, who report that Harry is wanted for the murder of Gene's father. Hastening to Harry's home, Gene confronts his former sweetheart Janet, now Harry's wife, and meets Janet's younger sister Jerry (Lucile Browne), whom he had only known as a girl. They assure Gene of Harry's innocence and reveal that Harry and Gene's father were about to sign a settlement over disputed water rights.

Now suspicious of Craven, Gene captures Craven, the deputy, and their cohorts by a series of clever ruses that land them in jail, and thereby vindicates Harry. Gene and Jerry marry and join Smiley and Eightball on the departing Parker wagon.

== Cast ==
- Gene Autry as Gene Autry
- Smiley Burnette as Smiley
- Lucile Browne as Jerry
- George "Gabby" Hayes as Dr. Parker
- Norma Tayloras Janet Brooks
- Edward Hearn as Barney Craven
- Eugene Jackson as Eightball
- Jack Rockwell as McWade
- George Chesebro as Henchman Connors
- Frankie Marvin as Shorty
- Cornelius Keefe as Harry Brooks (uncredited)
- George Burton as Sheriff Manley (uncredited)
- Bob Card as Deputy (uncredited)
- Champion as Gene's Horse (uncredited)

== Production ==
=== Filming and budget ===
Tumbling Tumbleweeds was filmed July 6–12, 1935. The film had an operating budget of $15,344 (equal to $360,323 today), and a negative cost of $18,801.

=== Filming locations ===
- Bakersfield, California, USA
- Barstow, California, USA
- Monogram Ranch, 24715 Oak Creek Avenue, Newhall, California, USA
- Victorville, California, USA

=== Stuntwork ===
Having learned the art of screen fighting from Yakima Canutt, Gene Autry handled all of the fight scenes himself. Ken Cooper doubled for Autry during the dangerous riding sequences.

- Tommy Coats
- Ken Cooper (Gene Autry's stunt double)
- Cliff Lyons

=== Soundtrack ===
- "I'll Yodel My Troubles Away" (Gene Autry, Smiley Burnette) by Gene Autry
- "Cowboy Medicine Show" (Smiley Burnette) by Gene Autry and the Medicine Show troupe
- "Corn-fed and Rusty" (Smiley Burnette) by Smiley Burnette (vocals and accordion)
- "Riding Down the Canyon" (Gene Autry, Smiley Burnette) by Gene Autry
- "That Silver Haired Daddy of Mine" (Gene Autry, Jimmy Long) by Gene Autry
- "Tumbling Tumbleweeds" (Bob Nolan) by Gene Autry
- "Oh! Susanna" (Stephen Foster) by the Medicine Show troupe

== Reception ==
In his review of the DVD release of the film for DVD Talk, Stuart Galbraith IV wrote:

Gene Autry's first Western for Republic Pictures—indeed, it's regarded as the very first "singing cowboy" Western ever—is one of his best, a very entertaining programmer that crams a lot of entertainment into its short-and-to-the-point 58 minutes. It's more a Western with music than a typical Gene Autry Western; although the basic components for the dozens of musical Westerns Autry would subsequently make for the studio are on display, it's pleasingly rough around the edges, without the formula blandness that would quickly permeate his films.
