= The Lawless Nineties =

1936 film

- Film poster
- Directed by: Joseph Kane
- Written by: Scott Pembroke; Joseph F. Poland
- Produced by: Trem Carr
- Starring: John Wayne
- Cinematography: William Nobles
- Edited by: Joseph Kane
- Music by: Arthur Kay
- Distributed by: Republic Pictures
- Release date: February 15, 1936
- Running time: 55 minutes
- Country: United States
- Language: English

The Lawless Nineties is a 1936 American Western film directed by Joseph Kane and starring John Wayne and Lane Chandler as federal agents in Wyoming. The film also stars 19-year-old Ann Rutherford and Gabby Hayes.

The film's copyright was renewed in 1963.

== Plot ==
In the 1890s, outlaws in the Wyoming Territory are trying to prevent a vote for statehood. Undercover federal agents John Tipton and Bridger head for Crocket City, which is a source of much of the criminal activity. Tipton encounters Major Carter, his daughter Janet, and their servant Moses, who have fallen behind their wagon train of settlers on the way to Crocket City. Carter has recently bought the local newspaper, the Crocket City Blade, which he will run with help from Janet. Tipton arrives just in time to scare off some outlaws, led by Steele, who were harassing the Carters after attacking the wagon train, shooting Steele when he tries to draw on Tipton.

At a rally Carter announces he plans to use the power of the press to fight lawlessness and aid the statehood cause. Local businessman Charles Plummer warns Carter that making to much noise could be dangerous, as that is what led to the previous editor of the newspaper getting killed.

When Bridger sends a coded message to the government requesting more help, Plummer and two associates listen in on a secret telegraph line. Surmising that a coded message would only be sent by a government agent, they watch the telegraph office, and when Bridger leaves, Plummer sends two men to follow and then kill him. In the meantime, Steele sees him in town and tells Plummer who says to beat him up, but not to shoot him in town. Two outlaws attack Tipton but he defeats them. Soon after some townsfolk arrive in town with Bridger, who has been shot in the back. No-one can identify him and Tipton pretends not to either.

Carter prints posters pushing for statehood. A drunk rips down the poster outside the newspaper office, then starts a fight with one of the townsmen. The drunk shoots Carter when he tries to stop the fight, but is let off the murder charge when it is ruled accidental. Tipton tells Janet the trial was a farce.

Plummer learns about a shipment of silver through his secret telegraph, and sends some men to rob it. When they hold up the shipment's escort they are caught by Tipton, who has arranged for a fake message to trap them, and his men.Steele, who has been watching from the trees, rides back to tell Plummer. Plmmer says the rest of the outlaws should shoot up the town. During the shooting spree, Tipton is caught by two outlaws who knock him out and tie him up, leaving him in Plummer's office. Tipton hears Plummer listening in on his telegraph and planning to disrupt voting in every town in Wyoming. When Plummer and Steele leave, Tipton escapes and warns his men to return to their towns and stop the outlaws.

On the day of the election, the homesteaders are prevented from voting by the outlaws. In Crocket City, they prevent Janet, and Moses, from printing the newspaper, and barricade the town. Tipton leads in a bunch of agents and ranchers to crush the outlaws. They are stopped by the barricade and a big shootout takes place. One of the townsfolk destroys the barricade with dynamite letting Tipton and his men in and they capture most of the surviving outlaws. Plummer takes his money from the safe, intending to flee. Steele says they can fight their way out, but Plummer shoots him. Tipton arrives, breaks into Plummer's office, finds Steele's body and then sees him trying to escape on his horse. Out of bullets he jumps Plummer, eventually knocking him out, with the sheriff then arriving to arrest Plummer.

Wyoming votes for statehood and Tipton and Janet celebrate together.

== Cast ==
- John Wayne as John Tipton
- Ann Rutherford as Janet Carter
- Harry Woods as Charles K. Plummer
- George Hayes as Maj. Carter
- Al Bridge as Steele
- Fred Toones as Moses (billed as "Snowflake")
- Etta McDaniel as Mandy Lou Schaefer
- Tom Brower as Marshal Bowen
- Lane Chandler as Bridger
- Cliff Lyons as Davis
- Jack Rockwell as Smith
- Al Taylor as Henchman Red
- Charles King as Henchman Hartley
- George Chesebro as Henchman Green
- Tracy Lane as Belden

== See also ==
- John Wayne filmography
