= The Headline Woman =

1935 film by William Nigh

- Directed by: William Nigh
- Written by: Jack Natteford (story and screenplay) and Claire Church (story and screenplay)
- Produced by: Nat Levine (producer); Victor Zobel (supervising producer)
- Starring: Heather Angel; Ford Sterling
- Cinematography: Ernest Miller; William Nobles
- Edited by: Joseph Kane
- Production company: Mascot Pictures
- Distributed by: Republic Pictures
- Release date: May 15, 1935 (United States)
- Running time: 76 minutes
- Country: United States
- Language: English

The Headline Woman is a 1935 American crime film directed by William Nigh and starring Heather Angel and Ford Sterling. Produced by Mascot Pictures it was distributed by the newly-formed Republic Pictures. The film was also known by the alternative title of The Woman in the Case in the United Kingdom.

== Plot ==
The daughter of a newspaper owner is sought for murder by the police. One of the reporters on the newspaper goes into hiding with her hoping to get a scoop.

== Cast ==
- Heather Angel as Myrna Van Buren
- Roger Pryor as Bob Grayson
- Ford Sterling as Hugo Meyer
- Conway Tearle as Police Commissioner Frank Desmond
- Robert Gleckler as Harry Chase
- Russell Hopton as Craig, Reporter
- Jack La Rue as Phil Zarias
- Theodore von Eltz as Johnny "Full House" Corinti
- Morgan Wallace as Clarkey
- Franklin Pangborn as Hamilton, Reporter
- Ward Bond as Johnson, Reporter
- Wade Boteler as Police Lt. Flanagan
- Syd Saylor as Murphy, Reporter
- George J. Lewis as O'Shay, Reporter
- George "Gabby" Hayes as Police Desk Sgt. Duffy
- Wheeler Oakman as Panther Fielding
- Lillian Miles as Trini
- Warner Richmond as Henchman Bradley
- Harry Bowen as Ernie, News Photographer
