= Man from Cheyenne =

1942 film directed by Joseph Kane

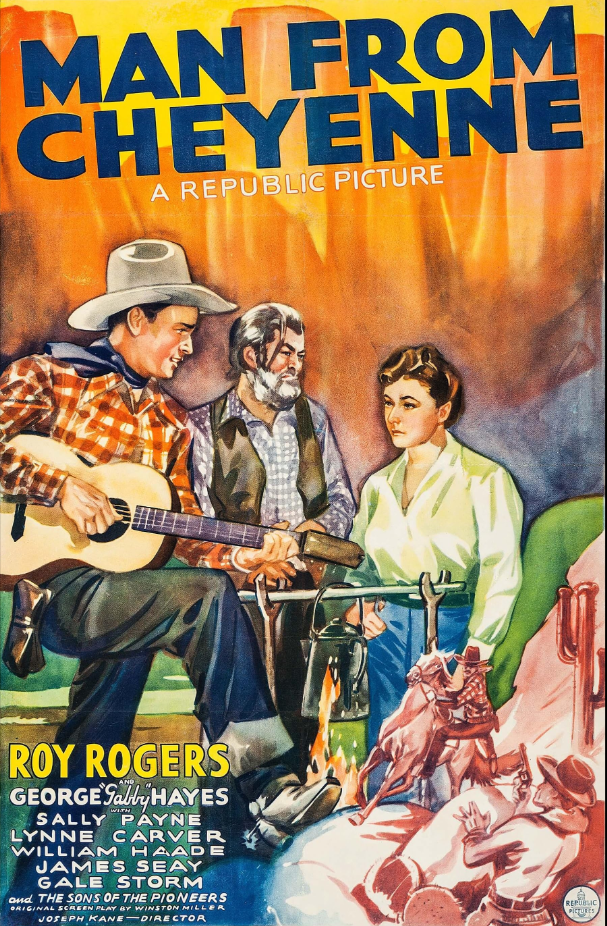
- Man from Cheyenne (1942) - Original poster
- Directed by: Joseph Kane rthur Siteman
- Written by: Winston Miller
- Produced by: Republic Pictures
- Starring: Roy Rogers; George "Gabby" Hayes; Sally Payne; Lynne Carver
- Narrated by: Reed Hadley
- Cinematography: Reggie Lanning
- Edited by: Tony Martinelli
- Music by: Mort Glickman; Cy Feuer
- Distributed by: Republic Pictures
- Release date: January 4, 1942; (in U.S.A.)
- Running time: 61 minutes
- Country: United States
- Language: English
- Budget: estimated $84,166

Man from Cheyenne is a 1942 American Western film directed by Joseph Kane and starring Roy Rogers released on January 4, 1942.

== Plot ==
Roy Rogers is sent by the government to break up a cattle-rustling ring that's been terrorizing ranchers in Cheyenne. The rustlers are stealing cattle and then driving them to markets to sell. As Roy infiltrates the gang, he discovers that the operation is much more organized and sophisticated than initially thought. The rustlers are using trucks to transport the stolen cattle, a method that's more efficient and harder to trace.

Roy poses as a ranch hand to gather evidence against the gang. Along the way, he befriends Gabby Whittaker (played by George "Gabby" Hayes), a local rancher who becomes his sidekick. They work together to uncover the leader of the rustlers, who turns out to be a respected member of the community, hiding behind a facade of respectability. The film features a mix of action, romance, and musical numbers, typical of Roy Rogers films of that era. With the help of his horse Trigger and his friends, Roy manages to bring the rustlers to justice and restore peace to the area.

== Cast ==
- Roy Rogers as himself
- George "Gabby" Hayes as Gabby Whittaker
- Sally Payne as Sally Whittaker
- Lynne Carver as Marian Hardy
- William Haade as Ed
- James Seay as Jim
- Gale Storm as Judy Evans
- Jack Ingram as Jack
- Fred Burns as Harry
- Al Taylor as Ranchhand
- Ken Cooper as Bill
- Ivan Miller as Edwards
- Frank Brownlee as Old duffer
- Monte Montague as Harvey
- Guy Usher as Hendricks
- Jack Rockwell as Brenner
- Lynton Brent as Clerk
- Eddie Lee as Chinese cook
- Dorothy Christy
- Trigger as himself
- The Sons of the Pioneers:
  - Bob Nolan
  - Tim Spencer
  - Roy Rogers Riders
  - Pat Brady
  - Karl Farr
  - Hugh Farr
  - Lloyd Perryman

== Home media ==
On August 25, 2009, Alpha Video released Man from Cheyenne on Region 0 DVD.
