= Red River Valley (1941 film) =

1941 film by Joseph Kane

- Directed by: Joseph Kane
- Written by: Malcolm Stuart Boylan
- Starring: Roy Rogers; Gabby Hayes; Gale Storm
- Cinematography: Jack A. Marta
- Edited by: William P. Thompson
- Production company: Republic Pictures
- Distributed by: Republic Pictures
- Release date: December 12, 1941 (USA)
- Running time: 62 minutes
- Country: United States
- Language: English

Red River Valley is a 1941 American Western film about ranchers struggling to build a reservoir. It stars Roy Rogers, Gabby Hayes, and Gale Storm, and the director was Joseph Kane.
