= Sons of the Pioneers (film) =

1942 film by Joseph Kane

- Directed by: Joseph Kane
- Written by: Mauri Grashin; Robert T. Shannon; M. Coates Webster
- Produced by: Joseph Kane
- Starring: Roy Rogers; George 'Gabby' Hayes; Bob Nolan; Forrest Taylor
- Cinematography: Bud Thackery
- Edited by: Edward Schroeder
- Music by: Cy Feuer
- Distributed by: Republic Pictures
- Release date: July 2, 1942
- Running time: 62 minutes; 55 minutes
- Country: United States
- Language: English

Sons of the Pioneers is a 1942 American Western film directed by Joseph Kane and starring Roy Rogers, George "Gabby" Hayes and Bob Nolan. The film was part of the long-running series of Roy Rogers films produced by the Hollywood studio Republic Pictures.

== Cast ==
- Roy Rogers as Roy Rogers
- George 'Gabby' Hayes as Gabby Whittaker
- Maris Wrixon as Louise Harper
- Forrest Taylor as Jim Bixby
- Minerva Urecal as Ellie Bixby
- Bradley Page as Frank Bennett
- Hal Taliaferro a Henchman Matt
- Chester Conklin as Old-Timer
- Fred Burns as Rancher
- Sons of the Pioneers as Musicians, Cowhands

== Bibliography ==
- Hurst, Richard M. Republic Studios: Beyond Poverty Row and the Majors. Scarecrow Press, 2007.
