= Colorado (1940 film) =

1940 American Western directed by Joseph Kane

- Theatrical release poster
- Directed by: Joseph Kane
- Written by: Louis Stevens; Harrison Jacobs
- Produced by: Joseph Kane
- Starring: Roy Rogers
- Cinematography: Jack A. Marta
- Edited by: Edward Mann
- Production company: Republic Pictures
- Distributed by: Republic Pictures
- Release date: September 15, 1940 (United States)
- Running time: 57 minutes 54 minutes
- Country: United States
- Language: English

Colorado is a 1940 American Western film directed by Joseph Kane and starring Roy Rogers.

== Plot ==
During the American Civil War a Confederate officer who is also a Captain in the Union Cavalry is keeping Federal troops in the Colorado Territory from reinforcing their armies in the East by forming an alliance of secessionists, outlaws, and opportunists as well as arming hostile Indians. Unable to send more reinforcements, the United States Secret Service sends one man, Military intelligence officer Lieutenant Jerry Burke to identify who is behind the troubles and put an end to it. Armed with a sweeping letter of both law enforcement and military powers signed by President Abraham Lincoln Jerry meets his old comrade in arms Gabby to go west.

The Confederate/Union officer calling himself Donald Mason is actually Jerry's brother Donald. Donald escapes arrest but confronts his alliance that they are getting rich whilst he is doing all the work and facing all the danger. Donald takes over by shooting a corrupt Indian Affairs commissioner after informing him that the agent is no longer an asset but a liability.

Donald saves his brother's life and is repaid by Jerry by allowing him to face his end by ley de fuga instead of hanging after Jerry captures him.

== Cast ==
- Roy Rogers as Lieutenant Jerry Burke
- George "Gabby" Hayes as "Gabby" Whittaker
- Pauline Moore as Lylah Sanford
- Milburn Stone as Don Burke alias Captain Donald Mason
- Maude Eburne as Etta Mae
- Arthur Loft as Jim Macklin – Indian Commissioner
- Hal Taliaferro as Weaver
- Vester Pegg as Henchman Sam Smith
- Fred Burns as Sheriff Jeff Harkins
- Lloyd Ingraham as Henry Sanford
- Iron Eyes Cody as Indian Henchman
- Spade Cooley as Henchman
- Joseph Crehan as General Ulysses S. Grant

== Soundtrack ==
- Roy Rogers - "Night on the Prairie" (Written by Nathan Gluck and Ann Parentean)
- Played offscreen by a piano in a saloon - "Ring, Ring de Banjo!" (Written by Stephen Foster)
- Played offscreen by a piano in a saloon - "Gwine to Rune All Night" (De Camptown Races) (Written by Stephen Foster)
- Played offscreen by a piano in a saloon - "Oh! Susanna" (Written by Stephen Foster)
- Played offscreen by a bugler - "Taps" (Written by Daniel Butterfield)
- Played on piano by an unidentified man in a Durango bar - "Cielito Lindo" (Traditional Mexican Ballad)

== See also ==
- List of films and television shows about the American Civil War
