= Ghost Valley =

1932 film

- Theatrical poster for the film
- Directed by: Fred Allen
- Written by: Adele Buffington
- Produced by: William LeBaron
- Starring: Tom Keene
- Cinematography: Ted McCord
- Edited by: William Clemens
- Music by: Max Steiner
- Production company: RKO Radio Pictures
- Release date: May 13, 1932 (US)
- Running time: 61 minutes
- Country: United States
- Language: English
- Budget: $41,000
- Box office: $101,000

Ghost Valley is a 1932 American pre-Code drama film starring Tom Keene. It garnered a profit of $60,000.

== Plot ==
A jailed cowpoke is hired by the corrupt Judge Drake to impersonate one of the heirs to a gold mine. The cowpoke is, in fact, the missing heir, Jerry Long. Jerry Long fights and outwits the Judge and his henchmen, while winning the heart of the other heir to the mine, Jane Worth.

== Cast ==
- Tom Keene as Jerry Long
- Merna Kennedy as Jane Worth
- Kate Campbell as Miss Trumpet
- Mitchell Harris as Judge J. Drake
- Ted Adams as Gordon
- Harry Bowen as Marty
- Harry Semels as Henchman
- Billy Franey as Scrubby Watson
- Al Taylor as Henchman
- Buck Moulton as Henchman
- Slim Whitaker as Henchman
- George 'Gabby' Hayes as Dave

(cast list as per AFI database)
