= The Carson City Kid =

1940 film

- Theatrical release poster
- Directed by: Joseph Kane
- Screenplay by: Robert Yost; Gerald Geraghty
- Story by: Joseph Kane
- Produced by: Joseph Kane
- Starring: Roy Rogers; George "Gabby" Hayes
- Cinematography: William Nobles
- Edited by: Helene Turner
- Production company: Republic Pictures
- Distributed by: Republic Pictures
- Release date: July 1, 1940 (United States)
- Running time: 57 minutes 53 minutes
- Country: United States
- Language: English

The Carson City Kid is a 1940 American Western film directed by Joseph Kane starring Roy Rogers, George "Gabby" Hayes, and Bob Steele.

== Plot ==
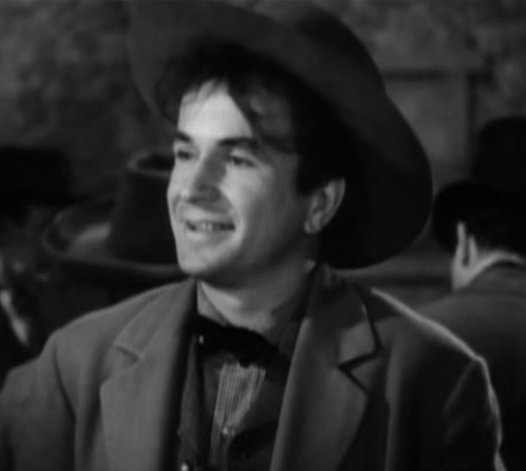
Noah Beery, Jr.

The Carson City Kid (Roy Rogers) is a stagecoach robber seeking vengeance on Morgan Reynolds (Bob Steele), the man who killed his brother. Reynolds is travelling with Laramie (Francis McDonald), a notorious half-breed outlaw. Rogers falls in love with saloon singer Joby Madison (Pauline Moore). George "Gabby" Hayes appears as Sheriff Gabby Whittaker.

== Cast ==
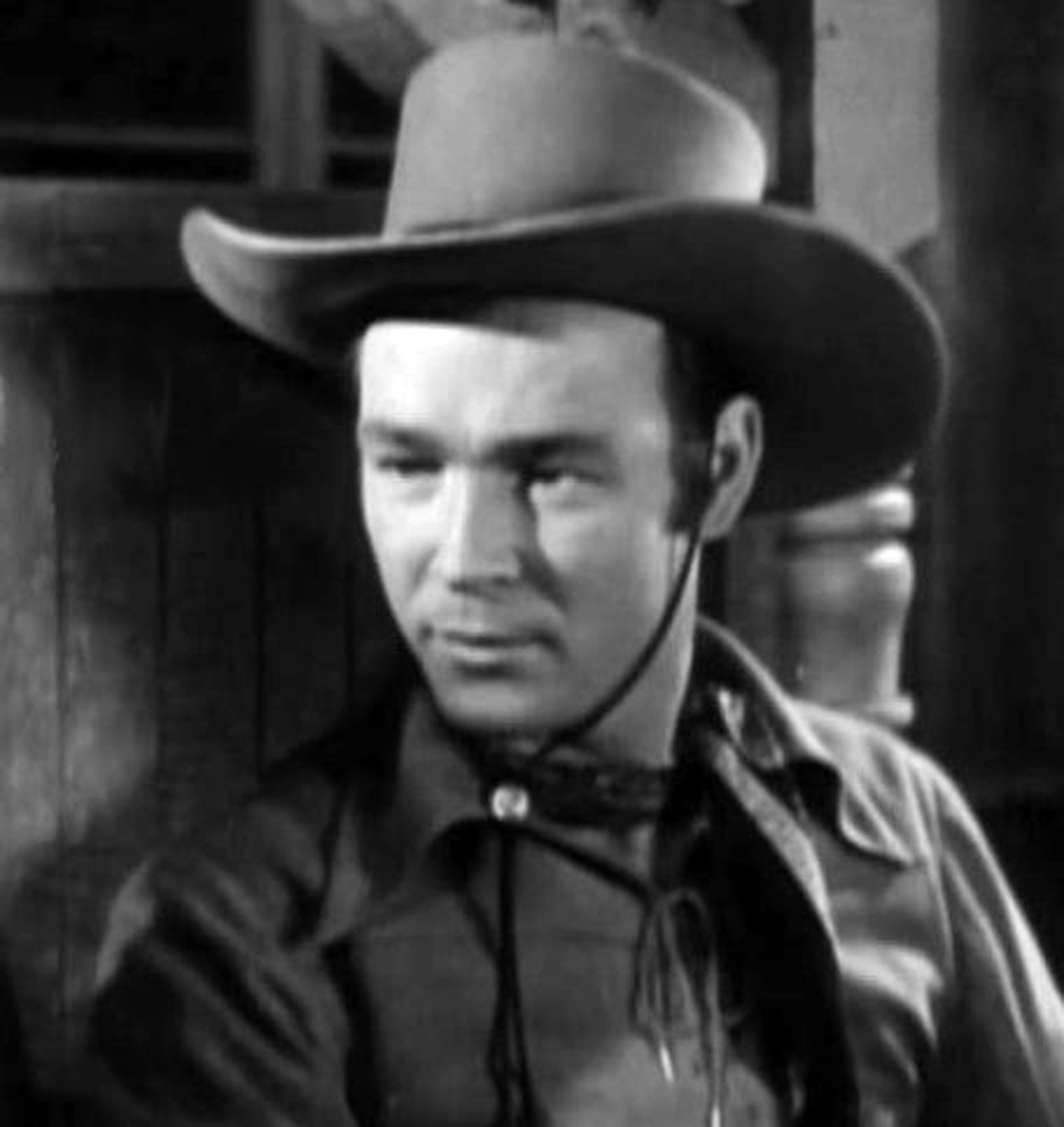
Roy Rogers in The Carson City Kid

- Roy Rogers as The Carson City Kid
- George "Gabby" Hayes as Marshal Gabby Whitaker
- Bob Steele as Lee Jessup / Morgan Reynolds
- Noah Beery, Jr. as Scott 'Arizona' Warren
- Pauline Moore as Joby Madison
- Francis McDonald as Laramie
- Hal Taliaferro as Rick Harmon
- Arthur Loft as Saloon drunk
- George Rosener as Judge Tucker
- Chester Gan as Wong Lee

== Soundtrack ==
- Pauline Moore – "The Golddigger Song" (Music and lyrics by Peter Tinturin)
- Pauline Moore – "You Are the One" (Music and lyrics by Peter Tinturin)
- Roy Rogers – "Sonora Moon" (Music and lyrics by Peter Tinturin)
- "Oh Susanna" (Music and lyrics by Stephen Foster as Stephen Collins Foster)
- "Camptown Races" (Music and lyrics by Stephen Foster as Stephen Collins Foster)
- "Polly Wolly Doodle"
- "Little Brown Jug" (Written by Joseph Winner)

== See also ==
- Public domain film
- List of American films of 1940
- List of films in the public domain in the United States
