= Days of Jesse James =

1939 film

- Theatrical release poster
- Directed by: Joseph Kane
- Written by: Earle Snell (screenplay); Jack Natteford (story)
- Produced by: Joseph Kane (associate producer)
- Starring: Roy Rogers; George 'Gabby' Hayes; Don 'Red' Barry
- Cinematography: Reggie Lanning
- Edited by: Tony Martinelli
- Music by: William Lava; Floyd Morgan
- Distributed by: Republic Pictures
- Release date: December 20, 1939
- Running time: 63 minutes
- Country: United States
- Language: English

Days of Jesse James is a 1939 American Western film directed by Joseph Kane and starring Roy Rogers.

== Plot ==
Roy gets involved in a punch up at a diner.

== Cast ==
- Roy Rogers as Roy Rogers
- George 'Gabby' Hayes as Gabby Whittaker
- Don 'Red' Barry as Jesse James
- Pauline Moore as Mary Whittaker
- Harry Woods as Captain Worthington
- Arthur Loft as Sam Wyatt
- Wade Boteler as Dr. R.S. Samuels
- Ethel Wales as Mrs. Martha Samuels
- Scotty Beckett as Buster Samuels
- Harry J. Worth as Frank James
- Glenn Strange as Cole Younger
- Olin Howland as Muncie Undersheriff
- Monte Blue as Train Passenger
- Jack Rockwell as Thompson McDaniels
- Fred Burns as Muncie Sheriff
- Dorothy Sebastian as Zerilda James

== Soundtrack ==
- Roy Rogers - "I'm a Son of a Cowboy" (Music and lyrics by Peter Tinturin)
- Roy Rogers - "Saddle Your Dreams" (Music and lyrics by Peter Tinturin)
- Roy Rogers - "Echo Mountain" (Music and lyrics by Peter Tinturin)
