= Sheriff of Tombstone =

1941 film by Joseph Kane

- Theatrical release poster
- Directed by: Joseph Kane
- Screenplay by: Olive Cooper
- Story by: James Webb
- Produced by: Joseph Kane
- Starring: Roy Rogers; George "Gabby" Hayes; Elyse Knox
- Cinematography: William Nobles
- Edited by: Tony Martinelli
- Music by: Cy Feuer
- Production company: Republic Pictures
- Distributed by: Republic Pictures
- Release date: May 7, 1941
- Running time: 54 minutes
- Country: United States
- Language: English

Sheriff of Tombstone is a 1941 American Western film directed by Joseph Kane and starring Roy Rogers, George "Gabby" Hayes and Elyse Knox. It was produced and distributed by Republic Pictures.

== Plot ==
Lawman Brett Starr leaves his job in Dodge City to take up a sheriff's job in Tombstone, Arizona where his two brothers live. Brett finds out that the position has been offered to the unscrupulous lawman Shotgun Cassidy. Starr impersonates Shotgun and after he is appointed sheriff seeks to expose the corruption and wrongdoing of the town authorities.

Brett's brother Bill is alive but brother Arthur was killed riding guard for a stagecoach. Mayor Luke Keeler appoints Brett Starr as Sheriff thinking he was Shotgun Cassidy. The Mayor, A. J. Slade and Joe Martinez (also Wells Fargo banker John Anderson) plan to take Granny Carson's interest in her silver mine for back taxes. The real Shotgun Cassidy arrives and the two opposing sides are set: Carson family and townsfolk against new Sheriff Shotgun and corrupt city officials.

Wells Fargo John Anderson is the double agent for the bad guys. Barmaid Queenie Whittaker is daughter to Judge Gabby and she works for the Carson side. Instead of shipping silver, Starr loads the wagons with men carrying rifles. When the convoy is attacked by robbers, most are shot dead. Shotgun, Crowley and Joe Martinez escape and set up sharpshooters in town. Cassidy is shot and Anderson, Keeler and Slade arrested for trial. Brett gets Mary in the end.

== Cast ==
- Roy Rogers as Brett Starr
- George "Gabby" Hayes as Judge Gabby Whittaker
- Elyse Knox as Mary Carson
- Addison Richards as Mayor Luke Keeler
- Sally Payne as Queenie Whittaker, aka Queenie LaTour
- Harry Woods as Shotgun Cassidy
- Zeffie Tilbury as Granny Carson
- Hal Taliaferro as A.J. Slade
- Jay Novello as John Anderson / Joe Martinez
- Jack Ingram as Bill Starr
- Jim Corey as Jed Crowley (uncredited)
- Trigger as Brett Starr's horse

== Soundtrack ==
- Roy Rogers - "Ridin' On a Rocky Road"
- Sally Payne, with Oscar Gahan (Piano) and Spade Cooley (Fiddle Player) - "Two-Gun Pete"
- Sally Payne - "Don't Gamble With Romance"
- Roy Rogers and George "Gabby" Hayes - "Sons of the Western Soil"

== Bibliography ==
- Fetrow, Alan G. Feature Films, 1940-1949: a United States Filmography. McFarland, 1994.
