= Si Jenks =

American actor (1876–1970)

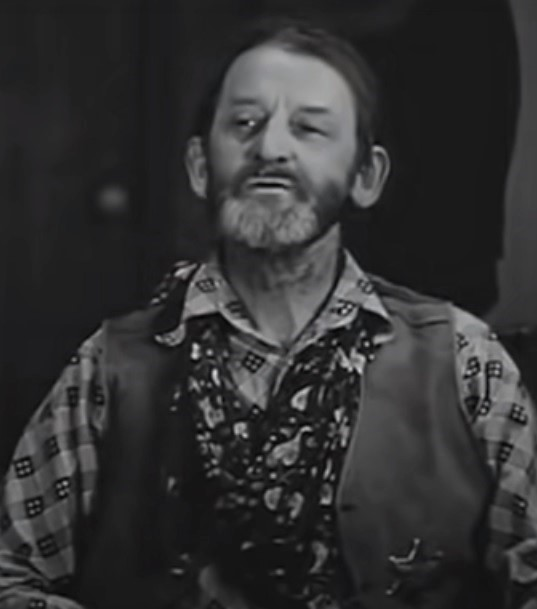
- Jenks in The Rider of the Law (1935)
- Born: Howard Hansell Jenkins; September 23, 1876; Norristown, Pennsylvania, U.S.
- Died: January 6, 1970 (aged 93); Woodland Hills, Los Angeles, California, U.S.
- Resting place: Forest Lawn Memorial Park, Hollywood Hills
- Occupation: Actor
- Years active: 1922–1954
- Spouse: Lilian Hartford (m. 1926)

Si Jenks (born Howard Hansell Jenkins; September 23, 1876 – January 6, 1970) was an American actor. He was involved in 224 films in a career spanning nearly two decades in vaudeville and films. His best known appearances include The Village Blacksmith, The Rider of the Law, Oregon Trail, The Cowboy Star, Zorro's Black Whip and The Great Train Robbery.

== Early life ==
Jenks was born in Norristown, Pennsylvania on September 23, 1876, to parents John and Catherine Jenkins. As a young boy, Jenks would enjoy watching his local champion baseball team. On one occasion, he was summoned to act as umpire after the crowd grew dissatisfied with the person who had been appointed to adjudge the game. Jenks accepted the challenge "with boyish alacrity", surrendering his seat on a soapbox and ultimately was accepted by the audience with his decision making.

From April 1898 to October 1898, he served in the National Guard of the United States as a reserve volunteer.

== Career ==
Jenks began his career sometime around the early 1890s in theatre, having run away from home and joined Diamond Jack's medicine show in Norristown, Pennsylvania. He later travelled over the United States with circuses and was associated with Professor Gleason, a noted horse trainer of that time. He was a comedian with the 101 ranch in 1908 and later travelled with them to Mexico.

He found early success on a Broadway theatre production of Get Rich Quick Wallingford, playing the role of the rube bus driver for 55 weeks. Jenks later moved into Hollywood films and took vaudeville roles in movie comedies from around 1921. In 1924, he commented that his work as a comedian was "the hardest work in the world", having experienced dislocated knees, nearly being blinded by stage lights and having paint thrown at him.

During the 1930s, he performed in films such as Naughty Marietta, Stand Up and Cheer! and Fighting Shadows.

== Personal life ==
He was married to Lilian Annie Jenkins (née Hartford; 1882 – 1983), who he met during the 1920s and married in 1926 in New Jersey. She was born in Bury, Lancashire, England and began her stage career aged 4. She lived around Los Angeles since 1923. They acted on stage together during the 1920s in the act of "Si Jenks and Lilian Hartford" and later moved to a retirement facility in 1965. She was the first resident of the Motion Picture and Television Country Home and Hospital to become a centenarian. The couple had two daughters who pre-deceased Lilian Jenks, who died in June 1983.

According to his World War I draft registration card, he was also earlier married to Victoria A Jenkins. Jenks and Allen were described as "two excellent acts of vaudeville" by the Logansport Pharos-Tribune in 1920 and were known as "The Small Town Wise Crackers".

=== Death ===
On January 6, 1970, Jenks died in Woodland Hills, Los Angeles, of complications after suffering a heart disease. His gravesite is at Forest Lawn, Hollywood Hills Cemetery in Los Angeles.

== Filmography ==
- The Village Blacksmith (1922)
- Picking Peaches (1924)*short
- Self Defense (1932)
- Lightning Range (1933)
- Rawhide Romance (1934)
- Sixteen Fathoms Deep (1934)
- Charlie Chan's Courage (1934)
- Judge Priest (1934)
- Stand Up and Cheer! (1934)
- The Rider of the Law (1934)
- Naughty Marietta (1935)
- Fighting Shadows (1935)
- Another Face (1935)
- Captain January (1936)
- The Ranger and the Lady (1940) as Freighter Frank Purdy
