= Death Valley Manhunt =

1943 film by John English

- Theatrical release poster
- Directed by: John English
- Screenplay by: Norman S. Hall; Anthony Coldeway
- Story by: Fred Myton; Edward J. White
- Produced by: Edward J. White
- Starring: Wild Bill Elliott; George "Gabby" Hayes; Anne Jeffreys; Weldon Heyburn; Herbert Heyes; Davison Clark
- Cinematography: Ernest Miller
- Edited by: Harry Keller
- Music by: Mort Glickman
- Production company: Republic Pictures
- Distributed by: Republic Pictures
- Release date: November 24, 1943
- Running time: 55 minutes
- Country: United States
- Language: English

Death Valley Manhunt is a 1943 American Western film directed by John English and written by Norman S. Hall and Anthony Coldeway. The film stars Wild Bill Elliott, George "Gabby" Hayes, Anne Jeffreys, Weldon Heyburn, Herbert Heyes and Davison Clark. The film was released on November 24, 1943, by Republic Pictures.

== Plot ==
Marshall Wild Bill Elliot pursues a retirement of ranching after enjoying a successful career. Elliot's friend, Gabby Hayes tries to get him to go to Death Valley, where Hayes owns land used for oil drilling. Elliot declines the offer but Hayes travels to the area with his dog, Teabone. Whilst in the nearby town, Hayes speaks with his friend and fellow oil driller Tex Benson, who warns him not to come into contact with a certain Richard Quinn, the field manager of another oil extraction company who has secret attempts to sabotage smaller oil companies.

Following an attack on his well by Quinn's henchmen, Benson proceeds to steal equipment from Quinn's own well. Quinn then takes Benson to court where Judge Jim Hobart (who reluctantly works for Quinn) issues an arrest warrant for Benson. Marshall Hugh Ward is sent to arrest Benson, but ends up being killed accidentally. Quinn claims the death was a murder by Benson and has him imprisoned by Hobart.

== Cast ==
- Wild Bill Elliott as Marshal Wild Bill Elliott
- George "Gabby" Hayes as Gabby Hayes
- Anne Jeffreys as Nicky Hobart
- Weldon Heyburn as Richard Quinn
- Herbert Heyes as Judge Jim Hobart
- Davison Clark as Tex Benson
- Pierce Lyden as Clayton
- Charles Murray Jr. as Danny
- Jack Kirk as Marshal Hugh Ward
- Eddie Phillips as Deputy Marshal Blaine
- Bud Geary as Henchman Sid Roberts
- Al Taylor as Deputy Marshal Lawson
