= Guns and Guitars =

1936 film by Joseph Kane

- Theatrical release poster
- Directed by: Joseph Kane
- Written by: Dorrell McGowan; Stuart E. McGowan
- Produced by: Nat Levine
- Starring: Gene Autry; Smiley Burnette; Dorothy Dix
- Cinematography: Ernest Miller
- Edited by: Lester Orlebeck
- Music by: Harry Grey (supervisor)
- Production company: Republic Pictures
- Distributed by: Republic Pictures
- Release date: June 22, 1936 (USA)
- Running time: 57 minutes
- Country: United States
- Language: English

Guns and Guitars is a 1936 American Western film directed by Joseph Kane and starring Gene Autry, Smiley Burnette, and Dorothy Dix in her final film appearance. Written by Dorrell and Stuart E. McGowan, the film is about a singing cowboy who helps protect a county from fever-ridden cattle, and after being framed for murdering the sheriff, proves his innocence, gets elected sheriff, and then goes after the bad guy.

== Plot ==
Colima County, Texas has barred the entry of cattle from fever-ridden Sage County, where two unscrupulous schemers, Morhan and Conner, have raised thousands of head of the cattle suffering from Texas Cattle Fever. The cattle are secretly owned by leading citizen Dave Morgan (J.P. McGowan). While driving the diseased cattle to a railhead for shipping, they cross a corner of Colima Country and are spotted and fired upon by Marjorie Miller (Dorothy Dix), daughter of Sheriff Ed Miller (Jack Rockwell). The outlaws are about to kidnap the girl when Gene Autry (Gene Autry), Frog Millhouse (Smiley Burnette), and Shorty (Frankie Marvin) arrive on the scene and rescue the girl. Gene and his sidekicks are traveling with Professor Parker's traveling medicine show.

Morgan stages a town meeting and tries to prove that the fever is not contagious with the help of quack veterinarian Dr. Schaefer (Harrison Greene). Morgan's plan is foiled by Professor Parker (Earle Hodgins), a real veterinarian who emphatically states that the disease is contagious. After the townspeople run Schaefer out of town and vote to support the quarantine, Connor orders Gene to leave town by five o'clock or face the consequences. Gene makes it clear that he is staying and Professor Parker and his troupe conduct their show. Meanwhile, Sheriff Miller and Deputy Clark are riding on the trail and discussing the case when they are ambushed by Connor and Sam who leave the lawmen for dead. Gene and Frog find the lawmen; Clark is dead, but Miller is still alive. Gene decides to keep their discovery secret until they can find Clark's killer.

Meanwhile, Morgan is determined to get his henchman, Frank Hall (Pascale Perry), elected sheriff so that he can drive his infected cattle to auction. The opposing candidate is driven away by threats from Morgan's men. The people then nominate Gene to run against Hall. Desperate to undermine Gene's candidacy, Morgan finds Miller's handcuffs and badge in Gene's hotel room and accuses Gene of killing Miller. he tries to have him arrested, but Gene escapes. With little hope of Gene winning the election now, Marjorie organizes the town's women, and all of them convince their men to vote for Gene, who wins the election by a landslide.

Morgan and his men make one last attempt to drive their cattle across the county. Gene organizes a posse and goes after Morgan's men. Following a shootout, they chase Morgan and Connor and trick them into revealing that they know where Miller and Clark were hidden, thereby confirming their guilt. Sheriff Miller congratulates Gene and Frog as they put Morgan and Connor in jail. With peace restored in the town, Professor Parker's traveling medicine show moves on.

== Cast ==
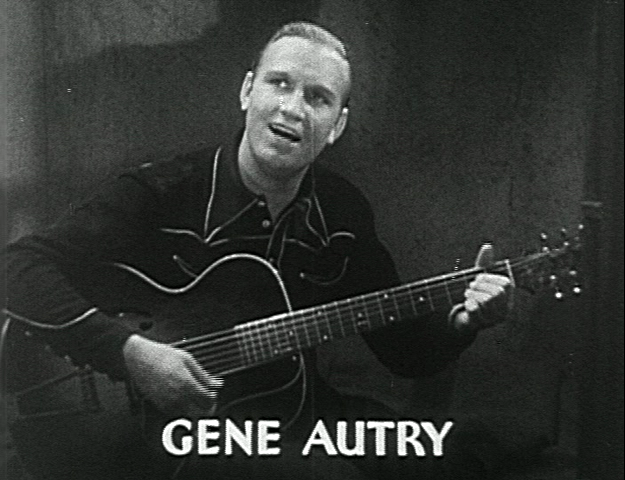
Gene Autry, 1936

- Gene Autry as Gene Autry
- Smiley Burnette as Frog Millhouse
- Dorothy Dix as Marjorie Miller
- Earle Hodgins as Professor Parker
- J.P. McGowan as Dave Morgan
- Champion as Gene's Horse
- Tom London as Henchman Connor
- Charles King as Henchman Sam
- Frankie Marvin as Shorty
- Eugene Jackson as Eightball
- Jack Rockwell as Sheriff Ed Miller
- Ken Cooper as Deputy Clark
- Tracy Layne as Henchman
- Wes Warner as Henchman
- Jack Kirk as Chubby Man at Show
- Art Davis as Violin Player
- Jim Corey as Henchman Buck
- Al Taylor as Cowhand
- Frank Stravenger as Henchman
- Jack Don as Sing Lee
- Harrison Greene as Dr. Schaefer, the Veterinarian (uncredited)
- Pascale Perry as Frank Hall (uncredited)

== Production ==
=== Stuntwork ===
- Ken Cooper (uncredited)
- Francis Walker (uncredited)
- Joe Yrigoyen (uncredited)

=== Filming locations ===
- Garner Valley, California, USA

=== Soundtrack ===
- "Ridin' All Day" (Gene Autry, Smiley Burnette) by Gene Autry (vocal and guitar)
- "The Cowboy Medicine Show" (Gene Autry, Smiley Burnette) by Gene Autry and Medicine Show people
- "Gwine to Rune All Night (De Camptown Races)" (Stephen Foster) by the Show Band and danced by Eugene Jackson
- "I've Got Fine Relations" (Smiley Burnette) by Smiley Burnette with the Show Band
- "Guns and Guitars" (Gene Autry, Oliver Drake) by Gene Autry and Medicine Show people
- "For He's a Jolly Good Fellow" (Traditional) by townsmen at an election meeting
- "Snake Charmer" (Traditional) by Smiley Burnette in drag
- "Dreamy Valley" (Oliver Drake, Harry Grey) by Gene Autry (vocal and guitar)
