= Robin Hood of the Pecos =

1941 film by Joseph Kane

- Theatrical release poster
- Directed by: Joseph Kane
- Screenplay by: Olive Cooper
- Story by: Hal Long
- Produced by: Joseph Kane
- Starring: Roy Rogers; George "Gabby" Hayes; Marjorie Reynolds
- Cinematography: Jack A. Marta
- Edited by: Charles Craft
- Music by: Cy Feuer
- Production company: Republic Pictures
- Distributed by: Republic Pictures
- Release date: January 14, 1941 (United States)
- Running time: 59 minutes
- Country: United States
- Language: English

Robin Hood of the Pecos is a 1941 American Western film directed by Joseph Kane and starring Roy Rogers, George "Gabby" Hayes and Marjorie Reynolds. It was produced and distributed by Republic Pictures.

== Cast ==
- Roy Rogers as Vance Corbin
- George "Gabby" Hayes as Gabriel "Gabby" Hornaday
- Marjorie Reynolds as Jeanie Grayson
- Cy Kendall as Ambrose Ballard
- Leigh Whipper as Kezeye
- Sally Payne as Belle Starr
- Eddie Acuff as Sam Starr
- Robert Strange as Wilbur Cravens

== Bibliography ==
- Fetrow, Alan G. Feature Films, 1940-1949: a United States Filmography. McFarland, 1994. ISBN 978-0-89950-914-3.
