= Joseph Kane =

American film director (1894–1975)

- Joseph Kane
- Born: Jasper Joseph Inman Kane; March 19, 1894; San Diego, California, US
- Died: August 25, 1975 (aged 81); Santa Monica, California, US
- Occupations: Film director; film producer; film editor; screenwriter

Jasper Joseph Inman Kane (March 19, 1894 – August 25, 1975) was an American film director, film producer, film editor and screenwriter. He is best known for his extensive directorship and focus on Western films.

== Biography ==
Kane began his career as a professional cellist. In 1934 he took an interest in film directing and, starting in 1935, he co-directed serials for Mascot Pictures and Republic Pictures. He soon became Republic's top Western film director.

Kane's first directorial credit was for The Fighting Marines (1935). When Mascot Pictures and several other small film companies amalgamated into Republic Pictures in 1935, Kane became staff director, remaining at the studio until it ceased production in 1958. He piloted many Gene Autry and Roy Rogers movies and directed John Wayne in films such as The Lawless Nineties (1936) and Flame of Barbary Coast (1944), and Joseph Schildkraut on The Cheaters (1945). Between 1935 and his death in 1975 he directed 119 films and numerous television series episodes.

Unlike most Republic house directors, Kane was also credited as associate producer on many of his films. During 1939–57 he was a major film producer, producing over 60 films. Kane was also a film editor and screenwriter responsible for the editing process of over 20 of his films, and he had a brief stint as an actor.

During the 1950s Kane worked steadily in television, with emphasis on Westerns and action series. He spent the last decade of his life as a second-unit director on such productions as Universal Studios Beau Geste (1966) and In Enemy Country (1968).

Kane died on August 25, 1975, in Santa Monica, California.

== Partial filmography ==
- The Blind Trail (1926)
- The Cherokee Kid (1927)
- The Bronc Stomper (1928)
- Yellow Contraband (1928)
- The Boss of Rustler's Roost (1928)
- The Black Ace (1928)
- The Pride of Pawnee (1929)
- .45 Calibre War (1929)
- Big Money (1930)
- The Big Gamble (1931) with William Boyd
- In Old Santa Fe (1934) with Ken Maynard, George "Gabby" Hayes, and Gene Autry
- Tumbling Tumblingweeds (1935) with Gene Autry and Smiley Burnette
- The Headline Woman (1935)
- Melody Trail (1935) with Gene Autry, Ann Rutherford, and Smiley Burnette
- The Lawless Nineties (1936) with John Wayne, Ann Rutherford and George "Gabby" Hayes
- Darkest Africa with Clyde Beatty
- King of the Pecos (1936) with John Wayne and Muriel Evans
- The Lonely Trail (1936) with John Wayne and Ann Rutherford
- Guns and Guitars (1936) with Gene Autry and Smiley Burnette
- Oh, Susanna! (1936) with Gene Autry and Smiley Burnette
- Ride Ranger Ride (1936) with Gene Autry and Smiley Burnette
- The Old Corral (1936) with Gene Autry and Smiley Burnette
- Undersea Kingdom (1936)
- Git Along, Little Dogies (1937) with Gene Autry and Smiley Burnette
- Round-Up Time in Texas (1937) with Gene Autry and Smiley Burnette
- Yodelin' Kid from Pine Ridge (1937) with Gene Autry and Smiley Burnette
- Public Cowboy No. 1 (1937) with Gene Autry, Smiley Burnette, and Ann Rutherford
- Boots and Saddles (1937) with Gene Autry and Smiley Burnette
- Springtime in the Rockies (1937) with Gene Autry and Smiley Burnette
- Heart of the Rockies (1937)
- The Old Barn Dance (1938) with Gene Autry, Smiley Burnette, and Roy Rogers
- Under Western Stars (1938) with Roy Rogers (in his first lead role) and Smiley Burnette
- Gold Mine in the Sky (1938) with Gene Autry and Smiley Burnette
- Man from Music Mountain (1938) with Gene Autry and Smiley Burnette
- Come On, Rangers (1938) with Roy Rogers
- Shine On, Harvest Moon (1938) with Roy Rogers
- In Old Monterey (1939) with Gene Autry and Sarie and Sallie
- Days of Jesse James (1939) with Roy Rogers and George "Gabby" Hayes
- Colorado (1940) with Roy Rogers
- Sheriff of Tombstone (1941) with Roy Rogers and George "Gabby" Hayes
- Robin Hood of the Pecos (1941) with Roy Rogers and George "Gabby" Hayes
- Man from Cheyenne (1942) with Roy Rogers and George "Gabby" Hayes
- Sons of the Pioneers (1942) with Roy Rogers
- Romance on the Range (1942) with Roy Rogers and George "Gabby" Hayes
- The Man from Music Mountain (1943) with Roy Rogers
- King of the Cowboys (1943) with Roy Rogers and Smiley Burnette
- The Cowboy and the Senorita (1944) with Roy Rogers
- The Yellow Rose of Texas (1944) with Roy Rogers
- Flame of Barbary Coast (1945) with John Wayne and William Frawley
- Dakota (1945) with John Wayne and Walter Brennan
- Wyoming (1947)
- The Last Bandit (1949)
- Brimstone (1949)
- California Passage (1950)
- Ride the Man Down (1952) with Brian Donlevy and Ella Raines
- Hoodlum Empire (1952) with Brian Donlevy and Claire Trevor
- Fair Wind to Java (1953) with Fred MacMurray, Vera Ralston, and Robert Douglas
- Jubilee Trail (1954) with Vera Ralston
- Timberjack (1955) with Sterling Hayden and Hoagy Carmichael
- The Road to Denver (1955) with John Payne, Mona Freeman, Lee J. Cobb, Ray Middleton, and Skip Homeier
- Accused of Murder (1956) with David Brian, Vera Ralston, and Sidney Blackmer
- The Maverick Queen (1956) with Barbara Stanwyck
- The Crooked Circle (1957) with John Smith and Fay Spain
- Track of Thunder (1967) with Faith Domergue
- The Search for the Evil One (1967) with Lee Patterson and Lisa Pera
- Smoke in the Wind (1975) with Walter Brennan

== Notable actors directed by Kane ==
- Robert Armstrong
- Gene Autry
- Clyde Beatty
- Scott Brady
- Walter Brennan
- Edgar Buchanan
- Smiley Burnette
- Rod Cameron
- Lee Van Cleef
- Elisha Cook, Jr.
- Jim Davis
- Paul Fix
- Sterling Hayden
- George "Gabby" Hayes
- Jack Ingram
- Chubby Johnson
- Fred MacMurray
- Gerald Mohr
- Peggy Moran
- Jack O'Shea
- Roy Rogers
- Ann Rutherford
- Barbara Stanwyck
- John Wayne
- Hank Worden
