= Harry Depp =

American actor

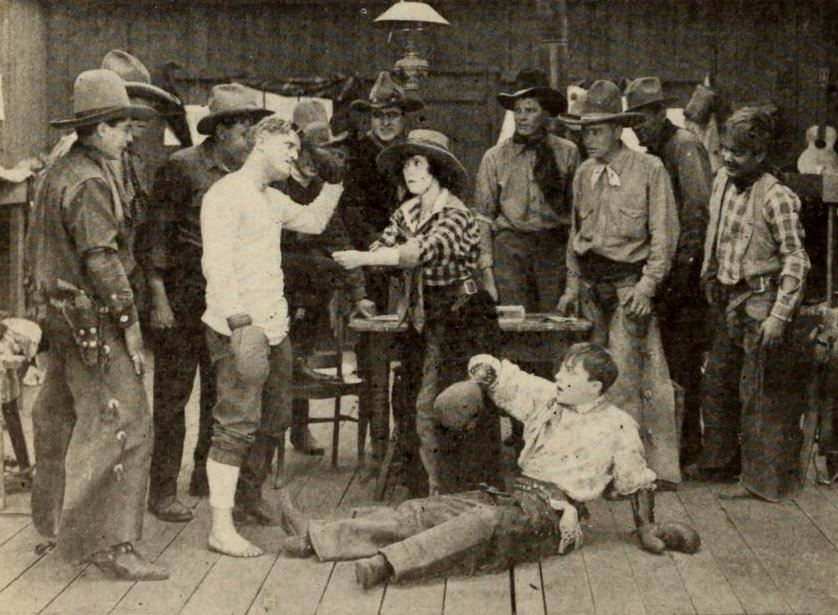
- Still from the film Rowdy Ann (1919) with Al Haynes (white shirt), Fay Tincher, and Harry Depp (on ground)
- Born: Harry Depp; 22 February 1883; St. Louis, Missouri, USA
- Died: March 31, 1957 (aged 74); Hollywood, California, USA
- Occupation(s): Stage and film actor, comedian, writer, real estate agent
- Years active: 1916–1947
- Spouses: Nedra Belle Gilosky (m. 1915; died 1932) Helen William Luther (m. 1950)
- Children: Evelyn Christine

Harry Depp (22 February 1883 – 31 March 1957) was an American film actor, silent film pioneer, comedian, agent and real estate investor. He was born 22 February 1883 in St. Louis, Missouri to William Depp and Laura Freund. Between 1916 and 1947 he starred in 195 films.

== Career ==
He started as a stage actor in New York City. He worked in early film on the East Coast, and eventually in Hollywood with companies such as Universal Film Manufacturing Company, Victor Film Company, Triangle Film Corporation, and also with Christie Film Company. In 1911, he starred in Klaw & Erlanger's The Pink Lady, a musical comedy by Ivan Caryll and C.M.S. McLellan.

Between 1916 and 1917 he worked for Mack Sennett, often being cast for supporting roles that required impersonation of female characters. He later joined Universal where he continued cross-dressing to a degree.

He had an extensive filmography, and was not only a featured comedic player with Triangle, Christie, Universal, Warner Brothers, but continued acting in small parts through the 1940s, even as Catterson - The Chemist in Leave Her to Heaven. He continued to work as a character actor in many films through the 1930s and 1940s.

At some point in the 1920s, he suffered partial facial paralysis, and was not able to continue acting. He went into real estate, possibly with the help of the Christie Brothers: Al Christie, and Charles Christie, who while producing motion pictures, also had a real estate company. The 1930 Federal Census lists his profession as Real Estate Sales.

In 1915, he married Nedra Belle Gilosky. They had one daughter, Evelyn Christine in 1928. Belle died in 1932. In 1950, Harry married Helen William.

== Selected filmography ==
- 1916: A Youth of Fortune - Peters
- 1916: The Love Girl - The Boy Next Door
- 1916: Saving the Family Name - Billie Schramm
- 1917: The Haunted House
- 1918: The Man Who Woke Up - G. Waldo Campbell
- 1918: The Strange Woman - Charles Abbey
- 1920: Sic-Em - Timothy Crawford
- 1922: Quincy Adams Sawyer - Cobb Twin
- 1923: Nobody's Money - Eddie Maloney
- 1923: His Last Race - Denny
- 1924: Inez from Hollywood (by Alfred E. Green) - Scoop Smith
- 1926: When the Wife's Away
- 1933: The Crime of the Century - Police Recorder (uncredited)
- 1933: Central Airport - Hotel Telephone Operator (uncredited)
- 1933: Her Bodyguard - Dresser (uncredited)
- 1933: Blood Money (by Rowland Brown) - Florist (uncredited)
- 1934: The Cat and the Fiddle - Lotte Lengel's Husband (uncredited)
- 1934: The Girl from Missouri - Paige's Clerk (uncredited)
- 1934: Straight Is the Way - Violin Teacher (uncredited)
- 1934: One Hour Late - Fiddle Player (uncredited)
- 1934: You Belong to Me (by Alfred L. Werker)
- 1935: Helldorado - (uncredited)
- 1935: One More Spring (by Henry King) - Husband (uncredited)
- 1935: The Murder Man - Short Investor (uncredited)
- 1935: Atlantic Adventure - Reporter (uncredited)
- 1935: Here Comes Cookie - Village Banker (uncredited)
- 1935: His Night Out - Rosebottom (uncredited)
- 1935: I Live My Life (directed by W. S. Van Dyke) - Clerk with Glasses (uncredited)
- 1935: Barbary Coast - Clothing Peddler (uncredited)
- 1935: Coronado - Shore Patrolman (uncredited)
- 1935: The Lone Wolf Returns - Masquerade Party Guest (uncredited)
- 1935: The Bride Comes Home
- 1936: The Music Goes 'Round - Minor Role (uncredited)
- 1936: Desire - Gibson's Clerk (uncredited)
- 1936: Love Before Breakfast - Secretary (uncredited)
- 1936: Colleen - Noggin's Assistant (uncredited)
- 1936: Panic on the Air - Gordon's Secretary (uncredited)
- 1936: Fatal Lady - American Tourist (uncredited)
- 1936: Counterfeit - Henpecked Husband (uncredited)
- 1936: The Last Outlaw - Hopkins - Banker (uncredited)
- 1936: And Sudden Death - Collins (uncredited)
- 1936: Earthworm Tractors - Johnson's Bookkeeper (uncredited)
- 1936: A Son Comes Home - Court Stenographer (uncredited)
- 1936: Alibi for Murder - Julius Scott (uncredited)
- 1936: The Big Broadcast of 1937 - Assistant Property Man
- 1936: Rose Bowl - King (uncredited)
- 1936: Easy to Take - Relative (uncredited)
- 1936: Come Closer, Folks - Mr. Pidgeon (uncredited)
- 1936: Pennies from Heaven (by Norman Z. McLeod) - Union Costume Supply Man (uncredited)
- 1937: Find the Witness - Dr. Rice (uncredited)
- 1937: Time Out for Romance - News Dealer (uncredited)
- 1937: Love Is News (by Tay Garnett) - Salesman (uncredited)
- 1937: History Is Made at Night - Waiting Customer at Victor's (uncredited)
- 1937: Parole Racket - Bleekman (uncredited)
- 1937: Swing It, Professor - Trustee
- 1937: Bill Cracks Down - Smalley - the Lawyer
- 1937: Top of the Town - Secretary (uncredited)
- 1937: Motor Madness - Swanson (uncredited)
- 1937: As Good as Married - Little Man (uncredited)
- 1937: Turn Off the Moon - Tailor (uncredited)
- 1937: The Go Getter - J. Brown #3 (uncredited)
- 1937: It Can't Last Forever - Fight Spectator (uncredited)
- 1937: The Women Men Marry - Buyer (uncredited)
- 1937: Wife, Doctor and Nurse (by Walter Lang) - Little Man (uncredited)
- 1937: Charlie Chan on Broadway (by Eugene Forde) - Candid Camera Snapper (uncredited)
- 1937: Counsel for Crime - Shyster (uncredited)
- 1937: Thoroughbreds Don't Cry - Official at Racetrack (uncredited)
- 1937: The Duke Comes Back - (uncredited)
- 1938: Hollywood Stadium Mystery -Ring Announcer (uncredited)
- 1938: Arson Gang Busters - Henchman (uncredited)
- 1938: The Saint in New York - Shooting Witness (uncredited)
- 1938: One Wild Night - Druggist (uncredited)
- 1938: Squadron of Honor - Tim (uncredited)
- 1938: Crime Ring - Phoebe's Guest with Glasses (uncredited)
- 1938: Pals of the Saddle (directed by George Sherman) - Hotel Desk Clerk
- 1938: Mysterious Mr. Moto - Little Man (uncredited)
- 1938: Slander House - Higginbotham
- 1938: The Spider's Web (Serial) - Oswald (uncredited)
- 1938: International Settlement (directed by Eugene Forde)
- 1939: Made for Each Other - Hutch (uncredited)
- 1939: East Side of Heaven - Executive (uncredited)
- 1939: The Return of the Cisco Kid - Bank Teller (uncredited)
- 1939: Tell No Tales - Robert E. Moore (uncredited)
- 1939: Those High Grey Walls - Convict (uncredited)
- 1939: Mr. Smith Goes to Washington (directed by Frank Capra) - Hat Salesman / Secretary (uncredited)
- 1939: Little Accident (directed by Charles Lamont) - Meek (uncredited)
- 1939: Swanee River - Dresser (uncredited)
- 1939: Disputed Passage (directed by Frank Borzage)
- 1939: Remember the Night - Jury Member (uncredited)
- 1940: City of Chance - Bridge Player (uncredited)
- 1940: Danger Ahead - Jones
- 1940: Forty Little Mothers - Harry - Judge's Secretary (uncredited)
- 1940: Men Without Souls - Male Secretary (uncredited)
- 1940: The Mortal Storm (directed by Frank Borzage) - 2nd Colleague
- 1940: The Man I Married (directed by Irving Pichel) - Little Man with Eric (uncredited)
- 1940: Mystery Sea Raider - Mousey Little Man (uncredited)
- 1940: Foreign Correspondent (directed by Alfred Hitchcock) - Uncle Buren (uncredited)
- 1940: Public Deb No. 1 - Grocery Clerk (uncredited)
- 1940: I'm Nobody's Sweetheart Now - Judge (uncredited)
- 1940: Life with Henry - Husband (uncredited)
- 1940: Gallant Sons - Husband with Birdcage (uncredited)
- 1940: Alias the Deacon
- 1941: Golden Hoofs - Clerk (uncredited)
- 1941: The Lady Eve - Man with Glasses on Ship (uncredited)
- 1941: A Girl, a Guy and a Gob (directed by Richard Wallace) - Mr. Harmon - Minister (scenes deleted)
- 1941: Angels with Broken Wings - (uncredited)
- 1941: Paper Bullets - Johnny Mason
- 1941: The Big Store (directed by Charles Reisner) - Timid Man (uncredited)
- 1941: Desperate Cargo - Crouse (small male passenger)
- 1941: Richest Man in Town - Townsman (uncredited)
- 1941: Ice-Capades - Reporter (uncredited)
- 1941: Sailors on Leave - Shore Patrolman (uncredited)
- 1941: The Stork Pays Off - Mr. Kearn (uncredited)
- 1941: Confessions of Boston Blackie - Mr. Bigsby (uncredited)
- 1941: Honolulu Lu - Dentist (uncredited)
- 1941: Mr. District Attorney in the Carter Case - Bit Role (uncredited)
- 1941: Bedtime Story - Spray Man (uncredited)
- 1942: Broadway Big Shot - Ben Marlo
- 1942: Heart of the Rio Grande - Mr. Simpson (uncredited)
- 1942: Alias Boston Blackie - Mr. Jones - Hotel Desk Clerk (uncredited)
- 1942: Ship Ahoy - Man in Kissing Line (uncredited)
- 1942: Dr. Broadway (directed by Anthony Mann) - Customer (uncredited)
- 1942: The Magnificent Dope - Sixth Man to Leave Class (uncredited)
- 1942: Priorities on Parade - Jonesy - Hartley's Secretary (uncredited)
- 1942: Phantom Killer - Lester P. Cutler
- 1942: The Living Ghost - Homer Hawkins (uncredited)
- 1943: Ghosts on the Loose - John G. Elwood (uncredited)
- 1943: Thank Your Lucky Stars - Table Extra in Bette Davis Number (uncredited)
- 1943: I Dood It (directed by Vincente Minnelli) - Kissing Man Yelling 'Yippee' (uncredited)
- 1943: Girl Crazy (directed by Norman Taurog and Busby Berkeley) - Short Nervous Man in Nightclub (uncredited)
- 1944: Sailor's Holiday - Photographer (uncredited)
- 1944: The Lady and the Monster - Bank Teller (uncredited)
- 1944: Ladies of Washington - Mr. Wethering (uncredited)
- 1944: Goodnight, Sweetheart - Townsman (uncredited)
- 1944: Johnny Doesn't Live Here Any More - David (uncredited)
- 1944: The Port of 40 Thieves - Train Conductor
- 1944: Black Magic - Charles Edwards
- 1944: Ever Since Venus - Taylor (uncredited)
- 1944: Shadow of Suspicion -Borteaux (uncredited)
- 1945: The Big Show-Off - G. Whitmore Peabody (uncredited)
- 1945: There Goes Kelly - J. B. Hastings
- 1945: Fashion Model - Harvey Van Allen
- 1945: In Old New Mexico - Sam - Bartender (uncredited)
- 1945: Wonder Man - Man at Library (uncredited)
- 1945: Road to Alcatraz - House Manager
- 1945: State Fair (directed by Walter Lang) - Judge's Secretary (uncredited)
- 1945: Sunset in El Dorado - Bus Passenger (uncredited)
- 1945: Captain Tugboat Annie - Mike
- 1946: Leave Her to Heaven - Catterson - the Chemist (uncredited)
- 1946: A Letter for Evie - Straphanger (uncredited)
- 1946: Do You Love Me - Singing Western Union Boy (uncredited)
- 1946: Two Smart People (directed by Jules Dassin) - Spectator (uncredited)
- 1946: Blonde for a Day - Mr. Henty - Apartment House Manager (uncredited)
- 1946: Shadows Over Chinatown - Dr. Denby
- 1946: Rendezvous with Annie (directed by Allan Dwan) - Emery Bartlett (uncredited)
- 1946: Gentleman Joe Palooka - Little Man (uncredited)
- 1946: Blue Skies (directed by Stuart Heisler) - Would-Be Engagement Ring Buyer (uncredited)
- 1946: Lady Luck - Elderly Gent in Bookstore (uncredited)
- 1946: I've Always Loved You (directed by Frank Borzage) - Neighbor (uncredited)
- 1946: That Brennan Girl - Photographer (uncredited)
- 1947: The Devil Thumbs a Ride - Belton Duncan (uncredited)
- 1947: Violence - Martin - United Defenders Committee Man (uncredited)
- 1947: The Secret Life of Walter Mitty) (directed by Norman Z. McLeod) - Director (uncredited) (final film role)
