= Road to Alcatraz =

1945 film by Nick Grinde

- Theatrical release poster
- Directed by: Nick Grinde
- Screenplay by: Dwight V. Babcock; Jerry Sackheim
- Story by: Francis K. Allan
- Produced by: Sidney Picker
- Starring: Robert Lowery; June Storey; Grant Withers; Clarence Kolb; Charles Gordon; William Forrest
- Cinematography: Ernest Miller
- Edited by: Richard L. Van Enger
- Production company: Republic Pictures
- Distributed by: Republic Pictures
- Release date: July 4, 1945 (New York)
- Running time: 60 minutes
- Country: United States
- Language: English

Road to Alcatraz is a 1945 American mystery film directed by Nick Grinde and written by Dwight V. Babcock and Jerry Sackheim. The film stars Robert Lowery, June Storey, Grant Withers, Clarence Kolb, Charles Gordon and William Forrest. It was released in July 1945 by Republic Pictures.

== Plot ==
Young lawyer John Norton receives a telegram from old fraternity brother Gary Payne that informs him that an old investment has now turned profitable. Norton's wife Kit does not trust Payne, but they retire for the evening after a short discussion. The next morning, Norton has a bump on his head, and there is mysterious evidence that something is amiss. Showing signs of amnesia, Norton heads to his law partner Charles Cantrell's house, only to find evidence that he had murdered Cantrell. Police detective Inspector Craven suspects that there is more to the events than just Norton's memory loss. Eventually Norton confronts Payne, is shot, and the police arrive in time to save Norton and arrest Payne.

== Cast ==
- Robert Lowery as John Norton
- June Storey as Kit Norton
- Grant Withers as Inspector Craven
- Clarence Kolb as Philip Angreet
- Charles Gordon as Gary Payne
- William Forrest as Charles Cantrell
- Iris Adrian as Louise Rogers
- Lillian Bronson as Dorothy Stone
- Harry Depp as House Manager
- Kenne Duncan as Servant

== Reception ==
A review in the Brooklyn Eagle called Road to Alcatraz a "murder mystery with a clever new twist".
