= Dance Hall (1941 film) =

1941 film by Irving Pichel

- Theatrical release poster
- Directed by: Irving Pichel
- Screenplay by: Stanley Rauh; Ethel Hill
- Produced by: Sol M. Wurtzel
- Starring: Carole Landis; Cesar Romero; William "Bill" Henry; June Storey; J. Edward Bromberg; Charles Halton
- Cinematography: Lucien N. Andriot
- Edited by: Louis R. Loeffler
- Music by: Emil Newman
- Production company: 20th Century Fox
- Distributed by: 20th Century Fox
- Release date: July 18, 1941
- Running time: 72 minutes
- Country: United States
- Language: English

Dance Hall is a 1941 American comedy film directed by Irving Pichel and written by Stanley Rauh and Ethel Hill. The film stars Carole Landis, Cesar Romero, William "Bill" Henry, June Storey, J. Edward Bromberg and Charles Halton. It is based on the novel The Giant Swing by W. R. Burnett. The film was released on July 18, 1941, by 20th Century Fox.

== Synopsis ==
Singer Lili Brown is attracted to dance hall manager Duke until she realizes that he is a ladies man. Nice guy Duke matches her with composer Joe Brooks.

== Cast ==
- Carole Landis as Lily Brown
- Cesar Romero as Duke McKay
- William "Bill" Henry as Joe Brooks
- June Storey as Ada
- J. Edward Bromberg as Max Brandon
- Charles Halton as Mr. Frederick Newmeyer
- Shimen Ruskin as Charles 'Limpy' Larkin
- William Haade as Moon
- Trudi Marsdon as Vivian
- Russ Clark as Cook
- Frank Fanning as Turnkey
