= Colorado Sunset =

1939 film by George Sherman

- Theatrical release poster
- Directed by: George Sherman
- Screenplay by: Betty Burbridge; Stanley Roberts
- Story by: Luci Ward; Jack Natteford
- Produced by: Harry Grey (uncredited)
- Starring: Gene Autry; Smiley Burnette; June Storey
- Cinematography: William Nobles
- Edited by: Lester Orlebeck
- Music by: Raoul Kraushaar (supervisor)
- Production company: Republic Pictures
- Distributed by: Republic Pictures
- Release date: July 31, 1939 (U.S.)
- Running time: 65 minutes
- Country: United States
- Language: English

Colorado Sunset is a 1939 American Western film directed by George Sherman and starring Gene Autry, Smiley Burnette, and June Storey. Written by Betty Burbridge and Stanley Roberts, based on a story by Luci Ward and Jack Natteford, the film is about a singing cowboy and his buddies who discover that the ranch they bought is really a dairy farm—and worse, it's subject to intimidation from a protection racket that prevents dairy products from safely reaching the market.

== Plot ==
Tired of traveling around the country performing their music, singing cowboy Gene Autry (Gene Autry) and his Texas Troubadors decide to purchase a cattle ranch and settle down. When they arrive at the ranch purchased for them by Frog Millhouse (Smiley Burnette), they cannot believe that the herd consists of milkcows rather than the cattle they had anticipated.

Soon they find themselves in the middle of a dairy war in which various farmers' trucks are being hijacked and destroyed in an attempt to drive them out of business. The town veterinarian, Dr. Rodney Blair (Robert Barrat), suggests that the Hall Trucking Company is behind the raids and proposes the establishment of a protective association. No one suspects that Blair and deputy sheriff Dave Haines (Buster Crabbe) are in fact the real masterminds behind the sabotage. When Gene vetoes Blair's idea of a protective association, the doctor directs his men to attack Gene's ranch, sending a secret code over the radio station owned by Haines's unsuspecting sister Carol (June Storey).

During the raid, Gene captures Clanton (Jack Ingram), one of Blair's men, and turns him over to Sheriff George Glenn (William Farnum). Soon after, Blair arrives at the jail, kills the sheriff, and frees his henchman. Suspecting that Blair and Haines are involved in the raids, Gene accepts decides to run for sheriff against Haines, and he wins. Gene then convinces the ranchers to contract with the Hall Trucking Company. When he discovers Blair's secret radio messages, he tricks Dr. Blair and his men into an ambush in which the milk trucks are overturned, and the hijackers are caught. Gene and his men emerge victorious in the dairy war.

== Cast ==
- Gene Autry as Gene Autry
- Smiley Burnette as Frog Millhouse
- June Storey as Carol Haines
- Barbara Pepper as Ginger Bixby
- Buster Crabbe as Dave Haines
- Robert Barrat as Dr. Rodney Blair
- Patsy Montana as Patsy
- The Texas Rangers as Texas Troubadors
- Purnell Pratt as Mr. Hall
- William Farnum as Sheriff George Glenn
- Kermit Maynard as Cyrus Drake
- Jack Ingram as Henchman Clanton
- Elmo Lincoln as Dairyman Burns
- Frankie Marvin as Ranch Hand
- Slim Whitaker as Exploding Cigar Recipient (uncredited)
- Champion as Gene's Horse (uncredited)

== Production ==
=== Stuntwork ===
- Joe Yrigoyen (Gene's double)
- Jack Kirk (Smiley's double)
- Jimmy Van Horn
- Clem Fuller
- Vernon Harrington
- Jack Shannon
- Ted Wells
- Willard Willingham
- Buell Bryant
- Nick Nichols
- Bill Yrigoyen

=== Filming locations ===
- Keen Camp, State Highway 74, Mountain Center, San Jacinto Mountains, California, USA
- Corriganville, Ray Corrigan Ranch, Simi Valley, California, USA
- Morrison Ranch
- Garner Ranch, Mountain Center, California, USA

=== Soundtrack ===
- "Colorado Sunset" (Con Conrad, L. Wolfe Gilbert) by Gene Autry, June Storey, and Cowboys at the end
- "On the Merry Old Way Back Home" (Walter G. Samuels) by Gene Autry, Smiley Burnette, and The Texas Rangers
- "Cowboys Don't Milk Cows" (Smiley Burnette) by Smiley Burnette and The Texas Rangers
- "I Want to Be a Cowboy's Sweetheart" (Patsy Montana) by Patsy Montana and The Texas Rangers
- "Poor Little Dogie" (Gene Autry, Johnny Marvin, Fred Rose) by Gene Autry (guitar and vocal)
- "Beautiful Isle of Somewhere" (John S. Fearis, Jessie B. Pounds) by Gene Autry and Townsfolk at the funeral
- "Autry's the Man – Vote for Autry" by Smiley Burnette and The Texas Rangers during electioneering
- "Autry's the Man – Vote for Autry" (Reprise) by Smiley Burnette and townsfolk after the election
- "Seven Years with the Wrong Woman" (Bob Miller) by Gene Autry (guitar and vocal)
