= Connie Lee =

American screenwriter (born 1918)

- Born: 1918
- Other names: Constance Lee, Connie Lee Bennett
- Occupations: Screenwriter, songwriter
- Years active: 1936–1953
- Spouse: Seymour Bennett

Connie Lee (born 1918) was an American screenwriter and songwriter known for her work on the Blondie films, as well as a number of B-Westerns (one of few women working in the genre at the time).

== Biography ==
Lee came out of the Tin Pan Alley school of songwriting, and was given a contract by Ambassador Pictures to write songs for a few of its films. By the time she was 19, she began writing screenplays; her first feature, Swing It, Professor, was released in 1937. She often collaborated on scripts with Karen DeWolf: As a duo, the two penned Nine Girls and many of the Blondie titles.

Lee married screenwriter Seymour Bennett (born Seymour Berkowitz) at some point in the early 1950s; the pair collaborated on the story for 1953's The Last Posse.

In 1953, Lee's and Bennett's careers came to an end when they were named by fellow screenwriter David Lang (30 November 1913 — 11 May 2007). and were placed on the Hollywood blacklist for alleged Communist ties.

== Screenwriting credits ==
- Ma and Pa Kettle at Waikiki (1953) (credited as Connie Lee Bennett)
- The Last Posse (1952) (credited as Connie Lee Bennett)
- The Lady from Texas (story) 1951) (credited as Connie Lee Bennett)
- The Return of October (story) (1948)
- Blondie's Holiday (1947)
- Blondie's Big Moment (1947)
- Blondie's Lucky Day (1946)
- Life with Blondie (1945)
- Leave It to Blondie (1945)
- Footlight Glamour (1943)
- It's a Great Life (1943)
- The Daring Young Man (1942)
- Blondie for Victory (1942)
- Blondie's Blessed Event (1942)
- Zis Boom Bah (1941) (story)
- Ride, Tenderfoot, Ride (1940) (story)
- Carolina Moon (1940) (story)
- Ghost Valley Raiders (1940) (story)
- Rancho Grande (1940) (story)
- Mountain Rhythm (1939) (story)
- Mexicali Rose (1939) (story)
- Swing It, Professor (1937) (story)
