= Mexicali Rose (1939 film) =

1939 film by George Sherman

- Theatrical release poster
- Directed by: George Sherman
- Screenplay by: Gerald Geraghty
- Story by: Luci Ward; Connie Lee
- Produced by: Harry Grey (associate)
- Starring: Gene Autry; Smiley Burnette; Noah Beery Sr.
- Cinematography: William Nobles
- Edited by: Tony Martinelli
- Music by: Raoul Kraushaar (supervisor)
- Production company: Republic Pictures
- Distributed by: Republic Pictures
- Release date: March 27, 1939 (U.S.)
- Running time: 59 minutes
- Country: United States
- Language: English

Mexicali Rose is a 1939 American Western film directed by George Sherman and starring Gene Autry, Smiley Burnette, and Noah Beery. Based on a story by Luci Ward and Connie Lee, the film is about a singing cowboy who fights corrupt oil men selling worthless stock from a non-existent well located on land belonging to a poor Mexican orphanage.

== Plot ==
While singing on a radio program sponsored by Alta Vista Oil Company, Gene Autry meets a beautiful woman, Anita Loredo, when her sweater gets caught on his outfit. Forced to stand with him at the microphone while he sings, Anita smiles sweetly at the singing cowboy whose romantic words are directed at her. After the show, Gene learns that Anita helps run an orphanage in Mexico with her uncle, Padre Dominic. She is upset that the orphanage has yet to see any return on their investment in the oil company—money badly needed to help the children. After confronting the head of the oil company, Carruthers, Gene realizes that his employers are crooked oil promoters trying to peddle the land on which the poor Mexican orphanage is located.

Gene quits his job and travels down to Mexico to investigate. Along the way he meets a Mexican bandit named Valdez who, with Gene's influence, comes to see himself as a modern-day Robin Hood. At the orphanage, Gene is reunited with Anita and meets her uncle. The padre tells Gene that he leased the land to Carruthers on a royalty basis and that the company has no plans of drilling, content making money by selling worthless shares in a non-existent well. Without the royalties, the orphanage will soon go bankrupt.

At a fundraising dance held at the orphanage, Gene sings a romantic song to Anita. Valdez arrives and in keeping with his Robin Hood role, "encourages" those present to contribute to the donation box. Meanwhile, Carruthers' men arrive and kidnap Alta Vista's lead engineer Blythe, who intended to spill the beans on the company's scheme. Gene and Frog chase after them and rescue Blythe who confirms that there is oil in the area.

Gene comes up with a plan to get Carruthers to start drilling. After identifying the land most likely to contain oil, Gene, his sidekick, Frog Millhouse, and Valdez plant oil in the area, upriver from the oil company office. Later, when Carruthers tastes oil in the drinking water, he and his men track the source of the oil and build a derrick on the site, just as Gene had planned. As construction is completed, however, Carruthers learns of Gene's ruse and abandons the well.

Trusting that the site will produce oil, Gene convinces the investors to buy up the rest of Carruthers' stock and drill. When Carruthers learns that there really is oil on the land and that his men have sold all his holdings, he begins a campaign of sabotage hoping to buy back the stock. When two orphans go missing, Gene tracks them to a cabin where Carruthers and his men are holed up. In the ensuing fight, Gene is captured but soon escapes when Valdez arrives on the scene. The orphans are rescued thanks to the heroic efforts of Valdez who sacrifices his life to save the children and dies like a true Robin Hood. As the well comes in, Gene remembers Valdez saying, "He was a true friend."

== Cast ==
- Gene Autry as Gene Autry
- Smiley Burnette as Frog Millhouse
- Noah Beery as Valdez
- Luana Walters as Anita Loredo
- William Farnum as Padre Dominic
- William Royle as Carruthers
- LeRoy Mason as Blythe
- Wally Albright as Tommy Romero
- Kathryn Frye as Chalita Romero
- Roy Barcroft as 'Mac' McElroy
- Dick Botiller as Manuel, Valdez Rider
- Vic Demourelle as Hollister
- John Beach as Henchman Brown
- Henry Otho as The Alcade
- Champion as Gene's Horse (uncredited)

== Production ==
=== Stuntwork ===
- Ken Cooper (Gene's double)
- Jack Kirk (Smiley's double)
- Hal Wills
- George DeNormand
- Eddie Parker
- Bill Yrigoyen
- Joe Yrigoyen

=== Filming locations ===
- Corriganville Movie Ranch, Simi Valley, California, USA
- Monogram Ranch, 24715 Oak Creek Avenue, Newhall, California, USA
- Victorville, California, USA

=== Soundtrack ===
- "Mexicali Rose" (Jack Tenney, Helen Stone) by Gene Autry at the radio station
- "Mexicali Rose" (Jack Tenney, Helen Stone) by Gene Autry for the bandits
- "Robin Hood" by Gene Autry (vocal and guitar)
- "Chiapanecas" (Traditional) by the festival band as dance music
- "You're the Only Star in My Blue Heaven" (Gene Autry) by Gene Autry (vocal and guitar) at the festival
- "My Orchestra's Driving Me Crazy" by Smiley Burnette at the festival
- "Allá en el Rancho Grande" (Emilio D. Uranga, Jorge del Moral and Silvano Ramos, Bartley Costello) by Gene Autry, Smiley Burnette, Noah Beery, Dick Botiller and other bandits
