= In Old Monterey =

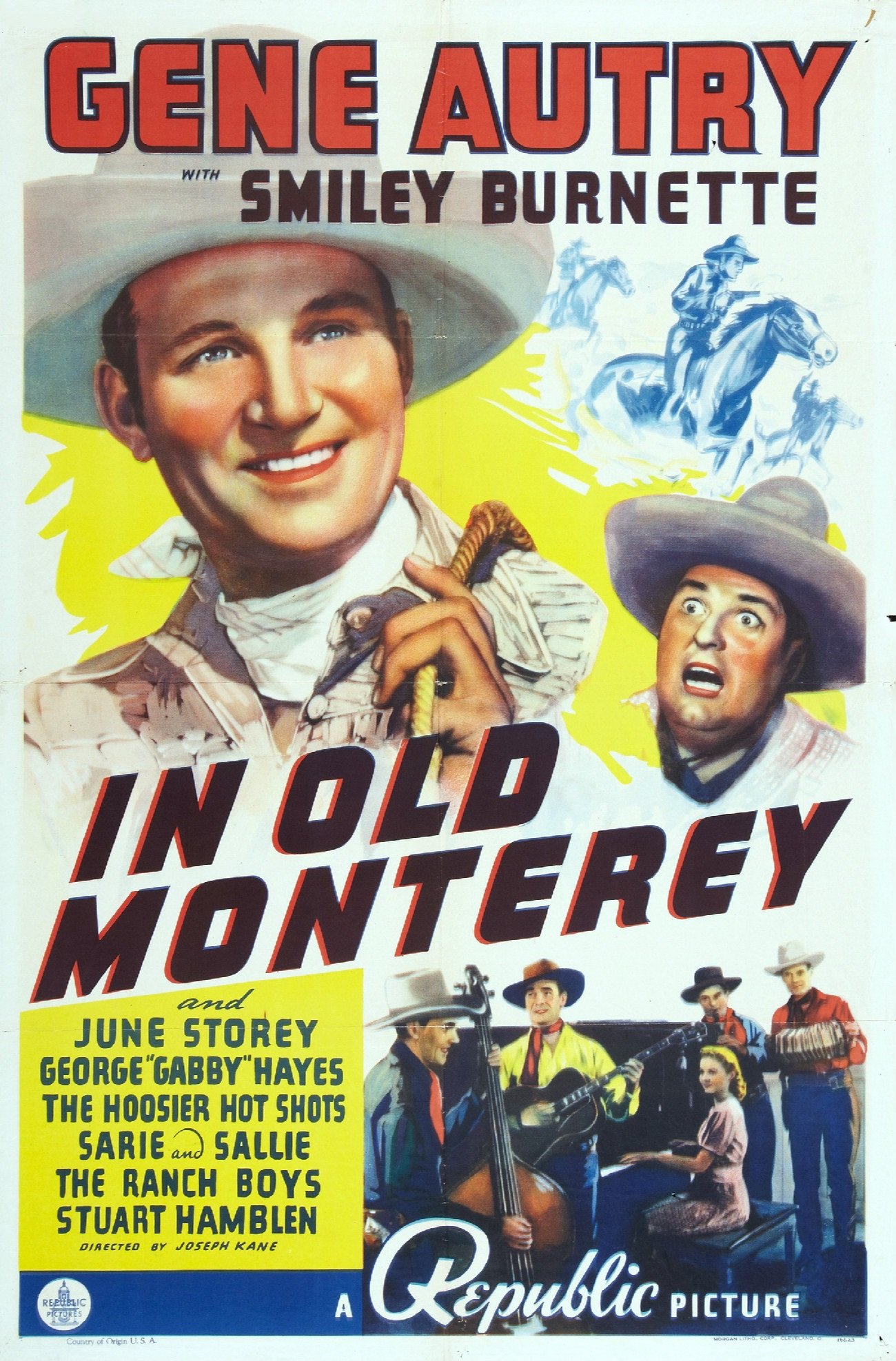
- Theatrical release poster
- Directed by: Joseph Kane
- Screenplay by: Gerald Geraghty; Dorrell McGowan; Stuart E. McGowan
- Story by: Gerald Geraghty; George Sherman
- Produced by: Armand Schaefer (associate)
- Starring: Gene Autry; Smiley Burnette; June Storey
- Cinematography: Ernest Miller
- Edited by: Edward Mann
- Music by: Raoul Kraushaar (musical director)
- Production company: Republic Pictures
- Distributed by: Republic Pictures
- Release date: August 14, 1939 (USA)
- Running time: 73 minutes
- Country: United States
- Language: English

In Old Monterey is a 1939 American Western film directed by Joseph Kane and starring Gene Autry, Smiley Burnette, and June Storey. Based on a story by Gerald Geraghty and George Sherman, the film is about an army sergeant and former rancher who runs into opposition from local ranchers when the United States Army sends him to purchase their ranch land needed for a strategic air base.

== Plot ==
The United States Army sends Sergeant Gene Autry (Gene Autry), a rancher in civilian life, to negotiate the purchase of ranch land out West needed to build a strategic air base. Local ranchers, led by Gabby Whittaker (George "Gabby" Hayes), refuse to sell their land to the government.

After some investigation, Gene suspects that the ranchers' refusal to sell their land may be influenced by borax mine magnate Stevenson (Jonathan Hale), who wants more money than the government is offering for his Atlas Borax Mine. To prevent ranchers from selling their land to the army, Stevenson and his men embark upon a plan of sabotage that makes it appear that the army fliers are employing ruthless tactics to force the ranchers into selling.

Influenced by Stevenson's covert agitation, the ranchers are driven to armed resistance when Gabby's nephew Jimmy (Billy Lee) is killed in an explosion caused by Stevenson. As the ranchers prepare to barricade the town, Gene rides to the rescue with proof that Stevenson was responsible for the explosion and the sabotage. Angered by the treachery, the ranchers, led by Gene in an armored truck, ride to the Atlas Borax Mine and bring Stevenson and his gang to justice.

== Cast ==
- Gene Autry as Gene Autry
- Smiley Burnette as Frog Millhouse
- June Storey as Jill Whittaker
- George "Gabby" Hayes as Gabby Whittaker
- The Hoosier Hot Shots as Soldier Musicians
- Sarie and Sallie as Themselves
- The Ranch Boys as Singing Cowhands
- Stuart Hamblen as Bugler
- Billy Lee as Jimmy Whittaker
- Jonathan Hale as Stevenson, Owner of the Atlas Borax Mine
- Robert Warwick as Major Clifford V. Forbes
- William Hall as Gilman, Mine Foreman
- Eddie Conrad as Club Marine Owner
- Champion as Gene's Horse (uncredited)

== Production ==
=== Stuntwork ===
Stuntwork for the film was performed by Joe Yrigoyen (Gene's double), Jack Kirk (Smiley's double), Nellie Walker, Henry Morris, Jack Long, Tom Steele, Bill Yrigoyen, Wally West, Art Dillard, Jay Wilsey, Carey Loftin, Charles Thomas, Duke York, George Allen, Eddie Parker, and Bert LeBaron.

=== Filming locations ===
In Old Monterey was filmed on location in the Alabama Hills, Lone Pine, California, Kernville, railroad tracks at Castaic Junction and Piru, the Big T Plant of Consumers Rock and Gravel Co. (Borax plant) at San Fernando Blvd. and Dexter, and Lasky Mesa in Calabasas.

=== Soundtrack ===
- "It Happened in Monterey" (Mabel Wayne, Billy Rose) by Gene Autry during the opening credits and at the end
- "Born in the Saddle" (Gene Autry, Johnny Marvin) by Gene Autry
- "My Buddy" (Walter Donaldson, Gus Kahn) by Gene Autry and The Hoosier Hotshots
- "It Looks Like Rain" by Smiley Burnette and The Hoosier Hotshots
- "Tumbling Tumbleweeds" (Bob Nolan) by Gene Autry and The Ranch Boys
- "Little Pardner" (Gene Autry, Johnny Marvin, Fred Rose) by Gene Autry
- "Virginia Blues" (Fred Meinken, Ernie Erdman) by The Hoosier Hotshots
- "Columbia, the Gem of the Ocean" (David T. Shaw) by Gene Autry, George 'Gabby' Hayes and Townsmen
- "The Vacant Chair (We Shall Meet But We Shall Miss Him)" (George Frederick Root, Henry S. Washburn) by Gene Autry and June Storey in church, with organ accompaniment
- "Colors" by a bugler when the flag is lowered
- "Taps" (Daniel Butterfield) by a bugler for lights out
- "You're in the Army Now" (Traditional) variations played often in the score

== Memorable quotes ==
- Sergeant Gene Autry: We need places where our men can train and our equipment can be tested over and over again until every flaw can be found and corrected. And I don't believe any of you are such poor Americans that you won't be proud to do your part.
