= Criminals of the Air =

1937 film by Charles C. Coleman

- Theatrical film poster
- Directed by: Charles C. Coleman
- Screenplay by: Owen Francis (Screenplay)
- Story by: Jack Cooper (Story)
- Produced by: Irving Briskin
- Starring: Rosalind Keith; Charles Quigley; Rita Hayworth
- Cinematography: George Meehan
- Edited by: Dick Fantl
- Music by: Morris Stoloff
- Production company: Columbia Pictures
- Distributed by: Columbia Pictures Corp. of California, Ltd.
- Release date: April 30, 1937
- Running time: 61 minutes
- Country: USA
- Language: English

Criminals of the Air (aka Guardians of the Air and Honeymoon Pilot) is a 1937 American action film, directed by Charles C. Coleman. It stars Rosalind Keith, Charles Quigley and Rita Hayworth. The film marked "Rita Hayworth"'s first onscreen credit; the actress, born Margarita Carmen Cansino, had previously used the stage name "Rita Cansino" or was uncredited in her prior 17 film appearances. (Note: After the preview of Criminals of the Air, she changed her name and the release print notes "Rita Hayworth".)

== Plot ==
In the border town of Hernandez, New Mexico, undercover agent Mark Owens (Charles Quigley) is assigned to help the United States Border Patrol break up a well-organized band of smugglers. Hernandez also has a reputation for "quick marriages", just across the border in Mexico, so Mark soon signs on as a pilot on "The Honeymoon Express."

"Hot Cake Joe" (Herbert Heywood), who runs a sandwich stand, is an informant for the smugglers and recognizes Mark is a "G-Man". Reporter Nancy Rawlings (Rosalind Keith), looking for a good story, wants to feature Mark as the pilot of the marriage service, but he is very reluctant to be photographed. She begins to suspect that flying is only a cover for smuggling. When Nancy sees him accepting money from cafe owner Kurt Feldon (Russell Hicks), whom she is sure is the head of the smugglers, her suspicions are confirmed. When Joe tells Feldon that Mark is an undercover government agent, he orders "Blast" Reardon (Marc Lawrence), one of his gang, to kill Mark and arranges for Mark to fly "Blast" and his girlfriend to Mexico to get married. Hoping to catch the smugglers in the act, Nancy hides in Mark's aircraft but, along with Mark, is captured when the aircraft is forced to land at the smugglers' hideout, the same place that Mark had photographed from the air earlier.

Nancy's editor becomes worried when she does not show up at the newspaper and calls the Border Patrol, who send a rescue team using Mark's aerial photographs of the hideout. Nancy and Mark manage to escape in his aircraft, but are quickly followed by "Blast". The Border Patrol intercept "Blast" and shoot him down in an aerial dogfight. The smugglers attempt to make a getaway by car, but are also intercepted and gunned down by the Border Patrol. After realizing that they are attracted to each other, Mark and Nancy decide to get married.

== Cast ==
- Rosalind Keith as Nancy Rawlings
- Charles Quigley as Mark Owens
- Rita Hayworth as Rita Owens
- John Gallaudet as Ray Patterson
- Marc Lawrence as "Blast" Reardon
- Patricia Farr as Mamie
- John Hamilton as Captain Wallace
- Ralph Byrd as Williamson
- Walter Soderling as "Camera-eye" Condon
- Russell Hicks as Kurt Feldon
- John Tyrrell as Bill Morris
- Lester Dorr as "Trigger"
- Herbert Heywood as "Hot Cake Joe"

== Production ==
Principal photography for Criminals of the Air took place from February 8–25, 1937. "The Honeymoon Express" in the film was an obvious reference to the air service provided by Paul Mantz, noted for flying for Hollywood films. (Note: The Lockheed Vega NC48M owned by Paul Mantz was popularly known as the "Honeymoon Express".) Mantz called his charter airline, Paul Mantz Air Services, based at United Airport in Burbank, California, offering a "discretion assured" flight to Yuma, Arizona, Las Vegas and Reno, Nevada (Reno was the then "honeymoon capital" of the United States).

== Critical reception ==
In 1937, Variety gave a lukewarm review and said the film was "fairly satisfying" as the second of a double feature. It described Rita Hayworth, then relatively unknown, as "charming and voluptuous" and while commenting on the effectiveness of her dancing scene, added, "she seems to have possibilities for straight talking roles."

More recently, The New York Times film reviewer Hal Erickson noted, "Columbia's 'Criminals of the Air' is another entry in the "alien-smuggling" movie cycle—and as such includes the obligatory scene in which the airborne smugglers escape detection by pulling a lever and disposing of their human cargo."
