= Ladies of Washington =

1944 film by Louis King

- Directed by: Louis King
- Written by: Wanda Tuchock; Snag Werris
- Produced by: William Girard
- Starring: Trudy Marshall; Ronald Graham; Anthony Quinn; Sheila Ryan
- Cinematography: Charles G. Clarke
- Edited by: Nick DeMaggio
- Music by: Cyril J. Mockridge
- Production company: Twentieth Century Fox
- Distributed by: Twentieth Century Fox
- Release date: May 25, 1944
- Running time: 61 minutes
- Country: United States
- Language: English

Ladies of Washington is a 1944 American drama film directed by Louis King and starring Trudy Marshall, Ronald Graham and Anthony Quinn.

The film's sets were designed by the art directors James Basevi and Leland Fuller.

== Plot ==
A group of young women are employed by the federal government in wartime Washington D.C. and one of whom becomes involved with an enemy agent.

== Cast ==
- Trudy Marshall as Carol Northrup
- Ronald Graham as Dr. Hugh Mayberry
- Anthony Quinn as Michael Romanescue
- Sheila Ryan as Jerry Dailey
- Robert Bailey as Dr. Stephen Craig
- Beverly Whitney as Helen
- Jackie Paley as Adelaide
- Carleton G. Young as Federal Investigator
- John Philliber as Mother Henry
- Robin Raymond as Vicky O'Reilly
- Doris Merrick as Susan
- Lela Bliss as Taxi Passenger
- Barbara Booth as Betty
- Charles D. Brown as Inspector Saunders
- Lucile Browne as Taxi Passenger
- Walter Clinton as Waiter
- Ruby Dandridge as Nellie
- Jo-Carroll Dennison as Frieda
- Harry Depp as Mr. Wethering
- Herbert Evans as Night Club Patron
- Mary Field as Nurse's Aide
- Bess Flowers as Woman Seeking Taxi
- Byron Foulger as Desk Clerk
- Inna Gest as Dorothy
- Jody Gilbert as Nurse's Aide
- Jane Hale as Minor Role
- Edna Mae Jones as Amy
- Rosalind Keith as Nurse
- J. Farrell MacDonald as Night Watchman
- Bert McClay as Ensign
- Sue Moore as Taxi Driver
- George N. Neise as Radio Commentator
- Lillian Porter as Marjorie
- Cyril Ring as Crane's Secretary
- Harry Shannon as Police Lt. Lake
- Lee Shumway as Police Sgt. Martin
- Larry Thompson as Federal Agent
- Robert Tiernan as Clerk
- Tom Tyler as Federal Agent
- John Wald as Radio Commentator
- Nella Walker as Mrs. Crane
- Pierre Watkin as Dr. John Crane
- Claire Whitney as Taxi Passenger

== Bibliography ==
- Rowan, Terry. World War II Goes to the Movies & Television Guide: Volume II.
