= End of the Road (1944 film) =

- Theatrical release poster
- Directed by: George Blair
- Screenplay by: Denison Clift; Gertrude Walker; Albert Beich
- Produced by: George Blair
- Starring: Edward Norris; John Abbott; June Storey; Jonathan Hale; Pierre Watkin; Ted Hecht
- Cinematography: William Bradford
- Edited by: Arthur Roberts
- Music by: Joseph Dubin
- Production company: Republic Pictures
- Distributed by: Republic Pictures
- Release date: November 10, 1944
- Running time: 51 minutes
- Country: United States
- Language: English

End of the Road is a 1944 American crime film directed by George Blair and written by Denison Clift, Gertrude Walker and Albert Beich. The film stars Edward Norris, John Abbott, June Storey, Jonathan Hale, Pierre Watkin and Ted Hecht. The film was released on November 10, 1944, by Republic Pictures.

== Cast ==
- Edward Norris as Robert Kirby
- John Abbott as Chris Martin
- June Storey as Kitty McDougal
- Jonathan Hale as Gregory McCune
- Pierre Watkin as District Attorney
- Ted Hecht as Walter Gribbon
- Kenne Duncan as Al Herman
- Eddie Fields as Joe Ferrari
- Ferris Taylor as Drake
- Emmett Vogan as Mannenburg
- Charles Williams as Jordan
- Edward Van Sloan as Judge
