= Russell Hicks =

American actor (1895–1957)

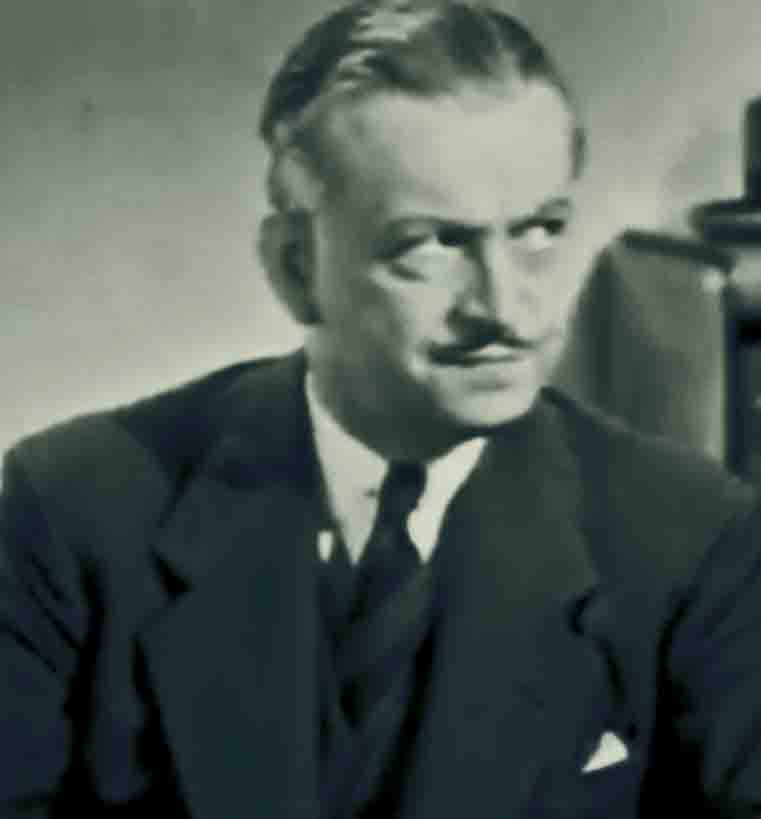
- Russell Hicks in Fit for a King (1937)
- Born: Edward Russell Hicks; June 4, 1895; Baltimore, Maryland, U.S.
- Died: June 1, 1957 (aged 61); Los Angeles, California, U.S.
- Occupation: Actor
- Years active: 1933–1956

Edward Russell Hicks (June 4, 1895 – June 1, 1957) was an American film character actor. Hicks was born in 1895 in Baltimore, Maryland. During World War I, he served in the U.S. Army in France. He later became a lieutenant colonel in the California State Guard.

Hicks was a character actor appearing in bit parts and small supporting roles in nearly 300 films between 1933 and 1956 (in 1937, he appeared in 25 films). He was often cast as a smooth-talking confidence man, or swindler, as in the W.C. Fields comedy classic The Bank Dick (1940). Hicks played a variety of judges, attorneys, corrupt officials and crooked businessmen in a variety of mediums until shortly before his death in 1957. Hicks appeared once in the syndicated western television series The Cisco Kid.

Broadway plays in which Hicks acted included The Caine Mutiny Court-Martial (1954), On Borrowed Time (1953), Time for Elizabeth (1948), All the King's Horses (1934), The Little Black Book (1932), Nona (1932), Torch Song (1930), Goin' Home (1928), No Trespassing (1926), and The Wisecrackers (1925).

On June 1, 1957, Hicks, aged 61, was involved in an automobile accident and suffered a heart attack afterward; he died on route to Santa Monica Receiving Hospital.

== Filmography ==
- The Birth of a Nation (1915) as Minor Role (film debut) (uncredited)
- Intolerance (1916) as Extra (uncredited)
- Before Morning (1933) as James Nichols
- Enlighten Thy Daughter (1934) as Daniel Stevens
- The Case of the Howling Dog (1934) as Clinton Foley
- Happiness Ahead (1934) as Jim Meehan
- The St. Louis Kid (1934) as Gorman (uncredited)
- The Firebird (1934) as Mr. Beyer – the Stage Manager
- Gentlemen Are Born (1934) as Newspaper Editor
- Babbitt (1934) as Commissioner Lyle Gurnee
- Murder in the Clouds (1934) as Taggart
- The Secret Bride (1934) as John F. Holdstock
- Devil Dogs of the Air (1935) as Captain
- The Woman in Red (1935) as Clayton – Defense Attorney
- Sweet Music (1935) as The Mayor
- Living on Velvet (1935) as Major
- While the Patient Slept (1935) as Dr. Jay
- Cardinal Richelieu (1935) as Le Moyne
- Go Into Your Dance (1935) as Sam Rupert (uncredited)
- $10 Raise (1935) as Hendricks (uncredited)
- Ladies Crave Excitement (1935) as Bert Taylor
- Honeymoon Limited (1935) as Slug Gorman / Sugar Carver
- Lady Tubbs (1935) as Mr. Ronald Ash-Orcutt
- Dante's Inferno (1935) as Prosecuting Attorney (uncredited)
- Ladies Love Danger (1935) as Melvin
- Thunder in the Night (1935) as Prefect of Police
- Charlie Chan in Shanghai (1935) as James Andrews
- 1,000 Dollars a Minute (1935) as Sonny Rycross
- Grand Exit (1935) as Drake (uncredited)
- Millions in the Air (1935) as Davis
- If You Could Only Cook (1935) as Dillon (uncredited)
- Two in the Dark (1936) as McCord – Police Officer (uncredited)
- Tough Guy (1936) as Corbin (uncredited)
- Rose Marie (1936) as Commandant (uncredited)
- Follow the Fleet (1936) as Jim Nolan
- The Music Goes 'Round (1936) as Mr. Cohn (uncredited)
- Laughing Irish Eyes (1936) as Silk Taylor
- Woman Trap (1936) as Dodd
- Special Investigator (1936) as Insp. Perkett
- Fatal Lady (1936) as American Opera House Manager (uncredited)
- Hearts in Bondage (1936) as Sen. Pillsbury
- Trapped by Television (1936) as J.F. Howland – Board Member (uncredited)
- Ticket to Paradise (1936) as Colton
- Bunker Bean (1936) as A.C. Jones
- Spendthrift (1936) as Attorney (uncredited)
- Grand Jury (1936) as Jim Hanify
- Straight from the Shoulder (1936) as Capt. Daniels (uncredited)
- The General Died at Dawn (1936) as American with No Matches (uncredited)
- Sea Spoilers (1936) as Phil Morgan
- 15 Maiden Lane (1936) as Judge Graham
- The Accusing Finger (1936) as Senator Forrest
- Laughing at Trouble (1936) as Cyrus Hall
- Dodge City Trail (1936) as Kenyon Phillips
- We Who Are About to Die (1937) as District Attorney Knight (uncredited)
- Secret Valley (1937) as Austin Martin
- Girl Overboard (1937) as Sam Le Maire
- Espionage (1937) as Alfred Hartrix (uncredited)
- 23 1/2 Hours' Leave (1937) as Capt. Barker
- Maytime (1937) as Monsieur Bulliet (uncredited)
- Midnight Taxi (1937) as Barney Flagg
- King of Gamblers (1937) as Man at Temple's Table (uncredited)
- Let Them Live (1937) as Newspaper Editor (uncredited)
- Criminals of the Air (1937) as Kurt Feldon
- It Happened Out West (1937) as Cooley
- Pick a Star (1937) as Mr. Stone
- Fifty Roads to Town (1937) as Police Official
- The Wildcatter (1937) as Tom Frayne
- On Again-Off Again (1937) as George Dilwig
- A Dangerous Adventure (1937) as Allen
- The Toast of New York (1937) as Lawyer
- The Big Shot (1937) as Martin Drake
- The Man Who Cried Wolf (1937) as Prosecuting Attorney (uncredited)
- Fit for a King (1937) as Editor Hardwick
- Partners in Crime (1937) as Mayor Callahan
- The Westland Case (1937) as Mr. Woodbury
- Clipped Wings (1937) as Capt. Morton
- Wise Girl (1937) as David Larrimore (uncredited)
- In Old Chicago (1938) as Politician in Jack's Office
- The Big Broadcast of 1938 (1938) as Capt. Stafford
- Kidnapped (1938) as Bailiff
- Men with Wings (1938) as Gen. Marlin (uncredited)
- Little Miss Broadway (1938) as Perry
- Gateway (1938) as Ernest Porter
- You Can't Take It with You (1938) as Attorney to Kirby (uncredited)
- Fugitives for a Night (1938) as Maurice Tenwright
- That Certain Age (1938) as Scout Leader (uncredited)
- Kentucky (1938) as Thad Goodwin Sr. – 1861
- North of Shanghai (1939) as Rowley
- Boy Trouble (1939) as Magistrate
- Boy Slaves (1939) as Albee's Attorney (uncredited)
- Honolulu (1939) as Mr. Clifford Jones (uncredited)
- The Three Musketeers (1939) as Porthos
- I Was a Convict (1939) as District Attorney
- The Story of Vernon and Irene Castle (1939) as Colonel (uncredited)
- The Story of Alexander Graham Bell (1939) as Mr. Barrows
- East Side of Heaven (1939) as Hinkle (uncredited)
- Hotel Imperial (1939) as Austrian Officer (uncredited)
- Union Pacific (1939) as Sergeant (uncredited)
- Man of Conquest (1939) as Mr. Allen (uncredited)
- Hotel for Women (1939) as Van Ellis (uncredited)
- Stanley and Livingstone (1939) as Commissioner
- Our Leading Citizen (1939) as Chairman (uncredited)
- The Real Glory (1939) as Capt. George Manning
- Rio (1939) as Banker (uncredited)
- Hollywood Cavalcade (1939) as Roberts
- Bad Little Angel (1939) as Maj. Ellwood – Newspaper Owner (uncredited)
- Rulers of the Sea (1939) as Mr. Cunard (uncredited)
- Joe and Ethel Turp Call on the President (1939) as Mr. Graves
- The Honeymoon's Over (1939) as J.P. Walker
- The Big Guy (1939) as Lawson
- Swanee River (1939) as Andrew McDowell
- The Blue Bird (1940) as Daddy Tyl
- Parole Fixer (1940) as U.S. District Court Judge
- Johnny Apollo (1940) as District Attorney
- Virginia City (1940) as John Armistead
- Enemy Agent (1940) as Lyman Scott
- Earthbound (1940) as Prosecutor
- The Mortal Storm (1940) as Rector
- Queen of the Mob (1940) as Judge (uncredited)
- Sporting Blood (1940) as 'Sneak' OBrien
- The Return of Frank James (1940) as Prosecutor
- Junior G-Men (1940, Serial) as Col. Barton
- Fugitive from a Prison Camp (1940) as Minor Role (uncredited)
- Nobody's Children (1940) as Sen. Lawrence Hargrave (uncredited)
- Seven Sinners (1940) as First Governor
- East of the River (1940) as Warden
- The Bank Dick (1940) as J. Frothingham Waterbury
- Lady with Red Hair (1940) Wealthy London Host (uncredited)
- A Night at Earl Carroll's (1940) as Mayor Jones of Hollywood
- No, No, Nanette (1940) as 'Hutch' Hutchinson
- Santa Fe Trail (1940) as Dr. J. Boyce Russell (uncredited)
- Love Thy Neighbor (1940) as Mr. Harrington
- Arkansas Judge (1941) as John Root – Attorney
- Western Union (1941) as Governor
- The Strawberry Blonde (1941) as Treadway – Hugo's Lawyer (uncredited)
- A Man Betrayed (1941) as C.R. Pringle
- Ellery Queen's Penthouse Mystery (1941) as Walsh
- Here Comes Happiness (1941) as John Vance
- The Man Who Lost Himself (1941) as Mr. Van der Girt
- Man Made Monster (1941) as Prison Warden Harris (uncredited)
- The Great Lie (1941) as Col. Harriston
- Blood and Sand (1941) as Marquis
- The Big Store (1941) as Arthur Hastings
- Sergeant York (1941) as General (uncredited)
- The Parson of Panamint (1941) as Prosecuting Attorney
- Hold That Ghost (1941) as Bannister
- Dive Bomber (1941) as Admiral – Speaks at Final Awards (uncredited)
- The Little Foxes (1941) as William Marshall
- The Pittsburgh Kid (1941) (uncredited)
- Doctors Don't Tell (1941) as Supt. Duff
- Unexpected Uncle (1941) as Tony (uncredited)
- Buy Me That Town (1941) as Malcolm
- Great Guns (1941) as Gen. Burns
- Public Enemies (1941) as Tregar
- They Died with Their Boots On (1941) as Colonel of 1st Michigan (uncredited)
- Pacific Blackout (1941) as Commanding Officer
- Sealed Lips (1942) as Dr. Charles Evans
- Ride 'Em Cowboy (1942) as Rodeo Announcer #1 (uncredited)
- We Were Dancing (1942) as Mr. Bryce-Carew
- Joe Smith, American (1942) as Mr. Edgerton
- Butch Minds the Baby (1942) as J. Wadsworth Carrington
- To the Shores of Tripoli (1942) as Maj. Wilson
- Ship Ahoy (1942) as Capt. C.V. O'Brien (uncredited)
- Fingers at the Window (1942) as Dr. Chandley
- Pacific Rendezvous (1942) as John Carter
- Tarzan's New York Adventure (1942) as Judge Abbotson
- Lady in a Jam (1942) as Carter
- Wings for the Eagle (1942) as Committee Speaker (uncredited)
- Blondie for Victory (1942) as Colonel (uncredited)
- King of the Mounties (1942, Serial) as Marshal Carleton
- Springtime in the Rockies (1942) as Man in Dark with Lighter (uncredited)
- Hitler – Dead or Alive (1942) as Samuel Thornton
- Strictly in the Groove (1942) as R.C. Saunders
- Behind the Eight Ball (1942) as Harry B. Kemp
- Tennessee Johnson (1942) as Lincoln's Emissary
- Harrigan's Kid (1943) as Col. Lowry
- Air Raid Wardens (1943) as Maj. Scanlon
- King of the Cowboys (1943) as Texas Governor Shuville
- Follow the Band (1943) as Jeremiah K. Barton
- Three Hearts for Julia (1943) as Army Colonel (uncredited)
- Someone to Remember (1943) as Mr. Stanton
- Northern Pursuit (1943) as Chief Inspector (uncredited)
- His Butler's Sister (1943) as Sanderson
- There's Something About a Soldier (1943) as Mr. Edwards (uncredited)
- What a Woman! (1943) as Sutton (uncredited)
- The Woman of the Town (1943) as Publisher
- Captain America (1944, Serial) as Randolph
- Hat Check Honey (1944) as J.J. Worthington
- Bathing Beauty (1944) as Mr. Allenwood (uncredited)
- Louisiana Hayride (1944) as H.C. Forbes
- Janie (1944) as Col. Lucas – Commander Camp Wingate
- The Port of 40 Thieves (1944) as Charles Farrington
- The Captain from Köpenick (1945) as Police Commissioner
- She Gets Her Man (1945) as Mayor
- A Guy, a Gal and a Pal (1945) as General (uncredited)
- The Master Key (1945, Serial) as Police Chief Michael J. O'Brien
- The Valley of Decision (1945) as Mr. Laurence Gaylord
- Flame of Barbary Coast (1945) as Cyrus Danver
- First Yank Into Tokyo (1945) as Col. Thompson (uncredited)
- Apology for Murder (1945) as Harvey Kirkland
- That Night with You (1945) as Henry Brock (uncredited)
- A Game of Death (1945) as Mr. Whitney
- She Wouldn't Say Yes (1945) as Mr. Lindsay – Patient (uncredited)
- Getting Gertie's Garter (1945) as Board Member (uncredited)
- Scarlet Street (1945) as J.J. Hogarth
- A Close Call for Boston Blackie (1946) as Harcourt (uncredited)
- Gay Blades (1946) as Buxton
- The Bandit of Sherwood Forest (1946) as Robin Hood – Earl of Huntington
- Swing Parade of 1946 (1946) as Daniel Warren Sr.
- The Hoodlum Saint (1946) as Marty Martindale (uncredited)
- Dark Alibi (1946) as Warden Cameron
- The Unknown (1946) as Col. Wetherford (uncredited)
- G.I. War Brides (1946) as Insp. Ramsaye
- Earl Carroll Sketchbook (1946) as John Hawks (uncredited)
- The Bachelor's Daughters (1946) as John Llewelyn Dillon
- Plainsman and the Lady (1946) as Sen. Gwin
- Till the Clouds Roll By (1946) as Producer (uncredited)
- The Show-Off (1946) as Mr. Thorbison (uncredited)
- The Pilgrim Lady (1947) as Thackery Gibbs
- The Beginning or the End (1947) as General (uncredited)
- The Sea of Grass (1947) as Maj. Dell Harney
- Buck Privates Come Home (1947) as Mr. Appleby
- Fun on a Weekend (1947) as John Biddle
- Web of Danger (1947) as Mr. Gallagher
- Dark Delusion (1947) as Mr. Logan – Patient (uncredited)
- Smoky River Serenade (1947) as J. Bricket Armstrong
- Variety Girl (1947) as Man at Steambath (uncredited)
- Exposed (1947) as Col. William K. Bentry
- Louisiana (1947) as Fred Astor
- The Fabulous Texan (1947) as Gen. Sheridan (uncredited)
- The Judge Steps Out (1948) as Superior Court Judge (uncredited)
- The Mating of Millie (1948) as Kirkland (uncredited)
- The Black Arrow (1948) as Sir Harry Shelton
- The Noose Hangs High (1948) as Johnny – Copper Club Manager (uncredited)
- The Hunted (1948) as Dan Meredith – Chief of Detectives
- Silver River (1948) as Edwards (uncredited)
- Assigned to Danger (1948) as Thomas A. Rivers (uncredited)
- The Gallant Legion (1948) as Satate Senator Beale
- Race Street (1948) as Easy Mason
- Shanghai Chest (1948) as Dist. Atty. Frank Bronson
- The Velvet Touch (1948) as Judge Brack / Actor in 'Hedda Gabler': Judge Brack
- The Return of October (1948) as Taylor (uncredited)
- The Plunderers (1948) as Cavalry Colonel
- My Dear Secretary (1948) as Dick Fulton – Publisher (uncredited)
- Jiggs and Maggie in Court (1948) as Supreme Court Judge
- One Sunday Afternoon (1948) as Tredway – Barnstead's Attorney (uncredited)
- South of St. Louis (1949) as Col. Kirby (uncredited)
- I Cheated the Law (1949) as District Attorney Randolph
- Manhattan Angel (1949) as J.C. Rayland
- The Fountainhead (1949) as Banner Board Member (uncredited)
- Barbary Pirate (1949) as Commodore Preble
- Samson and Delilah (1949) as Lord of Ashkelon
- Malaya (1949) as Businessman with Cigar (uncredited)
- The Flying Saucer (1950) as Intelligence Chief Hank Thorn
- Blue Grass of Kentucky (1950) as James B. Armistead
- Unmasked (1950) as George Richards – District Attorney
- Square Dance Katy (1950) as Commissioner
- The Big Hangover (1950) as Steve Hughes
- Duchess of Idaho (1950) as Contest Judge (uncredited)
- The Petty Girl (1950) as Tycoon (uncredited)
- Again Pioneers (1950) as Pete Galloway
- The Du Pont Story (1950) as Businessman (uncredited)
- Bowery Battalion (1951) as Col. Melvin Hatfield
- Belle Le Grand (1951) as Exchange Chairman (uncredited)
- Fourteen Hours (1951) as Regan, Hotel Manager (uncredited)
- Kentucky Jubilee (1951) as T.J. Hoarsely
- All That I Have (1951) as Jess Northrup
- As You Were (1951) as Col. Lockwood
- Crazy Over Horses (1951) as Randall
- Overland Telegraph (1951) as Col. Marvin
- Rodeo (1952) as Allen H. Grandstead (uncredited)
- Old Oklahoma Plains (1952) as Colonel Charles Bigelow
- Mr. Walkie Talkie (1952) as Col. Lockwood
- The Maverick (1952) as Col. Hook
- Man of Conflict (1953) as Mr. Murdock
- You Can't Run Away from It (1956) as Ship Captain (uncredited)
- 7th Cavalry (1956) as Col. Kellogg (final film)
- Once Upon a Honeymoon (1956, Short) as Angel Chief

== Selected television ==
Year	Title	Role	Notes
1950	Cisco Kid	Jasper King - Nancy's Uncle	Episode "False Marriage"
1953	Death Valley Days	Gov. Henry Foote	Episode "Whirlwind Courtship" (1953)
1956	Cheyenne	Col. Kilrain	Episode "West of the River"
