= June Storey =

Canadian-American actress (1918–1991)

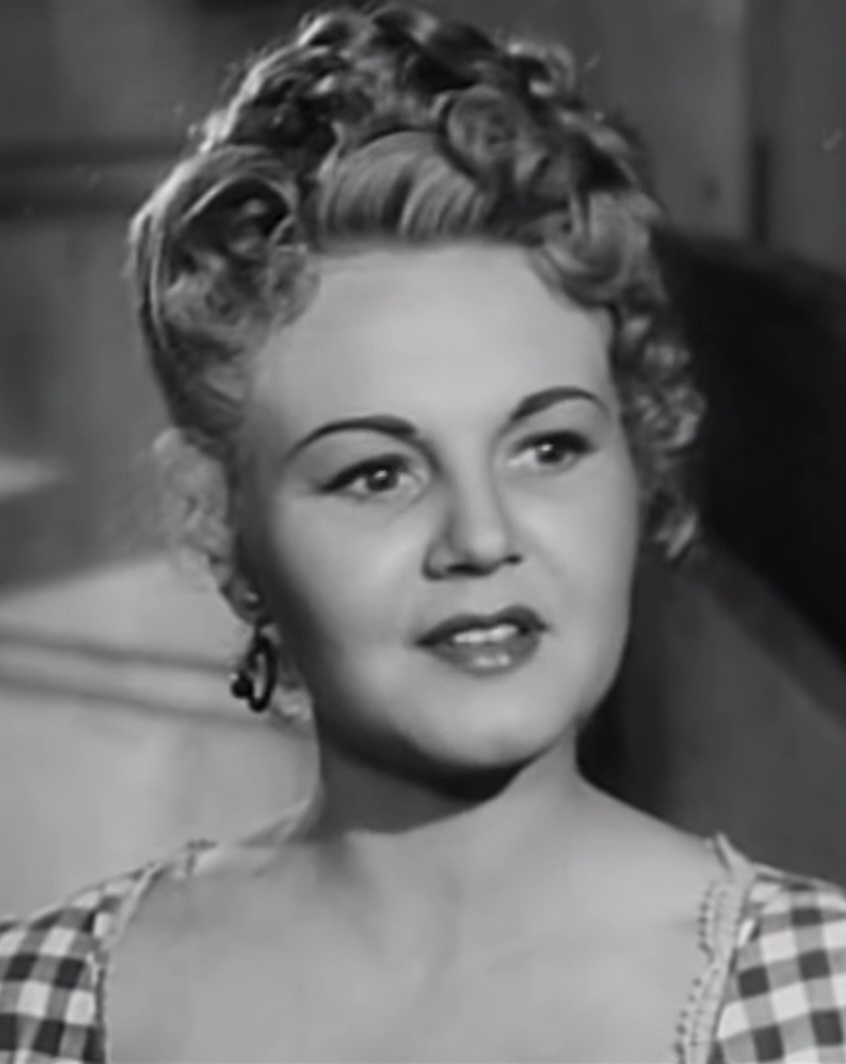
- Storey in The Strange Woman (1946)
- Born: Mary June Storey; April 20, 1918; Toronto, Ontario, Canada
- Died: December 18, 1991 (aged 73); Vista, California, U.S.
- Occupation: Actress
- Years active: 1934–1949
- Spouses: Fred Bohling (m. 1947; div. 1952) Nick Ostreyko (m. 1953, divorced) Lincoln Clark (m. 1979)
- Children: 2

Mary June Storey (April 20, 1918 – December 18, 1991) was a Canadian-born American film actress who appeared in 45 films during the 1930s and 1940s. She was leading lady to cowboy singer Gene Autry in 10 films.

== Early years ==
Storey was born on April 20, 1918, in Toronto, Ontario, Canada. Her father, William Storey, was a forest ranger; her mother was Lareta Storey. Her acting interests were evident early when, as a little girl, she put on shows in her family's backyard.

Her family moved to Tyler Lake, Connecticut, when she was five years old. She had a sister, Maxine, who became a "noted motion picture magazine feature writer."

After living in Connecticut and Long Island, New York, in 1930, her family moved to Southern California, where she attended Laguna Beach High School. She gained acting experience with the Laguna Beach Little Theater. Her first appearance on film was an uncredited role as a student in Student Tour (1933).

== Film ==
Pretty in her youth, Storey caught the attention of Fox Film Corporation when she auditioned with them to star in films. After being hired as a contract player by Fox, Storey studied acting with Florence Enright and took dancing lessons from Rita Hayworth's father, Eduardo Cansino. Storey, like Hayworth and other young actresses, participated in a "training school" operated by Fox. The school used one-act plays to develop the actors' talents.

In 1934, Storey made her first film appearance in Student Tour. In June 1935, Storey signed a seven-year contract with 20th Century Fox. Her first credited role was in the 1936 film Girls' Dormitory. In the next two years, she appeared in eight films, including In Old Chicago (1937), Island in the Sky (1938), Down in Arkansas (1938), and Orphans of the Street (1938). In 1938, she was approached by Sol Siegel from Republic Pictures and offered an audition for a leading lady role opposite cowboy star Gene Autry. Storey later recalled, "He asked me if I were interested in trying out for the part. I was athletic and could ride a horse, so I thought I would enjoy the role."

On April 21, 1939, the day after her 21st birthday, Storey became a contract player with Republic Pictures. In 1939 and 1940, she co-starred in ten Gene Autry films as his leading lady: Home on the Prairie, Blue Montana Skies, Mountain Rhythm, Colorado Sunset, In Old Monterey, South of the Border, Rancho Grande, Gaucho Serenade, Carolina Moon, and Ride, Tenderfoot, Ride. According to writer Hans J. Wollstein, Storey was the "perfect leading lady for Autry: very agreeable to look upon, competent as a performer by then, and willing to work long, hard hours on location". The actress Mary Lee often starred alongside her, playing the role of her younger sister. Her career slowed considerably when Autry left acting for a time to serve during World War II. After five additional films with Republic, her contract was terminated by mutual agreement.

From 1946 to 1949, Story appeared in minor roles in ten films, including The Strange Woman (1946) with Hedy Lamarr, Killer McCoy (1947) with Mickey Rooney, and The Snake Pit (1948) with Olivia de Havilland. Her last credited role was in the 1949 film Miss Mink of 1949.

== Personal life ==
Storey married businessman Fred Bohling. In 1947, they purchased a 450-acre ranch on the Rogue River in Oregon and had one son, Eric. In 1950, Storey was involved in a near-fatal auto accident involving a logging truck. She later recalled, "Through the care and inspiration I received from the doctors and nurses, I fully recovered. I grew quite a bit spiritually during this ordeal and developed a deep sense of commitment to help others." After she and Bohling divorced, Storey married her second husband, Nick Ostreyko. This marriage produced a daughter, Marina, but the marriage also ended in divorce.

Storey returned to California where she worked at a doctor's office in Laguna Beach, and later at a nursing home. After received her nursing degree, she became the nurse to the wife of engineer Lincoln Clark for ten years. In 1979, Storey married Lincoln Clark after his wife's death. She became a United States citizen, and devoted much of the remainder of her life to works of charity. During the 1980s, Storey attended several western film festivals. "It's a real tribute to the fans," she once observed, "who maintain an interest in this part of Americana. I'm happy I was part of it."

== Death ==
Storey died of cancer on December 18, 1991, in Vista, California, at the age of 73. She was buried in Pacific View Memorial Park in Corona del Mar.

== Filmography ==
- Student Tour (1934) - Student (uncredited)
- Girls' Dormitory (1936) - Greta
- Career Woman (1936) - Edith Clark
- Thin Ice (1937) - Member of Girls Band (uncredited)
- Love and Hisses (1937) - Minor Role (uncredited)
- In Old Chicago (1937) - Gretchen
- Happy Landing (1938) - Stewardess (uncredited)
- Island in the Sky (1938) - Lucy Rhodes
- Down in 'Arkansaw' (1938) - Mary Weaver
- Orphans of the Street (1938) - Lorna Ramsey
- Home on the Prairie (1939) - Martha Wheeler
- The Three Musketeers (1939) - Farm Girl (uncredited)
- Pardon Our Nerve (1939) - Check Room Girl (uncredited)
- Blue Montana Skies (1939) - Dorothy Hamilton
- Sorority House (1939) - Norma Hancock
- Mountain Rhythm (1939) - Alice
- Mickey the Kid (1939) - Sheila Roberts
- Colorado Sunset (1939) - Carol Haines
- In Old Monterey (1939) - Jill Whittaker
- First Love (1939) - Wilma van Everett
- South of the Border (1939) - Lois Martin
- Rancho Grande (1940) - Kay Dodge
- In Old Missouri (1940) - Mary
- Gaucho Serenade (1940) - Joyce Halloway
- Carolina Moon (1940) - Caroline Stanhope
- Ride, Tenderfoot, Ride (1940) - Ann Randolph
- Barnyard Follies (1940) - Louise Dale
- The Lone Wolf Takes a Chance (1941) - Gloria Foster
- Hello, Sucker (1941) - Trixie Medcalf
- Dance Hall (1941) - Ada
- Dangerous Lady (1941) - Phyllis Martindel
- Girls' Town (1942) - Myra Norman
- End of the Road (1944) - Kitty McDougal
- Road to Alcatraz (1945) - Kit Norton
- Song of the Prairie (1945) - Joan Wingate
- The Strange Woman (1946) - Lena Tempest
- Killer McCoy (1947) - Arlene the waitress
- Secret Service Investigator (1948) - Laura Deering Redfern
- Train to Alcatraz (1948) - Virginia Marley
- Miraculous Journey (1948) - Rene La Cour
- Cry of the City (1948) - Miss Boone (uncredited)
- The Snake Pit (1948) - Miss Bixby
- Trouble Preferred (1948) - Hilary Vincent
- Miss Mink of 1949 (1949) - Rose Pendelton
- Too Late for Tears (1949) - Fuller's Girl (uncredited)
