= Annapolis Farewell =

1935 film by Alexander Hall

- Theatrical release poster
- Directed by: Alexander Hall
- Screenplay by: Frank Craven; Jack Wagner
- Produced by: Louis D. Lighton
- Starring: Guy Standing; Rosalind Keith; Tom Brown; Richard Cromwell; John Howard; Benny Baker
- Cinematography: Ted Tetzlaff
- Edited by: Doane Harrison
- Music by: John Leipold
- Production company: Paramount Pictures
- Distributed by: Paramount Pictures
- Release date: August 23, 1935
- Running time: 75 minutes
- Country: United States
- Language: English

Annapolis Farewell is a 1935 American drama film directed by Alexander Hall and written by Frank Craven and Jack Wagner. The film stars Guy Standing, Rosalind Keith, Tom Brown, Richard Cromwell, John Howard and Benny Baker. The film was released on August 23, 1935, by Paramount Pictures.

== Cast ==
- Guy Standing as Cmdr. Fitzhugh
- Rosalind Keith as Madeline Deming
- Tom Brown as Morton 'Click' Haley
- Richard Cromwell as Boyce Avery
- John Howard as Duncan Haley
- Benny Baker as Zimmer
- Louise Beavers as Miranda
- Minor Watson as Cmmdre. Briggs
- Ben Alexander as Adams
- John Darrow as Porter
- William Collier Sr. as Rumboat Charlie
- Wheeler Oakman as Cmdr. Lawson
- Samuel S. Hinds as Dr. Bryant

== Reception ==
Frank Nugent of The New York Times said, "Filmed at Annapolis with—as the announcement proclaims — the "cheerful cooperation" of the academy, the photoplay's backgrounds are colorful. Besides Sir Guy, the other members of the cast are insignificant, but there are good performances by Tom Brown as the impudent middy, by John Howard (a comparative newcomer) as his elder brother, and Louise Beavers as Commander Fitzhugh's housekeeper. A complete summary would be that the film is extremely sentimental, familiar in pattern but exceedingly well-made for all that."
