= Find the Witness =

1937 film by David Selman

- Directed by: David Selman
- Written by: Grace Neville; Fred Niblo Jr.; Richard Sale
- Produced by: Ralph Cohn
- Starring: Charles Quigley; Henry Mollison; Rosalind Keith
- Cinematography: Virgil Miller
- Edited by: William A. Lyon
- Production company: Columbia Pictures
- Distributed by: Columbia Pictures
- Release date: January 8, 1937
- Running time: 55 minutes
- Country: United States
- Language: English

Find the Witness is a 1937 American drama film directed by David Selman and starring Charles Quigley, Henry Mollison and Rosalind Keith. It was produced and distributed by Columbia Pictures.

== Cast ==
- Charles Quigley as Larry McGill
- Henry Mollison as Rudolph Mordini
- Rosalind Keith as Linda Mason
- Rita La Roy as Rita Calmette
- Wade Boteler as Inspector Collins
- Ernie Alexander as Jerry
- Stanley Andrews as District Attorney
- William Arnold as Reporter
- Hooper Atchley as Carney
- Sven Hugo Borg as Diver
- Don Brodie as Reporter
- Ralph Byrd as Tex
- Nick Copeland as Manning
- Frank De Voe as Reporter
- Gladys Gale as Mrs. Rice
- Creighton Hale as Bell Captain
- Eddie Hart as Sailor
- Harry Harvey as Barker
- William Humphrey as Minister
- Charles King as Burton
- Ralph McCullough as Reporter
- Ted Oliver as Deagle
- Lee Shumway as Higgins
- Reginald Simpson as Clerk
- Harry Stafford as Judge
- John Tyrrell as Jackson
- Blanca Vischer as Spanish Waitress
- Frederick Vogeding as Larson
- Alyce Ardell as Louise
- Jimmy Conlin as Swifty Mullins
- Harry Depp as Dr. Rice
- Edward Earle as Mr. Quinn
- Charles C. Wilson as Charley Blair

== Bibliography ==
- Larry Langman & Daniel Finn. A Guide to American Crime Films of the Thirties. Greenwood Press, 1995.
