= Blue Montana Skies =

1939 film by B. Reeves Eason

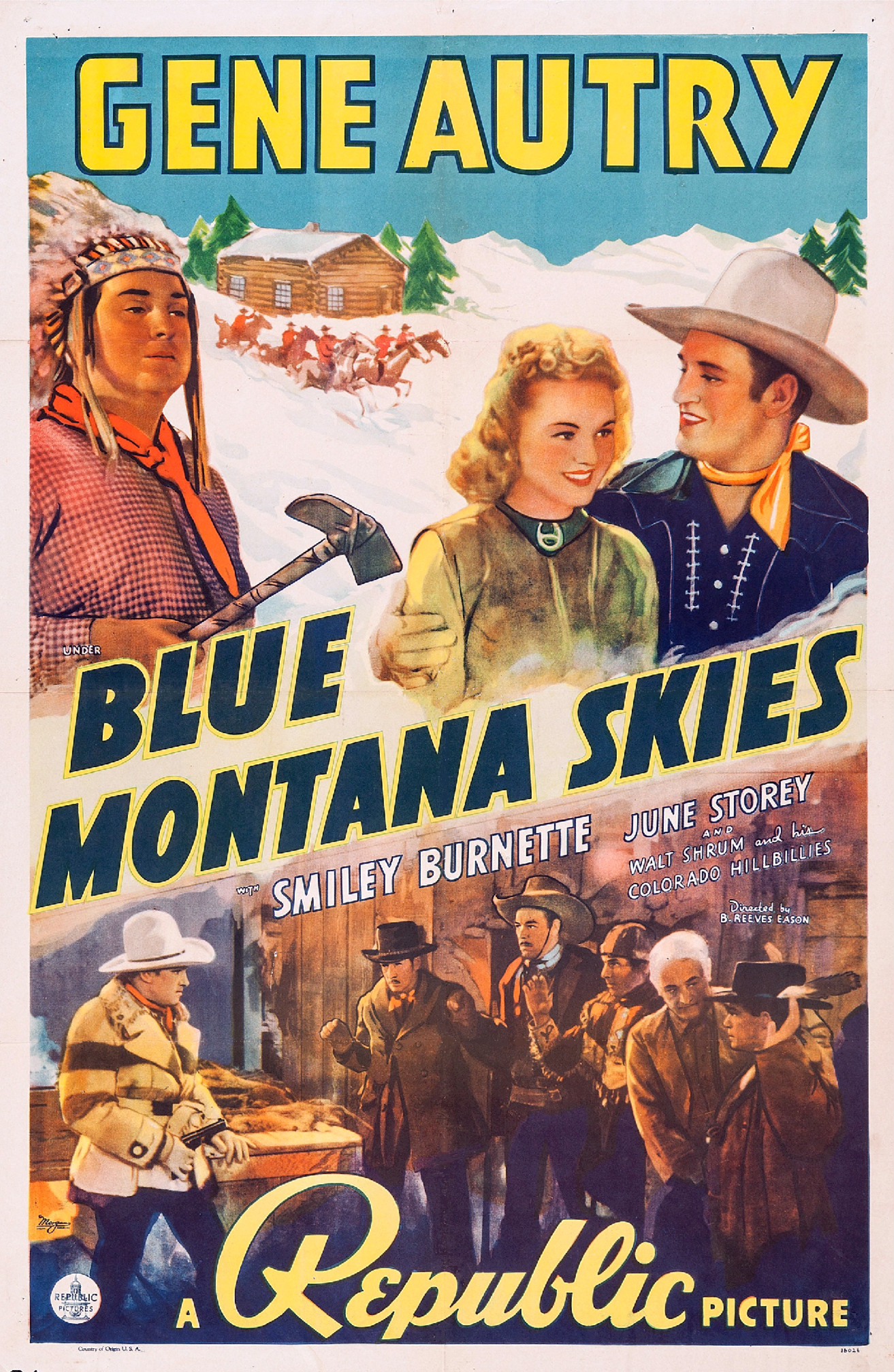
- Theatrical release poster
- Directed by: B. Reeves Eason
- Screenplay by: Gerald Geraghty
- Story by: Norman S. Hall; Paul Franklin
- Produced by: Harry Grey (associate)
- Starring: Gene Autry; Smiley Burnette; June Storey
- Cinematography: Jack A. Marta
- Edited by: Lester Orlebeck
- Music by: Raoul Kraushaar (supervisor)
- Production company: Republic Pictures
- Distributed by: Republic Pictures
- Release date: May 4, 1939 (US)
- Running time: 56 minutes
- Country: United States
- Language: English

Blue Montana Skies is a 1939 American Western film directed by B. Reeves Eason and starring Gene Autry, Smiley Burnette, and June Storey. Based on a story by Norman S. Hall and Paul Franklin, the film is about a singing cowboy who goes up against a gang of fur smugglers operating near the Canada–United States border.

== Plot ==
While driving a herd of cattle in northern Montana, cowboys Gene Autry (Gene Autry), Frog Millhouse (Smiley Burnette), and Steve (Tully Marshall) cross the border into Canada. Riding alone, Steve stumbles upon a convoy of fur smugglers who stab him and leave him to die in the woods. Before dying, he manages to scrawl the initials "HH".

After discovering the body of their murdered friend and his final cryptic clue, Gene and Frog ride to the nearby HH ranch, which is owned by Dorothy Hamilton (June Storey) and her partner, Hendricks (Harry Woods). Unknown to Dorothy, Hendricks is the head of the fur smuggling ring. Suspicious of Hendricks, Gene and Frog stampede their cattle into the HH herd as an excuse to spend time at the ranch and investigate. Soon they discover that the furs are being smuggled into a storehouse on the ranch and then shipped out of the country. While preparing to escort another shipment of pelts, the smugglers discover Gene and Frog in the storeroom and, deciding to use Gene as a cover for their illegal activities, hijack him and his wagon.

After the smugglers leave, Frog escapes from the storeroom and organizes a rescue party to search for Gene and his captors. As the smugglers hold up another warehouse of furs, Gene escapes and tries to prevent the robbery, but is shot in the arm. He manages to sound the alarm and then follows after the smugglers by dogsled. After catching up to the thieves, Gene sees them loading the furs into Hendricks' car. Gene causes a daring avalanche that traps the smugglers and exacts justice for the murder of his friend.

== Cast ==
- Gene Autry as Gene Autry
- Smiley Burnette as Frog Millhouse
- June Storey as Dorothy Hamilton
- Harry Woods as Hendricks
- Tully Marshall as Steve
- Al Bridge as Marshal
- Glenn Strange as Henchman Bob Causer
- Dorothy Granger as Mrs. Millie Potter
- Edmund Cobb as Eddie Brennan
- Robert Winkler as Wilbur Potter, the Boy
- Jack Ingram as Henchman Frazier
- Augie Gomez as Blackfeather
- John Beach as N.W. Mountie Corporal
- Walt Shrum and His Colorado Hillbillies as Musicians at Dance
- Champion as Gene's Horse (uncredited)

== Production ==
=== Filming locations ===
- Big Bear Lake, Big Bear Valley, San Bernardino National Forest, California, USA
- Lake Sherwood, Agoura Ranch
- Morrison Ranch

=== Soundtrack ===
- "Rockin' in the Saddle" (Gene Autry, Johnny Marvin, Fred Rose) by Gene Autry, Smiley Burnette, and cowboys
- "'Neath the Blue Montana Skies" (Gene Autry, Johnny Marvin, Fred Rose) by Gene Autry and cowboys
- "The Old Geezer" (Gene Autry, Johnny Marvin, Fred Rose) by Gene Autry, Smiley Burnette, and Dorothy Granger (piano)
- "Famous Men of the West" by Gene Autry and Walt Shrum and His Colorado Hillbillies
- "I Just Want You" (Gene Autry, Johnny Marvin, Fred Rose) by Gene Autry and Walt Shrum and His Colorado Hillbillies
