= Rosalind Keith =

American actress

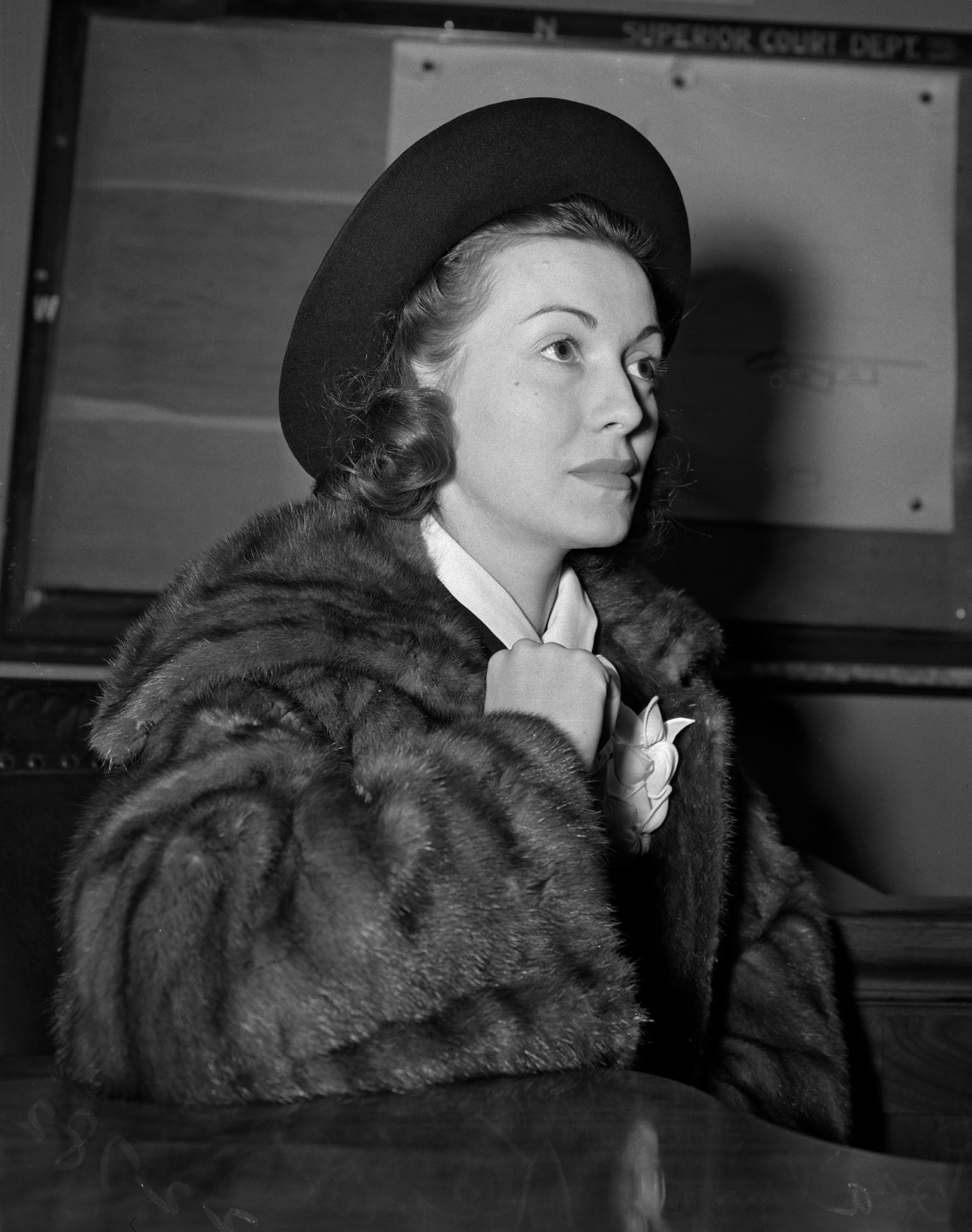
- Keith in court waiting to have a divorce granted from Willison Clarence Mellor, Los Angeles, 1940
- Born: December 6, 1916; Mascoutah, Illinois, U.S.
- Died: February 24, 2000 (aged 83); Glenwood, Arkansas, U.S.
- Occupation: Actress
- Years active: 1934–1944 (film)
- Spouse: Willison Clarence Mellor (?-1940)

Rosalind Keith (born Rosalind Culli; December 6, 1916 – February 24, 2000) was an American film actress.

Keith was born Rosalind Culli in Mascoutah, Illinois, the daughter of Rudolph and Hilda Culli. Her family moved to Belleville, Illinois, when she was young. She studied at the Kendall School of Expression in Belleville, continuing to do so after her family moved to St. Louis.

When Keith was 15 year old, she married artist James M. Lewis in St. Louis. She filed for divorce from him in 1935. She later married cameraman William Mellor in Boulder City, Nevada.

After making 18 films for Columbia and Paramount, she became a singer billed as Rosalind Courtright.

== Filmography ==
Year	Title	Role	Notes
1934	Romance in the Rain	Cinderella Girl	
1935	The Glass Key	Opal Madvig	
1935	Annapolis Farewell	Madeline Deming	
1935	Gentlemen of the Navy	Mary Jennings	
1936	Poppy	Frances Parker	
1936	King of the Royal Mounted	Helen Lawton - alias Helen Curtis	
1936	Theodora Goes Wild	Adelaide Perry	Uncredited
1937	Find the Witness	Linda Mason	
1937	Westbound Mail	Marion Saunders	
1937	Parole Racket	Betty Wilson	
1937	Motor Madness	Peggy McNeil	
1937	Criminals of the Air	Nancy Rawlings	
1937	A Fight to the Finish	Ellen Ames	
1937	A Dangerous Adventure	Linda Gale	
1937	Under Suspicion	Doris	
1937	Clipped Wings	Molly McGuire	
1937	Manhattan Shakedown	Gloria Stoner	
1938	Arson Gang Busters	Joan Lawrence	
1939	Trouble in Sundown	June Cameron	
1939	Bad Boy	Madelon Kirby	
1944	Ladies of Washington	Nurse	Uncredited, (final film role)

== Bibliography ==
- Larry Langman & Daniel Finn. A Guide to American Crime Films of the Thirties. Greenwood Press, 1995.
