= King of the Royal Mounted (film) =

1936 American drama film, directed by Howard Bretherton

- Theatrical release poster
- Directed by: Howard Bretherton
- Screenplay by: Earle Snell; Don Swift
- Based on: King of the Royal Mounted by Zane Grey
- Produced by: Sol Lesser
- Starring: Robert Kent; Rosalind Keith; Alan Dinehart; Arthur Loft; Grady Sutton; Frank McGlynn Sr.
- Cinematography: Harry Neumann
- Edited by: Robert O. Crandall
- Production company: Principal Productions
- Distributed by: 20th Century Fox
- Release date: September 11, 1936
- Running time: 61 minutes
- Country: United States
- Language: English

King of the Royal Mounted is a 1936 American drama film directed by Howard Bretherton and written by Earle Snell and Don Swift. The film stars Robert Kent, Rosalind Keith, Alan Dinehart, Arthur Loft, Grady Sutton and Frank McGlynn Sr. The film was released on September 11, 1936, by 20th Century Fox.

== Cast ==
- Robert Kent as RCMP Sgt. King
- Rosalind Keith as Helen Lawton
- Alan Dinehart as Frank Becker
- Arthur Loft as John Snead
- Grady Sutton as RCMP Const. Slim Callum
- Frank McGlynn Sr. as Henry Dundas
- Jack Luden as RCMP Const. Smith
- Lawrence Underwood as Charley
- Artie Ortego as Indian Joe
