= A Dangerous Adventure (1937 film) =

1937 film

- Film poster
- Directed by: D. Ross Lederman
- Written by: Owen Francis; Francis Rathmell; John Rathmell
- Starring: Don Terry; Rosalind Keith; Russell Hicks
- Cinematography: Benjamin H. Kline
- Edited by: Gene Havlick
- Production company: Columbia Pictures
- Distributed by: Columbia Pictures
- Release date: July 22, 1937
- Running time: 58 minutes
- Country: United States
- Language: English

A Dangerous Adventure is a 1937 American drama film directed by D. Ross Lederman and starring Don Terry, Rosalind Keith and Russell Hicks. It was produced and distributed by Columbia Pictures.

== Cast ==
- Don Terry as Tim Sawyer
- Rosalind Keith as Linda Gale
- Russell Hicks as Allen
- John Gallaudet as Hadley
- Nana Bryant as Marie
- Frank C. Wilson as Depan
- Marc Lawrence as Calkins
- Joe Sawyer as Dutch

== Critical reception ==
Harrison's Reports described the film as "an ordinary program melodrama" and commented that the "plot is so familiar that one knows in advance just what is going to happen."
