= Trouble in Sundown =

1939 US film directed by David Howard

- Directed by: David Howard; Sam Ruman (assistant)
- Screenplay by: Oliver Drake; Dorrell McGowan; Stuart McGowan
- Story by: Charles F. Royal
- Produced by: Bert Gilroy
- Starring: George O'Brien; Rosalind Keith; Ray Whitley; Chill Wills
- Cinematography: Harry Wild
- Edited by: Frederic Knudtson
- Music by: Roy Webb
- Production company: RKO Radio Pictures
- Release date: March 24, 1939 (US)
- Running time: 60 minutes
- Country: United States
- Language: English

Trouble in Sundown is a 1939 American Western film directed by David Howard, using a screenplay by Oliver Drake, Dorrell McGowan and Stuart McGowan, based on a story by Charles F. Royal.

Starring George O'Brien, Rosalind Keith, Ray Whitley, and Chill Wills, the film was produced and distributed by RKO Radio Pictures, released on March 24, 1939.

== Plot ==
In the Old West town of Sundown, a banker named Cameron is suspected of a robbery because he was the only person who knew the vault lock's combination. When a corrupt land owner, Ross Daggett, tries to exact vigilante justice, rancher Clint Bradford goes to the aid of June Cameron, the banker's daughter, and hides her father. Daggett and his men find Cameron and try to force him into writing a false suicide note admitting the robbery before they kill him. They are interrupted by Clint and a deputy sheriff, who is shot and killed by Daggett's henchmen. The sheriff suspects not only Cameron of the robbery and the deputy's murder, but also believes Clint and June are covering for him. Daggett calls a meeting of the bank's depositors, where a bank examiner closes the bank for sixty days after which Daggett, as receiver, will liquidate the bank's assets unless Cameron is brought to justice sooner. Clint investigates Tex and Dusty (Daggett's henchmen), and suspects Daggett was behind the bank's robbery. At Cameron's trial, Clint tricks Daggett into revealing the vault's combination, thus implicating Daggett and his gang. Clint proposes marriage to June by telling her to change the name on his bank accounts to "Mr. and Mrs. Bradford." They kiss implying June's acceptance of the proposal.

== Cast ==
- George O'Brien as Clint Bradford
- Rosalind Keith as June Cameron
- Chill Wills as Whopper
- Ward Bond as Dusty - Henchman
- Ray Whitley as Andy
- Cyrus Kendall as Daggett
- Howard C. Hickman as John Cameron
