= The Lone Wolf Takes a Chance =

1941 film directed by Sidney Salkow

- Directed by: Sidney Salkow
- Written by: Earl Felton; Sidney Salkow
- Produced by: Ralph Cohn
- Starring: Warren William; June Storey; Henry Wilcoxon; Eric Blore
- Cinematography: John Stumar
- Edited by: Viola Lawrence
- Music by: M. W. Stoloff
- Production company: Columbia Pictures
- Distributed by: Columbia Pictures
- Release date: March 6, 1941 (US)
- Running time: 73 minutes
- Country: United States
- Language: English

The Lone Wolf Takes a Chance is a 1941 American mystery film directed by Sidney Salkow and starring Warren William, June Storey and Henry Wilcoxon. Salkow also wrote the original screenplay, along with Earl Felton, and the film was released on March 6, 1941. It is the sixth Lone Wolf film produced by Columbia Pictures, and the fourth appearance of William as the title character the Lone Wolf. His next film was Secrets of the Lone Wolf, released later that year.

== Plot ==
One night in New York City, Michael Lanyard, aka the "Lone Wolf", and his valet Jamison spot a cat wearing a pearl necklace. They pursue the cat to a bank, which triggers bars that trap them. Inspector Crane, responding to the report of a jewelry store robbery nearby, is delighted to catch his nemesis at last. However, the appearance of the cat (the jewelry store's pet) deflates his dreams. Nonetheless, he bets Lanyard two months salary that he cannot stay out of trouble for 24 hours.

Lanyard is staying at the same hotel as movie star Gloria Foster. Johnny Baker, her fiancé, receives a telegram from her stating she has information about his invention. Baker is suspicious, but goes anyway. Wallace, a former private detective with him, waits down the hall. It is a trap; two men capture him. Wallace climbs out onto a narrow ledge to make his way toward the room. He bangs on Lanyard's bathroom window begging for help, but Lanyard thinks he is working for Crane. A crook hears and shoots Wallace; he falls to his death, taking Lanyard's shade pull cord with him. Lanyard sees the three men leave. He sends Jamison to tail them. Lanyard finds the discarded telegram, then flees. Crane arrives, and finding the pull cord missing from Lanyard's suite, suspects Lanyard of Wallace's murder.

Lanyard goes to see Foster. While waiting, he sees a newsreel that reveals that Baker's invention, a "burglar-proof" government mail car, will be used on its maiden trip to transport currency engraving plates to San Francisco, and that Baker is the only person who knows the combination to it. Jamison follows the kidnappers to the station, where Frank Jordan, his henchman and Johnny (in a stretcher) board the train, the same train transporting the mail car. Lanyard orders Jamison to get on, while he and Foster race to the next station.

Lanyard gets into the criminals' compartment and finds Baker tied up and gagged, guarded by Evelyn Jordan, but "Dr." Hilton returns and they end up outside, with the door closed. Mutual accusations ensue, but the conductor receives a message from Crane ordering him to hold Lanyard and Jamison. Lanyard asks another passenger with whom he had been speaking just before, Dr. Tupman, to examine the alleged patient. To Lanyard's surprise, Tupman confirms the man is gravely ill. While Lanyard and Jamison are kept under guard in their compartment, Tupman takes Foster prisoner and has Evelyn Jordan take her place. The crooks force Baker to open the mail car. When Crane takes custody of Lanyard and Jamison, Lanyard insists Foster can exonerate him, but Evelyn Jordan answers Crane's knocking. The thieves get off, taking Foster with them. Lanyard and Jamison escape.

They steal a taxi and chase after the crooks' ambulance, but with their lights off, they get stuck in a ditch. They set out on foot. They hear a woman's scream from an abandoned house. They rescue Foster. Lanyard sends her and Jamison to the authorities, while he continues searching. Crane arrives with Sheriff Haggerty and takes Lanyard into custody, but he still escapes. He finds a secret door to the crooks' lair, but is captured. He guesses from Baker's absence that they have locked him inside his own invention. They knock Lanyard out and run with the plates, but Jamison returns and sabotages the ambulance's engine. Tupman hides the plates, lowering them down a well in a bucket, then they all flee on foot.

Lanyard has Jamison repair the ambulance and they race to save Baker, but they do not know the combination, so Lanyard stops in defeat. Then he sees a sign for a theatre which mentions the latest newsreels. He heads to the theatre and gets the reel showing Baker entering the combination on screen. After enlargement, Lanyard can see it. They overtake the train using a chartered airplane. Lanyard sets a stop signal and boards. As the train reaches in Gary, Indiana, he finally opens the car and rescues Baker, just before the police start breaking in, triggering the poison gas.

== Cast ==
- Warren William as Michael Lanyard (The Lone Wolf)
- June Storey as Gloria Foster
- Henry Wilcoxon as Frank Jordan
- Eric Blore as Jamison
- Thurston Hall as Inspector Crane
- Don Beddoe as Sheriff Haggerty
- Evalyn Knapp as Evelyn Jordan
- Fred Kelsey as Dickens
- William Forrest as Vic Hilton
- Walter Kingsford as Dr. Hooper Tupman
- Lloyd Bridges as Johnny Baker
- Ben Taggart as Conductor
- Richard Fiske as Brakeman
- Regis Toomey as Wallace

== Bibliography ==
- Fetrow, Alan G. Feature Films, 1940-1949: a United States Filmography. McFarland, 1994.
