= The Last Posse =

1953 film by Alfred L. Werker

- Directed by: Alfred L. Werker
- Screenplay by: Seymour Bennett; Connie Lee Bennett; Kenneth Gamet
- Story by: Seymour Bennett; Connie Lee Bennett
- Produced by: Harry Joe Brown
- Starring: Broderick Crawford; John Derek; Charles Bickford; Wanda Hendrix
- Cinematography: Burnett Guffey
- Edited by: Gene Havlick
- Color process: Black and white
- Production company: Columbia Pictures
- Distributed by: Columbia Pictures
- Release date: July 4, 1953
- Running time: 73 minutes
- Country: United States
- Language: English

The Last Posse is a 1953 American Western film directed by Alfred L. Werker and starring Broderick Crawford, John Derek, Charles Bickford and Wanda Hendrix.

== Plot ==
When an anxiously awaited posse returns with neither prisoners nor the stolen money, flashbacks of three different characters, what took place. Having been cheated by Sampson Drune, Art Romer, his brother George and his son Art have robbed him and fled. A posse led by Drune took off after them and although unwanted, the town's drunken sheriff John Frazier joined them. John's influence on Jed Clayton, the adopted son of Drune, is the key to Jed later revealing who killed Drune, the robbers, and what happened to the money.

== Cast ==
- Broderick Crawford as Sheriff John Frazier
- John Derek as Jed Clayton
- Charles Bickford as Sampson Drune
- Wanda Hendrix as Deborah
- Warner Anderson as Robert Emerson
- Henry Hull as Ollie Stokely
- Will Wright as Todd Mitchell
- Tom Powers as Frank White
- Raymond Greenleaf as Arthur Hagan
- James Kirkwood as Judge Parker
- Eddy Waller as Dr. Pryor
- Skip Homeier as Art Romer
- James Bell as Will Romer
- Guy Wilkerson as George Romer

== Reception ==
FilmInk called it "interesting, complex, tough".
