= Clipped Wings (1937 film) =

- Theatrical poster
- Directed by: Stuart Paton
- Written by: Paul Willett
- Produced by: H. W. Kier
- Starring: Lloyd E. Hughes; Rosalind Keith; William Janney
- Cinematography: Harry Forbes; Elmer Dyer (aerial photography)
- Edited by: Ethel Davey
- Music by: Edward Kilenyi; Dr. Kalami (musical score)
- Production company: Kier Film Company
- Distributed by: Ace Pictures Company
- Release date: December 2, 1937; (Note: The film lists 1936 as the production date.)
- Running time: 63 minutes
- Country: United States
- Language: English

Clipped Wings is a 1937 American crime and aviation Kier-Phillips production for National pictures, directed by Stuart Paton from an original story and screenplay by Paul Willett. The film stars Lloyd E. Hughes, Rosalind Keith and William Janney.

== Plot ==
In World War I, Captain Jerry Broun (Lloyd Hughes) feels he has to fight even though the United States has not yet entered the conflict. He enrols in Canada to fly as a pilot, with his adoring young half-brother Mickey (Delmar Watson) wanting to follow in his footsteps by becoming a pilot.

Twenty years later, an older Michael (William Janney) attempts to enter the United States Army Air Corps (USAAC), but cannot overcome his boyhood fear of thunderstorms and is "washed out". (Note: In military parlance, being "washed-out" is the equivalent of being fired or dismissed.) His friend Cecil Dunbar (Glen Boles) persuades a dejected Michael to come to a party hosted by crippled war veteran Raoul McGuire (Jason Robards Sr.). Michael meets McGuire's sister, Molly (Rosalind Keith), who confides that her brother is engaged in criminal activities.

Michael's older brother, now in the U.S. Department of Justice and assuming the name "Jim Lofton", has protected his identity from his family and others, by circulating the cover story that he was killed in the war. Lofton's assignment is to arrest Raoul McGuire, his old flying buddy and the man who once saved his life. McGuire is smuggling oil across the Texas border and is fooled into believing Lofton is part of his gang.

Michael falls in love with Raoul's sister, Molly, but at the family ranch, overhears the gang's plans to smuggle oil. Jim Lofton's role is to fly and divert authorities when a military exercise is taking place at the ranch. When Moran (Richard Cramer) the gang leader, shoots and wounds Raoul, in a struggle with Lofton, the gang leader is killed.

When the gang involves both Molly and Michael, Lofton reveals his true identity to his brother. Michael overcomes his fears and flies Molly and her wounded brother to a hospital. Jerry Broun takes off in another aircraft to escort Michael, and after a furious gun battle in the air, crashes into the pursuing gangster's aircraft. He then parachutes to safety from his burning aircraft. With his brother recovering from his burns, Michael is reinstated in the USAAC and marries Molly.

== Cast ==
- Lloyd E. Hughes as Jerry Broun aka Captain Jim Lofton
- Rosalind Keith as Molly McGuire
- William Janney as Michael Broun
- George Regas as Fernando, Moran's Henchman
- Henry Otho as Sergeant Phalen
- Richard Cramer as Moran
- Jason Robards Sr. as Raoul McGuire
- Joseph W. Girard as Colonel A.C. Clayton, Flight Surgeon
- Glen Boles as Cecil Dunbar, Michael's pal
- Delmar Watson as Mickey Lofton, as a boy
- Ed Cassidy as Leif Baxter, Dispatcher
- Russell Hicks as Captain Morton
- Rosa Turich as Carla the McGuire Maid
- Frank Hagney as Terrell
- Larry Steers as Jones
- Earl Haley as Red Johnson

== Production ==
Clipped Wings featured massed aerial scenes with latest USAAC aircraft.

Clipped Wings featured a number of aerial scenes, with a mix of staged back screen projection work at the Los Angeles International Film Studios and stock footage from operational fighter squadrons. The use of Randolph Air Force Base, San Antonio, Texas, where training was taking place, allowed the production company to film a graduation ceremony as well as aircraft such as Boeing P-12 fighters in the air. A 1930 Waco INF (NC864V) and a 1931 Model 7 Fleet (NC798V) were used in the film by the hero and pursuing gangsters. The Fleet Model 7 still exists. Famed aerial photographer Elmer Dyer filmed the aerial action.

== Reception ==
Despite the abundant use of aerial sequences, Clipped Wings was a B film saddled by a muddled plot and hackneyed acting.

== Home media ==
It was later bundled in 2013 as a DVD release, with another B feature, Skybound (1935), also starring Lloyd Hughes.
