= Seymour Bennett =

American screenwriter (1915–1997)

- Born: Seymour Bennett Berkowitz; July 20, 1915; Brooklyn, New York, U.S.
- Died: March 9, 1997 (aged 81); California, U.S.
- Education: Cornell University
- Occupation: Screenwriter
- Spouse: Connie Lee

Seymour Bennett (July 20, 1915 – March 9, 1997) was an American screenwriter active during the 1940s and 1950s.

== Biography ==
Seymour was born in Brooklyn, New York, on July 20, 1915, the son of William Berkowitz and Jennie Romer. He attended Cornell University, where he wrote plays. He graduated in 1936.

Seymour enlisted in the United States Army in 1941, and listed his occupation at that time as a writer, reporter, and editor.

At some point after serving in World War II, he moved to Los Angeles and began writing film scenarios; his first effort was on 1947's Hemingway adaptation, The Macomber Affair.

In California, he met and married fellow writer Connie Lee, who wrote several of Westerns and B-movies for Columbia Pictures. They collaborated on the script for 1953's The Last Posse.

Bennett and Lee were both blacklisted as Communists during the 1950s after being named by screenwriter David Lang, at which point their careers in Hollywood came to an end.

Bennet died in California on March 9, 1997, at the age of 81.

== Selected filmography ==
- The Last Posse (1953)
- The Macomber Affair (1947)
