= Swing It, Professor =

1937 film directed by Marshall Neilan

- Directed by: Marshall Neilan; Henry Spitz
- Written by: Connie Lee (story); Nicholas T. Barrows; Robert St. Clare
- Produced by: Maurice Conn; William Berke
- Starring: Pinky Tomlin; Paula Stone; Milburn Stone
- Cinematography: Jack Greenhalgh
- Edited by: Richard G. Wray
- Music by: Connie Lee; Al Heath; Buddy LeRoux; Lou Leaman
- Production company: Conn-Ambassador
- Release date: 13 March 1937
- Running time: 62 minutes
- Country: United States
- Language: English

Swing It, Professor (also known as Swing It, Buddy) is an independently produced 1937 musical comedy directed by Marshall Neilan and starring Pinky Tomlin, Paula Stone and Milburn Stone. The musical numbers were written by Connie Lee, Al Heath and Buddy LeRoux, and was produced by Conn Productions, Inc. The film capitalised on the swing dance craze.

== Plot ==
At Brownell University’s College of Music, Dean Wiley (George Cleveland) and two trustees are trying to revamp the music department with faster music, the Gentlemaniacs make their only appearance in the film with their rendition of Brownell's new Victory Song, which does not meet with the dean's approval. The dean summons Professor Roberts (Pinky Tomlin) and he and two trustees ask him to add swing "in the spirit of the age", Roberts refuses which results in his resignation.

Unable to find a job, Roberts runs out of money and stumbles upon a group of musical hobos in the woods, complete with piano, who are singing opera. After the musical performance, the hobos are served a stew of some sort from a pot over a fire. Roberts gets in line, hoping for some food but is asked to prove he is really a musician, which he does. The next day Beaver (Ralph Peters), one of the hobos, takes Roberts under his wing and shows him how to beg for money by playing music at a spot on the street which happens to be near a swing club.

Lou Morgan (Milburn Stone) is trying to convince Teddy Ross (Paula Stone) to work at his "friend's" nightclub, which he actually owns. She agrees to think it over and puts her in a cab, dropping his wallet in the process. Roberts sees the occurrence and attempts to enter the swing club to return Morgan's wallet. After finally gaining entrance, Morgan "rewards Roberts by making him the manager of his new club, with the understanding that he pose as owner. Roberts, unaware that the club plays swing music, finally accepts.

Roberts sends for one of his students to come sing for the new nightclub, Joan Dennis (Mary Kornman), who shows up just prior to Randall (Bill Elliott), a local racketeer. Randall doesn't want Morgan moving in on his territory, but Morgan tells Randall that Roberts is the owner of the nightclub. Randall thinks "the Professor" is using an alias, and assumes he's a racketeer from Chicago, since Roberts is from Illinois. After doing some checking, Morgan and his gang discover there really is a racketeer named the Professor from Chicago.

Morgan throws a party for his gang, later Roberts and Joan leave a note for Morgan with his assistant, Toby Brickhead (Pat Gleason) saying they're going to visit Randall's nightclub. Randall tries to make "friends" with Roberts by offering him a large sum of money, Roberts is surprised and initially refuses, but after Randall offers him even more Roberts accepts.

Randall and his gang read in the newspaper that the underworld figure called the Professor is deported from Liverpool as Morgan and Joan leave to get married. Randall shows up at the nightclub in an effort to take over management. Beaver tells Roberts the only recourse they have is to get a mob and they don't have one, Roberts has another opinion on the matter. He steals a taxicab which results in a large number of taxicabs that follow Roberts to the nightclub. Roberts gets into a fistfight with Randall trying to free Teddy who has been held hostage by Randall, and Randall is knocked out just prior to the numerous taxi drivers entering the nightclub intent on finding the taxi thief. Beaver points to the still unconscious Randall and the taxi drivers say they are going to take him to jail.

== Cast ==
- Pinky Tomlin as Professor Artemis J. Roberts
- Paula Stone as Teddy Ross
- Milburn Stone as Lou Morgan
- Mary Kornman as Joan Dennis
- Bill Elliott as Randall (as Gordon Elliott)
- Pat Gleason as Toby Brickhead
- Ralph Peters as Beaver
- George Cleveland as Dean
- Harry Depp as Trustee
- Harry Semels as Angelo
- The Gentlemaniacs
- Paul (Mousie) Garner as Member of Gentlemaniacs
- Sam Wolfe as Member of Gentlemaniacs
- Richard Hakins as Member of Gentlemaniacs
- The Four Squires
- Lou Butterman as Member of the Four Squires
- Jack W. Smith as Member of the Four Squires
- Harry S. Powell as Member of the Four Squires
- Glen T. Moore as Member of the Four Squires
- The Four Singing Tramps
- Tom Clark as Member of Singing Tramps
- Fred Harder as Member of Singing Tramps
- Art Moore as Member of Singing Tramps
- Bob Snyder as Member of Singing Tramps
- Dan Brodie as Morgan's Assistant
- Charles Dorety as 1st Taxi Driver
- Jack Evans as Hobo on Freight Train
- George Grandee as Dance Director
- Harrison Greene as Poultry Equipment Salesman
- I. Stanford Jolley as Piano Playing Hobo

== Musical numbers ==
- "I'm Richer Than a Millionaire" – Professor
- "I'm Sorta Kinda Glad" – Professor
- "Old Fashioned Melody" – Teddy, Professor
- "What More Could I Ask For" – Professor and the Singing Tramps

== Reception ==
In his book Swing Changes, David Ware Stowe incorrectly attributes the title role as the professor to Kay Kyser who does not appear in the film.

In the January 1938 edition of The Motion Picture Guide, Graham & Nash write that the film is above average and that it has an amusing story, with "songs that are pleasantly woven into the action".
