= Saving the Family Name =

1916 film by Lois Weber, Phillips Smalley

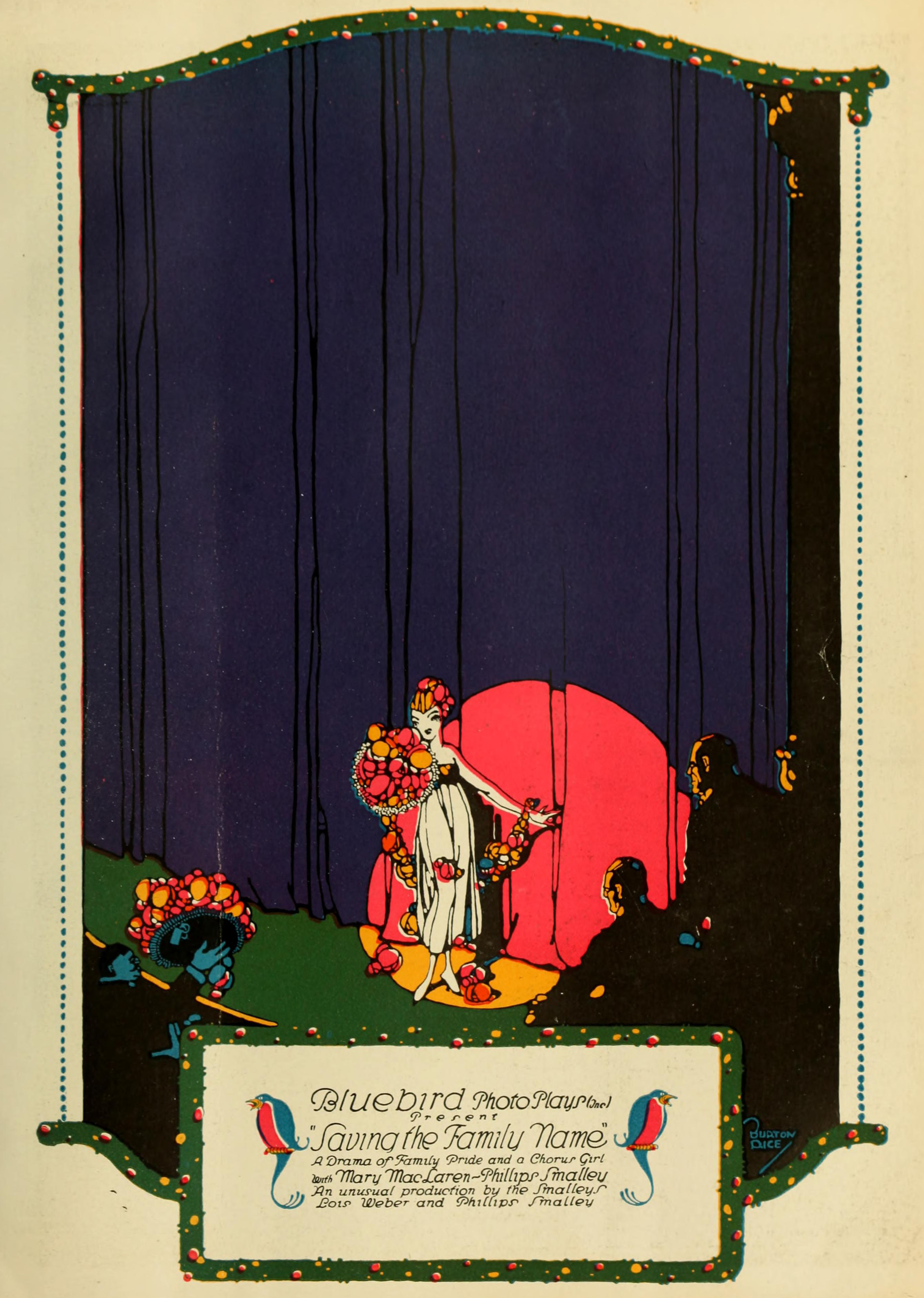
- Theatrical release poster
- Directed by: Lois Weber; Phillips Smalley
- Screenplay by: Lois Weber
- Starring: Mary MacLaren; Gerard Alexander; Carl von Schiller; Jack Holt; Phillips Smalley; Harry Depp
- Cinematography: Allen G. Siegler
- Production company: Bluebird Photoplays, Inc.
- Distributed by: Bluebird Photoplays, Inc.
- Release date: September 11, 1916
- Running time: 50 minutes
- Country: United States
- Language: Silent (English intertitles)

Saving the Family Name is a 1916 American drama film directed by Lois Weber and Phillips Smalley and written by Lois Weber. The film stars Mary MacLaren, Gerard Alexander, Carl von Schiller, Jack Holt, Phillips Smalley, and Harry Depp. The film was released on September 11, 1916, by Bluebird Photoplays, Inc.

== Cast ==
- Mary MacLaren as Estelle Ryan
- Gerard Alexander as Mrs. Winthrop
- Carl von Schiller as Wally Dreislin
- Jack Holt as Jansen Winthrop
- Phillips Smalley as Robert Winthrop
- Harry Depp as Billie Schramm
- Gail Hawksworth as Dancer (uncredited)
