= Orphans of the Street =

1938 film by John H. Auer

- Directed by: John H. Auer
- Screenplay by: Eric Taylor; Jack Townley; Olive Cooper
- Story by: Earl Felton
- Produced by: Herman Schlom
- Starring: Tommy Ryan; Robert Livingston; June Storey; Ralph Morgan; Harry Davenport; James Burke
- Cinematography: Ernest Miller
- Edited by: Ernest J. Nims; Murray Seldeen
- Music by: Cy Feuer; William Lava
- Production company: Republic Pictures
- Distributed by: Republic Pictures
- Release date: December 5, 1938
- Running time: 64 minutes
- Country: United States
- Language: English

Orphans of the Street is a 1938 American drama film directed by John H. Auer and written by Eric Taylor, Jack Townley and Olive Cooper. The film stars Tommy Ryan, Robert Livingston, June Storey, Ralph Morgan, Harry Davenport and James Burke. The film was released on December 5, 1938, by Republic Pictures.

== Cast ==
- Tommy Ryan as Tommy Ryan
- Robert Livingston as Bob Clayton
- June Storey as Lorna Ramsey
- Ralph Morgan as Martin Sands
- Harry Davenport as Doc Will Ramsey
- James Burke as Police Officer Lou Manning
- Sidney Blackmer as Parker
- Victor Kilian as Dave Farmer
- Hobart Cavanaugh as William Grant
- Herbert Rawlinson as Adams
- Robert Gleckler as Hughes
- Ian Wolfe as Eli Thadius Bunting
- Reed Hadley as Miller
- Don Douglas as Colonel Daniels
- Paul Everton as Judge
- Ace the Wonder Dog as Skippy
