= William Forrest (actor) =

American actor (1902–1989)

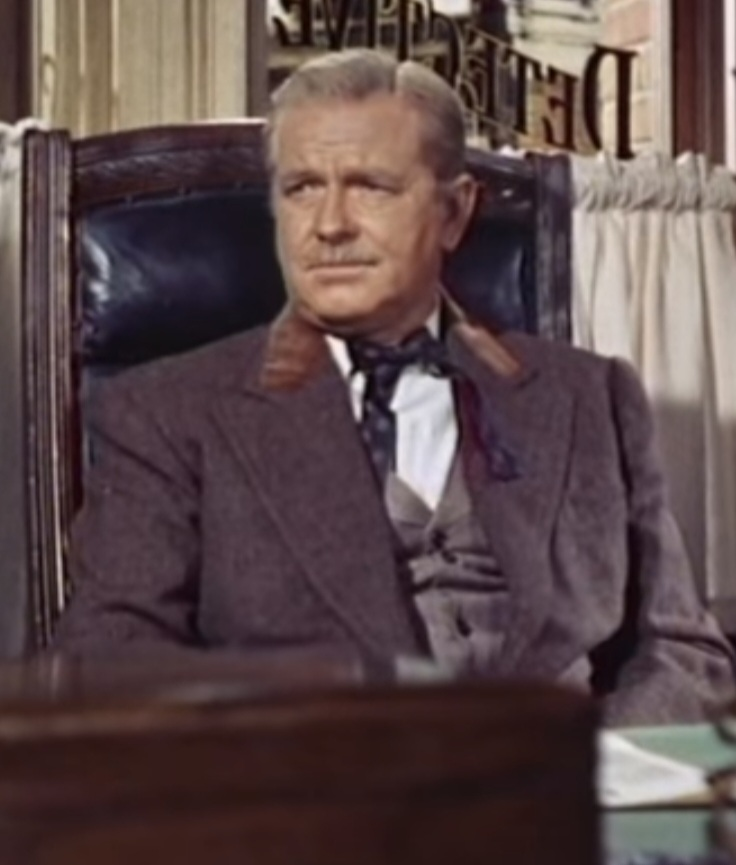
- Forrest in Rage at Dawn (1955)
- Born: October 10, 1902; Cambridge, Massachusetts, U.S.
- Died: January 26, 1989 (aged 86); Santa Monica, California, U.S.
- Education: Princeton University
- Occupation: Actor
- Years active: 1938–1977

William Forrest (October 10, 1902 – January 26, 1989) was an American theatre, film, and television actor.

== Biography ==
Forrest attended Princeton University, where he was a star in athletics. His acting career began in 1938 at the Pasadena Playhouse, and he appeared in more than 250 films between 1939 and 1977. He was born in Cambridge, Massachusetts, and died in Santa Monica, California, from heart failure.

== Partial filmography ==
- The Green Hornet Strikes Again (1940)
- The Lone Wolf Meets a Lady (1940)
- The Secret Seven (1940)
- The Lone Wolf Takes a Chance (1941)
- Keep 'Em Flying (1941)
- Of Pups and Puzzles (1941) (short)
- Daring Young Man (1942)
- Tarzan's New York Adventure (1942)
- Yankee Doodle Dandy (1942) as 1st Critic (uncredited)
- The Masked Marvel (1943)
- Good Morning, Judge (1943)
- The Fighting Seabees (1944)
- Adventures of Kitty O'Day (1945)
- Girls of the Big House (1945)
- Gangs of the Waterfront (1945)
- The Caribbean Mystery (1945) as Colonel Lane
- Blind Spot (1947)
- Devil Ship (1947)
- The Devil on Wheels (1947)
- Dead Reckoning (1947) as Lt. Col. Simpson (uncredited)
- Miracle on 34th Street (1947) as Doctor Roger at Bellevue
- Trail of the Yukon (1949) as Banker John Dawson
- The Story of Seabiscuit (1949) as Thomas Milford
- Follow the Sun (1951)
- Jet Job (1952)
- Band of Angels (1957) as Aaron Starr (uncredited)
- Jailhouse Rock (1957) as Studio Head (uncredited)
- The Last Hurrah (1958)
- Billy the Kid vs. Dracula (1966)
