= Parole Racket =

1937 film by Charles C. Coleman

- Directed by: Charles C. Coleman
- Written by: Harold Shumate
- Produced by: Wallace MacDonald
- Starring: Paul Kelly; Rosalind Keith; Thurston Hall
- Cinematography: George Meehan
- Edited by: Richard Fantl
- Music by: M.W. Stoloff
- Production company: Columbia Pictures
- Distributed by: Columbia Pictures
- Release date: March 11, 1937
- Running time: 62 minutes
- Country: United States
- Language: English

Parole Racket is a 1937 American crime drama film, directed by Charles C. Coleman and released by Columbia Pictures. It stars Paul Kelly, Rosalind Keith, Thurston Hall.
