= The Port of 40 Thieves =

1944 film by John English

- Theatrical release poster
- Directed by: John English
- Screenplay by: Dane Lussier
- Story by: Dane Lussier
- Produced by: Walter H. Goetz
- Starring: Stephanie Bachelor; Tom Keene; Lynne Roberts; Olive Blakeney; Russell Hicks; George Meeker
- Cinematography: Jack A. Marta
- Edited by: Richard L. Van Enger
- Music by: Joseph Dubin
- Production company: Republic Pictures
- Distributed by: Republic Pictures
- Release date: August 13, 1944
- Running time: 58 minutes
- Country: United States
- Language: English

The Port of 40 Thieves is a 1944 American crime film directed by John English, written by Dane Lussier, and starring Stephanie Bachelor, Tom Keene, Lynne Roberts, Olive Blakeney, Russell Hicks and George Meeker. The film was released on August 13, 1944, by Republic Pictures.

== Plot ==
Muriel Chaney was the wife of the wealthy Hartford Chaney III when he disappeared under mysterious circumstances. The scheming widow sets out to marry her lover Frederick St. Clair, but Chaney's daughter (Muriel's stepdaughter) suspects that her father has been murdered. Muriel plans several more killings to clear herself of suspicion, including St. Clair's.

== Cast ==
- Stephanie Bachelor as Muriel Chaney
- Tom Keene as Scott Barton (billed as Richard Powers)
- Lynne Roberts as Nancy Hubbard Chaney (billed as Lynn Roberts)
- Olive Blakeney as Aunt Caroline Hubbard
- Russell Hicks as Charles Farrington
- George Meeker as Frederick St. Clair
- Mary Field as Della
- Ellen Lowe as Miss Jones
- Patricia Knox as Gladys Burns
- John Hamilton as Mr. Fellows
- Harry Depp as Train Conductor
