= Arson Gang Busters =

1938 film by Joseph Kane

- Theatrical release poster
- Directed by: Joseph Kane
- Screenplay by: Alex Gottlieb; Norman Burnstine; Joseph Hoffman
- Produced by: Herman Schlom
- Starring: Robert Livingston; Rosalind Keith; Jackie Moran; Warren Hymer; Jack La Rue; Clay Clement
- Cinematography: Ernest Miller
- Edited by: Edward Mann
- Music by: Alberto Colombo
- Production company: Republic Pictures
- Distributed by: Republic Pictures
- Release date: March 28, 1938
- Running time: 65 minutes
- Country: United States
- Language: English

Arson Gang Busters is a 1938 American action film directed by Joseph Kane and written by Alex Gottlieb, Norman Burnstine and Joseph Hoffman. The film stars Robert Livingston, Rosalind Keith, Jackie Moran, Warren Hymer, Jack La Rue and Clay Clement. The film was released on March 28, 1938, by Republic Pictures.

== Plot ==
Fireman Bill O'Connell is allocated in the Arson Squad with the objective of stopping a gang of for-profit arsonists who are causing property and lives to be lost.

== Cast ==
- Robert Livingston as Bill O'Connell
- Rosalind Keith as Joan Lawrence
- Jackie Moran as Jimmy Riler
- Warren Hymer as Tom Jones
- Jack La Rue as Bud Morgan
- Clay Clement as Hamilton
- Selmer Jackson as Commissioner Benton
- Emory Parnell as Chief J.P. Riley
- Walter Sande as Oscar
- Dick Wessel as Slugs
- Jack Rice as Bradbury
- Lloyd Whitlock as Martin
