= Tom Herbert =

American actor (1888–1946)

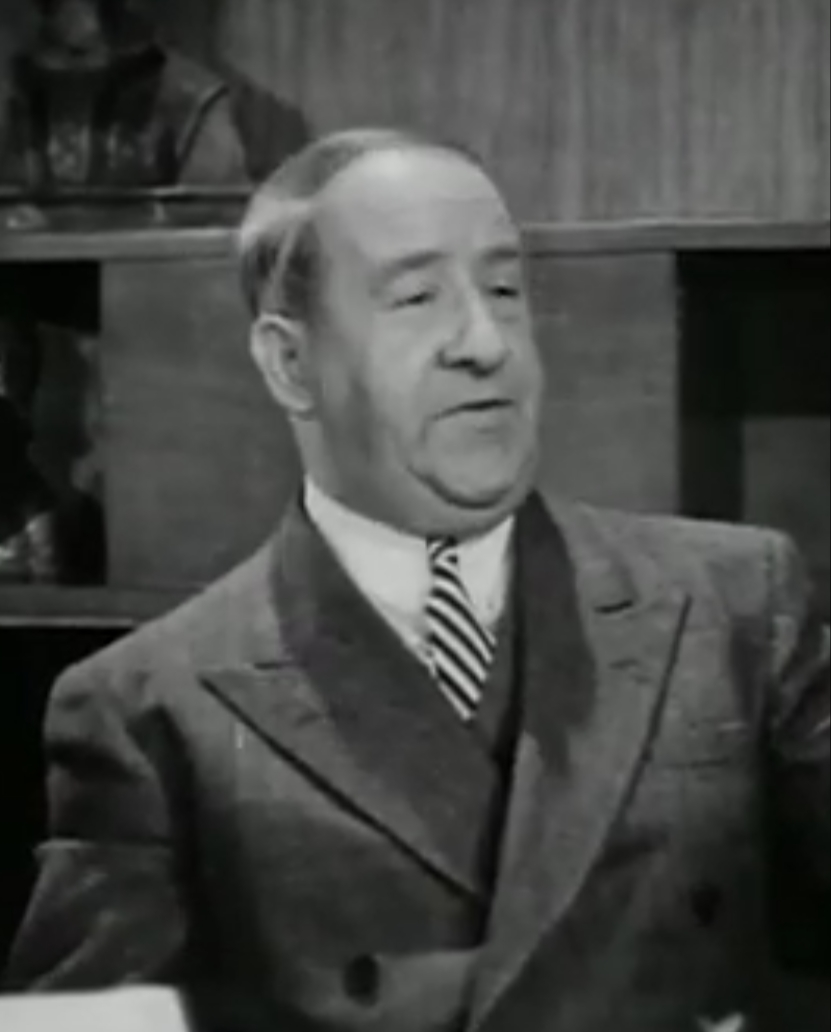
- Herbert in Too Many Women (1942)
- Born: November 25, 1888; New York City, New York, U.S.
- Died: April 3, 1946 (aged 57); Los Angeles, California, U.S.
- Occupation: Actor
- Years active: 1931–1946

Tom Herbert (November 25, 1888 – April 3, 1946) was an American character actor of the 1930s and 1940s.

== Biography ==
Born in New York City on November 25, 1888, Herbert broke into the film industry in RKO's Traveling Husbands (1931). During the next seventeen years he would appear in over 50 feature films, usually in bit or supporting roles. Early in his career he was sometimes billed as Tom Francis, as he was in Traveling Husbands. His final picture, which was released after his death in 1946, was the Cole Porter biopic, Night and Day, starring Cary Grant and Alexis Smith. He was the brother to the actor, Hugh Herbert. Tom Herbert died on April 3, 1946.

== Filmography ==
(Per AFI database)

- Traveling Husbands (1931) as Walter (credited as Tom Francis)
- Consolation Marriage (1931) as Dog Owner (uncredited)
- Ladies of the Jury (1932) as Wilbur - Jury Room Officer (uncredited) (credited as Tom Francis)
- Bed of Roses (1933) as Salesman Ogelthorpe (credited as Tom Francis)
- Advice to the Lovelorn (1933) as Reporter (uncredited) (credited as Tom Francis)
- Secrets of Hollywood (1933) as Bob - a Writer (credited as Tom Francis)
- The Cat's-Paw (1934) as Drunk (uncredited)
- Belle of the Nineties (1934) as Gilbert
- You Can't Buy Everything (1934) as Salesman Sleeping on Train (uncredited) (credited as Tom Francis)
- The Merry Widow (1934) as Orthodox Priest (uncredited) (credited as Tom Francis)
- Wild Gold (1934) as Traveling Salesman (uncredited)
- Helldorado (1935) as Hot Dog Stand Proprietor (uncredited)
- The Casino Murder Case (1935) as Reporter (uncredited)
- Love Me Forever (1935) as Cafe Customer (uncredited)
- Metropolitan (1935)
- Grand Exit (1935) as Twigs (uncredited) (credited as Tom Francis)
- Banjo on My Knee (1936) as Man in chair at Scott's (uncredited)
- Poppy (1936)
- Wife vs. Secretary (1936) as Business Man in Lobby (uncredited)
- The Princess Comes Across (1936) as Cabin Steward (uncredited)
- The Magnificent Brute (1936) as Drunk Worker (uncredited)
- Love on the Run (1936) as Comic Taxi Driver (uncredited)
- Think Fast, Mr. Moto (1937) as Seasick Male Passenger (uncredited)
- Top of the Town (1937) as Comedy Waiter (uncredited)
- The Wildcatter (1937)
- Hot Water (1937) as Barber's Customer (uncredited)
- Merry-Go-Round of 1938 (1937) as Waiter (uncredited)
- Step Lively, Jeeves! (1937) as Bartender (uncredited)
- Conquest (1937) as Servant (uncredited)
- Stars Over Arizona (1937) as Doc
- Rascals (1938) as Patient (uncredited)
- Professor Beware (1938) as Hobo (uncredited)
- Fast and Furious (1939) as Man Sweating in Elevator (uncredited)
- Kitty Foyle (1940) as Nightclub Waiter #2 (uncredited)
- We Who Are Young (1940) as Drunk (uncredited)
- The Golden Fleecing (1940) as Aide (uncredited)
- The Deadly Game (1941) as FBI Agent
- Hello, Sucker (1941) as Minor Role (uncredited)
- The Man Who Lost Himself (1941) as News Vendor (uncredited)
- Harvard, Here I Come (1941) as Prof. Teeter
- Tennessee Johnson (1942) as Lang (uncredited)
- Broadway Big Shot (1942) as Carnation Charlie
- Her Cardboard Lover (1942)
- Too Many Women (1942) as W. R. Mitchell
- Dixie (1943) as Homer
- Ghosts on the Loose (1943) as Park Central Plaza Desk Clerk (uncredited)
- Lost in a Harem (1944) as Café Drunk (uncredited)
- Sailor's Holiday (1944)
- Shadow of Suspicion (1944) as Holman
- Shine on Harvest Moon (1944) as Drunk at Table (uncredited)
- Block Busters (1944) as Meyer
- Along Came Jones (1945) as Card Player (uncredited)
- Steppin' in Society (1945) as Hilliard
- Twice Blessed (1945) as Danceland Manager (uncredited)
- Night and Day (1946) as Drunk (uncredited)
