= Frederick Lester =

East India Company army officer

Lieutenant General Sir Frederick Lester KCB
- Born: Frederick Parkinson Lester; 3 February 1795
- Died: 3 July 1858 (aged 63); Belgaum, Bombay Presidency, India
- Military career
- Allegiance: United Kingdom
- Branch: British Army; East India Company
- Rank: Lieutenant-General
- Commands: Southern Division of the Bombay Army
- Conflicts: Indian Mutiny
- Awards: Knight Commander of the Order of the Bath

Lieutenant-General Sir Frederick Parkinson Lester, KCB (3 February 1795 – 3 July 1858) was an army officer in the East India Company.

== Early life ==
Born on 3 February 1795, to John Lester a member of the prominent Lester merchant family of Poole, Dorset and the nephew of Benjamin Lester, MP for Poole, his mother was Elizabeth Parkinson, daughter of John Parkinson. Educated at Mr Jephson's academy at Camberwell and at Addiscombe Military Seminary. He qualified for a commission into the Bombay artillery on 22 April 1811.

== Military career ==
Lester's commissions, all in the Bombay artillery, were: second-lieutenant (25 October 1811), lieutenant (3 September 1815), captain (1 September 1818), major (14 May 1836), lieutenant colonel (9 August 1840), brevet colonel (15 March 1851), and major-general (28 November 1854). he was finally promoted to Lieutenant General on 3 July 1858. Lester's career was marked by its efficiency, resulting in his being 'specially thanked for his zealous and efficient services' by the governor of Bombay in April 1847. His career during his service in India chiefly involved acting commissary of ordnance, commissary of stores, and secretary to (and afterwards ordinary member of) the military board. A system of double-entry bookkeeping introduced by him was, in 1834, ordered to be generally adopted in the Ordnance department. Lester was appointed to command the southern division of the Bombay army in April 1857, he assumed command there at his headquarters at Belgaum on 12 May 1857. Major-General Sir George Le Grand Jacob stated that his actions between May and September 1857 'in all probability to have prevented an explosion at Belgaum.' He repaired the fort, moved the powder and ammunition inside the fort, deported suspected sepoys, and moved guns, gun carriages, and horses into the fort. In addition he organized night-time patrols (chiefly of civilian volunteers) and moved the depot of Her Majesty's 64th regiment, with 400 European women and children, into the fort. He vetoed the proposal of the commanding officer of the 29th Bombay native infantry, backed by the political agent, Mr Seton-Karr, to disarm the regiment as potential mutineers on the ground of the inadequacy of any European force for the task, and the possibility of a failure which would end in disaster. On the arrival of British troops (10 August 1857) he supervised the court-martial, execution, and other punishment of rebels. One of these courts-martial consisted entirely of Indian non-commissioned officers, a testament to Lester's wise leadership. The measures were among the precautions which prevented the insurrection spreading to western India, and Lester was hardly given the credit due to him for them.

== Personal life ==
Lester was a deeply religious man. During his period in India, a profane conversation at which Sir John Keane, 5th Baronet was present resulted in his leaving a mess breakfast table in protest against the conversation and it placed him temporarily under an official cloud.

Lester married twice, first, in 1828, at St Thomas's Church, Bombay, Helen Elizabeth Honner, they had two children, both of whom died in infancy. He married secondly, in 1840, at Mahabaleshwar, Charlotte Pratt Fyvie, daughter of the Revd William Fyvie (nephew of Elizabeth Simpson, wife of Henry Bridgeman, 1st Baron Bradford; through the Simpsons he was also first cousin of Henry Liddell, 1st Earl of Ravensworth and Sir John Dean Paul, 1st Baronet); they had five children, including:

- Charlotte Elizabeth Lester (1842-1874), married James Rhoades.
- Rev. John Moore Lester (1851-1919), Rector of Litchborough, married twice, his descendants included his grandchildren, James Shaw, Baron Kilbrandon and Katherine DeMille, née Lester.
- Horace Frank Lester (1853-1896)

Lester was found dead in his bed of heart disease at 7 a.m. on 3 July 1858, at Belgaum.
