= Too Many Women =

Too Many Women may refer to:

- God's Gift to Women, also known as Too Many Women, a 1931 British film directed by Michael Curtiz
- Too Many Women (1929 film), an American film directed by Sam Newfield
- Too Many Women (1932 film), an American film directed by Lloyd French and Robert A. McGowan
- Too Many Women (1942 film), an American film directed by Bernard B. Ray
- Too Many Women (novel), a 1947 detective novel by Rex Stout about Nero Wolfe
