= Katherine DeMille =

American actress (1911–1995)

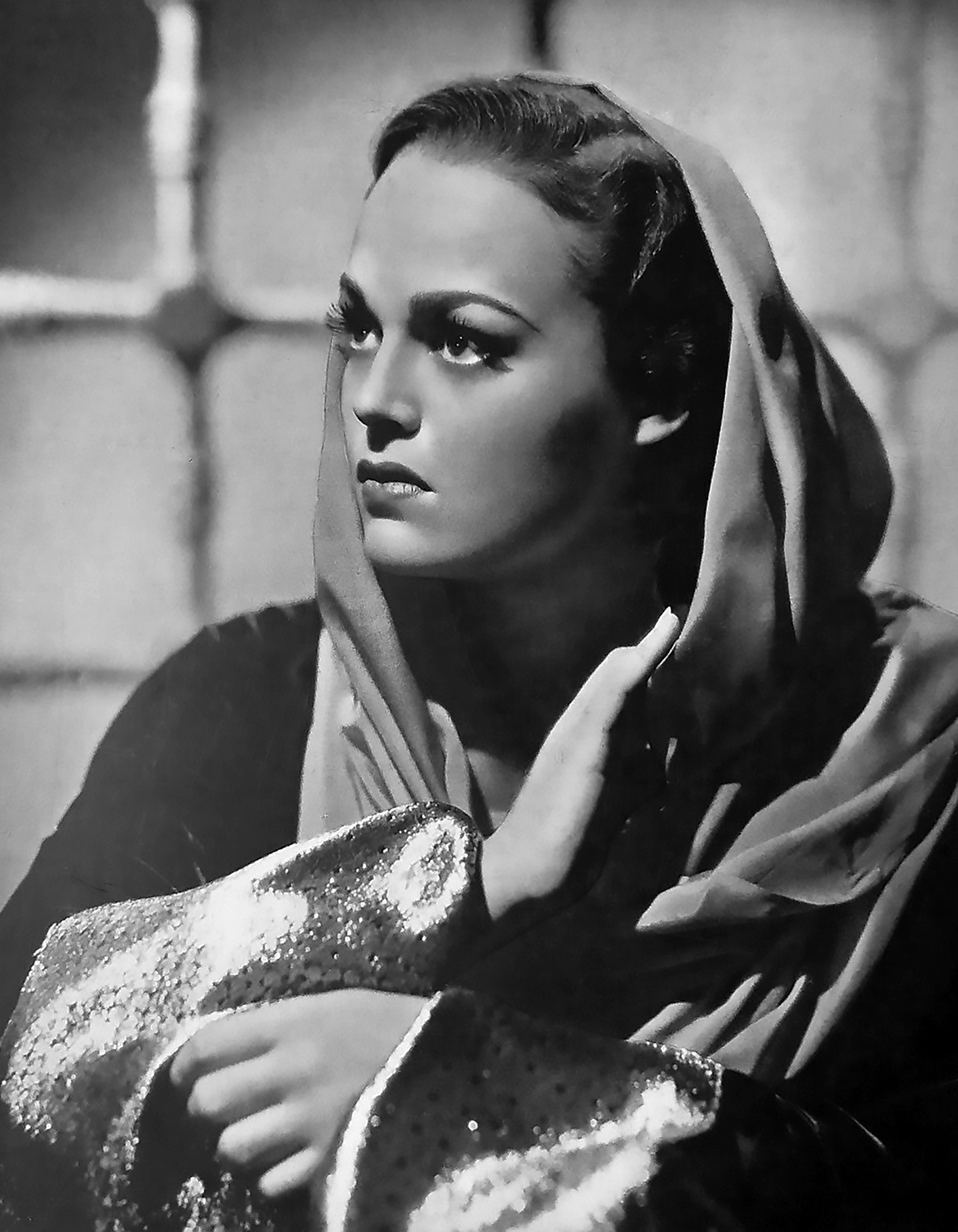
- DeMille on the cover of CINEGRAF magazine (Editorial Atlántida), Argentina, 1936
- Born: Katherine Paula Lester; June 29, 1911; Vancouver, British Columbia, Canada
- Died: April 27, 1995 (aged 83); Tucson, Arizona, U.S.
- Other names: Katherine Lester DeMille; Katherine DeMille Quinn
- Occupation: Actress
- Years active: 1930–1956
- Spouse: Anthony Quinn (m. 1937; div. 1965)
- Children: 5
- Parent(s): Cecil B. DeMille; Constance Adams DeMille
- Relatives: Henry C. de Mille (grandfather); Beatrice deMille (grandmother); Richard de Mille (brother); William C. deMille (uncle); Agnes de Mille (cousin); Peggy George (cousin)

Katherine Lester DeMille (born Katherine Paula Lester; June 29, 1911 – April 27, 1995) was an American actress who played 25 credited film roles from the mid-1930s to the late 1940s.

The adopted daughter of director Cecil B. DeMille, she was considered Hollywood royalty and was noted for her dark beauty. Her first credited role was featured in Viva Villa! (1934). She signed a contract with Paramount Pictures and portrayed Princess Alice of France in her father's epic The Crusades (1935) and also starred in The Sky Parade (1936).

DeMille continued her career at 20th Century Fox and other studios until 1941, when she retired to dedicate her time to her family. She returned to films with roles in Black Gold and Unconquered (both 1947) and starred in her final film, The Judge, in 1949. In his autobiography, her father wrote that she "has carried the name DeMille on for another generation in motion pictures as a talented actress."

== Early years ==
DeMille was born Katherine Paula Lester on June 29, 1911 in Vancouver, British Columbia, Canada. Her biological father, Edward Gabriel Lester, was a Scottish-born English schoolteacher who served as a lieutenant in the 102nd Battalion, CEF during World War I and died at the Battle of Vimy Ridge in 1917 and was the grandson of Lieutenant General Sir Frederick Parkinson Lester. Her birth mother, Cecile Bianca Bertha Colani, was of Italian descent and died in a Los Angeles hospital. She was a paternal granddaughter of Reverend John Moore Lester, rector of Litchborough, Northamptonshire, England. Her maternal grandfather, Johann Colani, was an architect.

When she was eight years old, she was found in an orphanage by Constance Adams DeMille, the wife of producer and director Cecil B. DeMille. The DeMilles adopted Katherine, their third child, in 1922.

== Career ==
DeMille gained experience on stage in 1930 "by acting as understudy for the feminine 'heavy' of the play Rebound" in San Francisco. She wanted to begin an acting career on her own and used the stage name "Kay Marsh" whenever she worked as an extra.

DeMille's first credited role was Rosita Morales, the wife of Wallace Beery's Pancho Villa, in the 1934 MGM film Viva Villa!.

=== Paramount Pictures (1934–1936) ===
She played another Mexican woman, a maid named Lupe, in the Paramount production The Trumpet Blows (1934), and her performance earned her a contract with Paramount Pictures. Her next role was Molly Bryant, the nemesis of Mae West's character in Belle of the Nineties (1934). She played the second female role in All the King's Horses (1935) at Paramount, and was loaned to Columbia Pictures for The Black Room (1935) and to 20th Century Fox for Call of the Wild (1935).

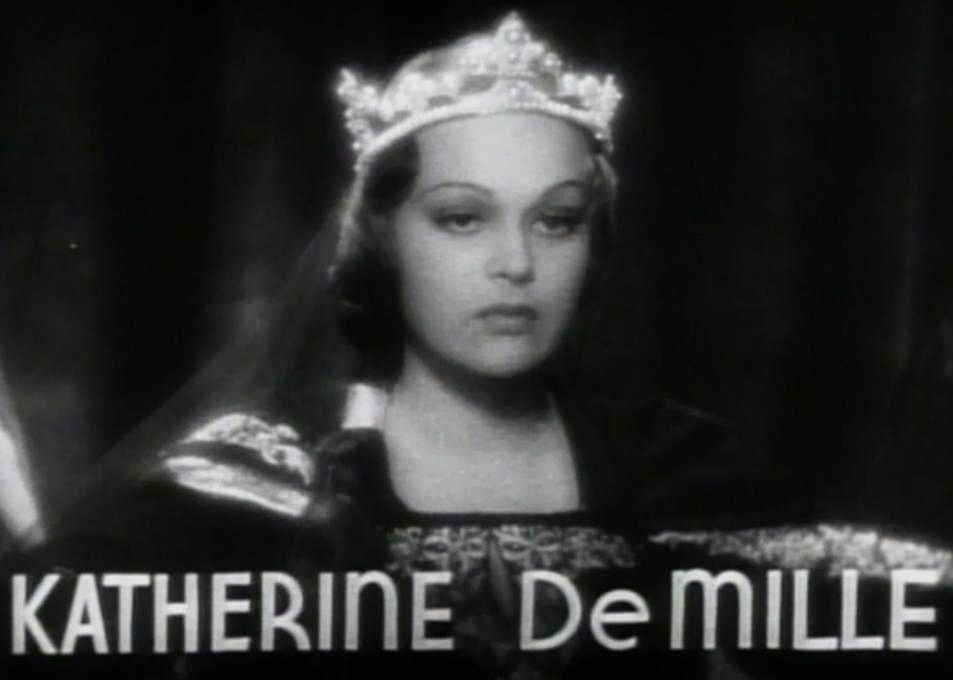
DeMille in the trailer for The Crusades (1935)

The role of Princess Alice of France in The Crusades (1935) was a Christmas gift from her father, Cecil B. DeMille. Andre Sennwald of The New York Times wrote that the actors who gave "excellent performances" in the film included "that striking brunette, Katherine De Mille." Hollywood also praised DeMille, who was "splendid as the jilted Princess Alice of France."

Paramount then cast her in two more leading roles; she was the sister of Buster Crabbe in the Western Drift Fence (1936) and a parachutist and the romantic interest of William Gargan in the aviation drama The Sky Parade (1936). She returned to MGM to play the uncredited role of Rosaline, Romeo's first love, in the 1936 film adaptation of William Shakespeare's Romeo and Juliet.

=== 20th Century Fox and other films (1936–1941) ===
In the mid-1930s, she signed a contract with 20th Century Fox. The studio cast her in the role of Margarita in its 1936 Technicolor film version of the Helen Hunt Jackson novel Ramona, starring Loretta Young as the title character. She was Barbara Stanwyck's rival for the love of Joel McCrea in Banjo on My Knee (1936) and played the main female role in Charlie Chan at the Olympics (1937). She received third billing as an antagonist in The Californian (1937) and played a much smaller part in Love Under Fire (1937).

She went to Columbia Pictures to co-star as Jack Holt's leading lady in Under Suspicion (1937). She had a minor supporting role in the Walter Wanger production Blockade (1938), a drama about the Spanish Civil War. Again at Columbia, she was cast in the leading female role in another Jack Holt vehicle, Trapped in the Sky (1939).

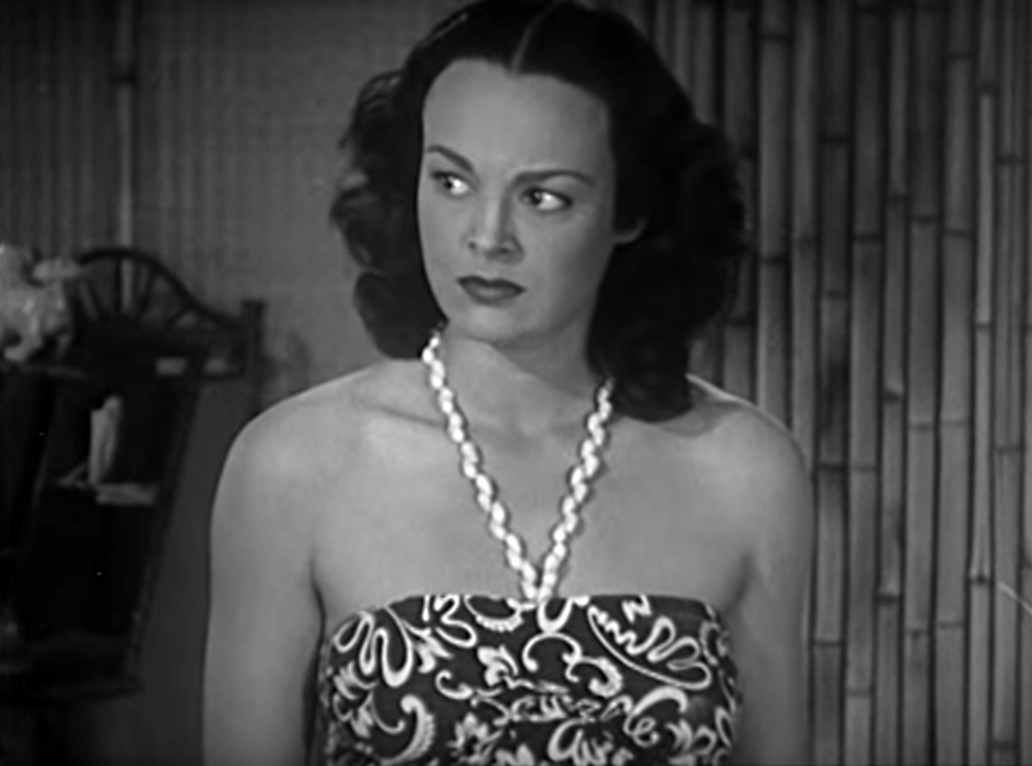
DeMille in the film Isle of Destiny (1940)

DeMille played supporting roles in the Roy Rogers vehicle In Old Caliente (1939), the RKO adventure Isle of Destiny (1940), the Columbia mystery film Ellery Queen, Master Detective (1940), the Universal mystery film Dark Streets of Cairo (1940), and Paramount's Technicolor adventure Aloma of the South Seas (1941). She retired from films to raise her children and devote her time to her family.

=== Final film roles (1947–1949) ===
After a six-year absence, DeMille returned to the screen when she co-starred with her husband, Anthony Quinn, for the first and only time in the Allied Artists drama Black Gold (1947), directed by Phil Karlson. She received good notices from the critics. Motion Picture Daily opined that she deserved to share Quinn's "highest acting compliment . . . The tender byplay of their mutual understanding, respect and love provide the refreshingly different romance of the picture." The Film Daily wrote: "Katherine DeMille does splendid work as Quinn's wife, who has had good schooling, but is a loyal, obedient helpmeet." Harrison's Reports also commended the performances of the Quinns: "As to the acting, both Anthony Quinn and Katherine DeMille rise to the occasion."

Her father cast her in a supporting role in his epic Unconquered (1947), starring Gary Cooper and Paulette Goddard. The Film Daily noticed that, as the Native American wife of the antagonist portrayed by Howard Da Silva, "Miss DeMille is properly sullen and tragic."

Her final credited role was Lucille Strang, the wife of Milburn Stone's character, in the film noir The Judge (1949), a Film Classics release directed by Elmer Clifton. Showmen's Trade Review praised the work of both Stone and DeMille: "The two stars, Milburn Stone and Katherine DeMille, contribute excellent acting, keeping their characterizations consistently within the film's framework."

== Personal life ==
DeMille married actor Anthony Quinn on October 2, 1937 at All Saints' Episcopal Church in Beverly Hills. They had five children: Christopher (1939-1941), Christina (born December 1, 1941), Catalina (born November 21, 1942), Duncan (born August 4, 1945), and Valentina (born December 26, 1952). Their first child, Christopher, was found drowned in the lily pond of W.C. Fields' property at age two.

DeMille became a naturalized citizen of the United States in 1938.

DeMille accepted the 1953 Academy Award for Best Supporting Actor on behalf of her husband, who was not present at the ceremony. At the same ceremony, her father received the Academy Award for Best Picture for his film The Greatest Show on Earth.

In October 1957, DeMille accompanied her father in his trip to Italy, where both were received by Italian president Giovanni Gronchi.

Quinn was not a faithful husband. He wanted a divorce so that he could be free to raise his illegitimate children by an Italian woman. In December 1964, Quinn sued DeMille for divorce in Ciudad Juárez, Mexico, and "listed incompatibility in the suit as grounds for divorce." They were divorced on January 21, 1965. DeMille retained her married name.

Her brother, Richard de Mille, later remembered: "I was wild about Katherine. She was extremely lovable and beautiful, a terrific combination. Was she ill-used by Quinn? Absolutely, but not in a way that she resented. She was always in love with him. Cecil had respected Constance and always treated her fairly; I don't think Quinn treated Katherine fairly."

== Later years and death ==
Around 1988, DeMille moved from Pacific Palisades to Tucson, Arizona to live with one of her daughters and grandchildren. She died of Alzheimer's disease in Tucson on April 27, 1995. She was 83.

== Filmography ==
Year	Title	Role	Notes
1930	Madame Satan	Zeppelin Reveler	Uncredited
1931	Son of India	Amah - Karim's Servant	Uncredited
1931	Girls About Town	Girl	Uncredited
1934	Viva Villa!	Rosita Morales	
1934	The Trumpet Blows	Lupe the Maid	
1934	Belle of the Nineties	Molly Brant	
1935	All the King's Horses	Fraulein Mimi	
1935	The Black Room	Mashka	
1935	The Call of the Wild	Marie	
1935	The Crusades	Alice, Princess of France	
1936	Drift Fence	Molly Dunn	
1936	The Sky Parade	Geraldine Croft	
1936	Romeo and Juliet	Rosaline	Uncredited
1936	Ramona	Margarita	
1936	Banjo on My Knee	Leota Long	
1937	Charlie Chan at the Olympics	Yvonne Roland	
1937	The Californian	Chata	
1937	Love Under Fire	Rosa	
1937	Under Suspicion	Mary Brookhart	
1938	Blockade	Cabaret Girl	
1939	Trapped in the Sky	Carol Rayder	
1939	In Old Caliente	Rita Vargas	
1940	Isle of Destiny	Inda Barton	
1940	Ellery Queen, Master Detective	Valerie Norris	
1940	Dark Streets of Cairo	Shari Abbadi	
1941	Aloma of the South Seas	Kari	
1947	Black Gold	Sarah Eagle	
1947	Unconquered	Hannah	
1949	The Judge	Lucille Strang	Final credited role
1956	Man from Del Rio	Woman	Uncredited

== Bibliography ==
- DeMille, Cecil B. (1959). The Autobiography of Cecil B. DeMille. Prentice-Hall.
- Eyman, Scott (2010). Empire of Dreams: The Epic Life of Cecil B. DeMille. Simon & Schuster. ISBN 9781439180419.
