= Under Suspicion (1937 film) =

1937 film by Lewis D. Collins

- Directed by: Lewis D. Collins
- Written by: Joseph Hoffman; Jefferson Parker
- Based on: Murderers Welcome story in Liberty by Philip Wylie
- Produced by: Larry Darmour
- Starring: Jack Holt; Katherine DeMille; Luis Alberni
- Cinematography: James S. Brown Jr.
- Edited by: Dwight Caldwell
- Music by: Lee Zahler
- Production company: Larry Darmour Productions
- Distributed by: Columbia Pictures
- Release date: November 22, 1937
- Running time: 61 minutes
- Country: United States
- Language: English

Under Suspicion is a 1937 American mystery film directed by Lewis D. Collins and starring Jack Holt, Katherine DeMille and Luis Alberni.

== Plot ==
Millionaire automobile manufacturer Robert Bailey announces that he plans to turn over ownership of his company to the employees. This outrages his fellow stockholders and two attempts are made to kill him. Bailey summons them all to his lodge in order to try to work out which is the potential murderer.

== Cast ==
- Jack Holt as Robert Bailey
- Katherine DeMille as Mary Brookhart
- Luis Alberni as Luigi
- Rosalind Keith as Doris
- Esther Muir as Frances
- Purnell Pratt as Frank Rogers
- Maurice Murphy as Ralph
- Morgan Wallace as Carey MacGregor
- Granville Bates as K.Y. Mitchell
- Craig Reynolds as Nelson Dudley
- Robert Emmett Keane as Logan Walters
- Margaret Irving as Laura Walters
- Clyde Dilson as Eddie
- George Anderson as Bill
- Lee Phelps as Private Detective

== Bibliography ==
- Goble, Alan. The Complete Index to Literary Sources in Film. Walter de Gruyter, 1999.
