= Stars Over Arizona =

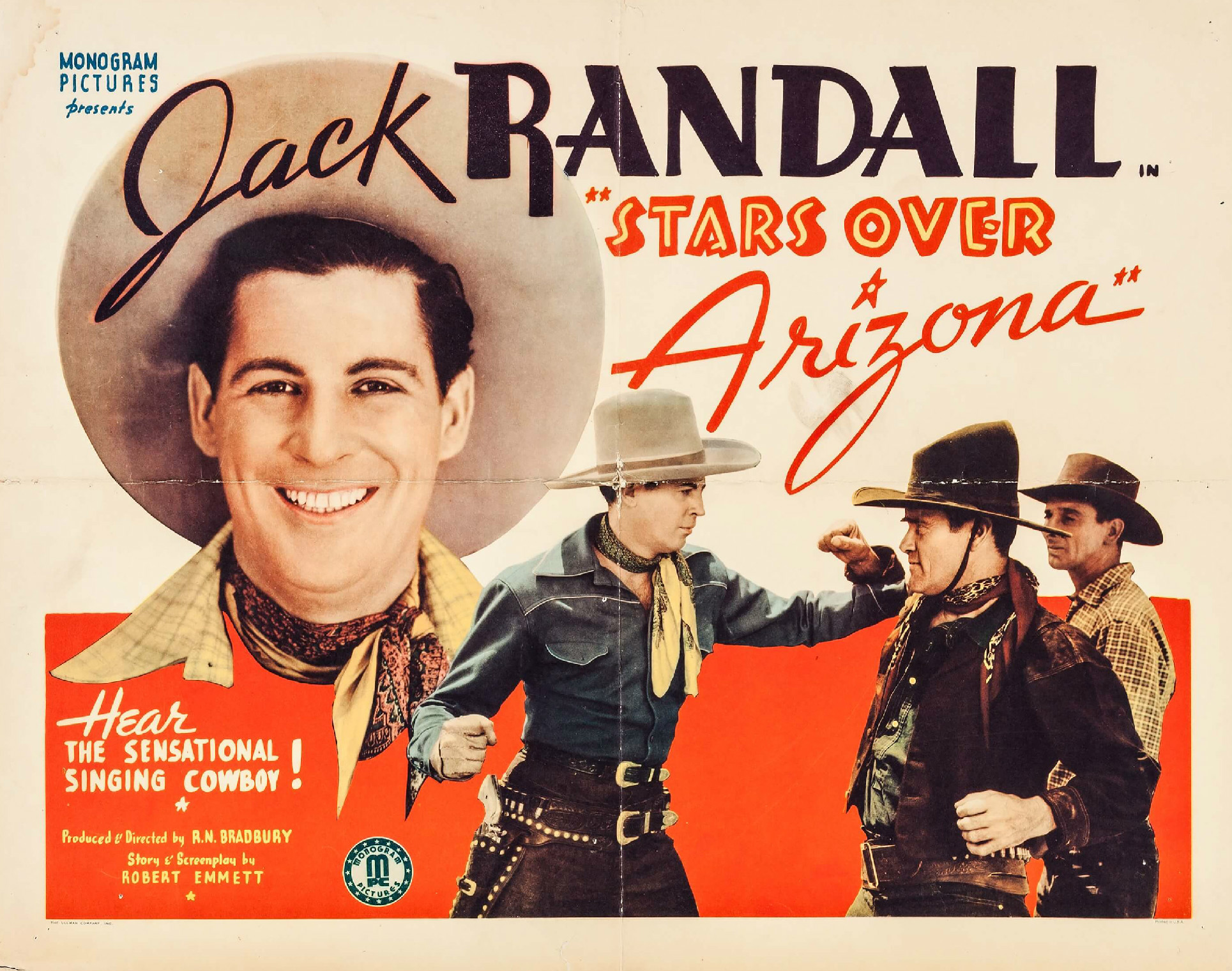
- Theatrical release poster
- Directed by: Robert North Bradbury
- Screenplay by: Robert Emmett Tansey
- Produced by: Robert North Bradbury
- Starring: Jack Randall; Kathleen Eliot; Horace Murphy; Warner Richmond; Tom Herbert; Chick Hannan
- Cinematography: Bert Longenecker
- Edited by: Harold Dillinger
- Music by: Frank Sanucci
- Production company: Monogram Pictures
- Distributed by: Monogram Pictures
- Release date: September 22, 1937
- Running time: 62 minutes
- Country: United States
- Language: English

Stars Over Arizona is a 1937 American Western film directed by Robert North Bradbury and written by Robert Emmett Tansey. The film stars Jack Randall, Kathleen Eliot, Horace Murphy, Warner Richmond, Tom Herbert and Chick Hannan. The film was released on September 22, 1937, by Monogram Pictures.

== Cast ==
- Jack Randall as Jack Dawson
- Kathleen Eliot as Jane Manning
- Horace Murphy as Smokey
- Warner Richmond as Ace Carter
- Tom Herbert as Doc
- Chick Hannan as Yucca Bill Thompson
- Hal Price as Hashknife Holdin
- Ernie Adams as Jimmy the Weasel
- Charles Romas as Chuckawalla Joe
- Shuma Shermatova as Zona
- Jack Rockwell as Sheriff
- Forrest Taylor as Saunders
- Bob McKenzie as Judge
- Tex Palmer as Henchman
