= Showmen's Trade Review =

American trade magazine

Showmen's Trade Review was a weekly trade magazine for exhibitors and distributors of motion pictures published by Charles E. "Chick" Lewis (February 6, 1896 - October 22, 1953) out of offices in New York City.

== History and profile ==
The first issue was published on May 27, 1933, under the name Showmen's Round Table. The magazine was first published in the depths of the Great Depression. It chronicled the industry's struggles to cope with censorship under the Motion Picture Code, known as the Hays Code, and by churches, it told the story of America's battles and victory during World War II, and the return of prosperity during the late 1940s and 1950s. It told the story of U.S. popular culture from the film Hold Your Man with Clark Gable and Jean Harlow, featured in the first issue, through Jailhouse Rock starring Elvis Presley, featured in the final issue. Lewis changed the name to Showmen's Trade Review starting with the December 29, 1934, issue, and the magazine was published continuously through October 19, 1957, when it was sold to the Motion Picture Exhibitor.

The publisher's set of bound volumes is held in the collection of the Academy of Motion Picture Arts and Sciences in Los Angeles, California.

Showmen's Trade Review reflects the history of the United States through the motion picture industry and the films it produced in the period after silent films were replaced by black and white talkies, through the introduction of color, wide screens, drive-ins, CinemaScope and 3-D.

Editorially, Showmen's Trade Review covered films in production and their box office performance after release. It covered studio, labor, and industry politics; industry relations with church and government; government policy; court cases affecting the film industry; hirings and firings; profiles of business executives; showmanship, sales and promotion; theatre furnishings and equipment purchase and maintenance; theatre safety, lobby display; admission prices; and concessions, and the important relationships of the motion picture industry with radio and television. Articles about showmanship advised theatre owners and managers how best to present movies to attract large and loyal audiences.

Showmen's Trade Review was supported by advertisements from the movie studios for all their major motion pictures and many of the smaller films, as well as ads for theatre equipment such as film, sound and projection systems, seats, and ticket machines. Hotels, insurance companies, soft drink and liquor brands, and other publications also advertised.

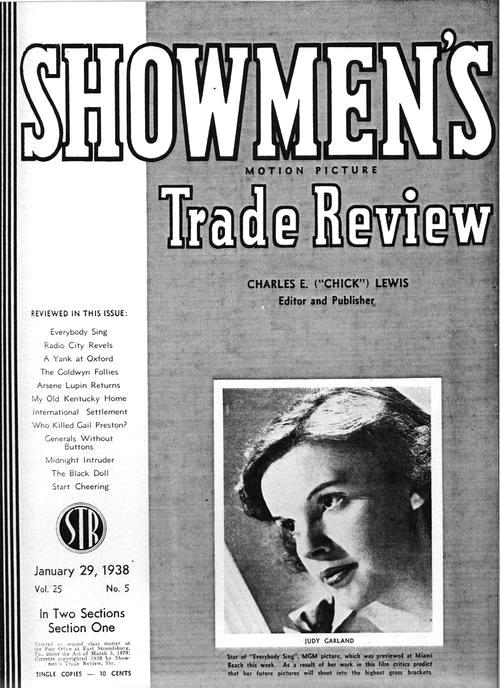
Showmen's Trade Review cover, January 29, 1938, featuring actress-singer Judy Garland, then starring in "Everybody Sing"

The magazine grew out of Chick Lewis' involvement in the early days of motion pictures.

Lewis was born February 6, 1896, in Brooklyn, New York. He began working in the movie industry in 1909 as a "studio boy" at the Independent Moving Pictures (IMP) company on 56th Street in New York City, according to his editorial in the September 28, 1935, issue of Showmen's Trade Review.

Independent Moving Pictures was a movie studio and production company founded in 1909 by Carl Laemmle. On June 8, 1912, IMP and other independent companies were absorbed into the newly incorporated Universal Film Manufacturing Company with Laemmle as president. It became one of the original major Hollywood movie studios, now Universal Pictures, a subsidiary of NBC Universal.

In 1928 he came up with the idea for a "Round Table," a publication for showmen that he said would break down "the barrier of silence between publication and subscriber." This was the genesis, but it took five years to grow into the magazine that became Showmen's Trade Review. The first issues were published under the name Showmen's Round Table.

After years of producing and promoting films and live stage shows, in the late 1920s and early 1930s, Lewis served as general manager for a circuit of movie theatres in Connecticut and New York. He called himself one of the "talkie pioneers". In 1928, Lewis was on the staff of the trade journal Motion Picture News.

From May 1933, the offices of Showmen's Round Table were located at 152 West 42nd St. By July 1933, the magazine also had an editorial office in Hollywood, California. In June 1935, an editorial office in London, England was added. By July 1946, the magazine added an office in Sydney, Australia.

With the July 28, 1934, issue, the New York editorial and advertising offices were moved to 1560 Broadway, New York City. With the December 29, 1934, issue, the name was changed to Showmen's Trade Review.

In early 1935, while the New York editorial and advertising offices remained at 1560 Broadway, a publication office at 305 Washington Street, Brooklyn was added. With the June 29, 1935, issue the publication office was moved to 34 N. Crystal St. East Stroudsburg, Pennsylvania.

With the September 28, 1935, issue, Showmen's Trade Review moved its editorial and advertising offices to their permanent location at Suite No. 1313 in the Paramount Building, 1501 Broadway on Times Square, New York City.

As editor and publisher, Lewis was determined to make his an independent publication. His first editorial in the May 27, 1933, edition stated, "We are under no obligation to anyone, except, you, the showman, the exhibitor and the manager. You represent THE most important phase of this business and you are entitled to a publication devoted to your interests, your problems and your affairs. ... We do not have to curry favor with any man or organization and before we do we'll call it a day and quit."

In November 1933, Lewis authored and published a guide to more efficient theatre operations. Entitled, "Systematizing Theatre Operation," it detailed how to buy films, build patronage and reduce overhead. Priced at $1, it was offered free of charge to subscribers of the magazine, who, at that time, paid $4 a year.

The early issues of Showmen's Trade Review featured an "Advance Dope" column with information about upcoming films such as The Masquerader with Ronald Colman, Dinner at Eight with Lionel Barrymore and Jean Harlow, Tugboat Annie with Marie Dressler and Wallace Beery, and Alice in Wonderland starring Charlotte Henry with Gary Cooper, Cary Grant, and W.C. Fields.

The column "Box Office Slant," which ran from the first issue through the last, was "a practical working analysis of current product as gauged by a showman's yardstick." It gave the cast, the plot and an analysis of five or six films per issue.

The struggle over censorship is clear in the "Box Office Slant" of August 25, 1934, which said of the film Iris March, "Sterling cast gives magnificent performance, but censorship kills famous plot." In the same issue, "Box Office Slant" said of Belle of the Nineties, starring blond bombshell Mae West, "The picture has been doctored plenty to meet with blue-nose requirements… But it's swell entertainment… It will pack 'em in… The censor boards have already sold the fans this one so it's a cinch to mop up."

Throughout the mid-1930s the motion picture industry was under attack from churches and the government. A Showmen's Trade Review article in the January 26, 1935, issue reported, "… the National Lutheran Council, which claims spiritual control over 2,000,000 souls, called upon the faithful to 'withhold patronage from pictures offensive to morality.'"

An article in the February 2, 1935, issue proclaimed, "Check up over the nation reveals that there are 50 bills aimed at the motion picture industry in Washington and in 15 state capitols."

Lewis displayed a sense of humor, featuring cartoons by Dick Kirschbaum from the first issue until the cartoonist died in November 1948. Kirschbaum was a theatre manager from New Jersey with a talent for cartooning. He went into newspaper work as the author of the first aviation column in a U.S. newspaper in "The Newark News." In the 1940s he did a series for Showmen's Trade Review called "Showmen's Silhouettes" featuring motion picture exhibitors.

Short subjects, ignored by other publications, had a column of their own in Showmen's Trade Review. Regional news was also a feature of the journal.

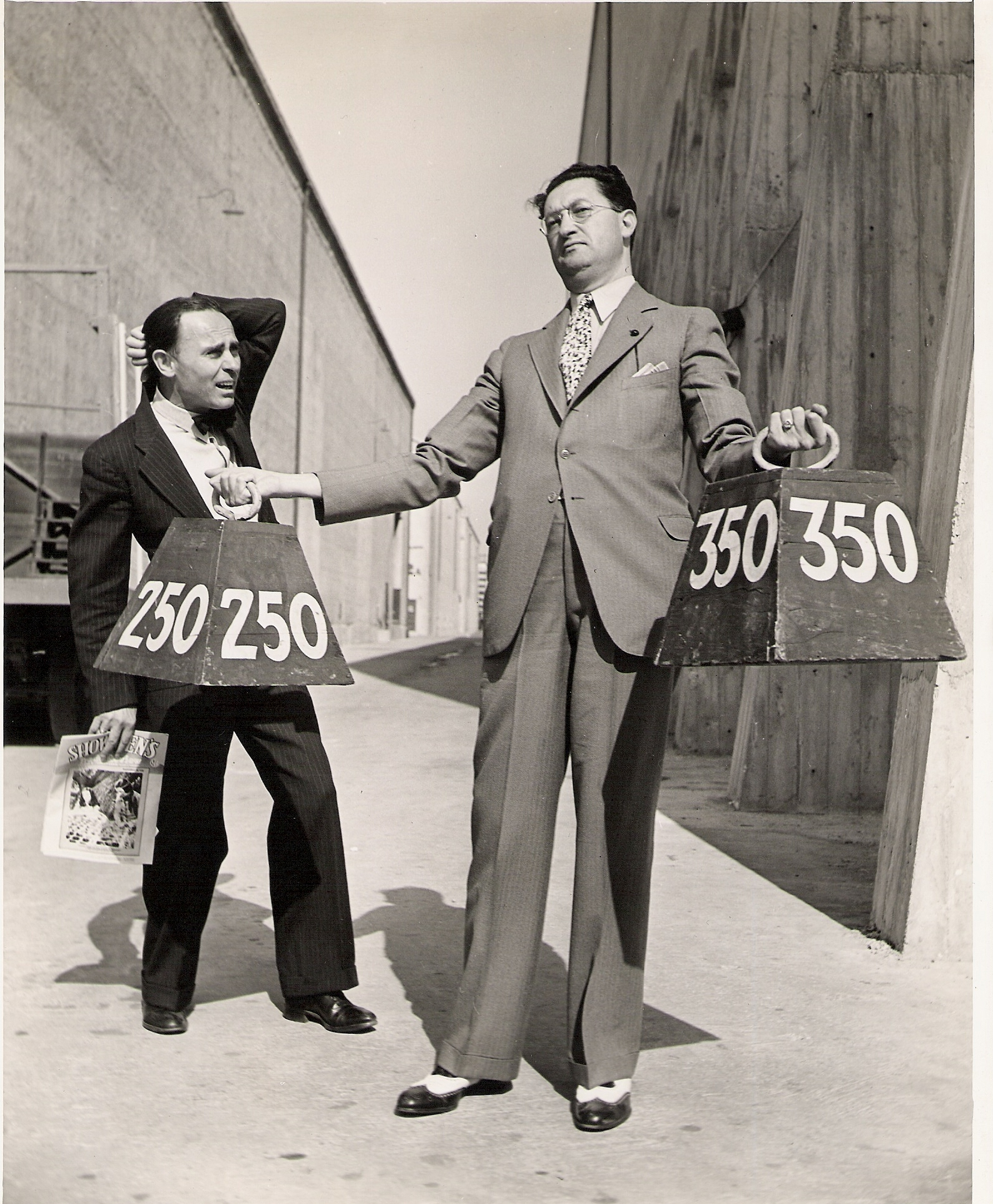
Showmen's Trade Review publisher and editor-in-chief Chick Lewis and STR west coast representative Joe Blair at Warner Studio, Burbank, California, 1936

Using the magazine as a platform, Lewis supported many charitable campaigns - to combat cancer, relief and resettlement of Jews after World War II (in the April 26, 1947, editorial), Brotherhood Week campaign of the National Conference of Christians and Jews, the United Cerebral Palsy Assn. He supported U.S. Treasury bond drives both during and after World War II.

Lewis was especially supportive of the Variety Clubs, which he called "The Heart of Showbusiness." From 1936, he used Showmen's Trade Review to advocate contributions to the Will Rogers Memorial Fund, which supported the Will Rogers Hospital at Saranac Lake, New York named after the popular comedian. The hospital helped show business people to regain their health, particularly from tuberculosis. From 1939, Lewis was a member of Variety Clubs and served as international press officer.

In January 1937, Showmen's Trade Review began publishing an annual called "Leaders of the Motion Picture Industry," that listed two groups of pictures: "top-flight box office pictures" and a "secondary group of money-makers." The first special issue offered complete information on these pictures from November 1, 1936, through October 21, 1937, prepared "by theatremen for theatremen," wrote Lewis, introducing the annual publication. "Leaders" recorded the results of an annual national poll of exhibitors, conducted and published by Showmen's Trade Review.

In 1937, Lewis published a book, "The Encyclopedia of Exploitation" by Bill Hendricks and Howard Waugh, a reference guide to 1,001 ways that theatre managers could bring more business in the door. It is found in libraries under Dewey Decimal Class 659.1 and is in the Library of Congress with the number: HF6161.T5 H4.

On February 4, 1950, Chick Lewis published another book by Hendricks, this time with Montgomery Orr, Showmanship in Advertising: The fundamentals of salesmanship in print.

Lewis explained his mission was to serve the motion picture industry, as on January 1, 1938, he wrote that it was, "… to give this industry a bigger, better, more useful and dependable trade paper without fear or favor and to continue our established policy as being the only trade paper dealing exclusively and realistically with the business of showmen and showmanship."

Intensely patriotic, Lewis was a liberal thinker, editorializing against church censorship of films, and in the December 17, 1938, issue lashing out at a Photoplay article critical of "movie stars who are not married but commit the horrible crime of living in homes close to or next to each other."

In December 1938, Photoplay published, "Hollywood's Unmarried Husbands and Wives." In it, Clark Gable and Carole Lombard, along with Robert Taylor and Barbara Stanwyck, among others, were called out for "behaving like they are married", even though they were not.

Lewis wrote, "Fan magazines appear to be run by people who have a tough time trying to find nice things to write about so go out of their way seeking nasty, and in many instances, libelous things to print."

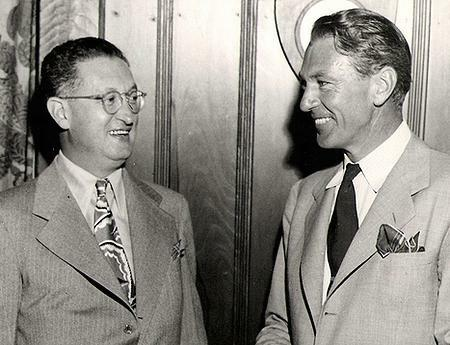
Showmen's Trade Review editor and publisher Charles E. "Chick" Lewis with actor Gary Cooper, Hollywood, California, August 30, 1944

A newsman as well as a showman, Lewis traveled often to Hollywood to meet with actors, producers and directors, theatre owners, as well as studio and industry executives. He attended industry conventions across the country.

The movie ads are some of the most interesting pages in Showmen's Trade Review. The ads range from simple black and white to elaborate full color, featuring photographs of the stars in action, as well as original promotional drawings and cartons. Ads used textured, heavy-weight paper, cut-outs, even cellophane windows.

In August 1939, STR carried a 10-page ad taken by exhibitors in honor of Universal Pictures in full color on heavy textured paper featuring such movies as "Destry Rides Again" with Marlene Dietrich and James Stewart. In March 1940, STR carried a two-page ad for the Alfred Hitchcock film "Rebecca" with Laurence Olivier and Joan Fontaine with a gold background on both pages. In April 1940, RKO ran a 10-page ad insert for seven movies, including "Abe Lincoln in Illinois" starring Raymond Massey. These multi-page ads from the major studios supported the magazine for decades.

By the 7th anniversary issue published on June 8, 1940, Showmen's Trade Review was an indispensable fixture on the motion picture scene. The anniversary issue was supported by full-page ads taken by: Alfred Hitchcock, Gary Cooper, Gabby Hayes, Tex Ritter, John Wayne, and Bing Crosby as well as Metro-Goldwyn-Mayer, Warner Bros., Technicolor, and Hal Roach Productions.

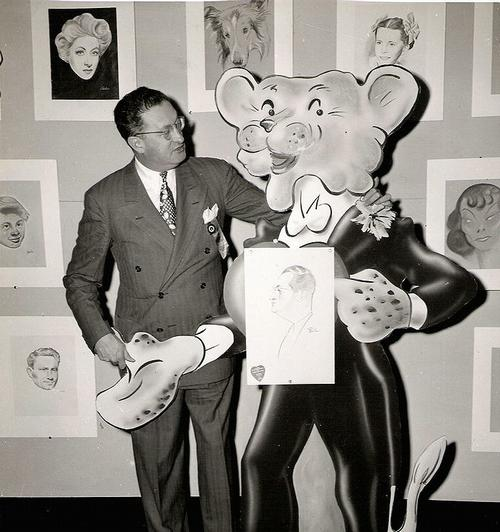
The MGM lion holds a drawing honoring Showmen's Trade Review editor and publisher Charles E. "Chick" Lewis for his work with Variety Clubs, Hollywood, California, May 1946

For the record: on March 15, 1941, the masthead stated that the magazine was, "Published every Friday by Showmen's Trade Review, Inc., 1501 Broadway, New York City. Telephone Bryant 9-5606. Charles E. "Chick" Lewis, editor and publisher; Tom Kennedy, associate editor; Robert Wile, managing editor. Offices were maintained in Hollywood, California; London, England; and Sydney, Australia. Subscription rates were $2 per year in the USA and Canada, $5 per year elsewhere."

Lewis saw great potential for motion pictures in the development of television, writing in his editorial of December 16, 1944, "The heavy turnout for the Television Broadcasters Association conference in New York this week proves how great is the interest in this new marvel of the science of electronics. The picture industry is certain to play a very big part in television in the future, and film men are not sleeping on the job but are keeping an eye on developments, as evidenced by the large number of picture people seen at the conference."

In his May 7, 1949, editorial Lewis wrote, "Television is competition, just as is anything that bids for the time people have to devote to entertainment. But with video's competition comes a new medium possessing a great potential for advertising the attractions of a picture through trailers shown right in the home."

All during World War II, Showmen's Trade Review stimulated showmen to raise funds for the war effort, through Victory Bonds, Red Cross War Fund Weeks, War Loan Campaigns, and for polio victims through the March of Dimes campaigns.

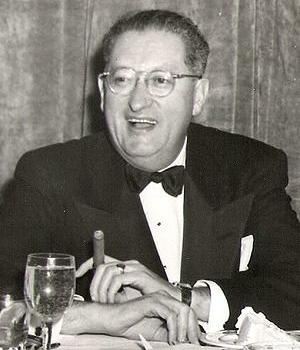
Showmen's Trade Review editor and publisher Chick Lewis at a testimonial dinner given in his honor at the Hotel Astor, NYC, January 11, 1952

In April 1949, Variety Clubs International assumed operation of the Will Rogers Memorial Hospital. In 1954, the year after his death, a new wing was opened at the Will Rogers' Memorial Hospital, dedicated to Chick Lewis, who served as executive vice-president of the institution. The dedication was made during the annual visit of the Variety Clubs Board of Directors to the sanitarium.

Ever the showman, in his editorial of June 4, 1949, Lewis wrote, "SELL THE PICTURE: If the show is good enough to book, it's worth all the showmanship energy a theatreman can produce with every bit of know-how, inspiration and perspiration of which he's capable."

Lewis presented industry news with optimism, conviction, and respect for his readers. In his editorial of August 16, 1952, he wrote of, "STR's editorial policy of presenting facts without fury - the full facts with the pertinent details needed to interpret them so that the reader can form his own conclusions."

Lewis died of a sudden heart attack at his home in Scarsdale, New York on October 22, 1953. His widow, Margie Rita Lewis, took over as publisher and kept the magazine going until October 1957, when she sold it to the Motion Picture Exhibitor.
