= Trapped in the Sky (film) =

- Film poster
- Directed by: Lewis D. Collins
- Written by: Eric Taylor; Gordon Rigby
- Produced by: Larry Darmour
- Starring: Jack Holt; Ralph Morgan; Katherine DeMille
- Cinematography: James S. Brown Jr.
- Edited by: Dwight Caldwell
- Production company: Larry Darmour Productions
- Distributed by: Columbia Pictures
- Release date: June 1, 1939
- Running time: 61 minutes
- Country: United States
- Language: English

Trapped in the Sky (aka Army Spy and Sabotage) is a 1939 American thriller film directed by Lewis D. Collins and produced by Larry Darmour for Columbia Pictures. The film stars Jack Holt, Ralph Morgan and Katherine DeMille. Holt is the "flyboy" who is trying to find the saboteurs of a "silent" aircraft. The plot device of a "noiseless" or stealthy aircraft is a familiar theme in aviation films of the period, including The Sky Ranger (1921), The Silent Flier (1926) and Eagle of the Night (1928). (Note: Reviewer Hal Erickson noted, "For a man who was reportedly deathly afraid of flying, Jack Holt certainly made more than his share of aviation pictures.")

== Plot ==
Inventor Walter Fielding (Holmes Herbert) has been developing a new type of aircraft that is "noiseless". He offers the United States government first option on his invention. When William Fornay (C. Henry Gordon), a foreign agent, offers him three times the army's price, Fielding decides to sabotage the government tests, thus enabling him to sell his patent to the highest bidder.

After the initial test flight ends in a crash and the death of its pilot, Lieutenant Gray (Regis Toomey), United States Army Air Corps flyer Major Roston (Jack Holt) begins to suspect sabotage. Roston decides to go under cover to catch the culprits. He first stages a court martial and fakes his resentment of the army and soon Roston is contacted by enemy agent Carol Rayder (Katherine DeMille). The trail soon goes cold when Carol and her employer, Joseph Dure (Ivan Lebedeff), are found murdered.

While investigating Carol's murder, Roston learns that Fornay may be involved in the aircraft's mysterious failure. Deducing that Fielding must also be implicated in the sabotage of the test flight, Roston lures Fielding into taking a test flight with him. In the air, he threatens to crash the aircraft, forcing a confession from the inventor.

== Cast ==
- Jack Holt as Major Roston
- Ralph Morgan as Colonel Whalen
- Paul Everton as General Mooyp
- Katherine DeMille as Carol Rayder
- C. Henry Gordon as William Fornay
- Sidney Blackmer as Mann
- Ivan Lebedeff as Joseph Dure
- Regis Toomey as Lt. Gray
- Holmes Herbert as Walter Fielding
- Guy D'Ennery as Henry

== Production ==
The working titles of Army Spy and Sabotage reflected a heightened atmosphere of international intrigue in the immediate period before World War II. Principal photography on Trapped in the Sky, took place from December 16 to December 30, 1938.

== Reception ==
Aviation film historian Michael Paris in From the Wright Brothers to Top Gun: Aviation, Nationalism, and Popular Cinema (1995) considered Trapped in the Sky, a re-working of The Great Air Robbery (1919) a silent two-reel feature.

Aviation film historian James H. Farmer in Celluloid Wings: The Impact of Movies on Aviation (1984) dismissed Trapped in the Sky as a "low-budget action mystery" film.
