= Fred Sherman (actor) =

American actor

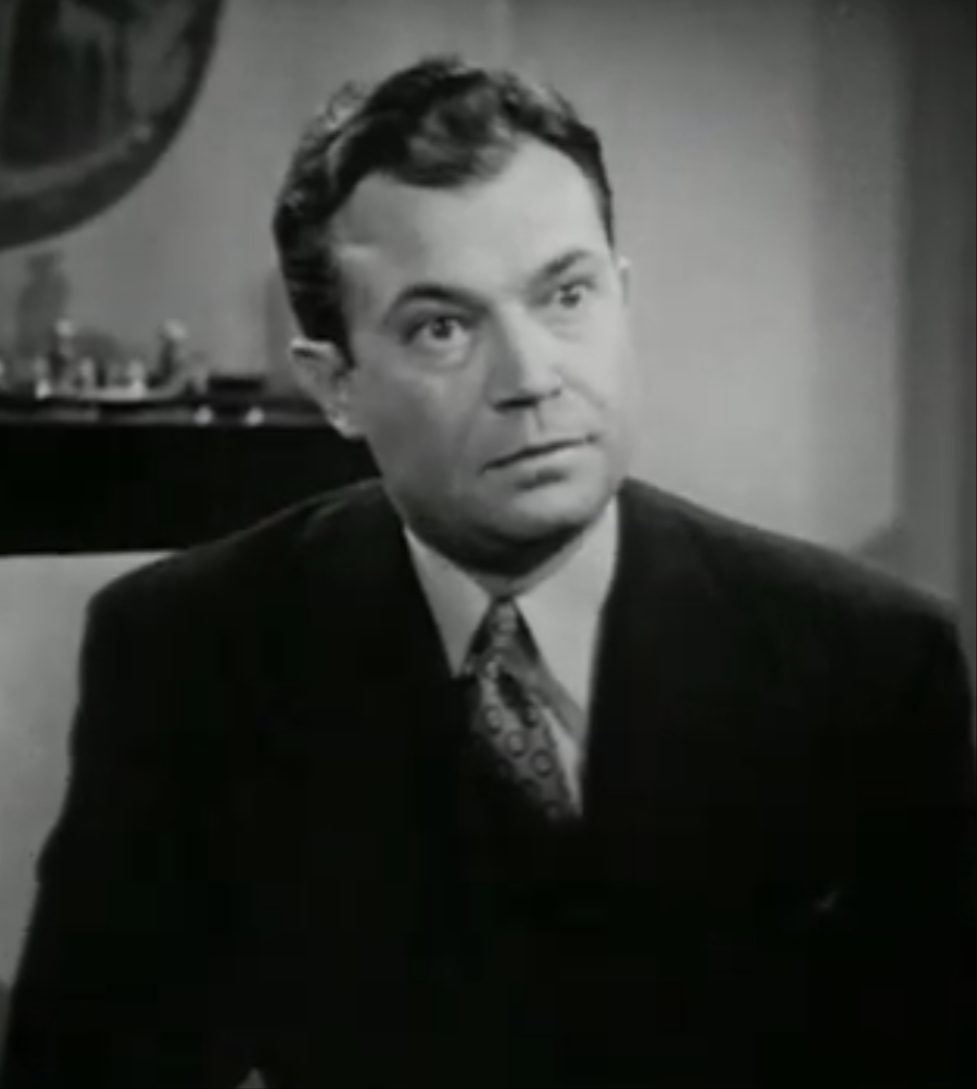
- Sherman in Too Many Women (1942)
- Born: Clarence R. Kolegraff; May 14, 1905
- Died: May 20, 1969 (aged 64)
- Occupation: Actor
- Years active: 1942–1962
- Spouse: Claire Carleton (m. 1944)

Clarence Raymond "Clem" Kolegraff (born May 14, 1905 – May 20, 1969); known professionally as Fred Sherman, was an American actor.

== Early years ==
Sherman was born in South Dakota, the son of Anna (née Haider) and Edward Kolegraff, He graduated from Central High School in Minneapolis, Minnesota.

== Career ==
After seeing his first stage show, he went to San Francisco and took a character part with an amateur stock company and acted in several touring companies.

His television credits included Perry Mason, I Love Lucy, Bonanza, Leave it to Beaver, Wagon Train (several episodes in 1959), Adventures of Superman, and The Andy Griffith Show, on which he appeared in two episodes as dry cleaning store owner Fred Goss—he was featured as a beau of Aunt Bee in "Wedding Bells for Aunt Bee" and in "Jailbreak" in which he provided key information to help Andy and Barney capture two criminals.

His credited film roles included Too Many Women (1942); Shepherd of the Ozarks (1942); Hi, Neighbor (1942); *Wrecking Crew; Chain Lightning (1950); A Lust to Kill (1958); Alaska Passage (1959); Seven Men from Now (1956); and Why Must I Die? (1960);The Tall T (1957);

== Personal life and death ==
On February 14, 1944, Sherman married actress Claire Carleton in Hollywood. He died May 20, 1969, at the Motion Picture Country Hospital in Woodland Hills, Los Angeles, California, at the age of 64.
