= Dark Streets of Cairo =

1940 film

- Theatrical release poster
- Directed by: Leslie Kardos; Seward Webb
- Written by: Alex Gottlieb
- Produced by: Joseph G. Sanford
- Starring: Sigrid Gurie; Ralph Byrd; Eddie Quillan; George Zucco; Katherine DeMille
- Edited by: Paul Landres
- Music by: Charles Previn; H. J. Salter
- Production company: Universal Pictures
- Release date: December 2, 1940 (New York opening)
- Running time: 59 minutes
- Country: United States
- Language: English

Dark Streets of Cairo is a 1940 American mystery film directed by László Kardos and starring Sigrid Gurie, Ralph Byrd, Eddie Quillan, George Zucco and Katherine DeMille. The central plot of the film concerns " [A group of] jewel smugglers in Cairo [who] try to pin their crimes on a kidnapped baron".

== Cast ==
- Sigrid Gurie as Ellen Stephens
- Ralph Byrd as Dennis Martin
- Eddie Quillan as Jerry Jones
- George Zucco as Abbadi
- Katherine DeMille as Shari Abbadi
- Rod La Rocque as Inspector Joachim
- Sig Arno as Khattab
- Yolande Donlan as Maggie Malone
- Lloyd Corrigan as Baron Stephens
- Henry Brandon as Hussien
- Nestor Paiva as Ahmend
- Dick Botiller as Nardo
- Steven Geray as Bellboy
- Wright Kramer as Professor Wyndham
- Frank Lackteen as A Phony Blind Beggar (uncredited)
