= The Judge (1949 film) =

1949 film

- Directed by: Elmer Clifton
- Screenplay by: Anson Bond; Samuel Newman; Elmer Clifton
- Story by: Julius Long
- Produced by: Anson Bond
- Starring: Milburn Stone; Katherine DeMille; Paul Guilfoyle
- Cinematography: Ray Foster; Benjamin H. Kline
- Edited by: Fred Maguire
- Music by: Gene Lanham
- Production company: Emerald Productions
- Distributed by: Film Classics
- Release date: January 31, 1949
- Running time: 69 minutes
- Country: United States
- Language: English

The Judge is a 1949 American crime film directed by Elmer Clifton and starring Milburn Stone, Katherine DeMille and Paul Guilfoyle.

== Cast ==
- Milburn Stone as Martin Strang
- Katherine DeMille as Lucille Strang
- Paul Guilfoyle as William Jackson
- Stanley Waxman as Dr. James Anderson
- Norman Budd as James Tillton
- Jonathan Hale as Judge Allan J. Brooks
- John Hamilton as Lt. Edwards
- Joseph Forte as District Attorney
- Jess Kirkpatrick as Patrolman Patrick Riley
- Herb Vigran as Reporter
- Barney Phillips as Reporter
- Charles Williams as Reporter
- Tom Holland as Court Photographer
- Bob Jellison as Court Clerk

== Bibliography ==
- Fetrow, Alan G. Feature Films, 1940-1949: a United States Filmography. McFarland, 1994.
