= John Moore Lester =

British cleric

- Born: 4 September 1851; Bombay, Bengal Presidency, India
- Died: 24 December 1919 (aged 68); Litchborough, Northamptonshire, England
- Education: Rugby School
- Alma mater: University College, Oxford
- Occupation: Cleric
- Spouses: Amy Hunt; Mary Julia Horton
- Father: Frederick Parkinson Lester

John Moore Lester (4 September 1851 – 24 December 1919) was a British priest who served as Rector of Litchborough and Rural Dean of Lichfield. He was the son of Frederick Lester. Lester was a clergyman and academic and grandfather of James Shaw, Baron Kilbrandon, Philippa Lester, the second wife of Cecil Davidge, and biological grandfather of Katherine DeMille.

== Early life ==
Lester was born in Bombay in the Bombay Presidency, to Frederick Lester and Charlotte Pratt Fyvie, niece of the Baroness Bradford. He went to school at Rugby School and received an M.A from University College, Oxford.

== Clerical career ==
Lester began as vicar of Stony Stratford, Buckinghamshire, from 1880 to 1884, he went on to be vicar of the Holy Trinity Church in Ayr in 1884 but was then appointed vicar of Shifnal in Shropshire and Rural Dean in the diocese of Lichfield on 12 February 1891. Lester also helped his friend, Chauncy Maples, Bishop of Likoma, with his biography.

On 26 May 1903 he was appointed vicar of Yarcombe in Devon. He was then appointed to the Rectory of St. Leonard's, Bridgnorth on Friday, 13 October 1905. He was finally appointed Rector of Litchborough in Northamptonshire.

== Family ==
Lester married Amy Hunt, daughter of John Hunt on 26 June 1877 at the Lancaster Gate Christ Church, Westminster. They had nine children together, including Gladys Elizabeth, who married James Edward Shaw and was mother to Charles James Dalrymple Shaw, Baron Kilbrandon and Edward Gabriel, MC (1887-1917), who married Cecile Colani and was father to Katherine Lester DeMille.

Lester's first wife died on 30 October 1896, he married Mary Julia Horton, daughter of Samuel Lewis Horton of Park House, Shifnal in 1898, her father was the grandson of the engraver Lewis Pingo. They had a further three children together, including Peter Francis Lester (1903–85), who married Gertrude Hewett, niece of Sir John Hewett and was mother to Philippa Lester, wife of Cecil Vere Davidge.

Mary was the niece of Thomas Lowndes Bullock and cousin of Guy Henry Bullock and Sir Claud Severn. She died in 1947.

Lester died on 24 December 1919 at Rectory, Litchborough, Northamptonshire, England.
