= In Old Caliente =

1939 film

- Directed by: Joseph Kane
- Written by: Norman Houston (story); Norman Houston (screenplay) and Gerald Geraghty (screenplay)
- Produced by: Joseph Kane
- Starring: Roy Rogers
- Cinematography: William Nobles
- Edited by: Edward Mann
- Distributed by: Republic Pictures
- Release date: June 19, 1939
- Running time: 57 minutes 54 minutes (US edited version)
- Country: United States
- Language: English

In Old Caliente is a 1939 American Western film directed by Joseph Kane and starring Roy Rogers.

== Plot ==
Set after California's Statehood but before the American Civil War, Roy Rogers is working for a wealthy Spanish family. One of their men is secretly betraying the arrival of targets of opportunity to a group of Anglo American bandits but puts the blame on Roy.

The film has several unusual sequences such as having several scenes shot on a beach and having bandits after a giant sphere of gold. There is only one mention made of Caliente, California.

== Cast ==
- Roy Rogers as Roy Rogers
- Lynne Roberts as Jean Marshall
- George "Gabby" Hayes as "Gabby" Whittaker
- Jack La Rue as Sujarno
- Katherine DeMille as Rita Vargas
- Frank Puglia as Don José Vargas
- Harry Woods as 'Curly' Calkins
- Paul Marion as Carlos Vargas
- Ethel Wales as Aunt Felicia
- Merrill McCormick as Pedro

== Soundtrack ==
- Roy Rogers - "Sundown on the Rangeland" (Written by Fred Rose)
- Roy Rogers and George "Gabby" Hayes - "We're Not Coming Out Tonight" (Written by Walter G. Samuels)
- Roy Rogers - "The Moon, She Will Be Shining Tonight" (Written by Walter G. Samuels)
- Roy Rogers - "Ride On Vaquero"
