= Jess Kirkpatrick =

American film and television actor (1897–1976)

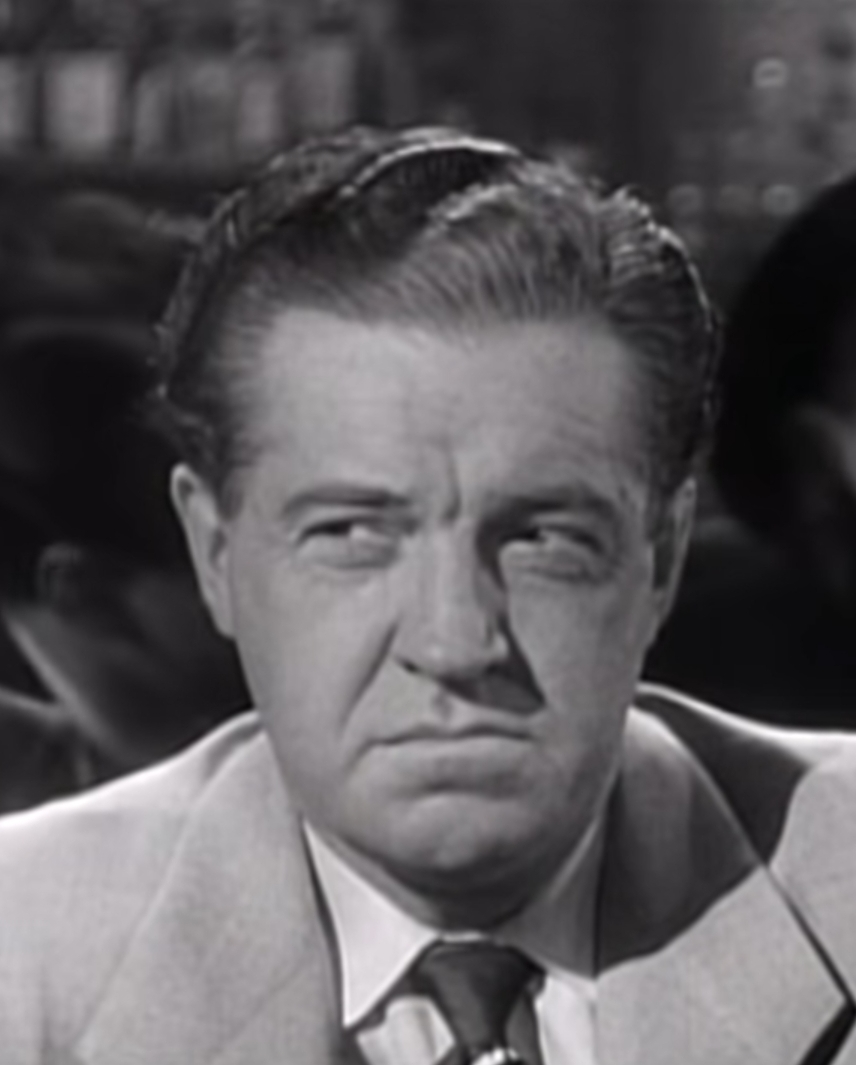
- Kirkpatrick in D.O.A (1949)
- Born: Jesse Bertram Kirkpatrick; October 2, 1897; Champaign County, Illinois, U.S.
- Died: August 9, 1976 (aged 78); La Jolla, California, U.S.
- Education: University of Illinois
- Occupations: Film and television actor
- Spouse: Ruth Kirkpatrick

Jesse Bertram Kirkpatrick (October 2, 1897 – August 9, 1976) was an American film and television actor.

== Life and career ==
Kirkpatrick was born in Champaign County, Illinois. He attended the University of Illinois, where he played as a halfback in football in the 1920s. He was named in Walter Eckersall's All-American team and in football coach Robert Zuppke's all-time backfield. He supported himself at the university by playing as a jazz dummer in a student band. He was also a singer, appearing with Earl Burtnett's orchestra in 1931, and as a singer and master of ceremonies with Harold Stokes on the WGN radio program Melodies from the Sky.

Kirkpatrick worked as an announcer for the radio broadcasting station WGN for ten years. Kirkpatrick moved to Hollywood, California, starting his screen career playing a broadcaster in the 1946 film My Dog Shep. He also played Patrick Riley in the 1949 film The Judge. He played a bartender in five episodes in the western television series Johnny Ringo. He appeared in films such as D.O.A., The Captive City, Sweethearts on Parade, Star in the Dust, The Private War of Major Benson, Alaska Passage, Police Dog Story, Outside the Law, Somebody Up There Likes Me, The Moonlighter, The Mob, Man of a Thousand Faces, Day of the Badman, Ten North Frederick and A Millionaire for Christy. He also guest-starred in numerous television programs including Gunsmoke, Bonanza, The Fugitive, The Life and Legend of Wyatt Earp, Petticoat Junction, Bachelor Father, Wagon Train, Perry Mason, Alfred Hitchcock Presents, McHale's Navy, The Real McCoys, Leave It to Beaver, Tales of Wells Fargo, Death Valley Days, 77 Sunset Strip, Man with a Camera and The Beverly Hillbillies.

Kirkpatrick retired from acting in 1969, last appearing in the CBS sitcom television series Mayberry R.F.D..

== Death ==
Kirkpatrick died on August 9, 1976 of a heart attack while playing handball with three doctors in La Jolla, California, at the age of 78.

== Selected Television ==
- Alfred Hitchcock Presents (1956) (Season 2 Episode 9: "Crack of Doom") – Card Player
- Leave It to Beaver (1958) (Season 1 Episode 32: "Beaver’s Old Friend") – City garbage collector
- Gunsmoke (1956) (Season 2 Episode 7: "How To Cure A Friend") – Town Barber Mr. Teeters
- The Alfred Hitchcock Hour (1964) (Season 2 Episode 26: "Ten Minutes from Now") - Thomas Grindley
