= Drift Fence =

1936 film

- Theatrical release poster
- Directed by: Otho Lovering
- Written by: Zane Grey (story The Drift Fence); Robert Yost (screenplay) and Stuart Anthony (screenplay)
- Produced by: Harold Hurley (producer); William T. Lackey (associate producer); Henry Herzbrun (executive producer) (uncredited)
- Starring: See below
- Cinematography: Virgil Miller
- Edited by: Everett Douglas
- Distributed by: Paramount Pictures
- Release date: February 14, 1936
- Running time: 56 minutes
- Country: United States
- Language: English

Drift Fence (reissued as Texas Desperadoes) is a 1936 American Western film, directed by Otho Lovering and released by Paramount Pictures.

The film's sets were designed by art director David S. Garber.

== Cast ==
- Buster Crabbe as "Slinger" Dunn
- Katherine DeMille as Molly Dunn
- Tom Keene as Jim Travis
- Benny Baker as Jim Traft
- Leif Erickson as Curley Prentice
- Stanley Andrews as Clay Jackson
- Richard Carle as Sheriff Peter Bingham
- Irving Bacon as "Windy" Watkins, Traft Foreman
- Effie Ellsler as Grandma Dunn
- Jan Duggan as Carrie Bingham, Sheriff Bingham's sister
- Walter Long as Bev Wilson, Neighbor
- Richard Alexander as Seth Haverly, Jackson Henchman
- Budd Fine as Sam Haverly, Jackson Henchman
- Chester Gan as Clarence – Ranch Cook
- Jack Pennick as Weary – Camp Cook
