= Block Busters =

1944 film by Wallace Fox

- Directed by: Wallace Fox
- Written by: Houston Branch (writer)
- Produced by: Jack Dietz (producer); Sam Katzman (producer); Barney A. Sarecky (associate producer)
- Starring: Leo Gorcey; Huntz Hall
- Cinematography: Marcel Le Picard
- Edited by: Carl Pierson
- Production company: Monogram Pictures
- Release date: July 22, 1944
- Running time: 60 minutes
- Country: United States
- Language: English

Block Busters is a 1944 American comedy film directed by Wallace Fox and starring the East Side Kids. It was produced and released by Monogram Pictures.

== Plot ==
After an afternoon of playing baseball, Muggs McGinnis and the East Side Kids gang arrive at the door of their clubhouse, where realtor Higgins is removing their "East Side Club" sign. Higgins explains that the owner of the place plans to rent it to some "respectable" tenants. When Muggs learns that the new tenants are due to examine the place at noon the following day, he plans to frighten them away by picking a fight with Butch and the Five Pointers, a rival gang.

The next day, Glimpy and Pinky scribble a challenge to the Five Pointers on the sidewalk. When Butch and his gang read the message, "The East Siders dare you to fight," they seek out their challengers. Meanwhile, Muggs and the gang see Higgins supervising the delivery of some window boxes that he ordered to replace the weatherbeaten flowerpots that are lining the street. Pretending to be helpful, the gang offers to dispose of the old pots, but instead, stack them against a nearby wall.

Soon, the prospective tenants, an elderly woman named Amelia Norton and her French-born grandson Jean arrive, and Higgins greets them. Just then, Butch and his gang show up and take the bait, hurling the empty pots at Muggs and his gang, while a shocked Amelia looks on. When Jean critiques Muggs's fighting style, Muggs begins to brawl with him. After they are both arrested, the judge tells Muggs that he will hold each one accountable for the other's behavior.

Later, Jean goes to the clubhouse to make sure that Muggs is staying out of trouble, and the gang teaches him some American games. Afterward, Jean invites the gang over for tea, and they meet snobby Irma Treadwell and her mother Virginia. When Muggs and Glimpy see a black sedan pick up Jean, who is dressed like Count Dracula, they decide to follow him. The car takes Jean to a costume party at a chic club, where Muggs wins 'best costume' for being dressed as a Bowery tough.

Meanwhile, Tobey Dunn, an ailing member of Muggs's baseball team, is told by his doctor that a stay in the country would cure him, but Tobey's family can't afford the trip. Later, Danny (Jimmy Strand) sees his girlfriend Jinx dancing with Jean at a party, so the gang decides to crash it. When Glimpy tells Danny that he saw Jinx riding on the back of Jean's bicycle, Danny tries to fight with his rival, but Muggs intervenes.

The gang then goes to the field to play baseball, and Jean quickly learns the game. At the clubhouse, Amelia thanks the gang for allowing Jean to play on the team. During the team's next game, Lippman, the team's sponsor, tells the gang that if they win, he will send them all to summer camp in the Catskill Mountains. With the bases loaded, Jean hits a home run and wins the game, and Tobey is awarded his trip to the country.

== Cast ==
=== The East Side Kids ===
- Leo Gorcey as Ethelbert 'Muggs' McGinnis
- Huntz Hall as Glimpy
- Gabriel Dell as Skinny (a.k.a. Pinky)
- Jimmy Strand as Danny
- Bill Chaney as Tobey

=== Additional cast ===
- Billy Benedict as Butch
- Fred Pressel as Jean
- Roberta Smith as Jinx
- Noah Beery as Judge
- Harry Langdon as Higgins
- Minerva Urecal as Amelia Roget
- Kay Marvis as Irma Treadwell
- Tom Herbert as Meyer
- Bernard Gorcey as Lippman
- Charles Murray Jr. as Umpire
- Jack Gilman as Batter
- Robert F. Hill as Doctor (uncredited)

Specialties by:

- The Ashburns
- Jimmie Noone and His Orchestra

== Production ==
Monogram Pictures was a useful outlet for screen actors who wanted to produce their own films. Leo Gorcey, Buck Jones, Sidney Toler, Kay Francis, and Arthur Lake all had releasing arrangements with Monogram at one time or another. So did Lou Costello, who produced Monogram's musical comedy A WAVE, a WAC, and a Marine (released 1944), and was set to direct the East Side Kids in Block Busters under the pseudonym "Lucas Tello". Costello was off the screen at the time (late 1943), idle with rheumatic fever, and his behind-the-scenes activity at Monogram may have been his way of keeping busy without exposing himself to the demands of physical comedy. When his Monogram sideline came to light, he shrugged it off as a joke. A Variety report headlined "Costello's Director Gag (Lucas Tello) Upsets Three Studios" explained: "It started as a gag at Monogram and wound up in a case of jitters at Universal, where the execs went into an apoplectic huddle and declared it wasn't true... Story originated in a kidding way among the East Siders, who are friends of the chubby comic. Add to that, Trem Carr, Monogram producer, is one of Costello's neighbors. The gag grew until it reached the ears of Universal" and MGM, both being Costello's principal employers. So ended Lou Costello's brief tenure at Monogram.

Block Busters was one of the few East Side Kids movies in which Gabriel Dell plays a member of the gang (as opposed to a character part or a villainous role). It is Bill Chaney's only film as an East Side Kid and the last film released in Harry Langdon's lifetime. There are specialty performances by bandleader Jimmie Noone and His Orchestra and exhibition dancers The Ashburns. Leo Gorcey's wife Kay Marvis has a supporting role as Irma Treadwell. In addition, his father Bernard Gorcey has a role as the gang's baseball team sponsor, Lippman.

Although many of the East Side Kids pictures are in the public domain, Block Busters is not. Rights are currently held by Paramount Pictures.

== See also ==
- List of American films of 1944
