= The Crusades (1935 film) =

1935 film by Cecil B. DeMille

- Film poster
- Directed by: Cecil B. DeMille
- Written by: Harold Lamb; Waldemar Young; Dudley Nichols; Uncredited: Charles Brackett; Howard Higgin; Jeanie Macpherson
- Produced by: Cecil B. DeMille
- Starring: Loretta Young; Henry Wilcoxon; Ian Keith; C. Aubrey Smith; Katherine DeMille; Joseph Schildkraut; Alan Hale
- Cinematography: Victor Milner
- Edited by: Anne Bauchens
- Music by: Rudolph G. Kopp
- Distributed by: Paramount Pictures
- Release dates: August 21, 1935 (New York City, premiere); October 25, 1935 (US)
- Running time: 125 minutes
- Country: United States
- Language: English
- Budget: $1.4 million
- Box office: $1.7 million

The Crusades is a 1935 American historical adventure drama film directed and produced by Cecil B. DeMille for Paramount Pictures, loosely based on the life of King Richard I of England during the Third Crusade, and his marriage to Berengaria of Navarre. The film stars Henry Wilcoxon as Richard, Loretta Young as Berengaria, and Ian Keith as Saladin, along with C. Aubrey Smith, Katherine DeMille, Joseph Schildkraut and Alan Hale Sr. in supporting roles.

The film premiered in New York City on August 21, 1935, and went into general release on October 25. It was a critical and commercial success, earning nominations for Best Foreign Film at the 3rd Venice International Film Festival, and an Academy Award nomination for Best Cinematography (Victor Milner), which it lost to Hal Mohr's work on A Midsummer Night's Dream.

== Plot ==
The film takes many of its elements and main characters from the Third Crusade, which was prompted by the Saracen capture of Jerusalem and the crusader states in the Holy Land in A.D. 1187. The character of King Richard the Lionheart is a man of action but little thought. A hermit from Jerusalem arrives in Europe and starts gathering support for a Crusade. The hermit convinces a number of European rulers to travel to Jerusalem in order to bring the Holy City into Christian hands. Richard enlists in order to avoid an arranged betrothal to the King of France's sister, Princess Alice of France, but is followed by the Countess on the Crusade. A plot is laid against Richard's life by his brother Prince John and Conrad, Marquis of Montferrat. En route to the war, Richard meets Berengaria, Princess of Navarre. In order to get food for his men, Richard reluctantly marries her in exchange for her father's cattle and grain. Berengaria is forced to accompany Richard to the Holy Land.

During the Crusaders' attempts to get past the walls of Acre, the allies assemble in conference, but in disarray. Richard receives word that his brother John has seized the throne of England. Richard's ally, Philip II of France, is enraged at Richard's rejection of his sister Alice, but Richard defies Philip and the other troubled allies by proclaiming Berengaria Queen of England. The Christian leaders meet in parley with the Muslim Sultan and leader Saladin. Saladin is struck by Berengaria's beauty and bravery in supporting her husband. However, he rejects any truce with the Crusaders, and declares that the arrogant Richard will "never pass the gates of Jerusalem."

Berengaria is fearful that her presence in camp is causing disloyalty among Richard's allies, in particular the powerful French King Philip, and may harm their holy quest. Seeking death, she enters no man's land between the lines, only to be wounded and captured by the forces of Saladin. The hermit, the Christian "holy man" who had preached the Crusade, also is captured. Saladin escapes the siege, and after finding Berengaria wounded, brings her to Jerusalem to care for her, with admiration and growing affection. Not knowing this Richard and the Crusaders storm Acre to save the Queen of England.

The internal plot against Richard's life is hatched by Conrad and disloyal soldiers. Conrad reveals his plot to Saladin, expecting to be rewarded. Appalled by Conrad's treachery, Saladin orders Conrad to be immediately executed. Berengaria offers herself to Saladin if he will intervene and save Richard's life. Saladin sends a few of his soldiers to warn Richard who is searching the battle field at night for the body of a friend. Conrad's men attack Richard but are defeated by Saladin's soldiers who take the English King to Saladin. Richard and Saladin agree to a truce and the gates of Jerusalem are opened to all Christians with the exception of Richard, in keeping with Saladin's earlier promise. After losing his kingship, his wife and the opportunity to see the Holy City, Richard prays for the first time, asking God for him to be reunited with his wife. Richard encounters Berengaria on her way to the Holy City. He admits his mistakes and Berengaria tells him that Saladin has freed her along with the other Christian captives. Berengaria proceeds alone toward Jerusalem to visit the Holy City and promises to return to him.

== Cast ==
- Loretta Young as Berengaria of Navarre
- Henry Wilcoxon as Richard the Lionheart
- Ian Keith as Saladin
- C. Aubrey Smith as The Hermit
- Katherine DeMille as Alice of France
- Joseph Schildkraut as Conrad of Montferrat
- Alan Hale as Blondel de Nesle
- C. Henry Gordon as Philip of France
- George Barbier as Sancho of Navarre
- Montagu Love as The Blacksmith
- Ramsay Hill as John of England
- Lumsden Hare as Robert of Leicester
- Maurice Murphy as Alan, Richard's squire
- William Farnum as Hugo of Burgundy
- Hobart Bosworth as Frederick Barbarossa
- Pedro de Cordoba as Karakush
- Mischa Auer as Monk
- Albert Conti as Leopold of Austria
- Sven Hugo Borg as Sverre of Norway
- Paul Sotoff as Michael of Russia
- Fred Malatesta as William of Sicily
- Hans von Twardowski as Nicholas of Hungary
- Anna Demetrio as Duenna
- Perry Askam as Soldier
- Vallejo Gantner as Albéric Clément, Marshal of France
- John Carradine as Wise Man
- Jason Robards Sr. as Amir
- J. Carrol Naish as Slave Seller
- Sam Flint as Knight Hospitaller

== Cultural context ==
Lorraine K. Stock writes in Hollywood in the Holy Land, in her chapter "Now Starring in the Third Crusade" that Crusading films have been used by European and American countries to spread a political or cultural agenda. One way with which this is done is through the main Crusading "heroes" such as Richard the Lionheart and main antagonist Saladin. Many films have used the relationship between Richard I and Saladin. In this particular film the relationship between Richard I and Saladin is connected not only by the conflict of the Crusade but "an improbable, if entertaining, erotic triangle" with Berengaria of Navarre. Stock notes that this relationship and the events which occur can be seen as a reaction to events after the First World War and especially America's isolationism. For example, Richard the Lionheart at first does not want to get married, so he goes on Crusade despite showing signs of not being religious. Berengaria can also be seen as a "medieval League of Nations" when negotiations between Saladin and Richard I occur at the end of the movie.

=== Depiction of Arab and Muslim characters ===
A main concern for such films is the way Muslims and Crusaders are portrayed. Throughout the film Stock notes that there are a negative portrayals of Saladin and the Muslims. For instance Stock notes that the Crusaders are all dressed in mail armor with the cross upon their chests, while Saladin and the Saracens are dressed mainly in "flowing robes of luxury fabrics" and "silken sashes". The Saracens are shown as oriental but also "exotically feminized" according to Stock. Another scene has the Saracens shoot a Crusader messenger, who demands surrender of the city, with one of them wearing a helmet with devil horns upon it. There are other moments in which the Europeans mention devilry or call Muslims infidels. Stock says DeMille established "the stereotypes of Richard and Saladin that subsequent films would repeat…".

However, Saladin is also depicted as an honorable and respectable man, in comparison to the treacherous European Christian nobles who try to undermine Richard. In "Islam, Muslims and Arabs in the Popular Hollywood Cinema", Anton K. Kozlovic writes "The Crusades was not as enthusiastically received in the West as DeMille would have liked probably because it showed the good and noble side of the Muslims and contrasted it with the darker deeds of Christianity". Saladin in the film refuses to help assassinate Richard I and in fact sends out help to prevent Richard from being killed by the treacherous other Europeans. Kozlovic also notes that when Saladin offers peace to the "foes of Islam", Richard responds by drawing his sword "and saying 'We are going to slaughter you!'", yet the film ends in a truce between Richard and Saladin. Kozlovic sees DeMille's film as a challenge to the stereotypical norm and negative picture painted of Muslims in Crusader films specifically.

While scouting Egyptian locations for The Ten Commandments (1956), Cecil B. DeMille was concerned that President Gamal Abdel Nasser's administration would refuse his production permission due to the script's negative depictions of Egyptian characters. To his surprise, Nasser enthusiastically accepted DeMille's request, because The Crusades had been immensely popular in Egypt, and appreciated the film's nuanced depiction of Saladin and the Muslim characters. Katherine Orrison writes in Written in Stone: Making Cecil B. DeMille's Epic The Ten Commandments, that Nasser's minister of war Abdel Hakim Amer stated "The Crusades was immensely popular here in Egypt. It ran for three years in the same theater in Cairo, and Col. Nasser and I saw it no less than twenty times. It was our favourite picture when we were attending military school. And Col. Nasser was called ‘Henry Wilcoxon’ by the other students because he would grow up to be a great military leader someday, just like Coeur-de-Lion."

== Music score ==
The film is noted for its spectacular film score, composed by Rudolph G. Kopp, along with the work of such other uncredited composers as Heinz Roemheld, Milan Roder, Frederick Hollander, John Leipold and Herman Hand. It includes the "Hymn of Joy," by Kopp, with lyrics by Harold Lamb; "Soldier's Song," by Kopp and Lamb; and the stirring "Song of the Crusades," by Kopp and Richard A. Whiting, with lyrics by Lamb and Leo Robin, and special choral lyrics by Jeanie Macpherson, heard at the beginning of the film and as the crusaders march to battle.

== Reception ==
=== Box office ===
With a budget of $1,376,260, the film earned a domestic total of $1,491,471, and $208,529 overseas for a worldwide total of $1,700,000.

=== Critical response ===
Andre Sennwald of The New York Times called the film a "grand show" and "two hours of tempestuous extravaganza". Sennwald also praised the "superbly managed" staging of the attack on the city of Acre and cited "excellent performances" all around, stating in conclusion, "It is rich in the kind of excitement that pulls an audience irresistibly to the edge of its seat." Variety also praised the film, writing, "Probably only DeMille could make a picture like Crusades – and get away with it. It's long, and the story is not up to some of his previous films, but the production has sweep and spectacle." Film Daily declared it "one of the best DeMille pictures ... The battle scenes are among the most thrilling made since the inception of talking pictures." John Mosher of The New Yorker was less enthused, finding it "rather mild De Mille" that "doesn't compare by a long shot with many other scenes in the Master's collection. There is nothing in the film as astonishing as his Passing through the Red Sea, nothing as amazingly ornamental as his arenas of Imperial Rome." Mosher did praise Wilcoxon's performance, however, especially in his scenes with Young. Similarly reserved, Graham Greene writing for The Spectator described it as "a very long film" with a "stuffy horsehair atmosphere of beards and whiskers", and criticized its historical accuracy as "a little quiet fun at the expense of Clio" with as "complete [a] lack of period sense" as "decorated mid-Victorian Bibles". Greene did praise de Mille's "childlike eye for details", however, and characterized the set-piece scenes (e.g. the cavalry charge and the storming of Acre) as "scenes of real executive genius".

The film's copyright was renewed in 1962.

== Home media ==
This film, along with The Sign of the Cross, Four Frightened People, Cleopatra and Union Pacific, was released on DVD in 2006 by Universal Studios as part of The Cecil B. DeMille Collection.
