= James Shaw, Baron Kilbrandon =

Scottish judge and law lord (1906–1989)

The Right Honourable The Lord Kilbrandon PC
- Lord Kilbrandon in 1965 by Walter Bird

Lord of Appeal in Ordinary
- In office 4 October 1971 – 1976

Senator of the College of Justice
- In office 1959 – 4 October 1971

Personal details
- Born: Charles James Dalrymple Shaw Martnaham, Ayrshire, Scotland
- Died: Balvicar, Argyll, Scotland
- Education: Balliol College, Oxford; University of Edinburgh

Charles James Dalrymple Shaw, Baron Kilbrandon, PC (15 August 1906 – 10 September 1989) was a Scottish judge and law lord.

== Family and education ==
He was the son of James Edward Shaw and his wife Gladys Elizabeth Lester (the daughter of the Rev. John Moore Lester and granddaughter of Lieutenant General Sir Frederick Parkinson Lester). Shaw was educated at Charterhouse School and went then to Balliol College, Oxford. He finally graduated at the University of Edinburgh. On 5 April 1937, he married Ruth Caroline Grant and had by her two sons and three daughters.

== Judicial career ==
Shaw was elected to the Faculty of Advocates in 1932 and was appointed its dean in 1957. After his military service in the Second World War, he was nominated a Queen's Counsel in 1949. He was Sheriff of Ayr and Bute from 1954 and subsequently Sheriff of Perth and Angus in 1957. Two years later, he became a Senator of the College of Justice and Lord of Session, choosing the judicial courtesy title Lord Kilbrandon. Shaw chaired the Scottish Law Commission in 1965. He was appointed a Lord of Appeal in Ordinary on 4 October 1971 and received the traditional life peerage as Baron Kilbrandon, of Kilbrandon, in the County of Argyll. In the same year he was sworn of the Privy Council.

Shaw was chancellor of the Diocese of Moray, Ross and Caithness as well as of the Diocese of Argyll and The Isles and acted as director of the Royal Scottish National Orchestra. He was chairman of the Scottish Transport Council and of the Standing Consultative Council on Youth Service in Scotland.

== Honours and legacy ==
During his career Shaw were awarded the honorary degrees of a Doctor of Laws by the University of Aberdeen and a Doctor of Science by his old alma mater, the University of Edinburgh. Gray's Inn made him an honorary bencher and Balliol College an honorary fellow.

His most important contribution to public life was probably his work as chairman of Royal Commission on the Constitution (commonly referred to as the Kilbrandon Commission) from 1972. He also chaired a committee on children in trouble. Nearly all its recommendations were enacted in new bills and created the basic structures of child care practices and policies in Scotland.

== See also ==
- Timeline of young people's rights in the United Kingdom
- Burmah Oil Co Ltd v Lord Advocate
