= Black Gold (1947 film) =

1947 film

- Film poster
- Directed by: Phil Karlson
- Written by: Agnes Christine Johnston, Caryl Coleman
- Produced by: Jeffrey Bernerd
- Starring: Anthony Quinn; Katherine DeMille; Raymond Hatton
- Cinematography: Harry Neumann
- Edited by: Roy V. Livingston
- Music by: Edward J. Kay
- Production company: Allied Artists
- Distributed by: Allied Artists
- Release date: September 16, 1947
- Running time: 90 minutes
- Country: United States
- Language: English

Black Gold is a 1947 American drama Western film directed by Phil Karlson and starring Anthony Quinn, Katherine DeMille and Raymond Hatton. It was the first Monogram Pictures film released under the Allied Artists banner and had the highest budget in Monogram's history at the time. It was also the first leading role for Anthony Quinn.

== Plot ==
Charley, an Indian, finds a Chinese boy (Davey), and adopts him. Charley has a mare, Black Hope, with whom he wishes to win the Kentucky Derby, so he trains Davey as a jockey.

== Cast ==
- Anthony Quinn as Charley Eagle
- Katherine DeMille as Sarah Eagle
- Ducky Louie as Davey
- Raymond Hatton as Buckey
- Kane Richmond as Stanley Lowell
- Thurston Hall as Colonel Caldwell
- Moroni Olsen as Dan Toland
- Jonathan Hale as Senator Watkins
- Elyse Knox as Ruth Frazer
- Charles Trowbridge as Judge Wilson
- Alan Bridge as Dr. Jonas
- James Flavin as Mac
- Norman Willis as Monty
- Clem McCarthy as Commentator
- Darryl Hickman as Schoolboy
- Franklyn Farnum as Kentucky Derby Race Official
- Eddie Acuff as Caldwell's Ranch Foreman
- Carmen D'Antonio as Mexican Woman

== Production ==
The film was loosely based on the true story of the horse Black Gold, who won the 1924 Kentucky Derby.

Karlson later said: "I made such a strong statement that the Indian nations all picked it up. They realized what we were saying in there. The average guy that would go see a motion picture in those days went to see entertainment. We weren't making statements, we were making cops 'n' robbers and good guys and bad guys. But to look at something and see the truth, for a change, was something that was unusual in those days."

Karlson also said that the film took a year to make because "I wanted the seasons. I went to Churchill Downs for the Derby and had to do the races here, and I had to get some desert scenes... a lot of time lapses in the picture." He directed four other films while making Black Gold.
