= Isle of Destiny =

- Film poster
- Directed by: Elmer Clifton
- Written by: Allan Vaughan Elston (story); Arthur Hoerl (screenplay); Robert Lively (screenplay) [M. Coates Webster (screenplay)
- Produced by: Franklyn Warner
- Starring: William Gargan; Wallace Ford; June Lang; Gilbert Roland
- Cinematography: Edward Linden
- Edited by: Robert O. Crandall
- Music by: C. Bakaleinikoff
- Production companies: Franklyn Warner Productions; Fine Arts Pictures
- Distributed by: RKO Radio Pictures
- Release date: March 8, 1940
- Running time: 95 minutes
- Country: United States
- Language: English

Isle of Destiny (aka Trouble Over the Pacific) is a 1940 American comedy adventure film set in the South Seas. The film was directed by Elmer Clifton and originally produced by Franklyn Warner for Grand National Pictures in 1939. Isle of Destiny was the only feature film filmed in the Cosmocolor process with prints by Cinecolor. Isle of Destiny stars William Gargan, Wallace Ford, June Lang and Gilbert Roland.

== Plot ==
The glamorous heiress and daredevil pilot Virginia Allerton (June Lang) is test-flying her seaplane "The Lady Bird" after some modifications made by her mechanic Max Raft (Ted Osborne), also on the aircraft. They experience problems mid-air when they are caught in a tropical storm, and all the ships in the South Sea area are alerted to their distress.

Virginia's brother, Lt. George Allerton (Grant Richards), is stationed with the U.S. Marine Corps on the nearby island of Palo Pango when he hears his sister's distress calls. Virginia and Max head to the island to take refuge from the storm.

Upon their arrival, Virginia and Max are welcomed by two U.S. Marines: "Stripes" Thornton (William Gargan) and "Milly" Barnes (Wallace Ford). Also present is Oliver Barton (Gilbert Roland), who runs the trading post but is also in the business of smuggling guns. He invites Virginia to stay at his house for the night, and also challenges her to a flying race to Guam, betting $5,000 that he will win. Both Marines are soon smitten by Virginia, and she becomes attracted to Stripes.

Virginia is unaware that Barton is planning to use her as cover for his shipment of guns about to take place on the steamer Albotros, commanded by Captain N. Lawson (Harry Woods). To help him, Barton has an assistant, "Doc" Spriggs (Etienne Girardot), an old eccentric gentleman who believes in reincarnation.

The race begins and Barton tries to outrun Virginia by taking a perilous shortcut over an island. Barton plays a trick on Virginia by faking his aircraft crashing into the jungle. Virginia lands on the water to rescue him but damages her aircraft in the process. It turns out Barton lives nearby and Virginia and Max are invited to be the guests of him and his Caribbean wife Inda (Katherine DeMille).

Inda believes that Barton is smitten and becomes jealous of Virginia. Max finds evidence in Barton's aircraft of his gun smuggling operation, and a fight between the men ensues. Inda kills Max with a poisoned dart she fires from a blowgun. Barton flees the island and goes back to Palo Pango. He lies to Stripes, telling him he has no idea where Virginia is, but Stripes finds a poisoned dart stuck into the hull of the aircraft and becomes suspicious. He deploys Milly and they follow Barton.

Stripes hides aboard Barton's aircraft and manages to tell the others where they land. He finds Virginia in Barton's jungle home, but Inda alerts Barton and Stripes and Virginia are quickly surrounded. Still, Stripes manages to hold Barton captive. The group escape boarding Barton's aircraft but it will not start. Barton runs off in the midst of a shoot-out, Milly arrives, armed with his hand grenades, and joins in to help Stripes.

Barton captures Virginia and brings her with him in his escape, but Inda spots the two of them, and furious with jealousy, gives the order to have him shot. A ship of Marines arrive on the scene and save the day, helping them back to Palo Pango.

Virginia and Stripes marry and fly off to Honolulu together on a honeymoon, leaving Milly, now promoted to sergeant, behind.

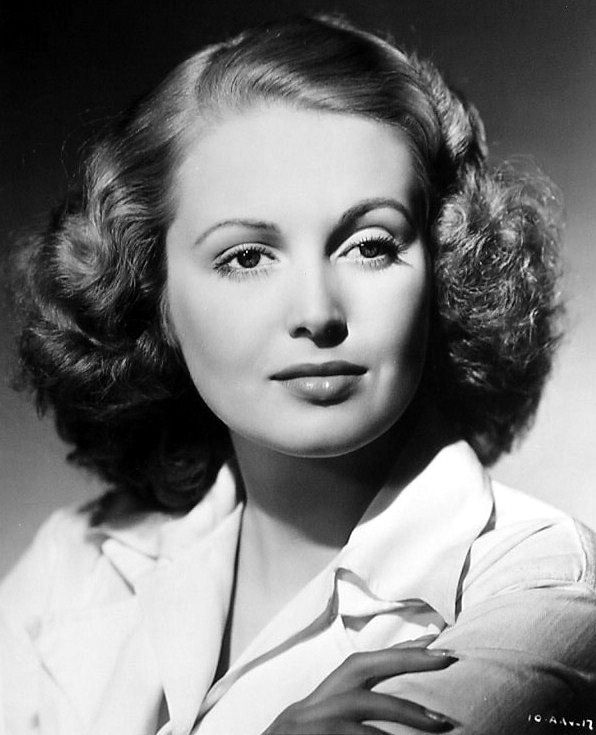
June Lang in Isle of Destiny (in a publicity still for the film)

== Cast ==
- William Gargan as Pvt. "Stripes" Thornton
- Wallace Ford as Pvt. "Milly" Barnes
- June Lang as Virginia Allerton
- Gilbert Roland as Oliver Barton
- Etienne Girardot as Cincinnatus "Doc" Spriggs
- Katherine DeMille as Inda Barton
- Grant Richards as Lt. George Allerton
- Tom Dugan as Sgt. Reikker
- Harry Woods as Capt. Lawson
- Ted Osborne as Max Raff
- The Sportsmen Quartet as Singing Marines
- Bill Days as Bill - member, Sportsmen Quartet
- Thurl Ravenscroft as Thurl, member, Sportsmen Quartet
- John Rarig as John, member, Sportsmen Quartet
- Max Smith as Max - member, Sportsmen Quartet
- Ray Walker - Cpl. Jones aka Jonesy, Radio Man

== Soundtrack ==
The Sportsman Quartet perform "Moonlight Magic" (composed by Irving Bibo and Eddie Cherkose) in the Isle of Destiny. Music was under the direction of Constantin Bakaleinikoff as Music Director and David Chudnow, Music Supervisor.

== Production ==
The working title for the film was Trouble over the Pacific with principal photography beginning in 1939 on Santa Catalina Island, California. Produced by Franklyn Warner originally for Grand National Pictures, however, by the time of the film's production, in late 1939, Grand National had gone bankrupt, subsequently, RKO bought the distribution rights to the film.

Karen Morley was originally cast in the role of Virginia, but due to illness, was forced to leave the film and was replaced by June Lang. There was a two-week shooting period on location in Catalina, California from May 24 to late-September 1939. At the time of its production, Isle of Destiny had the biggest budget of any Fine Arts picture to date and marked the introduction of Cosmocolor to feature films. (Note: The 1938 short, A Western Welcome was also shot in Cosmocolor.)

Aviation film historian Christian Santoir compared the scenario depicted in Isle of Destiny to that of the real-life tragedy of Amelia Earhart being lost in the South Pacific. He also described the aviation elements as relying on a Sikorsky S-39-CS Special c/n 914, NC-52V and a Stearman C3R aircraft for the "air race".

== Reception ==
B.R. Crisler in his review of Isle of Destiny for The New York Times, noted, "The authors of the Rialto's current excursion in melodrama, "Isle of Destiny," certainly deserve to be commended for their resourcefulness, if for nothing else, because they have succeeded in cramming into one feature-length picture practically all of the tricks known to the adventure story. In fact, the writers seem to have been so impressed by the plethora of material that they didn't pay much attention to continuity. As a result the film becomes somewhat entangled at times in its own plot manipulations."

Film historians Richard Jewell and Vernon Harbin in The RKO Story (1982) considered Isle of Destiny, "laughable exoticism" with "... wretched screenplay ... frenzied direction and inept performances by the lead actors..."
