= Banjo on My Knee (film) =

1936 film

- Film poster
- Directed by: John Cromwell
- Written by: Harry Hamilton (novel)
- Screenplay by: Nunnally Johnson
- Based on: Banjo on My Knee (1936 novel)
- Produced by: Darryl F. Zanuck; Nunnally Johnson
- Starring: Barbara Stanwyck; Joel McCrea; Walter Brennan
- Cinematography: Ernest Palmer
- Edited by: Hanson T. Fritch
- Music by: Score: Charles Maxwel; Songs: Jimmy McHugh (music); Harold Adamson (lyrics)
- Distributed by: Twentieth Century Fox Film Corporation
- Release date: December 11, 1936
- Running time: 95 minutes
- Country: United States
- Language: English

Banjo on My Knee is a 1936 American musical comedy-drama film directed by John Cromwell, starring Barbara Stanwyck and Joel McCrea, with Walter Brennan, Buddy Ebsen, Katherine De Mille, and singer Tony Martin in supporting roles. The film was nominated for an Academy Award in the Best Sound Recording category for the work of Edmund H. Hansen.

== Plot ==
Island No.21 is little more than a sandbar in the Mississippi River, but to the shanty boat people moored there istis the world. Of what happens on shore they know little and care less. Shanty boat people firmly believe that if God had intended folks to live in towns, He would have created towns at the same time He created rocks and trees...and rivers.

— Opening captions

In a shantyboat community in Pecan Point, Tennessee, Ernie Hollie marries Pearl Elliot.

Businessman Mr. Slade invites himself to the wedding’s afterparty and demands to kiss the bride. Pearl hesitantly allows the kiss for the sake of maintaining Mr. Slade’s business contact with the community. After the kiss, Ernie punches Mr. Slade, knocking him into the river. Mr. Slade is presumed dead after search parties fail to locate him. When Mr. Slade returns alive with a police patrol, Newt, Ernie’s father, urges Ernie to flee the community. Ernie does so and begins sailing the world.

During Ernie’s time away, Pearl meets Warfield Scott, a portraitist based in New Orleans who makes romantic advances on her and offers her a job at his studio. Pearl entertains his offer because of her loneliness but untimely rejects it.

Ernie returns having decided to move his family to Aruba. He and Pearl argue about their future and Pearl leaves with Warfield for New Orleans. Ernie chases after Pearl and is in turn pursued by Newt.

In New Orleans, Pearl decides to part ways with Warfield and gets a job in a café to pay back her travel expenses. Ernie confronts Warfield in his studio, demanding to see Pearl, but Warfield does not tell him where she is. He punches Warfield and leaves.

During a night of despondent drinking at the café, Ernie meets friends from a past voyage and departs with them for Cuba, narrowly missing Pearl on his way out.

Later, Pearl and Newt reunite and become performers at the café, along with the café’s singer Chick Bean, whom Pearl has admired. Chick confesses his love for Pearl and asks her to leave New Orleans with him. Before she can accept, Ernie’s cousin Buddy appears carrying a letter from Ernie, who will be in New Orleans the next day.

While waiting for Ernie, Pearl is approached by Warfield. Ernie sees Pearl and Warfield together and attacks Warfield in a fit of rage. The police arrest Ernie and Pearl leaves New Orleans with Chick.

Ernie’s fine is paid by Leota, a Pecan Point woman romantically interested in him and jealous of Pearl. Leota and the Holley men return home, where Ernie is made to wed Leota. During the wedding, Pearl comes back for her possessions and fights Leota, who cuts the Holley houseboat loose in a storm. After landing safely, Newt serenades Ernie and Pearl as they reconcile.

== Cast ==
- Barbara Stanwyck as Pearl Elliott Holley
- Joel McCrea as Ernie Holley
- Walter Brennan as Newt Holley
- Buddy Ebsen as Buddy
- Helen Westley as Grandma
- Walter Catlett as Warfield Scott
- Anthony Martin as Chick Bean
- Katherine De Mille as Leota Long
- Victor Kilian as Mr. Slade
- Minna Gombell as Ruby
- Spencer Charters as Judge Tope
- George Humbert as Jules
- Hilda Vaughn as Gurtha
- Theresa Harris singer on dock (uncredited)

== Reception ==
In a contemporary review for The New York Times, critic Frank S. Nugent wrote: "If we are to believe the Roxy's "Banjo on My Knee"—and there isn't an earthly reason why we should—the picturesque shanty boaters of the Mississippi are nothing more than song-and-dance men in the rough, homegrown crooners, players of one-man bands or torch singers of limited range and a tendency to grow moist-eyed whenever they hear that old American folk-song "The St. Louis Blues." It is an unsettling premise, disillusioning and unthinkable, and it impels us to scowl fiercely at the ballyhoo artists who have been telling us that the new Twentieth Century-Fox picture "combines the setting of Tobacco Road with the mood of Steamboat 'Round the Bend. It ain't no such thing."

In their March, 1937 edition, Modern Screen gave the film a two-star review and concluded that it was "on the whole, an enjoyable picture." The review offered positive comments for the performers, and said that the film provided Joel McCrea and Barbara Stanwyck "ample opportunity to display their special talents …. Walter Brennan steals the picture with a comedy character role which equals his Swan in Come and Get It. Joel McCrea is completely believable as the river lad, and Barbara Stanwyck's work will add to her recently increasing popularity. Buddy Ebsen works in some nice comedy and a few fancy tap numbers, and there is some excellent singing by Tony Martin."
