= Too Many Women (1942 film) =

1942 film by Bernard B. Ray

- Directed by: Bernard B. Ray
- Written by: Eddie Davis (story and screenplay)
- Produced by: Bernard B. Ray
- Starring: See below
- Cinematography: Jack Greenhalgh
- Edited by: Carl Himm
- Music by: Clarence Wheeler (uncredited)
- Production company: Producers Releasing Corporation
- Release date: 1942
- Running time: 67 minutes
- Country: United States
- Language: English

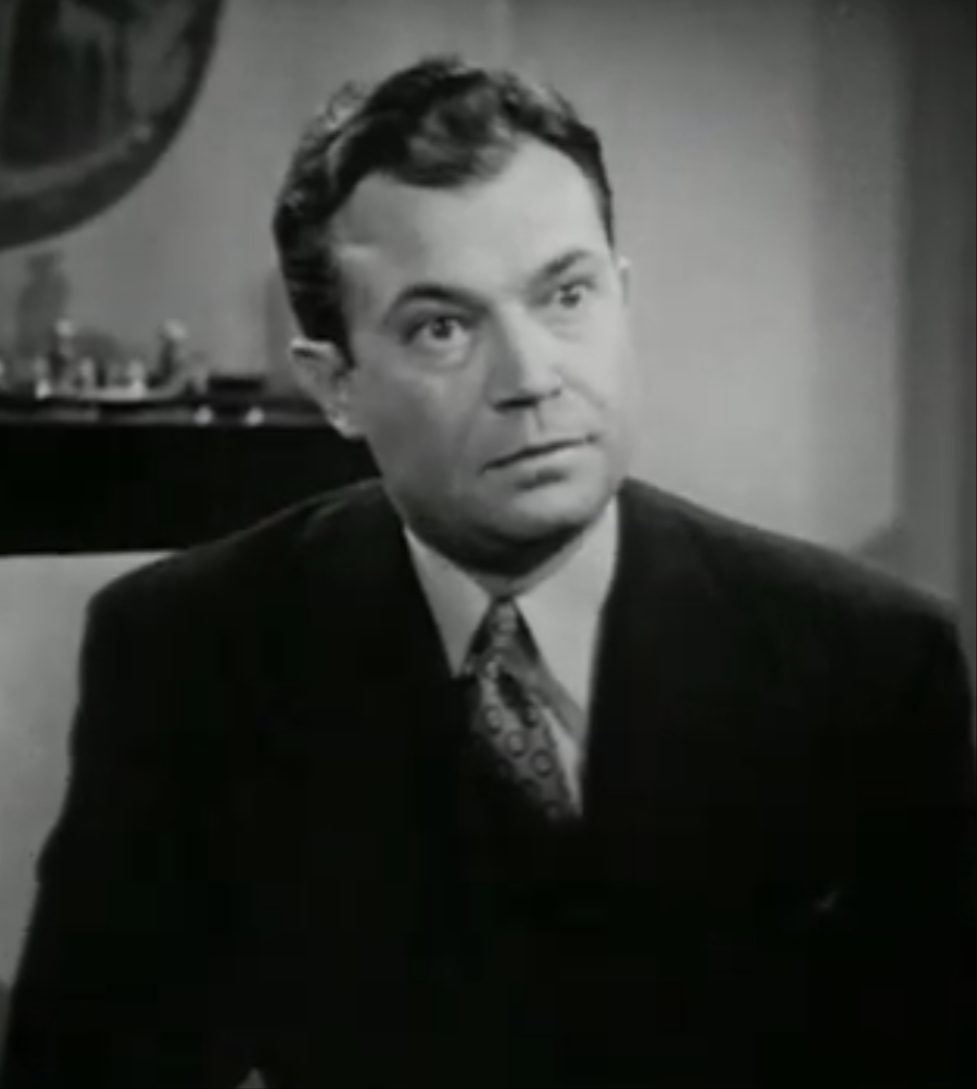
Fred Sherman in the American public domain film Too Many Women (1942) - cropped screenshot.

Too Many Women, also known as Girl Trouble and Man Trap, is a 1942 American film directed by Bernard B. Ray.

== Plot summary ==
Unsure of their financial situation, Richard Sutton and Linda Pearson have postponed their plans to marry to when they have a steady income. To be able to turn down a job offer he doesn't like, he pretends to have inherited money from a relative. Problem arises as his grandmother hears of the inheritance and believes it is a particular wealthy uncle Woodrow in Brazil who has thrown in the towel, leaving his $3 Million to Richard. She is also unaware of Richard's engagement to Linda.

When Richard wants to take the grandmother out of her misconception, her doctor advises against it, saying the shock could cause her death. Believing her grandson is rich now, she starts campaigning for his engagement to young beautiful Gwenny Miller. Gwenny is the grandmother's ward.

Another wealthy young woman, Barbara Cartwright, tells Richard she has an idea of how he can solve his problems. Richard goes to visit Barbara, but is quite dozy after involuntarily taking sleeping pills. He falls asleep, and when he wakes up again, he is seemingly engaged to Barbara.

Outraged and jealous, Linda breaks off their engagement, and Richard goes on a bender to drown his sorrows. Again he is knocked out, and wakes up in the apartment of infamous playboy Chester Wannamaker. With him in the apartment is a chorus girl named Lorraine O'Reilly, who really is Chester's fiancé.

Both Barbara and Gwenny soon arrives to the apartment to confront him, and after that also Lorraine's brother. The brother believes Richard is Chester and uses a gun to threaten him into marrying his sister.

Later, Richard's grandmother and uncle arrive at the apartment, saving him from the wrath of the women and the brother, explaining to them that Richard is poor. Richard reconciles with Linda after explaining the whole misunderstanding.

== Cast ==
- Neil Hamilton as Richard Sutton
- June Lang as Gwenny Miller
- Joyce Compton as Barbara Cartwright
- Barbara Read as Linda Pearson
- Fred Sherman as Charlie Blakewell
- Marlo Dwyer as Lorraine O'Reilly
- Kate MacKenna as Grandmother Sutton
- Maurice Cass as Doctor Hamilton
- Matt McHugh as Spike O'Reilly
- Harry Holman as John Cartwright
- George Davis as Bottles
- Pat Gleason as Gibbons
- Tom Herbert as W. R. Mitchell
- Bertram Marburgh as Uncle Woodrow
- Dora Clement as Mrs. Fairbanks
