= Belle of the Nineties =

1934 American Western film by Leo McCarey

- Theatrical poster
- Directed by: Leo McCarey
- Written by: Mae West
- Produced by: William LeBaron
- Starring: Mae West; Roger Pryor; John Mack Brown; Katherine DeMille; Duke Ellington
- Cinematography: Karl Struss
- Edited by: LeRoy Stone
- Music by: Arthur Johnston
- Production company: Paramount Pictures
- Distributed by: Paramount Pictures
- Release date: September 21, 1934
- Running time: 75 minutes
- Country: United States
- Language: English
- Budget: $800,000 (estimated)

Belle of the Nineties is a 1934 American Western film directed by Leo McCarey and released by Paramount Pictures. Mae West's fourth motion picture, it was based on her original story It Ain't No Sin, which was also to be the film's title until censors objected. Johnny Mack Brown, Duke Ellington, and Katherine DeMille are also in the cast. The film is noted for being the premiere performance of the jazz standard "My Old Flame", performed by West with the Duke Ellington Orchestra.

== Plot ==
Ruby Carter is the beautiful Vaudeville star and headliner at a nightclub in St. Louis in the early 1890s. She is romantically involved with the Tiger Kid, a prizefighter. To get the preoccupied Tiger Kid to focus on his training, his trainer arranges for another boxer to give the impression that she has been unfaithful to him. Heartbroken, the Tiger Kid sends her a breakup letter. Ruby's manager convinces her to take a high-paying contract for a residency at the Sensation House in New Orleans, where the owner, Ace Lamont, installs Ruby in the suite adjacent to his own. She quickly makes a name for herself, drawing numerous fans and suitors, receiving a diamond necklace from one of them. Lamont is also attracted to her but resents her wealthy suitors, as they prevent him from controlling her. Lamont is romantically linked with Molly Brant, whom he continually disregards.

Unbeknownst to Ruby, the Tiger Kid comes to New Orleans and is selected as a contender in a title fight hosted by Lamont. Lamont tells the Tiger Kid that the cost of the title fight has put him under financial pressure; Lamont lies that he had given a diamond necklace to a woman who was blackmailing him. Lamont pressures the Tiger Kid into acting as a robber to "steal back" the jewels; he plans a carriage ride together with Ruby along a dark stretch of waterfront. The set-up works and a masked Tiger Kid takes Ruby's jewelry and flees, but doesn't recognize her face in the darkness. Ruby pointedly comments that the robber didn't take Lamont's ring. Her suspicions are confirmed later, when she sees Lamont and the Tiger Kid meet in the lobby and slip upstairs. From the adjoining room, she sees the Tiger Kid hand Lamont her jewelry, which Lamont locks in his personal safe.

Ruby continues to perform at the Sensation House in the days leading up to the fight. She sets a trap by giving Lamont other jewelry for safekeeping, then uses opera glasses to note the safe's combination from a distance. She suspects a fix is in, and tells her suitors to bet heavily against the Tiger Kid. In the ring, the Tiger Kid puts up a strong fight, but is finally knocked out after thirty rounds, shortly after Lamont had given him a bottle of water.

After the match, Ruby and the Tiger Kid reconcile, when he realizes she had been faithful to him in St. Louis; in turn, she tells him Lamont had likely drugged him. That evening, Lamont tells Ruby that covering all of the bets will nearly ruin him, and plans instead to set fire to the Sensation House and abscond with the contents of his safe and flee with her to Havana. She, however, has already cleaned out his safe and instructed her maid to pack her bags and get a cab waiting. Lamont locks Molly in a closet and pours lamp oil around the room, but before he can set the fire, the Tiger Kid confronts Lamont, killing him with a single punch. Ruby then inadvertently lights the room on fire with a discarded cigarette. She and the Tiger Kid rescue Molly and call the fire department. A series of newspaper headlines appears on screen, showing the Tiger Kid is charged with, and cleared, of killing Lamont. The final scene shows Ruby and the Tiger Kid getting married in front of a justice of the peace.

== Cast ==
- Mae West as Ruby Carter
- Roger Pryor as Tiger Kid
- Johnny Mack Brown as Brooks Claybourne (as John Mack Brown)
- Katherine DeMille as Molly Brant
- John Miljan as Ace Lamont (owner, Sensation House)
- Duke Ellington as Piano player (Sensation House)
- James Donlan as Kirby
- Stuart Holmes as Dirk
- Harry Woods as Slade
- Edward Gargan as Stogie
- Libby Taylor as Jasmine
- Warren Hymer as St. Louis Fighter
- Benny Baker as Blackie
- Morrie Cohan as Butch
- Tyler Brooke as Comedian
- Tom Herbert as Gilbert
- Eddie Borden as Comedian
- Fuzzy Knight as Comedian
- Gene Austin as St. Louis Crooner
- Blue Washington as Doorman (uncredited)

== Production ==
Shooting commenced on March 19, 1934, and concluded in June. The film was released on September 21, 1934. As usual with West's films, some scenes were removed for versions to be shown in different states. To be shown in New York, one of the biggest markets, they had to completely re-shoot the final scene. Mae West's character and the Tiger Kid were originally to complete their nuptials without a marriage ceremony; the ceremony had to be included.

The male lead was supposed to be played by George Raft, but he refused. His part was taken by Roger Pryor, a stage actor. Filmink said "this was Raft's first truly dumb movie choice – there were to be plenty more."

== Music ==
A publicity stunt went awry when 50 parrots were trained to shout the original title of "It Ain't No Sin". The parrots were subsequently released in the jungles of South America, still repeating "it ain't no sin" over and over again. Sheet music of the song "My American Beauty" was also printed with the film's original title, and corrected with a rubber stamp. The film is noted in the jazz world for being the release of the song "My Old Flame", composed by Arthur Johnston with lyrics by Sam Coslow. It is sung by Mae West in the film, backed by the Duke Ellington Orchestra and went on to become a jazz standard. Johnston and Coslow also wrote the songs "My American Beauty", "When a St. Louis Woman Comes Down to New Orleans", and "Troubled Waters" for the film, which also features "The Memphis Blues" and "At Sundown".

== Reception ==
Although Belle of the Nineties turned a profit, it was much less successful than West's 1933 films She Done Him Wrong and I'm No Angel. However, it received some positive reviews from critics, with Andre Sennwald of The New York Times describing the Johnston and Coslow songs as "quite perfect", and stating that the film was "bolstered by a smart and funny script, an excellent physical production and a generally buoyant comic spirit". He added that "There are gags for every taste and most of them are outrageously funny according to almost any standard of humor".
