= George Le Grand Jacob =

Army officer in the East India Company

Sir George Le Grand Jacob KCSI, CB
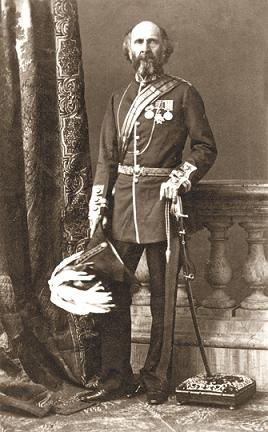
- Born: 24 April 1805; Roath Court, Wales
- Died: 27 January 1881 (aged 75); London, England
- Burial place: Brookwood Cemetery, Surrey
- Military career
- Allegiance: United Kingdom; East India Company
- Service: Bombay Army
- Service years: 1820–1861
- Rank: Major-general
- Wars: Anglo-Persian War; Indian Mutiny
- Other work: Special Political Commissioner, Southern Mahratta Country

Major-General Sir George Le Grand Jacob KCSI, CB (1805 – 1881) was a British army officer in the service of the East India Company, and an Oriental polyglot.

== Early life ==
George Le Grand Jacob, the fifth son and youngest child of John Jacob, (Note: see Edward Jacob, 1710?–1788, ad fin.) by his wife Anna Maria Le Grand, was born at his father's residence, Roath Court, near Cardiff, 24 April 1805. His family in 1815 removed to Guernsey. Jacob was educated at Elizabeth College, Guernsey, and under private tutors in France and England, and when about fifteen was sent to London to learn Oriental languages under Dr. John Borthwick Gilchrist.

== Career ==
He obtained an Indian infantry cadetship in 1820, and on the voyage out to Bombay contracted a close friendship with Alexander Burnes. He was posted to the 2nd or grenadier regiment Bombay Native Infantry (later Prince of Wales's Own) as ensign 9 June 1821, in which corps he obtained all his regimental steps except the last. His subsequent commissions were: lieutenant 10 December 1823, captain 6 June 1836, major 1 May 1848, lieutenant-colonel in the (late) 31st Bombay native infantry 15 November 1853, brevet-colonel 6 December 1856, brigadier-general 21 July 1858, major-general on retirement 31 December 1861.

Jacob passed for interpreter in Hindustâni so speedily after arrival in India, that he was complimented in presidency general orders. He afterwards passed in Persian and Marâthi. He saw some harassing service with his regiment against the Bheels in the pestiferous Nerbudda jungles, and was subsequently with it in Cutch and at Ukulkote. He took his furlough home in 1831, and in January 1833 was appointed orderly officer in the East India Military Seminary, Addiscombe. While there, at the request of the Oriental Translation Fund, he undertook the translation of the Ajaib-al-Tabakat ("Wonder of the Universe"), a manuscript purchased by Alexander Burnes in the bazaar at Bokhara. Jacob considered the work not worth printing, and his manuscript translation is now in the library of the Asiatic Society, London. On 18 June 1835 he married Emily, daughter of Colonel Utterton of Heath Lodge, Croydon, and soon afterwards sailed for India. His wife died at sea, and Jacob landed at Bombay in very broken health. He recovered under the care of a brother, William Jacob, then an officer in the Bombay artillery, and in 1836 was appointed second political assistant in Kattywar, where he was in political charge in 1839–43. His ability in dealing with the disputed Limree succession was noticed by the government; the curious details are given in his book Western India. He was also thanked for his report on the Babriawar tribes (1843) and other reports on Kattywar. Early in 1845 he served as extra aide-de-camp to Major-general Delamotte during the disturbances in the South Mahratta country, and was wounded in the head and arm by a falling rock when in command of the storming party in the assault on the hill-fort of Munsuntosh. In April 1845 Jacob was appointed political agent in Sawunt Warree. The little state was bankrupt, with its gaols overflowing; but Jacob's judicious measures during a period of six years restored order, retrieved the finances, and reformed abuses. On 8 Jan. 1851 Jacob was made political agent in Cutch, and was sent into Sind as a special commissioner to inquire into the case of the unfortunate Mir Ali Murad Talpur, Khan of Khypore, the papers relating to which were printed among Sessional Papers of 1858 and the following years. He also sat on an inquiry into departmental abuses at Bombay. An account of his travels in Cutch appeared in the Proceedings for 1862 of the Bombay Geographical Society, since merged in the Asiatic Society of Bombay. His health needing change, he obtained leave, and visited China, Java, Sarawak, and Australia, "keeping his eyes and ears ever on the alert, always reading, writing, or inquiring—mostly smoking—winning men by his geniality and women by his courteous bearing". On his return he was shipwrecked on a coral reef in Torres Straits, and saved from cannibal natives by a Dutch vessel. He quit Cutch for Bombay in December 1856, at first purposing to retire; but he served under Outram in the Persian expedition. In Persia he was in command of the native light battalion in the division under Henry Havelock, whom Jacob appears to have regarded as too much of a martinet. He returned with the expeditionary force to Bombay in May 1857.

=== Indian Mutiny ===
Acting under the orders of Lord Elphinstone, the Governor of Bombay, Jacob arrived at Kolapore on 14 August, a fortnight after the 27th Bombay native infantry had broken into mutiny there. Four days later he, with a mere handful of troops, quietly disarmed the regiment, and brought the ringleaders of the outbreak to justice. On 4 December following, when the city closed its gates against Jacob's small force which was encamped in their lines outside, Jacob promptly blew open one of the gates, put the rebels to flight, tried by drumhead court-martial and executed on the spot thirty-six who were caught red-handed, and held the city until the mischief was past. His vigour, no doubt, prevented the wave of rebellion from sweeping over the whole southern Mahratta country and overflowing into the Nizam's dominions. Jacob was specially thanked in presidency general orders 8 January 1858 for "the promptitude and decision shown by you on the occasion of the recent insurrection at Kolapore", and "for the manner in which you upheld the honour of this army, proving to all around you what a British officer can effect by gallantry and prudence in the face of the greatest difficulties". Jacob's powers, at first limited to Kolapore, Sawunt Warree, and Rutnagerry, were in May 1858 extended to the whole South Mahratta country, of which he was appointed special commissioner, the command of the troops with the rank of brigadier-general being subsequently added. After dealing successfully with various local outbreaks, Jacob was sent to Goa to confer with the Portuguese authorities respecting the Sawunt rebels on the frontier. This service successfully accomplished, he resigned his command. He remained nominally political agent in Cutch up to the date of his leaving India in 1859.

James Outram appears to have desired that Jacob should succeed him as member of the council at Calcutta, but he retired with the rank of major-general from 31 December 1861. He was made CB in 1859, and KCSI in 1869.

== Appraisal ==
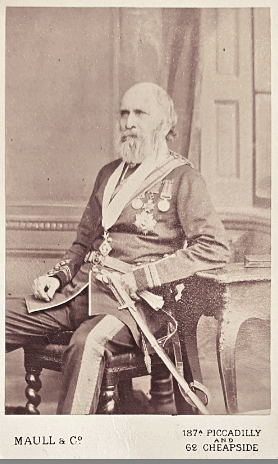
Sir George Le Grand Jacob in old age

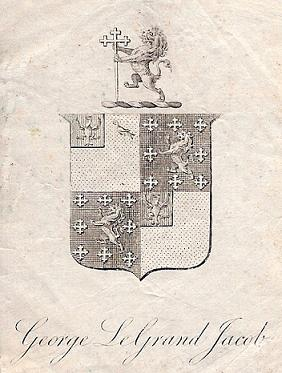
Jacob's bookplate

Jacob has been likened in character to his cousin, General John Jacob. He had the same fearlessness, the same hatred of red tape and jobbery, and the same genius for understanding and conciliating Asiatics. His outspoken advocacy of native rights not unfrequently gave offence to the officials with whom he came in contact. Throughout his life he was a zealous student of the literature of India, and whenever opportunity offered did his best to promote research in the history and antiquities of the land. He was one of the earliest copiers of the Asoka inscriptions (250 BC) at Girnar, Kattywar; and in Cunningham's Corpus Inscriptionum, Calcutta, 1877, are many inscriptions transcribed by him in Western India. A list of papers bearing on the history, archaeology, topography, geology, and metallurgy of Western India, contributed by Jacob at different times to various publications, is given in the Journal of the Asiatic Society, London, new series, xiii. pp. vii. and viii. Some are included in the Royal Society's Catalogue of Scientific Papers; but neither list appears complete. In his prime he was an ardent sportsman. Seven lions fell to his rifle in one day in Kattywar, and his prowess as a shikarry was perpetuated in native verse. The last twenty years of Jacob's life were spent at home under much suffering: a constant struggle with asthma, bronchitis, and growing blindness. His mental vigour remained unimpaired. With the assistance of his niece and adopted daughter, Miss Gertrude Le Grand Jacob, he wrote his Western India before and during the Mutiny, which was published in 1871, and was highly commended by the historian Kaye; and shortly before his death he paid 20l. for a translation from the Dutch of some papers of interest on the island of Bali (east of Java), subsequently printed in the Journal of the Asiatic Society, London, viii. 115, ix. 59, x. 49. Jacob died in London on 27 January 1881, and was buried in Brookwood Cemetery, near Woking, Surrey.

== Sources ==
- Chichester, Henry Manners (1892). "Jacob, George Le Grand" . In Lee, Sidney (ed.). Dictionary of National Biography. Vol. 29. London: Smith, Elder & Co. pp. 114–116.
