= Reggie Lanning =

American cinematographer

- Born: Reginald Thomas Lanning; October 6, 1893; Congress, Arizona, U.S.
- Died: December 6, 1965 (aged 72); Woodland Hills, California, U.S.
- Occupation: Cinematographer
- Years active: 1918–1965
- Spouse: Eileen Lanning
- Children: 1

Reginald Thomas Lanning (October 6, 1893 – December 6, 1965) was an American cinematographer. He was known for his cinematography work on over 100 films.

Lanning died of emphysema on December 6, 1965 in Woodland Hills, California, at the age of 72. He was buried in Oakwood Memorial Park Cemetery.

== Selected filmography ==
- The Cameraman (1928)
- Spite Marriage (1929)
- China Bound (1929)
- Laughing Irish Eyes (1936)
- The Harvester (1936)
- Heroes of the Hills (1938)
- Pals of the Saddle (1938)
- Santa Fe Stampede (1938)
- Home on the Prairie (1939)
- Wyoming Outlaw (1939)
- New Frontier (1939)
- Sabotage (1939)
- Zorro's Fighting Legion (1939)
- Days of Jesse James (1939)
- Wolf of New York (1940)
- Grandpa Goes to Town (1940)
- Gaucho Serenade (1940)
- One Man's Law (1940)
- The Ranger and the Lady (1940)
- Oklahoma Renegades (1940)
- Frontier Vengeance (1940)
- Who Killed Aunt Maggie? (1940)
- The Phantom Cowboy (1941)
- The Great Train Robbery (1941)
- Mr. District Attorney (1941)
- Pals of the Pecos (1941)
- Jungle Girl (1941)
- Sunset in Wyoming (1941)
- The Pittsburgh Kid (1941)
- King of the Texas Rangers (1941)
- Mercy Island (1941)
- Gauchos of El Dorado (1941)
- Dick Tracy vs. Crime, Inc. (1941)
- Man from Cheyenne (1942)
- Code of the Outlaw (1942)
- Sunset on the Desert (1942)
- Spy Smasher (1942)
- Westward Ho! (1942)
- Perils of Nyoka (1942)
- Call of the Canyon (1942)
- Thundering Trails (1943)
- Idaho (1943)
- King of the Cowboys (1943)
- Song of Texas (1943)
- The Masked Marvel (1943)
- Silver Spurs (1943)
- Wagon Tracks West (1943)
- Hoosier Holiday (1943)
- A Scream in the Dark (1943)
- Pistol Packin' Mama (1943)
- Hands Across the Border (1944)
- Casanova in Burlesque (1944)
- Hidden Valley Outlaws (1944)
- Rosie the Riveter (1944)
- Cowboy and the Senorita (1944)
- Tucson Raiders (1944)
- Marshal of Reno (1944)
- Silver City Kid (1944)
- Three Little Sisters (1944)
- Sing, Neighbor, Sing (1944)
- Strangers in the Night (1944)
- My Buddy (1944)
- Lights of Old Santa Fe (1944)
- Faces in the Fog (1944)
- Steppin' in Society (1945)
- The Cheaters (1945)
- The Cherokee Flash (1945)
- Crime of the Century (1946)
- Song of Arizona (1946)
- Sheriff of Redwood Valley (1946)
- The Catman of Paris (1946)
- Rainbow Over Texas (1946)
- Valley of the Zombies (1946)
- Rendezvous with Annie (1946)
- The Inner Circle (1946)
- Plainsman and the Lady (1946)
- Sioux City Sue (1946)
- The Pilgrim Lady (1947)
- Calendar Girl (1947)
- Northwest Outpost (1947)
- Blackmail (1947)
- The Fabulous Texan (1947)
- The Flame (1947)
- The Inside Story (1948)
- California Firebrand (1948)
- I, Jane Doe (1948)
- The Timber Trail (1948)
- Angel in Exile (1948)
- Angel on the Amazon (1948)
- Grand Canyon Trail (1948)
- Wake of the Red Witch (1948)
- Train to Alcatraz (1948)
- Susanna Pass (1949)
- Down Dakota Way (1949)
- Sands of Iwo Jima (1949)
- Singing Guns (1950)
- The Savage Horde (1950)
- The Showdown (1950)
- Surrender (1950)
- Hit Parade of 1951 (1950)
- Belle Le Grand (1951)
- Cuban Fireball (1951)
- Heart of the Rockies (1951)
- Fighting Coast Guard (1951)
- The Wild Blue Yonder (1951)
- Hoodlum Empire (1952)
- I Dream of Jeanie (1952)
- Toughest Man in Arizona (1952)
- Thunderbirds (1952)
- Woman They Almost Lynched (1953)
- The Lady Wants Mink (1953)
- Sweethearts on Parade (1953)
- Sea of Lost Ships (1953)
- Flight Nurse (1953)
- Untamed Heiress (1954)
- The Outcast (1954)
- Carolina Cannonball (1955)
- Abbott and Costello Meet the Keystone Kops (1955)
- I Cover the Underworld (1955)
- City of Shadows (1955)
- The Road to Denver (1955)
- The World of Abbott and Costello (1965) - (uncredited)
