= Vera Ralston =

Czech figure skater and actress (1919–2003)

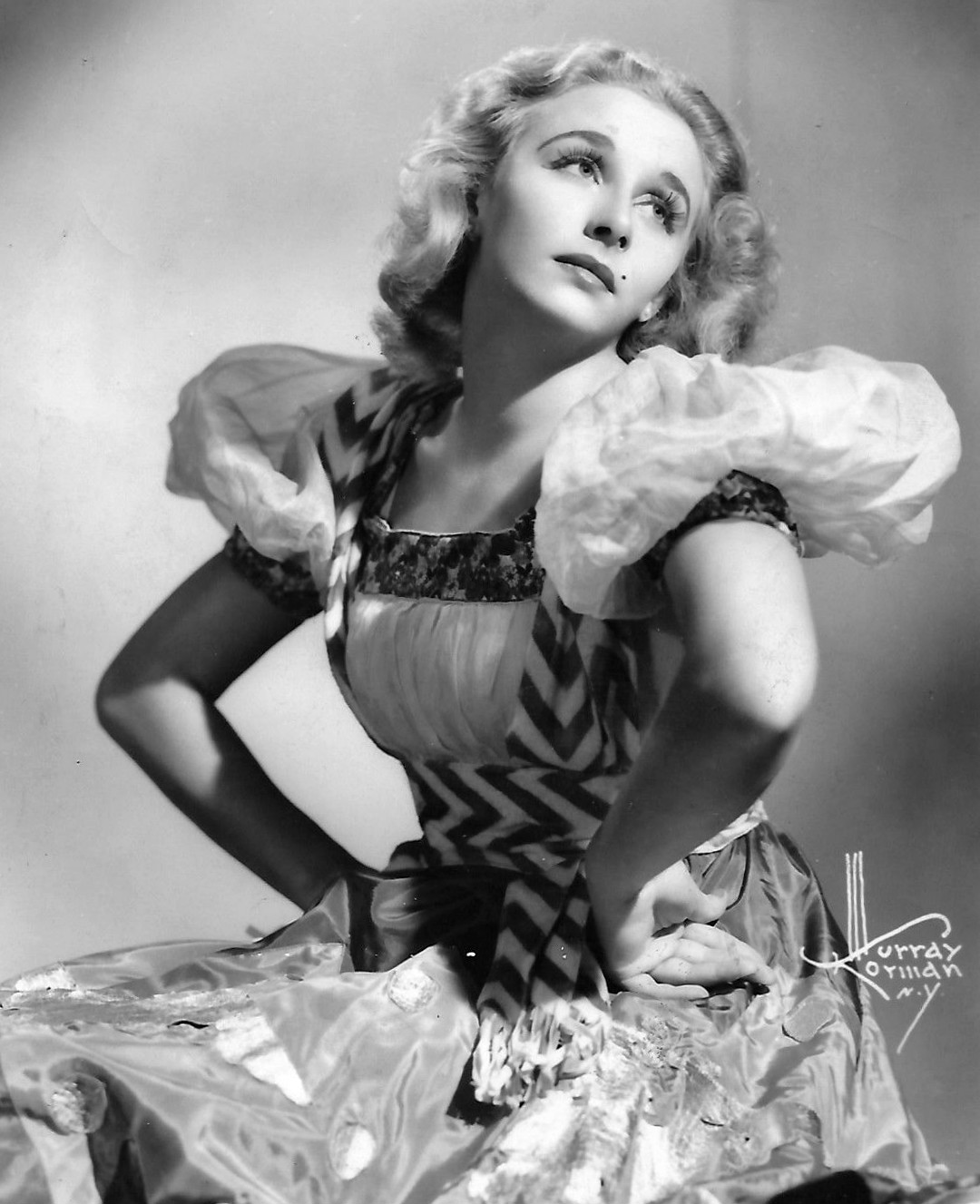
- Vera Ralston in 1942

Personal information
- Full name: Vera Ralston
- Other names: Vera Hrubá Ralston
- Born: Věra Helena Hrubá; July 12, 1919 (other sources cite 1920, 1921, and 1923) Prague, Czechoslovakia (present-day Czech Republic)
- Died: February 9, 2003 Santa Barbara, California, U.S.
- Spouses: Herbert J. Yates (m. 1952; died 1966) Charles de Alva (m. 1973)

Figure skating career
- Country: Czechoslovakia

Vera Ralston (born Věra Helena Hrubá; July 12, 1919 or 1920 or 1921 or 1923 – February 9, 2003) was a Czech and American figure skater and actress. She worked as an actress during the 1940s and 1950s.

== Early life ==
Ralston was born Věra Helena Hrubá in Prague to a Catholic family with a home on the Berounka River. Her father, Rudolf Hrubý, was a jeweler born at the Huta Bankowa steel mill in Dąbrowa, Będzin County, Piotrków Governorate, Russian Empire (today Dąbrowa Górnicza, Silesian Voivodeship, Poland). Her year of birth has been given as 1919, 1920, 1921, and 1923. Her brother, Rudy Ralston, later became a film producer in the United States.

== Skating career ==
As a figure skater, she represented Czechoslovakia in competition under her birth name Věra Hrubá. She competed at the 1936 European Figure Skating Championships and placed 15th. Later that season, she competed at the 1936 Winter Olympics, where she placed 17th. During the games, she personally met and reportedly insulted Adolf Hitler. Hitler asked her if she would like to "skate for the swastika." As she later boasted, "I looked him right in the eye, and said that I'd rather skate on the swastika. The Führer was furious."

Hrubá competed at the 1937 European Figure Skating Championships and placed 7th. She emigrated to the United States in 1941 and became a naturalized citizen in 1946.

=== Results ===
Event	1936	1937
Winter Olympics	17th	
European Championships	15th	7th
Czechoslovak Championships	1st	1st

== Acting career ==
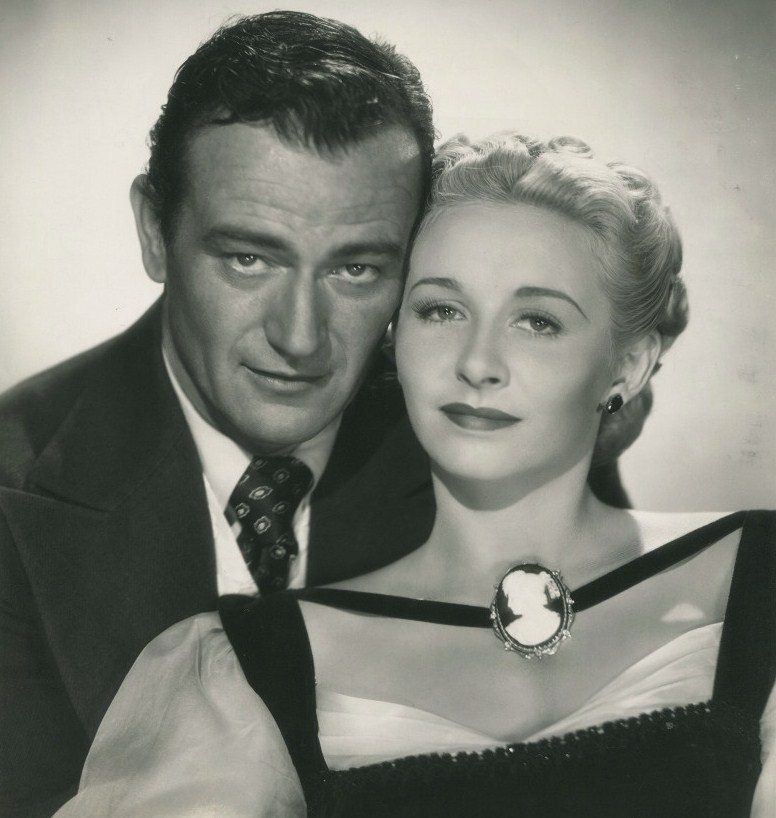
John Wayne and Vera Ralston in Dakota (1945)

Ralston moved to Hollywood with her mother and signed a contract in 1943 with Republic Pictures. During her career she was known as Vera Hrubá Ralston and Vera Hruba Ralston, and, later, simply as Vera Ralston. She normally played an immigrant girl, because of her limited English skills. Among the 26 films Ralston starred in were Storm Over Lisbon with Erich von Stroheim (1944), Dakota (1945) with John Wayne, I, Jane Doe (1947) The Flame,(1948) with John Carroll and Ruth Hussey, The Fighting Kentuckian, also with Wayne (1949), A Perilous Journey with David Brian and Scott Brady (1953), and Fair Wind to Java with Fred MacMurray (1953). She retired from films in 1958. Reportedly only 2 of her 20 films made money.

In 1952, Ralston married Republic studio head Herbert Yates. Yates was nearly 40 years her senior, and reportedly left his wife, with whom he had two grown children, to be with Ralston. Yates used his position as the studio's head executive to obtain roles for Ralston; at one point he was sued by two studio shareholders for using company assets for his own gain by promoting his wife's career. It was alleged that 18 of her 20 films had been flops. Yates' and Vera's relatives were pushed out of Republic and the film business in 1959, the same year Republic's board decided to switch emphasis from film production to distribution. Yates died in 1966, leaving half of his estate ($8 million) to Ralston; she suffered a nervous breakdown shortly thereafter. Eventually, she remarried a businessman 11 years her junior and lived quietly in southern California. She died on February 9, 2003, in Santa Barbara, California, after a long battle with cancer. For her work in films, Ralston has a star in the Hollywood Walk of Fame.

== Filmography ==
Year	Title	Role	Notes
1941	Ice-Capades	Ice-Capades Skater	
1942	Ice-Capades Revue	Ice-Capades Skater	
1944	The Lady and the Monster	Janice Farrell	
1944	Storm Over Lisbon	Maria Mazarek, aka Maritza	
1944	Lake Placid Serenade	Vera Haschek	
1945	Dakota	Sandy	
1946	Murder in the Music Hall	Lila Laughton	
1946	Plainsman and the Lady	Ann Arnesen	
1947	Wyoming	Karen Alderson	
1947	Týden v tichém dome	Sieglová	
1947	The Flame	Carlotta Duval	
1948	I, Jane Doe	Annette Dubois / Jane Doe	
1948	Angel on the Amazon	Christine Ridgeway	
1949	The Fighting Kentuckian	Fleurette De Marchand	
1950	Surrender	Violet Barton	
1951	Belle Le Grand	Daisy Henshaw / Belle Le Grand	
1951	The Wild Blue Yonder	Lt. Helen Landers	
1952	Hoodlum Empire	Marte Dufour	
1953	Fair Wind to Java	Kim Kim	
1953	A Perilous Journey	Francie Landreaux	
1954	Jubilee Trail	Florinda Grove, aka Julie Latour	
1955	Timberjack	Lynne Tilton	
1956	Accused of Murder	Ilona Vance	
1957	Spoilers of the Forest	Joan Milna	
1957	Gunfire at Indian Gap	Cheel Palmer	
1958	The Notorious Mr. Monks	Angela Monks	
1958	The Man Who Died Twice	Lynn Brennon	
