= I, Jane Doe =

1948 film by John H. Auer

- Theatrical release poster
- Directed by: John H. Auer
- Screenplay by: Lawrence Kimble; Decla Dunning
- Produced by: John H. Auer
- Starring: Ruth Hussey; John Carroll; Vera Ralston; Gene Lockhart; John Howard; Benay Venuta
- Cinematography: Reggie Lanning
- Edited by: Richard L. Van Enger
- Music by: Heinz Roemheld
- Production company: Republic Pictures
- Distributed by: Republic Pictures
- Release date: May 25, 1948
- Running time: 85 minutes
- Country: United States
- Language: English

I, Jane Doe is a 1948 American drama war film directed by John H. Auer and written by Lawrence Kimble and Decla Dunning. The film stars Ruth Hussey, John Carroll, Vera Ralston, Gene Lockhart, John Howard and Benay Venuta.

== Plot ==
When the police find a French woman next to the bullet-ridden body of Stephen Curtis, she refuses to give her identity. She is arrested and goes on trial as "Jane Doe", and is convicted of murder and sentenced to death.

Stephen's widow Eve Curtis suddenly turns up. A former attorney, Eve decides to return to her practice and personally represent her husband's condemned killer. It is discovered that Jane Doe is several months pregnant. Her execution is delayed until after the baby is born, at which point a persuasive Eve gains her a new hearing in court.

Jane Doe tells her story. Her real name is Annette Dubois. She was in France on the day the American pilot Stephen Curtis's plane was shot down by anti-aircraft fire. After hiding him at great risk and faking Stephen's death to fool German soldiers searching for him, they become lovers. Stephen leaves but promises to come back to her. The war ends but he never returns.

Ashamed to tell her family what happened, Annette travels to New York City where he lived, finds Stephen and intends to shoot him. Someone else is there with a gun ahead of her, however: Eve, equally angry with Stephen for making her quit work as a lawyer and wait for him to return, then betraying her.

== Cast ==
- Ruth Hussey as Eve Meredith Curtis
- John Carroll as Stephen Curtis
- Vera Ralston as Annette Dubois / Jane Doe
- Gene Lockhart as Arnold Matson
- John Howard as William Hilton
- Benay Venuta as Phyllis Tuttle
- Adele Mara as Marga-Jane Hastings
- Roger Dann as Julian Aubert
- James Bell as Judge Bertrand
- Leon Belasco as Duroc
- John Litel as Horton
- Eric Feldary as Reporter
- Francis Pierlot as Father Martin
- Marta Mitrovich as Marie
- John Albright as Reporter
