= Plainsman and the Lady =

1946 film by Joseph Kane

- Theatrical release poster
- Directed by: Joseph Kane
- Screenplay by: Richard Wormser
- Story by: Michael Uris; Ralph Spence
- Produced by: Joseph Kane
- Starring: Wild Bill Elliott; Vera Ralston; Gail Patrick; Joseph Schildkraut
- Cinematography: Reggie Lanning
- Edited by: Fred Allen
- Music by: George Antheil
- Production company: Republic Pictures
- Distributed by: Republic Pictures
- Release date: November 11, 1946
- Running time: 87 minutes
- Country: United States
- Language: English

Plainsman and the Lady is a 1946 American Western film directed by Joseph Kane and starring Wild Bill Elliott, Vera Ralston, Gail Patrick and Joseph Schildkraut. It was produced and distributed by Republic Pictures. It was a larger-budget film than the second features Republic traditionally produced, as owner Herbert Yates attempted to gain greater prestige and profits at the box office.

== Plot ==
St. Louis, Missouri in 1859. The wealthy owner of the Pony Express Michael H. Arnesen partners with gambler and frontiersman Sam Colton to protect his mail service from attacks from Native American warriors and bandits working for his competitor, stagecoach owner Peter Marquette. Things are complicated by the fact that Arnesen's wife Cathy is in love with Marquette. Colton himself falls for Arnesen's daughter Ann.

== Cast ==
- Wild Bill Elliott as Sam Colton
- Vera Ralston as Ann Arnesen
- Gail Patrick as Cathy Arnesen
- Joseph Schildkraut as Peter Marquette
- Andy Clyde as Durango
- Don "Red" Barry as Feisty
- Raymond Walburn as Judge Winters
- Reinhold Schünzel as Michael H. Arnesen
- Russell Hicks as Sen. Gwin
- William B. Davidson as Mr. Russell
- Paul Hurst as Al
- Charles Judels as Manuel Lopez
- Byron Foulger as Mr. Simmons
- Jack Lambert as Sival
- Hal Taliaferro as Pete
- Stuart Hamblen as Matt
- Noble Johnson as Wassao
- Eva Puig as Anita Lopez
- Eddy Waller as Fred Willats
- Pierre Watkin as Sen. Allen
- Joseph Crehan as Postmaster General
- Martin Garralaga as Alvarades
- Rex Lease as Croupier
- Roy Barcroft as Cowboy
- Charles Morton as Doctor
- Hank Bell as Yard Master
