= Fair Wind to Java =

1953 film by Joseph Kane

- Theatrical release poster
- Directed by: Joseph Kane
- Written by: Garland Roark (novel)
- Screenplay by: Richard Tregaskis
- Produced by: Joseph Kane
- Starring: Fred MacMurray; Vera Ralston
- Cinematography: Jack Marta
- Edited by: Richard L. Van Enger
- Music by: Victor Young
- Production company: Republic Pictures
- Distributed by: Republic Pictures
- Release date: April 28, 1953 (United States)
- Running time: 92 minutes
- Country: United States
- Language: English
- Budget: $2 million or $1,039,648
- Box office: $1.3 million (US)

Fair Wind to Java is a 1953 American adventure film in Trucolor from Republic Pictures, produced and directed by Joseph Kane, that stars Fred MacMurray and Vera Ralston. With special effects by the Lydecker brothers, the film was based on the 1948 novel of the same name by Garland Roark.

The film tells the story of an American sea captain who voyages in search of diamonds on a volcanic island and must contend with various mysteries, pirates, and finally an exploding volcano (based on the 1883 eruption of the island of Krakatoa).

== Plot ==
In 1883, the Boston company that owns the merchant sailing ship Gerrymander gives her captain, Captain Boll, six months to show a profit in the Netherlands East Indies. Facing both pirates and a Dutch trade exclusion policy preventing foreigners from carrying goods between ports, Boll looks to make a profit another way. On Java, an Indonesian, whose life Boll once saved, tells Boll that native divers salvaged a fortune in diamonds from the sunken ship Pieterzoon. He sends Boll to a Chinese junk captain with a captive, the woman Kim Kim, a dancer at the sultan's palace before the Chinese enslaved her; she knows the diamonds' location.

Boll violates Dutch anti-slavery laws by buying Kim Kim and smuggling her aboard Gerrymander. Flint, the ship's first mate, finds out why Boll purchased her and threatens to turn the captain over to the Dutch if not given half the diamonds.

Pulo Besar, a notorious pirate posing as the naturalized Dutch citizen "Saint" Ebenezer, becomes aware that Kim Kim is aboard Gerrymander. He informs the Dutch authorities, and they search the ship but do not find her (she is hiding on deck inside a half-filled water cask). The ship's crew find her there, and Boll insists that they treat her as a passenger. Later, he must fight one of the crew to protect her honor.

Boll constantly questions Kim Kim about the diamonds. This angers her until he confides that he hopes one day to own his own ship; she tells him that the diamonds are on the island of the fire god, Vishnu. Meanwhile, Flint incites the Gerrymander's crew against Boll, claiming that Kim Kim's presence aboard has made their captain unbalanced. When the mutinous crew confronts Boll, he offers them Flint's half of the fortune, if they leave him in command. They agree, the mutiny ends, and Flint is imprisoned. Gerrymander immediately sets sail in search of Vishnu's island. Boll and Kim Kim become romantically involved during the voyage, but she harbors a fear that Vishnu will become angry if Boll attempts to take the diamonds.

The pirates attack and seize Gerrymander, taking the ship and her crew to Besar's island, where he maintains a palace, servants, and a small army. To get Kim Kim to reveal the diamonds' location, he has her lashed, while also showing her that her mother is his longtime prisoner for the same reason; she has been permanently broken and driven insane. Loyal to Boll, Kim Kim refuses to say anything. Besar instead threatens to kill the captain, and she agrees to cooperate to save Boll's life. Flint, Wilson, and another sailor from Gerrymander offer to cooperate.

Besar, his pirates, Kim Kim, Flint, and Wilson set sail for Vishnu's island. Meanwhile, Gerrymander's crew escape and set Boll free. They take back control of their ship and set out in pursuit. To keep from losing Besar's ship during a moonless night, Boll and two of his men row ahead in a black sail-equipped longboat, sending back shrouded signals to Gerrymander. Wilson jumps overboard and swims to Boll's longboat after overhearing where the pirates are heading. His information allows Boll and his crew to identify Vishnu's island as Krakatoa.

Besar's ship and Gerrymander approach Krakatoa, finding its volcano in the early stages of erupting. Gerrymander's men and Besar's pirates head ashore to be the first to reach the diamonds in Vishnu's temple near the smoking volcano's rim. Boll spots Kim Kim on the shore below, and the eruption becomes more destructive, followed by heavy lava flows. He and his crew decide it is too dangerous to continue; they instead rescue Kim Kim and hurriedly up anchor and head out to sea. Besar and some of his pirates reach the temple but are killed by the worsening eruption; below, the remaining pirate crew quickly set sail. Boll knows the island's destruction will generate huge tsunami waves, so he orders his crew to set a sea anchor after they turn Gerrymander toward the now exploding Krakatoa. The ship successfully rides out a series of very large waves, while the pirates try to outrun them, which capsizes their ship and drowns them all.

While the eruption destroyed Krakatoa, ending any hope of recovering the diamonds, Boll tells his crew that there is a 100,000-guilder bounty on Besar, which they will earn by handing over Besar's island to the Dutch. In his capacity as captain of the ship, Boll marries himself to Kim Kim on Gerrymander's quarterdeck while his crew looks on.

== Cast ==
- Fred MacMurray as Capt. Boll
- Vera Ralston as Kim Kim
- Robert Douglas as Saint Ebenezer / Pulo Besar
- Victor McLaglen as O'Brien
- John Russell as Flint
- Buddy Baer as King
- Claude Jarman Jr. as Chess
- Grant Withers as Jason Blue
- Howard Petrie as Reeber
- Paul Fix as Wilson
- William Murphy as Ahab
- Sujata Rubener as Dancer (as Sujata)
- Philip Ahn as Gusti
- Stephen Bekassy as Lieutenant
- Keye Luke as Pidada
- Virginia Brissac as Bintang
- Richard Reeves as Hoppo Two

== Production ==
Fair Wind to Java was filmed on Point Dume in Malibu, California, and on the Republic Pictures backlot in the Studio City district of Los Angeles, California. Vera Ralston claimed that shots of Java inserted in the film were made by John Ford, though other sources claim location shots were done in Hilo, Hawaii, by Bud Thackery.

Howard and Theodore Lydecker filmed the ship and volcano sequences on Mono Lake in Mono County, California, using large miniatures constructed for a realistic scale appearance. A 26-foot (8-meter) model of Gerrymander was built, as was a model of Besar's lateen-rigged pirate ship; a miniature volcano, constructed on one of the rocky outcrops along the lake's shoreline, served as Krakatoa. Miniature palm trees and huts were placed along the lake shore to simulate the Indonesian coast. For the final eruption, bags of cement were used to simulate Krakatoa's volcanic plume. The remains of the model volcano built at Lake Mono still existed as of 2014; it had been adapted for use as a field base for bird researchers.

The tsunami scenes depicting Gerrymander riding out multiple waves, and the swamping and sinking of Besar's pirate ship, were created by filming both large models in the Pacific Ocean surf of a California beach.

The 1969 disaster film Krakatoa, East of Java tells the story of an attempt to salvage a fortune in pearls from a submerged shipwreck lying very near Krakatoa during its 1883 eruption; it bears many similarities to the plot of Fair Wind to Java (the volcano is actually located west of Java).

== Theatrical release and box office ==
Fair Wind to Java was released theatrically in the United States on April 28, 1953; in France on August 20, 1954; in Spain on July 11, 1955; and in Denmark on September 13, 1954. Republic's box office receipts totaled $1,300,000.

== Restoration ==
After the University of California, Los Angeles Film and Television Archive restored Fair Wind to Java with funding from The Film Foundation. Martin Scorsese presented a showing of the film in 2006, calling it "the epitome of a Saturday afternoon matinee picture".

== Home media ==
Fair Wind to Java was released on video by Hollywood Scrapheap on a region-free, limited-availability BD-R in a standard movie poster DVD snapcase. As of December 2021, it was still available on disc via several different online outlets. It was also available for streaming rental via Prime Video.
