= Wake of the Red Witch =

1948 film by Edward Ludwig

- Theatrical release poster
- Directed by: Edward Ludwig
- Screenplay by: Harry Brown; Kenneth Gamet
- Based on: Wake of the Red Witch by Garland Roark
- Produced by: Edmund Grainger
- Starring: John Wayne; Gail Russell; Gig Young; Adele Mara; Luther Adler; Eduard Franz; Grant Withers; Henry Daniell; Paul Fix; Jeff Corey
- Cinematography: Reggie Lanning
- Edited by: Richard L. Van Enger
- Music by: Nathan Scott
- Production company: Republic Pictures
- Distributed by: Republic Pictures
- Release dates: December 30, 1948 (Houston, Texas); March 1, 1949 (United States)
- Running time: 106 minutes
- Country: United States
- Language: English
- Budget: $1,200,343 or $1 million or $1,397,445
- Box office: $2.1 million or $2.5 million or $2,836,174 (as at 27 March 1953)

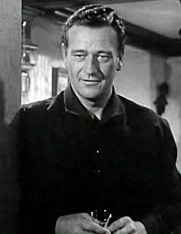
John Wayne

Wake of the Red Witch is a 1948 American adventure film directed by Edward Ludwig, produced by Edmund Grainger and starring John Wayne, Gail Russell, Gig Young, Adele Mara and Luther Adler. It is based upon the 1946 novel of the same name written by Garland Roark. The film is one of the few A-level features produced by Republic Pictures, as it had a relatively high production budget. It became one of Republic's most successful releases.

John Wayne stars as a sea captain in the early 1860s East Indies seeking revenge against a wealthy shipping magnate.

== Plot ==
Two men of the sea carry an ongoing rivalry: Mayrant Sidneye, owner of the shipping company Batjak Limited, and Captain Ralls.

Ralls is the ruthless captain of the Red Witch, Batjak's flagship. He deliberately wrecks and sinks the ship and its cargo of gold bullion worth five million dollars. He escapes a charge of barratry when Batjak unexpectedly withdraws its complaint.

Ralls and his first mate Sam Rosen become fishermen on a schooner and follow a treasure map to an uncharted island, where they are greeted by Sidneye; the map was a ploy to lure Ralls to the island so that Sidneye could deal with Ralls in his own way.

A series of flashbacks describes how Ralls and Sidneye first met and how Ralls became captain of the Red Witch. Ralls and Sidneye had fallen in love with the same beautiful woman, Angelique. When Ralls accidentally killed Angelique's uncle, she married Sidneye even though she loved Ralls. When Angelique became ill and was dying, Ralls heard the news and returned to the island, and Angelique died in his arms there. Ralls' deliberate sinking of the Red Witch was an act of revenge against Sidneye for depriving him of the woman he loved.

Returning to the present, Ralls and Sidneye strike a deal: Ralls will reveal the exact location of the wreck of the Red Witch in exchange for a portion of the gold recovered from it. But when the salvage operation is to begin, it is discovered that the wreck is resting precariously, half on an underwater ledge and half hanging over deeper water, making salvage extremely dangerous. Ralls is the only one willing to take the risk. He dives down to the wreck and manages to secure a portion of the ship's gold, but the wreck begins to slide off the ledge. Falling debris traps Ralls inside the wreck, and he is killed when the descending wreckage severs his air hose.

== Cast ==
- John Wayne as Captain Ralls
- Gail Russell as Angelique Desaix
- Gig Young as Sam Rosen
- Adele Mara as Teleia Van Schreeven
- Luther Adler as Mayrant Ruysdaal Sidneye
- Eduard Franz as Harmenszoon Van Schreeven
- Grant Withers as Captain Wilde Youngeur
- Henry Daniell as Jacques Desaix
- Paul Fix as Antonio "Ripper" Arrezo
- Jeff Corey as Mr. Loring
- Duke Kahanamoku as Ua Nuke
- Dennis Hoey as Capt. Munsey
- Erskine Sanford as Dr. van Arken
- John M. Pickard as Second Diver (uncredited)
- James Dime as a seaman

Wayne, Republic's top star, was considered for the lead role from the project's inception. Charles Laughton was also mentioned as a possible member of the cast.

Wake of the Red Witch represented the second screen teaming of John Wayne and Gail Russell. During production of their first pairing, the previous year's Angel and the Badman, Wayne and Russell allegedly began an offscreen affair, although both would later deny this claim.

== Development ==
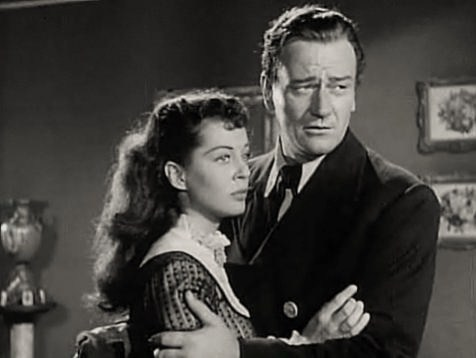
Russell and Wayne

Published in 1946, the novel Wake of the Red Witch was written by Garland Roark, a Texan who worked in advertising. The Washington Post called it "a smashing melodrama." The book became a bestseller, ultimately selling more than one million copies.

The film has numerous similarities to Cecil B. DeMille's earlier seagoing spectacular Reap the Wild Wind (1942) apart from the titles ("RWW" and "WRW") such as both starring John Wayne as a sea captain in two of his few roles as an anti-hero and his similar demise in both films.

Republic Pictures paid $100,000 for the screen rights to the book, reportedly the highest amount that the studio had ever paid. Republic, a Poverty Row studio in its early days, primarily produced low- and medium-budget Westerns and serials. Edmund Grainger was assigned as producer.

The film was part of an attempt by Republic head Herbert Yates to increase the prestige of the studio's output. Other Republic films around this time include Orson Welles' version of Macbeth and The Red Pony starring Robert Mitchum. Wake of the Red Witch was to be a prestige production, and it was allocated one of the largest film budgets in Republic's history, originally $1.8 million, although the sum was later reduced to $1 million.

== Production ==
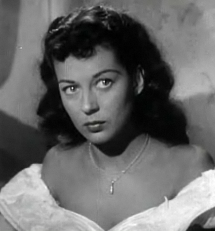
Gail Russell

Filming began in July 1948. The island scenes were shot at Rancho Santa Anita, with sea footage filmed at the isthmus on Catalina Island. Extensive post-production work was required to film the underwater scenes.

== Legacy ==
John Wayne cofounded a production company in 1952 originally called Wayne/Fellows Productions (together with producer Robert Fellows). When Fellows withdrew from the company two years later, Wayne renamed it Batjac Productions after the shipping firm named Batjak in the film. His secretary misspelled it as Batjac on the corporation papers and Wayne let it stand.

A restoration of Wake of the Red Witch coproduced by Paramount Pictures, The Film Foundation and Martin Scorsese premiered at New York City's Museum of Modern Art on August 9, 2018. The screening was part of the museum's program of showcasing 30 restored films from the library of Republic Pictures, curated by Scorsese.

== See also ==
- John Wayne filmography
