= The Flame (1947 film) =

1947 American crime film noir directed by John H. Auer

- Theatrical release poster
- Directed by: John H. Auer
- Screenplay by: Lawrence Kimble
- Story by: Robert T. Shannon
- Produced by: John H. Auer
- Starring: John Carroll; Vera Ralston; Robert Paige; Broderick Crawford
- Cinematography: Reggie Lanning
- Edited by: Richard L. Van Enger
- Music by: Heinz Roemheld
- Color process: Black and white
- Production company: Republic Pictures
- Distributed by: Republic Pictures
- Release date: November 24, 1947
- Running time: 97 minutes
- Country: United States
- Language: English

The Flame is a 1947 American film noir crime film produced and directed by John H. Auer and starring John Carroll, Vera Ralston, Robert Paige and Broderick Crawford. It was made and distributed by Republic Pictures.

== Plot ==
A man (Carroll) induces an ambitious nurse (Ralston), who is his girlfriend, to marry his rich, terminally-ill brother (Paige) for money. Things get complicated when Ralston falls in love with Paige.

== Cast ==
- John Carroll as George MacAllister
- Vera Ralston as Carlotta Duval
- Robert Paige as Barry MacAllister
- Broderick Crawford as Ernie Hicks
- Henry Travers as Dr. Mitchell
- Hattie McDaniel as Celia
- Blanche Yurka as Aunt Margaret
- Constance Dowling as Helen Anderson
- Victor Sen Yung as Chang
- Harry Cheshire as the Minister
- John Miljan as Detective
- Garry Owen as Detective
- Eddie Dunn as Police Officer
- Jeff Corey as Stranger (uncredited)

== Reception ==
=== Critical response ===
The critic at The New York Times panned the film, "The sole distinction of The Flame, a rambling, inept bit of claptrap which sidled into the Gotham yesterday, is the bleakly amusing fact that most of the performers seem either bored or amused with the whole thing. And no wonder. There is a grim, unimaginative which-brother-do-I-love plot, centering on Vera Ralston."

Film historian and critic Hal Erickson discussed the production values in his brief review, "In terms of both budget and histrionic level, The Flame is one of the most lavish of Republic Pictures' late-1940s productions."

== See also ==
- List of American films of 1947
