= Virginia Grey =

American actress (1917–2004)

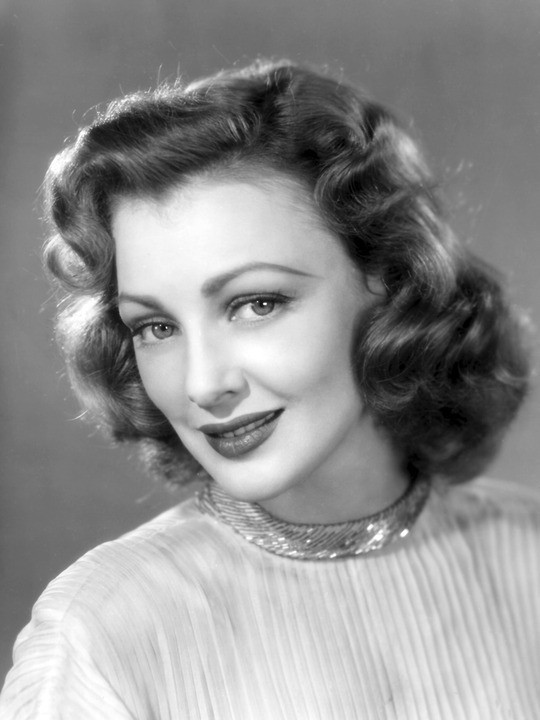
- Grey in 1941
- Born: March 22, 1917; Edendale, California, U.S.
- Died: July 31, 2004 (aged 87); Woodland Hills, California, U.S.
- Occupations: Actress, singer
- Years active: 1927–1977
- Known for: All That Heaven Allows; The Women

Virginia Grey (March 22, 1917 – July 31, 2004) was an American actress who appeared in over 100 films and several radio and television shows from the 1930s to the early 1980s. She was romantically involved with Clark Gable for several years, after his wife, Carole Lombard's, untimely death.

== Biography ==
Grey was born on March 22, 1917, in Edendale, California, the youngest of three daughters of Florence Anna Grey (née Pauly; 1890—1930) and director Ray Grey. One of her early babysitters was film star Gloria Swanson. Grey debuted at 10 in the silent film Uncle Tom's Cabin (1927) as Little Eva. She continued acting for a few more years but left acting for three years to finish her education.

Grey abandoned her training as a nurse and returned to films in the 1930s, with bit parts and work as an extra. She eventually signed a contract with Metro-Goldwyn-Mayer (MGM) and appeared in several films, including The Hardys Ride High (1939) with Mickey Rooney, Another Thin Man (1939) with William Powell, Hullabaloo (1940), and The Big Store (1941) with the Marx Brothers.

She left MGM in 1942 and worked steadily for several film studios over subsequent years. During the 1950s and 1960s, producer Ross Hunter frequently included Grey in his popular soap melodramas such as All That Heaven Allows, Back Street, and Madame X.

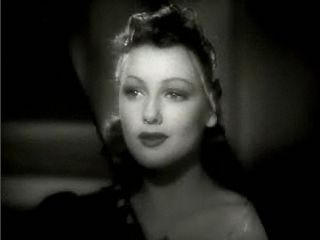
Grey in 1938 Dramatic School

Grey had an intermittent love affair with Clark Gable in the 1940s. After Gable's wife Carole Lombard died and he returned from military service, Gable and Grey were often seen together at restaurants and nightclubs. Many, including Grey herself, expected Gable to marry her, and tabloids often speculated on a wedding announcement. It was a great surprise when Gable hastily married Lady Sylvia Ashley in 1949, leaving Grey heartbroken. Gable divorced Ashley in 1952, never rekindling his romance with Grey, who never married.

In 1951, Grey portrayed Blanche Bickerson on the syndicated comedy TV series The Bickersons. She was a regular on television in the 1950s and 1960s, appearing in episodes of Playhouse 90, U.S. Marshal, The Jane Wyman Show, General Electric Theater, The DuPont Show with June Allyson, Your Show of Shows, Red Skelton, Wagon Train (“The Honorable Don Charlie Story,” "The Kate Parker Story," "The Major Adams Story"), Bonanza, Marcus Welby, M.D., Love, American Style, Burke's Law, The Virginian, Peter Gunn, Ironside, among many other series.

Politically, Grey was a staunch conservative and a highly active member of the Republican Party within the Hollywood community. She maintained formal institutional involvement across several conservative political circles, including memberships in the Hollywood Republican Committee, the Motion Picture Alliance for the Preservation of American Ideals, and the Bel-Air Republican Women's Group. Through these organizations, Grey collaborated closely with both male and female conservative contemporaries in the film industry to organize, fundraise, and campaign heavily for numerous Republican presidential candidates, most notably Wendell Willkie, Thomas E. Dewey, Dwight D. Eisenhower, Barry Goldwater, Richard Nixon, Gerald Ford, and Ronald Reagan.

Grey was a lifelong, devout Roman Catholic who remained an active, dedicated parishioner of the Catholic Church throughout her entire life, a fact later confirmed by her family and biographers to correct longstanding internet hoaxes falsely claiming she had converted to Mormonism, which she never did. Beyond her regular parish involvement, she dedicated significant time to supporting various Catholic ministries, most notably Catholic Charities and St. Anne's.

== Death ==
Grey died on July 31, 2004, at age 87, in Woodland Hills, California, while a resident at the Motion Picture Home. She was cremated, and her ashes were scattered at sea on August 6, 2004, off the Los Angeles coast.

Anna Torv portrayed her in the HBO miniseries The Pacific, which recounts her friendship with John Basilone on the latter's war bond tour.

== Filmography ==
Year	Film	Role	Director	Notes
1927	Uncle Tom's Cabin	Eva	Harry A. Pollard	
1928	The Michigan Kid	a child	Irvin Willat	
1928	Heart to Heart	Hazel Boyd	William Beaudine	
1928	Jazz Mad		F. Harmon Weight	uncredited
1931	Misbehaving Ladies	Hazel Boyd	William Beaudine	
1931	Palmy Days	Goldwyn Girl	A. Edward Sutherland	uncredited
1933	Secrets	a Child	Frank Borzage	uncredited
1934	Dames	Chorus Girl	Busby Berkeley	uncredited
1934	The St. Louis Kid	Second Girl	Ray Enright	scenes deleted
1934	The Firebird	Autograph Seeker	William Dieterle	uncredited
1935	Gold Diggers of 1935	Chorus Girl	Busby Berkeley	uncredited
1935	Don't Bet on Blondes	Girl with Henry	Robert Florey	uncredited
1935	She Gets Her Man	Club Woman	William Nigh	uncredited
1936	The Great Ziegfeld	Ziegfeld Girl	Robert Z. Leonard	uncredited
1936	Old Hutch	Pirate's Club Customer	J. Walter Ruben	uncredited
1936	Our Relations	Ethel, Girl with Dave in Drugstore	Harry Lachman	
1937	Secret Valley	Joan Carlo	Howard Bretherton	
1937	Bad Guy	Kitty	Edward L. Cahn	
1937	Rosalie	Mary Callahan	W. S. Van Dyke	
1938	The Canary Comes Across	Ann Clayton		Short film
1938	Test Pilot	Sarah	Victor Fleming	
1938	Billy Rose's Casa Mañana Revue	Virginia Mason		Short film
1938	Snow Gets in Your Eyes	June		Short film
1938	Ladies in Distress	Sally	Gus Meins	
1938	The Shopworn Angel	Chorus Girl #1	H.C. Potter	uncredited
1938	Rich Man, Poor Girl	Miss Selma Willis	Reinhold Schünzel	
1938	Youth Takes a Fling	Madge	Archie Mayo	
1938	Dramatic School	Simone	Robert B. Sinclair	
1939	Idiot's Delight	Shirley Laughlin	Clarence Brown	
1939	Broadway Serenade	Pearl	Robert Z. Leonard	
1939	The Hardys Ride High	Consuela MacNish	George B. Seitz	
1939	The Women	Pat	George Cukor	
1939	Thunder Afloat	Susan Thorson	George B. Seitz	
1939	Another Thin Man	Lois MacFay	W. S. Van Dyke	
1940	Three Cheers for the Irish	Patricia Casey	Lloyd Bacon	
1940	The Captain Is a Lady	Mary Peabody	Robert B. Sinclair	
1940	The Golden Fleecing	Lila Hanley	Leslie Fenton	
1940	Hullabaloo	Laura Merriweather	Edwin L. Marin	
1940	Keeping Company	Anastasia Atherton	S. Sylvan Simon	
1941	Blonde Inspiration	Margie Blake	Busby Berkeley	
1941	Washington Melodrama	Teddy Carlyle	S. Sylvan Simon	
1941	The Big Store	Joan Sutton	Charles Reisner	
1941	Whistling in the Dark	'Fran' Post	S. Sylvan Simon	
1942	Mr. and Mrs. North	Jane Wilson	Robert B. Sinclair	
1942	Tarzan's New York Adventure	Connie Beach	Richard Thorpe	
1942	Grand Central Murder	Sue Custer	S. Sylvan Simon	
1942	Bells of Capistrano	Jennifer Benton	William Morgan	
1942	Tish	Katherine 'Kit' Bowser Sands	S. Sylvan Simon	
1942	Secrets of the Underground	Terry Parker	William Morgan	
1943	Idaho	Terry Grey	Joseph Kane	
1943	Stage Door Canteen	Virginia Grey	Frank Borzage	
1943	Sweet Rosie O'Grady	Edna Van Dyke	Irving Cummings	
1944	Strangers in the Night	Dr. Leslie Ross	Anthony Mann	
1945	Grissly's Millions	Katherine Palmor Bentley	John English	
1945	Blonde Ransom	Vicki Morrison	William Beaudine	
1945	Flame of Barbary Coast	Rita Dane	Joseph Kane	
1945	Men in Her Diary	Diana Lee	Charles Barton	
1946	Smooth as Silk	Paula Marlowe	Charles Barton	
1946	House of Horrors	Joan Medford	Jean Yarbrough	
1946	Swamp Fire	Janet Hilton	William H. Pine	
1947	Wyoming	Lila Regan	Joseph Kane	
1947	Unconquered	Diana	Cecil B. DeMille	
1948	Glamour Girl	Lorraine Royle	Arthur Dreifuss	
1948	Who Killed Doc Robbin	Ann Loring	Bernard Carr	
1948	So This Is New York	Ella Goff Finch	Richard Fleischer	
1948	Miraculous Journey	Patricia	Sam Newfield (as Peter Stewart)	
1948	Unknown Island	Carole Lane	Jack Bernhard	
1948	Leather Gloves	Jane Gilbert	William Asher	
1948	Mexican Hayride	Montana	Charles Barton	
1948	Jungle Jim	Dr. Hilary Parker	William Berke	
1949	The Threat	Carol	Felix E. Feist	
1950	Highway 301	Mary Simms	Andrew L. Stone	
1950	Hurricane at Pilgrim Hill	Janet Smedley Adams	Richard L. Bare	
1951	Three Desperate Men	Laura Brock	Sam Newfield	
1951	Bullfighter and the Lady	Lisbeth Flood	Budd Boetticher	
1951	Slaughter Trail	Lorabelle Larkin	Irving Allen	
1952	Desert Pursuit	Mary Smith	George Blair	
1953	A Perilous Journey	Abby	R. G. Springsteen	
1953	The Fighting Lawman	Raquel Jackson	Thomas Carr	
1953	Captain Scarface	Elsa	Paul Guilfoyle	
1954	The Forty-Niners	Stella Walker	Thomas Carr	
1954	Target Earth	Vicki Harris	Sherman A. Rose	
1955	The Eternal Sea	Dorothy Buracker	John H. Auer	
1955	The Last Command	Mrs. Dickinson	Frank Lloyd	
1955	All That Heaven Allows	Alida Anderson	Douglas Sirk	
1955	The Rose Tattoo	Estelle Hohengarten	Daniel Mann	
1956	Accused of Murder	Sandra Lamoreaux	Joseph Kane	
1957	Crime of Passion	Sara Alidos	Gerd Oswald	
1957	Jeanne Eagels	Elsie Desmond	George Sidney	
1958	The Restless Years	Miss Robeson	Helmut Käutner	
1959	No Name on the Bullet	Roseanne Fraden	Jack Arnold	
1960	Portrait in Black	Miss Lee	Michael Gordon	
1961	Tammy Tell Me True	Miss Jenks	Harry Keller	
1961	Back Street	Janey née Smith	David Miller	
1961	Bachelor in Paradise	Camille Quinlaw	Jack Arnold	
1961	Flower Drum Song	Rosalind	Henry Koster	uncredited
1963	Black Zoo	Jenny Brooks	Robert Gordon	
1964	The Naked Kiss	Candy	Samuel Fuller	
1965	Love Has Many Faces	Irene Talbot	Alexander Singer	
1966	Madame X	Mimsy	David Lowell Rich	
1967	Rosie!	Mrs. Peters	David Lowell Rich	
1970	Airport	Mrs. Schultz	George Seaton	
1975	The Lives of Jenny Dolan	Landlady	Jerry Jameson	
1976	Arthur Hailey's the Moneychangers	Miss Callahan	Boris Sagal	
