= Hoodlum Empire =

1952 film by Joseph Kane

- Theatrical release poster
- Directed by: Joseph Kane
- Screenplay by: Bruce Manning; Bob Considine
- Story by: Bob Considine
- Produced by: Herbert J. Yates
- Starring: Brian Donlevy; Claire Trevor; Forrest Tucker; Vera Ralston; Luther Adler; John Russell
- Cinematography: Reggie Lanning
- Edited by: Richard L. Van Enger
- Music by: Nathan Scott
- Production company: Republic Pictures
- Distributed by: Republic Pictures
- Release date: March 5, 1952 (New York)
- Running time: 98 minutes
- Country: United States
- Language: English

Hoodlum Empire is a 1952 American crime film noir directed by Joseph Kane starring Brian Donlevy, Claire Trevor, Forrest Tucker, Vera Ralston, Luther Adler and John Russell. It was inspired by the Kefauver Committee hearings dealing with organized crime.

== Plot ==
Former gangster Joe Gray, a World War II hero, now leads a respectable life. When he is summoned to appear before a grand jury to testify against organized-crime activities, his former mobster colleagues try to stop him.

== Cast ==
- Brian Donlevy as Senator Bill Stephens
- Claire Trevor as Connie Williams
- Forrest Tucker as Charley Pignatalli
- Vera Ralston as Marte Dufour
- Luther Adler as Nick Mancani
- John Russell as Joe Gray
- Gene Lockhart as Senator Tower
- Grant Withers as Rev. Simon Andrews
- Taylor Holmes as Benjamin Lawton
- Roy Barcroft as Louis Draper
- William Murphy as Pete Dailey
- Richard Jaeckel as Ted Dawson
- Don Beddoe as Senator Blake
- Roy Roberts as Chief Thales
- Richard Benedict as Tanner
- Phillip Pine as Louis "Louie" Barretti
- Damian O'Flynn as Ralph Foster
- Pat Flaherty as Mikkelson

== Reception ==
In a contemporary review for The New York Times, critic A. H. Weiler wrote: "[I]t is a familiar format Bob Considine and Bruce Manning have used to fashion a workmanlike, sometimes brisk but hardly inspired script. ... Their efforts to prove that crime should not pay are worth while. But 'Hoodlum Empire'—even up to its climax, when justice triumphs with a bang—is still play acting, which is not nearly as effective as the facts that obviously inspired it."
