= Beyond the Forest =

1949 film noir by King Vidor

- Theatrical release poster
- Directed by: King Vidor
- Screenplay by: Lenore Coffee
- Based on: the novel Beyond the Forest by Stuart D. Engstrand
- Produced by: Henry Blanke
- Starring: Bette Davis; Joseph Cotten
- Cinematography: Robert Burks
- Edited by: Rudi Fehr
- Music by: Max Steiner
- Distributed by: Warner Bros. Pictures
- Release date: October 21, 1949 (United States)
- Running time: 97 minutes
- Country: United States
- Language: English
- Budget: $1,589,000
- Box office: $1,738,000

Beyond the Forest is a 1949 American melodrama directed by King Vidor, and featuring Bette Davis, Joseph Cotten, David Brian, and Ruth Roman. The screenplay is written by Lenore Coffee based on the 1947 novel by Stuart Engstrand.

The film marks Davis's last appearance as a contract actress for Warner, after eighteen years with the studio. She tried several times to walk away from the film (which only caused the production cost to go through the roof), but Warner refused to release her from their employment contract. She remembered the project as "a terrible movie", and her death scene at the end of the film as "the longest death scene ever seen on the screen".

== Plot ==
Rosa Moline is the dissatisfied, restless wife of Lewis, a small-town Wisconsin doctor. She is easily bored, uninterested in her husband's career or in anything to do with her current circumstances. She has long desired a glamorous life, in a world where she can have expensive things and meet truly interesting people.

For over a year, she has been having an affair with Neil Latimer, a Chicago businessman who owns the local hunting lodge. Tired of waiting for him to ask her to marry and move to Chicago, Rosa demands the money owed from Lewis' patients - who are often slow to pay his bills but pay him in produce or with odd jobs - to finance her trip to the city.

Lewis does not yet know about the affair, but he is used to his wife's unease with her life; he discovers what she's done and throws the cash at her, telling her that if she goes to Chicago, she need not come back. Rosa immediately leaves and fully expects Latimer to welcome her. However, he avoids her at first, then when he does meet her, he tells her he is in love with another woman he intends to marry. Devastated, Rosa returns to Wisconsin, where Lewis forgives her. She soon announces that she's pregnant and, briefly, seems to be trying to settle down.

During a party for Moose, the man who tends to the hunting lodge, Latimer shows up. He lets Rosa know that he has changed his mind and wants to marry her. Moose overhears the couple planning for her divorce and their marriage; the next day, as everyone is heading out on a hunting trip, Moose bets that her lover will not want the baby and advises Rosa that she had better tell Latimer about it, or he will. To prevent that eventuality, she shoots and kills Moose during the hunt. She is acquitted of this act by claiming she thought he was a deer.

To Rosa's consternation, Latimer wants to avoid "any dirt" associated with them and Moose's demise; he suggests they wait "a month or so" before they go through with their plans. At home, Lewis assumes that Rosa will come to feel good about having a baby, but Latimer's change of plans, and her inherent resentment of the pregnancy, drives her to confess both her affair with Latimer and that she deliberately murdered Moose. Lewis says that he only cares about his baby and that after she gives birth, she can go wherever she pleases.

From his office window, Lewis happens to see Rosa boarding a bus. He follows her to a neighboring town where she is sitting in a lawyer's office; she reluctantly leaves with him but, on the way home, tricks him into stopping their car and going to the trunk. She gets out of the vehicle and throws herself down an embankment, desperate to abort. The result is peritonitis and a raging fever which makes her delirious. She enlists Jenny, her housekeeper, to help her dress and she leaves the house to catch the train to Chicago. Near the tracks, she collapses and dies.

== Cast ==
- Bette Davis as Rosa Moline
- Joseph Cotten as Doctor Lewis Moline
- David Brian as Neil Latimer
- Ruth Roman as Carol
- Minor Watson as Moose
- Regis Toomey as Sorren
- Dona Drake as Jenny
- Sarah Selby as Mildred Sorren
- Ann Doran - Uncredited
- Eve Miller - Uncredited

== Production ==
The production of Beyond the Forest experienced several director-star contretemps that influenced Vidor's and Davis' evaluation of the film upon its completion.

Film historian David Melville suggests that Warner Bros. Pictures offered Bette Davis, the aging seventeen-year veteran of the studio, the role of Rosa Moline anticipating she would reject the project, a move that would allow executives to void her contract. She completed the film nevertheless, but it would be her last with Warner Bros. Vidor and Davis feuded over direction of the film throughout its filming.

In an especially dramatic scene in the filming where Davis berates her "dull-but-decent doctor husband" (Joseph Cotten), Vidor demanded "greater vehemence" in her delivery. In response, Davis went to Jack Warner to ask that Vidor be replaced with another director, which Warner declined. Vidor was unaware of the request until the shooting was completed. Davis’ complaints concerning Vidor had the opposite effect and spurred Warner executives to cancel her contract, a finale satisfactory to both parties.

The final cut of the movie appeared without the sequence depicting Rosa's abortion, an edit that Vidor only discovered when he viewed the film at a local theater.

== Location ==
The scenes featuring the mythical town of "Loyalton, Wisconsin" were actually shot in Loyalton, California, a small, picturesque village in Sierra County.

== Reception ==
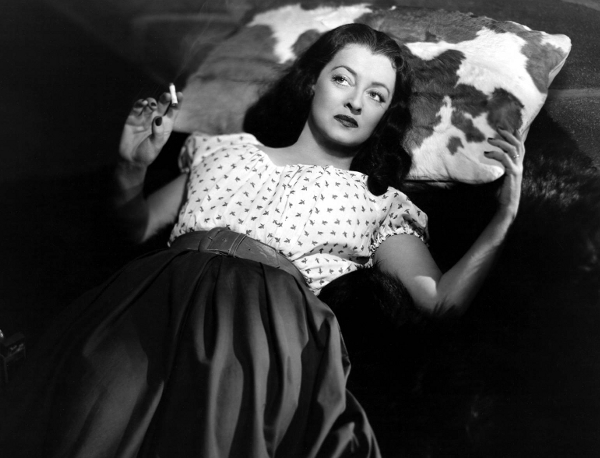
Bette Davis

=== Critical response ===
Film critic Bosley Crowther dismissed the film upon its release, writing:

To be sure, the script by Lenore Coffee offers little for her to do but run through the usual banalities of an infidelity yarn ... For those who have not been embarrassed by pretensions in a fairly long time, let us recommend the climax of this incredibly artificial film—the final scene in which the lady, apparently burning up with a bad case of peritonitis, drags herself out of bed, pulls herself to her mirror, smears make-up on her face and gets dressed in disheveled finery to stagger forth toward the railroad tracks and death. With the clashing refrain of 'Chicago' beating in her head, she pays for her selfish sins and follies. Quite an experience, we'd say ... Not to be coy about it, we can see no 'Oscars' in the offing for this film.

Writing in 2004, Dennis Schwartz was nearly as dismissive, summarizing the plot as "bombastic melodrama", but noting that, "The film's only redeeming value is in its almost camp presentation, which might find some in the audience entertained by the overblown acting on Bette's part (she caricatures herself) and the intense but laughable soap opera story."

On the other hand, writers focused on the film noir movement, such as Alain Silver, have found merit in the movie: "King Vidor's vision of melodrama in small-town America is never darker than in Beyond the Forest...where the arrangement of formal elements possesses the rigor and occasionally the overstatement of a Euripidean tragedy. The revelation that Rosa Moline's "evil" is a role forced on her by a repressive environment is what transforms Vidor's passion play from an updated rendering of Madame Bovary into film noir."

Film critic Adrian Martin wrote in HQ magazine 1999, “History records this as an absurd, minor soapie, but history has it all wrong: it’s up there with the most bruising, passionate, expressionistic melodramas of Vincente Minnelli, Douglas Sirk or Nicholas Ray.”

In February 2020, the film was shown at the 70th Berlin International Film Festival, as part of a retrospective dedicated to King Vidor's career.

=== Censorship ===
The film originally received a "C" classification from the Legion of Decency because of its abortion elements. This classification initially impacted the film's box office, forcing the studio to negotiate cuts in order for the film to be reclassified as a "B".

=== Box office ===
Variety said the film earned $1.5 million.

According to Warner Bros accounts the film earned $1,331,000 domestically and $407,000 foreign.

== Theme ==
Novelist Stuart Engstrand in his 1948 novel of the same name describes anti-heroine Rosa Moline as the "Wisconsin [Madame] Bovary", a reference to 19th Century novelist Gustave Flaubert's doomed character in his 1856 Madame Bovary. Rosa, who considers herself the victim of "[petty] bourgeois mediocrity" is the "small-town girl so consumed with craving for the city [Chicago] that she becomes what looks like a camp caricature of herself."

Vidor's portrayal of Rosa conveys a sympathy for Rosa's life force, "frustrated and deranged though it is." Vidor diverges from Flaubert's social outlook in that he expresses a genuine sympathy for the small factory town and its community relationships that Rosa finds repellent.

Rosa's long sought destination, Chicago, is depicted as a threatening domain of heavy industrial oppression, heightened by a Max Steiner score that emphasizes the city's "brutality". In contrast, Vidor portrays the rural industry in the small town Loyalton, Wisconsin, as comporting with the "human pace" of life in the local community, the "pollution-belching mill" a "tiny blemish."

== Legacy ==
=== Who's Afraid of Virginia Woolf? ===
Vidor's film noir-like melodrama of a middle-aged woman trapped in a small town she despises and married to a husband she regards as a weakling informs Edward Albee's Who's Afraid of Virginia Woolf?. Married couple Martha and George, whose relationship is reminiscent of Bette Davis and Joseph Cotten in Vidor's film, have an exchange over a scene in Beyond the Forest, that opens with Martha invoking the now-famous line, "What a dump.":

"What a dump. Hey, what's that from? ‘What a dump!’"

"How should I know what..."

"Aw, come on! What's it from? You know..."

"...Martha..."

"WHAT'S IT FROM, FOR CHRIST'S SAKE?"

"What's what from?"

"I just told you; I just did it. ‘What a dump!’ Hunh? What's that from?"

"I haven’t the faintest idea what..."

"Dumbbell! It's from some goddamn Bette Davis picture...some goddamn Warner Brothers epic"

"I can’t remember all the pictures that..."

"Nobody's asking you to remember every goddamn Warner Brothers epic...just one! One single little epic! Bette Davis gets peritonitis in the end...she's got this big black fright wig she wears all through the picture and she gets peritonitis, and she's married to Joseph Cotten or something..."

"...somebody..."

Film historian Raymond Durgnat observed that "Vidor's exasperated melodrama" in Beyond the Forest "wears a lot better after the resurgence of high melodrama" that appeared in Edward Albee's Who's Afraid of Virginia Woolf? Comedienne Carol Burnett incorporated the epithet into her routines on The Carol Burnett Show.

=== Accolades ===
Composer Max Steiner was nominated for an Academy Award for Best Music (Scoring of a Dramatic or Comedy Picture) in 1950. The film is listed in Golden Raspberry Award founder John Wilson's book The Official Razzie Movie Guide as one of The 100 Most Enjoyably Bad Movies Ever Made and recognized by the American Film Institute in these lists:

- 2005: AFI's 100 Years...100 Movie Quotes:
  - Rosa Moline: "What a dump." – #62
