= The Avengers (1950 film) =

1950 film by John H. Auer

- Directed by: John H. Auer
- Written by: Lawrence Kimble and Æneas MacKenzie, based on the novel by Rex Beach, (Don Careless)
- Produced by: John H. Auer
- Starring: John Carroll; Fernando Lamas; Adele Mara
- Cinematography: Pablo Tabernero
- Edited by: Mick Audsley
- Music by: Nathan Scott
- Production company: Republic Pictures
- Release date: June 26, 1950 (US)
- Running time: 90 minutes
- Country: United States
- Language: English

The Avengers is a 1950 American swashbuckler film and adventure film directed by John H. Auer and starring John Carroll, Fernando Lamas, and Adele Mara. The picture was shot on location in Argentina.

== Plot ==
In 17th-century colonial Argentina, while trying to find his father's murderer, the adventurer Francisco Suarez is confronted with Colonel Luis Corral, who tries to usurp the Governor's seat. The Colonel is supposed to marry Maria Moreno, with whom Suarez falls in love.

== Cast ==
- John Carroll as Francisco Suarez/Don Careless
- Roberto Airaldi as Colonel Luis Corral
- Adele Mara as Maria Moreno
- Fernando Lamas as André LeBlanc
- Cecile Lezard as Pamela
- Mona Maris as Yvonne
- Juan Olaguivel as Sancho
- Vicente Padula as El Mocho/Hernandez
- Jorge Villoldo as Don Rafael Moreno

== Production ==
The film was shot on location in Buenos Aires. Originally Dolores del Río was supposed to portray Maria Moreno, but she was replaced with Mara because of a dispute with Argentine First Lady Eva Perón, who was originally intended to appear in the film.
