= Hell's Half Acre (1954 film) =

1954 film by John H. Auer

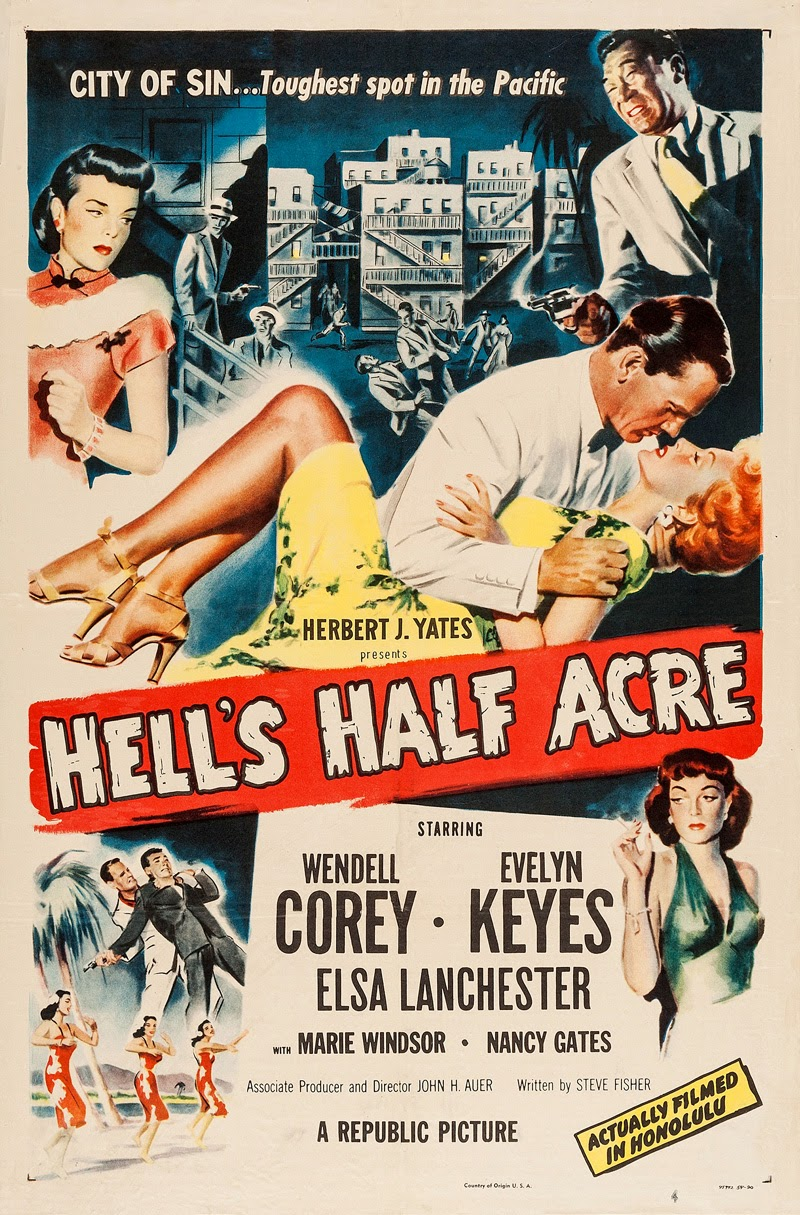
- Theatrical release poster
- Directed by: John H. Auer
- Screenplay by: Steve Fisher
- Produced by: John H. Auer
- Starring: Wendell Corey; Evelyn Keyes; Elsa Lanchester; Marie Windsor
- Cinematography: John L. Russell
- Edited by: Fred Allen
- Music by: R. Dale Butts
- Production company: Republic Pictures
- Distributed by: Republic Pictures
- Release dates: February 26, 1954 (New York City); June 1, 1954 (United States)
- Running time: 90 minutes
- Country: United States
- Language: English

Hell's Half Acre is a 1954 American film noir black and white crime film directed by John H. Auer starring Wendell Corey, Evelyn Keyes and Elsa Lanchester. It was produced and distributed by Republic Pictures.

== Plot ==
A woman whose husband is declared missing in action after Pearl Harbor flies to Hawaii after the war to conduct her own investigation.

Her husband, ex-racketeer Chet Chester (Corey), is actually still alive but changed his identity due to his own criminal activities. However, he is being blackmailed by his former criminal partners, including Roger Kong.

Chester's girlfriend Sally (Nancy Gates) kills one of his enemies, but Chester takes the blame, assuming that he still has enough clout to escape with a light sentence.

The Chief of Police confirms to the wife that the husband was killed at Pearl Harbor and tears up his criminal record to protect his family from shame.

== Cast ==
- Wendell Corey as Chet Chester, aka Randy Williams
- Evelyn Keyes as Donna Williams
- Elsa Lanchester as Lida O'Reilly
- Marie Windsor as Rose
- Nancy Gates as Sally Lee
- Leonard Strong as Ippy
- Jesse White as Tubby Otis
- Keye Luke as Police Chief Dan
- Philip Ahn as Roger Kong
- Clair Widenaar as Jamison
- Robert Costa as "Slim" Novak

== Reception ==
=== Critical response ===
The New York Times gave the film a tepid review with backhanded compliments: "Betwixt the start and the finish, an undemanding spectator will find enough sequences of merit to hold his interest. And the story of destined doom and back-alley murder is not entirely implausible. Miss Keyes, an innocent caught in the tangled web, is a luscious young thing who certainly earns her "A" in acting. She shines nicely in contrast to the denizens of Hell's Half Acre, ostensibly a very unsocial area of Honolulu. John Auer, the director, makes his camera capture the most in picture value of what appears to be some very dingy neighborhoods with a resultant atmosphere that creates a certain element of suspense. His method of direction, aided and abetted by Steve Fisher's economical script, is one of sensible brevity without unnecessary frills."

== See also ==
- God's Little Acre (film)
