= Accused of Murder =

1956 film by Joseph Kane

- Theatrical release poster
- Directed by: Joseph Kane
- Screenplay by: Robert Creighton Williams; W. R. Burnett
- Based on: the novel Vanity Row by W. R. Burnett
- Produced by: Joseph Kane
- Starring: David Brian; Vera Ralston; Sidney Blackmer
- Cinematography: Bud Thackery
- Edited by: Richard L. Van Enger
- Music by: R. Dale Butts
- Color process: Trucolor
- Production company: Republic Pictures
- Distributed by: Republic Pictures
- Release date: December 21, 1956
- Running time: 74 minutes
- Country: United States
- Language: English

Accused of Murder is a 1956 American film noir crime film directed by Joseph Kane and starring David Brian, Vera Ralston and Sidney Blackmer.

== Plot ==
Nightclub singer Ilona Vance is accused of murder because she was the last person to see crooked attorney Frank Hobart alive. Lt. Hargis attempts to prove her innocence.

== Cast ==
- David Brian as Lt. Roy Hargis
- Vera Ralston as Ilona Vance
- Sidney Blackmer as Frank Hobart
- Virginia Grey as Sandra Lamoreaux
- Warren Stevens as Stant
- Lee Van Cleef as Sgt. Emmett Lackey
- Barry Kelley as Police Captain Smedley
- Richard Karlan as Chad Bayliss
- Frank Puglia as Cesar Cipriano
- Elisha Cook Jr. as Whitey Pollock
- Ian MacDonald as Trumble
- Greta Thyssen as Myra Bayliss

== Production ==
The film was based on a novel by W.R. Burnett who said, "It was a very unusual book, and nobody was more surprised than I was when Republic bought it." He was hired to write the script. Vera Hruba Ralston was cast as the female lead, which Burnett said led to the script being changed so her character was innocent, and "The whole goddamned show went out the window."

== See also ==
- List of American films of 1956

== Notes ==
- McGilligan, Patrick; Mate, Ken (1986). "W.R. Burnett: The Outsider". In McGilligan, Patrick (ed.). Backstory: interviews with screenwriters of Hollywood's golden age. University of California press. pp. 49–84.
