= Belle Le Grand =

1951 film by Allan Dwan

- Theatrical release poster
- Directed by: Allan Dwan
- Screenplay by: D.D. Beauchamp
- Story by: Peter B. Kyne
- Produced by: Herbert J. Yates
- Starring: Vera Ralston; John Carroll; William Ching; Hope Emerson; Grant Withers; Stephen Chase; John Qualen; Harry Morgan
- Cinematography: Reggie Lanning
- Edited by: Harry Keller
- Music by: Victor Young
- Production company: Republic Pictures
- Distributed by: Republic Pictures
- Release date: February 14, 1951 (San Francisco)
- Running time: 90 minutes
- Country: United States
- Language: English

Belle Le Grand is a 1951 American Western film directed by Allan Dwan, written by D.D. Beauchamp and starring Vera Ralston and John Carroll. It was released on January 27, 1951 by Republic Pictures.

== Plot ==
In 1850 Natchez, Mississippi, Sally Sinclair is sentenced to prison as an accessory to murder. Upon her release five years later, she vows to acquire the money needed to care for her young sister Nan. By the 1860s, Sally has used her skill at gambling to amass a fortune. She becomes a successful casino owner in San Francisco under the name of Belle Le Grand.

Belle becomes involved in a silver-mine intrigue between rivals Lucky John Kilton and Montgomery Crane, Belle's longtime nemesis. When Nan, now a talented opera singer because of lessons funded by Belle, sings in a concert in San Francisco, she catches the eye of Kilton, although Belle is interested in him.

In Virginia City, Nevada, Belle must use her wits and wealth to help her sister even as she fights her feelings for Kilton and battles Crane, their mutual enemy.

== Cast ==
- Vera Ralston as Sally Sinclair / Belle Le Grand
- John Carroll as John Kilton
- William Ching as Bill Shanks
- Hope Emerson as Emma McGee
- Grant Withers as Shannon
- Stephen Chase as Montgomery Crane
- John Qualen as Corky McGee
- Harry Morgan as Abel Stone
- Charles Cane as Cal
- Thurston Hall as Parkington
- Marietta Canty as Daisy
- Glen Vernon as Bellboy
- Muriel Lawrence as Nan Henshaw
- Emory Parnell as Marshal at Concert

== Production ==
Vera Ralston wears 13 costumes in the film, all created by Republic's chief designer Adele Palmer. The dresses weighed an average of 32 pounds each.

The scenes taking place at the War Memorial Opera House in San Francisco were filmed at the legendary Stage 28 at Universal Studios, constructed for the production of the 1925 film The Phantom of the Opera.

== Release ==
The film's world premiere was held at the Fox Theatre in San Francisco on February 14, 1951. The event included a stage show that featured performers of the past, including the Duncan Sisters in their "Topsy and Eva" routine.

== Reception ==
In a contemporary review for The New York Times, critic Bosley Crowther lamented the film's familiar characters and premise, writing: "[O]ur old friend, the lady gambler, has not noticeably improved with age. As a matter of fact, in this instance, she doesn't seem to have changed one tiny bit since she used to be acted by such ladies as Corinne Griffith and Clara Kimball Young. And the story, as well as the company which she keeps, in this fustian film smacks much more of antique melodrama than it does of contemporary styles."
