= Wyoming (1947 film) =

1947 film

- Directed by: Joseph Kane
- Written by: Lawrence Hazard; Gerald Geraghty
- Produced by: Joseph Kane
- Starring: Wild Bill Elliott; Vera Ralston; John Carroll
- Cinematography: John Alton
- Edited by: Arthur Roberts
- Music by: Ernest Gold; Nathan Scott
- Production company: Republic Pictures
- Distributed by: Republic Pictures
- Release date: July 28, 1947 (United States)
- Running time: 84 minutes
- Country: United States
- Language: English

Wyoming is a 1947 American Western film directed by Joseph Kane and starring Wild Bill Elliott, Vera Ralston and John Carroll. It was produced by Republic Pictures. While Republic specialized in lower-budget second features, it also released more prestigious films such as this in an attempt to compete with the major studios. The film's sets were designed by the art director Frank Hotaling.

== Plot ==
When Karen Alderson returns from an education in Europe to Wyoming in the 1890s she finds that her father's large estate is being encroached by homesteaders. A land war breaks out, partly inspired by a cattle rustler who is using the conflict for his own ends. Karen falls in love with Glenn Forrester, her father's foreman, who tries to prevent bloodshed.

== Cast ==
- Wild Bill Elliott as Charles Alderson
- Vera Ralston as Karen Alderson
- John Carroll as Glenn Forrester
- George 'Gabby' Hayes as Windy Gibson
- Albert Dekker as Duke Lassiter
- Virginia Grey as Lila Regan
- Maria Ouspenskaya as Maria
- Grant Withers as Joe Sublette
- Harry Woods as Ben Jackson
- Minna Gombell as Queenie Lassiter
- Dick Curtis as Ed Lassiter
- Roy Barcroft as Sheriff Niles
- Trevor Bardette as Timmons
- Paul Harvey as Judge Sheridan
- Louise Kane as Karen, at age 9
- Tom London as Will Jennings
- George Chesebro as Henchman Wolff
- Linda Green as Karen, at age 3
- Jack O'Shea as Bartender Steve

== Bibliography ==
- Len D. Martin. The Republic Pictures Checklist: Features, Serials, Cartoons, Short Subjects and Training Films of Republic Pictures Corporation, 1935-1959. McFarland, 1998.
