= Garland Roark =

American novelist

Garland Roark was an American writer (July 26, 1904 – February 9, 1985) known best for his nautical/adventure fiction. His first novel Wake of the Red Witch, published 1946, was a Literary Guild selection and adapted later by Republic Pictures company as a movie featuring John Wayne.

== Life ==
In his own words: "I was born in Groesbeck, Texas. My father died when I was four and my mother began to teach school. Before I was five I had learned to read and write and discovered a talent for drawing which developed over the years until my ambition was to first become a cartoonist, then an illustrator. I delivered the Dallas Journal every morning, taking as pay watercolor lessons, and during the great hurricane of 1915 when I was ten, I was considered quite a hero for having delivered the paper, even though flying tin roofs sailed about me. My education was cut short after a year of college when I went to work to help support my mother and young sister. I was a soda-fountain boy, a sign painter, a door-to-door magazine salesman; I worked in the oil fields and aboard cargo vessels plying the Mexican Gulf and Caribbean Sea, where I met many odd but wonderful characters who appear in my works of sea fiction.

"Later I got a job as a window display artist and fulfilled my desire for education by studying nights. I became an avid reader of every subject and increased my powers of observation of people and life. I began writing during the 1940s and after several rejections my book, Wake of the Red Witch, became a Literary Guild selection in 1946."

- Garland Roark later lived and worked in Nacogdoches, Texas. On September 14, 1939, he married the former Leola Elisabeth Burke. He dedicated to her two of his novels and esteemed her as "the world’s greatest literary critic.” Roark and Leola had two daughters: Sharon and Wanda.
- Favorite hobby: watercoloring.
- Attended West Texas State Teachers College (West Texas A&M University) for one year.
- During 1954, Texas Governor Allan Shivers appointed Roark an Honorary Admiral of the Texas Navy.
- Roark also contributed numerous historical articles to the Houston Chronicle.
- Catalogued as the Garland Roark Collection, Roark's lifework has been deposited in the archives of Stephen F. Austin State University's Ralph W. Steen Library. (To view a list of its contents, access the first External Link below.)

== Works ==
=== Nautical/Adventure Fiction ===
- Wake of the Red Witch (1946). Little, Brown and Company. Novel.
- Fair Wind to Java (1948). Doubleday & Company, Inc. Novel.
- Rainbow in the Royals (1950). Doubleday & Company, Inc. Novel.
- Slant of the Wild Wind (1952). Doubleday & Company, Inc. Novel.
- The Wreck of the Running Gale (1953). Doubleday & Company, Inc. Novel.
- The Diver of the Rebecque (1953). Ziff-Davis Publishing Company. Short story published in the Vol. 1, No. 1 Winter issue of THE SEVEN SEAS pulp magazine, pp. 4–27.
- Star in the Rigging (1954). Doubleday & Company, Inc. Novel.
- The Outlawed Banner (1956). Doubleday & Company, Inc. Novel.
- The Lady and the Deep Blue Sea (1958). Doubleday & Company, Inc. Novel. (Original manuscript title Challenge of the Seas).
- The Gallant Captain Ross (1958). Davis Publications, Inc. Short story published in the Vol. 1, No. 1 October issue of JACK LONDON'S ADVENTURE MAGAZINE, pp. 63–72.
- Tales of the Caribbean (1959). Doubleday & Company, Inc. Short story collection. (cf James Michener's Tales of the South Pacific)
- Should the Wind be Fair (1960). Doubleday & Company, Inc. Novel.
- The Witch of Manga Reva (1962). Doubleday & Company, Inc. Novel.
- Bay of Traitors (1966). Doubleday & Company, Inc. Novel.
- Angels in Exile (1967). Doubleday & Company, Inc. Novel.

=== Western Fiction ===
By the pseudonym George Garland unless otherwise noted:

- Doubtful Valley (1951). Houghton Mifflin Company. Novel.
- The Big Dry (1952). Houghton Mifflin Company. Novel.
- Mogollon (1956). 15-page story published exclusively in newspapers. (e.g. The Star Weekly, Toronto, Canada, July 28, 1956). As Garland Roark.
- Apache Warpath (1959). New American Library/Signet Books. Novel.
- Bugles and Brass (1964). Doubleday & Company, Inc. Novel.
- Hellfire Jackson (1966). Doubleday & Company, Inc. Historical Novel. As Garland Roark. Co-written by Charles Thomas. A Western Writers of America, Spur Award winner.
- The Eye of the Needle (1970). Doubleday & Company, Inc. Novel.
- Slow Wind in the West (1973). Doubleday & Company, Inc. Novel.

=== Miscellaneous ===
- The Cruel Cocks (1957). Doubleday & Company, Inc. Novel about cockfighting in Louisiana.
- Captain Thomas Fenlon: Master Mariner (1958). Julian Messner, Inc. Biographical novel.
- Diamond Six: The Saga of a Fighting Family from Kentucky to Texas (1958). Doubleday & Company, Inc. Biography. Written by William Fielding Smith. Edited by Garland Roark.
- The 25 Flags of Texas (1961). Historical pamphlet.
- The Coin of Contraband (1964). Doubleday & Company, Inc. Biographical novel.
- Drill a Crooked Hole (1968). Doubleday & Company, Inc. Novel re Texas oil fields.

== Movie Adaptations ==
- Wake of the Red Witch (1949).
- Fair Wind to Java (1953).
