= Tahiti Honey =

1943 film by John H. Auer

- Directed by: John H. Auer
- Written by: Lawrence Kimble; Frederick Kohner; H.W. Hanemann
- Produced by: John H. Auer
- Starring: Simone Simon; Dennis O'Keefe; Michael Whalen
- Cinematography: Jack A. Marta
- Edited by: Richard L. Van Enger
- Music by: Marlin Skiles
- Production company: Republic Pictures
- Distributed by: Republic Pictures
- Release date: April 6, 1943
- Running time: 68 minutes
- Country: United States
- Language: English

Tahiti Honey is a 1943 American musical comedy film directed by John H. Auer and starring Simone Simon, Dennis O'Keefe and Michael Whalen.

The film's sets were designed by the art director Russell Kimball.

== Plot ==
A new female singer joins a band she meets in Tahiti, but radically changes their style of music.

== Cast ==
- Simone Simon as Suzette 'Suzie' Durand
- Dennis O'Keefe as Mickey Monroe
- Michael Whalen as Lt. John Barton
- Lionel Stander as Pinkie
- Wally Vernon as Maxie
- Tom Seidel as Wally
- Dan Seymour as Fats
- Edward Gargan as George, the Bartender
- Abigail Adams as Linda
- Earl Audet as Sailor
- Mary Bertrand a sMother
- Edward Biby as Night Club Patron
- Harry Burns as Joe
- Eleanor Counts as Girl with Sailor
- Bess Flowers as Night Club Patron
- Geraldine Jordan as Cigarette Girl
- Eddie Kane as Manager of Miami Hotel
- Forbes Murray as Commander

== Bibliography ==
- Len D. Martin. The Republic Pictures Checklist: Features, Serials, Cartoons, Short Subjects and Training Films of Republic Pictures Corporation, 1935-1959. McFarland, 1998.
