= Timberjack (film) =

1955 film by Joseph Kane

- Directed by: Joseph Kane
- Written by: Allen Rivkin; Dan Cushman
- Produced by: Joseph Kane
- Starring: Sterling Hayden; Vera Ralston; David Brian; Adolphe Menjou; Hoagy Carmichael; Chill Wills
- Cinematography: Jack A. Marta
- Edited by: Richard L. Van Enger
- Music by: Victor Young
- Production company: Republic Pictures
- Distributed by: Republic Pictures
- Release dates: February 4, 1955 (Missoula, Montana); February 18, 1955 (United States)
- Running time: 94 minutes
- Country: United States
- Language: English

Timberjack is a 1955 American Trucolor lumberjack Western film directed by Joseph Kane and starring Sterling Hayden, Vera Ralston, David Brian, Adolphe Menjou, Hoagy Carmichael and Chill Wills. With a very high number of musical sections (including one by Hoagy Carmichael) it approaches a musical in format.

== Plot ==
The film is set in a wilderness area in the north of the United States in the late 19th century. Rival interests in a small town vie for control of the huge forest.

Tim Chipman is an honest lumberman who returns home to find his father murdered. Chipman gets his own back by setting the family timber company against ruthless competitor Croft Brunner. It seems that Brunner is also a rival for the heart of saloon keeper Lynne Tilton. He accidentally kills her father, by punching the old man too hard. Brunner moves the body out of town during the night and dumps it near a river where the men will be logging the next day. He points the blame on rival French loggers. Jingles points out that the father always wore a hat when out, but his hat is missing. Chapman goes to quiz the French loggers.

Lynn accidentally finds her father's hat in Brunner's office and realises that Brunner killed him. She pulls a revolver and shoots him in the left arm and escapes the area with Jingles. Jingles leaves her in the forest. Despite its immense size Brunner manages to quickly track her and they exchange gunfire. She runs down to the railway line where she flags down a tree with Chapman on board.

Chapman ends up in a long distance shoot-out with rifles against Brunner, killing him.

== Cast ==
- Sterling Hayden as Tim Chipman
- Vera Ralston as Lynne Tilton
- David Brian as Croft Brunner
- Adolphe Menjou as 'Sweetwater' Tilton, referred to as "Swifty" throughout the film
- Hoagy Carmichael as Jingles
- Chill Wills as Steve Riika
- Jim Davis as Poole
- Howard Petrie as 'Axe-Handle' Ole
- Ian MacDonald as Pauquette
- Elisha Cook as Punky
- Karl Davis as Red Bush
- Wally Cassell as Veazie
- Tex Terry as Charlie

== Production ==
Timberjack was filmed in Glacier National Park and Western Montana using Trucolor film technology. Sterling Hayden and Elisha Cook Jr. would star in Stanley Kubrick's The Killing a year later. Adolphe Menjou later appeared in Kubrick's Paths of Glory 1957.

== See also ==
- List of American films of 1955
- Sterling Hayden filmography
