= Richard L. Van Enger =

American film editor (1914–1984)

- Occupation: film editor

Richard van Enger (June 20, 1914 – March 20, 1984) was an American film editor who made his debut as an assistant on Gone with the Wind in 1939. Up until his retirement in 1976, he worked on a myriad of projects - mainly B movies - before moving to television in the 1950s where he worked on such shows as Bonanza, The High Chaparral and Alias Smith and Jones. He received an Academy Award nomination for his work on the John Wayne flagwaver Sands of Iwo Jima in 1949.

== Selected filmography ==
- Tahiti Honey (1943)
- The Fighting Seabees (1944)
- Call of the South Seas (1944)
- Atlantic City (1944)
- Earl Carroll Vanities (1945)
- Flame of Barbary Coast (1945)
- Don't Fence Me In (1945)
- Dakota (1945)
- The Mysterious Mr. Valentine (1946)
- I've Always Loved You (1946)
- The Fabulous Texan (1947)
- The Flame (1947)
- I, Jane Doe (1948)
- Angel on the Amazon (1948)
- Wake of the Red Witch (1948)
- Hideout (1949)
- The Fighting Kentuckian (1949)
- Sands of Iwo Jima (1949)
- Singing Guns (1950)
- Salt Lake Raiders (1950
- Surrender (1950)
- Bullfighter and the Lady (1951)
- The Wild Blue Yonder (1951)
- Oklahoma Annie (1952)
- Hoodlum Empire (1952)
- Woman of the North Country (1952)
- Toughest Man in Arizona (1952)
- Thunderbirds (1952)
- A Perilous Journey (1953)
- Sea of Lost Ships (1953)
- Jubilee Trail (1954)
- Johnny Guitar (1954)
- Hell's Outpost (1954)
- Timberjack (1955)
- The Road to Denver (1955)
- A Man Alone (1955)
- The Vanishing American (1955)
- Flame of the Islands (1956)
- The Maverick Queen (1956)
- A Woman's Devotion (1956)
- Accused of Murder (1956)
