= A Perilous Journey =

1953 film by R. G. Springsteen

- Theatrical release poster
- Directed by: R. G. Springsteen
- Screenplay by: Richard Wormser
- Produced by: William J. O'Sullivan
- Starring: Vera Ralston; David Brian; Scott Brady; Charles Winninger; Hope Emerson; Eileen Christy; Leif Erickson
- Cinematography: Jack A. Marta
- Edited by: Richard L. Van Enger
- Music by: Victor Young
- Production company: Republic Pictures
- Distributed by: Republic Pictures
- Release date: April 5, 1953
- Running time: 90 minutes
- Country: United States
- Language: English

A Perilous Journey is a 1953 American Western film directed by R. G. Springsteen and written by Richard Wormser. The film stars Vera Ralston, David Brian, Scott Brady, Charles Winninger, Hope Emerson, Eileen Christy and Leif Erickson. The film was released on April 5, 1953, by Republic Pictures.

== Cast ==
- Vera Ralston as Francie Landreaux
- David Brian as Monty Breed
- Scott Brady as Shard Benton
- Charles Winninger as Captain Eph Allan
- Hope Emerson as Olivia Schuyler
- Eileen Christy as Susan
- Leif Erickson as Richards
- Veda Ann Borg as Sadie
- Ian MacDonald as Sprague
- Virginia Grey as Abby
- Dorothy Ford as Rose
- Ben Cooper as Sam
- Kathleen Freeman as Leah
- Pat Silver as Cathy
- Paul Fierro as Pepe
- Angela Greene as Mavis
- John Dierkes as First Mate
- Fred Graham as Whiskers
