= Angel on the Amazon =

1948 film by John H. Auer

- Directed by: John H. Auer
- Screenplay by: Lawrence Kimble
- Story by: Earl Felton
- Produced by: John H. Auer
- Starring: George Brent; Vera Ralston; Brian Aherne; Constance Bennett
- Cinematography: Reggie Lanning
- Edited by: Richard L. Van Enger
- Music by: Nathan Scott
- Production company: Republic Pictures
- Distributed by: Republic Pictures
- Release date: November 1, 1948 (United States)
- Running time: 86 minutes
- Country: United States
- Language: English

Angel on the Amazon, also known as Drums Along the Amazon, is a 1948 American adventure film directed by John H. Auer and starring George Brent, Vera Ralston, Brian Aherne and Constance Bennett.

== Plot summary ==
After a plane crashes in the Amazonian jungle, its passengers are rescued by a mysterious young woman. They include pilot Jim Warburton, who is fascinated by the woman, Christine Ridgeway, as well as relieved when she and guide Paulo steer him and Karen, a doctor, away from the jungle and its threatening war drums.

Upon reaching Rio de Janeiro safely, Jim and Karen are surprised to encounter Christine again, then shocked when the sight of a strange man causes her to panic. Jim eventually follows the man, who identifies himself as Don Sebastian Ortega and tells a strange tale of how Christine's mother once shot a panther, then killed herself. Christine's father then left her behind.

Jim returns to the United States and finds Anthony Ridgeway, who reveals that Christine is not his daughter but his wife. Jim also eventually learns that Christine has become committed to a sanitarium, where she is now under Karen's care.

== Cast ==
- George Brent as Jim Warburton
- Vera Ralston as Christine Ridgeway
- Brian Aherne as Anthony Ridgeway
- Constance Bennett as Dr. Karen Lawrence
- Fortunio Bonanova as Sebastian Ortega
- Alfonso Bedoya as Paulo
- Gus Schilling as Dean Hartley
- Richard Crane as Johnny MacMahon
- Walter Reed as Jerry Adams
- Ross Elliott as Frank Lane
- Konstantin Shayne as Dr. Jungmeyer

== Bibliography ==
- Kellow, Brian. The Bennetts: An Acting Family. University Press of Kentucky, 2004.
