= Surrender (1950 film) =

1950 film

- Theatrical release poster
- Directed by: Allan Dwan
- Screenplay by: James Edward Grant; Sloan Nibley
- Story by: James Edward Grant
- Produced by: Allan Dwan
- Starring: Vera Ralston; John Carroll; Walter Brennan; Francis Lederer; William Ching; Maria Palmer; Jane Darwell
- Cinematography: Reggie Lanning
- Edited by: Richard L. Van Enger
- Music by: Nathan Scott
- Production company: Republic Pictures
- Distributed by: Republic Pictures
- Release date: September 15, 1950
- Running time: 90 minutes
- Country: United States
- Language: English

Surrender is a 1950 American Western film directed by Allan Dwan, written by James Edward Grant and Sloan Nibley, and starring Vera Ralston, John Carroll, Walter Brennan, Francis Lederer, William Ching, Maria Palmer and Jane Darwell. It was released on September 15, 1950, by Republic Pictures.

== Plot ==
With her husband Henry Vaan in a Texas jail, sultry Violet Barton joins her sister Janet in a border town called La Mirada, where she seduces wealthy newspaperman Johnny Hale into marrying her. Johnny is unaware Violet is a bigamist or that Janet was in love with him.

Johnny's best friend, gambler Gregg Delaney, had been the object of Violet's affections at first before she discovered Johnny was rich. Vaan gets out of jail and tracks Violet down, threatening her with blackmail unless her new husband pays him. Vaan is murdered by Violet, who lets Johnny take the rap. Sheriff Bill Howard places him under arrest.

Johnny and Gregg each suspect the other of killing Vaan, not realizing it was Violet all along. Gregg helps spring Johnny from jail, then flees with Violet after she finally confesses to her various sins. Howard and his posse pursue the fugitives and kill them both.

== Cast ==
- Vera Ralston as Violet Barton
- John Carroll as Gregg Delaney
- Walter Brennan as Sheriff Bill Howard
- Francis Lederer as Henry Vaan
- William Ching as John Beauregard Hale
- Maria Palmer as Janet Barton
- Jane Darwell as Molly Hale
- Roy Barcroft as Deputy Gerard
- Paul Fix as Deputy Williams
- Esther Dale as Aunt May
- Edward Norris as Wilbur
- Howland Chamberlain as The Casino Manager
- Norman Budd as Carson
- Nacho Galindo as Gringo
- Jeff York as Canning
- Mickey Simpson as Pete
