= Thunderbirds (1952 film) =

1952 film by John H. Auer

- Original film poster
- Directed by: John H. Auer
- Screenplay by: Mary C. McCall Jr.
- Story by: Kenneth Gamet
- Produced by: John H. Auer
- Starring: John Derek; John Barrymore Jr. Mona Freeman; Gene Evans; Eileen Christy; Ward Bond; Barton MacLane
- Cinematography: Reggie Lanning
- Edited by: Richard L. Van Enger
- Music by: Victor Young
- Production company: Republic Pictures
- Distributed by: Republic Pictures
- Release dates: November 20, 1952 (Washington, D.C.); November 27, 1952 (United States); December 10, 1952 (San Francisco)
- Running time: 98 minutes
- Country: United States
- Language: English
- Box office: $1 million (US)

Thunderbirds is a 1952 war film directed by John H. Auer and starring John Derek, John Drew Barrymore, Mona Freeman, Gene Evans, Eileen Christy and Ward Bond. It features the exploits of the 45th Infantry Division in the Italian campaign of World War II. The film was made by Republic Pictures with sequences filmed at Fort Sill, Oklahoma.

== Plot ==
Close friends Gil Hackett and Tom McCreery both love and leave the same girl, Mary Caldwell, after they are called up to the Oklahoma National Guard and then on to the Army for wartime duty in 1940.

A tough, stoic sergeant named Logan keeps an eye on them as the unit ships out to North Africa following the Japanese attack on Pearl Harbor. Tom speaks of his father John, who supposedly died a hero's death in the First World War, but Keith Watson, another soldier, claims he's heard that Tom's father was disgraced and dishonorably discharged.

Mary reveals that Tom is the one she loves. Gil finds solace in meeting Lt. Ellen Henderson, an army nurse. The fighting continues in Sicily and when Tom ends up missing, Logan will not permit a search. Logan later heroically reports a movement of German tanks just before being shot.

With the invasion of Southern France at hand, it is learned that Logan had been court-martialed during World War I for authorizing a search party that led to the death of more soldiers. He reenlisted under a false name to prove himself again, particularly to Tom, who is actually his son.

== Cast ==
- John Derek as Lt. Gil Hacket
- John Barrymore Jr. as Pvt. Tom McCreery
- Mona Freeman as Lt. Ellen Henderson
- Gene Evans as Sgt. Mike Braggart
- Eileen Christy as Mary Caldwell
- Ward Bond as Lt. John McCreery (Sgt. Logan)
- Barton MacLane as Sgt. Durkee
- Wally Cassell as Pfc. Sam Jacobs
- Ben Cooper as Calvin Jones
- Robert Neil as Keith Watson
- Slim Pickens as Pvt. Wes Shelby
- Armando Silvestre as Cpl. Ralph Mogay
- Norman Budd as Pvt. Lou Radtke
- Mae Clarke as Mrs. Jones
- Sammy McKim as Cpl. Ray Hanford (as Sam McKim)
- Allene Roberts as Margie Hanford
- Richard Simmons as Capt. Norton
- Walter Reed as Lt. Hammond
- Suzanne Dalbert as Marie Etienne
- Barbara Pepper as Mrs. Louise Braggart
- Pepe Hern as Pvt. Jim Lastchance
- Victor Millan as Pvt. Joe Lastchance

== Reception ==
FilmInk wrote "This film set the template for many of Derek’s subsequent war movies: a story about two friends in love with the same girl who deal with a crusty old timer and lots of stock footage. It’s really dull."
