= David Brian =

American actor (1914–1993)

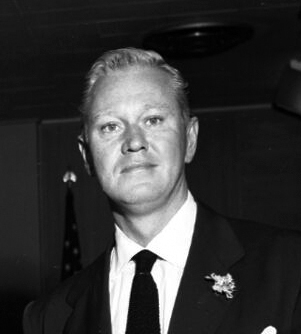
- Brian in 1951
- Born: Brian James Davis; August 5, 1914; New York City, U.S.
- Died: July 15, 1993 (aged 78); Sherman Oaks, Los Angeles, U.S.
- Education: City College of New York
- Occupation: Actor
- Years active: 1935–1974; 1983–1984
- Spouse(s): Bonita Fiedler (19??–1948; divorced) Lorna Gray (m. 1949)

Brian James Davis (August 5, 1914 – July 15, 1993), better known as David Brian, was an American actor. He is best known for his role in Intruder in the Dust (1949), for which he received critical acclaim and a Golden Globe nomination. Brian's other notable film roles were in The Damned Don't Cry (1950), This Woman Is Dangerous (1952), Springfield Rifle (1952), Dawn at Socorro (1954), and The High and the Mighty (1954).

On February 8, 1960, Brian was awarded a star on the Hollywood Walk of Fame at 7021 Hollywood Boulevard.

== Early years ==
Brian was born Brian Davis in New York City. After school at City College, he found work as a doorman, then entered show business with a song-and-dance routine in vaudeville and in night clubs. He did a wartime stint with the United States Coast Guard during World War II and returned to acting on the New York stage after the war.

== Film ==
Persuaded by Joan Crawford to try his hand at film acting, Brian joined her in Hollywood and, in 1949, signed a contract with Warner Bros. The New York City native appeared in such films as Flamingo Road (1949) and The Damned Don't Cry! (1950) with Joan Crawford, and Beyond the Forest (1949) with Bette Davis. He also had a role in the film Springfield Rifle (1952), which starred Gary Cooper, and in the John Wayne movie The High and the Mighty (1954) as Ken Childs.

Brian was nominated for a Golden Globe Award as Best Supporting Actor for his role in Intruder in the Dust (1949).

== Television ==
In the 1950s and 1960s, Brian was active in television with guest roles in dozens of shows ranging from dramatic to comedic, from Rawhide to I Dream of Jeannie. In 1954 and 1955, he portrayed the lead character on the TV show Mr. District Attorney, a role he originated on radio.

Brian has a star in the television section of the Hollywood Walk of Fame. It was dedicated on February 8, 1960.

== Personal life ==
Brian was married to Bonita Fiedler; they divorced in 1948. In 1950, she filed a paternity suit against him, seeking his support for a son born to her. The suit claimed that Brian had admitted to being the baby's father. Brian's attorney, on the other hand, said that Brian did not think he was the child's father. At the time of the suit, Brian was married to Adrian Booth, an actress known as Lorna Gray. On August 11, 1951, a jury found in Brian's favor after another man testified to having been intimate with the mother "several times during the year before the child was born".

Brian's marriage to Booth also had legal problems. In 1949, columnist Jimmie Fidler reported that Booth's "recent marriage to actor David Brian has been set aside by an L.A. judge because of illegalities in his divorce from a former mate".

== Death ==
Brian died July 15, 1993, of heart disease and cancer in Sherman Oaks, California.

== Filmography ==
=== Film ===
Year	Title	Role	Notes
1935	'G' Men	The Chief	1949 reissue scene; uncredited
1949	Flamingo Road	Dan Reynolds	
1949	Intruder in the Dust	John Gavin Stevens	
1949	Beyond the Forest	Neil Latimer	
1950	The Damned Don't Cry	George Castleman	
1950	The Great Jewel Robber	Gerard Graham Dennis	
1950	Breakthrough	Captain Tom Hale	
1951	Inside Straight	Rip MacCool	
1951	Inside the Walls of Folsom Prison	Mark Benson	
1951	Fort Worth	Blair Lunsford	
1952	This Woman is Dangerous	Matt Jackson	
1952	Springfield Rifle	Austin McCool	
1952	Million Dollar Mermaid	Alfred Harper	
1953	A Perilous Journey	Monty Breed	
1953	Ambush at Tomahawk Gap	Egan	
1954	The High and the Mighty	Ken Childs	
1954	Dawn at Socorro	Dick Braden	
1955	Timberjack	Croft Brunner	
1955	No Place to Hide	Dr. Dobson	
1956	Fury at Gunsight Pass	Whitey Turner	
1956	The First Traveling Saleslady	James Carter	
1956	Accused of Murder	Police Lt. Roy Hargis	
1956	The White Squaw	Sigrod Swanson	
1958	Ghost of the China Sea	Martin French	
1959	The Rabbit Trap	Everett Spellman	
1961	Pocketful of Miracles	Governor	
1962	How the West Was Won	Lilith's Attorney	
1966	The Rare Breed	Ellsworth	
1966	Castle of Evil	Robert Hawley	
1968	The Destructors	Hogan	
1969	Childish Things	Dad Jennings	
1969	The Girl Who Knew Too Much	Had Dixon	
1971	The Seven Minutes	Cardinal McManus	

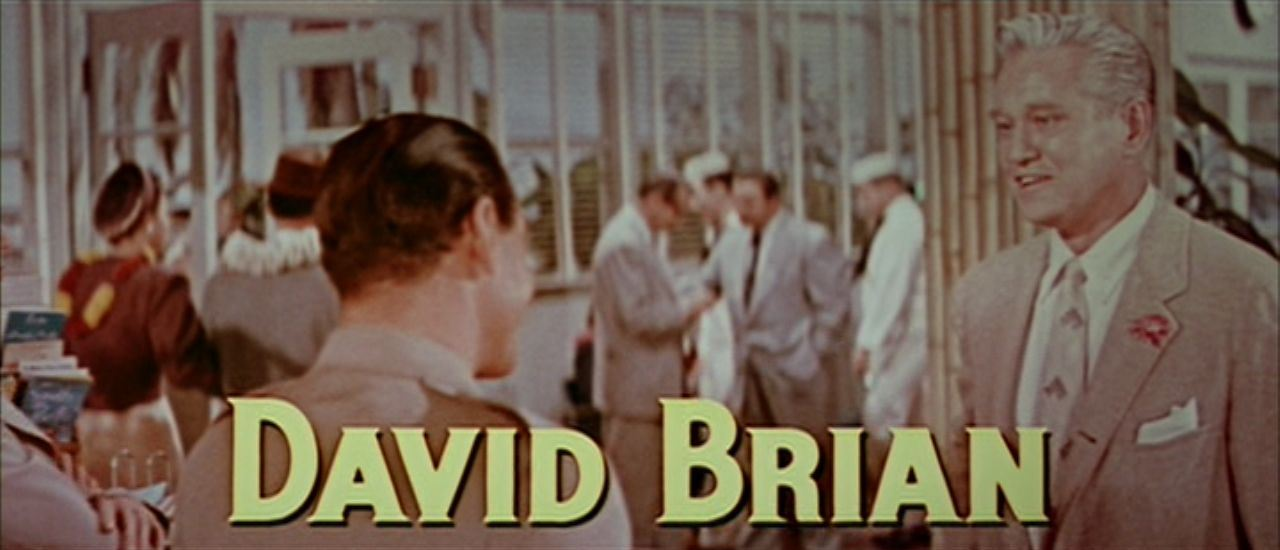
Brian in The High and the Mighty

=== Television ===
Year	Title	Role	Notes
1953	The Revlon Mirror Theater		Episode: "Flight from Home"
1953–1956	Schlitz Playhouse	Phil Derringer / Philip Gordon	3 episodes
1954	The Ford Television Theatre	Winnie Driscoll	Episode: "The Taming of the Shrewd"
1954	Your Play Time		Episode: "Flight from Home"
1954–1955	Mr. District Attorney	D.A. Paul Garrett	15 episodes
1954–1961	General Electric Theater	Frank Freeman / David	2 episodes
1956	Celebrity Playhouse		Episode: "The Twelve Year Secret"
1956–1957	Crossroads	Minister / Reverend Richard Farrell	3 episodes
1958	Target	Foster	Episode: "The Tattoo Artist"
1959	Alcoa Theatre	Bard Kanger	Episode: "Shadow of Evil"
1959	Rawhide	Jacob Calvin	
1960	Westinghouse Desilu Playhouse	Bleeck	Episode: "Murder Is a Private Affair"
1960–1961	The Untouchables	Brian O'Malley / Dink Conway	2 episodes
1961	Cain's Hundred	Frank Andreotis	Episode: "Degrees of Guilt"
1961	Rawhide	Thad Clemens	S3:E26, "Incident of the Painted Lady"
1962	Target: The Corruptors!	Chairman Tremaine	Episode: "One for the Road"
1963	Laramie	Walt Douglas	Episode: "Protective Custody"
1963	The Dakotas	Fargo	Episode: "Fargo"
1963	Death Valley Days	Jacob Hamblin	Episode: "The Peacemaker"
1964	Kraft Suspense Theatre	Mark Nelson	Episode: "Who Is Jennifer?"
1964	Daniel Boone	Major Horton	Episode: "The Choosing"
1965	Profiles in Courage	Charlton	Episode: "Judge Benjamin Barr Lindsey"
1965	Laredo	Theo Henderson	Episode: "Three's Company"
1965	I Dream of Jeannie	P.J. Ferguson	Episode: "The Yacht Murder Case"
1966	Honey West	Store Manager C.C. Rockwell	Episode: "The Perfect Un-crime"
1966	Branded	Gregory Hazin	3 episodes
1966	Please Don't Eat the Daisies	Roland Cunningham	Episode: "A-Hunting We Will Go"
1966	Iron Horse	Charlie Farrow	Episode: "No Wedding Bells for Tony"
1967	Love on a Rooftop	Willoughby	Episode: "Going Home to Daughter"
1967	The Girl from U.N.C.L.E.	Logan Petrie	Episode: "The High and the Deadly Affair"
1967	Hondo	Ben Dow	Episode: "Hondo and the Ghost of Ed Dow"
1968	Star Trek: The Original Series	John Gill	Episode: "Patterns of Force"
1968	Cimarron Strip	Turner	Episode: "The Greeners"
1968	Mannix	Clifton Ross Sr.	Episode: "Night Out of Time"
1968–1974	Gunsmoke	Tait Cavanaugh / Clay White / Branch Nelson	3 episodes
1969–1970	The Name of the Game	Chancellor Archer / Elton Wakefield	2 episodes
1970	The Immortal	Arthur Maitland	2 episodes
1971	O'Hara, U.S. Treasury	The Big Guy	Episode: "Operation: Spread"
1972	The Manhunter	Walter Sinclair	TV movie
1972	Mission: Impossible	Benjamin Dane	Episode: "Movie"
1972	Search	J.R. Devlin	Episode: "In Search of Midas"
1973	Hec Ramsey	Henry T. Madden	Episode: "Mystery of the Yellow Rose"
1973	Police Story	Borenson	Episode: "Death on Credit"
1975	Archer		Episode: "Shades of Blue"
1983–1984	Father's Day	Union Spokesman / Starter	2 episodes
