= Hit Parade of 1951 =

1950 film by John H. Auer

- Theatrical release poster
- Directed by: John H. Auer
- Screenplay by: Lawrence Kimble; Elizabeth Reinhardt; Aubrey Wisberg
- Story by: Aubrey Wisberg
- Produced by: John H. Auer
- Starring: John Carroll; Marie McDonald; Estelita Rodriguez; Frank Fontaine; Grant Withers; Mikhail Rasumny
- Cinematography: Reggie Lanning
- Edited by: Harry Keller
- Music by: R. Dale Butts
- Production company: Republic Pictures
- Distributed by: Republic Pictures
- Release date: October 15, 1950 (United States)
- Running time: 85 minutes
- Country: United States
- Language: English

Hit Parade of 1951 is a 1950 American musical film directed by John H. Auer and written by Lawrence Kimble, Elizabeth Reinhardt and Aubrey Wisberg. The film stars John Carroll, Marie McDonald, Estelita Rodriguez, Frank Fontaine, Grant Withers and Mikhail Rasumny. It was released on October 15, 1950 by Republic Pictures.

== Cast ==
- John Carroll as Joe Blake / Eddie Paul
- Marie McDonald as Michele
- Estelita Rodriguez as Chicquita
- Frank Fontaine as John L.O. 'Bingo' Sevony
- Grant Withers as Smokey
- Mikhail Rasumny as The Professor
- Michael St. Angel as Chuck
- Paul Cavanagh as Two-to-One Thompson
- Edward Gargan as Garrity
- Gus Schilling as Studio Guide
- Rose Rosett as Rose
- Wade Crosby as Jake
- Duke York as Cal
- Al Murphy as George
- Firehouse Five Plus Two as Themselves
- Bobby Ramos and His Rumba Band as Themselves
