= The Wild Blue Yonder (1951 film) =

1951 war film directed by Allan Dwan

- Original film poster
- Directed by: Allan Dwan
- Screenplay by: Richard Tregaskis
- Story by: Andrew Geer; Charles Grayson
- Produced by: John H. Auer
- Starring: Wendell Corey; Vera Ralston; Forrest Tucker; Phil Harris
- Narrated by: Wendell Corey
- Cinematography: Reggie Lanning
- Edited by: Richard L. Van Enger
- Music by: Victor Young
- Production company: Republic Pictures
- Distributed by: Republic Pictures
- Release dates: November 29, 1951 (Omaha, Nebraska); January 1, 1952 (New York)
- Running time: 98 minutes
- Country: United States
- Language: English
- Box office: $1 million (U.S. rentals)

The Wild Blue Yonder (also known as The Wild Blue Yonder, The Story of the B-29 Superfortress (Note: The opening title card reads The Wild Blue Yonder, The Story of the B-29 Superfortress.)) is a 1951 war film directed by Allan Dwan and starring Wendell Corey, Vera Ralston, Forrest Tucker and Phil Harris. The plot concerns the Boeing B-29 Superfortress air raids on Japan during World War II.

== Plot ==
In 1943, Capt. Harold "Cal" Calvert is learning to fly the Boeing B-29 Superfortress bomber. His instructor is his cousin Major Tom West. The other pilots believe that Tom has shirked his duties by claiming engine trouble on the raid over the Ploesti oil fields. Cal defends Tom when a crewman taunts his Tom in front of Helen, a nurse whom Tom has been seeing.

Cal and the other students learn that the pressurized B-29 can fly higher, faster and farther than any other bomber. On a test flight, when an Cal overconfidently pushes a B-29 higher than instructed, a sudden decompression nearly ends in tragedy. One of the crew members is sucked from the aircraft, but he is able to deploy his parachute. Tom is furious and reprimands Cal for endangering the test program, which the Air Force brass is monitoring closely.

Maj. Gen. Wolfe finally declares that the pilots and the B-29s are ready for combat. He leads them to bases in China, from where they will launch attacks on Japan. Cal's first missions are harrowing, although the B-29s prove to be extremely effective. When the group is transferred to Guam, Tom is reunited with Helen, who is also assigned there. Cal is flying continually on high-altitude missions, but new commanding officer Gen. Curtis E. LeMay changes tactics to more accurate low-altitude raids that will produce more damage.

Helen is slowly falling for the more heroic Cal, and when he and Tom are on a mission together in a mass raid on Tokyo, their B-29 is hit by antiaircraft fire. With Cal wounded and Tom at the controls, the stricken aircraft barely returns to the base. Tom returns to the fiery wreckage to save a trapped crewman but is killed when the aircraft explodes. Several weeks later, as the war ends after B-29s drop the atomic bomb on cities in Japan, Cal and Helen remain together.

== Cast ==
- Wendell Corey as Capt. Harold "Cal" Calvert
- Vera Ralston as Lt. Helen Landers
- Forrest Tucker as Maj. Tom West
- Phil Harris as Sgt. Hank Stack
- Walter Brennan as Maj. Gen. Wolfe
- William Ching as Lt. Ted Cranshaw
- Ruth Donnelly as Maj. Ida Winton
- Harry Carey Jr. as Sgt. Shaker Schuker
- Penny Edwards as Connie Hudson
- Wally Cassell as Sgt. Pulaski
- James Brown as Sgt. "Pop" Davis
- Richard Erdman as Cpl. Frenchy
- Phillip Pine as Sgt. Tony
- Martin Kilburn as "Peanuts"
- Jay Silverheels as Benders
- Jack Kelly as Lt. Jessup
- Hall Bartlett as Lt. Jorman
- William Witney as Gen. Curtis E. LeMay

== Production ==
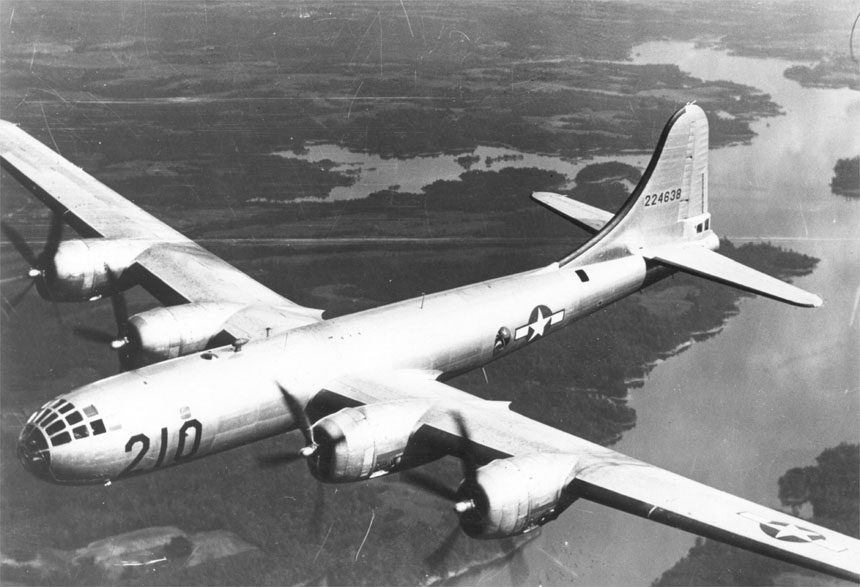
The B-29, the featured aircraft in The Wild Blue Yonder

The working title of the film was Wings Across the Pacific.

The production relied heavily on USAF and Marine Corps assistance. Location photography took place from April 3 to mid-May 1951 at March Field Air Base and Mojave Airport Marine Base in California, Davis-Monthan Field in Tucson, Arizona and Walker Air Force Base in Roswell, New Mexico, where the 22nd Bomb Group's 2nd Squadron was flying B-29s operationally. The aerial scenes of the bombing of Tokyo were filmed above Santa Catalina Island.

== Release ==
The film premiered at the Orpheum Theatre in Omaha, Nebraska on November 29, 1951 and grossed $17,000 in its opening week in a double bill with The Sea Hornet.

The film was rereleased in 1958.

== Reception ==
In a contemporary review for The New York Times, critic Bosley Crowther wrote: "[T]his soggy saga of bomber airmen in World War II plows monotonously through every cliché of aerial war films before it hits the mud and then it bogs down in the bathos of mawkish heroics and tears. ... Except for a few aerial glimpses and newsreel shots lifted out of the files, 'The Wild Blue Yonder' is strictly artificial, illogical, pedestrian and dull."

== Adaptation ==
On September 24, 1951, on a special Lux Radio Theatre broadcast honoring the 50th anniversary of motion pictures, Corey, Ralston and Tucker recreated brief scenes from The Wild Blue Yonder.
