= John H. Auer =

Hungarian-born film director (1906–1975)

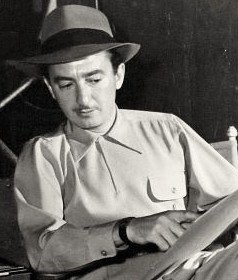
- Born: August 3, 1906; Budapest, Austro-Hungarian Empire
- Died: March 15, 1975 (aged 68); North Hollywood, Los Angeles
- Years active: 1935–1960

John H. Auer (August 3, 1906 – March 15, 1975) was a Hungarian-born film director and producer. His most successful films include The Crime of Dr. Crespi (1935), Rhythm of the Clouds (1937), The Man Who Was Betrayed (1941), Gangway to Tomorrow (1943), The Flame (1947 film), I, Jane Doe (1948), City That Never Sleeps (1953), Hell's Half Acre (1954 film), The Eternal Sea (1955), and Johnny Trouble (1957).

== Career ==
Auer was born in Budapest on August 3, 1906. he was a child actor in Vienna from the age of 12. After he grew up, he had some business experience in Europe, but decided to emigrate to the United States in 1928. He first sought work as a director in Hollywood but luck did not seem to favour him. Next, he tried his hand at directing some Mexican films, which did quite well as they not only brought him critical acclaim but also fared well in box office receipts; some even brought him awards from the Mexican government.

His success in Mexico helped Auer to make a re-entry into Hollywood and direct films. Although he worked mostly for the Republic Pictures who specialized in Westerns and B films, he stuck to crime thrillers and musicals. Besides directing, he also produced most of his directed films.

The year 1934 saw Auer's Hollywood directorial venture, Frankie and Johnny, filmed at the Mascot Studios. His later years were spent mostly with the Republic Pictures. It was in the late 1940s and early 1950s when some of his B-rated movies such as Angel on the Amazon, Thunderbirds, and Hell's Half Acre were well accepted by the film lovers. He also did a film with RKO Pictures's Gangway for Tomorrow and Universal Studios's Johnny Doughboy.

In 1936–1937, Auer staged the crime comedy The Man Who Was Betrayed (1936), two musical comedies, Rhythm of the Clouds (1937) and Manhattan Carousel (1937), and the crime action film The Girl from the Circus (1937), which went virtually unnoticed.

In 1938, Auer directed five low-profile films, including the adventure comedy Desperate Adventure (1938) with Ramon Navarro and the crime melodramas The Invisible Enemy (1938) with Alan Marshall, and I Am the Accused (1938) with Robert Cummings. The following year, Auer released five more B-rated movies, the most notable of which were the political crime melodrama S.O.S. Storm Tide (1939), the drama about illegal immigrants Contraband Cargo (1939), and the crime comedy with Paul Kelly, The Fake Passport (1939).

After the war melodrama Women in War (1940) and the musical comedy Hit Parade 1941 (1940), Auer directed the crime comedy The Man Who Was Betrayed (1941) in 1941. In this film, John Wayne plays a lawyer who undertakes to prove the connection between a prominent politician and corruption, despite the fact that he is about to marry his daughter (Frances Dee). As Thomas Pryor wrote about the film in The New York Times, "if there were less talk and more action, the film would be more than just a sluggish exposé of a corrupt political boss".

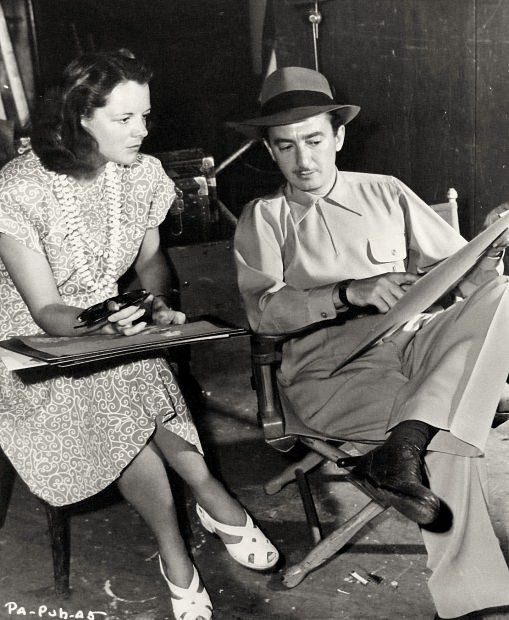
Costume designer Renié and John H. Auer on the set of Pan-Americana (1945)

After the adventure comedy Johnny Trooper (1943), Auer directed several forgettable films, and a year later, at RKO Pictures, he directed the propaganda melodrama Bridge to Tomorrow (1943), which tells the story of five people, each of whom experiences wartime in their own way. The film starred famous actors such as Margo, John Carradine, and Robert Ryan. In 1944–1945, Auer worked mainly in the musical comedy genre, directing the films Seven Days in Heaven (1944), Music in Manhattan (1944), and Pan-Americana (1945).

After another musical, Very Cool (1947), Auer directed his first film noir, The Flame (1947 film). The film tells the story of George McCallister (John Carroll), who persuades his girlfriend, nurse Charlotte Duval (Vera Ralston), to marry his wealthy, terminally ill brother Barry (Robert Page), hoping to inherit his fortune. However, Charlotte falls truly in love with Barry and does everything she can to help him recover. Meanwhile, a blackmailer (Broderick Crawford) stands in the way of their happiness, extorting money from George and threatening to expose his relationship with Charlotte. After the film's release, New York Times film critic Howard Thompson gave it a low rating, writing that "the only distinguishing feature of this incoherent, clumsy nonsense is the sadly amusing fact that most of the actors seem to be either bored or amused by it all. And that's not surprising, because the film has a gloomy, simplistic plot about ‘which brother do I love’, which is built around Vera Ralston."

On the other hand, contemporary film critic Hal Erickson noted that "both in terms of budget and drama, this is one of the richest films produced by Republic Pictures in the late 1940s" and, according to Michael Keaney, it is "a decent drama with a lot of atmosphere, including organ music and ocean waves crashing against the rocks, as well as a couple of murders."

In 1948, Auer released the war melodrama I, Jane Doe (1948) starring Ruth Hussey and the adventure melodrama Angel of the Amazon (1948) starring George Brent and Vera Ralston. After the adventure melodrama The Avengers (1949) with John Carroll and Adele Mara and the war melodrama Far Blue Sky (1951) starring Wendell Corey, Vera Ralston, and Forrest Tucker, the director made a military action drama about American pilots on the Italian front during World War II, The Stormbirds (1952). The film starred actors such as John Derek, John Drew Barrymore, and Mona Freeman.

Auer retired from filmmaking after 1960 and died on March 15, 1975, in North Hollywood, Los Angeles.

== Filmography ==
Selected Filmography
Title	Year	Role	Notes
U.S. Marshals	1959-1960	Producer	10 episodes
Westinghouse Desilu Playhouse	1959	Producer	1 Episode "Ballad for a Bad Man"
Whirlybirds	1957-1960	Producer	35 episodes
Johnny Trouble	1957	Producer & Director	
Sheriff of Cochise	1957	Producer	1 Episode "Apache Kid"
The Eternal Sea	1955	Associate Producer	
Hell's Half Acre	1954	Director & Producer	
City That Never Sleeps	1953	Director & Producer	
Thunderbirds	1952	Producer	
The Wild Blue Yonder	1951	Producer	
Hit Parade of 1951	1950	Producer	
The Avengers	1950	Producer	
Angel on the Amazon	1948	Director & Producer	
I, Jane Doe	1948	Director & Producer	
The Flame	1947	Director & Producer	
Beat the Band	1947	Director	
Pan-Americana	1945	Director & Producer	
Music in Manhattan	1944	Director & Producer	
Seven Days Ashore	1944	Director & Producer	
Gangway for Tomorrow	1943	Director & Producer	
Tahiti Honey	1943	Director & Producer	
Johnny Doughboy	1942	Director & Producer	
Moonlight Masquerade	1942	Producer & Director	
The Devil Pays Off	1941	Director	
A Man Betrayed	1941	Director	
Women in War	1940	Director	
Hit Parade of 1941	1940	Director	
Smuggled Cargo	1939	Producer & Director	
Thou Shalt Not Kill	1939	Director	
Calling All Marines	1939	Director	
S.O.S. Tidal Wave	1939	Director	
Forged Passport	1939	Director & Producer	
Outside of Paradise	1938	Director	
Orphans of the Street	1938	Director	
I Stand Accused	1938	Director & Producer	
A Desperate Adventure	1938	Director & Producer	
Invisible Enemy	1938	Director & Producer	
Rhythm in the Clouds	1937	Director	
Under Strange Flags	1937	Story	
A Man Betrayed	1936	Director	
The Crime of Dr. Crespi	1935	Director & Producer	
