= Nathan Scott (composer) =

American composer

Nathan Scott (May 11, 1915 – February 27, 2010) was an American film score and television composer. He composed, conducted, arranged and orchestrated more than 850 separate credits in television, as well as the music for more than 100 films. His credits in television included Lassie, The Twilight Zone and Dragnet, while his film credits included the film score for Wake of the Red Witch.

== Biography ==
=== Early life ===
Scott was born in Salinas, California. He received a bachelor's degree in music from the University of California, Berkeley in 1939. He began working in radio broadcasting after graduation.

=== Career ===
Scott was named the West Coast music director for Blue Network, which was owned by NBC, in 1942. However, he was soon drafted into the United States Army during World War II, where he wrote music and played the trombone for the Air Transport Command Band, based in Long Beach, California. He later conducted shows on the Armed Forces Radio Service such as Command Performance.

Following the end of World War II, Scott was hired by Republic Pictures as a staff composer for six years, beginning in 1946. He composed, conducted or orchestrated "dozens" of film scores for Republic Pictures, including Heart of the Rockies and Wake of the Red Witch, starring John Wayne. Though much of his career would focus on scoring for television, his later film credits at other film studios included MGM's 1961 X-15 and Montana Belle, which was released by RKO Pictures in 1953.

Scott left Republic Pictures in 1952. Beginning in the early 1950s, Scott spent most of his career composing for television. Starting in 1952, Scott orchestrated and arranged music for Dragnet's original composer, Walter Schumann. Scott did the arrangements for all Dragnet episodes, until the show's series finale in 1959. Scott also composed the score for approximately six Dragnet episodes.

Scott wrote the theme music for the 1964 dramatic series, Slattery's People, which aired during the 1964-1965 television season. He also worked on the Twilight Zone for two episodes, scoring the music for A Stop at Willoughby in 1960.

In 1963, Scott began working on the classic television series, Lassie. He scored virtually all the episodes of Lassie (except for 4) until the show ended its run in 1974. His 1950s and 1960s television credits included episodes of My Three Sons, Steve Canyon, The Untouchables, Rawhide and Wagon Train.

Scott orchestrated for a number of other prominent television and film composers beginning in the 1970s, including Quincy Jones on The Color Purple, his son Tom Scott in Hanky Panky and Stu Phillips for The Fall Guy and Battlestar Galactica.

Nathan Scott died of natural causes at his home in Sherman Oaks, California, on February 27, 2010, at the age of 94. He was survived by his son, Grammy-winning saxophonist Tom Scott; his second wife, Frances McCune Scott; his daughter, Linda Colley; his brother and two grandchildren. His first wife, Margery, died in 1995.

== Selected filmography ==
- Wyoming (1947)
- Angel on the Amazon (1948)
- Wake of the Red Witch (1948)
- Train to Alcatraz (1948)
- The Red Menace (1949)
- The Kid from Cleveland (1949)
- The Golden Stallion (1949)
- Singing Guns (1950)
- California Passage (1950)
- The Avengers (1950)
- Lady Possessed (1952)
- Montana Belle (1952)
- Hoodlum Empire (1952)
- Oklahoma Annie (1952)
