= John Carroll (actor) =

American actor (1906–1979)

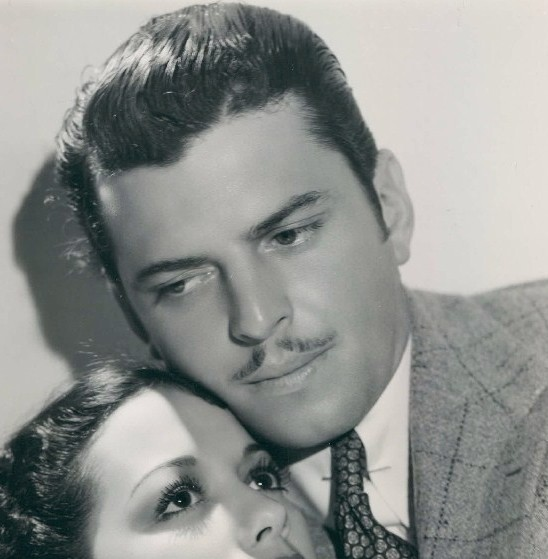
- Carroll in Wolf Call (1939)
- Born: Julian Joseph LaFaye, Jr. July 17, 1906; New Orleans, Louisiana, U.S.
- Died: April 24, 1979 (aged 72); Hollywood, California, U.S.
- Resting place: Forest Lawn Memorial Park, Hollywood Hills, California
- Occupation: Actor
- Years active: 1929–1974
- Spouses: Steffi Duna (m. 1935; div. 1936) Garnett Lucille Ryman (m. 1947)
- Children: 1

John Carroll (born Julian Joseph LaFaye, Jr.; July 17, 1906 – April 24, 1979) was an American actor.

== Career ==
Carroll was born in New Orleans, Louisiana. He performed in several small roles in films under his birth name until 1935, when he first used the name John Carroll in Hi, Gaucho!. He appeared in several Western films in the 1930s, including the role of Zorro in Zorro Rides Again in 1937. He was the male lead in the Marx Brothers' Western comedy Go West in 1940. Probably his best known role was as Woody Jason in the 1942 movie Flying Tigers with John Wayne. He was also notable as a Cajun soldier, aptly nicknamed Wolf, in the 1945 comedy A Letter for Evie.

He interrupted his movie career during World War II and to serve as a U.S. Army Air Corps pilot in North Africa. He broke his back in a crash. He recovered and resumed his acting career.

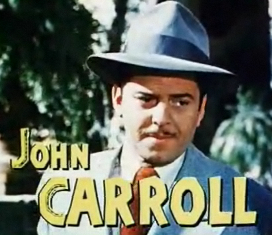
from the trailer for Fiesta (1947)

John Carroll was a well-established actor and his wife Lucille was a casting director at Metro-Goldwyn-Mayer (MGM). In 1948, the fledgling movie actress Marilyn Monroe moved into their house. They helped support her emotionally and financially during her difficult transition period. Their support was essential in her success as an actress.

Carroll worked steadily through the mid-1950s, but his career began to fade in the latter half of the decade. He did play a memorable role in the 1957 Budd Boetticher western Decision at Sundown as Tate Kimbrough, the evil nemesis of Randolph Scott's character. His last roles were in Ride in a Pink Car in 1974 and in Orson Welles' The Other Side of the Wind, released in 2018, that he joined in 1975.

== Personal life ==
Carroll was married twice; first to Steffi Duna (the couple had a daughter, Julianna Benito), and then to Lucille Ryman (until his death).

Carroll died of leukemia at the age of 72 in Hollywood, California. He was buried in Forest Lawn Memorial Park, Hollywood Hills, California.

== Partial filmography ==
- Marianne (1929) - Doughboy (uncredited)
- Devil-May-Care (1929) - Bonapartist (uncredited)
- The Rogue Song (1930) - Bandit (uncredited)
- Monte Carlo (1930) - Wedding Guest Officer (uncredited)
- Doughboys (1930) - Doughboy in Elmer's Squad (uncredited)
- New Moon (1930) - Russian Soldier on Ship (uncredited)
- Hi, Gaucho! (1935) - Lucio Bolario
- Muss 'em Up (1936) - Gene Leland
- Murder on a Bridle Path (1936) - Latigo Wells
- The Accusing Finger (1936) - Dominic (uncredited)
- Death in the Air (1936) - Jerry Blackwood
- We Who Are About to Die (1937) - Joe Donahue
- Zorro Rides Again (1937, Serial) - James Vega
- Rose of the Rio Grande (1938) - El Gato
- Swingtime in the Movies (1938) - Rick Arden (short film)
- I Am a Criminal (1938) - Brad McArthur
- Only Angels Have Wings (1939) - Gent Shelton
- Wolf Call (1939) - Michael 'Mike' Vance
- Congo Maisie (1940) - Dr. Michael Shane
- Susan and God (1940) - Clyde
- Phantom Raiders (1940) - John Ramsell, Jr
- Hired Wife (1940) - Jose de Briganza
- Go West (1940) - Terry Turner
- Sunny (1941) - Larry Warren
- This Woman is Mine (1941) - Ovide de Montigny
- Lady Be Good (1941) - Buddy Crawford
- Rio Rita (1942) - Ricardo Montera
- Pierre of the Plains (1942) - Pierre
- Flying Tigers (1942) - Woody Jason
- The Youngest Profession (1943) - Dr. Hercules
- Hit Parade of 1943 (1943) - Rick Farrell
- Bedside Manner (1945) - Morgan Hale
- A Letter for Evie (1946) - Edgar 'Wolf' Larson
- Fiesta (1947) - Jose 'Pepe' Ortega
- Wyoming (1947) - Glenn Forrester
- The Fabulous Texan (1947) - John Wesley Baker
- The Flame (1947) - George MacAllister
- Old Los Angeles (1948) - Johnny Morrell
- I, Jane Doe (1948) - Stephen Curtis
- Angel in Exile (1948) - Charlie Dakin
- The Avengers (1950) - Don Careless / Francisco Suarez
- Surrender (1950) - Gregg Delaney
- Hit Parade of 1951 (1950) - Joe Blake / Eddie Paul
- Belle Le Grand (1951) - John Kilton
- The Farmer Takes a Wife (1953) - Jotham Klore
- Geraldine (1953) - Grant Sanborn
- Reluctant Bride (1955) - Jeff Longstreet
- Decision at Sundown (1957) - Tate Kimbrough
- Plunderers of Painted Flats (1959) - Clint Jones
- Ride in a Pink Car (1974) - Mr. Henry
- The Other Side of the Wind (2018) - Lou Martin (final film role)
