= Dakota (1945 film) =

1945 film

- Theatrical poster to Dakota (1945)
- Directed by: Joseph Kane
- Screenplay by: Howard Estabrook; Lawrence Hazard
- Story by: Carl Foreman
- Produced by: Joseph Kane
- Starring: John Wayne; Vera Hruba Ralston; Walter Brennan; Ward Bond; Ona Munson; Hugo Haas
- Cinematography: Jack A. Marta
- Edited by: Fred Allen
- Music by: Walter Scharf
- Production company: Republic Pictures
- Distributed by: Republic Pictures
- Release date: December 25, 1945
- Running time: 82 minutes
- Country: United States
- Language: English
- Budget: $843,545
- Box office: $1,448,688 (as at 27 March 1953)

Dakota is a 1945 American Western film directed by Joseph Kane, and starring John Wayne. The supporting cast features Walter Brennan, Ward Bond, and Mike Mazurki.

== Plot ==
The action is set in 1875. Wayne stars as John Devlin (John Wayne), a professional gambler who has married Sandra (Vera Ralston), daughter of railroad millionaire Marko Poli (Hugo Haas). John and Sandra flee her father's anger and go to Fargo in Dakota Territory, where Sandra thinks they can cash in on a land boom. But on the trip west, they are swindled out of their stake ($20,000 Sandra swiped from her father). In a desperate attempt to get back their money, Devlin enters into a heated range battle against the outlaws led by Bender.

Bender steals their money & uses it to attempt to buy the properties of the landowners in Fargo, Dakota. Devlin tries to prevent it but cannot. So he offers to buy the land contracts with the threat that he can ask Sandi's father to pass through another town which will mean Bender's purchase will be useless.

Right as Bender hands the lands over to Devlin an agent of Mr. Poli arrives with a secret intent to buy the lands. Bender finds out & Devlin runs away with the contract giving it to one of the settlers. As soon as Devlin leaves the house Bender's men enter & take away the contract & murder the settler.

When Devlin returns to town he is greeted by Bender who attempts to frame & hang him. Right then a group of settlers arrive on horseback with the lands of the settlers burning in the background.

Devlin goes looking for Bender & his second in command. As Bender is packing to skip town the second in command kills him & steals his money.

Devlin tackles the second in command & as they are about to leave for California Sandy (Devlin's wife) tells him that she gave the money she had to the boat captain to help him buy a new boat (since he ran aground the other boat when carrying them to Fargo).

== Cast ==
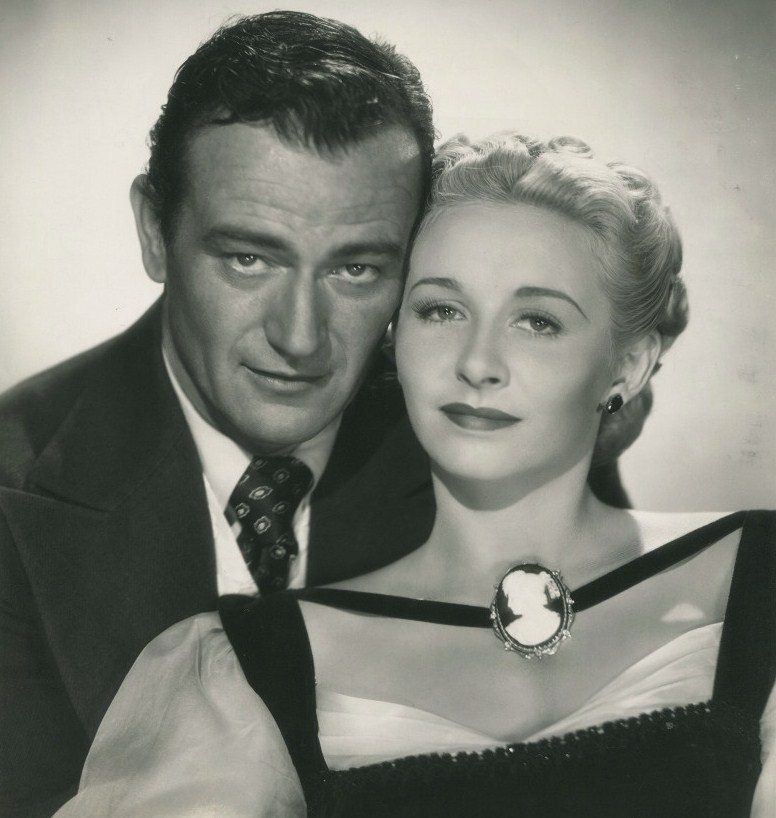
John Wayne and Vera Ralston in Dakota

- John Wayne as John Devlin
- Vera Hruba Ralston as Sandy Poli (Devlin)
- Walter Brennan as Capt. Bounce of the Riverbird
- Ward Bond as Jim Bender
- Mike Mazurki as Bigtree Collins
- Ona Munson as Jersey Thomas
- Olive Blakeney as Mrs. Stowe
- Hugo Haas as Marko Poli
- Nick Stewart as Nicodemus (as Nicodemus Stewart)
- Paul Fix as Carp
- Grant Withers as Slagin
- Robert Livingston as Lieutenant
- Olin Howland as Devlin's driver (as Olin Howlin)
- Pierre Watkin as Wexton Geary
- Robert Barrat as Anson Stowe (as Robert H. Barrat)
- Jonathan Hale as Col. Wordin
- Robert Blake as Little Boy (as Bobby Blake)
- Paul Hurst as Captain Spotts
- Eddy Waller as Stagecoach Driver
- Sarah Padden as Mrs. Plummer
- Jack La Rue as Suade
- George Cleveland as Mr. Plummer
- Selmer Jackson as Dr. Judson
- Claire Du Brey as Wahtonka
- Roy Barcroft as Poli's Driver

== See also ==
- List of American films of 1945
- John Wayne filmography
