= Lawrence Kimble =

American screenwriter

- Born: Lawrence Edwin Kimble; September 21, 1904; Bakersfield, California, United States
- Died: September 3, 1977 (age 72); Los Angeles, California, United States
- Occupation: Writer
- Years active: 1936-1963 (film & TV)

Lawrence Edwin Kimble (September 21, 1904 – September 3, 1977) was an American screenwriter.

== Early life and career ==
On September 21, 1904, Kimble was born in Bakersfield, California, one of five children born to Sarah Elizabeth Stanley and Arthur William Kimble. Beginning in 1924, Kimble worked for several years as a reporter with The Bakersfield Californian before making his screenwriting debut in 1936 with All American Chump. He was a charter member of the Screen Writers Guild.

== Personal life ==
On June 1, 1935, Kimble married Marjorie Hedrick.

== Death ==
On September 3, 1977, Kimble died of a heart attack at Valley Presbyterian Hospital.

== Selected filmography ==
- The Country Bumpkin (1936)
- Submarine D-1 (1937)
- Love, Honor and Behave (1938)
- The Adventures of Jane Arden (1939)
- It All Came True (1940)
- The Devil Pays Off (1941)
- Pardon My Stripes (1942)
- Pierre of the Plains (1942)
- Bells of Capistrano (1942)
- The Bugle Sounds (1942)
- Moonlight Masquerade (1942)
- Tahiti Honey (1943)
- Music in Manhattan (1944)
- Seven Days Ashore (1944)
- Pan-Americana (1945)
- The Bamboo Blonde (1946)
- Beat the Band (1947)
- Angel on the Amazon (1948)
- Mystery in Mexico (1948)
- Hit Parade of 1951 (1950)

== Bibliography ==
- Len D. Martin. The Republic Pictures Checklist: Features, Serials, Cartoons, Short Subjects and Training Films of Republic Pictures Corporation, 1935-1959. McFarland, 1998.
