= Herbert J. Yates =

American film studio executive (1880–1966)

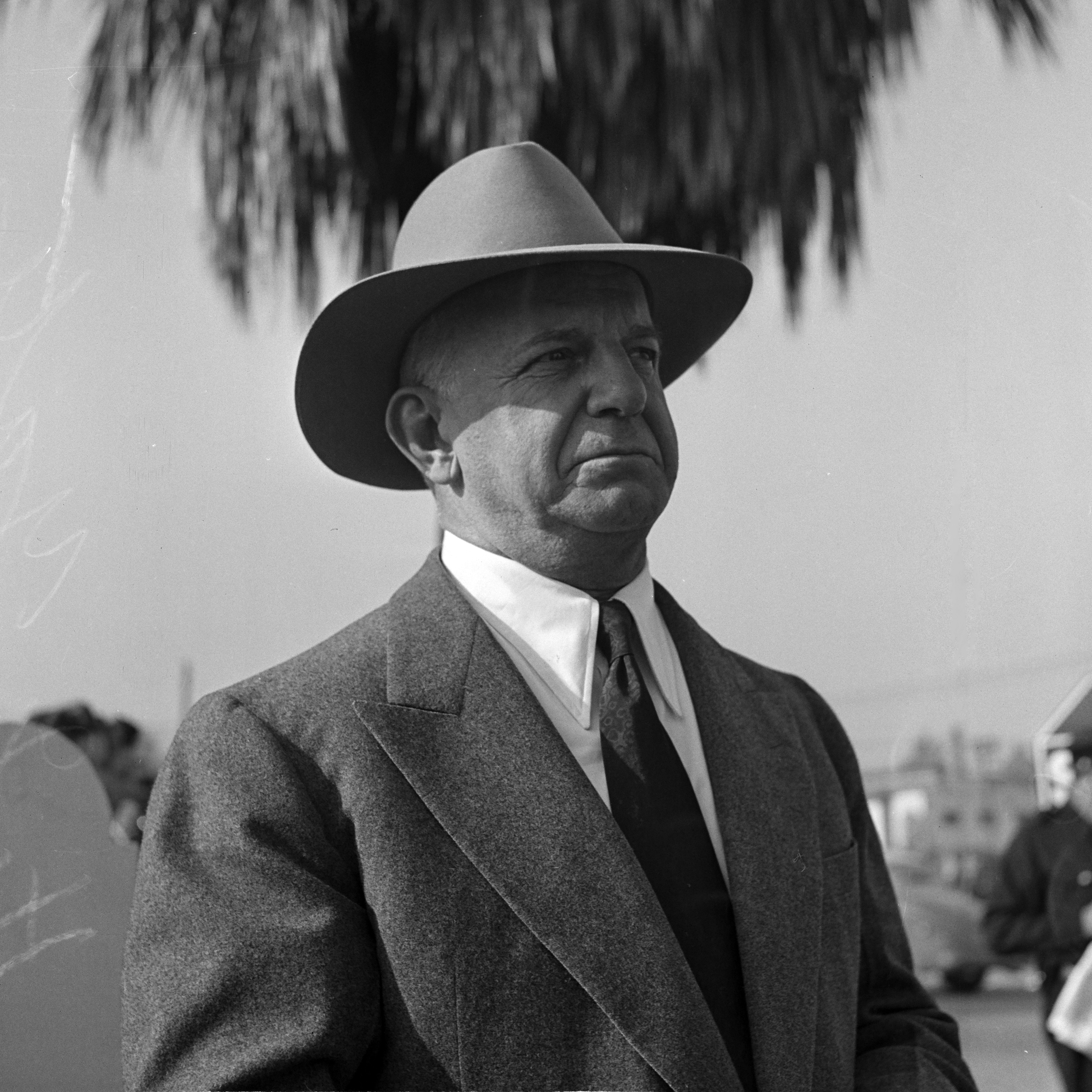
- Yates, c. 1940s
- Born: Herbert John Yates; August 24, 1880; Brooklyn, New York, U.S.
- Died: February 3, 1966 (aged 85); Sherman Oaks, California, U.S.
- Occupations: Studio executive; film producer
- Known for: Republic Pictures
- Notable work: American Tobacco Company

Herbert John Yates (August 24, 1880 – February 3, 1966), a Hollywood mini-mogul, was the founder and President of Republic Pictures. With his contract, he had launched the film careers of such Western stars as Roy Rogers, Gene Autry, and John Wayne. Between 1935 and 1959, under the supervising leadership of Yates, Republic produced 956 feature films and 66 multi-chapter cliffhanger serials, some of which are today considered classics. They were later broadcast on television and then released on home video.

== Early life ==
Yates was born in Brooklyn, New York, on August 24, 1880 to Charles Henry Yates and Emma Yates (née Worthington). He started his business career at an early age, building a newspaper sales business on the streets of Brooklyn. Later, he ascended from office boy to eastern regional sales manager of the American Tobacco Company, retiring from that company with a sizable fortune before the age of 30.

== Career ==
Focusing on the movie and recording business, he built a small empire, acquiring record companies and film laboratories. In the 1920s he provided financing for Mack Sennett and Fatty Arbuckle.

In October 1929 his Consolidated Film Industries took control of ARC, the American Record Corporation, a company created as a result of a merger between a number of small dime store record labels. In the following years, the company was heavily involved in a depressed market for phonograph records, buying up failing labels at bargain prices to exploit their catalogues. In December 1931 Warner Bros. leased Brunswick Records, Vocalion Records, and associated companies to ARC.

By 1932 ARC was king of the 3-records-for-a-dollar market, selling 6 million units, twice as much as competitor RCA Victor. In an effort to get back on top RCA launched the low-priced Bluebird Records label. ARC bought out the Columbia Records catalogue in 1934. During the 1930s, ARC produced the Brunswick and Columbia labels at 75¢ each and the Oriole (for McCrory), Romeo (for Kress), Melotone, Vocalion, Banner, Conqueror (for Sears), and Perfect labels at 35¢ each, or 3 records for $1.00.

In December 1938 the entire ARC complex was purchased from Consolidated Film for $700,000 by the Columbia Broadcasting System (CBS). After CBS brought back Columbia as their flagship label, they brought back the inactive OKeh Records label to replace Vocalion, which allowed the rights to the Brunswick and Vocalion labels to return to Warner Bros. They sold the rights to those labels to Decca Records in the early 1940s. In a complicated move, CBS managed to keep the rights to the ARC material from 1931 through 1938.

Yates formed Republic Pictures in 1935 by arranging for the merger of several smaller production companies with his Consolidated Film Industries, which was providing film processing and financing for many Hollywood studios. Among the merged companies were Mascot Pictures, which brought the serial to Republic, and also purchased the Mack Sennett lot in Studio City and Monogram Pictures. Under Yates' leadership, Republic first leased, and then purchased the lot, expanding it from six stages to nineteen and adding state-of-the-art production facilities.

In 1934 Gene Autry had his first film role in the Mascot production of In Old Santa Fe. Autry had been a recording artist under contract to Yates' American Record Corporation. He would go on to star in 56 feature films for Republic between 1935 and 1947. In 1938 Yates created a second American icon by giving Roy Rogers his first starring role in Under Western Stars. Rogers filled in for Autry during World War II and ended up making more than 80 films under the Republic banner.

Republic's most acclaimed feature film was The Quiet Man (1952), directed by John Ford, and starring John Wayne and Maureen O'Hara.Ford had tried to make the Irish love story for years, but none of the studio heads would take a chance on it. Yates risked a budget of more than a million dollars, making possible the use of Technicolor (in lieu of Republic's own Trucolor process) and location filming in Ireland. It earned triple its cost and earned Republic its only Academy Award nomination for Best Picture. Johnny Guitar (1954), directed by Nicholas Ray and starring Joan Crawford, became another well regarded Republic picture.

== Personal life and death ==
Yates had 3 children, a daughter and 2 sons.

In 1948 Yates left his wife Petra for former actress and Czech ice-skating star Vera Hruba Ralston, with the couple marrying in 1952. He employed Vera's brother Rudy Ralston as a producer at Republic.

In 1958 Yates was accused of exploiting Republic for his own gain, in particular his promotion of his wife's career. It was alleged that 18 of her 20 films had been flops.

Yates and Vera's relatives were pushed out of Republic and the film business in 1959, the same year Republic's board decided to switch emphasis from production to distribution, selling their controlling interest to Victor M. Carter for nearly $6 million. Yates became chairman of the board.

Yates died at his residence in Sherman Oaks in 1966.

== Death and legacy ==
The Republic lot survives today as CBS Studio Center. Notable among Yates' contributions to the lot are the Mabel Normand sound stage, built during World War II and later home to The Mary Tyler Moore Show, and an award-winning music scoring auditorium that has hosted such famous names as Aaron Copland and Artur Rubinstein.
