= The Vampire's Ghost =

1945 film by Lesley Selander

- Theatrical release poster
- Directed by: Lesley Selander
- Screenplay by: John K. Butler; Leigh Brackett
- Story by: Leigh Brackett
- Produced by: Rudolph E. Abel
- Starring: John Abbott; Charles Gordon; Peggy Stewart; Grant Withers; Emmett Vogan; Adele Mara
- Cinematography: Robert Pittack; Bud Thackery
- Edited by: Tony Martinelli
- Production company: Republic Pictures
- Distributed by: Republic Pictures
- Release date: May 21, 1945
- Running time: 59 minutes
- Country: United States
- Language: English

The Vampire's Ghost is a 1945 American horror film directed by Lesley Selander, written by Leigh Brackett and John K. Butler, and starring John Abbott, Charles Gordon, Peggy Stewart, Grant Withers, Emmett Vogan and Adele Mara. The film was released on May 21, 1945, by Republic Pictures.

== Plot ==
Roy Hendrick (Charles Gordon) returns to the village of Bakunda after a short absence to find that there has been a series of strange murders where each victim was bitten on the neck and drained of blood. The local Natives are certain it is the work of a vampire, but Roy, his girlfriend Julie Vance (Peggy Stewart) and her father Thomas Vance (Emmett Vogan) who runs a local plantation do not believe in such superstitious nonsense.

They go to see Webb Fallon (John Abbott), a newcomer to the area who runs a nightclub and knows a lot about the occult and the local voodoo customs. It is soon apparent that Fallon is indeed a vampire. A native stabs him with a silver tipped spear, and at this point Fallon tells Roy the truth about himself, making Roy his slave with the curse of the undead. Roy must do his bidding and can not tell anyone the truth about Fallon.

Fallon kills Lisa (Adele Mara), a dancer in his club and a troublesome sea Captain named Barrett (Roy Barcroft). Hendrick is helpless to stop him until the local Priest gives him the strength to conquer Fallon's hold on him. Fallon, realizing that everyone is on to him now, takes Julie to a nearby Temple of Death where he plans to make her his eternal vampire bride. The heroes race to Temple, stop Fallon in the nick of time and burn the vampire's body in the temple.

== Cast ==
- John Abbott as Webb Fallon
- Charles Gordon as Roy Hendrick
- Peggy Stewart as Julie Vance
- Grant Withers as Father Gilchrist
- Emmett Vogan as Thomas Vance
- Adele Mara as Lisa
- Roy Barcroft as Capt. Jim Barrett
- Martin Wilkins as Simon Peter
- Frank Jaquet as The Doctor
- Jimmy Aubrey as The Bum
- Louise Franklin as Caba

== Production ==
The film was an early screen credit for Leigh Brackett. Her former agent, Hugh King, had gone to work at Republic as a story editor and got Brackett a job on it as writer. Brackett later recalled, "they were doing this horror film. They decided to cash in on the Universal monster school, and I had been doing science fiction, and to them it all looked the same — "bug-eyed monsters." It made no difference." Shortly afterwards Brackett was hired by Howard Hawks to write The Big Sleep.

Filming started in October 1944.

Brackett later said she worked three weeks on the script with another writer. "They shot the film in ten days and that was two days over schedule (laughing). They fired the cameraman after the second day because he was taking too much time. But uh, it was not the greatest film ever made."

== Reception ==
The success of this and The Phantom Speaks encouraged Republic to make another two horror films, Valley of the Zombies and The Catman of Paris.
