= Gano Chittenden =

American art director

- Born: August 4, 1897; New York City, US
- Died: March 9, 1980 (aged 82); Burbank, California, US
- Occupation: Art director
- Years active: 1944-1948 (film)

Gano Chittenden (1897–1980) was an American art director.

== Selected filmography ==
- Call of the South Seas (1944)
- Marshal of Reno (1944)
- Secrets of Scotland Yard (1944)
- Stagecoach to Monterey (1944)
- The Girl Who Dared (1944)
- Storm Over Lisbon (1944)
- Grissly's Millions (1945)
- Girls of the Big House (1945)
- Utah (1945)
- Flame of the Barbary Coast (1945)
- The Chicago Kid (1945)
- Sioux City Sue (1946)
- The Catman of Paris (1946)
- Apache Rose (1947)
- Bells of San Angelo (1947)
- Strike It Rich (1948)

== Bibliography ==
- Darby, William. Anthony Mann: The Film Career. McFarland, 2009.
