= Renegade Girl =

1946 film

- Theatrical release poster
- Directed by: William Berke
- Written by: Edwin V. Westrate
- Produced by: William Berke
- Starring: Ann Savage; Alan Curtis; Edward Brophy
- Cinematography: James S. Brown Jr.
- Edited by: Arthur A. Brooks
- Music by: Darrell Calker
- Production company: Affiliated Productions
- Distributed by: Screen Guild Productions
- Release date: 25 December 1946
- Running time: 65 minutes
- Country: United States
- Language: English

Renegade Girl is a 1946 American Western film directed by William Berke and starring Ann Savage, Alan Curtis and Edward Brophy. It was one of a few movies made by the short-lived Affiliated Productions, and was released through Robert L. Lippert's Screen Guild Productions.

== Plot ==
Taking place in rural Missouri, 1864, the area is far from the front lines and has been torn apart by partisan and guerrilla warfare, leaving it at the mercy of outlaws. Jean Shelby comes from a family of southern sympathizers, herself included. She gets information from Union soldiers and provides it to her brother with hopes of helping the confederacy.

The film begins with Shelby riding on the road with her horse, as she passes flaming ruins she is approached by some Union troops who demand she meet with their superior officer, Major Barker. Shelby attempts to flee, but is cornered by more northern soldiers and she complies to meet with Major Barker.

At the Union headquarters, rogue Native American Chief Whitecloud offers information of Jean's brother Bob Shelby. Barker pays Whitecloud $10 to reveal Bob's location in Fontana and tells his men to hang Whitecloud, should the information turn out to be false. When a subordinate of Barker's ask why they should trust Whitecloud, Barker reveals that Whitecloud has a goal of destroying the Shelby family. Sometime ago, Whitecloud tried to kidnap Jean's mother, he was caught and the Cherokee kicked him out. Whitecloud has been a murderous renegade ever since, while still pursuing the Shelbys.

Later, Sergeant James brings Jean Shelby to Major Barker. While Barker is distracted talking to Union Captain Raymond, Shelby pulls a gun on her guard. When Barker and Raymond come into the room to check on the commotion, she makes both men drop their guns. She then escapes out the window and flees on Raymond's horse, leaving Barker furious and Raymond in awe.

Jean rides to her parents' house to warn them of Whitecloud's impending arrival and to get her wounded brother Bob Shelby out of harm's way. Jean and Bob make it out minutes before Whitecloud and the Union soldiers arrive. Union soldiers search the Shelby home, but find nothing. Whitecloud sneaks off from the soldiers and finds Raymond's horse outback, Whitecloud sets out to find Jean and Bob alone.

While riding, Bob falls off his horse. Unable to continue riding, Bob tells Jean to go on without him, Jean leaves Bob under a tree and continues onward. Whitecloud finds Bob alone, meanwhile Jean soon encounters Raymond on the road. They have a civil conversation that is interrupted by the sound of Bob's gunfire, they go to investigate, only to find that Bob has been killed by Whitecloud. Jean's ally, William Quantrail arrives on the scene and attempts to have Raymond hanged as way to pay for Bob's death, but Jean convinces him to turn Raymond over to Jean. Jean and Raymond then setoff to find Whitecloud together. After cutting the ropes around Raymond's hand, Jean tells him to go back so she can bring her brother's body home. Raymond convinces her to set up camp for the night and to let him stay. They begin to form a connection after Raymond reveals his first name and Shelby talks about the work she did during the war with her brother, and now that he is dead she doesn't feel the need to be an outlaw like she once was. When Raymond asks why she is telling him all this, she replies by kissing him.

That same night Whitecloud surrounded by other outlaws boasts about killing Bob Shelby and rallies the outlaws to ride into the night with him to find Jean and cause whatever chaos they can.

In the morning Jean and Raymond hear Whitecloud and his men causing a commotion. He and his men have killed Jeans parents and set their house on fire. When Jean arrives on the scene she is wounded by Whitecloud and saved by Raymond. While recovering in bed, the doctor tells Raymond that her chances of survival are slim. Raymond leaves and has the doctor promise him that he'll keep an eye on Jean until Raymond can returns. Almost a year passes and Jean is able to get out of bed and make a recovery while practicing her shooting. Jean swears she must avenge her family and kill Whitecloud.

Later Jean is visited by her friends Jerry Long and Bob Crandall. Jerry reveals that although the war is over he and a few of Quantrail's men are still acting as if the war had not ended, looking for northerners to kill for money. Jerry wants Jean to join them and asks for her hand in marriage. Jean refuses calling him an outlaw. Jerry reveals she too is a wanted outlaw for helping Quantrail. After some hesitation, Jean accepts the offer to join Jerry and his men if they move to kill Whitecloud first. Raymond soon returns to where Jean has been recovering, only to find a note from her saying she has left to take care of personal business. Raymond decides he must find her. At the meeting with Jerry and his men, Jean says the only thing on her mind is killing Whitecloud and tells everyone to refer to her as Marie Carrol. Jerry again pressures Jean to marry him, she slaps him when he won't acknowledge her refusal.

The next morning, Jean leads the band of outlaws making a name for themselves, but while growing ever unhappy as she continues the outlaw life, but she refuses to give up until she gets revenge on Whitecloud. Whitecloud's men also having been causing chaos themselves across the borders on a murderous rampage.

Eventually Jean learns where Whitecloud is headed and they set out to catch him off-guard. Bob tells Jean that her offer to marry whichever outlaw kills Whitecloud is a bad idea and tensions are rising between the outlaws. The outlaws reveal that they Whitecloud is headed for the country, but the Yankee Cavalry is on their way to intercept Whitecloud and Jean's band of outlaws. Jerry calls off the deal and kills the remaining outlaws. Jean discovers from a dying Bob that Jerry did this so she sends him at gunpoint without any supplies. Jean then realizes she is alone and begins to sink into a depression saying "everything I touch dies." While wandering through the woods, she slips on a hill and passes out under a tree, Union soldiers soon find her and take Jean prisoner.

At Union headquarters, Jean and Raymond reunite. Raymond reveals that he was taken as prisoner of war from Quantrail's men and that Jerry made sure Raymond's letters never made it Jean. Raymond decides that they will marry tomorrow and Jean gladly accepts stating her love for him. Jean tells Raymond she must leave to get a dress to be married in, but she actually leaves to confront Whitecloud alone. Raymond follows with a platoon in tow.

Whitecloud and his men are burning town to the ground and shooting everything in sight. Raymond sees the smoke and tells his men to fire. Jean took the wrong road and comes into the crossfire; she finds Whitecloud and shoots him dead, but not before he manages to shoot her too. Jean dies in Raymond's arms saying the only thing she ever wanted was Raymond's love.

== Cast ==
- Ann Savage as Jean Shelby
- Alan Curtis as Capt. Fred Raymond
- Edward Brophy as Bob Crandall
- Russell Wade as Jerry Long
- Jack Holt as Maj. Barker
- Claudia Drake as Mary Manson
- Ray Corrigan as William Quantrill
- John 'Dusty' King as Cpl. Brown
- Chief Thundercloud as Chief White Cloud
- Edmund Cobb as Sgt. James
- Dick Curtis as Joe Barnes, raider
- Nick Thompson as Tom Starr
- James Martin as Bob Shelby
- Harry Cording as Miller
- Ernie Adams as Gang Member Ted
- Forrest Taylor as Dr. Manson (uncredited)

== Production ==
Ann Savage had previously made two films with director William Berke, Saddles and Sagebrush (1943) and The Last Horseman (1944).

== See also ==
- List of films and television shows about the American Civil War
