= Kate Rockwell =

Kate Rockwell may refer to:

- Kathleen "Kate" Rockwell (born 1873), American vaudeville performer
- Kate Rockwell (actress) (born 1984), American actress
