= Storm Over Lisbon =

1944 film by George Sherman

- Theatrical release poster
- Directed by: George Sherman
- Written by: Dane Lussier (adaptation)
- Screenplay by: Doris Gilbert
- Story by: Elizabeth Meehan
- Produced by: George Sherman
- Starring: Vera Hruba Ralston
- Cinematography: John Alton
- Edited by: Arthur Roberts
- Color process: Black and white
- Production company: Republic Pictures
- Distributed by: Republic Pictures
- Release date: October 16, 1944 (United States)
- Running time: 86 minutes
- Country: United States
- Language: English

Storm Over Lisbon is a 1944 American thriller film produced and directed by George Sherman and starring Vera Ralston, Richard Arlen and Erich Von Stroheim. The screenplay concerns a nightclub owner who attempts to gain secret information.

The film's sets were designed by the art director Gano Chittenden.

== Plot ==
During World War II, the owner of a Lisbon nightclub attempts to gain secret information to sell to the Japanese.

== Cast ==
- Vera Hruba Ralston as Maria Mazarek
- Richard Arlen as John Craig
- Erich von Stroheim as Deresco
- Otto Kruger as Alexis Vanderlyn
- Eduardo Ciannelli as Blanco
- Robert Livingston as Bill Flanagan
- Mona Barrie as Evelyn
- Frank Orth as Murgatroyd
- Sarah Edwards as Maude Perry-Tonides
- Alice Fleming as Agatha Sanford-Richards
- Kenne Duncan as Paul
- Leon Belasco as Fado Singer
- The Aida Broadbent Girls as Dancers

== Restoration ==
A new restoration of Storm Over Lisbon by Paramount Pictures, The Film Foundation, and Martin Scorsese was screened at the Museum of Modern Art on February 9, 2018, as part of the museum's program of showcasing 30 restored films from the library of Republic Pictures curated by Scorsese.

== Bibliography ==
- Lennig, Arthur. Stroheim. University Press of Kentucky, 2000.
