= The Wife of Monte Cristo =

1946 film by Edgar George Ulmer

- Directed by: Edgar G. Ulmer
- Screenplay by: Dorcas Cochran; Edgar G. Ulmer
- Based on: The Count of Monte Cristo by Alexandre Dumas
- Produced by: Leon Fromkess
- Starring: John Loder; Lenore Aubert; Fritz Kortner
- Cinematography: Edward A. Kull
- Edited by: Douglas W. Bagier
- Music by: Paul Dessau
- Production company: Producers Releasing Corporation
- Distributed by: Producers Releasing Corporation
- Release date: April 23, 1946
- Running time: 83 minutes
- Country: United States
- Language: English

The Wife of Monte Cristo is a 1946 American historical adventure film directed by Edgar G. Ulmer and starring John Loder, Lenore Aubert and Fritz Kortner. The film is yet another spiritual epic inspired by the novel The Count of Monte Cristo and features its protagonist Edmond Dantès. It was made and distributed by Producers Releasing Corporation, on a higher budget than was usual for the studio which focused on cheap second features. It was successful at the box office.

The film takes the same name as an unofficial sequel novel to The Count of Monte Cristo, namely The Wife of Monte Cristo, published in 1884 and attributed to Dumas; however, the novel was actually the first book of a two-volume English translation of the novel, The Son of Monte Cristo, written by Jules Lermina in 1881.

== Plot ==
Edmund Dantes, The Count of Monte Cristo, returns in 1832, now accompanied by his wife, Countess Haydee. Dantes is seeking revenge against those responsible for his imprisonment, and justice for the Parisians being mistreated by the Prefect of Police. Wearing a mask and going by "The Avenger", Dantes finds himself fighting with the Gendarmerie, getting wounded, and having Haydee wear the mask in his stead and take his place as "The Avenger".

== Cast ==
- John Loder as De Villefort, Prefect of Police
- Lenore Aubert as Countess of Monte Cristo Haydée
- Fritz Kortner as Maillard
- Charles Dingle as Danglars
- Eduardo Ciannelli as Jacques Antoine
- Martin Kosleck as Edmund Dantes, Count of Monte Cristo
- Fritz Feld as Bonnett
- Eva Gabor as Mme. Lucille Maillard
- Clancy Cooper as Baptiste
- John Bleifer as Louis
- Egon Brecher as Proprietor
- Anthony Warde as Captain Benoit
- Colin Campbell as Abbe Faria
- Virginia Christine as Florice Michaud

== Bibliography ==
- Isenberg, Noah William. Edgar G. Ulmer: A Filmmaker at the Margins. University of California Press, 2014.
