= Adele Mara =

American actress (1923–2010)

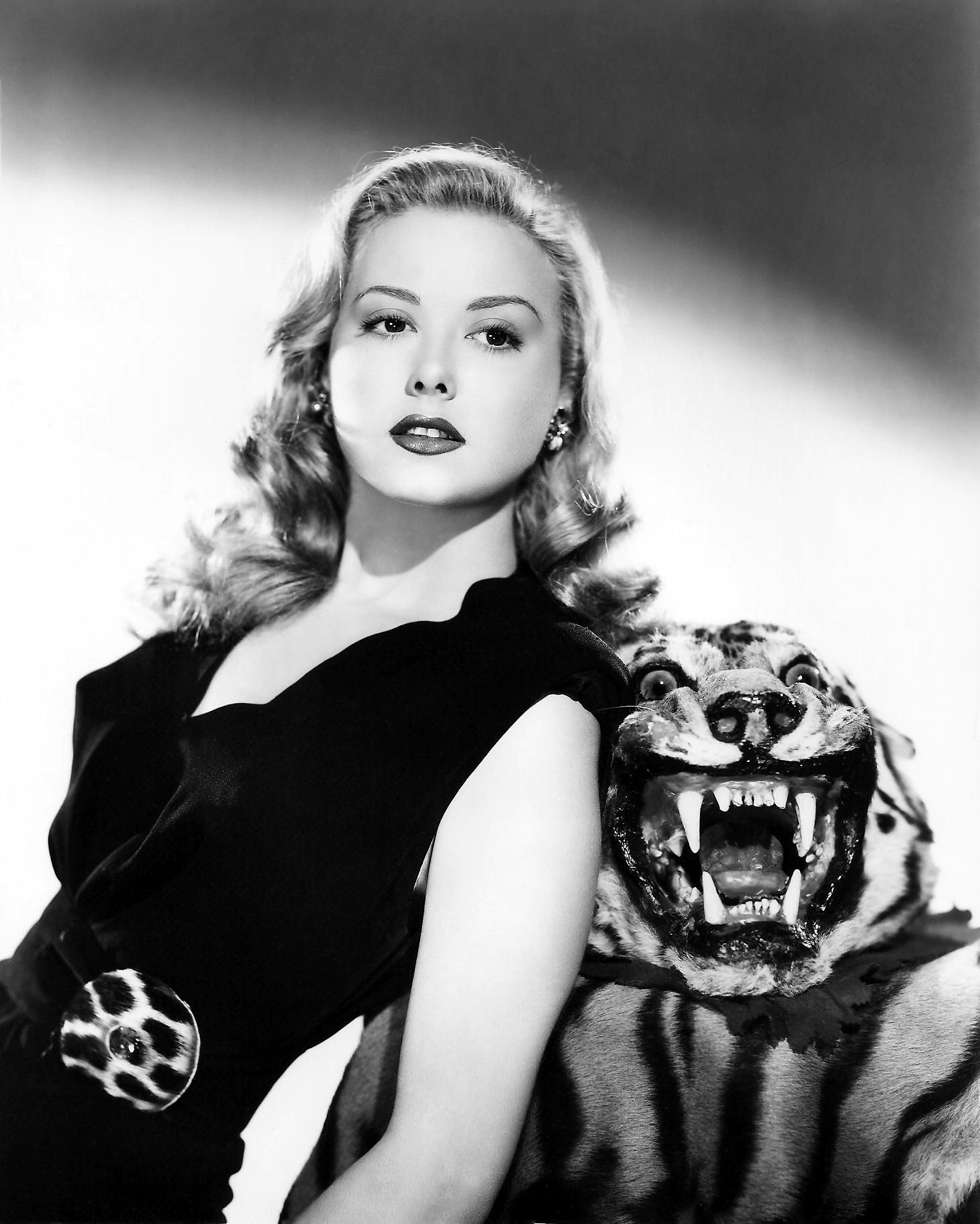
- Publicity still of Mara for The Tiger Woman (1945)
- Born: Adelaide Delgado; April 28, 1923; Highland Park, Michigan, U.S.
- Died: May 7, 2010 (aged 87); Pacific Palisades, California, U.S.
- Occupations: Actress; singer; dancer
- Years active: 1941–1978
- Spouse: Roy Huggins (m. 1952; died 2002)
- Children: 3

Adele Mara (born Adelaide Delgado; April 28, 1923 – May 7, 2010) was an American actress, singer, and dancer, who appeared in films during the 1940s and 1950s and on television in the 1950s and 1960s.

== Early years ==
Mara was born Adelaide Delgado in Highland Park, Michigan, to Spanish parents Angel Delgado and Eloisa. She had a brother, Luis Delgado (1925-1997), who became an actor.

== Career ==
=== Dancing ===
Mara danced as part of bandleader Xavier Cugat's show as well as on two episodes of Maverick entitled "Seed of Deception" and "The Spanish Dancer".

=== Film ===
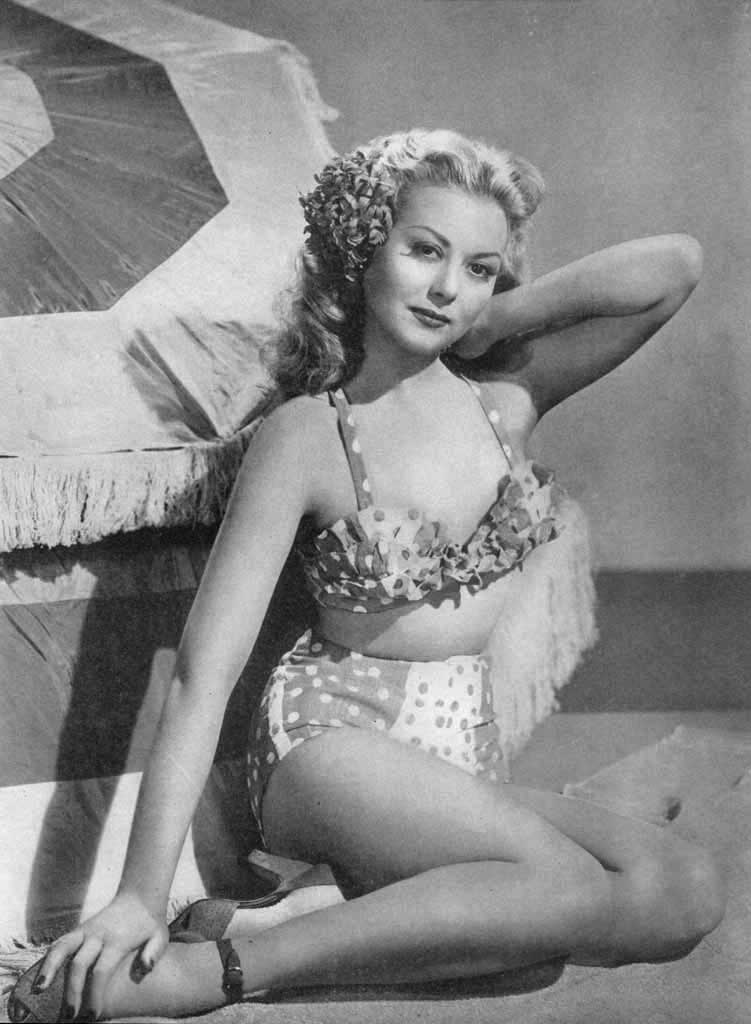
1947 publicity photo

Under the professional name of Adele St. Mara, she won a contract with Columbia Pictures and gained experience in the studio's "B" features and comedy shorts. She soon shortened her name to Adele Mara. One of Mara's early roles was as a receptionist in the Three Stooges film I Can Hardly Wait. Mara and Leslie Brooks played the sisters of Rita Hayworth's character in the Fred Astaire film You Were Never Lovelier. In Alias Boston Blackie (1942), she plays the leading female role, as the sister of an escaped and wrongfully accused convict.

When her Columbia contract lapsed, she moved to Republic Pictures, where she became a fixture in the studio's Westerns and outdoor adventures. She appeared in The Vampire's Ghost, Wake of the Red Witch starring John Wayne, Angel in Exile (leading lady), Sands of Iwo Jima with John Wayne in which she was John Agar's love interest, California Passage (leading lady), and Don Siegel's Count the Hours (supporting role).

=== Television ===
In 1955 Mara appeared as Sarita on the TV Western Cheyenne in the episode "Border Showdown". In 1958, Mara played Maria Costa in the Bat Masterson episode "Double Showdown" with Gene Barry. In 1961, Mara appeared as a nurse with Cesar Romero on CBS's The Red Skelton Show in a sketch titled "Deadeye and The Alamo". About this time, she guest-starred on the NBC Western series The Tall Man with Clu Gulager, as well as three episodes of Maverick (one with James Garner and Jack Kelly and two with only Kelly), and episodes of Laramie, Tales of Wells Fargo with Dale Robertson and The Life and Legend of Wyatt Earp with Hugh O'Brian. In 1961 she appeared in an episode of Boris Karloff’s Thriller series called The Beckoning Ghost. She also appeared in the Alfred Hitchcock Hour episode "House Guest" in 1962.

== Personal life ==
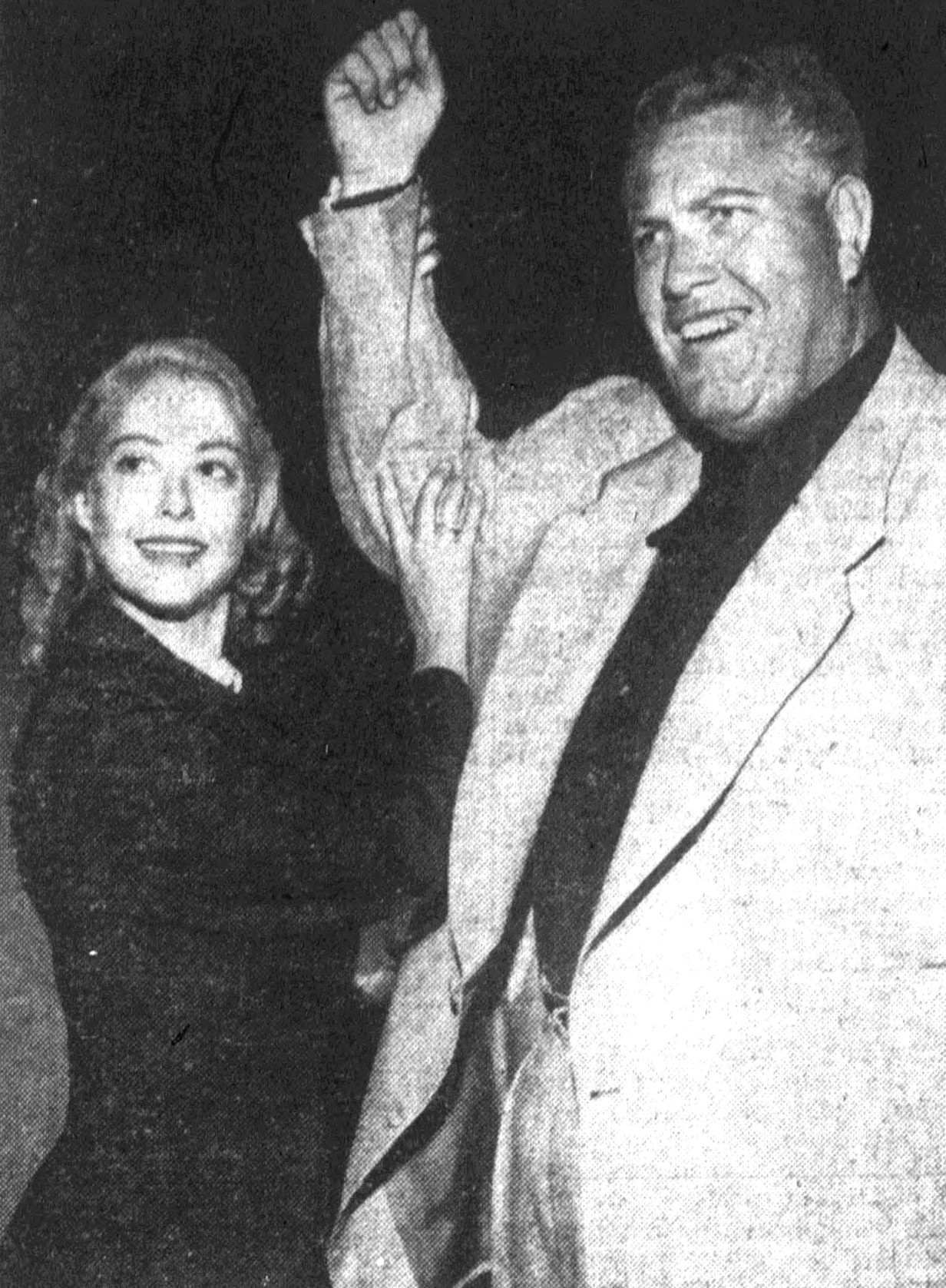
Adele Mara and American professional wrestler Jules Strongbow (John Ralph Bilbo) in 1951

Mara was married to screenwriter/series creator/producer/novelist Roy Huggins and appeared as the leading lady in three episodes of his 1957 television series Maverick starring James Garner and Jack Kelly. They had three sons, Thomas in 1960, John in 1961, and James Patrick in 1963 and remained married until his death at age 87; the marriage had spanned half a century from 1952 to 2002.

Mara's brother, Luis Delgado, played small, often uncredited roles in films and TV, especially in the projects of his close friend James Garner, for whom Delgado also worked as a personal assistant.

== Death ==
Mara died of natural causes at age 87 on May 7, 2010.

== Selected filmography ==
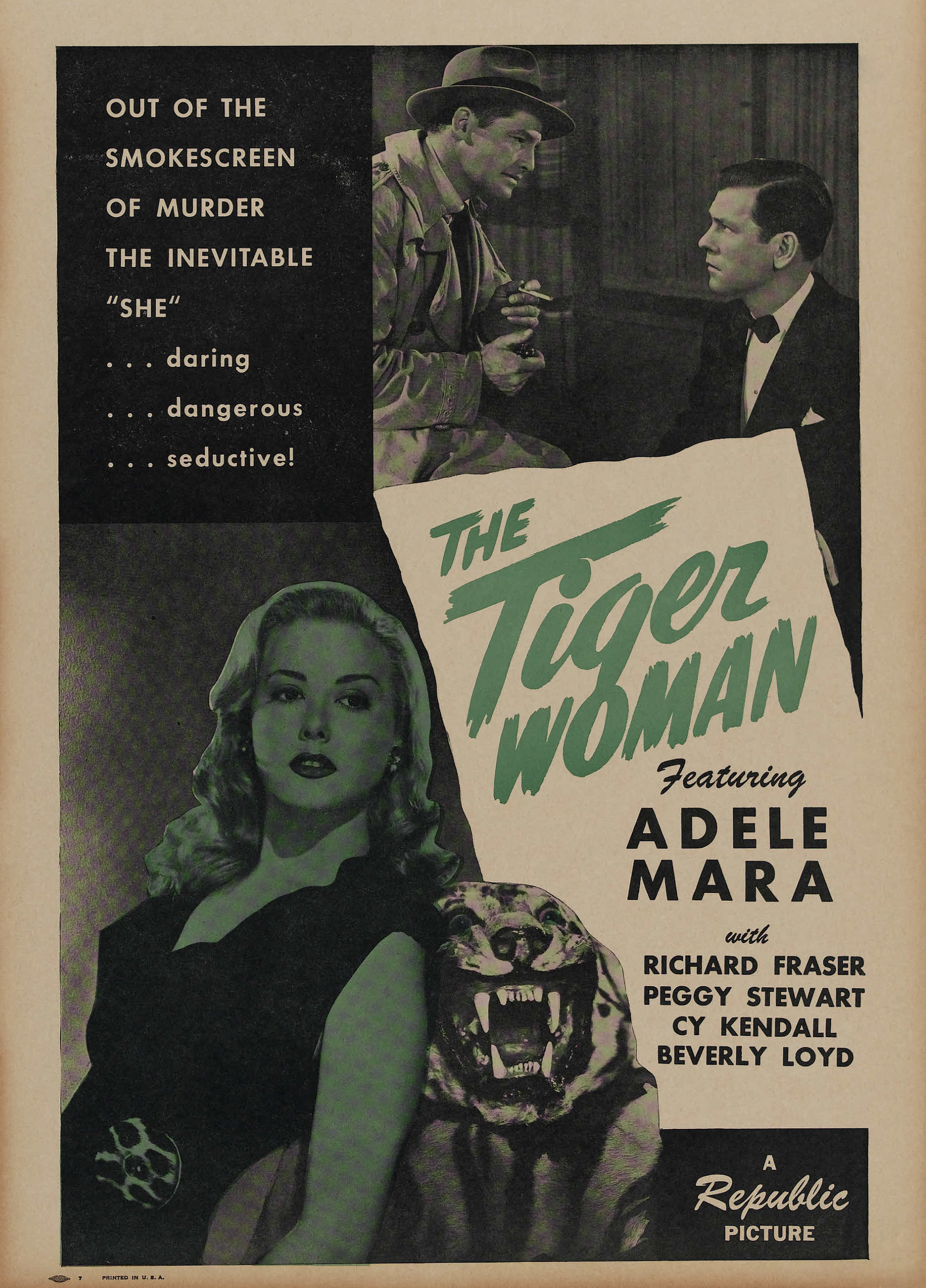
The Tiger Woman (1945)

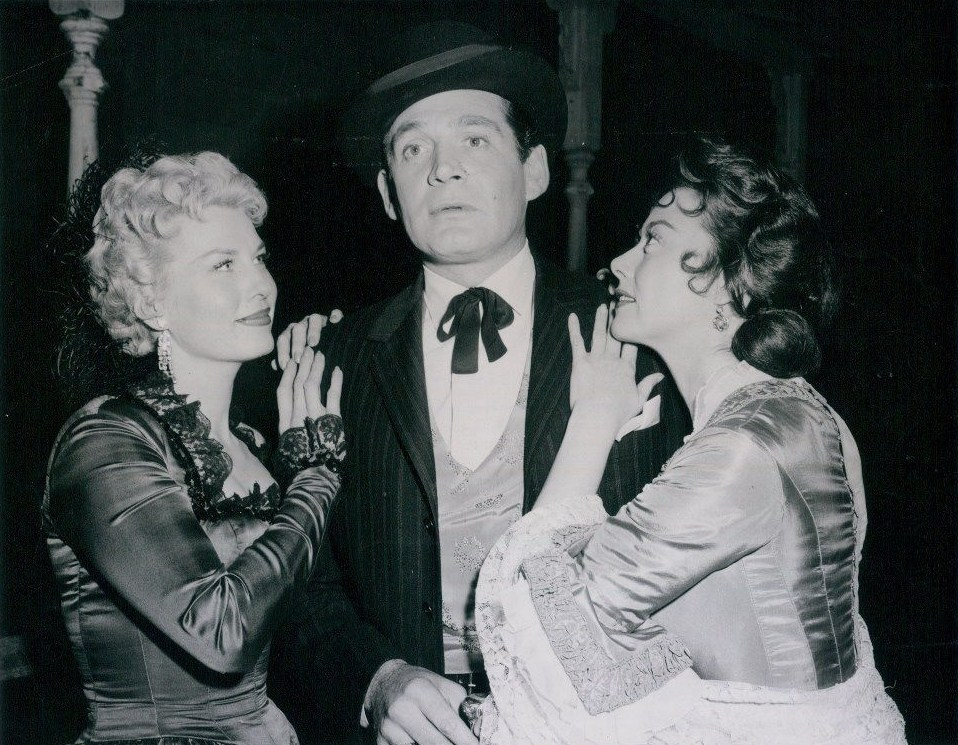
Adele Mara (r.) with Jean Willes and Gene Barry in Bat Masterson (1959)

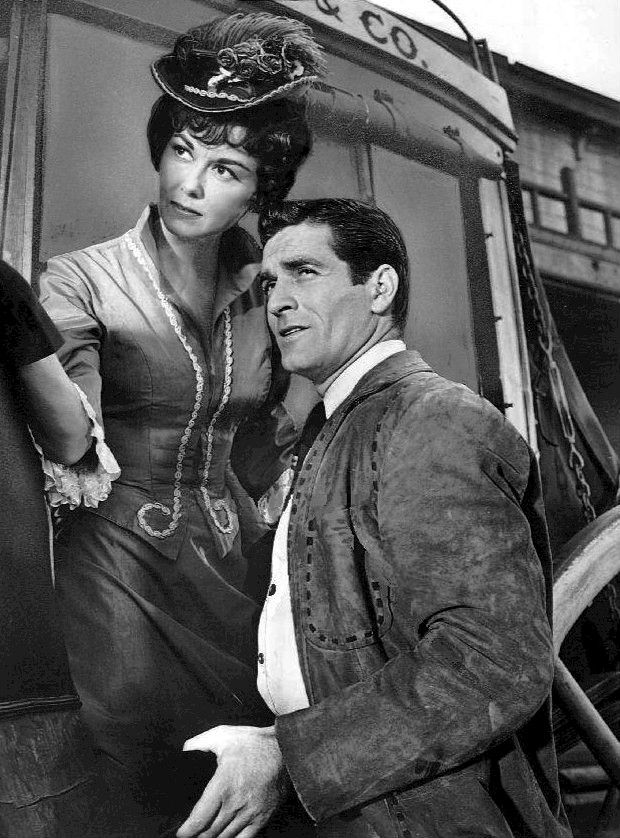
With Hugh O'Brian in The Life and Legend of Wyatt Earp (1961)

- Honolulu Lu (1941) as Debutante (uncredited)
- Navy Blues (1941)
- You Were Never Lovelier (1942) as Lita Acuna
- Alias Boston Blackie (1942) as Eve Sanders
- Blondie Goes to College (1942) as Babs Connelly
- Shut My Big Mouth (1942)
- Crime Doctor (1943) as Nurse (uncredited)
- Redhead from Manhattan (1943) as Check Girl (uncredited)
- Riders of the Northwest Mounted (1943) as Gabrielle Renaud (uncredited)
- Reveille with Beverly (1943) as Evelyn Ross
- Call of the South Seas (1944) as Aritana
- Atlantic City (1944) as Adele – Barmaid
- The Fighting Seabees (1944) as Twinkler Tucker – Jitterbugger (uncredited)
- Faces in the Fog (1944) as Gertrude
- Thoroughbreds (1944) as Sally Crandall
- Girls of the Big House (1945) as Harriett
- Song of Mexico (1945) as Carol Adams
- The Tiger Woman (1945) as Sharon Winslow
- Bells of Rosarita (1945) as Patty Phillips
- Flame of Barbary Coast (1945) as Marie (uncredited)
- The Vampire's Ghost (1945) as Lisa
- Earl Carroll Vanities (1945) as Chorine (uncredited)
- Grissly's Millions (1945) as Maribelle
- The Inner Circle (1946) as Geraldine Travis alias Gerry Smith
- I've Always Loved You (1946) as Senorita Fortalega
- The Magnificent Rogue (1946) as Sugar Lee
- The Invisible Informer (1946) as Marie Ravelle
- The Last Crooked Mile (1946) as Bonnie
- Night Train to Memphis (1946) as Constance Stephenson
- Traffic in Crime (1946) as Silk Cantrell
- Passkey to Danger (1946) as Renee Beauchamps
- The Catman of Paris (1946) as Marguerite Duval
- A Guy Could Change (1946) as Bernice
- Exposed (1947) as Belinda Prentice
- Blackmail (1947) as Sylvia Duane
- Robin Hood of Texas (1947) as Julie
- The Trespasser (1947) as Deedee
- Web of Danger (1947) as Peg Mallory
- Twilight on the Rio Grande (1947) as Elena Del Rio
- Wake of the Red Witch (1948) as Teleia Van Schreeven
- Night Time in Nevada (1948) as Joan Andrews
- Angel in Exile (1948) as Raquel Chavez
- I, Jane Doe (1948) as Marga–Jane Hastings
- The Gallant Legion (1948) as Catalina
- Campus Honeymoon (1948) as Bessie Ormsbee
- The Main Street Kid (1948) as Gloria
- Sands of Iwo Jima (1949) as Allison Bromley
- Rock Island Trail (1950) as Constance Strong
- California Passage (1950) as Beth Martin
- The Avengers (1950) as Maria Moreno
- The Sea Hornet (1951) as Suntan Radford aka Golbraid
- Count the Hours (1953) as Gracie Sager – Max Verne's girlfriend
- The Black Whip (1956) as Ruthie Dawson
- Back from Eternity (1956) as Maria Alvarez, an airplane stewardess
- Curse of the Faceless Man (1958) as Maria Fiorillo
- The Big Circus (1959) as Maria 'Mama' Colino
- The Alfred Hitchcock Hour (1962) (Season 1 Episode 8: "House Guest") as Eve Sherston
