= Call of the South Seas =

1944 film by John English

- Film poster
- Directed by: John English
- Written by: Albert DeMond
- Produced by: Walter H. Goetz
- Starring: Janet Martin; Allan Lane; William Henry
- Cinematography: William Bradford
- Edited by: Richard L. Van Enger
- Music by: Marlin Skiles
- Production company: Republic Pictures
- Distributed by: Republic Pictures
- Release date: April 7, 1944
- Running time: 59 minutes
- Country: United States
- Language: English

Call of the South Seas is a 1944 American action film directed by John English, starring Janet Martin, Allan Lane and William Henry.

The film's sets were designed by the art director Gano Chittenden.

== Cast ==
- Janet Martin as Princess Tahia
- Allan Lane as Kendall Gaige
- William Henry as Agent Paul Russell
- Roy Barcroft as Steve Landrau
- Wally Vernon as Handsome
- Adele Mara as Aritana
- Duncan Renaldo as Commissioner Charcot
- Frank Jaquet as Judge Fator
- Anna Demetrio as Latona
- Richard Alexander as Bailey
- Nina Campana as Nona
- Satini Pualoa as Kualu
- Budd Buster as Kanahu
- John Eberts as Manu
- Margia Dean as Waitress

== Bibliography ==
- Langman, Larry. Return to Paradise: A Guide to South Sea Island Films. Scarecrow Press, 1998.
