= A Window on Washington Park =

1913 film

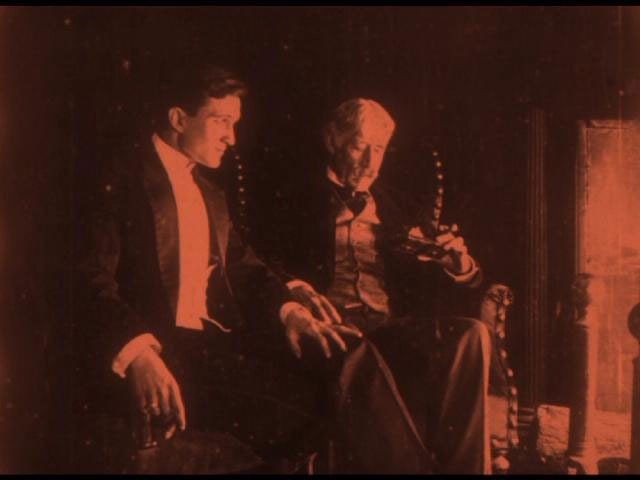
Tom Powers and Charles Kent in A Window on Washington Park

A Window on Washington Park (full film)

A Window on Washington Park is a 1913 film directed by Laurence Trimble, produced by Vitagraph Studios. The 15-minute short film is about a millionaire who notices this poor old man in the park and brings him in his house to try to help him. The old man then tells him how he lost his money and at the same time where his daughter left him.

This film was one of those lost or unknown to survive films. In 2009 a copy of the film was found in the New Zealand Film Archive along with 75 other films. The film is viewable on the National Film Preservation Foundation website with no musical score.

== Cast ==
- Tom Powers as the young millionaire
- Charles Kent as Mr. Wescott as an old man
- Courtenay Foote as Mr. Wescott as a young man
- Florence Turner as Primrose
