= Kathleen Rockwell =

American dancer and vaudeville star

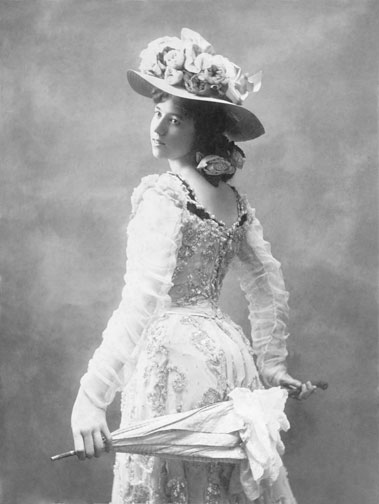
Studio portrait of Kathleen Rockwell

Kathleen Eloise Rockwell (October 4, 1873/1876/1880 (year of birth disputed) – February 21, 1957), known as "Klondike Kate" and later known as Kate Rockwell Warner Matson Van Duren, was an American dancer and vaudeville star during the Klondike Gold Rush, where she met Alexander Pantages who later became a very successful vaudeville/motion picture mogul. She garnered notoriety for her flirtatious dancing and ability to keep hard-working miners happy if not inebriated. Before her death she appeared on the television show You Bet Your Life with Groucho Marx December 23, 1954, at the age of 74. She died in obscurity after some minor success training Hollywood starlets in the 1940s.

== Biography ==
Rockwell was born in Junction City, Kansas, according to her death certificate, and lived in North Dakota for a while but grew up in Spokane, Washington.

Her stepfather was wealthy and provided her with French, voice, and instrumental lessons.

Her parents sent Rockwell to several boarding schools, but Rockwell was expelled from the various institutions.

In the 1890s, after divorcing her second husband, Rockwell's mother moved with her to New York City. Here the younger Rockwell made an unsuccessful attempt at show business. She left for greener pastures and arrived in Alaska in 1899. The Royal Canadian Mounted Police held a tight leash on prospective miners and various hangers-on trying to get to the Yukon and find fortunes in gold. Refused entry by a Mountie, she is reputed to have donned a boy's outfit and jumped on a boat headed for the Yukon.

First working as a tap-dancer in Whitehorse, Rockwell found her stride in Dawson City as a member of the Savoy Theatrical Company. Her act was very popular with the miners, and she was dubbed "Klondike Kate" as a result.

It was in Dawson that she met Alexander Pantages, in autumn 1900, after leaving the Savoy troupe and joining the stock company at the Orpheum Theatre, which Pantages managed.

The intense love affair between Pantages and Rockwell became the stuff of legend in the Yukon, although streaks of jealousy ensured that they found more stability in their professional lives than in their personal ones. They were not above swindling unsuspecting miners, and this dubious quality eventually infected their own relationship. She later accused him of reneging on a promise to marry her as well as attempting to cheat her of her money. Pantages surprised Rockwell by secretly marrying another woman, and telling her about it four days later in a letter.

In 1902, the Klondike Gold Rush was already dying out and Rockwell headed south, first to British Columbia, where she set up a store-front movie theater, and eventually to Oregon, where she homesteaded 320 acres of land. After performing for years on stage even into her 40s, Kate Rockwell headed to Brothers, Oregon, with $3,500 in cash and $3,000 worth of jewelry, and trunks filled with dresses, gowns and hats. She was one of a number of women who claimed their land by living on the claim for the required five years. This was shortly after women had earned the right to vote in Oregon. She was known to have worked the land, and to work in her garden in vaudeville gowns and dance slippers.

While waiting out the five years to earn the title to the land, Rockwell fell in love with and married a cowboy named Floyd Warner.

Later she married a miner named John Matson. Shortly after they earned the title, they sold the land. The marriage didn't last. Rockwell was soon living in Bend, Oregon, where she quickly reached celebrity status once again. This time it was more for her charitable work than anything else. Her personality and friendly nature ensured she always had friends wherever she went.

She eventually was known by locals as "Aunt Kate", and according to reports from Bend locals, "She was a fund-raising dynamo, able to shake down almost any business or person for a contribution to a social cause; during the Great Depression she made gallons and gallons of soup to help out the hobos".

She never achieved any of the fame she had briefly held in the Yukon, although she made full use of the memories. "Sourdough" reunions in the 1930s provided a measure of uptick in her fame, as did training young Hollywood starlets in the 1940s. She lived in Oregon for the last 45 years of her life, first in the Bend area, then near Salem, and finally in Linn County.

Rockwell appeared on the December 23, 1954 episode of You Bet Your Life, hosted by Groucho Marx.

She married William L. Van Duren, who was her husband at the time of her death. Rockwell died on February 21, 1957, in Sweet Home, Oregon, where she had lived for 21 years. The immediate cause of death was "Ventricular Fibrillation", with "Chronic Congestive Heart Failure" and "Arteriosclerotic Heart disease" given as underlying conditions. Her ashes were later scattered in Central Oregon.

== Film ==
In 1943, Columbia Pictures released a motion picture dramatized biography loosely based on her life called Klondike Kate, which starred Ann Savage.

== Cultural influence ==
In 1935, British bandleader Billy Cotton recorded a single titled "Klondyke Kate".

Ernie Pyle has a chapter about Klondike Kate (whom he calls Kate Rothrock) in his book Home Country.

She's the main inspiration for the Disney character Glittering Goldie, long-time love interest of Scrooge McDuck.

Since 1971, "Klondike Kate" has been a vaudeville performer appearing at the St. Paul Winter Carnival. Inspired by the historic Klondike Kate, each year's Klondike Kate is chosen through a contest.
