= Lenore Aubert =

American actress

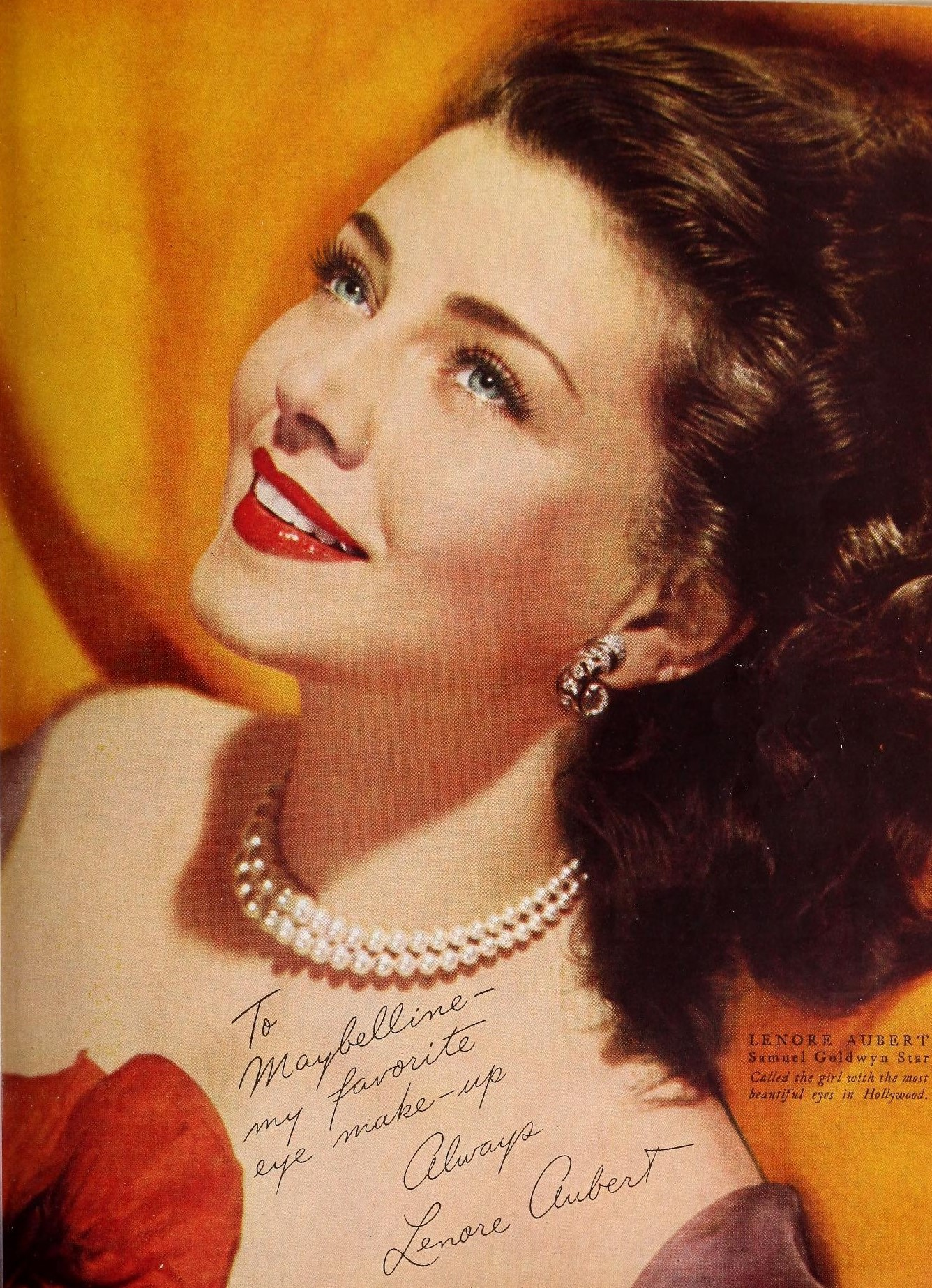
- Aubert in 1945
- Born: Eleanore Maria Leisner; April 18, 1913; Celje, Austria-Hungary (now Slovenia)
- Died: July 31, 1993 (aged 80); Great Neck, Long Island, New York, U.S.
- Years active: 1938–1952
- Known for: Dr. Sandra Mornay
- Notable work: Abbott and Costello Meet Frankenstein (1948)
- Spouses: Julius Altman (m. 1938; div. 1956) Milton Greene (m. 1959; div. 1974)

Lenore Aubert (born Eleonore Maria Leisner, April 18, 1913 (Note: The book Women in Horror Films, 1940s says that Aubert was born "on April 18, 1913 (although 1918 was given in publicity).") – July 31, 1993) was a model and Hollywood actress best known for her movie roles as exotic, mysterious women.

== Early years ==
Aubert was born in what is now Celje, Slovenia (what was at the time the Austro-Hungarian Empire). She grew up in Vienna.

== Career ==
In New York, she found work as a model and was eventually offered a stage role as Lorraine Sheldon in The Man Who Came to Dinner at the La Jolla Playhouse in San Diego. She began her U.S. film career in the early 1940s, taking the French-sounding screen name Lenore Aubert.

Her European accent limited her choice of roles, and she played such parts as a Nazi spy and a French war bride. She was most fond of her role in the 1947 film I Wonder Who's Kissing Her Now, playing glamorous entertainer Fritzi Barrington. Her best-known role was as Dr. Sandra Mornay, a beautiful but sinister scientist, in the 1948 horror-comedy Abbott and Costello Meet Frankenstein.

On June 4, 1950, Aubert co-starred in "People vs. William Tait", an episode of the television court show Famous Jury Trials.

== Later years ==
Aubert's film career was basically over by the end of the 1940s. She and her husband then moved back to New York City, starting a garment business. A few years later, the couple divorced. She went back to Europe, only to return to the United States in 1959.

She did volunteer work for the United Nations Activities and Housing Section and the Museum of Natural History. In 1983, she suffered a stroke, which eventually impaired her memory.

Much of Aubert's life after her film career is known from a personal interview in August 1987 by Jim McPherson (1938-2002) of the Toronto Sun. He was editor of the Sun's TV listings magazine from its launch in 1973 until his retirement in 1994.

== Personal life ==
Aubert was married to Julius Altman, who was Jewish, and the couple fled Austria after the Anschluss to escape Nazi persecution. They moved to the United States after spending time in Paris.

She returned to the United States as the wife of millionaire Milton Greene. They divorced in 1974.

== Filmography ==
Year	Title	Role	Notes
1938	Bluebeard's Eighth Wife	Party Guest	Uncredited
1943	They Got Me Covered	Mrs. Vanescu	
1944	Passport to Destiny	Grete Neumann	
1944	Action in Arabia	Mounirah al-Rashid	
1945	Having Wonderful Crime	Gilda Mayfair	
1946	The Catman of Paris	Marie Audet	
1946	The Wife of Monte Cristo	Countess of Monte Cristo Haydée	
1947	The Other Love	Yvonne Dupré	
1947	I Wonder Who's Kissing Her Now	Fritzi Barrington	
1947	The Prairie	Ellen Wade	
1948	The Return of the Whistler	Alice Dupres Barkley	
1948	Abbott and Costello Meet Frankenstein	Sandra Mornay	
1949	Barbary Pirate	Zoltah	
1949	Abbott and Costello Meet the Killer, Boris Karloff	Angela Gordon	
1949	The Silver Theatre		Episode: "The Farewell Supper"
1949	Suspense		Episode: "The Thin Edge of Violence"
1950	Actors Studio		2 episodes
1950	Famous Jury Trials		Episode: "The People vs. William Tait"
1951	Falschmunzer am Werk	Madame Winter	
1952	A Girl on the Road	Princesse Véra	(final film role)
