= Klondike Kate (film) =

1943 film by William Castle

- Theatrical release poster
- Directed by: William Castle
- Screenplay by: M. Coates Webster; Houston Branch
- Story by: M. Coates Wenster; William A. Pierce ("The Life of Kate Rockwell Matson")
- Produced by: Irving Briskin
- Starring: Ann Savage; Tom Neal
- Cinematography: John Stumar
- Edited by: Mel Thorsen
- Color process: Black and white
- Production company: Columbia Pictures
- Distributed by: Columbia Pictures
- Release date: December 16, 1943
- Running time: 64 minutes
- Country: United States
- Language: English

Klondike Kate is a 1943 American Western film directed by William Castle and starring Ann Savage and Tom Neal. Set in Alaska during the Klondike Gold Rush of the 1890s, it is loosely based on the story of a real figure known as Klondike Kate. She personally selected Savage, a contract starlet at Columbia Pictures, to play her. It was the first time Savage appeared in a lead role.

The film's sets were designed by the art director Lionel Banks. Although the film was a B Picture, it had a higher budget than many such productions and employed numerous extras.

== Plot ==
A young man in Alaska finds himself accused of murder, and must fight to clear his name.

== Cast ==
- Ann Savage as Kathleen O'Day
- Tom Neal as Jefferson Braddock
- Glenda Farrell as Molly
- Constance Worth as Lita
- Sheldon Leonard as 'Sometime' Smith
- Lester Allen as Duster Dan
- George Cleveland as Judge Horace Crawford

== See also ==
- List of American films of 1943

== Bibliography ==
- Jordan, Joe. Showmanship: The Cinema of William Castle. BearManor Media, 2014.
- Morton, Lisa & Adamson, Kent. Savage Detours: The Life and Work of Ann Savage. McFarland, 2009.
