= The Last Crooked Mile =

1946 film by Philip Ford

- Theatrical release poster
- Directed by: Philip Ford
- Screenplay by: Jerry Sackheim; Jerome Gruskin (additional dialogue)
- Produced by: Rudolph E. Abel (associate producer)
- Starring: Don "Red" Barry; Ann Savage; Adele Mara; Tom Powers; Sheldon Leonard; Nestor Paiva
- Cinematography: Alfred S. Keller
- Edited by: William P. Thompson
- Music by: Joseph Dubin
- Production company: Republic Pictures
- Distributed by: Republic Pictures
- Release date: August 9, 1946
- Running time: 67 minutes
- Country: United States
- Language: English

The Last Crooked Mile is a 1946 American crime film directed by Philip Ford and written by Jerry Sackheim and Jerome Gruskin. The film stars Don "Red" Barry, Ann Savage, Adele Mara, Tom Powers, Sheldon Leonard and Nestor Paiva. The film was released on August 9, 1946, by Republic Pictures.

== Plot ==
After the Jarvis gang pulls off a bank robbery, one member is killed in the subsequent shootout and the rest flee in their getaway car. They are recognized at a roadblock and pursued by police. The criminals, including Jarvis, are killed in a crash. The getaway car is sold to a carnival sideshow. An insurance investigator and some surviving gang members begin searching for the missing cash. The investigator tracks down Jarvis' girlfriend at a cabaret. Several violent incidents occur as he closes in on the location of the money and the remaining culprits.

== Cast ==
- Don "Red" Barry as Tom Dwyer
- Ann Savage as Sheila Kennedy
- Adele Mara as Bonnie
- Tom Powers as Floyd Sorelson
- Sheldon Leonard as Ed 'Wires' MacGuire
- Nestor Paiva as Ferrara
- Harry Shannon as Police Lt. Blake
- Ben Welden as Haynes
- John Miljan as Police Lt. Mayrin
- Charles D. Brown as Dietrich
- John Dehner as Jarvis
- Anthony Caruso as Charlie
- The Seven Pods of Pepper as Singing Group
