= Night Train to Memphis =

1946 film by Lesley Selander

- Theatrical release poster
- Directed by: Lesley Selander
- Screenplay by: Dorrell McGowan; Stuart E. McGowan
- Produced by: Dorrell McGowan; Stuart E. McGowan
- Starring: Roy Acuff; Allan Lane; Adele Mara; Irving Bacon; Joseph Crehan; Emma Dunn
- Cinematography: William Bradford
- Edited by: Tony Martinelli
- Music by: R. Dale Butts; Joseph Dubin; Mort Glickman
- Production company: Republic Pictures
- Distributed by: Republic Pictures
- Release date: July 12, 1946
- Running time: 66 minutes
- Country: United States
- Language: English

Night Train to Memphis is a 1946 American action film directed by Lesley Selander and written by Dorrell McGowan and Stuart E. McGowan. The film stars Roy Acuff, Allan Lane, Adele Mara, Irving Bacon, Joseph Crehan and Emma Dunn. The film was released on July 12, 1946, by Republic Pictures. The film is a named after the song "Night Train to Memphis", which Acuff first recorded in 1942.

== Cast ==
- Roy Acuff as Roy Acuff
- Roy Acuff's Smoky Mountain Boys as Roy Acuff Band
- Allan Lane as Dan Acuff
- Adele Mara as Constance Stephenson
- Irving Bacon as Rainbow
- Joseph Crehan as John Stevenson
- Emma Dunn as Ma Acuff
- Roy Barcroft as Chad Morgan
- Kenne Duncan as Asa Morgan
- LeRoy Mason as Wilson
- Nick Stewart as Train Porter
- Nina Mae McKinney as Maid
- Francis McDonald as Doctor
- Joel Friedkin as Minister
