= They Got Me Covered =

1943 film by David Butler

- Directed by: David Butler
- Screenplay by: Harry Kurnitz; Frank Fenton; Lynn Root
- Story by: Leo Rosten; Leonard Spigelgass
- Produced by: Samuel Goldwyn
- Starring: Bob Hope; Dorothy Lamour; Otto Preminger; Lenore Aubert
- Cinematography: Rudolph Maté
- Edited by: Daniel Mandell
- Music by: Harold Arlen; Leigh Harline
- Production company: Samuel Goldwyn Productions
- Distributed by: RKO Radio Pictures
- Release date: January 27, 1943 (San Francisco)
- Running time: 95 minutes
- Country: United States
- Language: English
- Box office: $1.5 million (US rentals)

They Got Me Covered is a 1943 American comedy thriller film directed by David Butler and starring Bob Hope and Dorothy Lamour. Otto Preminger appears in a supporting role. It also known by the alternative titles Washington Story and The Washington Angle.

== Plot ==
In mid 1941, acclaimed Pulitzer Prize-winning newspaper reporter Robert "Kit" Kittredge returns to the U.S. from his position as their Moscow correspondent. He is fired for his incompetency by his editor, Norman Mason, the minute he comes back, since he has neglected to report that Germany recently has invaded Russia.

Kit goes to see his girlfriend, stenographer Christina Hill, at work in another newspaper in Washington, D.C. Their meeting is stopped when one of Kit's Romanian informers, Gregory Vanescu, claims to have a big scoop for Kit.

Before he can tell Kit his story, he is shot at by Nazi spies and runs into hiding. Later Kit and Christina receive a message directing them to send stenographer, to the steps of the Lincoln Memorial at midnight that night. She must carry a red purse and a green umbrella. To get the required accessories, Kit asks Christina's roommate Sally Branch to grab the umbrella, the purse and Christina's notebook and to meet them right away at the Lincoln Memorial. Kit being Kit, mistakenly drives Christina to the Washington Monument instead.

Sally shows up at the rendezvous and is taken to Vanescu. When Vanescu sees Sally, expecting Christina, concedes that she will do. Sally's proficient at shorthand and transcribes the extensive information Vanescu has to offer. He outlines a spy organisation and their plans to perform terror attacks on the city by combined German, Italian and Japanese saboteurs.

Just as the meeting finishes, Nazi agents appear. During a chase and commotion, they grab the notebook from Sally. Realizing their mistake, Kit takes Christina home. They wait for Sally there together with her roommates and Sally's boyfriend, Red, who is a marine.

Sally soon returns and tells the others what happened. Meanwhile, the Nazi agents realize they can't interpret Sally's own system of shorthand. The Nazis come to Sally's apartment and "steal" her away. Christina wants them to call the FBI, but Kit is anxious to get his scoop and his job back, so he only pretends to call them.

Kit goes to look for Vanescu at a nightclub where he knows the man has been hiding before. There he finds a gypsy woman who shows him to a private room on the second floor, where two spies await - Olga and Otto Fauscheim. Olga poses as Vanescu's wife and persuades Kit to help her find her missing husband.

Olga tries to scare Kit off by leading him to an old house of an old delusional Civil War veteran, but Kit strokes the man the right way, and is instead able to discover Vanescu's dead body.

Otto decides they instead try to break Kit by ruining his reputation and career. They manage to drug Kit with a doped cigarette and when he is knocked out makes him marry one of the showgirls, Gloria the Glow Girl, at the night club.

The plan fails, as Christina realizes Kit has been set up. Kit has managed to keep a handkerchief from Olga, and Christina and her friends start tracing the perfume on it. Before Gloria can disclose the plan she was involved in to trick him, she is stabbed and killed by the spies. As she dies, Gloria hands her corsage to Kit. Kit finds the corsage box in Gloria's dressing room and breaks into the flower shop listed on it. In the flower shop, he is slugged by one of the spies.

Kit is quickly suspected of murdering Gloria. Christina finds out that the perfume on the handkerchief was purchased at a particular beauty salon, and she goes there to find clues. The salon is owned by the night club owner, and is next to the flower shop where Kit was headed before he disappeared. Christina suspects them of working with the spies.

It turns out Olga runs the salon, and she recognizes Christina from an addressed envelope she finds in Christina's purse. Kit is held hostage in another room at the salon, but manages to escape his bonds and frantically scampers around the salon. By accident he hears the Axis agents conversing in the showroom.

Kit hears all about the spy ring's plan to blow up the city. Kit takes on the agents and manages to hold them off until Christina's roommates, photogs and g-men barge-in, including Ted and his Marine buddies. The spies are defeated and the police arrive. Christina and Kit reunite in a kiss, and his friends discuss the possibility of another Pulitzer Prize because of this new scoop.

== Cast ==
- Bob Hope as Robert Kittredge
- Dorothy Lamour as Christina Hill
- Lenore Aubert as Mrs. Olga Venescu
- Otto Preminger as Otto Feischum
- Eduardo Ciannelli as Baldanacco
- Marion Martin as Gloria
- Donald Meek as Little Old Man
- Phyllis Ruth as Sally
- Philip Ahn as Nichimuro
- Donald MacBride as Mason
- Mary Treen as Helen
- Bettye Avery as Mildred
- Margaret Hayes as Lucille
- Mary Byrne as Laura
- William Yetter Sr. as Holtz (as William Yetter)
- Gino Corrado as Bartender at Cafe (uncredited)
- Bing Crosby as The Music Box (voice) (uncredited)
- Doris Day as Beautiful Girl in Sheet (uncredited)
- Arnold Stang as Drugstore Boy (uncredited)
- Wolfgang Zilzer as Cross (uncredited)

== Production ==
Paramount Pictures loaned their contract stars Bob Hope and Dorothy Lamour to Samuel Goldwyn Productions in exchange for Gary Cooper's appearance in 1942's Star Spangled Rhythm; a film in which Hope and Lamour also appeared. Goldwyn titled the film after Hope's then current best-selling autobiography. According to a September 1942 Hollywood Reporter article, the embassy of neutral Turkey requested that the name of the Axis spies' nightclub be changed from Cafe Istanbul to Cafe Moresque to avoid any connection to Turkey being an Axis power.

== Reception ==
Contemporary reviews were mixed. Bosley Crowther of The New York Times wrote that the film "doesn't quite measure up in plot or speed to some of Mr. Hope's previous excursions in melodramatic farce. It drags in some critical phases, it labors in obvious spots and the climax is too manufactured. But there are side-splitting moments in it and one dandy sequence, at least, in which Bob has a weird conversation with a murderous maniac played by Donald Meek." Variety wrote, "Sometimes it takes and sometimes it doesn't, but 'They Got Me Covered' as a whole is disappointing in light of past Goldwyniana and the talent that went into it ... Hope, in brief, has been shortchanged by the writers and though he succeeds in giving plenty of lift to the film, he hasn't been able to make a 100% solid laugh-fest out of it." Harrison's Reports declared, "Despite a good production, and hard work by the members of the cast, 'They Got Me Covered' never rises much above the level of fair entertainment." David Lardner of The New Yorker wrote that Hope's "gags are of his usual standard, which is reasonably high, and he continues to rattle them off as smoothly as anyone in that line of work."

A half-hour Screen Guild Players radio preview of the film, with Hope and Lamour reprising their roles, aired February 15, 1943, on CBS Radio.

=== Box office ===
According to RKO records, RKO lost $150,000 on the film.
