= Famous Jury Trials =

American court show

- Genre: Dramatized court show
- Starring: Joyce Randolph; James Bender; Truman Smith; Lenore Aubert
- Country of origin: United States

Production
- Running time: 30 minutes

Original release
- Network: DuMont
- Release: October 12, 1949 – March 12, 1952

Famous Jury Trials is an American dramatized court show that first appeared on radio, followed by television, and then in the movies. The series ran on radio from 1936 through 1949, then on television from 1949 through 1952, and finally in a movie in 1971. On television, it aired on the DuMont Television Network. Episodes re-enacted historic actual court cases.

== Broadcast history ==
Famous Jury Trials first aired on October 12, 1949, on DuMont, and was a live dramatized court show with each episode lasting 30 minutes. During the first season, the show aired Wednesdays at 9:30pm EST. During later seasons, the show aired Wednesdays at 9pm EST. The final show aired March 12, 1952.

== Production ==
Frank Bunetta and C. Harrell were the directors, and John L. Clark was the writer. The program originated from WABD and was sponsored by Chevrolet Dealers. Four sets in the Adelphi Theater were used for broadcasts. The main set, a replica of a courtroom, was surrounded by three sets used for flashback scenes. While a witness testified, the televised scene shifted to one of the side sets to portray the actions that the witness was relating.

== Episodes ==
- June 4, 1950 - "People vs. William Tait" - Lenore Aubert, Lynn Salisbury
- July 9, 1950 - "The People vs. Jack Pelt"
- July 16, 1950 - "State vs. William Townsend"

== Episode status ==
No episodes are confirmed to survive, however an episode may possibly exist at the Paley Center for Media.

== See also ==
- Famous Jury Trials (radio program)
- List of programs broadcast by the DuMont Television Network
- List of surviving DuMont Television Network broadcasts

== Bibliography ==
- David Weinstein, The Forgotten Network: DuMont and the Birth of American Television (Philadelphia: Temple University Press, 2004) ISBN 1-59213-245-6
- Alex McNeil, Total Television, Fourth edition (New York: Penguin Books, 1980) ISBN 0-14-024916-8
- Tim Brooks and Earle Marsh, The Complete Directory to Prime Time Network TV Shows, Third edition (New York: Ballantine Books, 1964) ISBN 0-345-31864-1
