= Famous Jury Trials (radio program) =

American radio court series (1936–1949)

- Genre: Dramatic anthology
- Running time: 45 minutes
- Country of origin: United States
- Language: English
- Home station: WLW
- Syndicates: Mutual; NBC Blue/ABC
- TV adaptations: Dumont
- Starring: Maurice Franklin
- Announcer: Peter Grant; Roger Krupp; Hugh James
- Created by: Ed Byron
- Written by: Don Becker; Milton J. Kramer; John Hunter Lay; Jerry McGill; Stedman Coles; Bill Rafael; Ameel Fisher; Len Finger; Martin H. Young; Daisy Armoury; Joseph L. Greene; Lawrence Menkin; Paul Monash
- Directed by: Carl Andrews; Carl Eastman; Wylie Adams; Robert H. Nolan; John Hunter Lay; Charles Powers
- Produced by: Don Becker; John Clark; J. Ralph Corbett
- Narrated by: Roger DeKoven; Dewitt McBride
- Original release: January 5, 1936 – June 25, 1949

Famous Jury Trials is a radio court show/dramatic anthology series in the United States. It began on January 5, 1936, and ended June 25, 1949. It is considered one of the first programs that initiated the court show genre, which later was broadcast on television as Famous Jury Trials.

== Format ==
Famous Jury Trials took a listener into an actual courtroom so that he or she could hear a trial as it proceeded. At the beginning of each episode, the judge was heard as he instructed the jury, "Be just and fear not, for the true administration of justice is the foundation of good government." The show's set was designed as a courtroom, including a jury box containing 12 jurors and a judge clad in a black robe. The judge sat on a high bench with the witness chair to his left and the clerk at a desk in front. Adding to the effect of realism for listeners, the program was "delivered flat, without music."

As the title implies, the program re-enacted trials from history. Although the scripts were described by radio historian John Dunning as "almost entirely fictionalized," they resulted from thorough research. A 1942 newspaper article noted, "The legal fireworks are checked for scriptural realism" by attorney and law historian Martin H. Young. Among the well-known trials featured were those of Captain Kidd, Benedict Arnold, and Aaron Burr. A 1937 review of the program said, "[I]t carries the morbid interest and suspense that is characteristic of such melodramas."

Famous Jury Trials introduced the device of having a reporter provide an account of an event from history, a technique that a review in Radio Mirror magazine called one of the program's "novel devices." The technique was used 15 years later in You Are There.

== Characters and cast ==
As an anthology series, Famous Jury Trials had few regular cast members. Maurice Franklin starred as the judge. Roger DeKoven and DeWitt McBride were reporter-narrators.

== Broadcast history ==
Famous Jury Trials originated at WLW in Cincinnati. It was created by Ed Byron, a staff writer at the station. As of September 27, 1937, it was also being carried by WOR in New York City and WGN in Chicago. The program was also heard on WFIL in Philadelphia and KWK in St. Louis, identified as "stations of the WLW line." By 1938, the program was being broadcast from New York City.

A summary of Famous Jury Trials's time on network radio is provided in the following table:

Starting date	Ending date	Network	Sponsor
January 5, 1936	December 20, 1937	Mutual	Mennen
November 2, 1938	March 8, 1939	Mutual	B.F. Goodrich
November 11, 1940	June 25, 1949	NBC Blue/ABC*	Oh Henry! (1940–46); General Mills (1947–48)

Source: On the Air

- Note: NBC Blue became ABC in October 1943.

Famous Jury Trials was among a group of old-time radio programs that regained popularity in the 1960s. A news brief in Broadcasting magazine in 1963 reported that a "Mystery Package," which also included The Shadow, Green Hornet, Sherlock Holmes and Dangerous Assignment had been sold for 52 weeks to stations in 20 of the top 25 markets. Within a year, the popularity for all but Dangerous Assignment had increased even more. An ad for "The 4 Biggest Mysteries in the U.S." indicated that Famous Jury Trials and the other three were carried on 125 stations.

A version of Famous Jury Trials was broadcast in Australia in the 1950s. It was described in a newspaper article as "worthy of special recommendation."
