= Angel in Exile =

1948 film by Allan Dwan

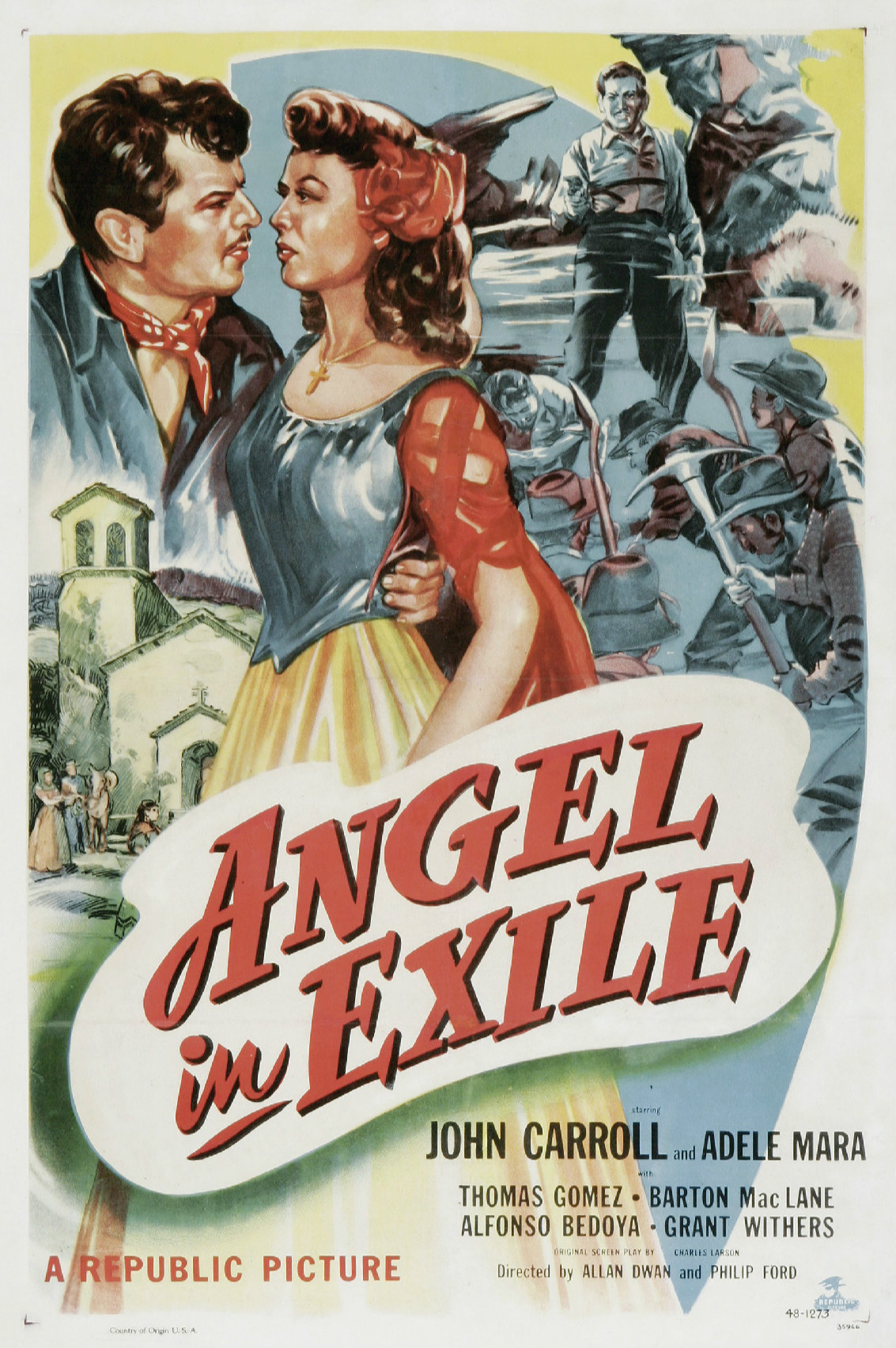
- Theatrical release poster
- Directed by: Allan Dwan; Philip Ford
- Screenplay by: Charles Larson
- Produced by: Allan Dwan
- Starring: John Carroll; Adele Mara; Thomas Gomez; Barton MacLane
- Cinematography: Reggie Lanning
- Edited by: Arthur Roberts
- Music by: Nathan Scott
- Production company: Republic Pictures
- Distributed by: Republic Pictures
- Release date: September 3, 1948
- Running time: 90 minutes
- Country: United States
- Language: English

Angel in Exile is a 1948 American Western film directed by Allan Dwan and Philip Ford and starring John Carroll, Adele Mara, Thomas Gomez, Barton MacLane. The film was released on September 3, 1948, by Republic Pictures. It was one of the more high-budget films from a studio that generally concentrated on B movies. Co-director Dwan was an industry veteran whose career stretched back into the silent era.

== Synopsis ==
An outlaw is released from jail and plans to head to Arizona where he has stashed a fortune in gold from his last robbery. He is trailed on his journey by fellow criminals who hope he will lead them to the haul. However, on arriving in a small town and begins to believe that the proceeds should be given to benefit the poor Mexican villagers.

== Cast ==
- John Carroll as Charlie Dakin
- Adele Mara as Raquel Chavez
- Thomas Gomez as Dr. Estaban Chavez
- Barton MacLane as Max Giorgio
- Alfonso Bedoya as Ysidro Álvarez
- Grant Withers as Sheriff
- Paul Fix as Carl Spitz
- Art Smith as Emie Coons
- Tom Powers as Warden
- Ian Wolfe as Health Officer
- Howland Chamberlain as J. H. Higgins
- Elsa Lorraine Zepeda as Carmencita
- Mary Currier as Nurse

== Bibliography ==
- Fetrow, Alan G. Feature Films, 1940-1949: a United States Filmography. McFarland, 1994.
