= Girls of the Big House =

1945 film

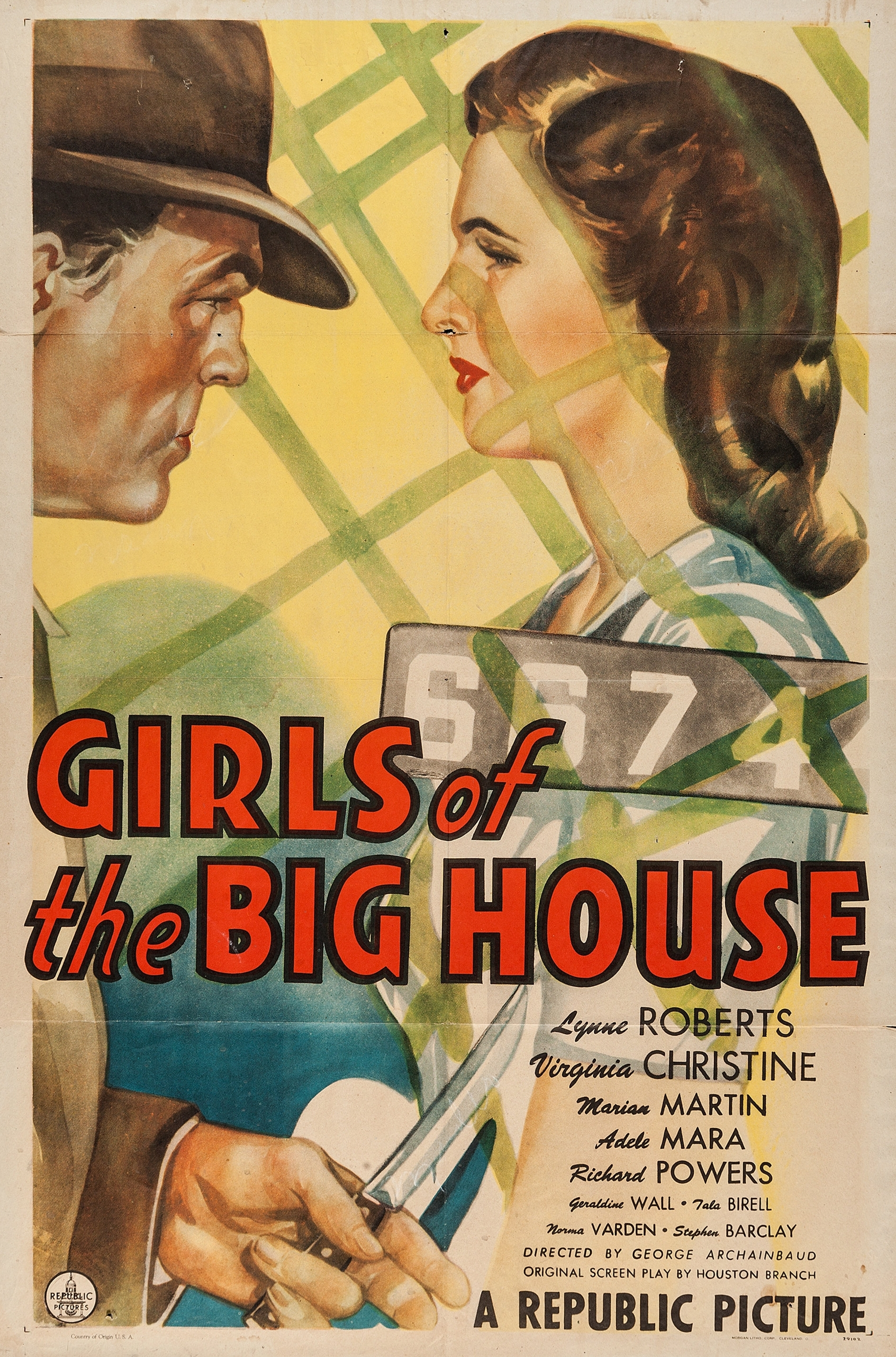
- Theatrical Release Poster
- Directed by: George Archainbaud
- Written by: Houston Branch
- Produced by: Herman Millakowsky; Rudolph E. Abel
- Starring: Lynne Roberts; Virginia Christine; Marion Martin
- Cinematography: John Alton
- Edited by: Arthur Roberts
- Music by: Joseph Dubin
- Production company: Republic Pictures
- Distributed by: Republic Pictures
- Release date: November 2, 1945
- Running time: 68 minutes
- Country: United States
- Language: English

Girls of the Big House is a 1945 American drama film directed by George Archainbaud and starring Lynne Roberts, Virginia Christine and Marion Martin.

The film's sets were designed by the art director Gano Chittenden.

== Plot ==
A college professor's daughter is convicted of a crime she didn't commit. Under an assumed name, Jeanne Crail, she is imprisoned with inmates including Bernice Meyers, who misses her boyfriend Smiley, and the condemned Alma Vlasek, who killed a policeman while waiting to ambush her cheating husband and his mistress.

Jeanne breaks out of jail to go see her sweetheart, lawyer Bart Sturgis. When her man Smiley visits prison, Bernice is infuriated by his attraction to Jeanne and attacks her with a knife. Jeanne ends up in solitary confinement. Alma, finally realizing who her husband's secret lover was, murders Bernice in the prison. Bart's efforts help clear Jeanne's name and win her release.

== Cast ==
- Lynne Roberts as Jeanne Crail
- Virginia Christine as Bernice Meyers
- Marion Martin as Dixie
- Adele Mara as Harriet
- Tom Keene as Barton Sturgis
- Geraldine Wall as Head Matron Marsden
- Tala Birell as Alma Vlasek
- Norma Varden as Mrs. Thelma Holt
- Mary Newton as Dr. Gale Warren
- Steve Barclay as Smiley Gordon
- Erskine Sanford as Professor O'Neill
- Sarah Edwards as Dormitory Matron
- Ida Moore as 'Mother' Fielding
- William Forrest as District Attorney
- Verna Felton as Agnes
- George Reynolds as Earl Williams
- Dick Elliott as Felton
- Hella Crossley as Mae
- Kathryn Sheldon as Kitchen Warden
- Isabel Withers as Alma's Cell Warden
- Gertrude Astor as Railroad Matron
- Roy Barcroft as Police Dispatcher (voice)
- Barbara Bedford as Visitors' Matron
- Barry Bernard as Scholar
- Symona Boniface as Matron
- Grace Cunard as Medical Trustee
- Edythe Elliott as Postmistress
- Dorothy Granger as Woman Clerk
- John Ince as Pompous Man
- Marjorie Kane as Inmate
- Elaine Lange as Mabel
- Tom London as Sheriff at Alma's Cell
- Mary McCarty as Inmate
- Anne O'Neal as Bart's Secretary
- Florence Pepper as Clerk
- Lee Phelps as Detective Benson
- Mary Rockwell as Laundry Matron
- Marin Sais as Foyer Matron
- Walter Shumway as Policeman
- Lee Slater as Yell Leader
- Sheila Stewart as Trustee-Clerk
- Brick Sullivan as Deputy Sheriff
- Charles Sullivan as Waiter
- Rean Tibeau as The Little Stoolie

== Bibliography ==
- Vincent LoBrutto. The Encyclopedia of American Independent Filmmaking. Greenwood Press, 2002.
