= Tom Powers =

American actor (1890–1955)

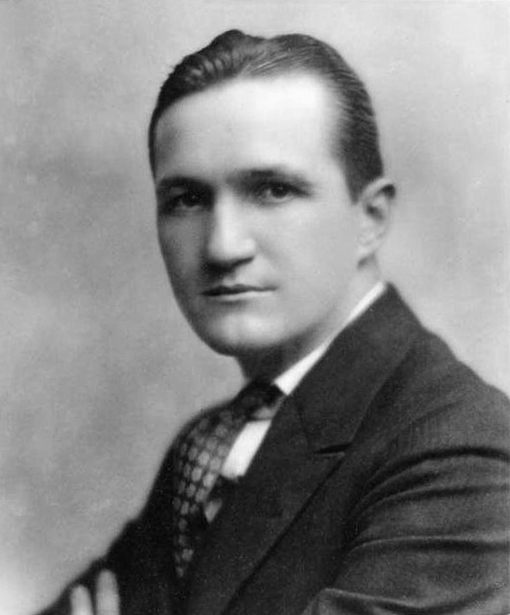
- Powers in 1922
- Born: Thomas McCreery Powers; July 7, 1890; Owensboro, Kentucky, U.S.
- Died: November 9, 1955 (aged 65); Manhattan Beach, California, U.S.
- Occupation: Actor
- Years active: 1911–1955
- Spouse: Meta Murray Janney (m. 1929)

Thomas McCreery Powers (July 7, 1890 – November 9, 1955) was an American actor in theatre, films, radio and television. A veteran of the Broadway stage, notably in plays by George Bernard Shaw, he created the role of Charles Marsden in Eugene O'Neill's Strange Interlude. He succeeded Orson Welles in the role of Brutus in the Mercury Theatre's debut production, Caesar. In films, he was a star of Vitagraph Pictures and later became best known for his role as the victim of scheming wife Barbara Stanwyck and crooked insurance salesman Fred MacMurray in the film noir classic Double Indemnity (1944).

== Career ==
Powers with Beatrice Lillie (1919)

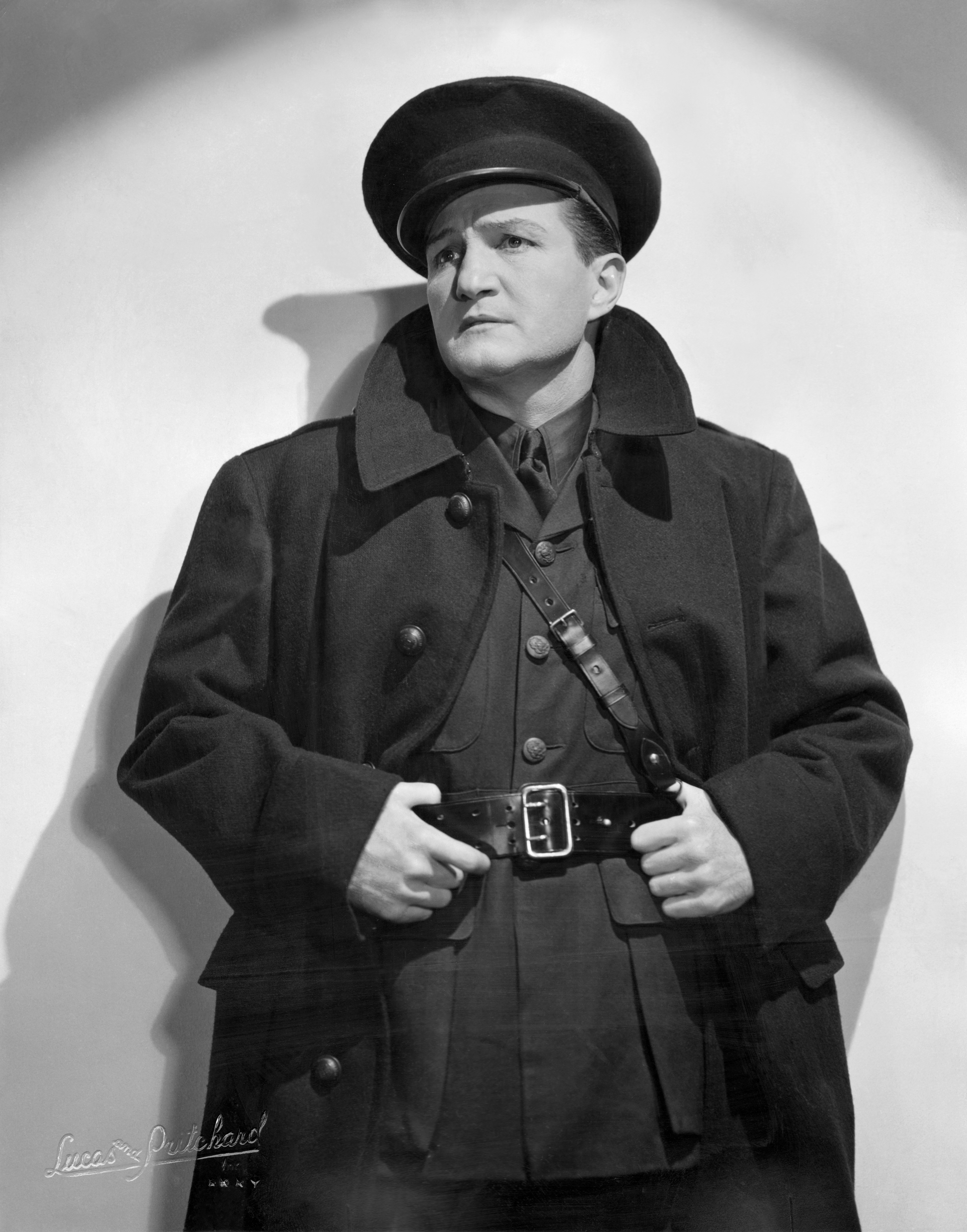
Powers played Brutus in the Mercury Theatre's national touring production of Caesar, then succeeded Orson Welles in the Broadway production (1938).

Thomas McCreery Powers was born in 1890 in Owensboro, Kentucky. His father, Colonel Joshua D. Powers, was a banker; his uncle was sculptor Hiram Powers. Tom Powers' mother loved the theatre and enrolled him at ballet school at age three. He entered the American Academy of Dramatic Arts at age 16, and he studied drama, wrote and produced plays, and practiced stage design in a small theatre in the attic of his home. Powers apprenticed to a pantomime troupe for ten years and became a star of Vitagraph Westerns.

Powers appeared in over 70 silent films from 1911 to 1917 opposite such actors as Florence Turner, Harry T. Morey, Clara Kimball Young, Alma Taylor and John Bunny.

Powers had great success in his first Broadway appearance, as William Booth in Mr. Lazarus (1916). He became a star in musical comedies, and won acclaim as a leading player and character actor. For the summer of 1925, Powers was the leading man at Elitch Theatre. His best-known roles included Gregers Werle in The Wild Duck, the captain in Androcles and the Lion, and Bluntschli in Arms and the Man — all in 1925 — and King Magnus in The Apple Cart (1930). He created the role of Charles Marsden in Eugene O'Neill's long-running drama, Strange Interlude (1928–29). In 1938 he succeeded Orson Welles as Brutus in the Mercury Theatre's debut stage production, Caesar, and in 1941 he toured nationwide in The Man Who Came to Dinner. His last significant Broadway role was in Three Sisters (1942), with Judith Anderson, Katharine Cornell and Ruth Gordon.

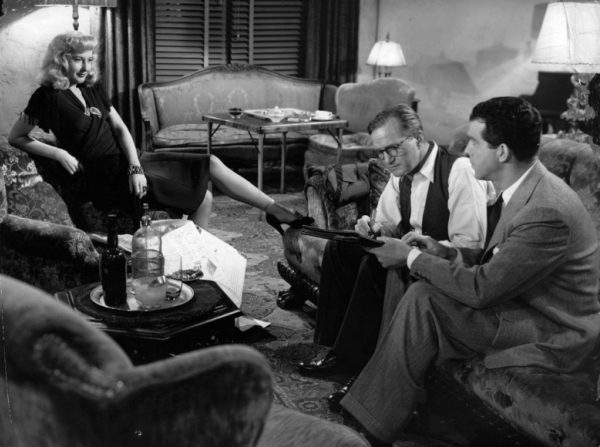
Powers with Barbara Stanwyck and Fred MacMurray in Double Indemnity (1944)

His radio credits include Tom Powers' Life Studies (1935–36), a 15-minute series consisting of true-life stories broadcast on NBC. Powers published two books of monologues, Life Studies (1939) and More Life Studies (1940). He also wrote four plays and two romantic novels, Virgin with Butterflies (1945) and Sheba on Trampled Grass (1946).

Powers moved to the West Coast after becoming ill with arthritis, and became a full-time movie actor when Billy Wilder invited him to play the murder victim in the 1944 film noir classic, Double Indemnity. For the next dozen years or so, Powers appeared in over 80 film and television roles, usually playing middle-aged business men, military or police officers. His performance as Metallus Cimber in Julius Caesar (1953) is regarded as Powers' best during his Hollywood years.

== Personal life ==
Tom Powers was married to Meta Murray Janney of Philadelphia on September 7, 1929. Powers died of heart disease at his home in Manhattan Beach, California, on November 9, 1955, at age 65.

He was interred in Pierce Brothers Valhalla Memorial Park, in North Hollywood, California.

== Filmography ==
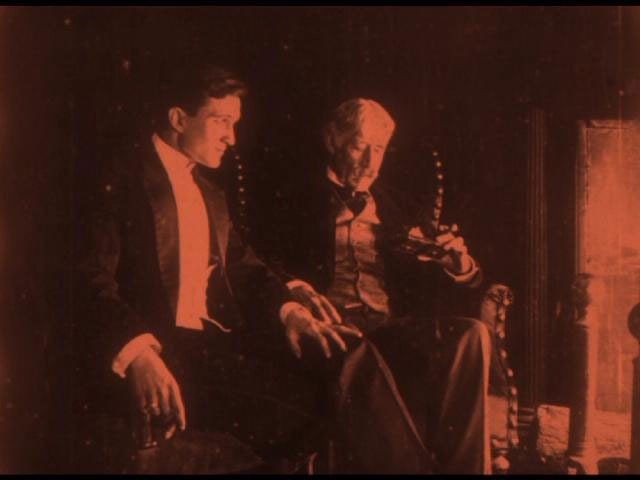
Powers and Charles Kent in A Window on Washington Park (1913)

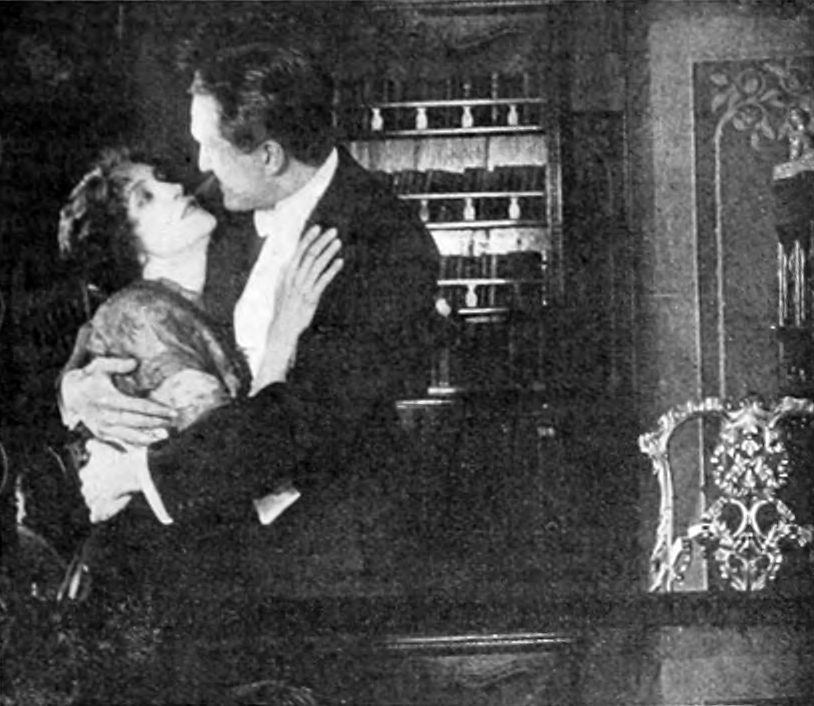
Florence Turner and Powers in As Ye Repent (1915), retitled Redeemed for US distribution

=== Film ===
Year	Title	Role	Notes
1911	The Sheriff's Friend	Sheriff Joe Cooper	Short
1911	A Western Heroine		Short
1911	The Girl and the Sheriff	The Mountain Boy	Short
1911	The Half-Breed's Daughter	Luke Lansing - a Gold Miner	Short
1911	The Black Chasm	Yellow Eagle	Short
1912	A Girl of the West	Jones - the Ranch Owner	Short
1912	The Heart of a Man	Tom Hunter	Short
1912	A Cure for Pokeritis	Freddie's Chum	Short
1912	A Story of the Circus	Kenneth, The Boy's father	Short
1912	The Great Diamond Robbery	D'ahseen - First Detective	Short
1912	The Haunted Rocker	Jack Farnum - Madge's Suitor	Short
1912	The Illumination	Giuseppe	Short
1912	The Hieroglyphic	Tom Swayne	Short
1912	Love in the Ghetto	Sammy Bertram - Rebecca's Sweetheart	Short
1912	Fortunes of a Composer	Opera Attendee (uncredited)	Short
1912	The Picture Idol	Beth's Sweetheart	Short
1912	An Eventful Elopement	Charley Fortune - Mabel's Sweetheart	Short
1912	The Cylinder's Secret	Richard Johns, Howard's Son	Short
1912	Saving an Audience	John	Short
1912	The Face or the Voice	Robert's Friend	Short
1912	Susie to Susanne	John - Susie's Sweetheart	Short
1912	The Signal of Distress	George Gordon	Short
1912	While She Powdered Her Nose	Abner Waite	Short
1913	Stenographer Troubles	Office Employee	Short
1913	Under the Make-Up	Pierrot	Short
1913	Sisters All		Short
1913	The House in Suburbia	John Doane	Short
1913	Checkmated	Cecil Wray	Short
1913	Let 'Em Quarrel	Powell - the Husband	Short
1913	A Window on Washington Park	The Young Millionaire	Short
1913	Counsellor Bobby	Dr. Randall - Jenny's Sweetheart	Short
1913	Cutey Plays Detective	The Pal	Short
1914	Gertie the Dinosaur	Clumsy Copy Boy (uncredited)	Short
1914	Creatures of Habit	Tom	Short
1914	Judged by Appearances	Ralph Bellamy	Short
1914	Flotilla the Flirt	Tompasso	Short
1914	Daisy Doodad's Dial	Husband	Short
1914	Over the Garden Wall	Billy Birch	Short
1914	The Terror of the Air	Roger Doubleday	Short
1914	Dr. Fenton's Ordeal	Rupert Harding	Short
1914	The Schemers: or, The Jewels of Hate	James Mortimer	Short
1914	The Hunchback	Tom	Short
1914	Lucky Jim	Jim Brown	Short
1914	Unfit; or, The Strength of the Weak	Ned Osborne	Short
1914	The Hills Are Calling	Donald	Short
1914	Memory	Paolo	Short
1914	Cinder-Elfred	Elfred	Short
1914	The Unseen Witness	Brian Foster	Short
1914	In the Shadow of Big Ben	Harry Forrest	Short
1914	Time the Great Healer	Dick / Harry	Short
1914	The Pet of the Regiment	Tommy Atkins	Short
1914	Morphia the Death Drug	The Boy	Short
1914	Aladdin: or, a Lad Out	The Lad	Short
1914	The Basilisk	Eric Larne, the Fiancé	Short
1914	Oh My Aunt!	Suitor	Short
1914	Life's Dark Road	The Lover	Short
1914	His Great Opportunity	Understudy	Short
1915	The Painted Lady Betty	Jack	Short
1915	Be Sure Your Sins	Leo Garth	Short
1915	Barnaby Rudge	Barnaby Rudge	
1915	A Lancashire Lass	Howard	Short
1915	As Ye Repent	Harry Somers	Retitled Redeemed for US distribution
1915	The Traitor	Lieutenant Shaw	Short
1915	The Passing of a Soul	The Son	Short
1916	Love in a Mist	The Fiancee	Short
1917	The Auction Block	Bob Wharton	
1944	Double Indemnity	Mr. Dietrichson	
1944	Practically Yours	Commander Harry Harpe	
1945	The Phantom Speaks	Harvey Bogardus	
1945	The Chicago Kid	Mike Thurber	
1946	Two Years Before the Mast	Bellamer	
1946	The Blue Dahlia	Captain Hendrickson	
1946	Her Adventurous Night	Dan Carter	
1946	The Last Crooked Mile	Floyd Sorelson	
1947	Angel and the Badman	Dr. Mangram	
1947	The Farmer's Daughter	Hy Nordick	
1947	For the Love of Rusty	Hugh Mitchell	
1947	They Won't Believe Me	Trenton	
1947	The Son of Rusty	Hugh Mitchell	
1948	I Love Trouble	Ralph Johnson	
1948	Up in Central Park	Rogan	
1948	The Time of Your Life	Freddy Blick (a stool pigeon and frame-up artist)	
1948	The Velvet Touch	Detective	Uncredited
1948	Angel in Exile	Prison Warden	
1948	Station West	Captain Iles	
1948	Mexican Hayride	Ed Mason	
1949	Special Agent	Chief Special Agent Wilcox	
1949	Scene of the Crime	Umpire Menafoe	
1949	Chicago Deadline	Glenn Howard	
1949	Chinatown at Midnight	Captain Howard Brown	
1949	East Side, West Side	Owen Lee	
1950	The Nevadan	Bill Martin	
1950	Destination Moon	General Thayer	
1950	Right Cross	Tom Balford	
1950	Again Pioneers	Ken Keeler	
1951	Fighting Coast Guard	Admiral Ryan	
1951	The Tall Target	Simon G. Stroud	Uncredited
1951	The Strip	Lieutenant Detective Bonnabel	
1951	The Well	Mayor	
1952	Phone Call from a Stranger	Dr. Fernwood	Uncredited
1952	Flesh and Fury	Andy Randolph	
1952	Deadline - U.S.A.	Andrew Wharton	Uncredited
1952	The Fabulous Senorita	Delaney	
1952	Jet Job	Oscar Collins	
1952	Denver and Rio Grande	Sloan	
1952	Bal Tabarin	Eddie Mendies	
1952	Diplomatic Courier	Cherney	Uncredited
1952	We're Not Married	Attorney General Frank Bush	Uncredited
1952	Horizons West	Frank Tarleton	
1952	The WAC from Walla Walla	General	Uncredited
1952	The Steel Trap	Valcourt, Travel Agent	
1952	Government is Your Business		Short
1953	The Marksman	Lieutenant Governor Watson	
1953	Scared Stiff	Police Lieutenant	Uncredited
1953	Julius Caesar	Metellus Cimber	
1953	Hannah Lee: An American Primitive	Sheriff	
1953	The Last Posse	Frank White	
1953	I, the Jury	Milt Miller	
1953	Devil's Canyon	Joe Holbert	Uncredited
1953	Donovan's Brain	Donovan's Washington Advisor	
1953	Sea of Lost Ships	Rear Admiral	
1954	The Mad Magician	Inspector	Uncredited
1954	Lucky Me	Thayer Crony	Uncredited
1955	The Americano	Jim Rogers	
1955	Ten Wanted Men	Henry Green	
1955	New York Confidential	District Attorney Rossi	Uncredited
1955	The Eternal Sea	General	Uncredited
1955	Double Jeopardy	Harry Sheldon	
1955	The Gentle Warrior	Dr. Howe	Short
1956	The Go-Getter	Miller's Business Partner	

=== Television ===
Year	Title	Role	Notes
1951	The Lone Ranger	Marshal Lindon	Season 2 Episode 23: "Two Gold Lockets"
1951	Stars Over Hollywood		Episode: "Never Laugh at a Lady"
1951–1955	Fireside Theatre	Paton / Barney Ringo / Simon Thor / Payson	8 episodes
1952	Racket Squad		Season 2 Episode 37: "One for the Books"
1952	Your Jeweler's Showcase		2 episodes
1953	Hollywood Opening Night		Season 2 Episode 17: "Mrs. Genius"
1953	I'm the Law		Season 1 Episode 5: "The McClury Brothers Story"
1953	The Adventures of Ozzie and Harriet	Mr. Hopkins	Season 2 Episode 7: "No Noise"
1953–1955	Lux Video Theatre	Mr. Marshall / Minister / Judge / Dr. Franco	4 episodes
1954	Adventures of Superman	Railroad Official	Season 2 Episode 20: "Beware the Wrecker"
1954	Meet Mr. McNutley		Season 1 Episode 25: "The Egg and Ray"
1954	General Electric Theater	Stark	Season 2 Episode 21: "Exit for Margo"
1954	Mayor of the Town	Jacobs	4 episodes
1954–1955	The Lone Wolf	Carl Olsen / Tom Steele	2 episodes
1955	The Halls of Ivy		Season 1 Episode 12: "Pinkerton Day"
1955	Climax!		2 episodes
1955	Big Town	Hampton Norris	2 episodes
1955	Four Star Playhouse	General Vincent	Season 4 Episode 1: "The Firing Squad"
1956	The 20th Century-Fox Hour	Dr. Fernwood	Season 1 Episode 10: "Crack-Up"
1956	Cavalcade of America	Wilkeson	Season 4 Episode 23: "Who Is Byington?"
1957	Panic!	Warden	Season 1 Episode 2: "The Prisoner"
1957	The Christophers	Dr. Howe	Episode: "Gentle Warrior"
