= Ann Savage =

American actress (1921–2008)

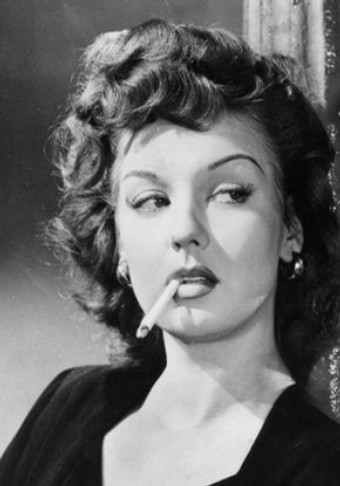
- Savage in Detour (1945)
- Born: Berniece Maxine Lyon; February 19, 1921; Columbia, South Carolina, U.S.
- Died: December 25, 2008 (aged 87); Hollywood, California, U.S.
- Resting place: Hollywood Forever Cemetery
- Occupation: Actress
- Years active: 1943–2007
- Spouses: Clark Bewley Tennyson (m. 1938; div. 1941) Douglas Worthington (m. 1944; div. 1945) Bert D'Armand (m. 1946; died 1969)

Play full film; runtime 01:07:59.

Ann Savage (born Berniece Maxine Lyon, February 19, 1921 – December 25, 2008) was an American film and television actress. She is best remembered as the greedy cigarette-puffing femme fatale in the critically acclaimed film noir Detour (1945). She was featured in more than 20 B movies between 1943 and 1946.

Effectively leaving the film business in the mid 1950s, Savage made occasional appearances on television and worked for industrial and inspirational film producers from the 1950s to the 1970s. She made a number of live appearances at film festivals, especially for screenings of Detour.

In 2007 she was cast by director Guy Maddin as his mother in My Winnipeg, "a part that had been tipped to bring her an Academy Award and which introduced her to a legion of new fans".

== Early life ==
Ann Savage was born Berniece Maxine Lyon in Columbia, South Carolina. During her early years, her family moved often as her father, an officer in the United States Army, relocated from base to base. After he died when Berniece was four years old, her mother moved the two of them to Los Angeles. Growing up around the corner from the Jewelry District, the Broadway movie palaces of downtown Los Angeles served as her babysitter while her mother worked selling jewelry.

She attended 64th Street Grammar School and Mount Vernon Junior High and first stepped on a sound stage at the age of 17 at MGM Studios to be screen tested by Edgar Selwyn. Ann spent time among the more famous Hollywood kids of the day, such as Lana Turner, Judy Garland, Freddie Bartholomew, and Deanna Durbin.

Berniece's MGM test did not work out, prompting her to get her teeth capped and acquire theatre training at the Max Reinhardt workshop on Sunset Boulevard. Reinhardt oversaw her name change, and Berniece became Ann Savage.

The Reinhardt school's manager, Bert D'Armand, became Savage's agent, and the two later married. Savage was offered a screen test by Fox, but she decided not to turn up, as she knew the studio already had a bevy of pretty blondes.

== Career ==
=== 1940s ===
Savage instead made a screen test with Columbia Pictures—after playing Lorna in a Reinhardt acting showcase of Odet's Golden Boy"—and was offered a contract. Recalling Columbia mogul Harry Cohn as "a friendly Uncle type", Savage remembered Cohn being intimidated by acid-tongued Rosalind Russell. The two actresses featured together in What a Woman!, one of a dozen films with Savage released in 1943.

Although Columbia typically groomed its girls in the mold of Rita Hayworth, Savage's look echoed Ann Sheridan, although her customary blonde locks were reddened for Footlight Glamour (1943) "so that the star, Penny Singleton, would be the only blonde on screen." She joined Joan Davis and Jinx Falkenburg in Two Senoritas from Chicago (1943) and starred (as a brunette) in the first of several outings with Tom Neal in Klondike Kate (1943). At this time, during World War II, Savage was also a popular pin-up model, including posing for a centerfold in Esquire shot by George Hurrell. She was a tireless seller of war bonds on two nationwide drives coordinated by Hollywood studios with the United States government.

==== Detour (1945) ====
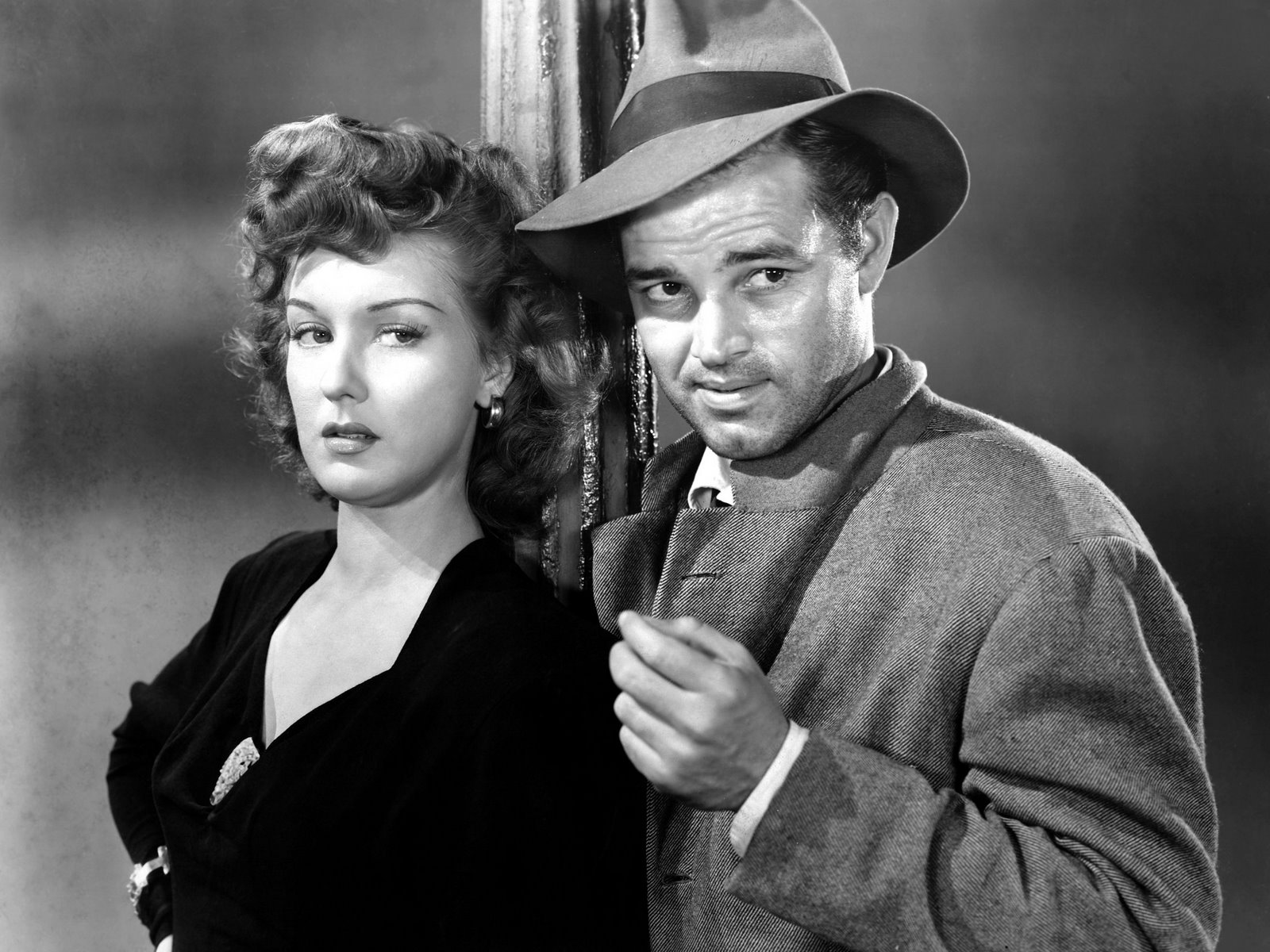
Savage and Tom Neal in a publicity still for Detour

Although Savage and Neal did not see eye-to-eye (she found him "childlike"), the duo would star together in Two Man Submarine and The Unwritten Code (both 1944) before their most famous film, the 1945 film noir Detour. Reminiscing in the 1980s about her career as a stalwart actress in B movies, Savage dismissed most of her roles as "mindless", saying: "The actresses were just scenery. The stories all revolved around the male actors; they really had the choice roles. All the actresses had to do was to look lovely, since the dialogue was ridiculous". Detour, she felt, was different. The two leads underwent role reversal, with Savage's Vera blackmailing Neal's Al, in a style described by her manager Kent Adamson as "vicious and predatory... very sexually aggressive".

Although the B-feature was shot quickly in 28 days, its status has been cemented over the years. Director Wim Wenders called her work "at least 15 years ahead of its time", and The Guardian termed Ann "a Garbo for our times". More recently, critics such as Derek Malcolm and Barry Norman have praised the film, with Norman calling Savage "sultry and sexy... a feline film noir star at its finest". After Detour, although Savage starred in a half-dozen more films during the later 1940s—including Scared Stiff (1945), The Spider (1945), The Dark Horse (1946), and Satan's Cradle (1949; a rare western)—her most prolific years were behind her.

When Detour entered the public domain, it frequently was syndicated on television channels and released in numerous VHS incarnations. Gaining cult status and garnering critical acclaim as "arguably film noir's greatest low-budget feature", this exposure earned Savage a new, younger following. From the 1980s, Savage also attended a number of film festivals, helping to bolster her personal status and leading her to emerge once more as "a glamorous figure-about-Hollywood at film festivals and galas".

In 1983, she attended a screening of Detour held as a tribute to director Edgar Ulmer with Ulmer's widow Shirley.

=== 1950s ===
During the early 1950s, Savage began working in television and found that she liked performing in anthology drama series, such as Fireside Theatre, Schlitz Playhouse of Stars, and The Ford Television Theatre. She also guest-starred in episodes of Front Page Detective, Gang Busters, City Detective, and Death Valley Days (The Pioneers). She continued, however, to act on the big screen as well, including in Allan Dwan's Woman They Almost Lynched (1953) with Audrey Totter, Joan Leslie and John Lund. As offers for additional movie and television roles began to dwindle, Savage started appearing in commercials and industrial films before essentially withdrawing from acting by the mid 1950s.

== Personal life ==
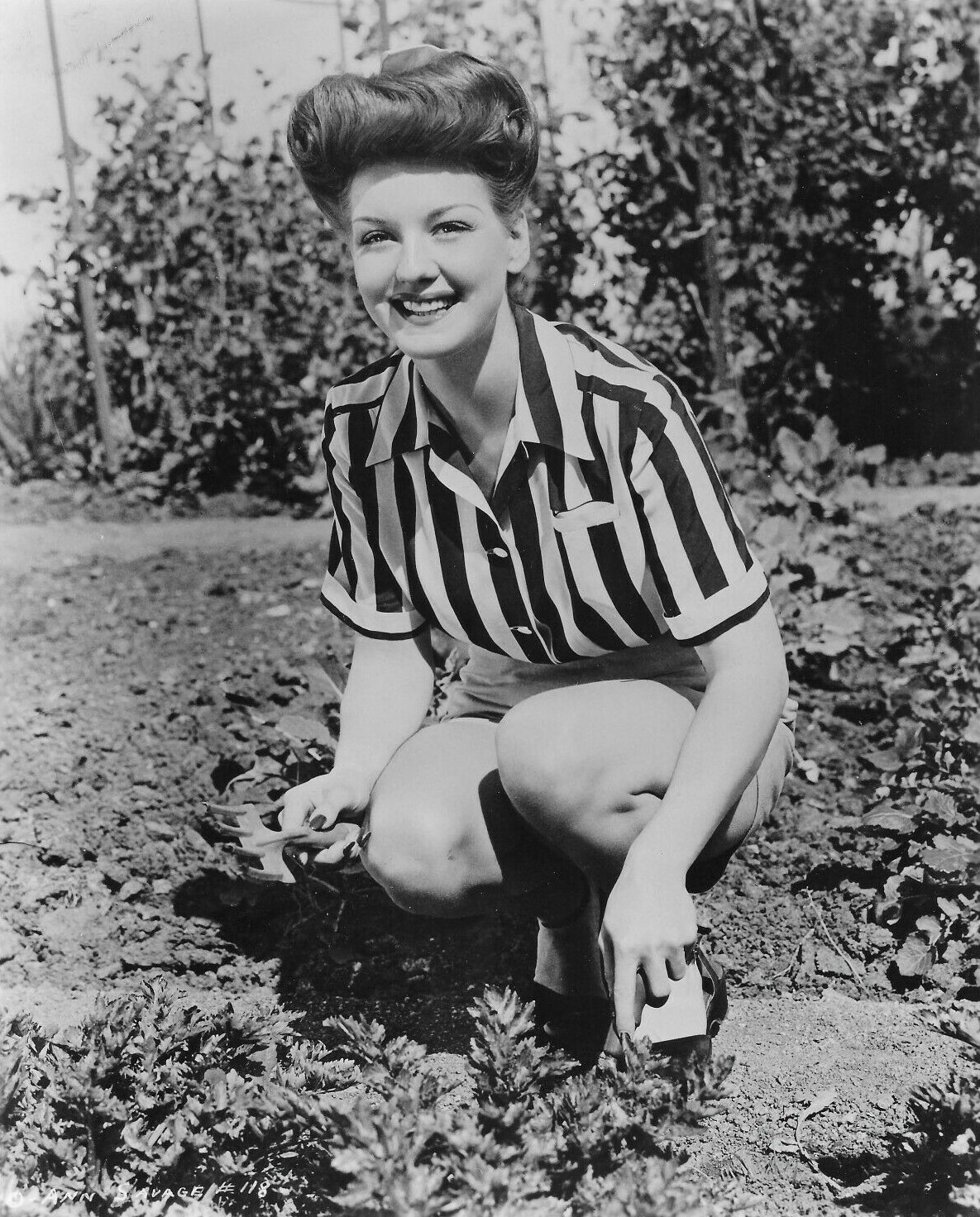
Savage in 1944

In Los Angeles in July 1938, while still using her birth name Berniece Lyon, Savage married a 21-year-old gas station attendant, Clark Tennyson. The couple divorced three years later. After a second, even briefer marriage to Douglas Worthington from 1944 to 1945, she married her agent Bert D'Armand in January 1946. D'Armand, who was 18 years older than Savage, proved to be a stabilizing influence on the actress's life. The two left California in the mid 1950s, moving to Manhattan and later, before Bert's death in 1969, splitting their time between New York and Florida.

After Bert's death, Savage returned to Los Angeles to be near her mother. There she took odd jobs to finance flying lessons, becoming a licensed pilot in 1979. Her manager quoted her as saying that she loved flying because it put her "closer to God and Bert". She also became part-owner of a small tool company and later took a secretarial course and became a docket clerk receptionist and then a secretary at the law firm Loeb & Loeb in Los Angeles.

Savage was keen on the "preservation and celebration of all things Hollywood", becoming a volunteer and advisory board member of Hollywood Heritage.

== Later years ==
Savage's exposure and the praise heaped on Detour led to her appearing in the 1986 film Fire with Fire and in a guest role on the television show Saved by the Bell.

=== My Winnipeg ===
In 2007, she enjoyed a comeback, and rave reviews, when Canadian filmmaker Guy Maddin cast her as his mother in his My Winnipeg (2008), a "personal portrait of his hometown". Maddin, according to Savage's manager, is a fan of Detour, and Savage's role in his film—"a part that had been tipped to bring her an Academy Award"—also "introduced her to a legion of new fans, including Steven Spielberg, John Travolta, and Martin Scorsese". Maddin has stated that he cast Savage because she "would have scared the pants off Bette Davis". My Winnipeg was critically acclaimed and won prizes from both the Toronto Film Critics Association and the San Francisco Film Critics Circle as well as the Best Canadian Feature Film at the Toronto International Film Festival and a Genie Award nomination.

== Death ==
Remaining blonde through her eighties and continuing to attend film festivals and galas, Savage had a series of strokes and became a resident of the Motion Picture and Television Country House and Hospital in California. She died in her sleep on December 25, 2008, aged 87. Her remains are interred with her husband Bert D'Armand at the Hollywood Forever Cemetery in Los Angeles, California. Her personal and career memorabilia will become part of the Harry Ransom Center at the University of Texas at Austin alongside the archives of Robert De Niro, David Mamet, David O. Selznick, Gloria Swanson, and others.

== Legacy ==
In 2005, Savage was elevated to the status of "icon and legend" by the Academy of Motion Picture Arts and Sciences. In 2007, Time named Savage's role as Vera in Detour one of the "Top 10 Movie Villains" and Detour as one of the 100 best movies. In 2010, McFarland and Co. published Savage Detours: The Life and Work of Ann Savage, by Kent Adamson and Lisa Morton.

== Filmography ==
=== Features ===
Year	Title	Role	Notes
1943	One Dangerous Night	Vivian	
1943	After Midnight with Boston Blackie	Betty Barnaby	
1943	Murder in Times Square	Miss Ruth	Uncredited
1943	Saddles and Sagebrush	Ann Parker	
1943	The More the Merrier	Miss Dalton	Uncredited
1943	Two Señoritas from Chicago	Maria	
1943	Passport to Suez	Valerie King	
1943	Dangerous Blondes	Erika McCormick	
1943	Footlight Glamour	Vicki Wheeler	
1943	Klondike Kate	Kathleen O'Day	
1943	What a Woman!	Jane Drake	
1944	Two-Man Submarine	Pat Benson	
1944	The Last Horseman	Judy Ware	
1944	Ever Since Venus	Janet Wilson	
1944	The Unwritten Code	Mary Lee Norris	
1944	Dancing in Manhattan	Valerie Crawford	
1945	Scared Stiff	Sally Warren	
1945	Midnight Manhunt	Sue Gallagher	
1945	Apology for Murder	Toni Kirkland	
1945	Detour	Vera	
1945	The Spider	Florence Cain	
1946	The Dark Horse	Mary Burton	
1946	The Last Crooked Mile	Sheila Kennedy	
1946	Lady Chaser	Inez Marie Polk / Palmer	
1946	Renegade Girl	Jean Shelby	
1947	Jungle Flight	Laurey Roberts	
1949	Any Number Can Play	Woman in Office	Uncredited
1949	Satan's Cradle	Lil	
1950	Pygmy Island	Capt. Ann R. Kingsley	
1951	Pier 23	Ann Harmon	
1953	Woman They Almost Lynched	Glenda	
1986	Fire with Fire	Sister Harriet	
2007	My Winnipeg	Mother	Final film role

=== Television ===
Year	Title	Role	Notes
1950, 1952	Fireside Theatre	Colette	4 Episodes "The Exile" (1952), "The Roof" (1952), "Polly" (1950) "Judas" (1950)
1951	Mystery Theater	Lena	Episode "The Case of the Missing Gun"
1951	Front Page Detective	Patti Carroll	Episode: "Clean Sweep"
1952	Schlitz Playhouse of Stars		Episode: "Tango"
1953	Death Valley Days	Diamond Babe	Season 2, Episode 1, "The Diamond Babe"
1954	City Detective	Lisa	Episode: "Cruise Ship"
1955	Gang Busters	Juanita	Episode: "The Red Dress Case"
1955	The Ford Television Theatre	Maggie	Episode: "Magic Formula"
1955	City Detective	Natalie	Episode: "In Sickness and in Stealth"
1991	Saved by the Bell	Mrs. Thornhill	Episode: "Boss Lady" Uncredited

== See also ==
- Pin-ups of Yank, the Army Weekly
