= The Tiger Woman (1945 film) =

1945 film by Philip Ford

- Theatrical release poster
- Directed by: Philip Ford
- Screenplay by: George Carleton Brown
- Produced by: Dorrell McGowan; Stuart E. McGowan
- Starring: Adele Mara; Kane Richmond; Richard Fraser; Peggy Stewart; Cy Kendall; Gregory Gaye
- Cinematography: Ernest Miller
- Edited by: Fred Allen
- Production company: Republic Pictures
- Distributed by: Republic Pictures
- Release date: November 16, 1945
- Running time: 57 minutes
- Country: United States
- Language: English

The Tiger Woman is a 1945 American crime film directed by Philip Ford, written by George Carleton Brown, and starring Adele Mara, Kane Richmond, Richard Fraser, Peggy Stewart, Cy Kendall and Gregory Gaye. It was released on November 16, 1945, by Republic Pictures.

The film was based on a radio play by John Dunkel.

== Plot ==
Nightclub singer Sharon Winslow tells a detective, Jerry Devery, that her husband owes gambler Joe Sapphire a lot of money and fears he will be killed. Sapphire insists to the cop that the debt has been paid in full, but when Sharon's husband is found dead, suspicion understandably falls on Sapphire.

It turns out the dead man left a suicide note, but Sharon and her lover, her husband's business partner Stephen Mason, destroy the note so that Sharon can claim it was a murder and collect the insurance money. Sharon is, in fact, the murderer, and she double-crosses Mason as well.

A suspicious Jerry decides to romance Sharon just to be able to get closer to her. They go away together on a train, where Sharon pulls a gun on Jerry and admits that he was right about her. His police colleagues then come out of hiding to place her under arrest.

== Cast ==
- Adele Mara as Sharon Winslow
- Kane Richmond as Jerry Devery
- Richard Fraser as Stephen Mason
- Peggy Stewart as Phyllis Carrington
- Cy Kendall as Inspector Henry Leggett
- Gregory Gaye as Joe Sapphire
- John Kelly as Sylvester
- Beverly Lloyd as Constance Grey
- Addison Richards as Mr. White
- Donia Bussey as Rosie Gargan
- Frank Reicher as Coroner
- Garry Owen as Bartender
