= Valley of the Zombies =

1946 film by Philip Ford

- Theatrical release poster
- Directed by: Philip Ford
- Screenplay by: Dorrell McGowan; Stuart E. McGowan
- Story by: Royal K. Cole; Sherman L. Lowe
- Starring: Robert Livingston; Adrian Booth; Ian Keith; Thomas E. Jackson; Charles Trowbridge; Earle Hodgins
- Cinematography: Reggie Lanning
- Edited by: William P. Thompson
- Production company: Republic Pictures
- Distributed by: Republic Pictures
- Release date: May 24, 1946
- Running time: 56 minutes
- Country: United States

Valley of the Zombies is a 1946 American horror film directed by Philip Ford, written by Dorrell McGowan and Stuart E. McGowan, and starring Robert Livingston, Adrian Booth, Ian Keith, Thomas E. Jackson, Charles Trowbridge and Earle Hodgins. The film is about Ormand Murks (Keith), who is resurrected and tours the city for human blood, predominantly from his old enemies. This draws the attention of police lieutenant Blair (Jackson). Doctor Terry Evans (Livingston) decides to track down Murks to stop his murder spree.

The film was Ford's second film as a director as part of his contract at Republic Pictures. It was shot in September 1945 and released on May 24, 1946. Retrospective reviews predominantly focus on the lack of any zombies promised in the film's title while finding the film lacking in thrills.

== Plot ==
Five years earlier, Dr. Rufus Maynard put Ormand Murks into an insane asylum because Murks believed that endless blood transfusions would make him immortal. Asylum director Dr. Garland operated on Murks two years later, and Murks died on the operating table. Murks' body is turned over to a brother.

In the present, Murks returns and begins stealing blood from Dr. Maynard's lab. Murks reveals himself to Maynard, telling him that voodoo has kept him alive, and then kills Maynard and his lab assistant, Fred. Cops discover Maynard's half-buried body in a local cemetery. Detectives Blair and Hendricks accuse Maynard's partner, Dr. Terry Evans, and a nurse, Evans' girlfriend Susan Drake, of killing Maynard but have no proof. Discovering a connection between Maynard and Murks, Evans and Drake head to the Murks estate to look for clues. Murks tries trapping them in a mausoleum, but they escape. In the main house, Evans and Drake find the body of Dr. Garland.

Blair and Hendricks arrive, but Garland's body vanishes. Murks kidnaps Drake and takes her to Maynard's office, where he hypnotizes her and has her give him blood transfusions. The cops arrive and shoot Murks before he can order Susan to kill Terry.

== Cast ==
Cast adapted from Poverty Row Horrors!.

- Robert Livingston as Dr. Terry Evans
- Adrian Booth as Susan Drake
- Ian Keith as Ormand Murks
- Thomas E. Jackson as Blair
- Charles Trowbridge as Dr. Rufus Maynard
- Earle Hodgins as Fred Mays
- LeRoy Mason as Hendricks
- William Haade as Tiny
- Wilton Graff as Dr. Lucifer Garland
- Charles Cane as Police Inspector Ryan
- Russ Clark as Lacy
- Chuck Hamilton as The Driver

== Production ==
Valley of the Zombies was shot in mid-September 1945. The film was the second feature for director Philip Ford after The Tiger Woman (1945) which earned him a seven-year contract with Republic Pictures.

== Release ==
Valley of the Zombies was released on May 24, 1946. It was distributed by Republic Pictures Corp. Boxoffice Magazine stated that for its 1945 to 1946 series, it had unsuffiicent date to track the films box office gross in the United States.

== Reception ==
From contemporary reviews, a reviewer in Variety stated that the film will "never get out of the B league", noting a "un-zombie-like zombie and a fairly horrorless story, despite half a dozen murders." and that the "scripting features all the horror-whodunnit cliches." The review noted the "photography is better than fair" and the inclusion of Ian Keith and other experienced supporting actors "brings thesping up to a good B level."

From retrospective reviews, Ronald V. Borst of Photon noted that "throughout the picture a great many cliches are present" noting that the screenplay was basically a reworking of the Warner Bros. film The Return of Dr. X (1939). The film praised some elements, namely its "darkly photographed settings, its musical score, and the surprisingly well-played performance by Ian Keith." concluding that the film is "neither a gem nor a bomb, but is enjoyable, even today." film historian Tom Weaver stated that like many films written for Republic Pictures, Valley of the Zombies's script did not "know how monsters worked", noting that the writers didn't see much difference between zombies and vampires. Don Willis, author of the Horror and Science Fiction Films series declared that the film had "no thrills" and was "always cliched, sometimes cloddish dialogue" while finding the leads "mildly amusing."

Weaver noted that Ford and cinematographer Reggie Lanning added "solid contributions to the ominous atmosphere", but that the main issue was that Robert Livingston and Adrian Booth both often had dialogue that was meant to be clever or cute but there was rarely anything clever or witty about it. Weaver concluded that the film was probably corny by 1940s standards, and was "just another b movie in a world overfilled with them."
