= The Catman of Paris =

1946 film

- Directed by: Lesley Selander
- Screenplay by: Sherman L. Lowe
- Starring: Carl Esmond; Lenore Aubert; Adele Mara; Douglass Dumbrille; Gerald Mohr; Fritz Feld
- Cinematography: Reggie Lanning
- Edited by: Harry Keller
- Music by: Dale Butts
- Production company: Republic Pictures
- Distributed by: Republic Pictures
- Release date: April 20, 1946
- Running time: 64 minutes
- Country: United States
- Language: English

The Catman of Paris is a 1946 American mystery and horror film directed by Lesley Selander and written by Sherman L. Lowe. The film stars Carl Esmond, Lenore Aubert, Adele Mara, Douglass Dumbrille, Gerald Mohr and Fritz Feld.

In the film, a writer has completed a controversial book. He is implicated in the murder of two acquaintances by a cat man. His current love interest uses a gun to terminate the cat man's threat.

== Plot ==
The writer Charles Regnier has authored a new book about a Dreyfus-esque trial that has major political implications. Charles confides in friend Henry Borchard over dinner in Paris that he has made enemies among citizens and even in the government as a result of his controversial work.

A librarian, Devereaux, is found murdered, clawed to death. Devereaux had been in possession of documents that supposedly could destroy Charles's reputation. When his former sweetheart Marguerite Duval is killed in a similar manner, Charles is beaten by townspeople and suspected by police.

Marie Audet, who loves Charles and believes in him, is given a gun by Henry to protect herself. But when she saves herself at night by shooting an intruder, it turns out to be Henry, who with his dying words confesses to the crimes.

== Cast ==
- Carl Esmond as Charles Regnier
- Lenore Aubert as Marie Audet
- Adele Mara as Marguerite Duval
- Douglass Dumbrille as Henry Borchard
- Gerald Mohr as Inspector Severen
- Fritz Feld as Prefect of Police
- Francis Pierlot as Paul Audet
- Georges Renavent as Guillard
- Francis McDonald as Devereaux
- Maurice Cass as Paul de Roche
- Alphonse Martell as Maurice Cocaignac
- Paul Marion as Jules
- John Dehner as Georges
- Anthony Caruso as Raoul
- Carl Neubert as Phillippe
- Elaine Lange as Blanche de Clermont
- Tanis Chandler as Yvette
- George Davis as Concierge

== Production ==
The Catman of Paris went into production on September 20 and finished filming on October 10, 1945. The film was produced in conjunction with Valley of the Zombies with the intent on making it Republic's first horror film double feature.

== Release ==
The Catman of Paris was distributed theatrically by the Republic Pictures Corp. on 20 April 1946.

== Reception ==
From retrospective reviews, Paul Gaita of AllMovie also gave the film a negative review, complimenting the film's action sequences but criticized the film's sluggish plot, lack of atmosphere and suspense; writing "This anemic period potboiler from Poverty Row studio Republic Pictures cribs most of its sluggish plot from the far superior Werewolf of London, but has none of that film's drive, atmosphere, or suspense". In Leonard Maltin's Movie Guide, the film was awarded with a one and a half out of a possible four star rating, calling it "talky [and] routine". A review in TV Guide rated the film two out of four stars, commending the film's direction, make-up effects, and performances.
