= The Chicago Kid =

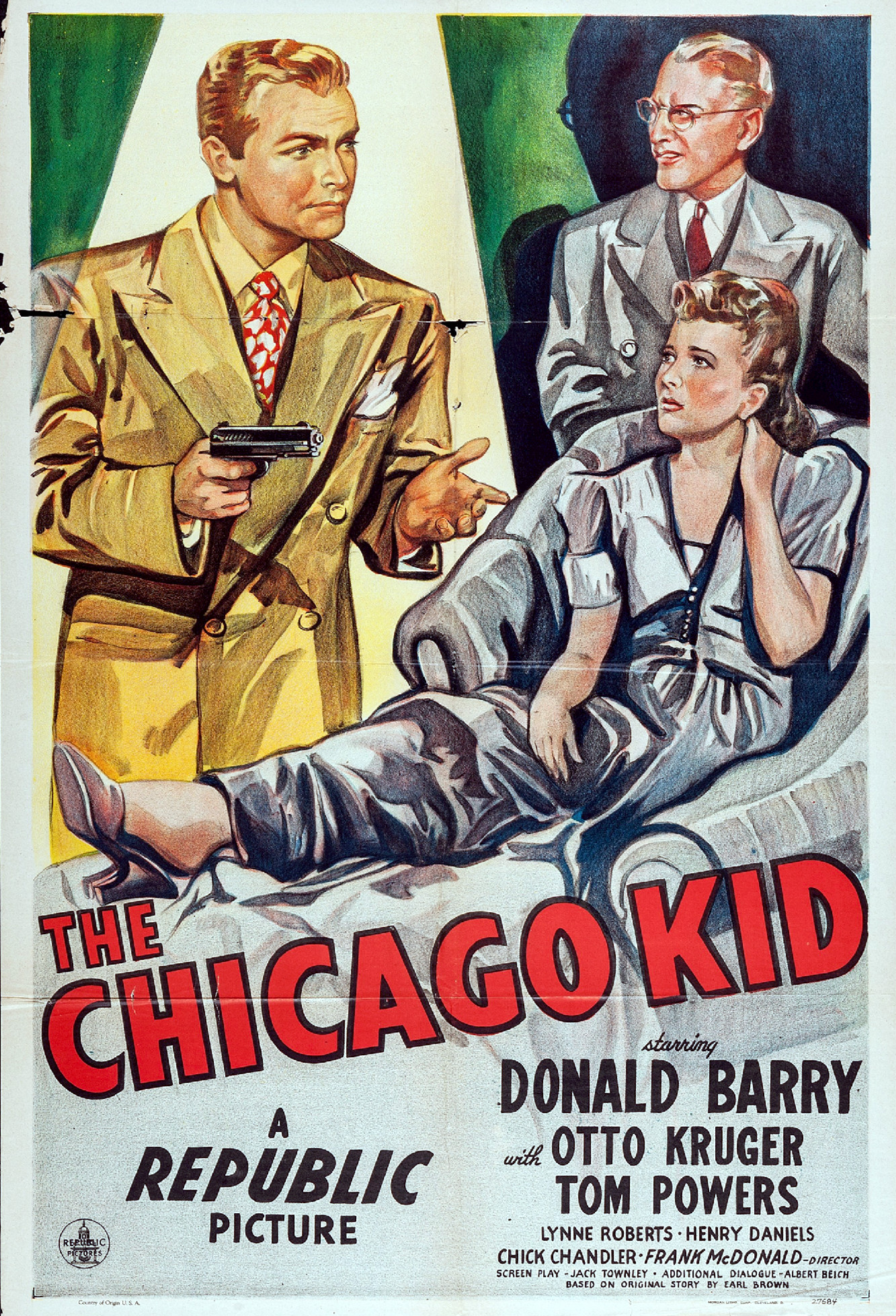
- Theatrical release poster
- Directed by: Frank McDonald
- Screenplay by: Jack Townley; Albert Beich
- Story by: Karl Brown
- Produced by: Edward J. White
- Starring: Don "Red" Barry; Otto Kruger; Tom Powers; Lynne Roberts; Henry H. Daniels Jr. Chick Chandler
- Cinematography: William Bradford
- Edited by: Ralph Dixon
- Music by: Joseph Dubin
- Production company: Republic Pictures
- Distributed by: Republic Pictures
- Release date: June 29, 1945
- Running time: 68 minutes
- Country: United States
- Language: English

The Chicago Kid is a 1945 American crime film directed by Frank McDonald and written by Jack Townley and Albert Beich. The film stars Don "Red" Barry, Otto Kruger, Tom Powers, Lynne Roberts, Henry H. Daniels Jr. and Chick Chandler. The film was released on June 29, 1945, by Republic Pictures.

== Cast ==
- Don "Red" Barry as Joe Ferrill
- Otto Kruger as John Mitchell
- Tom Powers as Mike Thurber
- Lynne Roberts as Chris Mitchell
- Henry H. Daniels Jr. as Bill Mitchell
- Chick Chandler as Squeak
- Joseph Crehan as Chief Rogers
- Jay Novello as Pinky
- Paul Harvey as Carter
- Addison Richards as The Warden
- Kenne Duncan as Al
