= The Last Horseman =

1944 film by William Berke

- Directed by: William Berke
- Written by: Ed Earl Repp
- Produced by: Leon Barsha
- Starring: Russell Hayden; Dub Taylor; Ann Savage
- Cinematography: George Meehan
- Edited by: Jerome Thoms
- Production company: Columbia Pictures
- Distributed by: Columbia Pictures
- Release date: June 22, 1944
- Running time: 54 minutes
- Country: United States
- Language: English

The Last Horseman is a 1944 American Western film directed by William Berke and starring Russell Hayden, Dub Taylor, and Ann Savage.

== Cast ==
- Russell Hayden as Lucky Rawlins
- Dub Taylor as Cannonball
- Bob Wills as Bob
- The Texas Playboys as Musicians, Cowhands
- Ann Savage as Judy Ware
- John Maxwell as Cash Watson
- Frank LaRue as Rance Williams
- Nick Thompson as Henchman Karp
- Blackie Whiteford as Henchman Slade
- Ted Mapes as Duke Cudlow
- Forrest Taylor as Bert Saunders

== Bibliography ==
- Morton, Lisa & Adamson, Kent. Savage Detours: The Life and Work of Ann Savage. McFarland, 2009.
