= Saddles and Sagebrush =

1943 film by William Berke

- Directed by: William Berke
- Written by: Ed Earl Repp
- Produced by: Leon Barsha
- Starring: Russell Hayden; Dub Taylor; Ann Savage
- Cinematography: Benjamin H. Kline
- Edited by: William F. Claxton
- Production company: Columbia Pictures
- Distributed by: Columbia Pictures
- Release date: April 27, 1943
- Running time: 54 minutes
- Country: United States
- Language: English

Saddles and Sagebrush is a 1943 American musical Western film directed by William Berke and starring Russell Hayden, Dub Taylor and Ann Savage.

The film's sets were designed by the art director Lionel Banks.

== Cast ==
- Russell Hayden as Lucky Randall
- Dub Taylor as Cannonball
- Ann Savage as Ann Parker
- Bob Wills as Bob Texas Playboys Band Leader
- The Texas Playboys as Cowhands, Musician
- William Wright as Krag Savin
- Frank LaRue as Lafe Parker
- Wheeler Oakman as Henchman Ace Barko
- Edmund Cobb as Henchman Cutter
- Jack Ingram as Henchman Trigger
- Joe McGuinn as Henchman Blackie

== Bibliography ==
- Morton, Lisa & Adamson, Kent. Savage Detours: The Life and Work of Ann Savage. McFarland, 2009.
