= Invisible Enemy =

Invisible Enemy is a 1938 American crime film directed by John H. Auer.

It may also refer to:

- The Invisible Enemy (Doctor Who), the second serial of the 15th season in the British science fiction television series Doctor Who
