= Robert Francis (actor) =

American actor (1930–1955)

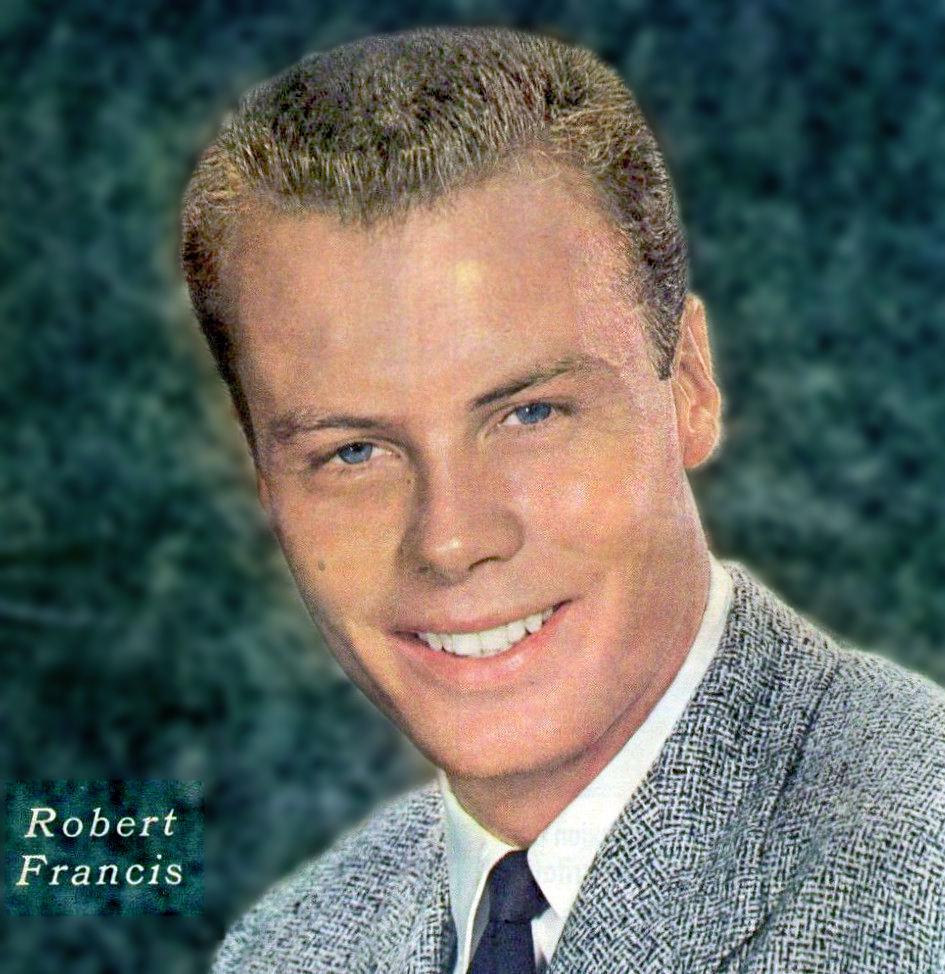
- Robert Francis in 1955 at age 25
- Born: Robert Charles Francis; February 26, 1930; Glendale, California, U.S.
- Died: July 31, 1955 (aged 25); Burbank, California, U.S.
- Resting place: Forest Lawn Memorial Park
- Occupation: Actor
- Years active: 1954–1955

Robert Charles Francis (February 26, 1930 – July 31, 1955) was an American actor. He appeared in only four Hollywood films, all with military themes, before he was killed at age 25 in the crash of a small airplane he was piloting.

== Early life ==
Robert Charles Francis was born in Glendale, California in 1930. His parents, James and Lillian Francis, ran a family pharmacy. He was the youngest by 10 years of three children. Francis was a conscientious student and an excellent skier, so much so that throughout the majority of his teenage years he had aspirations to join the U.S. Olympic team. While tanning himself on a Santa Monica beach, he was spotted by a Hollywood talent scout who persuaded him that with his handsome, all-American looks he should try to become an actor.

Francis graduated from Pasadena City College in 1947 and then began to take acting classes, though interrupted by a two-year stint in the U.S. Army. He attended the Batomi Schneider Drama Workshop, where the husband of his acting coach, who worked at Columbia Pictures, helped arrange a screen test for studio head Harry Cohn, who had been looking for a new male lead. Francis' quiet and peaceful manner, in contrast to those of others such as James Dean and Marlon Brando, appealed to Cohn, who was known for demanding obedience from his stars and staff. Although Francis tended to play reserved characters, they were often very rebellious in their approach. On the strength of his screen test, he earned a contract and a lead role in The Caine Mutiny.

Francis took a keen interest in aviation in his early twenties, and it was this passion that brought him to the attention of Howard Hughes. The two men frequently went flying together, with Francis most likely to be at the controls of Hughes' planes, though Francis' time in the air was curtailed once Cohn offered him a contract with Columbia.

== Career ==
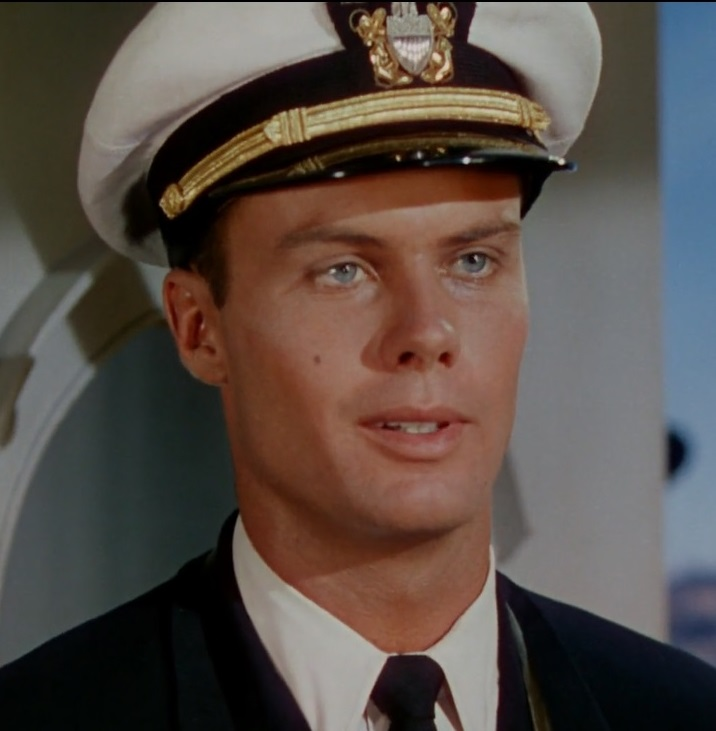
Robert Francis as Willie Keith in The Caine Mutiny

Francis' motion picture debut was also his most significant role, that of Ensign Willie Keith in The Caine Mutiny (1954), alongside Humphrey Bogart, Fred MacMurray, Van Johnson and José Ferrer. The film involved a romantic subplot opposite May Wynn. Prior to the film's release, Francis and Wynn were sent on press junkets together by Cohn as a way to showcase the studio's two youngest stars. As a result, gossip magazines reported a romance between the two and even a possible engagement. After The Caine Mutiny, Francis was voted one of Screen World's "Promising Personalities of 1954".

Capitalising on his rising star, Francis was cast in They Rode West (once more alongside Wynn), followed by The Bamboo Prison and John Ford's The Long Gray Line. In Ford's film, Francis was given third billing in the screen credits, indicating that Columbia had been projecting him to become a big star. Although he appeared in only four films in his short life and career, in each one he played a character in the military and received solid reviews.

Francis was then loaned to Metro-Goldwyn-Mayer (MGM) for Tribute to a Bad Man and was scheduled to travel to the film location in Wyoming to begin filming, a journey he would never make.

== Death ==
A little more than a week before his departure for the Tribute to a Bad Man film set, on July 31, 1955, Francis was piloting a borrowed Beechcraft Bonanza belonging to fellow actor Joe Kirkwood Jr. Also on board were Kirkwood's business partner, George Meyer, 38, a commercial pilot who had flown B-29 bombers in World War II, and actress Ann Russell, 24. Immediately after a 5:00 p.m. takeoff (which eyewitnesses called "poor") from Lockheed Air Terminal (now Hollywood Burbank Airport) in Burbank, the plane's engine began to sputter and then lost power over Restland Cemetery. Francis managed to avoid crashing into a crowd at nearby Valhalla Memorial Park Cemetery, but the aircraft stalled and crashed in a parking lot where it burst into flames, killing all three occupants.

Francis was buried at Forest Lawn Memorial Park on August 2, 1955. He was 25 years old.

== Filmography ==
- The Caine Mutiny (1954) as Ensign Willis Seward "Willie" Keith
- They Rode West (1954) as Dr. Allen Seward
- The Bamboo Prison (1954) as MSgt John A. Rand
- The Ed Sullivan Show (1955, TV series, Season 22, Episode 8) as himself
- The Long Gray Line (1955) as James N. Sundstrom Jr. (final film role)
