= Paul F. Heard =

American film director (1913–1964)

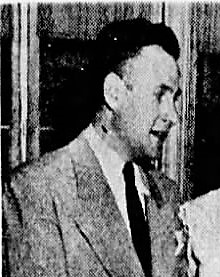
- Heard in December 1949
- Born: Paul Frederic Heard; October 14, 1913; Olivia, Minnesota, US
- Died: February 27, 1964 (aged 50); Los Angeles, California
- Education: Lawrence College; University of Minnesota
- Occupations: Film producer, director, scriptwriter
- Years active: 1938–1963
- Known for: Religious films
- Spouse: Gwendolin Vandarwarka

Paul Frederic Heard (October 14, 1913 – February 27, 1964) was an American film producer, director, and scriptwriter of religious films. From 1946 to 1951 he served as executive director of the Protestant Film Commission, which produced short films for distribution to denominational churches across the United States and Canada. He then formed his own independent production house for religious films. His short film Kenji Comes Home (1949) was nominated for the Academy Award for Best Documentary Feature.

== Early life and education ==
Paul Frederic Heard was born on October 14, 1913, in Olivia, Minnesota. His father, Rev. J. W. Heard, and grandfather, Rev. C. M. Heard, were both Methodist ministers.

Heard studied at Lawrence College, his father's alma mater, from 1929 to 1931. He enrolled at the University of Minnesota from 1933 until his graduation in 1935, studying film production in the school's visual education department.

== Career ==
From 1938 to 1940, Heard worked as a production supervisor in the University of Minnesota's visual education department. In 1940, he became director of films for the Methodist Church's national board of missions in New York. From 1942 to 1945, he was Orientation Film Officer for the Bureau of Naval Personnel in Washington, D.C. In the latter capacity, he produced training and propaganda films for the United States Navy.

In 1945, Heard was appointed executive director of the newly formed Protestant Film Commission. At that time, he commented that "similar techniques" as those used in government propaganda films could be applied to religious films to bring about "spiritual realizations" regarding the challenges of modern life.

When the Protestant Film Commission merged with the Protestant Radio Commission to form the Broadcasting and Film Commission (BFC) of the National Council of Churches of Christ in December 1950, Heard was named director of films in the new organization. But in 1951, he resigned in order to become an independent producer of Christian films. He was president of Paul F. Heard Inc, a motion picture production company, until 1963. In 1954, the Los Angeles Times called Paul F. Heard Inc. "one of the big three producers of religious films", and said that Heard had had a hand in the production of hundreds of films for this sector. Heard entered the television market in the early 1950s with the production of a 13-part series of short films titled What's Your Troubles, featuring Dr. and Mrs. Norman Vincent Peale.

== Honors and awards ==
At the 22nd Academy Awards, Heard's production Kenji Comes Home was nominated for Best Documentary Feature; it lost to the British documentary Daybreak in Udi.

We Hold These Truths (1952), a Paul F. Heard Inc. production, was named best film in its category at a Stamford, Connecticut, film festival.

== Memberships ==
Heard was a member of the Academy of Motion Pictures Arts and Sciences and of Toastmasters International.

== Personal life ==
In October 1941, Heard's father officiated at his marriage to Gwendolin Vandarwarka in Appleton, Wisconsin. In 1950, his wife's mother moved to California and lived with them until her death a month after her 100th birthday in 1963.

Heard died on February 27, 1964, aged 50, after undergoing surgery for cancer at Veterans Hospital in San Fernando. Funeral services were held at the Hollywood Congregational Church and burial took place at Mountain View Cemetery in Altadena.

== Selected filmography ==
- Kenji Comes Home (1949) – producer
- Prejudice (1949) – executive producer
- Second Chance (1950) – producer
- Again Pioneers (1950) – producer
- South of the Clouds (1950) – producer
- A Wonderful Life (1951) – producer
- The Congregation (1951) – producer
- More for Peace (1952) – producer
- We Hold These Truths (1952) – producer
- For Every Child (1953) – producer
- City Story (1954) – producer
- The Hidden Heart (1954) – producer
- What Price Freedom? (1955) – director
- Hong Kong Affair (1958) – producer, director, co-writer
- The Broken Mask (1958) – producer
- The Secret of the Gift (1959) – producer, co-writer

== Sources ==
- Blum, Daniel, ed. (1959). Screen World. Biblo & Tannen Publishers. ISBN 9780819602657.
- International Television Almanac. Quigley Publishing Company. 1982. ISBN 9780900610271.
- Library of Congress Copyright Office (1956). Catalog of Copyright Entries. Third Series: 1955: January–June. Copyright Office, Library of Congress. p. 267.
- Marshall, Wendy L. (2005). William Beaudine: From Silents to Television. Scarecrow Press. ISBN 9780810852181.
- Romanowski, William D. (2012). Reforming Hollywood: How American Protestants Fought for Freedom at the Movies. Oxford University Press. ISBN 9780199969180.
