= Mary Grace Borel =

American actress (1915–1998)

- Born: October 31, 1915; San Francisco, California, US
- Died: May 18, 1998 (aged 82); Los Angeles, California
- Other name: Mary Marshall
- Known for: Socialite
- Spouses: Charles Albert Shumate (m. 1935; div. 1937) Alan Marshal (m. 1938; div. 1948) Clyde Robert Sweet (m. 1958, divorced) Peter V. Paxton (m. 1963) Willard C. Chamberlin (m. 1972; div. 1983)
- Children: 1

Mary Grace Borel Shumate Marshal Sweet Paxton (October 31, 1915 – May 18, 1998) was an American socialite and film actress. She was the granddaughter of Antoine Borel, a San Francisco banker and consul general of Switzerland, and her family was prominent on the San Francisco social scene. Her debut was attended by 200 guests in 1934. Her 1935 marriage to the physician son of the San Francisco Police Commissioner was said to be "the highlight of the 1935 social season". Two years later she sued for divorce and, in 1938, remarried to film actor Alan Marshal, with whom she had one son. She sued for divorce in 1947; she later remarried two more times. Using the stage name Mary Marshall, she acted in two films and two television series. Upon her death in 1998, she was buried in the same crypt as her second husband, Alan Marshal.

== Early life and education ==
Mary Grace Borel was born in San Francisco, California, on October 31, 1915. She was the eldest daughter of Antoine A. Borel Jr., and his wife Mardie McMahon. Her paternal grandfather, Antoine Borel, was a prominent San Francisco banker and consul general of Switzerland. She had one younger sister, Victoire. Borel's family was prominent on the San Francisco social scene. A debutante ball with 400 invited guests in honor of her father's sisters, Alice and Grace, was reported in an 1898 newspaper article. Mary Grace's own family's doings were often written up in the local society pages, as for example a news item about Mary Grace's eighth birthday party in 1923, her family's summer vacation plans after their return from Europe in 1927, and her participation in the annual Horse Show and Race Meet of the Gymkhana Club of San Mateo and her sister's own blue-ribbon-winning horse.

Borel graduated from the Dominican Convent in San Rafael. She was a member of the Junior League and the Spinsters of San Francisco.

Borel made her own debut before 200 guests at the Town and Country Club in San Francisco in January 1934. An article in the San Francisco Examiner described her dress—a white moss crepe gown with a red velvet cape, white velvet gloves, and white satin shoes—and the party in detail.

== Marriages ==
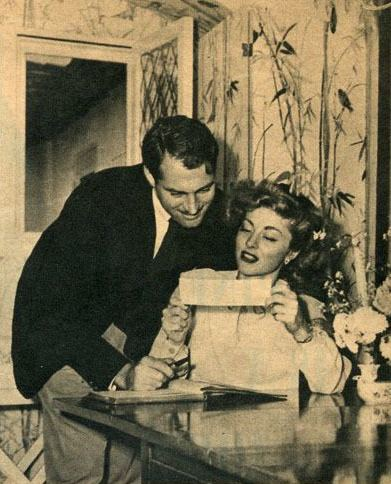
Alan and Mary Marshal at home, 1940s

Before the year was out, Borel's engagement to Charles Albert Shumate, the physician son of San Francisco Police Commissioner Thomas E. Shumate, was announced. Their wedding, which took place in April 1935, was said to have been "the highlight of the 1935 social season". Borel sued for divorce in October 1937 on the grounds of "extreme cruelty". She was granted the divorce in a hearing that lasted less than five minutes by Superior Court Judge Aylett R. Cotton Jr., who was her aunt's husband but was not disqualified from presiding at the hearing. Shumate did not attend the hearing but was represented by his attorney. After the divorce, Borel retained her maiden name.

Borel moved to Los Angeles, where she met Australian-born Hollywood film actor Alan Marshal. The couple eloped to Las Vegas in November 1938 and settled in Marshal's home in Brentwood. They had one son, Christopher ("Kit"), who also became an actor. In August 1947, Borel filed for divorce from Marshal on the grounds of cruelty. She requested "reasonable support", estimating her husband's weekly earnings at $2,250. The marriage was dissolved in 1948.

Borel married for the third time in July 1958 to Clyde Robert Sweet, an interior decorator from Lafayette. In 1963, it was reported that that marriage, too, had ended in divorce and that Borel was remarried to her fourth husband, Peter V. Paxton, a Los Angeles insurance broker.

Borel married for a fifth time to Willard C. Chamberlin in 1972. They divorced in 1983.

== Later life ==
Borel, credited as Mary Marshall, made her film debut in Prejudice (1949), a drama produced by the Protestant Film Commission. She appeared in one other film role and two television series episodes.

== Filmography ==
Film
| Year | Title | Role |
|---|---|---|
| 1949 | Prejudice | Beth Hanson |
| 1989 | She-Devil | Mary's party guest |

TV
| Year | Title | Role | Notes |
|---|---|---|---|
| 1958 | Drake's Progress | | Series 2, episode 1 |
| 1959 | Glencannon | Waitress | Episode: "The Ancient Mariner" |
