= Louis Forbes =

American composer, songwriter, and conductor

Louis Forbes (born Louis Forbstein on August 12, 1902, in St. Louis, Missouri-June 17, 1981) was an American composer, songwriter and conductor.

== Career ==
Forbes was a music student under the tutelage of renowned musicians Edward Kilenyi and Max Steiner. He was under contract to David O. Selznick for seven years, and later served as the director of music for Goldwyn Productions for three years. He also worked for RKO, contributing to several popular films with his musical compositions. In 1951, Forbes joined the American Society of Composers, Authors, and Publishers (ASCAP). Throughout his career, he penned a number of popular songs, including the "Appointment in Honduras" theme.

Forbes' talent and dedication to his craft earned him critical acclaim and recognition in the industry. He was nominated for five Academy Awards for his music scoring on the films Intermezzo (1939); Up in Arms (1944); Wonder Man (1945); Brewster's Millions (1945); and This Is Cinerama (1952). Notably, Forbstein was the brother of Leo F. Forbstein, another prominent composer and conductor in the film industry. Forbes died on June 17, 1981, in Los Angeles, California.

== Film credits ==
- Hong Kong Affair (1958)
- "Count the Hours" (1953)
- This Is Cinerama (1952)
- The Man Who Cheated Himself (1950)
- Second Chance (1950)
- Johnny One-Eye (1950)
- Mrs. Mike (1949)
- Pitfall (1948)
- Intrigue (1947)
- The Fabulous Dorseys (1947)
- The Kid from Brooklyn (1946)
- Tomorrow Is Forever (1946)
- Getting Gertie's Garter (1945)
- Story of G.I. Joe (1945)
- Wonder Man (1945)
- Brewster's Millions (1945)
- Since You Went Away (1944)
- Up in Arms (1944)
- Pot o' Gold (1941)
- Rebecca (1940)
- Gone with the Wind (1939)
- Tower of London (1939)
- Intermezzo (1939)
- Made for Each Other (1939)
- Little Orphan Annie (1938)
- The Adventures of Tom Sawyer (1938)
- Nothing Sacred (1937)
- Oh, Doctor (1937)
- Let Them Live (1937)
- Night Key (1937)
- She's Dangerous (1937)
- Mysterious Crossing (1936)
