= Dramatic School =

Dramatic School may refer to:

- Dramatic School (film), a 1938 American romantic drama film
- Drama school
