= Married and in Love =

- Directed by: John Farrow
- Screenplay by: S. K. Lauren
- Based on: play Distant Fields by S. K. Lauren
- Produced by: Robert Sisk
- Starring: Alan Marshal; Patric Knowles; Barbara Read
- Cinematography: J. Roy Hunt
- Edited by: Harry Marker
- Music by: Arthur Lange
- Production company: RKO
- Release date: January 19, 1940
- Running time: 59 minutes
- Country: United States
- Language: English

Married and in Love is a 1940 American drama film directed by John Farrow.

== Plot ==
A doctor, Leslie Yates, and a writer, Doris Wilding, once romantically involved, run into each other after a long time apart. Both are now married to other people.

Leslie asks her, along with their spouses, to dinner. Their love for one another is reignited. Helen, tipsy after dinner, lets Leslie know she can tell he's fondly remembering his former flame. Leslie's guilt gets the better of him, Helen having financed his way through medical school, but his heartstrings are pulling him in another direction.

Things come to a head when Paul walks in on his wife and Leslie sharing a kiss. Although they are hesitant to continue with plans for the four to again meet for dinner, they all do. During the course of events, everyone realizes he or she is wed to the right person after all.

== Cast ==
- Alan Marshal as Leslie
- Patric Knowles as Paul
- Barbara Read as Helen Yates
- Helen Vinson as Doris

== Production ==
The film was based on a play Distant Fields which had been presented in London in 1937. RKO bought the film rights in October 1937 intending to make it a vehicle for Barbara Stanwyck. Rowland V. Lee was assigned to direct. Jesse L. Lasky announced the film would be done in the style of 1933's The Power and the Glory and that Herbert Marshall, Joan Bennett and Joel McCrea would be sought to play support roles. However plans to make the film were thrown into disarray when Stanwyck refused to make the movie and was placed on suspension.

In June 1939 RKO announced they still intended to film the play. John Archer and Barbara Read were announced for the roles intended for Joel McCrea and Stanwyck. Eventually Archer was replaced by Patric Knowles.

Filming began 19 October 1939.
