= Charlie Chan in London =

1934 American mystery film directed by Eugene Forde

- Directed by: Eugene Forde
- Written by: Earl Derr Biggers; Philip MacDonald; Stuart Anthony
- Produced by: John Stone
- Starring: Warner Oland
- Cinematography: L. William O'Connell
- Distributed by: Fox Film
- Release date: September 12, 1934
- Running time: 79 minutes
- Country: United States
- Language: English

Charlie Chan in London is a 1934 American mystery film directed by Eugene Forde. The film stars Warner Oland as Charlie Chan. This is the sixth film produced by Fox with Warner Oland as the detective, and the second not to be lost, after The Black Camel (1931).

Robert Altman's film Gosford Park, set in 1932, features a (fictional) character who produces the Chan films for Fox and claims to be in England doing research for Charlie Chan in London.

== Plot ==
A young English man is convicted of the murder of one Captain Hamilton of the Royal Air Force and sentenced to hang. His sister and her fiancé, convinced of his innocence, ask visiting detective Charlie Chan to investigate and find the real murderer. In order to solve the mystery, Chan must visit a lavish English country manor house, where the suspects vary from the housekeeper to a lawyer. Events soon indicate that the murderer is still actively trying to avoid capture, but Charlie Chan must set a trap to reveal the criminal's identity. He turns out to be Paul Frank, a spy masquerading under the name Geoffrey Richmond, who had murdered Captain Hamilton to steal plans of a military invention Hamilton had made.

== Cast ==
- Warner Oland as Charlie Chan
- Drue Leyton as Pamela Gray
- Ray Milland as Neil Howard (as Raymond Milland)
- Mona Barrie as Lady Mary Bristol
- Douglas Walton as Paul Gray
- Alan Mowbray as Paul Frank, alias Geoffrey Richmond
- George Barraud as Maj. Jardine
- Paul England as Bunny Fothergill
- Madge Bellamy as Becky Fothergill
- Walter Johnson as Jerry Garton
- Murray Kinnell as Captain Seton (alias Phillips, the butler)
- E. E. Clive as Detective Sergeant Thacker
- Elsa Buchanan as Alice Perkins (maid)
- Reginald Sheffield as Flight Commander King
- Perry Ivins as Assistant Home Secretary Kemp
- John Rogers as Lake (chief groom)
- C. Montague Shaw as Doctor
- David Torrence as Home Secretary Sir Lionel Bashford
- Claude King as RAF aerodrome commander
- Arthur Clayton as Warden

== Critical reception ==
A review of the film in The New York Times noted that "the plot is sufficiently baffling, and Mr. Oland does [...] well indeed" in the role of Chan, that it "scarcely need be said that the actual murderer is someone unexpected," and that "Forde's direction is rapid and intelligent." Variety reported that "As mystery stories go this is well above average," and "While the cast is well chosen its members are so completely subjugated to Chan’s importance that they impress collectively rather than as individual players."
