= I Met My Love Again =

1938 American film

- Directed by: Joshua Logan; Arthur Ripley; George Cukor (uncredited)
- Screenplay by: David Hertz
- Based on: Summer Lightning; 1936 novel by Allene Corliss
- Produced by: Walter Wanger
- Starring: Joan Bennett; Henry Fonda
- Cinematography: Hal Mohr
- Edited by: Otho Lovering; Edward Mann
- Music by: Heinz Roemheld (uncredited)
- Production company: Walter Wanger Productions
- Distributed by: United Artists
- Release date: January 14, 1938
- Running time: 77 minutes
- Country: United States
- Language: English
- Budget: $428,800
- Box office: $416,687

I Met My Love Again is a 1938 American romantic drama film distributed by United Artists, directed by Joshua Logan, Arthur Ripley and George Cukor. The screenplay was written by David Hertz, based on the novel Summer Lightning by Allene Corliss. The film stars Joan Bennett and Henry Fonda.

== Plot ==
Julie and Ives are two teen sweethearts on a walk together. They declare they love each other and want to get married as soon as Ives has earned enough money for them to live on.

The following Christmas, Julie is out in town with her friend, buying provisions for a Christmas party. Although there is a blizzard, the girls wager on who can reach home first; Julie takes the mountain road. She gets lost in the storm and her family and Ives begin to panic. She finds a small cottage, rented by pulp fiction writer Michael Shaw. He seduces her and the next morning they marry and elope to Paris.

Ten unhappy years pass for Julie and Ives. When Michael is shot in a brawl, Julie returns to her hometown with her daughter, Michael. Ives has become a college professor and the two meet curtly. One of Ives' students, Brenda Lane, has developed a massive crush on her teacher, and professes her love for him. Brenda uses almost the exact words Ives used to Julie ten years previously when she describes her love for him, and suddenly he realizes he still loves Julie. He rejects Brenda and invites Julie to the school prom with him.

During the evening, they find their love has re-blossomed, but it is ruined when Brenda makes a scene. Someone takes Brenda home and Julie and Ives decide to leave, but they also decide to get married as soon as possible.

When they arrive home, a man arrives with Brenda claiming she tried to hang herself after the party. Julie, distraught, rushes out to the car where Brenda is waiting and begins to drive it at high speeds, claiming she is going to kill them both as neither of them can have Ives. Brenda begs her not to do it, claiming she didn't really try to kill herself, and only pretended to do so to get Ives back for rejecting her.

Julie and Ives get married at long last.

== Cast ==
- Joan Bennett as Julie Weir Shaw
- Henry Fonda as Ives Towner
- Louise Platt as Brenda Lane
- Alan Marshal as Michael Shaw
- May Whitty as Aunt William
- Alan Baxter as Tony
- Dorothy Stickney as Mrs. Towner
- Tim Holt as Budge Williams
- Florence Lake as Carol Towner
- Elise Cavanna as Agatha
- Henry Brandon as Bruno – the Painter

== Production ==
The film was known as Carelessly.

== Reception ==
The film didn't make a profit, but lost $64,104.

Holt and Fonda reprised their roles on a radio dramatisation of the film on Hollywood Hotel.
