= A Wonderful Life (film) =

1951 film

- Directed by: William Beaudine
- Written by: Alan Shilin
- Produced by: Paul F. Heard
- Starring: James Dunn; Allene Roberts; Arthur Shields
- Cinematography: Marcel Le Picard
- Edited by: Al Joseph
- Music by: Louis Forbes
- Distributed by: Protestant Film Commission
- Release date: 1951
- Running time: 45 minutes
- Country: United States
- Language: English

A Wonderful Life is a 1951 black-and-white short drama film produced by the National Council of Churches of Christ and distributed by the Protestant Film Commission. It is an adaptation of Frank Capra's 1946 film It's a Wonderful Life for the Christian film industry. Directed by William Beaudine, it stars James Dunn, Allene Roberts, and Arthur Shields. The film retells the life of an ordinary Christian family man in flashback as his family and friends remember all the good he did through his devotion to church and community. The film emphasizes the power of faith, love, and community service for living a meaningful life, together with the message that people do not realize the true worth of others until after they have died. The film was not released commercially, but was distributed to some 30,000 churches throughout the United States and Canada.

== Plot ==
Henry Wood (James Dunn) is an ordinary Christian family man who lives with faith, love, and dedication to his church and community in the fictional Martinville, Missouri. However, his acquaintances and family consider him naïve and someone who is easily taken advantage of. After his unexpected death, his family and friends gather to reminisce about his life, seen in flashback. Henry's daughter Mary is bitter about the way he never received remuneration for serving as treasurer in a host of committees, leaving the family to struggle financially. But after Henry's life and his effect on other people is reexamined—including his care of Mary when she was diagnosed with infantile paralysis, and his providing the funds to send her to college—Mary realizes that her father did live a meaningful life, and resolves to emulate his commitment to do good for others.

== Cast ==
- James Dunn as Henry Wood
- Allene Roberts as Mary Wood
- Isabel Withers as Jennie Wood
- Arthur Shields as Pastor
- Madge Crane as Grandma Wood
- Donna Jo Boyce as Mary Wood (age 9)
- Jack Larson as Richard Wood (age 16)
- David Kasday as Richard Wood (age 7)
- Andrew Tombes as Harry Jenkins

== Production ==
=== Development ===
A Wonderful Life is an adaptation of Frank Capra's 1946 film It's a Wonderful Life for the Christian film industry. The death of an ordinary Christian family man leaves a "spiritual vacuum" among his friends and neighbors due to his selfless acts of charity for his church and community. The story was inspired by a real-life case in Sedalia, Missouri. The original screenplay was written by Alan Shilin. The voice-over narration was supplied by Arthur Shields, who played the pastor.

The film was one of 11 short features directed by William Beaudine for the Protestant Film Commission. Beaudine was considered ideal for the job because of his "aversion to preaching": he was able "to create films with a strong story whose message was evident but not overwhelming". Technical advisers included Rev. S. Franklin Mack, an ordained Presbyterian minister who was director of films for the Broadcasting and Film Commission of the National Council of Churches of Christ, and Oscar Rumpf, who once served as a minister in Sedalia.

Producer Paul F. Heard and associate producer Barney Sarecky completed the film for the National Council of Churches of Christ.

=== Filming ===
Beaudine typically finished this and similar films on a six-day shooting schedule. The production, staged at KTTV studios in Los Angeles, with exterior scenes filmed in Sedalia, Missouri, was completed in December 1950.

== Release ==
The film was distributed exclusively to churches throughout the United States and Canada. These included Congregational Christian Churches, Presbyterian Church U.S.A., Evangelical churches, and Reformed churches, with a reach estimated at some 30,000 churches.

== Awards ==
The film won first prize in the Protestant Religious Section at the first annual film festival sponsored by the Film Council of Greater Boston in 1951.

== Sources ==
- The Committee on Film Classification (1969). Hearing Before the Committee on Congress, United States Senate, Ninetieth Congress, Second Session on S. Res. 9. U.S. Government Printing Office.
- Craggs, Stewart R. (2019). Soundtracks: International Dictionary of Composers of Music for Film (Reprint ed.). Routledge. ISBN 9780429777431.
- Lindvall, Terry; Quicke, Andrew (2011). Celluloid Sermons: The Emergence of the Christian Film Industry, 1930-1986. NYU Press. ISBN 9780814753255.
- Marshall, Wendy L. (2005). William Beaudine: From Silents to Television. Scarecrow Press. ISBN 9780810852181.
