= My Name Is Han =

1948 film

- Directed by: William James
- Produced by: International Film Foundation
- Music by: Norman Lloyd
- Distributed by: Protestant Film Commission
- Release date: 1948
- Running time: 25 minutes
- Country: United States
- Language: English

My Name Is Han is a 1948 black-and-white short docudrama produced by the International Film Foundation for the Protestant Film Commission. Shot on location in China and using only native Chinese non-professional actors, the film focuses on the work of Christian missionaries in China through the depiction of a minister, a doctor, a teacher, and an agricultural specialist. The plot centers around Han, a farmer who is battered by war, destruction, poverty, and hardship, yet refuses to accept the healing power of faith. But as he sees the effect of church teachings on his wife, his children, and his neighbors, and even benefits personally from Christian doctrine, he begins to accept Christ into his life. The film was the second in a series of short films developed under the auspices of the Protestant Film Commission for noncommercial release to denominational churches across the United States and Canada.

== Plot ==
Han, a Chinese farmer, tells his story through voice-over narration. He and his family, along with many others, were forced to flee during wartime as bombs rained down on their villages. Finally they are able to return, taking a long and weary journey on foot back home. While his wife still insists on giving thanks to God before they eat their meager meals on the side of the road, Han wants nothing to do with religion; he feels it is "foolishness". They return to their village and find the stone mission church still standing while their own home is in ruins. Han's peach orchard is also destroyed, as the trees were uprooted for firewood and the earth strewn with sand. Grimly, Han and his older son toil in the fields every day while his wife and younger children work on restoring the house. While Han's wife continues to be upbeat and buoyed by her faith, Han is bitter about all the troubles that have befallen him. As she and the children happily go to church on Sunday morning, he declares, "My religion is work".

Han also suspects the motives of the church missionaries. He listens in to a lecture and finds the missionary an intelligent man, but cannot believe that he really wants to help him. When the missionaries invite his daughter to attend the mission school, Han at first refuses but gives in when he sees how happy it makes his daughter. She learns to write and though he himself cannot read or write, he proudly keeps her writing in his pocket. The mission also helps the farmers by providing topsoil for them to begin planting again.

One day Han's young son finds an unexploded cartridge in their yard and playfully hammers it into the ground. It explodes, wounding him badly. Having no experience with prayer, Han is distraught. The boy is taken to the mission hospital, where the head doctor shows Han around and assures him the wound is not fatal. Han is amazed by how clean the mission hospital is and also how happy the children are there as they heal from their injuries. After spending two days in the hospital, Han returns to his field and cannot believe his eyes. All his neighbors are pitching in to plow and plant his field. He tells the minister that he cannot possibly pay them, and wonders what motivates them to help him. The minister explains that faith in Christ is expressed through deeds. Just as Christ helped others, it is one's Christian duty to help neighbors in need. Having seen the effect of faith on his wife, children, and neighbors, Han considers adopting it for himself. In the final scene, when his wife serves the meal and pauses to thank God for their food, Han also bends his head in prayer.

== Production ==
My Name Is Han was the second in a series of short films released by the Protestant Film Commission for screening in denominational churches across the United States and Canada. It was produced by Julien Bryan's non-profit International Film Foundation.

=== Casting ===
Only native Chinese are seen in the film, including Chinese Christian missionaries. The roles of Han and his wife are played by T'ang, a clerk in the Peiping Union Medical College, and Mrs. T'ang, the latter being cast as a condition for allowing her husband to appear in the film. Neither had any acting experience. The characters of Han's children and other youth were played by students at the American Board of Foreign Missions school. Extras on the film were "mainly ex-shop keepers and refugees from the Communists".

=== Filming ===
The film was shot on location in the Chinese province of Hopei. Principal photography was completed in six weeks during 1947 by an American film crew. The People's Liberation Army and the National Revolutionary Army were locked in battle close by throughout the filming, and the crew was warned not to venture out at night lest they be caught in the crossfire.

== Release ==
The film premiered in Protestant denominational churches in 100 cities in the United States and Canada on June 15, 1948. Following the premiere, the film was distributed to many more "churches, ministers' meetings, to youth groups, forums and church-sponsored meetings on labor-management problems".

The film's release coincided with the launch of a year-long study program on Christian missionary work in China by Protestant churches. In an ironic coda, a few months later Mao Zedong established his communist regime and expelled American missionaries from China.

== Critical reception ==
The Christian Advocate called the film "sincere, genuine and appealing". Lindvall and Quicke described the film as "extremely well photographed" and said that it "effectively portrayed Christian witness in China with an economy of dialogue and detail". The Akron Beacon Journal, which devoted a two-page pictorial spread to the release, said the film "packs more of a punch than many a Hollywood double feature".

== Awards ==
My Name Is Han was named best film with a religious theme by the Cleveland Film Council in 1948.

== Sources ==
- Carnegie Endowment for International Peace (1950). International Understanding: Catalogue of 16 Mm Films Dealing with the United Nations, Its Member States and Related Subjects (3rd ed.).
- Lindvall, Terry; Quicke, Andrew (2011). Celluloid Sermons: The Emergence of the Christian Film Industry, 1930-1986. NYU Press. ISBN 9780814753248.
- McCarty, Clifford (2000). Film Composers in America: A Filmography, 1911-1970. Oxford University Press. ISBN 9780195114737.
