= Pot o' Gold (film) =

1941 film by George Marshall

- 1941 Theatrical poster
- Directed by: George Marshall
- Written by: Andrew Bennison; Monte Brice
- Based on: Pot O' Gold; 1939--1941; 1946 radio series by Robert Brilmayer; Haydn Roth Evans
- Produced by: James Roosevelt
- Starring: James Stewart; Paulette Goddard; Horace Heidt; Charles Winninger; Mary Gordon
- Cinematography: Hal Mohr
- Edited by: Lloyd Nosler
- Music by: Lou Forbes
- Production company: James Roosevelt Productions
- Distributed by: United Artists
- Release date: April 3, 1941
- Running time: 86 minutes
- Country: United States
- Language: English
- Budget: $600,000

Pot o' Gold is a 1941 American romantic musical comedy film starring James Stewart and Paulette Goddard, directed by George Marshall, and based on the NBC radio series Pot o' Gold. The film was released by United Artists on April 3, 1941, eight months before the aforementioned NBC radio series came to an end. Paulette Goddard's singing voice was dubbed by Vera Van. The film was known as The Golden Hour in the United Kingdom.

== Plot ==
The full film

Jimmy Haskell is the owner of a music store in Point Jervis, New York. His uncle, Charles J. "C.J." Haskell, hates music and has long wanted Jimmy to join him in his health food business. Jimmy agrees only after his music store fails. When Jimmy arrives in the big city, he meets Molly McCorkle, who welcomes him into her mother's boardinghouse. Horace Heidt's band practices there, adjacent to the Haskell factory. C.J. is infuriated and sends his assistant to stop the band. Jimmy throws a tomato at C.J.'s assistant, only to hit C.J. himself, which makes a good impression on the band and the McCorkles. They don't know Jimmy's true identity, and Molly McCorkle falls in love with him.

When Jimmy substitutes for C.J. on his radio program, Molly's kid brother and Horace find out who he is. They devise a scheme to persuade C.J. to take a vacation. In the meantime, Jimmy takes over the operation of the business and invites Heidt's band to play on the show. Molly learns Jimmy's identity, and in anger, she says on-air that the Haskell program will give away $1000 every week. To protect her from prosecution, Jimmy claims the idea is his. He then has to find a way to give away the cash; a federal investigator informs him that there are many legal restrictions that make every scheme Jimmy and his associates can think up illegal.

Jimmy finally comes up with a method just before the show airs. He gets a bunch of telephone books, and Molly steals a carnival wheel, which they bring into the radio studio. They randomly select first the telephone book, then the page in it, and finally the entry on the page to determine the winner. The giveaway is immensely popular, with advertisers clamoring to sign up. This reconciles the Haskells and McCorkles, paving the way for Jimmy and Molly to get married.

== Cast ==
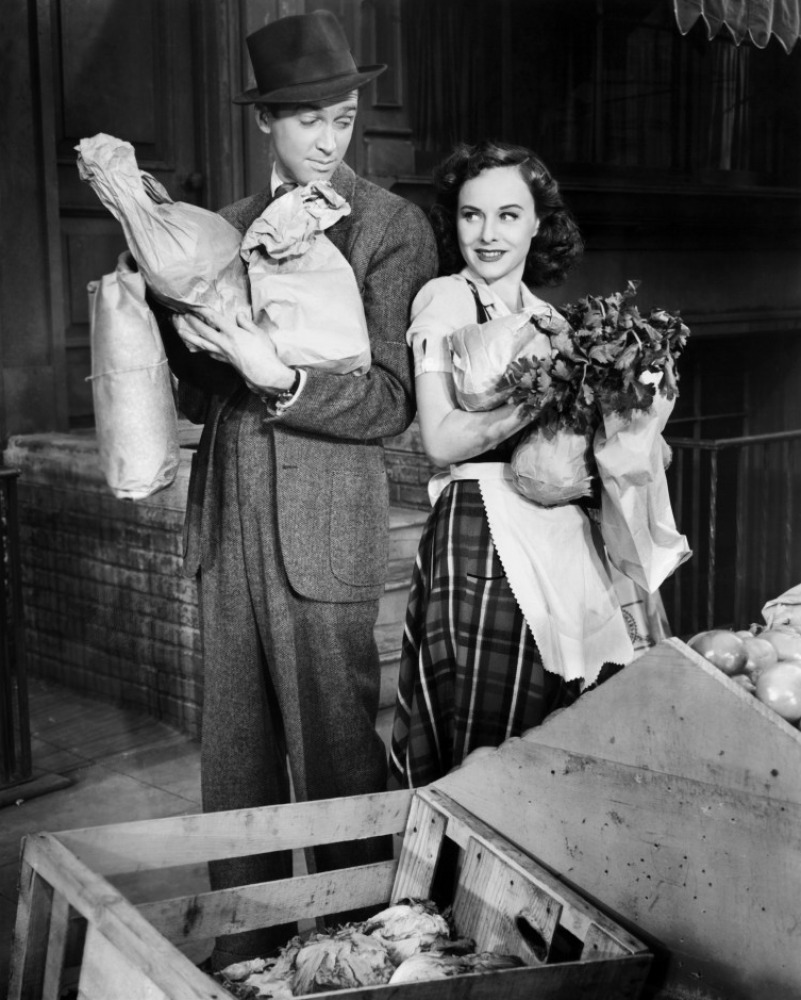
James Stewart and Paulette Goddard

- James Stewart as James Hamilton "Jimmy" Haskell
- Paulette Goddard as Molly McCorkle
- Horace Heidt as Himself
- Charles Winninger as Charles "C.J." Haskell
- Mary Gordon as Mom McCorkle
- Frank Melton as Jasper Backus, C.J.'s assistant
- Jed Prouty as J.K. Louderman, network manager
- Charles Arnt as Parks, butler
- Dick Hogan as Willie McCorkle
- James Burke as Police Lt. Grady
- Donna Wood as Donna McCorkle
- Larry Cotton as Larry Cotton, vocalist

== Background ==
Pot o' Gold was radio's first big-money giveaway program, garnering huge ratings within four weeks of its 1939 debut. The program's success prompted production of the film. The premise of the radio program, created by Ed Byron, was that any person who picked up the telephone when host Horace Heidt called would automatically win $1000. Phone numbers were chosen by three spins on the Wheel of Fortune: (1) choice of phone directory, (2) page number and (3) the line on the page. The series ran on NBC from September 26, 1939 to December 23, 1941 and later a new show by the same name from October 2, 1946 to March 26, 1947 on ABC.

== Soundtrack ==
- Various characters - "Hi, Cy, What's A-Cookin'?" (Written by Henry Russell and Louis Forbes)
- Paulette Goddard (dubbed by Vera Van) with Horace Heidt & His Musical Knights - "Pete the Piper" (Written by Henry Russell)
- James Stewart - "When Johnny Toots His Horn" (Written by Hy Heath and Fred Rose)
- Horace Heidt & His Musical Knights - "A Knife, a Fork and a Spoon" (Written by Dave Franklin)
- Larry Cotton with Horace Heidt & His Musical Knights - "Do You Believe in Fairy Tales?" (Music by Vee Lawnhurst, lyrics by Mack David)
- Paulette Goddard (dubbed by Vera Van) with Horace Heidt & His Musical Knights - "Broadway Caballero" (Written by Henry Russell)

== Production and reception ==
Producer James Roosevelt had been working in the motion picture industry since January 1939, as an executive and consultant. He formed Globe Productions at the end of the year, and soon announced that the first Globe production would be Pot o' Gold. While Pot o' Gold was in preparation, Roosevelt introduced a new concept: Soundies musical movies. These were three-minute musicals filmed especially for new coin-operated movie jukeboxes, and making their debut in September 1940. Many of the earliest Soundies films are very handsomely mounted, because they used many of the same sets, costumes, musicians, and dancers from Pot o' Gold, then in production.

When Pot o' Gold was released to theaters in April 1941, it was warmly received by trade critics. The general tone was that, although the story was unremarkable and formulaic, the film was a masterstroke of light entertainment. Motion Picture Herald reported: "Basic and proven ingredients artfully mixed and beaten to a light froth, with the final seasoning done exactly to a turn. The result is as satisfying as that achieved by a superb cook with ordinary kitchen ingredients.” "The story as a whole is light and frothy," agreed Film Daily, "and the picture as a whole is good entertainment for any and all audiences." The New York World-Telegram review called the film a “fast-moving comedy, abounding in tuneful numbers, speed, and good gags. It aspires to entertain and this it does with great success.” Boxoffice wrote: "Tailored for mass appeal, it should prove an impressively profitable exhibitor venture."

Because the film was produced independently — copyrighted by James Roosevelt personally and not owned or controlled by a studio — it became available for reissue in late 1943. Robert M. Savini of Astor Pictures bought the reissue rights from co-producer Henry Henigson (Henigson acted for James Roosevelt, who was serving in the Marine Corps). Savini retitled the film Jimmy Steps Out and released it to theaters in 1944. James Stewart was then away from the screen, serving in the Army, so Jimmy Steps Out became the only Stewart film on the wartime market and thus became a great success.

Like other independent ventures, the film came back to haunt the stars. Paulette Goddard and Horace Heidt had invested in the film's production and filed suit against producer Roosevelt for an accounting while Roosevelt was in the military. Because of the film's non-studio status it has been a TV perennial since 1948, and was an early arrival to home video. James Stewart, despairing of the film's omnipresent availability, was ashamed of its overexposure and referred to Pot o' Gold as the worst picture he ever appeared in.

Nine years later, Stewart did another movie about a big-money radio show, The Jackpot (1950).
