= Ellye Marshall =

American actress (1927–2019)

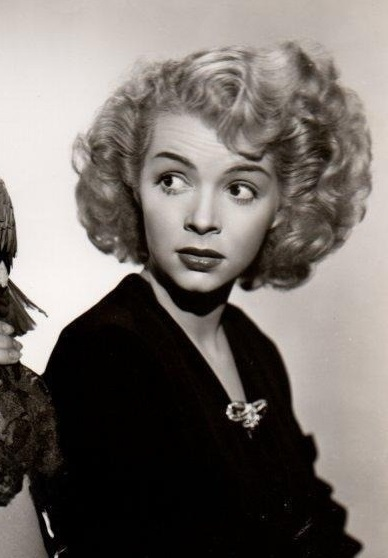
- Marshall in Champagne for Caesar (1950)
- Born: June 27, 1927
- Died: 2019 (aged 91–92); Nevada, U.S.
- Occupation: Actress
- Years active: 1950–1954
- Spouses: James Somers Jr.; Val Grund; Peter Lance

Ellye Marshall (June 27, 1927 – 2019) was an American actress. She appeared in five films in the early 1950s.

== Early life ==
Ellye Marshall was born in 1930. She graduated high school in Connecticut and then enrolled at the Barbizon Modeling and Acting School in Manhattan. To support herself between modeling jobs, she worked as a waitress and salesgirl in many establishments. She won a spot as a chorus girl at the Copacabana nightclub and was recognized as "Ideal Copacabana Girl", which came with a film contract with 20th Century Fox. She was then 18 years old.

== Career ==
After six months at Fox, Marshall's option was not picked up and she was ready to leave Hollywood. At that point she landed the role of Frosty in Champagne for Caesar, beating out 100 other applicants for the role of the "dumb blonde". She endured another year of few prospects before winning a part in Rogue River.

== Personal life ==
In late 1948, Marshall married James Somers Jr., an aspiring actor who worked as a cab driver; the marriage lasted nine months. In late 1950 she remarried to Val Grund, a music arranger working for Ken Murray's variety show.

== Filmography ==
Year	Title	Role	Notes
1950	Champagne for Caesar	Frosty	
1950	Second Chance	Irene	
1951	Rogue River	Judy Haven	
1953	Cat-Women of the Moon	Cat-Woman	
1954	The French Line	Model	Uncredited

== Selected Television ==
Year	Title	Role	Notes
1953	Death Valley Days	Julia Baldwin	Season 2, Episode 4, "Which Side of the Fence"
