= They Rode West =

1954 film by Phil Karlson

- Original film poster
- Directed by: Phil Karlson
- Screenplay by: DeVallon Scott; Frank Nugent
- Based on: Leo Katcher (based upon a story by)
- Produced by: Lewis J. Rachmil
- Starring: Robert Francis; Donna Reed; May Wynn; Philip Carey
- Cinematography: Charles Lawton Jr.
- Edited by: Henry Batista
- Music by: Paul Sawtell
- Color process: Technicolor
- Production company: Columbia Pictures
- Distributed by: Columbia Pictures
- Release dates: November 10, 1954 (Los Angeles); December 4, 1954 (United States)
- Running time: 84 minutes
- Country: United States
- Language: English

They Rode West is a 1954 American Western film directed by Phil Karlson. It reunites two of the stars of The Caine Mutiny, Robert Francis and May Wynn. It also stars Donna Reed and Philip Carey. Based on the story Wood Hawk by Leo Katcher, it was filmed at the Corriganville movie ranch, using the same fort set that was built in 1948 for the John Ford film "Fort Apache."

== Plot ==
Returning from a patrol, a well-liked officer of the 14th Cavalry is wounded in the leg by a renegade Kiowa's arrow. Brought back to the post, their incompetent surgeon kills him through a lack of knowledge of stopping bleeding. As the three previous post surgeons were an alcoholic, a drug addict and a surgeon whom the soldiers regarded as being a "butcher", a new surgeon is requested who is competent. Surgeon Lieutenant Seward arrives at the post with the wife of Colonel Waters, commanding the regiment, and his flirtatious niece Laurie.

Waters and Captain Peter Blake are concerned with recovering ten stolen repeating rifles and preventing the so-far-peaceful Kiowa from leaving their reservation to join up with the warlike Comanche. Both treat the Kiowa roughly as enemies without concern for their welfare as government wards and human beings. Doctor Seward accompanies Blake to the reservation to recover the rifles and meets a white woman who has become Manyi-ten, and the tribal medicine man, Isatai, gaining compassion for the Kiowa. The woman's son has malaria; Blake tries to prevent Seward from treating him, but Seward does so anyway.

Seward tries to prevent an epidemic and suggests that the Kiowa move off their fetid reservation to the high country. An angry Colonel Waters at first places him under house arrest but then sends him on a combat patrol that is ambushed when the two tribes combine against them. With a number of troopers killed and wounded, the command turns on Seward as a "wood hawk" (traitor). Only Laurie, with a growing compassion for the Kiowa, remains loyal to Seward.

Manyi-ten brings warning of a combined attack on the fort by both the Comanche and Kiowa. The fort is besieged and half of the garrison comes down with malaria. Seward leaves the post to persuade Isatai into making peace but Blake follows in the dark to kill him as a traitor. Instead he shoots Spotted Wolf, the warrior son of Chief Satanta. Seward brings Spotted Wolf back to the fort to operate on him and possibly stop the war. Despite his enmity, the colonel acquiesces in the face of the threat of overwhelming attack. Seward saves Spotted Wolf's life and Satanta calls off the war. Colonel Waters, in turn, vows to do all he can to allow the Kiowa to continue to live peacefully in the high country.

== Cast ==
- Robert Francis as Dr. Allen Seward
- Donna Reed as Laurie MacKaye
- May Wynn as Manyi-ten
- Philip Carey as Capt. Peter Blake (as Phil Carey)
- Onslow Stevens as Col. Ethan Waters
- Peggy Converse as Mrs. Martha Waters
- Roy Roberts as Sgt. Creever
- Jack Kelly as Lt. Raymond
- Stuart Randall as Chief Satanta
- Eugene Iglesias as Red Leaf
- Frank DeKova as Isatai
- John War Eagle as Chief Quanah
- Ralph Dumke as Dr. Gibson
