= The Man Is Armed =

1956 film by Franklin Adreon

- Theatrical release poster
- Directed by: Franklin Adreon
- Written by: Robert C. Dennis; Richard H. Landau
- Story by: Don Martin
- Produced by: Edward J. White
- Starring: Dane Clark; William Talman; May Wynn; Robert Horton
- Cinematography: Bud Thackery
- Edited by: Tony Martinelli
- Music by: R. Dale Butts
- Production company: Republic Pictures
- Distributed by: Republic Pictures
- Release date: October 19, 1956 (United States)
- Running time: 70 minutes
- Country: United States
- Language: English

The Man Is Armed is a 1956 American film noir crime film directed by Franklin Adreon starring Dane Clark, William Talman, May Wynn and Robert Horton. It was produced and distributed by Republic Pictures.

== Plot ==
Framed by another man, truck driver Johnny Morrison serves a year in prison. After his release, Johnny confronts the man, Mitch Mitchell, who plunges off a roof to his death.

Johnny then learns that his former employer, Hackett, was the one who set him up as a fall guy. Hackett claims it was a test of loyalty, and since Johnny passed, he now stands to earn $100,000 for helping Hackett pull off the robbery of an armored transport company.

Johnny's old girlfriend, Carol Wayne, still has feelings for him, even though she has been seeing Mike Benning, a young doctor. While the death of Mitchell is investigated by police Lt. Coster as a homicide, Johnny and three other thugs pull off the heist.

Unable to get the loot to Hackett due to roadblocks, Johnny hides out. Hackett, believing he has been double-crossed, shoots Johnny and buries the money on his family farm, but the police catch up to him. A wounded Johnny knocks out Mike and abducts Carol, but collapses and dies after a few steps. Mike leads Carol away as the cops arrive.

== Cast ==
- Dane Clark as Johnny Morrison
- William Talman as Hackett
- May Wynn as Carol Wayne
- Robert Horton as Dr. Michael Benning
- Barton MacLane as Det. Lt. Dan Coster
- Fredd Wayne as Egan
- Richard Benedict as Lew 'Mitch' Mitchell
- Richard Reeves as Rutberg
- Harry Lewis as Cole
- Bobby Jordan as Thorne
- Larry J. Blake as Ray Perkins
- Darlene Fields as Terrycloth
- John Mitchum as Officer

== See also ==
- List of American films of 1956
