= The White Squaw =

1956 film by Ray Nazarro

- Theatrical release poster
- Directed by: Ray Nazarro
- Screenplay by: Les Savage Jr.
- Based on: The White Squaw by Larabie Sutter
- Produced by: Wallace MacDonald
- Starring: David Brian; May Wynn; William Bishop
- Cinematography: Henry Freulich
- Edited by: Edwin H. Bryant
- Production company: Columbia Pictures
- Distributed by: Columbia Pictures
- Release date: November 1, 1956
- Running time: 73 minutes
- Country: United States
- Language: English

The White Squaw is a 1956 American Western film directed by Ray Nazarro and starring David Brian, May Wynn and William Bishop.

== Plot ==
A Swedish settler starts a war when he tries to drive Dakotas off their Wyoming reservation.

== Cast ==
- David Brian as Sigrod Swanson
- May Wynn as Eetay-O-Wahnee
- William Bishop as Bob Garth
- Nancy Hale as Kerry Arnold
- William Leslie as Thor Swanson
- Myron Healey as Eric Swanson
- Robert C. Ross as Knute Swanson
- Frank DeKova as Yellow Elk
- George Keymas as Yotah
- Roy Roberts as Edward Purvis
- Grant Withers as Sheriff
- Wally Vernon as Faro Bill
