= Protestant Film Commission =

Former American film agency

- Successor: Broadcasting and Film Commission of the National Council of Churches of Christ
- Formation: 1945; 81 years ago
- Dissolved: 1966; 60 years ago
- Purpose: Production and distribution of religious films Consulting agency for Hollywood filmmakers
- Headquarters: New York City
- Location: Los Angeles, California
- Executive director: Paul F. Heard

The Protestant Film Commission, also known as the Protestant Film Office, was an American independent film agency which promoted Protestant religious and moral values in Hollywood cinema. Representing 200,000 American Protestant churches with approximately 34 million members, the Commission was founded in 1945 as a consulting agency for Hollywood film scripts and also provided reviews and ratings for general-market Hollywood films.

Between 1947 and 1955, the Commission produced a series of religious short films and documentaries. These films were distributed to some 30,000 churches as well as schools, clubs, conferences, factories, prisons, and domestic relations courts. Though most of the films were not released commercially, they received positive reviews in the general press for their human-interest stories and dramatic quality. In 1950, the Protestant Film Commission merged with the Protestant Radio Commission to form the Broadcasting and Film Commission (BFC) of the National Council of Churches of Christ, but continued its operations as the de facto West Coast headquarters of the BFC. It ceased operations in 1966.

== Background ==
The Protestant Film Commission was founded partly in response to the dominance of Catholic influence and representation in Hollywood cinema in the 1940s. The Production Code Administration, which together with the Catholic National Legion of Decency imposed film standards emphasizing positive social values and respect for religion, had an official Catholic adviser in Hollywood but not a Protestant one. As a general rule, the Protestant church leadership limited its involvement with Hollywood filmmaking to confirming technical details of church theology and practices.

However, the increasingly sympathetic portrayal of Catholic characters in films—including The Song of Bernadette, The Keys of the Kingdom, Going My Way, and The Bells of St. Mary's— combined with the tendency for Hollywood to depict Protestant characters as fodder for laughs, motivated Protestant leadership to improve their standing and representation in Hollywood. Additionally, the bold treatment of sex in Hollywood films of the era, which produced "quite a galaxy of predatory females and philandering males", was seen as evidence that Hollywood screenwriters and producers were not paying attention to the negative film reviews in Protestant publications such as the Christian Herald.

== History ==
In 1945, the Protestant Film Commission (PFC) was established by the boards of 19 of the largest American Protestant denominations together with 12 major interdenominational agencies, including the Federal Council of Churches. In this capacity, it represented 200,000 Protestant churches which numbered approximately 34 million members.

The PFC convened in January 1946, with Paul F. Heard as executive director. Heard had previously overseen the production of government training and propaganda films for the Bureau of Naval Personnel in Washington, D.C. The PFC defined its goals as twofold:

- to produce and distribute drama and documentary films suitable for viewing in churches, schools, and other religious organizations
- to promote the adoption of Protestant values and religious themes in the Hollywood film industry

As most films screened in churches required 16 mm film projectors, the PFC issued a booklet titled Teaching Eternal Truths, which educated church organizers on the fundamentals of operating film projectors and scheduling film programs.

Unlike the National Legion of Decency, which was a censorship body, the PFC provided a voluntary consulting service to fact-check scripts and give Hollywood filmmakers input on "the dramatic possibilities of religious material and of constructive moral themes". The PFC also issued reviews and ratings of general-market films which were printed in the Christian Herald.

In 1948, in advance of the June 15 release of its second film production, My Name Is Han, the PFC issued a statement emphasizing the value of motion pictures for conveying religious themes—an about-face from the church's previous stance on films:

"Gone is the concept that the movies are necessarily the work of the devil. In its place has come the realization that the camera, under proper guidance, can inspire men to lead Christian lives, can instruct the young and offer solace and hope to the aged".

In 1948, the PFC established a permanent West Coast office under the directorship of Oren W. Evans, with headquarters at Nassour Studios. At that time, the PFC announced that it had 19 films slated for production, including 9 short films on mental health, 5 films promoting good citizenship, and 3 films based on stories from the Bible.

In December 1950, the PFC merged with the Protestant Radio Commission to form the Broadcasting and Film Commission (BFC) of the National Council of Churches of Christ. Heard was named director of films in the new organizational structure. However, the PFC continued to operate as the de facto West Coast office of the BFC. The PFC ceased operations in 1966.

== Film production ==
In 1947 the PFC announced that it had raised $250,000 in funds to produce seven films in 16 mm and 35 mm format for noncommercial release, with the intended audiences being churches, clubs, conferences, factories, prisons, and domestic relations courts. The PFC would go on to produce and distribute a series of drama, documentary, and educational films between December 1947 and April 1955. Each original script employed human-interest plots and dramatic devices to engage viewers while conveying religious and moral messages. The PFC raised its production budgets through fund-raising campaigns among Protestant denominational churches and interdenominational sponsorships. Its 1949 film Prejudice, for example, was sponsored by 17 Protestant denominations as well as the Anti-Defamation League of B'nai B'rith. The PFC was said to have had an "excellent" chance of recouping its production expenses, since at the time between 25,000 and 50,000 churches were screening films as part of their educational efforts, compared to 18,000 commercial movie theaters.

The PFC's first production, Beyond Our Own (1947), received a positive reception both from church groups and the general press for its dramatic quality and high production values. It was screened both domestically and abroad in scores of churches. A 1948 news item reported that the PFC had already gained a 25-percent profit on the film's $100,000 production budget, and had returned the initial investment plus half of the profits to its sponsors. By 1949 the PFC had raised $1.5 million in funds for production budgets and $1 million for distribution of future films.

The PFC steered toward humanitarian rather than theological themes in its productions, in keeping with the postwar focus on social issues among most churches. Film scripts were sought on racial discrimination, religious intolerance, and mental health. The PFC also invested in professional crews and equipment, and used name actors as well as unknown performers. For example, it invested more than $80,000 to produce Again Pioneers (1950) starring Colleen Townsend, Tom Powers, Sarah Padden, and Regis Toomey. A Wonderful Life (1950) starred James Dunn, who had won the Academy Award for Best Supporting Actor five years earlier. Hollywood box office star Glenn Ford served as narrator for City Story (1950).

In 1950 the PFC released a series of "curriculum enrichment" films for church schools, including A Job for Bob, What Happened to Jo Jo?, and Birthday Party. This series was funded by Protestant denominational churches as well as the International Council of Religious Education.

Principal photography for PFC productions generally took place either in New York or Southern California to enable filmmakers access to professional equipment from the major Hollywood studios. However, some projects were filmed overseas in conjunction with other production units, such as My Name Is Han (1948), filmed in China, Kenji Comes Home (1949), filmed in Japan, and South of the Clouds (1950), filmed in Lebanon. American director William Beaudine was tapped to direct eleven of the PFC's short films. His directorial style, which delivered strong but not heavy-handed films, was seen as ideal for conveying religious messages.

Each film had its premiere in 100 cities in the U.S. and Canada. The films were distributed to Congregational Christian Churches, Presbyterian Church U.S.A., Evangelical churches, and Reformed churches, with a reach estimated at some 30,000 churches. They were also available for viewing by clubs, conferences, factories, prisons, and domestic relations courts.

While most PFC films were not released commercially, they received favorable mention in the general press. In its preview of Beyond Our Own, the Dayton Daily News wrote: "Though no Academy Award Oscars will be given for the performances of the stars, the actors and actresses are thoroughly convincing". Syndicated Hollywood columnist Jimmie Fidler wrote:

These pictures may be modestly budgeted, they may lack the impressive sets and extra "mobs" to be found in some of the major studio products, but they are entertainment that goes straight to the heart and the mind, a "solid" sort of entertainment that leaves one in a state of real appreciation for days after he has seen them. They say something that's worth saying—and that, in the final analysis, is worth more than "production value" or big star names.

== Selected filmography ==
=== Feature films ===
- Beyond Our Own (1947)
- My Name Is Han (1948)
- Prejudice (1949)
- Kenji Comes Home (1949)
- Second Chance (1950)
- Again Pioneers (1950)
- South of the Clouds (1950)
- Wings to the Word (1951)
- A Wonderful Life (1951)
- The Congregation (1952)
- For Every Child (1953)
- City Story (1954)
- The Hidden Heart (1954)
- The Beginning (1955)
- Each According to His Faith (1955)
- Hong Kong Affair (1958)
- The Secret of the Gift (1959)

=== Curriculum enrichment films ===
- A Job for Bob (1950)
- What Happened to Jo Jo? (1950)
- Birthday Party (1950)

== Sources ==
- International Television Almanac. Quigley Publishing Company. 1982. ISBN 9780900610271.
- Lindvall, Terry; Quicke, Andrew (2011). Celluloid Sermons: The Emergence of the Christian Film Industry, 1930-1986. NYU Press. ISBN 9780814753248.
- Quicke, Andrew (2009), "The Era of Censorship (1930 – 1967)", in Lyden, John (ed.), The Routledge Companion to Religion and Film, Routledge, ISBN 9781135220662
- Marshall, Wendy L. (2005). William Beaudine: From Silents to Television. Scarecrow Press. ISBN 9780810852181.
- Romanowski, William D. (2012). Reforming Hollywood: How American Protestants Fought for Freedom at the Movies. Oxford University Press. ISBN 9780199969180.
- Stone, Bryan (2009), "Modern Protestant Approaches to Film (1960 to the Present)", in Lyden, John (ed.), The Routledge Companion to Religion and Film, Routledge, ISBN 9781135220662
