= South of the Clouds (1950 film) =

Documentary film on Protestant missionary work

- Directed by: William James
- Written by: Charles Schwepp (scenario); Alan Shilin (narration)
- Produced by: Paul F. Heard
- Starring: Daad Terazi; Nadia Abuhaidar
- Cinematography: William James
- Distributed by: Religious Film Association
- Release date: 1950
- Running time: 30 minutes
- Country: United States
- Language: English

South of the Clouds is a 1950 black and white short documentary film produced by the Protestant Film Commission. Filmed on the campus of the Beirut College for Women, it depicts the progress made by Christian missionary education in the Near East. The story focuses on a Muslim young woman from an aristocratic family who rooms with an orphan Lebanese Christian girl at the college and broadens her personal outlook through education, Christian fellowship, and community service. The film was developed in response to a request by Protestant mission boards functioning under the Missionary Education Movement to assist in their promotion of overseas missionary education. It was distributed through the Religious Film Association for rental to denominational churches throughout the United States.

== Synopsis ==
Through voice-over narration, Najla, a sheltered girl from an aristocratic Muslim family in Damascus, retells her desire to go to college and her traditional family's grudging acquiescence. Najla immediately feels out of place when she arrives at the Beirut College for Women and witnesses the lack of formality, the democratic milieu of a student body composed of girls from all religions and nationalities, the easy camaraderie between girls and boys, and the outgoing personality of her roommate, a Lebanese Christian orphan named Suad who has been raised by her grandmother. Najla immerses herself in her studies and slowly gets used to fellowship activities with the other students.

Najla is again perturbed when the girls travel to a village to help doctors attend to the sick and needy. Najla feels she is unable to relate to others' suffering because of her privileged family background, but Suad encourages her that God wants her to help others. Najla's feelings begin to change when she interacts with underprivileged yet happy children in a neighborhood program. She decides to join Suad as a volunteer in the village during the summer and, while Suad teaches young children, Najla discovers her talents as a nurse. She prays with the rest of the volunteers under the guidance of the pastor and feels a commonality with them. She muses that while she used to live "in the clouds", enjoying a life of privilege, she has discovered life "south of the clouds", interacting with other people and trying to meet their needs. On graduation day, when Najla's and Suad's families come to see them receive their diplomas, Suad receives word that she has won a scholarship to study in the United States. The headman of the village reminds Suad of her promise to teach in the village after graduation, and Najla decides to take Suad's place.

== Cast ==
- Daad Terazi as Najla
- Nadia Abuhaidar as Suad
- Saida Albekri as Narrator

== Production ==
=== Development ===
South of the Clouds was developed in response to a request by Protestant mission boards functioning under the Missionary Education Movement to assist in its promotion of overseas missionary education. The Division of Audio Visual Education of the Board of Foreign Missions of the Presbyterian Church of the United States of America assisted in the production.

The script focuses on the activities of a Christian college in the Near East—the Beirut College for Women—and its introduction of "modern democratic ways of thinking and living" to a student body composed of girls from all religions, nationalities, and economic circumstances, including Christians, Jews, and Muslims. The main character is a Muslim girl for whom the democratic milieu of the college is a stark departure from her own upbringing, though over time she learns to embrace it.

=== Casting ===
The production employed native actors and actresses. Upon the showing of the film at the Second Presbyterian Church in Carlisle, Pennsylvania, church members spotted one of their own who was working at the Beirut College for Women in one of the scenes.

=== Filming ===
Filming took place on location in Beirut, Lebanon. Scenes filmed on the campus of the Beirut College for Women were done under the supervision of W. A. Stoltzfus, president of the college. The documentary takes up one film reel and is 30 minutes in length. It was produced in a 16 mm format.

== Release ==
The film was released in 1950. It was not released commercially, but was available for rental to Protestant denominational churches in the United States. The release coincided with the church's 1950–1951 foreign mission study which stressed the Near East region. According to Lindvall and Quicke, the film was promoted by the Christian Film Service as part of a Southern Baptist effort to familiarize their denominations with missionary education efforts underway in foreign countries.

== Reception ==
South of the Clouds was named best in its class at the 1950 Cleveland Film Festival.

The Presbyterian Church of the United States of America reported that South of the Clouds was the most popular film among church rentals in 1951, with 462 rentals recorded.

== Sources ==
- Lindvall, Terry; Quicke, Andrew (2011). Celluloid Sermons: The Emergence of the Christian Film Industry, 1930–1986. NYU Press. ISBN 9780814753248.
