= Again Pioneers =

- Directed by: William Beaudine
- Written by: Oviatt McConnell (original screenplay); Alan Shilin (additional sequences)
- Produced by: Paul F. Heard
- Starring: Colleen Townsend; Tom Powers; Sarah Padden; Regis Toomey
- Cinematography: Marcel Le Picard
- Edited by: Albrecht Joseph
- Music by: Irving Gertz
- Distributed by: Religious Film Association
- Release date: 6 November 1950
- Running time: 68 minutes
- Country: United States
- Language: English
- Budget: $80,000

Again Pioneers (sometimes referred to as Again... Pioneers!) is a 1950 American black-and-white short drama film produced by Paul F. Heard for the Protestant Film Commission. Directed by William Beaudine, it stars Colleen Townsend, Tom Powers, Sarah Padden, and Regis Toomey. The story is set in the fictional town of Fairview and depicts the friction between the middle-class residents and the impoverished migrants who live on the outskirts in a shantytown called "The Patch". The film explores the meaning of the American Dream for both types of residents, and the responsibility of the church to reinstill Christian values of human dignity and freedom into American life. The film was produced at the request of the Home Missions Council of North America. It was not released commercially, but was distributed to 30,000 Protestant denominational churches in the United States.

== Plot ==
Ken Keeler, a prominent attorney, believes along with other leading citizens of Fairview that the families of "The Patch", a migrant shantytown on the outskirts of the town, should not be encouraged to stay. When a proposal is made that the migrant children should be allowed to attend school in the town, a citizens' meeting goes into an uproar. The town doctor warns that with the lack of sanitation and prevalence of disease in the migrant camp, the whole town will be infected by such a move. Ken's daughter Sallie, a member of a church youth group that conducts classes for the migrants and fights for their rights, insists that the town should reach out and help their poorer neighbors like good Christians, but hers is a lone voice. The citizens' committee appoints Ken to find a solution and to report back in two weeks.

Meanwhile, a new migrant family has arrived in The Patch. The mother, Ma Ashby, is hopeful about her husband finding work and the family becoming part of the community, but they are shunned by the townsfolk and taken advantage of by the owner of the dilapidated shack. The Ashby family attempts to attend church on Sunday, but they are stared at by the more well-dressed townsfolk and when they finally reach the steps, the church door is closed on them.

Inside the church, Ken struggles with his conscience, hearing both the minister's sermon about helping one's neighbor and his neighbors’ invective against the migrants. After the service, Ken accepts a ride from Christian missionary Dave Harley, who takes him on a trip of discovery to show him what is really happening in America of 1950. He shows Ken the squalid shantytown and also the acres of shiny new housing developments built for the huge numbers of people seeking to put down roots. These modern developments lack any sign of a church, and so are losing touch with the Christian values on which America was founded. Back at the Keeler home, Ken's son Kenny invites his new friend Nathaniel Ashby to join his baseball team, but his teammates make fun of the migrant boy and Kenny's older brother Malcolm throws Nathaniel off their premises. When Ken finds out he is livid, and goes to apologize to the Ashby family. Seeing the squalor in which they live, he wants to give them a check, but Ma Ashby refuses to take charity. Instead, she asks him to join them at their Sunday church meeting in the shantytown, and Ken and Sallie attend.

Ken reports back to the citizens' committee that instead of throwing out the migrants, they should help them. Sallie listens with pride as Ken sets forth his plan of action. Even though the town is slowly warming to Ken's ideas, the final scene shows the Ashby family on the move again, hoping that the next town they come to will be welcoming. Ma Ashby's voice is heard intoning Psalm 23, "The Lord is my Shepherd", as the film fades out.

== Themes ==
The film promotes the "Methodist theme of duty to the underprivileged", and also the idea that "charity in missions begins at home". The concept of the American Dream is examined in both its moral and materialistic meanings. Allusions to communism as a threat to the American Dream are also found in the script.

The film and its title make the comparison between the waves of American pioneers who traversed the country by covered wagon in search of new frontiers, and the estimated 70 million modern-day Americans who are constantly on the move in search of jobs. The film asserts that American society was founded on the Christian values of human dignity and freedom, but "the Christian aspect is withering principally because the church as a whole has lost its outreach".

== Cast ==
- Colleen Townsend as Sallie Keeler
- Tom Powers as Ken Keeler
- Sarah Padden as Ma Ashby
- Regis Toomey as Dave Harley
- Jimmy Hunt as Nathaniel
- Evelyn Brent as Alice Keeler
- Larry Olsen as Kenny Keeler
- Larry Carr as Malcolm Keeler
- Erville Alderson as Pa Ashby
- Peggy Wynne as Arla Ashby
- Melinda Plowman as Rebecca Ashby

== Production ==
=== Development ===
Again Pioneers was developed at the request of the Home Missions Council of North America. The film was intended to "provide inspiration for home missions work by the churches". The original screenplay by Oviatt McConnell included additional sequences by Alan Shilin.

=== Casting ===
The production tapped a number of notable film and stage actors. Heading the cast is Colleen Townsend, who had left her Hollywood film career and was studying theology at Pasadena College; this was her first appearance in a religious film. Other notable performers are Tom Power, Sarah Padden, Regis Toomey, and Evelyn Brent. This was Brent's last film.

=== Filming ===
Filming took place at MGM Studios and Nassour Studios in Los Angeles. Director William Beaudine typically completed principal photography on films for the Protestant Film Commission in under a week.

The production budget was $80,000. Fourteen Protestant denominations provided the funding.

== Release ==
Again Pioneers was released on November 6, 1950, in 100 cities. It was not released commercially, but was distributed to denominational churches, with an eventual reach of 30,000 churches.

== Critical reception ==
Hollywood syndicated columnist Jimmie Fidler mentioned the film in two separate columns. In early November 1950, Fidler wrote that after attending a preview of the film:

I haven't been able to get it out of mind since. Its emotional sock is terrific ... It is precisely the kind of picture that countless millions have been searching for in their theaters—and failing to find. It is also proof positive of the truth inherent in that often-voiced claim that the screen can be the greatest of all educational mediums.

A few weeks later, Fidler wrote that he had sought the reason why the film had "left an indelible impression on my mind". He reported that the film's technical director, Dr. Frederick Thorne, an ordained Presbyterian minister, had personally traveled to a migrant shantytown in Bakersfield, California, and lived among the residents in order to provide factual details for the script. Fidler concluded: "It's amazing to me that more studios do not insist on original research. At least half of Hollywood's sub-par product, in my opinion, can be charged off to the fact that the screenplays are written by men who have had little or no personal experience with the conditions about which they are obliged to write".

The Cincinnati Enquirer called the film "definitely educational propaganda", with typecast characterizations that were "convincing albeit obviously mechanical". Yet this review commended the filmmakers for basically telling the church denominations that sponsored the production that they "are not doing their jobs". It elaborated:

Churchgoers are not fighting barriers of hate, suspicion, fear of economic competition, mountains of exploitation, race prejudice and other powerful, if not physical, obstacles new pioneers face.... But if the American dream is to be fought for and maintained, obstacles must be overcome by restoring to all belief in the church-contributed spiritual base of the dream—belief in equal rights, freedom and dignity of all individuals as children of God.

Lindvall and Quicke note that the film employs the same "parallel editing" style pioneered by D. W. Griffith to contrast the lifestyle of the middle-class Keeler family with that of the poor migrant Ashby family.

== Sources ==
- Lindvall, Terry; Quicke, Andrew (2011). Celluloid Sermons: The Emergence of the Christian Film Industry, 1930–1986. NYU Press. ISBN 9780814753248.
- Marshall, Wendy L. (2005). William Beaudine: From Silents to Television. Scarecrow Press. ISBN 9780810852181.
