= Day of the Outlaw =

- Theatrical release poster
- Directed by: Andre de Toth
- Written by: Philip Yordan
- Based on: Day of the Outlaw by Lee Wells
- Produced by: Sidney Harmon
- Starring: Robert Ryan; Burl Ives; Tina Louise
- Cinematography: Russell Harlan
- Edited by: Robert Lawrence
- Music by: Alexander Courage
- Production company: Security Pictures
- Distributed by: United Artists
- Release date: 1959
- Running time: 92 minutes
- Country: United States
- Language: English
- Budget: $400,000 or $1.1 million

Day of the Outlaw is a 1959 American Western film starring Robert Ryan, Burl Ives, and Tina Louise. It was directed by Andre de Toth; this was de Toth's final Western feature film.

== Plot ==
Blaise Starrett is a ruthless cattleman who helped found the small, bleak community of Bitters, Wyoming. He is at odds with homesteaders who, having established new farms in the area, have taken to putting up barbed wire to keep their livestock from wandering. Starrett is particularly aggrieved with Hal Crane, who not only inspired this use of barbed wire, but is also married to Helen, the woman Starrett loves. In spite of the fact that Helen has told him she can never love him if he carries out his threat to murder her husband, Starrett sets his mind on doing just that.

The stage is set for a final, bloody showdown when into town rides Jack Bruhn, an ex-Army captain, and his band of rogue cavalrymen. This gang holds the town hostage while Bruhn, wounded in a recent bank robbery, receives treatment. Realizing that they would have no qualms about wiping Bitters out, Starrett tries to save his town. He takes the gang out into the desolate landscape, ostensibly to help them escape across the snow-covered mountains.

== Cast ==
- Robert Ryan as Blaise Starrett
- Burl Ives as Jack Bruhn
- Tina Louise as Helen Crane
- Alan Marshal as Hal Crane
- Venetia Stevenson as Ernine, Vic's daughter
- David Nelson as Gene, a member of Bruhn's gang
- Nehemiah Persoff as Dan, Starret's Foreman
- Jack Lambert as Tex, a member of Bruhn's gang
- Lance Fuller as Pace, a member of Bruhn's gang
- Frank de Kova as Denver, a member of Bruhn's gang (as Frank deKova)
- Elisha Cook Jr. as Larry Teter, town barber (as Elisha Cook)
- Dabbs Greer as Doc Langer, veterinarian
- Betsy Jones-Moreland as Mrs. Preston (as Betsey Jones-Moreland)
- Helen Westcott as Vivian
- Paul Wexler as Vause
- Michael McGreevey as Bobby

== Production ==
The film was based on a 1955 novel of the same title by Lee Edwin Wells (1907-1982), that also ran in several newspapers as a serialized story in the fall of 1955 and others in the late summer 1956.

Producer Buddy Adler originally purchased the film rights as a vehicle for Robert Wagner.

Philip Yordan read the novel and insisted on writing a script based on the book. Filming took place in central Oregon at Dutchman Flat and Todd Lake Meadows near the town of Bend in late November and early December 1958, with Leon Chooluck, the second unit director, doing many of the long exterior shots.

Yordan called the script "one of the best I've ever written," but said the problem with the film was that the budget, at $400,000, was not big enough. Yordan told author Franklin Jarlett, in his biographical book about Robert Ryan, that de Toth was having personal problems at the time of filming and it was apparent on the set. Other problems included Ryan's being out for a week with pneumonia; snowstorms causing delays in filming; de Toth's changing his mind about where some scenes were to be shot (from interior to remote exteriors); and finally de Toth's running out of money, packing up, and going back to Hollywood. Yordan lamented what "could have been."

== Reception ==
Roger Horrocks, in his book Male Myths and Icons, says that the film is a 'gold nugget' and on par with the Westerns of Budd Boetticher.
