= Elsa Buchanan =

English actress (1908–2004)

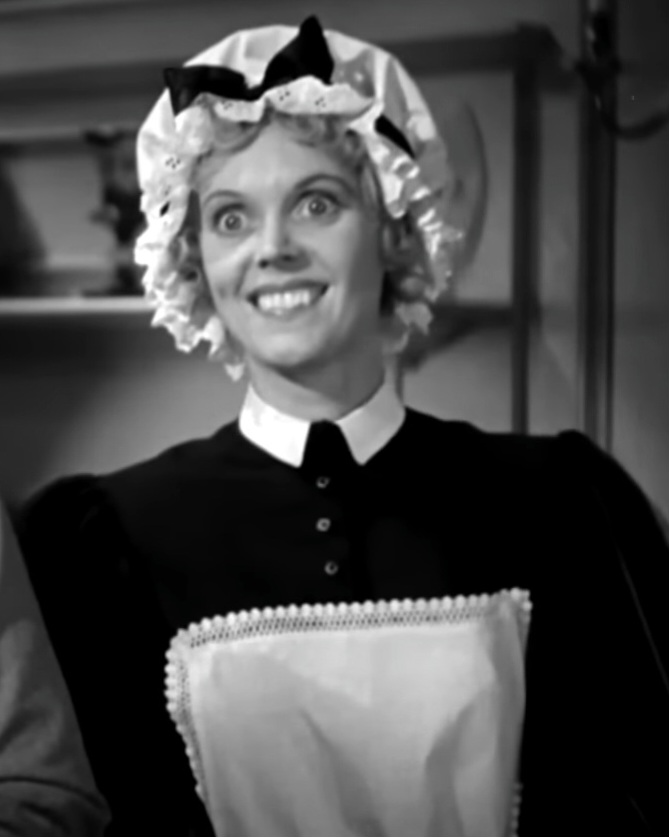
- Buchanan in Little Lord Fauntleroy (1936)
- Born: Elsie Winifred Buchanan Tinker; 22 December 1908; London, England, UK
- Died: 17 January 2004 (aged 95); Childswickham, Worcestershire, UK
- Occupation: Actress
- Years active: 1912–1938
- Spouse: Noll Charlton (1938–1966) (his death)

Elsa Buchanan (22 December 1908 – 17 January 2004) was an English character actress with a brief career in theatre and film.

Born Elsie Winifred Buchanan Tinker, Buchanan made her stage debut at age three at the Palace Theatre, London at a performance attended by Queen Mary. Buchanan was later the first Briton admitted to the training school of the Académie Française.

She made seventeen films in the United States, where she was noted for her blonde hair and called "the girl with the largest eyes and the smallest waist in Hollywood." She accepted the proposal of her husband, a merchant sailor named Noll Charlton, while attending a coronation ball for King George VI and retired from film thereafter.

Shortly before her death, she saw Gosford Park, in which one of the characters, a Hollywood producer, discusses casting for Charlie Chan in London, inviting a blonde maid to audition for the part that she actually played in that film.

== Filmography ==
Year	Title	Role	Notes
1934	Riptide	Daphne	Uncredited
1934	Charlie Chan in London	Alice Rooney	
1934	The Little Minister	Villager	Uncredited
1935	The Mystery of Edwin Drood	Mrs. Tisher	
1935	Here's to Romance	Enid	
1935	Peter Ibbetson	Madame Pasquier	
1935	I Found Stella Parish	Stella's Maid	Uncredited
1935	A Tale of Two Cities	Candy Clerk	Uncredited
1935	Sylvia Scarlett	Minor Role	Uncredited
1936	Little Lord Fauntleroy	Susan	
1936	Love on the Run	English Department Store Girl	Uncredited
1936	Lloyd's of London	Servant Girl	
1937	Ready, Willing and Able	Maid at Party	Uncredited
1937	Call It a Day	Vera, the Maid	Uncredited
1937	Song of the Forge		Uncredited
1937	The Thirteenth Chair	Miss Stanby	
1937	The Dark Stairway		Uncredited
1938	Invisible Enemy	Sophia	(final film role)
