= Kenji Comes Home =

1949 film

- Directed by: Charles F. Schwep
- Written by: Charles F. Schwep
- Produced by: Paul F. Heard
- Distributed by: Protestant Film Commission
- Release date: 1949
- Country: United States
- Language: English

Kenji Comes Home is a 1949 documentary film produced by Paul F. Heard. Written and directed by Charles F. Schwep, it was filmed on location in Japan and employed native actors. The film was nominated for an Academy Award for Best Documentary Feature.
