= Prejudice (1949 film) =

American drama film by Edward L. Cahn

- Directed by: Edward L. Cahn
- Written by: Jarvis Couillard (story and screenplay); Ivan Goff (screenplay); Ben Roberts (screenplay)
- Produced by: Protestant Film Commission; Edmund L. Dorfmann Productions, Inc.
- Starring: David Bruce; Mary Marshall; Tommy Ivo; Bruce Edwards
- Cinematography: Jackson Rose
- Edited by: Philip Cahn
- Music by: Irving Gertz
- Distributed by: Religious Film Association; Motion Picture Sales Corp.
- Release date: 17 October 1949
- Running time: 57 minutes
- Country: United States
- Language: English
- Budget: $100,000

Prejudice is a 1949 American black-and-white drama film produced by the Protestant Film Commission (PFC) and Edmund L. Dorfmann Productions. Directed by Edward L. Cahn, it stars David Bruce, Mary Marshall, Tommy Ivo, and Bruce Edwards. The story centers on an American Protestant man who believes he is tolerant of other religions and nationalities, but feels threatened by his Jewish colleague. As the film delves into the reasons for prejudice, he and other main characters realize that they are both perpetrators and victims of intolerance. The film concludes that only with faith in Christ, who loved all men equally, can prejudice be eliminated.

This was the first PFC production to be released theatrically; it was also distributed to 30,000 denominational churches and schools, religious clubs, and unions in the United States and Canada. The $100,000 production budget was funded by 17 Protestant denominations and the Anti-Defamation League of B'nai B'rith. The film was said to be the "most popular" of the PFC's productions.

== Plot ==
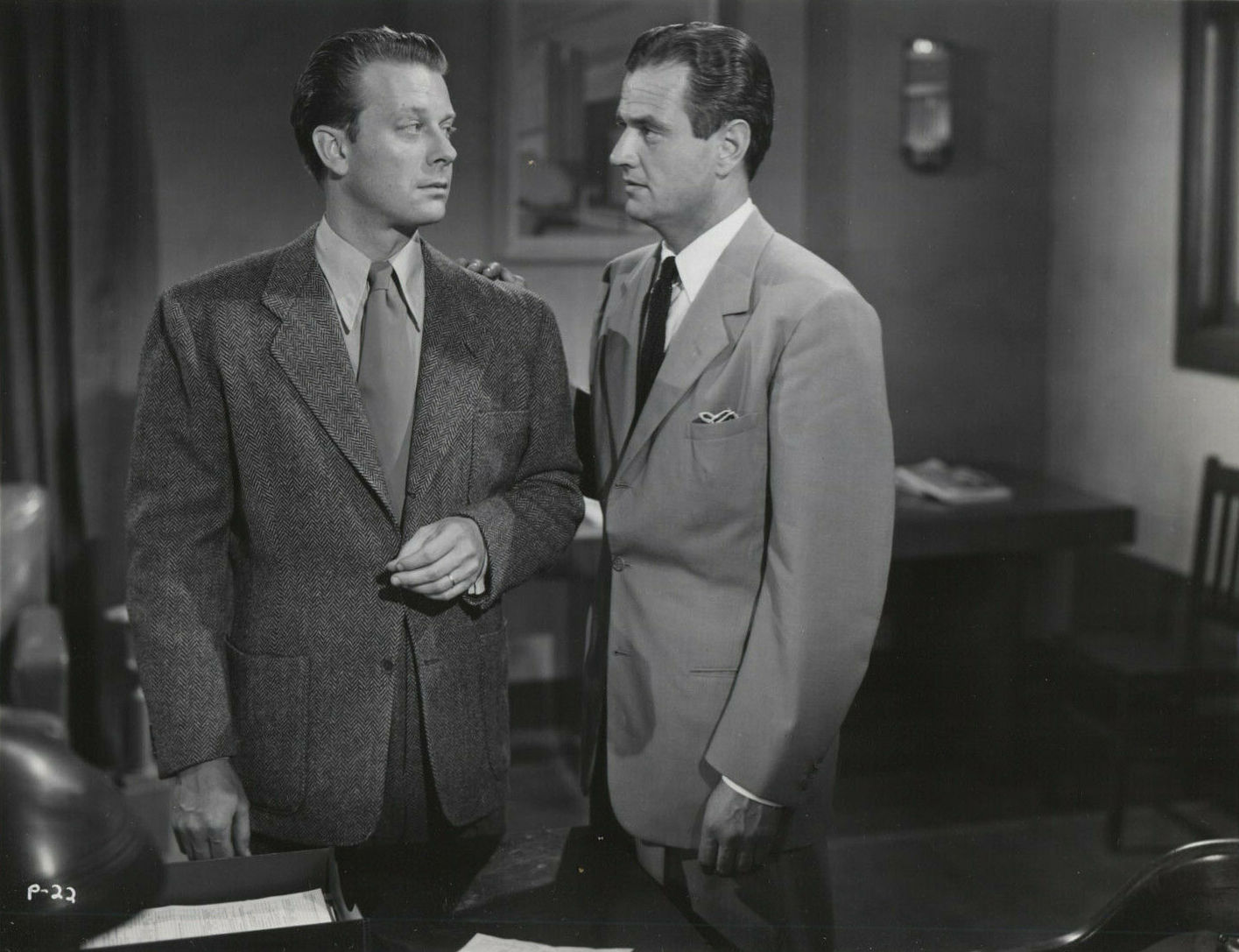
Co-workers Joe Hanson (David Bruce) (left) and Al Green (Bruce Edwards) in their office

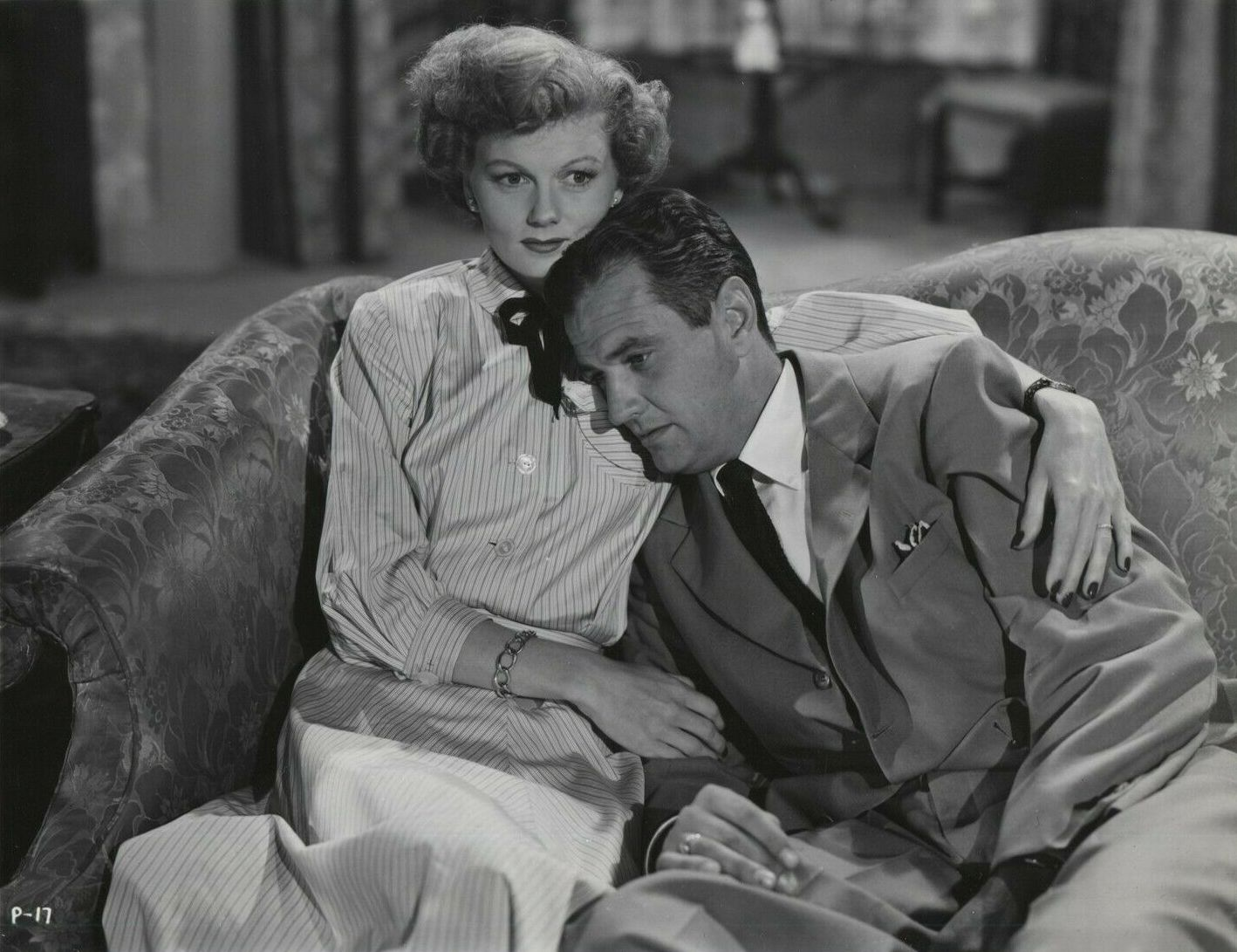
Doris Green (Barbara Billingsley) comforts her husband Al (Bruce Edwards) after he is transferred because he is Jewish

Joe, Beth, and Joey Hanson settle into their new home in Springville, where Joe has found a job as production manager for the Baker company, and befriend their neighbors, the Greens. When Joe reports for work, he discovers that Al Green has been running the division until his arrival and, if Joe determines him fit, will earn a permanent position. Joe gives Al a lift home and when his car is blocked by the stalled car of a black man, they hear derisive calls of "nigger" from other drivers. Joe tells Al that he is a Scandinavian-American Protestant and is not prejudiced toward anyone. Al reveals that he is Jewish and often encounters intolerance. At home, Joe tells Beth that her new friends are Jewish and she should be careful what she says about them. When Joey asks, "What's wrong with Jews?" Joe tells him they are just like any other people.

Pamphlets warning against the influence of "Negros, Jews and foreigners" appear in the town and the minister delivers a sermon urging his congregants to treat others with brotherhood and love. At work, Joe begins to feel that the talented Al is going to take over his job. He begins putting in a lot of overtime to take care of everything himself.

During a home visit from the minister, Joey comes in after a fight, saying that he and his friends beat some "wops". Joe is horrified by Joey's behavior, wondering where it came from. The minister explains that prejudicial attitudes begin in childhood, and urges Joe to think of his own youthful experiences. Joe now remembers his mother complaining about foreigners competing for his father's job, and how he also lost a delivery route to a Jewish boy. He further remembers being tackled by a Jewish classmate in a football game and being convinced by the others that the "dirty Jew" cheated. The minister now explains to Joe that all prejudice and scapegoating stem from personal insecurity and fear.

When Joe's boss asks him about Al's work performance, Joe replies that although he himself doesn't feel this way, others in the company might not be comfortable working with a Jew. The boss decides to transfer Al to another division for the good of the company. In the Green home, Al's wife consoles him but he maintains that Jews will always suffer prejudice. Meanwhile, in the Hanson home, Beth realizes to her horror that Joe had something to do with Al's transfer. Joey comes in crying that other children are calling him a "dumb Swede". Joe realizes that prejudice is everywhere, and can play both ways.

The minister delivers another sermon in which he advises that to overcome prejudice, one must strengthen his faith in Christ, who loves all men equally. This will imbue him with personal security and dignity, and eliminate his fear of others. Joe drops off Joey and Ellen Green at their school and watches a group of children taunt Ellen, calling her "Jew". Joe drives away with conflicted feelings, hearing the minister's words in his head. Finally he works up the nerve to admit his prejudicial statement to his boss and ask him to reinstate Green as his assistant.

== Cast ==
- David Bruce as Joe Hanson
- Mary Marshall as Beth Hanson
- Tommy Ivo as Joey Hanson
- Bruce Edwards as Al Green
- Barbara Billingsley as Doris Green
- James Seay as minister
- Joseph Crehan as J. P. Baker
- Sharon McManus as Ellen Green

== Production ==
=== Development ===
Prejudice was the third film released by the Protestant Film Commission (PFC), established in 1945. The $100,000 production budget was underwritten by 17 Protestant denominations and the Anti-Defamation League of B'nai B'rith.

The script, from an original story by Jarvis Couillard, drives its point home by having characters use many ethnic slurs, including "nigger", "wops", "dagoes", "dirty Jew", and "dumb Swede".

=== Casting ===
The cast largely consisted of established film actors. This was the film debut of Mary Marshall, ex-wife of actor Alan Marshall.

=== Filming ===
Filming began on August 9, 1948, at Nassour Studios in Los Angeles.

== Release ==
On October 17, 1949, the film had its New York premiere at Town Hall in Manhattan under the sponsorship of the Protestant Council of the City of New York. The opening included speeches by "representatives of the three major faiths and Negro groups". The film simultaneously premiered in London, with sales and distribution of 35-mm prints for theatrical release handled by the Motion Picture Sales Corporation. On October 18, the film had its non-theatrical premiere in 100 churches in the United States and Canada. 16-mm prints were subsequently made available for rent to approximately 30,000 denominational churches in the United States and Canada, schools, religious clubs, and unions.

According to the New York Daily News, Prejudice was the first film produced under "exclusively religious auspices to receive commercial distribution".

== Reception ==
Lindvall and Quicke quote a contemporary review by N. F. Forsyth which stated, "Whether the person involved is a Jew, Negro, Swede or person of any other national background, he both displays and is in turn the object of prejudice. … While audiences will find it interesting enough, it will not be a pleasant picture to see". Daily Variety predicted that the film "will prove acceptable fare in churches, clubs, schools, etc. When it comes to selling it to theatres, however, distributors will likely bump into the answer 'another film which tries to capitalize on intolerance'".

Variety was critical of the script and pacing, stating that it "suffers from punching too hard, too directly and too repetitiously. The story elements are developed without plausibility, serving only as an obvious peg for several long sermons which are used as a substitute for dramatic situations. General production values also suffer paradoxically from a slickness which lessens the impression of sincerity".

Prejudice was later said to be the "most popular" film released by the PFC. It continued to be shown to both Christian and Jewish audiences for several years. In 1951, for example, a free screening followed by an interdenominational panel discussion, sponsored by the Anti-Defamation League with invitations extended to the public and members of 200 organizations, was held in New Brunswick, New Jersey, in conjunction with Brotherhood Week. That same year, the film arrived in Australia through the Australian Religious Films Society, which planned to distribute it to church and other non-Jewish organizations.

== Sources ==
- Lindvall, Terry; Quicke, Andrew (2011). Celluloid Sermons: The Emergence of the Christian Film Industry, 1930–1986. NYU Press. ISBN 9780814753248.
