= I Found Stella Parish =

1935 film by Mervyn LeRoy

- Lobby card
- Directed by: Mervyn LeRoy
- Written by: Casey Robinson; John Monk Saunders
- Produced by: Harry Joe Brown
- Starring: Kay Francis; Ian Hunter; Paul Lukas
- Cinematography: Sidney Hickox
- Edited by: William Clemens
- Music by: Heinz Roemheld
- Production company: Warner Bros. Pictures
- Distributed by: Warner Bros. Pictures
- Release date: November 16, 1935
- Running time: 85 minutes
- Country: United States
- Language: English

I Found Stella Parish is a 1935 American melodrama film directed by Mervyn LeRoy and starring Kay Francis, Ian Hunter and Paul Lukas. It was produced by Warner Bros. Pictures and shot at the company's Burbank Studios. Francis plays a celebrated actress whose dark secret is revealed to the world.

== Plot ==
In London, Stella Parish delivers her greatest stage triumph in a play produced and directed by Stephen Norman. However, she finds a man from her past in her dressing room. Determined not to submit to his blackmail, she books passage back to the U.S. on an ocean liner, traveling in disguise with her young daughter Gloria and her friend and confidante Nana.

Hotshot newspaper reporter Keith Lockridge befriends the trio on the sea voyage and renews his acquaintance with Stella, who seeks anonymity, when in New York. As weeks pass, Stella falls in love with him. Meanwhile, Keith discovers that Stella is a former actress with a troubled past. Her alcoholic, jealous husband had killed her co-star and maliciously implicated her in the crime. She served time in prison, where Gloria was born. When Stella was released, she resolved to bury her past for Gloria's sake.

Stella tells Keith that she loves him and recounts her entire history. However, Keith had wired the story to his editor several hours earlier. His frantic efforts to suppress the article are too late, and his newspaper publishes the story.

When Stella is besieged by reporters, she decides to exploit the situation to raise the money that she needs to take care of her child. She sends Gloria and Nana away, out of the public eye. She then works with a promoter to make lucrative appearances to take advantage of the scandal. Eventually, the public tires of her, and she is reduced to working in vaudeville.

At Keith's secret insistence, Stephen Norman offers her the starring role in his play, which had closed after its one performance. She is reluctant to return to London but cannot refuse the money. Public reaction is at first hostile, but Keith diligently writes articles to sway public opinion. On opening night, Stella refuses to take the stage, dreading her reception, but Keith appears backstage and draws her attention to Gloria and Nana, who are seated in the audience.

== Cast ==
- Kay Francis as Stella Parish
- Ian Hunter as Keith Lockridge
- Paul Lukas as Stephan Norman
- Sybil Jason as Gloria Parish
- Jessie Ralph as Nana
- Barton MacLane as Clifton Jeffords, Stella's husband
- Eddie Acuff as Dimmy
- Joe Sawyer as Chuck
- Walter Kingsford as Reeves, Keith's editor
- Harry Beresford as James
- Crauford Kent as Lord Chamberlain
- Olaf Hytten as Robert - Stephan's Butler
- Elsa Buchanan as Stella's Maid

== Reception ==
In a contemporary review for The New York Times, critic Frank Nugent wrote: "Mervyn LeRoy has directed it in the cadence of a graveyard processional. ... All told, here is a sorry tale and one that has but few redeeming qualities. Among these may be mentioned Ian Hunter's portrayal of the reporter and Sybil Jason's (with some reservations) performance as the child. Miss Francis's unfortunate lisp continues to plague this corner: it makes even more unbelievable the notion that London could regard her Stella Parish as the Duse of the day."

== Bibliography ==
- Kear, Lynn & Rossman John. Kay Francis: A Passionate Life and Career. McFarland, 2015.
