= Champagne for Caesar =

1950 film by Richard Whorf

- Film poster
- Directed by: Richard Whorf
- Written by: Hans Jacoby; Fred Brady
- Produced by: George Moskov
- Starring: Ronald Colman; Celeste Holm; Vincent Price; Art Linkletter; Barbara Britton
- Cinematography: Paul Ivano
- Edited by: Hugh Bennett
- Music by: Dimitri Tiomkin
- Production company: Cardinal Pictures
- Distributed by: United Artists
- Release dates: April 26, 1950 (Los Angeles); May 11, 1950 (New York)
- Running time: 99 minutes
- Country: United States
- Language: English

Champagne for Caesar is a 1950 American comedy film directed by Richard Whorf from an original screenplay by Hans Jacoby and Fred Brady. It stars Ronald Colman, Celeste Holm, Vincent Price, Barbara Britton and Art Linkletter. The film was produced by Harry M. Popkin for his Cardinal Pictures studio and released by United Artists.

== Plot ==
Beauregard Bottomley is a polymath who lives in Hollywood with his piano-instructor sister Gwenn. He is knowledgeable about every subject but cannot hold a job.

By accident, Beauregard and Gwenn see a television quiz show, Masquerade for Money, which is hosted by Happy Hogan and sponsored by Milady soap. Each contestant comes dressed in a costume, which determines the type of questions asked, and the prize money doubles with each correct answer, from $5 up to $160. A contestant can quit at any time, but an incorrect response results in the loss of all money previously won. Beauregard is contemptuous of the show.

A representative of the employment bureau encourages Beauregard to interview for a job with the Milady company. Beauregard meets the company's eccentric owner, Burnbridge Waters, who disapproves of Beauregard's humor and intellect and rejects him. To exact revenge, Beauregard becomes a contestant on Masquerade for Money, dressing as an encyclopedia so that the host can ask him questions about any subject. Beauregard easily answers his questions, earning $320, but he declines the prize and suggests that he return the next week.

Waters invites Beauregard back for one question per show for six weeks as a publicity stunt. Masquerade for Money tops the ratings, and sales of Milady soap skyrocket. At the end of the run, Waters approves giving Beauregard an impossibly hard question, but Beauregard answers it correctly. To calm Waters, Happy offers to take piano lessons from Gwenn and search for Beauregard's weakness. Beauregard immediately sees through the scheme, but Gwenn tells Happy that she knows that he is just trying to extract information from her, which he admits, but he also says that he is glad to have met her. Gwenn tells Happy that Beauregard intends to win $40 million. Happy informs Waters, who cancels the show and sends Beauregard a check for his current winnings of $40,000, which Beauregard refuses to accept.

Sales for Milady soap plummet, forcing Waters to reinstate the show. When Beauregard reaches $10 million, Waters recruits blonde temptress Flame O'Neill to distract him. After Beauregard catches a cold, Flame pretends to be a nurse sent to care for him. He is soon smitten with Flame and takes the bait when she tries to make him think that she is cheating on him.

The night of the next show, Beauregard discloses to Flame that he never mastered Albert Einstein's spacetime theory. When the $20 million question concerns that topic, Beauregard realizes that Flame has betrayed him and provides an answer that Happy says is incorrect. However, Einstein telephones the television studio to affirm that the answer was indeed correct, and Happy announces the update on air. Beauregard later confronts Flame, who has fallen for him. Unaware of this, he claims that he has deliberately misled her, as he had previously worked with Einstein and was familiar with spacetime, but he also admits that he has fallen in love with her.

Waters books the Hollywood Bowl for the final show. Happy and Gwenn plan to marry, as do Beauregard and Flame, but Beauregard and Gwenn caution each other that their prospective spouses could be just pursuing the money. Both men phone their fiancées, but Happy and Flame both provide excuses.

For the final question, Happy asks Beauregard to name his Social Security number. Beauregard answers incorrectly, but Flame and Happy still want to marry the Bottomley siblings. Waters visits Beauregard's home bearing gifts, including champagne, and is recognized by Beauregard and Gwenn's dipsomaniac pet parrot Caesar, whom he had lost in college. As Beauregard and Flame drive to Las Vegas to get married, Beauregard reveals that he and Waters made a deal: Beauregard would lose in exchange for his own radio show and some stock, among other considerations, although his main reason to accept the deal was to test Flame's feelings for him. Beauregard admits that he really did not know his Social Security number.

== Cast ==
- Ronald Colman as Beauregard Bottomley
- Celeste Holm as Flame O'Neill
- Vincent Price as Burnbridge Waters
- Barbara Britton as Gwenn Bottomley
- Art Linkletter as Happy Hogan
- Gabriel Heatter as himself, a radio journalist
- George Fisher as himself, a radio journalist
- Byron Foulger as Gerald
- Ellye Marshall as Frosty
- Vici Raaf as Waters' secretary
- Douglas Evans as the announcer for Masquerade for Money
- John Eldredge as Milady Executive No. 1
- Lyle Talbot as Milady Executive No. 2
- George Leigh as Milady Executive No. 3
- John Hart as Milady Executive No. 4
- Mel Blanc as the voice of Caesar, a parrot
- Peter Brocco as Rajah Raz
- Brian O'Hara as Buck, an IRS agent
- Jack Daly as Scratch, an IRS agent
- Gordon Nelson as the host of Adventures in Science
- Herbert Lytton as Chuck Johnson
- George Meader as Mr. Brown

== Reception ==
In a contemporary review for The New York Times, critic Bosley Crowther wrote: "This corner gratefully remembers an old New Yorker cartoon in which a triumphant quiz-show contestant, surrounded by loot which she had won, was ruefully being announced the winner of control of the sponsor's company. It was a very funny cartoon—a very shrewd and fantastic conceit—in which the monstrous extravagance of quiz shows was swiftly and neatly ridiculed. And apparently Hans Jacoby and Fred Brady remembered it, too, for their screen play for 'Champagne for Caesar' is a mere elaboration of this idea. ... We'll take The New Yorker's cartoon."

Critic Edwin Schallert of the Los Angeles Times called Champagne for Caesar "thoroughly entertaining" and wrote: "Scenes are amusing because most people know quiz programs, and will find this a somewhat fabulous adventure in that province. Colman performs with that suavity and distinction which have been his perennial attributes in comedy parts. It is good to see him back in this milieu."

Life magazine wrote: "Other movie moguls may keep dignified silence when their customers stay home to wait for a phone call offering a chance at a quiz show prize. Not so independent producer Harry M. Popkin, who believes in carrying the war into the enemy's country. This he has done in a lively comedy called (for no good reason) Champagne for Caesar, which swings a number of wild satirical blows at the mentality of the radio and television industries in general."

Some contemporary reviews criticized the final plot twist for having negated Beauregard's earlier criticism of quiz shows when he is awarded his own. Schallert's review mentioned that "[t]he finish leaves the slight impression that Colman in his role has engaged in double dealing, notwithstanding explanations" and Life's review concluded: "[T]he movie's idea of a happy ending is to have the hero ally himself with the forces of intellectual destruction and start a radio program of his own."
