= Alan Marshal (actor) =

Australian actor

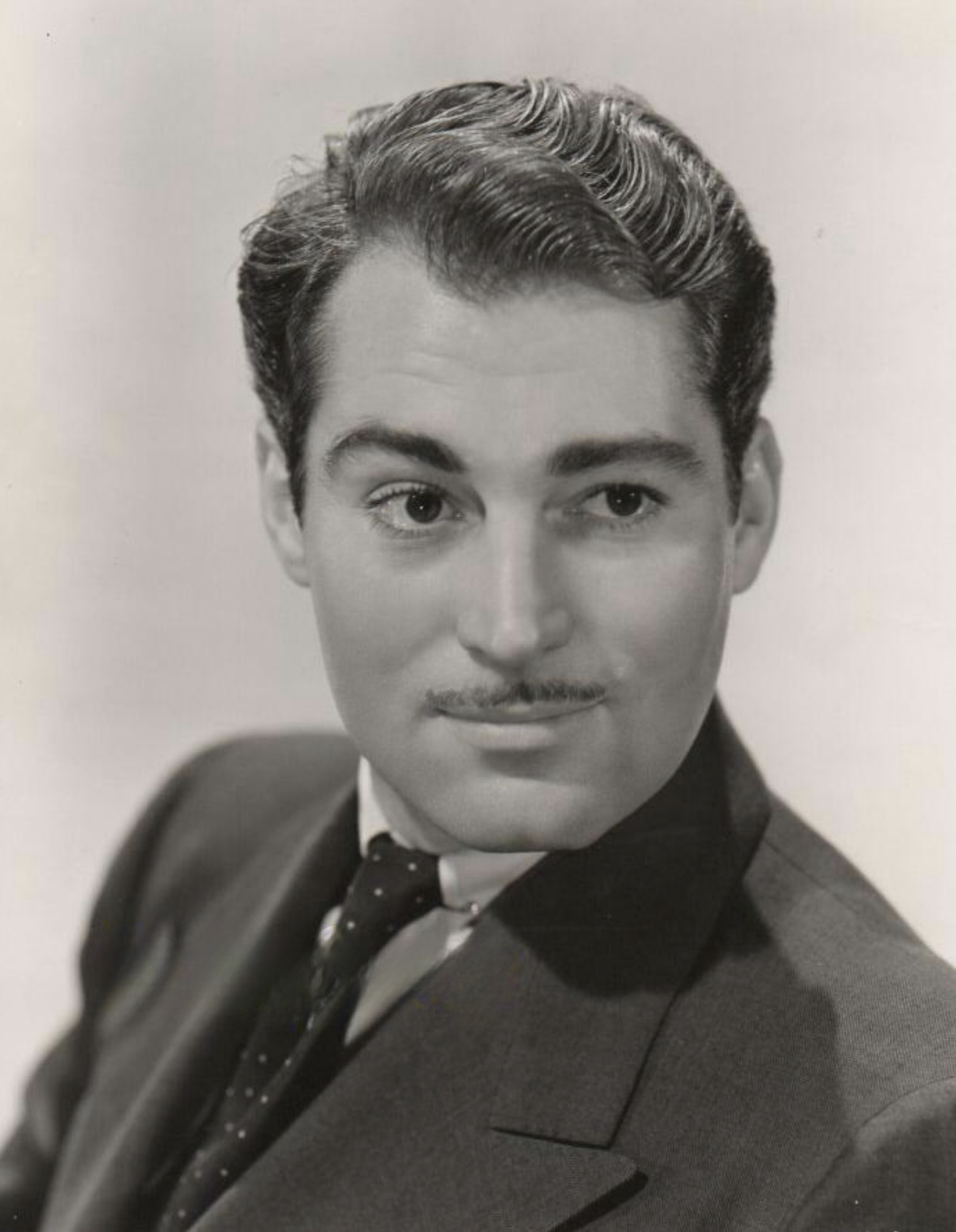
- Marshal in 1938
- Born: Alan Marshal Willey; 29 January 1909; Woollahra, Sydney, New South Wales, Australia
- Died: 9 July 1961 (aged 52); Chicago, Illinois, U.S.
- Resting place: Forest Lawn Memorial Park
- Occupation: Actor
- Years active: 1923–1961
- Spouse: Mary Grace Borel (m. 1938; div. 1948)
- Children: 1

Alan Marshal (born Alan Marshal Willey; 29 January 1909 – 9 July 1961) was an Australian-born actor who performed on stage in the United States and in Hollywood films. He was sometimes billed as Alan Marshall or Alan Willey.

== Biography ==
=== Early life ===
Born Alan Marshal Willey in Sydney, Australia, he was the son of popular Queensland stage actress Irby (Agnes) Marshal and English actor-producer Leonard Willey. The family left Australia in mid-1914, when he was five years old.

Willey and Marshal appeared in several Australian films made in 1912 – including The Strangler's Grip (1912) and The Mystery of the Black Pearl (1912), both directed by Franklyn Barrett.

Irby and Leonard continued their successful careers on the stage in the United States, first in San Francisco then in New York.

=== Early acting career ===
Alan reportedly first appeared on Broadway in The Swan (1923), at age 15 as "Alan Willey".

He went on to appear on Broadway as Stephano in The Merchant of Venice (1928), a production that also featured his father Leonard Willey as Antonio. Other Broadway stage productions he performed in include The Game of Love and Death (1929–30), Michael and Mary (1930), and Death Takes a Holiday (1931).

As "Alan Marshal", he had roles on Broadway in Foolscap (1933), Going Gay (1934), While Parents Sleep (1934), Lady Jane (1934), The Bishop Misbehaves (1935) and On Stage (1935).

=== Film career ===
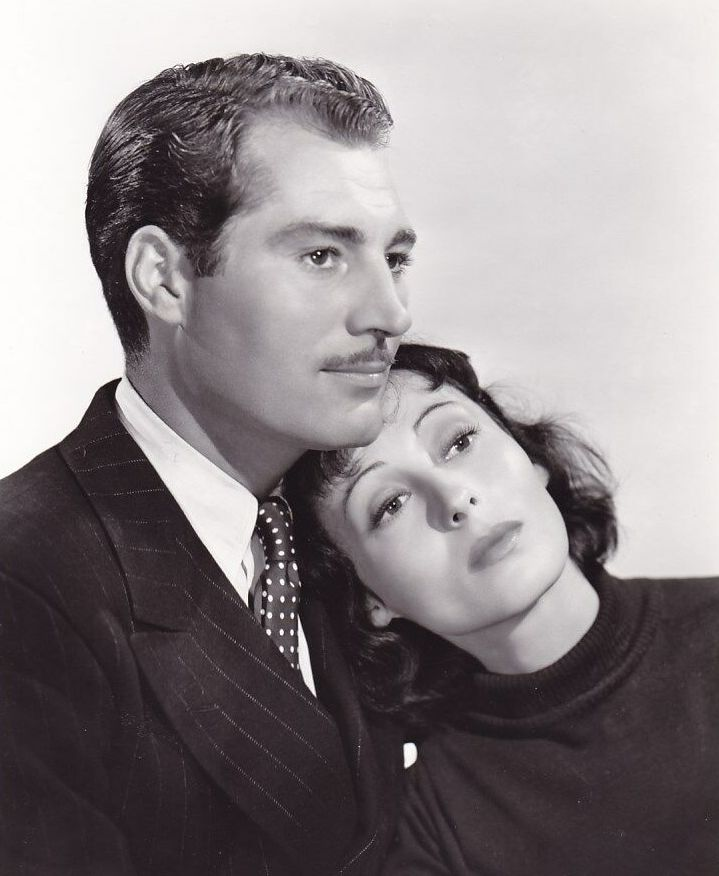
Publicity photo of Marshal and Luise Rainer in Dramatic School (1938)

According to his son, Kit, Marshal was spotted by a studio scout while performing in a play in New York and was asked to do a screen test for Selznick International Studios.

Selznick cast him in a supporting role in The Garden of Allah (1936) with Charles Boyer and Marlene Dietrich.

Marshal was loaned to MGM where he was in After the Thin Man (1936). That studio liked him and gave him a good part in Night Must Fall (1937).

Marshal was used by MGM for key roles in prestige pictures: Parnell (1937), playing William O'Shea who was cuckolded by Clark Gable and Myrna Loy; and Conquest (1937) with Greta Garbo and Boyer, playing Philippe Antoine d'Ornano. Walter Wanger borrowed him for I Met My Love Again (1938), billed fourth.

Marshal's first lead role was in a B picture at Republic Films, Invisible Enemy (1938). He went back to support parts for The Road to Reno (1938) at Universal, then was the romantic male lead in Dramatic School (1938) with Luise Rainer at MGM, a big flop. He played a similar sort of part in Four Girls in White (1939) then was Anna Sten's co star in Exile Express (1939) made at Grand National Pictures.

Marshal had a strong role in 20th Century Fox's The Adventures of Sherlock Holmes (1939) supporting Basil Rathbone and Ida Lupino.

At RKO, Marshal had a supporting part in The Hunchback of Notre Dame (1939) and the lead in a B picture, Married and in Love (1940), directed by John Farrow. He supported Anna Neagle in Irene (1940) at RKO and Loretta Young in He Stayed for Breakfast (1940) at Columbia.

Marshal stayed at Columbia for The Howards of Virginia (1940) with Cary Grant then went back to RKO to play one of Ginger Rogers's suitors in Tom, Dick and Harry (1940), a big hit. He was second billed to Merle Oberon in Lydia (1941). In 1942 Selznick sold many of his contracts to 20th Century Fox including Marshal's.

Marshal was second billed to Irene Dunne in The White Cliffs of Dover (1944) at MGM, a huge hit. He was top billed in Bride by Mistake (1944) with Laraine Day, another box office success. "It's the third time I've been discovered", said Marshall, who was set to star in Claudia (1945).

Marshal had a nervous breakdown and did not act for a number of years.

=== Television ===
Marshall was announced for Three Came Home (1950) but did not appear in the final film. It was reported he withdrew due to illness.

Marshal concentrated on television in the 1950s, appearing in episodes of Lights Out (1950) ("The Dark Corner"), The Clock (1951) ("Last Adventure"), Robert Montgomery Presents (1952) ("Claire Ambler"), and Climax! (1956) ("The Hanging Judge", directed by John Frankenheimer).

Marshal returned to movies with a small role in The Opposite Sex (1956). He was more commonly found on TV, such as in Playhouse 90 (1957, "The Greer Case"), Perry Mason (1958, "The Case of the Terrified Typist"), Buckskin (1958, "The Ghost of Balaclava"), General Electric Theatre (1958, "Battle for a Soul", directed by Ray Milland), Wagon Train (1958, "The Doctor Willoughby Story", with Jane Wyman), The Ann Sothern Show (1958, "The Countess of Bartley"), Alfred Hitchcock Presents (1958, "Murder Me Twice"), Rawhide (1959, "Incident on the Edge of Madness", with Lon Chaney Jr), 77 Sunset Strip (1959)("In Memoriam"), M Squad (1959) ("Ghost Town"), Sugarfoot (1959, "The Vultures"), Bourbon Street Beat (1959, "Invitation to a Murder") and Surfside 6 (1960, "Spinout at Sebrin").

Marshal had a supporting role in House on Haunted Hill (1959) starring Vincent Price and directed by William Castle, and the western Day of the Outlaw (1959).

== Filmography ==
Year	Title	Role	Notes
1936	The Garden of Allah	Captain De Trevignac	
1936	After the Thin Man	Robert Landis	
1937	Night Must Fall	Justin	
1937	Parnell	Willie	
1937	Conquest	Captain d'Ornano	
1938	I Met My Love Again	Michael Shaw	
1938	Invisible Enemy	Jeffrey Clavering	
1938	The Road to Reno	Walter Crawford	
1938	Dramatic School	Marquis Andre D'Abbencourt	
1939	Four Girls in White	Dr. Stephen Melford	
1939	Exile Express	Steve Reynolds	
1939	The Adventures of Sherlock Holmes	Jerrold Hunter	
1939	The Hunchback of Notre Dame	Captain Phoebus	
1940	Married and in Love	Dr. Leslie Yates	
1940	Irene	Bob Vincent	
1940	He Stayed for Breakfast	Andre Dorlay	
1940	The Howards of Virginia	Roger Peyton	
1941	Tom, Dick and Harry	Dick	
1941	Lydia	Richard Mason	
1944	The White Cliffs of Dover	Sir John Ashwood	
1944	Bride by Mistake	Captain Anthony Travis	
1956	The Opposite Sex	Ted	
1958	Alfred Hitchcock Presents	William Pryor	Season 4 Episode 9: "Murder Me Twice"
1959	House on Haunted Hill	Dr. David Trent	
1959	Day of the Outlaw	Hal Crane	(final film)

== Family ==
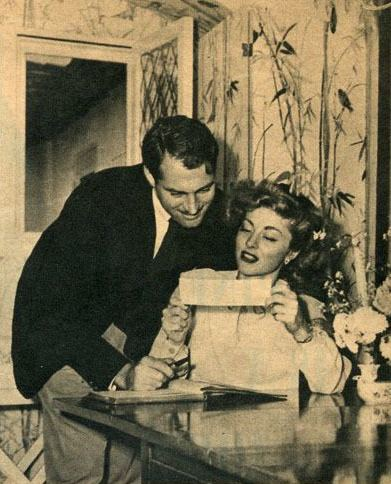
Alan and Mary Marshal at home, 1940s

Marshal eloped with socialite Mary Grace Borel in November 1938. The couple had one son, Christopher ("Kit"), who also became an actor. Borel sued for divorce in August 1947. Marshal did not remarry.

== Death ==
Marshal died after suffering a heart attack while appearing in Chicago with Mae West in a production of her play Sextette at the Edgewater Beach Playhouse on 9 July 1961. He was 52 years old. He finished the performance but was later found dead in his bed at the Edgewater Beach Hotel. His son Kit was also performing in the same show.

His interment was at Forest Lawn Memorial Park Cemetery in Glendale, California.
