= Second Chance (1950 film) =

1950 English war drama romance film directed by William Beaudine

- Directed by: William Beaudine
- Written by: Robert Presnell Sr.
- Produced by: Paul F. Heard
- Starring: Ruth Warrick; John Hubbard; Hugh Beaumont
- Cinematography: Marcel Le Picard
- Edited by: Albrecht Joseph
- Music by: Louis Forbes
- Distributed by: Protestant Film Commission
- Release date: 6 September 1950
- Running time: 72 minutes
- Country: United States
- Language: English

Second Chance is a 1950 American black-and-white drama film directed by William Beaudine and produced by Paul F. Heard for the Protestant Film Commission. It stars Ruth Warrick, John Hubbard, and Hugh Beaumont. The story centers on a middle-aged woman who has received a dire health prognosis from her doctor and proceeds to look back on her life in flashback, seeing herself change from a sweet and idealistic young bride into a brittle and disillusioned older woman. In the end, the wake-up call is really a dream, but the woman realizes that only by reconnecting with her Christian faith and with God will she manage to improve her life and relationships. The film was not released commercially, but was widely distributed to Protestant denominational churches in the United States and Canada.

== Plot ==
Emily Dean, a middle-aged woman, returns from a doctor's visit with a dire prognosis that she does not have much time left to live. As her husband Ed is on a business trip in St. Louis, she walks herself home and sits down on a park bench to review her life in flashback. Her memories begin with her first days as a married couple. Their pastor visits them and encourages Emily and Ed to keep God in their relationship, as well as to share their faith with others through the fellowship of the church. They agree to join church committees and reach out to those who have strayed from their faith. They become so busy with church work that they don't have time to take on other commitments. As time passes, however, their attention turns to the pressures of making a living, cultivating relationships with Ed's bosses and their wives to help him advance at the bank, child-raising and housekeeping. They begin finding themselves in the opposite position, unwilling to find time to help with church affairs and becoming estranged from one another.

Their lives are further stressed by the death of their older son Dickie, who is drafted in World War II, and the decision of their younger son Jimmy to leave home and marry without their knowledge or permission. When Jimmy brings home his bride to meet them, Emily gives the girl the cold shoulder. Later a newly-married couple come to visit Emily and Ed in their home to encourage them to become active once again in the church's couples committee, and both of them realize how far they have strayed from their ideals, and how much they have lost.

The next morning, Emily awakens to find Ed in the bed beside hers, even though he is supposed to be in St. Louis. He tells her that he is leaving that night, and Emily realizes that she has dreamed the whole visit to the doctor and her subsequent crisis of conscience. Later that day, when the doctor gives her a clean bill of health and Ed calls to invite her to join him on the trip to St. Louis, Emily changes her tone and happily agrees to join him, asking only that they be back by Sunday morning, when she plans to attend church once again.

== Cast ==
- Ruth Warrick as Emily Dean
- John Hubbard as Edward Elwood Dean
- Hugh Beaumont as Pastor Dr. Emory
- David Holt as Jimmy Dean
- Pat Combs as Dick Dean
- Ellye Marshall as Irene
- John Holland as Dr. Matthews
- Joan Carroll as Nurse Eva
- John Marston as Harry Decker
- Jameson Shade as Mr. Lewis
- Fay Kern as Mrs. Lewis

== Production ==
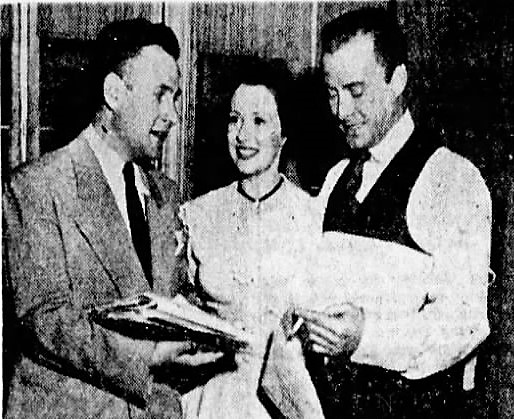
(L. to r.) Producer Paul F. Heard and stars Ruth Warrick and John Hubbard discuss the script for Second Chance

=== Development ===
Unlike other short films produced by the Protestant Film Commission, Second Chance is a full-length feature film with a running time of 72 minutes. (Note: Also listed as 80 minutes in the 1985 Feature Films directory.) The screenplay, by Russell Presnall, was adapted from the short story Second Chance by Faith Baldwin, published in the August 1948 issue of Woman's Day.

=== Casting ===
Though only 36 years old, Ruth Warrick "defied all Hollywood conventional behavior" by agreeing to have her face and hair aged by makeup to play Emily as a middle-aged woman. According to syndicated Hollywood columnist Jimmie Fidler, Warrick was one of a number of Hollywood actors who believed in contributing their talents to films promoting spiritual values in addition to traditional Hollywood entertainment fare. Warrick planned to make a number of personal appearances in churches on the West Coast to promote the film after its release.

Hugh Beaumont, who plays the pastor, was in real life a lay minister in the Methodist church.

=== Filming ===
Second Chance was the second of eleven films directed by William Beaudine for the Protestant Film Commission. Beaudine typically shot each film in less than a week. Production began on December 17, 1949, at Nassour Studios in Los Angeles.

== Release ==
The 16 mm film was released in 1950. It was only made available to churches in the Congregational and Reformed denominations during the 1950 calendar year, as those denominations had helped sponsor the production.

== Critical reception ==
Warrick received widespread praise for her performance. Author John Cocchi claims her performance "steals the show" as she grows from a sweet young bride into a disillusioned older woman.

== Home media ==
The film was released on DVD in 2008 by Alpha Video Distributors.

== Sources ==
- The American Film Institute Catalog of Motion Pictures: Film Beginnings. Vol. 2. R. R. Bowker. 1941. ISBN 9780520215214.
- Cocchi, John (1991). Second Feature: The Best of the B's. Carol Publishing Group. ISBN 9780806511863.
- Feature Films: A Directory of Feature Films on 16mm and Videotape Available for Rental, Sale, and Lease. R. R. Bowker. 1985. ISBN 9780835219297.
- Goble, Alan, ed. (2011). The Complete Index to Literary Sources in Film. Walter de Gruyter. ISBN 9783110951943.
- Lindvall, Terry; Quicke, Andrew (2011). Celluloid Sermons: The Emergence of the Christian Film Industry, 1930-1986. NYU Press. ISBN 9780814753248.
- Marshall, Wendy L. (2005). William Beaudine: From Silents to Television. Scarecrow Press. ISBN 9780810852181.
