= Hong Kong Affair =

1958 American film

- Directed by: Paul F. Heard
- Written by: Raymond Friedgen; Paul F. Heard; Herbert G. Luft; Helene Turner
- Produced by: Raymond Friedgen; Paul F. Heard
- Starring: Jack Kelly; May Wynn; Richard Loo
- Cinematography: S.T. Chow
- Edited by: Helene Turner
- Music by: Louis Forbes
- Production company: Claremont Pictures
- Distributed by: Allied Artists
- Release date: May 11, 1958
- Running time: 79 minutes
- Country: United States
- Language: English

Hong Kong Affair is a 1958 American noir crime film directed by Paul F. Heard and starring Jack Kelly, May Wynn and Richard Loo. It was distributed by Allied Artists. Kelly was at the time starring with James Garner in the hit Western television show Maverick and the film's advertising emphasized this. The picture was shot on location in Hong Kong.

== Plot ==
Following service in the Korean War, American Steve Whalen visits Hong Kong to look in on a tea plantation in which he has inherited a half share. When told that the business is very unprofitable by his local partner, Whalen becomes suspicious and a series of attacks on him lead him to investigate. The plantation is being used as a front for opium smuggling.

== Cast ==
- Jack Kelly as Steve Whalen
- May Wynn as Chu Lan
- Richard Loo as Li Noon
- Gerald Young as Louis Jordan
- Michael Bulmer as Inspector Stuart
- James Hudson as Jim Long
- Lolita Shek as Sou May

== Bibliography ==
- Langman, Larry & Finn, Daniel. A Guide to American Crime Films of the Forties and Fifties. Greenwood Press, 1995.
- Lindvall, Terry & Quicke, Andrew. Celluloid Sermons: The Emergence of the Christian Film Industry, 1930-1986. NYU Press, 2011.
