= May Wynn =

American dancer, actress (1928–2021)

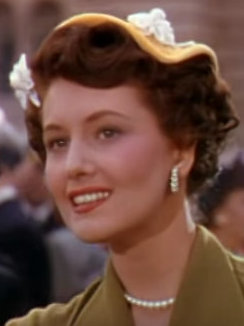
- Wynn in The Caine Mutiny (1954)
- Born: Donna Lee Hickey; January 8, 1928; New York City, U.S.
- Died: March 22, 2021 (aged 93); Newport Beach, California, U.S.
- Occupations: Actress, realtor, teacher's aide
- Years active: 1945–1960
- Spouses: Jack Kelly (m. 1956; div. 1964) Jack W. Custer (m. 1968; div. 1979)

Donna Lee Custer (née Hickey, January 8, 1928 – March 22, 2021), better known by the stage name May Wynn, was an American dancer, singer, actress turned realtor, and teacher's aide after her performance career.

== Early life ==
Wynn was born January 8, 1928, in New York City. She grew up in Forest Hills, Queens, and was descended from a line of performers: Her grandfather, Bertie Black, worked as a musician in vaudeville, and her father, Ray Hickey, was a song-and-dance performer in vaudeville. She was of Irish descent. Her early jobs included modeling, working in a department store, and being a page at La Guardia Field. Outside of work, she won a variety of talent contests.

== Career ==
In 1945, the 17-year-old Wynn began performing as a dancer, under her birth name, at New York's Copacabana nightclub. She was tested for a key supporting role in From Here to Eternity (1953), but Donna Reed played the part. Her film career started in 1951, with six uncredited background parts before her first credited role, under her birth name, in 1953's The Farmer Takes a Wife. That same year, she was cast to play a character named May Wynn in The Caine Mutiny; before the film was released in 1954, its producer, Stanley Kramer, advised her to change her name to that of her character, which she used from that film onwards. Wynn later was cast as the lead actress in the feature films The Man Is Armed and The White Squaw (both 1956), and in Jack Webb's NBC television series, Noah's Ark, in which she played opposite Paul Burke and Victor Rodman. In 1958, she starred with her then-husband Jack Kelly in Hong Kong Affair. Her last appearance was a minor role in a 1960 episode of the television series Shotgun Slade.

Wynn worked in real estate after leaving acting, and in 1989, she began work as a part-time aide with Our Lady Queen of Angels Catholic School in Newport Beach, California. In January 2018, Wynn, then known as Donna Custer, was feted by the school on her 90th birthday, thanking her for her years of using "her experience to help students … build confidence during her after-school public-speaking classes."

== Personal life ==
Wynn married actor Jack Kelly in October 1956. The couple divorced in 1964. She was married to Jack W. Custer from 1968 to 1979, when they were divorced.

Wynn died in Newport Beach, California, in March 2021 at the age of 93.

== Selected filmography ==
- The Caine Mutiny (1954)
- They Rode West (1954)
- The Violent Men (1955)
- The White Squaw (1956)
- Hong Kong Affair (1958)
