= Dramatic School (film) =

1938 film directed by Robert B. Sinclair

- Theatrical release poster
- Directed by: Robert B. Sinclair
- Written by: Ernest Vajda; Mary C. McCall Jr.
- Based on: School of Drama; Hungarian play by János Székely; Zoltan Egyed
- Produced by: Mervyn LeRoy
- Starring: Luise Rainer; Paulette Goddard; Alan Marshal
- Cinematography: William H. Daniels
- Edited by: Fredrick Y. Smith
- Music by: Franz Waxman
- Production company: Metro-Goldwyn-Mayer
- Distributed by: Loew's Inc.
- Release date: December 9, 1938
- Running time: 80 minutes
- Country: United States
- Language: English
- Budget: $602,000
- Box office: $664,000

Dramatic School is a 1938 American romantic drama film directed by Robert B. Sinclair and starring Luise Rainer, Paulette Goddard, Alan Marshal, Lana Turner, and Gale Sondergaard. Based on the play School of Drama by Hans Székely and Zoltan Egyed, the screenplay was written by Ernest Vajda and Mary C. McCall. The film was produced and distributed by Metro-Goldwyn-Mayer.

== Plot ==
Modest, kind-hearted aspiring actress Louise Mauban (Luise Rainer) attends the Paris School of Drama while working nights at a dreary factory job, where she has made friends with another worker. She often comes to class late but rather than admit she has to work nights, she tells her fellow students stories of a luxurious life and her wealthy, handsome boyfriend, Marquis Andre D'Abbencourt (Alan Marshal). The other girls begin to suspect that her stories are just fantasies that she weaves to relieve her humdrum life. One of them, Nana (Paulette Goddard), maliciously invites Louise to her "birthday party", having arranged for Andre to attend. However, the plan backfires. Andre is enchanted by Louise and the lie turns into the truth. He showers her with gifts and takes her out every night.

Andre eventually becomes enamored of another woman and breaks up with Louise by letter. When Louise's friends show up, she tells them to take their pick of the fabulous clothes Andre has given her. However, to a late-arriving Nana, she shows the letter, as her "gift". Nana's heart is softened to her rival and they become friends.

One of the teachers is impressed by Louise's sincerity and talent, but another teacher and aging star, Madame Therese Charlot (Gale Sondergaard), is jealous of Louise. Madame Therese is upset to learn from the school's director, Monsieur Pasquel, Sr. (Henry Stephenson) that she will not get the leading role in a new play about Joan of Arc because she is no longer young enough. In her bitterness, she lashes out when Louise is late to class once again; she informs Louise that she will demand her expulsion. Louise follows her and, to Charlot's surprise, thanks her. Louise explains that she believes that to be a great star, she must suffer, as Madame Charlot herself had suffered early in her own career.

The next day, Louise defiantly returns to class. Madame Charlot announces that she has accepted another, more mature role in the play and recommended Louise for the lead. Louise gets the part and is a great success on opening night, receiving a standing ovation. On the night of her triumph, she turns down party invitations, including one from Andre, to celebrate with her friend from the factory.

== Cast ==
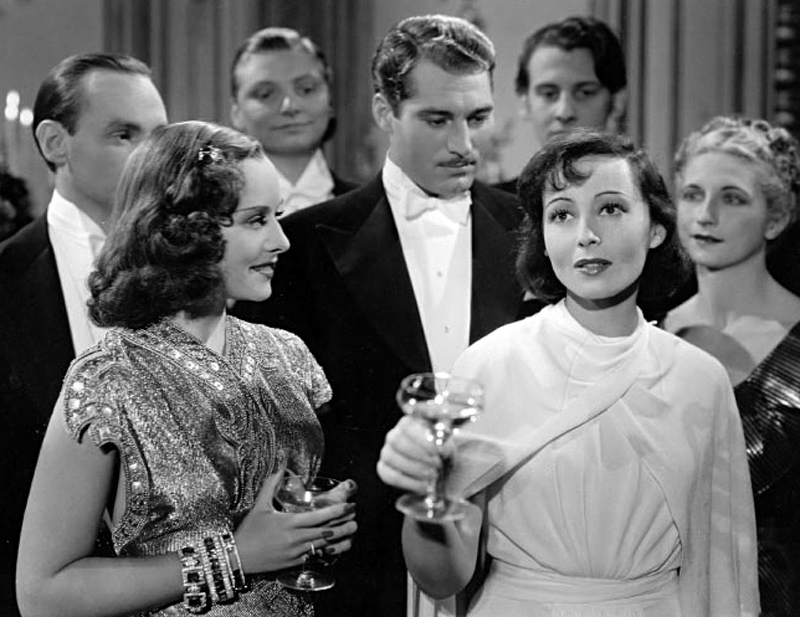
Paulette Goddard, Alan Marshal and Luise Rainer in Dramatic School

- Luise Rainer as Louise Mauban (Note: This was to be the debut film of Greer Garson under her MGM contract, but Garson injured her back, and Rainer was cast instead. Garson's first film for MGM was Goodbye, Mr. Chips (1939).)
- Paulette Goddard as Nana
- Alan Marshal as Marquis Andre D'Abbencourt
- Lana Turner as Mado
- Genevieve Tobin as Gina Bertier
- John Hubbard as Fleury (as Anthony Allan)
- Henry Stephenson as Pasquel, Sr.
- Gale Sondergaard as Madame Therese Charlot
- Melville Cooper as Boulin
- Erik Rhodes as Georges Mounier
- Virginia Grey as Simone
- Ann Rutherford as Yvonne
- Margaret Dumont as the Pantomime Teacher
- Hans Conried as Ramy
- Marie Blake as Annette
- Rand Brooks as Pasquel Jr.
- Arthur Gardner as Student (Uncredited)
- Ralph Faulkner as Fencing Teacher (Uncredited)

== Box office ==
According to MGM records the film earned $433,000 in the US and Canada and $231,000 elsewhere resulting in a loss of $206,000.
