= Invisible Enemy (film) =

1938 film by John H. Auer

- Theatrical release poster
- Directed by: John H. Auer
- Screenplay by: Norman Burnstine; Alex Gottlieb
- Story by: Albert J. Cohen; Robert T. Shannon
- Produced by: John H. Auer
- Starring: Alan Marshal; Tala Birell; Mady Correll; C. Henry Gordon; Herbert Mundin; Gerald Oliver Smith
- Cinematography: Jack A. Marta
- Edited by: William Morgan
- Music by: Alberto Colombo
- Production company: Republic Pictures
- Distributed by: Republic Pictures
- Release date: April 4, 1938
- Running time: 66 minutes
- Country: United States
- Language: English

Invisible Enemy is a 1938 American crime film directed by John H. Auer and written by Norman Burnstine and Alex Gottlieb. The film stars Alan Marshal, Tala Birell, Mady Correll, C. Henry Gordon, Herbert Mundin and Gerald Oliver Smith. The film was released on April 4, 1938, by Republic Pictures.

== Plot ==
The film takes place in London and Paris, where Jeffrey Clavering is sent to prevent vital oilfields falling into the hands of a villainous industrialist working for a hostile foreign power.

== Cast ==
- Alan Marshal as Jeffrey Clavering
- Tala Birell as Sandra Kamarov
- Mady Correll as Princess Stephanie
- C. Henry Gordon as Nikolai Kamarov
- Herbert Mundin as Sergeant Alfred M. Higgs
- Gerald Oliver Smith as Bassett
- Ivan Simpson as Michael
- Elsa Buchanan as Sophia
- Dwight Frye as Alex
- Leonard Willey as Sir Herbert Donbridge
- Ian Maclaren as Sir Joshua Longstreet
- Egon Brecher as Kirman
- Frank Puglia as Signor Bramucci

== Marketing ==
Republic pictures had originally planned a much wider distribution for the film then it ended up getting. Through complications in Republic Film's marketing department, the film ended playing as a B movie for a variety of other films through which it appeared as a double feature, though only in certain regions. According to John H. Auer Republic Pictures "overspent" in Southern California "all of the Southern states" before Herbert J. Yates decided it would have a more limited release. "As a result, the movie got top billing, or at least as close as we got to top billing, in the south and in parts of California, at least around Los Angeles and Bakersfield and so on, and in every Southern media market we had other than Texas. So, Georgia, the Carolinas, Alabama, Tennessee, Mississippi, Florida, it ran as a B movie all the time there, for a while, but we had already spent the money by the time he (Yates) pulled the plug. So instead of it getting a small release everywhere, it got a somewhat big release there and almost no release elsewhere. All of the money that we had left over that we were gonna spend pushing it in New York, Boston, Philadelphia and whatnot, all of that went to Jersey, so it was shown in basically every theater around New Jersey too, but like nowhere else in that region. Goes without saying we were all more cautious before spreading Forged Passport around." Continuing Auer added "So yeah, turned out a lot of folks in Alabama and Georgia and the Carolinas saw it, and some in New Jersey, but not a lot else. But we didn't care, it wasn't a big picture."
