= Bob Rogers (designer) =

American designer and film director

- Bob Rogers interacts with a ghostly Abraham Lincoln.
- Occupations: Themed entertainment designer, producer, and director
- Website: www.bobrogers.com

Bob Rogers is an American designer, producer, and director, most known for his work in themed entertainment. Rogers is founder and chairman of BRC Imagination Arts, a strategic design and production agency. Rogers oversees the creative elements of all BRC projects, serving clients like Coca-Cola, NASA, Disney, Johnnie Walker, Universal Studios, Ford, General Motors, China Mobile, China Telecom, and the Abraham Lincoln Presidential Library and Museum. He is a former member of the board of directors of the Academy of Motion Picture Arts and Sciences.

As a film and television director and producer, Rogers has earned two Academy Award nominations, for the live action short films Ballet Robotique and Rainbow War plus a Los Angeles Emmy Award nomination as the producer of the documentary short The Wedge: Dynasty, Tragedy, Legacy. Rogers has also worked on pavilions at world's fairs, including Expo 86 in Vancouver, Expo 88 in Brisbane, Expo '90 in Osaka, Expo '92 in Seville, Expo '93 in Taejon (now Daejeon), Expo 2005 in Aichi, Expo 2010 in Shanghai, and Expo 2015 in Milan and Expo 2017 in Astana, Kazakhstan.

== Career ==
Bob Rogers began his involvement in themed entertainment in 1968 with the Walt Disney Company, as a magician in the Magic Shop at the Disneyland theme park in California. Founded in 1981, Rogers' firm, BRC Imagination Arts has received over 400 international awards, including two Academy Award nominations and 23 Themed Entertainment Association (TEA) "THEA" Awards for "outstanding achievement in themed entertainment". In 2010, Rogers was inducted into the IAAPA Hall of Fame. In his induction by IAAPA, Rogers' company was referred to as "one of the world's leading creators of content-based visitor experiences for museums, cultural centers and theme parks".

In 1984, Rogers was elected into the Academy of Motion Picture Arts and Sciences, serving since as a voting member in the Oscar awards selection and rules process. In 2014 he was elected to serve on the board of governors (their board of directors) of the Academy of Motion Picture Arts and Sciences. Rogers is also a former board member of Ryman Arts, a non-profit which provides recognition and scholarships to young artists of exceptional talent.

The National Aeronautics and Space Administration (NASA) invited Rogers to help develop its master plan for the exploration of Mars as part of their Mars Exploration Program Analysis Group. In September 2002, Rogers was awarded the NASA Public Service Medal.

In 2009 Rogers received the "Order of Lincoln Medal" in recognition of his and BRC's work creating the Abraham Lincoln Presidential Library and Museum.

Rogers is a writer and popular speaker on the subject of content-based themed entertainment and is recognized among industry peers and the press as an expert in his field. Rogers has been quoted and interviewed in a wide range of media such as The New York Times, The Washington Post, Time, Fast Company, Popular Science, and the Los Angeles Times. He was a featured guest on National Public Radio's program, A Prairie Home Companion.

In 2007 Rogers received the Thea Award for Lifetime Achievement. Each year one such award is given to an individual who is recognized, industry-wide, for their key contributions to the evolution of themed design and entertainment. Past recipients have included film innovator Don Iwerks and Walt Disney Imagineers Marty Sklar, Tony Baxter and John Hench.

== Technical achievements ==
Rogers holds two patents in theater entertainment technologies. He is the inventor of the "Holavision" Theater; a special effect technique, which pairs live performances with "floating" aerial image illusions. Rogers' Holavision shows include Spirit Lodge at the Vancouver World's Fair, Mystery Lodge at Knott's Berry Farm, Animation Celebration at Universal Studios Japan, and Ghosts of the Library for the Abraham Lincoln Presidential Museum.

In 2012, Rogers and BRC revealed plans for "The Vomit Comet", a zero-G roller coaster capable of delivering eight full seconds of zero-gravity.

== Sources ==
- Thornburgh, Nathan (18 September 2006). "History Goes Hollywood". Time.
- Engel, Jane (10 March 2006). "History with Special Effects: Is it Museum or Haunted Mansion?". Los Angeles Times
- Decker, John D. (December 2005). "Exhibition Reviews: Abraham Lincoln Presidential Library and Museum". Journal of American History.
- Rothstein, Edward (19 April 2005). "Strumming the Mystic Chords of Memory". The New York Times.
- Wills, Christopher (17 April 2005). "With Smoke and Cannons, Museum Brings Lincoln to Life". Boston Globe.
- Clark, Jayne (15 April 2005). "Lincoln's Spirit Lives in New Museum". USA Today.
- Ewers, Justine / LaGesse, David. (21 February 2005). "The Real Lincoln – Special Report". U.S. News & World Report.
- Thompson, Bob (15 February 2005). "Histrionics and History". The Washington Post
- Holusha, John (19 January 2005). "Empire State Building to Update it's Tourist Experience". The New York Times.
- Schmelzer, Randi (6 December 2004). "Branding By Factory Tour? California's BRC Says You Betcha". Adweek.
- Diamond, Randy (20 November 2004). "Immersed in the Fun". Tampa Tribune.
- DeMarco, Donna (17 June 2004). "Fair Minded". Washington Times.
- Kerwin, Kathleen (3 May 2004). "When the Factory is a Theme Park". Business Week.
- Provenzano, Frank (11 April 2004). "Heart of Motor City: Public Tours of the Rouge Plant Show What Made Detroit Great". Detroit Free Press.
- Scheer, Mark (31 March 2004). "Bringing in a Little Imagination". Niagara Gazette.
- Chong, Madeline (5 November 2003). "Skyline Thrill for Sentosa Visitors". Today (Singapore).
- Rashiwala, Kalpana (5 November 2003). "$6M View from Sentosa Island Coming Soon". Singapore News.
- Zoroya, Gregg (1 February 2001). "Springfield Finally Getting Lincoln Library/Museum". USA Today.
- Kirsner, Scott (October 2000). "Experience Required". Fast Company.
- Reckard, E. Scott (22 August 2000). "Veteran Theme Park Designer Curious Over Disney's Adventure". Los Angeles Times.
- Kirsner, Scott (July 2000). "Are You Experienced?" Wired.
- O'Steen, Kathleen (1 March 2000). "Offering Amusement Wherever He Works". Los Angeles Times.
- McNay, Dave (1 November 1999). "Disney Spawns an Industry; Burbank Now Theme Park Production Hub". Daily News.
- Harvey, Steve (1 November 1999). "More Thoughts on Flex Time", Los Angeles Times.
- Hold, Douglas (1 November 1999). "Library to Unlock Lincoln Collections". Chicago Tribune.
- Fisher, Sara (1 May 1999). "Size Does Matter: Building of Large-Screen Theaters for Large-Format Films". Los Angeles Business Journal.
- John-Hall, Annette (1 March 1998). "Aquarium Hopes a Sea Change in its Fish Brightens Future". The Philadelphia Inquirer.
- Colimore, Edward (1 June 1997). "Aquarium Changes its Stripes to Technicolor: The Flashy Fish and Interactive Upgrades Debut This Weekend". The Philadelphia Inquirer.
- Colimore, Edward (1 June 1996). "Spots to Have a Maritime of Your Life". The Philadelphia Inquirer.
- Apodaca, Patrice (1 December 1995). "Burbank Firm Has Dream for King Center". Los Angeles Times.
- Gilling, Juliana (August 1995). "TiLE Tales". Los Angeles Business Journal.
- Klein, Julia M. (1 July 1995). "Fresh Fish: The Aquarium in Camden has been Enlivened by the New 'Ocean Base Atlantic'". The Philadelphia Inquirer.
- Sloan, Eugene (14 October 1992). "Launching A Space Museum with Theme Park Fun". USA Today.
- Carroll, Ginny (1 October 1992). "One Giant Leap for NASA". Newsweek.
- Epstein, Robert (1 April 1992). "Today, Burbank; Next, the World". Los Angeles Times
- Peltz, James F. (1 June 1991). "The Ace of Space". Los Angeles Times
- Lewis, Randy (24 March 1986). "Newport Native Nominated for Oscar". Los Angeles Times.
- Anderson, Bob (February 1983). "Impressions de France: Theatrical Style Circle-Vision". American Cinematographer.
- Robathan, Magali (Issue 1, 2021). "Interview: Bob Rogers - As BRC Imagination Arts celebrates its 40th anniversary, founder Bob Rogers shares the secrets of success with Magali Robathan." Attractions Management
- Chandler, Harry Brandt (1 May 2009). "Dreamers in Dream City - The Discoverers: George Ellery Hale; Ray Bradbury; Walt Disney; Bob Rogers; Aldous Huxley; Bob Mitchell; Amelia Earhart." Angel City Press
- O'Brien, Tim (November/December, 2007). "Engaging the Imagination - Bob Rogers and BRC Imagination Arts bring out the best in creative attractions." Fun World
- Niles, Robert (January, 2009). "An insider's visit with theme park designer Bob Rogers." Theme Park Insider
