= Ryman (disambiguation) =

Ryman is a British stationery retailer.

Ryman may also refer to:

- Rymań, a village in Poland
- Ryman Auditorium, an American performance venue
- Ryman Hospitality Properties, a diversified real estate investment trust whose holdings include the above venue
- Ryman Arts, an art school
- Isthmian League or Ryman League, an English football (soccer) league

== People ==
- Geoff Ryman (born 1951), Canadian writer of science fiction
- Herbert Ryman (1910–1989), American imagineer
- John Ryman (1930–2009), British former Labour Party Member of Parliament
- Robert Ryman (1930–2019), American minimalist artist
- Tommy Ryman (born 1983), stand-up comedian
- Will Ryman (born 1969), American artist, son of Robert Ryman
