= Martha Holliday =

American actress (1922–1970)

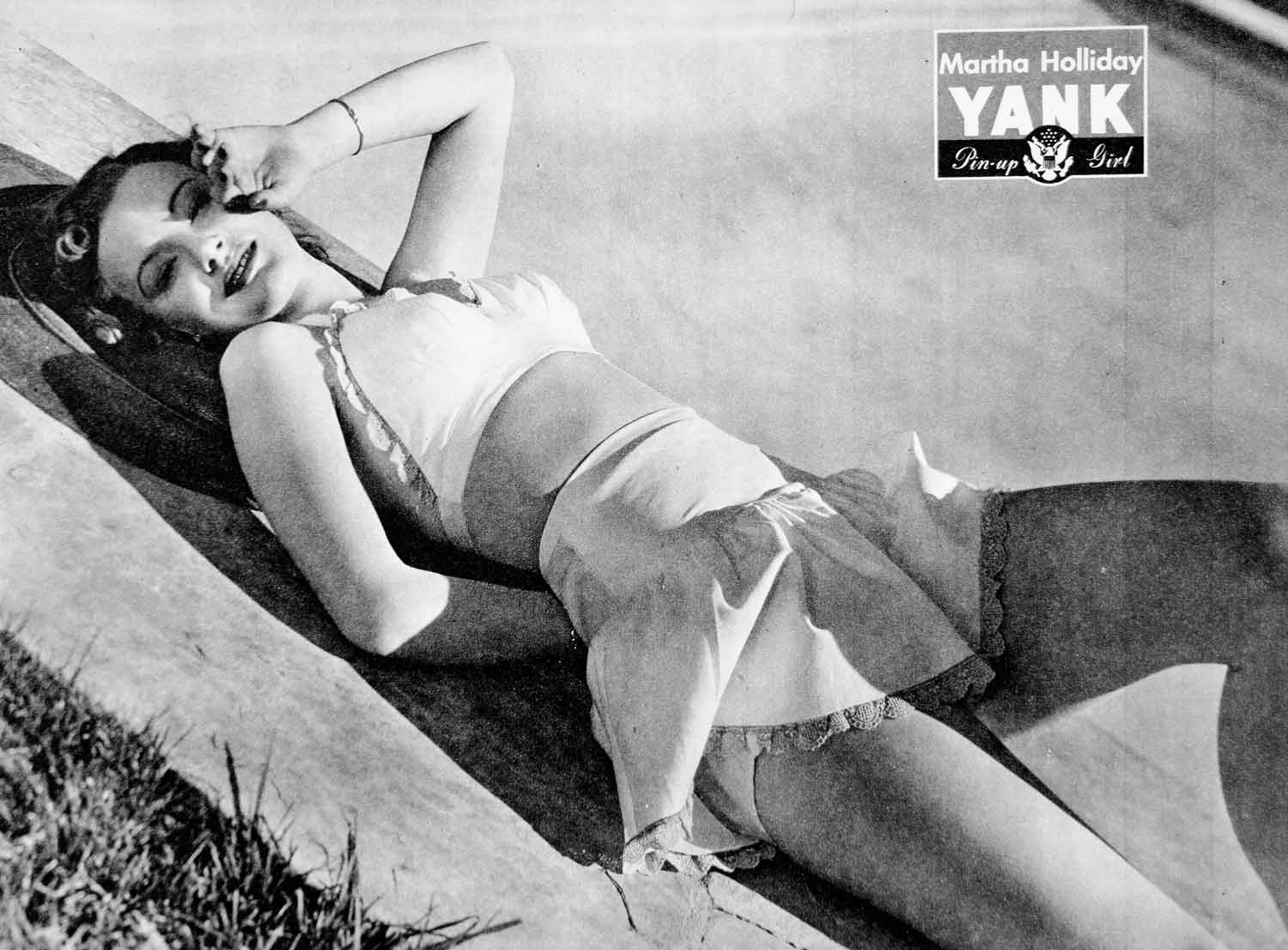
- Holliday in Yank, the Army Weekly magazine, 1945
- Born: Harriette Olson; August 3, 1922; Fort Smith, Arkansas, U.S.
- Died: November 22, 1970 (aged 48); Los Angeles, California, U.S.
- Resting place: Glen Haven Memorial Park, Sylmar, Los Angeles
- Occupation: Actress
- Years active: 1940–1948

Martha Holliday (born Harriette Olson August 3, 1922 – November 22, 1970) was an American actress and dancer. She was a prima ballerina with the Pro-Arte Ballet Company in Havana, Cuba, and had a starring role as the romantic feminine lead in the film George White's Scandals (1945). She also appeared as a pin-up model in Yank, the Army Weekly.

== Early life ==
Holliday was born in 1922 in Fort Smith, Arkansas, but moved to Oklahoma City as a child. She became a dancer as a child and a professional ballet dancer while in high school. On the same day she graduated from high school, she received a contract as a prima ballerina with the Pro-Arte Ballet Company in Havana, Cuba. After a brief stay in Cuba, she moved to Hollywood, California. She got a job at age 18 with Warner Brothers Studios, hoping to act but instead being assigned as a dance instructor. For three years, she taught dance routines to Warner Brothers stars.

== Acting career ==
In 1942, Holliday choreographed Jimmy Cagney's dance routines in the musical film Yankee Doodle Dandy. She also served as a leg double of the film's female stars for complex dance routines. Her early film appearances were limited to dancing under her birth name.

In 1944, Holliday signed a contract with RKO Pictures. RKO changed her name to Martha Holliday. Hoping to establish herself as an actress, she studied acting under Lillian Albertson. Instead, she was again assigned to teach dance routines to others. Finally, she secured a starring role as the romantic feminine lead in the musical comedy George White's Scandals (1945). Producer George White predicted early stardom for Holliday, and a writer in The Des Moines Register noted "Verily, the slippers of Cinderella now are on Martha Holliday's erstwhile tiptoeing tootsies!" After the film was released, one reviewer wrote, "While Martha Holliday has nimble toes and a pretty face, her English accent is fairly unusual." It proved to be her only featured role.

Holliday appeared as a pin-up girl in Yank, the Army Weekly magazine in December 1945. As U.S. senator Joseph O'Mahoney read a passage from the publication on the Senate floor, (Note: He was reading it because there was something he wanted to put into the record.) the image of the reverse page (Holliday's pin-up photograph) was displayed to the members of the Senate and passed from hand to hand. Columnist Harold Heffernan wrote, "The languorously graceful pose of Martha Holliday lazily sunning herself beside a swimming pool created a near-panic in the United States Senate."

Holliday also had smaller, uncredited roles in The Enchanted Cottage (1945), as the hat check girl in The Flame (1947), as Trudy Marsh in I, Jane Doe (1948), and as Pearl in Lulu Belle (1948).

== Death ==
Holliday retired from acting in 1948. She died in 1970 at age 48 in Los Angeles. She is interred in Glen Haven Memorial Park in Sylmar, Los Angeles.

== Filmography ==
Year	Film	Role	Notes
1943	Thank Your Lucky Stars	Dancer	(uncredited)
1945	The Enchanted Cottage	Bit Role	(uncredited)
1945	George White's Scandals	Jill Martin	
1947	The Flame	Hat Check Girl	(uncredited)
1948	I, Jane Doe	Trudy Marsh	(uncredited)
1948	Lulu Belle	Pearl	(uncredited)

== See also ==
- Pin-ups of Yank, the Army Weekly
