= Bobbed Hair =

Bobbed Hair may refer to:

- Bobbed Hair (1922 film), a 1922 American romance film
- Bobbed Hair (1925 film), a 1925 silent comedy film
- Bobbed Hair (1967 film), a 1967 South Korean film
- The bob cut, a hair style
