= The Mad Marriage =

The Mad Marriage may refer to:

- The Mad Marriage (1921 film)
- The Mad Marriage (1925 film)
