= The Falcon Out West =

1944 film by William Clemens

- Theatrical release poster
- Directed by: William Clemens
- Written by: Billy Jones; Morton Grant
- Based on: Characters created by Michael Arlen
- Produced by: Maurice Geraghty
- Starring: Tom Conway; Barbara Hale; Joan Barclay
- Cinematography: Harry J. Wild
- Edited by: Gene Milford; Theron Warth
- Music by: Roy Webb
- Production company: RKO Pictures
- Distributed by: RKO Pictures
- Release date: March 17, 1944 (U.S.)
- Running time: 64 minutes
- Country: United States
- Language: English

The Falcon Out West (aka The Falcon in Texas) is a 1944 American mystery film directed by William Clemens and starring Tom Conway, Joan Barclay and Barbara Hale. The film was part of RKO's The Falcon series of detective films, this time, a murder set in Texas.

== Plot ==
When Mrs. Irwin (Joan Barclay), asks Tom Lawrence (Tom Conway), aka the Falcon, to prevent the marriage of her ex-husband, Tex Irwin (Lyle Talbot) to his fiancée, gold digger Vanessa Drake (Carole Gallagher), The Falcon becomes involved in murder. Rich cattle baron Irwin is murdered in a New York City nightclub, dying from the venom of a rattlesnake. When suspicion falls on various members of his family and business associates, The Falcon and the police, led by Police Inspector Timothy Donovan (Cliff Clark) and his assistant, Homicide Detective Bates (Edward Gargan) travel west following Vanessa, to the Irwin ranch in Texas to try and solve the mystery.

At the ranch, when Lawrence is out riding, someone takes a pot shot at him and when Tex's lawyer Steven Hayden (Donald Douglas) is killed in the same way that Tex died, a snake bite, there are many suspicious individuals to consider. Dusty, Tex's foreman was in the nightclub when Tex had died. Tex's partner, Dave Colby (Minor Watson) and his daughter Marion (Barbara Hale) and Vanessa, and Mrs. Irwin, who turns up at the ranch, are all suspect. An Indian scalp is hung on Lawrence's door as a Comanche death warning for him not to go on with the investigation.

An apparent attack on Vanessa complicates matters. With Mrs. Irwin and the Colbys trying to stop her marriage, the police focus on Colby as the main suspect, but the Falcon is not sure. When Lawrence finds an Indian medicine bag containing the deed to Tex's ranch and a poison ring in the shape of a snake, he knows how the murders were committed.

Confronting Vanessa, she tries to use a poison ring to stab Lawrence but Dusty intervenes, pulling a gun on the Falcon. Dusty had been Vanessa's love interest and now reveals himself as her accomplice in murder. Colby's ranch hands and the police surround the house forcing the two killers to surrender.

At the train station, Tom and Marion watch Donovan and Bates board their train when a beautiful woman steps from the train and asks for help.

== Cast ==
- Tom Conway as Tom Lawrence, aka the Falcon
- Carole Gallagher as Vanessa Drake
- Barbara Hale as Marion Colby
- Joan Barclay as Mrs. Irwin
- Cliff Clark as Police Inspector Timothy Donovan
- Edward Gargan as Homicide Detective Bates
- Minor Watson as Dave Colby
- Donald Douglas as Attorney Steven Hayden
- Lyle Talbot as Tex Irwin
- Lee Trent as "Dusty"
- Perc Launders as "Red"
- Wheaton Chambers as Sheriff
- Chief Thunderbird as Eagle Feather
- Tom Burton as Photographer
- Steve Winston as Cowboy
- Slim Whitaker as Cowboy
- Harry Clay as Hall
- Robert Andersen as Wally Waldron
- Edmund Glover as Frank Daley
- Mary Halsey as Cissy
- Daun Kennedy as Gloria
- Rosemary LaPlanche as Mary
- Chef Milani as Manager
- Elaine Riley as Cigarette girl
- Lawrence Tierney as Orchestra leader
- Shirley O'Hara as Hat check girl
- Patti Brill as Hat check girl
- Edward Clark as Coroner
- Joe Cody as Toni
- Bert Roach as Charlie
- Norman Willis as Callahan
- Kernan Cripps as Murphy
- William Nestell as Chef
- Zedra Conde as Carlita
- Norman Mayes as Pullman porter

== Production ==
The working title of this film was "The Falcon in Texas" with principal photography taking place from October 4 to early November 1943. (Note: Although not identified, the film was likely shot at the RKO "Encino Ranch", located on the outskirts of the City of Encino, California.)The Hollywood Reporter initially listed Richard Martin, Russell Wade, Bruce Edwards, Rita Corday, Margaret Landry, Dorothy Maloney and Barbara Lynn in the cast.

== Reception ==
In his review of The Falcon Out West, Bosley Crowther wrote, in The New York Times, "Anything for variety—that seems to be the policy of RKO with reference to its gentleman sleuth, the Falcon, hero of a long series of films. Now, for his latest adventure, flatly titled 'The Falcon Out West' —just so none of the customers is likely to be confused—the producers have meshed a whodunnit with Western atmosphere. The result is schematically novel; in other respects, it is old, familiar stuff. ... in the wide open spaces, where crooners and stock Indians roam, the Falcon goes through his old routine of spotting the guilty one. Tom Conway is still the dapper Falcon, Carole Gallagher and Barbara Hale are girls in the case, and Cliff Clark and Ed Gargan are, as usual, the dumb, uncooperative cops."

Film historians Richard Jewell and Vernon Harbin described The Falcon Out West, as "... sleuthing with standard horse-opera clichés including ambushes, runaway stagecoaches and chase scenes." The problem with the film was that Tom Conway was no longer nonchalant, but simply, "bored". In a recent review of the Falcon series for the Time Out Film Guide, Tom Milne wrote, "Conway, bringing a lighter touch to the series (which managed its comic relief better than most), starred in nine films after The Falcon's Brother, most of them deft and surprisingly enjoyable."

== See also ==
- List of American films of 1944
