= Annie Oakley (1935 film) =

1935 American biographical film directed by George Stevens

- Theatrical release poster
- Directed by: George Stevens
- Screenplay by: Joel Sayre; John Twist
- Story by: Joseph Fields; Ewart Adamson
- Produced by: Cliff Reid
- Starring: Barbara Stanwyck; Preston Foster; Melvyn Douglas; Moroni Olsen
- Cinematography: J. Roy Hunt
- Edited by: Jack Hively
- Music by: Alberto Colombo
- Production company: RKO Pictures
- Distributed by: RKO Pictures
- Release date: November 15, 1935 (US)
- Running time: 90 minutes
- Country: United States
- Language: English
- Budget: $354,000
- Box office: $620,000

Annie Oakley is a 1935 American Western film directed by George Stevens and starring Barbara Stanwyck, Preston Foster, Melvyn Douglas and Moroni Olsen. The film is based on the life of Annie Oakley.

== Plot ==
No fiction is stranger than the actual life of Annie Oakley who came out of a backwoods village half a century ago to astonish the world.

— Opening caption

In late 1800s, Annie Oakley, a young woman from the Ohio backwoods, delivers six dozen quail that she has shot to the owner of the general store. He sends them to the MacIvor Hotel in Cincinnati, where the mayor is holding a large banquet in honor of Toby Walker, the "greatest shot in the whole world." Toby is particular about what he eats, and hotel owner James MacIvor bought Annie's quail because she shoots the quail cleanly through the head, leaving no buckshot elsewhere.

At the banquet, Jeff Hogarth signs Toby to a contract, making him part of the Buffalo Bill's Wild West show. James challenges Toby to a shooting contest to take place the next morning. James arranges for "Andy" Oakley to compete against Walker, only to be shocked when Annie appears. The match ends in a draw, so they proceed to sudden death. The two sharpshooters continue hitting their targets. Following a comment from her mother, Annie deliberately misses her next shot. Walker is a gracious, though unsuspecting winner; Hogarth knows exactly what happened.

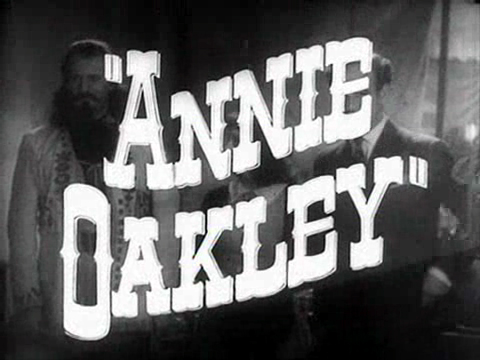
Title card for the trailer of Annie Oakley

When the Oakleys return home, Annie promises to reimburse all those who had bet on her. Jeff follows and tells Annie that he never bet the money that she had given him. He also invites her to join the Wild West show. Annie, having developed a crush on Toby, accepts. Jeff introduces her to Buffalo Bill and the other members of the show.

When Toby overhears Buffalo Bill telling Jeff that he might have to fire Annie because she lacks showmanship, he teaches her some shooting tricks.

At the first show, Sitting Bull is in the audience. Ned Buntline, Buffalo Bill's publicist, tries to enlist Sitting Bull for the show, but Sitting Bull is bored with the acts until he sees Annie shoot five targets thrown in the air. He is impressed and changes his mind to join the show.

A romance blossoms between Annie and Toby despite Jeff's attempts to win her affections. They also become good friends with Sitting Bull.

One day, a man with a grudge tries to shoot Sitting Bull. Toby grabs the man's gun just as it fires, saving Sitting Bull's life although his eyes are affected by the closeness of the shot. While Annie's fortunes rise, Toby's decline. He hides his injury but accidentally shoots Annie in the hand and is dismissed from the show. Annie is heartbroken but Jeff and Wild Bill try to keep Toby away from her. However, during a chance meeting, Annie is told by a woman accompanying Toby that she has only brought bad luck to Toby. Although Toby tries to stop the woman, Annie feels that what she says is true and unhappily retreats. After a triumphant tour of Europe, the show plays in New York City, where Sitting Bull spots Toby and reunites him with Annie.

== Cast ==
- Barbara Stanwyck as Annie Oakley
- Preston Foster as Toby Walker
- Melvyn Douglas as Jeff Hogarth
- Moroni Olsen as Col. William F. "Buffalo Bill" Cody
- Pert Kelton as Vera Delmar
- Andy Clyde as James MacIvor
- Chief Thunderbird as Sitting Bull
- Margaret Armstrong as Mrs. Oakley
- Delmar Watson as Wesley Oakley
- Adeline Craig as Susan Oakley

=== Uncredited ===
- Dick Elliott as Major Ned Buntline
- Theodore Lorch as Wild West Show Announcer
- Richard Alexander as Crown Prince Wilhelm
- Brandon Hurst as Doctor
- Philo McCullough as Officer
- Robert McKenzie as Sheriff Bixby
- Blue Washington as Cook
- Stepin Fetchit as cook's helper

== Production ==
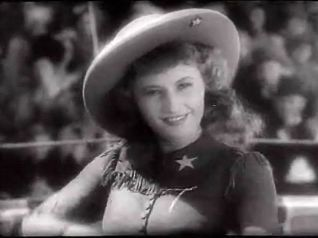
Barbara Stanwyck as Annie

The film was the first Western for both Stevens and Stanwyck. While based on the real life of Annie Oakley, it took some liberties with the historical details. The film focuses primarily on Oakley's love affair with Toby Walker (representing Oakley's real-life husband Frank E. Butler) rather than on her career as an exhibition sharpshooter. It also does not depict how Butler, himself a skilled marksman, willingly ceded the spotlight to Oakley in the Wild West shows. Several of the film's scenes, such as those in which Oakley deliberately loses a shooting match and Oakley and Walker are reunited by Sitting Bull, were likely concocted to appeal to contemporary audience tastes and expectations.

The working title for the film was "Shooting Star."

== Reception ==
The film was released less than ten years after the death of the real-life Oakley. It returned a profit of $48,000.

Andre Sennwald of The New York Times called the film a "gaudy and pungent motion picture, smacking healthily of that obscure commodity known as tanbark" and wrote: "Barbara Stanwyck is splendid in the title role; this is her most striking performance in a long time. Preston Foster plays persuasively, too, in the unrealized Toby Walker role, and Moroni Olsen is excellently bluff as Buffalo Bill. Chief Thunderbird, though, is the star of the picture. One scene, by the way, ought to give you a start. That is when the Kaiser, then only a Prince, gallantly holds a cigarette in his mouth for Annie to shoot at. What might have been the course of history, you find yourself wondering, if Annie had missed."

Decades later, Pauline Kael called Stanwyck "consistently fresh and believable" and wrote that Stevens "makes some of the points about race he made later in Giant... but here they're lighter and better. They seem to grow casually out of the American material; the movie feels almost improvised."
