= Pin-ups of Yank, the Army Weekly =

Photos of women in a US military weekly magazine

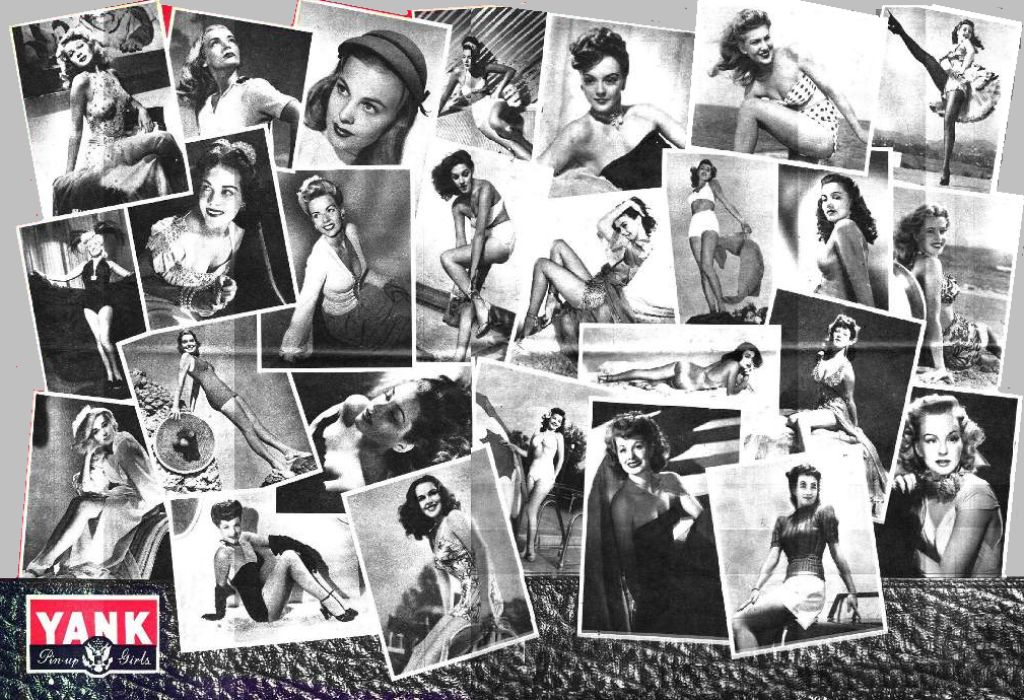
Collage of Yank pin-ups, published in the final issue, December 28, 1945

Yank, the Army Weekly was a weekly magazine published from 1942 through 1945 and distributed to members of the American military during World War II. Yank included war news, photography, and other features. It had a circulation of more than 2.6 million. One of its most popular features, intended to boost the morale of military personnel serving overseas, was the weekly publication of a pin-up photograph.

A feature story in Parade published in 1945 noted: "Excellent war reporting and photography, serious discussions of postwar problems and the now famous Sad Sack cartoons have made Yank welcome on far-flung battle lines. But the page most often torn out and tacked up for future reference on barrack walls and foot lockers is the one bearing the official insigne, 'Yank Pin-Up Girl.'"

Yank pin-ups were distributed to locations worldwide where American soldiers, sailors, and Marines were serving. In 1944, the Associated Press published a report that pin-up pictures from Yank were discovered on display on the wall of the chief's hut in a remote jungle village in Burma. According to an account published by the Central Press, American pilots in the Pacific planned to drop Yank pin-up photographs to Japanese soldiers with the inscription: "Eat your hearts out . . . Here's what we are fighting for."

== The models ==
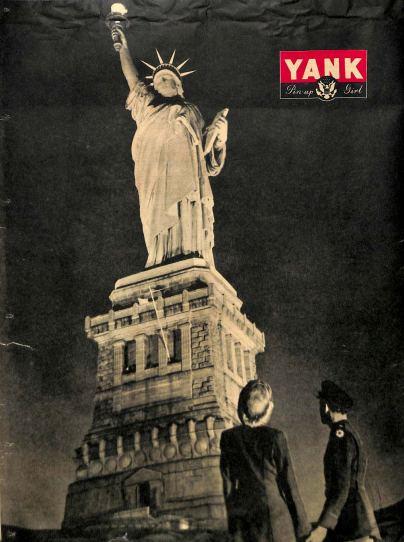
The Statue of Liberty featured as the "Yank pin-up girl" at the end of the war

The women who posed for the pin-ups included both famous and unknown actresses, dancers, athletes, and models. Betty Grable and Rita Hayworth, the most famous pin-up models of World War II, both appeared in Yank pin-ups. Grable appeared in June 1943 wearing a patriotic outfit standing in front of a large drum, and Hayworth in November 1943 in a black dress seated on steps decorated with musical notes and again in July 1944 wearing a two-piece bathing suit.

Other famous actresses featured as Yank pin-ups included Lauren Bacall (November 1944), Ava Gardner (September 1943), Ingrid Bergman (April 1944 and March 1945), Gene Tierney (February 1944 and March 1945), Jane Russell (January 1943, March 1943 (credited as "The Best-known Eyes in the Army"), and September 1945), Susan Hayward (October 1945), Donna Reed (April 1943 and November 1945), and Lucille Ball (July 1943 and March 1945). The women included as Yank pin-ups included at least two African-Americans: pianist and singer Hazel Scott (March 1943) and singer/actress Lena Horne (July 1943). A few women appeared three times as Yank pin-ups. They included actresses Ramsay Ames, Dusty Anderson, Anne Gwynne, Dolores Moran, and Jane Russell, big-band singer Janet Blair, and swimming champion and actress Esther Williams.

The models featured as Yank pin-ups included one man. In the May 30, 1943 issue, Yank featured a cover photograph of a soldier with the caption: "Pin-up for WAACs. This dog-tagged Dorothy Lamour is S Sgt. Charles Gardocki, and he's sweating out the war somewhere in the Pacific. Hirsute, h'ain't he?" In the issue dated August 24, 1945, published less than two weeks after Victory over Japan Day, Yank featured the Statue of Liberty as its first non-human "pin-up girl".

The following is a list of the women (and one man) featured in Yank pin-ups:

Name	Photo 1	Photo 2	Photo 3	Date	Source
Burnu Acquanetta				1944-09-01	
Ramsay Ames				1943-12-26; 1945-04-10; 1945-04-20	
Dusty Anderson				1943-11-07; 1945-12-14; 1944-10-27	
Gloria Anderson				1944-03-31; 1944-04-16	
Lois Andrews				1943-06-20	
Evelyn Ankers				1945-07-13	
Lenore Aubert				1943-04-18	
Vivian Austin				1945-11-09	
Bettye Avery				1943-10-31	
Lauren Bacall				1944-11-24	
Lucille Ball				1943-07-25; 1945-03-23	
Lynn Bari				1944-10-13	
Barbara Bates				1945-05-04	
Anne Baxter				1943-04-25	
Belita				1944-09-22	
Ingrid Bergman				1944-04-28; 1945-03-16	
Julie Bishop				1944-09-17	
Vivian Blaine				1944-08-18	
Janet Blair				1943-03-28; 1944-03-05; 1944-08-11	
Sherry Britton				1945-12-09	
Hazel Brooks				1944-12-22	
Leslie Brooks				1943-02-07; 1944-04-30	
Betty Bryant				1944-03-03	
Janis Carter				1945-01-05	
Marguerite Chapman				1943-10-10; 1944-11-17	
Pat Clark				1945-02-05; 1945-11-16	
Eileen Coghlan				1945-09-14	
Lois Collier				1944-01-23	
Peggy Corday				1944-06-23	
Ann Corio				1943-09-03	
Mildred Cowles					
Jeanne Crain				1944-06-30; 1945-08-31	
Betty Anne Cregan				1945-12-07	
Rita Daigle				1944-12-15	
Patricia Dane				1944-01-28	
Linda Darnell				1944-05-12	
Dorothy Day				1943-08-13	
Yvonne DeCarlo				1944-06-18	
Gloria DeHaven				1945-06-22	
Olivia de Havilland				1944-02-13	
Jo-Carroll Dennison				1943-07-30	
Dona Drake				1943-05-23	
Deanna Durbin				1945-01-19 (Continental edition)	
Jinx Falkenburg				1945-04-27	
Rhonda Fleming				1944-11-05	
Carole Gallagher				1944-02-11	
Mary Ganly				1944-11-10	
Ava Gardner				1943-09-05	
Charles Gardocki ("Pin-up for WAACs")				1943-05-30	
Cindy Garner				1945-04-06	
Frances Gifford				1943-05-16	
Betty Grable				1943-06-11; 1943-12-12	
Betty Jane Graham				1944-09-15	
Angela Greene				1944-07-14	
Anne Gwynne				1943-02-14; 1943-12-03; 1944-06-11	
June Haver				1945-05-02	
Susan Hayward				1945-10-26	
Rita Hayworth				1943-11-28; 1944-07-07	
Martha Holliday				1945-12-21	
Lena Horne				1943-07-04	
Betty Hutton				1943-01-24	
Mary Anne Hyde				1942-10-29	
Adele Jergens				1945-07-20; 1945-11-02	
Candy Jones				1945-01-12	
Virginia Kavanagh				1945-06-15	
Daun Kennedy				1945-10-19	
Evelyn Keyes				1944-03-04	
Andrea King				1945-08-10	
Elyse Knox				1943-10-22; 1945-08-17	
Veronica Lake				1943-02-21	
Hedy Lamarr				1943-05-09; 1943-11-14	
Carole Landis				1943-04-02	
Joan Lawrence				1944-07-28	
Joan Leslie				1943-08-29; 1945-09-18	
Diana Lewis				1944-01-02; 1944-12-08	
Marjorie Lord				1943-06-13	
Ida Lupino				1943-08-22; 1944-02-27	
Selene Mahri				1944-12-01	
Dorothy Malone				1945-04-13	
Gail Manners				1943-10-24	
Irene Manning				1944-03-24	
Madelon Mason				1945-07-06	
Virginia Mayo				1944-01-14	
Grace McDonald				1943-09-19	
Marie McDonald				1944-08-25	
Doris Merrick				1943-05-02	
Ann Miller				1943-12-19; 1945-06-29	
Maria Montez				1942-11-29	
Dolores Moran				1943-04-11; 1943-08-08; 1944-04-09	
Diana Mumby				1944-08-20	
Jane Nigh				1944-11-03	
Virginia O'Brien				1944-02-18	
Martha O'Driscoll				1944-04-14	
Maureen O'Hara				1943-05-30	
Sylvia Opert				1943-01-31	
Eleanor Parker				1943-08-01	
Jean Parker				1944-09-24	
Virginia Patton				1943-06-27	
Susan Peters				1943-07-11	
Nancy Porter				1945-06-08	
Frances Rafferty				1943-09-16; 1945-10-12	
Ella Raines				1944-07-09; 1945-08-17	
Jane Randolph				1942-06-17	
Donna Reed				1943-04-04; 1945-11-02	
Elaine Riley				1944-10-29	
Gale Robbins				1944	
Jean Rogers				1943-07-18	
Lina Romay				1945-05-18	
Jane Russell				1943-01-17; 1943-03-07 (credited as "The Best-known Eyes in the Army"); 1945-09-21	
Sheila Ryan				1944-05-05; 1945-07-27	
Ann Savage				1944-02-04	
Hazel Scott				1943-03-21	
Lizabeth Scott				1945-02-02; 1945-11-23	
Hilda Simms				1945-02-16	
Alexis Smith				1943-02-28; 1943-09-24; 1945-03-18	
Ann Sothern				1942-12-27	
Juanita Stark				1943-10-08	
K. T. Stevens				1944-05-19	
Gale Storm				1944-03-10	
Gene Tierney				1944-02-25; 1945-05-25	
Audrey Totter				1945-08-24	
Colleen Townsend				1944-12-29	
Jean Trent				1945-03-30	
Martha Vickers				1945-05-11	
June Vincent				1944-07-21	
Frances Vorne				1945-02-23	
Cheryl Walker				1944-06-16	
Bunny Waters				1943-09-12	
Wilde Twins				1945-08-03	
Chili Williams				1944-03-17	
Esther Williams				1943-03-14; 1944-04-23; 1945-10-12	
Teresa Wright				1943-01-10	
Nan Wynn				1943-06-06; 1944-01-09	
Audrey Young				1945-11-30	
