= Louis Macloon =

Louis Owen Macloon (20 May 1893 – 13 August 1979, age 86) was a prominent theatrical producer of the 1920s and 1930s.

== Family ==
Macloon was the son of Chicago Tribune reporter Charles Macloon and his wife, Josephine, née Owen.

Louis Macloon married three times:

- Lois Florence Hoover in 1916, divorced by 1922
- Lillian Albertson, in 1922, divorced in 1933
- Lucille Ryman, 1936 (also ended in divorce)

He had one child, a daughter, Ruth, by his first wife.

== Theatrical producer career ==
Macloon is credited with having given Clark Gable his first professional acting role, carrying a spear as a soldier. Later, Gable served as understudy to the role of Sergeant Quirk in What Price Glory by Laurence Stallings and Maxwell Anderson, another Macloon production. Macloon told Gable, "You'll do, my boy."

Macloon's career with producing partner and wife Lillian Albertson was prolific, marking over a decade of successful plays and musicals from New York to Chicago and Los Angeles, including It Pays to Sin, which they translated from Hungarian.

== Entrepreneur ==
Macloon was also an entrepreneur, and was a major investor in Almac Yacht Corporation, of Mystic, Connecticut, which built fifty foot Seven Seas Cruisers with interiors designed by Joseph Urban, the noted architect of the Ziegfeld Theatre.

== Death ==
Macloon died 13 August 1979 at age 86 in Baker City, Oregon.
