= George White's Scandals (1945 film) =

1945 film by Felix E. Feist

- Directed by: Felix E. Feist
- Written by: Hugh Wedlock Jr. Howard Snyder
- Screenplay by: Hugh Wedlock Jr. Howard Snyder; Parke Levy; Howard J. Green
- Produced by: George White
- Starring: Joan Davis; Jack Haley; Phillip Terry; Glenn Tryon; Margaret Hamilton
- Cinematography: Robert De Grasse
- Edited by: Joseph Noriega
- Music by: Constantin Bakaleinikoff
- Distributed by: RKO Pictures
- Release date: October 10, 1945
- Running time: 95 minutes
- Country: United States
- Language: English

George White's Scandals is a 1945 American screwball comedy starring Joan Davis, Jack Haley, Phillip Terry, and Glenn Tryon. It features Haley's Wizard of Oz co-star Margaret Hamilton. This film, produced by George White, included music by Edwin Finckel.

== Plot ==
At a Scandals Club reunion, comedienne Joan Mason announces her engagement to actor Jack Evans. While everyone is congratulating them, Jill Asbury, the daughter of former Scandals dancer Molly Hogan, introduces herself. Jack arrives with his sister Clarabelle, who reminds Jack of the promise he made to their dying mother that he would not marry until Clarabelle married. Clarabelle pulls Joan aside and tells her that she does not approve of their relationship and implies she is going to kill her. Joan expresses concern to Jack over his sister's seemingly violent nature, but Jack assures her that Clarabelle is eccentric but harmless.

At rehearsals the next day, manager Tom McGrath mistakes Jill for one of the chorus girls. Jill pretends to be a scandals girl and asks Joan to keep her secret. Tom, impressed with Jill's dancing, offers her the closing act of the show over another chorus girl named Billie Randall.

Jack and Joan conspire to set Clarabelle up with a male escort, believing that it will change her cynical outlook on romance. Jack throws a surprise birthday party for Clarabelle, and Joan introduces her to the escort. She initially rejects his advances before she begins to warm up to him, until she discovers Joan hired him to seduce her. Clarabelle attacks Joan and throws an axe at her, causing Joan to call off her engagement with Jack.

Billie exposes Jill's true identity as an aristocrat and turns her in to the British Embassy. A representative comes to talk her out of the show, and Tom becomes angry upon finding out that she lied. Embarrassed, Jill leaves the show. Jack and Joan reconcile and Jack tells Clarabelle that the two are going to get married.

Joan tells Tom to keep searching for Jill in order to get her back in the show, and goes to confront Billie. She ends up causing a scene painter to accidentally drop a gallon of paint onto Billie's head and drop a sandbag on Clarabelle, knocking her out. Jill's parents arrive and express their support for her performance. Jack spots Jill in the audience, and when she realizes her parents are in attendance, she decides to perform. Afterwards, Clarabelle wakes up showing no animosity towards Joan, having seemingly forgotten who she is.

== Cast ==
- Joan Davis as Joan Mason
- Jack Haley as Jack Evans
- Phillip Terry as Tom McGrath
- Martha Holliday as Jill Martin
- Margaret Hamilton as Clarabelle Evans
- Glenn Tryon as George White
- Sam Ash as Nightclub Manager
- Rose Murphy as Hilda (Joan's maid)
- Jane Greer as Billie Randall (Billed as Bettyjane Greer)
