= Frances Vorne =

American model (1920–1990)

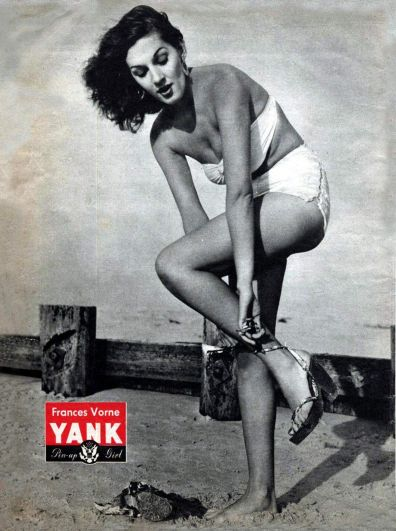
- Vorne in her parachute bathing suit, 1944
- Born: May 30, 1920
- Died: August 8, 1990 (aged 70)
- Other names: The Shape
- Occupation: Model

Frances Vorne (May 30, 1920 – August 8, 1990) was an American model and pin-up girl. During World War II, she was known as "the Shape".

== Early years ==
Vorne was raised in New York. She spoke and read Russian and Ukrainian fluently. In his book, The Pin-Up Girls of World War II, Brett Kiser wrote that Vorne was a "simple" and "modest" girl with an "awe-inspiring anatomy" who never drank alcohol, never visited night clubs, and avoided staying out late.

== Career ==
Vorne gained fame as a pin-up model during World War II. In 1944, a soldier friend returned home from the war and gave her remnants of a German parachute. There was enough cloth to make an "abbreviated bathing suit". A pin-up of Vorne wearing the parachute-turned-swimsuit appeared in Army publications and was then posted "in more than half a million pin-up spaces in barracks and wherever else our fighting men happen to be". Author Brett Kiser described the photograph's impact:

Countless soldiers pinned up Frances's most famous pin-up still ... Not only was the pin-up Frances's personal favorite, but it was one of the most sought after pin-up photographs of the war years.

According to an account published by the Central Press, American pilots in the Pacific planned to drop photographs of Vorne to Japanese soldiers with the inscription: "Eat your hearts out ... Here's what we are fighting for". The photograph became so famous it reportedly won a movie contract for Vorne. After the photograph appeared in the London's Daily Mirror, the British Ministry of Information sought permission to use it in "stimulating the morale of Britain's Army and Navy".

In January 1945, Time magazine wrote that Vorne "wound up 1944 with perhaps the best claim to an honor publicity agents fight desperately over: the crown as Pin-Up Girl of the Year".

In 1945, Vorne appeared in "Water Follies of 1945", a water show at the Flushing Meadow Amphitheatre. According to promotions for the show, she appeared in her "glass bathing suit". Columnist Earl Wilson wrote that Vorne's glass bathing suit was "pliable enough to swim in" and "transparent", requiring the user to wear a bra and small pantie under the glass.

In 1946, Vorne was featured in a mail-order newsreel movie titled Swim Suit Revue, appearing in both her famous parachute bathing suit and a "diaper-style" suit.

== See also ==
- Pin-ups of Yank, the Army Weekly
