= Massacre (1934 film) =

1934 American drama film directed by Alan Crosland

- Lobby card
- Directed by: Alan Crosland
- Screenplay by: Robert Gessner; Ralph Block
- Story by: Ralph Block; Sheridan Gibney
- Produced by: Robert Presnell, Sr.
- Starring: Richard Barthelmess; Ann Dvorak
- Cinematography: George Barnes
- Edited by: Terry O. Morse
- Music by: Bernhard Kaun
- Production company: First National Pictures
- Distributed by: Warner Bros. Pictures
- Release date: January 20, 1934
- Running time: 70 minutes
- Country: United States
- Language: English

Massacre is a 1934 American pre-Code drama film directed by Alan Crosland. The film stars Richard Barthelmess and Ann Dvorak as its Native American protagonists, and also features Charles Middleton, Sidney Toler, Claire Dodd and Clarence Muse.

== Plot ==
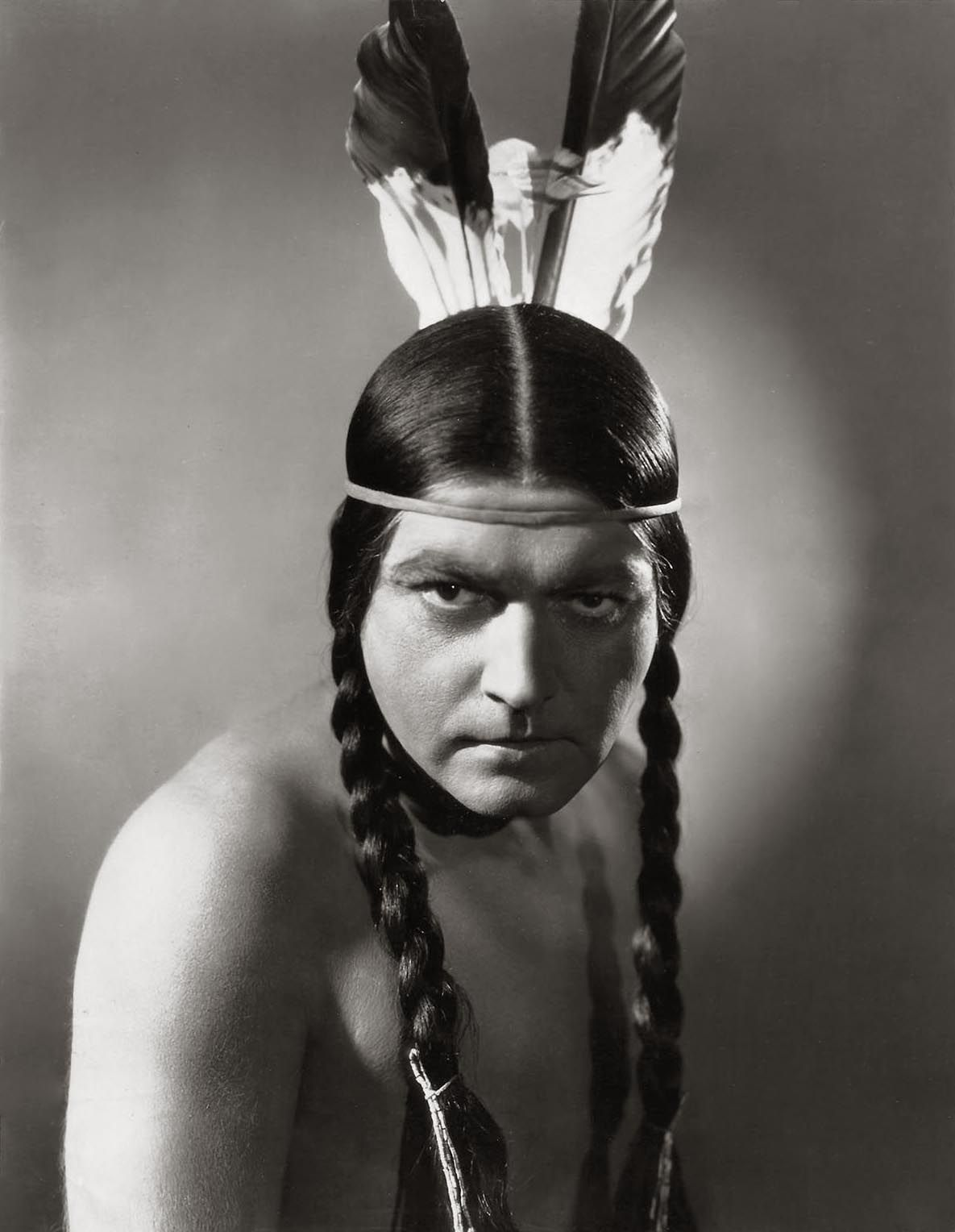
Richard Barthelmess in a publicity still for the film.

Chief Joe Thunderhorse is the star of a wild west show at the Century of Progress in Chicago. Though he is the son of a Native American chief, he has lived away from the reservation so long that he has lost all personal connection to his people. In his youth, he attended Haskell Institute and never went back. At the wild west show, Joe's Native identity and physical prowess are exploited by white showmen, and his rich white girlfriend flaunts him in front of her curious friends.

Upon learning that his father Black Pony is on his death bed, Joe and his African American valet, Sam, travels to the Stone Eagle Reservation to see him. Joe encounters Elihu P. Quissenberry, a white man who is the reservation's federal government agent. Quissenberry prefers dealing with other white men and talks with them about "the Indian Problem."

Joe's dying father no longer recognizes him. After other family members tell Joe that the white government doctor, Doc Turner, has never been by to check on his father, Joe's father tells him the government never changes.

Joe confronts Doc Turner, who pulls a gun on him, but Joe knocks him out and leaves. He then disrupts a publicity stunt featuring Chief Black Star, a Black front-man for Kicakpoo Indian remedies. When Black Star's white handlers dismiss questions about money for the Native community, Joe ruins the film footage, threatens Black Star, and punches a white marketer, ending the stunt.

Joe returns home as his father dies. At the funeral, he refuses a white Reverend's burial and sends his brother Adam to find a Native man for the rites. Meanwhile, his 15-year-old sister Jennie is taken away and raped by Thomas Shanks, the undertaker and a white government agent. Discovering Jennie in distress, Joe learns the truth and pursues Shanks in a high-speed car chase through the reservation. He lassos Shanks and drags him down the dirt road. That night, the Natives perform a traditional funerary ceremony for Joe's father.

The next morning, Quissenberry is warned about Joe's violent and "pagan" behavior. After a tense exchange, Quissenberry orders Joe's arrest. A staged trial with a sham defense leads to Joe's lawyer saying he pleads guilty; Joe is heavily fined and jailed.

A college-educated Native woman, Lydia, helps Joe escape jail. While law enforcement search for him, Joe travels to Washington D.C. to meet the Commissioner of Indian Affairs, J.R. Dickinson, who blames "water power, oil rights, cattle rangers, timber" for blocking pro-Native legislation. Government officials and Joe engage in a complicated dialogue about Native American land, rights, and their relationship with the United States government, leading Joe to declare, "You used to shoot the Indian down. Now you should cheat him, starve him, kill him off by dirt and disease. It's a massacre anyway you take it."

Joe is arrested for Shanks' murder, and Quissenberry has Jennie kidnapped before she can testify. Fearing Joe will be executed, the Native men of the reservation break Joe out of jail, burning down the courthouse in the process. Joe pleads with the crowd, trying to avoid another massacre. The Native men track down Jennie by beating White Feather, a Native policeman, and discover White Feather has abused Jennie.

When the government agents arrive, Quissenberry shoots Joe unprovoked and is arrested along with White Feather. Joe is acquitted, and both Quissenberry and Doc Turner are removed from office. Joe is revealed to have survived being shot. Standing high on the rocks, he and Lydia reunite with Joe taking a job in the Indian Service at Stone Eagle Reservation.

== Cast ==
- Richard Barthelmess as Chief Joe Thunder Horse
- Ann Dvorak as Lydia
- Dudley Digges as Elihu P. Quissenberry
- Claire Dodd as Norma
- Henry O'Neill as J.R. Dickinson
- Robert Barrat as Dawson
- Arthur Hohl as Dr. Turner
- Sidney Toler as Thomas Shanks
- Clarence Muse as Sam
- Charles Middleton as Sheriff Scatters
- Tully Marshall as Jake
- Wallis Clark as Cochran
- William V. Mong as Grandy
- DeWitt Jennings as Sheriff Jennings
- Juliet Ware as Mrs. Trevor
- James Eagles as Adam Thunderhorse
- Frank McGlynn Sr. as Missionary
- Agnes Narcha as Jennie Thunderhorse
- Irving Bacon as Secretary
- William Bailey as Investigation Attendant
- Hank Bell as Cowboy Selling Rope
- Chief John Big Tree as Indian Judge
- George Blackwood as Charles Moffitt
- Sidney Bracey as Norma's Butler
- Eddy Chandler as Deputy
- Corleen Clemons as Indian
- Iron Eyes Cody as Indian
- William B. Davidson as Sen. Beale
- Mildred Dixon as Party Guest
- Douglass Dumbrille as Sen. Emory - Chairman
- Philip Faversham as Intern
- Barbara Felker as Indian Girl
- Julia Griffith as Hearing Spectator
- Samuel S. Hinds as Judge Eldridge
- Noble Johnson as Indian Leader
- Edward Keane as Prosecutor
- Milton Kibbee as Dickinson's Secretary
- Henry Kolker as Sen. Woolsey
- Artie Ortego as Indian on Raid
- George Reed as Chief Black Star
- Cliff Saum as Cameraman
- Harry Seymour as Indian Show Barker
- Luther Standing Bear as Indian
- Chief Thunderbird as Indian
- Victoria Vinton as Souvenir Hunter
- Niles Welch as Arena Announcer

== See also ==
- Pre-Code Hollywood
