= Ballet Robotique =

1982 film by Bob Rogers

Ballet Robotique is a 1982 short film by Bob Rogers, and BRC Imagination Arts, previously known as Bob Rogers & Company.

== Summary ==
Robots in General Motors automobile factories building cars to classical music (Bizet, Delibes and Tchaikovsky) performed by the Royal Philharmonic Orchestra in movements.

== Accolades ==
- 1982: ALA Notable Children's Videos
- 1983: Academy Award for Best Live Action Short Film nomination.
- 1983: Columbus International Film & Video Festival winner, Bronze Plaque Award.
- 1983: Salerno Film Festival winner, Festival Trophy.
- 1983: WorldFest Houston winner, Grand Award, Best Short Subject.
