= Robert Sklar =

American historian

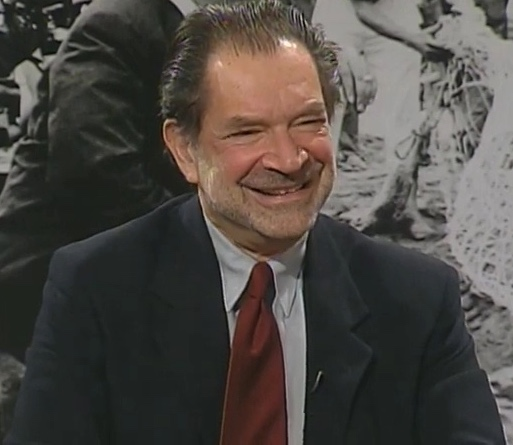
- Sklar on CUNY TV's City Cinematheque, 1999
- Born: Robert Anthony Sklar; December 3, 1936; New Brunswick, New Jersey, U.S.
- Died: July 2, 2011 (aged 74); Barcelona, Catalonia, Spain
- Occupations: Film scholar; journalist
- Relatives: Marty Sklar (brother)

Academic background
- Education: Princeton University; Harvard University
- Thesis: F. Scott Fitzgerald: The Last Laocoon (1965)

Academic work
- Institutions: University of Michigan; Tisch School of the Arts
- Main interests: Film history

Robert Anthony Sklar (December 3, 1936 – July 2, 2011) was an American historian and author specializing in the history of cinema.

Sklar began his career as a reporter for the Los Angeles Times. He received a Ph.D. in the History of American Civilization from Harvard University in 1965. In 1968, he signed the "Writers and Editors War Tax Protest" pledge, vowing to refuse tax payments in protest against the Vietnam War.

He was a history professor at the University of Michigan, and in 1977, became a professor of cinema in the Department of Cinema Studies at New York University Tisch School of the Arts.

== Early life and biography ==
Sklar was born on December 3, 1936, in New Brunswick, New Jersey. His father was a high school teacher in Highland Park, New Jersey. Sklar was 9 years old when his family moved to Long Beach, California, where he went to Long Beach Polytechnic High School and was the editor of the school newspaper. Later, at Princeton University, Sklar served as chairman of the editorial board of The Daily Princetonian. After receiving his bachelor's degree in 1958, he worked on the rewrite desk in the Associated Press bureau in Newark and as a writer and reporter for the Los Angeles Times before doing graduate study at the University of Bonn on a Fulbright Scholarship from 1959 to 1960.

Sklar received a doctorate from Harvard in 1965. His dissertation became the title of his first book, F. Scott Fitzgerald: The Last Laocoon (1967).

Sklar was married twice and had two children. He had an older brother, Marty Sklar, who was the former creative head of Walt Disney Imagineering. On July 2, 2011, Sklar died while on vacation in Barcelona, aged 74, from a brain injury sustained in a bicycle accident.

== Books ==
- Sklar, Robert (1967). F. Scott Fitzgerald: The Last Laocoön. London, New York: Oxford University Press.
- Sklar, Robert (1980). Prime-Time America: Life on and Behind the Television Screen. Oxford University Press.
- Sklar, Robert (2002) [1990]. Film: An International History of the Medium (2 ed.). Prentice Hall. ISBN 0130340499.
- Sklar, Robert (1992). City boys: Cagney, Bogart, Garfield. Princeton University Press. ISBN 978-0-691-04795-9. OCLC 24318057.
- Sklar, Robert (1994) [1975]. Movie-Made America: A Cultural History of American Movies. New York: Vintage Books. ISBN 978-0-679-75549-4. OCLC 499793364.
- Sklar, Robert; Zagarrio, Vito (1998). Frank Capra: Authorship and the Studio System. Temple University Press. ISBN 1439904898.
- Putnam, Michael (2000). Silent Screens: The Decline and Transformation of the American Movie Theater. Johns Hopkins University Press. ISBN 0801863295. (with an introductory essay by Robert Sklar)
- Sklar, Robert (2002). A World History of Film. Harry N. Abrams. ISBN 0810906066.
- Sklar, Robert; Giovacchini, Saverio (2011). Global Neorealism: The Transnational History of a Film Style.
