= Cindy Garner =

American actress (1926–2002)

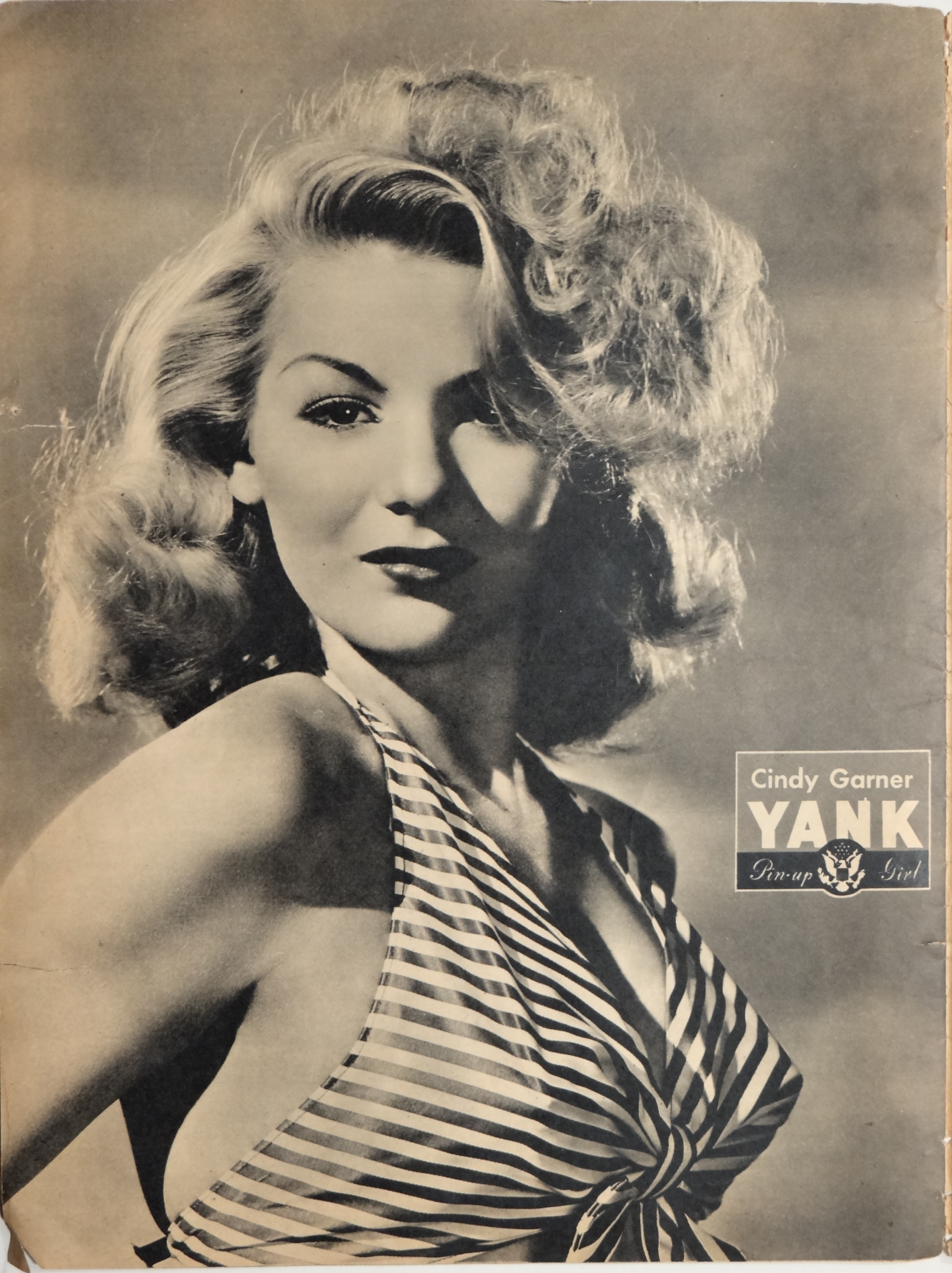
- 1945 pin-up photo
- Born: December 21, 1926; High Point, North Carolina, U.S.
- Died: January 2, 2002 (aged 75); Sanford, North Carolina, U.S.
- Occupations: Actress, model, journalist
- Spouse(s): Elmo Marshall (divorced); Jerry Gray (divorced)
- Children: 1

Dorothy Elizabeth Garner (December 21, 1926 – January 2, 2002) was an American actress and model.

== Early years ==
Born in High Point, North Carolina, Dorothy Elizabeth Garner was the daughter of Douglas and Eula Garner. She had two brothers, Neallei "Neal" Harrison (born 1918) and Joel Martin (born 1921). Before she graduated from High Point High School in 1941, she began working for the High Point Beacon newspaper, where her duties include writing the weekly Personality Parade column. She later operated a switchboard at a hotel.

== Career ==
Garner married a military man and moved to California, where he was stationed. Working as a cigarette girl at Ciro's nightclub, she was discovered by film executive Henry Willson. In 1943, she was introduced as a new member of the Goldwyn Girls dancing troupe. She did well enough in a bit part in David O. Selznick's film Since You Went Away that she was put under contract with his Vanguard Films in 1944. She signed a long-term contract with Universal-International in 1951, but the studio later ended it. Garner's other films included One Sunday Afternoon (1948), Flame of Araby (1951), and Red Ball Express (1952).

As a result of her modeling, Garner's picture appeared on magazines distributed nationally, including Pic, Hit, Yank, Esquire, Modern Romance, and Modern Screen. She also was featured in pictures accompanying a Popular Photography article, Pin-ups or Trip-ups, in 1945.

Garner was also active in visiting veterans' hospitals and making personal appearances on bond tours.

== Later years ==
After Universal-International terminated Garner's contract and she and her husband separated, she had a nervous breakdown. She and her daughter moved to separate sites in North Carolina. Garner went to her mother's home, and the daughter lived with a relative. Garner never recovered from her mental health problems despite stays in hospitals and treatments that included electroshock therapy and a lobotomy.

== Personal life ==
In the mid-1940s, Garner's marriage to her serviceman husband ended. She then married Elmo Marshall, and they had a daughter, Cathy Jo.

She died on January 2, 2002, in Sanford, North Carolina.

== Filmography ==
- Show Business (1944)
- Since You Went Away (1944)
- Up In Arms (1944)
- You Came Along (1945)
- A Scandal in Paris (1946)
- Till the End of Time (1946)
- One Sunday Afternoon (1948)
- Flame of Araby (1951)
- Meet Danny Wilson (1952)
- Red Ball Express (1952)
- Ma and Pa Kettle at Waikiki (1955)

== See also ==
- Pin-ups of Yank, the Army Weekly
