= The Fighting American =

1924 film

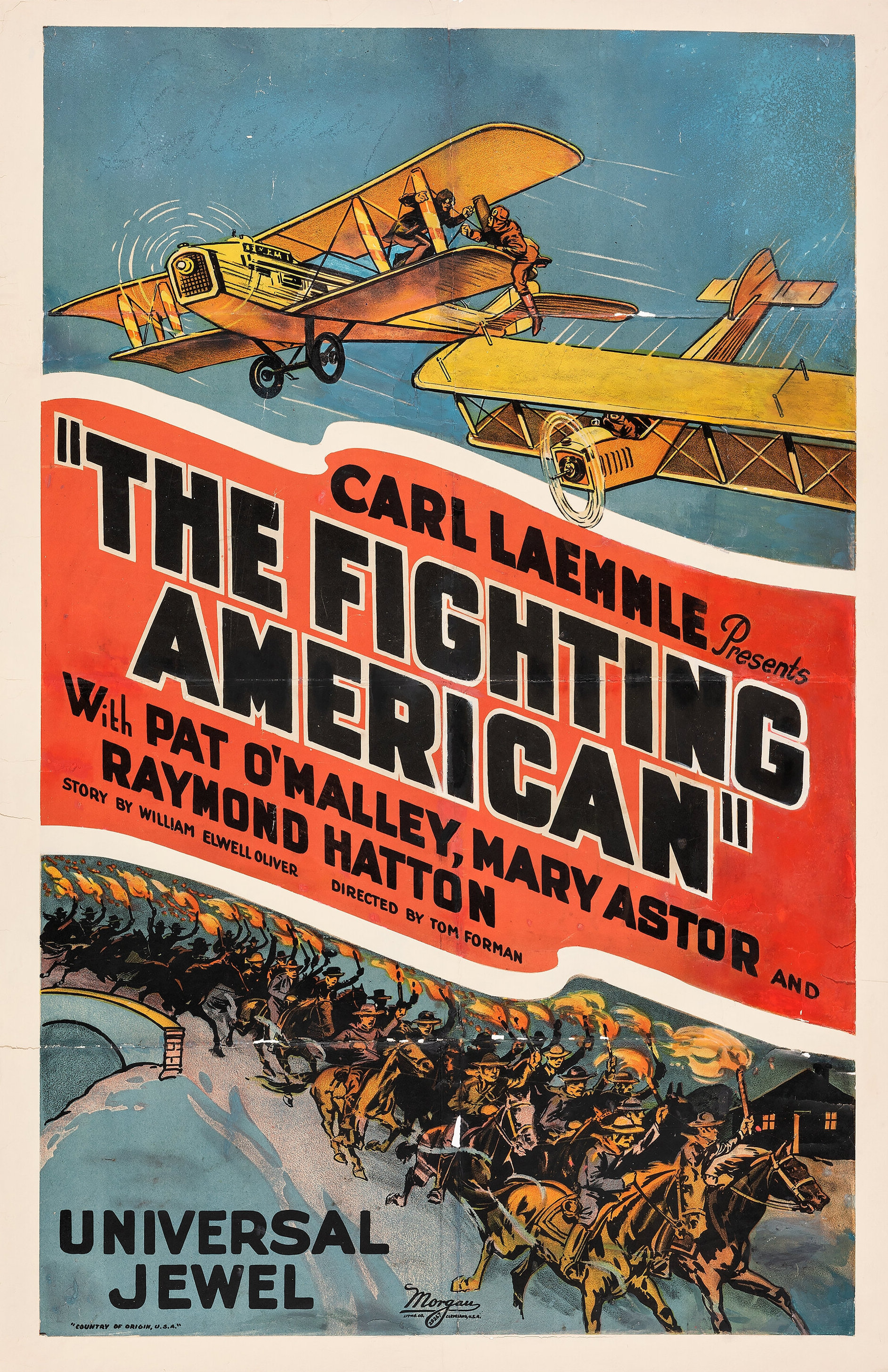
- Theatrical release poster
- Directed by: Tom Forman
- Written by: Harvey Gates
- Screenplay by: Raymond L. Schrock
- Story by: William Elwell Oliver
- Based on: Adaptation by Raymond L. Schrock of a screen story by William Elwell Oliver
- Produced by: Carl Laemmle
- Starring: Pat O'Malley; Mary Astor; Raymond Hatton
- Cinematography: Harry Perry
- Production company: Universal Pictures (as Universal Pictures Corporation)
- Distributed by: Universal Pictures
- Release date: May 26, 1924
- Running time: 6 reels; 5,251 feet
- Country: United States
- Languages: Silent; English intertitles

The Fighting American (also known as The Fighting Adventurer) is a surviving 1924 American silent romantic drama film produced and distributed by Universal Pictures and directed by Tom Forman. The young Mary Astor plays a young college student who is the object of desire in the eyes of the hero.

== Plot ==
The Fighting American (1924)

Bill Pendleton, son of a wealthy shipowner, goes to fight in the war as a pilot. He has trouble concentrating on his studies and as a happy-go-lucky college student adept at both flying and football, he accepts a wager from his fraternity pals that he will propose to any female student they choose.

Mary O'Malley is chosen by his pals and, unaware of the wager, accepts Bill's fraternity pin. She is an old-fashioned young woman who is secretly in love with him. Bill having proposed to her in earnest, is also in love. Mary, however, hears about the wager and thoroughly disgusted with Bill, leaves college and goes to China to join her missionary father.

A remorseful Bill ends up being kicked out of college, and his father also disowns him. He decides to follow Mary to China in order to redeem himself. He stows away on the same ship that Mary is taking to China.

When the Chinese revolutionary, Fu Shing, kidnaps Mary, Bill has to figure out how to save her. He enlists the help of his friend, Danny Daynes, an alcoholic war veteran now serving as a general in the Chinese army.

In an exciting battle in the sky, Bill ends up rescuing Mary and her father from a band of revolutionaries.

== Cast ==
- Pat O'Malley as Bill Pendleton
- Mary Astor as Mary O'Mallory
- Raymond Hatton as Denny Daynes and Po-Hsing-Chien
- Warner Oland as Fu Shing
- Taylor Carroll as W.F. Pendleton
- Clarence Geldart as William A. Pendleton
- Alfred Fisher as Mr. O'Mallory
- Jack Byron as Alfred Rutland
- James Wang as Lee Yong
- Emmett King as College Professor
- Jane Starr as Lizzie
- Frank Kingsley as Harry March
- Ed Brady

== Production ==
The plot of The Fighting American was a romantic satire penned by William Elwell Oliver, the winner of a writing contest that Universal Studios held for college students. The working title of the film was "The Throwback."

A spectacular aerial stunt appeared in The Fighting American where two stuntmen fought on the wings of a Curtiss JN-4 with one stuntman falling off the wing. Instead of falling to his death, the falling stuntman doubled by former circus acrobat Russel Benton, swung in pendulum style onto the other wing tip. (Note: The stunt was accomplished by having wires tied to the stuntman's ankles and the aircraft landing gear, allowing a pendulum swing below the aircraft.)

Two Curtiss JN-4s flew out of Clover Field near Houston, with one acting as a camera platform flown by Frank Tomick and the other aircraft flown by Leo Nomis.

== Reception ==
The review in The New York Times considered The Fighting American as "pleasant nonsense". The review noted: "In the introductory title of "The Fighting American," the film presentation at the Broadway this week, Carl Laemmle, President of Universal Pictures Corporation, explains that the production is not one to tax the mentality of the spectators, who must look upon the narrative as nonsense."

Reviewer Janiss Garza recounted in her review for Allmovie.com, that some aerial scenes in The Fighting American were exciting.

== Censorship ==
Before the film could be exhibited in Kansas, the Kansas Board of Review required the removal of all scenes where people are drinking or are holding bottles.

== Preservation ==
Prints of The Fighting American exist in private film collections [16mm reduction positives, 8mm reduction positives].
