= Carole Gallagher =

American actress (1923–1966)

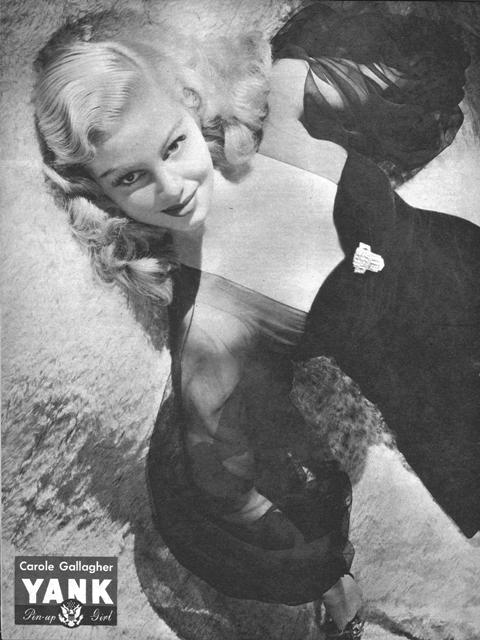
- Gallagher in 1944
- Born: February 24, 1923; San Francisco, California, U.S.
- Died: August 29, 1966 (aged 43); Los Angeles, California, U.S.
- Resting place: Forest Lawn Memorial Park, Glendale, California
- Occupation: Actress
- Years active: 1942–1949
- Spouse: Dick Foran (m. 1943; div. 1945)
- Children: 1

Carole Gallagher (February 24, 1923 – August 29, 1966) was an American film actress and the second wife of actor Dick Foran. She is best known for her roles in The Falcon Out West (1944) and The Denver Kid (1948).

== Personal life and death ==
Gallagher married actor Dick Foran in 1943. They had a son together, Sean Nicolas Foran. She would later file for divorce in 1944, in which Gallagher described her marriage to Foran as abusive, a judge later order him to pay her $250 monthly for support for their son. The divorce completed in 1945. She died in 1966 at the age of 43 in Los Angeles, California and was buried in Forest Lawn Memorial Park, Glendale, California.

== Selected filmography ==
- Gangway for Tomorrow (1943) - Peanuts Harris (uncredited)
- The Falcon and the Co-eds (1943) - Elsie, co-ed (uncredited)
- Girl Crazy (1943) - Showgirl (uncredited)
- The Falcon Out West (1944) - Vanessa Drake
- Secret Service Investigator (1948) - Newspaper Flirt (uncredited)
- The Denver Kid (1948) - Barbara
- Homicide for Three (1948) - Drunk (uncredited)
- Blondie's Secret (1948) - First Bathing Girl in Dream (uncredited)
- Sands of Iwo Jima (1949) - USO woman (uncredited)

== See also ==
- Pin-ups of Yank, the Army Weekly
