= It Pays to Sin =

American play

It Pays to Sin is an American play in four scenes with an English adaptation by Louis Macloon and George Redman from the Hungarian by Johann Vaszary.

The Broadway production was directed by Monty Collins at the Morosco Theatre, opening on November 3, 1933, and closing on November 5, 1933. It survived only 3 performances, receiving scathing reviews from the critics. Leon Ames, who played David Janossy (credited as "Leon Waycoff") and Garnett Lucille Ryman, who played Greta Kasda (credited as Jane Starr), each made their Broadway debut. Victor Sutherland played Zoltan Keleti.
