= Red Ball Express (film) =

1952 World War II film directed by Budd Boetticher

- Theatrical release poster
- Directed by: Budd Boetticher
- Screenplay by: John Michael Hayes
- Story by: Marcy Klauber (as Marcel Klauber); William Grady Jr. (as Billy Grady Jr.)
- Produced by: Aaron Rosenberg
- Starring: Jeff Chandler; Alex Nicol
- Cinematography: Maury Gertsman
- Edited by: Edward Curtiss
- Color process: Black and white
- Production company: Universal Pictures
- Distributed by: Universal Pictures
- Release dates: May 24, 1952 (Los Angeles); May 29, 1952 (New York City); July 4, 1952 (United States)
- Running time: 83 minutes
- Country: United States
- Language: English
- Box office: $1.5 million (US rentals)

Red Ball Express is a 1952 American World War II war film directed by Budd Boetticher and starring Jeff Chandler and Alex Nicol, featuring early screen appearances by Sidney Poitier and Hugh O'Brian. The film is based on the Red Ball Express convoys that took place after the D-Day landings in Normandy in June 1944.

== Plot ==
In August 1944, Patton's Third Army has advanced so far following the D-Day invasion toward Paris that it cannot be supplied. To maintain the momentum, Allied headquarters establishes an elite military truck route. One racially integrated platoon of this Red Ball Express encounters private enmities, German resistance, minefields, and increasingly perilous missions.

Lt. Chick Campbell, head of the platoon, clashes with Sgt. Red Kallek over an incident that occurred when they were civilian truck drivers and resulted in the death of Kallek's brother.

== Cast ==
- Jeff Chandler as Lieutenant Chick Campbell
- Alex Nicol as First Sergeant "Red" Kallek
- Charles Drake as Private Ronald Partridge / The Narrator
- Judith Braun as Joyce McClellan
- Sidney Poitier as Corporal Andrew Robertson
- Jaqueline Duval as Antoinette Dubois
- Bubber Johnson as Private "Taffy" Smith
- Davis Roberts as Private Dave McCord
- Hugh O'Brian as Private Wilson
- Frank Chase as Private Higgins
- Cindy Garner as Kitty Walsh
- Gregg Palmer as Tank Lieutenant
- John Hudson as Tank Sergeant Max
- Jack Kelly as Heyman
- Howard Petrie as Major General Lee Gordon

The character of General Gordon appears to have been loosely based on General Patton, although Patton is also specifically mentioned in the film. Major General Frank Ross, who was in charge of the actual Red Ball Express, acted as a technical adviser.

== Controversy ==
Because of the high percentage of African-American drivers in the Red Ball Express operation, the Department of Defense insisted to Universal that the film be modified so that "the positive angle be emphasized" regarding race relations. Director Budd Boetticher claimed:

The army wouldn't let us tell the truth about the black troops because the government figured they were expendable. Our government didn't want to admit they were kamikaze pilots. They figured if one out of ten trucks got through, they'd save Patton and his tanks.
