= Marty Sklar =

American businessman

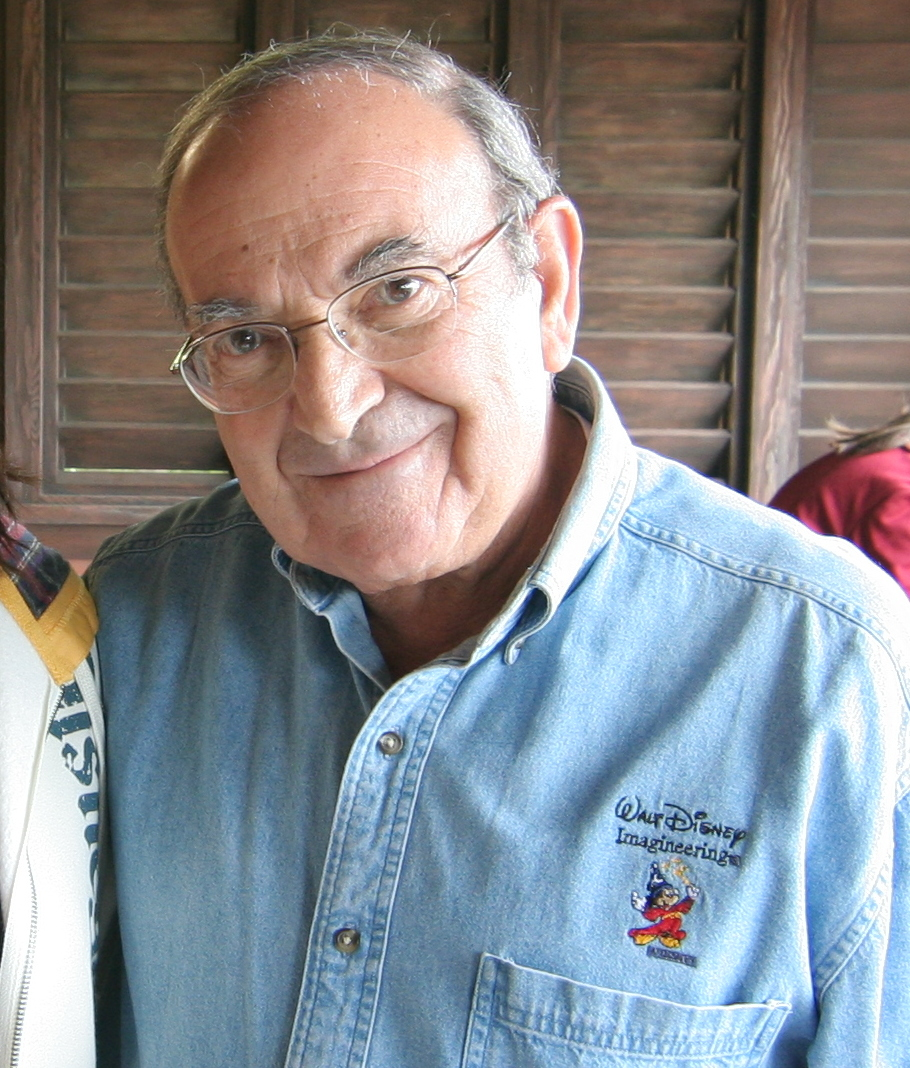
- Sklar in 2011
- Born: Martin A. Sklar; February 6, 1934; New Brunswick, New Jersey
- Died: July 27, 2017 (aged 83); Hollywood Hills, California
- Education: UCLA
- Occupation: Imagineer
- Years active: 1956–2009
- Relatives: Robert Sklar (brother)

Martin A. Sklar (February 6, 1934 – July 27, 2017) was a scriptwriter and construction developer. He was The Walt Disney Company's international ambassador for Walt Disney Imagineering, the subsidiary of the company which designs and constructs Disney theme parks and resorts across the world. He was formerly vice president of Concepts and Planning for the company, before being promoted to president, then vice chairman and principal creative executive before his final role. Disney honored him with a Disneyland window dedication ceremony on his date of retirement, July 17, 2009.

== Early life, family and education ==
Sklar was born in New Brunswick, New Jersey. While attending University of California, Los Angeles, he was editor of its Daily Bruin newspaper in 1955.

== Career ==
While in college, working at the school's newspaper as its editor, Sklar was recruited to create a 1950s-themed newspaper, The Disneyland News, a month before the theme park opened. After graduating, he joined Disneyland full-time in 1956, where he held responsibility for most of the park's publicity and marketing materials.

In 1961, he moved to WED Enterprises (renamed Walt Disney Imagineering in 1986), where he worked on attractions for the 1964 New York World's Fair. Among the attractions he helped to design during this period were the Enchanted Tiki Room and It's a Small World, the latter originally for the World's Fair. For nearly 10 years, he wrote personal materials for Walt Disney for use in publications, television and special films. In 1974 he became vice president of concepts/planning, and guided the creative development of EPCOT Center (now known as Epcot) at Florida's Walt Disney World Resort.

As Vice-President of Creative Development, Executive Vice-President and then President of Imagineering for nine years, Sklar supervised the design and construction of Tokyo Disneyland, the Disney-MGM Studios, Disneyland Paris, Disney's Animal Kingdom, Disney California Adventure Park, Tokyo DisneySea, the Walt Disney Studios Park and Hong Kong Disneyland. Former Disneyland International chairman Jim Cora later said of him, "He understands the Disney way, because he learned it at Walt's knee. He is the keeper of the keys, the conscience, the Jiminy Cricket for the organization."

On February 16, 2006, Jay Rasulo, then-chairman of Walt Disney Parks and Resorts (the unit of The Walt Disney Company which serves as the umbrella for Walt Disney Imagineering) announced that Sklar would resign from his current position and take up the new position of international ambassador for Walt Disney Imagineering. The occupation entails travelling around to art and design and architecture colleges, universities and other institutions around the world, offering seminars and attracting new talent to the company, as well as being a presence at future attraction and park openings, representing the company. Sklar said in a joint statement, "I knew that as my 72nd birthday and my 50th Disney anniversary approached, I would look for new challenges, so when Jay Rasulo asked me to talk about the future, I was 'all ears' to a challenging proposal Jay made. It not only seems to be one of those ideas that is overdue, but it was clear to me that I am the perfect casting (perhaps the only candidate) capable of originating and organizing this assignment." After 53 years of service, he left The Walt Disney Company and Walt Disney Imagineering on July 17, 2009, Disneyland's 54th anniversary. He was honored with a window on Main Street, U.S.A. in Disneyland on his final day.

Sklar's autobiography, Dream It! Do It!: My Half-Century Creating Disney's Magic Kingdoms, was published in 2013.

== Honors and awards ==
In 2001, Sklar was recognized as a Disney Legend. He served as President of Ryman Arts, whose Ryman Program for Young Artists honors Herb Ryman, an artist, designer and fellow Disney Legend.

Sklar won a Lifetime Achievement Award from the Themed Entertainment Association (TEA) in 1995, and has been inducted into the International Association of Amusement Parks and Attractions (IAAPA) Hall of Fame.

In 2016, Sklar was awarded the Diane Disney Miller Lifetime Achievement Award from The Walt Disney Family Museum.

Prior to his death, Sklar was interviewed for Leslie Iwerks' limited docu-series The Imagineering Story, which premiered November 12, 2019 upon the launch of the streaming service Disney+. It was dedicated to Sklar's memory.

== Personal life and death ==
Sklar was married and had a family, including his brother Robert Sklar. He was involved with Ryman Arts, an organization supporting young artists. Sklar died on July 27, 2017, at his home in Hollywood Hills, California, at the age of 83.
