= Her Night of Nights =

1922 film

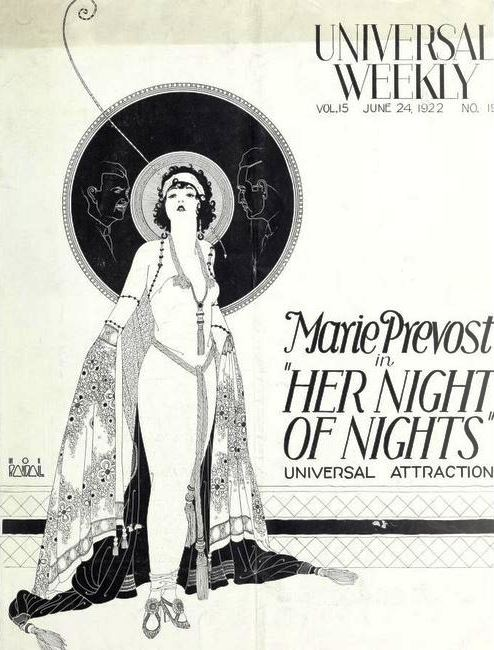
- Advertisement
- Directed by: Hobart Henley
- Screenplay by: Doris Schroeder
- Based on: Her Night of Nights by C. S. Montayne
- Starring: Marie Prevost; Edward Hearn; Hallam Cooley; Betty Francisco; Charles Arling; Jane Starr
- Cinematography: Victor Milner
- Production company: Universal Film Manufacturing Company
- Distributed by: Universal Film Manufacturing Company
- Release date: June 26, 1922
- Running time: 50 minutes
- Country: United States
- Language: Silent (English intertitles)

Her Night of Nights is a 1922 American silent comedy film directed by Hobart Henley and written by Doris Schroeder. The film stars Marie Prevost, Edward Hearn, Hallam Cooley, Betty Francisco, Charles Arling, and Jane Starr. The film was released on June 26, 1922, by Universal Film Manufacturing Company.

== Cast ==
- Marie Prevost as Molly May Mahone
- Edward Hearn as Jerry Trimble
- Hallam Cooley as Ted Bradley
- Betty Francisco as Myone Madrigal
- Charles Arling as Cyrus Bradley
- Jane Starr as Lily Everson
- George B. Williams as Gus Wimple
- William Robert Daly as Pop Mahone
- Richard Daniels as Micky Dennis Mahone
