= Wild West Days =

- Poster advertising the fourth installment
- Directed by: Ford Beebe; Clifford Smith
- Written by: Wyndham Gittens; Norman S. Hall; Ray Trampe; W. R. Burnett (novel)
- Produced by: Ben Koenig; Henry MacRae
- Starring: Johnny Mack Brown; George Shelley; Lynn Gilbert; Frank Yaconelli; Bob Kortman; Russell Simpson; Walter Miller
- Cinematography: Richard Fryer
- Edited by: Saul A. Goodkind; Louis Sackin; Alvin Todd
- Music by: Charles Previn
- Production company: Universal Pictures
- Distributed by: Universal Pictures
- Release date: July 5, 1937
- Running time: 268 minutes (13 episodes)
- Country: United States
- Language: English

Wild West Days (1937) is a Universal film serial based on a Western novel by W. R. Burnett. Directed by Ford Beebe and Clifford Smith and starring Johnny Mack Brown, George Shelley, Lynn Gilbert, Frank Yaconelli, Bob Kortman, Russell Simpson, and Walter Miller, it was the 103rd of the studio's 137 serials (and the 35th with sound), and was the first of three serials Brown made for the studio before being promoted to his own B-western series in 1939.

== Premise ==
Larry and Lucy Munro own a ranch with a rich platinum deposit. Newspaper editor Matt Keeler as the head of a gang called "Secret Seven" wants the ranch for himself and has Larry framed for murder to get it. Frontiersman Kentucky Wade - with his pals Dude Hanford, Mike Morales and Trigger Benton - come to the Munros' aid.

== Cast ==
- Johnny Mack Brown as Kentucky Wade (as John Mack Brown)
- George Shelley as Dude Hanford
- Lynn Gilbert as Lucy Munro
- Frank Yaconelli as Mike Morales
- Bob Kortman as Trigger Benton (as Robert Kortman)
- Russell Simpson as Matt Keeler
- Walter Miller as Doc Hardy
- Charles Stevens as Buckskin Frank
- Frank McGlynn Jr. as Larry Munro (as Frank McGlynn)
- Francis McDonald as Assayer Purvis
- Al Bridge as Steve Claggett
- Chief Thunderbird as Chief Red Hatchet
- Robert McClung as Mouth Organ Kid [Chs. 8-11]
- Edward LeSaint as Sheriff (as Ed LeSaint)
- Joseph W. Girard as Judge Lawrence
- Jack Rube Clifford as Corey (as Jack Clifford)
- William Royle as Braden
- Bruce Mitchell as Rancher Tobe Driscoll
- Miki Morita as Chan, 2nd Cook [Chs. 7, 9, 11-12]

== Production ==
This serial was based on the novel "Saint Johnson" by William R. Burnett. However, the main character in the serial is a frontiersman called Kentucky Wade instead of Wayt Johnson as in the novel.

== Chapter titles ==
1. Death Rides the Range
2. The Redskins' Revenge
3. The Brink of Doom
4. The Indians Are Coming
5. The Leap for Life
6. Death Stalks the Plains
7. Six Gun Law
8. The Gold Stampede
9. Walls of Fire
10. The Circle of Doom
11. The Thundering Herd
12. Rustlers and Redskins
13. The Rustlers' Roundup

_{Source:}

== See also ==
- List of film serials
- List of film serials by studio

Preceded by Secret Agent X-9 (1936)	Universal Serial; Wild West Days (1937)	Succeeded by Radio Patrol (1937)
