= Madelon Mason =

American former model (1925–2011)

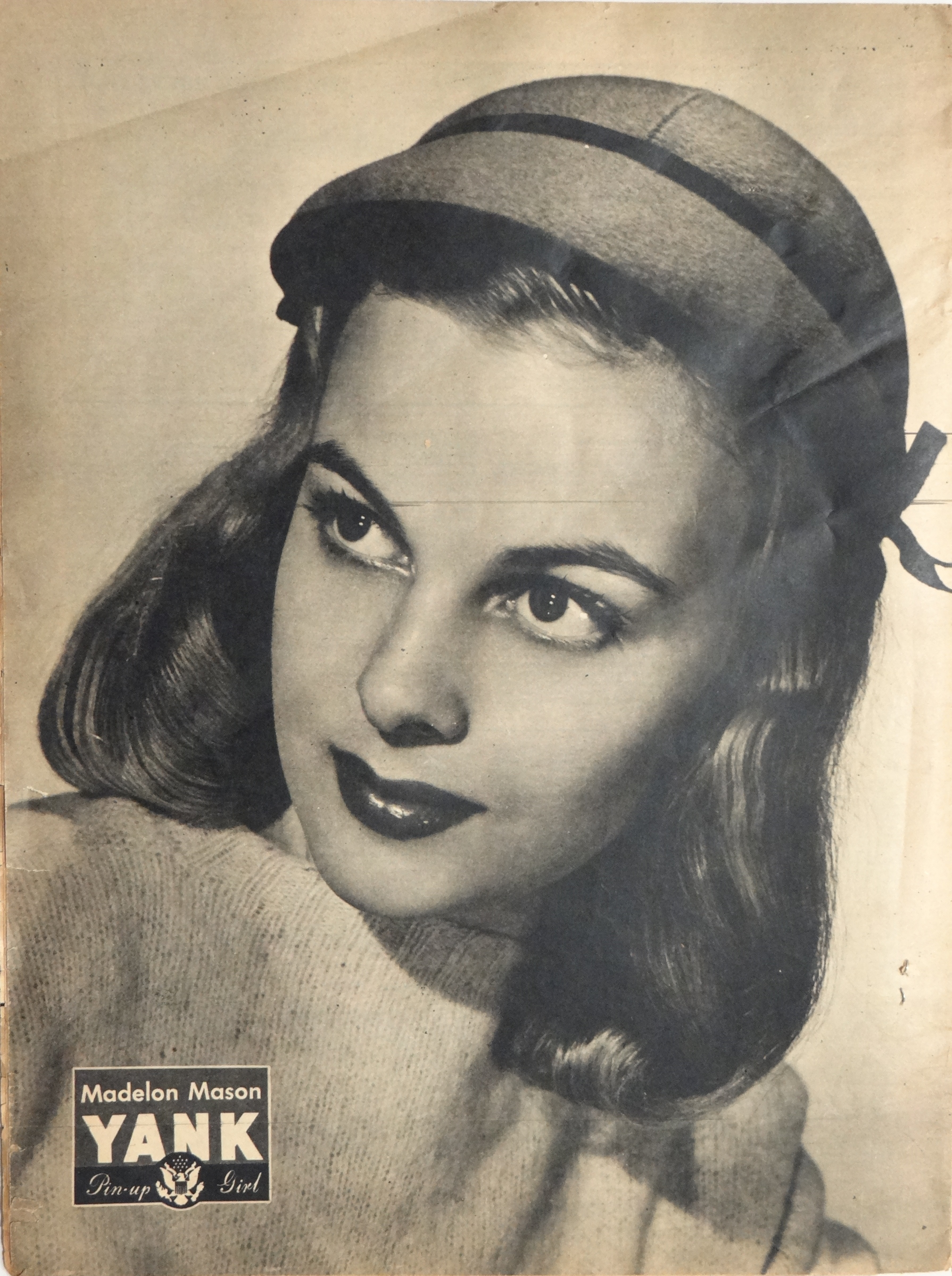
- Mason from Yank, June 1945
- Born: Madelon Samandl; July 4, 1921; Cleveland, Ohio
- Died: September 14, 2011 (aged 90); New York City, New York, U.S.
- Occupation: Model
- Spouse: Francis Foster
- Modeling information
- Height: 5 ft 4 in (163 cm)

Madelon Mason (Born Madelon Samandl, July 4, 1921 - September 14, 2011) was an American former model and pin-up girl from the early 1940s to the early 1950s.

== Biography ==
Madelon was born in 1921 to Jerry Samandl and Virginia (Conway) Samandl in Cleveland, Ohio. Her father was the son of Czech immigrants, and her mother was of English and Irish descent.

Madelon was educated in Boston, Massachusetts. She was modeling in Boston in 1942, then moved to New York to pursue a career in modeling.

Mason was featured on the cover of the first issue of Seventeen magazine in 1944. In May 1945, she appeared in a photograph posing with the makings of an M-69 incendiary bomb of the type being used in Japan. In June 1945, she was the pin-up girl in Yank, the Army Weekly. In late 1945 and early 1946, newspapers dubbed her "America's Cover Girl" for 1946.

She refused movie offers. However, Madelon appeared in the short film with Gloria Swanson titled Dear Miss Gloria.

In March 1947, Mason was featured on the cover of Life magazine, posing in a hat in front of Monet's painting, The Water Lilies. She also appeared in advertising for the soft drink, Dr. Pepper.

In 1951 Madelon was chosen as one of the five "Overall Beauties of the Decade" by The International Artists Committee.

Mason was still active in modeling in the early 1950s. She was a model on the CBS television game show The $64,000 Question. The show aired from 1955 to 1958.

She married Francis Foster in her mid-thirties.

Madelon Mason died September 14, 2011, in New York, New York.

== See also ==
- Pin-ups of Yank, the Army Weekly
