= Marjorie Benton Cooke =

American monologist, playwright, novelist

Marjorie Benton Cooke (November 27, 1876 – April 26, 1920) was an American monologist, playwright, and novelist. A specialist in comic dramatic sketches and light romantic fiction, she also wrote and performed monologues on suffragist issues.

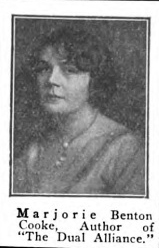
From The Publishers' Weekly, September 25, 1915

== Life and career ==
She was born in Richmond, Indiana to Joseph Henry Cooke and Jessie Benton Cooke and attended the University of Chicago, graduating with a Bachelor of Philosophy degree in 1899. She began working as a journalist soon after and by 1902 was touring the United States as a monologist. Several of her monologues and one-act plays were published in booklets and collected form. Her first novel, The Girl Who Lived in the Woods, was published by A. C. McClurg & Co. in 1910 and, like many of her future works, concerned the overcoming of conflicts between an unorthodox romantic couple.

Benton Cooke's most well-known work was the novel Bambi. Initially serialized in the American Magazine from April to October 1914 and published in the same year by Doubleday, Page & Co., it is the story of a young woman who impulsively marries an idealistic but impractical writer and becomes a novelist and playwright herself. Its humor and witty dialogue quickly made it a readers' favorite and commercial success, with the first edition selling out two weeks before publication. Bambi was followed by other novels including Cinderella Jane (1917) and The Threshold (1918), which both explore women's work, class, and the relations between the sexes.

== Activism ==
As an active supporter of the feminist politics of her time, Benton Cooke performed suffrage monologues at over a hundred gatherings including the National American Woman Suffrage Association’s 1912 convention in Louisville, Kentucky. She was a member of literary associations like the Little Room Club in Chicago and the Authors League, as well as of women's clubs like the Women's University Club and the feminist debating and activist group Heterodoxy, both located in New York City. She was an editor and contributing writer for Four Lights, the journal of the New York City chapter of the Women's Peace Party. In 1916 she contributed a chapter to The Sturdy Oak, a round-robin novel that narrates the conversion of an anti-suffragist into a suffragist reformer. Other contributors included Dorothy Canfield Fisher and Fannie Hurst, and the book's proceeds went to the suffrage cause.

== Death ==
On April 26, 1920, Benton Cooke's death was announced via cablegram from Manila, where she had arrived a few days previously on a world cruise with her mother. Her novel Married? was published posthumously and was one of at least four of her works adapted into a silent film. Her estate was estimated at $42,358 in 1922 and included $17,100 in film rights.

== Bibliography ==
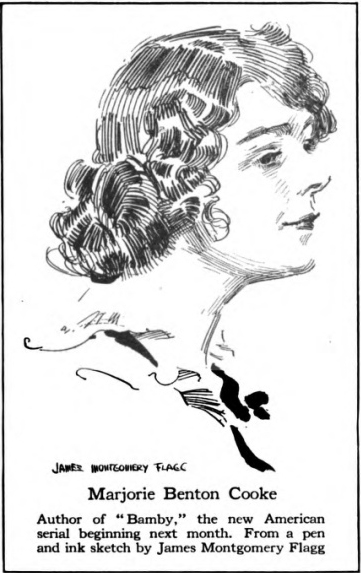
From The American Magazine, March 1914

=== Novels ===
- The Girl Who Lived in the Woods (1910)
- Dr. David (1911)
- The Redemption of Anthony (1911)
- Bambi (1914)
- The Dual Alliance (1915)
- The Incubus (1915)
- Cinderella Jane (1917)
- The Sturdy Oak: A Composite Novel of American Politics (1917)
- The Clutch of Circumstance (1918)
- The Threshold (1919)
- The Cricket (1919)
- Married? (1921)

=== Drama ===
- Modern Monologues (1903)
- Dramatic Episodes (1904)
- Plays for Children (1905)
- When Knights Were Bold: An Incident of King Arthur's Court (1906)
- More Modern Monologues (1907)

=== Poetry ===
- To Mother (1911)

=== Cinematic adaptations ===
- Her Husband's Friend (1920, from The Incubus)
- The Little 'Fraid Lady (1920, from The Girl Who Lived in the Woods)
- The Mad Marriage (1921, from Cinderella Jane)
- Married? (1926)
