= Chief Thunderbird =

American actor

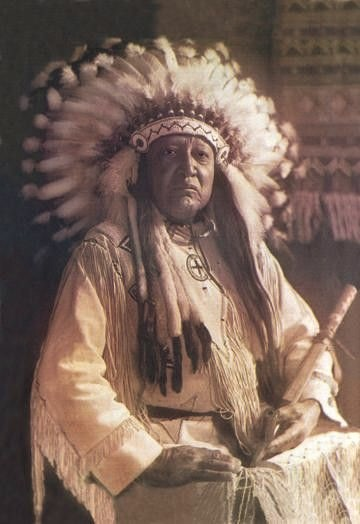
- Chief Thunderbird in 1931 publicity still from Battling with Buffalo Bill
- Born: Richard Davis Thunderbird; August 6, 1866; Tongue River, Montana Territory, U.S.
- Died: April 6, 1946 (aged 79); Los Angeles County, California, U.S.
- Education: Carlisle Indian School
- Occupation: Actor
- Years active: 1914–1944

Richard Davis Thunderbird (August 6, 1866 – April 6, 1946) was a Native American actor of Cheyenne descent known as Chief Thunderbird. He appeared in twenty films but was credited only in major films such as Wild West Days (1937), For the Service (1936), Silly Billies (1936), Custer's Last Stand (1936), Annie Oakley (1935), Cyclone of the Saddle (1935), Laughing Boy (1934), and Heroes of the West (1932).

== Career ==
Thunderbird was born on August 6, 1866, near Tongue River, Montana Territory, and attended the Carlisle Indian School.

Thunderbird made his first appearance in a film in 1914. He played an Indian (an uncredited role) in the film The Perils of Pauline. Thunderbird got his first credited role in the movie Battling with Buffalo Bill (1931), wherein he played Chief Thunder Bird. His next credited role (also as Chief Thunder Bird) was in Heroes of the West (1932). The protagonists of the film included Noah Beery Jr. as Noah Blaine, Julie Bishop as Ann Blaine, Onslow Stevens as Tom Crosby, and William Desmond as John Blaine. The film is a classic western film in which the hero fights off crooks and Indians for the railroad.

Thunderbird got his first big role in his next film, Laughing Boy (1934), wherein he played Laughing Boy's Father. The film itself was a controversial one, revolving around Ramon Novarro's character, Laughing Boy, who falls in love with Lupe Velez's character, Slim Girl. Laughing Boy's family, of Navajo descent, disapprove of their son's decision to marry a white man's mistress.

The next film in which Thunderbird was credited (as Chick Davis) was Cyclone of the Saddle (1935), wherein he played High Hawk. In this movie, Rex Lease's character, Andy Thomas, is in charge of finding out who is harassing the wagon trains. Thunderbird, however, did not have much of a commanding role in this film.

Later in 1935, Thunderbird was showcased in his most notable film, Annie Oakley (1935). The film, called a "western", takes place in Cincinnati. Thunderbird plays the character of Chief Sitting Bull (1831–1890), a Native American of Sioux descent.

Thunderbird next appeared (again credited as Chick Davis) in Custer's Last Stand (1936) as Rain-in-Face; his role, however, was very minimal. The film itself is about how villains (the Indians) were attacking white men. Blade, the main protagonist, steals an Indian medicine arrow. When asked to exchange the arrow for gold, Blade decides to start killing the Indians. Although it is an abysmal role for Thunderbird, it is important to understand the representation of the Native Americans in these films at this time.

Thunderbird made his next appearance in 1936 in the film Silly Billies, wherein he played Chief Cyclone. The two main characters travel to the west to open up a new dentist practice and find themselves saving the day against the hostile Indians.

Thunderbird made another appearance in 1936 in the film For the Service, wherein he played Chief Big Bear. In this film, the main characters, Buck Jones (Buck O'Bryan) and Captain Murphy (Edward Keane), send their troops to go after the outlaw gang, composed of whites and Indian renegades. This film portrays Indians as killers, thieves, and less-than-intelligent human beings.

Thunderbird's last credited film role was as Chief Red Hatchet in Wild West Days (1937). Like most westerns of the time, Thunderbird played a villain, plotting alongside the Secret Seven to take over the Munro Ranch.

Thunderbird made his last appearance in 1944 in the film The Falcon Out West, wherein he played Eagle Feather. He died two years later on April 6, 1946, in Los Angeles County, California, at the age of 79.

Thunderbird acted in twenty films but was never cast in a lead or supporting role, although Native American performers such as Chief Yowlachie, Will Rogers, and Ray Mala did portray prominent screen characters. During his era, Indians were portrayed in a variety of roles as both sympathetic and hostile.

== Filmography ==
Year	Title	Role	Notes
1914	The Perils of Pauline	Indian	Film debut, Uncredited
1923	The Covered Wagon	Indian	Uncredited
1930	The Indians Are Coming	Chief Yellow Snake	Serial, Uncredited
1931	Battling with Buffalo Bill	Chief Thunder Bird	Serial
1932	Heroes of the West	Chief Thunder Bird	Serial
1934	Massacre	Indian	Uncredited
1934	Laughing Boy	Laughing Boy's Father	
1935	Rustlers of Red Dog	Indian Chief	Serial, Uncredited
1935	Cyclone of the Saddle	High Hawk	
1935	Annie Oakley	Chief Sitting Bull	
1936	Custer's Last Stand	Rain-in-Face	Serial
1936	Silly Billies	Chief Cyclone	
1936	The Country Beyond	Indian	Uncredited
1936	For the Service	Chief Big Bear	
1937	Wild West Days	Chief Red Hatchet	Serial
1939	Susannah of the Mounties	Indian	Uncredited
1939	Geronimo	Chief Eskiminzu	Uncredited
1940	North West Mounted Police	Indian	Uncredited
1942	Wild Bill Hickok Rides	Indian	Uncredited
1944	The Falcon Out West	Eagle Feather	Final film, Uncredited
