= Lucille Carroll =

American actress (1906–2002)

- Born: Garnett Lucille Ryman; June 10, 1906; Macon County, Illinois, U.S.
- Died: October 23, 2002 (aged 96); Glendale, California, U.S.
- Education: Millikin University
- Occupation: Actress
- Spouse: John Carroll (m. 1947; died 1979)
- Relatives: Herbert Ryman (brother)

Garnett Lucille Ryman Carroll, stage name Jane Starr (born Garnett Lucille Ryman; June 10, 1906 – October 23, 2002) was an American Broadway actress and the first female studio executive in Hollywood.

== Early life ==
Garnett Lucille Ryman was born in Macon County, Illinois, to Dr. Herbert D. Ryman and Cora Ryman. while he was at Kansas State Medical College. He died in France while a field surgeon during World War I when Carroll was 12 years old.

Carroll graduated from Decatur High School in Decatur, Illinois, and in 1926 she graduated from Millikin University, where she was a member of the Delta Delta Delta sorority and acted in plays. During the following five years, she taught at Assumption High School and Roosevelt Junior High, acting in plays staged by Decatur's Town and Gown Players, a community theater company.

Carroll quit her teaching job "to go adventuring into the land of the theater". Moving to California, she studied acting at the Pasadena Playhouse, doing well enough in its summer session that she received a $1,000 scholarship (free tuition) for the winter session.

Carroll's brother, Herbert Ryman was an artist for MGM and the Walt Disney Company. She also had a sister, Christine.

== Career ==
Using the stage name Jane Starr, she worked with movie producer Louis O. Macloon at the 1933 Chicago World's Fair, demonstrating how motion pictures were made. Macloon, who had recently given an actor named Clark Gable some of his first parts, chose her to star in the Broadway play It Pays to Sin.

When the play received scathing reviews and closed, Carroll sought consolation by visiting backstage with Katharine Hepburn, who had also received terrible reviews while acting in a nearby theater. Hepburn was characteristically blunt. "Then you're not an actress", Hepburn told Carroll. "I don't care what the critics say about me. I know what I am."

Carroll moved to San Francisco, where she and Macloon opened an experimental theater and produced several plays. She married Macloon in 1936. They divorced within a few years. During the 1930s, she traveled throughout the nation as talent scout for Universal Pictures, rising to become head of that studio's talent department in New York.

Carroll headed Metro-Goldwyn-Mayer's talent department from 1941 to 1954 and helped sign a young actress named Lana Turner, helped arrange a key screen test for Marilyn Monroe and played a role in bringing June Allyson and Janet Leigh to MGM. She was one of the first women to reach a position of executive power in the old Hollywood studio system.

At MGM, she met John Carroll, a successful actor who had appeared in movies such as Flying Tigers with John Wayne and Go West with the Marx Brothers. They were married in 1947. He died in 1979. Movies made at MGM while Lucille Carroll ran its training department included Singin' in the Rain, Show Boat, Gaslight and Meet Me in St. Louis.

While she was there, MGM garnered 16 Academy Award nominations for best picture, winning Oscars for An American in Paris and Mrs. Miniver. In 1942, Hepburn signed a contract with MGM to appear in a picture, Woman of the Year, the first of many in which she appeared with Spencer Tracy. One of Carroll's roles at MGM was as an advisor to established stars such as Hepburn, Tracy, Judy Garland, Mickey Rooney and Greer Garson. She smoothed over differences that arose between the stars and the studio's business executives.

In later years, Carroll resided in Burbank with her brother. After Herb's death, she produced a collection of his great works and many Disney conceptual works, that later became reality, as the hallmark of the Disney Theme Parks. She also co-founded the Ryman-Carroll Foundation as a tribute to her brother and to honor his lifelong dedication to mentoring young artists.

== Personal life and death ==
As Jane Starr, Carroll married Lieutenant Commander Charles Bellamy Carpenter, Jr., on December 24, 1945, in Las Vegas, Nevada.

In 1947 she married John Carroll (actor) until his death in 1979.

She died in her Glendale home at the age of 96 on October 23, 2002.

== Partial filmography ==
- Danger Ahead (1921)
- The Mad Marriage (1921)
- Bobbed Hair (1922)
- Her Night of Nights (1922)
- The Fighting American (1924)
- The Whispered Name (1924)
- Manhattan Madness (1925)

== Sources ==
- Worldstream, AP (November 2, 2002). "Lucille Carroll, woman who broke into old Hollywood to lead MGM talent department". AP Worldstream. Archived from the original on May 16, 2011 – via HighBeam Research.
