= The Mad Marriage (1921 film) =

American silent drama film (1921)

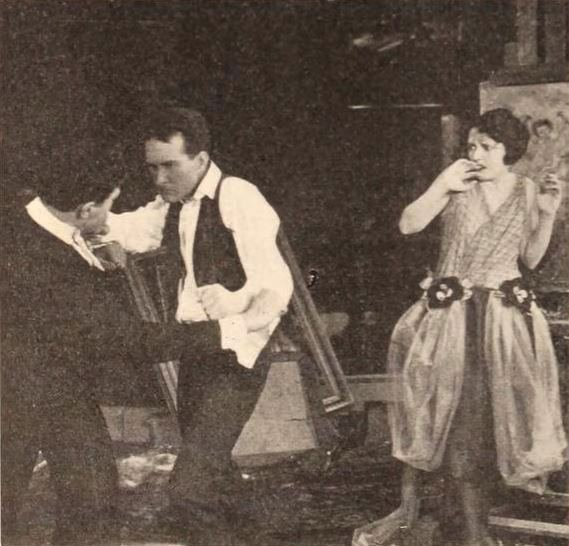
- Still from the film
- Directed by: Rollin S. Sturgeon
- Written by: Marion Fairfax
- Based on: Cinderella Jane by Marjorie Benton Cooke
- Produced by: Carl Laemmle
- Starring: Carmel Myers
- Cinematography: Alfred Gosden
- Production company: Universal Film Manufacturing Company
- Distributed by: Universal Film Manufacturing Company
- Release date: January 31, 1921 (U.S.)
- Running time: 5 reels
- Country: United States
- Language: Silent (English intertitles)

The Mad Marriage is a 1921 American silent drama film directed by Rollin S. Sturgeon and starring Carmel Myers. The film was produced and distributed by the Universal Film Manufacturing Company. It is currently classified as a lost.

== Cast ==
- Carmel Myers as Jane Judd
- Truman Van Dyke as Jerry Paxton
- William Brunton as Willie
- Virginia Ware as Mrs. Brendon
- Maragaret Cullington as Harmonia
- Jane Starr as Althea
- Arthur Edmund Carewe as Christiansen
- Nola Luxford as Bob
- Lydia Yeamans Titus as Mrs. Boggs
