= Bobbed Hair (1922 film) =

1922 film by Thomas N. Heffron

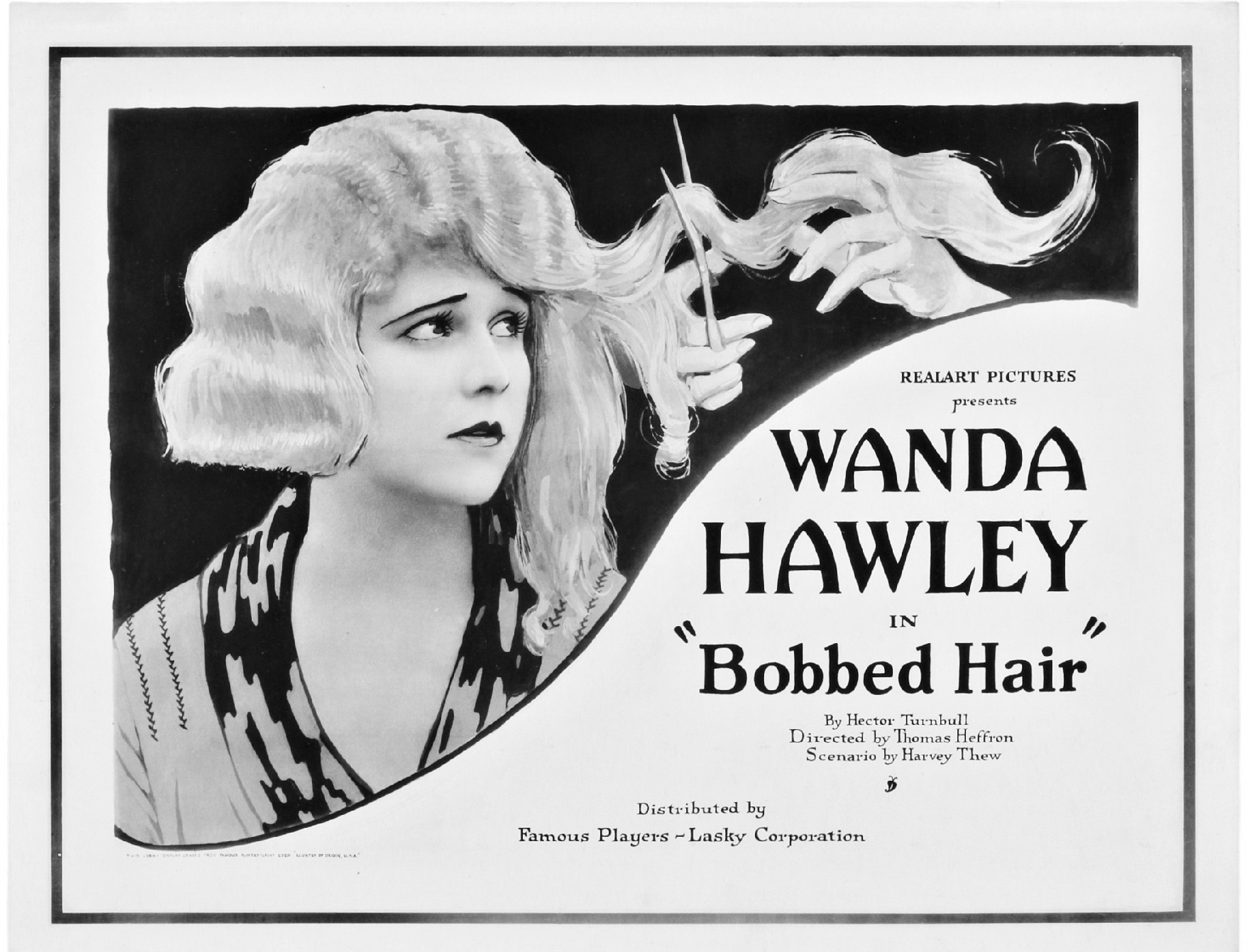
- Lobby card
- Directed by: Thomas N. Heffron
- Screenplay by: Harvey F. Thew
- Story by: Hector Turnbull
- Starring: Wanda Hawley; William Boyd; Adele Farrington; Leigh Wyant; Jane Starr; Margaret Vilmore
- Cinematography: William E. Collins
- Production company: Realart Pictures Corporation
- Distributed by: Famous Players–Lasky Corporation
- Release date: March 12, 1922
- Running time: 50 minutes
- Country: United States
- Language: Silent (English intertitles)

Bobbed Hair is a 1922 American romance film directed by Thomas N. Heffron and written by Harvey F. Thew. The film stars Wanda Hawley, William Boyd, Adele Farrington, Leigh Wyant, Jane Starr, and Margaret Vilmore. The film was released on March 12, 1922, by Famous Players–Lasky Corporation.

== Plot ==
As described in a film magazine, Polly Heath, a romantic young woman, runs away from home when her approved suitor, Dick Barton, dwells too consistently upon material considerations like money and diamonds. She takes up abode with an old school chum in a new thought colony and bobs her hair and dons Grecian vestments. Her suitor follows her and rescues her from ultra modern poet Paul Lamont who has engineered a compromising situation, whereupon she sees his proffered solitaire in a new light and forswears romance and futurism indefinitely.

== Cast ==
- Wanda Hawley as Polly Heath
- William Boyd as Dick Barton
- Adele Farrington as Aunt Emily
- Leigh Wyant as Zoe Dean
- Jane Starr as Evelyn
- Margaret Vilmore as Daisy
- William P. Carleton as Paul Lamont
- Ethel Wales as Mrs. Lamont
- Junior Coghlan as Lamont Child
- Robert Kelly as Lamont Child
