= Lillian Albertson =

Actress, theatrical producer

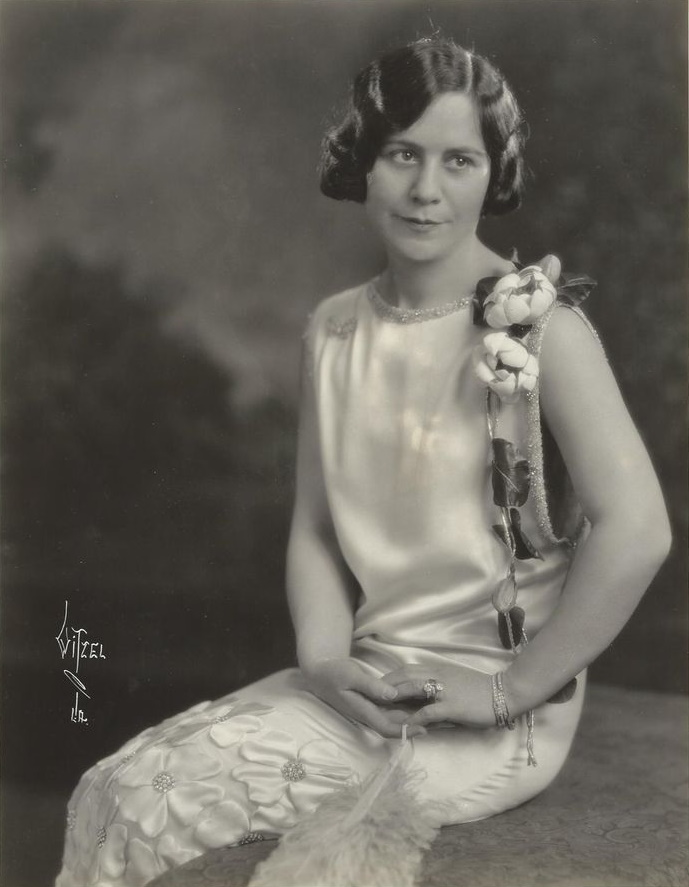
- Albertson, c. 1922
- Born: August 6, 1881; Noblesville, Indiana, U.S.
- Died: August 24, 1962 (aged 81); Los Angeles, California, U.S.
- Occupations: Actress, theatre producer
- Spouses: Abraham Levy; (m. 1908; div. after April 1921) Louis Macloon (m. 1923; div. 1933)

Lillian Albertson (August 6, 1881 – August 24, 1962) was an American stage and screen actress, and a noted theatrical producer. Born in Noblesville, Indiana and raised in Fresno, California, she trained as an actress in San Francisco where she made her stage debut in 1902. She was a highly regarded stage actress in both New York and California over the next 20 years. She starred in many Broadway productions from 1904 through 1922. She later was active as theatrical producer and an acting coach. She made a few film appearances in small parts in the 1940s.

== Early life ==
Lillian Albertson was born in Noblesville, Indiana on August 6, 1881. She moved to California as a child. She grew up in Fresno, and was educated in public schools in that city and in Hanford, California. An 1897 publication stated she was a member of Fresno High School's class of 1900 and was currently a student there. She was 19 years old when she decided that she wanted to be an actress, and trained in that profession in San Francisco.

== Acting ==
Albertson's acting debut came in 1902 at the Grand Opera House in San Francisco, performing in productions of that theater's stock company. One of her early roles in San Francisco was the part of Agnes Ralston in Charles Lawrence Young's Jim the Penman based on the life of master criminal and forger James Townshend Saward. In 1903 she was a leading actress in Harry Corson Clarke's theater troupe with whom she first appeared at the Theatre Republic in San Francisco in January of that year. She toured with this troupe as Cissy in the play What Happened to Jones to Seattle among other stops in the Pacific Northwest.

In 1904 Albertson toured to the eastern United States in a theatre troup headed by Ralph Stuart. She made her Broadway debut with this organization at the American Theatre on January 18, 1904, as Olga Petrovitch in By Right of Sword which was based on the novel of that name by Arthur W. Marchmont. She returned home to California in 1905 where she starred in a production of William Gill's Old Jed Prouty. By October 1905 she was back in New York starring as Thora in a production of Hall Caine's The Prodigal Son.

On August 22, 1908, Albertson married her first husband, Abraham Levy, with whom she had a son. Levy was a theatrical producer who was a partner of A. H. Woods and a partial owner of the Eltinge Theatre on Broadway. Albertson continued to work on the stage after her marriage, but with less frequency. Some of her other Broadway credits include The Silver Girl (1907) Paid in Full (1908), The Talker (1912), Moloch (1915), The Devil's Garden (1915), The Six-Fifty (1921), and Malvaloca (1922). She was still married to her first husband as late as April 1921, but the marriage ended in divorce.

== Producing and coaching ==
After acting for two decades, Albertson married her second husband, theatrical producer Louis Macloon, on April 17, 1923, in Manhattan. They left New York and back to California with plans for Lillian to be a producer. During their marriage Louis and Lillian worked together producing projects. The couple were credited with discovering future film star Clark Gable.

Lillian bought rights to plays that were then popular in the eastern United States and produced them in the West. Her successes included Hit the Deck; Lady Be Good; No, No, Nanette; and The Desert Song. Economic effects of the Great Depression ended the string of successful productions. Ultimately Lillian's marriage to Macloon was not happy, and, having no children, they divorced in 1933 after ten years of marriage.

In the 1940s, Albertson worked for both Paramount and RKO Pictures as a drama coach, and she wrote a book, Motion Picture Acting. She also evaluated prospective actors to determine which ones deserved to have screen tests. She was appointed head of the talent coaching department at RKO Radio in 1943.

== Death ==
On August 24, 1962, Albertson died at her home in Los Angeles, California. She was 81.

== Filmography ==
Year	Title	Role	Notes	References
1951	Storm Warning	Mrs. Rainey	Uncredited	
1951	The Blue Veil	Mrs. Lipscott	Uncredited	
1952	The Greatest Show on Earth	Buttons' Mother		
1956	The Ten Commandments	Slave	Uncredited, (final film role)	
