= Ryman Arts =

Nonprofit organization in Los Angeles

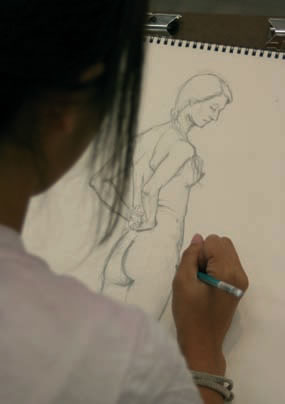
A Ryman Arts student drawing a live model in 2007

Ryman Arts is a nonprofit fine arts education organization that is based in Los Angeles, California. Ryman Arts was co-founded in 1990 as the Ryman-Carroll Foundation by Leah and Martin Sklar, Ann and Buzz Price, Walt Disney's daughter Sharon Disney Lund, and Lucille Ryman Carroll, to honor Herbert Ryman. The organization provides free art classes in drawing and painting with master teachers to Los Angeles area high school students. It began with 12 students and by 2007 the program had expanded to include roughly 300 students from 80 Los Angeles-area high schools. Classes are held on Sundays at the Otis College of Art and Design and on Saturdays at Cal-State Fullerton. There are classes in the mornings and afternoons, each lasting 3.5 hours. The courses offered are Beginning Drawing, Intermediate Drawing with intro. to Watercolor painting, and Advanced Painting. The organization is supported by the National Endowment for the Arts.
