= Herbert Ryman =

American artist and Walt Disney Imagineer

- Born: Herbert Dickens Ryman Jr. June 28, 1910; Vernon, Illinois, U.S.
- Died: February 10, 1989 (aged 78); Los Angeles, California, U.S.
- Resting place: Cremated, ashes scattered at sea off the coast of Carmel, CA
- Education: Millikin University; Art Institute of Chicago
- Known for: Disney artist and imagineer
- Notable work: The First Disneyland schematic Sleeping Beauty Castle; Cinderella Castle
- Awards: Disney Legends - 1990
- Memorials: Ryman Arts

Herbert Dickens Ryman Jr. (June 28, 1910 – February 10, 1989) was an American artist and Disney Imagineer. Ryman worked in watercolor, oils, and pen & ink sketches. In 1953 Ryman drew the first illustrations of Walt Disney's vision of a theme park that eventually became Disneyland.

== Early years and education ==
Ryman was born on June 28, 1910, in Vernon, Illinois, son of Dr. Herbert D. Ryman (1878–1918) and Cora Belle Ryman (née Norris, 1876–1963). His family moved to Decatur, IL when he was age 9. While attending Millikin University, he became deathly ill with scarlet fever. His mother was opposed to his artistic ambitions and wanted him to pursue a medical degree. But as his sickness worsened, she told him that he could attend the School of the Art Institute of Chicago. He graduated cum laude in 1932 from the Art Institute of Chicago.

== Career ==
In 1932 Ryman moved to California, where he found a job as a storyboard illustrator in the art department of Cedric Gibbons at Metro-Golden-Mayer Studios. For a period, during Hollywood's "golden age", he was the sole artist and illustrator for MGM Studios. He helped design many major pictures for Metro-Goldwyn-Mayer and 20th Century Fox including the screen styling of David Copperfield, A Tale of Two Cities, Mutiny on the Bounty, and Anna Karenina. His work on The Good Earth project inspired him to leave his job at MGM and tour China where he made many sketches. His last work at MGM was the Emerald City segment of The Wizard of Oz.

In 1938 he returned to California, where he met Walt Disney as a result of an exhibit of Ryman's works at the Chouinard Art Institute. Walt was so impressed with the paintings that he invited Herb to join the Walt Disney Studios (Burbank). Herb went on to serve as an art director for such feature-length animated films as Fantasia and Dumbo.

In the late summer of 1941, Ryman toured with Walt Disney, other Disney Studio artists, and management personnel on a three-month "Good Will Tour of South America", through an invitation from Nelson Rockefeller, Coordinator of Inter-American Affairs. The tour was part of an Allied effort to maintain solid relations with southern countries in the Western Hemisphere. They traveled by aircraft and regional railway systems connecting the countries of Brazil, Bolivia, Guatemala, Peru, Ecuador, Argentina, and Mexico. Production of the two Disney films Saludos Amigos and The Three Caballeros, resulted from this trip.

Ryman had become acquainted with author Margaret Landon during his travels in Asia. After the end of World War II, when he heard that 20th Century Fox was developing a film based on Landon's 1944 novel Anna and the King of Siam, he informed Disney that he was leaving Walt Disney Productions to work on the 20th Century Fox film. At Fox, Ryman also worked on several other pictures, including Forever Amber, Down to the Sea in Ships, David and Bathsheba, The Black Rose, and The Robe.

During the summers of 1949 and 1951, Ryman took a leave of absence from 20th Century Fox and travelled with the Ringling Bros. and Barnum & Bailey Circus. Living among the performers and documenting the circus in his paintings, he became friends with Emmett Kelly.

In 1955 Doubleday published The Tontine, a two volume novel written by Thomas B. Costain and illustrated by Ryman. Set in nineteenth-century England, the story centers around the fictional "Waterloo" tontine, established to benefit veterans of the Napoleonic wars. Among other plot twists, shareholders hire an actor to impersonate a dead nominee, and conspire to murder another member.

After leaving the Disney organization, Ryman had remained friends with Walt Disney. On September 26, 1953, he received an urgent request to meet with Disney. Disney asked Ryman to render the artwork for a Disney envisioned theme park. Disney and Ryman worked non-stop throughout the weekend creating a large pencil sketch and several other drawings illustrating the project. Roy Disney took the drawings and a six-page portfolio to New York to show investors the plan in order to secure financing used to develop Disneyland. Once financing was assured, Disney asked Ryman to rejoin the Disney Company. Disneyland became the centerpiece of his Disney career. Among his contributions were designs for Main Street, U.S.A., Sleeping Beauty Castle and New Orleans Square. Herb also contributed concepts for the Jungle Cruise, Pirates of the Caribbean, and for attractions featured at the 1964-65 New York World's Fair, including Great Moments with Mr. Lincoln.

Ryman worked on many special projects at Disney over a five decade span. He was the chief designer of the Cinderella Castle at the Walt Disney World Resort.

Ryman officially retired from The Walt Disney Company in 1971. He returned in 1976 as a consultant on Walt Disney World, Epcot Center including renderings and concept paintings for The American Adventure, the China Pavilion, and the Meet the World attraction at Tomorrow Land at Tokyo Disneyland.

His last project at Disney was contributing concept drawings for Main Street in the planned Euro Disneyland when he became ill.

He is well known for his watercolors of the rugged California coasts around Carmel and Point Lobos, as well as for his paintings of the Ringling Brothers Circus, and portraits of Emmett Kelly and other well known people. Many of his paintings hang in Hollywood's most famed homes.

== Awards and legacy ==
Ryman was a member of the American Institute of Fine Arts, the Society of Illustrators, and the California Art Club where he was president in 1963. In 1990, Herb Ryman was inducted [posthumously] into the Disney Legends program. His sister, Lucille Carroll, co-founded the Ryman-Carroll Foundation in his memory. In 2000 the Ryman-Carroll Foundation published "A Brush with Disney" a 252-page story of Ryman's life with color illustrations by Ryman (ISBN 978-0964605961).

== Personal life ==
Ryman's ancestors came to the U.S. from Heidelberg, Germany. His father was commissioned a Captain in the Medical Corps 107th Field Artillery 28th Division and sent to the war front in France at his request. On Saturday afternoon, August 17, 1918, he was mortally wounded while ministering to a wounded comrade on the battlefield near St. Gilles, France. Refusing aid, he assisted in rendering and directing the treatment of three other soldiers. Though weakened by loss of blood, he showed utter disregard for his personal danger, refusing to accept treatment until the other wounded had been cared for. He later died at a nearby aid station. For his act of heroism he was posthumously awarded the Distinguished Service Cross. He is buried in Arlington National Cemetery.

His mother, Cora Belle Norris, was born July 6, 1876, in Pendleton County, Kentucky and was the great-granddaughter of President Zachary Taylor. After the death of her husband, Mrs. Ryman moved Herbert and his two sisters Lucille and Christine to Decatur, where she resumed her teaching career. She later was elected superintendent of the Macon County Schools, where she served for 16 years. She retired in 1938 and moved to California to live with her son, Herbert. She died in Los Angeles, California, on January 9, 1963, and is buried in Arlington National Cemetery.

Ryman lived for many years on Chandler Blvd in Van Nuys, California. He later moved to Sherman Oaks, California, where he died of cancer on February 10, 1989., 16 days after the death of his oldest sister Christine Pensinger (1903-1989).

== Filmography ==
=== Metro-Goldwyn-Mayer ===
- David Copperfield, storyboard
- Mutiny on the Bounty, storyboard
- Anna Karenina, storyboard
- A Tale of Two Cities, storyboard
- The Good Earth, storyboard

=== Walt Disney Productions ===
- Fantasia, Art Director - Pastoral Symphony sequence
- Dumbo, Art Director
- Saludos Amigos, Art supervision
- The Three Caballeros, Layout artist

=== Twentieth Century Fox ===
- Anna and the King of Siam
- Forever Amber
- Down to the Sea in Ships
- David and Bathsheba
- The Robe

== Disney theme park attractions ==
Herbert Ryman drew many sketches and preparatory drawings for several Disney theme parks including:

=== The original attractions at Disneyland ===
Sleeping Beauty Castle, designed by Herbie Ryman

- Sleeping Beauty Castle
- Main Street, U.S.A.
- Jungle Cruise
- Pirates of the Caribbean

=== The attractions of the 1964 New York World's Fair ===
- GE Carousel of Progress
- Great Moments with Mr. Lincoln
- It's a Small World
- Ford Magic Skyway

=== The attractions at Disney World ===
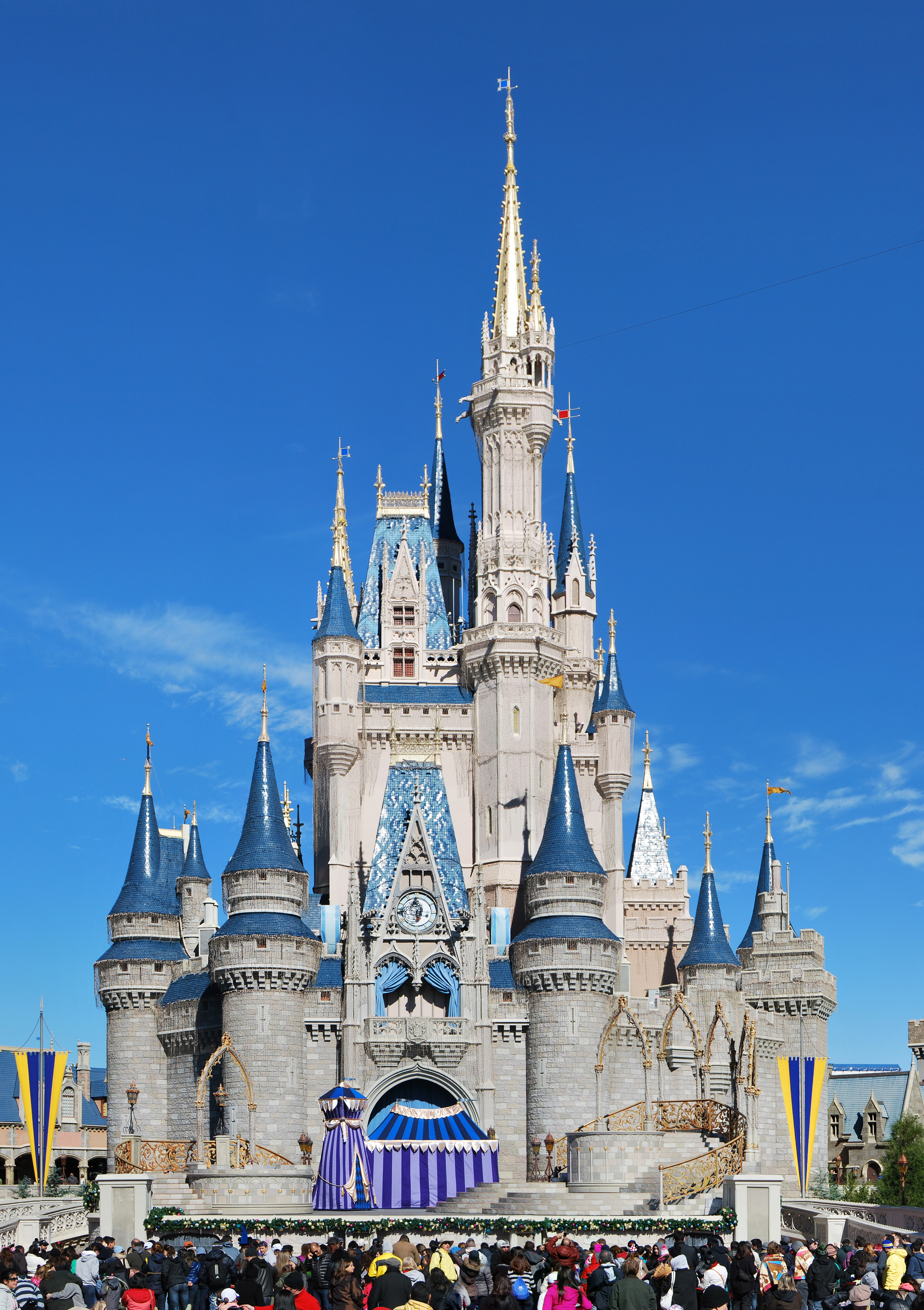
Cinderella Castle, designed by Herb Ryman

- Cinderella Castle
- Hall of Presidents

==== for EPCOT ====
- The American Adventure
- the China Pavilion of the World Showcase

=== The attractions at Tokyo Disneyland ===
- Meet the World
