= Spoilers of the Plains =

1951 film by William Witney

- Directed by: William Witney
- Written by: Sloan Nibley
- Produced by: Edward J. White
- Starring: Roy Rogers; Penny Edwards
- Cinematography: Jack A. Marta
- Edited by: Tony Martinelli
- Music by: R. Dale Butts
- Distributed by: Republic Pictures
- Release date: February 1, 1951
- Country: United States
- Language: English

Spoilers of the Plains is a 1951 American Western film directed by William Witney, and starring Roy Rogers and Penny Edwards, with Foy Willing and the Riders of the Purple Sage. The film was distributed by Republic Pictures.

== Cast ==
- Roy Rogers as Himself
- Trigger as Trigger
- Penny Edwards as Frankie Manning
- Gordon Jones as Splinters Fedders
- Grant Withers as Gregory Camwell
- Don Haggerty as Henchman Ben Rix
- Fred Kohler, Jr. as Henchman Brooks
- House Peters, Jr. as Henchman Scheller
- George Meeker as Scientist Jim
- Keith Richards as Guard Travis
- Foy Willing as Singer and Oil Co. Worker Scheller
- Riders of the Purple Sage as Singers and Oil Co. Workers

== Music ==
Foy Willing wrote the song "Happy Trails" for the film in 1951. The first three notes of the song, as well as its title, were later incorporated by Dale Evans in her version of the song for both the original The Roy Rogers Show and the short-lived The Roy Rogers and Dale Evans Show, which aired on ABC in 1962. It is the latter version that is widely known today.
