= Happy Trails (song) =

Single by Roy Rogers and Dale Evans
- Released: 1952
- Genre: Country, Western, theme song
- Label: RCA Victor
- Songwriter: Dale Evans

"Happy Trails" is a country song performed by Roy Rogers and his wife Dale Evans. It is known as the theme song for both the radio and television versions of The Roy Rogers Show, in which they also starred. It was written by Evans and performed during the outros of the shows. Evans wrote "Happy Trails" after deciding that the shows needed a outro song. Prior to the composition of "Happy Trails", the song "Smiles Are Made of Sunshine" was used, also by Rogers and Evans.

"Happy Trails" was released in 1952 as a 78 RPM and 45 RPM by Rogers and Evans with the Whippoorwills and Orchestra, on RCA Victor Records. It was re-issued in 1957 as a 45 RPM record on RCA Victor/Bluebird. Members of the Western Writers of America chose it as one of the Top 100 Western songs of all time.

In April 9, 2025, it was inducted into National Recording Registry for being "culturally, historically, and/or aesthetically significant".

== Foy Willing's version ==
In 1951, Foy Willing had written a song titled "Happy Trails" for the Republic Pictures movie, Spoilers of the Plains, starring Roy Rogers with Foy Willing and the Riders of the Purple Sage. Subsequently, the first three notes of Foy's song and the title were used by Dale Evans in writing her version of "Happy Trails" for both the original The Roy Rogers Show and the short-lived The Roy Rogers and Dale Evans Show, which aired on ABC in 1962. Dale's is the version that is popularly played and sung today, albeit without giving credit to Foy Willing.

== Cover versions ==
- On October 1, 1970, Janis Joplin left a taped recording of the song as a birthday greeting for John Lennon, three days before her death. Lennon, whose birthday was October 9, later told Dick Cavett that her taped greeting arrived at his home after her death.
- "Happy Trails" was covered by Van Halen on their 1982 album Diver Down.
- On Hollywood Squares hosted by John Davidson ended on June 16, 1989. At the end of the final episode, a video clip from the first week of shows was run, introducing the celebrities who had appeared that week. Davidson, the panelists, the audience, and the crew then sang "Happy Trails" under the credits, with the crew members sitting in the squares and holding up signs that displayed their names and titles. The song continued under a montage of audio clips from the show's run as everyone faded away and the lights gradually went out, leaving only the squares illuminated, and the credits sequence ended on a freeze frame of balloons being showered onto the stage before the final fade to black.
