= Trigger, Jr. =

1950 film by William Witney

- Film poster
- Directed by: William Witney
- Starring: Roy Rogers
- Production company: Republic Pictures
- Distributed by: Republic Pictures
- Release date: June 30, 1950
- Running time: 68 minutes
- Country: United States
- Language: English

Trigger, Jr. is a 1950 American Western film directed by William Witney and starring Roy Rogers, his horse Trigger and Dale Evans. It was one of a series of Roy Rogers films produced by Republic Pictures.

== Cast ==
- Roy Rogers
- Dale Evans
- Trigger
- Pat Brady
- Gordon Jones
- Grant Withers
- Peter Miles
- George Cleveland
- Frank Fenton
- Foy Willing and the Riders of the Purple Sage (band)
