= Bells of San Angelo =

1947 film by William Witney

- Theatrical poster
- Directed by: William Witney
- Written by: Paul Gangelin (story); Sloan Nibley (screenplay)
- Produced by: Edward J. White (associate producer)
- Starring: Roy Rogers
- Cinematography: Jack A. Marta
- Edited by: Lester Orlebeck
- Music by: Charles Maxwell
- Production company: Republic Pictures
- Distributed by: Republic Pictures
- Release date: April 15, 1947 (United States)
- Running time: 78 minutes 54 minutes
- Country: United States
- Language: English
- Budget: $491,191

Bells of San Angelo is a 1947 American Trucolor Western film directed by William Witney and starring Roy Rogers. The first Roy Rogers film shot in Trucolor, this modern day Western mixes half a dozen songs with mystery, international smuggling of silver, violence, a pack of dogs and comedy relief with one character packing a "16-shooter" from which 22 shots can be heard during the musical number "Hot Lead" performed by the Sons of the Pioneers.

== Plot ==
Roy is a "border inspector" ever on the alert for smuggling silver between Mexico and the United States. Roy's Mexican friends have told him that one of their own has important information about a silver mine on the American side of the border, but their contact is shot and killed by the mine guards. Before shooting him, they plant a piece of ore containing a high level of silver on his body.

The American mine owners say they play rough, as no towns or law enforcement are anywhere near them and their mine is just across the border, making it a tempting target for robbers who plan to rob the mine then escape to Mexico.

Other events are happening in the area, such as the arrival of Western mystery author Lee Madison, whom Roy and his friends feel ridicules the West and those who live in it. The gang does not know that Lee is really a woman, so when Lee becomes aware of their dislike for her writing, she hides under an alias.

Lionel Bates arrives from England saying Scotland Yard is on the hunt for an English national named George Wallingford Lancaster. Roy notices the news greatly alarms dog-loving sheriff Cookie Bullfincher.

== Cast ==
- Roy Rogers as Roy Rogers
- Trigger as Trigger, Roy's Horse
- Dale Evans as Lee Madison
- Andy Devine as Cookie Bullfincher
- John McGuire as Rex Gridley
- Olaf Hytten as Lionel Bates
- Dave Sharpe as Henchman Ulrich
- Fritz Leiber as Padre
- Hank Patterson as Deaf Bus Passenger
- Fred 'Snowflake' Toones as The Cook
- Eddie Acuff as Bus Driver
- Bob Nolan as Bob
- Sons of the Pioneers as Musicians
- Pat Brady as Pat
- Keefe Brasselle as Ignacio
- Dale Van Sickel as Henchman Mike
- Luana Walters as Lodge Clerk

== Soundtrack ==
- Roy Rogers and Sons of the Pioneers - "The Bells of San Angelo" (Written by John Elliott as Jack Elliott)
- "Lazy Days" (Written by Tim Spencer)
- "I Like to Get Up Early in the Morning" (Written by John Elliott as Jack Elliott)
- "A Cowboy's Dream of Heaven" (Written by John Elliott as Jack Elliott)
- "I Love the West" (Written by John Elliott as Jack Elliott) - Dale Evans
- Pat Brady and Sons of the Pioneers - "Hot Lead" (Written by Tim Spencer)
