= Down Dakota Way =

1949 film by William Witney

- Directed by: William Witney
- Written by: John K. Butler; Sloan Nibley
- Produced by: Edward J. White
- Starring: Roy Rogers; Dale Evans
- Cinematography: Reggie Lanning
- Edited by: Tony Martinelli
- Music by: R. Dale Butts; Nathan Scott
- Production company: Republic Pictures
- Distributed by: Republic Pictures
- Release date: September 9, 1949
- Running time: 67 minutes
- Country: United States
- Language: English

Down Dakota Way is a 1949 American Trucolor Western film directed by William Witney starring Roy Rogers.

== Plot ==
Roy Rogers is called in to investigate after the murder of a veterinarian by a rancher named McKenzie (Roy Barcroft) who is illegally selling cattle with hoof-and-mouth disease.

== Cast ==
- Roy Rogers as Roy
- Dale Evans as Ruth Shaw
- Elisabeth Risdon as Miss Dolly Paxton
- Roy Barcroft as Mac McKenzie
- Byron Barr as Steve Paxton
- Montie Montana as Sheriff Holbrook
