= William Witney =

American director

- Born: William Nuelsen Witney; May 15, 1915; Lawton, Oklahoma, U.S.
- Died: March 17, 2002 (aged 86); Jackson, California, U.S.
- Other name: William Whitney
- Years active: 1939–1982
- Spouse(s): Maxine Doyle (m. 1938–1973; her death); Beverly (m. 1977–2002; his death)
- Website: www.williamwitney.com

William Nuelsen Witney (May 15, 1915 – March 17, 2002) was an American film and television director. He is best remembered for the action films he made for Republic Pictures, particularly serials: Dick Tracy Returns, G-Men vs. the Black Dragon, Daredevils of the Red Circle, Zorro's Fighting Legion, and Drums of Fu Manchu. Prolific and pugnacious, Witney began directing while still in his 20s, and continued working until 1982.

== Biography ==
Witney was born in Lawton, Oklahoma. He was four years old when his father died, and he lived with his uncle, who was an Army captain at Fort Sam Houston. Colbert Clark, Witney's brother-in-law, introduced him to films by letting him ride in some chase scenes for the serial Fighting with Kit Carson (1933). Witney stayed around the Mascot Pictures headquarters while preparing for the entrance exam to the U.S. Naval Academy. After he failed that exam, he continued at the studio.

In 1936 Mascot was absorbed by Republic, and Witney was now working for studio president Herbert Yates. He was an assistant on the serial The Painted Stallion when director Ray Taylor's drinking problem had gotten out of hand and Taylor had to leave the location. Witney replaced Taylor, and became a director permanently.

Witney teamed with director John English for several of Republic's most successful and best-remembered serials. Witney is credited with devising the modern system of filming movie fight sequences. Instead of filming a crowd of people wildly throwing punches at each other, as in a barroom brawl, Witney broke the action down into separate, carefully choreographed shots, which he patterned after the dance sequences in Fred Astaire-Ginger Rogers musicals.

During World War II he served in the US Marine Corps combat cameraman unit.

Following the war, Witney returned to public directing many of Roy Rogers' and Rex Allen's Westerns. He directed the 2nd unit battle scenes of The Last Command (1955) and three juvenile delinquent movies The Cool and the Crazy (1958), Juvenile Jungle (1958) and Young and Wild (1958).

When Republic closed in 1957, he directed films for American International Pictures and Associated Producers Incorporated.

Witney found freelance work in television. He directed the Jim Davis syndicated adventure television series, Rescue 8, which aired from 1958 to 1960 as well as several episodes of Mickey Spillane's Mike Hammer 1958-1960 TV series. He became one of the staff directors of the CBS network series The Wild Wild West. Witney's serial experience was ideal for this series, which ended each quarter-hour with a suspenseful cliffhanger.

He made feature films in the 1960s, such as Master of the World (1961) starring Vincent Price and Charles Bronson, several Westerns for Audie Murphy; Apache Rifles (1964), Arizona Raiders (1965) and 40 Guns to Apache Pass (1966) as well as The Girls on the Beach (1965).

In the 1970s he directed I Escaped from Devil's Island (1973) starring Jim Brown and Darktown Strutters a 1975 blaxploitation musical comedy.

== Personal life ==
Witney was married to former actress Maxine Doyle until her death in 1973. In his later years he was a popular speaker at film and nostalgia conventions. He died of a stroke in 2002.

== Appraisal ==
Quentin Tarantino has called him "one of the greatest action directors in the history of the business." Tarantino considers four films as Witney's best work: The Golden Stallion (1949), a Roy Rogers vehicle, Stranger at My Door (1956), The Bonnie Parker Story (1958), and Paratroop Command (1959).

He was also admired by Bertrand Tavernier.

== Selected filmography ==
- The Law of the Wild (1934) (serial) - assistant director
- The Phantom Empire (1935) (serial) - assistant director
- The Miracle Rider (1935) (serial) - editor
- The Vigilantes Are Coming (1936) (serial) - assistant director, script supervisor
- Darkest Africa (1936) (serial) - script supervisor
- Red River Valley (1936) - script supervisor
- Robinson Crusoe of Clipper Island (1936) (serial) - editor
- Dick Tracy (1937) (serial) - editor, 2nd unit director
- The Painted Stallion (1937) (serial) - director
- S.O.S. Coast Guard (1937) (serial) - director
- The Trigger Trio (1937) - director
- Zorro Rides Again (1937) (serial) - director
- The Lone Ranger (1938) (serial) - director - edited into the feature Hi Yo Silver! (1940)
- The Fighting Devil Dogs (1938) (serial) - director
- Dick Tracy Returns (1938) (serial) - director
- Hawk of the Wilderness (1938) (serial) - director
- The Lone Ranger Rides Again (1939) (serial) - director
- Zorro's Fighting Legion (1939) (serial) - director
- Daredevils of the Red Circle (1939) (serial) - director
- Dick Tracy's G-Men (1939) (serial) - director
- Heroes of the Saddle (1940) - director
- Drums of Fu Manchu (1940) (serial) - director
- Adventures of Red Ryder (1940) (serial) - director
- King of the Royal Mounted (1940) (serial) - director
- Mysterious Doctor Satan (1940) (serial) - director
- Adventures of Captain Marvel (1941) (serial) - director
- Jungle Girl (1941) (serial) - director
- King of the Texas Rangers (1941) (serial) - director
- Dick Tracy vs. Crime, Inc. (1941) (serial) - director
- Spy Smasher (1942) (serial) - director
- The Girl from Alaska (1942) - director (uncredited)
- Perils of Nyoka (1942) (serial) - director
- King of the Mounties (1942) (serial) - director
- Outlaws of Pine Ridge (1942) - director
- G-Men vs. the Black Dragon (1943) (serial) - director
- Roll on Texas Moon (1946) - director
- Home in Oklahoma (1946) - director
- The Crimson Ghost (1946) (serial) - director
- Heldorado (1946) - director
- Apache Rose (1947) - director
- Bells of San Angelo (1947) - director
- Springtime in the Sierras (1947) - director
- On the Old Spanish Trail (1947) - director
- The Gay Ranchero (1948) - director
- Under California Skies (1948) - director
- Eyes of Texas (1948) - director
- Night Time in Nevada (1948) - director
- Grand Canyon Trail (1948) - director
- The Far Frontier (1948) - director
- Susanna Pass (1949) - director
- Down Dakota Way (1949) - director
- Land of Opportunity: The American Rodeo (1949) (documentary) - director
- The Golden Stallion (1949) - director
- Land of Opportunity: The Sponge Driver (1949) (documentary) - director
- Bells of Coronado (1950) - director
- Land of Opportunity: Tillers of the Soil (1950) (documentary) - director
- Land of Opportunity: Mardi Gras (1950) (documentary) - director
- Twilight in the Sierras (1950) - director
- Trigger, Jr. (1950) - director
- Sunset in the West (1950) - director
- North of the Great Divide (1950) - director
- Trail of Robin Hood (1950) - director
- Spoilers of the Plains (1951) - director
- The Wild Blue Yonder (1951) - actor
- Heart of the Rockies (1951) - director
- In Old Amarillo (1951) - director
- South of Caliente (1951) - director
- Pals of the Golden West (1951) - director
- Colorado Sundown (1952) - director
- The Last Musketeer (1952) - director
- Border Saddlemates (1952) - director
- Old Oklahoma Plains (1952) - director
- The WAC from Walla Walla (1952) - director
- South Pacific Trail (1952) - director
- Old Overland Trail (1953) - director
- Iron Mountain Trail (1953) - director
- Down Laredo Way (1953) - director
- Shadows of Tombstone (1953) - director
- The Outcast (1954) - director
- Stories of the Century (1954–55) (TV series) - director
- Santa Fe Passage (1955) - director
- The Last Command (1955) - 2nd unit director
- City of Shadows (1955) - director
- Headline Hunters (1955) - director
- The Fighting Chance (1955) - director
- The Last Command (1955) (battle scenes)
- Stranger at My Door (1956) - director
- A Strange Adventure (1956) - director
- Panama Sal (1957) - director
- Zorro (1958–60) (TV series) - director
- The Cool and the Crazy (1958) - director
- Juvenile Jungle (1958) - director
- Young and Wild (1958) - director
- The Bonnie Parker Story (1958) - director
- Mike Hammer (1959) (TV series) - director
- Special Agent 7 (1959) (TV series) - director
- Lassie (1959) (TV series) - director
- Paratroop Command (1959) - director
- Sky King (1959) (TV series) - director
- Rescue 8 (1959) (TV series) - director
- State Trooper (1959) (TV series) - director
- Frontier Doctor (1956–59) (TV series) - director
- Riverboat (1959–60) (TV series) - director
- Wagon Train (1959–65) (TV series) - director
- Valley of the Redwoods (1960) - director
- Overland Trail (1960) (TV series) - director
- The Secret of the Purple Reef (1960) - director
- M Squad (1960) (TV series) - director
- The Tall Man (1961) (TV series) - editor, director
- Coronado 9 (1960–61) (TV series) - director
- The Long Rope (1961) - director
- The Cat Burglar (1961) - director
- Master of the World (1961) - director
- Frontier Circus (1961–62) (TV series) - director
- Tales of Wells Fargo (1961–62) (TV series) - director
- Mr. Hobbs Takes a Vacation (1962) - 2nd unit director
- The Virginian (1962–69) (TV series) - director
- Wide Country (1963) (TV series) - director
- Laramie (1963) (TV series) - director
- The Alfred Hitchcock Hour (1964) (TV series) - director
- Marnie (1964) - 2nd unit director
- Destry (1964) (TV series) - director
- Apache Rifles (1964) - director
- The Girls on the Beach (1965) - director
- Arizona Raiders (1965) - director
- The Wild Wild West (1965) (TV series) - director
- Branded (1966) (TV series) - director
- Laredo (1966–67) (TV series) - director
- Daniel Boone (1966–67) (TV series) - director
- Bonanza (1966) (TV series) - director
- 40 Guns to Apache Pass (1967) - director
- Hondo (1967) (TV series) - director
- Tarzan (1967–68) (TV series) - director
- The High Chaparral (1967–68) (TV series) - director
- I Escaped from Devil's Island (1973) - director
- The Cowboys (1974) (TV series) - director
- Kodiak (TV series) - director
- Darktown Strutters (1975) - director
- Quell and Co. (1982) a.k.a. Showdown at Eagle Gap - director, actor
