= Springtime in the Sierras =

1947 film

- Theatrical release poster
- Directed by: William Witney
- Screenplay by: Sloan Nibley
- Produced by: Edward J. White
- Starring: Roy Rogers; Trigger; Jane Frazee; Andy Devine
- Cinematography: Jack A. Marta
- Edited by: Tony Martinelli
- Music by: Joseph Dubin; Mort Glickman; Ernest Gold; Nathan Scott
- Production company: Republic Pictures
- Distributed by: Republic Pictures
- Release date: July 15, 1947 (United States)
- Running time: 75 minutes 54 minutes
- Country: United States
- Language: English
- Budget: $298,634

Springtime in the Sierras is a 1947 American Trucolor Western film directed by William Witney and starring Roy Rogers, Trigger, Jane Frazee and Andy Devine.

The film is now in the public domain.

== Plot ==
Singing cowboy Roy Rogers and the Sons of the Pioneers are bringing horses to sell to Jean Loring's (Stephanie Bachelor) ranch. They come across an orphaned faun and decide to bring it to Captain Foster, a retired army captain who gave up the army to look after orphaned animals. Cap has the faun's mortally wounded mother who has been a victim of a gang of poachers shooting out of season that have been nearly wiping out the local animal population. Cap explains that the gang is well organised and sells their meat throughout the nation.

Cap captures the gang of vicious poachers who wear surplus USMC camouflage uniforms and use high powered rifles with sound suppressors. The leader of the poachers gets the drop on Cap and murders him, making his death seem like an accident. Roy, his photographer sidekick Cookie (Andy Devine) and rancher Taffy Baker (Jane Frazee) bring justice to the West and the Animal Kingdom.

== Cast ==
- Roy Rogers as Roy Rogers
- Trigger as Roy's Horse
- Jane Frazee as Taffy Baker
- Andy Devine as Cookie Bullfincher
- Stephanie Bachelor as Jean Loring
- Harold Landon as Bert Baker
- Harry Cheshire as Cap Foster
- Roy Barcroft as Matt Wilkes
- Chester Conklin Old Timer
- Hank Patterson Old Timer
- Whitey Christy as Henchman
- Pascale Perry as Henchman
- Bob Nolan as Musician
- Sons of the Pioneers as Musicians, ranch hands

== Soundtrack ==
- Roy Rogers, Jane Frazee and the Sons of the Pioneers - "Springtime in the Sierras" (Written by Jack Elliott)
- Roy Rogers and Andy Devine - "Oh, What a Picture" (Written by Jack Elliott)
- Roy Rogers and Jane Frazee - "Pedro from Acapulco" (Written by Jack Elliott)
- Roy Rogers and the Sons of the Pioneers - "A Cowboy Has to Sing" (Written by Bob Nolan)
- Andy Devine and the Sons of the Pioneers - "What Are We Gonna Do Then?" (Written by Tim Spencer)
- Roy Rogers and the Sons of the Pioneers - "The Quilting Party (When I Saw Sweet Nellie Home)" (1859) (Lyrics by John Fletcher, music by Frances Kyle)

== Release ==
June 26, 2011 Film Chest released Springtime in the Sierras, rarely ever seen in color, restored from the original, rare, 16mm archive print and digitally re-mastered presented in full frame with an aspect ratio of 4 x 3 and mono sound. Bonus feature: The Chevy Show Easter special (April 2, 1961) featuring Roy Rogers and Dale Evans with special guests Charley Weaver, Eddie Arnold, George Maharis, and The Limeliters.
