= Penny Edwards (actress) =

American actress (1928–1998)

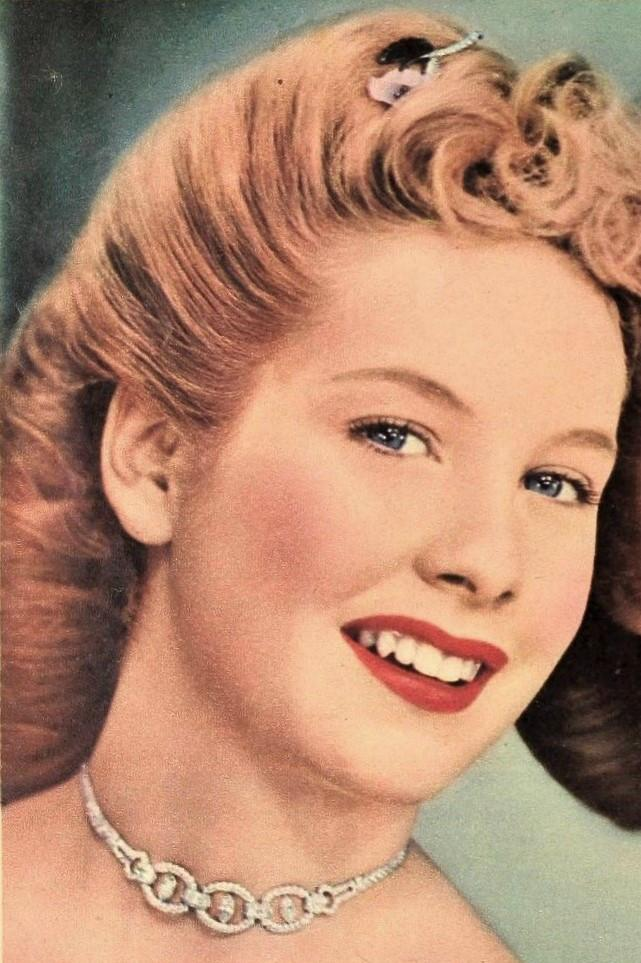
- Penny Edwards in 1945
- Born: Millicent Maxine Edwards; August 24, 1928; New York City, U.S.
- Died: August 26, 1998 (aged 70); Friendswood, Texas, U.S.
- Education: Miami Edison High School
- Occupation: Actress
- Years active: 1947–1961
- Known for: The Dalton Girls; North of the Great Divide; Pony Soldier
- Spouse(s): Ralph H. Winters (m. 1951; div. 1958) Jerry Friedman (m. 1964; div. 19??)
- Children: 3, including Deborah Winters

Millicent Maxine “Penny” Edwards (August 24, 1928 – August 26, 1998) was an American actress who performed on stage, in films, and on television.

== Early years ==
She was born Millicent Maxine Edwards in Jackson Heights, Queens, New York. After moving to Florida, she graduated from Miami Edison High School.

== Career ==
When she was 12 years old, Edwards danced in Let's Face It, and at the age of 14, she appeared on Broadway as a dancer in Ziegfeld Follies of 1943. Her other Broadway credits include Laffing Room Only (1944) and The Duchess Misbehaves (1946).

Edwards' film debut came in My Wild Irish Rose (1947). She also appeared in the films Trail of Robin Hood, Spoilers of the Plains, Heart of the Rockies, In Old Amarillo, North of the Great Divide, Sunset in the West, Street Bandits, Two Guys from Texas and Missing Women, among others.

In the late 1940s, Edwards toured the United States for 14 months, performing in vaudeville.

Public response to Edwards' appearance with Roy Rogers in Sunset in the West (1950) led to her receiving a long-term contract with Republic Pictures.

In the 1950s, Edwards appeared on television in Westerns and mystery programs. Edwards appeared as Nan Gable in the 1958 episode, "Two-Gun Nan", on the syndicated television anthology series, Death Valley Days.

In 1954, Edwards announced her retirement from acting "to do the Lord's work in whatever way He wills." She and her husband, Ralph Winters, planned to join the Seventh-day Adventist Church. In 1956, though, she appeared as Molly Crowley in the TV Western series Cheyenne in the episode titled "Johnny Bravo" that was released as a feature film called The Travelers. She also appeared as Sally Jo Beale opposite George Montgomery playing the title role in Wagon Train S1 E17 "The Jesse Cowan Story" which aired in July 1957. She acted as a guest star on various American television series until 1961.

== Personal life and death ==
Edwards was divorced from Ralph H. Winters and Jerry Friedman. She had a son and two daughters, one of whom is actress Deborah Winters. Edwards died of lung cancer on August 26, 1998, in Friendswood, Texas, at the age of 70.

== Partial filmography ==
- 1947: That Hagen Girl as Christine Delaney
- 1948: Feudin', Fussin' and A-Fightin' as Libby Mathews
- 1948: Two Guys from Texas as Maggie Reed
- 1949: Tucson as Laurie Sherman
- 1950: Trail of Robin Hood as Toby Aldridge
- 1950: North of the Great Divide as Ann Keith
- 1950: Sunset in the West as Dixie Osborne
- 1951: Heart of the Rockies as June Willard
- 1951: In Old Amarillo as Madge Adams
- 1951: Million Dollar Pursuit as Ronnie LaVerne
- 1951: Missing Women as Claudia Rankin
- 1951: Spoilers of the Plains as Frankie Manning
- 1951: Street Bandits as Mildred Anderson
- 1951: Utah Wagon Train as Nancy Bonner
- 1951: The Wild Blue Yonder as Connie Hudson
- 1952: Captive of Billy the Kid as Nancy McCreary
- 1952: Pony Soldier as Emerald Neely
- 1952: Woman in the Dark as Anna Reichardt
- 1953: Powder River as Debbie Allen
- 1957: The Dalton Girls as Columbine Dalton
- 1957: The Restless Gun (Season 1 Episode 12: "Thicker Than Water") as Amy Neilson
- 1957: Ride a Violent Mile as Susan Crowley
- 1957: The Travellers (feature film compilation of two episodes of Cheyenne)
- 1958: The Californians (Season 2 Episode 11: "The Painless Extractionist") as Little Sheba
- 1959: Alfred Hitchcock Presents (Season 5 Episode 8: "The Blessington Method") as Secretary
- 1960: Alfred Hitchcock Presents (Season 6 Episode 5: "The Five-Forty-Eight") as Miss Smith
