= Trail of Robin Hood =

1950 film by William Witney

- Directed by: William Witney
- Written by: Gerald Geraghty
- Starring: Roy Rogers
- Cinematography: John MacBurnie
- Edited by: Tony Martinelli
- Music by: Nathan Scott
- Distributed by: Republic Pictures
- Release date: December 15, 1950
- Running time: 67 minutes
- Country: United States
- Language: English

Trail of Robin Hood is a 1950 American Trucolor Western film directed by William Witney and starring Roy Rogers (in his final Trucolor film) along with a large cast of Western stars. The film was shot in the San Bernardino Mountains and at Big Bear Lake. Despite the title, there is no reference to Robin Hood in the film.

== Plot ==
Roy is a conservation agent preventing loggers from poaching Jack Holt's Christmas trees.

== Cast ==
- Roy Rogers as Himself
- Trigger as Himself
- Penny Edwards as Toby Aldridge
- Gordon Jones as Splinters McGonigle
- Rex Allen as Himself
- Allan Lane as Himself
- Monte Hale as Himself
- William Farnum as Himself
- Tom Tyler as Himself
- Ray Corrigan as Himself
- Kermit Maynard as Himself
- Tom Keene as Himself
- Jack Holt as Himself
- Emory Parnell as J. Corwin Aldridge
- Bobby "Bonedust" Young as Mitch McCall
- James Magill as Henchman Murtagh
- Carol Nugent as Sis McGonigle
- George Chesebro as Himself (as George Cheeseboro)
- Ed Cassidy as Sheriff Duffy
- Foy Willing as Himself
- Stanley Blystone as Doctor
- Riders of the Purple Sage as Holt's workers

== See also ==
- List of Christmas films
