= Heart of the Rockies (1951 film) =

1951 film directed by William Witney

- Film poster
- Directed by: William Witney
- Written by: Eric Taylor
- Produced by: Edward J. White
- Starring: Roy Rogers; Penny Edwards
- Cinematography: Reggie Lanning
- Edited by: Tony Martinelli
- Music by: R. Dale Butts; Nathan Scott
- Distributed by: Republic Pictures
- Release date: 1951
- Running time: 67 minutes
- Country: United States
- Language: English

Heart of the Rockies is a 1951 American Western film directed by William Witney and starring Roy Rogers and Penny Edwards. Despite the title, the Rocky Mountains are not shown in the film.

== Plot ==
Cattle rancher Andrew Willard is upset that the state is building a highway across his land with labor provided by a chain gang. Willard's corrupt ranch foreman Devery is using the opportunity to rustle Willard's purebred cattle and replace them with inferior stock. Devery and Willard try to save the ranch by creating a series of crimes, starting on a dude ranch, that will shift the blame to the laborers. Highway engineer Roy Rogers tries to stop them, but his only ally is Willard's fair-minded daughter June.

== Cast ==
- Roy Rogers as Roy Rogers
- Trigger as Trigger, Roy's Horse
- Bullet as Bullet, Roy's dog
- Penny Edwards as June Willard
- Gordon Jones as "Splinters" McGonigle
- Ralph Morgan as Andrew Willard
- Fred Graham as Devery
- Mira McKinney as Mrs. Edsel
- Robert 'Buzz' Henry as Dave Braddock
- William Gould as Warden Parker
- Pepe Hern as Rocky
- Rand Brooks as Jim Corley
- Foy Willing as Foy (as Foy Willing and the Riders of the Purple Sage)
- Riders of the Purple Sage as Cowhands / Musicians (as Foy Willing and the Riders of the Purple Sage)
