= Sunset in the West =

1950 film

- Theatrical release poster
- Directed by: William Witney
- Written by: Gerald Geraghty
- Produced by: Edward J. White
- Starring: Roy Rogers
- Cinematography: Jack Marta
- Edited by: Tony Martinelli
- Music by: R. Dale Butts
- Production company: Republic Pictures
- Distributed by: Republic Pictures
- Release date: September 25, 1950 (U.S.)
- Running time: 67 minutes
- Country: United States
- Language: English

Sunset in the West is a 1950 American Trucolor Western film produced by Republic Pictures, directed by William Witney, and starring the "King of the Cowboys" Roy Rogers and his palomino Trigger, promoted as "The Smartest Horse in the Movies". Estelita Rodriguez, Penny Edwards, and veteran character actor Will Wright are among the production’s supporting players.

== Plot ==
The entertainment trade paper Variety provides the following plot summary of Sunset in the West in its 1950 review of the film:

Story centers around operations of a gun-smuggling gang, with a well-trained bloodhound part of the plot. Gun-runners force federal agents to take a hand, guns being shipped out via branch railway line, with a station agent in the gang's employ. These operations continue until Rogers resumes his old job as deputy sheriff. Then aided by the bloodhound, he brings the gang to justice.

There is the usual gun battle at the finish, this time with the cowboys shooting it out with the outlaws, who are entrenched back of a freight car and the attached locomotive. With live ammunition cases lying around, this makes for more than customary fireworks as a climax.

== Cast ==
- Roy Rogers as himself
- Trigger, Roy's horse
- Estelita Rodriguez as Carmelita
- Penny Edwards as Dixie Osborne
- Gordon Jones as "Splinters"
- Will Wright as Sheriff Tad Osborne
- Pierre Watkin as Gordon MacKnight
- Charles La Torre as Nick Corella
- William Tannen as John Kimball (as William J. Tannen)
- Steve Pendleton as Walter Kimball (as Gaylord Pendleton)
- Paul E. Burns as "Blinky" Adams, the telegrapher
- Dorothy Ann White as Felitia, the housekeeper
- Foy Willing as Foy
- Riders of the Purple Sage as singers, cowhands

== Reception ==
Singing-cowboy films or "oatuners" generally received far less attention from American Western film critics than other dramatic features. Roy Rogers, however, was a major star, one recognized as "The King of the Cowboys" in Hollywood and by millions of moviegoers from the late 1930s through the 1950s. For that reason, Sunset in the West, like Roy’s other productions, received more coverage in trade publications and newspapers than other films in this genre. In its review in 1950, the film-industry magazine BoxOffice, which had a readership composed chiefly of theater owners, gives high marks to Sunset in the West, although the publication finds the "sagebrush" film's title oddly disconnected from its content:

...here is top-flight western fare worthy of the plaudits not only of Roy Rogers' legions of fans but of theatergoers in general who happen to catch it during its exhibition life. Said patrons may have occasion to wonder just what relation the title has to the subject matter—the answer is, none at all—but otherwise the picture ranks with the best Rogers has made in recent months. Which is to say that from the standpoint of productional adequacy, supporting cast, story content and the embellishment of Trucolor photography, it is fully qualified to attract patronage and deliver an honest measure of entertainment.

Variety endorsed the film as well in 1950, noting that its storyline had "novel twists" and "Rogers' excellent warbling is dovetailed nicely into the plot." In its review the widely read New York trade paper also draws special attention to the performance of Estelita Rodriguez, a regular costar in Roy Rogers' films of that period. "Estelita Rodriguez", writes Variety, "though given a comparatively minor role, impresses...She has excellent pipes and is a looker." Motion Picture Daily, which promoted itself in 1950 as "First in Film News", was yet another contemporary entertainment publication that gave Sunset in the West a positive review, despite what it viewed as some of the picture’s "trite dialogue". In its assessment of the film, the paper remarks, "Roy Rogers gives his usual smooth performance and sings his quota of tuneful songs". Motion Picture Daily also complimented Edward White and William Witney for effectively producing "a compact, action-full film from Gerald Geraghty’s original story." In a more recent review, published in 2005, American Western film critic Dennis Schwartz compliments both the pace of Sunset in the West and its overall direction in a similar fashion, calling it "A rousing action-packed Roy Rogers Western directed with plenty of snap by William Witney."
