= Roll on Texas Moon =

1946 film by William Witney

- Directed by: William Witney
- Written by: Paul Gangelin; Mauri Grashin; Jean Murray
- Produced by: Edward J. White
- Starring: Roy Rogers; Dale Evans; George 'Gabby' Hayes
- Cinematography: William Bradford
- Edited by: Lester Orlebeck
- Music by: R. Dale Butts
- Production company: Republic Pictures
- Distributed by: Republic Pictures
- Release date: September 12, 1946
- Running time: 68 minutes
- Country: United States
- Language: English

Roll on Texas Moon is a 1946 American Western film directed by William Witney and starring Roy Rogers, Dale Evans and George 'Gabby' Hayes. It was produced and distributed by Republic Pictures.

== Cast ==
- Roy Rogers as Himself
- Trigger as Roy's Horse
- George 'Gabby' Hayes as Gabby Whittaker
- Dale Evans as Jill Delaney
- Dennis Hoey as Cole Gregory
- Elisabeth Risdon as Cactus Kate Taylor
- Francis McDonald as Steve Anders
- Edward Keane as Frank B. Wilson
- Tom London as Sheriff Bert Morris
- Harry Strong as Don Williams
- Ed Cassidy as Tom Prescott
- Lee Shumway as Ned Barnes
- Steve Darrell as Joe Cunnings
- Pierce Lyden as Henchman Stuhles

== Bibliography ==
- Pitts, Michael R. Western Movies: A Guide to 5,105 Feature Films. McFarland, 2012.
