= Home in Oklahoma =

1946 film

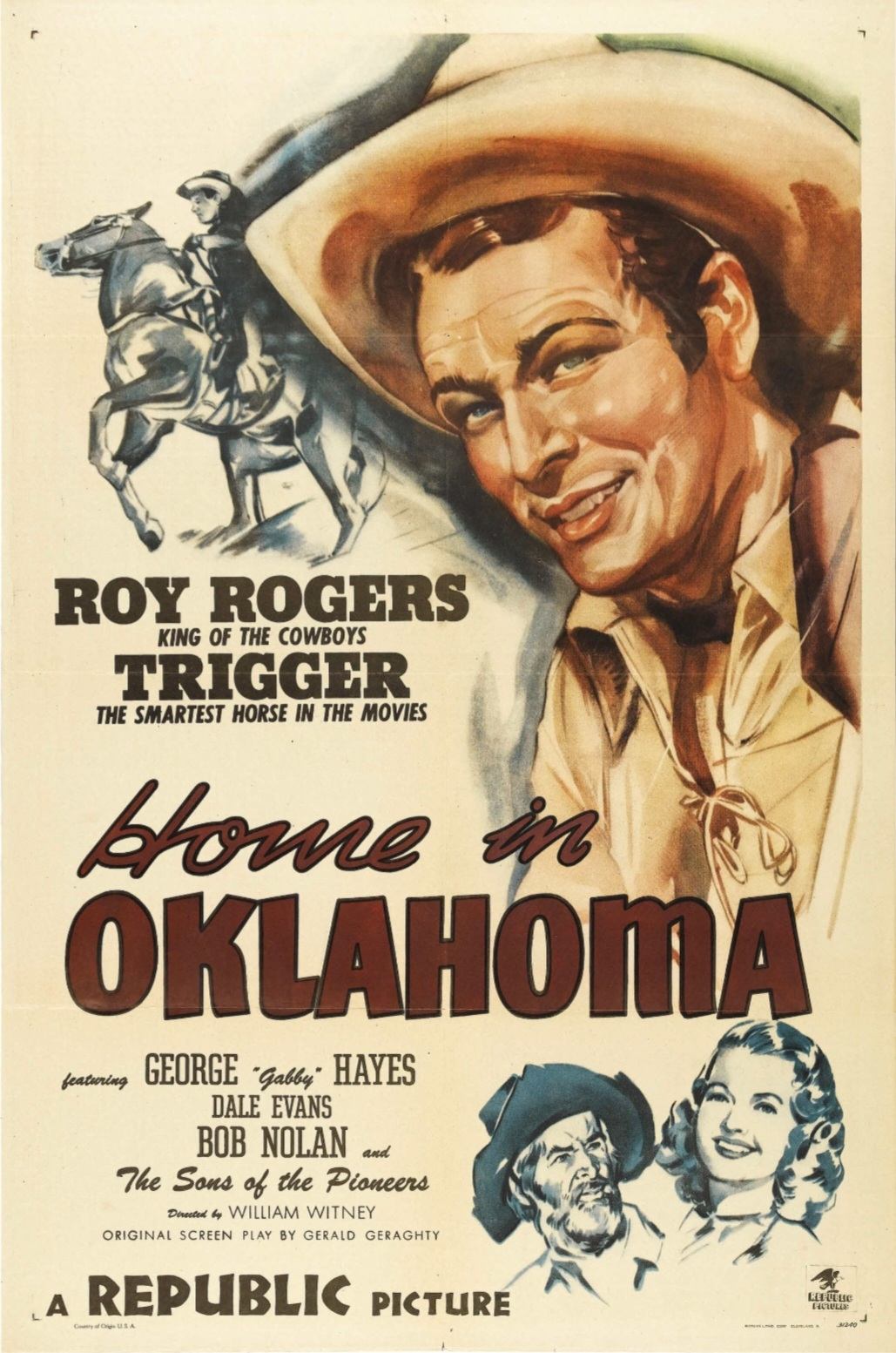
- Theatrical poster
- Directed by: William Witney
- Written by: Gerald Geraghty
- Starring: Roy Rogers
- Distributed by: Republic Pictures
- Release date: October 18, 1946
- Running time: 72 minutes (orig. version)
- Country: United States
- Language: English

Home in Oklahoma is a 1946 American Western film starring Roy Rogers.

== Plot ==
After the wealthy Flying U Ranch owner Sam Talbot is killed by a fall from a horse, reporter Connie Edwards (Dale Evans) enlists the help of newspaper editor Roy Rogers to investigate a rumor that Sam may have actually been murdered. Talbot's 12 year-old ward, Duke Lowery (Lanny Rees), inherits Sam's ranch, much to the dismay of Talbot's greedy niece, Jan Holloway (Carol Hughes). Roy, Dale and ranch hand Gabby (Gabby Hayes) set out to prove Jan is involved in a threat on Duke's life and possibly Sam's murder. Under the superb direction of William Witney, Home in Oklahoma is filled with memorable songs, including Roy and Dale's rendition of the novelty classic "Miguelito."

== Cast ==
- Roy Rogers as Himself
- Trigger as Trigger, the smartest horse in the movies.
- George "Gabby" Hayes as Gabby Whittaker
- Dale Evans as Connie Edwards
- Carol Hughes as Jan Holloway
- George Meeker as Steve McClory
- Lanny Rees as Duke Lowery
- Ruby Dandridge as Devoria - the cook
- George Lloyd as Sheriff
- Arthur Space as Coroner Jud judnick
- Frank Reicher as Jason (lawyer)
- George Carleton as Kennedy (newspaper editor)
- Flying 'L' Ranch Quartet as singers (as Flying 'L' Ranch Quartette)
- Bob Nolan as Bob
- Sons of the Pioneers as Musicians, ranch hands
