= Nan Aspinwall =

American equestrian

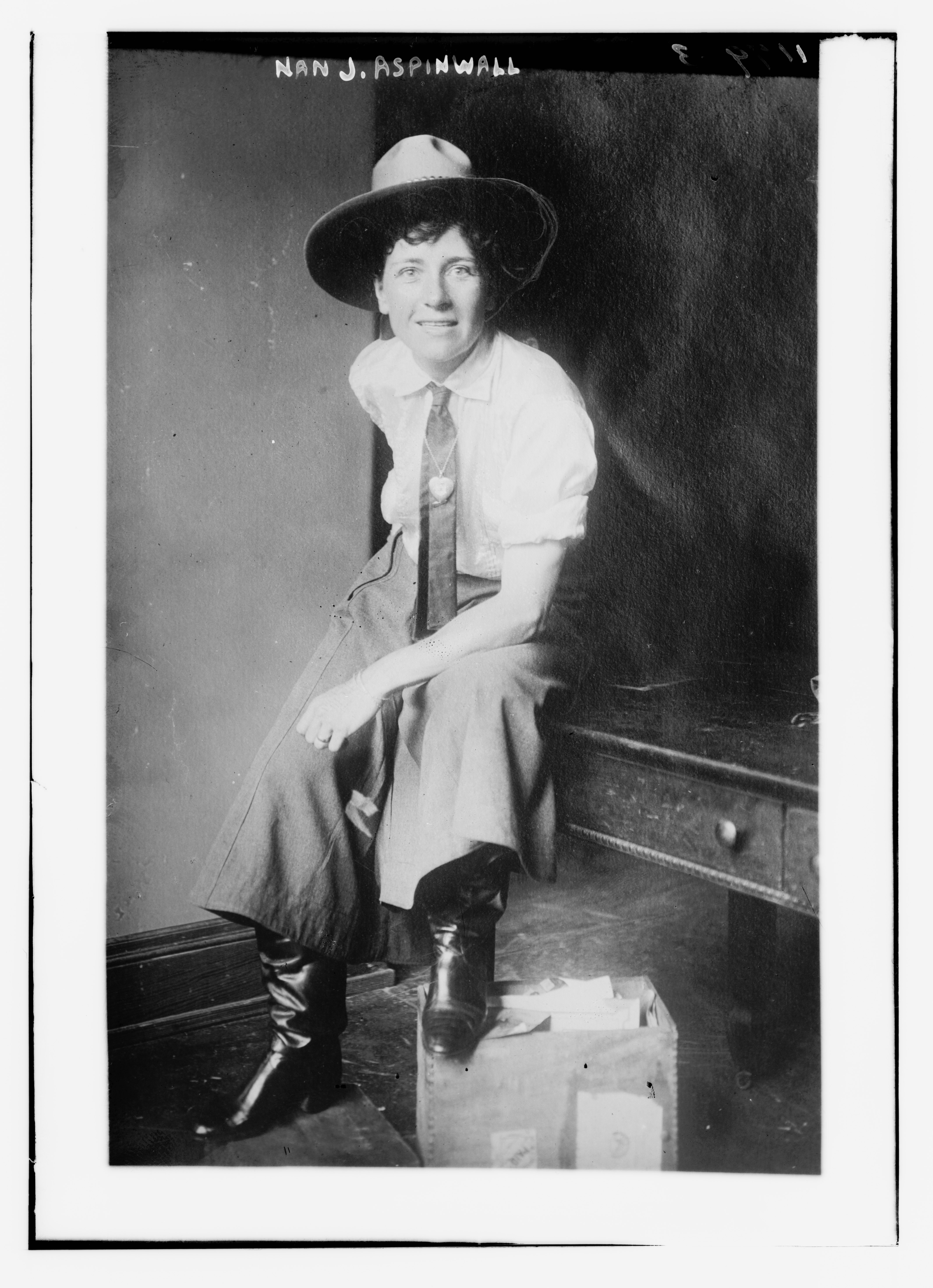
Nan J. Aspinwall

Nan Jeanne Aspinwall Gable Lambell (February 2, 1880 in New York – October 24, 1964) was the first woman to ride on horseback across North America alone. She rode from San Francisco to New York City from September 1, 1910, arriving on July 8, 1911 on a bet from Buffalo Bill, whose Wild West show she performed in with her husband. She rode her Thoroughbred mare, Lady Ellen, on the journey.

She was born in New York under the name Nan Jeanne Aspinwall. She performed as an oriental dancer as well as a horsewoman, sharpshooter, and roper. She also had a vaudeville act with her husband, Frank Gable. She married Frank Gable around 1900; he died in 1929. Frank Gable was a fellow vaudeville actor, trick roper, and her business partner, and they toured together in Wild West shows and Gable's Novelty Show.

== Recognition ==
The actress Penny Edwards appeared as Nan Gable in the 1958 episode, "Two-Gun Nan," of the syndicated anthology series, Death Valley Days. In the story line, sharpshooter Nan, affiliated with William F. Cody's Wild West Show, sets out on a daring thoroughbred horse ride from San Francisco to New York City to prove that a woman could undertake such a task, which required 180 days. Robert "Buzz" Henry (1931–1971) played her husband, Frank Gable, and William O'Neal (1898–1961) was cast as Cody. Still living in 1958, Nan Gable appeared with series host Stanley Andrews at the conclusion of the episode.

A book about her life was published in 2007.

== Bibliography ==
- Higginbotham, Mary C. (October 10, 2007). In Genuine Cowgirl Fashion - The Life and Ride of "Two-Gun" Nan Aspinwall. Preface: Winchester, Juti. The Long Riders Guild Press. ISBN 978-1-59048-258-2.
