= In Old Amarillo =

1951 film by William Witney

- Directed by: William Witney
- Starring: Roy Rogers; Estelita Rodriguez; Penny Edwards
- Distributed by: Republic Pictures
- Release date: 1951
- Country: United States
- Language: English
- Budget: $184,686

In Old Amarillo is a 1951 American Western film starring Roy Rogers.

== Plot ==
Roy is sent to investigate when a greedy land owner tries to capitalize on a drought, cheating property holders like Madge Adams and her grandmother out of the property with the help of ruthless gunman Clint Burnside.

== Cast ==
- Roy Rogers as Roy
- Estelita Rodriguez as Pepita
- Penny Edwards as Madge Adams
- Pinky Lee as Pinky
- Roy Barcroft as Clint
- William Holmes
- Archie Twitchell as Mike Carver
- Roy Rogers Riders
