= On the Old Spanish Trail =

1947 film by William Witney

- Directed by: William Witney
- Written by: Sloan Nibley (screenplay); Gerald Geraghty (original story)
- Produced by: Edward J. White (associate producer)
- Starring: Roy Rogers
- Cinematography: Jack A. Marta
- Edited by: Tony Martinelli
- Music by: R. Dale Butts; Joseph Dubin; Stanley Wilson
- Production company: Republic Pictures
- Distributed by: Republic Pictures
- Release date: October 15, 1947 (United States)
- Running time: 75 minutes 54 minutes 57 minutes
- Country: United States
- Language: English
- Budget: $438,106

On the Old Spanish Trail is a 1947 American Trucolor Western film starring Roy Rogers and directed by William Witney.

== Cast ==
- Roy Rogers as Roy Rogers
- Trigger as Trigger, the Smartest Horse in the West
- Tito Guízar as Rico / The Gypsy
- Jane Frazee as Candy Martin
- Andy Devine as Constable Cookie Bullfincher
- Estelita Rodriguez as Lolita
- Charles McGraw as Harry Blaisdell
- Fred Graham as Henchman Marcos
- Steve Darrell as Henchman Al
- Marshall Reed as Henchman Gus
- Wheaton Chambers as Oil Co. Clerk Silas MacIntyre
- Bob Nolan as Bob
- Sons of the Pioneers as Musicians

== Soundtrack ==
- Tito Guízar - "I'll Never Love Again" based on "La borrachita" (Written by Ignacio Fernández Esperón, English lyrics by Al Stewart)
- Estelita Rodriguez and Tito Guízar - "Guadalajara" (Written by Pepe Guízar)
- Roy Rogers and Jane Frazee - "My Adobe Hacienda" (Written by Louise Massey and Lee Penny)
- Roy Rogers and the Sons of the Pioneers - "On the Old Spanish Trail" (Music by Kenneth Leslie-Smith, lyrics by Jimmy Kennedy)
- Tito Guízar - "Una furtiva lagrima" from the opera L'elisir d'amore (Music by Gaetano Donizetti, libretto by Felice Romani)
- Sons of the Pioneers - "Here Is My Helping Hand" (Written by Bob Nolan)
- "Bolero" (Written by M.H. Sturgis and W.P. Blake)
