= North of the Great Divide =

1950 film by William Witney

- Theatrical release poster
- Directed by: William Witney
- Written by: Eric Taylor
- Produced by: Edward J. White
- Starring: Roy Rogers; Penny Edwards; Gordon Jones
- Cinematography: Jack A. Marta
- Edited by: Tony Martinelli
- Music by: R. Dale Butts
- Production company: Republic Pictures
- Distributed by: Republic Pictures
- Release date: November 15, 1950
- Running time: 67 Minutes
- Country: United States
- Language: English

North of the Great Divide is a 1950 American Western film directed by William Witney and starring Roy Rogers, Penny Edwards and Gordon Jones.

== Plot ==
The Oseka Indian tribe near the Canadian border has been subsisting on the salmon from a nearby river for centuries. The tribe enjoys a good relationship with the Royal Canadian Mounted Police. Roy Rogers, one of their most important friends, leaves to join the Office of Indian Affairs in order to defend their way of life.

Mr. Banning informs Nogura, the head of the Oseka village, that he plans to build a salmon cannery next to the river. Nogura worries that the cannery will deplete the river of fish, but Banning assures him that there will be enough for everyone. Banning wants to hire the Osekas to work for him.

As Nogura feared, the salmon traps catch all of the fish and leave none to the Osekas. When Nogura complains, Banning and his foreman Stagg suggest that the Osekas move further north and end their reliance on salmon.

Henry Gates, a supervisor at the Office of Indian Affairs, learns from nurse Ann Keith that conditions in the Oseka village have become terrible. He sends Rogers to prevent the threat of violence and contemplates moving the Osekas to a reservation.

Roy brings a herd of cattle that will prevent them from starving. With Ann, he tries to avoid an Indian war, as the Osekas have threatened to rob the cannery. The cannery foreman suggests murdering Roy, but Banning's plan is to pretend to compromise, allowing some fish to reach the tribe. Banning insists that the Osekas have been damaging the property of the Canadian cannery.

When a Canadian Mountie is found dead, Nogura, who has been seen taking salmon from traps, is suspected as the murderer. Stagg, the real culprit, plots with Banning to murder Nogura to prevent him from providing evidence. One of Roy's friends overhears the men and informs Roy of the plot. Roy brings Nogura to the sheriff for extradition to Canada, but he plans to prove Nogura's innocence. He suggests that Canada and the United States should cooperate to draft laws to protect the salmon and ensure a sufficient food supply for the Osekas.

The Osekas, angered by Nogura's imprisonment, storm the jail house but find him missing. Roy and his Indian friends rescue Nogura and take him to the police to prove his innocence and reveal the truth about Banning and Stagg, who had schemed to destroy the Canadian cannery to fulfill a huge contract and improve their earnings before any laws could be enacted to protect the salmon. During a failed attempt to torch the Canadian cannery, Stagg had been seen by the Mountie, so he killed him. Stagg and his men had later attacked the sheriff and captured Nogura to frame him for their destruction of the Canadian cannery. Just as the Mountie sergeant accepts that Nogura is innocent, the protagonists learn that Banning and Stagg are again attempting to set the Canadian cannery ablaze. During a final shootout, the arson plan is foiled.

The Osekas celebrate that the last of Banning's traps has been removed. Roy announces that new international treaties to protect the salmon run will take effect before the next season.

== Cast ==
- Roy Rogers as himself
- Penny Edwards as Ann Keith
- Gordon Jones as Splinters Mcgonagle
- Roy Barcroft as Banning
- Jack Lambert as Henchman Stagg
- Douglas Evans as Mountie Sergeant
- Trigger as himself
- Keith Richards as Tacona
- Noble Johnson as Nagura
- Foy Willing as Singing Cowhand
- Iron Eyes Cody
