= Feudin', Fussin' and A-Fightin' =

1948 film by George Sherman

- Directed by: George Sherman
- Screenplay by: D.D. Beauchamp
- Based on: The Wonderful Race at Rimrock by D.D. Beauchamp
- Produced by: Leonard Goldstein
- Starring: Donald O'Connor; Marjorie Main; Percy Kilbride
- Cinematography: Irving Glassberg
- Edited by: Edward Curtiss
- Music by: Leith Stevens
- Production company: Universal Pictures
- Distributed by: Universal Pictures
- Release date: June 1948
- Running time: 78 minutes
- Country: United States
- Language: English
- Budget: $454,000. or $460,000 or $600,000
- Box office: $1 million (est)

Feudin', Fussin' and A-Fightin' is a 1948 American musical comedy film directed by George Sherman and starring Donald O'Connor. Also featured are Marjorie Main and Percy Kilbride (who later reprised essentially the same roles as Ma and Pa Kettle),with Penny Edwards as the perky love interest. It was produced and distributed by Universal Studios. One scene features a dance routine in a barn, choreographed to the Ted Lewis song "Me and My Shadow".

== Plot ==
Wilbur McMurtry is a traveling salesman who is captured and held hostage by the local authorities in a small town. They wish to compel him to run in the annual foot-race against a rival town. The stakes are if they lose they'll be incorporated into a rival town that they don't like very much. Maribel Mathews, the feisty female Mayor, is determined to prevent this. When O'Connor runs like the dickens to catch a stagecoach, Maribel thinks she's found her man and overtakes the stage to grab Wilbur.

Wilbur takes a liking to Maribel's pretty niece Libby. And when he finds out his opponent in the race, Emory Tuttle, is also his romantic rival, he eventually decides to run the race. Wilbur is held semi-prisoner in the town livery stable so he doesn't get cold feet. The rival town attempts to slip Wilbur a Mickey Finn, but Jasper The Horse drinks it instead. The town veterinarian, in cahoots with the other side, says the horse must be kept active all night or it will die. So Wilbur stays up all night and is dead on his feet the day of the race.

Wilbur is pepped up by encounters with mother nature (rattlesnake, porcupine, skunk), but it takes a dose of his famous patent medicine to give him the speed to win the race. The town joyfully elects Wilbur the new Mayor. Now that Maribel is unemployed, her longtime admirer Billy Caswell finally gets up the bravery to propose (and is accepted).

== Cast ==
- Donald O'Connor as Wilbur McMurty
- Marjorie Main as Maribel Mathews
- Percy Kilbride as Billy Caswell
- Penny Edwards as Libby Mathews
- Joe Besser as Sharkey Dolan, Town Sheriff
- Harry Shannon as Chauncey
- Fred Kohler Jr. as Emory Tuttle
- Howland Chamberlain as Doc Overholt
- Edmund Cobb as Stage Driver
- Joel Friedkin as Stage Passenger
- I. Stanford Jolley as Guard
- Kenneth Mac Donald as Contest Judge(uncredited)
- Charles Middleton as Townsman (uncredited)

== Production ==
In January 1948, Universal announced they would make a movie the following month based on the magazine story The Wonderful Race at Rimrock. The film reunited Main and Kilbride from The Egg and I. Main was borrowed from MGM.

O'Connor has a dance number which involves running up a wall; this inspired his "Make 'Em Laugh" routine in Singing in the Rain.
