= Gordon Jones (actor) =

American actor (1912–1963)

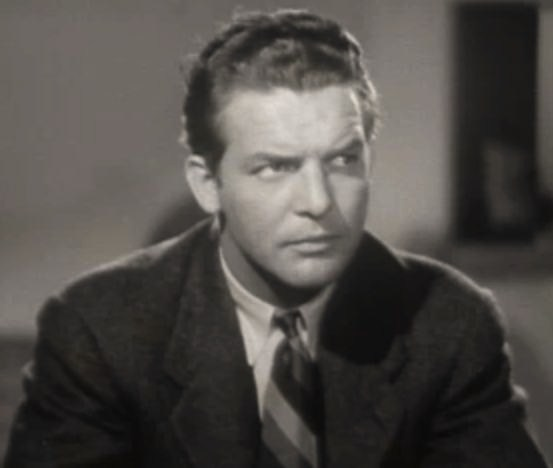
- Gordon Jones in I Take This Oath (1940)
- Born: April 5, 1911; Alden, Iowa, U.S.
- Died: June 20, 1963 (aged 52); Tarzana, California, U.S.
- Education: University of California at Los Angeles
- Occupation: Actor
- Years active: 1931–1963
- Spouse: Lucile Van Winkle (1935–1940)

Gordon Wynnivo Jones (April 5, 1911 – June 20, 1963) was an American character actor, a member of John Wayne's informal acting company best known for playing Lou Costello's TV nemesis "Mike the Cop" and appearing as the Green Hornet in the first of two movie serials based on that old-time radio program.

== Selected filmography ==
Year	Title	Role	Notes
1931	Cimarron	Teamster	(uncredited)
1932	Wild Girl	Vigilante	(uncredited)
1933	The Monkey's Paw	Soldier	(uncredited)
1935	Car 99	Mechanic	(uncredited)
1935	Let 'Em Have It	Tex	
1935	Red Salute	Michael (Lefty) Jones	
1936	Strike Me Pink	Butch Carson	
1936	Captain Calamity	Henchman	(uncredited)
1936	Devil's Squadron	Tex	
1936	Walking on Air	Joe	
1936	Don't Turn 'Em Loose	Joe Graves	
1936	Night Waitress	Martin Rhodes	
1937	We Who Are About to Die	Slim Tolliver	
1937	They Wanted to Marry	Jim	
1937	Sea Devils	Puggy	
1937	China Passage	Joe Dugan	
1937	There Goes My Girl	Reporter Dunn	
1937	Forlorn River	Lem Watkins	(uncredited)
1937	The Big Shot	Chester 'Chet' Scott	
1937	Fight for Your Lady	Mike Scanlon	
1937	Quick Money	Bill Adams	
1938	Night Spot	Riley	
1938	Rich Man, Poor Girl	Tom Grogan	
1938	I Stand Accused	Blackie	
1938	Out West with the Hardys	Ray Holt	
1939	Long Shot	Jeff Clayton	
1939	Pride of the Navy	Joe Falcon	
1939	Big Town Czar	Chuck Hardy	(uncredited)
1939	Invitation to Happiness	Dutch Arnold	(uncredited)
1939	Grand Jury Secrets	Billy Hargraves	(uncredited)
1939	When Tomorrow Comes	Radio Technician	(uncredited)
1939	Disputed Passage	Bill Anderson	
1939	Henry Goes Arizona	Tug Evans	(uncredited)
1940	The Green Hornet	Britt Reid / The Green Hornet	Serial
1940	The Doctor Takes a Wife	O'Brien	
1940	I Take This Oath	Steve Hanagan	
1940	Up in the Air	Tex	
1940	Girl from Havana	Tubby Waters	
1940	Texas Rangers Ride Again	Ranger Radio Man	(uncredited)
1941	Reaching for the Sun	Sailor	(uncredited)
1941	The Blonde from Singapore	'Waffles' Billings	
1941	You Belong to Me	Robert Andrews	
1941	The Feminine Touch	Rubber-Legs Ryan	
1941	Among the Living	Bill Oakley	
1942	True to the Army	Pvt. Dugan	
1942	To the Shores of Tripoli	Military Policeman at Main Gate	(uncredited)
1942	They All Kissed the Bride	Taxi Driver	(uncredited)
1942	My Sister Eileen	'The Wreck' Loomis	
1942	Highways by Night	'Footsy' Fogarty	
1942	Flying Tigers	Alabama Smith	
1944	Buffalo Bill	Trooper	(uncredited)
1944	Youth Runs Wild	Truck Driver	(uncredited)
1945	Wanderer of the Wasteland	Sheriff	(uncredited)
1947	The Secret Life of Walter Mitty	Tubby Wadsworth	
1947	The Wistful Widow of Wagon Gap	Jake Frame	
1948	A Foreign Affair	Military Policeman	
1948	Sons of Adventure	Andy Baldwin	
1948	Black Eagle	Benjy Laughton	
1948	The Untamed Breed	Happy Keegan	
1949	Take Me Out to the Ball Game	Senator Catcher	(uncredited)
1949	Mr. Soft Touch	Muggles	(uncredited)
1949	Easy Living	Bill Holloran	
1949	Black Midnight	Roy	
1949	Tokyo Joe	Idaho	
1949	Dear Wife	Taxi Cab Driver	
1949	Bodyhold	Pat Simmons	
1950	Belle of Old Mexico	Tex Barnet	
1950	The Palomino	Bill Hennessey	
1950	The Arizona Cowboy	I.Q. Barton	
1950	Trigger, Jr.	Splinters McGonagle	
1950	Big Timber	Jocko	
1950	Sunset in the West	Splinters McGonagle	
1950	North of the Great Divide	Splinters McGonigle	
1950	Trail of Robin Hood	Splinters McGonigle	
1951	Spoilers of the Plains	Splinters McGonigle	
1951	Heart of the Rockies	Splinters McGonigle	
1951	Corky of Gasoline Alley	Elwood Martin	
1951	Yellow Fin	Breck	
1952	The Marrying Kind (1952)	Steve	(uncredited)
1952	Gobs and Gals	CPO Mike Donovan	
1952	Sound Off	Sgt. Crockett	
1952	The Winning Team	George Glasheen	
1952	Big Jim McLain	Olaf	
1952	Wagon Team	Marshal Sam Taplin	
1953	Woman They Almost Lynched	Yankee Sergeant	
1953	Island in the Sky	Walrus	
1953	Take the High Ground!	Moose	(uncredited)
1954	The Outlaw Stallion	Wagner	
1955	Treasure of Ruby Hills	Jack Voyle	
1955	Smoke Signal	Cpl. Rogers	
1957	Spring Reunion	Jack Frazer	
1957	Shoot-Out at Medicine Bend	Pvt. Wilbur 'Will' Clegg	
1957	The Monster That Challenged the World	Sheriff Josh Peters	
1958	Live Fast, Die Young	Pop Winters	
1958	The Perfect Furlough	'Sylvia', MP #1	
1959	The Shaggy Dog	Captain Scanlon, Police Chief	
1959	Battle Flame	Sgt. McKelvey	
1959	The Big Fisherman		(uncredited)
1959	Battle of the Coral Sea	Torpedoman Bates	
1960	The Rise and Fall of Legs Diamond	Sgt. Joe Cassidy	
1961	Master of the World	Talkative Morgantown townsperson	(uncredited)
1961	The Absent-Minded Professor	Rutland Coach	(uncredited)
1963	Son of Flubber	Rutland Coach	(uncredited)
1963	McLintock!	Matt Douglas	(released posthumously, final film role)
