= I Take This Oath =

- Film poster
- Directed by: Sam Newfield (as Sherman Scott)
- Written by: George Bricker (writer); William A. Ullman Jr. (story)
- Produced by: Sigmund Neufeld
- Starring: See below
- Cinematography: Jack Greenhalgh
- Edited by: Holbrook N. Todd
- Distributed by: Producers Releasing Corporation
- Release date: May 20, 1940
- Running time: 64 minutes
- Country: United States
- Language: English

I Take This Oath is a 1940 American crime drama film directed by Sam Newfield under the pseudonym of Sherman Scott. Featuring Gordon Jones and Joyce Compton, it was the first release by Producers Releasing Corporation. In 1952, Pictorial Films reissued it for television showings as Police Rookie.

== Plot ==
Police officer Mike Hanagan (Robert Homans) attempts to expose a fraudulent official who works with a gang of racketeers, but the official has Hanagan murdered. Hanagan's son Steve (Gordon Jones) decides to avenge his father, and at the suggestion of his girlfriend Betty Casey (Joyce Compton), he joins the police force.

Under the instruction of Daniel Casey (Guy Usher), Betty's father, Steve begins learning how to be an officer. However, as he has become so dedicated to finding his father's murderer, he begins to fall behind in his law studies, and due to his poor grades, he is dismissed from the force. Steve believes he has found the clue that points to his friend Joe Kelly's (Craig Reynolds) uncle Jim Kelly (Sam Flint) being the murderer.

When Jim hears that Steve suspects him, he decides that Steve must be killed. A struggle ensues between Steve and Jim, and a bullet is fired at Steve, but Joe is hit instead, and Steve then shoots Jim. Impressed, Casey returns to allow Steve back onto the police force.

== Cast ==
- Gordon Jones as Steve Hanagan
- Joyce Compton as Betty Casey
- Craig Reynolds as Joe Kelly
- J. Farrell MacDonald as Insp. Tim Ryan
- Veda Ann Borg as Flo
- Mary Gordon as Mrs. Eileen Hanagan
- Robert Homans as Mike Hanagan
- Sam Flint as Uncle Jim Kelly
- Guy Usher as Capt. Casey
- Brooks Benedict as Burly
- Edward Peil, Sr. as Sgt. Riley
- Budd Buster as Jones
