= Grand Canyon Trail =

1948 film by William Witney

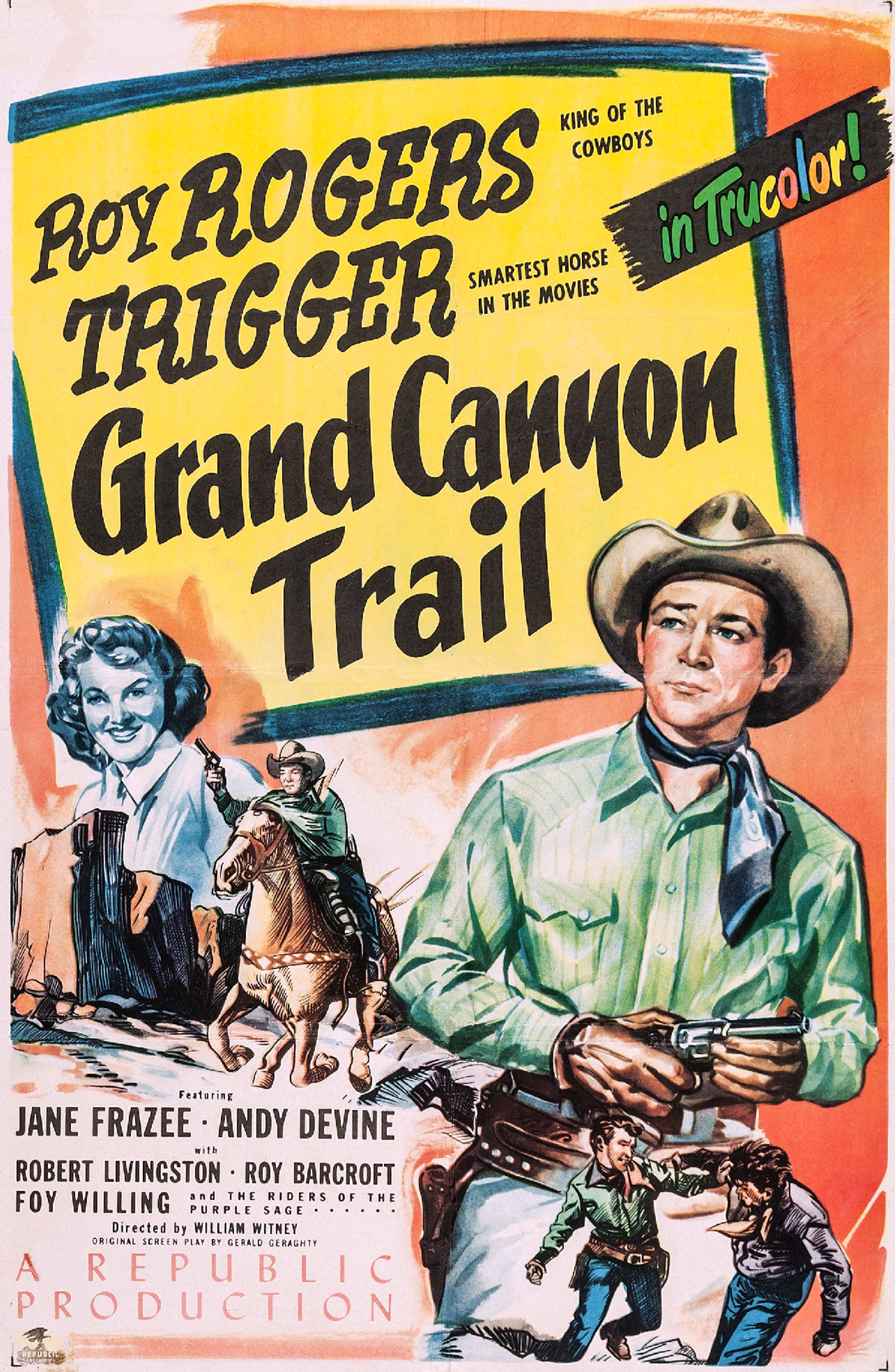
- Film poster
- Directed by: William Witney
- Written by: Gerald Geraghty
- Starring: Roy Rogers
- Cinematography: Reggie Lanning
- Edited by: Tony Martinelli
- Music by: Nathan Scott
- Distributed by: Republic Pictures
- Release date: November 5, 1948
- Running time: 67 minutes 54 minutes
- Country: United States
- Language: English

Grand Canyon Trail is a 1948 American Western film starring Roy Rogers combining Western action with Three Stooges-style slapstick. Robert Livingston plays the head villain and James Finlayson plays the sheriff. The Republic Pictures film was shot in Trucolor, but only black and white prints survive.

== Plot ==
Sintown is a ghost town that was once believed to have had a lode of silver, but the mines have been depleted. J. Malcolm Vanderpool's determined secretary Carol Martin impersonates Vanderpool's daughter and travels west to help her boss, who had invested in the mine. She discovers that Regan, a mining engineer employed by Vanderpool, has kidnapped Old Ed Carruthers, an old prospector who has found silver, but Regan wishes to keep the information secret for his own benefit. He puts Carol up in the haunted Hangman's Hotel until Roy Rogers, Old Ed's mule Genevieve and Roy's singing posse, the Riders of the Purple Sage, attempt to rescue the prospector and bring the villains to justice.

== Cast ==
- Roy Rogers as Roy Rogers
- Trigger as Trigger, Roy's Horse
- Jane Frazee as Carol Martin aka Carol Vanderpool
- Andy Devine as Cookie Bullfincher
- Robert Livingston as Bill Regan
- Roy Barcroft as Dave Williams (Regan henchman)
- Charles Coleman as J. Malcolm Vanderpool
- Emmett Lynn as Old Ed Carruthers
- Ken Terrell as Mike Delaney (Regan henchman)
- James Finlayson as Sheriff
- Tommy Coats as Henchman Bannister
- Foy Willing as Singer, Rancher
- Riders of the Purple Sage as Singing Ranchers
