= Street Bandits =

1951 film by R. G. Springsteen

- Theatrical release poster
- Directed by: R. G. Springsteen
- Screenplay by: Milton Raison
- Produced by: William T. Lackey
- Starring: Penny Edwards; Robert Clarke; Ross Ford; Roy Barcroft; John Eldredge; Helen Wallace
- Cinematography: John MacBurnie
- Edited by: Arthur Roberts
- Music by: Stanley Wilson
- Production company: Republic Pictures
- Distributed by: Republic Pictures
- Release date: November 15, 1951
- Running time: 54 minutes
- Country: United States
- Language: English

Street Bandits is a 1951 American crime film directed by R. G. Springsteen, written by Milton Raison and starring Penny Edwards, Robert Clarke, Ross Ford, Roy Barcroft, John Eldredge and Helen Wallace. It was released on November 15, 1951 by Republic Pictures.

== Plot ==
Young lawyers Fred Palmer and Tom Reagan open an office down the hall from one occupied by L.T. Mitchell, who fronts a slot-machine operation run by Monk Walter, a brutal racketeer. Fred and Tom extend an invitation to a welcome party to Mitchell, who declines, but his stenographer Mildred Anderson accepts and quickly develops a romantic attraction to Fred.

Trouble brews when Tom disapproves of the way Fred is representing guilty clients, including Walter, who commits violent crimes as soon as he is back on the street. Tom dissolves the partnership to become district attorney and Mildred, after marrying Fred, also leaves.

After the cold-blooded murder of Mitchell, a guilty conscience persuades Fred to change his ways, but Walter shoots him. Walter is killed during a police pursuit. Fred recovers in the hospital and Mildred returns to his side.

== Cast ==
- Penny Edwards as Mildred Anderson
- Robert Clarke as Fred Palmer
- Ross Ford as Tom Reagan
- Roy Barcroft as Monk Walter
- John Eldredge as L.T. Mitchell
- Helen Wallace as Mrs. Martha Palmer
- Arthur Walsh as Arnold 'Blackie' Black
- Harry Hayden as William Carrington
- Emmett Vogan as District Attorney Burnell
- Jane Adams as Jane Phillips
- Charles Wagenheim as Gus Betts
- Richard Bartlett as Johnny Mayer
- Norman Field as Dr. Sawyer
- Robert Long as The Judge
- Dick Cogan as Court Clerk
