= Apache Rose =

1947 film by William Witney

- Theatrical poster
- Directed by: William Witney
- Written by: Gerald Geraghty (writer)
- Produced by: Edward J. White (associate producer)
- Starring: Roy Rogers
- Cinematography: Jack A. Marta
- Edited by: Lester Orlebeck
- Music by: Leo Arnaud; Charles Maxwell; Frank Perkins; Stanley Wilson
- Production company: Republic Pictures
- Distributed by: Republic Pictures
- Release date: February 15, 1947 (United States)
- Running time: 75 minutes 54 minutes
- Country: United States
- Language: English
- Budget: $311,994

Apache Rose is a 1947 American Trucolor Western film directed by William Witney and starring Roy Rogers. It was the first Roy Rogers Western shot in the process though most copies on DVD are in monochrome.

== Plot ==
When oil is discovered on a Vegas ranch, Mexican gambler Carlos is in a deadly fight with his enemies for the oil, putting his girlfriend (Dale Evans) at risk as well as his female cousin whom the bad guys shoot in the arm. His girlfriend then masquerades as his wounded cousin narrowly missing getting killed but cowboy hero Roy Rogers catches wind of the plot and rescues Dale aka Carlos' cousin. Eventually the bad guys are brought to justice after a tense battle on the seashore with guns and fists.

== Cast ==
- Roy Rogers as Roy Rogers
- Trigger as Trigger, Roy's Horse
- Dale Evans as Billie Colby
- Olin Howland as Alkali Elkins
- George Meeker as Reed Calhoun
- John Laurenz as Henchman Pete
- Russ Vincent as Carlos Vega
- Minerva Urecal as Felicia
- LeRoy Mason as Henchman Hilliard
- Donna Martell as Rosa Vega
- Terry Frost as Sheriff Jim Mason
- Conchita Lemus as Dancer
- Tex Terry as Henchman Likens
- Bob Nolan as Bob
- Sons of the Pioneers as Musicians

== Soundtrack ==
- Sons of the Pioneers - "Apache Rose" (Written by John Elliott)
- Roy Rogers and chorus - "Ride Vaqueros" (Written by John Elliott)
- Dale Evans and the Sons of the Pioneers - "José" (Written by Glenn Spencer and Tim Spencer)
- Roy Rogers - "At the Wishing Well" (Written by John Elliott)
- Dale Evans - "There's Nothing Like Coffee in the Morning" (Written by John Elliott)
