= The Dalton Girls =

1957 film by Reginald LeBorg

- Theatrical release poster
- Directed by: Reginald LeBorg
- Screenplay by: Maurice Tombragel
- Story by: Herbert Purdom
- Produced by: Howard W. Koch
- Starring: Merry Anders; Lisa Davis; Penny Edwards; Sue George; John Russell
- Cinematography: Carl E. Guthrie
- Edited by: John F. Schreyer
- Music by: Les Baxter
- Production company: Bel-Air Productions
- Distributed by: United Artists
- Release date: December 20, 1957
- Running time: 71 minutes
- Country: United States
- Language: English

The Dalton Girls is a 1957 American Western film directed by Reginald LeBorg and starring Merry Anders, Lisa Davis, Penny Edwards, Sue George and John Russell.

== Plot ==
Two men on horseback are fleeing a posse. Pistol shots are exchanged and the two men are killed. The scene shifts to town where the undertaker, Slidell, has posted a fee of twenty-five cents to view the remains of the Dalton brothers.

A private agency detective, Parsh, approaches Slidell wanting to identify the bodies. Slidell insists on the fee. As Parsh views the bodies, Slidell taunts the detective that he had been unable to apprehend the Dalton brothers though pursuing them for years.

Two young women arrive. Parsh greets them as Holly and Rose; he expresses his condolences, but he is rebuked by Holly. Holly pushes past both men to view the bodies and Parsh leaves. Slidell follows Holly and takes the opportunity to physically accost her. Holly resists, killing Slidell in the struggle. Holly and Rose flee.

Six years later, in Eastern Colorado, Holly and Rose, along with their sisters, Columbine and Marigold, prepare to rob a stagecoach using subterfuge. Two of the sisters ride as passengers on the coach; Columbine is attracted to another passenger, a smooth-talking gambler, "Illinois" Grey. During the robbery, Grey insists Columbine take his pocket watch as part of the robbery loot. Rose shoots two men who attempt to bring firearms to bear, killing one.

The four sisters escape to the shack where they live, only to discover that the expected payroll is not in the strongbox they've taken; this leads to a brief confrontation. Meanwhile, Marigold meets a young man at the barn. He asks her to marry him, but then flees when he learns that the sisters are Daltons. Holly and Rose chase him down and leave him tied up while the sisters make their further escape.

Meanwhile, in town, Grey is not cooperative when asked for a witness statement about the stagecoach robbery, apparently trying to protect the sisters, though there are other witnesses.

At a campfire, the other sisters listen as Rose sings a song about her gun being more dependable than any man. Afterward, they discuss plans for another robbery and Columbine suggests they go to a gold camp, Dry Creek, though she doesn't reveal that she knows this was Illinois Grey's destination.

In Dry Creek, Grey demands payment of a gambling debt from a banker, Sewell. The banker begs off until the evening. As Grey leaves, the sisters begin infiltrating the same bank, intent on robbing it. However, Grey recognizes Columbine, who returns his watch when he confronts her. Grey insists on accompanying Columbine to her "new job" and inadvertently interferes in the robbery. Rose kills Sewell when the banker grabs a pistol and then shoots Grey, the only witness, though Columbine objects. The sisters don't know that Grey is unharmed because Rose's bullet struck his pocket watch.

The sisters elude a posse but then argue. Columbine accuses Holly and Rose of being deliberately violent. Marigold pleads for peace between the sisters, threatening to kill herself.

In town, Grey once more is evasive as a witness, saying only that three women were the robbers. Parsh confronts him privately, specifying that he wants to capture the sisters after a string of crimes. Grey claims not to know the Dalton sisters and suggests the robbers were female impersonators. More deliberate than the posse, Grey tracks the sisters to Tombstone.

In Tombstone, Grey renews his acquaintance with the town lawman, who informs him that the big poker game is in a private hotel room that night. Later, Grey encounters Holly and Rose who are working as dance hall girls. Grey demands the money they stole from Sewell, the banker, insisting it was owed him. He tells them to bring the money that evening on threat of reporting their wanted status to the local authorities.

Grey finds out where the sisters live and goes there to see Columbine. He pleads with her to come away with him but, in the end, she sends him away.

While the gamblers gather for the big poker game, and the sisters get dressed while developing a plan to rob the game, Parsh arrives in town.

The sisters go about preparing their escape, taking measures to make pursuit difficult, infiltrating the hotel where the game is being played, and eluding the lawman providing security. They confront the players and gather their money. Columbine threatens to shoot Rose if Grey is harmed. The sisters exit to the street and are riding away when Parsh steps out and begins shooting, killing Marigold. Rose is killed in the gunfight that develops with the townsmen, and Holly is wounded. Holly and Columbine surrender. They are taken off to jail, with Parsh shepherding Holly and Grey carrying Columbine in his arms.

== Cast ==
- Merry Anders as Holly Dalton
- Lisa Davis as Rose Dalton
- Penny Edwards as Columbine Dalton
- Sue George as Marigold Dalton
- John Russell as W.T. 'Illinois' Grey
- Ed Hinton as Detective Hiram Parsh
- Glenn Dixon as Mr. Slidell
- Johnny Western as Joe
- Malcolm Atterbury as Mr. Sewell
- Douglas Henderson as Bank Cashier
- Kevin Enright as George

== Production ==
Parts of the film were shot in Kanab Canyon, Kanab Creek, and Johnson Canyon in Utah.

== Retrospective appraisal ==
Although director Reginald LeBorg's attitudes towards female filmmakers are distinctly "pre-feminist," in his portrayal of the daughters of a Dalton gang member "he clearly sides with the Dalton women." According to film historian Wheeler W. Dixon, LeBorg champions their quest for "freedom, dignity and independence." The Dalton Girls compares favorably with producer Roger Corman's "Feminist westerns" The Oklahoma Woman (1955) and Gunslinger (1956). Dixon encourages further study of the film.

== Theme ==
"A great deal of narrative tension in the film revolves around the seemingly fluid gender identity of the Dalton girls...forcing us to think about the mutability of identity and the construction of sexuality in the cinematic frame." - Gwendolyn Audrey Foster in The Films of Reginald LeBorg: Interviews, Essays, and Filmography (1992)

Terming The Dalton Girls an "early feminist western," film historian Gwendolyn Audrey Foster argues that it presents a sharply "inverted" portrayal of the conventional male-oriented Hollywood western of the 1950s.

The four women, daughters of the infamous Dalton Gang who died in 1892 in Coffeyville, Kansas bank robbery attempt, adopt the personas and habits of their fathers: robbing banks, raising hell and defying male authority. The Dalton women confound traditional cinematic portrayals of early western women as "civilizing, humanizing influences." Asserting their own "code of conduct," they react to male insults and acts of violence with equal brutality, and as such, they "decenter the rape-revenge narrative." Importantly, the crossing-dressing in which the Dalton girls engage confronts the viewer with "the mutability of gender" and what precisely constitutes "identity." The women's decision to abandon security for equality is depicted with "great sympathy and the risks they incur claiming roles traditionally assigned to males."

Foster surmises "The landscape of the conventional Western cannot 'contain' the outlaw woman of The Dalton Girls. Perhaps that is why the film is a cult classic."
