= Woman in the Dark (1952 film) =

1952 film by George Blair

- Theatrical release poster
- Directed by: George Blair
- Screenplay by: Albert DeMond
- Produced by: Stephen Auer
- Starring: Penny Edwards; Ross Elliott; Rick Vallin; Richard Benedict; Argentina Brunetti; Martin Garralaga
- Cinematography: John MacBurnie
- Edited by: John L. Rice
- Production company: Republic Pictures
- Distributed by: Republic Pictures
- Release date: November 15, 1952
- Running time: 60 minutes
- Country: United States
- Language: English

Woman in the Dark is a 1952 American crime film, directed by George Blair and written by Albert DeMond. The film stars Penny Edwards, Ross Elliott, Rick Vallin, Richard Benedict, Argentina Brunetti and Martin Garralaga. The film was released on November 15, 1952, by Republic Pictures.

== Plot ==
At their parents' 40th-anniversary celebration are the Morello brothers, priest Tony, lawyer Phil and wayward Gino, whose comments offend Phil's new fiancée, Evelyn. Gino wants to join gangster Nick Petzik's organization. Petzik plots a jewel heist, after which Gino's lawyer brother, who represents the insurance company, can be blackmailed into fencing the stolen gems if he doesn't want Gino implicated in the crime.

Anna Reichardt, a young woman in love with Phil, is concerned. After the robbery, and Gino's admission to Phil that he was in on it, Phil decides to turn the tables on the crooks and recover both the jewels and the insurance cash. He neglects Evelyn, who breaks off their engagement. Petzik's thugs gain revenge by shooting Gino, but just when Phil is about to be killed, too, Anna arrives with the police.

== Cast ==
- Penny Edwards as Anna Reichardt
- Ross Elliott as Father Tony Morello
- Rick Vallin as Phil Morello
- Richard Benedict as Gino Morello
- Argentina Brunetti as 'Mama' Morello
- Martin Garralaga as 'Papa' Morello
- Edit Angold as Tante Maria
- Peter Brocco as Nick Petzik
- Barbara Billingsley as Evelyn Courtney
- John Doucette as 'Dutch' Bender
- Richard Irving as 'Slats' Hylan
- Luther Crockett as Police Inspector Johnson
- Carl Thompson as Mickey
- Charles Sullivan as Chuck
