= Missing Women (film) =

1951 film by Philip Ford

- Theatrical release poster
- Directed by: Philip Ford
- Screenplay by: John K. Butler
- Produced by: Stephen Auer
- Starring: Penny Edwards; John Alvin; James Millican; John Gallaudet; James Brown; Robert Shayne
- Cinematography: John MacBurnie
- Edited by: Harold Minter
- Music by: Stanley Wilson
- Production company: Republic Pictures
- Distributed by: Republic Pictures
- Release dates: February 17, 1951 (Rochester, New York); March 8, 1951 (Los Angeles)
- Running time: 60 minutes
- Country: United States
- Language: English

Missing Women is a 1951 Republic Pictures American crime film directed by Philip Ford, written by John K. Butler and starring Penny Edwards, James Millican, John Gallaudet and John Alvin. The film was first screened on February 17, 1951 in Rochester, New York and opened nationwide soon afterward.

== Cast ==
- Penny Edwards as Claudia Rankin
- John Alvin as Eddie Ennis
- James Millican as Hans Soderling
- John Gallaudet as Det. Kelleher
- James Brown as Sgt. Mike Pernell
- Robert Shayne as Cincotta
- Fritz Feld as Pierre
- Marlo Dwyer as May "May Berry" Berringer
- Ralph Sanford as Sam
- John Hedloe as Phillip Rankin
