= Pat Brady (actor) =

American actor (1914–1972)

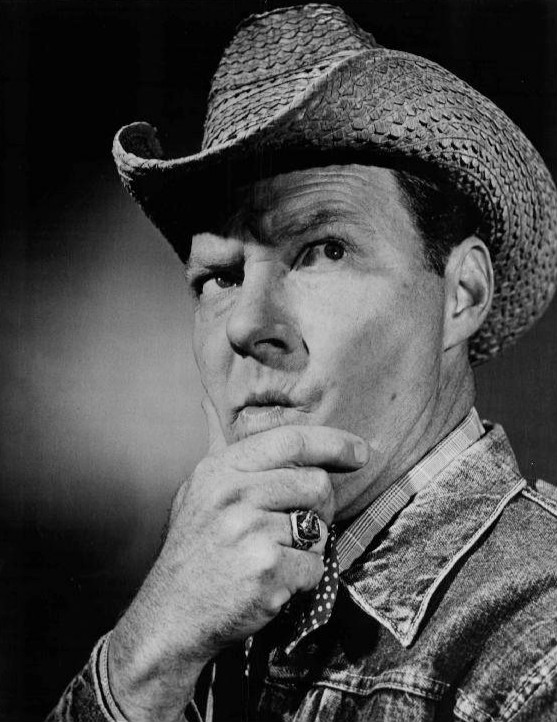
- Born: Robert Ellsworth Patrick Aloysius Brady; December 31, 1914; Toledo, Ohio, U.S.
- Died: February 27, 1972 (aged 57); Green Mountain Falls, Colorado, U.S.
- Other names: Bob Brady
- Occupation(s): Actor, musician

Robert Ellsworth Patrick Aloysius Brady (December 31, 1914 – February 27, 1972) was an American actor and musician best known as the "comical sidekick" of the popular cowboy film and television star Roy Rogers on his eponymous radio and television series.

== Biography ==
Brady was born on December 31, 1914, in Toledo, Ohio. He was the son of John Edward Brady and the former Lucille Brewer. Both parents were in show business. He first appeared on stage at the age of four, in a road-show production of Mrs. Wiggs of the Cabbage Patch. From that initial stage appearance until his death, his life was dedicated to the world of entertainment as a musician and actor, almost exclusively in comedic roles. In 1935, while working as a bassist in California, Pat struck up a friendship with a young country-and-western singer named Leonard Slye, a member of the popular Sons of the Pioneers. When Len Slye was elevated to screen stardom as Roy Rogers, he recommended Brady as his replacement in "The Sons". However, as Bob Nolan, an original member of The Sons, was referred to as "Bob," and The Sons thought one "Bob" was enough, "Bob Brady" then became "Pat Brady".

Making the transition to films in 1937, Brady played comedy relief in several of the Charles Starrett Westerns at Columbia Pictures. In the early 1940s, he moved to Republic, where he played zany camp cook Sparrow Biffle in Roy Rogers films.

Brady served in the U.S. Army and was at the Battle of the Bulge with Patton's Third Army. He was awarded citations and two Purple Hearts.

The Roy Rogers Show radio program had Brady as a regular cast member. When The Roy Rogers Show moved to television Brady played himself from 1951–1957. While most of the others on the show rode horses, Brady at first rode a mule until Rogers decided to have him drive a 1946 CJ-2A Willys Jeep named "Nellybelle." The jeep's bad brakes gave the show one of its catch-phrases; when trying to stop it, Brady would yell "Whoa, Nellybelle!" or "Whoa, Nelly!" Nellybelle was later sold by Christie's for $116,500.

In 1962 Brady provided humor on the musical variety series The Roy Rogers and Dale Evans Show.

== Death ==
Pat Brady died at the age of 57 of a heart attack in Green Mountain Falls, Colorado. At his funeral on March 1, 1972, Hugh Farr and Lloyd Perryman, both members of the Sons of the Pioneers, sang "Tumbling Tumbleweeds" and "At the Rainbows End".

== Selected filmography ==
- Rio Grande (1938)
- West of Cheyenne (1938)
- The Durango Kid (1940)
- Texas Stagecoach (1940)
- Man from Cheyenne (1942)
- Melody Time (1948) as himself
- The Golden Stallion (1949)
- Heldorado (1946) (uncredited)
- Loving You (1957), band member
