= The Roy Rogers and Dale Evans Show =

American musical variety television show

- Starring: Roy Rogers; Dale Evans; Pat Brady; Cliff Arquette
- Country of origin: United States
- Original language: English
- No. of seasons: 1
- No. of episodes: 13

Production
- Producers: Arthur Rush, Ralph Wonders
- Running time: 54 minutes

Original release
- Network: ABC
- Release: September 29 – December 22, 1962

The Roy Rogers and Dale Evans Show was a musical variety series that aired Saturday evenings from 7:30 to 8:30 p.m. on ABC from September 29, 1962 until December 22, 1962.

The series was called "a very wholesome musical variety hour" and one reviewer referred to it as "A kind of Lawrence Welk with spurs." Writers were Borden Chase, Stan Davis, Elon Packard, and Bob Henry. Henry was also the director.

The show became the first series to be cancelled during the 1962 television season.

== Synopsis ==
Besides professional musical and comedy cast members Pat Brady, Sons of the Pioneers, Cliff Arquette, Kirby Buchanon, Cathie Taylor and Ralph Carmichael's orchestra Roy Rogers and Dale Evans also featured their four youngest children: Debbie, Dusty, Sandy and Dodie Rogers.

Each episode had a theme, and several were filmed at various locations, including the Seattle World's Fair, the Marine Corps Air Station El Toro, and San Francisco's Cow Palace. The remaining episodes were filmed at the ABC-TV Center in Hollywood before a live audience.

== Cast ==
- Roy Rogers
- Dale Evans
- Cliff Arquette (as Charley Weaver)
- Pat Brady
- Sons of the Pioneers
- Kirby Buchanon
- Cathie Taylor
- Ralph Carmichael's orchestra
- Debbie, Dusty, Sandy and Dodie Rogers

== Cancellation ==
In November 1962 it was announced that The Roy Rogers and Dale Evans Show was canceled, with its last telecast to be on December 22. The Gallant Men was moved from its Friday night time slot to replace the Saturday evening variety show.

== Episodes ==
| No. | Title | Directed by | Written by | Original release date |
|---|---|---|---|---|
| 1 | "Roy, Dale and the Kids at the Fair" | Bob Henry | Unknown | 29 September 1962 |
The Rogers family attend the Seattle World's Fair and meet Pat Brady, The Sons of the Pioneers, and Cliff Arquette. They listen to Ralph Carmichael and his chorus.
| 2 | "Latin Tempo" | Bob Henry | Unknown | 6 October 1962 |
Music and comedy from south of the border. The Castro Brothers sing and Jose Gonzales-Gonzales provides the humor.
| 3 | "Around the World U.S.A." | Bob Henry | Unknown | 13 October 1962 |
Songs about different countries were sung, plus there were native dancers from Chile and Morocco.
| 4 | "A Western Minstrel" | Bob Henry | Unknown | 20 October 1962 |
George Gobel gives a monologue and Cliff Arquette tells Mount Idy news. Music numbers include Shine On Harvest Moon.
| 5 | "This Is Our Country" | Bob Henry | Unknown | 27 October 1962 |
An episode of songs about different U.S. locations, including Hooray for Hollywood.
| 6 | "Knotts Berry Farm and Ghost Town" | Bob Henry | Unknown | 3 November 1962 |
The Smothers Brothers sing folk songs, and Cliff Arquette plays both a schoolmarm and a prospector.
| 7 | "Western Hit Parade" | Bob Henry | Unknown | 10 November 1962 |
Dale Robertson sings the theme song from High Noon, and Roy sings Empty Saddles, then he and Dale Evans pay tribute to William S. Hart, Tom Mix, Buck Jones and Will Rogers.
| 8 | "Thanksgiving Day Celebration" | Bob Henry | Unknown | 17 November 1962 |
Irene Ryan is Granny, and Cliff Arquette is Grandpa in a holiday skit. Ventriloquist Clifford Guest performs.
| 9 | "Grand National Horse Show" | Bob Henry | Unknown | 24 November 1962 |
Filmed at the Cow Palace, Trigger is a "talking" emcee, and Dale sings I Left My Heart in San Francisco. The Royal Canadian Mounted Police precision riders perform.
| 10 | "Minstrel Show" | Bob Henry | Unknown | 1 December 1962 |
Edgar Bergen performs with 3 ventriloquist's dummies.
| 11 | "Roy, Dale and the Kids at the Circus" | Bob Henry | Unknown | 8 December 1962 |
Clowns and performing animals are featured. Martha Raye promotes Billy Rose's Jumbo.
| 12 | "Roy, Dale and the Kids at El Toro" | Bob Henry | Unknown | 15 December 1962 |
This tribute to the armed forces was filmed at Marine Corps Air Station El Toro.
| 13 | "Home for Christmas" | Bob Henry | Unknown | 22 December 1962 |
The Lennon Sisters sing Christmas music, and Fran Allison and Cliff Arquette provide additional entertainment.
