= Sloan Nibley =

American screenwriter

- Born: Alexander Sloan Nibley; June 23, 1908; Portland, Oregon, U.S.
- Died: April 3, 1990 (aged 81); Los Angeles, California, U.S.
- Other name: A. Sloan Nibley
- Occupation: Screenwriter
- Years active: 1947–1973
- Spouse: Linda Stirling (1946 - April 3, 1990)

Alexander Sloan Nibley (June 23, 1908 – April 3, 1990) was an American screenwriter. He was the older brother of famed Latter Day Saint scholar Hugh Nibley.

== Career ==
Born in Portland, Oregon to Alexander ("El") and Agnes "Sloanie" Nibley,

Nibley served in the Navy in New York in 1945 before beginning his career.

Nibley served as screenwriter for over twenty films including Springfield Rifle, Carson City, the remake of The Golden Stallion, and Eyes of Texas (1948), a film starring Roy Rogers. He also wrote for numerous TV series, including Sea Hunt, Sky King, Wagon Train, and The Addams Family.

== Personal life and death ==
Nibley married actress Linda Stirling in 1946 with whom he had two children, Chris and Tim. He died on April 3, 1990, in Los Angeles, California.

== Selected filmography ==
Film
Year	Film	Notes
1947	On the Old Spanish Trail	
1948 1948	Eyes of Texas Night Time in Nevada	Credited as A. Sloan Nibley
1949	Susanna Pass	
1950	Twilight in the Sierras	
1951	Pals of the Golden West	Story
1952	Springfield Rifle	Story
1952	Carson City	Screenplay
1956	Thunder Over Arizona	
1961	Fury River	Two episodes of Northwest Passage edited into a feature film
1967	Hostile Guns	Story and screenplay
Television
Year	Title	Notes
1954–1955	The Adventures of Kit Carson	3 episodes
1955–1956	Science Fiction Theatre	3 episodes
1956	Judge Roy Bean	1 episode
1957	Tales of Wells Fargo	1 episode
1957	Whirlybirds	2 episodes
1958–1959	Northwest Passage	3 episodes
1960	Rawhide	1 episode
1960	The Millionaire	1 episode
1960	Have Gun – Will Travel	1 episode
1960	Naked City	1 episode
1961	Bachelor Father	1 episode
1963–1970	Death Valley Days	3 episodes
1964–1965	The Famous Adventures of Mr. Magoo	4 episodes
1973	Yogi's Gang	3 episodes
