= Roy Rogers =

American singer and actor (1911–1998)

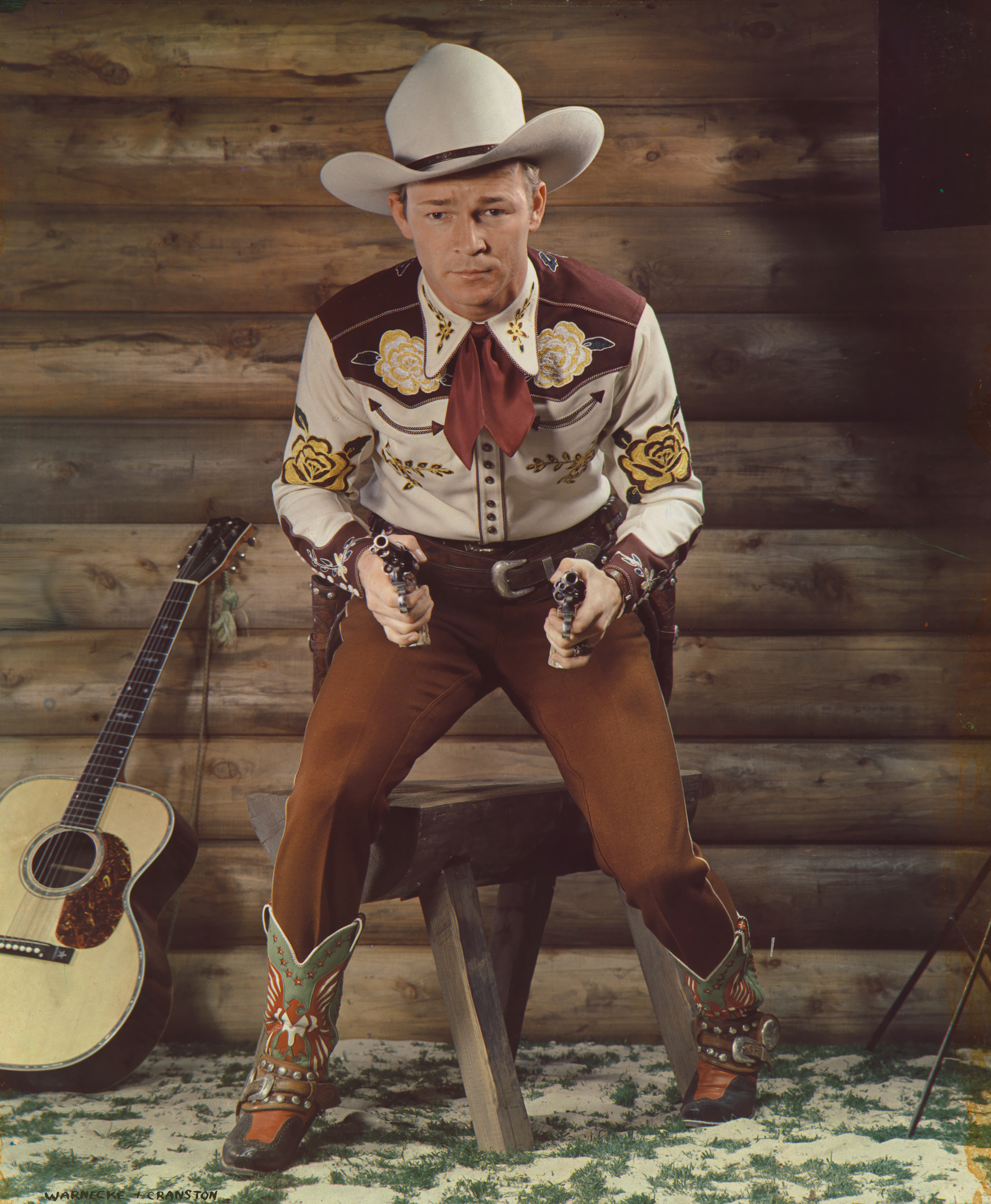
- Roy Rogers in 1942
- Born: Leonard Franklin Slye; November 5, 1911; Cincinnati, Ohio, US
- Died: July 6, 1998 (aged 86); Apple Valley, California, US
- Resting place: Sunset Hills Memorial Park, Apple Valley; 34.5569916°N 117.1429367°W
- Other name: Len Slye
- Occupations: Singer; actor; TV host; rodeo performer
- Years active: 1934–1998
- Style: Western
- Political party: Republican
- Spouses: Lucile Ascolese (m. 1933; div. 1936) Grace Arline Wilkins (m. 1936; died 1946) Dale Evans (m. 1947)
- Children: 8

Roy Rogers (born Leonard Franklin Slye; November 5, 1911 – July 6, 1998), nicknamed the King of the Cowboys, was an American actor, singer, television host, and rodeo performer.

Following early work under his given name, first as co-founder of the Sons of the Pioneers and then as an actor, the rebranded Rogers became one of the most famous and popular Western stars of his era.

He appeared in almost 90 motion pictures, as well as numerous episodes of his self-titled radio program that lasted nine years. From 1951 to 1957, he hosted The Roy Rogers Show television series. In many of them, he appeared with his wife, Dale Evans; his horse, Trigger; and his dog, Bullet. Rogers is also remembered for the signature song Dale Evans wrote entitled "Happy Trails".

His early roles were uncredited parts in films by fellow singing cowboy Gene Autry. His productions usually featured a sidekick, often either Pat Brady, Andy Devine, George "Gabby" Hayes, or Smiley Burnette.

Rogers was the only country singer to be inducted twice into the Country Music Hall of Fame. He is the recipient of four stars on the Hollywood Walk of Fame, one of which is for Sons of the Pioneers.

In his later years, he lent his name to the franchise chain of Roy Rogers Restaurants.

== Early life ==
Rogers was born Leonard Franklin Slye, the son of Mattie (née Womack) and Andrew "Andy" Slye in Cincinnati, Ohio. The family lived in a tenement on 2nd Street, where Riverfront Stadium was later constructed. (Rogers later joked that he was born at second base.) Len had three sisters: Kathleen, Mary, and Cleda. Dissatisfied with his job and city life, Andy and his brother Will built a 12-by-50-foot (3.7 m × 15.2 m) houseboat from salvage lumber, and in July 1912 the Slye family traveled up the Ohio River towards Portsmouth. Desiring a more stable existence in Portsmouth, they purchased land on which they planned to build a house, but instead the Great Flood of 1913 enabled them to move the houseboat onto their property and continue living in it on dry land.

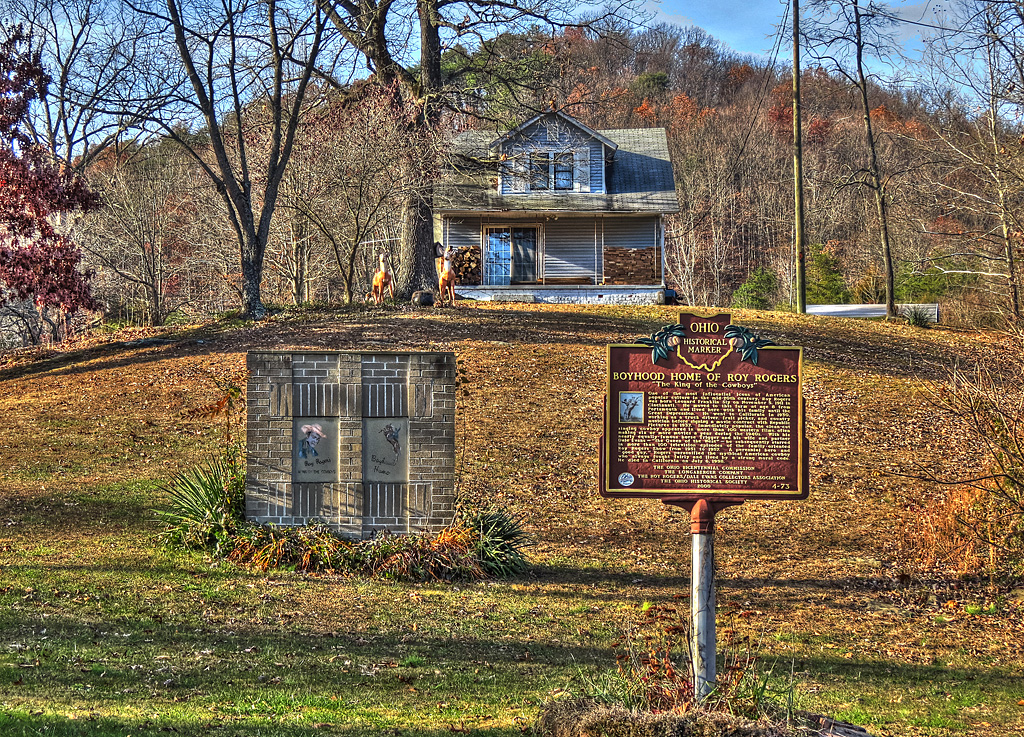
Rogers's boyhood home at Duck Run, near Lucasville, Ohio

In 1919, the Slye family purchased a farm in Duck Run, near Lucasville, Ohio, about 12 miles (19 km) north of Portsmouth, and built a six-room house. Andy soon realized that the farm alone would not provide sufficient income for his family, so he took a job at a Portsmouth shoe factory, living in Portsmouth during the week and returning home on weekends, bearing gifts following paydays. A notable gift was a horse on which young Len learned the basics of horsemanship. Living on the farm with no radio, the family made their own entertainment. On Saturday nights, they often invited neighbors over for square dances, during which Len would sing, play mandolin, and call the square dances. He also learned to yodel during this time, and with his mother they would use different yodels to communicate with each other across distances on the farm.

Len attended high school in McDermott, Ohio, but after he completed his second year there, his family returned to Cincinnati, where his father worked at another shoe factory. Realizing that his family needed his financial help, Len quit school and joined his father at the factory. He tried to attend night school, but after being ridiculed for falling asleep in class, he quit school and never returned.

By 1929, after his older sister Mary and her husband had moved to Lawndale, California, Len and his father quit their factory jobs, packed up their 1923 Dodge, and drove the family to California to visit Mary. They stayed for four months before returning to Ohio. Soon after returning, Len had the opportunity to travel again to California with Mary's father-in-law, and the rest of the family followed in the spring of 1930. The Slye family rented a small house near Mary, and Len and his father found employment driving gravel trucks for a highway construction project.

In spring 1931, after the construction company went bankrupt, Len traveled to Tulare, California, where he found work picking peaches for Del Monte. During this time, he lived in a labor camp similar to those depicted in John Steinbeck's novel The Grapes of Wrath. The economic hardship of the Great Depression was just as severe in California as it was in Ohio.

== Career ==
=== Music career ===
After 19-year-old Len's return to Lawndale, his sister Mary suggested that he audition for the Midnight Frolic radio program, which was broadcast over KMCS in Inglewood. A few nights later, wearing a Western shirt that Mary had made for him, he overcame his shyness and appeared on the program playing guitar, singing, and yodeling. A few days later, he was asked to join a local country music group, the Rocky Mountaineers. He accepted the group's offer and became a member in August 1931.

By September 1931, Len hired the Canadian-born Bob Nolan, who answered the group's classified ad in the Los Angeles Herald-Examiner that read, "Yodeler for old-time act, to travel. Tenor preferred." Nolan stayed with the group only a short time, but Len and he stayed in touch. Nolan was replaced by Tim Spencer.

In the spring of 1932, Len, Spencer, and another singer, Slumber Nichols, left the Rocky Mountaineers to form a trio, which soon failed. Throughout that year, Len and Spencer moved through a series of short-lived groups, including the International Cowboys and the O-Bar-O Cowboys. When Spencer left the O-Bar-O Cowboys to take a break from music, Len joined Jack LeFevre and His Texas Outlaws, who were a popular act on a local Los Angeles radio station.

In early 1933, Len, Nolan, and Spencer formed the Pioneers Trio, with Slye on guitar, Nolan on string bass, and Spencer as lead vocalist. They rehearsed for weeks refining their vocal harmonies. During this time, Len continued to work with his radio singing group, while Spencer and Nolan began writing songs for the trio. In early 1934, the fiddle player Hugh Farr joined the group, adding a bass voice to their vocal arrangements. Later that year, the Pioneers Trio became the Sons of the Pioneers when a radio station announcer changed their name because he felt they were too young to be pioneers. The name was received well and fit the group, which was no longer a trio.

By summer 1934, the popularity and fame of the Sons of the Pioneers extended beyond the Los Angeles area and quickly spread across the country through short syndicated radio segments that were later rebroadcast across the United States. The Sons of the Pioneers signed a recording contract with the newly founded Decca label and made their first commercial recording on August 8, 1934. One of the first songs recorded during that first session was "Tumbling Tumbleweeds", written by Bob Nolan. Over the next two years, the Sons of the Pioneers recorded 32 songs for Decca, including the classic "Cool Water".

=== Film career ===
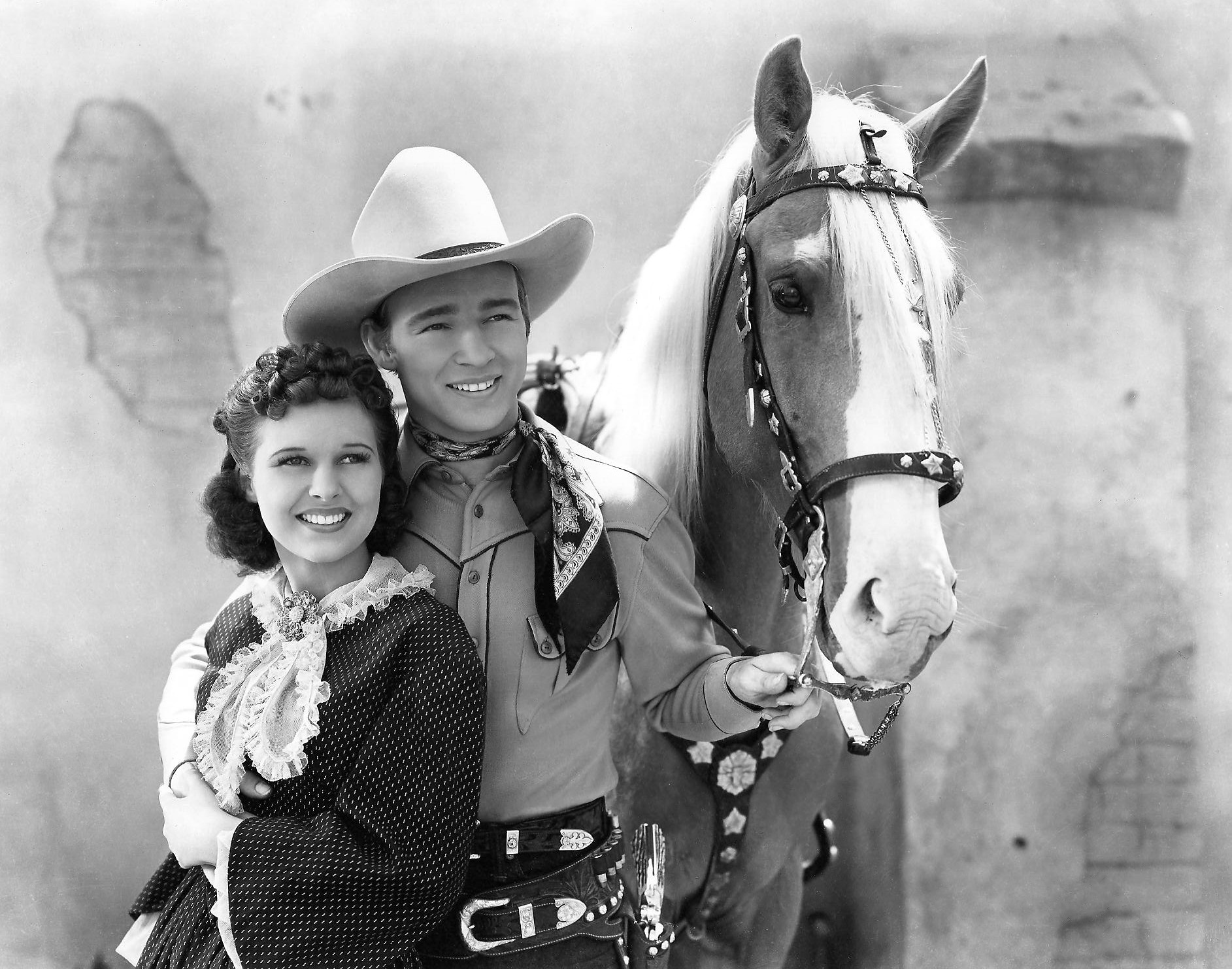
Lynne Roberts and Rogers in Billy the Kid Returns, 1938

From his first film appearance in 1935, Len worked steadily in Western films, including a large supporting role as a singing cowboy while still billed as Leonard Slye in a Gene Autry movie. In 1938, Autry demanded more money for his work, so there was a competition for a new singing cowboy (whom they could pay less). Many singers sought the job, including Willie Phelps of the Phelps brothers, who appeared in early Western movies. Len ended up winning the contest and was given the stage name Roy Rogers by Republic Pictures, suggesting the western-sounding name Roy and combining it with the surname of the popular western comic entertainer Will Rogers.

He was assigned the leading role in Under Western Stars. He became a matinee idol, a competitor with Autry as the nation's favorite singing cowboy. In addition to his own movies, he played a supporting role in the John Wayne classic Dark Command (1940), which also featured one of his future sidekicks, George "Gabby" Hayes. He became a major box-office attraction. Unlike other stars, the vast majority of his leading roles allowed him to play a character with his own name, in the manner of Autry.

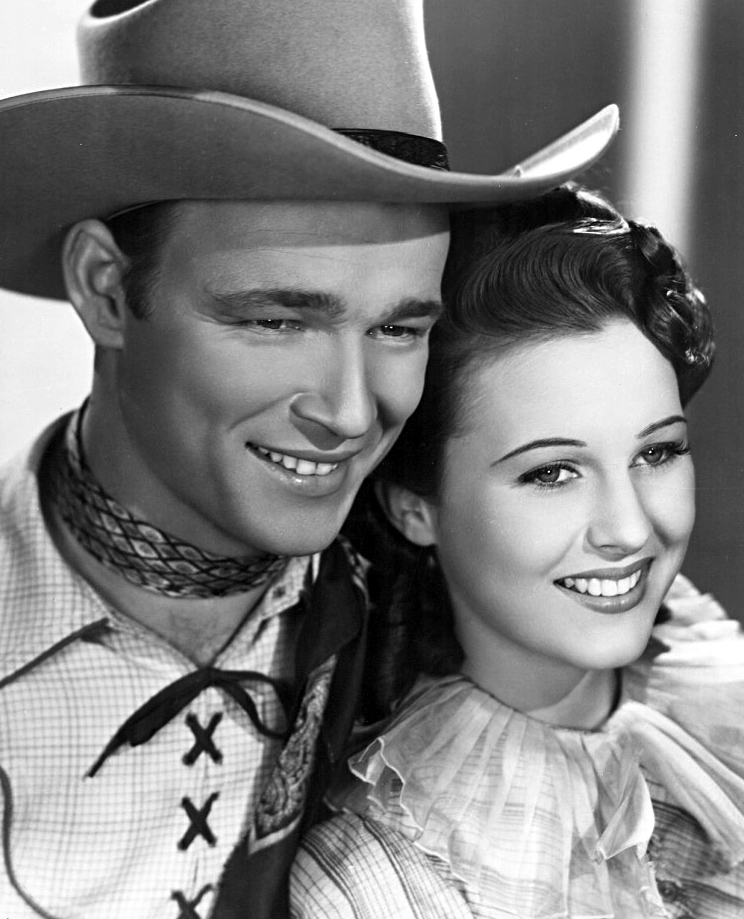
Publicity photo of Rogers and Mary Hart for Shine On, Harvest Moon, 1938

In the Motion Picture Herald Top Ten Money-Making Western Stars poll, Rogers was listed for 16 consecutive years, from 1939 to 1954, holding first place from 1943 to 1954 until the poll ceased. He appeared in the similar BoxOffice poll from 1938 to 1955, holding first place from 1943 to 1952. In the final three years of that poll, he was second only to Randolph Scott. These two polls are only an indication of the popularity of series stars, but Rogers also appeared in the Top Ten Money Making Stars Poll of all films in 1945 and 1946.

Rogers was an idol for many children through his films and television shows. Most of his postwar films were in Trucolor during an era when almost all other B westerns were black and white. Some of his movies would segue into animal adventures, in which his horse, Trigger, would go off on his own for a while with the camera following him.

With money from Rogers's films and from his public appearances going to Republic Pictures, he brought a clause into his 1940 contract with the studio where he would have the right to his likeness, voice, and name for merchandising. There were Roy Rogers action figures, cowboy adventure novels, and playsets, as well as a comic strip, a long-lived Dell Comics comic book series (Roy Rogers Comics) written by Gaylord Du Bois, and a variety of marketing successes. Rogers was second only to Walt Disney in the number of items featuring his name.

The Sons of the Pioneers continued their popularity and have not stopped performing from the time Rogers started the group, replacing members as they retired or died (all original members are dead). Although he was no longer an active member, they often appeared as his backup group in films, radio, and television, and he would occasionally appear with them in performances up until his death.

He met Dale Evans in 1944 when they were cast in a film together. They were well known as advocates for adoption and as founders and operators of children's charities. They adopted several children. Both were outspoken Christians throughout their marriage. Beginning in 1949, they were part of the Hollywood Christian Group, founded by their friend, Louis Evans Jr., the organizing pastor of Bel Air Church. The group met in Henrietta Mears's home and later in the home of Evans and Colleen Townsend, after their marriage. Billy Graham and Jane Russell were also part of this group. In 1956, the Hollywood Christian Group became Bel Air Church.

In Apple Valley, California, where they later made their home, streets, highways, and civic buildings have been named after them in recognition of their efforts on behalf of homeless and handicapped children. In 1967 Rogers established the Roy Rogers-Dale Evans Museum there. Rogers was also an active Freemason and a Shriner and was noted for his support of their charities.

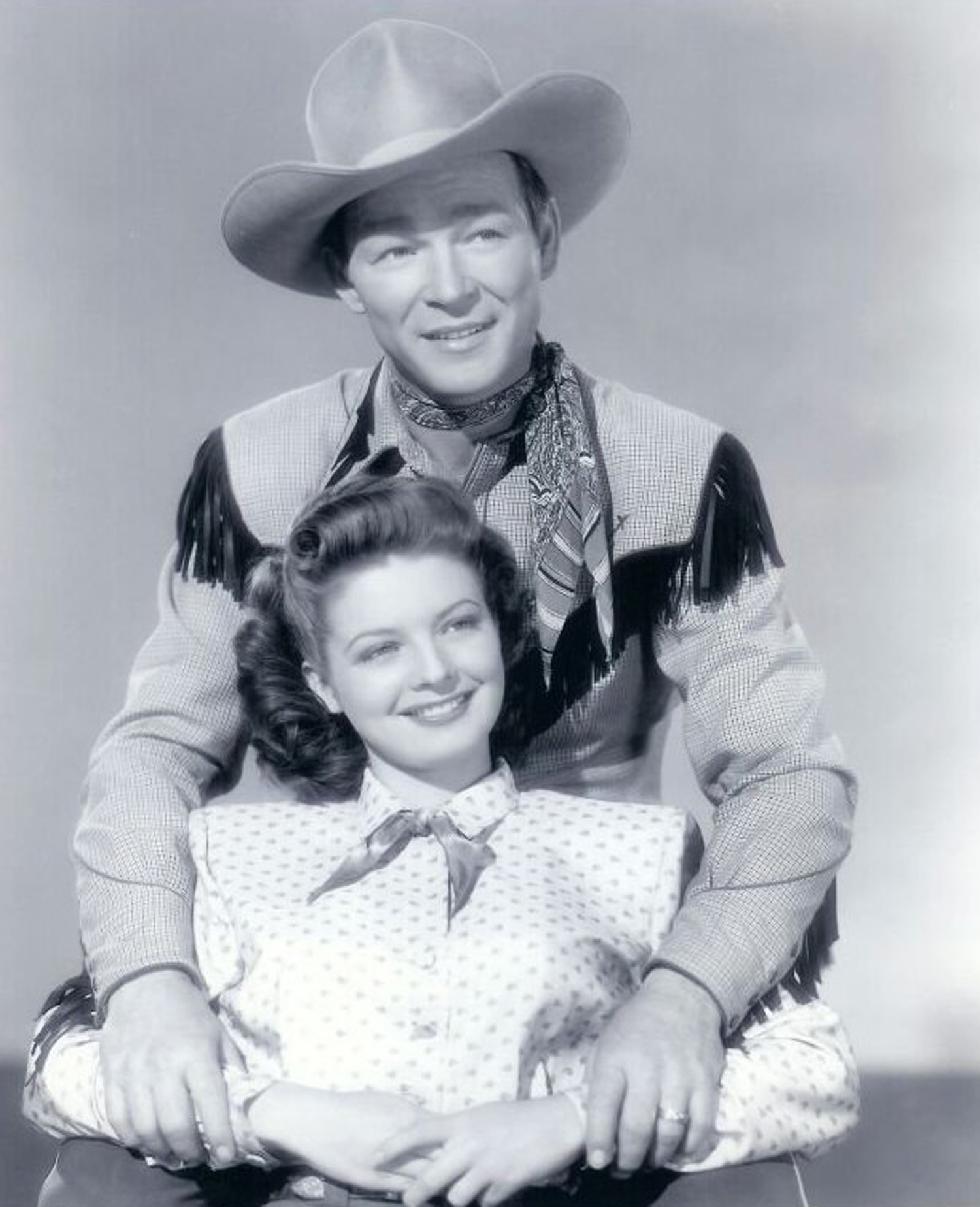
Publicity photo of Rogers and Gail Davis, 1948

Rogers and Evans' famous theme song, "Happy Trails", was written by Evans; they sang it as a duet to sign off their television show. In fall 1962, they cohosted a comedy-Western-variety program, The Roy Rogers and Dale Evans Show, aired on ABC. It was canceled after three months, losing in the ratings to The Jackie Gleason Show on CBS. Rogers made numerous appearances on television, starring as himself or other cowboy-types, including an episode of Wonder Woman, and he starred in two episodes of The Fall Guy that were written around him in the mid-1980s.

Rogers owned a Hollywood production company, which produced his TV series. It also filmed the 1955–1956 CBS Western series Brave Eagle.

In 1968, Rogers licensed his name to the Marriott Corporation, which converted its Hot Shoppes restaurants into Roy Rogers Restaurants, with which he otherwise had no involvement.

Rogers returned to Lubbock in 1970 to headline the Texas Tech University Intercollegiate Rodeo with Evans. In 1975, his last motion picture, Macintosh and T.J. was filmed at the 6666 Ranch in King County, 90 miles east of Lubbock and near the O- Bar-O Ranch in Kent County.

== Personal life ==
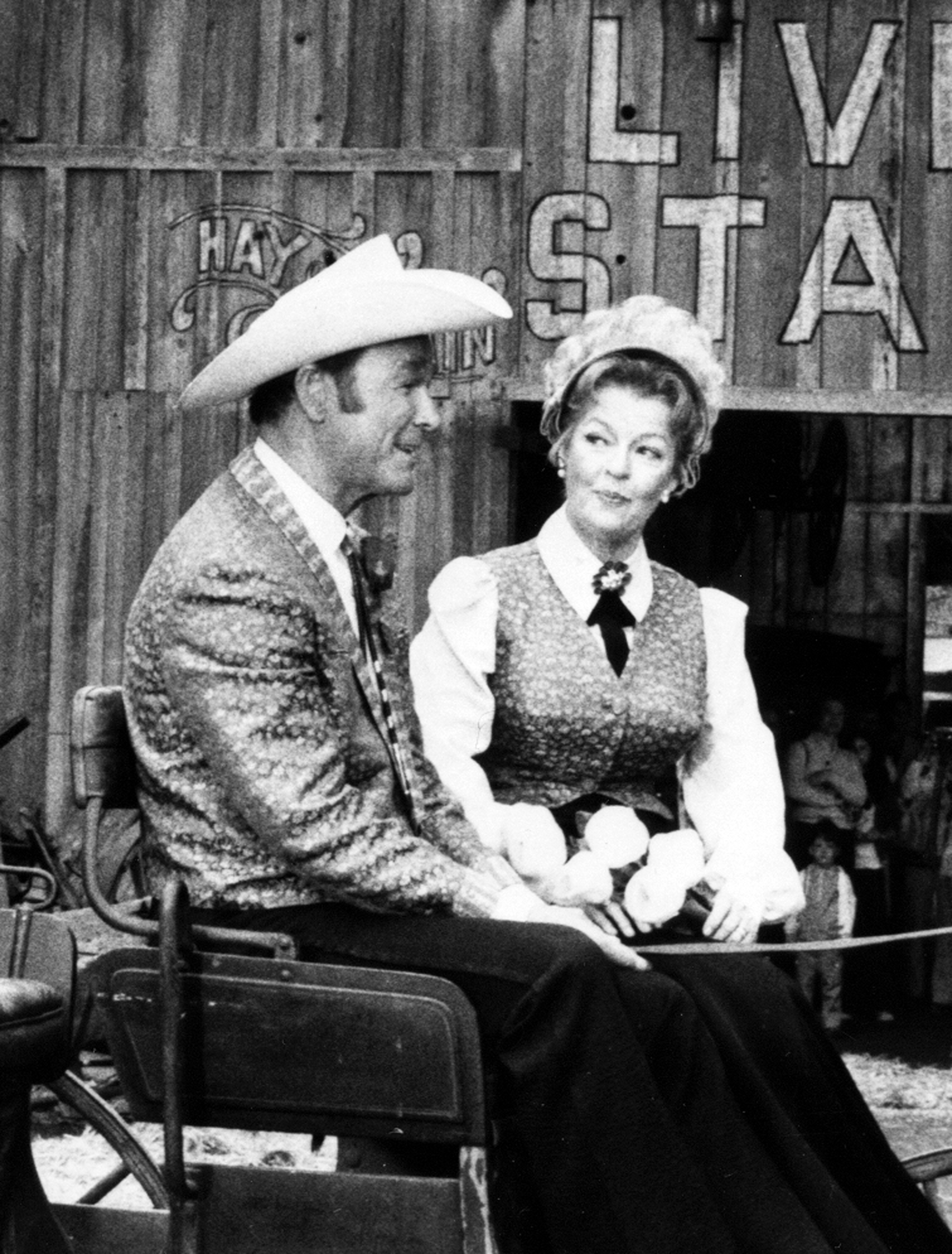
Rogers and Dale Evans at Knott's Berry Farm in the 1970s

In 1934, a palomino colt foaled in California was named "Golden Cloud"; when Rogers acquired him, he renamed him Trigger. Rogers also owned a thoroughbred racehorse named Triggairo, that won 13 career races, including the 1975 El Encino Stakes at Santa Anita Park.

Rogers met 19 year old Lucile Ascolese in 1932. After dating for a year they married on May 8th, 1933. After three years they divorced in June 1936.

Rogers had been on tour with the O-Bar-O Cowboys in June 1933, and while they were performing in Roswell, New Mexico, a caller to a radio station, Grace Arline Wilkins, promised Rogers that she would bake him a pie if he sang "The Swiss Yodel". They were married in Roswell on June 11, 1936, having corresponded since their first meeting. In 1941, the couple adopted a daughter, Cheryl Darlene. Two years later, Grace gave birth to daughter Linda Lou. A son, Roy Jr. ("Dusty"), was born in 1946; Grace died of complications from the birth a few days later, on November 3.

Rogers met Dale Evans in 1944, when they were cast in a film together. They fell in love soon after Grace's death, and Rogers proposed to her during a rodeo at Chicago Stadium. They married on New Year's Eve in 1947 at the Flying L Ranch in Davis, Oklahoma, where they had filmed Home in Oklahoma a few months earlier. Together they had a child and adopted four more: Robin Elizabeth, who had Down syndrome and died of complications of mumps shortly before her second birthday; three adopted daughters, Mimi, Dodie, and Debbie; and one adopted son, Sandy. Evans wrote about the loss of their daughter Robin in her book Angel Unaware. Rogers and Evans remained married until his death.

In 1955, Rogers and Evans purchased a 168-acre (68 ha) ranch near Chatsworth, California, complete with a hilltop ranch house, expanding it to 300 acres (121 ha).

After their daughter Debbie was killed in a church bus accident in 1964, they moved to the 67-acre (27 ha) Double R Bar Ranch in Apple Valley, California.

Rogers was a Freemason and a member of Hollywood (California) Lodge No. 355, the Scottish Rite Valley of Los Angeles, and Al Malaikah Shrine Temple. He was awarded the honorary 33rd degree of the Scottish Rite in 1975.

Rogers was raised in a religious household and was a churchgoer from childhood, but he and his wife, Dale Evans, became more openly active spokespeople for their Christian faith later in life, following Rogers' conversion. Joining the Protestant Episcopal Church and participating in Billy Graham crusades, they promoted Christian messages in their shows and public appearances from the 1950s onward.

He was also a pilot, and owned a Cessna Bobcat.

Rogers supported Barry Goldwater in the 1964 United States presidential election.

=== Death ===
Rogers died of congestive heart failure on July 6, 1998, aged 86, in Apple Valley, California. He was buried at Sunset Hills Memorial Park in Apple Valley, as was his wife Dale Evans three years later.

== Honors and awards ==
On April 22, 1958, Ohio School of the Air's "Ohio Today" segment broadcast his dramatized biography "Roy Rogers, King of the Cowboys", co-aired by 12 radio stations across Ohio.

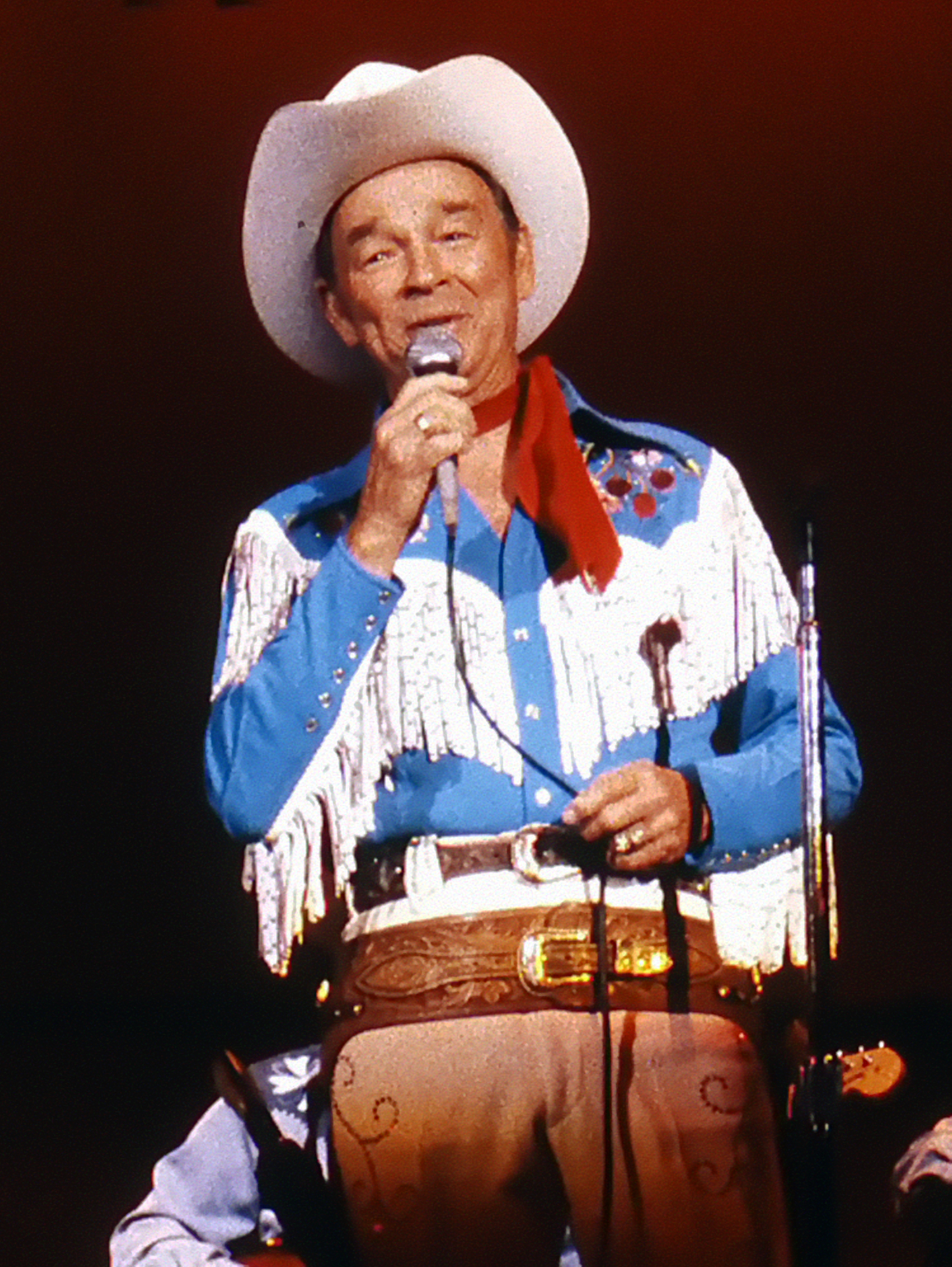
Rogers performing at Knott's Berry Farm

On February 8, 1960, Rogers was honored with three stars on the Hollywood Walk of Fame: for Motion Pictures at 1752 Vine Street, for Television at 1620 Vine Street, and for Radio at 1733 Vine Street. In 1983, he was awarded the Golden Boot Award, and in 1996, he received the Golden Boot Founder's Award.

In 1967, Rogers, with Choctaw blood on his mother's side, was named outstanding Indian citizen of the year by a group of Western tribes.

In 1976, Rogers and Evans were inducted into the Western Performers Hall of Fame at the National Cowboy & Western Heritage Museum in Oklahoma City, Oklahoma, and in 1995 was inducted again as a founding member of the Sons of the Pioneers.

Rogers received recognition from the State of Arkansas, appointed by the governor with an Arkansas Traveler certificate.

Rogers was also twice elected to the Country Music Hall of Fame, first as a member of the Sons of the Pioneers in 1980, and as a soloist in 1988. In 2018, he was inducted to the National Multicultural Western Heritage Museum. As of August 2022, he was the only person elected to the Country Music Hall of Fame twice. In 2001, a Golden Palm Star on the Palm Springs, California, Walk of Stars was dedicated to him and Dale Evans.

Rogers' cultural influence is reflected in numerous songs, including "If I Had a Boat" by Lyle Lovett, "Roy Rogers" by Elton John on his 1973 album Goodbye Yellow Brick Road, and "Should've Been a Cowboy" by Toby Keith. Rogers himself makes an appearance in the music video for the song "Heroes and Friends" by Randy Travis. Rogers is referenced in numerous films, including Die Hard (1988) in which the Bruce Willis character John McClane used the pseudonym "Roy" and remarks, "I was always kinda partial to Roy Rogers actually." In the television series American Dad!, the character Roger uses "Roy Rogers" as a pseudonym in the episode "Roy Rogers McFreely". In the movie City Slickers, the Jack Palance character Curly sings the song "Tumbling Tumbleweeds" while the Billy Crystal character Mitch is playing the harmonica.

== Filmography ==
- Slightly Static (1935) as member of Sons of the Pioneers (uncredited)
- The Old Homestead (1935) as Len, member of Sons of the Pioneers (credited as Len Slye)
- Way Up Thar (1935) as band member (credited as Len Slye)
- Gallant Defender (1935) as guitar-playing Nester (uncredited)
- The Mysterious Avenger (1936) as musician Len (credited as Len Slye)
- Song of the Saddle (1936) as guitarist with Sons of the Pioneers (uncredited)
- When I Yoo Hoo (1936) as vocal (voice, uncredited)
- Rhythm on the Range (1936) as Leonard with Sons of the Pioneers (uncredited)
- California Mail (1936) as square dance caller (uncredited)
- The Big Show (1936) as guitarist with Sons of the Pioneers (uncredited)
- The Old Corral (1936) as Buck O'Keefe (uncredited)
- Egghead Rides Again (1937) as yodeling specialty (voice, uncredited)
- The Old Wyoming Trail (1937) as guitar player, singer, cowhand Len (uncredited)
- Wild Horse Rodeo (1937) as singer (credited as Dick Weston)
- The Old Barn Dance (1938) as singer (credited as Dick Weston)
- Under Western Stars (1938) as himself
- The Isle of Pingo Pongo (1938) as specialty yodeling (voice, uncredited)
- Billy the Kid Returns (1938) as Roy Rogers and Billy the Kid
- A Feud There Was (1938) as Elmer Fudd (singing voice, uncredited)
- Come On, Rangers (1938) as himself
- Shine On, Harvest Moon (1938) as himself
- Rough Riders' Round-up (1939) as himself
- Southward Ho (1939) as Roy
- Frontier Pony Express (1939) as Roy Rogers, Pony Express rider
- In Old Caliente (1939) as himself
- Wall Street Cowboy (1939) as himself
- The Arizona Kid (1939) as Roy Rogers The Arizona Kid
- Jeepers Creepers (1939) as Sheriff Roy Rogers
- Saga of Death Valley (1939) as himself
- Days of Jesse James (1939) as himself
- Dark Command (1940) as Fletch McCloud
- Young Buffalo Bill (1940) as Bill Cody
- The Carson City Kid (1940) as Carson City Kid
- The Ranger and the Lady (1940) as Texas Ranger Captain Roy Colt
- Colorado (1940) as Lieutenant Jerry Burke
- Young Bill Hickok (1940) as Bill Hickok
- The Border Legion (1940) as Dr. Stephen Kellogg, aka Steve Kells
- Robin Hood of the Pecos (1941) as Vance Corbin
- Arkansas Judge (1941) as Tom Martel
- In Old Cheyenne (1941) as Steve Blane
- Sheriff of Tombstone (1941) as Brett Starr
- Nevada City (1941) as Jeff Connors
- Bad Man of Deadwood (1941) as Brett Starr aka Bill Brady
- Jesse James at Bay (1941) as Jesse James and Clint Burns
- Red River Valley (1941) as himself
- Man from Cheyenne (1942) as himself
- South of Santa Fe (1942) as himself
- Sunset on the Desert (1942) as Roy Rogers and Bill Sloan
- Romance on the Range (1942) as himself
- Sons of the Pioneers (1942) as himself
- Sunset Serenade (1942) as himself
- Heart of the Golden West (1942) as himself
- Ridin' Down the Canyon (1942) as himself
- Idaho (1943) as himself
- King of the Cowboys (1943) as himself
- Song of Texas (1943) as himself
- Silver Spurs (1943) as himself
- The Man from Music Mountain (1943) as himself
- Hands Across the Border (1944) as himself
- Cowboy and the Senorita (1944) as himself
- The Yellow Rose of Texas (1944) as himself
- Song of Nevada (1944) as himself
- San Fernando Valley (1944) as himself
- Lights of Old Santa Fe (1944) as himself
- Brazil (1944) as himself
- Hollywood Canteen (1944) as himself
- Lake Placid Serenade (1944) as himself
- Utah (1945) as himself
- Bells of Rosarita (1945) as himself
- The Man from Oklahoma (1945) as himself
- Along the Navajo Trail (1945) as himself
- Sunset in El Dorado (1945) as himself
- Don't Fence Me In (1945) as himself
- Song of Arizona (1946) as himself
- Rainbow Over Texas (1946) as himself
- My Pal Trigger (1946) as himself
- Under Nevada Skies (1946) as himself
- Roll on Texas Moon (1946) as himself
- Home in Oklahoma (1946) as himself
- Out California Way (1946) as himself
- Heldorado (1946) as Nevada State Ranger Roy Rogers
- Apache Rose (1947) as himself
- Hit Parade of 1947 (1947) as himself
- Bells of San Angelo (1947) as himself
- Springtime in the Sierras (1947) as himself
- On the Old Spanish Trail (1947) as himself
- The Gay Ranchero (1948) as himself
- Under California Stars (1948) as himself
- Melody Time (1948) as himself
- Eyes of Texas (1948) as himself
- Night Time in Nevada (1948) as himself
- Grand Canyon Trail (1948) as himself
- The Far Frontier (1948) as himself
- Susanna Pass (1949) as himself
- Down Dakota Way (1949) as himself
- The Golden Stallion (1949) as himself
- Bells of Coronado (1950) as himself
- Twilight in the Sierras (1950) as State Parole Officer Roy Rogers
- Trigger, Jr. (1950) as himself
- Sunset in the West (1950) as himself
- North of the Great Divide (1950) as himself
- Trail of Robin Hood (1950) as himself
- Spoilers of the Plains (1951) as himself
- Heart of the Rockies (1951) as himself
- In Old Amarillo (1951) as himself
- South of Caliente (1951) as himself
- Pals of the Golden West (1951) as Border Patrolman Roy Rogers
- Son of Paleface (1952) as Roy Barton
- Alias Jesse James (1959) as himself (uncredited)
- Mackintosh and T.J. (1975) as Mackintosh
- Wonder Woman (1977) as J.P. Hadley, season 1, episode 12
- The Muppet Show (1979) as himself
- The Fall Guy (1983 and 1984) as himself

== Box office ranking ==
For a number of years exhibitors voted Rogers among the most popular stars in the country:

- 1942 – 2nd most popular Western star (following Gene Autry)
- 1943 – most popular Western star
- 1944 – 24th most popular star in the US; most popular Western star
- 1945 – most popular Western star; 10th most popular star
- 1946 – 10th most popular star in the US; most popular Western star
- 1947 – 12th most popular star in the US; most popular Western star
- 1948 – 17th most popular star in the US; most popular Western star
- 1949 – 18th most popular star in the US; most popular Western star
- 1950 – 19th (US); most popular Western star
- 1951 – most popular Western star
- 1952 – most popular Western star (for the 10th year in a row)

== Discography ==
=== Charted albums ===
Year	Title	Chart peak		Label
Year	Title	US Country	US	Label
1970	The Country Side of Roy Rogers	40	—	Capitol
1971	A Man from Duck Run	34	—	Capitol
1975	Happy Trails to You	35	—	20th Century
1991	Tribute	17	113	RCA

=== Charted singles ===
Year	Title	Chart peak		Album
Year	Title	US Country	CAN Country	Album
1946	"A Little White Cross on the Hill"	7	—	Singles only
1947	"My Chickashay Gal"	4	—	Singles only
1948	"Blue Shadows on the Trail" (Roy Rogers and the Sons of the Pioneers)	6	—	Singles only
1948	"(There'll Never Be Another) Pecos Bill" (Roy Rogers and the Sons of the Pioneers)	13	—	Singles only
1950	"Stampede"	8	—	Singles only
1970	"Money Can't Buy Love"	35	—	The Country Side of Roy Rogers
1971	"Lovenworth"	12	33	A Man from Duck Run
1971	"Happy Anniversary"	47	—	A Man from Duck Run
1972	"These Are the Good Old Days"	73	—	Single only
1974	"Hoppy, Gene and Me"^{A}	15	12	Happy Trails to You
1980	"Ride Concrete Cowboy, Ride" (Roy Rogers and the Sons of the Pioneers)	80	—	Smokey & the Bandit II (soundtrack)
1991	"Hold on Partner" (w/ Clint Black)	42	48	Tribute

- ^{A}"Hoppy, Gene and Me" also peaked at number 65 on the Billboard Hot 100 and number 38 on the RPM Adult Contemporary Tracks chart in Canada.

=== Music videos ===
Year	Title	Director
1991	"Hold on Partner" (with Clint Black)	Jack Cole

== Popular songs recorded by Rogers ==
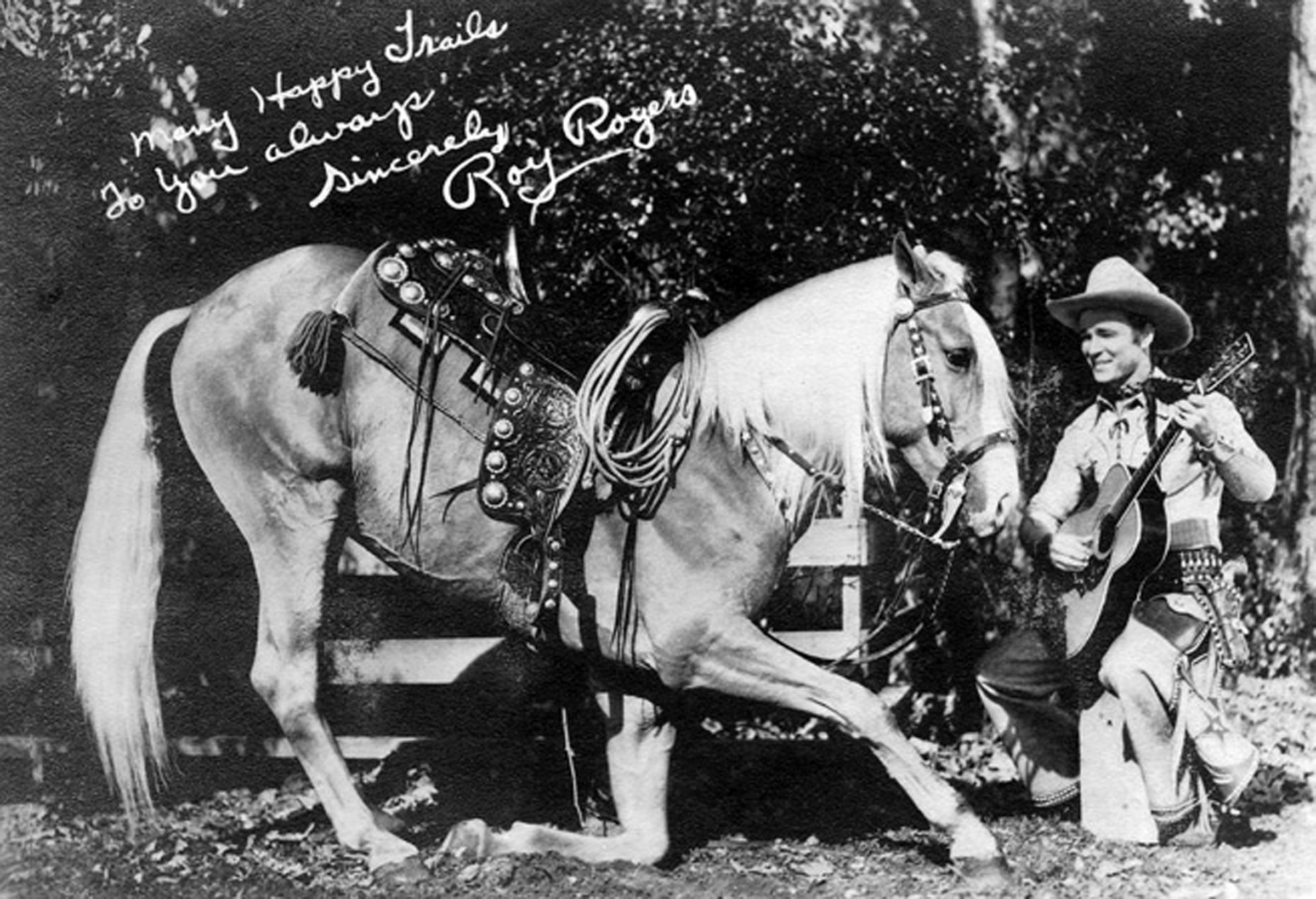
Publicity photo of Rogers and Trigger

- "Don't Fence Me In"
- "Hold That Critter Down"
- "Little White Cross on the Hill"
- "One More Ride"
- "Ride Ranger Ride"
- "That Pioneer Mother of Mine"
- "Tumbling Tumbleweeds"
- "Way Out There" (singing and yodeling)
- "Why, Oh Why, Did I Ever Leave Wyoming?"
- "Hold On Partner" (duet with Clint Black)
- "Happy Trails"
- "The Bible Tells Me So"

== See also ==
- Dale Evans
- Trigger (horse)
- Buttermilk (horse)
- Smiley Burnette
- Pat Brady
- Andy Devine
- George "Gabby" Hayes
- Roy Rogers Restaurants
- Roy Rogers cocktail
- Earl W. Bascom, cowboy artist who worked with Rogers
