= Riders of the Purple Sage (band) =

Name of several American bands

Riders of the Purple Sage was a name used by three separate western bands in the United States. These bands also inspired the naming of a fourth band playing in a more psychedelic country style, the New Riders of the Purple Sage. The name originally came from the title of Zane Grey's very popular 1912 novel Riders of the Purple Sage.

== Formation of the three bands ==
The first "Riders of the Purple Sage" band was formed by Jack Dalton in 1932. It existed for approximately two years in the Los Angeles area.

Another "Riders of the Purple Sage" was formed in 1936 by singer and guitarist Buck Page. With Page on the East Coast and Dalton on the West Coast, and because Page was a child when the Dalton "Riders" were playing, it is uncertain if either knew of each other's band. Page's group spent three years as the staff band for radio station KDKA in Pittsburgh, performing five hour-long shows each week. In 1938 the band went to New York City and performed on radio station WOR and at various venues such as the famous nightclub called the Village Barn. They brought the name and Western three part harmony to the Country on Coast to Coast radio. Military service then interrupted their careers during World War II.

A third band known as "Riders of the Purple Sage" was organized in California, by Foy Willing, a radio DJ and singer from Texas, while Buck Page and his "Riders" were in the military. Willing's band performed in several movies during the 1940s and had a string of hit recordings. In June 1946, the "All-Star Western Theatre" made its debut over the CBS Pacific Network starring Cottonseed Clark and Foy Willing and the Riders of the Purple Sage. Originating at KNX, the CBS flagship station based at Columbia Square in the heart of Hollywood, the series enjoyed two years of popularity - first on CBS and then, in 1948, moving to KHJ and the Mutual Radio Network. It disbanded in 1952. Page's earlier Riders of the Purple Sage is often incorrectly credited with the film appearances and recordings by Willing's band, according to Page's manager Gary Bright.

== Reorganization in California and 2003 incarnation ==
In the early 1960s, Page, who relocated to California in the aftermath of World War II, once again organized his "Riders of the Purple Sage" band. This band released three CDs and toured the cowboy festival circuit until c. 2003 when Page disbanded it again.

The latest incarnation of the group was first called "Foy Willing's Riders of the Purple Sage." It was formed in 2003 (with the encouragement of Willing's widow Sharon Willing) by former members of Buck Page's "Riders", and currently plays mostly in Southern California. The band is fronted by Cody Bryant (Vocals, Guitar, Banjo, Mandolin). He is joined by another past employee of Page, Mike Ley (Vocals, Guitar, Mandolin, Harmonicas), Evan Marshall (Vocals, Mandolin, Fiddle), Jimmy Harris (Vocals, Bass), and Landon McCoy (Drums)—although the personnel often change for live concerts.
