= Border Saddlemates =

1952 film by William Witney

- Theatrical release poster
- Directed by: William Witney
- Screenplay by: Albert DeMond
- Produced by: Edward J. White
- Starring: Rex Allen; Mary Ellen Kay; Slim Pickens; Roy Barcroft; Forrest Taylor; Jimmy Moss
- Cinematography: John MacBurnie
- Edited by: Harold Minter
- Music by: Stanley Wilson
- Production company: Republic Pictures
- Distributed by: Republic Pictures
- Release date: April 15, 1952
- Running time: 67 minutes
- Country: United States
- Language: English

Border Saddlemates is a 1952 American Western film directed by William Witney, written by Albert DeMond and starring Rex Allen, Mary Ellen Kay, Slim Pickens, Roy Barcroft, Forrest Taylor and Jimmy Moss. The film was released on April 15, 1952 by Republic Pictures.

== Cast ==
- Rex Allen as Dr. Rex Allen
- Koko as Koko
- Mary Ellen Kay as Jane Richards
- Slim Pickens as Slim Pickens
- Roy Barcroft as Steve Baxter
- Forrest Taylor as Mel Richards
- Jimmy Moss as Danny Richards
- Zon Murray as Matt Lacey
- Keith McConnell as Constable Gene Dalton
- Mark Hanna as Manero
- The Republic Rhythm Riders as Musicians
