= South Pacific Trail =

1952 film by William Witney

- Theatrical release poster
- Directed by: William Witney
- Screenplay by: Arthur E. Orloff
- Based on: The Great Train Robbery; 1941 film by Joseph Kane
- Produced by: Edward J. White
- Starring: Rex Allen; Estelita Rodriguez; Slim Pickens; Nestor Paiva; Roy Barcroft; Douglas Evans
- Cinematography: John MacBurnie
- Edited by: Harold Minter
- Music by: Stanley Wilson
- Production company: Republic Pictures
- Distributed by: Republic Pictures
- Release date: October 20, 1952
- Running time: 60 minutes
- Country: United States
- Language: English

South Pacific Trail is a 1952 American Western film directed by William Witney, written by Arthur E. Orloff, and starring Rex Allen, Estelita Rodriguez, Slim Pickens, Nestor Paiva, Roy Barcroft and Douglas Evans. It was released on October 20, 1952, by Republic Pictures.

== Cast ==
- Rex Allen as Rex Allen
- Koko as Rex's Horse
- Estelita Rodriguez as Lita Alvarez
- Slim Pickens as Slim Pickens
- Nestor Paiva as Carlos Alvarez
- Roy Barcroft as Link Felton
- Douglas Evans as Rodney Brewster
- Joe McGuinn as Henchman Ace
- Forrest Taylor as Train Conductor
- The Republic Rhythm Riders as Cowhands
