= The Last Bandit =

1949 film by Joseph Kane

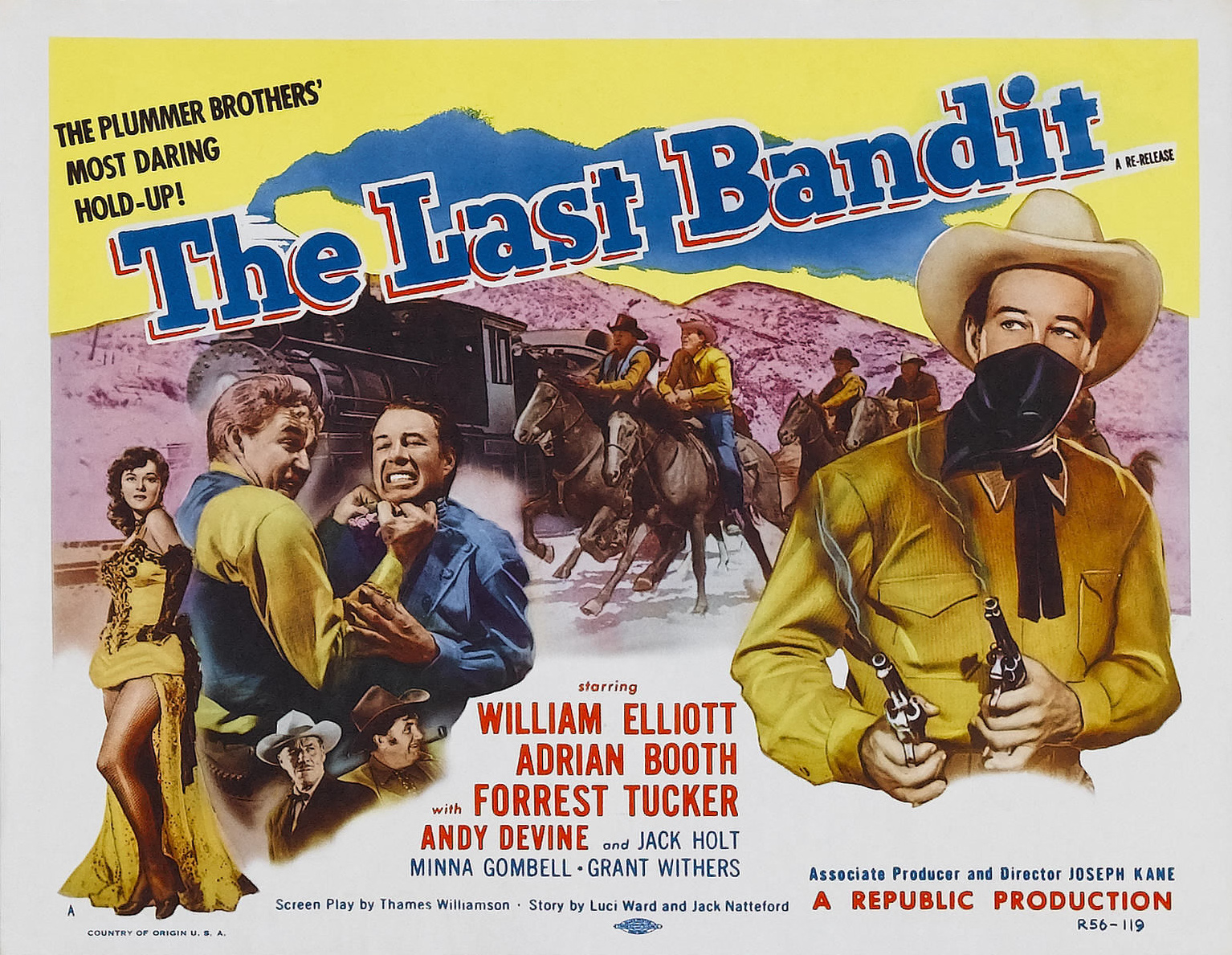
- Directed by: Joseph Kane
- Written by: Thames Williamson; Luci Ward; Jack Natteford
- Based on: The Great Train Robbery; 1941 film by Joseph Kane
- Produced by: Joseph Kane
- Starring: Wild Bill Elliott; Lorna Gray; Forrest Tucker; Andy Devine
- Cinematography: Jack A. Marta
- Edited by: Arthur Roberts
- Music by: R. Dale Butts
- Color process: Trucolor
- Production company: Republic Pictures
- Distributed by: Republic Pictures
- Release date: February 25, 1949
- Running time: 80 minutes
- Country: United States
- Language: English

The Last Bandit is a 1949 American Western film directed by Joseph Kane and starring Bill Elliott, Lorna Gray and Forrest Tucker. It was a remake by Republic Pictures of the 1941 film The Great Train Robbery with a larger budget and using the studio's Trucolor process. The film was remade again in 1952 as South Pacific Trail.

== Plot ==
Frank Norris, now working as a railroad detective, is implicated in an attempt by his former outlaw colleagues to rob a series of gold shipments.

== Partial cast ==
- Wild Bill Elliott as Frank Norris / Frank Plummer
- Lorna Gray as Kate Foley / Kate Sampson
- Forrest Tucker as Jim Plummer
- Andy Devine as Casey Brown
- Jack Holt as Mort Pemberton
- Minna Gombell as Winnie McPhail
- Grant Withers as Ed Bagley
- Virginia Brissac as Kate's Mother
- Louis Faust as Hank Morse
- Stanley Andrews as Jeff Baldwin
- Martin Garralaga as Patrick Moreno
- Joseph Crehan as Local No. 44 Engineer
- Charles Middleton as Blindfolded Circuit Rider

== Bibliography ==
- Fetrow, Alan G. Feature Films, 1940-1949: a United States Filmography. McFarland, 1994.
