= Susanna Pass =

1949 film by William Witney

- Directed by: William Witney
- Written by: Sloan Nibley; John K. Butler
- Produced by: Edward J. White
- Starring: Roy Rogers
- Cinematography: Reggle Lanning
- Edited by: Tony Martinelli
- Music by: R. Dale Butts; Nathan Scott; Stanley Wilson
- Distributed by: Republic Pictures
- Release date: April 29, 1949
- Running time: 67 Minutes
- Country: United States
- Language: English

Susanna Pass is a 1949 Republic Pictures Trucolor American Western film directed by William Witney and starring Roy Rogers.

== Cast ==
- Roy Rogers as himself
- Dale Evans as Kay 'Doc' Parker
- Estelita Rodriguez as Rita
- Martin Garralaga as Carlos
- Robert Emmett Keane as Martin Master, Newspapers editor
- Lucien Littlefield as Russell Masters
- Douglas Fowley as Roberts aka Walter P. Johnson
- David Sharpe as Henchmen Vince
- Robert Bice as Bob Oliver
