= Pals of the Golden West =

1951 film by William Witney

- Directed by: William Witney
- Written by: Albert DeMond; Eric Taylor; Sloan Nibley
- Produced by: Edward J. White
- Starring: Roy Rogers; Dale Evans; Estelita Rodriguez
- Cinematography: Jack A. Marta
- Edited by: Harold Minter
- Production company: Republic Pictures
- Distributed by: Republic Pictures
- Release date: November 15, 1951
- Running time: 68 minutes
- Country: United States
- Language: English

Pals of the Golden West is a 1951 American Western film starring Roy Rogers, Dale Evans and Estelita Rodriguez. It was produced and distributed by Republic Pictures and is the last of a long-running series featuring Rogers.

== Cast ==
- Roy Rogers as Border Patrolman Roy Rogers
- Trigger as Trigger
- Dale Evans as Cathy Marsh
- Estelita Rodriguez as Elena Madera
- Pinky Lee as Photographer Pinky Lee
- Anthony Caruso as Lucky Grillo aka Jim Bradford
- Roy Barcroft as Ward Sloan
- Eduardo Jiminez as Pancho Lopez
