= Eyes of Texas (film) =

1948 film by William Witney

- Directed by: William Witney
- Written by: Sloan Nibley
- Produced by: Edward J. White
- Starring: Roy Rogers; Lynne Roberts; Andy Devine
- Cinematography: Jack A. Marta
- Edited by: Tony Martinelli
- Music by: R. Dale Butts
- Production company: Republic Pictures
- Distributed by: Republic Pictures
- Release date: July 15, 1948
- Running time: 70 minutes
- Country: United States
- Language: English

Eyes of Texas is a 1948 American Western film shot in Trucolor directed by William Witney and starring Roy Rogers.

== Plot ==
Kindly Thad Cameron runs a ranch for boys whose fathers were killed in World War II. The ranch is named in the memory of his nephew and last surviving family member Frank Cameron who was killed in Italy.

Thad's attorney Hattie Waters informs Thad that his nephew has been found alive after being cured of amnesia. Unfortunately, the real Frank remains dead as the scheming Hattie recruits a former convict to impersonate Frank. After tricking Thad to create a new will leaving all his fortune to Frank, she sets a pack of trained-to-kill dogs onto Thad with everyone believing Thad was killed by a pack of wolves.

U.S. Marshal Roy Rogers with the help of Dr. Cookie Bullfincher and his nurse Penny Thatcher investigate the matter to bring justice where and to whom it is due.

== Cast ==
- Roy Rogers as U.S. Marshal Roy Rogers
- Trigger as Trigger, Roy's Horse
- Lynne Roberts as Nurse Penny Thatcher
- Andy Devine as Dr. Cookie Bullfincher
- Nana Bryant as Hattie E. Waters, Attorney
- Roy Barcroft as Hattie's Henchman Vic Rabin
- Danny Morton as Frank Dennis / Frank Cameron
- Francis Ford as Thad Cameron
- Pascale Perry as Pete - Henchman with whip
- Stanley Blystone as Sheriff
- Bob Nolan as Bob
- Pat Brady as Pat
- Sons of the Pioneers as Musicians

== Soundtrack ==
- Roy Rogers and the Sons of the Pioneers - "Texas Trails" (Written by Tim Spencer)
- Roy Rogers and the Sons of the Pioneers - "Padre of Old San Antone" (Written by Tim Spencer)
- The Sons of the Pioneers - "Graveyard Filler of the West" (Written by Tim Spencer)
