= Bells of Coronado =

1950 film by William Witney

- Theatrical release poster
- Directed by: William Witney
- Written by: Sloan Nibley
- Produced by: Edward J. White
- Starring: Roy Rogers; Trigger; Dale Evans
- Cinematography: John MacBurnie
- Edited by: Tony Martinelli
- Music by: R. Dale Butts
- Production company: Republic Pictures
- Distributed by: Republic Pictures
- Release date: December 21, 1949
- Running time: 67 minutes
- Country: United States
- Language: English

Bells of Coronado is a 1950 American Trucolor Western film directed by William Witney starring Roy Rogers and Dale Evans.

== Plot ==
The owner of the El Coronado mine is ambushed on the road into town by thieves, who steal a wagon full of uranium ore. The owner is found by linemen of the Coronado Light and Power Company, but dies at the town's doctor's office before regaining consciousness.

The insurance company that has insured the ore hires Roy to determine whether the wagon accidentally left the roadway and if the ore fell into the Coronado Dam reservoir. With the help of the town's doctor, Roy takes a job as a lineman with the power company,

The thieves try to steal a second wagon load of uranium, but Roy gives chase and is able to wrest the ore from the thieves. The thieves steal the second load of ore after it had been taken to the warehouse. Roy discovers that the uranium will be delivered to a dry lake bed where a foreign government will land an airplane to collect it. Roy has to rush to stop the plane from departing with the uranium.

== Cast ==
- Roy Rogers as Roy Rogers
- Trigger as Roy's Horse
- Dale Evans as Pam Reynolds
- Pat Brady as Sparrow Biffle
- Grant Withers as Craig Bennett
- Leo Cleary as Dr. Frank Harding
- Clifton Young as Ross
- Robert Bice as Jim Russell
- Stuart Randall as Sheriff
- John Hamilton as Mr. Linden, Insurance Company Official
- Edmund Cobb as Rafferty
- Eddie Lee as Shanghai, the Cook
- Rex Lease as Shipping Company Foreman
- Lane Bradford as Shipping smuggler
- Foy Willing as Foy
- Riders of the Purple Sage as Power Co. Linemen / Musicians

== Production ==
Production began on August 1, 1949 and was completed within the month.

== Soundtrack ==
- "Save a Smile for a Rainy Day" (written by Sid Robin and Foy Willing)
- "Got No Time for the Blues" (written by Sid Robin and Foy Willing)
- "Bells of Coronado" (written by Sid Robin and Foy Willing, Spanish lyrics by Aaron González)

== Reception ==
A contemporary review in the Democrat and Leader of Davenport, Iowa noted: "Roy is his own charming, ingenuous self ... The appeal of this particular picture is heightened by the presence of Rogers' wife, the former Dale Evans, his leading lady in some 20-odd Republic westerns before their marriage broke up their screen partnership."
