= Twilight in the Sierras =

1950 film

- Theater poster with top billing given to Rogers and his horse Trigger, 1950
- Directed by: William Witney
- Written by: Sloan Nibley
- Produced by: Edward J. White
- Starring: Roy Rogers; Trigger; Dale Evans; Estelita Rodriguez; Pat Brady
- Cinematography: John MacBurnie
- Edited by: Tony Martinelli
- Music by: Stanley Wilson
- Production company: Republic Pictures
- Distributed by: Republic Pictures
- Release date: March 22, 1950
- Running time: 67 minutes
- Country: United States
- Language: English

Twilight in the Sierras is a 1950 American Trucolor Western film directed by William Witney and starring Roy Rogers, Dale Evans, Estelita Rodriguez and Pat Brady.

== Plot ==
Ricardo Chavez is a convicted counterfeiter who is released on parole after serving time in a California prison and works on a ranch as he begins his post-incarceration life. Ricardo is soon abducted by a gang of outlaws and blackmailed to engrave printing plates to produce counterfeit currency for Matt Brunner, the gang's leader. Brunner presents himself in public as the owner of a Morongo Valley hunting lodge. Although Ricardo now wants to pursue an honest life and forget his criminal past, Brunner threatens to harm or kill his sister Lola if he refuses to do the illegal work. Roy Rogers is Ricardo's parole officer, and with the help of female deputy sheriff Pat Callahan, Roy uncovers the counterfeiting operation while clearing himself of a false murder charge, saving Ricardo and Lola and defeating the gang.

== Cast ==
- Roy Rogers as State Parole Officer Roy Rogers
- Trigger as Trigger, Roy's horse
- Dale Evans as Deputy Sheriff Pat Callahan
- Estelita Rodriguez as Lola Chavez
- Pat Brady as Dr. Sparrow Bliffle DVM
- Russ Vincent as Ricardo Chavez
- George Meeker as Matt Brunner
- Fred Kohler, Jr. as Mason, Brunner henchman
- Edward Keane as Judge Wiggins
- House Peters Jr. as Jim Williams
- Pierce Lyden as Blake, Brunner henchman
- Don Frost as bartender
- Joseph A. Garro as Brunner henchman
- William F. Leicester as Clifford (as William Lester)
- Foy Willing as Foy
- Harry Strang as Sheriff Callahan (uncredited)

== Production ==
Twilight in the Sierras was filmed between mid-September and early October 1949.

The film marks the sixth of nine appearances of actress Estelita Rodriguez in Roy Rogers' films.

As in some of Rogers' earlier films and later on his weekly television show, Twilight in the Sierras is thematically and stylistically an anachronistic blend of Hollywood's portrayal of the West of the 1870s with contemporary America of the 1940s-1950s, including modern conveniences such as electric lights, telephones and radios, motor vehicles. In its 1950 review of the film, Variety noted this selective blending of the old with the new, describing the film's plot as "a curious mixture of modern gangsterism in wild west dress which the kids most likely won't mind or even notice".

== Reception ==
In a contemporary review, Variety wrote:

"Twilight in the Sierras" is a standard Roy Rogers pic slanted at the juve action trade. All the ingredients are used in this oatuner, which boasts a better-than-usual score. But the kiddies will go for the hard-riding, rootin'-tootin' yarn, which keeps the characters galloping from start to finish. Trucolor tinting adds to the production values despite the overall untrue reproduction of facial and landscape hues. ... Rogers is as standard as the script, getting a good assist from Dale Evans, as the daughter of the local sheriff; his hoss, Trigger, and the Riders of the Purple Sage vocal group. Top songs include "It's One Wonderful Day" and "Rootin', Tootin' Cowboy" with Estelita Rodriguez, as a visiting Cuban gal, neatly handling "Pancho's Rancho".

Motion Picture Daily commented: "Roy Rogers gives his fans just about everything in this Trucolor Western complete with perfect hero, dastardly villains, much suspense, a mountain lion and singing cowboys."
