= Trial Without Jury =

1950 film by Philip Ford

- Directed by: Philip Ford
- Written by: Albert DeMond; Lawrence L. Goldman; Rose Simon Kohn
- Produced by: Stephen Auer
- Starring: Robert Rockwell; Barbra Fuller; Kent Taylor
- Cinematography: John MacBurnie
- Edited by: Harold Minter
- Music by: Stanley Wilson
- Production company: Republic Pictures
- Distributed by: Republic Pictures
- Release date: July 8, 1950
- Running time: 60 minutes
- Country: United States
- Language: English

Trial Without Jury is a 1950 American mystery film directed by Philip Ford and starring Robert Rockwell, Barbra Fuller and Kent Taylor.

The film's sets were designed by the art director Frank Hotaling.

== Cast ==
- Robert Rockwell as Police Lt. Bill Peters
- Barbra Fuller as Corinne Hollister
- Kent Taylor as Jed Kilgore
- Audrey Long as Myra Peters
- K. Elmo Lowe as John Webb
- Stanley Waxman as Arthur Gentry
- John Whitney as Riley Wentworth
- Barbara Billingsley as Rheta Mulford
- Ruthelma Stevens as Mrs. Mannings
- William Grueneberg as Detective Turner
- Christine Larson as Bernice Andrews - Myra's Secretary
- James Craven as Producer
- William Haade as Kennedy - Truck Driver
- Bill Baldwin as Parkson - Airport Ticket Agent
- Theodore von Eltz as Philip Mannings
- Sidney Marion as Shuffalong

== Bibliography ==
- Pierce, David. Motion Picture Copyrights & Renewals, 1950-1959. Milestone, 1989.
