= Belle of Old Mexico =

1950 film by R. G. Springsteen

- Directed by: R. G. Springsteen
- Written by: Bradford Ropes; Francis Swann
- Produced by: Edward J. White
- Starring: Estelita Rodriguez; Robert Rockwell; Dorothy Patrick; Thurston Hall
- Cinematography: Jack A. Marta
- Edited by: Harold Minter
- Music by: Stanley Wilson
- Production company: Republic Pictures
- Distributed by: Republic Pictures
- Release dates: March 1, 1950 (New York City); March 24, 1950 (United States)
- Running time: 70 minutes
- Country: United States
- Language: English

Belle of Old Mexico is a 1950 American Trucolor comedy film directed by Robert G. Springsteen and starring Estelita Rodriguez, Robert Rockwell and Dorothy Patrick. The film was successful at the box office, and Republic Pictures hoped to transform Rodriguez into a star similar to Lupe Vélez.

== Plot ==
An American World War II veteran fulfills a promise that he had made to a dying comrade by going to Mexico to adopt the dead man's daughter. However, the daughter is not a child but an attractive young woman. He faces difficulty convincing his fiancée and employers that the relationship is entirely innocent.

== Cast ==
- Estelita Rodriguez as Rosita Dominguez
- Robert Rockwell as Kip Armitage III
- Dorothy Patrick as Deborah Chatfield
- Thurston Hall as Horatio Huntington
- Florence Bates as Nellie Chatfield
- Dave Willock as Tommy Mayberry
- Gordon Jones as Tex Barnet
- Fritz Feld as Doctor Quincy
- Anne O'Neal as Mrs. Abercrombie
- Nacho Galindo as Pico
- Joe Venuti as Joe Venuti
- Edward Gargan as Sam
- Carlos Molina and His Orchestra

== Bibliography ==
- Rainey, Buck. Sweethearts of the Sage: Biographies and Filmographies of 258 actresses appearing in Western movies. McFarland & Company, 1992.
