= Women from Headquarters =

1950 film

- Directed by: George Blair
- Written by: Gene Lewis
- Produced by: Stephen Auer
- Starring: Virginia Huston; Barbra Fuller; Frances Charles
- Cinematography: John MacBurnie
- Edited by: Harold Minter
- Music by: R. Dale Butts; Stanley Wilson
- Production company: Republic Pictures
- Distributed by: Republic Pictures
- Release date: May 1, 1950
- Running time: 60 minutes
- Country: United States
- Language: English

Women from Headquarters is a 1950 American crime film directed by George Blair and starring Virginia Huston, Barbra Fuller and Frances Charles. The plot concerns a former Army nurse who trains as an officer with the Los Angeles Police Department.

The film's sets were designed by the art director James W. Sullivan.

== Cast ==
- Virginia Huston as Joyce
- Barbra Fuller as Ruby
- Frances Charles as Ann Rogers
- Robert Rockwell as Gates
- Norman Budd as Max Taylor
- K. Elmo Lowe as Police Captain Parr
- Otto Waldis as Joe Calla
- Grandon Rhodes as Richard Cott
- Jack Kruschen as Sam
- Bert Conway as Leo Pawley
- Marlo Dwyer as Bessie Collier
- Sidney Marion as Drunk Customer
- John De Simone as 2nd Drunk
- Gil Herman as Police Captain Brady
- Leonard Penn as Police Officer Allen
- Luther Crockett as Police Chief

== Bibliography ==
- Philippa Gates. Detecting Women: Gender and the Hollywood Detective Film. SUNY Press, 2011.
