= Under Nevada Skies =

1946 film by Frank McDonald

- Directed by: Frank McDonald
- Written by: Paul Gangelin; J. Benton Cheney; M. Coates Webster
- Produced by: Edward J. White
- Starring: Roy Rogers; Dale Evans; George 'Gabby' Hayes
- Cinematography: William Bradford
- Edited by: Edward Mann
- Music by: R. Dale Butts
- Production company: Republic Pictures
- Distributed by: Republic Pictures
- Release date: August 26, 1946
- Running time: 69 minutes
- Country: United States
- Language: English

Under Nevada Skies is a 1946 American Western film directed by Frank McDonald and starring Roy Rogers, Dale Evans and George "Gabby" Hayes. It was produced and distributed by Republic Pictures.

== Cast ==
- Roy Rogers as himself
- Trigger as Roy's Horse
- George 'Gabby' Hayes as Gabby Whittaker
- Dale Evans as Helen Williams
- Douglas Dumbrille as Courtney
- Leyland Hodgson as Tom Craig
- Tris Coffin as Dan Adams
- Rudolph Anders as Alberti
- LeRoy Mason as Henchman Marty
- George Lynn as Henchman Hoffman
- Bob Nolan as Bob
- Sons of the Pioneers as Musical Group
