= Down Laredo Way =

1953 film by William Witney

- Directed by: William Witney
- Written by: Gerald Geraghty
- Produced by: Rudy Ralston
- Starring: Rex Allen; Dona Drake; Slim Pickens
- Cinematography: John MacBurnie
- Edited by: Harold Minter
- Music by: Stanley Wilson
- Production company: Republic Pictures
- Distributed by: Republic Pictures
- Release date: August 5, 1953
- Running time: 54 minutes
- Country: United States
- Language: English

Down Laredo Way is a 1953 American Western film directed by William Witney and starring Rex Allen, Dona Drake and Slim Pickens.

The film's art direction was by Frank Arrigo.

== Cast ==
- Rex Allen as Rex Allen
- Koko as Koko, Rex's Horse
- Slim Pickens as Slim
- Dona Drake as Narita
- Marjorie Lord as Valerie
- Roy Barcroft as Cooper
- Judy Nugent as Taffy Wells
- Percy Helton as Judge Sully
- Clayton Moore as Chip Wells
- Zon Murray as Joe, the Fake Deputy
- Kay Riehl as Doll Woman

== Bibliography ==
- Pitts, Michael R. Western Movies: A Guide to 5,105 Feature Films. McFarland, 2012.
