= The Flying Jalopy =

1943 Donald Duck cartoon

- Theatrical release poster
- Directed by: Dick Lundy
- Produced by: Walt Disney
- Starring: Clarence Nash; Nestor Paiva
- Animation by: Bob Carlson; Bill Melendez; Art Babbitt
- Production company: Walt Disney Productions
- Distributed by: RKO Radio Pictures, Inc.
- Release date: March 12, 1943
- Running time: 7 minutes
- Country: United States
- Language: English

The Flying Jalopy is a 1943 animated short film featuring Donald Duck. It was released by Walt Disney Productions.

== Plot ==
Donald goes to a "used" plane lot run by Ben Buzzard takes one of the junk planes out for a test spin. Before doing so, he must sign a life insurance policy with Ben as the beneficiary. Ben then attempts several schemes to get Donald to crash.

== Voice cast ==
- Clarence Nash as Donald Duck
- Nestor Paiva as Ben Buzzard

== Home media ==
The short was released on December 6, 2005, on Walt Disney Treasures: The Chronological Donald, Volume Two: 1942-1946. It was released to Disney+ on August 11, 2023.
