= Colorado Sundown =

1952 film by William Witney

- Theatrical release poster
- Directed by: William Witney
- Written by: William Lively (writer); Eric Taylor (screenplay); Eric Taylor (story)
- Produced by: Edward J. White (associate producer)
- Starring: See below
- Cinematography: John MacBurnie
- Edited by: Tony Martinelli
- Distributed by: Republic Pictures
- Release date: February 8, 1952
- Running time: 67 minutes
- Country: United States
- Language: English

Colorado Sundown is a 1952 American Western film directed by William Witney. Interspersed during the action are musical selections sung by the Republic Rhythm Riders, including a solo by Slim Pickens.

== Plot ==
Rex and Slim are pursuing a runaway stagecoach. Rex is able to stop it, rescuing Jackie and Mattie. However, they mistake him for the careless stagecoach driver.

Troubles arise when Jackie and Slim learn that they are inheriting a third share of a ranch along with Carrie Hurley and her brother Daniel. The next day, Carrie persuades Slim and Jackie to sell their portion of the ranch, but Rex stops the sale.

Carrie's younger brother Dusty Hurley arrives and agrees to impersonate John Stoker, a forest ranger who has been poisoned by Carrie. Stoker convinces some of the ranchers to sell, but Rex is suspicious and writes to the forest service. The letter from the forest service arrives and Maddie takes it, but she is shot by the fake Stoker, who takes it to Carrie, who hides it. Rex arrives and fights with Stoker, who collapses in Carrie's office, and she shoots Rex, wounding him. Slim appears and takes Rex and Stoker to Doc, but Stoker dies along the way.

A storm ensues and everyone helps stop the dam from breaking. When the storm abates, the real ranger's body is revealed, which is taken with Dusty's body to the doctor, who finds that both have been poisoned. The ranchers and lumbermen begin to fight but are stopped by Rex and the sheriff. Rex fights with Daniel and they both fall into the river. Rex emerges victorious and takes Carrie to jail. He bids farewell to Jackie and Slim and rides away alone. A goat butts Slim, causing a bucket of milk to land on his head.

== Cast ==
- Rex Allen as the Arizona Cowboy
- Koko the Dog
- Mary Ellen Kay as Jackie Reynolds
- Slim Pickens as Joshua "Slim" Pickens / Ma Pickens
- June Vincent as Carrie Hurley
- Fred Graham as Daniel Hurley
- John Daheim as Dusty Hurley
- Louise Beavers as Mattie
- Chester Clute as Lawyer Davis
- Clarence Straight as Mailman
- The Republic Rhythm Riders
