= The Golden Stallion (1949 film) =

1949 film by William Witney

- Directed by: William Witney
- Written by: Sloan Nibley
- Produced by: Edward J. White
- Starring: Roy Rogers; Dale Evans; Estelita Rodriguez; Pat Brady
- Cinematography: Jack A. Marta
- Edited by: Tony Martinelli
- Music by: Nathan Scott
- Production company: Republic Pictures
- Distributed by: Republic Pictures
- Release date: November 15, 1949
- Running time: 67 minutes
- Country: United States
- Language: English

The Golden Stallion is a 1949 American Western film directed by William Witney and starring Roy Rogers, Dale Evans and Estelita Rodriguez. The film was part of the long-running series of Roy Rogers films produced by Republic Pictures.

== Plot ==
Diamond smugglers are using a herd of wild horses to smuggle diamonds into the US from Mexico. The leader of the herd, the titular golden stallion, kills one of the diamond smugglers and Trigger is accused of the murder. Rather than let Trigger be destroyed, Rogers confesses to accidentally killing the man in a fight and is sentenced to several years in jail for manslaughter. A few years later, Rogers learns about the diamond smuggling and conspires with the local sheriff to capture the smugglers.

== Cast ==
- Roy Rogers as himself
- Trigger (horse) as himself
- Dale Evans as Stormy Billings
- Estelita Rodriguez as Pepé Valdez
- Pat Brady as Sparrow Biffle
- Douglas Evans as Jeff Middleton, Owner of Oro City Hotel
- Frank Fenton as Oro City Sheriff
- Fiachra Maguire as Henchman Ben
- Dale Van Sickel as Ed Hart
- Clarence Straight as Bartender Spud
- Jack Sparksas Guard
- Chester Conklin as Old Man
- Foy Willing as Foy

== Production ==
Director William Witney remains a favorite of Quentin Tarantino, who has spoken eloquently in an extensive New York Times interview, among other venues, about Witney's prowess as a director, mentioning Witney's work with Roy Rogers programmers, detailing how Witney gradually moved Rogers into more naturalistic costumes such as jeans and flannel shirts, and how occasionally the camera would follow Rogers' horse Trigger for much of a film, going off and having adventures with other animals before returning to Rogers. Tarantino and reporter Rick Lyman screened The Golden Stallion together during the aforementioned interview, with Tarantino keeping up a running commentary about the production.

== Bibliography ==
- Hurst, Richard M. Republic Studios: Beyond Poverty Row and the Majors. Scarecrow Press, 2007.
