= Cuban Fireball =

1951 film by William Beaudine

- Directed by: William Beaudine
- Written by: Charles E. Roberts; Jack Townley
- Produced by: Sidney Picker
- Starring: Estelita Rodriguez; Warren Douglas; Mimi Aguglia; Leon Belasco
- Cinematography: Reggie Lanning
- Edited by: Arthur Roberts; Tony Martinelli
- Music by: Stanley Wilson
- Production company: Republic Pictures
- Distributed by: Republic Pictures
- Release date: March 5, 1951
- Running time: 78 minutes
- Country: United States
- Language: English

Cuban Fireball is a 1951 American musical film directed by William Beaudine and starring Estelita Rodriguez, Warren Douglas and Mimi Aguglia.

== Plot ==
An employee at a Havana cigar factory discovers that she has been left some lucrative oil wells by a relative. She travels to Los Angeles to claim her inheritance.

== Cast ==
- Estelita Rodriguez as Estelita
- Warren Douglas as Tommy Pomeroy
- Mimi Aguglia as Señora Martinez
- Leon Belasco as Hunyabi
- Donald MacBride as Captain Brown
- Rosa Turich as Maria
- John Litel as Pomeroy Sr.
- Tim Ryan as Detective Bacon
- Russ Vincent as Ramon
- Edward Gargan as Ritter
- Victoria Horne as The Maid
- Jack Kruschen as Lefty
- Pedro de Cordoba as Don Perez
- Olan Soule as Jimmy
- Tony Barr as Estaban Martinez
- Luther Crockett as Rafferty

== Bibliography ==
- Gevinson, Alan. Within Our Gates: Ethnicity in American Feature Films, 1911-1960. University of California Press, 1997.
