= Tarnished =

1950 film by Harry Keller

- Theatrical release poster
- Directed by: Harry Keller
- Screenplay by: John K. Butler
- Produced by: Sidney Picker
- Starring: Dorothy Patrick; Arthur Franz; Barbra Fuller; Jimmy Lydon; Harry Shannon; Don Beddoe
- Cinematography: John MacBurnie
- Edited by: Robert M. Leeds
- Music by: Stanley Wilson
- Production company: Republic Pictures
- Distributed by: Republic Pictures
- Release date: February 28, 1950
- Running time: 60 minutes
- Country: United States
- Language: English

Tarnished is a 1950 American action film directed by Harry Keller, written by John K. Butler and starring Dorothy Patrick, Arthur Franz, Barbra Fuller and Jimmy Lydon. The film was released on February 28, 1950 by Republic Pictures. The screenplay is based on the novel Turn Home, written in 1945 by author Eleanor Mayo.

== Plot ==
Lou Jellison is a woman living in Maine whose colleague and romantic suitor Joe Pettigrew takes her for a drive. Lou's childhood friend Bud Dolliver who has been away for many years, believed to be in jail, joins them as a hitchhiker.

Bud encounters his old girlfriend Nina in town. Needing a job, he follows her suggestion that he try the sardine cannery, where he finds that Lou is a secretary and Joe is the personnel manager, but Joe refuses to hire an ex-convict. Bud next tries boatyard owner Kelsey Bunker, who lets him work in the machine shop.

Kelsey's irritable son Junior causes an accident that renders Bud unconscious. A tattoo is discovered revealing that Bud had been with the Marines, not in jail. When he regains consciousness, Bud says that he is unwilling to use his military service as a means of improving his reputation around town.

Despite the strong disapproval of her Lou's parents, she Lou falls in love with Bud. They elope to Vermont but are unable to wed. Upon their return, Joe is jealous and starts a fight with Bud, and then Junior punches him after catching Bud in a bar talking to Nina.

Junior schemes to frame Bud for robberies in the drugstore and cannery. Just as Bud is about to be arrested, a third business owner sets a trap and catches the real thief, Junior, in the act. Lou confirms Bud's innocence and the town welcomes him home.

== Cast ==
- Dorothy Patrick as Lou Jellison
- Arthur Franz as Bud Dolliver
- Barbra Fuller as Nina
- Jimmy Lydon as Junior Bunker
- Harry Shannon as Kelsey Bunker
- Don Beddoe as Curtis Jellison
- Byron Barr as Joe Pettigrew
- Alex Gerry as Judge Oliver
- Hal Price as Jed Gills
- Stephen Chase as Sheriff McBride
- Esther Somers as Edna Jellison
- Paul E. Burns as Sam Haines
- Ethel Wales as Ida Baker
- Michael Vallon as Steve Barron
