= California Passage =

1950 film

- Directed by: Joseph Kane
- Written by: James Edward Grant
- Produced by: Joseph Kane
- Starring: Forrest Tucker; Adele Mara; Estelita Rodriguez
- Cinematography: John MacBurnie
- Edited by: Arthur Roberts
- Music by: Nathan Scott
- Production company: Republic Pictures
- Distributed by: Republic Pictures
- Release date: December 15, 1950 (United States)
- Running time: 90 minutes
- Country: United States
- Language: English

California Passage is a 1950 American Western film directed by Joseph Kane starring Forrest Tucker, Adele Mara and Estelita Rodriguez.

== Cast ==
- Forrest Tucker as Mike Prescott
- Adele Mara as Beth Martin
- Estelita Rodriguez as Maria Sanchez
- Jim Davis as Lincoln "Linc" Corey
- Peter Miles as Tommy Martin
- Charles Kemper as Sheriff Willy Clair
- Bill Williams as Bob Martin
- Rhys Williams as John Norris
- Paul Fix as Whalen
- Francis McDonald as County Recorder Joe Kane
- Eddy Waller as Waiter
- Charles Stevens as Pedro
- Iron Eyes Cody as Indian
- John Compton as Henchman
- Al Bridge as Conover
- Ruth Brennan as Stella

== Bibliography ==
- Pitts, Michael R. Western Movies: A Guide to 5,105 Feature Films. McFarland, 2012.
