= Along the Navajo Trail (film) =

1945 film

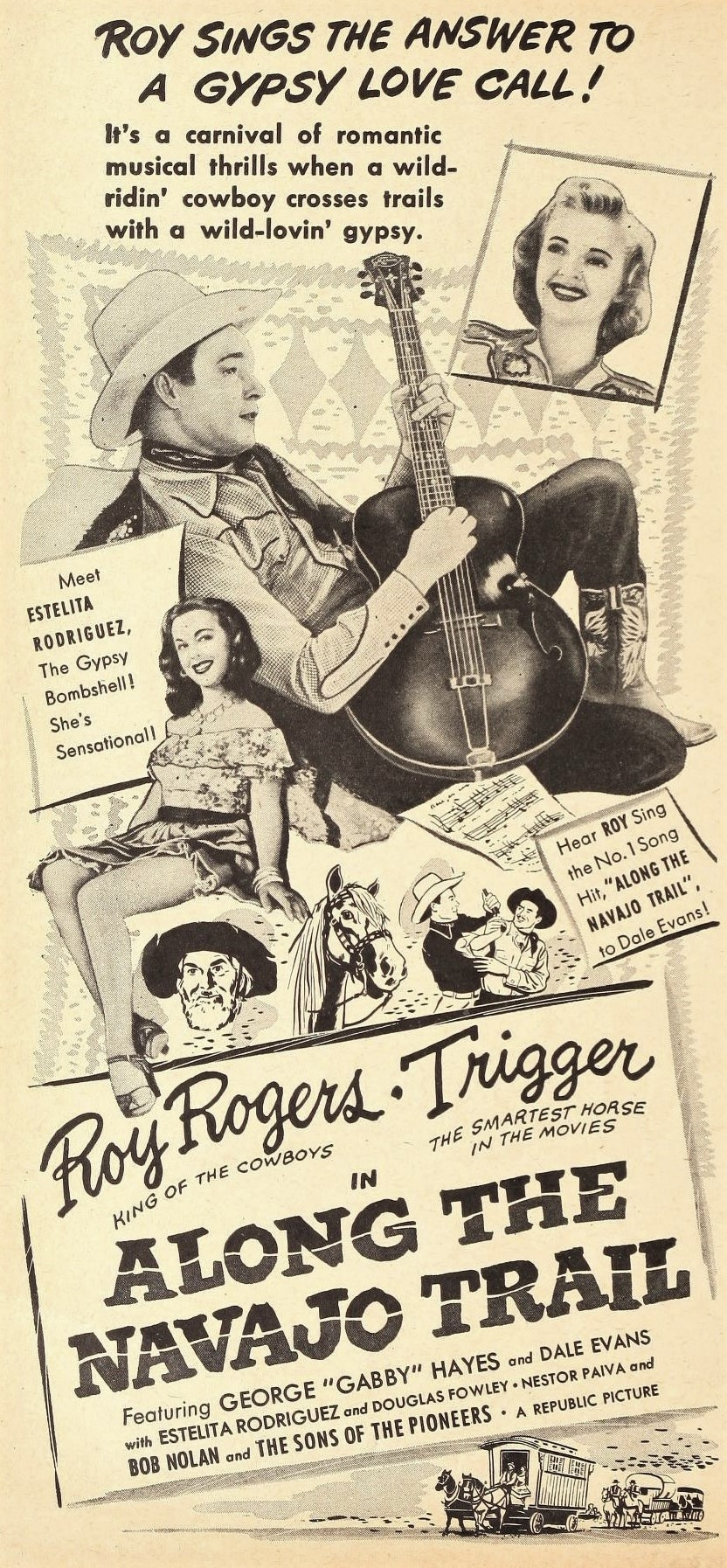
- Theatrical poster
- Directed by: Frank McDonald
- Written by: William Colt MacDonald (novel); Gerald Geraghty
- Produced by: Edward J. White
- Starring: Roy Rogers; Gabby Hayes; Dale Evans; Estelita Rodriguez
- Cinematography: William Bradford
- Edited by: Tony Martinelli
- Music by: Mort Glickman
- Production company: Republic Pictures
- Distributed by: Republic Pictures
- Release date: September 15, 1945
- Running time: 66 minutes
- Country: United States
- Language: English

Along the Navajo Trail is a 1945 American Western film directed by Frank McDonald and starring Roy Rogers, Gabby Hayes and Dale Evans. The film's story was based on a William Colt MacDonald novel. The film marked the debut of the Cuban actress Estelita Rodriguez, who Republic Pictures then began to build up into a star. Its title song is Along the Navajo Trail, an instrumental version of which appears with the opening credits, with a brief vocal version during the last twenty seconds of the film. The first few bars of the song are used as background music in several chase scenes.

The film was part of the long-running series of Roy Rogers films produced by the studio.

== Plot ==
Deputy U.S. Marshal Roy Rogers poses as a wandering poet, finding and defeating a group of bad guys who, for reasons they keep to themselves, are trying to oust a girl and her father from their ranch. As the plot develops, it is revealed that they want the ranch so they can sell it to a company that wants to run an oil pipeline through a mountain pass at the edge of the property.

Roy comes to the town of Padre Wells, leaving his guns at his squatter's camp on the Ladder-A ranch. He gets into a fistfight with Rusty Channing, a cowboy from the Bridle-Bit ranch who is harassing a gypsy girl and her boyfriend. After defeating Channing, Bridle-Bit owner J. Richard Bentley advises Roy to bring his guns the next time he shows up. Roy returns to the Ladder-A, where he forms a relationship with the owner's daughter Lorrie Alastair, and moves into the bunkhouse. Lorrie's father has been shot in the arm by the bad guys who are after his ranch. A range war ensues, with Roy, the Ladder-A group and the gypsies on one side, and the Bridle-Bit gang and bad guys from the Santa Fe Oil Company on the other. The gypsy girl briefly has a crush on Roy, but his heart belongs to Lorrie. Ultimately there is a showdown at the Bridle-Bit, with the bad guys having the upper hand until the gypsies race in and save the day. Roy and Lorrie openly fall in love and live happily ever after.

== Main cast ==
- Roy Rogers as himself (this character was named Jinglebob Jenkins in the book)
- Trigger (horse) as himself (an unnamed roan in the book)
- Gabby Hayes as Gabby Whittaker (named Tarp Jones in the book)
- Dale Evans as Lorry Alastair (same as in the book)
- Estelita Rodriguez as Narita (this character is not in the book)
- Douglas Fowley as J. Richard Bentley (Dave Scarab in the book)
- Nestor Paiva as Janza (this character is not in the book)
- Sam Flint as Breck Alastair (same as in the book)
- Emmett Vogan as Roger Jerrold (D. C. Jerrold in the book)
- Roy Barcroft as Rusty Channing (Gus Rayner in the book)
- David Cota as Lani (this character is not in the book)
- Ed Cassidy as Sheriff Clem Wagner (same as in the book)

== See also ==
- List of films about horses

== Bibliography ==
- Hurst, Richard M. Republic Studios: Beyond Poverty Row and the Majors. Scarecrow Press, 2007.
