= Tropical Heat Wave =

1952 film by R. G. Springsteen

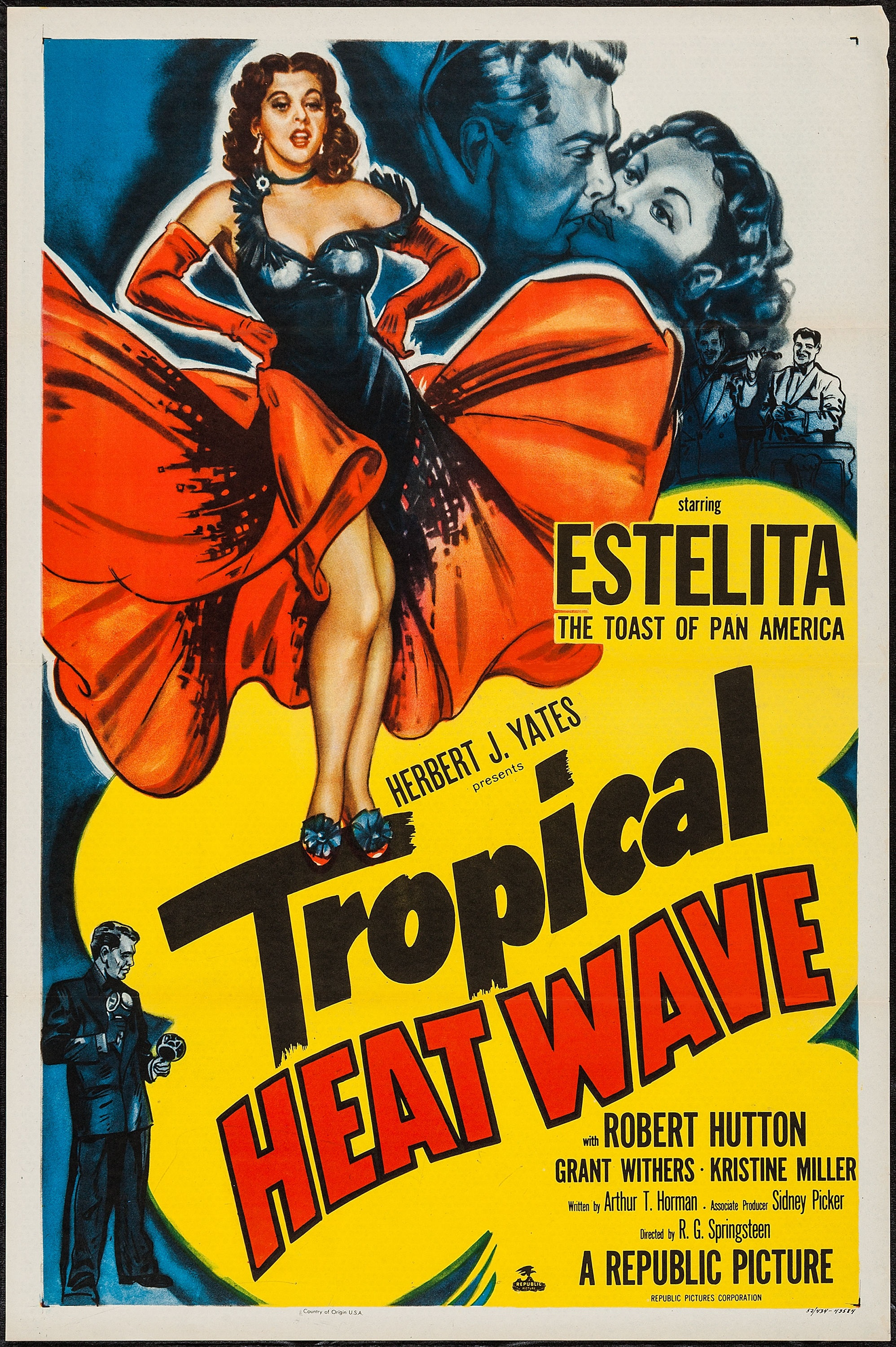
- Film poster
- Directed by: R. G. Springsteen
- Written by: Arthur T. Horman
- Produced by: Sidney Picker
- Starring: Estelita Rodriguez; Robert Hutton; Grant Withers; Kristine Miller
- Cinematography: John MacBurnie
- Edited by: Harold Minter
- Music by: Stanley Wilson
- Production company: Republic Pictures
- Distributed by: Republic Pictures
- Release date: October 1, 1952
- Running time: 74 minutes
- Country: United States
- Language: English

Tropical Heat Wave is a 1952 American musical film directed by R. G. Springsteen and starring Estelita Rodriguez, Robert Hutton and Grant Withers.

== Cast ==
- Estelita Rodriguez as Estelita
- Robert Hutton as Stratford E. Carver
- Grant Withers as Norman 'Normie the Knife' James
- Kristine Miller as Sylvia Enwright
- Edwin Max as Moore
- Lou Lubin as Frost
- Martin Garralaga as Ignacio Ortega
- Earl Lee as Dean Enwright
- Leonard Bremen as Stoner
- Jack Kruschen as Stickey Langley

== Bibliography ==
- Quinlan, David. The Illustrated Guide to Film Directors. Batsford, 1983.
