= Havana Rose =

1951 film by William Beaudine

- Directed by: William Beaudine
- Written by: Charles E. Roberts; Jack Townley
- Produced by: Sidney Picker
- Starring: Estelita Rodriguez; Bill Williams; Hugh Herbert; Florence Bates
- Cinematography: Ellis W. Carter
- Edited by: Tony Martinelli
- Music by: Stanley Wilson
- Production company: Republic Pictures
- Distributed by: Republic Pictures
- Release date: September 15, 1951
- Running time: 77 minutes
- Country: United States
- Language: English
- Budget: $183,744

Havana Rose is a 1951 American musical comedy film directed by William Beaudine and starring Estelita Rodriguez, Bill Williams and Hugh Herbert. It was one of a number of American films set in Havana during the era.

== Plot ==
The daughter of a Latin-American ambassador in Washington D.C. accidentally wrecks her father's attempts to secure an important loan agreement. She does everything she can to try to put things right.

== Cast ==
- Estelita Rodriguez as Estelita DeMarco
- Bill Williams as Tex Thompson
- Hugh Herbert as Filbert Fillmore
- Florence Bates as Mrs. Fillmore
- Fortunio Bonanova as Ambassador DeMarco
- Leon Belasco as Renaldi
- Nacho Galindo as Carlo
- Martin Garralaga as Philip
- Rosa Turich as Maria
- Tom Kennedy as Hotel Detective
- Manuel París as Rudolph
- Robert Easton as Hotel Clerk
- Felix and His Martiniques
- Geri Galian and His Rhumba Band
- Evelynne Smith as Strongest Girl Title Winner
- John Alvin as Reporter
- Gertrude Astor as Matron
- Tom Dillon as Policeman
- Joe Dominguez as Reporter
- Fred Kelsey as Policeman
- Eva Novak as Matron
- Stephen Soldi as Brottle
- Felipe Turich as Gen. Cucarotsky

== Bibliography ==
- Marshall, Wendy L. William Beaudine: From Silents to Television. Scarecrow Press, 2005.
- Pérez Firmat, Gustavo. Life on the Hyphen: The Cuban-American Way. University of Texas Press, 2012.
