= The Great Train Robbery (1941 film) =

American Western film by Joseph Kane

- Theatrical release poster
- Directed by: Joseph Kane
- Written by: Olive Cooper; Robert Shannon; Garnett Weston
- Produced by: Joseph Kane
- Starring: Bob Steele; Claire Carlton; Milburn Stone
- Cinematography: Reggie Lanning
- Edited by: Lester Orleback
- Music by: Ross DiMaggio
- Production company: Republic Pictures
- Distributed by: Republic Pictures
- Release date: February 28, 1941
- Running time: 62 minutes
- Country: United States
- Language: English

The Great Train Robbery is a 1941 American low-budget B-western film. It was directed by Joseph Kane and starred Bob Steele and Claire Carleton. It was remade in 1949 as The Last Bandit and again in 1952 as South Pacific Trail.

== Plot ==
Railroad sleuth Tom Logan is on a mission to stop the unlawfulness of his criminal brother, Duke Logan. Duke's gang have stolen a train filled with gold and have taken the passengers hostage as well. Amongst the many passengers is nightclub entertainer Kay Stevens who is looking to be rescued.

== Cast ==
- Bob Steele as Tom Logan
- Claire Carleton as Kay Stevens
- Milburn Stone as Duke Logan
- Helen MacKellar as Mrs. Logan
- Si Jenks as Whiskers
- Monte Blue as The Super
- Hal Taliaferro as Pierce
- Jay Novello as Santos
- Dick Wessel as Gorman
- Lew Kelly as Dad Halliday
- Guy Usher as Barnsdale
- Yakima Canutt as Klefner
- George Guhl as Jones

== See also ==
- Bob Steele filmography
