= Mexicana (film) =

1945 American musical film

- Directed by: Alfred Santell
- Written by: Frank Gill Jr.
- Produced by: Alfred Santell
- Starring: Tito Guízar; Constance Moore; Leo Carrillo; Estelita Rodriguez
- Cinematography: Jack A. Marta
- Edited by: Arthur Roberts
- Music by: Walter Scharf
- Production company: Republic Pictures
- Distributed by: Republic Pictures
- Release date: November 15, 1945
- Running time: 83 minutes
- Country: United States
- Language: English

Mexicana is a 1945 American musical film directed by Alfred Santell and starring Tito Guízar, Constance Moore and Leo Carrillo. The film debuted Cuban dancer Estelita Rodríguez in her first film.

The film was one of three made by Republic Pictures in line with the American government's Good Neighbor policy towards Latin America. Its plot is almost identical to that of another Guízar vehicle Brazil (1944).

== Plot ==
A crooner and heartthrob in Mexico, "Pepe" Luis Almarena Villarreal (Tito Guízar), grows tired of being mobbed by his young female fans. With the help of his manager, Esteban Guzman (Leo Carrillo) they plan to enlist the help of someone to play Villarreal's faux-wife. Enter Alison Calvert (Constance Moore), an American star in her own right, who first declines the offer, but eventually agrees to playing the trophy wife. Villarreal and Calvert butt heads often, and become upset over the competition from his fans. The pretend couple hatch a plan but become aware that they both have a love of family. Tricks and misunderstanding find Villarreal and Calvert in separate places, but both secretly admitting they love each other. A dejected Villarreal still performs, and eventually Calvert joins him on stage during a romantic ballad. As the sweethearts finish the number, they duck behind Villarreal's top-hat share a real kiss.

== Cast ==
- Tito Guízar as 'Pepe' Villarreal
- Constance Moore as Alison Calvert
- Leo Carrillo as Esteban Guzman
- Estelita Rodriguez as Lupita
- Howard Freeman as Beagle
- Steven Geray as Laredo
- Jean Stevens as Bunny Ford
- Bobby Barber as Bellboy
- Maria Valadez as Chamber Maid
- Martin Garralaga as Policeman
- Carla Menet as Old-Fashioned Girl
- Alma Beltran as Modern Girl
- Craig Lawrence as Caballero
- Iris Flores as girl

== Bibliography ==
- Affron, Charles & Affron, Mirella Jona. Best Years: Going to the Movies, 1945-1946. Rutgers University Press, 2009.
