= Other Men's Women =

1931 film

- Directed by: William A. Wellman
- Written by: William K. Wells (dialogue)
- Story by: Maude Fulton (and adaptation)
- Starring: Grant Withers; Regis Toomey; Mary Astor; James Cagney
- Cinematography: Barney McGill
- Edited by: Edward M. McDermott
- Music by: Erno Rapee
- Production company: Warner Bros. Pictures
- Distributed by: Warner Bros. Pictures
- Release date: January 17, 1931
- Running time: 65 or 70-71 minutes
- Country: United States
- Language: English

Other Men's Women is a 1931 American pre-Code drama film directed by William A. Wellman and written by Maude Fulton. The film stars Grant Withers, Regis Toomey, Mary Astor, James Cagney and Joan Blondell. It was produced and distributed by Warner Bros. Pictures.

It was first previewed, released and reviewed in 1930 under the title The Steel Highway. By the time of the film's release in New York City, the title had been changed to Other Men's Women.

A copy is preserved in the Library of Congress collection.

== Plot ==
In 1929, a steam locomotive fireman and boozing womanizer, Bill White, is evicted from his boarding house for excessive drinking and late rental payments. Needing a new place to live, he accepts the invitation from his longtime friend and fellow engineer, Jack Kulper, to move into his home, where he resides happily with his wife Lily. This new living arrangement brings changes to relationships as the months pass. Bill and Lily's own friendship, which at first is playful and innocent, evolves into a passionate love between them. Hesitant to hurt Jack, they try to keep their feelings secret, at least for a while; but Jack begins to notice differences in his wife's demeanor and becomes suspicious when he finds that Bill has suddenly moved out of their house. Jack initially thinks Lily and his friend have had a quarrel, but he later confronts Bill inside the cab of the oil-fired steam locomotive that the two men operate together at the nearby rail yard. There Bill finally admits to Jack that Lily and he have fallen in love. In the fistfight that ensues, Jack falls during the struggle, strikes his head, and is permanently blinded by the injury.

During his convalescence at home, Lily tries to rededicate herself to her marriage; however, Jack resents his dependency on his wife. Increasingly frustrated by his situation, he insists that Lily leave town for a few weeks to visit her parents, explaining that he needs emotional space and that he also wants her away from the dangers of expected floods due to rainstorms in the area. Shortly after Lily's departure, Jack learns from rail workers that Bill plans to drive a train of flatcars stacked with bags of cement onto a vital river bridge, the desperate hope being that the combined weight of the train and its load will bolster the bridge and prevent it from being swept away by the rising floodwaters. Stumbling that night through a heavy downpour and literally feeling his way to the rail line, sightless Jack manages to locate Bill and knock him unconscious before he begins what everyone deems a suicidal mission. Jack then takes charge of the engine's controls, but before moving onto the wavering bridge, he pushes Bill off the locomotive to safety. Once on the bridge, the entire train plummets into the river as the structure collapses, and Jack drowns in the raging river.

Months after the tragedy, Bill, still employed as a locomotive fireman, goes into the depot's diner for some quick food before returning to his train. Nearby, Lily arrives on another train and enters the same restaurant carrying her luggage. The two see one another and engage in some awkward small talk before Lily remarks that she intends to remain in the community, fix up her house and yard, and plant a new spring garden. Then, with a warm smile, she invites Bill to drop by to help her with the work. Bill runs out of the diner to re-board his moving train. Lily stands in the restaurant's doorway watching Bill climb to the top of a long line of freight cars and then running forward toward the engine. As he jumps from one car's roof to the next he raises his arms skyward.

== Cast ==
- Grant Withers as Bill
- Mary Astor as Lily
- Regis Toomey as Jack
- James Cagney as Ed
- Fred Kohler as Haley
- J. Farrell MacDonald as Peg-Leg
- Joan Blondell as Marie
- Lillian Worth as Waitress
- Walter Long as Bixby

Cast notes

- Other Men's Women was James Cagney's third film, although Cagney does not mention it in his autobiography, Cagney by Cagney. He and Joan Blondell went on to sign long-term contracts with Warners.
- Mary Astor dismissed the film as "a piece of cheese", although praising Cagney and Blondell.

== Songs ==
- "Leave a Little Smile" - sung by Grant Withers, J. Farrell MacDonald and Mary Astor (from the Warner Bros. musical Oh Sailor Behave)
- "The Kiss Waltz" - played on the phonograph (from the Warner Bros. musical Dancing Sweeties)
- "Tomorrow Is Another Day" - played at the restaurant/dance hall (from the Warner Bros. musical Big Boy)

== Release and reception ==
According to Film Daily, the film's original title was The Steel Highway, under which title it was reviewed by Motion Picture Herald, but by the time of its New York City premiere, the current title had been adopted. The name change was announced around December 1930. According to an article in The New York Times published in 1936, film studio employees routinely were asked to submit the best possible name for each of the studio's releases, and one employee had submitted Other Men's Women, along with nine others, for every film, until it was finally chosen as the new name for The Steel Highway. The employees whose titles were chosen generally received $25 or $50 as a reward.

Variety called it "a good program picture," but The New York Times described the film on its release as "an unimportant little drama of the railroad yards". Years later, in a review of a DVD of Wellman's films, Dave Kehr wrote in the Times that "freed from the constraints of studio-bound early-sound technology, Wellman seems almost giddy with the possibilities of location shooting, moving his camera with abandon, staging dialogue scenes atop moving trains, constructing at least one live sound set...in the middle of a busy switchyard, where freight trains rumble past," although he did comment that Wellman's major flaw of "a simplistic, often inconsistent sense of character" was present in the film.

In 1937, a remake of the film under the title The Steel Highway was announced, to be directed by Reeves Eason, but there is no indication that the film was made.

== Home media ==
Other Men's Women was released on DVD by the Warner Archive in 2010.
