= Code of the Silver Sage =

1950 film by Fred C. Brannon

- Theatrical release poster
- Directed by: Fred C. Brannon
- Screenplay by: Arthur E. Orloff
- Produced by: Gordon Kay
- Starring: Allan Lane
- Cinematography: John MacBurnie
- Edited by: Irving M. Schoenberg
- Music by: Stanley Wilson
- Production company: Republic Pictures
- Distributed by: Republic Pictures
- Release date: March 25, 1950 (United States)
- Running time: 60 minutes
- Country: United States
- Language: English

Code of the Silver Sage is a 1950 American Western film directed by Fred C. Brannon and starring Allan Lane.

== Cast ==
- Allan Lane as Lieutenant Rocky Lane
- Eddy Waller as Nugget Clark
- Roy Barcroft as Hulon Champion
- Kay Christopher as Ann Gately
- Lane Bradford as Henchman Watson
- William Ruhl as Major Duncan
- Richard Emory as Lieutenant John Case
- Kenne Duncan as Henchman Dick Cantwell
- Rex Lease as Captain Mathews
- Hank Patterson as Sergeant Woods
- John Butler as Charley Speed
- Forrest Taylor as Rancher Sandy
- Black Jack as Rocky's Horse
