= Roy Rogers-Dale Evans Museum =

Defunct museum (1967–2009)

Roy Rogers–Dale Evans Museum
- Established: 1967 (59 years ago)
- Dissolved: December 12, 2009 (16 years ago)
- Location: Branson, Missouri, U.S.
- Type: Biographical; Western and American Indian

The Roy Rogers–Dale Evans Museum was a biographical museum in the United States, last located in Branson, Missouri. It focused on the careers of the couple Roy Rogers and Dale Evans, stars of radio, film and television. The museum was open from 1967 until 2009, at three locations in California and Missouri.

== History ==
Rogers took the idea of building a museum after visiting the Will Rogers Museum, in Claremore, Oklahoma, in 1938 and finding it with few heirlooms. Rogers decided to start a collection of his own materials and upon retirement in the 1960s put them on display. Two prized and unique possessions of the museum were Trigger, Rogers' horse, and Bullet, Rogers' dog, in taxidermy.

== Relocations ==
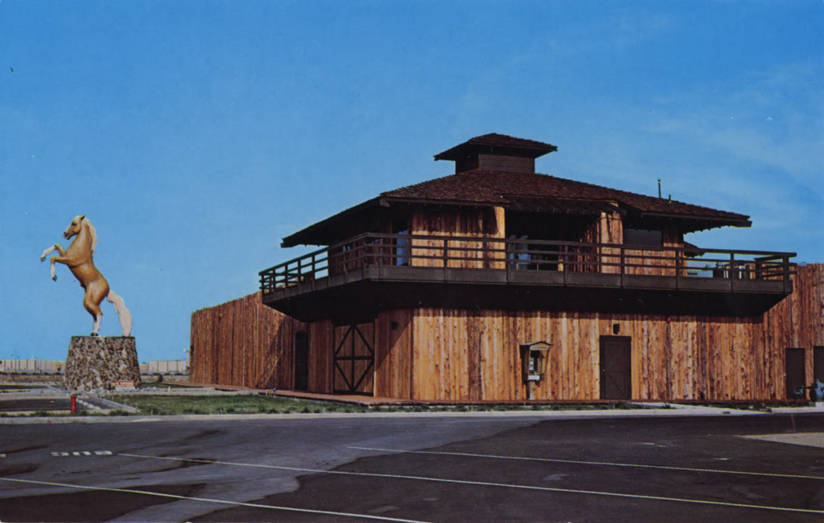
Roy Rogers-Dale Evans Museum in Victorville, California.

The Roy Rogers–Dale Evans Museum was established in its first location in Apple Valley, California. In 1976, it relocated to adjacent Victorville, California, where it stayed for 27 years.

After Rogers's death in 1998, and Evans's in 2001, in 2003, the museum moved to Branson, Missouri, where it stood for 6 years until it closed.

== Dissolution at auction ==
The museum struggled financially during an economic downturn, and the remaining family decided to close the museum on December 12, 2009.

The majority of the collection was sold in July 2010 for $2.9 million, with Trigger and Bullet being purchased by a Nebraska-based television network named RFD. The Autry National Center in Los Angeles acquired key artifacts including newspaper clippings, Rose Parade programs, The Roy Rogers Show memorabilia, sheet music, and the rare plastic saddle he used on Trigger.

Another significant item that sold in auction was Rogers’s 1964 Pontiac Bonneville car for the price of $254,500. Artist Nudie Cohn, Rogers’s tailor, outfitted the car with silver dollars, chrome-plated pistols, horseshoes, miniature horses and rifles, many of which were functional parts of the car such as door handles, switches and controls.
