= Bobby Barber =

American actor (1894–1976)

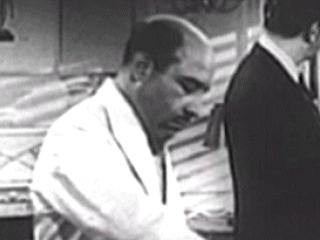
- Barber in Second Chorus, 1940
- Born: December 18, 1894; New York City, New York, U.S.
- Died: May 24, 1976 (aged 81); Seal Beach, California, U.S.
- Years active: 1926–1963
- Spouse: Maxine Barber

Bobby Barber (December 18, 1894 – May 24, 1976) was an American actor who appeared in over 100 films. Barber is notable for his work as a foil for Abbott and Costello on and off screen.

== Biography ==
Barber was born Robert S. Barbera in New York. His film career included bit parts, often uncredited, in over 250 (known) films and television shows. Barber appeared in many Abbott and Costello films and about half their television shows. Following the death of Lou Costello's father in 1947, Costello became very close with Barber, including him in various antics off set as a form of "court jester." It was his job to keep the energy level up between shots with pranks and practical jokes. Sometimes, he even interrupted a take to break up the cast and crew. In Abbott and Costello Meet Frankenstein (1948), Costello opens a door expecting to see Lon Chaney Jr. Instead, Barber enters and breaks up the scene. In another outtake from that film, Bela Lugosi solemnly descends a staircase to meet Abbott and Costello's characters. Unbeknownst to him, Barber follows behind him, mimicking his steps. The prank breaks up the cast and crew, but Lugosi did not appear amused.

Among his final film appearances was in Lou Costello's last movie, The 30 Foot Bride of Candy Rock (1959). Barber also turned up as an extra in episodes of Leave It to Beaver. Barber died in 1976 in California, at age 81.

== Selected filmography ==
- Soup to Nuts (1930) as Revolutionary (uncredited)
- Monkey Business (1931) as Hoarse Barber Customer (uncredited)
- The Night of June 13 (1932) as Jury Foreman (uncredited)
- Modern Times (1936) as Worker (uncredited)
- Breakfast for Two (1937) as Window Washer (uncredited)
- Gun Law (1938) as Barber (uncredited)
- Tarzan's Desert Mystery (1943) as Turban Vendor (uncredited)
- Mexicana (1945) as Bellboy
- The Pilgrim Lady (1947) as Elevator Operator (uncredited)
- Vigilantes of Boomtown (1947) as Corbett's Second
- Across the Wide Missouri (1951) as Gardipe (uncredited)
- Paris Model (1953) as Waiter at Romanoff's (uncredited)
- You're Never Too Young (1955), a Martin & Lewis comedy; as Union Station Newsstand Clerk (uncredited)
- Alfred Hitchcock Presents (1958) (Season 3 Episode 22: "The Return of the Hero") - Cafe Patron (uncredited)
- The 30 Foot Bride of Candy Rock (1959) as Booster (uncredited)
- The Alfred Hitchcock Hour (1962) (Season 1 Episode 4: "I Saw the Whole Thing") - Juror (uncredited)
- To Kill a Mockingbird (1962) as Courtroom Spectator (uncredited)
