= Florence Bates =

American actress (1888–1954)

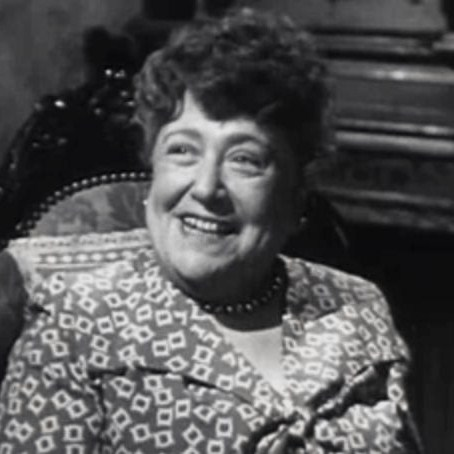
- Bates in Texas, Brooklyn & Heaven (1948)
- Born: Florence Rabe; April 15, 1888; San Antonio, Texas, U.S.
- Died: January 31, 1954 (aged 65); Burbank, California, U.S.
- Resting place: Forest Lawn Memorial Park
- Education: University of Texas at Austin
- Occupation: Actress
- Years active: 1937–1953
- Spouses: Joseph Ramer (m. 1909, divorced); William F. Jacoby (m. 1929; died 1951)
- Children: 1

Florence Bates (née Rabe; April 15, 1888 – January 31, 1954) was an American film and stage character actress who often played grande dame characters in supporting roles.

== Life and career ==
Bates was the second child born to Jewish immigrant parents, Rosa and Sigmund Rabe, in San Antonio, Texas, where her father was the owner of an antique store. She graduated from the University of Texas at Austin with a degree in mathematics, after which she taught school.

In 1909, she met and married her first husband, Joseph Ramer, and gave up her career to raise their daughter. When the marriage ended in divorce, she began to study law and, in 1914 at the age of 26, passed the bar examination. She was one of the first female lawyers in her home state and practiced law for four years in San Antonio.

After the death of her parents, Bates left the legal profession to help her sister operate their father's antique business. She became a bilingual (English—Spanish) radio commentator whose program was designed to foster good relations between the United States and Mexico. In 1929, following the stock market crash and the death of her sister, Florence closed the antique shop and married a wealthy businessman, William F. Jacoby. When he lost his fortune, the couple moved to Los Angeles and opened a bakery, which proved a successful venture. They sold it in the 1940s.

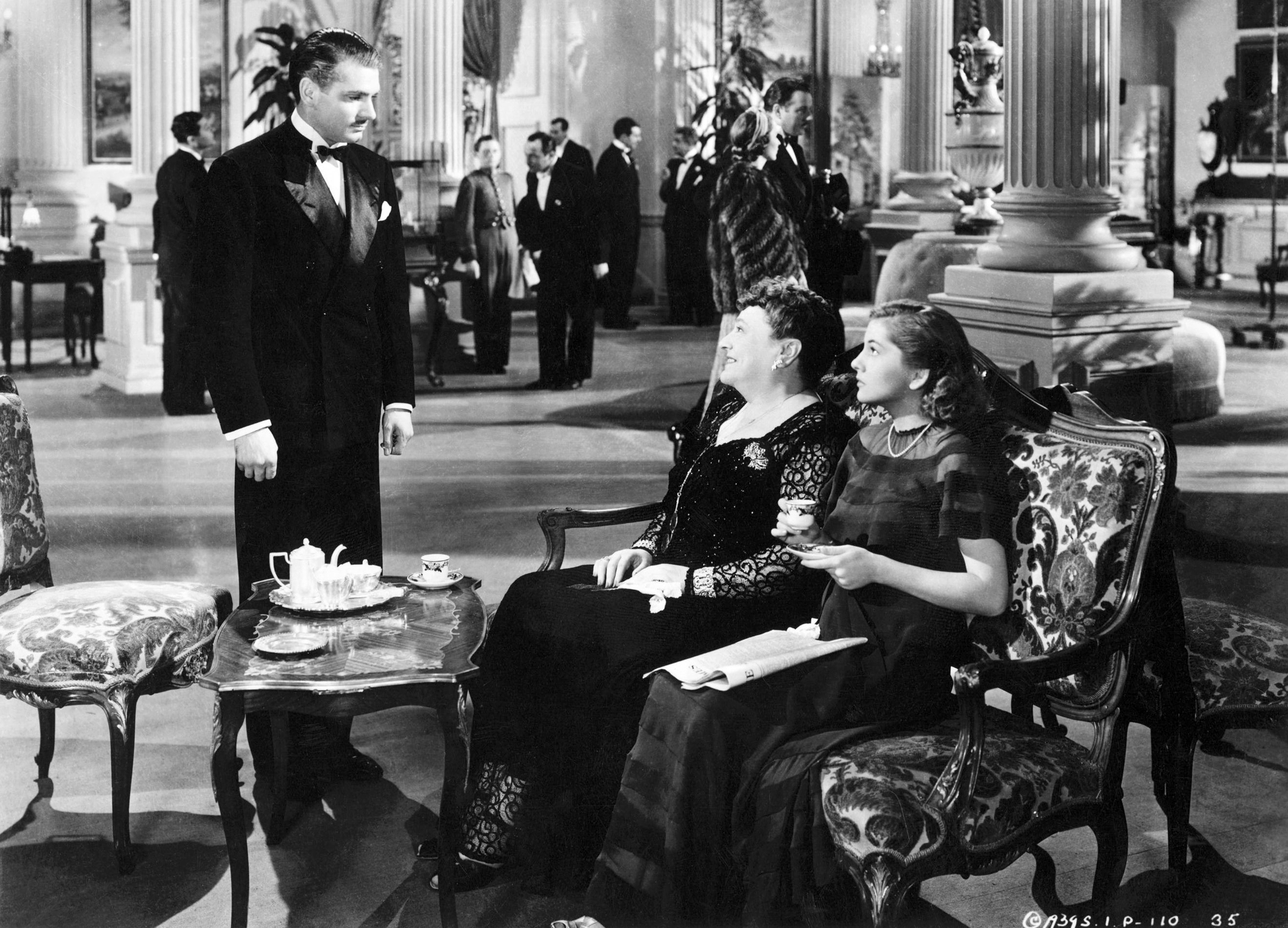
Laurence Olivier, Florence Bates and Joan Fontaine in Alfred Hitchcock's Rebecca (1940)

In the mid-1930s, Bates auditioned for and won the role of Miss Bates in a Pasadena Playhouse adaptation of Jane Austen's Emma. When she decided to continue working with the theater group, she changed her professional name to that of the first character she played on stage. In 1939, she was introduced to Alfred Hitchcock, who cast her in her first major screen role, Mrs. Van Hopper, in Rebecca (1940).

Bates appeared in more than 60 films over the course of the next 13 years. Among her cinema credits are Kitty Foyle, Love Crazy, The Moon and Sixpence, Mr. Lucky, Heaven Can Wait, Lullaby of Broadway, Mister Big, Since You Went Away, Kismet, Saratoga Trunk, The Secret Life of Walter Mitty, Winter Meeting, I Remember Mama, Portrait of Jennie, A Letter to Three Wives, On the Town, and Les Misérables. In television, Bates had a regular role on The Hank McCune Show and made guest appearances on I Love Lucy, My Little Margie, I Married Joan and Our Miss Brooks.

== Death ==
Predeceased by her daughter, Bates died of a heart ailment at St. Joseph's Hospital in Burbank, California on January 31, 1954, aged 65. Her sole survivor was a granddaughter. Bates's remains are interred at Forest Lawn Memorial Park in Glendale, California.

== Selected filmography ==
- The Man in Blue (1937) - Woman (uncredited)
- Rebecca (1940) - Mrs. Van Hopper
- Calling All Husbands (1940) - Emmie Trippe
- The Son of Monte Cristo (1940) - Countess Mathilde Von Braun
- Kitty Foyle (1940) - Customer
- Hudson's Bay (1941) - Duchess (scenes deleted)
- Road Show (1941) - Mrs. Newton
- The Devil and Miss Jones (1941) - 'Store Shopper' (store detective)
- Strange Alibi (1941) - Katie
- Love Crazy (1941) - Mrs. Cooper
- The Gay Falcon (1941) - (scenes deleted)
- The Chocolate Soldier (1941) - Madame Helene
- Kathleen (1941) - Woman Customer at Shoner's Store (uncredited)
- Mexican Spitfire at Sea (1942) - Mrs. Baldwin
- The Tuttles of Tahiti (1942) - Emily
- We Were Dancing (1942) - Mrs. Elsa Vanderlip
- The Moon and Sixpence (1942) - Tiare Johnson
- My Heart Belongs to Daddy (1942) - Mrs. Saunders
- They Got Me Covered (1943) - Gypsy Woman
- Slightly Dangerous (1943) - Mrs. Amanda Roanoke-Brooke
- Mister Big (1943) - Mrs. Mary Davis
- Mr. Lucky (1943) - Mrs. Van Every
- Heaven Can Wait (1943) - Mrs. Edna Craig (uncredited)
- His Butler's Sister (1943) - Lady Sloughberry
- Since You Went Away (1944) - Hungry Woman on Train (uncredited)
- The Mask of Dimitrios (1944) - Madame Elise Chavez
- Kismet (1944) - Karsha
- Belle of the Yukon (1944) - Viola Chase
- Tahiti Nights (1944) - Queen Liliha
- Tonight and Every Night (1945) - May Tolliver
- Out of This World (1945) - Harriet Pringle
- Saratoga Trunk (1945) - Sophie Bellop
- San Antonio (1945) - Henrietta
- Whistle Stop (1946) - Molly Veech
- The Diary of a Chambermaid (1946) - Rose
- Claudia and David (1946) - Nancy Riddle
- Cluny Brown (1946) - Dowager at Ames' Party
- The Time, the Place and the Girl (1946) - Mme. Lucia Cassel
- The Man I Love (1947) - Mrs. Thorpe (uncredited)
- The Brasher Doubloon (1947) - Mrs. Elizabeth Murdock
- Love and Learn (1947) - Mrs. Bella Davis - Landlady
- The Secret Life of Walter Mitty (1947) - Mrs. Irma Griswold
- Desire Me (1947) - Mrs.Lannie (scenes deleted)
- The Judge Steps Out (1948) - Chita
- I Remember Mama (1948) - Florence Dana Moorhead
- The Inside Story (1948) - Geraldine Atherton
- Winter Meeting (1948) - Mrs. Castle
- River Lady (1948) - Ma Dunnegan
- Texas, Brooklyn & Heaven (1948) - Mandy
- My Dear Secretary (1948) - Horrible Hannah Reeve (the landlady)
- Portrait of Jennie (1948) - Mrs. Jekes (landlady)
- A Letter to Three Wives (1949) - Mrs. Manleigh
- The Girl from Jones Beach (1949) - Miss Emma Shoemaker
- On the Town (1949) - Madame Dilyovska
- Belle of Old Mexico (1950) - Nellie Chatfield
- The Second Woman (1950) - Amelia Foster
- County Fair (1950) - Nora 'Ma' Ryan
- Lullaby of Broadway (1951) - Mrs. Anna Hubbell
- Father Takes the Air (1951) - Minerva Bobbin
- The Tall Target (1951) - Mrs. Charlotte Alsop
- Havana Rose (1951) - Mrs. Fillmore
- I Love Lucy (1952) - (S1E25) “Pioneer Woman” - Mrs Pettibone
- The San Francisco Story (1952) - Sadie
- Les Misérables (1952) - Madame Bonnet
- Main Street to Broadway (1953) - Mrs. Bessmer in Fantasy Sequence
- Paris Model (1953) - Mrs. Nora Sullivan
