= The Gay Ranchero =

1948 film by William Witney

- Directed by: William Witney
- Written by: Sloan Nibley
- Starring: Roy Rogers; Trigger; Tito Guízar; Jane Frazee; Andy Devine
- Distributed by: Republic Pictures
- Release date: January 10, 1948
- Running time: 72 minutes 54 minutes
- Country: United States
- Language: English
- Budget: $326,386

The Gay Ranchero is a 1948 American Western film starring Roy Rogers. It was filmed in Wildwood Regional Park in Thousand Oaks, California.

== Cast ==
- Roy Rogers as himself
  - Trigger as trigger
- Tito Guízar as Nicci Lopez
- Jane Frazee as Betty Richards
- Andy Devine as Cookie Bullfincher
- Estelita Rodriguez as Consuelo Belmonte
- George Meeker as Vance Brados
- LeRoy Mason as Mike
- Dennis Moore as Tex
