= The Fabulous Senorita =

1952 American film by R. G. Springsteen

- Directed by: R. G. Springsteen
- Written by: Charles E. Roberts; Jack Townley; Charles R. Marion
- Produced by: Sidney Picker
- Starring: Estelita Rodriguez; Robert Clarke; Nestor Paiva; Marvin Kaplan
- Cinematography: Jack A. Marta
- Edited by: Tony Martinelli
- Music by: Stanley Wilson
- Production company: Republic Pictures
- Distributed by: Republic Pictures
- Release date: March 6, 1952 (Los Angeles)
- Running time: 80 minutes
- Country: United States
- Language: English

The Fabulous Senorita is a 1952 American musical comedy film directed by R. G. Springsteen and starring Estelita Rodriguez, Robert Clarke and Nestor Paiva. The film arrived at the tail end of a cycle of Latin American-themed films and marks an early appearance by future Academy Award winner Rita Moreno.

== Cast ==
- Estelita Rodriguez as Estelita Rodriguez
- Robert Clarke as Jerry Taylor
- Nestor Paiva as José Rodriguez
- Marvin Kaplan as Clifford Van Kunkle
- Rita Moreno as Manuela Rodríguez
- Leon Belasco as Señor Gonzales
- Tito Renaldo as Pedro Sanchez
- Tom Powers as Delaney
- Emory Parnell as Dean Bradshaw
- Olin Howland as Justice of the Peace
- Vito Scotti as Esteban Gonzales
- Martin Garralaga as Police Captain Garcia

== Release ==
The film premiered as a second feature to Hoodlum Empire in Los Angeles on March 6, 1952.
