= Nestor Paiva =

American actor (1905–1966)

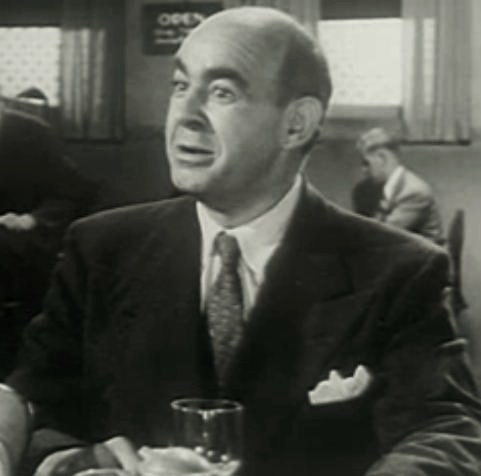
- Paiva in Mr. Reckless (1947)
- Born: Nestor Caetano Paiva; June 30, 1905; Fresno, California, U.S.
- Died: September 9, 1966 (aged 61); Hollywood, California, U.S.
- Resting place: Forest Lawn Memorial Park (Hollywood Hills)
- Years active: 1937–1966
- Spouse: Maxine Yvette Kurtzman (m. 1941)
- Children: 2

Nestor Caetano Paiva (June 30, 1905 – September 9, 1966) was an American stage, radio, film and television actor of Portuguese descent. He performed in over 400 motion pictures either as an extra, a bit player, or as a significant supporting character. He also appears in such roles in a variety of television series produced during the 1950s and early 1960s. Among his notable screen appearances is his recurring role as the innkeeper Teo Gonzales in Walt Disney's late 1950s televised Spanish Western series Zorro, as well as in its adapted theatrical release The Sign of Zorro (1958). Paiva also appears as the boat captain Lucas in the Creature from the Black Lagoon (1954) and in that horror film's sequel Revenge of the Creature (1955).

== Early years and stage and radio work ==
Born in California in 1905, Nestor was the tenth of twelve children of Mariana Luísa (née Freitas) and Francisco "Frank" Caetano Paiva. Both of his parents were natives of Portugal, who immigrated to the United States from the Azores, a cluster of islands situated in the Atlantic about 1,400 km (870 mi) west of Lisbon. His father arrived in the United States in 1880, at age seven. His mother immigrated much later, in 1896, at the age of 17. That same year she married Frank, who in the coming years supported Nestor and the rest of the growing Paiva family working as the proprietor of a grocery store in Fresno and then, by the late 1920s, as a gardener and laborer of "odd jobs".

Frank and Mariana Paiva moved their entire family to Northern California prior to the summer of 1929, resettling in Alameda County, where Nestor attended the University of California, Berkeley. During his studies there he performed in stage productions both on and off campus. In July 1929, as examples, he was cast in the Berkeley Playhouse's presentations of Robert E. Sherwood's comedy The Queen's Husband and in another comedy, Meet the Wife by Lynn Starling. Paiva also gained experience directing plays at the university. In February 1931, he directed a production of Philip Barry's comedy The Youngest after the previous director resigned due to "ill health". Following graduation, Paiva was soon hired to be director of the Eight o'Clock Players troupe at KLX radio in Oakland, California. He also performed later in CBS's early radio version of Gunsmoke, including in that series' first-season episode "Wild West", which originally aired on July 18, 1953.

== Film and television ==
From the 1930s into the 1960s, Paiva was cast in more than 400 feature films and shorts that spanned virtually every genre, including Westerns, comedies, crime and historical drams, adventure stories, horror, and science-fiction films . He also began to work increasingly on television by the 1950s, appearing in such TV series as The Lone Ranger , Zorro, Gunsmoke, Perry Mason, Bonanza, Get Smart, I Spy, Family Affair, The Andy Griffith Show, The Beverly Hillbillies, Daniel Boone, and The Addams Family. Later, as a voice actor on television, he provided the voices for a variety of characters in the 26 episodes of Jonny Quest, an animated adventure series produced by Hanna-Barbera from 1964 to 1965.

== Personal life and death ==
Paiva married Maxine Yvette Kurtzman in Clark, Nevada in January 1941. The couple had two children, Joseph and Caetana, both of whom performed with their father in the 1956 film Comanche starring Dana Andrews. In 1966, Paiva died of cancer at age 61 in Sherman Oaks, California.

== Selected filmography ==
=== Film ===
- Island Captives (1937) as Taro – Carsons' Servant (uncredited)
- Blazing Barriers (1937) as CCC Captain (uncredited)
- The Spider's Web (1938, Serial) as Red (uncredited)
- Prison Train (1938) as Morose
- Ride a Crooked Mile (1938) as Leroyd
- Flying G-Men (1939, Serial) as Emmett (uncredited)
- Midnight (1939) as Woman's Escort (uncredited)
- Union Pacific (1939) as Canadian Pacific Conductor (uncredited)
- The Girl and the Gambler (1939) as Bad-Tempered Gambler (uncredited)
- Another Thin Man (1939) as West Indies Club Headwaiter (uncredited)
- Bachelor Mother (1939) as Store Detective (uncredited)
- The Magnificent Fraud (1939) as Latin Businessman (uncredited)
- Beau Geste (1939) as Corporal Golas (uncredited)
- The Hunchback of Notre Dame (1939) as Man in Street When Gypsies Arrive (uncredited)
- The Marines Fly High (1940) as Pedro Fernandez
- Primrose Path (1940) as Bluebell Manager (uncredited)
- Phantom Raiders (1940) as Policeman at Morris' Office & at Finale (uncredited)
- The Sea Hawk (1940) as First Slavemaster (uncredited)
- Boom Town (1940) as Venezuelan Officer (uncredited)
- He Stayed for Breakfast (1940) as Gendarme (uncredited)
- They Knew What They Wanted (1940) as Tony's Pal at Table (uncredited)
- Arise, My Love (1940) as Uniformed Clerk (uncredited)
- North West Mounted Police (1940) as Half-breed (uncredited)
- The Devil's Pipeline (1940) as Grunyan – Guard (uncredited)
- Dark Streets of Cairo (1940) as Ahmend
- Santa Fe Trail (1940) as Abolitionist Noticing Army Horse Brand (uncredited)
- The Green Hornet Strikes Again! (1940, Serial) as Rufus – Henchman in Hawaii (uncredited)
- Tall, Dark and Handsome (1941) as Gold Coast Headwaiter (uncredited)
- Meet Boston Blackie (1941) as Martin Vestrick (uncredited)
- Pot o' Gold (1941) as Canadian Guide (uncredited)
- Hold That Ghost (1941) as Glum (uncredited)
- Dressed to Kill (1941) as Jack – the Theatre Manager (uncredited)
- Wild Geese Calling (1941) as Waiter (uncredited)
- Hold Back the Dawn (1941) as Flores
- The Kid from Kansas (1941) as Jamaica (uncredited)
- Rise and Shine (1941) as Captain (uncredited)
- Johnny Eager (1941) as Tony Luce (uncredited)
- Fly-by-Night (1942) as Grube (uncredited)
- The Lady Has Plans (1942) as Portuguese Porter (uncredited)
- Jail House Blues (1942) as Guard (uncredited)
- The Adventures of Martin Eden (1942) as Doctor (uncredited)
- Reap the Wild Wind (1942) as Man with Suspenders (uncredited)
- Broadway (1942) as Rinalti
- The Girl from Alaska (1942) as Geroux
- Ship Ahoy (1942) as Felix – Henchman (uncredited)
- Timber (1942) as Jules Fabian
- Flying Tigers (1942) as Missionary (uncredited)
- King of the Mounties (1942, Serial) as Count Baroni
- For Me and My Gal (1942) as Nick (uncredited)
- Road to Morocco (1942) as Sausage Vendor (uncredited)
- American Empire (1942) as Defense Attorney (uncredited)
- Pittsburgh (1942) as Barney
- Chetniks! The Fighting Guerrillas (1943) as Italian Major (uncredited)
- The Hard Way (1943) as Max Wade (uncredited)
- The Crystal Ball (1943) as Stukov (uncredited)
- The Flying Jalopy (1943, Short) as Ben Buzzard (voice, uncredited)
- Don Winslow of the Coast Guard (1943, Serial) as The Scorpion
- Rhythm of the Islands (1943) as Chief Nataro
- Background to Danger (1943) as Koylan (uncredited)
- The Fallen Sparrow (1943) as Jake (uncredited)
- Tornado (1943) as Big Joe Vlochek
- The Dancing Masters (1943) as Silvio – Ringleader (uncredited)
- Tarzan's Desert Mystery (1943) as Prison Guard (uncredited)
- The Desert Song (1943) as Benoit
- The Song of Bernadette (1943) as Maisongrosse (uncredited)
- True to Life (1943) as Kapopolis (uncredited)
- Shine On, Harvest Moon (1944) as Romero (uncredited)
- Tampico (1944) as Naval Commander (uncredited)
- The Purple Heart (1944)
- The Falcon in Mexico (1944) as Manuel Romero
- Kismet (1944) as Captain of the Police (uncredited)
- Music for Millions (1944) as Willie – Bartender (uncredited)
- A Medal for Benny (1945) as Frank Alviso (uncredited)
- Salome, Where She Danced (1945) as Panatela
- Nob Hill (1945) as Luigi a Bar Owner (uncredited)
- A Thousand and One Nights (1945) as Kahim
- The Southerner (1945) as Bartender
- Along the Navajo Trail (1945) as Janza
- Sensation Hunters (1945) as Lew Davis
- Cornered (1945) as Police Official (uncredited)
- Road to Utopia (1945) as McGurk
- Fear (1946) as Detective Shaefer
- Badman's Territory (1946) as Sam Bass
- The Well Groomed Bride (1946) as Fernandez (uncredited)
- Suspense (1946) as Man with Blonde (uncredited)
- The Last Crooked Mile (1946) as Ferrara
- Humoresque (1946) as Orchestra Leader
- The Lone Wolf in Mexico (1947) as Police Capt. Carlos Rodriguez
- Ramrod (1947) as Curley
- Shoot to Kill (1947) as Gus Miller
- Carnival in Costa Rica (1947) as Padre Rafael
- A Likely Story (1947) as Tiny
- The Trouble with Women (1947) as 2nd Tony – the Waiter (uncredited)
- Robin Hood of Monterey (1947) as The Alcalde
- Road to Rio (1947) as Cardoso
- Adventures of Casanova (1948) as Prefecture of Police
- Angels' Alley (1948) as Tony 'Piggy' Locarno
- Mr. Blandings Builds His Dream House (1948) as Joe Apollonio
- Mr. Reckless (1948) as Gus
- Joan of Arc (1948) as Henri le Royer, Catherine's husband
- The Paleface (1948) as Patient #2
- Alias Nick Beal (1949) as Karl
- Bride of Vengeance (1949) as Mayor
- Señor Droopy (1949, Short) as Bullfight Announcer (voice, uncredited)
- Follow Me Quietly (1949) as Benny
- Mighty Joe Young (1949) as Brown
- Rope of Sand (1949) as Ship's Captain (uncredited)
- Oh, You Beautiful Doll (1949) as Lucca (deleted scenes)
- The Inspector General (1949) as Gregor (uncredited)
- Young Man with a Horn (1950) as Louis Galba
- Guilty of Treason (1950) as Mátyás Rákosi
- I Was a Shoplifter (1950) as Deputy Sheriff Gomez
- Larápios (1950) as Deputy Sheriff Gomez
- Fortunes of Captain Blood (1950) as Spanish Ship Captain (uncredited)
- The Desert Hawk (1950) as Abdul (uncredited)
- Flame of Stamboul (1951) as Joe Octavian
- The Great Caruso (1951) as Egisto Barretto
- Jim Thorpe – All-American (1951) as Hiram Thorpe (uncredited)
- A Millionaire for Christy (1951) as Mr. Rapello
- The Lady Pays Off (1951) as Manuel
- On Dangerous Ground (1951) as Bagganierri (uncredited)
- My Favorite Spy (1951) as Fire Chief
- Double Dynamite (1951) as 'Hot Horse' Harris, the Bookie
- Phone Call from a Stranger (1952) as Carl – Headwaiter (uncredited)
- Viva Zapata! (1952) as New General (uncredited)
- 5 Fingers (1952) as Turkish Ambassador (uncredited)
- The Fabulous Senorita (1952) as José Rodriguez
- With a Song in My Heart (1952) as Lisbon Surgeon (uncredited)
- Mara Maru (1952) as Capt. Van Hoten (uncredited)
- Diplomatic Courier (1952) as Train Conductor (uncredited)
- South Pacific Trail (1952) as Carlos Alvarez
- April in Paris (1952) as Ship Captain (uncredited)
- What's Sweepin' (1953, Short) as Wally Walrus / Strongman (voice, uncredited)
- The Bandits of Corsica (1953) as Lorenzo
- Call Me Madam (1953) as Miccoli (uncredited)
- Split Second (1953) as Pete (uncredited)
- I, the Jury (1953) as Manuel
- Prisoners of the Casbah (1953) as Marouf
- Killer Ape (1953) as Andrews
- Jivaro (1954) as Jacques
- Creature from the Black Lagoon (1954) as Captain Lucas
- Casanova's Big Night (1954) as Gnocchi
- Alley to Bali (1954) as Volcano Idol Voice (voice, uncredited)
- The Desperado (1954) as Captain Jake Thornton
- Thunder Pass (1954) as Daniel Slaughter
- Four Guns to the Border (1954) as Greasy
- New York Confidential (1955) as Martinelli
- Revenge of the Creature (1955) as Lucas
- All That Heaven Allows (1955) as Manuel
- Tarantula (1955) as Sheriff Jack Andrews
- Hell on Frisco Bay (1956) as Louis Fiaschetti
- Comanche (1956) as Puffer
- The First Texan (1956) as Priest (uncredited)
- Scandal Incorporated (1956) as Leland Miller
- The Mole People (1956) as Prof. Etienne Lafarge
- The Wild Party (1956) as Branson
- Ride the High Iron (1956) as Yard Boss
- The Guns of Fort Petticoat (1957) as Tortilla
- Ten Thousand Bedrooms (1957) as Alfredo, the Jeweler (uncredited)
- Les Girls (1957) as Spanish Peasant (uncredited)
- Outcasts of the City (1958) as Pastor Skira
- The Deep Six (1958) as Pappa Tatos
- The Lady Takes a Flyer (1958) as Childreth
- The Left Handed Gun (1958) as Pete Maxwell
- The Case Against Brooklyn (1958) as Finelli
- Alias Jesse James (1959) as Grigsby (uncredited)
- Pier 5, Havana (1959) as Lopez
- The Purple Gang (1959) as Laurence Orlofsky
- Vice Raid (1959) as Frank Burke
- The Bramble Bush (1960) as Pete Madruga (uncredited)
- Can-Can (1960) as Bailiff
- Go Naked in the World (1961) as Greek Friend of Pete's (uncredited)
- Gold of the Seven Saints (1961) as Gondora Henchman
- Frontier Uprising (1961) as Don Carlos Montalvo
- Atlantis, the Lost Continent (1961) as Megalos (uncredited)
- The Four Horsemen of the Apocalypse (1962) as Miguel
- The Wild Westerners (1962) as Governor John Bullard
- The Three Stooges in Orbit (1962) as Martian Chairman
- Girls! Girls! Girls! (1962) as Arthur Morgan (uncredited)
- California (1963) as Gen. Micheltorena
- The Madmen of Mandoras (1963) as Police Chief Alaniz
- The Ballad of a Gunfighter (1963) as Padre
- Jesse James Meets Frankenstein's Daughter (1966) as Saloon Owner
- Let's Kill Uncle (1966) as Steward
- The Spirit Is Willing (1967) as Felicity's Father

=== Television ===
- The Lone Ranger (1950–1954, TV Series) as Juan Pedro Cardoza / Juan Branco
- Zorro (1957–1961) as Teo Gonzales – Innkeeper / Teo Gonzales / Señor Pacheco – Innkeeper
- Sea Hunt (1961, TV Series) as Tio Ramon Delgado
- The Andy Griffith Show (1963, TV Series) as Big Jack Anderson
- Gunsmoke (1965, TV Series) as Barman Daller
- Burke's Law (1965, TV Series) as Dr. Gonzales / Padre Emiliano
- Daniel Boone (1965, TV Series) as Menewa
- Get Smart (1965, TV Series) as Doorman
- I Spy (1966, TV Series) as Del Gado
- The Addams Family (1966, TV Series) as Captain Grimby
