= Estelita Rodriguez =

Cuban actress (1928–1966)

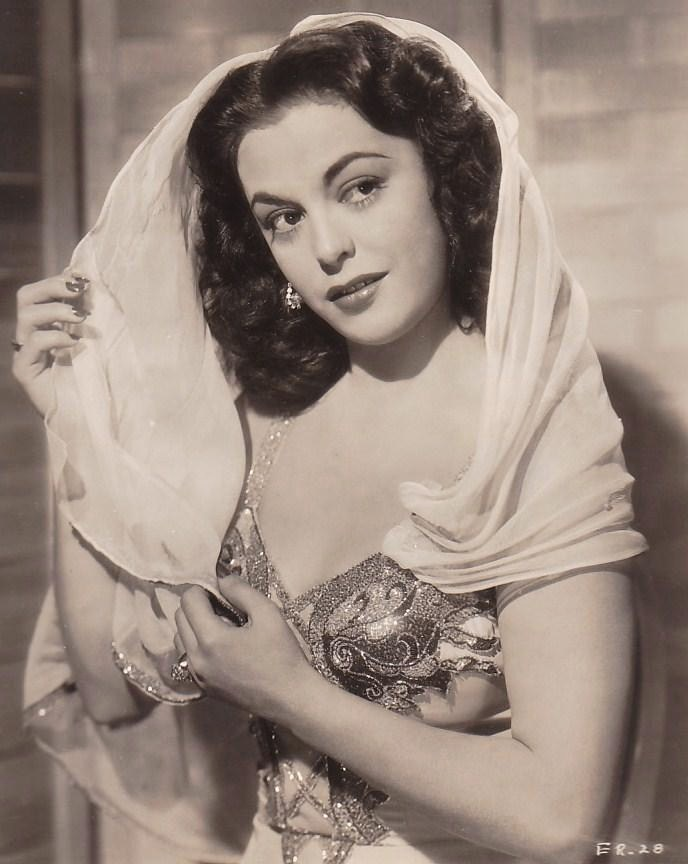
- Rodriguez in 1950
- Born: July 2, 1925; Guanajay, Republic of Cuba
- Died: March 12, 1966 (aged 40); Los Angeles, California, U.S.
- Resting place: San Fernando Mission Cemetery
- Occupation: Actress
- Years active: 1945–1966
- Spouses: Chu-Chu Martinez (m. 1945; div. 1947); Grant Withers (m. 1953; div. 1955); Ismael Alfonso Halfss (m. 1956; div. 1960); Ricardo A. Pego (m. 1961)
- Children: 1

Estelita Rodriguez (July 2, 1925 – March 12, 1966) was a Cuban actress best known for her roles in many Westerns with Roy Rogers for Republic Pictures, as well as her role in Howard Hawks' Rio Bravo. Her birth date was in dispute; studio biographies claimed 1928, but her wedding announcement of May 1945 cited her age as 19 as certified before a superior court judge, which would place her year of birth at 1925.

== Career ==
In 1940, Rodriguez was a 15-year-old nightclub star, singing and dancing with Cuban pianist and bandleader Anselmo Sacasas and his Royal Havana Orchestra. They became so popular that Chicago's Colony Club redecorated its entire premises with a Cuban motif. Reporter Will Davidson raved about Rodriguez: "This raven-haired vocalist sings as much with her eyes and hands and her entire body as she does with her voice. She speaks no English, but the language of her saucy looks and gestures is universal."

Rodriguez returned to her native Havana and became a radio star. Her singing partner at the microphone was singer Rene Cabell, over station CMQ. Cabell and she were hired by Havana's Saica Films to appear in a two-reel movie short, Cuban Rhythms. She was featured at New York's famous Copacabana when she won a contract with Metro-Goldwyn-Mayer (MGM) at the age of 17. She took MGM's regimented talent course, in preparation to appear in pictures. As she recalled in 1949, "I always complained of headaches and asked to go to the studio hospital. Instead, I wandered around the lot looking for movie stars." She never did make a picture at MGM.

Rodriguez went back to New York until 1945, when she signed with Republic Pictures for an appearance in the feature film Mexicana starring Tito Guízar, Constance Moore, and Leo Carrillo. Republic then signed her to a movie contract. She was subsequently cast in Along the Navajo Trail (1945), her first Roy Rogers film. She ultimately appeared in nine Roy Rogers pictures.

She was working at Hollywood's Mocambo nightclub when Republic signed her to a new starring contract with annual options. Her first starring role was in Belle of Old Mexico (1949). Syndicated columnist Erskine Johnson reported, "She's 22 [sic] but wishes she was 26. 'Everyone treats me like a kid. I am a mother.' She hopes the studio doesn't ballyhoo her as a Latin bombshell. 'There are too many Latin bombshells, I think.' She dotes on prizefights: 'I get so excited I go into the ring and help him.' Lupe Vélez used to do the same thing. As a matter of fact Estelita, with a little more effort, could be another Lupe."

By 1951, she had indeed become a new Lupe Vélez, starring in Republic's hectic musical comedies such as Cuban Fireball (1951) and Havana Rose (1951). She was billed variously as Estelita Rodriguez or (in her last four Republic pictures) simply Estelita. After her Republic contract lapsed, she resumed her successful nightclub career.

Later, Rodriguez worked in a few additional films for Paramount, MGM, and Embassy Pictures, including Rio Bravo in 1959. She also worked in television, making guest appearances. That same year, Gene Autry announced plans to film the story of Fidel Castro's sister-in-law Deborah, then in the news as a fighter during the Cuban revolt. Autry cast Estelita Rodriguez in the leading role, but the film was never made.

Again she returned to nightclubs, touring Australia and then Canada.

== Marital history ==
Estelita Rodriguez was married four times.

During a nightclub engagement in Havana, 19-year-old Estelita Rodriguez met Mexican singer Chu-Chu Martinez. They were married in Los Angeles on May 14, 1945 by superior court judge Edward R. Brand. The couple had one child, Nina (born 1946), before divorcing in 1947. She commented on so-called Latin lovers: "They tell you to stay home and then they go out."

In November 1950, Rodriguez met actor Grant Withers, 20 years her senior and having married four times, when they appeared together in a San Francisco charity show to entertain 7,000 wounded veterans. Withers and Rodriguez were married in Reno on January 31, 1953. They separated on September 23, 1954, and Withers attempted suicide the next day. She sued for divorce on November 30, 1954.

Her third marriage was to Ismael Alfonso Halfss in 1956; they divorced in 1960. She said her husband was so stingy that he told her to stop buying cold cream and use olive oil, instead. "I told him I am no salad," she testified.

Her fourth and final marriage was to Dr. Ricardo A. Pego in 1961. They remained married until her death.

== Production company ==
The ambitious Estelita Rodriguez formed Caribe Cine, Ltd., her own independent production company. Recognizing that she was best known for her Lupe Vélez-styled comedies, she bought the screen rights to Spitfire, Clyde Ware's book biography of Vélez, while the manuscript was in galley proofs. Rodriguez planned a new feature film starring herself as Vélez, with author Ware writing the screenplay and her old friend William Beaudine of the Republic features directing. Beaudine was reunited with Rodriguez in 1965 for the filming of Jesse James Meets Frankenstein's Daughter (released 1966). The Lupe Vélez project never moved forward, due to Rodriguez's untimely death. (Ware's book was due for paperback publication in January 1966, but evidently never saw print.)

On March 12, 1966, Estelita Rodriguez Pego was found dead on the kitchen floor of her home near North Hollywood in Van Nuys, California. She was 40. No autopsy was performed. Columnist Walter Winchell reported: "Local Latins are still mourning the sudden death of Estelita Rodriguez, a flu victim. She started as a Copa singer and skyrocketed to movie musical stardom." She is interred at San Fernando Mission Cemetery, Mission Hills, California.

== Popular culture ==
Serena Burdick's 2021 novel Find Me in Havana is a novel based on Rodriguez.

== Filmography ==
Year	Title	Role	Notes
1941	Cuban Rhythms	Herself	short subject, produced in Havana
1945	Mexicana	Lupita	
1945	Along the Navajo Trail	Narita	
1945	Vidas Solidárias		
1947	On the Old Spanish Trail	Lolita	
1948	The Gay Ranchero	Consuelo Belmonte	
1948	Old Los Angeles	Estelita Del Rey	
1949	Susanna Pass	Rita	
1949	The Golden Stallion	Pepé Valdez	
1950	Belle of Old Mexico	Rosita Dominguez	first starring role
1950	Federal Agent at Large	Lopita	
1950	Twilight in the Sierras	Lola Chavez	
1950	Sunset in the West	Carmelita	
1950	Hit Parade of 1951	Chicquita	
1950	California Passage	Maria Sanchez	
1951	Cuban Fireball	Estelita	
1951	In Old Amarillo	Pepita Martinez	
1951	Havana Rose	Estelita DeMarco	
1951	Pals of the Golden West	Elena Madera	
1952	South Pacific Trail	Elena Madera	
1952	The Fabulous Senorita	Estelita Rodriguez	
1952	Tropical Heat Wave	Estelita	
1953	Tropic Zone	Elena Estebar	
1953	Sweethearts on Parade	Lolita Lamont	last for Republic
1959	Rio Bravo	Consuela Robante	
1959	Alcoa Presents: One Step Beyond ('The Inheritance ', episode)	Nina	(broadcast 27th. Oct., US)
1966	Jesse James Meets Frankenstein's Daughter	Juanita Lopez	(final film role)
