= Grant Withers =

American actor (1905–1959)

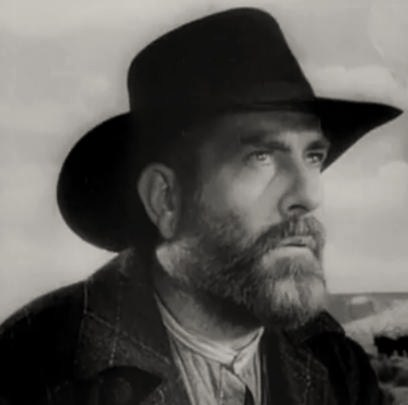
- Withers in Fort Apache (1948)
- Born: Granville Gustavus Withers; January 17, 1905; Pueblo, Colorado, U.S.
- Died: March 27, 1959 (aged 54); North Hollywood, Los Angeles, California, U.S.
- Resting place: Forest Lawn Memorial Park, Glendale, California
- Occupation: Actor
- Years active: 1925–1959
- Spouses: Shirley Paschal (m. 192?; div. 192?); Loretta Young (m. 1930; annul. 1931): Gladys Joyce Walsh (m. 1933; div. 19??); Estelita Rodriguez (m. 1953; div. 1955)

Granville Gustavus Withers (January 17, 1905 – March 27, 1959), known professionally as Grant Withers, was an American film actor. He began working in motion pictures during the last years of the silent era. Withers moved into sound films, establishing himself with a list of headlined features as a young and handsome male lead. Historian Terry Rowan writes, "As his career progressed ... his importance diminished, but he did manage a 10-year contract with Republic."

His friendships with both John Ford and John Wayne secured him a spot in nine of Wayne's films, but later roles dwindled to supporting roles, mainly as villains in B-movies, serials, and television.

== Early life and career ==
"Born in Pueblo, Colorado, Withers worked as an oil company salesman and newspaper reporter before breaking into films near the end of the silent era." His more-than-30-year acting career took off in the late 1920s. While in his twenties, he was a leading man over rising talent James Cagney in Other Men's Women (1931).

The comedy short So Long Bill (1926) marked Withers's film debut.

Withers's early work had him opposite actors such as W.C. Fields, Buster Keaton, Boris Karloff, Mae West, and Shirley Temple. Appearing in The Red-Haired Alibi (1932) with Temple, he played the role of her first on-screen parent.

Starring roles in major pictures later dwindled to supporting parts, mainly as villains in B-movies and serials. Notable exceptions included two starring roles in serials for Universal, Jungle Jim and Radio Patrol (both 1937); and the recurring role of the brash police captain Bill Street in Monogram Pictures' five-film Mr. Wong series, starring Boris Karloff, beginning in 1938. He was under a Republic Pictures contract from February 1944 through April 1954. Withers's credits at Republic total about 60 films from 1937 to 1957.

After 1940, he was a character actor and tough guy in Westerns. He took numerous supporting roles in television as his popularity in films waned. He guest-starred as baseball coach Whitey Martin in the 1956 episode "The Comeback" on Crossroads. He was cast as Gus Andrews and Miles Breck, respectively, in two episodes, titled "The time for All Good Men" (1957) and "King of the Frontier" (1958), on The Life and Legend of Wyatt Earp, starring Hugh O'Brian.

In 1956, he played "Jed Lardner" (a callous cowboy who left his injured partner to die) in S2E15, "Pucket's New Year", on the TV Western Gunsmoke. In 1958, Withers portrayed wealthy rancher Sam Barton in the episode "The Return of Dr. Thackeray" of Have Gun — Will Travel. He also appeared in two other Have Gun — Will Travel episodes. That year, he played Charles Stewart Brent, owner of the Brent Building in Los Angeles, where Perry Mason had his office, and the defendant in the Perry Mason episode "The Case of the Gilded Lily."

In 1959, shortly before his death, Withers was cast in the episode "Feeling His Oats" on the children's Western series Fury, starring Peter Graves and Bobby Diamond. He also appeared that year as Sheriff Charlie Clayton in the episode "A Matter of Friendship" in John Bromfield's crime drama U.S. Marshal. His last film role was in the 1959 Roger Corman crime drama I Mobster. His last TV role, also in 1959, was as Ed Martin in "The Ringer" episode of the Rory Calhoun Western series The Texan.

In total, Withers appeared in some 200 film and television roles.

== Personal life ==
In 1930, he eloped to Yuma, Arizona, with 17-year-old actress Loretta Young. The marriage ended in annulment in 1931 just as their second movie together, titled Too Young to Marry, was released. He also was married to Gladys Joyce Walsh.

Some of Withers's later screen appearances were arranged through the auspices of his friends John Ford and John Wayne. He appeared in nine movies with John Wayne, including Fort Apache (1948) and Rio Grande (1950).

Withers met Cuban-born entertainer Estelita Rodriguez while both were performing in a benefit show in 1950. Withers and Rodriguez were married in Reno on January 31, 1953, with John Wayne as best man. It was an unhappy union, and Withers and Rodriguez separated on September 23, 1954. Withers attempted suicide the next day. She sued for divorce on November 30, 1954.

== Illness and death ==
A noticeable weight gain became apparent in his films as his career progressed. In later years, back problems were among his health issues.

In failing health, Withers committed suicide by overdosing on barbiturates on March 27, 1959, in his Hollywood apartment. He was 54. Withers left a suicide note that read: "Please forgive me, my family. I was so unhappy. It's better this way." He is interred at Forest Lawn Memorial Park in Glendale, California.

== Selected filmography ==
Year	Title	Role	Notes
1926	Fighting Hearts	Tod Raleigh	
1926	The Gentle Cyclone	Wilkes Junior	
1928	Golden Shackles	Frank Fordyce	
1928	Bringing Up Father	Dennis	
1929	The Time, the Place and the Girl	Jim Crane	
1929	The Greyhound Limited	Bill	
1929	In the Headlines	Nosey Norton	
1929	So Long Letty	Harry Miller	
1930	Soldiers and Women	Captain Clive Branch	
1930	The Other Tomorrow	Jim Carter	
1930	Sinner's Holiday	Angel Harrigan	
1931	Other Men's Women	Bill White	
1931	Swanee River	Garry	
1932	The Gambling Sex	Bill Foster	
1935	The Fighting Marines	Cpl. Larry Lawrence	
1935	The Test	Brule Conway	
1935	Skybound	Chet Morley	
1935	Goin' To Town	Cowboy	
1935	Rip Roaring Riley	Major Gray	
1936	The Arizona Raiders	Monroe Adams	
1937	Jungle Jim	Jim 'Jungle Jim' Bradley	Serial
1937	Bill Cracks Down	"Tons" Walker	
1937	Hollywood Round-Up	Grant Drexel	
1938	Mr. Wong – Mr. Wong, Detective	Capt. William 'Bill' Street	
1939	Mr. Wong – Mr. Wong in Chinatown	Capt. William 'Bill' Street	
1939	Daughter of the Tong	Ralph Dickson	
1939	Navy Secrets	Steve Roberts	
1940	Mr. Wong – Fatal Hour	Capt. William 'Bill' Street	
1940	Mr. Wong – Doomed to Die	Capt. William 'Bill' Street	
1940	Mr. Wong – Phantom of Chinatown	Capt. William 'Bill' Street	
1943	In Old Oklahoma	Richardson	
1943	Petticoat Larceny	Detective Hogan	
1944	The Fighting Seabees	Whanger Spreckles	
1944	The Yellow Rose of Texas	Express Agent Lucas	
1946	My Darling Clementine	Ike Clanton	
1947	Tycoon	Fog Harris	
1948	Fort Apache	Silas Meacham	
1948	Wake of the Red Witch	Capt. Wilde Youngeur	
1950	Bells of Coronado	Craig Bennett	
1950	Rio Grande	Deputy Marshal	
1952	Tropical Heat Wave	Norman James	
1953	Fair Wind to Java	Jason Blue	
1954	Jubilee Trail	Maj. Lynden	Uncredited
1955	Run for Cover	Gentry	
1955	Lady Godiva of Coventry	Pendar	
1956	The White Squaw	Sheriff	
1957	Hell's Crossroads	Sheriff Steve Oliver	
1957	The Last Stagecoach West	Jack Fergus	
1959	I Mobster	Paul Moran	
