= John MacBurnie =

American cinematographer

- Born: December 18, 1892; New York City, United States
- Died: September 24, 1956 (aged 63); Los Angeles, California, United States
- Occupation: Cinematographer
- Years active: 1928–1966 (film)

John MacBurnie (December 18, 1892 – September 24, 1956) was an American cinematographer. He worked on more than a hundred films during his career.

== Selected filmography ==
- Unaccustomed As We Are (1929)
- Heart of Virginia (1948)
- Ghost of Zorro (1949)
- Bells of Coronado (1950)
- Tarnished (1950)
- Twilight in the Sierras (1950)
- Code of the Silver Sage (1950)
- Harbor of Missing Men (1950)
- Women from Headquarters (1950)
- Salt Lake Raiders (1950)
- Trial Without Jury (1950)
- California Passage (1950)
- The Dakota Kid (1951)
- Colorado Sundown (1952)
- Tropical Heat Wave (1952)
- Down Laredo Way (1953)

== Bibliography ==
- Robert W. Phillips. Roy Rogers: A Biography. McFarland, 1995.
