= Trucolor =

Motion picture color process

Trucolor was a color motion picture process used and owned by the Consolidated Film Industries division of Republic Pictures. It was introduced as a replacement for Consolidated's own Magnacolor process.

Republic used Trucolor mostly for its Westerns, through the 1940s and early 1950s. The premiere Trucolor release was Out California Way (1946) and the last film photographed in the process was Spoilers of the Forest (1957). With the advent of Eastmancolor and Ansco color films, which gave better results at a cheaper price, Trucolor was abandoned, coincidentally at the same time as Republic's demise.

At the time of its introduction, Trucolor was a two-color subtractive color process. About 3 years later, the manufacturer expanded the process to include a three-color release system based on DuPont film stock. They later replaced the DuPont film with Eastman Kodak film stock. Thus, in its lifespan around 12 years, the Trucolor process was in reality three distinct systems for color release prints, all bearing the same “Trucolor” screen credit. Yet, even by 1950, some filmgoers and entertainment publications found Trucolor productions at times deficient and visually distracting due to color inaccuracies. As part of its review of the Roy Rogers “oatuner” Twilight in the Sierras, the influential trade paper Variety stated quite pointedly, “Trucolor tinting adds to the production values despite the overall untrue reproduction of facial and landscape hues.”

== Trucolor process ==
In its original two-color version, Trucolor was a two-strip (red and blue) process based on the earlier work of William Van Doren Kelley's Prizma color process. Trucolor films were shot in bipack, with the two strips of film being sensitized to red and blue. Both negatives were processed on duplitized film, much like Trucolor's rival process Cinecolor. Unlike Cinecolor, however, the film was not dyed with a toner but a color coupler, similar to Eastmancolor film. Because of this chemical composition, Trucolor film fades over time, unlike Cinecolor.

A scene from Romantic Rumbolia (1949). On the left is the original film as it is today (faded) and as it originally looked (color corrected).

Three-color Trucolor was first used in 1949, for making prints of cartoons photographed in the "successive exposure" process, in which each animation cel was photographed three times, on three sequential frames, behind alternating red, green, and blue filters. They used multilayer Du Pont Color Release Positive Film for the release print material.

DuPont supplied the stock for Trucolor's three-color process between 1949 and 1953. Prints after 1953 were on Eastman color print stock 5382, and at that point, the name "Trucolor" became synonymous with other trade names for Eastmancolor processing.

Republic Pictures introduced live-action three-color Trucolor with the release of the Judy Canova musical comedy Honeychile in 1951. Kodak Eastmancolor negatives were used for principal photography. DuPont positive stock (type 875) was used to make release prints. This stock had a monopack structure that used synthetic polymer rather than gelatin as a color former.

== Trucolor films ==
Though renowned for being used in Roy Rogers and other Westerns, Republic used Trucolor in a variety of films. The 61-minute live-action feature Bill and Coo (1948) was filmed in Trucolor and received a special Academy Award. Such recognition kept industry personnel interested in the ongoing refinement of the Trucolor process and its use in other films by Republic. In 1949 in New York City, Showmen’s Trade Review—“The Service Paper of The Motion Picture Industry”—reported the following:

Republic has scheduled two additional Trucolor productions to go before the cameras before the end of the year, making a total of 12 pictures to have utilized Republic’s color process during the year. The two planned Trucolor features are a Roy Rogers film, “Trigger, Jr.”, slated for a Nov. 28 start, and a comedy romance starring Estelita Rodriguez, now being prepared for late November production. One Trucolor picture, “Singing Guns,” is now being filmed.

Director John Ford in 1951 filmed a Korean War documentary in Trucolor, This is Korea. Republic also used the process for The Last Command, an epic portrayal of the Battle of the Alamo. In that 1955 production the Mexican army uniforms were tailored in sky-blue fabrics to improve their appearance on the screen. Montana Belle, a Western starring Jane Russell as outlaw Belle Starr, was filmed in Trucolor in 1948 by independent producer Howard Welsch. The picture was intended for release by Republic; however, it was bought back by RKO, to whom Russell was under contract, and was not released by that studio until 1952.

Republic also made a South Seas adventure Fair Wind to Java (1953), which climaxed with the explosion of Krakatoa. Nicholas Ray used Trucolor for his offbeat 1954 western, Johnny Guitar. Trucolor went on location as well to Europe as William Dieterle filmed the life of Richard Wagner in Magic Fire (1956) and Portugal featured in the potboiler Lisbon (1956) directed by and starring Ray Milland. Republic made a John Ford American culture-type film in the process, Come Next Spring (1956). John Ford, though, refused to film The Quiet Man (1952) in Trucolor despite the fact that Republic's head Herbert J. Yates insisted that the process be used. Ford’s refusal prevailed, for Technicolor was employed for The Quiet Man.

== Trucolor short subjects ==
In addition to feature films, Republic commissioned Robert Clampett to make one cartoon in Trucolor, It's a Grand Old Nag. From 1952 to 1955 Republic released a series of 32 travelogues in Trucolor called This World of Ours produced by Carl Dudley. The studio also commissioned Leonard L. Levinson to make four limited animation cartoon satiric travelogues called Jerky Journeys using the process. The live-action travelogue Carnival in Munich, written by Sloan Nibley, and Zanzabuku, filmed in Africa by Lewis Cotlow, are two other Trucolor productions.

== See also ==
- Color motion picture film
- List of color film systems
- List of motion picture film formats
