= Stanley Wilson (composer) =

American composer (1915-1970)

- Born: November 25, 1917; New York City, United States
- Died: July 12, 1970 (aged 52) Aspen, Colorado, United States
- Genres: Film and television music scoring
- Occupations: Arranger, composer, conductor, director
- Years active: 1947–1970

Stanley Wilson (November 25, 1917 – July 12, 1970) was an American musical conductor, arranger and film composer. Wilson was one of the most prolific collaborators in the Hollywood music industry for more than three decades. The creator of original themes and incidental music for several TV series, he also composed, arranged, or orchestrated more than 100 films. Wilson is considered "truly outstanding and most deservedly well loved of all the music directors".

== Early life ==
Stanley James Wilson was born on November 25, 1917, in Long Beach, New York, the youngest of Regina (née Reiman) and Philip Wilson's four children: Nancy, Ruth, Mitchell, Stanley. Wilson's father had emigrated from Russia, his mother emigrated from Vienna, Austria. Wilson's parents had a brief career in the Yiddish Shakespeare Theatre.

Wilson had his first trumpet recital at the age of five and was a trumpet player in a police band at 7. Wilson graduated early from Townsend Harris High School at the age of 14. He attended City College of New York, enrolling in a pre-med program. By the age of 16 he was playing trumpet on 52nd Street with Bobby Hackett and Nick's in Greenwich Village with Spud Murphy. During the latter part of his third year at City College, at the age of 17, Wilson decided he wanted to make music, not medicine, his career, dropping out in 1937.

Wilson was influenced by Edwin Franko Goldman of the Goldman band, Walter Damrosch, then conductor of the New York Symphony Orchestra and studied orchestration with Nathan Van Cleave. Wilson was playing and arranging for Art Paulsen's band at the New Yorker Hotel when he met his future wife Gertrud who was from New Jersey and had been working at the World's Fair as a hostess. A month after their marriage in 1941 he auditioned for Glenn Miller. He received a call to join the Miller orchestra. By that time Wilson had joined the Eddie Brandt band. Wilson joined Herbie Holmes' orchestra in 1941, making his first trip to the West Coast with that group. He joined two uncles who had left New York for the film business in Hollywood. One of the uncles and his godfather, Joseph Ruttenberg was an Oscar-winning MGM cinematographer (The Great Waltz, Mrs. Miniver, Somebody Up There Likes Me, Gigi). Wilson was with the Freddie Martin Orchestra for three years, playing trumpet and arranging at the Coconut Grove in Los Angeles.

== Motion picture career ==
Wilson was one of the most prolific collaborators in the Hollywood music industry for more than three decades. The creator of original themes and incidental music for several TV series, he also composed, arranged, or orchestrated more than 100 films.

=== MGM Studios ===
Following World War II, he joined the MGM music department in 1945. Moving to Republic Pictures a year later, Wilson composed the film soundtracks for all Republic Westerns and serials in the late 1940s and early 1950s. Wilson was in charge of supplying music for every Republic production.

=== Republic Studios ===
Wilson wrote scores for countless B-movies and serials for the next twelve years. While at Republic, he provided the music support for classic serials as King of the Rocket Men and Zombies of the Stratosphere, as well in exciting adventures featuring western heroes as Rex Allen, Wild Bill Elliott, Allan Lane and Roy Rogers.

== Television career ==
=== Revue Studios ===
In 1953, Wilson became the music supervisor of Revue Studios production unit. Wilson stayed on when it became Universal Studios. As head of creative activities, Wilson was in charge of overseeing the creation of the music for all of the studio's productions. Wilson hired and assigned projects to different composers, arrangers, orchestrators and conductors. Wilson was one of the first to hire composers and musicians without regard to their cultural diversity. Wilson integrated television music. As an executive, Wilson employed significant composers as Pete Rugolo, John Williams, Elmer Bernstein, Juan García Esquivel, Dave Grusin, Quincy Jones, Henry Mancini, Oliver Nelson and Lalo Schifrin, among others.

Composer Jerry Goldsmith worked within Wilson's creative environment at Revue. Goldsmith said of the time there that Wilson allowed him much creative latitude. He said "Stanley was great and he loved all of us...They were all trying to outdo each other, and he gave us...free rein to do whatever we wanted to do and the crazier and the wilder we got...again, it was the same old thing. If you didn’t do it this week...next week. One week you’d hit a home run and then next week you’d strike out, but we were always trying something different." Quick turnarounds were a constant concern and a constant challenge. Goldsmith said “On Thriller, you’d get the show on Friday and have to record it Monday morning".

=== Universal Studios ===
The composer John Williams remembered working for Wilson, saying "In 1960, at Universal Studios, (music supervisor) Stanley Wilson had a music department. In the hallway there, there were five or six rooms, little rooms with no windows. And each room had a little piano and on any given day I would be in one room, Jerry Goldsmith in the next one, Lalo Schifrin in the next one, Quincy Jones in the next one, Morty Stevens, also Conrad Salinger and the late Bernard Hermann, who made it his home for a couple of years and wrote some great music and drove everyone crazy. It was a situation where we taught each other and learned from each other and it was a group effort that produced the results that each one of us was able to accomplish.”

In 1964, MCA formed Universal City Studios, Inc., merging the motion pictures and television arms of Universal Pictures Company and Revue Productions.

Toward the end of his career with Universal, as head of creative activities of the Motion Picture and Television Music Department of Universal City Studios, he began to dedicate more of his own time to specific shows, composing themes and much of the background music for It Takes A Thief, The Bold Ones, Ironsides, Columbo, Marcus Welby MD, among others. In 1955, Wilson wrote an arrangement of Gounod's "Funeral March of a Marionette" as the theme music for Alfred Hitchcock Presents.

Wilson also was the music director for M Squad, the police series starring Lee Marvin, working in collaboration with Count Basie, Sonny Burke, Pete Carpenter, Benny Carter and John Williams. Wilson composed the theme music for the first season, winning the 1959 Grammy Award for the Best Soundtrack Album and Background Score from Motion Picture or Television. Wilson said at the time, "There is nothing new about jazz. But there is plenty new about using it to underscore exciting action on the TV screen. A show like M Squad is supposed to move; jazz moves. I feel we have the best marriage of drama and jazz music in show business".

For the second and third seasons, he entrusted Basie to compose a new theme. Wilson, along with Esquivel, composed the now famous Revue Studios/Universal Television fanfare, which lasted for nearly three decades.

Wilson traveled to France in 1963 to record the soundtrack to the television special, Princess Grace's Monaco. After the shooting was finished, he arranged and conducted The World of Sights and Sounds, Stop One: Paris, an album of French standards. This time Wilson was accompanied by a small jazz combo fronted by M Squad colleague and jazz legend, Benny Carter, and included a string section orchestra and a wordless vocal choir led by Michel Legrand's sister, Christiane.

In 1967 Wilson co-produced, with Robert Wagner, a documentary film of the International Music Festival in Rio de Janeiro, entitled The World Goes On. It was to be a pilot for the documentation of music festivals worldwide.

In 1969, Wilson collaborated with composer, arranger Oliver Nelson on the album, Black, Brown and Beautiful, described as, 'A stirring tribute to Dr. Martin Luther King that is as searching and angry as it is contemplative and compassionate'.

== Death and legacy ==
Wilson died of a heart attack in Aspen, Colorado, at the age of 52, moments after addressing the 1970 Aspen Music Festival on the subject of composing for films and television. He was survived by Gertrud, his wife of 29 years and their three children: Phyllis Wilson Paul (Westlake Village CA.), Philip Wilson (Kaneohe Hawaii), Peter Wilson.

In 2014 'Stanley Wilson Avenue' was named on the Universal City lot. It is at the location of Stanley's office. John Williams inscribed a commemorative plaque which is installed on Stanley Wilson Avenue to honor his mentor.

== Selected filmography ==
=== Films ===
- The Kid from Cleveland (1949)
- Belle of Old Mexico (1950)
- Federal Agent at Large (1950)
- Gunmen of Abilene (1950)
- Tarnished (1950)
- Twilight in the Sierras (1950)
- Code of the Silver Sage (1950)
- Harbor of Missing Men (1950)
- The Arizona Cowboy (1950)
- Women from Headquarters (1950)
- Salt Lake Raiders (1950)
- The Invisible Monster (1950)
- The Showdown (1950)
- Cuban Fireball (1951)
- The Dakota Kid (1951)
- Havana Rose (1951)
- Insurance Investigator (1951)
- Missing Women (1951)
- Secrets of Monte Carlo (1951)
- Tropical Heat Wave (1952)
- The Fabulous Senorita (1952)
- Down Laredo Way (1953)
- Woman They Almost Lynched (1953)
- Missile Monsters (1958)
- The Killers (1964)
- Two Mules for Sister Sara (1970)

=== Serials ===
- Federal Agents vs. Underworld, Inc. (1949)
- King of the Rocket Men (1949)
- The James Brothers of Missouri (1949)
- Radar Patrol vs Spy King (1949)
- Desperadoes of the West (1950)
- Flying Disc Man from Mars (1950)
- Don Daredevil Rides Again (1951)
- Radar Men from the Moon (1952)
- Zombies of the Stratosphere (1952)
- Canadian Mounties vs. Atomic Invaders (1953)
- King of the Carnival (1955)
- Ghost of Zorro (1959)

=== TV shows ===
- The Adventures of Kit Carson (1951)
- Commando Cody: Sky Marshal of the Universe (1953)
- The Pepsi-Cola Playhouse (1955)
- The Millionaire (1955-1957)
- General Electric Theater (1956-1957)
- Tales of Wells Fargo (1957)
- Alfred Hitchcock Presents (1955-1957)
- M Squad (1957)
- Schlitz Playhouse of Stars (1957–1959)
- Leave It to Beaver (1957–1963)
- Wagon Train (1957–1961, 1963–1964)
- Cimarron City (1958–1959)
- Broken Arrow (1958)
- Buckskin (1958)
- Shotgun Slade (1959)
- Johnny Staccato (1959–1960)
- Markham (1959-1960)
- Riverboat (1959–1961)
- Laramie (1959-1962)
- Overland Trail (1960)
- Bachelor Father (1957–1961)
- Boris Karloff's Thriller (1960–1962)
- Checkmate (1960–1962)
- The New Bob Cummings Show (1961-1962)
- Ripcord (1961)
- 87th Precinct (1962)
- The Alfred Hitchcock Hour (1962–1965)
- The Jack Benny Program (1962–1965)
- McHale's Navy (1962–1966)
- The Virginian (1962–1970)
- Arrest and Trial (1963–1964)
- Kraft Suspense Theatre (1963–1965)
- The Munsters (1964–1966)
- Laredo (1965–1967)
- Run for Your Life (1965–1967)
- Pistols 'n' Petticoats (1966)
- Dragnet 1967 (1967-1969)
- Ironside (1967-1970)
- Adam-12 (1968-1969)
- It Takes a Thief (1968-1970)
- The Bold Ones: The Lawyers (1969-1970)
- The Bold Ones: The New Doctors (1969-1970)
- The Bold Ones: The Protectors (1969-1970)
- Marcus Welby, M.D. (1969-1970)

== Discography ==
- Wilson rarely featured his talent on records, but today some of his albums are classics of space age pop and exotica audiences. This list include:
  - Wagon Train (1957)
  - The Music From M Squad (1959)
  - Themes to Remember (1964)
  - The Lost Man (The Original Soundtrack Album) (1960)
  - Pagan Love (1961)
  - The Great Waltz - American Continental (1961)
  - The World of Sights and Sounds Stop One: Paris (1963)

=== As conductor ===
With Quincy Jones

- The Lost Man (soundtrack) (Uni, 1969)

With Oliver Nelson

- Black, Brown and Beautiful (Flying Dutchman, 1969)
