= Harold Minter =

American film editor

- Born: March 5, 1903; Illinois, United States
- Died: May 13, 2001 (aged 98); Laguna Hills, California; United States
- Occupation: Editor
- Years active: 1933–1966 (film)

Harold Minter (March 5, 1903 – May 13, 2001) was an American film editor. He worked for the Hollywood studio Republic Pictures for a number of years.

== Selected filmography ==
- Daughter of Don Q (1946)
- Train to Alcatraz (1948)
- Trial Without Jury (1950)
- Belle of Old Mexico (1950)
- Tropical Heat Wave (1952)
- Down Laredo Way (1953)
- Phantom Stallion (1954)

== Bibliography ==
- Robert W. Phillips. Roy Rogers: A Biography. McFarland, 1995.
