= Trigger (horse) =

Movie horse (1934–1965)

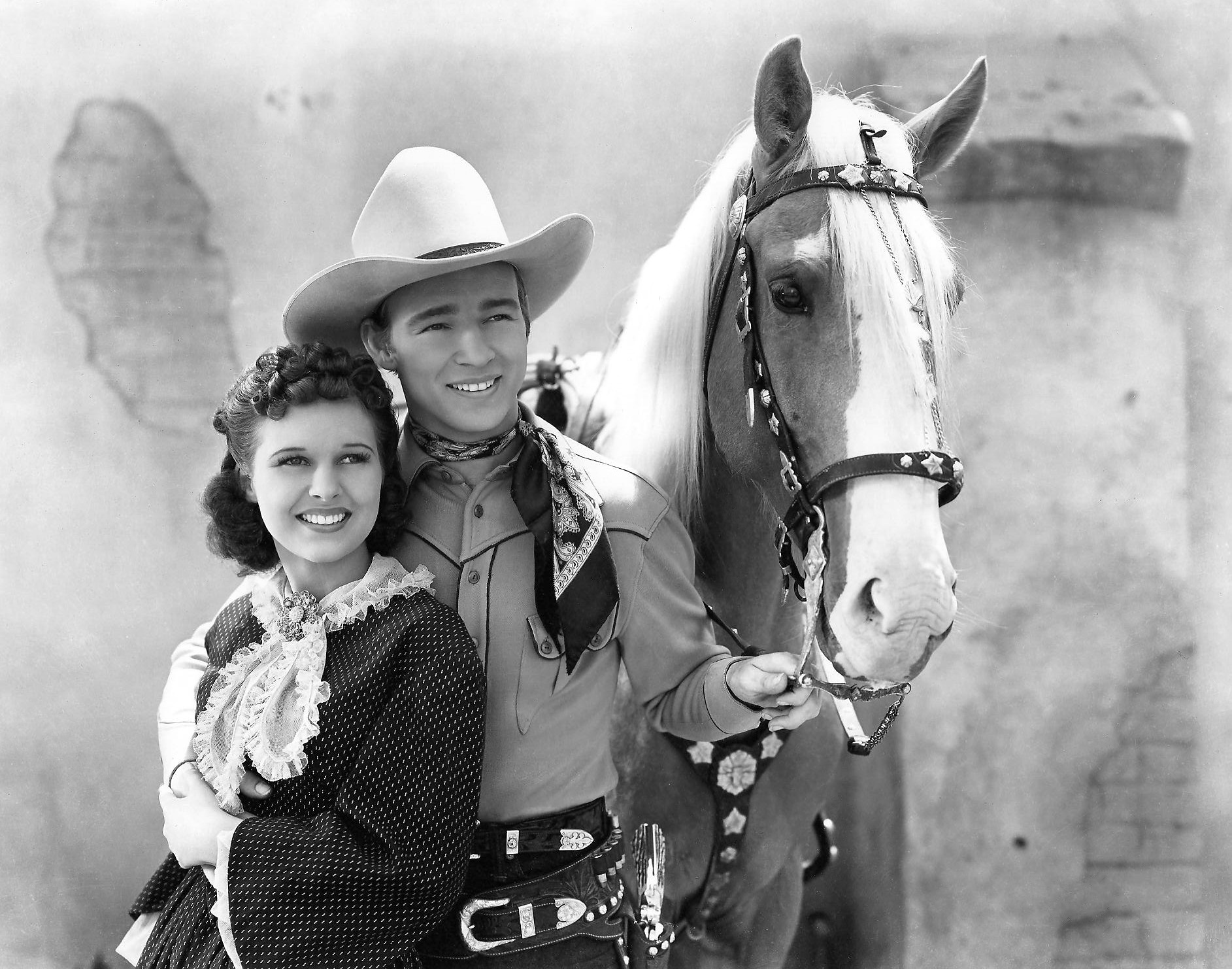
- Roy Rogers and co-star Lynne Roberts with Trigger in the 1938 film Billy the Kid Returns
- Breed: Grade horse
- Discipline: Movie horse
- Sex: Stallion
- Foaled: July 4, 1934
- Died: July 3, 1965 (aged 30)
- Country: United States
- Color: Palomino
- Owner: Roy Rogers

Trigger (July 4, 1934 – July 3, 1965) was a palomino horse who appeared in American Western films with his owner and rider, cowboy star Roy Rogers.

== Pedigree ==
Trigger, originally named Golden Cloud, was a horse born in San Diego, California.

Though often mistaken for a Tennessee Walking Horse, he was sired by a Thoroughbred, with his dam being an unregistered (grade mare which, like Trigger, was a palomino).

Movie director William Witney, who directed Roy Rogers and Trigger in many of their movies, declared that Trigger had a slightly different lineage — that his sire was a "registered" palomino stallion horse (though no known palomino registry existed at the time of Trigger's birth) and that his dam horse was a Thoroughbred, borne of a "cold-blood" mare.

Horses other than Golden Cloud also portrayed "Trigger" over the years, none of which were related to Golden Cloud. The two most prominent of these horses were the palominos "Little Trigger" and "Trigger Jr." (a Tennessee Walking Horse listed as "Allen's Gold Zephyr" in the Tennessee Walking Horse registry).

While the original horse portraying Trigger remained a stallion his entire life, he was never bred and has no descendants. "Trigger Jr."/"Allen's Golden Zephyr", however, was at stud by Roy Rogers for many years.

The horse named "Triggerson", which actor Val Kilmer led on stage as a tribute to Roy Rogers and his cowboy peers during the 71st Academy Awards in March 1999, was reportedly grandsired by Trigger Jr.

== Film career ==
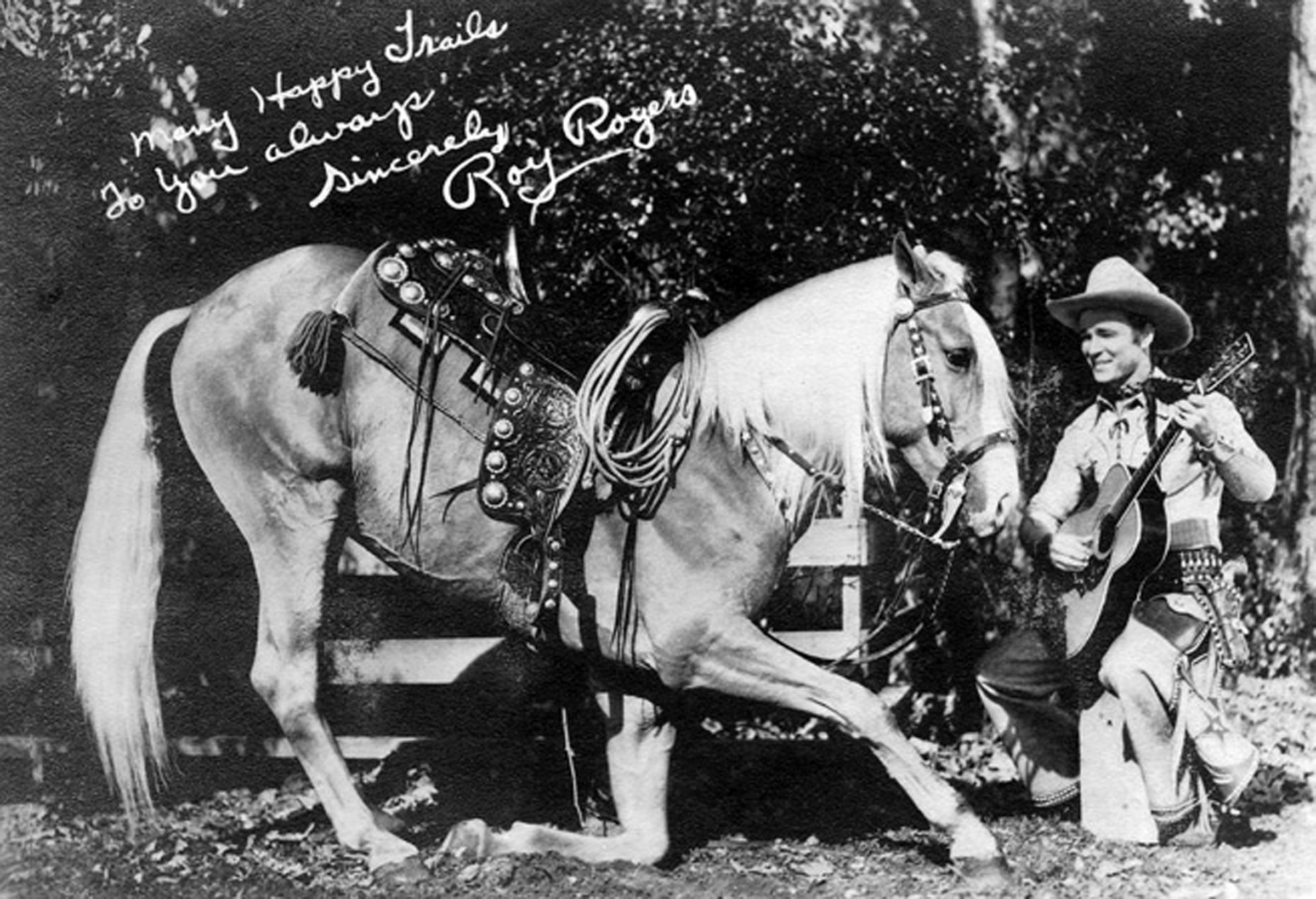
Publicity photo of Roy Rogers and Trigger

Golden Cloud made an early appearance as the mount of Maid Marian, played by Olivia de Havilland in The Adventures of Robin Hood (1938). A short while later, when Roy Rogers was preparing to make his first movie in a starring role, he was offered a choice of five rented "movie" horses to ride and chose Golden Cloud. Rogers bought him eventually in 1943 and renamed him Trigger for his quickness of both foot and mind. Trigger learned 150 trick cues and could walk 50 ft (15 m) on his hind legs (according to sources close to Rogers). They were said to have run out of places to cue Trigger. Trigger became such a ham that as soon as he heard applause, he would start bowing and ruin that trick. He could sit in a chair, sign his name "X" with a pencil, and lie down for a nap and cover himself with a blanket. Rogers' most carefully guarded trade secret was to get Trigger housebroken. "Spending as much time as he does in hotels, theaters, and hospitals, this ability comes in might handy and it's conceded by most trainers to be Trigger's greatest accomplishment." —Glenn Randall, wrangler with Hudkins Stables.

Rogers once purchased a "Best Wishes for the New Year" advertisement in Variety and signed it "Roy Rogers and Trigger".

== Death and legacy ==
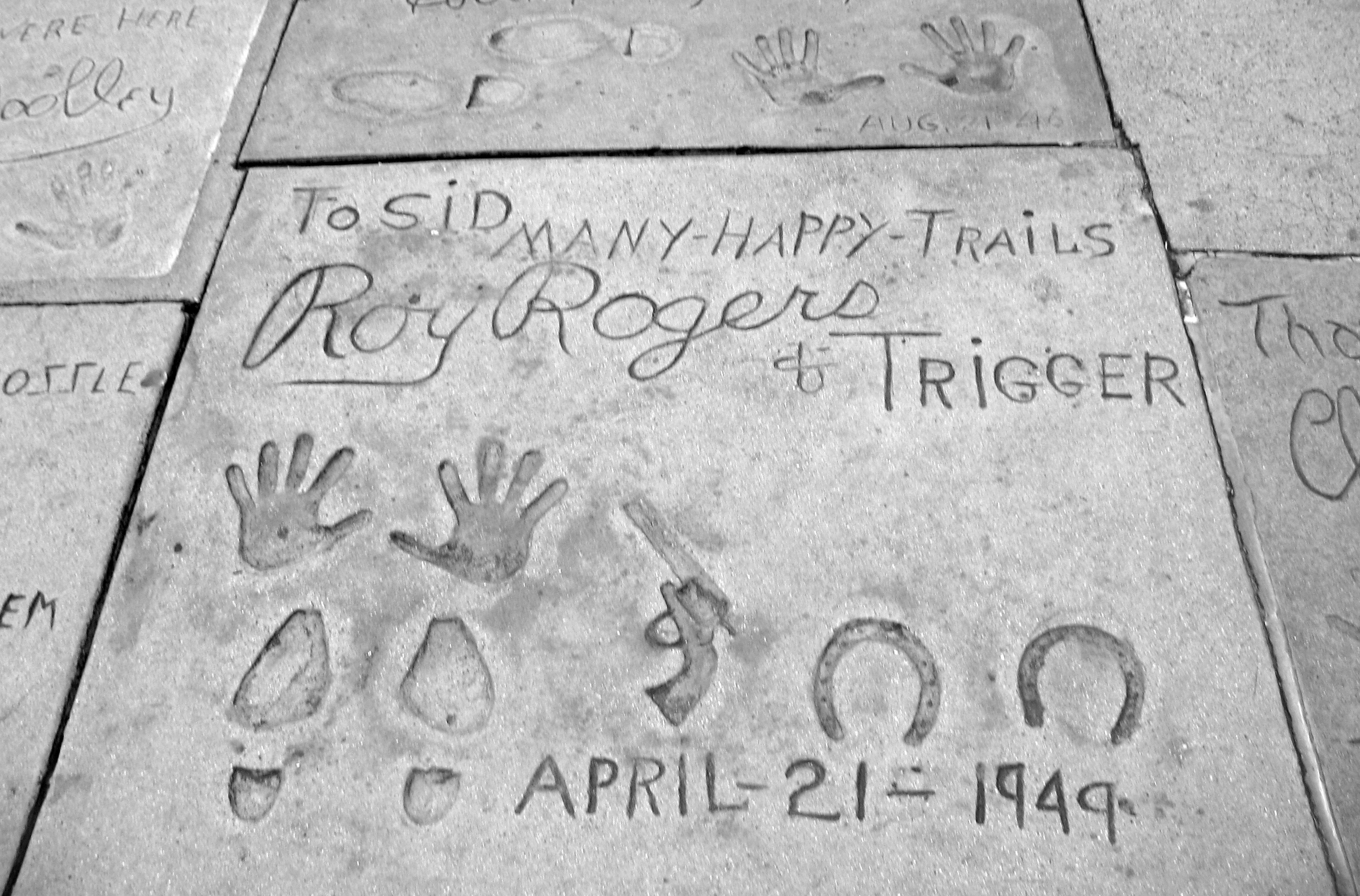
Roy Rogers and Trigger prints on the sidewalk in front of Grauman's Chinese Theatre in Hollywood

After the original Trigger died in 1965 at Rogers' new ranch in Apple Valley, California, Rogers arranged for Everett Wilkens of Bischoff's Taxidermy in Los Angeles (now Bischoff's Taxidermy and Animal FX in Burbank, California) to preserve and mount the horse. The hide was professionally stretched over a foam likeness of Trigger, and the resulting mount was put on display in the Roy Rogers-Dale Evans Museum when it opened in Apple Valley in 1967. The mount was later moved with the museum to Victorville, California, in 1976, and then to Branson, Missouri in 2003.

A 24-ft (7 m) replica of a rearing Trigger was produced to sit atop the Roy Rogers Museum in Victorville. The 1,300-lb (600 kg) replica could be seen from the freeway and served as a landmark until the museum closed and moved to Branson. When the fiberglass replica of Trigger was being made, Rogers was approached by the owners of the Denver Broncos. He allowed another statue to be made for them, then broke the mold. "Bucky the Bronco", Trigger's twin, stands above the south scoreboard of Empower Field at Mile High (formerly Broncos Stadium).

After the museum's closing in 2010, its contents were placed at public auction on July 14–15, 2010 at Christie's auction house in New York City. Trigger's preserved remains sold for $266,500 to television channel RFD-TV, which plans to start a Western museum. Bob Tinsley, a Victorville developer who built Roy Rogers' home in nearby Apple Valley, bought the fiberglass replica in April 2010, and plans to make the statue a part of historic Apple Valley Village. "I just couldn't see letting him go anywhere else," he explained. As of 2018, Chet Hitt and Bob Tinsley, installed Trigger's statue at the entrance of the Spirit River Center located on Apple Valley Road.

In 2009, a statue of Rogers and a rearing Trigger was erected in Historic Downtown Buford, Georgia. Buford was once a prominent leather tanning town, and in the 1940s, Rogers had a custom saddle made for Trigger at the Bona Allen Company.

== Selected filmography ==
- The Adventures of Robin Hood (1938)
- Man from Cheyenne (1942)
- San Fernando Valley (1944)
- Lake Placid Serenade (1944)
- Don't Fence Me In (1945)
- Along the Navajo Trail (1945)
- My Pal Trigger (1946)
- Roll on Texas Moon (1946)
- Under Nevada Skies (1946)
- The Gay Ranchero (1948)
- Under California Stars (1948)
- Melody Time (1948)
- The Golden Stallion (1949)
- Son of Paleface (1952)

== See also ==
- Buttermilk (horse)
- Wonder Horses
- List of historical horses

== Bibliography ==
- Pando, Leo (2007). An Illustrated History of Trigger, The Lives and Legend of Roy Rogers' Palomino. McFarland Publishing. ISBN 978-0-7864-6111-0.

Trigger was ridden in Gene Bary as Bat Masterson in the TV series in late season 2 and early season 3.
