= Edward J. White =

American film producer

- Born: March 15, 1903; New York, New York, United States
- Died: September 24, 1973 (aged 70); Culver City, California, United States
- Occupation: Producer
- Years active: 1939–1959 (film & TV)

Edward J. White (March 15, 1903 – September 24, 1973) was an American film producer.

He was best known for Westerns, particularly ones starring Roy Rogers and Dale Evans. He also produced the TV series Stories of the Century, which won an Emmy Award for Best Western or Adventure Series in 1955.

He died in Culver City, California, on September 24, 1973.

== Selected filmography ==
- Outlaws of Pine Ridge (1942)
- Days of Old Cheyenne (1943)
- Black Hills Express (1943)
- San Fernando Valley (1944)
- Along the Navajo Trail (1945)
- Eyes of Texas (1948)
- The Golden Stallion (1949)
- The Far Frontier (1949)
- Belle of Old Mexico (1950)
- North of the Great Divide (1950)
- Bells of Coronado (1950)
- Colorado Sundown (1952)

== Bibliography ==
- Len D. Martin. The Republic Pictures Checklist: Features, Serials, Cartoons, Short Subjects and Training Films of Republic Pictures Corporation, 1935-1959. McFarland, 1998.
