= List of Disney novelizations =

In 1930, Bibo and Lang of New York published the first Disney-licensed publication, Mickey Mouse Book, which featured the story of how he met Walt Disney and got his name. Though it sold very well in book stores, the book was also distributed to movie theaters that hosted Mickey Mouse fan clubs as a gift for the members.

The Book was soon followed a year later by a second book, the first one printed in hardback The Adventures of Mickey Mouse Book I, published by the David McKay Company, an illustrated storybook that presented stories with Mickey, Minnie and a variety of obscure characters from the original cartoon assemble (among them, Horace Horsecollar and Clarabelle Cow) and mentioned and featured a character bearing the name "Donald Duck", just three years before the official Donald first appeared in the Silly Symphony cartoon The Wise Little Hen (1934).

The novelization of Lady and the Tramp written by Ward Greene was incidentally published in 1953, two years before the film's release.

Since then, the Disney characters, films and television programs had have been adapted and subjected to various book formats; novels, storybooks, picture books, board books, booklets and even read-along book and records, tapes and CDs.

The following is a list of books based on Walt Disney Company media, from the classic cartoons and characters such as Mickey Mouse and Donald Duck, the Disney anthology television series, Disney Channel Original Movies, spin-offs from the DCOMs such as the High School Musical film series, Stories from East High or Camp Rock: Second Session, Disney Channel Original Series, and films from Walt Disney Pictures and its respective franchises (Winnie the Pooh, Herbie, Tron, The Mighty Ducks, Pirates of the Caribbean, etc.).

== Disney Channel Original Movies ==
=== Camp Rock ===
==== Movie novelizations ====
#	Novel	Author(s)	Release date
#1	Camp Rock	Lucy Ruggles	May 13, 2008
#2	Camp Rock 2: The Final Jam	Wendy Loggia	July 13, 2010

==== Second Session novelizations ====
#	Novel	Author(s)	Release date
#1	Play It Again	Phoebe Appleton	September 23, 2008
#2	For the Record	Lucy Ruggles	September 23, 2008
#3	Going Platinum	Helen Perelman	November 4, 2008
#4	Hidden Tracks	Helen Perelman	January 13, 2009
#5	Rock Royalty	Kathryn Williams	March 17, 2009
#6	Sound Off!	James Ponti	May 12, 2009
#7	Stage Fright	N. B. Grace	July 14, 2009
#8	The Right Chord	James Ponti	October 13, 2009

==== Specials ====
#	Novel	Author(s)	Release date
#1	Under the Mistletoe	N/A	September 15, 2009

=== Descendants ===
==== Movie novelizations ====
#	Novel	Author(s)	Release date
#1	Descendants	Eric Geron, Rico Green	July 14, 2015
#2	Descendants 2	Eric Geron	June 20, 2017
#3	Descendants 3	Carin Davis	July 30, 2019
#4	Descendants: The Rise of Red	Kelsey Rodkey	July 16, 2024

==== Isle of the Lost novelizations ====
#	Novel	Author(s)	Release date
#1	The Isle of the Lost	Melissa de la Cruz	May 5, 2015
#2	Return to the Isle of the Lost	Melissa de la Cruz	May 24, 2016
#3	Rise of the Isle of the Lost	Melissa de la Cruz	May 23, 2017
#4	Escape from the Isle of the Lost	Melissa de la Cruz	June 4, 2019
#5	Beyond the Isle of the Lost	Melissa de la Cruz	May 7, 2024

==== School of Secrets novelizations ====
#	Novel	Author(s)	Release date
#1	CJ's Treasure Chase	Jessica Brody	August 30, 2016
#2	Freddie's Shadow Cards	Jessica Brody	November 1, 2016
#3	Ally's Mad Mystery	Jessica Brody	February 28, 2017
#4	Lonnie's Warrior Sword	Jessica Brody	August 15, 2017
#5	Carlos's Scavenger Hunt	Jessica Brody	November 14, 2017

=== High School Musical ===
==== Movie novelizations ====
#	Novel	Author(s)	Release date
#1	High School Musical	N. B. Grace	June 6, 2006
#2	High School Musical 2	N. B. Grace	August 7, 2007
#3	High School Musical 3: Senior Year	N. B. Grace	September 23, 2008

==== Stories From East High novelizations ====
#	Novel	Author(s)	Release date
#1	Battle of the Bands	N. B. Grace	January 16, 2007
#2	Wildcat Spirit	Catherine Hapka	March 20, 2007
#3	Poetry in Motion	Alice Alfonsi	May 22, 2007
#4	Crunch Time	N. B. Grace	July 31, 2007
#5	Broadway Dreams	N. B. Grace	September 25, 2007
#6	Heart to Heart	Helen Perelman	November 27, 2007
#7	Friends Forever?	Catherine Hapka	February 26, 2008
#8	Get Your Vote On!	N. B. Grace	April 22, 2008
#9	Ringin' It In	N. B. Grace	August 26, 2008
#10	Turn up the Heat	Helen Perelman	October 28, 2008
#11	In the Spotlight	Catherine Hapka	December 23, 2008
#12	Bonjour, Wildcats	N. B. Grace	February 24, 2009
#13	Game On!	N/A	April 28, 2009
#14	Lights, Camera, Action!	N. B. Grace	July 21, 2009

==== Specials ====
#	Novel	Author(s)	Release date
#1	Under the Stars	Helen Perelman	June 3, 2008
#2	Shining Moments	Helen Perelman	April 28, 2009

=== Princess Protection Program ===
==== Movie novelizations ====
#	Novel	Author(s)	Release date
#1	Princess Protection Program	Wendy Loggia	May 12, 2009

==== Princess Protection Program series ====
#	Novel	Author(s)	Release date
#1	Chasing The Crown	Wendy Loggia	September 15, 2009
#2	Royalty Undercover	Wendy Loggia	September 15, 2009
#3	Top Secret Tiaras	N/A	December 8, 2009
#4	The Palace Of Mystery	N/A	March 9, 2010

=== Zombies ===
==== Movie novelizations ====
#	Novel	Author(s)	Release date
#1	Zombies	Judy Katschke	July 3, 2018

== Disney Channel Original Series ==
The following is a list of series of books based on the Disney Channel Original Series such as Hannah Montana and Wizards of Waverly Place.

=== Cory in the House ===
==== Series novelizations ====
#	Novel	Author	Release date	Episode(s) featured
#1	New Kid in Town	Alice Alfonsi	August 7, 2007	"The New Kid In Town" & "Ain't Miss Bahavian"
#2	Top Secret	Alice Alfonsi	December 18, 2007	"Beat The Press" & "Napper's Delight"
#3	Rock On!	Laurie McElroy	Unreleased	"Bahavian Idol"
#4	Election Fever	Laurie McElroy	Unreleased	

=== Gabby Duran & the Unsittables ===
==== Series novelizations ====
#	Novel	Author	Release date	Episode(s) featured
#1	Alien Babysitting Adventures	Carin Davis	May 19, 2020	"So Your Gor-Monite Child is Going to Explode"

=== Hannah Montana ===
==== Movie novelizations ====
#	Novel	Author	Release date
#!	Hannah Montana: The Movie	N. B. Grace	March 10, 2009

==== Series novelizations ====
#	Novel	Author	Release date	Episode(s) featured
#1	Keeping Secrets	Beth Beechwood	August 8, 2006	"Miley Get Your Gum" & "It's My Party And I'll Lie If I Want To"
#2	Face-Off	Alice Alfonsi	August 8, 2006	"You're So Vain, You Probably Think This Zit Is About You" & "Ooh, Ooh, Itchy Woman"
#3	Super Sneak	Laurie McElroy	November 21, 2006	"She's A Super Sneak" & "I Can't Make You Love Hannah If You Don't"
#4	Truth or Dare	M. C. King	January 16, 2007	"Oops! I Meddled Again" & "It's A Mannequin's World"
#5	Hold On Tight	Laurie McElroy	March 20, 2007	"O Say, Can You Remember The Words?" & "On The Road Again"
#6	Crush-Tastic!	Beth Beechwood	May 22, 2007	"Good Golly, Miss Dolly" & "Mascot Love"
#7	Nightmare on Hannah Street	Laurie McElroy	August 7, 2007	"Torn Between Two Hannahs" & "Grandmas, Don't Let Your Babies Grow Up To Play Favorites"
#8	Seeing Green	M. C. King	October 2, 2007	"More Than A Zombie To Me" & "People Who Use People"
#9	Face the Music	Beth Beechwood	November 27, 2007	"Smells Like Teen Sellout" & "We Are Family: Now Get Me Some Water!"
#10	Don't Bet on It	Ann Loyd	January 22, 2008	"Bad Moose Rising" & "My Boyfriend's Jackson And There's Gonna Be Trouble"
#11	Sweet Revenge	M. C. King	March 25, 2008	"The Idol Side Of Me" & "Schooly Bully"
#12	Win or Lose	Heather Alexander	May 27, 2008	"Money For Nothing, Guilt For Free" & "Debt It Be"
#13	True Blue	Laurie McElroy	July 29, 2008	"Cuffs Will Keep Us Together" & "Me And Rico Down By The School Yard"
#14	On the Road	Kitty Richards	September 23, 2008	"Get Down And Study-Udy-Udy" & "I Want You To Want Me...To Go To Florida"
#15	Game of Hearts	M. C. King	November 25, 2008	"My Best Friend's Boyfriend" & "You Are So Sua-Able To Me"
#16	Wishful Thinking	Laurie McElroy	January 27, 2009	"When You Wish You Were The Star" & "Take This Job And Love It!"
#17	One of a Kind	Laurie McElroy	March 31, 2009	"I Am Hannah, Hear Me Croak" & "You Gotta Not Fight For Your Right To Party"
#18	Superstar Secrets	M. C. King	June 23, 2009	"Achy Jakey Heart Part One" & "Achy Jakey Heart Part Two"
#19	Reality Check	N. B. Grace	September 29, 2009	"Song Sung Bad" & "Sleepwalk This Way"
#20	Hit or Miss	Laurie McElroy	December 29, 2009	"Me And Mr. Jonas And Mr. Jonas And Mr. Jonas" & "Everybody Was Best Friend Fighting"

==== On Tour novelizations ====
#	Novel	Author	Release date
#1	Ciao, Rome!	Helen Perelman	June 30, 2009
#2	G'day Sydney	M. C. King	June 30, 2009
#3	Greetings from Brazil	M. C. King	October 27, 2009
#4	Live from London	N/A	January 19, 2010

==== Specials ====
#	Novel	Author	Release date
#1	Rock the Waves	Suzanne Harper	August 5, 2008
#2	In the Loop	Suzanne Harper	February 17, 2009
#3	Swept Up	Suzanne Harper	June 2, 2009

=== J.O.N.A.S. ===
==== Series novelizations ====
#	Novel	Author	Release date	Episode(s) featured
#1	Wild Hearts	Catherine Hapka	July 14, 2009	"Fashion Victim" & "Wrong Song"
#2	Keeping It Real	Lara Bergen	July 14, 2009	"Keeping It Real" & "Groovy Movies"
#3	Off the Charts	Marianne Schaberg	October 13, 2009	"Chasing The Dream" &
#4	Double Take	Catherine Hapka	December 15, 2009	"That Ding You Do" & "Beauty And The Beat"
#5	About Face	N/A	February 9, 2010	"Frantic Romantic" & "Cold Shoulder"
#6	Three's a Crowd	N/A	April 13, 2010	"The Three Musketeers" & "Forgetting Stella's Birthday"
#7	Music Meltdown	N/A	June 15, 2010	"Detention" & "Karaoke Surprise"
#8	Prep School Party	N/A	August 10, 2010	

=== Kim Possible ===
#	Novel	Author	Release date	Episode(s) featured
#1	Bueno Nacho	Kiki Thorpe	2003	S1.E6 ∙ Bueno Nacho
#2	The New Ron	Kiki Thorpe	2003	S1.E3 ∙ The New Ron
#3	Showdown at Camp Wannaweep	Kiki Thorpe	2003	S1.E2 ∙ Sink or Swim
#4	Downhill	Jasmine Jones	2003	S1.E5 ∙ Downhill
#5	Killigan's Island	Jim Pascoe	2004	S1.E7 ∙ Number One
#6	Monkey Business	Marc Cerasini	2004	S1.E13 ∙ Monkey Fist Strikes
#7	Attack of the Killer Bebes	Jim Pascoe	2004	S1.E9 ∙ Attack of the Killer Bebes
#8	Royal Pain	Jasmine Jones	2004	S1.E10 ∙ Royal Pain
#9	Tweeb Trouble	Scott Ciencin	2004	S1.E17 ∙ The Twin Factor
#10	Extreme	Marc Cerasini	2004	S1.E15 ∙ All the News
#11	Grudge Match	Marc Cerasini	2005	S1.E12 ∙ Pain King vs. Cleopatra
#12	Cloned	Jacqueline Ching	2005	S1.E16 ∙ Kimitation Nation

#	Kim Possible: Pick a Villain	Author	Release date	Villains Featured
#1	Game On!	Scott Ciencin	2005	Duff Killigan, DNAmy, Shego, Dr. Drakken
#2	Badical Battles	Jim Pascoe	2005	Monkey Fist, Señor Senior Jr., Gemini, The Killer Bebes
#3	Masters of Mayhem	Scott Ciencin	2005	Jackie the Jackal, Motor Ed, Gill, Professor Dementor
#4	So Not The Drama!	Acton Figueroa	2005	Falsetto Jones, Frugal Lucre, Aviarius, White Stripe

=== Lizzie McGuire ===
List of Lizzie McGuire books

=== Phil of the Future ===
==== Series novelizations ====
#	Novel	Author	Release date	Episode(s) featured
#1	Stuck in Time	Jasmine Jones	August 22, 2005	"Future Tutor" & "Future Jock"
#2	The Great Fake-Out	Alice Alfonsi	November 28, 2005	"You Say Toe-Mato" & "Corner Pocket"
#3	Blast from the Past	N. B. Grace	February 28, 2006	"Meet The Curtis" & "Pheremonally Yours"
#4	Far-Out Phil	N. B. Grace	May 30, 2006	"Unification Day" & "We'll Fix It In Editing"
#5	Mad Science		Unreleased	

=== Phineas and Ferb ===
==== Series novelizations ====
#	Novel	Author	Release date	Episode(s) featured
#1	Speed Demons	Jasmine Jones	January 6, 2009	"The Fast and the Phineas" & "Rollercoaster"
#2	Runaway Hit	Lara Bergen	January 6, 2009	"Flop Starz" & "Lights, Candace, Action!"
#3	Wild Surprise	Helena Mayer	April 7, 2009	"Candace Loses Her Head" & "Mom's Birthday"
#4	Thrill-O-Rama!	Kitty Richards	July 7, 2009	"One Scare Ought to Do It" & "Are You My Mummy?"
#5	Big-Top Bonanza	N. B. Grace	October 6, 2009	"Jerk De Soleil"
#6	Daredevil Days	Molly McGuire	February 16, 2010	"Crack That Whip!" & "The Flying Fishmonger"
#7	Freeze Frame	N/A	May 18, 2010	"Traffic Cam-Caper" & "Bowl-R-Ama Drama"

==== Graphic novels ====
#	Novel	Author	Release date	Episode(s) featured
#1	Nothing But Trouble	John Green	June 15, 2010	"Day of the Living Gelatin" & "Elementary, My Dear Stacy"
#2	The Chronicles of Meap	John Green	June 15, 2010	"The Chronicles of Meap"

=== Sonny with a Chance ===
==== Series novelizations ====
#	Novel	Author	Release date	Episode(s) featured
#1	Welcome to Hollywood!	Ellie O'Ryan	January 5, 2010	"Sketchy Beginnings" & "West Coast Story"
#2	Making the Cut	N. B. Grace	January 5, 2010	"Promises, Prom-misses" & "You've Got Fan Mail"
#3	Star Power	Lara Bergen	May 4, 2010	"Fast Friends" & "Cheater Girls"

=== So Weird ===
==== Series novelizations ====
#	Novel	Author	Release date
#1	Family Reunion	Cathy Dubowski	April 1, 2000
#2	Shelter	Paul Mantell	April 1, 2000
#3	Escape	Elizabeth M. Rees	June 5, 2000
#4	Strangeling	Cathy Dubowski	July 17, 2000
#5	Web Sight	Pam Pollack & Meg Belviso	September 4, 2000

=== The Suite Life of Zack & Cody ===
==== Series novelizations ====
#	Novel	Author	Release date	Episode(s) featured
#1	Hotel Hangout	Kitty Richards	April 18, 2006	"Hotel Hangout"
#2	Double Trouble	N. B. Grace	April 18, 2006	"Maddie Checks In"
#3	Room Of Doom	M. C. King	July 18, 2006	"The Ghost Of Suite 613"
#4	Zack Attack	M. C. King	October 17, 2006	"Footloser"
#5	Check It Out	Beth Beechwood	January 16, 2007	"Hotel Inspector"
#6	Star Crazy	Laurie McElroy	2007	"Rock Star In The House"
#7	Side by Side	Beth Beechwood	2008	"Who's The Boss?"

=== Wizards of Waverly Place ===
==== Movie novelizations ====
#	Novel	Author	Release date
#1	Wizards of Waverly Place: The Movie	Alice Alfonsi	July 28, 2009

==== Series novelizations ====
#	Novel	Author	Release date	Episode(s) featured
#1	It's All Relative!	Sarah Nathan	July 22, 2008	"You Can't Always Get What You Carpet" & "Crazy Ten Minute Sale"
#2	Haywire	Beth Beechwood	July 22, 2008	"I Almost Drowned In A Chocolate Fountain" & "Curb Your Dragon"
#3	In Your Face	Heather Alexander	September 2, 2008	"Pop Me And We Both Go Down" & "First Kiss"
#4	Spellbound	Beth Beechwood	December 2, 2008	"Alex's Choice" & "New Employee"
#5	Top of the Class	Heather Alexander	March 3, 2009	"Wizard School Part One" & "Wizard School Part Two"
#6	All Mixed Up	Heather Alexander	July 28, 2009	"Alex's Spring Fling" & "The Supernatural"
#7	Oh, Brother!	Helen Perelman	September 29, 2009	"Justin's Little Sister" & "Alex In The Middle"
#8	Super Switch!	Heather Alexander	December 29, 2009	"Report Card & Disenchanted Evening"
#9	Rev It Up	N. B. Grace	February 23, 2010	"Racing & Taxi Dance"
#10	School's Out	N/A	August 17, 2010	"Saving WizTech Part One" & "Saving WizTech Part Two"

==== Other novelizations ====
#	Novel	Author	Release date	Episode(s) featured
#1	Once upon a Vampire	Ellie O'Ryan	August 25, 2009	"Justin & Juliet"; "Healthy Eating"; "Wake Up, Break Up, Shake Up" & "No Fear"

== Disney Read-Along ==
#	Title	Narrator	Publisher	Release date	Notes
314	The Seven Dwarfs and Their Diamond Mine		Disneyland Records	1968	
338	More Jungle Book ...further adventures of Baloo and Mowgli		Disneyland Records	1969	
339	The Haunted Mansion		Disneyland Records	1970	
343	Thumper's Race		Disneyland Records	1970	
363	Brer Rabbit and the Tar Baby		Disneyland Records	1971	
367; 14 DC	The Rescuers	Bob Holt	Disneyland Records	1977	
368	The Hobbit	Bob Holt	Disneyland Records	1977	
369	Pete's Dragon	Bob Holt	Disneyland Records	1977	
381; 25 DC	The Black Hole	Percy Rodriguez	Disneyland Records	1979	
382; 26 DC	The Return of the King; A Story of the Hobbits	John Huston as Gandalf	Disneyland Records	1980	
383; 27 DC	The Fox and the Hound	Chuck Riley	Disneyland Records	1981	
384; 34 DC	Tron	Chuck Riley	Disneyland Records	1982	
385; 36 DC	Return to Oz	William Woodson	Disneyland Records	1985	
386; 35 DC	Mickey's Christmas Carol	William Woodson	Disneyland Records	1983	
387; 37 DC	Disney Discovery Series Presents: Counting Fun; Numbers 1-12		Disneyland Records	1984	
388; 38 DC	Disney Discovery Series Presents: Baby Animals		Disneyland Records	1984	
389; 39 DC	The Black Cauldron	Chuck Riley	Disneyland Records	1985	
390; 40 DC	Disney Discovery Series Presents: Manners			1985	
391; 41 DC	Disney Discovery Series Presents: ABC	William Woodson	Disneyland Records	1985	
392; 42 DC	Disney Discovery Series Presents: Things That Go		Disneyland Records	1985	
393; 43 DC	Disney Discovery Series: People at Work		Disneyland Records	1985	
394; 44 DC	Wuzzles: Hoppopotamus Goes to Hollywuz	Stan Freberg	Disneyland Records	1985	
395; 45 DC	Wuzzles: Bumblelion's Funny Money	Stan Freberg	Disneyland Records	1985	
396; 46 DC	Wuzzles: Butterbear's Surprise Guest	Stan Freberg	Disneyland Records	1985	
397; 47 DC	Wuzzles: Elroo and the Brahma Bullfinch	Stan Freberg	Disneyland Records	1985	
450; 150 DC	Star Wars	Chuck Riley	Buena Vista Records	1979	Licensed from Lucasfilm; published 33 years before the Disney acquisition of the company in 2012.
451; 151 DC	The Empire Strikes Back	Chuck Riley	Buena Vista Records	1980	Licensed from Lucasfilm; published 32 years before the Disney acquisition of the company in 2012.
452; 152 DC	Raiders of the Lost Ark	William Woodson	Buena Vista Records	1981	Licensed from Lucasfilm; published 31 years before the Disney acquisition of the company in 2012.
453; 153 DC	Star Wars - The Further Adventures: Droid World	Chuck Riley	Buena Vista Records	1983	Licensed from Lucasfilm; published 29 years before the Disney acquisition of the company in 2012.
454; 154 DC	Star Wars - The Further Adventures: Planet of the Hoojibs	Chuck Riley	Buena Vista Records	1983	Licensed from Lucasfilm; published 29 years before the Disney acquisition of the company in 2012.
455; 155 DC	Return of the Jedi	Chuck Riley	Buena Vista Records	1983	Licensed from Lucasfilm; published 29 years before the Disney acquisition of the company in 2012.
456; 156 DC	E.T. The Extra-Terrestrial	Drew Barrymore as Gertie	Buena Vista Records	1983	Licensed from Universal Studios.
457; 157 DC	The Dark Crystal	William Woodson	Buena Vista Records	1983	Licensed from Henson Associates.
458; 158 DC	The Black Stallion	William Woodson	Buena Vista Records	1983	Licensed from United Artists.
459; 159 DC	The Black Stallion Returns	William Woodson	Buena Vista Records	1983	Licensed from United Artists.
460; 160 DC	Return of the Jedi: The Ewoks Join the Fight	Chuck Riley	Buena Vista Records	1983	Licensed from Lucasfilm; published 29 years before the Disney acquisition of the company in 2012.
461; 161 DC	Star Trek: The Motion Picture	Chuck Riley	Buena Vista Records	1983	Licensed from Paramount Pictures.
462; 162 DC	Star Trek II: The Wrath of Khan	Chuck Riley	Buena Vista Records	1983	Licensed from Paramount Pictures.
463; 163 DC	Star Trek III: The Search for Spock	Chuck Riley	Buena Vista Records	1984	Licensed from Paramount Pictures.
464; 164 DC	The Last Starfighter	Chuck Riley	Buena Vista Records	1984	Licensed from Lorimar.
465; 165 DC	Indiana Jones and the Temple of Doom	Chuck Riley	Buena Vista Records	1984	Licensed from Lucasfilm; published 38 years before the Disney acquisition of the company in 2012.
466; 166 DC	Gremlins	Chuck Riley	Buena Vista Records	1984	Licensed from Warner Bros. Pictures.
467; 167 DC	The Ewok Adventure	William Woodson	Buena Vista Records	1984	Licensed from Lucasfilm; published 28 years before the Disney acquisition of the company in 2012.
468; 168 DC	Robo Force: The Battle at the Fortress of Steele	Chuck Riley	Buena Vista Records	1985	Licensed from the Ideal Toy Company.
469; 169 DC	The Goonies	Jeff Cohen as Chunk	Buena Vista Records	1985	Licensed from Warner Bros. Pictures.
470; 170 DC	Ewoks: The Battle for Endor	William Woodson	Buena Vista Records	1985	Licensed from Lucasfilm; published 27 years before the Disney acquisition of the company in 2012.
471; 171 DC	Star Trek IV: The Voyage Home	Chuck Riley	Buena Vista Records	1986	Licensed from Paramount Pictures.
480; 180 DC	Star Wars: Adventures in Colors and Shapes	William Woodson	Buena Vista Records	1984	Licensed from Lucasfilm; published 28 years before the Disney acquisition of the company in 2012.
481; 181 DC	Star Wars: Adventures in ABC	William Woodson and Anthony Daniels as C-3PO	Buena Vista Records	1984	Licensed from Lucasfilm; published 28 years before the Disney acquisition of the company in 2012.
482; 182 DC	Labyrinth	William Woodson	Buena Vista Records	1986	Licensed from Henson Associates.
483; 183 DC	Willow	Roy Dotrice	Buena Vista Records	1988	Licensed from Lucasfilm; published 24 years before the Disney acquisition of the company in 2012.
484; 184 DC	Indiana Jones and the Last Crusade	John Rhys-Davies	Buena Vista Records	1989	Licensed from Lucasfilm; published 23 years before the Disney acquisition of the company in 2012.
256 DC	The Small One		Disneyland Records	1987	
257 DC	Jingle Bells		Disneyland Records	1987	
501; 501B	Gummi Bears: Gummies to the Rescue!	William Woodson	Disneyland Records	1985	
502; 502B	Gummi Bears: Zummi's Magic Spell	William Woodson	Disneyland Records	1985	
503; 503B	The Great Mouse Detective	Laurie Main	Disneyland Records	1986	
504; 504B	Gummi Bears: Cubbi Finds a Friend	William Woodson	Disneyland Records	1985	
505; 505B	Gummi Bears: Tummi and the Dragon	William Woodson	Disneyland Records	1985	
507; 507B	Disney Discovery Series Presents: Safety First		Disneyland Records	1986	
508; 508B	Disney Discovery Series Presents: Colors and Shapes		Disneyland Records	1986	
509; 509B	Fluppy Dogs: The Happiest Fluppy		Disneyland Records	1986	
510; 510B	Fluppy Dogs: Lost and Found Fluppy		Disneyland Records	1986	
511; 511B	Disney Discovery Series Presents: The Seasons		Disneyland Records	1986	
512; 512B	Disney Discovery Series Presents: Telling Time		Disneyland Records	1986	
513B	The Aristocats	Linda Gary	Disneyland Records	1987	New edition.
514B	DuckTales: Welcome to Duckburg	William Schallert	Disneyland Records	1987	
515B	DuckTales: Launchpad's Daring Raid	William Schallert	Disneyland Records	1987	
516B	DuckTales: Dinosaur Ducks	William Schallert	Disneyland Records	1987	
517B	DuckTales: Scrooge's Treasure Hunt	William Schallert	Disneyland Records	1987	
518B	Ernest Goes to Camp	Jim Varney as Ernest P. Worrell	Buena Vista Records	1987	
519B	Mickey Mouse: Donald's Pooch Parlor		Disneyland Records	1987	
520B	Mickey Mouse: Mickey's Tattered Tale		Disneyland Records	1987	
521B	Who Framed Roger Rabbit	Charles Fleischer as Roger Rabbit	Buena Vista Records	1988	
522B	Oliver & Company	William Woodson	Disneyland Records	1988	
523B	Winnie the Pooh and the Honey Tree		Disneyland Records	1988	New edition.
524B	Winnie the Pooh and the Blustery Day		Disneyland Records	1988	New edition.
525B	Winnie the Pooh and Tigger Too		Disneyland Records	1988	New edition.
526B	Winnie the Pooh and a Day for Eeyore		Disneyland Records	1988	
527B	Honey, I Shrunk the Kids	Robert Oliveri as Nick Szalinski	Disneyland Records	1989	
528B	Chip 'n Dale: Rescue Rangers: The Case of the Missing Egg	William Woodson	Disneyland Records	1989	
529B	Chip 'n Dale: Rescue Rangers: The Case of the Flying Carpet	William Woodson	Disneyland Records	1989	
530B	The Little Mermaid	Roy Dotrice	Walt Disney Records	1990	

Title	Narrator	Publisher	ISBN	Release date	Notes
Chip 'n Dale: Rescue Rangers: Rootin' Tootin' Rangers	William Woodson	Walt Disney Records		1991	
TaleSpin: Drumming Up Business	William Woodson	Walt Disney Records		1991	
TaleSpin: The Seeds of Victory	William Woodson	Walt Disney Records		1991	
Darkwing Duck: High Wave Robbery	William Woodson	Walt Disney Records		1991	
The Rocketeer	Chuck Riley	Walt Disney Records		1991	
Beauty and the Beast	Roy Dotrice	Walt Disney Records		1991	
The Little Mermaid: Ariel's Christmas Under the Sea	Roy Dotrice	Walt Disney Records		1991	
Aladdin	Jim Cummings as the Peddler	Walt Disney Records		1992	
Aladdin: Adventure in the Cave of Wonders	Jim Cummings as the Peddler	Walt Disney Records		1992	
101 Dalmatians: A Lucky Christmas	Michael Gough	Walt Disney Records		1993	
Beauty and the Beast: One Magical Christmas	Roy Dotrice	Walt Disney Records		1993	
Aladdin: Iago Returns	Corey Burton as the Peddler	Walt Disney Records		1994	
The Lion King	Robert Guillaume as Rafiki	Walt Disney Records		1994	
The Lion King: Far from the Pride Lands	Roy Dotrice	Walt Disney Records	978-1557236739	October 1994	
The Lion King: The Brightest Star	James Earl Jones as Mufasa	Walt Disney Records		1994	
Toy Story	Tracy Fraim	Walt Disney Records		1995	
Pocahontas	Roy Dotrice	Walt Disney Records		1995	
Pocahontas: Listen With Your Heart	David Ogden Stiers	Walt Disney Records		1995	
Pocahontas: The Spirit of Giving		Walt Disney Records		1995	
101 Dalmatians	Russi Taylor as Nanny	Walt Disney Records		1996	
The Hunchback of Notre Dame	David Ogden Stiers as the Archdeacon	Walt Disney Records		1996	
Hercules	Danny DeVito as Philoctetes	Walt Disney Records		1997	
The Original Story of Winnie the Pooh	Long John Baldry	Walt Disney Records		1997	
Mary Poppins	Karen Dotrice as Adult Jane Banks	Walt Disney Records		1997	
Mulan	Roy Dotrice	Walt Disney Records		1998	
Tarzan	Chuck Riley	Walt Disney Records		1999	
Dinosaur: Aladar's Adventure	Tim Curry	Walt Disney Records		2000	

== Disney Television Animation ==
=== Doug: The Funnie Mysteries ===
#	Novel	Author	Release date
#1	Invasion of the Judy Snatchers	Dennis Garvey	April 2000
#2	True Graffiti	Danny Campbell and Kimberly Campbell	April 2000
#3	The Case of the Baffling Beast	Justine Korman and Ron Fontes	May-2000
#4	The Curse of Beetenkaumun	Pam Pollack	August 2000
#5	Haunted House Hysteria	Dennis Garvey	October 2000
#6	Bad to the Bone	Danny Campbell and Kimberly Campbell	December 2000
#7	Jurassic Doug	Kim Ostrow	February 2001
#8	The Bluffington Blob	Ellen Weiss	March 2001

== Mickey Mouse universe ==
=== Storybooks ===
Title	Author	Publisher	ISBN	Release date	Notes
The Adventures of Mickey Mouse Book I	Staff of Walt Disney Studios	David McKay Company and Corporated	[none]	1931	
The Adventures of Mickey Mouse Book Number 2	Staff of Walt Disney Studios	David McKay Company and Corporated	[none]	1932	
Mickey Mouse in Giantland	Staff of Walt Disney Studios	David McKay Company and Corporated	[none]	1934	
Mickey Mouse and His Horse Tanglefoot	Staff of Walt Disney Studios	David McKay Company and Corporated	[none]	1936	
Mickey Mouse in Pigmy Land	Walt Disney	Whitman Publishing Company	[none]	1936	
Mickey Mouse, Crusoe	Walt Disney	Whitman Publishing Company	[none]	1936	
The Mickey Mouse Fire Brigade	Walt Disney	Whitman Publishing Company	[none]	1936	
Mickey Mouse Sky High	Walt Disney	Birn Brothers, Ltd.	[none]	1937	
Mickey Mouse Air Pilot	Walt Disney	Birn Brothers, Ltd.	[none]	1937	

==== Wee Little Books ====
Title	Author	Publisher	ISBN	Release date	Notes
Mickey Mouse and Tanglefoot	Walt Disney	Whitman Publishing Company	[none]	1934	
Mickey Mouse's Uphill Fight	Walt Disney	Whitman Publishing Company	[none]	1934	
Mickey Mouse Wins the Race!	Walt Disney	Whitman Publishing Company	[none]	1934	
Mickey Mouse's Misfortune	Walt Disney	Whitman Publishing Company	[none]	1934	
Mickey Mouse Will Not Quit!	Walt Disney	Whitman Publishing Company	[none]	1934	
Mickey Mouse at the Carnival	Walt Disney	Whitman Publishing Company	[none]	1934	

==== Mickey Mouse Adventures ====
Title	Author	Publisher	ISBN	Release date	Notes
Mickey Mouse in: Sky Island	Nikki Grimes	Mallard Press	0792454014	1990	
Mickey Mouse in: The Cactus Kid	Lee Nordling	Mallard Press	0792454065	1990	
Mickey Mouse in: The Barracuda Triangle	Floyd Norman	Mallard Press	0792454022	1990	
Mickey Mouse in: The Phantom Blot	Lee Nordling	Mallard Press	0792454030	1990	
Mickey Mouse in: Bing Bong	Lee Nordling	Mallard Press	0792454057	September 1990	
Mickey Mouse in: The Viking's Eye	Nikki Grimes	Mallard Press	0792454049	November 1990	

== Walt Disney Pictures ==
This is a partial list of novelizations based on Disney theatrical feature films, both live-action and animated. As a continuity reference, most of the novels will carry the term on their respective front cover "The Book of the Film".

=== Film novelizations (in chronological order of theatrical release) ===
- Walt Disney Tells the Story of Pinocchio (1939), Walt Disney
- Treasure Island (1950)
- The Story of Robin Hood (1952), Edward Boyd
- Peter Pan (1953)
- Lady and the Tramp (1953), Ward Greene
- Rob Roy: The Highland Rogue (1954), Edward Boyd
- The Great Locomotive Chase (1956), MacLennan Roberts
- Darby O'Gill and the Little People (1959), Lawrence Edward Watkin
- Toby Tyler (1960), Dorothea J. Snow
- Kidnapped (1960), Cole Fannin
- The Swiss Family Robinson (1960), Steve Frazee
- The Absent-Minded Professor (1961), George R. Sherman
- Son of Flubber (1963), Roger Fuller
- The Sword in the Stone (1963), Mary Virginia Carey
- The Misadventures of Merlin Jones (1964), Mary Virginia Carey
- Mary Poppins (1964), Mary Virginia Carey
- Lt. Robin Crusoe, U.S.N. (1966), Bill Ford
- Monkeys, Go Home! (1967), Mel Cebulash
- The Gnome-Mobile (1967), Mary Virginia Carey
- The Jungle Book (1967), Mary Virginia Carey
- Charlie, the Lonesome Cougar (1968), Mark Van Cleefe
- The Happiest Millionaire (1968), A. J. Carothers
- Blackbeard's Ghost (1968), Mary Virginia Carey
- The Love Bug (1969), Mel Cebulash
- The Boatniks (1970), Mel Cebulash
- The Million Dollar Duck (1971), Vic Crume
- Bedknobs and Broomsticks (1971)
- The World's Greatest Athlete (1973), Gerald Gardner and Dee Caruso
- Herbie Rides Again (1974), Mel Cebulash
- The Strongest Man in the World (1975), Mel Cebulash
- Gus (1976), Vic Crume
- Escape from the Dark (1976), Rosemary Anne Sisson
- The Shaggy D. A. (1977), Vic Crume
- Herbie Goes to Monte Carlo (1977), Vic Crume
- Return from Witch Mountain (1978), Alexander Key
- The Black Hole (1979), Alan Dean Foster
- The Last Flight of Noah's Ark (1980), Chas Carner
- Dragonslayer (1981), Wayland Drew
- Condorman (1981), Joe Claro
- Tron (1982), Brian Daley
- Return to Oz (1985), Joan D. Vinge
- The Journey of Natty Gann (1985), Ann Matthews
- One Magic Christmas (1985), Martin Noble
- Return to Snowy River (1988), Tony Johnston
- Honey, I Shrunk the Kids (1989), Bonnie Bryant Hiller and Neil W. Hiller
- Shipwrecked (1991), Bonnie Bryant Hiller
- The Rocketeer (1991), Peter David
- Beauty and the Beast (1991) A. L. Singer
- Newsies (1992), Jonathan Fast
- Honey, I Blew Up the Kid (1992), Bonnie Bryant Hiller
- The Mighty Ducks (1992), Jordan Horowitz
- Aladdin (1992), A. L. Singer
- Hocus Pocus (1993), Todd Strasser
- D2: The Mighty Ducks (1994), Jordan Horowitz
- White Fang 2: Myth of the White Wolf (1994), Elizabeth Faucher
- The Lion King (1994), Gina Ingoglia
- Angels in the Outfield (1994), Jordan Horowitz
- Squanto: A Warrior's Tale (1994), Ron Fontes and Justine Korman
- The Santa Clause (1994), Daphne Skinner
- Rudyard Kipling's The Jungle Book (1994), Mel Gilden
- Heavyweights (1995), Jordan Horowitz
- Tall Tale (1995), Todd Strasser
- A Goofy Movie (1995), Francine Hughes
- Pocahontas (1995), Gina Ingoglia
- A Kid in King Arthur's Court (1995), Anne Mazer
- The Big Green (1995), J. J. Gardner
- Toy Story (1995), Cathy East Dubowski
- Homeward Bound II: Lost in San Francisco (1996), Nancy E. Krulik
- The Hunchback of Notre Dame (1996)
- D3: The Mighty Ducks (1996), Jonathan Schmidt
- Jungle 2 Jungle (1997), Nancy E. Krulik
- Hercules (1997), Cathy East Dubowski
- George of the Jungle (1997), Beth Nadler
- Flubber (1997), Cathy East Dubowski
- Mr. Magoo (1997), Nancy E. Krulik
- Mulan (1998), Cathy East Dubowski
- The Parent Trap (1998), Hallie Marshall
- A Bug's Life (1998), Justine Korman and Ron Fontes
- Mighty Joe Young (1998), Hallie Marshall
- My Favorite Martian (1999), Dona Smith
- Tarzan (1999), Kathleen Weidner Zoehfeld
- Inspector Gadget (1999), Scott Sorrentino
- Toy Story 2 (1999), Leslie Goldman
- The Tigger Movie: The Onliest Tigger (2000), Leslie Goldman
- 102 Dalmatians (2000), Nicola J. Holmes
- Treasure Planet (2002)
- Brother Bear (2003)
- Chicken Little (2005)
- The Shaggy Dog (2006)
- Meet the Robinsons (2007)
- Bolt (2008)
- Toy Story 3 (2010)
- Tangled (2010)
- Prom (2011), Ellie O'Ryan
- Frozen (2013)
- Toy Story 4 (2019)

=== 1960s ===
Title	Author	Publisher	ISBN	Release date	Notes
The Shaggy Dog	Elizabeth L. Griffen	Scholastic		1967	
The Parent Trap	Vic Crume			1968	

=== 1970s ===
Title	Author	Publisher	ISBN	Release date	Notes
Robin Hood	Derry Moffatt	New English Library		April 1974 (original); October 1975 (reprint)	
Snow White and the Seven Dwarfs	Guy N. Smith	New English Library		September 1975	
Lady and the Tramp	Derry Moffatt	New English Library		September 1975	
Song of the South	Guy N. Smith	New English Library		September 1975	
Dumbo	Derry Moffatt	New English Library		September 1975	
Pinocchio	Derry Moffatt	New English Library		September 1975	
Sleeping Beauty	Guy N. Smith	New English Library		September 1975	
The Three Caballeros	Jimmy Corinis	New English Library		February 1976	
The Sword in the Stone	Derry Moffatt	New English Library		January 1976	
The Aristocats	Derry Moffatt	New English Library		June 1976 (original); 1979 (reprint)	
One of Our Dinosaurs Is Missing	John Harvey	New English Library		March 1976	
The Strongest Man in the World	Ann Spanoghe	New English Library		March 1976	
The Swiss Family Robinson	Jimmy Corinis	New English Library		March 1976	
The Legend of Sleepy Hollow	Guy N. Smith	New English Library		April 1976	
Darby O'Gill and the Little People	Ann Spano	New English Library		August 1976	
Cinderella	Derry Moffatt	New English Library		October 1976	
Winnie-the-Pooh and Tigger Too and Other Stories	Janet Sacks	New English Library		November 1976 (original); 1979 (reprint)	
Superdad	Ann Spanoghe	New English Library		November 1976	
Peter Pan	Barbara Shook Hazen	New English Library		1976	
Herbie Rides Again	John Harvey	New English Library		January 1977	
Treasure of Matecumbe	Derry Moffatt	New English Library		April 1977	
Alice in Wonderland	Ann Spano	New English Library		February 1977	
Bedknobs and Broomsticks	Dorothy Houghton	New English Library		June 1977	
Treasure Island	Derry Moffatt	New English Library		March 1977	
The Shaggy D. A.	Vic Crume	New English Library		November 1977	
In Search of the Castaways	Hettie Jones	Pocket Books		February 1978	
Herbie Goes to Monte Carlo	John Harvey	New English Library		April 1978	
Pete's Dragon	Dewy Moffatt	New English Library		October 1978	
20,000 Leagues Under the Sea	Ann Spano	New English Library		November 1978	
Return from Witch Mountain	Martin Mellett	Piccolo Books		1979	
The Spaceman and King Arthur	Heather Simon	New English Library		August 1979	

=== 1980s ===
Title	Author	Publisher	ISBN	Release date	Notes
Midnight Madness	Tom Wright	Ace Books	0441529852	February 1, 1980	
Snowball Express	Joe Claro	Scholastic Book Services	0590303597	1980	
Herbie Goes Bananas	Joe Claro	Scholastic Book Services	0590316095	1980	
The Last Flight of Noah's Ark	Heather Simon	New English Library	0450050068	August 1980	
The Devil and Max Devlin	Robert Grossbach	Ballantine Books	0345293649	January 12, 1981	
Condorman	Heather Simon	New English Library	0450052605	July 1981	
The Fox and the Hound	Heather Simon	Pocket Books; New English Library	0671442910	December 1981	
The Jungle Book	Jean Bethell	Ottenheimer Publishers	0448161079	1984	
Pinocchio		Ottenheimer Publishers		1984	
One Hundred and One Dalmatians		Ottenheimer Publishers		1984	
Return to Oz	Alistair Hedley	Puffin Books	0140319576	1985	Young adult novelization; Published as part of the "Young Puffin" series.
Lady and the Tramp	Victoria Crenson	Ottenheimer Publishers	0816708864	1986	
The Aristocats	Victoria Crenson	Ottenheimer Publishers	0816708878	1986	
Song of the South	Victoria Crenson	Ottenheimer Publishers	0816708886	1986	
Who Framed Roger Rabbit	Justine Korman	Puffin Books	0140341889	1988	Young adult novelization
Honey, I Shrunk the Kids	Elizabeth Faucher	Fantail	0140902120	1989	

=== 1990s ===
Title	Author	Publisher	ISBN	Release date	Notes
The Rocketeer	Ron Fontes	Scholastic	0590453513	January 1991	Young adult novelization
One Hundred and One Dalmatians	Ann Braybrooks	Scholastic	0590449397	June 1991	
Robin Hood	A.L. Singer	Disney Press		1992	
Pinocchio	Gina Ingoglia	Disney Press		1992	
The Jungle Book	Jim Razzi	Disney Press	1562822438	1992	
Snow White and the Seven Dwarfs	Jim Razzi	Disney Press		1993	
Bambi	Joanne Ryder	Disney Press	1562824449	1993	
Peter Pan	Todd Strasser	Disney Press	1562826409	1994	
Lady and the Tramp	Todd Strasser	Disney Press	156282614-X	1994	
The Aristocats	Nigel Robinson	Hippo Books	0590556185	1994	
Alice in Wonderland	Teddy Slater	Disney Press		1995	
Cinderella	Zoe Lewis	Disney Press		1995	

=== Storybooks ===
Title	Author	Publisher	ISBN	Release date	Notes
Walt Disney's Giant Story Book		Purnell Books	361013841	1969	
The Giant Walt Disney Word Book		Purnell Books		1971	
Walt Disney's Giant Book of Bedtime Stories		Purnell Books	978-0361021128	October 1972	
Alice Favorites		The Danbury Press	0717281084	1973	
Peter Pan Favorites		The Danbury Press	0717281086	1973	
Dumbo Favorites		The Danbury Press	0717281108	1973	
Snow White Favorites		The Danbury Press	0717281116	1973	
Pinocchio Favorites		The Danbury Press	0717281124	1973	
Walt Disney's Giant Book of Fairy Tales		Purnell Books	978-0361021142	October 1973	
Walt Disney's Giant Book of Favorites		Purnell Books	361034962	1976	
Walt Disney's Story a Day for Every Day of the Year: Spring		Golden Press	0307230309	1978	
Walt Disney's Story a Day for Every Day of the Year: Summer		Golden Press	0307230317	1978	
Walt Disney's Story a Day for Every Day of the Year: Autumn		Golden Press	0307230325	1978	
Walt Disney's Story a Day for Every Day of the Year: Winter		Golden Press	0307230333	1978	
Walt Disney's Best Storybook Ever		Golden Press	0855588578	1979	
The Black Hole Storybook	Shep Steneman	Random House	0394842782 (trade); 0394942787 (lib. bdg.)	1979	
The Black Hole: Discovery of the Mystery Ship		Purnell Books	978-0361048644	March 1, 1980	
Popeye - The Storybook Based on the Movie	Stephanie Skinner	Random House	0394846680 (trade); 0394946685 (lib. bdg.)	1980	
Dragonslayer - The Storybook Based on the Movie	Larry Weinberg	Random House	0394848497 (trade); 0394948491 (lib. bdg.)	1981	
Tron - The Storybook	Lawrence Weinberg	Little Simon	0671445588	1982	
Walt Disney Favorites		Purnell Books; St Michael	0361065833	1984	
The Black Cauldron	Allison Sage	Hippo Books		1985	

==== Walt Disney's American Classics ====
Title	Author	Publisher	ISBN	Release date	Notes
The Legend of Sleepy Hollow		Mallard Press		1989	
Johnny Appleseed		Mallard Press		1989	
Paul Bunyan		Mallard Press		1989	
Davy Crockett		Mallard Press		1989	
Brer Rabbit in the Briar Patch		Mallard Press	0792450558	1989	
Casey at the Bat		Mallard Press		1990	
Little Hiawatha		Mallard Press		1990	
Old Yeller		Mallard Press		1990	
Pecos Bill		Mallard Press		1990	

=== Snow White and the Seven Dwarfs ===
==== Snow White and the Seven Dwarfs Little Library ====
#	Novel	Author	Release date
#1	Into the Forest		1993
#2	Seven New Friends		1993
#3	The Spell Is Cast		1993
#4	A Dream Come True		1993

=== Sleeping Beauty ===
==== Sleeping Beauty Little Library ====
#	Novel	Author	Release date
#1	The New Baby		1997
#2	In the Forest		1997
#3	The Pretend Prince		1997
#4	The Birthday Party		1997

=== Tron ===
Title	Author	Publisher	ISBN	Release date	Notes
Tron: The Junior Novel	Alice Alfonsi			2010	
Tron: Legacy - Derezzed	James Gelsey			2010	
Tron: Legacy - Out of the Dark	Tennant Redbank			2010	
Tron: Legacy - It's Your Call: Initiate Sequence	Carla Jablonski			2010	

=== Walt Disney Playmates ===
Title	Author	Publisher	ISBN	Release date	Notes
Dumbo's Holiday		Purnell Books			
Bambi Finds the End of the Rainbow		Purnell Books			
Winnie-the-Pooh and the Treasure Hunt		Purnell Books			
The Rescuers and the Mystery of the Missing Cats		Purnell Books	361045212	1979	
Sleeping Beauty		Purnell Books	036105341X	1982	
Snow White and the Seven Dwarfs		Purnell Books	036105341X	1982	
Copper and Tod Play Together		Purnell Books	036105341X	1982	
Copper and Tod Grow Up		Purnell Books	036105341X	1982	

=== Walt Disney's Classics ===
Title	Author	Publisher	ISBN	Release date	Notes
Snow White and the Seven Dwarfs	Suzanne Weyn	Scholastic	0590411705	July 1987	
Cinderella	Jan Carr	Scholastic	0590411713	October 1987	
Lady and the Tramp	Jan Carr	Scholastic	0590414500	December 1987	
The Fox and the Hound	James Preller	Scholastic	0590411721	May 1988	
Bambi	Jan Carr	Scholastic	0590416641	July 1988	
Oliver & Company	Jan Carr	Scholastic	0590420496	October 1988	
Peter Pan	Jan Carr	Scholastic	0590419137	July 1989	
The Little Mermaid	Jan Carr	Scholastic	0590429887	November 1989	
The Jungle Book	Jan Carr	Scholastic	0590435161	June 1990	
The Prince and the Pauper	Nancy E. Krulik	Scholastic	059044364X	November 1990	
The Rescuers Down Under	A. L. Singer	Scholastic	0590443658	November 1990	

=== The Little Mermaid ===
#	Novel	Author	Release date
#!	Green-Eyed Pearl		
#!	Nefazia Visits the Palace		
#!	Reflections of Arsula		
#!	The Same Old Song		
#!	Arista's New Boyfriend		
#!	Ariel the Spy		
#!	King Triton, Beware!		
#!	The Haunted Palace		
#!	The Boyfriend Mix-Up		
#!	The Practical Joke War		
#!	The Dolphins of Coral Cove		
#!	Alana's Secret Friend		

==== The Little Mermaid Little Library (Series 1) ====
#	Novel	Author	Release date
#1	Ariel's Tale		1989
#2	Ariel's Treasure		1989
#3	The World Above		1989
#4	One Clever Seagull		1989

==== The Little Mermaid Little Library (Series 2) ====
#	Novel	Author	Release date
#1	Ariel's Treasure		1997
#2	Sebastian's Problem		1997
#3	Eric's New Friend		1997
#4	Ursula's Plan		1997

==== The Little Mermaid's Treasure Chest ====
#	Novel	Author	Release date
#1	Another Fine Mess		
#2	Ariel's Painting Party		
#3	As Fun As You Feel		
#4	Bee Nice		
#5	The Big Switch		
#6	Castles in the Sand		
#7	A Charmed Life		
#8	Cheer Up, Sebastian		
#9	The Crabby Conductor		
#10	Dear Diary		
#11	Detective Sebastian		
#12	A Dragon's Tail		
#14	Flounder, My Hero		
#15	Flounder's Folly		
#16	The Good Sport		
#17	Her Majesty, Ariel		
#18	How Does Your Garden Grow?		
#19	The Magic Melody		
#20	Paradise Island		
#21	Scared Silly		
#22	Scuttle's Last Flight		
#23	A Slippery Deck		
#24	An Undersea Wish		
#25	Whistles and Doubloons		

=== The Prince and the Pauper ===
==== The Prince and the Pauper Little Library ====
#	Novel	Author	Release date
#1	Mickey Meets the Prince		1991
#2	A Royal Adventure		1991
#3	The Make-Believe Prince		1991
#4	Captain Pete's Defeat		1991

=== Beauty and the Beast ===
==== Beauty and the Beast Little Library ====
#	Novel	Author	Release date
#1	The Enchanted Castle		1991
#2	Belle in the Beast's Lair		1991
#3	A Change of Heart		1991
#4	Wishes Come True		1991

=== Aladdin ===
==== Aladdin: Six New Adventures ====
#	Novel	Author	Release date
#1	A-Mazing Aladdin	Alex Simmons	January 1, 1993
#2	Jasmine and the Disappearing Tiger	Leslie McGuire	January 1, 1993
#3	Abu and the Evil Genie	Michael Teitelbaum	January 1, 1993
#4	Aladdin's Quest	Emily James	January 1, 1993
#5	Don't Bug the Genie!	Page McBrier	January 1, 1993
#6	The Magic Secret	Joanne Barkan	January 1, 1993

==== The Further Adventures of Aladdin ====
#	Novel	Author	Release date
#1	A Thief in the Night	A. R. Plumb	September 1, 1994
#2	Birds of a Feather	A. R. Plumb	September 1, 1994
#3	A Small Problem	A. R. Plumb	March 1, 1995
#4	Iago's Promise	A. R. Plumb	March 1, 1995

==== Aladdin Little Library ====
#	Novel	Author	Release date
#1	An Unhappy Princess		1992
#2	The Cave of Wonders		1992
#3	The Genie of the Lamp		1992
#4	Aladdin to the Rescue		1992

=== The Lion King ===
==== The Lion King: Six New Adventures ====
#	Novel	Author	Release date
#1	A Tale of Two Brothers	Alex Simmons	1994
#2	Nala's Dare	Joanne Barkan	1994
#3	Vulture Shock	Judy Katschke	1994
#4	A Snake in the Grass	Leslie McGuire	1994
#5	Follow the Leader	Page McBrier	1994
#6	How True, Zazu?	Leslie McGuire	1994

=== Pocahontas ===
==== Pocahontas: Six New Adventures ====
#	Novel	Author	Release date
#1	Little Mischief	Leslie McGuire	1995
#2	A Boy Across the Sea	Joanne Barkan	1995
#3	The Hidden Village	Alex Simmons	1995
#4	On the High Seas	Paige McBrier	1995
#5	Keep an Eye on Meeko	Judy Katschke	1995
#6	A Long Way Home	Bettina Ling	1995

==== Pocahontas Little Library ====
#	Novel	Author	Release date
#1	Setting Sail		1995
#2	A Proud People		1995
#3	When Two Worlds Meet		1995
#4	A Lesson in Friendship		1995

=== The Hunchback of Notre Dame ===
==== The Hunchback of Notre Dame: Six New Adventures ====
#	Novel	Author	Release date
#1	Djali the Gypsy		1996
#2	Frollo Meets His Match		1996
#3	Three of a Kind		1996
#4	The Missing Pieces		1996
#5	Horse Sense		1996
#6	Quasimodo the Brave		1996

==== The Hunchback of Notre Dame Little Library ====
#	Novel	Author	Release date
#1	Such a Busy City		1996
#2	Quasimodo's Bell Tower		1996
#3	At the Festival		1996
#4	Paris Pals		1996

=== Re-Tellings ===
Title	Author	Publisher	ISBN	Release date	Notes
Lady and the Tramp	Narinder Dhami		Puffin Books		
The Aristocats	Narinder Dhami		Puffin Books		
The Jungle Book	Narinder Dhami		Puffin Books		
The Lion King	Narinder Dhami		Puffin Books		
101 Dalmatians	Narinder Dhami		Puffin Books		
Alice in Wonderland	Narinder Dhami		Puffin Books		
Bambi	Narinder Dhami		Puffin Books		
Pinocchio	Narinder Dhami		Puffin Books		
Robin Hood	Narinder Dhami		Puffin Books		
The Hunchback of Notre Dame	Narinder Dhami		Puffin Books		

=== Pirates of the Caribbean ===
Title	Author	Publisher	ISBN	Release date	Notes
Pirates of the Caribbean: The Curse of the Black Pearl	Irene Trimble	Disney Press	2003		
Pirates of the Caribbean: Dead Man's Chest	Irene Trimble	Disney Press	2006		
Pirates of the Caribbean: At World's End	tui T. Sutherland, Elizabeth Rudnick	Disney Press	2007		
Pirates of the Caribbean: On Stranger Tides (2011)	James Ponti	Disney Press	April 2011		
The Price of Freedom	A.C. Crispin	Disney Editions	May 2011		
Pirates of the Caribbean: Dead Men Tell No Tales: The Brightest Star in the North: The Adventures of Carina Smyth	Meredith Rusu	Disney Press	2017		
Pirates of the Caribbean: Dead Men Tell No Tales	Elizabeth Rudnick	Disney Press	2017		

==== Jack Sparrow ====
#	Novel	Author	Release date
#1	The Coming Storm	Rob Kidd	May 22, 2006
#2	The Siren Song	Rob Kidd	May 22, 2006
#3	The Pirate Chase	Rob Kidd	July 24, 2006
#4	The Sword of Cortés	Rob Kidd	September 12, 2006
#5	The Age of Bronze	Rob Kidd	November 21, 2006
#6	Silver	Rob Kidd	January 23, 2007
#7	City of Gold	Rob Kidd	February 13, 2007
#8	The Timekeeper	Rob Kidd	July 31, 2007
#9	Dance of the Hours	Rob Kidd	September 25, 2007
#10	Sins of the Father	Rob Kidd	December 18, 2007
#11	Poseidon's Peak	Rob Kidd	April 29, 2008
#12	Bold New Horizons	Rob Kidd	July 29, 2008
#13	The Tale of Billy Turner and Other Stories	Rob Kidd	January 27, 2009

==== Legends of the Brethren Court ====
#	Novel	Author	Release date
#1	The Caribbean	Rob Kidd	October 14, 2008
#2	Rising in the East	Rob Kidd	December 9, 2008
#3	The Turning Tide	Rob Kidd	March 17, 2009
#4	Wild Waters	Rob Kidd	August 18, 2009
#5	Day of the Shadow	Rob Kidd	November 17, 2010

== Other ==
Title	Author	Publisher	ISBN	Release date	Notes
Nomads of the North	Gaylord DuBois	Golden Press	[none]	1960	Published nearly a year before the film's release in 1961.
Willie and the Yank	Stuart D. Ludlum	Scholastic Book Services		January 15, 1967	
The Mystery in Dracula's Castle	Vic Crume			1973	
Herbie the Matchmaker	Joe Claro			1982	

=== Aly & AJ Rock & Roll Mysteries ===
#	Novel	Author	Release date
#1	First Stop, New York	Tracey West & Katherine Noll	June 12, 2008
#2	Mayhem in Miami	Tracey West & Katherine Noll	June 12, 2008
#3	Singing in Seattle	Tracey West & Katherine Noll	September 4, 2008
#4	Nashville Nights	Tracey West & Katherine Noll	October 2, 2008

=== Annual publications ===
Title	Author	Publisher	ISBN	Release date	Notes
The Disney Annual 1998		Pedigree Books		1997	
Disney Annual 2006		Pedigree Books		2005	

=== Big Little Books ===
#	Novel	Author	Release date
#!	Mickey Mouse		
#726	Mickey Mouse in Blaggard Castle		
#731	Mickey Mouse - The Mail Pilot		
#750	Mickey Mouse Sails for Treasure Island		
#1128	Mickey Mouse and Pluto the Racer		
#1139	Mickey Mouse - The Detective		
#1160	Mickey Mouse and Bobo the Elephant		
#1169	Silly Symphony Featuring Donald Duck		
#1187	Mickey Mouse and the Sacred Jewel		
#1401	Mickey Mouse in The Treasure Hunt		
#1404	"Such a Life!" Says Donald Duck		
#1409	Mickey Mouse Runs His Own Newspaper		
#1411	Donald Duck and Ghost Morgan's Treasure		
#1413	Mickey Mouse and the 'Lectro Box		
#1417	Mickey Mouse on Sky Island		
#1422	Donald Duck Sees Stars		
#1424	Donald Duck Says Such Luck		
#1428	Mickey Mouse in the Foreign Legion		
#1429	Mickey Mouse and the Magic Lamp		
#1430	Donald Duck - Headed for Trouble		
#1432	Donald Duck and the Green Serpent		
#1434	Donald Forgets to Duck		
#1438	Donald Duck - Off the Beam		
#1441	Silly Symphony Featuring Donald Duck and His (Mis)Adventures		
#1444	Mickey Mouse in the World of Tomorrow		
#1449	Donald Duck Lays Down the Law		
#1451	Mickey Mouse and the Desert Palace		
#1453	Mickey Mouse and the Bat Bandit		
#1457	Donald Duck in Volcano Valley		
#1462	Donald Duck Gets Fed Up!		
#1463	Mickey Mouse and the Pirate Submarine		
#1464	Mickey Mouse and the Stolen Jewels		
#1471	Mickey Mouse and the Dude Ranch Bandit		
#1475	Mickey Mouse and the 7 Ghosts		
#1476	Mickey Mouse in the Race for Riches		
#1478	Donald Duck - Hunting for Trouble		
#1483	Mickey Mouse - Bell Boy Detective		
#1484	Donald Duck Is Here Again		
#1486	Donald Duck Up in the Air		

=== Disney Chapters ===
#	Novel	Author	Release date
#!	101 Dalmatians: Escape from De Vil Mansion	Gabrielle Charbonnet	1996
#!	Toy Story: I Come in Peace	Jan Carr	1996
#!	101 Dalmatians: Cruella Returns	Justine Corman	1997
#!	Aladdin: Jasmine's Story	Vanessa Elder	1997
#!	Beauty and the Beast: Belle's Story	Vanessa Elder	1997
#!	Flubber: My Story	Vanessa Elder	1997
#!	The Little Mermaid: Flounder to the Rescue	Bettina Ling	1997
#!	Hercules: I Made Herc a Hero by Phil	Gabrielle Charbonnet	1998
#!	Cinderella	Emily Stewart	1998
#!	Mighty Ducks: The First Face-Off	Debra Mostow Zakarin	1998
#!	The Lion King: Just Can't Wait to Be King	Gabrielle Charbonnet	1998
#!	Recess: The Experiment	Judy Katschke	1998
#!	Pepper Ann: Soccer Sensation	Nancy E. Krulik	1998
#!	Mulan: Mushu's Story	Justine Fontes	1998
#!	Countdown to Extinction	Barbara Gaines Winkelman	1998
#!	A Bug's Life: Flik to the Rescue	Jane B. Mason	1998
#!	Dinosaur: Zini's Big Adventure	Dona Smith	2000

==== Doug Chronicles ====
#	Novel	Author	Release date
#!	Doug's Big Comeback	Nancy E. Krulik	1998
#!	Doug's Hoop Nightmare	Sue Kassirer	1998
#!	Doug's Vampire Caper	Nancy E. Krulik	1998
#1	Lost in Space	Tim Grundmann	April 15, 1998
#2	Porkchop to the Rescue	Jim Rubin	April 15, 1998
#3	A Picture for Patti	Linda K. Garvey	June 15, 1998
#4	A Day with Dirtbike	Lisa Goldman	June 15, 1998
#5	Power Trip	Jeffrey Nodelman	August 15, 1998
#6	The Funnie Haunted House	Tim Grundmann	October 30, 1998
#7	Poor Roger	Bill Gross and Linda K. Garvey	December 15, 1998
#8	Winter Games	Tim Grundmann	February 1, 1999
#9	Doug Rules	Nancy E. Krulik	April 20, 1999
#10	Funnie Family Vacation	Pam Muñoz Ryan	June 20, 1999
#12	Itchy Situation	Jeffrey Nodelman	1999
#12	Doug and the End of the World	Dennis Garvey and Tommy Nichols	1999
#13	Doug Cheats	Linda K. Garvey, Danny Campbell and Kimberly Campbell	December 15, 1999
#!	Skeeter Loves Patti?	Pam Muñoz Ryan	January 19, 2000

=== Disney Fairies ===
==== Fairy Dust trilogy ====
#	Novel	Author	Release date
#1	Fairy Dust and the Quest for the Egg	Gail Carson Levine	2005
#2	Fairy Dust and the Quest for the Wand	Gail Carson Levine	2007
#3	Fairy Dust and the Quest for Never Land	Gail Carson Levine	2010

==== Tales of Pixie Hollow ====
#	Novel	Author	Release date
#!	The Trouble with Tink	Kiki Thorpe	
#!	Vidia and the Fairy Crown	Laura Driscoll	
#!	Beck and the Great Berry Battle	Laura Driscoll	
#!	Lily's Pesky Plant	Kirsten Larsen	
#!	Rani in the Mermaid Lagoon	Lisa Papademetriou	
#!	Fira and the Full Moon	Gail Herman	
#!	Tinker Bell Takes Charge	Eleanor Fremont	
#!	A Masterpiece for Bess	Lara Bergen	
#!	Prilla and the Butterfly Lie	Kitty Richards	
#!	Rani and the Three Treasures	Kimberly Morris	
#!	Tink, North of Never Land	Kiki Thorpe	
#!	Beck Beyond the Sea	Kimberly Morris	
#!	Dulcie's Taste of Magic	Gail Herman	
#!	Silvermist and the Ladybug Curse	Gail Herman	
#!	Fawn and the Mysterious Trickster	Laura Driscoll	
#!	Rosetta's Daring Day	Lisa Papademetriou	
#!	Iridessa, Lost at Sea	Lisa Papademetriou	
#!	Queen Clarion's Secret	Kimberly Morris	
#!	Myka Finds Her Way	Gail Herman	
#!	Lily in Full Bloom	Laura Driscoll	
#!	Vidia Meets Her Match	Kiki Thorpe	
#!	Four Clues for Rani	Catherine Daly	
#!	Trill Changes Her Tune	Gail Herman	
#!	Tink in a Fairy Fix	Kiki Thorpe	
#!	Rosetta's Dress Mess	Laura Driscoll	
#!	Art Lessons by Bess	Amy Vincent	

=== Disney First Readers ===
==== Level 1 ====
#	Novel	Author	Release date
#!	The Lion King: Roar!	Patricia Grossman	January 1997
#!	Pocahontas: Where's Flit?	Bettina Ling	September 1997
#!	Beauty and the Beast: Chip's Favorite Season	Patrick Daley	January 1998
#!	The Little Mermaid: Ariel's Treasure Hunt	Patricia Grossman	May 1998
#!	Cinderella: Run, Gus, Run!	Patrick Daley	1998

==== Level 2 ====
#	Novel	Author	Release date
#!	Beauty and the Beast: The Beast's Feast	Gail Tuchman	January 1997
#!	Aladdin: Abu Monkeys Around	Anne Schreiber	September 1997
#!	101 Dalmatians: Puppy Parade	Cecilia Venn	May 1998
#!	Pocahontas: Hide and Seek	Kathryn Cristaldi	May 1998
#!	The Lion King: Simba's Pouncing Lesson	Gail Tuchman	October 1998
#!	Lady and the Tramp: What's That Noise?	Carol Pugliano-Martin	October 1998
#!	A Bug's Life: Flik's Perfect Gift	Judy Katschke	January 2000

==== Level 3 ====
#	Novel	Author	Release date
#!	The Hunchback of Notre Dame: Parade Day	Kathryn Cristaldi	September 1997
#!	Aladdin: Genie School	K.A. Alistir	January 1998
#!	Toy Story: Buzz and the Bubble Planet	Judy Katschke	May 1998
#!	Hercules and the Maze of the Minotaur	Judith Bauer Stamper	May 1998
#!	Toy Story: To School - And Beyond!	Judy Katschke	October 1998
#!	Atlantis: The Lost Empire: Kida and the Crystal	K.A. Alistir	January 2002
#!	Monsters, Inc.: Boo on the Loose	Gail Herman	2002
#!	Lilo & Stitch: Go, Stitch, Go!	Monica Kulling	May 2002

=== Hollywood Pictures film novelizations ===
Title	Author	Publisher	ISBN	Release date	Notes
Arachnophobia	Nicholas Edwards			1990	
The Hand That Rocks the Cradle	Robert Tine			1992	
Encino Man	Nicholas Edwards			1992	
Super Mario Bros.	Todd Strasser			1993	
Crimson Tide	Richard P. Henrick			1995	
Judge Dredd	Neal Barrett, Jr.			1995	
Jack	Beth Nadler			1996	
The Sixth Sense	Peter Lerangis			1999	

=== Little Golden Books ===
#	Title	Author	Publisher	ISBN	Release date
D3	Dumbo		Simon & Schuster		
D5	Peter and the Wolf		Simon & Schuster		
D12	Once Upon a Wintertime	Tom Oreb	Simon & Schuster	[none]	1950
D14	Donald Duck's Adventure		Simon & Schuster		
D15	Mickey Mouse's Picnic		Simon & Schuster		
D16	Santa's Toy Shop	Al Dempster	Simon & Schuster	[none]	1950
D17	Cinderella's Friends	Jane Werner and Al Dempster	Simon & Schuster	[none]	1950
D18	Donald Duck's Toy Train	Jane Werner, Dick Kelsey and Bill Justice	Simon & Schuster	[none]	1950
D19	Alice in Wonderland Meets the White Rabbit	Jane Werner and Al Dempster	Simon & Schuster	[none]	
D20	Alice in Wonderland Finds the Garden of Live Flowers	Jane Werner and Campbell Grant	Simon & Schuster	[none]	
D21	Grandpa Bunny		Simon & Schuster		
D24	Peter Pan and Wendy		Simon & Schuster		
D25	Peter Pan and the Pirates		Simon & Schuster		
D26	Peter Pan and the Indians	Annie North Bedford	Simon & Schuster	[none]	
D27	Donald Duck and Santa Claus				
D29	Mickey Mouse and His Space Ship		Simon & Schuster		
D30	Pluto Pup Goes to Sea		Simon & Schuster		
D31	Hiawatha		Simon & Schuster		
D32	Mickey Mouse and Pluto Pup	Elizabeth Beecher and Campbell Grant	Simon & Schuster	[none]	1953
D33	Mickey Mouse Goes Christmas Shopping		Simon & Schuster		
D34	Donald Duck and the Witch		Simon & Schuster		
D37	Ben and Me		Simon & Schuster		
D38	Chip 'n' Dale at the Zoo	Annie North Bedford and Bill Bosch	Simon & Schuster	[none]	1954
D39	Donald Duck's Christmas Tree				
D43	Disneyland on the Air	Annie North Bedford and Samuel Armstrong	Simon & Schuster	[none]	
D44	Donald Duck in Disneyland	Annie North Bedford and Campbell Grant	Simon & Schuster	[none]	
D45	Davy Crockett, King of the Wild Frontier		Simon & Schuster		1955
D61	Sleeping Beauty				
D62	The Lucky Puppy				
D64	Paul Revere				1957
D65	Old Yeller	Irwin Shapiro	Simon & Schuster	[none]	1957
D66	Snow White and the Seven Dwarfs				
D68	Zorro				1958
D70	Scamp's Adventure				
D71	Sleeping Beauty and the Good Fairies				
D73	Big Red				
D75	The Sword in the Stone				
D76	The Wizards' Duel				
D77	Zorro and the Secret Plan	Charles Spain Verral	Simon & Schuster	[none]	1958
D79	Mother Goose				
D83	Goliath II		Simon & Schuster		
D84	Donald Duck and the Christmas Carol		Simon & Schuster		
D85	Uncle Remus		Simon & Schuster		
D86	Donald Duck Lost and Found		Simon & Schuster		
D87	Toby Tyler		Simon & Schuster		1960
D88	Scamp's Adventure		Simon & Schuster		
D89	Lucky Puppy				
D90	Bambi				
D91	Pollyanna	Elizabeth Beecher			
D93	Bedknobs and Broomsticks				
D94	Donald Duck: Private Eye				
D95	Swiss Family Robinson				
D98	Ludwig Von Drake				
D99	The Toy Soldiers				
D101	Pinocchio and the Whale				
D104	Savage Sam		Western Publishing Company		1963
D105	Surprise for Mickey Mouse		Western Publishing Company		
D112	Mickey and the Beanstalk		Western Publishing Company		
D113	Mary Poppins		Western Publishing Company		
D116	Winnie-the-Pooh: The Honey Tree		Western Publishing Company		
D117	Winnie-the-Pooh meets Gopher		Western Publishing Company		
D118	The Ugly Dachshund		Western Publishing Company		
D120	The Jungle Book		Western Publishing Company		
D121	Winnie-the-Pooh and Tigger		Western Publishing Company		
D123	Disneyland Parade with Donald Duck		Western Publishing Company		
D124	Pluto and the Adventure of the Golden Scepter		Western Publishing Company		
D126	Robin Hood		Western Publishing Company		1973
D127	Donald Duck and the Witch Next Door		Western Publishing Company		1974
D128	Robin Hood and the Daring Mouse		Western Publishing Company		1974
D129	Mickey Mouse and the Great Lot Plot		Western Publishing Company		1974
D130	The Love Bug: Herbie's Special Friend		Western Publishing Company		1974
D131	Donald Duck in America on Parade		Western Publishing Company		1974
D132	Bambi: Friends of the Forest		Western Publishing Company		1974
D133	Mickey Mouse: The Kitten-Sitters		Western Publishing Company		1974
D136	The Rescuers		Western Publishing Company	978-0307000705	1977
D137	Pete's Dragon		Western Publishing Company		1977
D138	Mickey Mouse and Goofy: The Big Bear Scare		Western Publishing Company		1977
100-43	Mickey Mouse and the Best-Neighbor Contest		Western Publishing Company		
100-57	Sport Goofy and the Racing Robot		Western Publishing Company		
100-58	Detective Mickey Mouse		Western Publishing Company		
100-60	Mickey Mouse Heads for the Sky		Western Publishing Company		
100-61	Mickey Mouse: Those Were the Days		Western Publishing Company		
100-63	Cowboy Mickey	Cindy West	Western Publishing Company	0-307-00100-8	1990
101-35	Winnie-the-Pooh: The Special Morning		Western Publishing Company		
101-36	Winnie-the-Pooh: A Day to Remember		Western Publishing Company		
101-44	Winnie-the-Pooh and the Honey Patch		Western Publishing Company		1980
101-61	Winnie the Pooh and the Missing Bullhorn		Western Publishing Company		
102-55	Donald Duck and the Biggest Dog in Town		Western Publishing Company		1986
102-57	DuckTales: The Secret City Under the Sea		Western Publishing Company		
102-58	DuckTales: The Hunt for the Giant Pearl		Western Publishing Company		
102-62	Winnie the Pooh: Eeyore, Be Happy!		Western Publishing Company		
102-67	Darkwing Duck: The Silly Canine Caper	Justine Korman	Western Publishing Company	0-307-00119-9	1992
103-55	Return to Oz: Dorothy Saves the Emerald City		Western Publishing Company	0-307-02029-0	1985
104-62	TaleSpin: Ghost Ship	Andrew Helfer	Western Publishing Company	0-307-00112-1	1991
104-65	Beauty and the Beast		Western Publishing Company		
104-70	Beauty and the Beast: The Teapot's Tale		Western Publishing Company		
104-71	Pocahontas		Western Publishing Company		
104-72	Pocahontas: The Voice of the Wind		Western Publishing Company		
105-47	Sport Goofy and the Racing Robot		Western Publishing Company	0-307-01057-0	1984
105-54	The Black Cauldron: Taran Finds a Friend		Western Publishing Company		1985
105-56	Return to Oz: Escape from the Witch's Castle		Western Publishing Company	0-307-02030-4	1985
105-68	The Little Mermaid: Ariel's Underwater Adventure; An Episode from the Movie	Michael Teitelbaum	Western Publishing Company	0-307-00105-9	1989
105-71	The Prince and the Pauper	Fran Manushkin	Western Publishing Company	0-307-00069-9	1990
105-78	Chip 'n Dale: Rescue Rangers: The Big Cheese Caper	Deborah Kovacs	Western Publishing Company	0-307-00646-8	1991
105-83	The Rescuers Down Under	Michael Teitelbaum	Western Publishing Company	978-0307000828	1990
107-52	The Lion King: The Cave Monster	Justine Korman	Western Publishing Company	0-307-30297-2	1996
107-88	Aladdin		Western Publishing Company		
107-89	Goof Troop: Great Egg-Spectations		Western Publishing Company		
107-92	Aladdin: The Magic Carpet Ride	Teddy Slater Margulies	Western Publishing Company	0-307-30144-3	1993
107-93	The Lion King				
107-97	The Lion King: No Worries; A New Story About Simba				
459-09	Mickey's Christmas Carol				1983
501	The Black Hole: A Spaceship Adventure for Robots		Western Publishing Company		1979

=== Touchstone Pictures film novelizations ===
Title	Author	Publisher	ISBN	Release date	Notes
Splash	Ian Don			1984	
Baby	Ian Don			1985	
Adventures in Babysitting	Elizabeth Faucher			1987	
Who Framed Roger Rabbit	Martin Noble			1988	
Dick Tracy	Max Allan Collins			1990	
The Nightmare Before Christmas	Daphne Skinner			1993	
Con Air	Richard Woodley			1997	
Armageddon	M. C. Bolin			1998	

=== Walt Disney Little Library ===
==== Series 1 ====
#	Novel	Author	Release date
#1	Minnie at the Beach		1988
#2	Mickey on the Farm		1988
#3	Donald in the Mountains		1988
#4	Goofy on Vacation		1988

==== Series 2 ====
#	Novel	Author	Release date
#1	Alice in Wonderland		1989
#2	Dumbo at the Airport		1989
#3	Winnie-the-Pooh Is Hungry		1989
#4	Lady at the Pond		1989

=== Walt Disney Presents: Annette ===
Title	Author	Publisher	ISBN	Release date	Notes
Annette: Sierra Summer					
Annette: The Desert Inn Mystery					
Annette and the Mystery at Moonstone Bay					
Annette and the Mystery at Smugglers' Cove					
Annette: Mystery at Medicine Wheel					

=== Walt Disney's Animal Adventures ===
Title	Author	Publisher	ISBN	Release date	Notes
The Odyssey of an Otter	Rutherford Montgomery	Golden Press	[none]	1960	
Weecha the Raccoon	Rutherford Montgomery	Golden Press	[none]	1960	
Cougar	Rutherford Montgomery	Golden Press	[none]	1961	
El Blanco - The Legend of the White Stallion	Rutherford Montgomery	Golden Press	[none]	1961	

=== Whitman Tell-A-Tale Books ===
#	Title	Author	Publisher	ISBN	Release date
2418	Mickey Mouse and the Second Wish		Whitman Publishing Company	[none]	1973
2424-2	Mickey Mouse and the World's Friendliest Monster		Whitman Publishing Company	[none]	1976
2424-3	Mickey Mouse and the Pet Show		Whitman Publishing Company	[none]	1976
2454-34	Mickey Mouse and the Really Neat Robot		Whitman Publishing Company	[none]	1970
2612	Goofy and His Wonderful Cornet	Homer Brightman	Whitman Publishing Company	[none]	1964
2616	Peter Pan and the Tiger		Whitman Publishing Company	[none]	1976
2622:15	One Hundred and One Dalmatians: For Everyone Who Love Dogs	James Fletcher	Whitman Publishing Company	[none]	1960

=== The Wonderful World of Disney ===
Title	Author	Publisher	ISBN	Release date	Notes
The Whiz Kid and the Carnival Caper	Vic Crume			September 1975	
Mustang!	Kathleen N. Daly			September 1975	
Davy Crockett, Indian Fighter	Barbara Shook Hazen			September 1975	
The Sky's the Limit	Vic Crume			September 1975	
Dr. Syn, Alias the Scarecrow	Vic Crume			November 1975	
Two Against the Arctic	Dorothy Branner Francis			January 1976	
My Dog, the Thief	Barbara Shook Hazen			January 1976	
Tonka	Kathleen N. Daly			January 1976	
Napoleon and Samantha	Vic Crume			January 1976	
Cristobalito	Kathleen N. Daly			October 1976	

=== The Wuzzles ===
==== Collector Series ====
#	Novel	Author	Release date
#1	Butterbear Plants a Surprise		
#2	Moosel's Special Gift		
#3	Eleroo's Big Surprise		
#4	Win One for Bumblelion		
#5	Hoppopotamus Plays Detective		
#6	Rhinokey's Opening Night		
#7	Skowl Fixes Things for Crock		
#8	Woolrus' Sleepy Time Pal		
#9	Piggypine's Weighty Problem		
#10	Tycoon Comes Through		
#11	Koalakeet Saves the Day		
#12	A Hot Tip for Pandeaver		

== Winnie the Pooh ==
=== Out & About With Pooh - A Grow and Learn Library ===
#	Title	Author	Release date
#1	Good as Gold		
#2	A Perfect Little Piglet		
#3	The Friendship Garden		
#4	Look Before You Bounce		
#5	The Honey Cake Mix-Up		
#6	Eeyore's Happy Tail		
#7	There's No Place Like Home		
#8	Fun Is Where You Find It		
#9	Sweet Dreams		
#10	Weather or Not		
#11	The Perfect Pet		
#12	Cozy Beds		
#13	A Wonderful Wind		
#14	Rain, Rain, Come Again		
#15	Eeyore's Lucky Day		
#16	Rabbit's Ears		
#17	The Bug Hunt		
#18	Owl's World		

== See also ==
- Disney Publishing Worldwide
