= KHIL =

Classic country radio station in Willcox, Arizona, United States

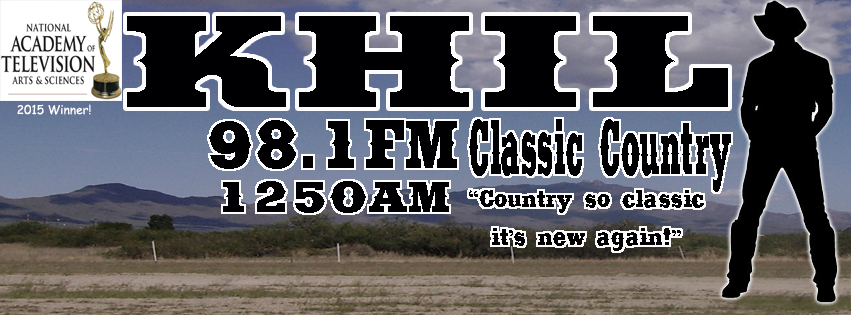
- Willcox, Arizona; United States
- Frequency: 1250 kHz
- Branding: Classic Country

Programming
- Format: Classic country

Ownership
- Owner: John Oberreuter and Mark Lucke; (Willcox Radio, LLC)

History
- Former call signs: KWCX (1961–1963)
- Call sign meaning: Hills surrounding Willcox, Arizona

Technical information
- Licensing authority: FCC
- Facility ID: 72656
- Class: D
- Power: 5,000 watts (day); 196 watts (night)
- Transmitter coordinates: 32°16′0.3″N 109°50′0.2″W
- Translator: 98.1 K251CG (Wilcox)

Links
- Public license information: Public file; LMS
- Webcast: Listen live
- Website: adm.hjx.mybluehost.me

KHIL (1250 AM, "Classic Country") is a radio station licensed to Willcox, Arizona, United States. The station is owned by John Oberreuter and Mark Lucke, through licensee Willcox Radio, LLC. It airs a classic country music format. The station is also simulcast over FM translator K251CG (98.1 FM) in Willcox.

The station was founded in 1958 by Rex Allen. It was assigned its KHIL call letters by the Federal Communications Commission.

In 2007, KHIL applied to relocate to Kearny, Arizona, with a change in frequency to 1260 kHz and a power upgrade 10,000 watts. This application was dismissed by the FCC on April 21, 2008, and KHIL remains in Willcox with a daytime power of 5,000 watts. At that time, Lucke had become the only paid employee (down from a staff of 10 in 2003).

KHIL was featured in a December 2018 in a documentary published by The Atlantic, Lonesome Willcox. A June 2019 report in The Guardian portrayed the station as being at the risk of closure, with Lucke keeping operations up without pay.

Lucke is no longer involved with the station.

== Ownership ==
In April 2002, Lakeshore Media LLC completed its purchase of KHIL and KWCX-FM from Cathy Ann Enterprises LLC. The sale price was reported to be $1.1 million.

In March 2003, Clear Channel Communications reached a deal to acquire KHIL and KWCX-FM from Lakeshore Media LLC for $2.5 million, but that deal was contingent on the relocation of KWCX-FM to the Tucson area. The FCC denied the move and the deal fell through.

In July 2007, KZLZ LLC reached an agreement to acquire KHIL and KWCX-FM from Lakeshore Media LLC for a reported sale price of $900,000.

Effective November 22, 2017, KZLZ LLC sold KHIL to Willcox Radio, LLC for $150,000.

== Translator ==
Broadcast translator for KHIL
Call sign	Frequency	City of license	FID	ERP (W)	Class	Transmitter coordinates	FCC info
K251CG	98.1 FM	Willcox, Arizona	144678	50	D	32°16′1.27″N 109°50′2.24″W	LMS
