= Vanishing Wilderness =

- Directed by: Arthur Dubs
- Produced by: Arthur Dubs
- Narrated by: Rex Allen
- Cinematography: Heinz Sielmann
- Release date: January 3, 1973 (Los Angeles)
- Country: USA
- Language: English
- Budget: $128,000
- Box office: $7.4 million (US rentals)

Vanishing Wilderness is a 1973 American wilderness documentary from Arthur Dubs who established Pacific International Enterprises. It was filmed by Heinz Sielmann. Areas covered included Oregon's Rogue River, the Arctic Circle, Alaska and the Florida Everglades.

In contrast with Dubs' previous documentary, American Wilderness, which focused on hunting, Vanishing Wilderness was more of a family film and was rated "G".

The film received endorsements from then-governor Ronald Reagan and John Wayne.

== Production ==
It was filmed over five years. The film starred Dubs, his family and friends. It was narrated by Rex Allen.

== Reception ==
The film was released in the Los Angeles area on January 3, 1973, on a four-wall distribution basis and grossed $341,000 in its first week and $1 million in three weeks. It went on to earn theatrical rentals of $7.4 million in the United States and Canada.

The San Francisco Chronicle called it "a superb glimpse of wid species." Leonard Maltin too praised the film although he found the narration excessively present.
