= Willcox, Arizona =

City in Arizona, United States

Willcox
- City
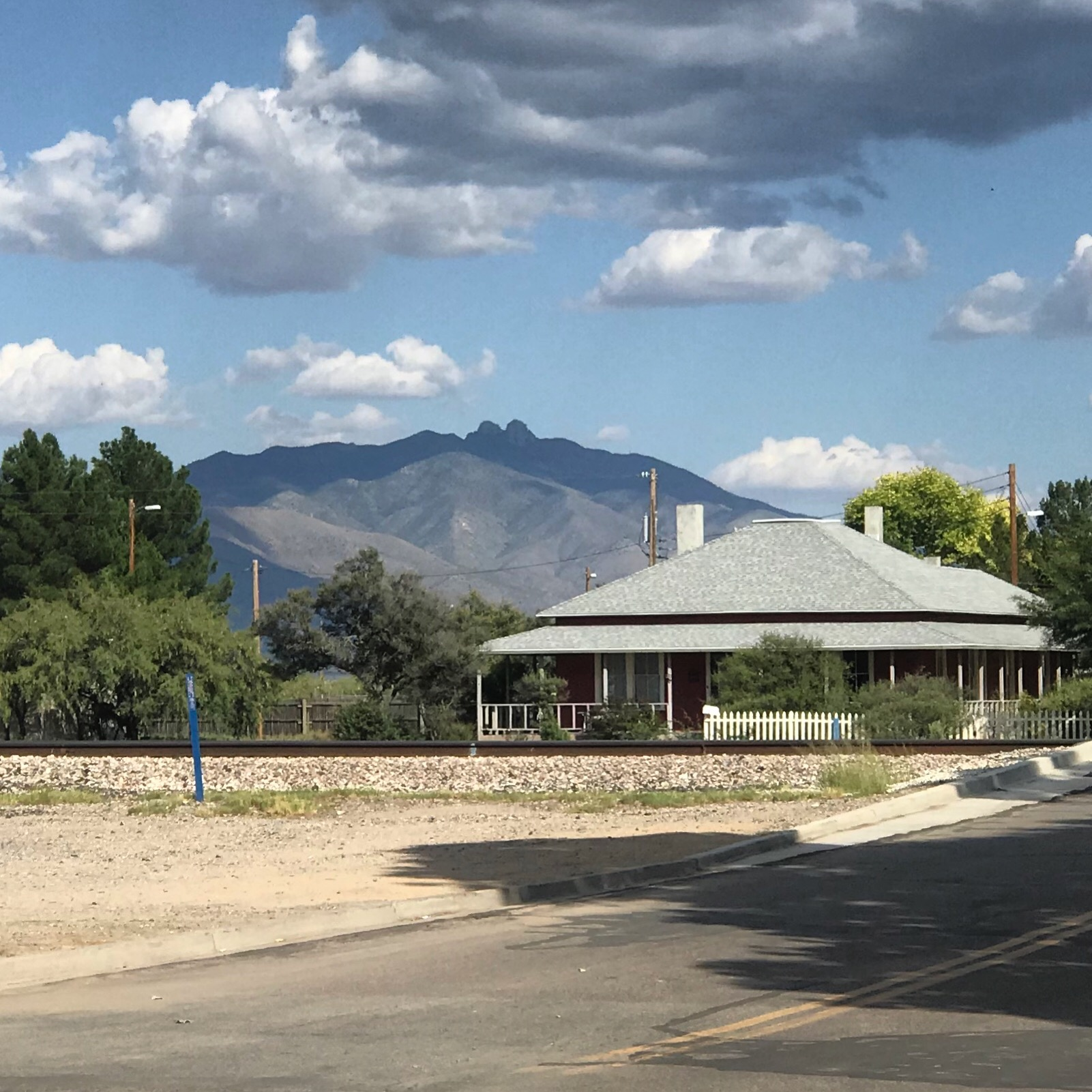
- View of Dos Cabezas peaks from downtown Willcox

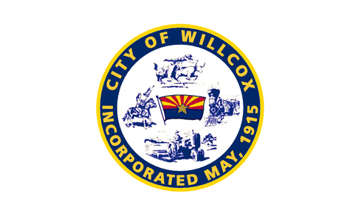
- Flag

- Location of Willcox in Cochise County, Arizona

- Location in the United States Location in Arizona
- Coordinates: 32°14′40″N 109°49′55″W
- Country: United States
- State: Arizona
- County: Cochise
- Founded: 1880
- Incorporated: 1915

Area
  - Total: 6.28 sq mi (16.27 km^{2})
  - Land: 6.15 sq mi (15.92 km^{2})
  - Water: 0.14 sq mi (0.35 km^{2})
- Elevation: 4,170 ft (1,270 m)

Population (2020)
  - Total: 3,213
  - Density: 522.6/sq mi (201.76/km^{2})
- Time zone: UTC−7 (MST (no DST))
- ZIP Codes: 85643-85644
- Area code: 520
- FIPS code: 04-83090
- GNIS feature ID: 2412266
- Website: willcox.az.gov

Willcox is a city in Cochise County, Arizona, United States. As of the 2020 census, Willcox had a population of 3,213. The city is located in the Sulphur Springs Valley, a flat and sparsely populated drainage basin dotted with seasonal lakes. The city is surrounded by Arizona's most prominent mountain ranges, including the Pinaleño Mountains and the Chiricahua Mountains.

Six of Arizona's ten largest mountains are located within a 70-mile radius including Mount Graham (31 miles north), which is Arizona's most prominent mountain, Chiricahua Peak (42 miles southeast), Mount Lemmon (57 miles west), Miller Peak (65 miles southwest), Mica Mountain (41 miles west), and Mount Wrightson (70 miles southwest). Scores of birds, including sandhill cranes, winter in the area, with some migrating from as far away as Siberia. A very large dry lakebed, the Willcox Playa, is located five miles south of the city. It is the remnant of the Ice Age-era Lake Cochise.

Willcox's high desert climate gives it large diurnal temperature variation, making it ideal for wine cultivation.

== History ==
Originally known as "Maley", the town was founded in 1880 as a whistlestop on the Southern Pacific Railroad because of its position approximately halfway between El Paso, Texas and Phoenix, Arizona. It was renamed in honor of a visit by General Orlando B. Willcox in 1889. In the early 20th century, Willcox was a national leader in cattle production. Agriculture remains important to the local economy, but Interstate 10 has replaced the railroad as the major transportation link, and much of the economy is tied to the highway, which runs immediately north of the town.

Willcox is the birthplace of Rex Allen, known as "The Arizona Cowboy", who wrote and recorded many songs, starred in several Westerns during the early 1950s and in the syndicated television series Frontier Doctor (1958–1959). Parts of the 1993 American neo-noir film Red Rock West starring Nicolas Cage, Lara Flynn Boyle, J. T. Walsh and Dennis Hopper were filmed in Willcox. A short film documentary called "Lonesome Willcox" released in 2018 documented the town's country music radio station KHIL.

Willcox became Arizona's second federally designated wine-growing region in 2016.

== Geography ==
Willcox is located in northern Cochise County, in the Sulphur Springs Valley. Interstate 10 serves the city with three exits and leads 35 miles (56 km) southwest to Benson and 74 miles (119 km) east to Lordsburg, New Mexico. According to the United States Census Bureau, the city has a total area of 6.3 square miles (16.3 km^{2}), of which 6.1 square miles (15.9 km^{2}) is land and 0.12 square miles (0.3 km^{2}), or 2.13%, is water.

=== Notable Mountains ===
Mountain	Height (base to peak)	Rank (Arizona)	Rank (US Lower 48)	Miles from Willcox	Peak Elevation	Mountain Range
Mount Graham	6,340	1	20	30	10,720	Pinaleño Mountains
Mount Lemmon	5,177	3	54	56	9,157	Catalina Mountains
Chiricahua Peak	5,149	4	55	40	9,759	Chiricahua Mountains
Miller Peak	5,011	5	57	63	9,466	Huachuca Mountains
Mica Mountain	4,604	7	77	40	8,664	Rincon Mountains
Mount Wrightson	4,591	8	78	69	9,453	Santa Rita Mountains
Dos Cabezas Peaks	3,244	19	-	11	8,354	Dos Cabezas Mountains
Bassett Peak	3,133	23	-	30	7,663	Galiuro Mountains
Apache Peak	2,899	29	-	45	7,711	Whetstone Mountains
Mount Glenn	2,899	29	-	21	7,519	Dragoon Mountains

== Climate ==
Willcox's high elevation gives it a milder climate than the nearby Valley of the Sun and Sonoran Desert. It also receives more rainfall than Tucson and Phoenix due to the summer monsoon rains and thus it has a cold semi-arid climate (Koppen: BSk).

Climate data for Willcox, Arizona, 1991–2020 normals, extremes 1903–present
Month	Jan	Feb	Mar	Apr	May	Jun	Jul	Aug	Sep	Oct	Nov	Dec	Year
Record high °F (°C)	85 (29)	88 (31)	98 (37)	99 (37)	105 (41)	112 (44)	110 (43)	109 (43)	105 (41)	101 (38)	91 (33)	81 (27)	112 (44)
Mean maximum °F (°C)	72.6 (22.6)	77.2 (25.1)	83.7 (28.7)	90.1 (32.3)	97.5 (36.4)	104.7 (40.4)	104.9 (40.5)	101.6 (38.7)	98.6 (37.0)	92.7 (33.7)	82.2 (27.9)	73.4 (23.0)	106.3 (41.3)
Mean daily maximum °F (°C)	61.3 (16.3)	64.9 (18.3)	71.9 (22.2)	78.7 (25.9)	87.2 (30.7)	96.6 (35.9)	96.1 (35.6)	93.6 (34.2)	90.4 (32.4)	81.7 (27.6)	70.5 (21.4)	60.2 (15.7)	79.4 (26.3)
Daily mean °F (°C)	44.9 (7.2)	48.4 (9.1)	54.1 (12.3)	60.2 (15.7)	68.4 (20.2)	77.7 (25.4)	80.8 (27.1)	79.1 (26.2)	73.8 (23.2)	63.3 (17.4)	52.4 (11.3)	44.2 (6.8)	62.3 (16.8)
Mean daily minimum °F (°C)	28.4 (−2.0)	31.8 (−0.1)	36.2 (2.3)	41.6 (5.3)	49.7 (9.8)	58.8 (14.9)	65.5 (18.6)	64.6 (18.1)	57.3 (14.1)	44.9 (7.2)	34.3 (1.3)	28.2 (−2.1)	45.1 (7.3)
Mean minimum °F (°C)	17.2 (−8.2)	20.3 (−6.5)	24.5 (−4.2)	29.7 (−1.3)	37.7 (3.2)	47.7 (8.7)	56.3 (13.5)	56.5 (13.6)	46.3 (7.9)	30.7 (−0.7)	21.1 (−6.1)	16.6 (−8.6)	13.9 (−10.1)
Record low °F (°C)	−1 (−18)	2 (−17)	6 (−14)	9 (−13)	18 (−8)	27 (−3)	42 (6)	41 (5)	30 (−1)	15 (−9)	8 (−13)	−7 (−22)	−7 (−22)
Average precipitation inches (mm)	1.02 (26)	0.93 (24)	0.66 (17)	0.22 (5.6)	0.34 (8.6)	0.45 (11)	2.62 (67)	2.48 (63)	1.21 (31)	0.68 (17)	0.70 (18)	1.09 (28)	12.40 (315)
Average snowfall inches (cm)	0.6 (1.5)	0.6 (1.5)	0.1 (0.25)	0.0 (0.0)	0.0 (0.0)	0.0 (0.0)	0.0 (0.0)	0.0 (0.0)	0.0 (0.0)	0.0 (0.0)	0.2 (0.51)	0.2 (0.51)	1.7 (4.27)
Average precipitation days (≥ 0.01 in)	5.2	5.0	3.3	1.8	2.0	2.5	10.2	10.8	6.2	3.6	3.2	5.1	58.9
Average snowy days (≥ 0.1 in)	0.3	0.5	0.3	0.0	0.0	0.0	0.0	0.0	0.0	0.0	0.1	0.3	1.5
Source 1: NOAA
Source 2: National Weather Service

== Economy ==
Willcox's primary industries are agriculture, wine production, and tourism.

Major employers in Willcox include Riverview LLP, NatureSweet greenhouse, Northern Cochise Community Hospital, Valley Telephone Cooperative, the Border Patrol, Safeway, and Willcox Unified School District.

The wine industry employs over 400 people in the region. The agricultural producers in the area employ many hundreds of workers as well.

=== Wine country ===
The Willcox wine region produces 74 percent of the wine grapes grown in the state of Arizona. Willcox is the largest grape-growing region in Arizona and grows more wine grapes than any other region in the state and offers a wide variety of wines to choose from. Grape varietals grown include Petite Sirah, Malvasia Bianca, Sangiovese, Chenin blanc, Syrah, Colombard, Sauvignon blanc, Corvina, Merlot, Malbec, Tannat, Cabernet Franc, Chardonnay, Tempranillo, Cabernet Sauvignon and Mourvèdre.

== Arts, events, culture ==
Willcox has two festival seasons in the spring and fall.

Spring events include the Willcox Wine Country Spring Festival, which takes place the third weekend of May, and the Willcox West Fest in April.

Fall events include Rex Allen Days, which is a multi-day event that takes place the first weekend in October, the Willcox Wine Country Fall Festival, which takes place the 3rd weekend of October, the Willcox Flyer Bike Ride, which takes place the first Saturday of September, and the BoulderDash 13k/30k, which takes place in mid-October.

Winter festivals include the Christmas Light Parade and Craft Fair in December, and Wings Over Willcox Birding Festival which takes place over Martin Luther King Jr. Weekend.

Rex Allen Days was started in 1951 to honor Rex Allen. The event includes the annual parade, rodeos, fairs, car show and more.

Willcox Wine Country's two festivals are usually the third weekends of May and October. The event grows in size every year and includes live music and multiple arts and crafts vendors. Willcox Wine Festivals is listed as one of the top 10 wine festivals in North America.

Willcox West Fest celebrates Willcox's cowboy culture which is still active today through generations of ranching families. The event consists of a rodeo and a chuck wagon cook-off and usually occurs in April.

Saguaro Man is the official AZ Burners regional Burning Man gathering celebrating different arts including fire arts. The event happens at the end of April each year on their land southeast of the city.

== Demographics ==
Historical population
Census	Pop.	Note	%±
1890	396		—
1910	1,632		—
1920	905		−44.5%
1930	806		−10.9%
1940	884		9.7%
1950	1,266		43.2%
1960	2,441		92.8%
1970	2,568		5.2%
1980	3,243		26.3%
1990	3,122		−3.7%
2000	3,733		19.6%
2010	3,757		0.6%
2020	3,213		−14.5%
U.S. Decennial Census

=== 2020 census ===
As of the 2020 census, Willcox had a population of 3,213. The median age was 34.9 years. 27.2% of residents were under the age of 18 and 16.3% of residents were 65 years of age or older. For every 100 females there were 92.9 males, and for every 100 females age 18 and over there were 89.0 males age 18 and over.

0.0% of residents lived in urban areas, while 100.0% lived in rural areas.

There were 1,268 households in Willcox, of which 34.5% had children under the age of 18 living in them. Of all households, 39.5% were married-couple households, 18.0% were households with a male householder and no spouse or partner present, and 33.1% were households with a female householder and no spouse or partner present. About 28.3% of all households were made up of individuals and 13.8% had someone living alone who was 65 years of age or older.

There were 1,512 housing units, of which 16.1% were vacant. The homeowner vacancy rate was 5.4% and the rental vacancy rate was 10.2%.

Racial composition as of the 2020 census
Race	Number	Percent
White	1,650	51.4%
Black or African American	29	0.9%
American Indian and Alaska Native	67	2.1%
Asian	30	0.9%
Native Hawaiian and Other Pacific Islander	6	0.2%
Some other race	627	19.5%
Two or more races	804	25.0%
Hispanic or Latino (of any race)	1,859	57.9%

=== 2000 census ===
As of the census of 2000, there were 3,733 people, 1,383 households, and 947 families residing in the city. The population density was 622.3 inhabitants per square mile (240.3/km^{2}). The racial makeup of the city was 75.0% White, 0.7% Black or African American, 1.6% Native American, 0.8% Asian, 0.1% Pacific Islander, 17.6% from other races, and 4.2% from two or more races. 41.7% of the population were Hispanic or Latino of any race. The median income for a household in the city was $24,334. 21.6% of families and 27.0% of the population were below the poverty line, including 36.6% of those under age 18 and 24.6% of those age 65 or over.

== Media ==
KHIL "Classic Country" 1250 AM and 98.1 FM has served the region since 1958. Arizona Range News is a weekly newspaper covering Cochise County and originated in 1884.

== Associated people ==
- Rex Allen (1920–1999), film and television actor, singer and songwriter
- Ted DiBiase (born 1954), American former professional wrestler
- Warren Earp (1855–1900), youngest of the Earp brothers, buried here.
- Lilly McElroy (born 1980), photographer
- Tanya Tucker (born 1958), American country music artist, spent early childhood in Willcox
- Chalky Wright (1912–1957), boxing champion in International Boxing Hall of Fame

== See also ==
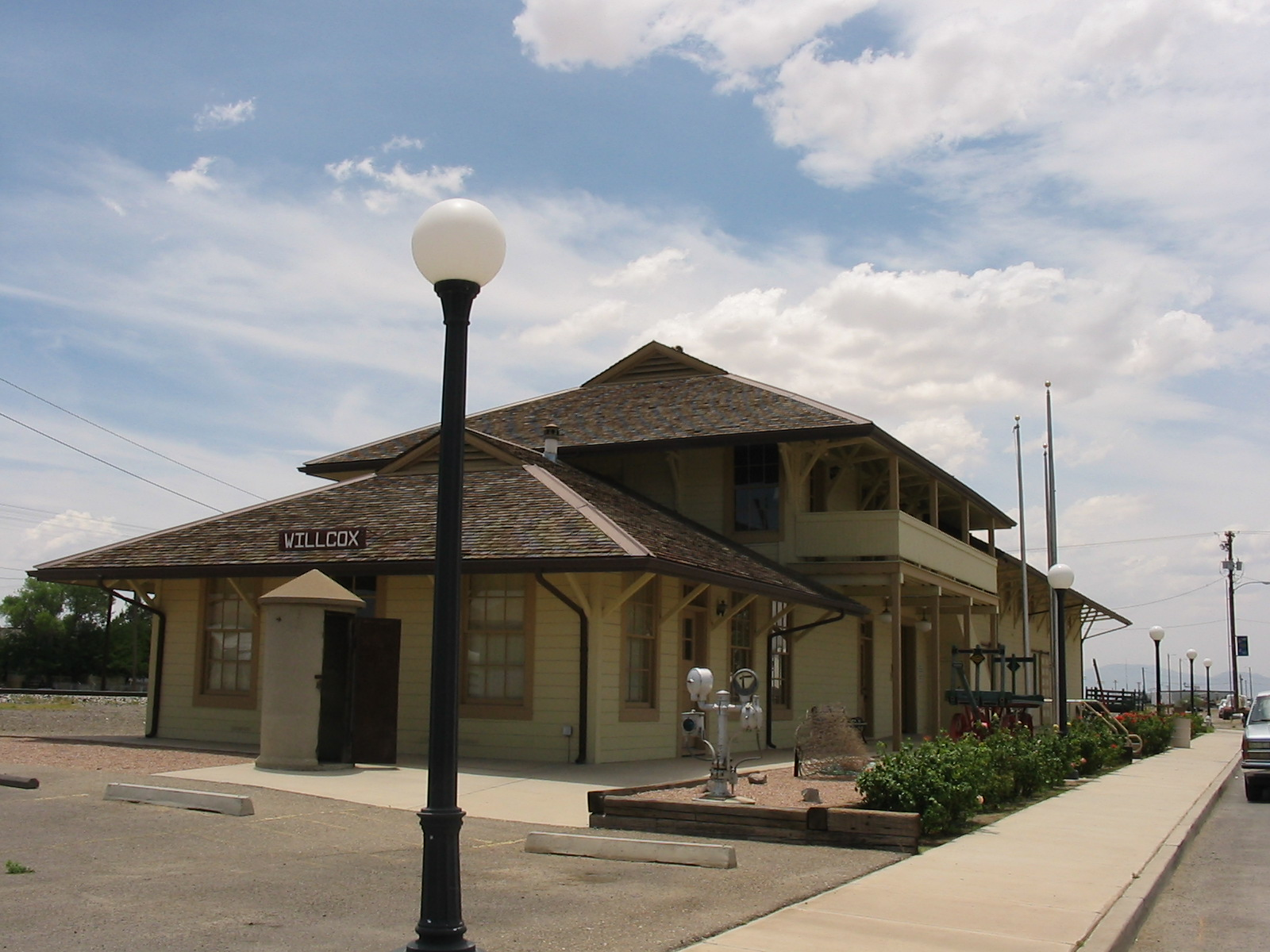
Willcox City Hall

- Rex Allen Arizona Cowboy Museum and Willcox Cowboy Hall of Fame
