= Rex Allen Arizona Cowboy Museum and Willcox Cowboy Hall of Fame =

Hall of Fame for Cowboys

Arizona Cowboy Museum & Willcox Cowboy Hall of Fame
- Established: 1989
- Location: 150 N. Railroad Avenue, Wilcox, AZ 85643, United States
- Coordinates: 32.252742°N 109.831045°W
- Type: Hall of fame
- Website: RAACM

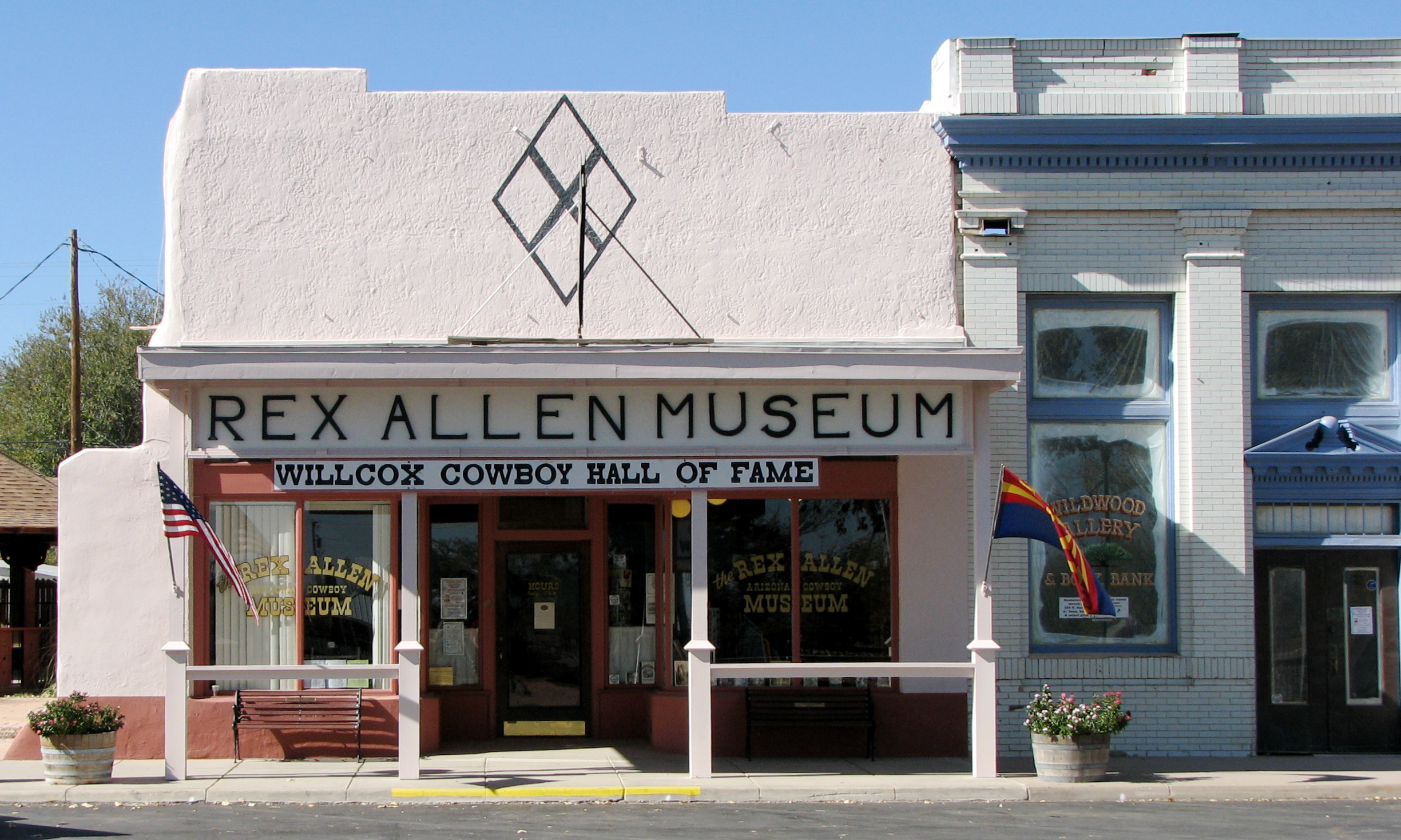
Rex Allen "Arizona Cowboy" Museum and Willcox Cowboy Hall of Fame

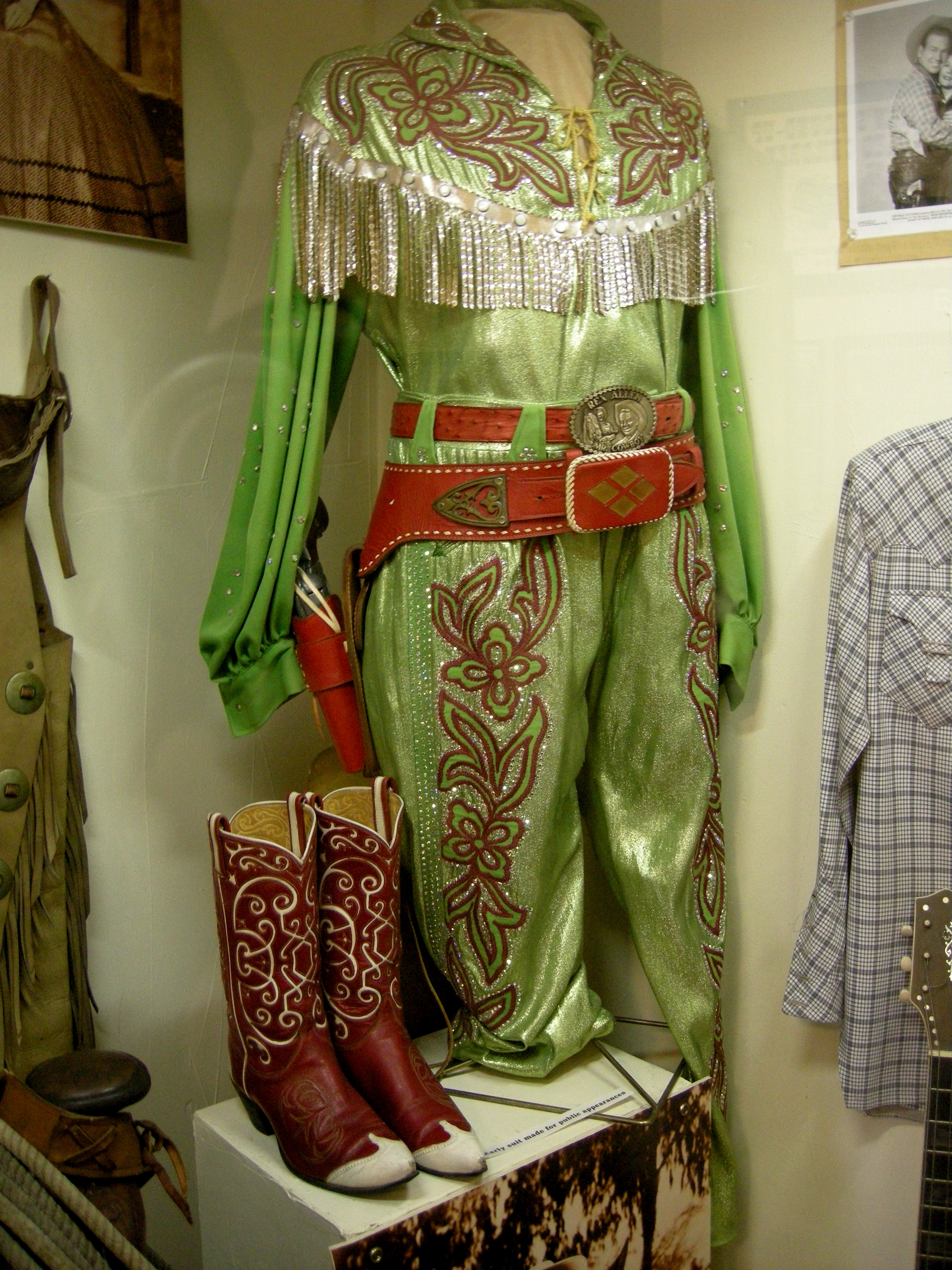
A Western outfit and boots worn by Rex Allen

The Rex Allen Arizona Cowboy Museum and Willcox Cowboy Hall of Fame, is a museum in Willcox, Arizona, United States. Rex Elvie Allen (1920-1999), born and raised 40 miles north of Willcox, was known as the "Arizona Cowboy" and "Mister Cowboy". Allen was an authentic cowboy. Allen was an American film and television actor, singer and songwriter. He became famous in the 1950s as one of the last singing cowboys, and as the narrator of many Disney nature and Western productions.

The museum includes photographs, movie posters, cowboy outfits, records, musical instruments and other memorabilia. Across the street from the museum is a bronze statue of Rex Allen. It features the memorabilia of local actor and singer Rex Allen. The Willcox Cowboy Hall of Fame features portraits of area old-time cowboys who worked in the ranch industry.

== Hall of fame inductees ==
The hall of fame was started on September 10, 1983.

1983

- Kortsen, Ted
- Wien, Ray
- Busenbark, Bill
- Sanders, Ben
- Browning, Ernest
- Sommer, Harry

1984

- Hudson, Jim
- Wilson, Bert
- Moore, Larry

1985

- Gardner, Claud
- Warren, Mila
- Leon, Juan Sierra

1986

- Harris, H. L. "Butch"
- Adams, Lloyd

1987

- Saxon, Harry
- Riggs, Billie

1988

- Gardner, B. A.
- Page, G. W. "Boozer"
- Hurtado, Florencio "Lencho"

1989

- Byrd, Cecil M.
- Whelan, William "Billy" H
- Larsen, Sabina

1990

- Lane, Elvie
- Riggs, Brannick
- Hooker, Henry Clay
- Busenbark, Jack

1991

- DeBorde, Will
- Wear, W.D. "Dee" Jr.
- Martin, Caleb

1992

- Prude, Charles
- Ellis, Lyter
- Stansberry, Alfred

1993

- Cook, Mark
- Cook, Tay
- Salazar, Lupe
- Hall, Ned
- Lawson, Charles "Chuck"

1994

- Cooke, Calvin
- Wootan, J. Frank

1995

- Riggs, Lillian Erickson
- DeBorde, Edd
- Moore, Gus
- Riggs, Stark

1996

- Prestridge, William S. "Bill"
- Bull, Joseph Jackson "Joe"
- Kuykendall, Leslie R.
- Gillespie, Charles E.

1997

- Jernigan, A. A. "Dee"
- Allen, Horace
- Snure, Ben Jr.

1998

- McNair, Claude
- Baker, Monroe
- Dubois, Marcellus

1999

- Browning, Alvin
- Klump, John Sherman
- Byrd, Homer
- Tenney, Lyman

2000

- Klump, John Daniel
- Lawhon, Josie
- Harris, Dave
- Ayala, Val

2001

- Whelan, Eddie
- Cowan, William "Butterfly"
- Vindiola, Rocky
- Durham, Archie

2002

- Martin, Thomas Jensen
- Riggs, Paul William
- Fortenberry, Claude W.
- Cowan, Ralph C.

2003

- Gardner, Bert
- Pride, Benjamin "Tuffy"
- Wood, Jack

2004

- DeRacy, Bill
- Post, Clarence "C.E."
- Davenport, Jack
- Nelson, Jack

2005

- MacGaffin, John O.
- Monzingo, Peggy
- Sellman, Tom
- Moyer, Ed

2006

- Moorehead, Buck
- Lowrey, Dan
- Shannon, Les
- Davis, Sonny

2007

- Winkler, Bill
- Darnell, Fred
- Boss, Roy Oscar

2008

- Shores, Sonny
- Straub, Bob
- Todd, Larry

2009

- Klump, Karry "Keith"
- Moore, L.E. "Larry" Jr.
- Tunks, Jack
- Self, Jim

2010

- Kuykendall, Tom
- Burgess, Terry Lan McNair

2011

- Krentz, Rob
- Hudson, Marvin
- Dobson, H.C. (Jay)

2012

- Post, Jack
- Robbs, R.L.
- Bourne, Chad

2013

- Bowman, Lewis
- Telles, Fred

2014

- Monk, Edward
- Goodwin, Robert Sewell
- Brawley, Norman "Pete"

2015

- Glenn, Marvin
- Klump, Wayne

2016

- Kimble, Don
- Whelan, Joe

2017

- Edington, Gilbert S. "Sam"
- Glenn, Warner

2018

- Riggs, Ellerbe B.
- Searle, Ron

2019

- Cannon, Jo
- Tout, Jim

2020

- Kimble, Ralph B.
- Darnell, Billy

2021

- Thrasher, Gary
- Todd, Larrie "Rooster"
