= Iron Mountain Trail =

1953 film by William Witney

- Theatrical release poster
- Directed by: William Witney
- Screenplay by: Gerald Geraghty
- Story by: William Lively
- Produced by: Edward J. White
- Starring: Rex Allen; Slim Pickens; Grant Withers; Nan Leslie; Roy Barcroft; Forrest Taylor
- Cinematography: Bud Thackery
- Edited by: Tony Martinelli
- Music by: Stanley Wilson
- Production company: Republic Pictures
- Distributed by: Republic Pictures
- Release date: May 8, 1953
- Running time: 54 minutes
- Country: United States
- Language: English

Iron Mountain Trail is a 1953 American Western film directed by William Witney and written by Gerald Geraghty. The film stars Rex Allen, Slim Pickens, Grant Withers, Nan Leslie, Roy Barcroft and Forrest Taylor. The film was released on May 8, 1953, by Republic Pictures.

== Cast ==
- Rex Allen as Rex Allen
- Koko as Koko
- Slim Pickens as Slim Pickens
- Grant Withers as Roger McCall
- Nan Leslie as Nancy Sawyer
- Roy Barcroft as Mate Orrin
- Forrest Taylor as Sam Sawyer
- Al Bridge as The Marshal
- John Hamilton as Circuit Judge
- George Lloyd as John Brockway
