= Lilly McElroy =

American photographer (born 1980)

- Born: 1980 (age 45–46); Willcox, Arizona, U.S.
- Occupation: Photographer
- Known for: "I Throw Myself At Men"
- Website: lillymcelroy.com/home.html

Lilly McElroy (born 1980, in Willcox, Arizona) is an American photographer. Her best known effort might be "I Throw Myself At Men", which involved her boyfriend, later husband, photographing her as she literally threw herself at men.

== Exhibitions (selection) ==
- 2000 Spring Show – Solar Culture Gallery, Tucson
- 2003 Locations – Lionel Romback Gallery Solo Exhibition, Tucson
- 2004 Last Show – Flash Gallery, Tucson
- 2005 Wish/Alchemy – Center on Contemporary Art, Seattle
- 2006 WPA/C's Experimental Media Series – Cowboys, Clichés, Codes, and Conspiracies, Corcoran Gallery of Art, Washington, DC
- 2007 Lilly invites you to watch the sunset with her – Roger Smith Lab Gallery NY
- 2008 8th International Photographic Triennial – Tampere
- 2008 I throw myself at men – Thomas Robertello Gallery, Chicago
- 2008 Three Hours Between Planes – Werkschauhalle Leipzig
- 2009 Łódź Fotofestiwal, Łódź
- 2009 Gravity Buffs – Thomas Robertello Gallery, Chicago
- 2009 I kicked a dog. – Hudson D. Walker Gallery, Provincetown, MA
- 2010 2009 Was A Rough Year Project
- 2010 Framed – Indianapolis Museum of Art, Indianapolis
- 2011 Lilly McElroy - Southeastern Center for Contemporary Art (SECCA), Winston-Salem, NC
- 2012 Contemporary Relationships - Indiana University Art Museum, Bloomington, IN
