= The Hound That Thought He Was a Raccoon =

- Directed by: Tom McGowan
- Based on: an original story by Rutherford Montgomery
- Produced by: Winston Hibler
- Starring: Rex Allen
- Edited by: George Gale
- Music by: Buddy Baker
- Production company: Walt Disney Productions
- Distributed by: Buena Vista Distribution
- Release date: August 10, 1960
- Running time: 47 minutes
- Country: United States
- Language: English

The Hound That Thought He Was a Raccoon is a 1960 Walt Disney film directed by Tom McGowan. It was released on the same bill as Jungle Cat.

== Plot ==
Mala, a female raccoon, lives with her cubs inside an old tree in the South. During a flood caused by an intense storm, the tree collapses and Mala is able to save only one of her cubs, Weecha. Nearby, Jeff Emory, a backwoods "Mr. Fix It", owns a pack of coonhounds, and recently Lulubelle, his prime female, has had a litter of pups. Nubbin is the most active pup and frequently explores the farmyard. One day his curiosity leads him inside a butter churn that Jeff is about to return to a neighbor, and Jeff loads the churn onto his old truck and drives off with Nubbin still inside. During the trip, the churn falls off the truck, rolls down the road, over an embankment and breaks up against a tree. Nubbin emerges from the wreckage dizzy and lost, but eventually finds the hollow tree where Mala is nursing Weecha. Although hounds and raccoons are natural enemies, Mala nurses Nubbin and mothers him.

Two weeks pass and as Nubbin explores the area, he encounters Old Grouch, Weecha's father, who attacks him. Mala intervenes and fights her mate, who later leaves the area. By the time summer arrives, Nubbin and Weecha are firm friends and have several adventures together. One day while chasing a rabbit, Nubbin is threatened by a bobcat, but Mala lures the bobcat away from him and gives her life to save the dog. Now alone, Weecha and Nubbin search for food and when they come upon Jeff fishing, steal his fish. Jeff realizes that Nubbin is Lulubelle's missing pup and captures both of them, putting Weecha in an unused rabbit hutch. Jeff is surprised when Nubbin refuses to abandon his friend, and later, Weecha manipulates the latch on his cage and escapes for a nighttime romp with Nubbin, during which he wrecks Jeff's workshop. When an iron rod falls against a grinding wheel Weecha has accidentally started, sparks fly and start a fire, but Weecha races back to his cage. After Jeff is awakened by his hounds' barking and extinguishes the fire, he discovers Weecha and Nubbin sleeping innocently.

Three weeks later, Jeff begins to train Nubbin and his other young hounds to locate raccoons by following their scent. At first Jeff uses a raccoon skin as bait, but when he switches to Weecha, Nubbin refuses to work and fights off all the other dogs. Several months later, Jeff is invited on a coon hunt in a neighboring valley and leaves with his favorite hound, Rounder. Nubbin and Weecha are now full grown although Weecha is still a captive in the rabbit hutch. However, the hound helps his friend to escape and Weecha, having learned how to manipulate the latches on the hutches, releases all of Jeff's rabbits. He steps on the trigger of a shotgun and the shot alerts the hounds, who break out of their enclosure to chase the rabbits. Weecha hides inside a barrel, which the dogs roll over just as Jeff returns with Rounder. Weecha manages to escape but is pursued by Rounder. While fighting in a pond, Weecha grabs Rounder by the neck and almost drowns him, then escapes. By autumn, Weecha has completely reverted to the wild and survives by stealing duck eggs, as well as nuts and berries from pine squirrel nests.

In the spring, as Jeff and his friends begin a new hunting season with plans for a kill, Weecha finds and courts a mate, Waheena. When Weecha hears the hounds approaching, he instinctively uses a decoy trick learned from his father to draw the pack away from his mate. Nubbin is the leader of the pack, and when he corners Weecha, he recognizes his old friend and barks happily, but Nubbin's barking attracts the other dogs and he finds himself fighting his own kind in order to protect his friend. After Jeff arrives and sizes up the situation, he asks the other hunters to call off their dogs. As Weecha runs off, followed by Nubbin, Jeff explains their history. When Nubbin finds Weecha with his mate, Weecha chases him away, and Nubbin, realizing that their friendship can no longer continue, vows never to hunt Weecha again and returns to Jeff, his friend and master.

== See also ==
- List of American films of 1960
