= Rex Allen =

American film actor, singer and songwriter (1920–1999)

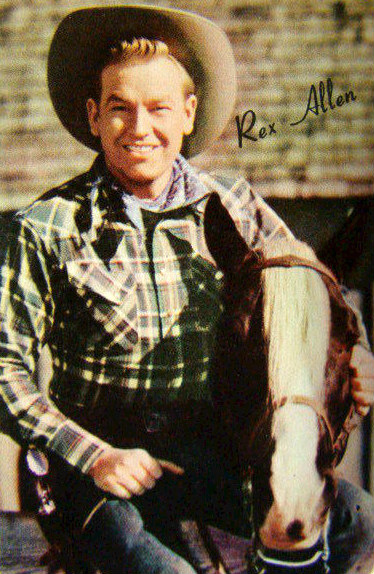
- Allen and Koko, 1952
- Born: Rex Elvie Allen; December 31, 1920; Willcox, Arizona, U.S.
- Died: December 17, 1999 (aged 78); Tucson, Arizona, U.S.
- Other names: Rex E. Allen; Rex Allen, Sr. "Cactus Rex" "The Arizona Cowboy" "The Voice of the West"
- Occupations: Actor; singer; songwriter
- Years active: 1930s–1999
- Spouses: Doris Winsor (m. 1940; div. 1945) Bonnie Linder (m. 1946; div. 1973) Virginia Hudson (m. 1992; div. 1999)
- Children: 5, including Rex Jr.

Rex Elvie Allen Sr. (December 31, 1920 – December 17, 1999), known as "The Arizona Cowboy," was an American film and television actor, singer and songwriter; he was also the narrator of many Disney nature and Western productions. For his contributions to the film industry, Allen received a motion pictures star on the Hollywood Walk of Fame in 1975, located at 6821 Hollywood Boulevard.

== Early life ==
Allen was born to Horace E. Allen and Luella Faith "Fay" Clark on a ranch in Mud Springs Canyon, forty miles from Willcox in Cochise County in southeastern Arizona, United States. As a boy he played guitar and sang at local functions with his fiddle-playing father, until high-school graduation when he toured the Southwest as a rodeo rider. He got his start in show business on the East Coast.

== Early career ==
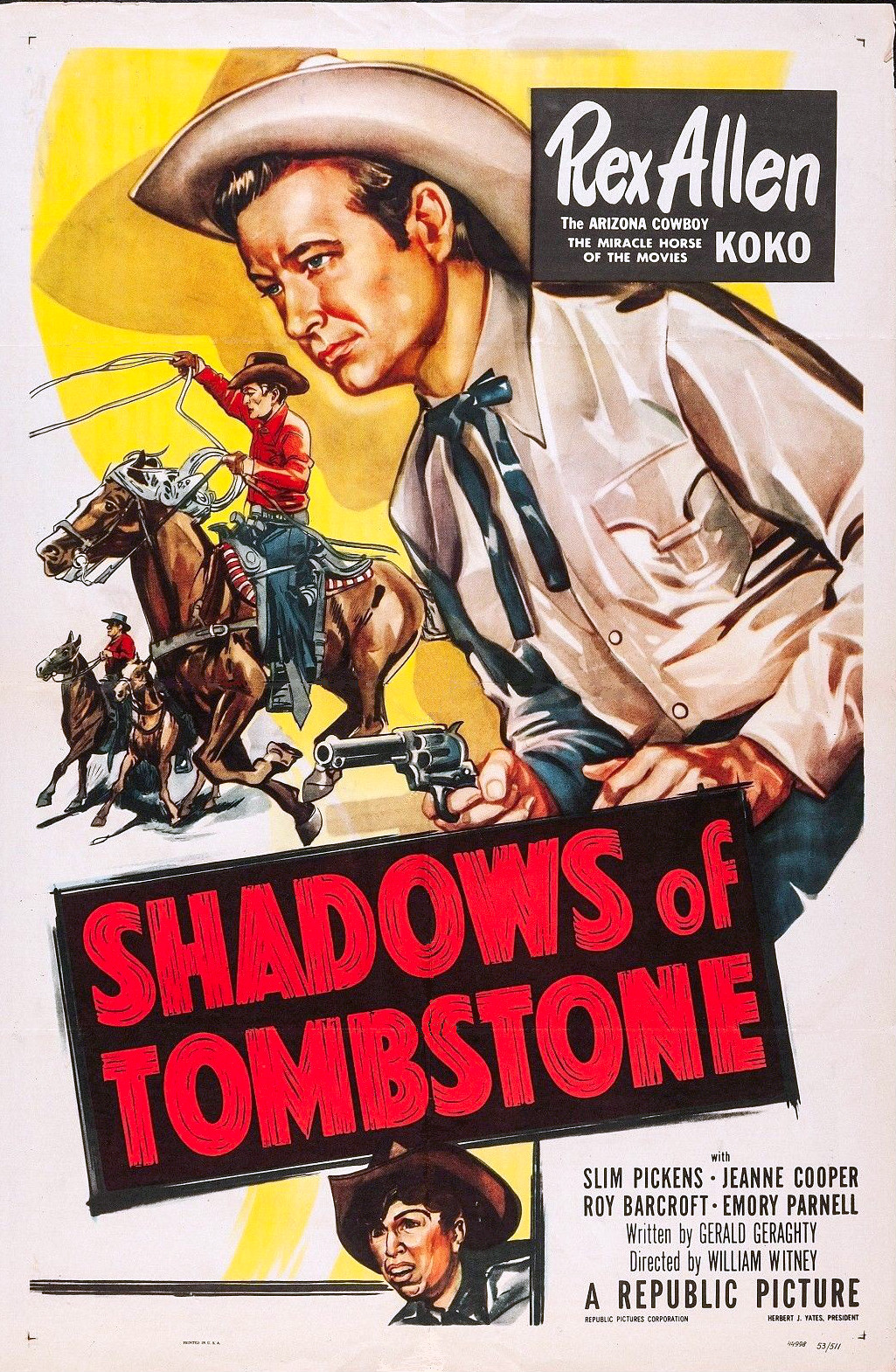
Poster for Shadows of Tombstone, 1953

Allen began his singing career on radio station KOY in Phoenix, Arizona, after which he became better known as a performer on the National Barn Dance on WLS in Chicago.

When singing cowboys such as Roy Rogers and Gene Autry were very much in vogue in American film, in 1949 Republic Pictures in Hollywood gave him a screen test and put him under contract. Beginning in 1950, Allen starred as himself in 19 of Hollywood's Western movies. One of the top-ten box office draws of the day, whose character was soon depicted in comic books, on screen Allen personified the clean cut, God-fearing American hero of the Wild West, who wore a white Stetson hat, loved his faithful horse Koko, and had a loyal buddy who shared his adventures. Allen's comic-relief sidekick in his first few pictures was first Buddy Ebsen and then character actor Slim Pickens.

== Personal life ==
In 1940, Allen married Doris Windsor, with whom he had one child (Rexine Allen). His second marriage was to Bonnie Linder (m. 1946–1973), with whom he had four children. His third and final marriage was to Virginia Hudson, on November 25, 1992. The couple divorced in 1999.

His five children included Rex Allen Jr., who became a singer like his father.

Allen was a cousin of the Gunsmoke cast members Glenn Strange (who played bartender Sam Noonan) and Taylor "Cactus Mack" McPeters (who played "Pa" in the episode "Marry Me").

== Later career ==
Allen wrote and recorded many songs, a number of which were featured in his own films. Late in coming to the industry, his film career was relatively short as the popularity of series westerns faded by the mid 1950s. But he starred in a number of B-Westerns during the 1950s.

As other cowboy stars made the transition to television, Allen tried too, cast as Dr. Bill Baxter for the half-hour weekly syndicated series Frontier Doctor. In 1961, he was one of five rotating hosts for NBC-TV's Five Star Jubilee.

Allen had a rich, pleasant voice, ideally suited for narration, and was able to find considerable work as a narrator in a variety of films, especially for Walt Disney Pictures wildlife films and television shows. The work earned him the nickname, "The Voice of the West." He narrated The Legend of Lobo, The Incredible Journey, Yellowstone Cubs, Run, Appaloosa, Run, and Charlie, the Lonesome Cougar. He also was the voice of the father on Walt Disney's Carousel of Progress, first presented at the 1964 World's Fair and now at Walt Disney World. A 1993 renovation replaced Allen with Jean Shepherd as the voice of the father, but Allen was given a cameo as the grandfather in the final scene.

Allen provided the narration for the 1973 Hanna-Barbera animated film Charlotte's Web. He was also the voice behind Purina Dog Chow commercials for many years. After moving to Sonoita, Arizona, in the early 1990s, he was a viable voice talent almost until his death, recording hundreds of national advertising voice tracks at his favorite Tucson studio, Porter Sound. In his later years he also performed frequently with actor Pedro Gonzalez-Gonzalez. He wrote and sang the theme song for the early 1980s sitcom Best of the West.

== Death ==
Allen died on December 17, 1999, in Tucson, Arizona. He had collapsed in his driveway after suffering a heart attack and was then accidentally run over by his caregiver. He was cremated and his ashes were scattered at Railroad Park in Willcox.

== Legacy ==
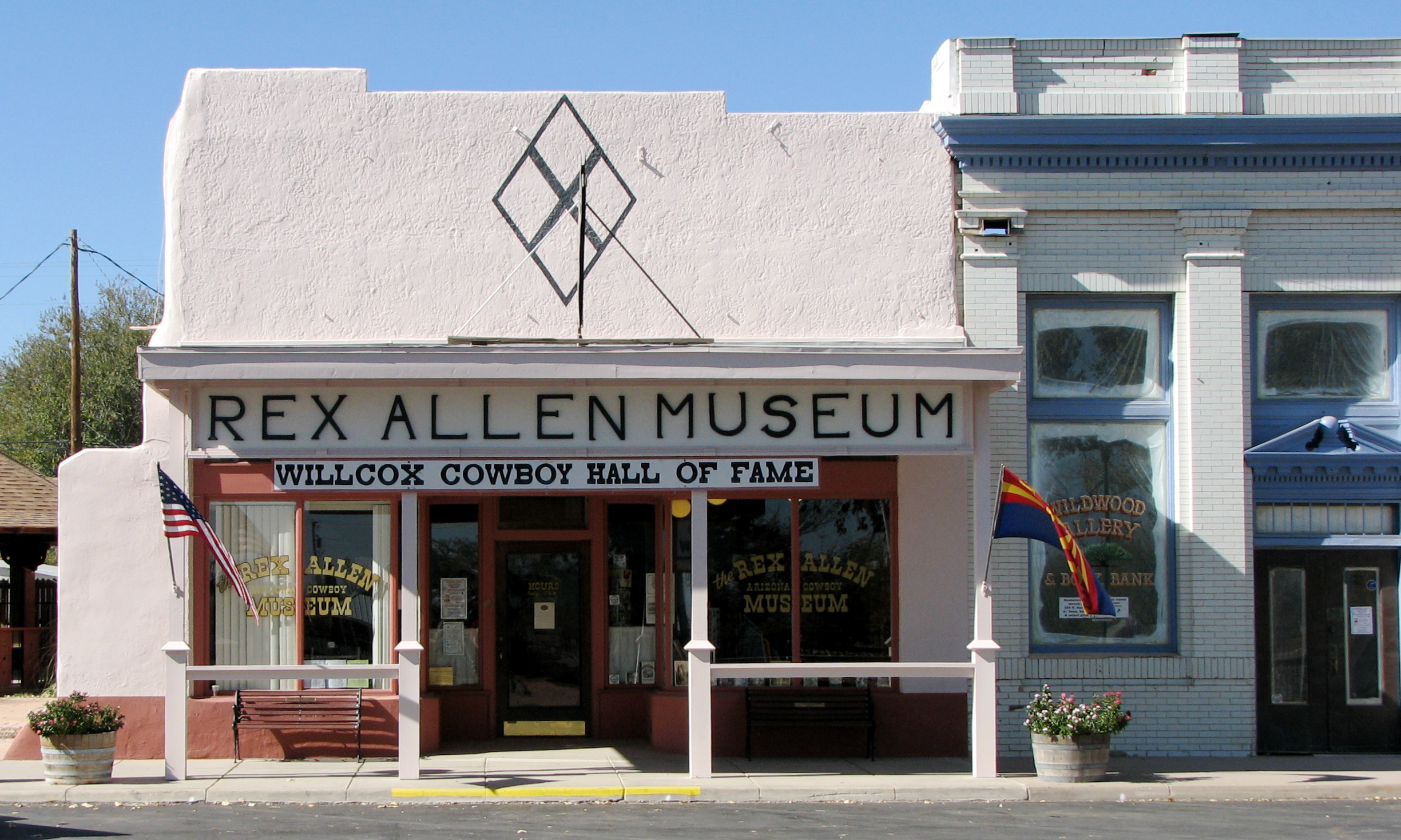
Rex Allen Museum in Willcox

For his contribution to the motion picture industry, Allen was given a star on the Hollywood Walk of Fame at 6821 Hollywood Boulevard.

In 1983, he was inducted into the Western Performers Hall of Fame at the National Cowboy and Western Heritage Museum in Oklahoma City, Oklahoma.

In 1989, his life story was told in the book Rex Allen: My Life, Sunrise to Sunset – The Arizona Cowboy, written by Paula Simpson-Witt and Snuff Garrett.

The Rex Allen Arizona Cowboy Museum and Willcox Cowboy Hall of Fame in Willcox features Allen's collection of memorabilia, including photos, movie posters, cowboy outfits, records and musical instruments. His cremated ashes were scattered in Railroad Park, across the street from the museum, near a bronze statue of Allen.

== Discography ==
=== Albums ===
Year	Album	US Country	Label
1956	Under Western Skies	—	Decca
1958	Mister Cowboy	—	Decca
1960	Rex Allen Sings	—	Hacienda
1961	Say One for Me	—	Buena Vista
1962	16 Golden Hits	—	Buena Vista
1962	Faith of a Man	—	Mercury
1962	Sings and Tells Tales of the Golden West	—	Mercury
1964	Western Ballads	—	Hilltop
1968	The Smooth Country Sound of Rex Allen	42	Decca
1970	Touch of God's Hands	—	Decca
1973	Boney Kneed Hairy Legged Cowboy Song	—	JMI
1980	Love Gone Cold	—	Longhorn

=== Singles ===
Year	Single	Chart Positions		Album
Year	Single	US Country	US	Album
1949	"Afraid"	14	—	singles only
1951	"The Roving Kind"	–	20	singles only
1951	"Sparrow in the Treetop"	10	28	singles only
1953	"Crying in the Chapel"	4	8	singles only
1961	"Marines, Let's Go"	21	—	singles only
1962	"Don't Go Near the Indians"	4	17	Sings and Tells Tales of the Golden West
1964	"Tear After Tear"	44	—	single only
1968	"Tiny Bubbles"	71	—	The Smooth Country Sound of Rex Allen

== Partial filmography ==
- The Arizona Cowboy (1950) as himself
- Hills of Oklahoma (1950) as himself
- Redwood Forest Trail (1950) as himself
- Under Mexicali Stars (1950) as himself aka Mike Jordan
- Trail of Robin Hood (1950) as himself
- Silver City Bonanza (1951) as himself
- Thunder in God's Country (1951) as himself
- Rodeo King and the Senorita (1951) as himself
- Utah Wagon Train (1951) as himself
- Colorado Sundown (1952) as himself
- The Last Musketeer (1952) as himself
- Border Saddlemates (1952) as himself
- I Dream of Jeanie (1952) as Mr. Tambo
- Old Oklahoma Plains (1952) as himself
- South Pacific Trail (1952) as himself
- Old Overland Trail (1953) as himself
- Iron Mountain Trail (1953) as himself
- Sweethearts on Parade (1953) as Jim Riley (singing voice, uncredited)
- Down Laredo Way (1953) as himself
- Shadows of Tombstone (1953) as himself
- Red River Shore (1953) as himself
- Phantom Stallion (1954) as himself
- The Wetback Hound (1957, Short) as narrator (voice)
- The Hound That Thought He Was a Raccoon (1960) as narrator (voice)
- For the Love of Mike (1960) as himself
- Tomboy and the Champ (1961) as himself
- The Legend of Lobo (1962) as narrator
- The Saga of Windwagon Smith (1961) as narrator (voice)
- Yellowstone Cubs (1963) as narrator (voice)
- The Incredible Journey (1963) as narrator (voice)
- Swamp Country (1965) as Sheriff Jim Turner
- Run, Appaloosa, Run (1966) as narrator
- Charlie, the Lonesome Cougar (1967) as narrator
- Last of the Log Drives, 1970 (1970) as narrator
- The Virginian (TV series) (1971) season 9 episode 20 (Tate: Ramrod) : as Square Dance Caller
- Charlotte's Web (1973) as narrator (voice)
- Starbird and Sweet William (1973) as narrator (voice)
- Vanishing Wilderness (1974, Documentary) as narrator
- The Secret of Navajo Cave (1976) as narrator

== See also ==
- List of actors with Hollywood Walk of Fame motion picture stars

== Bibliography ==
- Green, D.B. (1998). "Rex Allen." In The Encyclopedia of Country Music. P. Kingsbury, Ed. New York: Oxford University Press. p. 10. ISBN 978-0195395631
