= Charlie, the Lonesome Cougar =

1967 film by Winston Hibler

- Theatrical release poster
- Directed by: Winston Hibler
- Written by: Jack Speirs
- Story by: Winston Hibler
- Produced by: Walt Disney; Winston Hibler; Charles L. Draper
- Starring: Ron Brown; Brian Russell; Linda Wallace; Jim Wilson; Clifford Peterson
- Narrated by: Rex Allen
- Cinematography: William Bacon III; Lloyd Beebe
- Edited by: Gregg McLaughlin
- Music by: Franklyn Marks; Speirs Marks
- Production company: Walt Disney Productions
- Distributed by: Buena Vista Distribution
- Release date: October 18, 1967; (with The Jungle Book)
- Running time: 75 minutes
- Country: United States
- Language: English

Charlie, the Lonesome Cougar is a 1967 American adventure drama film produced by Walt Disney Productions and directed by Winston Hibler. Originally released on October 18, 1967 as part of a double bill with The Jungle Book, it was filmed partially at the Weyerhauser Mill in Enumclaw, Washington and partially on the North Fork of the Clearwater River in North Central Idaho, recording one of the last river log drives to occur in the United States. Four cougars were used in the film.

== Plot ==
The film takes place in the Cascade Mountains of Washington (despite much of the filming having been done in North Central Idaho).

Charlie the cougar's mother lost her life when he was a cub, leaving him alone. Jess Bradley finds Charlie, takes him in and raises him. Charlie experiences some adventures growing up including some play time with a black bear cub and visits to his friend Potlatch for snacks. Potlatch has a Smooth Fox Terrier named Chainsaw, Charlie's nemesis, in the logging camp where Charlie grows up. This rivalry leads to problems, including a wrecked kitchen and a trip down the river as part of the logging crew. This leads to more problems including another destroyed kitchen. This costs the lumberjack company a great deal of money, Charlie is let go and tied up, until he hears and sees some of the employees involved with a log standing contest. Charlie enters the contest but when Chainsaw distracts him, Charlie loses his concentration and fall off the log into the water. The contest ends when the boss forces the other employees back to work. Jess is forced to have to leave Charlie at home in cage

Jess, in the meantime, has found himself a girlfriend and gets engaged. Charlie hears a call from a female cougar in the distance one night and he decides to break free to investigate. The two had a good time together, but it quickly turns sour when his new friend wouldn't share a meal she had recently caught. Charlie then moves on and finds himself a free meal from a farmer milking his cows. This does not turn out well for Charlie and havoc ensues on the farm.

Charlie finds himself lost and on his own. He spends the summer hunting and getting by until one day when he becomes hunted by a pack of dogs. He manages to escape by going on a log down a flume, until he hits some bushes in the way, causing him to get off the flume, and eventually finds himself back at the logging camp. However, after spending the summer in the wild, his natural instincts have kicked in and he's more wild than tame now. When Chainsaw discovers Charlie, Charlie runs and gets trapped in a lift on the ground. The bosses men are about to shoot Charlie, until Jess comes to the rescue. He rescues Charlie from the lift. Ultimately, Jess has no option but to release him back into the wild, but in a nature preserve, where the cougars and other wild animals are protected from hunters, dogs, and other predators. There he finds the same female cougar, and lives happily ever after.

== Cast ==
- Ron Brown as Jess Bradley
- Brian Russell as Potlatch
- Chainsaw as himself
- Linda Wallace as Jess's Fiancee (Unspoken)
- Jim Wilson as Farmer
- Lewis Sample as Chief Engineer
- Clifford Peterson as Mill Manager
- Edward C. Moller as Mill Hand
- Rex Allen as narrator (voice)

== See also ==
- List of American films of 1967
