= The Beautiful Cheat =

The Beautiful Cheat may refer to:

- The Beautiful Cheat (1926 film), an American silent comedy film
- What a Woman!, also known as The Beautiful Cheat, a 1943 romantic comedy film
- The Beautiful Cheat (1945 film), an American comedy film
