= The Broadway Boob =

1926 film

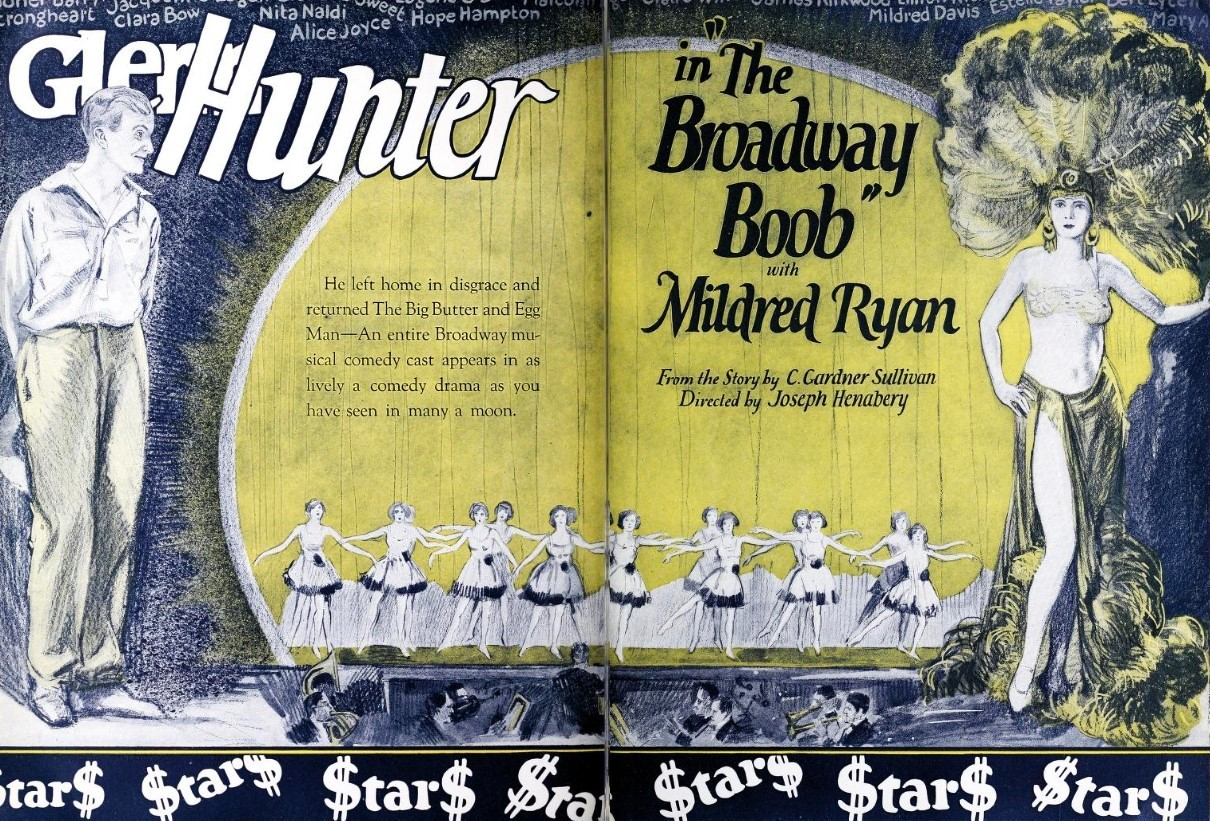
- Trade advertisement
- Directed by: Joseph Henabery
- Written by: Monte M. Katterjohn
- Produced by: Oscar Price
- Starring: Glenn Hunter; Mildred Ryan; Antrim Short
- Cinematography: Marcel Le Picard
- Production company: Oscar Price Productions
- Distributed by: Associated Exhibitors
- Release date: February 10, 1926
- Running time: 60 minutes
- Country: United States
- Language: Silent (English intertitles)

The Broadway Boob is a 1926 American silent comedy film directed by Joseph Henabery and starring Glenn Hunter, Mildred Ryan, and Antrim Short.

== Plot ==
As described in a film magazine review, Dan Williams, a burlesque dancer from a small town, lands a minor part in a Broadway musical comedy. The press agent for the play puts out some ballyhoo publicity asserting that Dan is drawing down $3000 a week. His mother back home, based on the story, assures the banker father that Dan will come to the rescue when a run on the town bank is threatened. Dan hears of his father's financial embarrassment and, with the aid of the press agent, comes up with a scheme to stop the run on the bank. He shows up in the town in a Rolls-Royce car with two satchels under heavy guard. With the bank run ended, his father is surprised when the satchels are found to contain not money but some stones. He wins the affections of his hometown sweetheart.

== Cast ==
- Glenn Hunter as Dan Williams
- Mildred Ryan as Mary Abbott
- Antrim Short as Jack Briggs
- Beryl Halley as Queenie Martine
- Margaret Irving as Mabel Golden
- Gitana Kamp as Ritzi Scheff
- William T. Hayes as Hiram Williams
- William Black as Theophilus Barrett
- Marion Stevenson as Mrs. Williams

== Bibliography ==
- Munden, Kenneth White. The American Film Institute Catalog of Motion Pictures Produced in the United States, Part 1. University of California Press, 1997. ISBN 978-0-520-20970-1.
