= George D. Hay =

American journalist (1895–1968)

George Dewey Hay
- Born: George Dewey Hay; November 9, 1895; Attica, Indiana, U.S.
- Died: May 8, 1968 (aged 72); Virginia Beach, Virginia, U.S.
- Other names: The Solemn Old Judge
- Occupations: Radio Personality/announcer/newspaper reporter and writer
- Known for: Grand Ole Opry founder and member

George Dewey Hay (November 9, 1895 – May 8, 1968) was an American radio announcer and journalist. He was the founder of the original radio series Grand Ole Opry on WSM-AM in Nashville, Tennessee, from which the country music stage show of the same name developed.

== Early newspaper and radio career ==
Hay was born in Attica, Indiana, United States. In Memphis, Tennessee, after World War I, he was a reporter for the newspaper The Commercial Appeal. While performing a reporting assignment in Mammoth Spring, Arkansas in 1919, Hay was invited to a hoedown in a local cabin. There, a fiddle player, a guitar player, and a banjo player performed until dawn. Hay was impressed, and that may have inspired his later efforts. When the newspaper initiated its own radio station, WMC, in January 1923, he became a late-night announcer for the station. His popularity increased and in May 1924 he quit for WLS in Chicago, where he served as the announcer for a program that became National Barn Dance.

== Beginning The Grand Ole Opry ==
On November 9, 1925, Hay's 30th birthday, he relocated to Nashville and began work for station WSM. Getting a strong listener reaction to 78-year-old fiddler Uncle Jimmy Thompson that November, Hay announced the next month that WSM would feature "an hour or two" of old-time music every Saturday night. He promoted the music and formed a booking agency.

The show was originally named WSM Barn Dance, and Hay billed himself as "The Solemn Old Judge", though he was only 30 years old and not a judge The Barn Dance was broadcast after NBC's program Music Appreciation Hour, featuring classical music and grand opera. One day in December 1927, the final music piece on the Music Appreciation Hour included the sound of a rushing locomotive. After the show ended, "Judge Hay" began WSM Barn Dance with this announcement:

Friends, the program which just came to a close was devoted to the classics. Doctor Damrosch [host of the program] told us that there is no place in the classics for realism. However, from here on out for the next three hours, we will present nothing but realism. It will be down to earth for the 'earthy'.

Hay then introduced a man he dubbed "The Harmonica Wizard," DeFord Bailey, who played his classic train song, "The Pan American Blues," named for the Louisville and Nashville Railroad passenger train The Pan-American. After Bailey's performance, Hay commented, "For the past hour, we have been listening to music taken largely from Grand Opera. From now on we will present the Grand Ole Opry."

== Newspaper, announcing, touring and film appearance ==
During the 1930s, he was involved with Rural Radio, one of the first magazines about country music, and working on the movie Grand Ole Opry (1940). He was an announcer with the radio series during the 1940s and toured with Opry acts, including the September 1947 Opry show at Carnegie Hall. He was featured in Hoosier Holiday, a 1945 movie from Republic Pictures, in a cast that also included Dale Evans.

== Publication and legacy ==
In 1945, Hay wrote A Story of the Grand Ole Opry, and he became an editor of Nashville's Pickin’ and Singin’ News in 1953. He was inducted into the Country Music Hall of Fame in 1966.

== Death ==
Hay relocated to Virginia Beach, Virginia, where he died in 1968. He was interred at Forest Lawn Cemetery on 8100 Granby Street, Norfolk, Virginia 23505.
