= Hot Rhythm =

1944 film by William Beaudine

- Directed by: William Beaudine
- Written by: Tim Ryan; Charles R. Marion
- Produced by: Lindsley Parsons; Trem Carr
- Starring: Robert Lowery; Dona Drake; Tim Ryan
- Cinematography: Ira H. Morgan
- Edited by: Richard C. Currier
- Music by: Edward J. Kay
- Production company: Monogram Pictures
- Distributed by: Monogram Pictures
- Release date: April 13, 1944
- Running time: 79 minutes
- Country: United States
- Language: English

Hot Rhythm is a 1944 American musical comedy film directed by William Beaudine and starring Robert Lowery, Dona Drake, and the radio and vaudeville team of Tim and Irene (Tim Ryan and Irene Ryan).

== Plot ==
J. P. O'Hara owns the Beacon Recording Company, with studio and distribution facilities. His biggest attraction is singer-bandleader Tommy Taylor, who is managed by "Honest Herman" Strohbach. Two staff members, Jimmy and Sammy, are aspiring songwriters who make their living writing radio jingles. They meet singer Mary Adams, and Jimmy is so taken with her that he resolves to advance her career by any means possible. He records Mary singing along to an instrumental played by Taylor's orchestra, hoping to interest O'Hara in Mary. When Mary's demonstration record is released to the public accidentally, Taylor's manager threatens to sue O'Hara. O'Hara goes around town buying back copies of Mary's record and smashing them in the stores, which lands him in jail. Confusing matters further is O'Hara's new secretary, Polly Kane, who makes her own recording and is thus mistaken for mystery vocalist Mary. Mary's stormy romance with Jimmy is finally smoothed over when Jimmy tells O'Hara the truth about his finagling to promote Mary. Mary joins Tommy Taylor's band as his new singing star.

== Cast ==
- Robert Lowery as Jimmy O'Brien
- Dona Drake as Mary Adams
- Tim Ryan as J. P. O'Hara
- Irene Ryan as Polly Kane
- Sidney Miller as Sammy Rubin
- Jerry Cooper as Tommy Taylor
- Harry Langdon as Mr. Whiffle
- Robert Kent as Herman Strohbach
- Lloyd Ingraham as Brown
- Cyril Ring as Jackson, record-shop proprietor
- Joan Curtis as Alice Jones
- Paul Porcasi as Mr. Peroni, cafe owner

== Production ==
Monogram was a "budget" studio that made feature films for a fraction of what the big studios spent. Its hourlong Charlie Chan mysteries of the 1940s typically cost about $90,000 each, compared to the Twentieth Century-Fox Chan films of the 1930s, which cost between $200,000 and $300,000 each. Monogram's Chan films were instrumental in getting other Monogram features shown in more theaters, resulting in a period of ambitious expansion for the studio. Hot Rhythm was Monogram's biggest production of 1944, with an unusually long running time of 79 minutes, and with the studio's top cameraman Ira H. Morgan and director William Beaudine joining forces to make the economically staged scenes look more elaborate.

== Bibliography ==
- Michael L. Stephens. Art Directors in Cinema: A Worldwide Biographical Dictionary. McFarland, 1998.
