= The Girl from Jones Beach =

1949 film by Peter Godfrey

- Theatrical release poster
- Directed by: Peter Godfrey
- Screenplay by: I. A. L. Diamond
- Story by: Allen Boretz
- Produced by: Alex Gottlieb
- Starring: Ronald Reagan; Virginia Mayo; Eddie Bracken; Dona Drake; Henry Travers; Lois Wilson
- Cinematography: Carl Guthrie
- Edited by: Rudi Fehr
- Music by: David Buttolph
- Production company: Warner Bros. Pictures
- Distributed by: Warner Bros. Pictures
- Release date: July 16, 1949
- Running time: 78 minutes
- Country: United States
- Language: English
- Box office: $1.6 million

The Girl from Jones Beach is a 1949 American comedy film directed by Peter Godfrey and written by I. A. L. Diamond. It stars Ronald Reagan, Virginia Mayo, Eddie Bracken, Dona Drake, Henry Travers and Lois Wilson. The film was released by Warner Bros. Pictures on July 16, 1949.

== Plot ==
Chuck Donovan is a not so successful agent in New York who is hired by some television producers for a special job. He is to find the real identity of the woman who modeled for commercial sketch artist Bob Randolph as he created the famous "Randolph Girl". No one besides Randolph, not even the artist's secretary, Miss Brooks, has ever met the woman.

Desperately, Donovan works to get Randolph to disclose the woman's identity, but the artist refuses. While Donovan is at Bob's studio, a suspicious invoice for the purchase of twelve identical golden bracelets arrive. And things become even more odd when a girl, who admittedly doesn't look like the Randolph girl, comes to the studio to pose. After Donovan puts pressure on him, Randolph confesses that the Randolph Girl is not an individual but a composite, drawn from the body parts of 12 different models.

Realizing that he is about to fail in his mission of producing the model, Donovan considers taking his own life. He has tried to do this several times before, and each time left a note to his girlfriend, photographer Connie Martin. When Donovan goes to Jones Beach to drown himself, he notices a swimsuit-clad woman who is the spitting image of the Randolph Girl. Before he has a chance to contact her, she disappears into a dressing room, and he doesn't recognize her amid all the women coming out. He takes a chance on a girl named Ruth Wilson, and follows her to her home. He learns that Ruth is a language teacher for immigrants, living with her mother and brother. Ruth dresses modestly so as not to not attract too much attention to her body, since she wants men to like her for her mind.

To get closer to Ruth, Donovan persuades Randolph to pretend to be a Czech immigrant, Robert Benerik, and signs him up for her class. Under his phony identity, and with a fake European accent, Randolph tries to win Ruth over by showing interest in her mind. For her part, the normally straitlaced Ruth finds herself attracted to the handsome newcomer. Soon they form a genuine affection for each other.

Due to Donovan's accidental revelation to one of the 12 models that she isn't the only participant, all the models decide to leave. Additionally, Randolph's real identity is exposed to Ruth, prompting him to admit that he joined the class under false pretenses.

Bob and Ruth meet at the beach one day, and Donovan has sent Connie to take a secret photo of Ruth for commercial purposes. They succeed and the picture is published in the papers. Because of this, Ruth is fired from her teaching job, and the headmaster, Emma Shoemaker, claims that it is indecent behavior. Ruth fights the headmaster's decision in court, using Randolph as a witness on her behalf. After Ruth has appeared in court in her bathing suit, she wins the claim and gets her job back. The story ends with plans for a double wedding, with Donovan to marry Connie, and Randolph to marry Ruth.

== Cast ==
- Ronald Reagan as Bob Randolph / Robert Benerik
- Virginia Mayo as Ruth Wilson
- Eddie Bracken as Chuck Donovan
- Dona Drake as Connie Martin
- Henry Travers as Judge Bullfinch (in his final film role)
- Lois Wilson as Mrs. Wilson
- Florence Bates as Miss Emma Shoemaker
- Jerome Cowan as Mr. Graves - Ruth's Attorney
- Helen Westcott as Miss Brooks
- Paul Harvey as Jim Townsend
- Lloyd Corrigan as Mr. Evergood
- Gary Gray as Woody Wilson
- Myrna Dell as Lorraine Scott
- Joan Vohs as model (uncredited)

== Critical reception ==
In a contemporary review of the film in The New York Times, critic Bosley Crowther wrote that "Virginia Mayo upholds the case for the form-fit bathing suit" and "many thanks to the Warners for not putting too much in the way of Miss Mayo's able demonstration of the use of the bathing suit." About Reagan's performance, Crowther noted that he "is a fellow who has a cheerful way of looking at dames" and that he "is thoroughly capable of getting the most that's to be had out of the major comedy encounters that develop in this film." After reporting that "I. A. L. Diamond's script is not of a lofty order. Indeed, it is noticeably low," he concluded with, "As a comedy actress, Miss Mayo is no better than a rather weak script. But as a model for bathing apparel—well, do you or do you not like bathing suits?"
