= O, My Darling Clementine =

1943 film by Frank McDonald

- Theatrical release poster
- Directed by: Frank McDonald
- Screenplay by: Dorrell McGowan; Stuart E. McGowan
- Produced by: Armand Schaefer
- Starring: Roy Acuff; Isabel Randolph; Harry Cheshire; Frank Albertson; Lorna Gray; Irene Ryan
- Cinematography: Bud Thackery
- Edited by: Arthur Roberts
- Music by: Marlin Skiles
- Production company: Republic Pictures
- Distributed by: Republic Pictures
- Release date: December 31, 1943
- Running time: 68 minutes
- Country: United States
- Language: English

O, My Darling Clementine is a 1943 American musical film directed by Frank McDonald and written by Dorrell McGowan and Stuart E. McGowan. The film stars Roy Acuff, Isabel Randolph, Harry Cheshire, Frank Albertson, Lorna Gray, and Irene Ryan. The film released on December 31, 1943, by Republic Pictures.

== Plot ==
“Dapper” Dan Franklin, the manager of a traveling theater group, becomes stranded in the small town of Harmony, Tennessee, where strict Blue Laws prohibit public performances. The town is tightly controlled by a conservative city council, heavily influenced by their strong-willed wives—especially the formidable Abigail Uppington.

Dan, who quickly falls for the mayor’s daughter, Clementine, decides to stay in Harmony. To avoid being forced out, he buys what he believes is a worthless piece of land behind City Hall. However, due to a paperwork error, he accidentally becomes the legal owner of City Hall itself.

With the support of the kind-hearted Mayor “Pappy” Cheshire, Dan organizes a local talent show to demonstrate the value of the arts to the town. When the city council attempts to buy back the land, Dan strikes a deal: he will return City Hall if they agree to lift the performance ban for 30 days—and if the council members themselves participate in the show. The talent show goes on, with Clementine in the spotlight, and even the most skeptical townspeople begin to appreciate the magic of performance. In the end, the town of Harmony undergoes a heartfelt transformation, embracing the joy of theater.

== Cast ==
- Roy Acuff as Sheriff Roy Acuff
- Isabel Randolph as Abigail Uppington
- Harry Cheshire as 'Pappy' Cheshire
- Frank Albertson as 'Dapper' Dan Franklin
- Lorna Gray as Clementine Cheshire
- Irene Ryan as Irene
- Eddie Parks as Luke Scully
- Loie Bridge as Ellie Scully
- Patricia Knox as Bubbles
- Tom Kennedy as Bill Collector
- Edwin Stanley as Hartfield
- Emmett Vogan as Brown
