= Chicken Wagon Family =

1939 film by Herbert I. Leeds

- Directed by: Herbert I. Leeds
- Written by: Viola Brothers Shore
- Based on: The novel The Chicken-Wagon Family by Barry Benefield
- Produced by: Sol M. Wurtzel
- Starring: Jane Withers; Leo Carrillo; Marjorie Weaver; Spring Byington; Kane Richmond
- Cinematography: Edward Cronjager
- Edited by: Fred Allen
- Music by: Samuel Kaylin
- Distributed by: 20th Century Fox
- Release date: August 11, 1939
- Running time: 63 minutes
- Country: United States
- Language: English

Chicken Wagon Family is a 1939 American comedy, directed by Herbert I. Leeds and based on the 1925 novel, The Chicken-Wagon Family, by Barry Benefield. It stars Leo Carrillo in the role originally intended for Will Rogers before his death.

== Plot ==
Jean Paul Batiste Fippany (Leo Carrillo) and his family live a vagabond lifestyle with no home but their traveling wagon. Cecile Fippany (Majorie Weaver), Jean Paul's wife, has been secretly saving money to move into a home. When Jean Paul finds the money, his gambling addiction takes over and he loses the entire savings. Youngest daughter Addie (Jane Withers) catches the attention of policeman Matt Hibbard (Kane Richmond) when she leaves her coat in exchange for coffee and doughnuts. Taking pity on the homeless family, Hibbard shelters them in an abandoned fire station. Addie and her father begin selling bathtubs for a big profit, which earns them enough money to purchase the fire station building.

== Cast ==
- Leo Carrillo – Jean Paul Batiste Fippany
- Jane Withers – Addie Fippany
- Marjorie Weaver – Cecile Fippany
- Spring Byington – Josephine Fippany
- Hobart Cavanaugh – Henri Fippany
- Kane Richmond – Matt Hibbard
- Adrian Morris – Tough Guy
