= Teleview =

System for projecting stereoscopic motion pictures

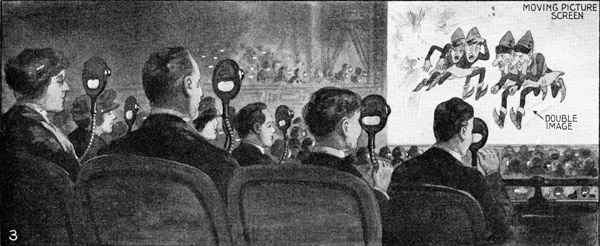
An illustration from a 1922 article about Teleview

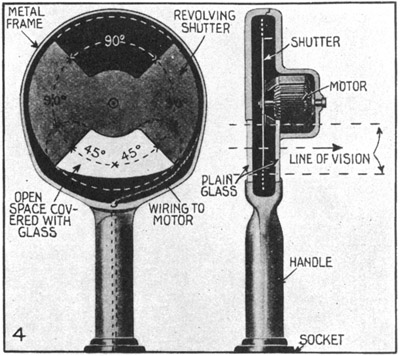
Details of the Teleview viewer

Teleview was a system for projecting stereoscopic motion pictures invented by Laurens Hammond, best known as the inventor of the Hammond organ. It made its public debut on 27 December 1922 at the Selwyn Theatre in New York City, the only theater ever equipped with the system. The program included several short films, a live presentation of projected 3D shadows, and the 95-minute feature film M.A.R.S. (or The Man From M.A.R.S.), later re-released in 2D as Radio-Mania.

Teleview pioneered the alternate-frame sequencing method of stereoscopic 3D projection. The basic principle had been patented as early as 1897, but the improved Teleview implementation was the first to be presented to the public.

Left-eye and right-eye films were run through a pair of interlocked projectors with their shutters operating out of phase. Each shutter was three-bladed, so that each pair of film frames was projected three times (i.e., left-right-left-right-left-right) before the mechanisms moved the next pair of frames into position. At the minimum 16-frames-per-second silent film projection speed, this resulted in a minimum of 48 flashes per second per eye, eliminating the severe flicker that fatally flawed earlier systems in which the left-eye and right-eye frames alternated on a single strip of film projected at twice the normal rate.

Each theater seat was equipped with an attached viewing device supported by a gooseneck stand. It contained a rotary shutter synchronized with the projector shutters, so that each of the user's eyes saw only the images intended for it. Persistence of vision made both views appear to be uninterrupted and a normal fully stereoscopic image was seen.

Hammond's system won praise, but because of the high cost of installing the equipment, and the inconvenience of having to peer through the unwieldy viewer, it disappeared completely after this lone engagement ended in early 1923.

The alternating image method enjoyed a revival after the advent of optoelectronic shutters in the 1970s made it more practical. Modern LC shutter glasses are used for viewing projected 3D films in some theaters, as well as 3DTV video and stereoscopic computer graphics.

== See also ==
- List of 3D films
