= The Man from M.A.R.S. (1922 film) =

1922 film

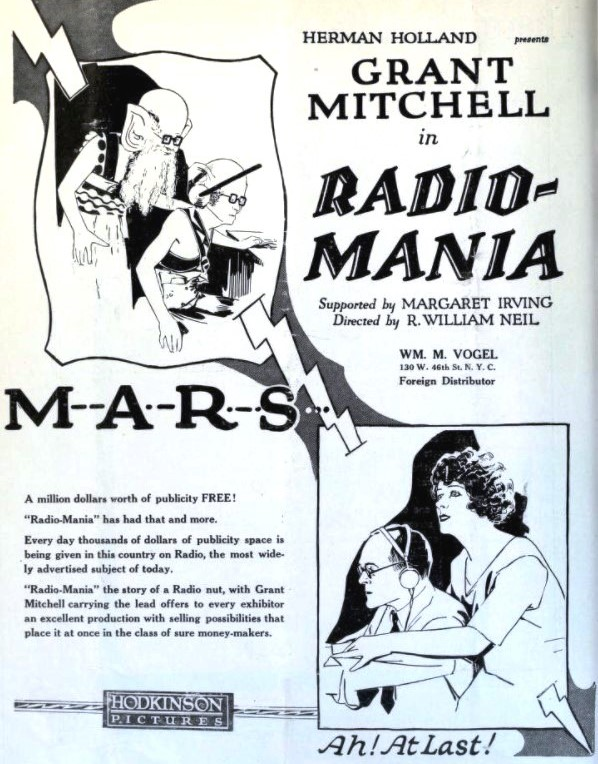
- Advertisement for Radio-mania
- Directed by: Roy William Neill
- Written by: Lewis Allen Browne
- Starring: Grant Mitchell; Margaret Irving
- Cinematography: George J. Folsey
- Production company: Herman Holland Productions
- Distributed by: W. W. Hodkinson Corporation
- Release date: December 22, 1922
- Running time: 95 minutes
- Country: United States

The Man from M.A.R.S. is a 1922 silent U.S. science fiction film. It is notable for using the 3-D process called Teleview, similar to today's alternating frame 3-D systems. Shown in 3-D only at the Selwyn Theater in New York City, it was previewed as Mars Calling at a trade and press screening on October 13, 1922, premiered as M.A.R.S. on December 27, 1922, and ran through January 20, 1923. A 2-D version was distributed as Radio-Mania in 1923–1924. The film was directed by Roy William Neil and photographed by George J. Folsey.

== Plot ==
This curious picture is a cross between fantasy and science fiction (at least, the 1922 version of science fiction) and features Broadway actors Grant Mitchell and Margaret Irving in their motion picture debuts. Arthur Wyman (Mitchell) is the typical absent-minded scientist. He is in love with Mary Langdon (Irving), the daughter of his landlady (Gertrude Hillman). To help her out, he invents an alarm clock that does not tick (this being long before the days of electronic devices). Using the money he has earned writing an article, Wyman tries to put the finishing touches on a radio that will contact Mars. He falls asleep as he is tinkering with it and dreams that he has gotten in touch with the Martians. They give him a lot of valuable information—he learns a special way to make diamonds from coal, fashion gold from clay, and create steel that weighs "less than nothing." What he learns makes him fabulously wealthy—until, much to his disappointment, he wakes up. But then Mary arrives and tells him that the rights to the "tickless" alarm clock have been sold for a lot of money, so things work out after all.

== Cast ==
- Grant Mitchell as Arthur Wyman
- Margaret Irving as Mary Langdon
- Gertrude Hillman as Mrs. Langdon
- W.H. Burton as Mr. Sterling
- Isabel Vernon as Landlady (credited as Isabelle Vernon)
- John D. Walsh as Buz Buz (credited as J.D. Walsh)
- J. Burke as Gin Gin
- Peggy Smith as Pux Pux
- Betty Borders as Tuz Tuz
- Alice Effinger as Martian Flapper
- Peggy Williams as Martian Flapper

== Teleview ==
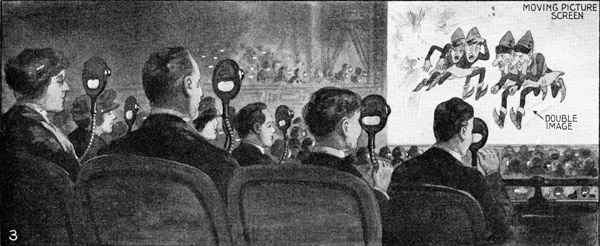
An illustration from a 1922 article about Teleview

Teleview was used for showing The Man from M.A.R.S. at the Sewlyn Theatre in New York City and then was never seen again. It was invented by Laurens Hammond, best known as the creator of the Hammond organ. Hammond had, in fact, earned money from the invention of a silent clock, which enabled him to establish himself as an inventor. Teleview was very complex for its time as it was a way to project and view stereoscopic images by the alternating frame method. Two projectors ran interlocked, with the left and right images being projected one after the other in repeated rapid succession. Each spectator had a special viewer attached to the arm rest of their chair. A revolving shutter in the viewer ran in synchronization with the projector shutters, blocking each eye's view of the images intended for the other eye, so that the users simply positioned the viewers in front of their eyes and looked through to see a stereoscopic 3-D image. Unlike earlier inventions based on the same principle, the Teleview system did not cause any unusual image flickering. The show was a success, but after several weeks at this one theater Teleview vanished without a trace.

== Preservation ==
A print of Radio-Mania is held by the BFI National Archive. In 2022, a surviving 2D copy of the film was converted to 3D and released to Blu-ray by Variety Films as part of the documentary 100 Years of 3D Movies featuring: The Man from M.A.R.S. along with related bonus material. A 2D version of this program later launched on streaming platforms.
