= Valiant Is the Word for Carrie =

1936 film directed by Wesley Ruggles

- Title card at the beginning of the film
- Directed by: Wesley Ruggles
- Written by: Claude Binyon
- Based on: Valiant Is the Word for Carrie by Barry Benefield
- Produced by: Adolph Zukor
- Starring: Gladys George; Arline Judge; John Howard; Dudley Digges; Harry Carey; Isabel Jewell
- Cinematography: Leo Tover
- Edited by: Otho Lovering
- Music by: Friedrich Hollaender
- Distributed by: Paramount Pictures
- Release date: October 2, 1936
- Running time: 110 minutes
- Country: United States
- Language: English

Valiant Is the Word for Carrie is a 1936 American drama film directed by Wesley Ruggles and written by Claude Binyon, based on the 1935 novel of the same name by Barry Benefield. The film stars Gladys George, Arline Judge, John Howard, Dudley Digges, Harry Carey, and Isabel Jewell.

Valiant Is the Word for Carrie was theatrically released in the United States on October 2, 1936, by Paramount Pictures. The film earned George the only Academy Award nomination in her career for her portrayal of the title character.

== Plot ==
Carrie Snyder is a prostitute who is forced out of the fictional southern town of Crebillon after forming a friendship with a young boy named Paul, whose dying mother is unable to stop her son from visiting such a woman. After Carrie leaves town, Paul runs away from his abusive father and meets a girl named Lady who has run away from a burning trainwreck, not wanting to go back to the people she was with. Carrie comes back for Paul and ends up taking Paul and Lady to New York with her. Carrie gets an apartment and starts a successful chain of laundry stores. Eventually they become rich and Lady becomes attracted to Paul. Paul, however, feels obligated to take care of a young woman named Lili whose brother's death he caused (the brother had been pushing Paul to try to get on the train, but when Paul pushed back, the train door closed with the brother on the outside with his coat stuck in the train door, causing him to get dragged along with the train and his legs to be run over). Lilli pretends to love Paul because he is rich, which Carrie is able to see, but which Paul does not. She devises a plan to make Lilli leave. She tells Lilli that if she will leave Paul, she will help get Lilli's true love out of jail. They attempt to break the man out of jail, but are caught. Lilli is fatally shot and Carrie is sent to jail. An old lawyer friend vows to fight for her freedom, but Carrie decides to plead guilty because she doesn't want Lady to know about her past as a prostitute. She also fears it would tarnish the reputation of the children. The lawyer ends by remarking to Paul's employer that "valiant is the word for Carrie".

== Cast ==
- Gladys George as Carrie Snyder
- Arline Judge as Lady
- John Howard as Paul Darnley
- Dudley Digges as Dennis Ringrose
- Harry Carey as Phil Yonne
- Isabel Jewell as Lilli Eipper, sister of Franz Eipper
- Jackie Moran as Paul Darnley as a child
- Charlene Wyatt as Lady as a child
- John Wray as George Darnley, Paul Darnley's father
- William Collier, Sr. as Ed Moresby, a town councilman who convinces Carrie to leave town before she is forced out
- Hattie McDaniel as Ellen Belle, the Darnleys' servant
- Lew Payton as Lon Olds, a horse-and-buggy driver in Crebillon
- Maude Eburne as Maggie Devlin, works with Paul
- Grady Sutton as Mat Burdon, a man Lady meets and hastily marries
- Janet Young as Mrs. Darnley, Paul Darnley's dying mother
- Adrienne D'Ambricourt as Madame Odette Desolles, owner of the original Desolles laundry shop that Carrie buys
- Helen Lowell as Mrs. Wadsworth, a town councilwoman in Crebillon
- Bernard Suss as Franz Eipper
- George "Gabby" Hayes as Bearded Man (as George F. Hayes)
- Irving Bacon as Drug Store Clerk
- Olive Hatch as Girl
- Nick Lukats as Boy
- Don Zelaya as Nick Dorapopolos

== Literary antecedents ==
The film was preceded by two literary versions by Barry Benefield: a short story and later a novel based on it.

=== Short story ===
Benefield's original short story, titled "With Banners Blowing", was published in the Woman's Home Companion, and later appeared in two collections under the title "Carrie Snyder".

The original story focused entirely on events in the (fictional) town of Crebillion, Louisiana. Carrie Snyder is 31 years old, lives in a cottage at the edge of town and maintains herself as a prostitute, having a circle of regular customers. She has plenty of free time to cultivate her beloved flower garden, and is content with this life. However, though rather fond of such customers as U.S. Marshall Phil Yonne, who behave "like gentlemen", she has never felt love for anybody until the seven-year-old Paul comes in to ask for a drink of water.

Carrie becomes instantly and deeply attached to the clever, sensitive, warm-hearted boy who comes again and again on secret visits, deposits with her his box of "treasures" which his father tried to confiscate and lets her take care of wounded creatures which he found—a tomcat and an owl. The African-American taxi driver Lon is Carrie and Paul's friend and confidant, keeping their secret. (Strangely for modern sensibilities, the word "nigger" is repeatedly used for this highly positive and sympathetic character, clearly without any hint of pejorative intent.)

Deeply jealous of Paul's mother, who can have him every day, Carrie is aware that this friendship would not last, and that the town's established society would cut it off once discovered. And so indeed it does come to pass, and even worse than Carrie feared. Hearing that Paul was severely beaten by his father, and witnessing him being chased and cruelly teased and hazed by a gang of other boys, Carrie realizes that for Paul's sake she must leave the town, let her beloved garden deteriorate, and never come back. The original story ends poignantly with Carrie going into a self-imposed exile, with the clear implication that she would never see Paul again.

=== Novel ===
Barry Benefield later took up the story and made a revised version of it, the first chapter of which became the 1936 novel Valiant Is the Word for Carrie.

Bar minor differences, the film's plot, as described above, followed the novel's plot up to the moment of the attempted jail break. From that point on, however, novel and film drastically diverge. In the original novel, the jailbreak succeeded without a hitch, and Lili and her lover were able to escape to Canada and start a new life there. Carrie returned unscathed to New York, her part in the jail break completely unknown. Later, Lady divorced the Baltimore millionaire Mat Burdon whom she married to spite Paul; Lady and Paul then married and lived happily ever after; and at the end of the novel Carrie, who managed to pull her laundry business through the slump of 1929, is prepared to play loving foster grandmother to their first child.

However, the germ of the film's ending - with the jail break going wrong and Carrie being arrested and facing trial - is present in the novel as a conversation about "what might have been" and "how things might have gone wrong".

== Reception ==
Frank S. Nugent of The New York Times called the film "more moral and uplifting than Pollyanna" and "irresistibly attractive". He criticized the running time for being almost two hours. He concluded that "The misfortune is that 'valiant' is only one of the words for Carrie; another would be 'disproportionate.' The picture takes too long, although doing it well, to introduce a little which is not well done at all."

== Cultural references ==
In 1938, the Three Stooges made a short titled Violent Is the Word for Curly, a takeoff on the name of this then-popular film.
