= Hammond Clock Company =

Hammond
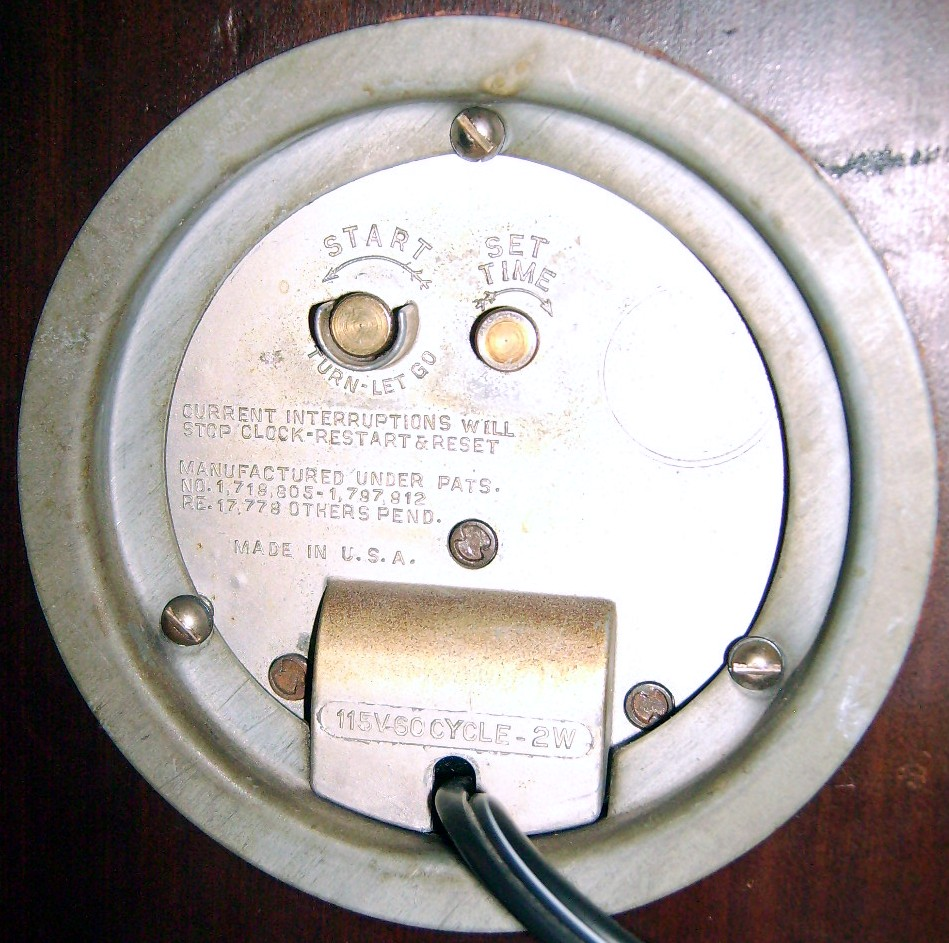
- Back of a Hammond electric clock with the characteristic starting knob
- Formerly: Hammond Clock Company (1928 – 1935); Hammond Organ Company (1935 – 1985); Hammond Organ Australia (1986 – 1989); Hammond-Suzuki (1989 – present)
- Company type: Subsidiary
- Industry: Clockmaking (1928–1935); Musical instruments (1935–present)
- Founded: Chicago, Illinois (USA, 1928)
- Founder: Laurens Hammond
- Headquarters: Evanston, Illinois
- Area served: Worldwide
- Key people: Donald Leslie
- Products: Electric clocks (1928–1935); Electromechanical organs (1935–present)
- Parent: Suzuki

The Hammond Clock Company of Chicago (Illinois) produced electric clocks between 1928 and 1941. It was one of the ventures of Laurens Hammond, the inventor of the famous Hammond organ.

== Invention of the Hammond clock motor ==
As Stuyvesant Barry reports in his biography of Laurens Hammond, Hammond himself acknowledged that his invention of the clock that was to bear his name was inspired by the success of Henry Warren's Telechron clocks. Upon discovering the Telechron technology, Hammond designed a motor that was synchronous, like Warren's, that is to say, it rotated at a speed that was tied to the frequency of the current supplied by the power grid. In this way, any clock operated by such a motor would run with great precision as long as the operators of the power grid kept the current's frequency constant. This had become possible since the introduction of the Warren master clock, an innovation of which Hammond took full advantage with his own invention. Hammond's motor, however, differed from Warren's in a number of respects: above all, it ran more slowly and was not self-starting. (Warren had patented his self-starting technology.) The latter Hammond did not consider to be a disadvantage; he believed that people would be misled by their clocks if they restarted automatically after a power outage. As Hammond's new clock motor was not self-starting, his clocks possessed a characteristic little knob on the back that one had to spin to start the motor.

== The company ==
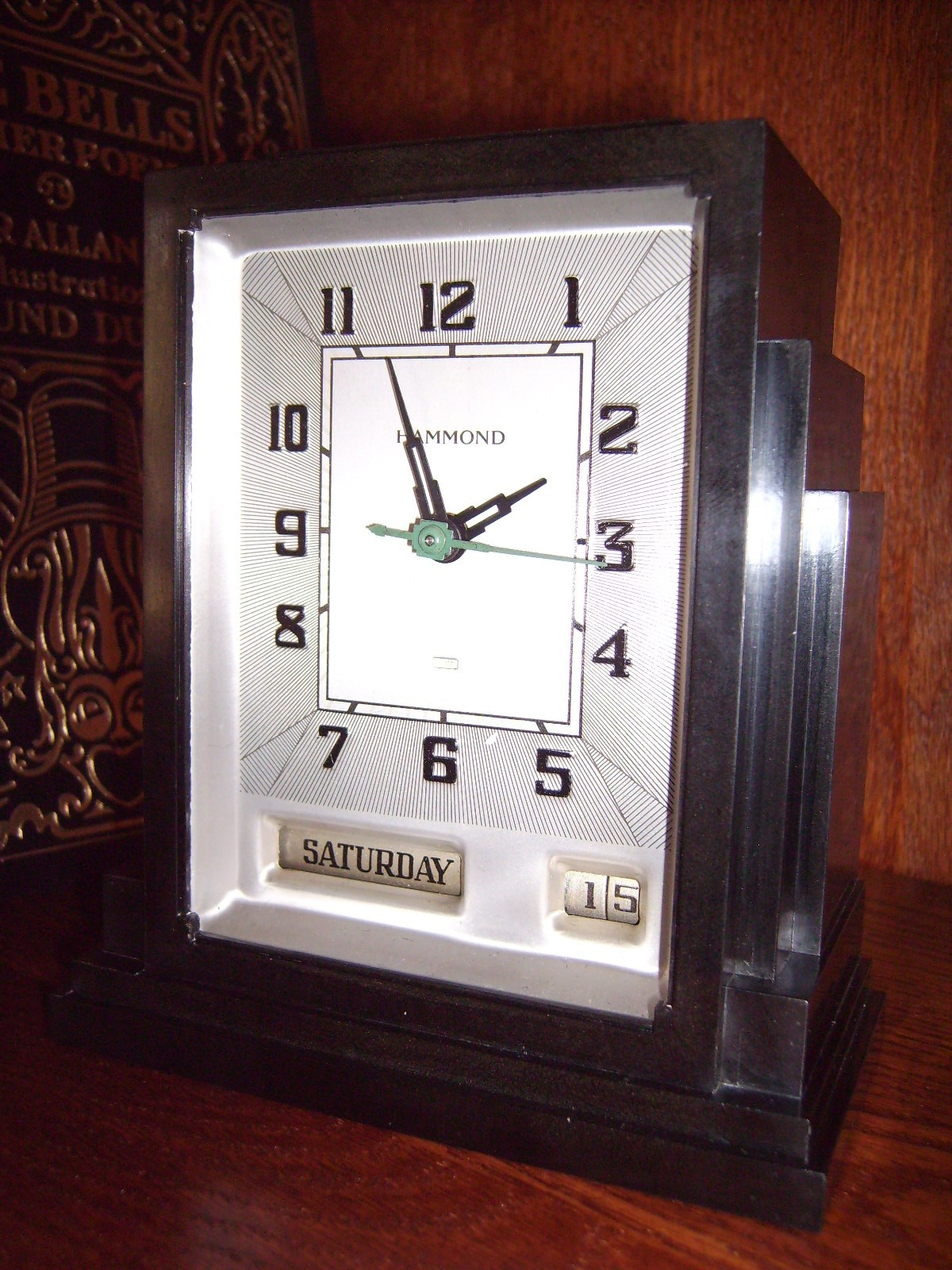
Due to its distinctive art deco skyscraper design, the "Gregory" is the most famous and popular clock among Hammond collectors.

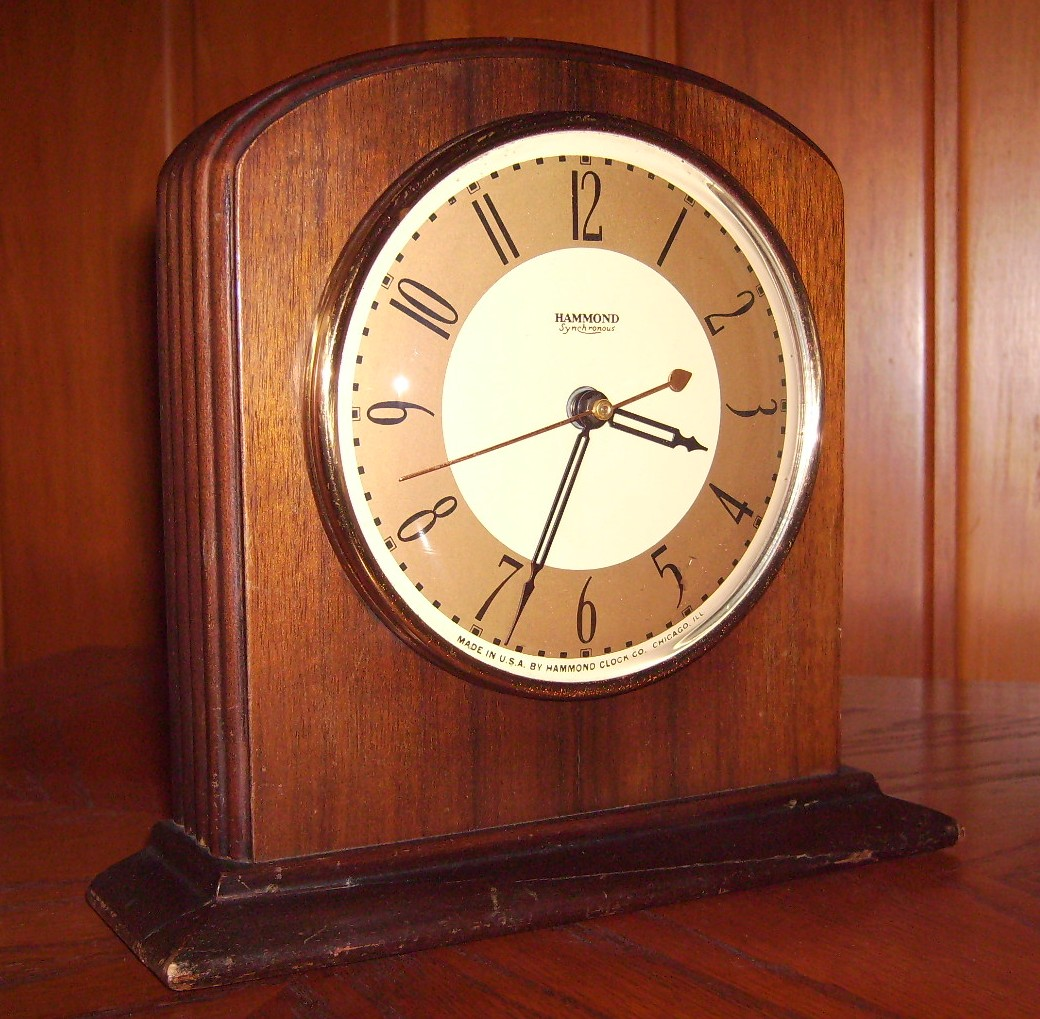
The Hammond clock model "Como"

The Hammond Clock Company was founded in 1928 to produce and market clocks that were equipped with Hammond's new motor. The Hammond clock factory manufactured more than 100 different clock models, some simple and cheap, others made from expensive materials such as marble and onyx. Hammond employed well-paid toolmakers who created sophisticated tools to stamp out the various components of his clocks, which could then be assembled in a belt operation by unskilled laborers. In addition, Hammond licensed his invention to other clock makers such as Waterbury, Sessions, and Ingraham.

In 1932, the economic troubles of the Great Depression threatened the clock-making industry; about 150 clock companies went out of business. To make matters worse, Hammond's licensees discovered that Hammond's patent on his motor was invalid, due to an earlier German invention of the same technology. In this situation, Hammond attempted to save his factory by starting the production of an electric bridge table. This proved to be nothing but a fleeting success. Hammond did finally manage to save his company in 1931 with a $75,000.00 contract from the Postal Telegraph Company, for putting their company name on large electric wall clocks. These clocks were to replace old key-wind clocks in railroad stations. What further saved the company was his invention of the Hammond organ. His first model, the Model A Console organ was released in 1935, year in which his company was renamed "The Hammond Organ Company" to reflect the new emphasis. The production of clocks was discontinued entirely in 1941.
