= Texas, Brooklyn & Heaven =

1948 film by William Castle

- Film poster
- Directed by: William Castle
- Screenplay by: Lewis Meltzer
- Adaptation by: Earl Baldwin
- Based on: Eddie and The Archangel Mike by Barry Benefield
- Produced by: Robert Golden
- Starring: Guy Madison; Diana Lynn; James Dunn; Florence Bates
- Cinematography: William C. Mellor
- Edited by: James E. Newcom
- Music by: Arthur Lange
- Production company: Robert S. Golden Productions
- Distributed by: United Artists
- Release date: July 16, 1948
- Running time: 76 minutes
- Country: United States
- Language: English
- Budget: nearly $1 million

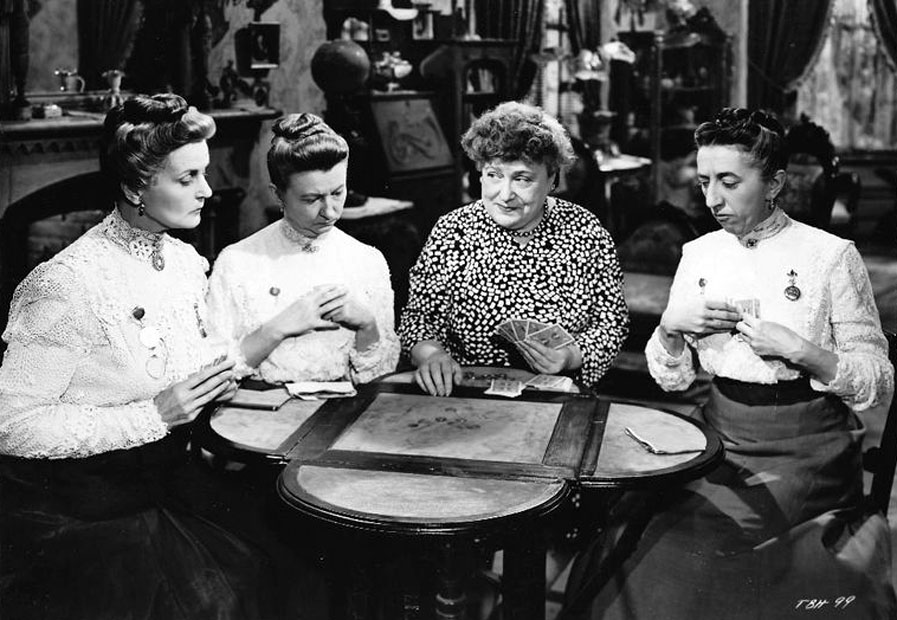
Mandy (Florence Bates, second from right) teaches the Cheever sisters (from left: Moyna MacGill, Irene Ryan, and Margaret Hamilton) how to play poker.

Texas, Brooklyn & Heaven is a 1948 American black-and-white romantic comedy film directed by William Castle and starring Guy Madison, Diana Lynn, James Dunn, and Florence Bates. A reporter in Dallas, Texas goes to New York with the dream of becoming a playwright. En route, he picks up a hitchhiker who wants to visit Brooklyn and live with horses. The two encounter a variety of zany characters living in Brooklyn before returning to Texas together to live on a horse ranch. The script was based on the best-selling 1943 novel Eddie and The Archangel Mike by Barry Benefield.

== Plot ==
Mike, a bartender at the Texas Golden Horse bar in Brooklyn, narrates the story of Eddie Tayloe to a new customer. Eddie was working as a reporter assigned to the Ft. Worth desk of a Dallas newspaper. As the two neighboring cities were feuding, he has nothing to do. He dreams of becoming a playwright in New York City, and a small inheritance from his grandfather gives him his chance. Quitting his job, he begins the long drive to New York. When his car breaks down, he meets Perry Dunklin, who is hitchhiking with her suitcases. She helps him fix the car, having picked up the skill working with her brother in a gas station, and she joins him for the trip to New York. At first Eddie is wary of her, but the more time they spend together, the more interested he becomes in her. Perry warns him, though, not to fall in love with her.

Perry says goodbye in Brooklyn and goes off to realize her dream of living with horses, but Eddie can't forget her. He finishes writing his play and goes around showing it to agents, but no one wants it. Perry, meanwhile, is traveling on a train when Mandy, an older woman with a criminal record for larceny, tries to pinch her wallet. Perry traps her in the act and Mandy faints. When the police arrive, Perry feels sorry for Mandy and claims she is her mother. The two move in together, to an empty stable behind the Cheever house in Flatbush, owned by three morose spinsters. Perry tells the Cheever sisters that Mandy is Eddie's mother too.

When Perry finds a job working for a girlie show in Coney Island, Mandy takes Eddie to see what she's doing and he is upset at how men are ogling her. He confides his woes to Mike over a few shots of Mike's original alcoholic concoction. Afterwards, Mike treats his hangover with some fresh air in Prospect Park and a trip to a Turkish bath, and then introduces Eddie to Mr. Gaboolian, owner of a "riding academy" of mechanical animals, including two horses, a camel, and an elephant, which has only two regular customers. Knowing Perry's love of horses, Eddie pays Mr. Gaboolian to hire Perry, but although she tries to apply her business skills to improve the place, business remains bad. Eddie buys the business with his last $800 so Perry will still have a job running it.

On Christmas Eve, a group of Santa Clauses converge on the academy at midnight to avoid going home, and Eddie sees an opportunity for publicity. He calls all the newspapers, who send photographers. Mandy and the Cheever sisters come too, and soon all are drinking liquor and riding the horses. Suddenly the electricity goes haywire and all the mechanical animals speed up and break apart. Nevertheless, the Cheever sisters have a wonderful time, and offer to buy the place. Eddie and Perry return to Texas and buy a horse ranch, where they live happily ever after.

== Cast ==
- Guy Madison as Eddie Tayloe
- Diana Lynn as Perry Dunklin
- James Dunn as Mike
- Michael Chekhov as Mr. Gaboolian
- Florence Bates as Mandy
- Lionel Stander as Bellhop
- William Frawley as Agent
- Roscoe Karns as Carmody
- Margaret Hamilton as Ruby Cheever
- Irene Ryan as Opal Cheever
- Colin Campbell as MacWirther
- Clem Bevans as Capt. Bjorn
- Moyna Macgill as Pearl Cheever
- Audie Murphy as Copy Boy

== Production ==
=== Development ===
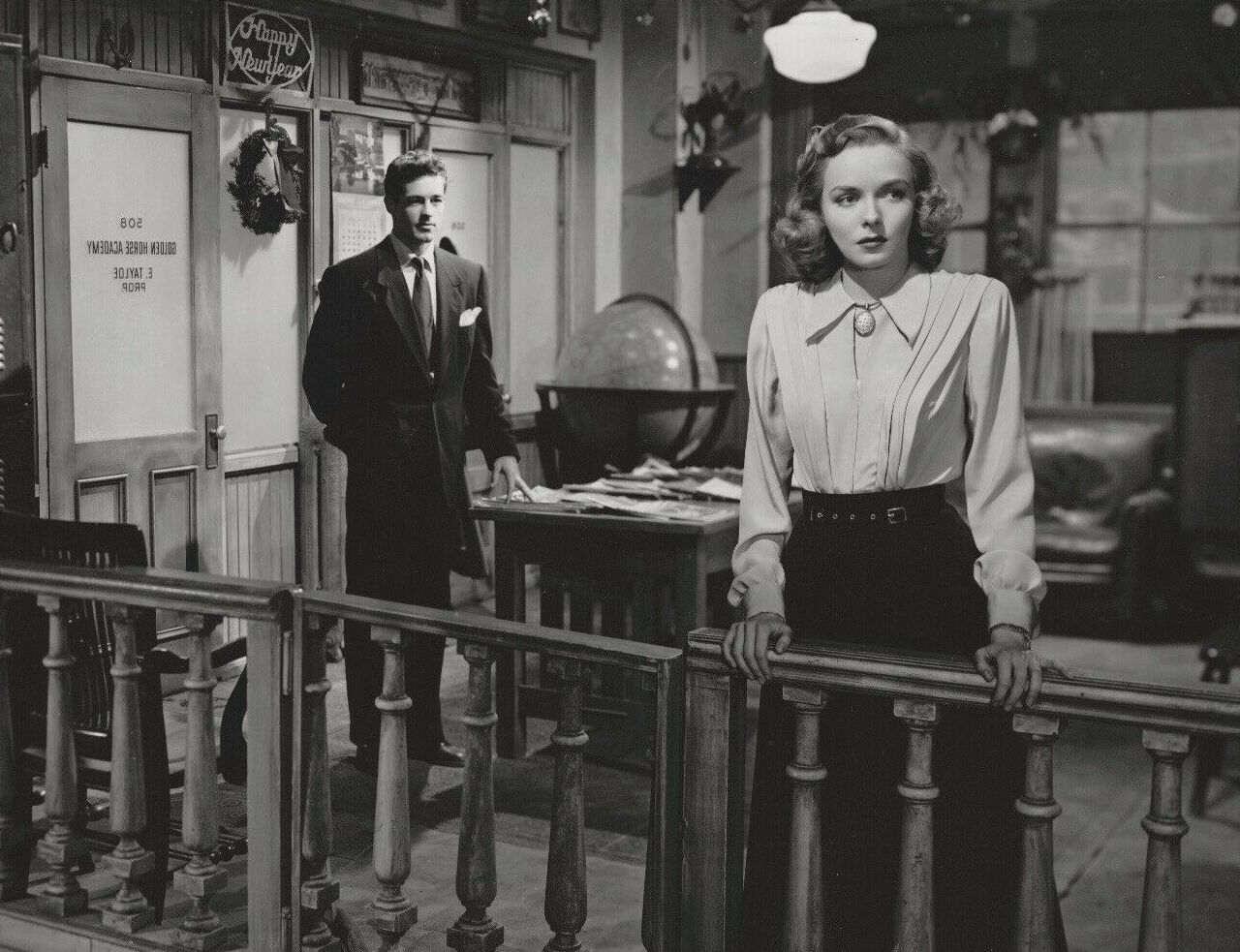
Publicity photo of Guy Madison and Diana Lynn in the film

The screenplay was adapted from the best-selling 1943 novel Eddie and the Archangel Mike by Barry Benefield. Critic Don Graham notes that a poll taken in the early 1940s indicated that Texas, Brooklyn, and Heaven were the places that had the biggest box-office appeal; he opines that the screenplay was therefore crafted around the title concept. According to The Hollywood Reporter, Benefield's novel was re-titled Texas, Brooklyn & Heaven when it was reissued after the film's release.

This was director William Castle's first comedy film. Jordan notes that many elements of the characters' lives parallel Castle's own life experiences.

=== Casting ===
The two lead actors, Guy Madison and Diana Lynn, received top billing over the title. A special note in the opening credits states: "Mr. Guy Madison appears by arrangement with David O. Selznick". The film marked the second screen appearance for Audie Murphy, who has a bit part as a copy boy. Murphy received $500 for the part and was allowed to keep four shirts that he wore for a promotional ad. Director Castle had a cameo as the newspaper's drama editor, who calls out "Boy!" to hand his story over to Murphy.

=== Music ===
Ervin Drake and Jimmy Shirl wrote the music and lyrics for the title song, "Texas, Brooklyn & Heaven".

=== Filming ===
Filming took place from mid-January to mid-February 1948. Graham notes that the establishing shots of downtown Dallas in the beginning of the film include a view of the Texas School Book Depository in Dealey Plaza, which later played an infamous role in the 1963 assassination of John F. Kennedy.

== Release ==
Texas, Brooklyn & Heaven was released on July 16, 1948. Although it was copyrighted with a runtime of 89 minutes, the film was cut down to 76 minutes for its release. It was released in Great Britain under the title The Girl from Texas.

A month before the Brooklyn premiere on October 1, United Artists held a beauty contest during the Coney Island Mardi Gras, with the winner being named "Most Heavenly Miss". The Brooklyn premiere of the film included a stage program in which James Dunn, himself a Brooklyn native, presented prizes to two young women chosen as "Most Heavenly Misses from Brooklyn" and a third winner of "Most Heavenly Miss" from Texas.

== Critical reception ==
The film was poorly received by critics, who called it lightweight and nonsensical in parts. Variety described the film as "rambling", having "neither plot nor point. Story begins uncertainly, proceeds aimlessly and ends abruptly". This review surmised that the runtime had to be cut to fit the requirements of a double-bill feature, but poor editing left some scenes "dangling in the middle, wholly unexplained". While Madison was described as "pleasant" and Lynn as "likable", Variety cited the best performances as those of Lionel Stander as the bellhop and Florence Bates as the pickpocket.

The Fort Worth Star-Telegram agreed that "Florence Bates as a frowzy pickpocket steals the show". Madison himself acknowledged that character actors Stander, Dunn, and Michael Chekhov were "holding the picture together. They have an uncanny sense of timing and instinct as to just how a scene should be played. It's going to take me a long time to come anywhere near that score", added Madison, who was signed by David O. Selznick on the basis of his good looks rather than his acting ability.

The New York Daily News disliked the film for its clichéd plot points and poor acting on the part of the leads. While acknowledging Madison as handsome and Lynn as cute, The Gazette review concludes that this is "[a] movie that won't make you too unhappy either to see or to miss".

A modern review by AllMovie contends that the film "tries hard for zaniness, but the result at best is silliness and all too often is simply dull". It blames the script for being "random and haphazard", and for creating "pretty stock characters in pretty stock situations spouting stock words and phrases". This review also calls Madison's performance "fairly wooden", but commends Lynn for doing her best with her role.

== Bibliography ==
- Fetrow, Alan G. (1994). Feature Films, 1940-1949: A United States Filmography. McFarland. ISBN 978-0899509143.
- Graham, Don (1989). No Name on the Bullet: A Biography of Audie Murphy. Viking. ISBN 0-670-81511-X.
- Jordan, Joe (2014). Showmanship: The Cinema of William Castle. BearManor Media. ISBN 978-1-59393-584-9.
