= Barry Benefield =

American writer (1877–1971)

- Born: May 12, 1877; Jefferson, Texas
- Died: September 22, 1971 (aged 94); Jefferson, Texas
- Occupation: Writer

Barry Benefield (full name John Barry Benefield ) (May 12, 1877 in Jefferson, Texas – September 22, 1971 in Jefferson, Texas) was an American writer, some of whose books were adapted for the cinema. His being born and spending much of his life in Texas is more than a biographical detail: Benefield had been mentioned as "One of The Lone Star writers", who "Followed the Southern tradition".

== Life ==
Barry Benefield was the son of Benjamin Jefferson Benefield (1839–1928), who ran a wagon yard/feed store, and of Harriet Adelaide née Barry (1850–1915), who was herself a writer and who would encourage him to do the same.

He was born in Jefferson at a time when it was a major East Texas city, though its decline – due to becoming inaccessible to river traffic – happened in his own early years.

Benefield's father had a wagon yard where he worked in his youth. At that time the young Barry Benefield gained much knowledge of the region's character and lore, which would later influence his literary work. In 1897 his family purchased a house built in the 1860s, which would remain in Benefield's possession and where he would spend his last years.

Benefield graduated from the University of Texas and became a journalist and afterwards a novelist.

His wife was Lucille Stallcup (1886–1960), a fellow native of Jefferson. They were married at Chicago in 1914. Lucille died at New York City in 1960.

Some of Benefield's books, such as Valiant Is the Word for Carrie (1935), are written from the point of view of a Southerner who feels an exile living in the North, and who longs for the more carefree life of a small Southern town, undoubtedly reflecting the writer's own feeling. In retirement, Benefield returned to Jefferson and lived in his old family home until his death at the age of 94.

== Works ==
=== Books ===
- The Chicken-Wagon Family (1925) - adapted to film in 1939 as Chicken Wagon Family
- Short Turns (1926)
- Bugles in the Night (1927)
- A Little Clown Lost (1928)
- Valiant Is the Word for Carrie (1935) - adapted to film in 1936
- April Was When It Began (1939)
- Eddie and the Archangel Mike (1943) - adapted to film in 1948 as Texas, Brooklyn & Heaven

=== Stories (partial) ===
- Daughters of Joy (The Smart Set, May 1913)
- Simply Sugar-Pie (The Seven Arts, November 1916.)
- Bachelor Embalmerus, (The Smart Set, June 1913)
- Jerry, (The Smart Set, August 1913)
- Christmas Eve's Day (Woman's Home Companion, Dec. 1926)
- The Law is a Jealous Mistress (Woman's Home Companion, Dec. 1928)
- God's Old Fields (Good Housekeeping, Dec. 1928)
- Coming Home (Collier's, Nov. 10, 1928)
- Love (in The World's One Hundred Best Short Stories [In Ten Volumes], (1927), volume four)
- With Banners Blowing (Women's Home Companion), in two collections published as Carrie Snyder, later expanded into the novel Valiant is the word for Carrie.

== Bibliography ==
- Prof. Donald W. Hatley, “Folklore in the Short Fiction of Barry Benefield,”, Mississippi Quarterly, XXI, No. 1 (Winter, 1967–68), pp. 63–75
- Barry Benefield Papers 1911-1937, (collection of literary productions), deposited at the Dolph Briscoe Center for American History, University of Texas at Austin

== Critical opinion ==
"Jefferson native Barry Benefield was a writer who had serious intentions, but his work now seems dated and flat. The first section of his novel Valiant Is the Word for Carrie is excellent, but the rest of the novel is trivial. Nevertheless, Carrie was made into a film." (James Ward Lee, " Adventures with a Texas humanist")
