= Charlie Chan at the Opera =

1936 film by H. Bruce Humberstone

- Directed by: H. Bruce Humberstone
- Written by: Bess Meredyth
- Produced by: John Stone
- Starring: Warner Oland; Boris Karloff
- Cinematography: Lucien Andriot
- Music by: William Kernell
- Production company: 20th Century Fox
- Distributed by: 20th Century Fox
- Release date: 1936
- Running time: 68 minutes
- Country: United States
- Budget: $125,000
- Box office: $500,000

Charlie Chan at the Opera is the 13th film starring Warner Oland as protagonist Charlie Chan, with Boris Karloff portraying the principal suspect and faux operatic music composed by Oscar Levant. The film was directed by H. Bruce Humberstone for 20th Century-Fox in 1936.

Oland and Demarest also appeared in The Jazz Singer (1927).

== Plot ==
Charlie Chan gets a chance to watch a popular opera performance. For seven years, opera star Gravelle has been locked in an insane asylum, his identity a mystery – even to himself. But when his memory unexpectedly returns, he begins to recall that his wife and her lover tried to murder him – and now he's determined to make them face the music. Gravelle escapes from the asylum and makes his way to the San Marco opera house and begins hiding out in the various rooms and passageways. Soon, members of the opera company are being murdered one by one.

Chan soon investigates the killings and despite the presence of Gravelle, there are other suspects who may be the real killer. The suspects, excluding Gravelle, include Lilli Rochelle, the opera company's prima donna who has been having a secret affair with Enrico Barelli, the baritone; Mr. Whitely, Madame Rochelle's husband who has warned Barelli to stay away from his wife; Anita Barelli, the opera company's number two soprano who has learned of her husband's affair with Lilli Rochelle; and Phil Childers, the fiancée of Lilli's unacknowledged daughter who has been refused permission to marry the daughter.

Clues found by Chan to apprehend the killer include a torn newspaper, a charred note, a heel mark on a newspaper picture, and a bloodstained belt. Among the questions asked are who has been threatening Lilli Rochelle's life, the mystery man in Barelli's dressing room before he is murdered, and why does Chan insist that the opera be performed twice in one evening?

== Cast ==
- Warner Oland as Charlie Chan
- Boris Karloff as Gravelle
- Keye Luke as Lee Chan, (Chan's "Number 1 Son")
- Charlotte Henry as Mlle. Kitty
- William Demarest as Sergeant Kelly
- Guy Usher as Inspector Regan
- Margaret Irving as Lilli Rochelle
- Gregory Gaye as Enrico Borelli
- Nedda Harrigan as Anita Borelli
- Frank Conroy as Mr. Whitely
- Stanley Blystone as Backstage Cop (uncredited)
- Gladden James as Secretary (uncredited)

Levant composed the music for the onscreen opera Carnival. Future Number 3 Son Tommy Chan actor Benson Fong is an opera extra.

== Critical response ==
Variety reported that "Chan’s interminable saga gets a shot in the arm which effectively dispels any monotony," that "the action [...] is more complicated than in previous Chan stories and serves as an additional befuddlement for the tyro sleuths in the audience," and noted that as "a cross between a madman and an amnesia victim, Karloff plays a role right down his alley." A review of the film in The New York Times described it as "by far the best of the recent crop of Chan pictures," noting that "once the story gets under way, it flows smoothly and swiftly" and "Mr. Chan tackles this latest assignment in his usual leisurely but thoroughgoing fashion, a style of sleuthing which unfortunately necessitates allowing a few more people, in this case a prima donna and her admirer, to be murdered practically under his nose before he unmasks the culprit."
