= Dona Drake =

American actress, singer and dancer (1914–1989)

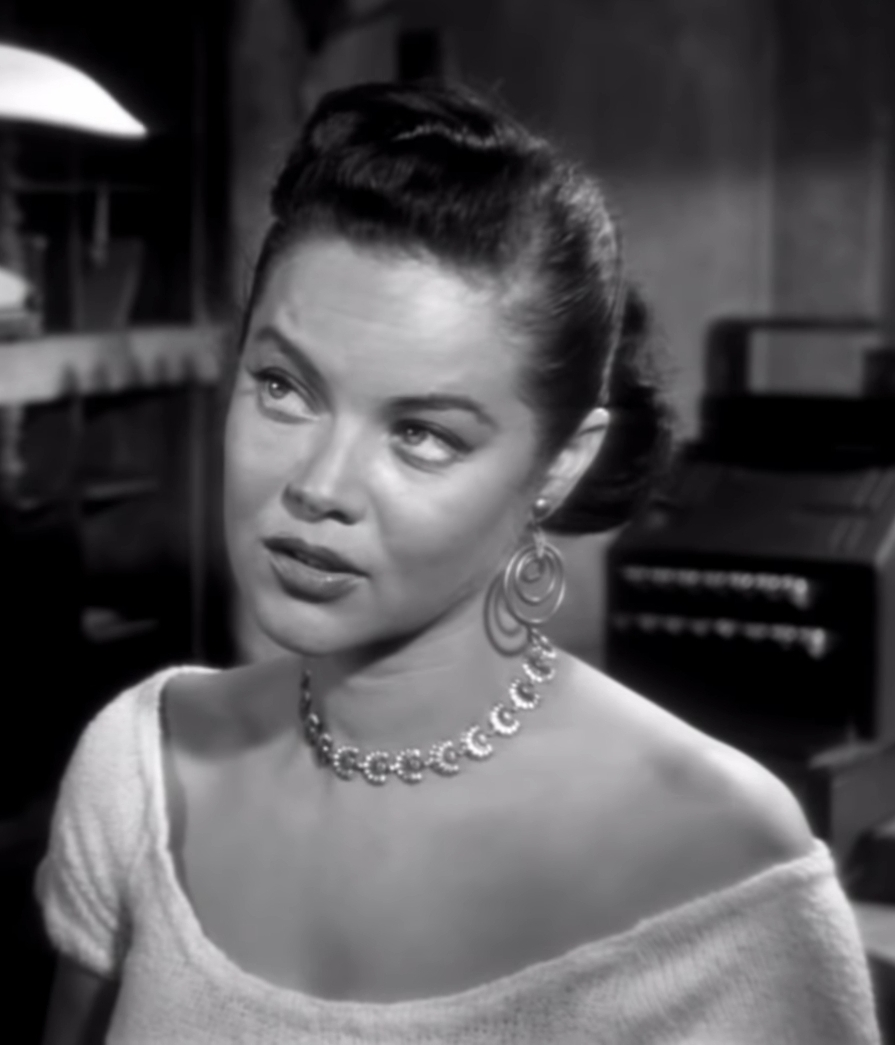
- Drake in Kansas City Confidential (1952)
- Born: Eunice Westmoreland; November 15, 1914; Miami, Florida, U.S.
- Died: June 20, 1989 (aged 74); Los Angeles, California, U.S.
- Other names: Una Novella; Rita Novella; Rita Rio; Una Velon (or Una Villon); Rita Shaw; Dona Travilla
- Occupations: Actress; singer; dancer
- Years active: 1933–1977
- Spouse: William Travilla (m. 1944)
- Children: 1

Dona Drake (/ˈdoʊnə/ DOH-nə; November 15, 1914 – June 20, 1989) was an American singer, dancer, and film actress in the 1930s and 1940s. She was typically cast in ethnic roles including Latin American and Middle Easterners. Drake often presented herself as Mexican and went by the names Una Novella and Rita Novella. As Rita Rio, she led a touring all-girl orchestra in the early 1940s, also known as "Dona Drake and her Girl Band", among other names for her musical and dance acts.

== Early life ==
Drake was born Eunice Westmoreland in Miami, Florida on November 15, 1914 to Joseph Andrew Westmoreland, Sr. and Novella (née Smith). She had four siblings.

=== Ethnicity ===
The 1910 United States census, taken in Florida, lists her father as black and her mother, taken in Alabama, as black. The 1920 United States census, taken in Florida, records her and her parents as being mulatto. The 1930 United States census, taken in Pennsylvania, records her and her parents as being negro. The 1950 United States census, taken in Pennsylvania, records her father and brother as negro and Drake (under the name Dona Travilla), taken in California, as white. Drake was of African American heritage. Drake often presented herself as Hispanic and reportedly spoke Spanish but had no documented Hispanic, Spanish, or Latin American heritage. Her father was from Arkansas and her mother was from Alabama.

== Career ==
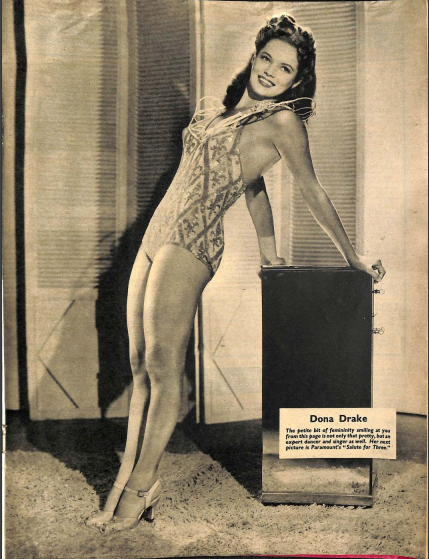
Pin-up photo of Drake for Yank, the Army Weekly in 1943

Entering show business in the 1930s, she used the names Una Velon (pronounced YOO-nə; also spelled Una Villon), Rita Rio and Rita Shaw. The newspapers of the day ascribed her billed-name changes to “Rita Shaw,” and then to “Dona Drake,” as Paramount’s.

=== Una Villon ===
She began performing in 1932, working under the name Una Villon as a chorus girl and in nightclubs. As Una Villon, she appeared in Earl Carroll's Vanities in 1933, prompting Paul Harrison to write in a review printed in The Indiana Gazette: "Most noteworthy newcomer is Miss Una Villon who sings, dances and looks like a 16-year-old incarnation of Ann Pennington. Only a couple of days before the premiere she was hired away from a Broadway night club and already has proved her right to a place in the big-time spotlight."

In 1934, columnist Walter Winchell wrote about her performance in a night club: "Una Villon's torso shifting serves to synchronize the tempos instead of Berren's directing — this young lady directs the tooters with her wiggling."

=== Rita Rio and Rita Shaw ===
She began using the name Rita Rio in 1935, when she was featured at the Paradise cabaret on Broadway. Besides singing and dancing, she sometimes played piano, trumpet, clarinet, saxophone and drums and occasionally led the orchestra. In 1936, she and another woman formed an orchestra. After the group had financial problems in 1940, she went to Hollywood, where she had screen tests using the name Rita Shaw.

She settled on the stage name Dona Drake in the early 1940s. Studio publicity during her heyday incorrectly stated that Drake was of Mexican origin and was born Rita Novella (borrowing her mother's first name as a new last).

She was sometimes cast as an ethnic character, such as a Latina, Middle Easterner, American Indian, or Gypsy. She is perhaps best known for playing the American Indian maid of Bette Davis in Beyond the Forest. She also appeared as the Arab girl Mihirmah, opposite Bob Hope and Bing Crosby in Road to Morocco in 1942. In 1944 she appeared as a lead role as a big band singer in a B-movie titled Hot Rhythm, which also featured Irene Ryan (Granny from The Beverly Hillbillies) as a ditsy secretary.

Drake had a "non-ethnic", non-musical role as the second female lead in the 1949 comedy The Girl from Jones Beach, playing opposite Eddie Bracken. The year before, she gave a comic performance as the fortune-hunting sister in So This Is New York.

== Personal life ==
In 1936, Drake was questioned by the FBI about the murder of her then-boyfriend and known mobster, Louis Amberg. She claimed to only know him as "Mr. Cohen" and had no idea what he did for a living.

Drake married Oscar and Emmy award-winning fashion designer William Travilla on August 19, 1944. They had one daughter: Nia Novella Travilla (August 16, 1951 – October 1, 2002), who had no children. They remained a couple until her death. Travilla appeared on the March 24, 1960, episode of You Bet Your Life, hosted by Groucho Marx, and introduced his elegantly dressed wife to the audience.

== Filmography ==
Film and television
Year	Title	Role	Notes
1935	Moonlight and Melody	Rita	Short, credited as Rita Rio
1936	Strike Me Pink	Mademoiselle Fifi	credited as Rita Rio
1938	Sweet Shoe	Rita Rio	Short, credited as Rita Rio
1938	Beautiful, But Dummies	Model	Short, credited as Rita Ray
1939	Gals and Gallons	Orchestra Leader	credited as Rita Rio
1939	Rita Rio and Her Orchestra	Rita Rio	Short, played self in this 10-minute short
1941	Fresh as a Freshman	Chicquita	Short
1941	Aloma of the South Seas	Nea	first film credit as Dona Drake
1941	Louisiana Purchase	Beatrice	
1941	I Look at You	Rita Rio	Short, With Alan Ladd.
1942	Road to Morocco	Mihirmah	credited as Dona Drake
1942	Star Spangled Rhythm	Herself	performs song "On the Swing Shift" with Marjorie Reynolds and Betty Jane Rhodes
1943	Salute for Three	Dona Drake and Her Girl Band	credited as Dona Drake
1943	Let's Face It	Muriel	
1944	Hot Rhythm	Mary Adams	
1945	Hollywood Victory Caravan	Herself	Victory Bonds Short, performs song "Plain Jane Doe" with Betty Hutton
1946	Without Reservations	Dolores Ortega	
1946	Dangerous Millions	Elena Valdez	
1948	Another Part of the Forest	Laurette Sincee	
1948	So This Is New York	Kate Goff	
1949	The Doolins of Oklahoma	Cattle Annie	
1949	The Girl from Jones Beach	Connie Martin	
1949	Beyond the Forest	Jenny	
1950	Fortunes of Captain Blood	Pepita Maria Rosados	
1951	Valentino	Maria Torres	
1952	Kansas City Confidential	Teresa	
1953	The Bandits of Corsica	Zelda	
1953	Son of Belle Starr	Dolores	
1953	Down Laredo Way	Narita	
1953	Adventures of Superman	Joyce	Episode 35: "The Dog Who Knew Superman" 9th episode of 1953; aired 14 November
1954	Superman Flies Again	Joyce	theatrical re-release of 3 episodes of the television series included episode 35
1954	Princess of the Nile	Mirva	
1954	The Lone Wolf	Lee	Episode: "Deadline"
1954	City Detective	Francesca	Episode: "The Gift Shop"
1955	Soldiers of Fortune	Cheu	Episode: "The Runaway King"

== Preservation ==
Sweet Shoe was preserved and restored by the UCLA Film & Television Archive from 16mm prints. Restoration funding was provided by a grant from the GRAMMY Museum. The restoration had its world premiere at the 2024 UCLA Festival of Preservation.
