= Hoosier Holiday =

1943 film by Frank McDonald

- Theatrical release poster
- Directed by: Frank McDonald
- Screenplay by: Dorrell McGowan; Stuart E. McGowan
- Story by: Dorrell McGowan; Stuart E. McGowan
- Produced by: Armand Schaefer
- Starring: George D. Hay; Isabel Randolph; Shug Fisher; Lillian Randolph; Dale Evans; George Byron
- Cinematography: Reggie Lanning
- Edited by: Ralph Dixon
- Music by: Mort Glickman
- Production company: Republic Pictures
- Distributed by: Republic Pictures
- Release date: September 13, 1943
- Running time: 65 minutes
- Country: United States
- Language: English

Hoosier Holiday is a 1943 American comedy film directed by Frank McDonald and written by Dorrell McGowan and Stuart E. McGowan. The film stars George D. Hay, Isabel Randolph, Shug Fisher, Lillian Randolph, Dale Evans and George Byron. The film was released on September 13, 1943, by Republic Pictures.

== Cast ==
- George D. Hay as The Solemn Old Judge
- Isabel Randolph as Abigail Fairchild
- Shug Fisher as Shug' Fishet
- Lillian Randolph as Birdie
- Dale Evans as Dale Fairchild
- George Byron as Jim Baker
- Emma Dunn as Molly Baker
- Thurston Hall as Henry P. Fairchild
- Nick Stewart as Aloysius Lincoln
- Ferris Taylor as Governor Manning
- Georgia Davis as Grace Manning
- Sleepy Williams as Sleepy Williams
- Three Shades of Rhythm as Singers
- Ken Trietsch as Hotshot Ken
- Paul Trietsch as Hotshot Hezzie
- Charles Ward as Hotshot Gabe
- Frank Kettering as Hotshot Frank
- Gwen Verdon as Cheerleader
- The Hoosier Hotshots as Hoosier Hot Shots
- The Music Maids as Singers
