= Dan Harding's Wife =

1936-1939 radio soap opera

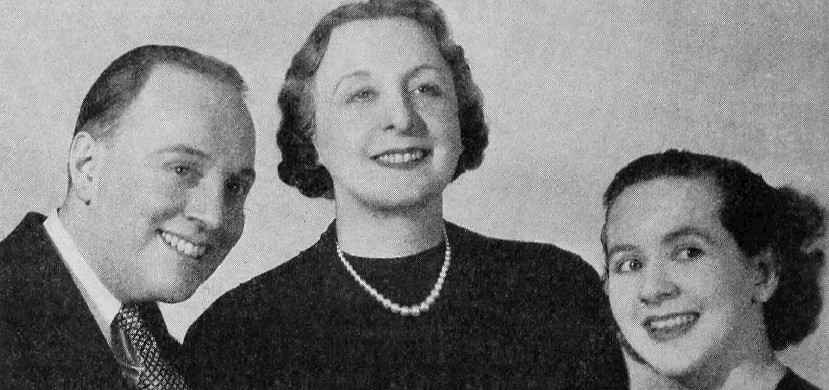
- The show's main cast in 1938 from left: Merrill Fugit, Isabel Randolph, Loretta Poynton
- Genre: Soap Opera
- Running time: 15 minutes
- Country of origin: United States
- Language: English
- Syndicates: NBC
- Starring: Isabel Randolph; Loretta Poynton
- Announcer: Les Griffith; Norman Berry
- Written by: Ken Robinson
- Directed by: J. Clinton Stanley
- Original release: January 20, 1936 – February 10, 1939

Dan Harding's Wife was a radio soap opera in the United States. The 15-minute program was broadcast on NBC from January 20, 1936, through February 10, 1939, and was sponsored by Nabisco for the first nine months of 1938. The show was written by Ken Robinson and directed by J. Clinton Stanley.

== Plot ==
A 1938 article in Radio Guide magazine commented, "The story of Dan Harding's Wife is one that will strike a warmly responsive note in the hearts of all wives and mothers who are, because of economic necessity, separated from their husbands.:

The broadcast was set 19 years after Dan and Rhoda Harding were married in South America. He was a mining engineer there, and she had come there with her father. An initially happy marriage ran into problems when Rhoda became pregnant. Dan felt that a mining camp would not be a good place to raise the twins, so he sent Rhoda and the babies to the United States. In the program, twins Donna and Dean were 18 years old. They had seen their father only once or twice a year at best. The reunions ended, however, when Rhoda received word that Dan had been killed in a mining disaster in Iraq. The article in Radio Guide summarized Rhoda's predicament: "Left almost penniless, Rhoda takes over a rooming house in the poorer section of the town and attempts to eke out a living."

== Cast ==
Buxton and Owen's The Big Broadcast lists the cast of Dan Harding's Wife as follows:

Character	Actor/Actress
Rhoda Harding	Isabel Randolph
Donna Harding	Loretta Poynton
Dean Harding	Merrill Fugit
Mrs. Graham	Judith Lowry
Arnie Topper	Carl Hanson
Eula Sherman	Margarette Shanna
Mr. Tiller	Cliff Soubier
Mr. Gorham	Cliff Soubier
Margot Gorham	Templeton Fox
Mabel Klooner	Templeton Fox
Fowler	Robert Griffin
Penny Latham	Alice Goodkin
Jack Garland	Willard Farnum
Stooge Lowe	Hugh Rowlands
Ralph Fraser	Herbert Nelson
Eva Foster	Tommye Birch
Rex Kramer	Herb Butterfield
Announcer	Les Griffith

Other sources list additional cast members as follows: Norman Berry (announcer) and Mercedes McCambridge (role not specified).

== See also ==
- List of radio soaps
