= Margaret Irving =

American actress (1898–1950)

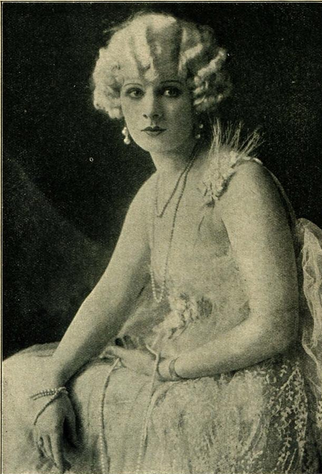
- Margaret Irving in 1923
- Born: January 18, 1898; Pittsburgh, Pennsylvania, US
- Died: March 15, 1988 (aged 90); Westminster, California, US
- Occupation: Actress
- Years active: 1922–1955
- Spouse: William Frederick James

Margaret Irving (January 18, 1898 – March 5, 1988) was an American stage and film actress. She is best remembered today for her roles as Aunt Gus in the 1950s sitcom The People's Choice and as Mrs. Whitehead in Animal Crackers (1930) starring the Marx Brothers, a role she originated on the Broadway stage.

== Biography ==
Margaret Irving was born in Pittsburgh, Pennsylvania on January 18, 1898. In 1917 she portrayed Lady of Dreams in the Broadway musical Jack O'Lantern at the Globe Theatre; a work created by Ivan Caryll, Anne Caldwell and R. H. Burnside. After this she worked for Florence Ziegfeld on Broadway in the revues Ziegfeld Follies of 1919 and Ziegfeld Follies of 1920 before appearing in Irving Berlin's Music Box Revue during the 1921-1922 and 1922-1923 seasons at the Music Box Theatre. This was followed by the role of June in William B. Friedlander and Con Conrad's Mercenary Mary (1925, Longacre Theatre); a show which lasted less than four months.

Irving created the role of Clementina in Sigmund Romberg's hit musical The Desert Song which had a long Broadway run at the Casino Theatre in 1926-1927. The production then transferred to first the Century Theatre (1927) and then the Imperial Theatre (1927-1928) for a collective run of 471 performances. This was followed by the role of Mrs. Whitehead in Bert Kalmar and Harry Ruby's musical Animal Crackers which had a successful run at the 44th Street Theatre with a cast led by the four Marx Brothers and Margaret Dumont. Irving reprised this role in the 1930 sound film adaptation of this show; having previously worked as a silent film actress in the pictures Radio-Mania (1922) and The Broadway Boob (1926).

During the 1930s Irving worked more often in film than on the stage. Some of her film credits during this decade included Sheer Luck (1931), Thanks a Million (1935), San Francisco (1936), Captain Calamity (1936), Follow Your Heart (1936), Charlie Chan at the Opera (1936), and Mr. Moto's Last Warning (1939). In 1939 she returned to the stage as Marguerite Worms in the play Where There's a Will at Broadway's John Golden Theatre. This was followed by multiple roles in the musical revue The Streets of Paris which ran at the Broadhurst Theatre in 1939-1940. In the 1940-1941 Broadway season she portrayed Sierra in E. Y. Harburg and Burton Lane's musical Hold On to Your Hats at the Shubert Theatre. Her final Broadway roles were Mrs. Warren in Harold Orlob's Hairpin Harmony (1943) and Gail in Anita Loos's Happy Birthday (1946). She also made a few films in the 1940s, including In Society (1944) and The Beautiful Cheat (1945). Her final film was Ain't Misbehavin' (1955).

She was married to William Frederick James. She died on March 5, 1988 in Westminster, California, at the age of 90.

== Filmography ==
Year	Title	Role	Notes and References
1922	Radio-Mania	Mary Langdon	
1926	The Broadway Boob	Mabel Golden	
1930	Animal Crackers	Mrs. Whitehead	
1931	Sheer Luck	Patsy	
1935	Thanks a Million	Mrs. Kruger	
1936	Exclusive Story	Mrs. Higgins	
1936	Wife vs. Secretary	Edna Wilson	
1936	Captain Calamity	Mamie Gruen	
1936	I Married a Doctor	Maude Dyer	
1936	San Francisco	Della Bailey	
1936	Women Are Trouble	Frances Blaine	
1936	Follow Your Heart	Louise Masetti	
1936	Four Days' Wonder	Aunt Jessica	
1936	Charlie Chan at the Opera	Mme. Lilli Rochelle	
1937	Men in Exile	Mother Haines	
1937	The Outcasts of Poker Flat	The Duchess	
1937	Wife, Doctor and Nurse	Mrs. Cunningham	
1937	Under Suspicion	Laura Walters	
1937	Sh! The Octopus	Polly Crane	
1938	Little Miss Roughneck	Mrs. Gertrude 'Gert' LaRue	
1938	The Baroness and the Butler	Countess Olga	
1938	Love, Honor and Behave	Nan Bowleigh	
1938	The Toy Wife	Madame DeCambri	
1938	Sweethearts	Madame	
1938	Kentucky	Woman with Man at Race Track	
1939	Mr. Moto's Last Warning	Madame Delacour	
1944	In Society	Mrs. Winthrop	
1945	The Beautiful Cheat	Olympia Haven	
1955	Ain't Misbehavin'	Mrs. Grumbacher	
