= Templeton Fox =

American actress (1913–1993)

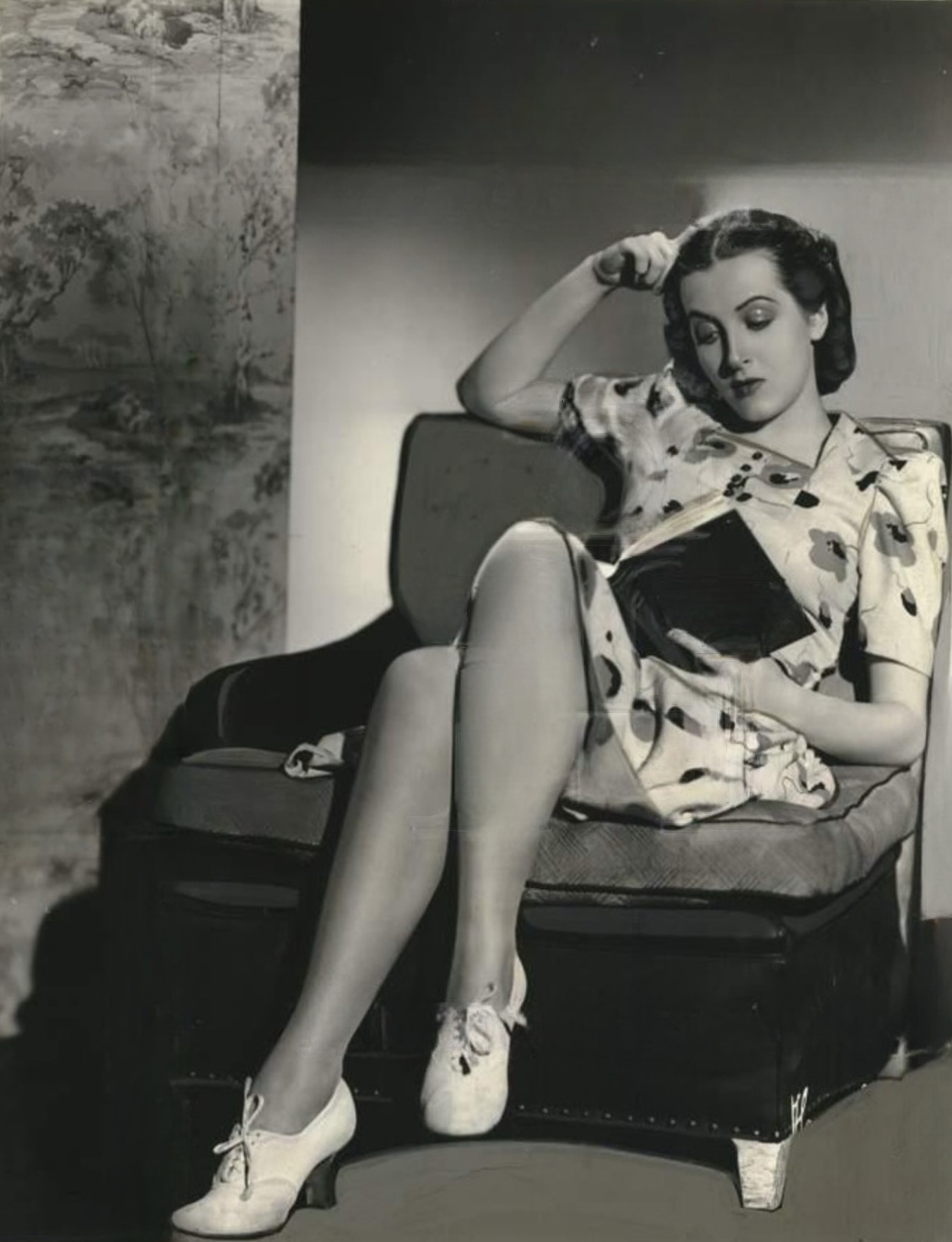
- Fox in 1938
- Born: Esther May Fox; July 24, 1916; Chicago, Illinois, U.S.
- Died: January 9, 1993 (aged 79); Los Angeles, California, U.S.
- Other names: Templeton Welch, Templeton McLeod
- Education: Pomona College
- Occupation: Actress
- Known for: Tony Rome
- Spouse: Robert Lyon Welch (m. 1938; died 1964) Reid McLeod (m. 1970–1993)
- Children: 2, including Bob Welch

Templeton Fox (July 24, 1916 – January 9, 1993) was an American actress best known for her work in old-time radio.

== Early years ==
Fox was the daughter of Lawrence Brainard Fox (1880 – 1960) and his wife, Anne "Annie" Templeton (1885 – 1948). Sources disagree as to where and when she was born. A 1938 issue of the Radio Mirror Almanac wrote she was born in Pasadena, California on July 24, 1913, but her birth record states she was born in Chicago, Illinois on July 24, 1916; the latter is better supported by official documents. She was raised in Elgin, Illinois and attended Pomona College. She won a talent contest sponsored by a hotel in Los Angeles and gained early acting experience at the Pasadena Community Playhouse. She began using the name Templeton Fox, Templeton being her mother's maiden name, after being advised by a numerologist to do so.

== Career ==
=== Radio ===
Before Fox became an actress, she was a singer in Los Angeles. After her parents moved to Chicago, they challenged her to audition with NBC, which resulted in her gaining a contract as a dramatic actress on that network in September 1935. Her roles on radio programs included those shown in the table below.

Program	Character
Dan Harding's Wife	Margot Graham
Hilltop House	Trudy Reynolds
Kate Hopkins, Angel of Mercy	Trudy
Linda Fairchild, Stepmother	Linda Fairchild
The Story of Mary Marlin	Bunny Mitchell
This Day Is Ours	Eleanor MacDonald
Those We Love	Ann
Young Hickory	Marilyn Fletcher
Your Family and Mine	Claudia Foster

Programs on which Fox had supporting roles included Manhattan at Midnight, Lights Out and The Mystery Man.

=== Film ===
Fox worked at Metro-Goldwyn-Mayer, mostly in bit parts. Her film credits include Tony Rome, Fate Is the Hunter, Hush… Hush, Sweet Charlotte, Who's Been Sleeping in My Bed?, and Shock Treatment.

=== Stage ===
In 1942, Fox portrayed Miriam Blake in a production of Guest in the House in Boston.

=== Television ===
Fox's television appearances include roles in Hazel, Route 66, Dennis the Menace, The Thin Man, My Three Sons, Slattery's People, Gentle Ben, My Living Doll, and Peyton Place. In 1975, she was a last-minute replacement to play Ralph Kramden's mother-in-law on the 25th anniversary episode of The Honeymooners after Doro Merande, the actress slated for that role, died suddenly.

== Personal life ==
Fox married Robert Lyon Welch (1910 – 1964), a radio advertising executive who later became a film producer for Paramount Pictures, on August 15, 1938, in New York City, New York. She and Welch had a son, Robert "Bob" Welch (1945 – 2012), a musician and early member of Fleetwood Mac, and a daughter. They remained married until his death in 1964. She married William Reid McLeod (1913 – 2005) on August 6, 1970, in Miami, Florida.

Fox died on January 9, 1993, in Los Angeles, California.
