= Laurens Hammond =

American engineer and inventor (1895–1973)

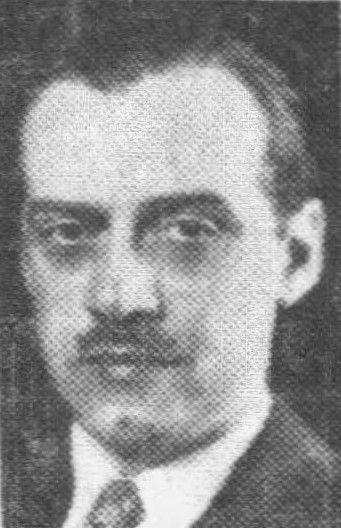
- Laurens Hammond in 1940
- Born: January 11, 1895; Evanston, Illinois
- Died: July 1, 1973 (aged 78); Cornwall, Connecticut
- Education: Cornell University
- Spouse: Roxana Scoville
- Parent(s): William Andrew and Idea Louise Strong Hammond
- Engineering career
- Discipline: Mechanical engineering
- Projects: Hammond organ, Hammond clock
- Awards: John Price Wetherill Medal

Laurens Hammond (January 11, 1895 – July 1, 1973) was an American engineer and inventor. His inventions include the Hammond organ, the Hammond clock, and the world's first polyphonic musical synthesizer, the Novachord.

== Youth ==
Laurens Hammond was born in Evanston, Illinois, on January 11, 1895 to William Andrew Hammond and Idea Louise Strong. Laurens showed his great technical prowess from an early age. His father, William, took his own life in January 1897, ostensibly due to failure of the First National Bank of Illinois, which he had founded. Upon her husband's death, Idea, who was an artist, relocated to France with Laurens to further her studies, and the family spent the next eleven years in France and Germany.

== Early inventions ==
When the family returned to Evanston in 1909, Laurens, then 14, was fluent in French and German. While in Europe, he had already designed a system for automatic transmission for automobiles. At his mother's suggestion, he submitted his designs to engineers at French automaker Renault, although they were not accepted. His first patent, in 1912, was for a barometer that could sell for one dollar.

== University and military service ==
Hammond studied mechanical engineering at Cornell University, and was a member of the Delta Upsilon fraternity. He graduated with honors in 1916. When the United States entered World War I, Hammond served with the 16th Regiment Engineers (Railway), American Expeditionary Force, in France. He rose to the rank of captain.

== Inventions ==
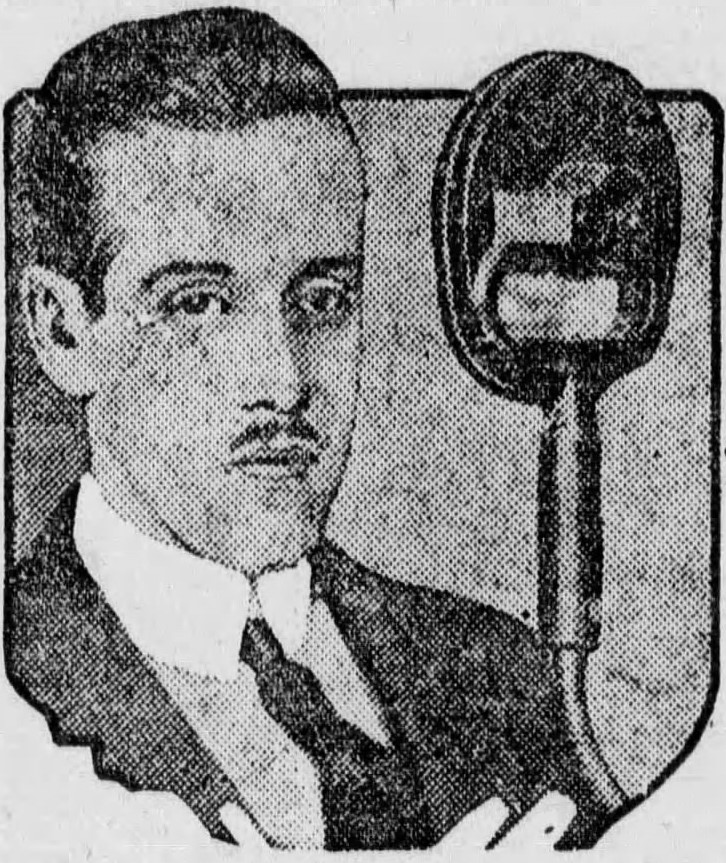
Hammond with his invention the Teleview, in 1923

Following the war, Hammond moved to Detroit, where he was chief engineer for the Gray Motor Company, a manufacturer of marine engines. A partner in the company, Col. John H. Poole, with whom he had served in France, knew of his engineering skills, and paid him an extra $300 a week under the table to stay with Gray Motor. In 1919, he invented a silent spring-driven clock. This invention brought him enough money to leave Gray Motor Company and rent his own space in New York City.

In 1922, Hammond invented the Teleview system of shutter glasses in association with 3-D films. One feature was made for the system, The Man from M.A.R.S.. He premiered this show at the Selwyn Theatre in New York in December 1922 to critical acclaim, but the cost of installing the expensive machinery in the theater was prohibitive, and the process was never used again. A 2-D version of the film, renamed Radio-Mania, continued to screen.

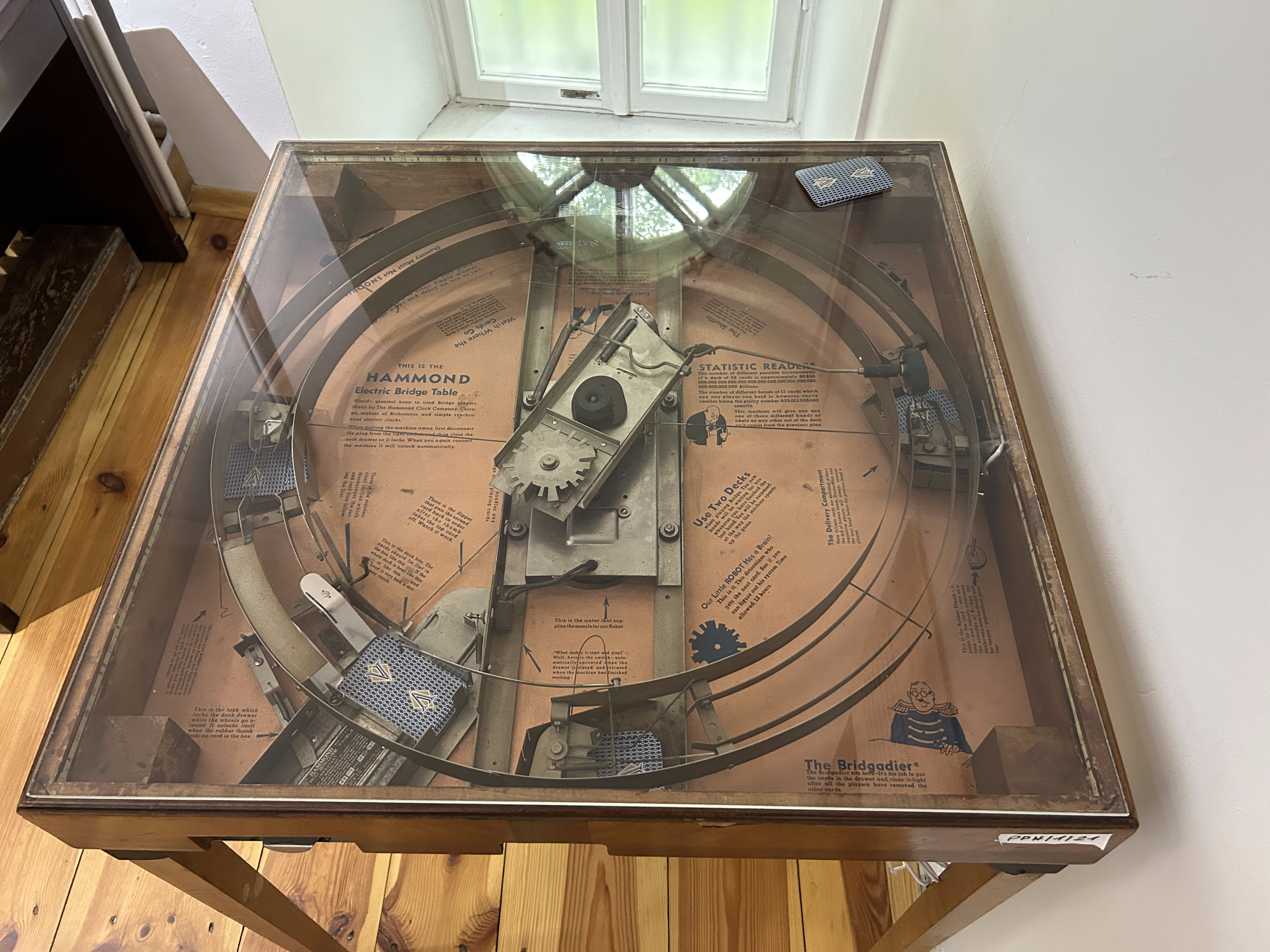
Hammond Electric Bridge Table (Muzeum Hammonda in Kielce, Poland)

Hammond's work on the synchronous motor led him in 1928 to set up the Hammond Clock Company, with six workers, above a grocery store in Chicago. Demand was high and the business soon grew into a large factory. He was responsible for a number of other inventions, such as an electric bridge table. A mechanism below the $25 table's surface shuffled the cards and dealt them to each of the four players.

In 1933, Hammond bought a used piano, and discarded everything apart from the keyboard action. Using the keyboard as a controller, he experimented with different sound-generating methods, finally settling on one, the tonewheel generator. The company's assistant treasurer, W. L. Lahey, was the organist at the nearby St. Christopher's Episcopal Church, and Hammond consulted him concerning the quality of the new instrument's sound. Thanks to Hammond's prior manufacturing and engineering experience, the tonewheel generator was extremely well-engineered by the time the "Hammond Organ" finally went into production in 1935. Tonewheel organs are still in regular use in the twenty-first century, which is a testament to the quality of the design and execution of the product.

Hammond filed his patent application on January 19, 1934. At that time, unemployment was a major problem due to the Great Depression, and with this in mind, the Patent Office rushed to grant his application, with the hope of creating jobs in the area.

Hammond was awarded the Franklin Institute's John Price Wetherill Medal in 1940 for the invention of the Hammond electric organ.

== Later life and death ==
Hammond left his position as president of his company in 1955, and retired from the company in 1960, at the age of sixty-five. During his life he held 91 patents. He was married to Roxana Scoville, and had one daughter. He died in Cornwall, Connecticut on July 1, 1973, aged 78.

In 2017 the Laurens Hammond Museum was founded in Kielce, Poland as a division of the Museum of Toys and Play.
