= Irene Ryan =

American actress (1902–1973)

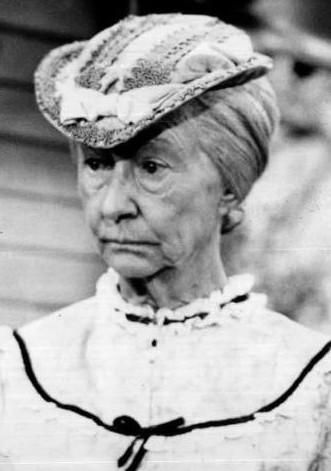
- Ryan on The Beverly Hillbillies, 1968
- Born: Irene Noblitt; October 17, 1902; El Paso, Texas, U.S.
- Died: April 26, 1973 (aged 70); Santa Monica, California, U.S.
- Resting place: Woodlawn Memorial Cemetery, Santa Monica
- Occupations: Actress; comedian
- Years active: 1913–1973
- Spouses: Tim Ryan (m. 1922; div. 1942) Harold E. Knox (m. 1946; div. 1961)

Irene Ryan (born Irene Noblitt; October 17, 1902 – April 26, 1973) was an American actress and comedienne active in vaudeville, radio, film, television, and Broadway and widely known for her portrayal of Daisy May "Granny" Moses, mother-in-law of Buddy Ebsen's character Jed Clampett on the long-running TV series The Beverly Hillbillies (1962–1971). She was nominated for Emmy Awards for Outstanding Lead Actress in a Comedy Series in 1963 and 1964 for the role.

== Early years ==
Ryan was born Irene Noblitt on October 17, 1902, in El Paso, Texas, the second child and daughter of Catherine J. "Katie" (née McSharry, 1863–1931) and James Merritt Noblitt (1856–1913). Her father was an army sergeant from North Carolina, and her mother had emigrated from Ireland. When Irene was born, her sister Anna was already 17 years old (1885–1966).

== Career ==
Ryan began her performing career at age 11, when she won $3 (equal to $100.09 today) for singing "Pretty Baby" in an amateur contest at the Valencia Theater in San Francisco.

At 20, she married writer-comedian Tim Ryan. They performed in vaudeville as a double act, known in show business as a "Dumb Dora" routine, and epitomized by George Burns and Gracie Allen. Known professionally as "Tim and Irene" (and billed formally as Tim Ryan and Irene Noblette), they starred in 11 short comedies for Educational Pictures between 1935 and 1937. The films were usually vehicles for their vaudevillian dialogue, with Irene as the flighty young woman who drives Tim to distraction. Tim's frequent admonition, "Will you stop?", became a catchphrase and then the title of one of their shorts. Substituting for Jack Benny in 1936, they starred in The Jell-O Summer Show on NBC's Red Network.

The Ryans had no children and divorced in 1942, although Irene kept the surname. She toured with Bob Hope, and was on his radio program for two years. She played Edgar Kennedy's wife in two of his RKO short films in 1943. That same year, she appeared in the country music film O, My Darling Clementine.

By 1943, Tim Ryan had become a prolific character actor in movies; Monogram Pictures reunited Tim and Irene for four feature films, the last being the 1944 musical feature Hot Rhythm with Dona Drake.

In 1946, Irene Ryan married Harold E. Knox, who worked in film production. After 15 years, Ryan and Knox divorced in 1961. She continued to work in motion pictures into the late 1940s and early 1950s, generally playing fussy or nervous women. In 1946, Ryan joined the cast of The Jack Carson Show on CBS Radio, playing "a neighborhood storekeeper who operates a combination candy shop and lending library." In January 1955, Ryan made her first television sitcom appearance in an episode of the CBS series The Danny Thomas Show. She appeared with Walter Brennan in the 1959 episode "Grandpa's New Job" on the ABC sitcom The Real McCoys. In the 1960-1961 CBS sitcom Bringing Up Buddy, starring Frank Aletter, Ryan was cast in three episodes as Cynthia Boyle, and she appeared as Rusty Wallace in "The Romance of Silver Pines", a 1962 episode of My Three Sons, starring Fred MacMurray. Ryan guest-starred as Ellie McCabe in "The Old Stowe Road," a 1962 episode of the CBS sitcom Ichabod and Me. In 1966, she was a contestant/celebrity guest star on the game show Password.

=== The Beverly Hillbillies ===
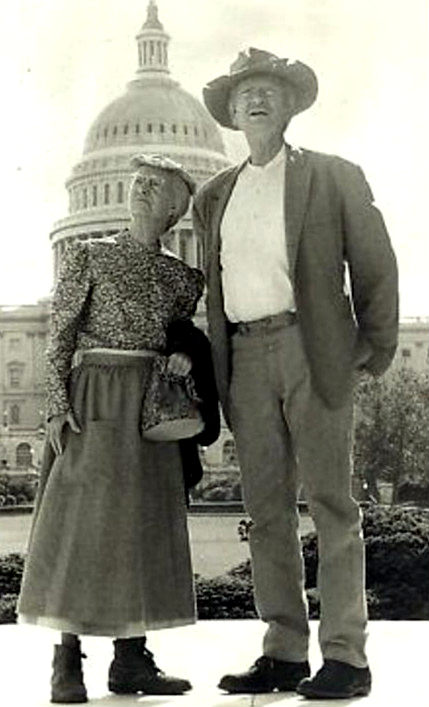
Irene Ryan and Buddy Ebsen in the Beverly Hillbillies episode "The Clampetts in Washington", 1970

In 1962, Ryan was cast in what was to be her best-known role as Daisy "Granny" Moses, mother-in-law of patriarch Jed Clampett, in The Beverly Hillbillies (although Ryan was only five and a half years older than Ebsen, the actor playing Clampett). The character was named in honor of the artist Anna Mary Robertson "Grandma" Moses, who had died at age 101 the previous year.

According to Filmways publicist Ted Switzer, series creator and producer Paul Henning had decided to cast Bea Benaderet as Granny, but when Ryan read for the role "with her hair tied back in a bun and feisty as all get-out," everyone was taken with her performance. Executive producer Al Simon and Henning immediately said, "That's Granny!" Later, when Benaderet saw Ryan's audition, she agreed. Benaderet was cast as Jed Clampett's cousin, Pearl Bodine.

In 1966, Ryan played Granny in the comedy Don't Worry, We'll Think of a Title, co-starring Rose Marie and Morey Amsterdam.

== Stage ==
In 1972, Ryan starred as Berthe in the Bob Fosse–directed Broadway musical Pippin, in which she sang the number "No Time at All." A live recording (sound with still photographs) was made.

== Club ==
In 1965, Ryan signed a two-year contract to perform at the Sahara Hotel in Las Vegas, Nevada.

== Recognition ==
In both 1963 and 1964, Ryan was nominated for an Emmy Award for Outstanding Continued Performance by an Actress in a Series (Lead).

Ryan was nominated for Broadway's 1973 Tony Award as Best Supporting or Featured Actress (Musical) for her performance in Pippin. She lost to Patricia Elliott (A Little Night Music) in a ceremony held about a month before Ryan's death.

== Death ==
On March 10, 1973, Ryan suffered an apparent stroke during a performance of Pippin, flew home to California on her doctor's orders, and was hospitalized. She was diagnosed with an inoperable glioblastoma (malignant brain tumor). Ryan died at St. John's Hospital, Santa Monica, California, on April 26, 1973, aged 70. The causes of death were given as glioblastoma and arteriosclerotic heart disease. Her body was interred in a mausoleum at the Woodlawn Memorial Cemetery in Santa Monica beside her sister, Anna Thompson.

== Legacy and charitable causes ==
The Irene Ryan Acting Scholarship awards scholarships to outstanding actors who participate in the American College Theatre Festival. The scholarship provides "recognition, honor, and financial assistance to outstanding student performers wishing to pursue further education." These scholarships have been awarded by the Irene Ryan Foundation since 1972.

== Selected filmography ==
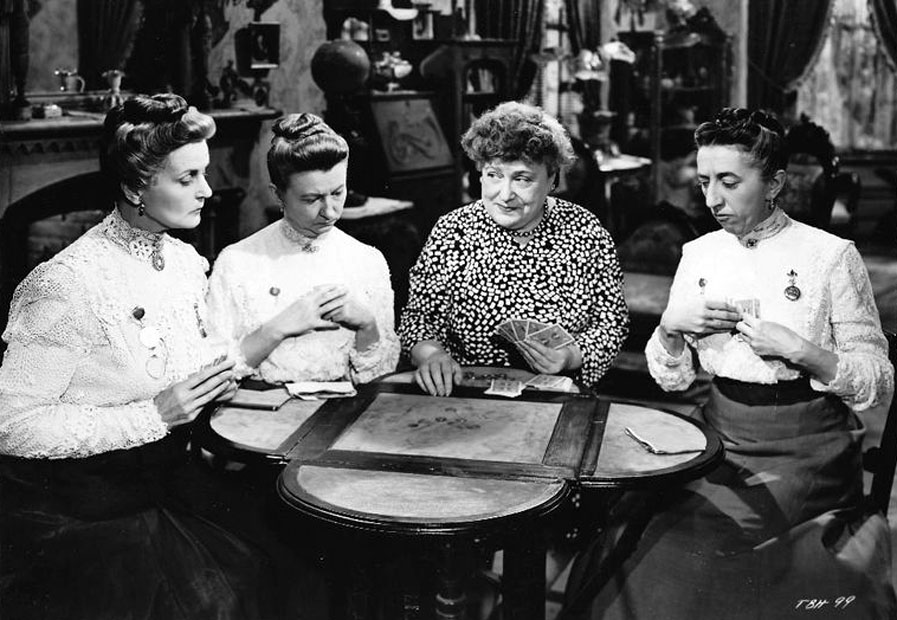
L-R: Moyna Macgill, Irene Ryan, Florence Bates, and Margaret Hamilton in Texas, Brooklyn & Heaven (1948)

- Melody for Three (1941) - Mrs. Veronica Higby (uncredited)
- Reveille with Beverly (1943) - Elsie (uncredited)
- Melody Parade (1943) - Gloria Brewster
- The Sultan's Daughter (1943) - Irene
- O, My Darling Clementine (1943) - Irene
- Hot Rhythm (1944) - Polly Kane
- San Diego, I Love You (1944) - Sheila Jones
- That's the Spirit (1945) - Bilson
- The Beautiful Cheat (1945) - Miss Beatrice Kent
- That Night with You (1945) - Prudence
- Diary of a Chambermaid (1946) - Louise
- Little Iodine (1946) - Mrs. Tremble
- The Woman on the Beach (1947) - Mrs. Wernecke
- Heading for Heaven (1947) - Molly the Maid
- Arch of Triumph (1948) - Irate Wife (uncredited)
- Texas, Brooklyn & Heaven (1948) - Opal Cheever
- My Dear Secretary (1948) - Mary
- Mighty Joe Young (1949) - Southern Belle at the Bar (uncredited)
- The Skipper Surprised His Wife (1950) - Mrs. O'Rourke (uncredited)
- Half Angel (1951) - Nurse Kay
- Meet Me After the Show (1951) - Tillie, Delilah's Maid
- Bonzo Goes to College (1952) - Nancy
- The WAC from Walla Walla (1952) - WAC Sgt. Kearns
- Blackbeard the Pirate (1952) - Alvina - Lady in Waiting
- Ricochet Romance (1954) - Miss Clay
- Spring Reunion (1957) - Miss Stapleton
- Rockabilly Baby (1957) - Eunice Johnson
- Desire in the Dust (1960) - Nora Finney
- Don't Worry, We'll Think of a Title (1966) - Granny (uncredited)
