= Isabel Randolph =

American character actress (1889–1973)

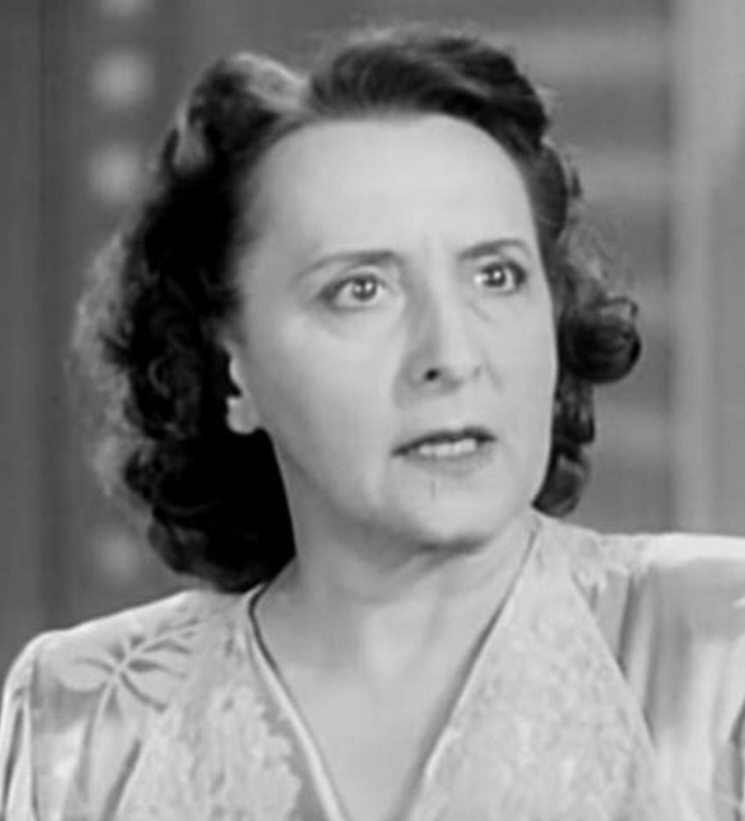
- Randolph in The Missing Corpse (1945)
- Born: Isabelle Elfreda Mair; December 4, 1889; Chicago, Illinois, U.S.
- Died: January 11, 1973 (aged 83); Burbank, California, U.S.
- Resting place: California
- Occupation: Actress
- Years active: 1910–1966
- Spouse: John Charles Ryan (m. 1917; died 1934)
- Children: 2

Isabel Randolph (born Isabelle Elfreda Mair; December 4, 1889 – January 11, 1973) was an American character actress in radio and film from the 1940s through the 1960s and in television from the early 1950s to the middle 1960s.

== Early life ==
Born in Chicago, the daughter of Alexander Mair and May Franklin, Randolph later cited Chicago's Randolph Street as the inspiration for her stage name.

== Career ==
=== Theater ===
Randolph acted in regional theater all over the American Midwest, from the pre-World War I era up to the start of her radio career in the mid-1930s. She became leading lady at the Princess Theater in Des Moines, Iowa in 1917 and was still acting there in 1918, and, in 1931, at the Loyola Community Theater in Chicago. On Broadway, Randolph portrayed Mrs. Pembrook in If I Was Rich (1926) and Henrietta Scott in Ink (1927).

=== Radio ===
Isabel Randolph gained nationwide popularity on the radio show Fibber McGee and Molly (on the air 1935–1959), where she began in various "snooty" roles January 13, 1936, eventually becoming a long-running series character, the pompous Mrs. Abigail Uppington, a snooty society matron whom Fibber addressed as "Uppy," and whose pretensions Fibber delighted in deflating. She stayed with the comedy series for seven years until the show began its eighth season in the fall of 1943.

She also starred as the wife in NBC's soap opera Dan Harding's Wife (on the air January 20, 1936 through February 10, 1939), and was in the cast of two other serials, One Man's Family and The Story of Mary Marlin.

=== Film ===
Even while young, Randolph specialized in middle-aged "grand dame" roles on stage and radio, continuing in these roles when she entered films in 1940. She re-created her character of Mrs. Uppington in RKO's Look Who's Laughing in 1941 and Here We Go Again in 1942, both spin-offs of the Fibber McGee and Molly radio series. In 1943, she co-starred in the Republic musical O, My Darling Clementine.

She worked in more than a few 1940s films with Lucille Ball. Randolph also was prominently featured in Hoosier Holiday, a 1945 movie from Republic Pictures. She played many small roles in major pictures, and starred in major (though stereotypical) roles in B-pictures — though, in at least one Republic Studios western of the early 1950s (Thundering Caravans, one of the Sheriff Rocky Lane film series), she was cast against type as an evil criminal mastermind.

=== Television ===
In her television career from 1951 to 1966, Isabel appeared most often on comedies, with an occasional drama (such as Perry Mason). She was a member of the cast of The Jerry Colonna Show on ABC in 1951. Her first role on television was a protagonist on the 1951 version of Dick Tracy She played the recurring character of neighbor Mrs. Boone in Meet Millie, one of the first of the sitcom hits for CBS in 1954. She was seen as private-school proprietress Mrs. Nestor during the final (1955–1956) season of Our Miss Brooks. She was also a regular comedic actor in 1952 on The Abbott and Costello Show, and from 1957–1962 on The Red Skelton Show.

Randolph appeared in The Tom Ewell Show episode "Storm Over Shangri-La" in 1961 and in The Andy Griffith Show episodes "A Plaque for Mayberry" in 1961 and "Rafe Hollister Sings" in 1963. One of her last appearances on television was in 1966 in her recurring role as Clara Petrie, the mother of Rob (Dick Van Dyke) on The Dick Van Dyke Show. Later that year she concluded her television career when she played the role of Madam Rosa Bruening in the Perry Mason episode "The Case of the Misguided Model."

== Personal life and death ==
From August 22, 1917 until his death in May 1934, Randolph was married to John Charles Ryan, with whom she had two daughters.

On January 11, 1973, following a lengthy illness, she died in Burbank, California, survived by both daughters.

== Selected filmography ==
Randolph worked on over seventy films from 1939 to 1959. Among them were:

- The Women (1939) as Woman in Cabinet (uncredited)
- Barnyard Follies (1940) as Mrs. Uppington
- The Corsican Brothers (1941) as Countess Isabelle's Mother (uncredited)
- Look Who's Laughing (1941) as Mrs. Uppington
- Here We Go Again (1942) as Mrs. Uppington
- Take a Letter, Darling (1942) as Mrs. French (uncredited)
- My Favorite Blonde (1942) as Frederick's Mother (uncredited)
- Henry Aldrich Gets Glamour (1943) as Mrs. Stacey (uncredited)
- Shadow of a Doubt (1943) as Mrs. Margaret Green (uncredited)
- O, My Darling Clementine (1943) as Mrs. Uppington
- The Missing Corpse (1945) as Alice Kruger
- Hoosier Holiday (1945) as Abigail Fairchild
- Our Hearts Were Growing Up (1946) as Mrs. Southworth
- Little Women (1949) as Mrs. Gardiner (uncredited)
- The Fuller Brush Girl (1950) as bridge player Mrs. Annabel South (uncredited)
- Secrets of Monte Carlo (1951) as Mrs. Gussy
- The Shanghai Story (1954) as Mrs. Merryweather
- You're Never Too Young (1955)
- Hot Shots (1956) as Mrs. Taylor
- It Started with a Kiss (1959) as Mrs. Chalmers (uncredited)
- Perry Mason (1960 TV series) S3E20 "The Case of the Crying Cherub" as woman artist
