= The Beautiful Cheat (1945 film) =

- Theatrical release poster
- Directed by: Charles Barton
- Screenplay by: Ben Markson; Elwood Ullman
- Story by: Manuel Seff; Fritz Rotter
- Produced by: Charles Barton
- Starring: Bonita Granville; Noah Beery Jr. Margaret Irving; Sarah Selby; Irene Ryan; Carol Hughes; Tom Dillon
- Cinematography: Elwood Bredell
- Edited by: Ray Snyder
- Production company: Universal Pictures
- Distributed by: Universal Pictures
- Release date: July 20, 1945
- Running time: 59 minutes
- Country: United States
- Language: English

The Beautiful Cheat is a 1945 American comedy film directed by Charles Barton and written by Ben Markson and Elwood Ullman. The film stars Bonita Granville, Noah Beery Jr., Margaret Irving, Sarah Selby, Irene Ryan, Carol Hughes and Tom Dillon. The film was released on July 20, 1945, by Universal Pictures.

== Plot ==
A sociologist sends his friend, a psychologist, to a local detention center to obtain a delinquent teenager for the sociologist to study for a book he is writing. When the psychologist is unable to get a teenager released to his custody, he convinces a secretary to pose as one. The fake delinquent causes chaos in the sociologist's life and home.

== Cast ==
- Bonita Granville as Alice
- Noah Beery Jr. as Prof. Alexander Haven
- Margaret Irving as Olympia Haven
- Sarah Selby as Athene Haven
- Irene Ryan as Miss Beatrice Kent
- Carol Hughes as Dolly Marsh
- Milburn Stone as Lucius Haven
- Tom Dillon as Cassidy
- Edward Gargan as Manager
- Lester Matthews as Farley
- Edward Fielding as Dr. Horace Pennypacker
- Tommy Bond as Jimmy
