= Griff Barnett =

American actor (1884–1958)

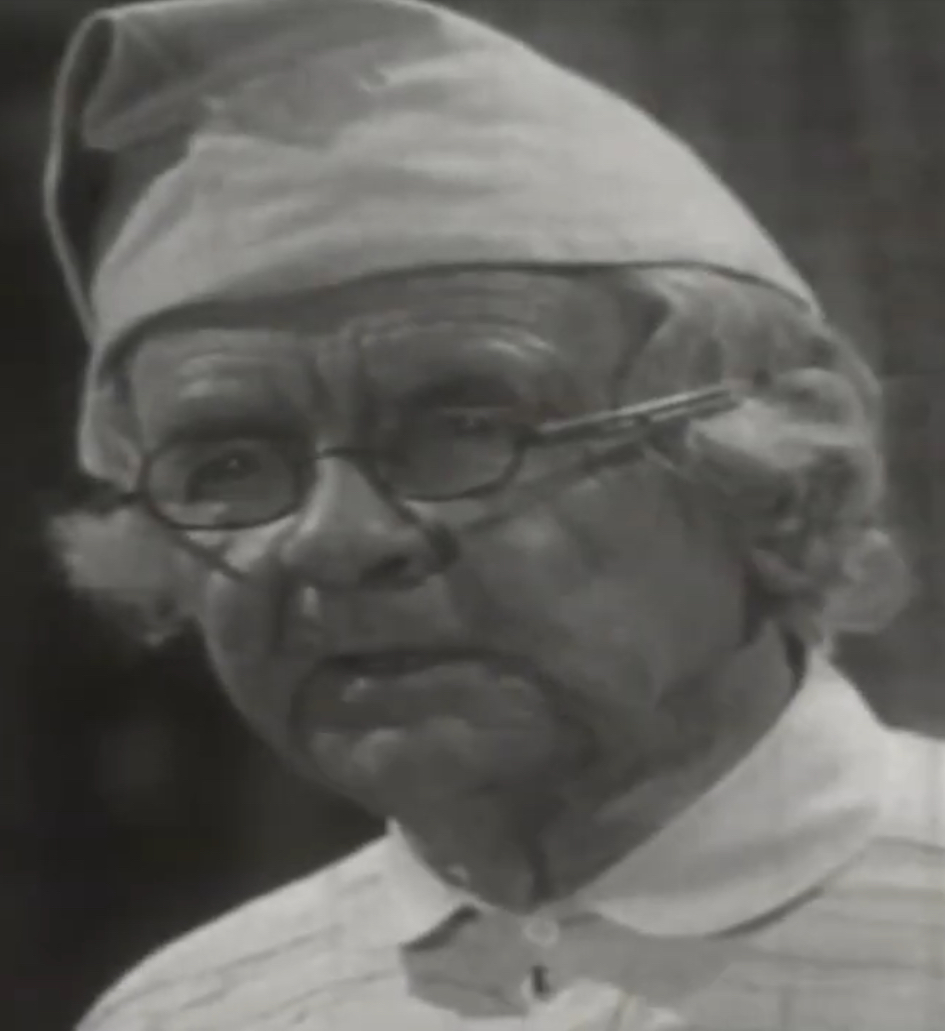
- Barnett in an episode of Cavalcade of America (1955)
- Born: November 12, 1884; Blue Ridge, Texas, U.S.
- Died: January 12, 1958 (aged 73); El Monte, California, U.S.
- Resting place: Rose Hills Memorial Park, Whittier, California
- Occupation: Actor

Griff Barnett (born Manley Griffith, November 12, 1884 – January 12, 1958) was an American actor.

Barnett was born in Blue Ridge, Texas in 1884. In the early 20th century, Barnett was a member of the Mack-Hillard stock theater company in Wichita, Kansas. He also worked with stock theater companies in the Chicago area.

He played the role of the Rexall family druggist in commercials on The Phil Harris-Alice Faye Show on radio in the late 1940s and early 1950s. He also appeared in numerous films from the 1930s through the 1950s, including To Each His Own (1946), Apartment for Peggy (1948), and Pinky (1949). He frequently played doctors or lawyers. In 1954, he appeared in episode 131 of the TV series, The Lone Ranger.

== Death ==
Barnett died of pneumonia and heart trouble at home in El Monte, California, on January 12, 1958, aged 73. He is buried in Rose Hills Memorial Park in Whittier, California.

== Selected filmography ==
- The Lone Ranger (1938, Serial) - Rancher (uncredited)
- Santa Fe Stampede (1938) - Townsman Henry Jones (uncredited)
- The Lone Ranger Rides Again (1939, Serial) - E.B. Tully (Ch. 6) (uncredited)
- Those High Grey Walls (1939) - Prison Tailor (uncredited)
- The Shadow (1940, Serial) - Stephen Prescott (uncredited)
- Frontier Vengeance (1940) - Joel Hunter
- Arizona (1940) - Sam Hughes
- The Lady from Cheyenne (1941) - Cork Supporter (uncredited)
- Bachelor Daddy (1941) - Bailiff (uncredited)
- Gangs of Sonora (1941) - Man on Stagecoach (uncredited)
- Outlaws of Cherokee Trail (1941) - Jury Foreman (uncredited)
- Death Valley Outlaws (1941) - Train Agent (uncredited)
- A Missouri Outlaw (1941) - Man with Ward (uncredited)
- Dick Tracy vs. Crime, Inc. (1941, Serial) - Plant Watchman (uncredited)
- Stardust on the Sage (1942) - Larkin (uncredited)
- The Sombrero Kid (1942) - Townsman (uncredited)
- Shadows on the Sage (1942) - Steve Jackson
- The Story of Dr. Wassell (1944) - 'Janssen' Passenger (uncredited)
- Wilson (1944) - Reporter (uncredited)
- Strange Holiday (1945) - Regan
- To Each His Own (1946) - Daniel Norris
- Without Reservations (1946) - Train Conductor (uncredited)
- Danger Woman (1946) - Dr. George Carey
- Duel in the Sun (1946) - The Bordertown Jailer (uncredited)
- The Arnelo Affair (1947) - Mr. Adams (uncredited)
- Suddenly It's Spring (1947) - Conductor on Train (uncredited)
- The Michigan Kid (1947) - Prentiss Dawson
- The Millerson Case (1947) - Doc Sam Millerson
- Possessed (1947) - Coroner
- Stepchild (1947) - Burns
- Gunfighters (1947) - Mr. Banner
- The Son of Rusty (1947) - Judge (uncredited)
- Unconquered (1947) - Brother Andrews - of Pennsylvania
- Wild Harvest (1947) - Rankin
- Magic Town (1947) - Henry - Stringer's Office (uncredited)
- Cass Timberlane (1947) - Herman, the Butler
- The Gangster (1947) - Dorothy's Father (uncredited)
- Daisy Kenyon (1947) - Will Thompson (uncredited)
- The Tender Years (1948) - Sen. Cooper
- Arch of Triumph (1948) - Fernand (uncredited)
- Saigon (1948) - Surgeon
- Fury at Furnace Creek (1948) - Appleby
- Fighting Father Dunne (1948) - Governor
- Tap Roots (1948) - Dr. MacIntosh
- The Walls of Jericho (1948) - Judge Hutto
- For the Love of Mary (1948) - Timothy Peppertree
- Apartment for Peggy (1948) - Dr. Philip Conway
- Criss Cross (1949) - Pop
- Mother Is a Freshman (1949) - Dean Gillingham
- The Doolins of Oklahoma (1949) - Deacon Burton
- The Fountainhead (1949) - Judge (uncredited)
- Any Number Can Play (1949) - Police Desk Sergeant (uncredited)
- Pinky (1949) - Dr. Joseph 'Doc Joe' McGill
- Holiday Affair (1949) - Mr. Ennis
- No Man of Her Own (1950) - Dr. Parker
- Sierra (1950) - Dr. Hank Robbins
- Customs Agent (1950) - Charles McGraw
- Peggy (1950) - Dr. Philip Wilcox
- Convicted (1950) - Mr. Hufford (uncredited)
- When I Grow Up (1951) - Dr. Bailey
- Home Town Story (1951) - Uncle Cliff
- Two of a Kind (1951) - William McIntyre
- Passage West (1951) - Papa Emil Ludwig
- Cattle Drive (1951) - Conductor O'Hara
- Scandal Sheet (1952) - Judge Elroy Hacker
- The Treasure of Lost Canyon (1952) - Judge Wade
- The Marrying Kind (1952) - Charley
- The Sellout (1952) - J.R. Morrison
- The Adventures of Superman (1952)
- The Duel at Silver Creek (1952) - Dan 'Pop' Muzik (uncredited)
- Angel Face (1953) - The Judge
- The Court-Martial of Billy Mitchell (1955) - George Carlson (uncredited)
- The Spirit of St. Louis (1957) - Dad (Farmer) (uncredited) (final film role)
