= Jesse James, Jr. (film) =

1942 film by George Sherman

- Theatrical release poster
- Directed by: George Sherman
- Screenplay by: Richard Murphy; Doris Schroeder; Taylor Caven
- Story by: Richard Murphy
- Produced by: George Sherman
- Starring: Don "Red" Barry; Lynn Merrick; Al St. John; Douglas Walton; Karl Hackett; Lee Shumway
- Cinematography: John MacBurnie
- Edited by: William P. Thompson
- Music by: Cy Feuer
- Production company: Republic Pictures
- Distributed by: Republic Pictures
- Release date: March 25, 1942
- Running time: 56 minutes
- Country: United States
- Language: English

Jesse James, Jr. is a 1942 American Western film directed by George Sherman and written by Richard Murphy, Doris Schroeder and Taylor Caven. The film stars Don "Red" Barry, Lynn Merrick, Al St. John, Douglas Walton, Karl Hackett and Lee Shumway. The film was released on March 25, 1942, by Republic Pictures.

== Cast ==
- Don "Red" Barry as Johnny Barrett
- Lynn Merrick as Joan Perry
- Al St. John as Pop Sawyer
- Douglas Walton as Archie McDonald
- Karl Hackett as Amos Martin
- Lee Shumway as Banker Tom Perry
- Stanley Blystone as Sam Carson
- Jack Kirk as Sheriff
