= Outlaws of Sonora =

1938 film

- Film poster
- Directed by: George Sherman
- Written by: William Colt MacDonald; Betty Burbridge; Edmond Kelso
- Produced by: William Berke
- Starring: Bob Livingston; Ray Corrigan; Max Terhune
- Cinematography: William Nobles
- Edited by: Tony Martinelli
- Music by: Alberto Colombo
- Distributed by: Republic Pictures
- Release date: April 14, 1938
- Running time: 55 minutes
- Country: United States
- Language: English

Outlaws of Sonora is a 1938 American Western "Three Mesquiteers" B-movie directed by George Sherman. It stars Bob Livingston, Ray Corrigan and Max Terhune. Livingston has a dual role as Mesquiteer Stony Brooke and his outlaw doppelgänger Dude Brannen. Films in the Mesquiteer series are normally considered traditional Westerns but Outlaws of Sonora is an exception; it has a revisionist theme as an early example of the Outlaw/Gunfighter sub-genre.

== Plot ==
Stony, Tucson and Lullaby are hired by the Mesquite County Cattleman's Association in Cactusville to collect a payroll from a bank in distant Red Rock. Stony is given the warrant and rides to Red Rock where Tucson and Lullaby are waiting. On the way, Stony is waylaid and captured by an outlaw gang led by Dude Brannen who is Stony's doppelgänger. Posing as Stony, Brannen goes to the bank to collect the payroll. The manager realises he is not Stony and Brannen shoots him. He takes the payroll and escapes as Tucson, Lullaby and the sheriff arrive to investigate the gunshot.

Notices are posted for Stony's arrest although his friends do not believe he has become an outlaw. Brannen decides to continue his duplicity and his gang carry out more robberies and murders. They become notorious as the Brooke Gang with Stony publicised as their leader. Having decided that the gang has made enough money to live well and go to Mexico, Brannen has the idea of plastic surgery done to end the resemblance. Stony will be handed over to the authorities and the gang will claim the reward money as bounty.

Stony manages to escape but is wounded in the shoulder as he rides away. He eludes his pursuers and makes his way to the remote cabin where the Mesquiteers are based. Believing his story, Tucson and Lullaby have to hide him when a posse arrives. All three ride to another hideout but Stony's wound has made him ill and the others fetch Doc Martin from Red Rock. Doc removes the bullet from Stony's shoulder and dresses the wound. He orders a reluctant Stony to rest and recuperate. Doc returns to his surgery in Red Rock but is then kidnapped by two of Brannen's gang. Thinking quickly, Doc tells them he will need a prescription done before he can perform the operation on Brannen. He writes it in Latin and one of the outlaws takes the note to the chemist while the other takes Doc to a saloon where he will meet Brannen and operate. The chemist reads the prescription and sees it is in fact a secret message. After alerting the sheriff, he gives the outlaw a fake prescription. The outlaw leaves and the posse follow him.

Tucson and Lullaby are in the saloon and see Doc being brought in. Then, to their surprise, a man comes in who is a dead ringer for Stony. They assume at first that this must be Brannen but then realise it is Stony himself, now posing as Brannen to try and rescue Doc. More arrivals are Brannen himself, the outlaw with the prescription and the sheriff with his posse. A fracas begins and all the outlaws are captured except Brannen who manages to reach his horse with Stony in pursuit. Stony takes a short cut to ambush him and the gang are all locked up. Doc is praised for his initiative and the Mesquiteers deliver the payroll to their employers.

== Cast ==
- Bob Livingston as Stony Brooke / Dude Brannen
- Ray Corrigan as Tucson Smith
- Max Terhune as Lullaby Joslin
- Jack Mulhall as Dr George Martin
- Otis Harlan as Pool player
- Jean Joyce as Miss McCoy, Secretary
- Sterlita Peluffo as Rosita (as Stelita Peluffo)
- Tom London as Sheriff Trask
- Gloria Rich as Stony's friend
- Edwin Mordant as Banker Pierce
- Ralph Peters as Henchman Gabby
- George Chesebro as Henchman Slim
- Frank LaRue as Coroner
- Jack Ingram as Henchman Nick
- Merrill McCormick as Henchman Pete
