= Texas Terrors =

1940 film

- Theatrical release poster
- Directed by: George Sherman
- Screenplay by: Doris Schroeder; Anthony Coldeway
- Produced by: George Sherman
- Starring: Don "Red" Barry; Julie Duncan; Arthur Loft; Al St. John; Eddy Waller; William Ruhl
- Cinematography: John MacBurnie
- Edited by: Tony Martinelli
- Production company: Republic Pictures
- Distributed by: Republic Pictures
- Release date: November 22, 1940
- Running time: 57 minutes
- Country: United States
- Language: English

Texas Terrors is a 1940 American Western film directed by George Sherman and written by Doris Schroeder and Anthony Coldeway. The film stars Don "Red" Barry, Julie Duncan, Arthur Loft, Al St. John, Eddy Waller and William Ruhl. It was released on November 22, 1940 by Republic Pictures.

== Cast ==
- Don "Red" Barry as Bob Millbourne aka Robert Mills
- Julie Duncan as Jane Bennett
- Arthur Loft as Olin Blake
- Al St. John as Frosty Larson
- Eddy Waller as Judge Charles Bennett
- William Ruhl as Henchman Ashley
- Ann Pennington as Dancer
- Sammy McKim as Bob as a Boy
- Reed Howes as Henchman Ed
- Robert Fiske as Defense Attorney Barker
- Fred Toones as Snowflake
