= The Kansas Terrors =

1939 film

- Film poster
- Directed by: George Sherman
- Written by: William Colt MacDonald; Betty Burbridge; Luci Ward; Jack Natteford
- Produced by: Harry Grey
- Starring: Robert Livingston; Raymond Hatton; Duncan Renaldo
- Cinematography: Ernest Miller
- Edited by: Tony Martinelli
- Distributed by: Republic Pictures
- Release date: October 6, 1939
- Running time: 57 minutes
- Country: United States
- Language: English

The Kansas Terrors is a 1939 American Western "Three Mesquiteers" B-movie directed by George Sherman.

== Cast ==
- Robert Livingston as Stony Brooke
- Raymond Hatton as Rusty Joslin
- Duncan Renaldo as Renaldo
- Julie Bishop as Maria del Montez (as Jacqueline Wells)
- Howard C. Hickman as Governor-General del Montez (as Howard Hickman)
- George Douglas as The Commandante
- Frank Lackteen as Captain Gonzales
- Myra Marsh as Maria's Duenna
- Yakima Canutt as The Sergeant
- Ruth Robinson as Juanita
- Richard Alexander as Nico
