= Kansas Cyclone =

1941 film by George Sherman

- Directed by: George Sherman
- Screenplay by: Oliver Drake; Doris Schroeder
- Story by: Louis Sarecky
- Produced by: George Sherman
- Starring: Don "Red" Barry; Lynn Merrick; William Haade; Milton Kibbee; Harry Worth; Dorothy Sebastian
- Cinematography: William Nobles
- Edited by: Charles Craft
- Music by: Paul Sawtell
- Production company: Republic Pictures
- Distributed by: Republic Pictures
- Release date: June 24, 1941
- Running time: 57 minutes
- Country: United States
- Language: English

Kansas Cyclone is a 1941 American Western film directed by George Sherman and written by Oliver Drake and Doris Schroeder. The film stars Don "Red" Barry, Lynn Merrick, William Haade, Milton Kibbee, Harry Worth and Dorothy Sebastian. The film was released on June 24, 1941, by Republic Pictures.

== Plot ==
Marshall and Geologist Jim Randall goes to investigate some ore robberies, he finds out that Parker is stealing ore from other miners and selling it as his own. Things go bad when Parker gets the mine owner killed and blames it on Jim.

== Cast ==
- Don "Red" Barry as Jim Randall
- Lynn Merrick as Martha King
- William Haade as Sheriff Ed King
- Milton Kibbee as Cal Chambers
- Harry J. Worth as Jud Parker
- Dorothy Sebastian as Helen King
- Jack Kirk as Turner
- Forrest Taylor as Ben Brown
- Charles R. Moore as T-Bone
