= Harry Worth =

Harry Worth is the name of:

- Harry Worth (actor, born 1903), British actor in the UK and Hollywood, mainly in film
- Harry Worth (actor, born 1917), British actor and comedian in the UK, mainly in television
