= Three Texas Steers =

1939 film

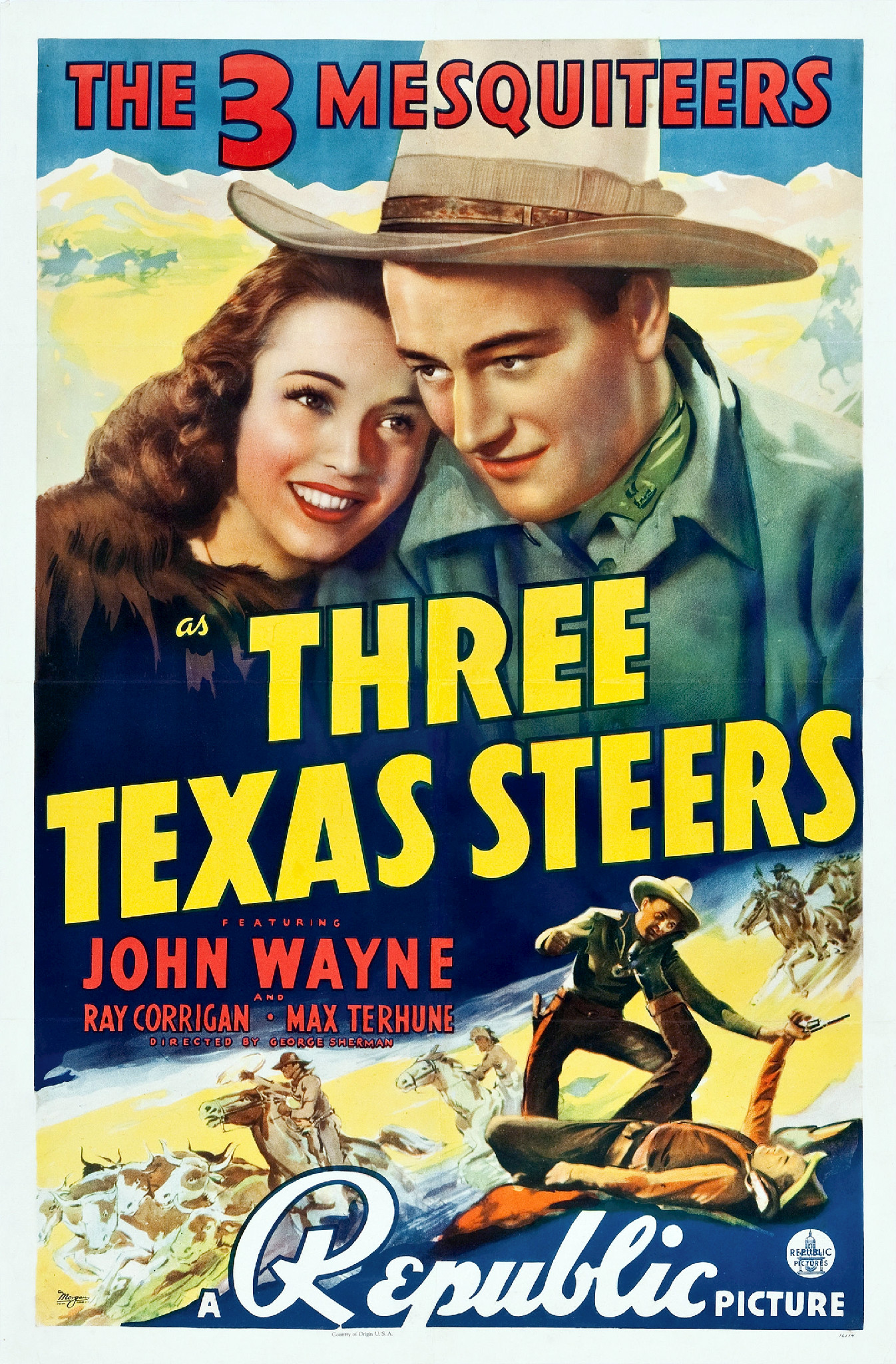
- Theatrical poster
- Directed by: George Sherman
- Written by: Stanley Roberts; Betty Burbridge
- Based on: Based on characters by William Colt MacDonald
- Produced by: William A. Berke
- Starring: John Wayne; Ray Corrigan; Max Terhune
- Cinematography: Ernest Miller
- Edited by: Tony Martinelli
- Music by: William Lava
- Distributed by: Republic Pictures
- Release date: May 12, 1939
- Running time: 56 minutes
- Country: United States
- Language: English

Three Texas Steers (UK title Danger Rides the Range) is a 1939 American "Three Mesquiteers" Western B-movie directed by George Sherman. It stars John Wayne, Ray "Crash" Corrigan and Max Terhune as the Mesquiteers; with Carole Landis as the female lead. Wayne played the lead in eight of the fifty-one films in the series.

== Plot ==
George Ward, the business manager of a small circus owned by Nancy Evans will stop at nothing to gain control of her valuable ranch. When Nancy continually refuses to sell, Ward's henchmen sabotage the circus. The Three Mesquiteers ride to the rescue.

== Cast ==
- John Wayne as Stony Brooke
- Ray "Crash" Corrigan as Tucson Smith and Willie the Gorilla
- Max Terhune as Lullaby Joslin
- Carole Landis as Nancy Evans
- Ralph Graves as George Ward
- Roscoe Ates as Sheriff Brown
- Collette Lyons as Lillian
- Billy Curtis as Hercules, the Midget
- Ted Adams as Henchman Steve
- Stanley Blystone as Henchman Rankin
- David Sharpe as Tony
- Ethan Laidlaw as Henchman Morgan
- Lew Kelly as Postman
- Ted Mapes as A Henchman (uncredited)
- John Merton as Mike Abbott (uncredited)

== See also ==
- John Wayne filmography
