= Stagecoach Express (film) =

1942 film by George Sherman

- Theatrical release poster
- Directed by: George Sherman
- Screenplay by: Arthur V. Jones
- Story by: Doris Schroeder
- Produced by: George Sherman
- Starring: Don "Red" Barry; Lynn Merrick; Al St. John; Robert Kent; Emmett Lynn; Guy Kingsford
- Cinematography: John MacBurnie
- Edited by: William P. Thompson
- Music by: Cy Feuer
- Production company: Republic Pictures
- Distributed by: Republic Pictures
- Release date: March 6, 1942
- Running time: 57 minutes
- Country: United States
- Language: English

Stagecoach Express is a 1942 American Western film directed by George Sherman and written by Arthur V. Jones. The film stars Don "Red" Barry, Lynn Merrick, Al St. John, Robert Kent, Emmett Lynn and Guy Kingsford. The film was released on March 6, 1942, by Republic Pictures.

== Cast ==
- Don "Red" Barry as Dave Gregory
- Lynn Merrick as Ellen Bristol
- Al St. John as Dusty Jenkins
- Robert Kent as Griff Williams
- Emmett Lynn as Charles Haney
- Guy Kingsford as Sam Elkins
- Ethan Laidlaw as Henchman Lou Hawkins
