= Bar 20 Rides Again =

1935 film by Howard Bretherton

- Theatrical release poster
- Directed by: Howard Bretherton
- Screenplay by: Gerald Geraghty; Doris Schroeder
- Produced by: Harry Sherman
- Starring: William Boyd; James Ellison; Jean Rouverol; George "Gabby" Hayes; Harry J. Worth; Frank McGlynn Jr. Howard Lang
- Cinematography: Archie Stout
- Edited by: Edward Schroeder
- Production company: Paramount Pictures
- Distributed by: Paramount Pictures
- Release date: December 6, 1935
- Running time: 61 minutes
- Country: United States
- Language: English

Bar 20 Rides Again is a 1935 American Western film directed by Howard Bretherton and written by Gerald Geraghty and Doris Schroeder. The film stars William Boyd, James Ellison, Jean Rouverol, George "Gabby" Hayes, Harry Worth, Frank McGlynn Jr. and Howard Lang. The film was released on December 6, 1935, by Paramount Pictures.

This is the third film in the Hopalong Cassidy series and the first in which George "Gabby" Hayes plays Cassidy's sidekick Windy (not yet "Gabby").

== Plot ==
Hoppy gets a letter from the father of Johnny's girlfriend asking for help against rustlers. He also asks Hoppy to bring Red, but not Johnny because Margaret is now enamoured with an Easterner. Johnny doesn't believe it and, without Hoppy's knowledge, he races off to marry Margaret. Hoppy and Red follow 3 hours behind to help the rancher against the rustler known as "Nevada".

== Cast ==
- William Boyd as Bill 'Hopalong' Cassidy
- James Ellison as Johnny Nelson
- Jean Rouverol as Margaret Arnold
- George "Gabby" Hayes as Windy
- Harry J. Worth as George Perdue
- Frank McGlynn Jr. as Red Connors
- Howard Lang as Jim Arnold
- Ethel Wales as Clarissa 'Clary' Peters
- Paul Fix as Henchman Gila
- J. P. McGowanas Buck Peters
- Joe Rickson as Henchman Herb Layton
- Al St. John as Henchman Cinco
- John Merton as Henchman Carp
- Frank Layton as Henchman Elbows
- Chill Wills as Henchman
- Chill Wills and His Avalon Boys as Background Musicians
