= Lone Star Raiders =

1940 film

- Film poster
- Directed by: George Sherman
- Written by: William Colt MacDonald; Joseph Moncure March; Charles F. Royal; Barry Shipman
- Produced by: Louis Gray
- Starring: Robert Livingston; Bob Steele; Rufe Davis
- Cinematography: William Nobles
- Edited by: Tony Martinelli
- Production company: Republic Pictures
- Distributed by: Republic Pictures
- Release date: December 23, 1940
- Running time: 57 minutes
- Country: United States
- Language: English

Lone Star Raiders is a 1940 American Western "Three Mesquiteers" B-movie directed by George Sherman.

== Cast ==
- Robert Livingston as Stony Brooke
- Bob Steele as Tucson Smith
- Rufe Davis as Lullaby Joslin
- June Johnson as Linda Cameron
- George Douglas as Henry Martin
- Sarah Padden as Lydia 'Granny' Phelps
- John Elliott as Dad Cameron
- John Merton as Henchman Dixon
- Rex Lease as Henchman Fisher
- Bud Osborne as Ranch hand
- Jack Kirk as Ranch hand
- Tom London as Ranch hand
- Hal Price as Sheriff

== See also ==
- Bob Steele filmography
