= Heroes of the Hills =

1938 film

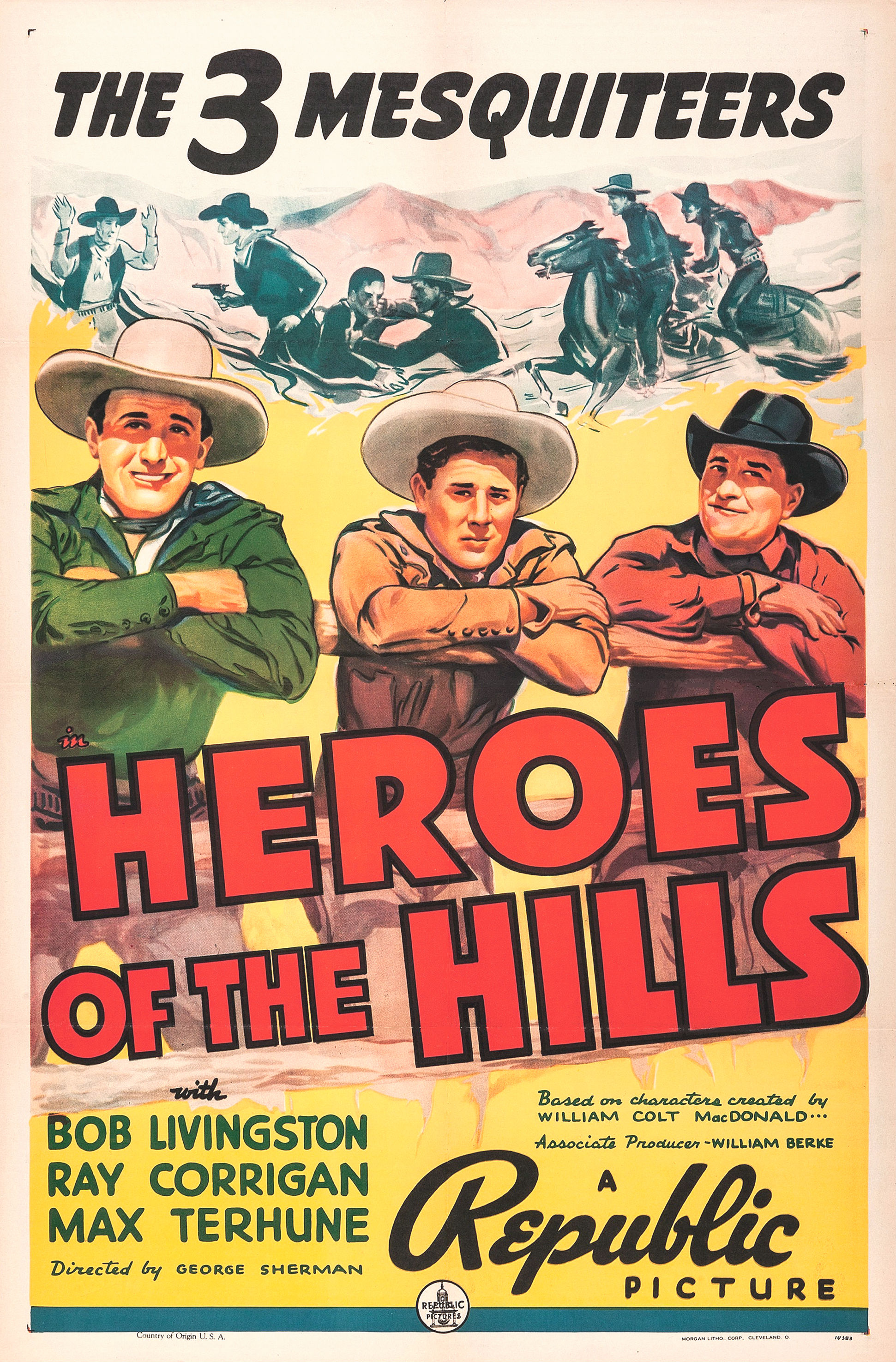
- Film poster
- Directed by: George Sherman
- Written by: William Colt MacDonald; Betty Burbridge; Jack Natteford
- Produced by: William Berke
- Starring: Robert Livingston; Ray Corrigan; Max Terhune
- Cinematography: Reggie Lanning
- Edited by: Tony Martinelli
- Distributed by: Republic Pictures
- Release date: August 1, 1938
- Running time: 56 minutes
- Country: United States
- Language: English

Heroes of the Hills is a 1938 American Western "Three Mesquiteers" B-movie directed by George Sherman.

== Cast ==
- Robert Livingston as Stony Brooke
- Ray Corrigan as Tucson Smith
- Max Terhune as Lullaby Joslin
- Priscilla Lawson as Madeline Reynolds
- LeRoy Mason as Red
- James Eagles as The Kid
- Roy Barcroft as Robert Beaton
- Barry Hays as Beaton's cohort
- Carleton Young as Connors
- Forrest Taylor as Sheriff
- John P. Wade as Board chairman (as John Wade)
- Maston Williams as Convict
