= Under Texas Skies (1940 film) =

1940 film

- Film poster
- Directed by: George Sherman
- Written by: William Colt MacDonald; Anthony Coldeway; Betty Burbridge
- Produced by: Harry Grey
- Starring: Robert Livingston; Bob Steele; Rufe Davis
- Cinematography: William Nobles
- Edited by: Tony Martinelli
- Music by: Cy Feuer
- Distributed by: Republic Pictures
- Release date: September 30, 1940
- Running time: 57 minutes
- Country: United States
- Language: English

Under Texas Skies is a 1940 American Western "Three Mesquiteers" B-movie directed by George Sherman and starring Robert Livingston, Bob Steele, and Rufe Davis, in his first film of the series. It was produced and released by Republic Pictures.

== Plot ==
Stoney Brooke (Robert Livingston) returns to his hometown to find his father, the town sheriff, has been killed by his best friend Tucson Smith (Bob Steele). Tucson is briefly jailed by the new sheriff, Tom Blackton (Henry Brandon), before being broken out and hiding with his sister until a retrial can be held. When the Circuit Judge meant to find him innocent is mysteriously killed, Stoney sets out to prove that Tucson is an innocent man. Using information gathered by a friend of his who owns the local barbershop, Stoney learns that Tom Blackton masterminded the plan to murder sheriff Brooke, take his position and frame Tucson for the killing. Stoney rounds up the townsfolk and their cattle to catch Tom Blackton in a lie and have him convicted for the murder of former sheriff Brooke. This encounter ends with a shootout between Brooke and Blackton, resulting in Blackton's death and Stoney Brooke taking over his father's title of sheriff.

== Cast ==
- Robert Livingston as Stony Brooke
- Bob Steele as Tucson Smith
- Rufe Davis as Lullaby Joslin
- Lois Ranson as Helen Smith
- Henry Brandon as Tom Blackton
- Wade Boteler as Sheriff Brooke
- Rex Lease as Jim Marsden
- Jack Ingram as Henchman Finley
- Walter Tetley as Theodore - Barber-Shop Boy
- Yakima Canutt as Henchman Talbot
- Earle Hodgins as Smithers - Barber

== See also ==
- Bob Steele filmography
