= Cowboys from Texas =

1939 film

- Film poster
- Directed by: George Sherman
- Written by: William Colt MacDonald; Oliver Drake
- Produced by: Harry Grey
- Starring: Robert Livingston; Raymond Hatton; Duncan Renaldo
- Cinematography: Ernest Miller
- Edited by: Tony Martinelli
- Distributed by: Republic Pictures
- Release date: November 29, 1939
- Running time: 54 minutes
- Country: United States
- Language: English

Cowboys from Texas is a 1939 American Western "Three Mesquiteers" B-movie directed by George Sherman.

== Cast ==
- Robert Livingston as Stony Brooke
- Raymond Hatton as Rusty Joslin
- Duncan Renaldo as Renaldo
- Carole Landis as June Jones
- Charles Middleton as Kansas Jones
- Ivan Miller as Clay Allison
- Betty Compson as Belle Starkey
- Ethan Laidlaw as Duke Plummer
- Yakima Canutt as Tex Dawson
- Walter Wills as Editor Jeff Morgan
- Ed Cassidy as Cattleman Jed Tyler (as Edward Cassidy)
