= The Phantom Cowboy (1941 film) =

1941 film by George Sherman

- Directed by: George Sherman
- Screenplay by: Doris Schroeder
- Produced by: George Sherman
- Starring: Don "Red" Barry; Virginia Carroll; Milburn Stone; Neyle Morrow; Rex Lease; Nick Thompson
- Cinematography: Reggie Lanning
- Edited by: Tony Martinelli
- Music by: Cy Feuer
- Production company: Republic Pictures
- Distributed by: Republic Pictures
- Release date: February 14, 1941
- Running time: 56 minutes
- Country: United States
- Language: English

The Phantom Cowboy is a 1941 American Western film directed by George Sherman and written by Doris Schroeder. The film stars Don "Red" Barry, Virginia Carroll, Milburn Stone, Neyle Morrow, Rex Lease and Nick Thompson. The film was released on February 14, 1941, by Republic Pictures.

== Cast ==
- Don "Red" Barry as Jim Lawrence
- Virginia Carroll as Elanita Toreno
- Milburn Stone as Stan Borden
- Neyle Morrow as Miguel Garcia (El Lobo)
- Rex Lease as Sheriff Ben Jeffers
- Nick Thompson as Pancho
- Bud Osborne as Dreer
- Ernest Wilson as Memphis
- Burr Caruth as Lawyer Eric Motley
