= The Cyclone Kid =

The Cyclone Kid may refer to:

- The Cyclone Kid (1931 film)
- The Cyclone Kid (1942 film)
