= Wild Horse Rodeo =

1937 film by George Sherman

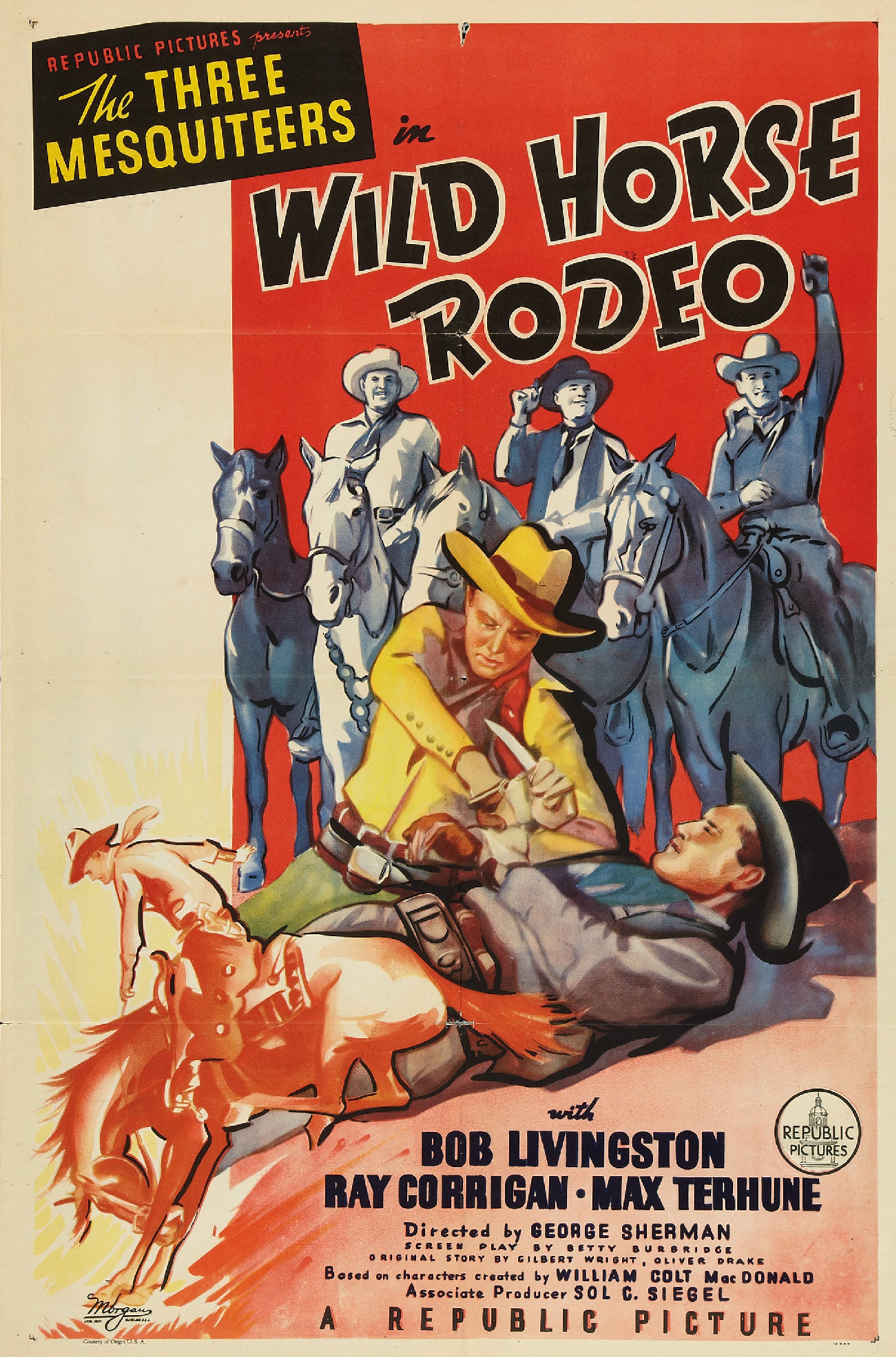
- Theatrical release poster
- Directed by: George Sherman
- Written by: William Colt MacDonald
- Screenplay by: Oliver Drake; Betty Burbridge
- Story by: Oliver Drake; Gilbert Wright
- Produced by: Sol C. Siegel
- Starring: Robert Livingston; Ray Corrigan; Max Terhune
- Cinematography: William Nobles
- Edited by: Lester Orlebeck
- Music by: Alberto Colombo
- Production company: Republic Pictures
- Distributed by: Republic Pictures
- Release date: December 6, 1937 (US)
- Running time: 55 minutes
- Country: United States
- Language: English

Wild Horse Rodeo is a 1937 American Western film directed by George Sherman and starring Robert Livingston, Ray Corrigan, and Max Terhune. Written by Oliver Drake and Betty Burbridge, based on a story by Drake and Gilbert Wright, the film is about a champion rodeo rider who returns to his home town in search of a legendary wild horse called Cyclone. The film is part of the Three Mesquiteers series of B-movies produced by Republic Pictures. Wild Horse Rodeo was the first film directed by George Sherman, who later directed numerous Western films for Republic, Columbia Pictures, and Universal Pictures.

== Cast ==
- Robert Livingston as Stony Brooke
- Ray Corrigan as Tucson Smith
- Max Terhune as Lullaby Joslin
- June Martel as Alice Harkley
- Walter Miller as Colonel Nye
- Edmund Cobb as Hank Bain
- William Gould as Harkley
- Jack Ingram as Jim
- Roy Rogers as Singer (as Dick Weston)
- Henry Isabell as Slim
