= Rocky Mountain Rangers (film) =

1940 film

- Film poster
- Directed by: George Sherman
- Written by: William Colt MacDonald; J. Benton Cheney; Barry Shipman
- Produced by: Harry Grey
- Starring: Robert Livingston; Raymond Hatton; Duncan Renaldo
- Cinematography: Jack A. Marta
- Edited by: Lester Orlebeck
- Release date: May 24, 1940
- Running time: 58 minutes
- Country: United States
- Language: English

Rocky Mountain Rangers is a 1940 American Western "Three Mesquiteers" B-movie directed by George Sherman and starring Robert Livingston, Raymond Hatton, and Duncan Renaldo.

== Cast ==
- Robert Livingston as Stony Brooke
- Raymond Hatton as Rusty Joslin
- Duncan Renaldo as Renaldo
- Rosella Towne as Doris Manners
- Sammy McKim as Danny Burke
- LeRoy Mason as King Barton
- Pat O'Malley as Captain Taylor
- Dennis Moore as Jim Barton
- John St. Polis as Joseph Manners
- Robert Blair as Sergeant Bush
- Burr Caruth as John
- Jack Kirk as Henchman Harris
