= The Apache Kid (1941 film) =

1941 film

- Theatrical release poster
- Directed by: George Sherman
- Screenplay by: Eliot Gibbons; Richard Murphy
- Produced by: George Sherman
- Starring: Don "Red" Barry; Lynn Merrick; LeRoy Mason; Robert Fiske; John Elliott; Forbes Murray
- Cinematography: Harry Neumann
- Edited by: Lester Orlebeck
- Music by: Cy Feuer
- Production company: Republic Pictures
- Distributed by: Republic Pictures
- Release date: September 12, 1941
- Running time: 56 minutes
- Country: United States
- Language: English

The Apache Kid is a 1941 American Western film directed by George Sherman and written by Eliot Gibbons and Richard Murphy. The film stars Don "Red" Barry, Lynn Merrick, LeRoy Mason, Robert Fiske, John Elliott and Forbes Murray. The film was released on September 12, 1941, by Republic Pictures.

== Cast ==
- Don "Red" Barry as Pete Dawson aka The Apache Kid
- Lynn Merrick as Barbara Taylor
- LeRoy Mason as Nick Barter
- Robert Fiske as Joe Walker
- John Elliott as Judge John Taylor
- Forbes Murray as U.S. Road Commissioner
- Monte Montague as Sheriff
- Al St. John as Stage Guard Dangle
- Fred Toones as Snowflake
