= The Tulsa Kid =

1940 film

- Directed by: George Sherman
- Screenplay by: Oliver Drake; Anthony Coldeway
- Produced by: George Sherman
- Starring: Don "Red" Barry; Noah Beery Sr. Luana Walters; David Durand; George Douglas; Ethan Laidlaw
- Cinematography: John MacBurnie
- Edited by: William P. Thompson
- Production company: Republic Pictures
- Distributed by: Republic Pictures
- Release date: August 16, 1940
- Running time: 57 minutes
- Country: United States
- Language: English

The Tulsa Kid is a 1940 American Western film directed by George Sherman, written by Oliver Drake and Anthony Coldeway, and starring Don "Red" Barry, Noah Beery Sr., Luana Walters, David Durand, George Douglas and Ethan Laidlaw. It was released on August 16, 1940 by Republic Pictures.

== Cast ==
- Don "Red" Barry as Tom Benton aka Tulsa Kid
- Noah Beery Sr. as Montana Smith
- Luana Walters as Mary Wallace
- David Durand as Bob Wallace
- George Douglas as Dirk Saunders
- Ethan Laidlaw as Henchman Nick Carson
- Stanley Blystone as Sam Ellis
- John Elliott as Judge Perkins
- Jack Kirk as Sheriff Austin
- Fred Toones as Snowflake
