= A Missouri Outlaw =

1941 film by George Sherman

- Theatrical release poster
- Directed by: George Sherman
- Screenplay by: Jack Lait Jr. Doris Schroeder
- Produced by: George Sherman
- Starring: Don "Red" Barry; Lynn Merrick; Noah Beery, Sr. Paul Fix; Al St. John; Frank LaRue
- Cinematography: Jack A. Marta
- Edited by: William P. Thompson
- Production company: Republic Pictures
- Distributed by: Republic Pictures
- Release date: November 25, 1941
- Running time: 58 minutes
- Country: United States
- Language: English

A Missouri Outlaw is a 1941 American Western film directed by George Sherman and written by Jack Lait Jr. and Doris Schroeder. The film stars Don "Red" Barry, Lynn Merrick, Noah Beery, Sr., Paul Fix, Al St. John and Frank LaRue. The film was released on November 25, 1941, by Republic Pictures.

== Cast ==
- Don "Red" Barry as Cliff Dixon
- Lynn Merrick as Virginia Randall
- Noah Beery, Sr. as Sheriff Ben Dixon
- Paul Fix as Mark Roberts
- Al St. John as Dan Willoughby
- Frank LaRue as Randall
- Kenne Duncan as Henchman Pete Chandler
- John Merton as Henchman Bancroft
- Carleton Young as Henchman Luke Allen
- Frank Brownlee as Dairyman Jensen
- Fred Toones as Snowflake
