= None but the Brave (1960 film) =

1960 film by George Sherman

- Directed by: George Sherman
- Written by: D.D. Beauchamp
- Produced by: George Sherman
- Starring: Richard Basehart
- Cinematography: Alex Phillips
- Edited by: Fredrick Y. Smith
- Music by: Raúl Lavista
- Color process: Color by DeLuxe
- Production company: Shergari Productions
- Distributed by: 20th Century Fox
- Release date: August 28, 1960 (Bismarck)
- Running time: 87 minutes
- Country: United States
- Language: English

None But the Brave (also known as The Golden Touch and For the Love of Mike) is a 1960 American CinemaScope Western film directed by George Sherman and starring Richard Basehart. It was written by D.D. Beauchamp.

== Plot ==
A young priest comes to a town where an old priest wants to build a church before he dies.

== Cast ==
- Richard Basehart as Father Francis Phelan
- Stuart Erwin as Doctor Henry G. Mills (as Stu Erwin)
- Arthur Shields as Father Walsh
- Armando Silvestre as Tony Eagle
- Elsa Cárdenas as Mrs. Eagle
- Murray Stecker as Ty Corbin (as Michael Steckler)
- Rex Allen as himself
- Danny Bravo as Michael (as Danny Zaidiver)

== Production ==
It was the first film from a new company formed by director George Sherman, and was filmed in Mexico in February 1960.

== Reception ==
The Monthly Film Bulletin wrote: "A simple, stereotyped plot, emphasis on wholesome moral values and considerable footage devoted to the Indian boy's animals add up to a film well suited to young and unsophisticated audiences. In its mild, unassuming way it has a good deal of charm, and George Sherman's direction sustains an aptly light and gentle tone. The straightforward photography efficiently evokes the barrenness of New Mexico's long mountain vistas, and Richard Basehart's innate strength as the younger priest helps give the film a solid basis."

Kine Weekly wrote: "The picture has neither heroine nor villain, yet gets along comfortably without sex or rough stuff. Danny Bravo is a likeable and intelligent Mike, Arthur Shields and Stu Erwin share many laughable moments as Walsh and Mills, Richard Basehart is sound as Phelan, and Rex Allen, who sings the signature tune, scores as himself. The religious sentiment lightly nudges the heart, its animal sequences are engaging, and the horse racing is exciting."

Variety wrote: "An overdose of sweetness and light cloys an otherwise entertaining initial production effort by Shergari Corp in For The Love Of Mike. The new company ... obviously has set out to produce a picture for the 'family' audience, but in so doing has burdened its product with an assortment of too-good-to-be-true stereotypes. Easily predictable dramatic situations result in loss of tension in scenes that need it."

== See also ==
- List of American films of 1960
