= The Enemy General =

- Directed by: George Sherman
- Screenplay by: Dan Pepper; Burt Picard
- Story by: Dan Pepper
- Produced by: Sam Katzman
- Starring: Van Johnson; Jean-Pierre Aumont; Dany Carrel
- Cinematography: Basil Emmott
- Edited by: Edwin H. Bryant; Gordon Pilkington
- Music by: Mischa Bakaleinikoff
- Production company: Clover Productions
- Distributed by: Columbia Pictures
- Release date: October 19, 1960
- Running time: 75 minutes
- Country: United States
- Language: English

The Enemy General is a 1960 American drama war film directed by George Sherman and starring Van Johnson.

The film was shot on location in Europe.

== Plot ==
The setting is World War II. An Office of Strategic Services agent, working with the French Resistance, ambushes a Nazi convoy with a high-ranking general, who escapes. Later they take him from a Nazi prison and smuggle him to England.

== Cast ==
- Van Johnson as Captain Allan Lemaire
- Jean-Pierre Aumont as Lionel Durand
- Dany Carrel as Lisette
- John Van Dreelen as SS-Gruppenführer Ernest Bruger
- Françoise Prévost as Nicole
- Hubert Noël as Claude
- Jacques Marin as Marceau
- Gérard Landry as Navarre
- Edward Fleming as Sergeant Allen
- Paul Bonifas as Mayor
- Paul Muller as Major Zughoff

== Novelization ==
A novelization of the screenplay was issued by Monarch Books in May 1960—about two months in advance of the film's release (as was often customary in the era). The by-line was given as "Dan Pepper & Max Gareth". Both names were pseudonyms. "Dan Pepper", also credited as co-screenwriter, was a joint pseudonym for Lou Morheim (who would become a noted screenwriter and producer under his own name) and American novelist Stuart James.
