= Comanche Territory (1950 film) =

1950 film by George Sherman

- Theatrical release poster
- Directed by: George Sherman
- Written by: Lewis Meltzer
- Screenplay by: Oscar Brodney; Lewis Meltzer
- Produced by: Leonard Goldstein
- Starring: Maureen O'Hara; Macdonald Carey
- Cinematography: Maury Gertsman
- Edited by: Frank Gross
- Music by: Frank Skinner
- Color process: Technicolor
- Production company: Universal Pictures
- Distributed by: Universal Pictures
- Release date: May 1, 1950
- Running time: 76 minutes
- Country: United States
- Language: English
- Box office: $1.6 million

Comanche Territory is a 1950 American Western film directed by George Sherman and starring Maureen O'Hara and Macdonald Carey.

== Plot ==
An Indian treaty prevents settlers establishing camp on Comanche territory, but silver has been found and the government has sent Jim Bowie and Dan'l Seeger to negotiate a new treaty to allow it to be mined.

Bowie soon finds that the settlers are planning a raid on the Comanche, all instigated by saloon owner Katie Howard and her crooked brother Stacey. Katie falls in love with Bowie and turns honest, but it may be too late to prevent another Indian war.

== Cast ==
- Maureen O'Hara as Katie Howard
- Macdonald Carey as James Bowie
- Will Geer as Dan'l Seeger
- Charles Drake as Stacey Howard
- Pedro de Cordoba as Quisima
- Ian MacDonald as Walsh
- Rick Vallin as Pakanah
- Parley Baer as Boozer, the bartender
- James Best as Sam
- Edmund Cobb as Ed

== Production ==
In March 1949, Universal Pictures announced that it would produce a biopic of Jim Bowie produced by Leonard Goldstein, most likely to star Scott Brady as Bowie. The film was originally titled The Bowie Knife. It was Maureen O'Hara's second film for Universal, following Bagdad (1949), and costar Macdonald Carey's second film on loan from Paramount, following South Sea Sinner (1950).

Location scouting was performed in Kanab, Utah, but filming took place in and around the Oak Creek Canyon area of Arizona.

Filming was postponed for one week in August 1949 so that O'Hara could recover from laryngitis.

== Legacy ==
Quentin Tarantino paid tribute to Comanche Territory and one other George Sherman film, Red Canyon, by hosting special screenings of the films at the 2025 Cannes Film Festival.
