= The West Side Kid =

1943 film by George Sherman

- Theatrical release poster
- Directed by: George Sherman
- Screenplay by: Albert Beich; Anthony Coldeway
- Produced by: George Sherman
- Starring: Don "Red" Barry; Henry Hull; Dale Evans; Chick Chandler; Matt McHugh; Nana Bryant
- Cinematography: Jack A. Marta
- Edited by: Ernest J. Nims
- Music by: Mort Glickman
- Production company: Republic Pictures
- Distributed by: Republic Pictures
- Release date: August 23, 1943
- Running time: 58 minutes
- Country: United States
- Language: English

The West Side Kid is a 1943 American crime film directed by George Sherman and starring Don "Red" Barry, Henry Hull, Dale Evans, Chick Chandler, Matt McHugh and Nana Bryant. Written by Albert Beich and Anthony Coldeway, the film was released on August 23, 1943, by Republic Pictures.

== Plot ==
Although publishing a newspaper has made him a success, Sam Winston is so unhappy in his home life that when he meets Johnny April, a criminal just out of jail, he asks Johnny to kill him and offers $25,000. Sam tells a confused Johnny that he doesn't have the nerve to commit suicide, so he will pay Johnny to do the job.

Taking a few days to get to know his victim, Johnny discovers the reasons for Sam's unhappiness. His spoiled daughter Gloria is trifling with a stockbroker boyfriend's affections. His son Jerry is a jobless drunkard. His wife is cold to Sam and is having a fling with his doctor.

The more they're together, the more Johnny likes Sam and doesn't care to kill him. But when the doctor is found dead, Johnny becomes a suspect. He leaves town and takes Sam along, hiding him at a farm. Family members suddenly miss Sam being around and begin leading better lives. Sam finds a reason to go on living, and Johnny is also a changed man.

== Cast ==
- Don "Red" Barry as Johnny April
- Henry Hull as Sam Winston
- Dale Evans as Gloria Winston
- Chick Chandler as Shoelace
- Matt McHugh as The Worrier
- Nana Bryant as Mrs. Winston
- Walter Catlett as Ramsey Fensel
- Edward Gargan as Donovan
- Chester Clute as Gwylim
- Peter Lawford as Jerry Winston
- Georges Metaxa as Dr. Kenton
- Dorothy Burgess as Toodles
