= Dangerous Business (1946 film) =

1946 film by D. Ross Lederman

- Film poster
- Directed by: D. Ross Lederman
- Written by: Harold Jacob Smith (screenplay); Harry Essex (play)
- Produced by: Ted Richmond
- Starring: Forrest Tucker; Lynn Merrick and Gerald Mohr
- Cinematography: George Meehan
- Edited by: Richard Fantl
- Production company: Columbia Pictures
- Release date: June 20, 1946
- Running time: 60 minutes
- Country: United States
- Language: English

Dangerous Business is a 1946 American comedy drama film directed by D. Ross Lederman. The film was directed by Ross Lederman with screenplay written by Harold Jacob Smith and Harry Essex.

== Plot ==
B. J. Calhoun, a wealthy utilities entrepreneur, gives a commencement speech at a law school with the promise of assisting the new graduates. Young graduates and lovers Clayton Russell and Lizbeth Ellsworth plan to marry once they earn $10,000; but the bombing of Pearl Harbor puts their plans on hold. Russell enlists, and Ellsworth joins others in Washington DC to support the WW II effort. After the war the couple reunite and start a new law practice. Fellow vet, and petty thief, Alexander Pough visits their office and informs them that Calhoun has been arrested on embezzlement charges.

Pough agrees to help Russell on the law team's first case, which could aid the young lovers in building their nest egg. Calhoun is distrustful of lawyers after being set up by his first lawyer, Fluger. Russell and Ellsworth earn Calhoun's trust, but Calhoun confides in them that he fears for his life. Ellsworth's mother helps with bail, but falling short of the required amount, Pough secures enough from his underworld friends to secure the release of Calhoun. Calhoun is kidnapped, by petty thugs in league with Fluger. Hijinks with dead bodies, trial theatrics, fights and cops add to the story. In the end Calhoun's faith in the justice system is restored, and he gives the young legal eagles $10,000 as a retainer.

== Cast ==
- Forrest Tucker as Clayton Russell
- Lynn Merrick as Lizbeth Ellsworth
- Gerald Mohr as Duke
- Gus Schilling as Alexander Pough
- Shemp Howard as Monk
- Frank Sully as Bert
- Cora Witherspoon as Mrs. Abigail Ellsworth
- Thurston Hall as B.J. Calhoun
