= Ten Days to Tulara =

1958 film by George Sherman

- Theatrical release poster
- Directed by: George Sherman
- Screenplay by: Laurence E. Mascott
- Produced by: George Sherman
- Starring: Sterling Hayden; Grace Raynor; Rodolfo Hoyos, Jr.
- Cinematography: Alex Phillips
- Edited by: Carlos Savage
- Music by: Lan Adomian
- Color process: Black and white
- Production company: George Sherman Productions
- Distributed by: United Artists
- Release date: October 29, 1958
- Running time: 77 minutes
- Country: United States
- Language: English

Ten Days to Tulara is a 1958 American Western film directed by George Sherman and starring Sterling Hayden, Grace Raynor and Rodolfo Hoyos, Jr.

== Plot ==
Tramp pilot Scott McBride goes to meet a Mr. Rodriguez who has a mission for him in the South American jungle. He turns out to be Cesar, Scotty's old enemy, who demands that Scotty fly him and his henchmen, on the lam on a robbery and murder charge, to a waiting ship on the other side of the continent.

== Cast ==
- Sterling Hayden as Scotty
- Grace Raynor as Teresa
- Rodolfo Hoyos, Jr. as Cesar
- Carlos Múzquiz as Dario
- Tony Carbajal as Francisco (as Tony Carvajal)
- Juan García as Piranha
- Rafael Alcayde as Mexican colonel
- Félix González as Marco

== See also ==
- List of American films of 1958
