= Rafael Alcayde =

Mexican actor

- Born: 19 October 1906
- Died: 27 August 1993 (aged 86)
- Occupation: Actor
- Years active: 1938-1964

Rafael Alcayde (19 October 1906 – 27 August 1993) was a Mexican film actor.

== Selected filmography ==
- Kiss and Make-Up (1934)
- I Am a Fugitive (1946)
- Caribbean Rose (1946)
- Pepita Jiménez (1946)
- Cantaclaro (1946)
- The Associate (1946)
- The Kneeling Goddess (1947)
- Strange Appointment (1947)
- Adventures of Casanova (1948)
- The Mark of the Skunk (1950)
- The White Rose (1954)
- Bluebeard (1955)
- Drop the Curtain (1955)
- The New World (1957)
- Ten Days to Tulara (1958)
- The Last of the Fast Guns (1958)
- Villa!! (1958)

== Bibliography ==
- Victoria Ruétalo & Dolores Tierney. Latsploitation, Exploitation Cinemas, and Latin America. Routledge, 2009.
