= The Sombrero Kid =

1942 film by George Sherman

- Theatrical release poster
- Directed by: George Sherman
- Screenplay by: Norman S. Hall
- Produced by: George Sherman
- Starring: Don "Red" Barry; Lynn Merrick; Robert Homans; John James; Joel Friedkin; Rand Brooks
- Cinematography: William Bradford
- Edited by: William P. Thompson
- Music by: Mort Glickman
- Production company: Republic Pictures
- Distributed by: Republic Pictures
- Release date: July 31, 1942
- Running time: 56 minutes
- Country: United States
- Language: English

The Sombrero Kid is a 1942 American Western film directed by George Sherman, written by Norman S. Hall, and starring Don "Red" Barry, Lynn Merrick, Robert Homans, John James, Joel Friedkin and Rand Brooks. It was released on July 31, 1942, by Republic Pictures.

== Cast ==
- Don "Red" Barry as Jerry Holden aka Jerry Clancy
- Lynn Merrick as Dorothy Russell
- Robert Homans as Marshal Thomas Holden
- John James as Tommy Holden
- Joel Friedkin as Uriah Martin
- Rand Brooks as Philip Martin
- Stuart Hamblen as Smoke Denton
- Bob McKenzie as Judge Tater
- Slim Andrews as Panamint
- Anne O'Neal as Mrs. Barnett
