= The Last of the Fast Guns =

1958 film directed by George Sherman

- Theatrical release poster
- Directed by: George Sherman
- Written by: David P. Harmon
- Based on: Outlaw's Code; 1932 novel by Evan Evans
- Produced by: Howard Christie
- Starring: Jock Mahoney; Gilbert Roland; Linda Cristal; Eduard Franz; Lorne Greene; Carl Benton Reid
- Cinematography: Alex Phillips
- Edited by: Patrick McCormack
- Production company: Universal Pictures
- Distributed by: Universal Pictures
- Release date: July 1958
- Running time: 82 minutes
- Country: United States
- Language: English

The Last of the Fast Guns is a 1958 American Western film directed by George Sherman and written by David P. Harmon. The film stars Jock Mahoney, Gilbert Roland, Linda Cristal, Eduard Franz, Lorne Greene and Carl Benton Reid. The film was released in July 1958, by Universal Pictures.

== Plot ==
A U.S. tycoon hires an 1880s gunfighter to find his brother in Mexico.

== Cast ==
- Jock Mahoney as Brad Ellison
- Gilbert Roland as Miles Lang
- Linda Cristal as Maria O'Reilly
- Eduard Franz as Padre Jose
- Lorne Greene as Michael O'Reilly
- Carl Benton Reid as John Forbes
- Edward Platt as Samuel Grypton
- Eduardo Noriega as Cordoba
- Jorge Treviño as Manuel
- Rafael Alcayde as Alcalde
- Lee Morgan as Johnny Ringo
- Milton Bernstein as James Younger
- Stillman Segar as Ben Thompson
- José Chávez as Garcia
- Francisco Reiguera as Pablo
- Richard H. Cutting as Sheriff
- Ralph Neff as Bartender
