= Ghost Valley Raiders =

1940 film

- Directed by: George Sherman
- Screenplay by: Bennett Cohen
- Story by: Connie Lee
- Produced by: George Sherman
- Starring: Don "Red" Barry; Lona Andre; LeRoy Mason; Tom London; Jack Ingram; Ralph Peters
- Cinematography: Ernest Miller
- Edited by: Lester Orlebeck
- Production company: Republic Pictures
- Distributed by: Republic Pictures
- Release date: March 26, 1940
- Running time: 57 minutes
- Country: United States
- Language: English

Ghost Valley Raiders is a 1940 American Western film directed by George Sherman and written by Bennett Cohen. The film stars Don "Red" Barry, Lona Andre, LeRoy Mason, Tom London, Jack Ingram and Ralph Peters. The film was released on March 26, 1940, by Republic Pictures.

== Plot ==
Government agent Tim Brandon comes to Silver City to investigate a series of stagecoach and gold shipment disappearances. He teams with the local sheriff and stagecoach line worker Linda to take on the local gang responsible for the disappearances.

== Cast ==
- Don "Red" Barry as Tim Brandon aka The Tolusa Kid
- Lona Andre as Linda Marley
- LeRoy Mason as Frank Ewing
- Tom London as Sheriff
- Jack Ingram as Sam Kennelly
- Ralph Peters as Deputy Hank
- Horace Murphy as Mob Ringleader
- Curley Dresden as Henchman Rawhide
- Yakima Canutt as 1st Stage Driver
