= Two Gun Sheriff =

1941 film by George Sherman

- Theatrical release poster
- Directed by: George Sherman
- Screenplay by: Doris Schroeder
- Story by: Bennett Cohen
- Produced by: George Sherman
- Starring: Don "Red" Barry; Lynn Merrick; Jay Novello; Lupita Tovar; Milton Kibbee; Fred Kohler Jr.
- Cinematography: William Nobles
- Edited by: Tony Martinelli
- Production company: Republic Pictures
- Distributed by: Republic Pictures
- Release date: April 10, 1941
- Running time: 56 minutes
- Country: United States
- Language: English

Two Gun Sheriff is a 1941 American Western film directed by George Sherman, written by Doris Schroeder, and starring Don "Red" Barry, Lynn Merrick, Jay Novello, Lupita Tovar, Milton Kibbee and Fred Kohler Jr. It was released on April 10, 1941, by Republic Pictures.

== Cast ==
- Don "Red" Barry as Jim McKinnon the Sundown Kid / Bruce McKinnon
- Lynn Merrick as Ruth Norton
- Jay Novello as Marc Albo
- Lupita Tovar as Nita
- Milton Kibbee as Deputy Jones
- Fred Kohler Jr. as Henchman Buck Keller
- Marin Sais as Mrs. McKinnon
- Fred Toones as Snowflake
- Dirk Thane as Henchman Duke
- Arch Hall, Sr. as Henchman Dunn
- Charles Thomas as Tex Calhoun
- Lee Shumway as Sheriff Blake
