= Arizona Terrors =

1942 film

- Theatrical release poster
- Directed by: George Sherman
- Screenplay by: Doris Schroeder; Taylor Caven
- Story by: Doris Schroeder; Taylor Caven
- Produced by: George Sherman
- Starring: Don "Red" Barry; Lynn Merrick; Al St. John; Reed Hadley; John Maxwell; Frank Brownlee
- Cinematography: Ernest Miller
- Edited by: Lester Orlebeck
- Music by: Cy Feuer
- Production company: Republic Pictures
- Distributed by: Republic Pictures
- Release date: January 13, 1942
- Running time: 58 minutes
- Country: United States
- Language: English

Arizona Terrors is a 1942 American Western film directed by George Sherman and written by Doris Schroeder and Taylor Caven. The film stars Don "Red" Barry, Lynn Merrick, Al St. John, Reed Hadley, John Maxwell and Frank Brownlee. The film was released on January 13, 1942, by Republic Pictures.

== Cast ==
- Don "Red" Barry as Jim Bradley
- Lynn Merrick as Lila Adams
- Al St. John as Hardtack
- Reed Hadley as Jack Halliday aka Don Pedro de Berendo
- John Maxwell as Larry Madden
- Frank Brownlee as Henry Adams
- Rex Lease as Henchman Briggs
- Lee Shumway as Sheriff Wilcox
- Tom London as Rancher Wade
