= Red Canyon (1949 film) =

1949 film by George Sherman

- Directed by: George Sherman
- Screenplay by: Maurice Geraghty
- Based on: Wildfire by Zane Grey
- Produced by: Leonard Goldstein
- Starring: Ann Blyth; Howard Duff; George Brent
- Cinematography: Irving Glassberg
- Edited by: Otto Ludwig
- Music by: Walter Scharf
- Color process: Technicolor
- Production company: Universal International Pictures
- Distributed by: Universal Pictures
- Release date: 1949
- Running time: 82 minutes
- Country: United States
- Language: English

Red Canyon is a 1949 American Western film directed by George Sherman and starring Ann Blyth, Howard Duff and George Brent. It was based on the 1917 novel Wildfire by Zane Grey.

== Plot ==
The plot revolves around Black Velvet, a wild stallion that runs rampant across the range. Two people, reformed bad man Lin Sloan (played by Howard Duff) and tomboyish farmer's daughter Lucy Bostel (Ann Blyth), think they can tame him. In the process, they tame each other.

== Cast ==
- Ann Blyth as Lucy Bostel
- Howard Duff as Lin Sloan
- George Brent as Matthew Bostel
- Edgar Buchanan as Jonah Johnson
- John McIntire as Floyd Cordt
- Chill Wills as Brackton
- Jane Darwell as Aunt Jane
- Lloyd Bridges as Virgil Cordt
- James Seay as Joel Creech
- Edmund MacDonald as Farlane
- David Clarke as Sears
- Denver Pyle as Hutch
- Willard W. Willingham as Van (as William Willingham)

== Production ==
Parts of the film were shot in Duck Creek, Cascade Falls, Kanab Canyon, Kanab Race Track, Aspen Mirror Lake, Paria, Tibbets Valley, and Bryce Canyon in Utah.

== 2025 Cannes Film Festival tribute ==
Quentin Tarantino paid tribute to Red Canyon and one other George Sherman film, Comanche Territory, by hosting special screenings of the films at the 2025 Cannes Film Festival.

== See also ==
- List of films about horses
