= Taming Sutton's Gal =

1957 film by Lesley Selander

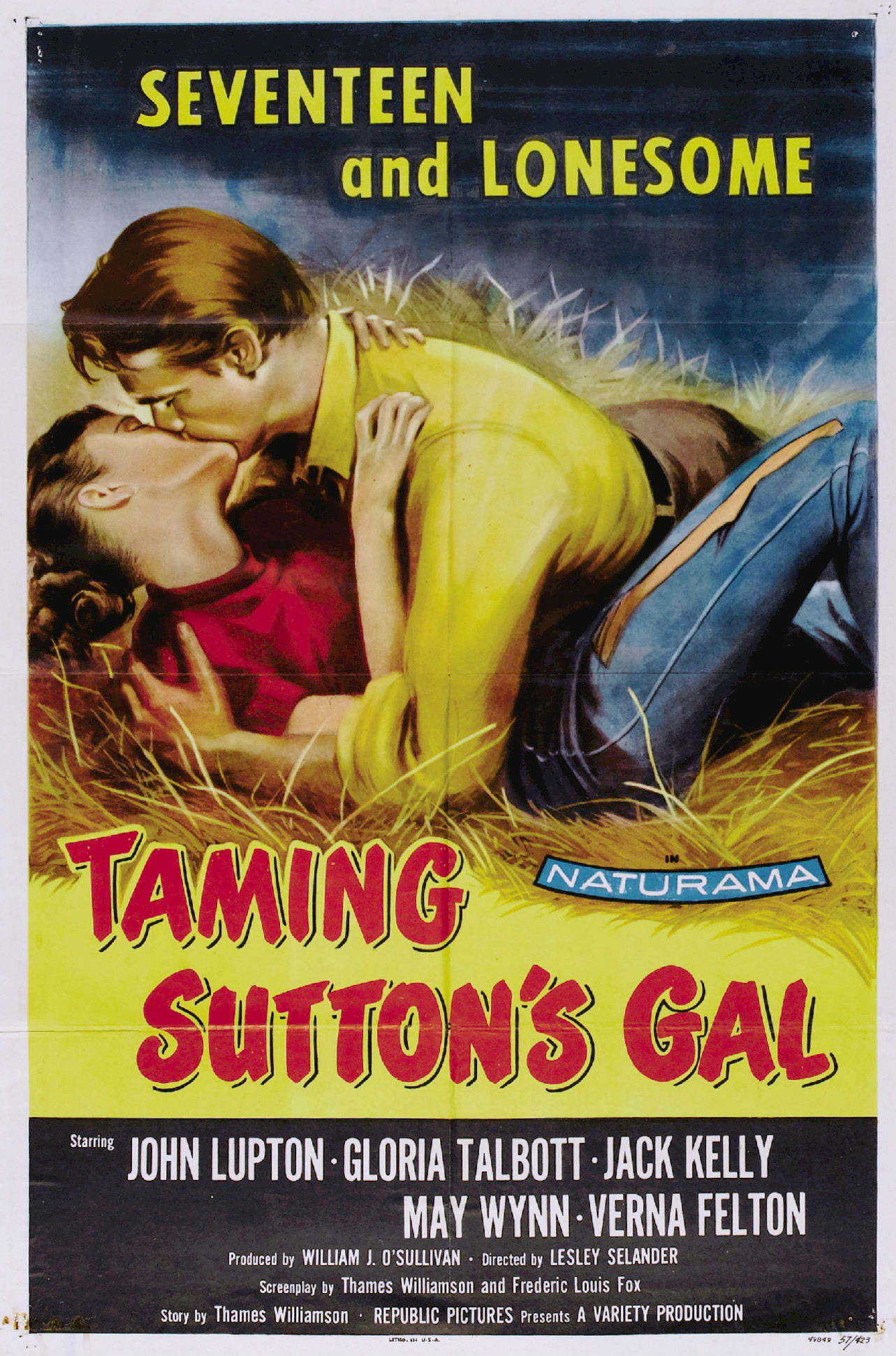
- Theatrical release poster
- Directed by: Lesley Selander
- Screenplay by: Frederick Louis Fox; Thames Williamson
- Story by: Thames Williamson
- Produced by: William J. O'Sullivan
- Starring: John Lupton; Gloria Talbott; Jack Kelly; May Wynn; Verna Felton
- Cinematography: Jack A. Marta
- Edited by: Tony Martinelli
- Production company: Republic Pictures
- Distributed by: Republic Pictures
- Release date: September 15, 1957
- Running time: 71 minutes
- Country: United States
- Language: English

Taming Sutton's Gal is a 1957 American film drama directed by Lesley Selander and written by Frederick Louis Fox and Thames Williamson. The film stars John Lupton, Gloria Talbott, Jack Kelly, May Wynn and Verna Felton. It was released on September 15, 1957, by Republic Pictures.

== Plot ==
Hunting for pheasant, bank teller Frank McClary takes room and board in the Sutton home of 17-year-old girl Lou and her aunt. Living next door are quarreling neighbors Evelyn and Jugger Phelps, an unhappy wife and a jealous husband threatening her harm should she ever leave him.

Evelyn, a former burlesque dancer, gets Frank alone and attempts to seduce him. When she is rejected, she angrily tells her husband that Frank was the aggressor. Jugger confronts him and is given a beating by Frank.

Lou, teased mercilessly by her aunt about finding a man, sees Frank and Evelyn together and gets the wrong idea. Frank's affection for the teenager grows. Evelyn, meanwhile, shoots and wounds her husband after another argument. Evelyn pushes him too far and Jugger kills her. As the police come, Frank and Lou leave together to be married.

== Cast ==
- John Lupton as Frank McClary
- Gloria Talbott as Lou Sutton
- Jack Kelly as Jugger Phelps
- May Wynn as Evelyn Phelps
- Verna Felton as Aunty Sutton
