= One Man's Law =

1940 film

- Directed by: George Sherman
- Screenplay by: Bennett Cohen; Jack Natteford
- Produced by: George Sherman
- Starring: Don "Red" Barry; Janet Waldo; George Cleveland; Dub Taylor; Edmund Cobb; Dick Elliott
- Cinematography: Reggie Lanning
- Edited by: Lester Orlebeck
- Production company: Republic Pictures
- Distributed by: Republic Pictures
- Release date: June 29, 1940
- Running time: 57 minutes
- Country: United States
- Language: English

One Man's Law is a 1940 American Western film directed by George Sherman and written by Bennett Cohen and Jack Natteford. The film stars Don "Red" Barry, Janet Waldo, George Cleveland, Dub Taylor, Edmund Cobb and Dick Elliott. The film was released on June 29, 1940, by Republic Pictures.

== Cast ==
- Don "Red" Barry as Jack Summers
- Janet Waldo as Joyce Logan
- George Cleveland as Judge Wingate
- Dub Taylor as Nevady
- Edmund Cobb as Red Mathews
- Dick Elliott as Prendergast
- James H. McNamara as George Martin
- Robert Frazer as Russell Fletcher
- Rex Lease as Spike Hudkins
- Edward Peil, Sr. as Joel Winters
- Fred Toones as Snowflake
