= George Sherman =

American film director and producer (1908–1991)

- Born: July 14, 1908; New York City, New York, U.S.
- Died: March 15, 1991 (aged 82); Los Angeles, California, U.S.
- Occupations: Film director, producer
- Years active: 1937–1978
- Spouses: Corinne Autra; Cleo Ronson Sherman
- Children: 4

George Sherman (July 14, 1908 – March 15, 1991) was an American film director and producer of low-budget Western films. One obituary said his "credits rival in number those of anyone in the entertainment industry."

== Biography ==
George Sherman was born in New York City on July 14, 1908. At age 14 he sailed aboard the SS Mongolia to Los Angeles, California, where he found work in the mail room at Warner Bros. studios via a film editor friend.

Sherman was credited for working on props on Gentlemen Prefer Blondes (1928).

=== Mack Sennett ===
He worked as an assistant director on the Mack Sennett comedy The Lion and the House (1932), then the short feature Hypnotized (1932). He worked on the shorts A Wrestler's Bride (1933), The Plumber and the Lady (1933), Uncle Jake (1933), See You Tonight (1933), Husbands' Reunion (1933), and The Big Fibber (1933).

=== Assistant director ===
Sherman went to First Division Productions where he assisted on Sunset Range (1935) and Rainbow's End (1935), both starring Hoot Gibson. He went to Monogram for Honeymoon Limited (1935), then Republic for Melody Trail (1935) with Gene Autry, The Hit Parade (1936) and Manhattan Music Box (1937); Sol Lesser for The Mine with the Iron Door (1936), The Border Patrolman (1936), Gangster's Bride (1937), and The Mysterious Stranger (1937). For George Hirliman he worked on Daniel Boone (1936), Millionaire Playboy (1937), Hollywood Cowboy (1937) (on which he reportedly did some uncredited directing), and Windjammer (1937).

=== Director – Republic Pictures ===
In 1937, after working as an assistant director, he directed his first film, Wild Horse Rodeo for Republic Pictures. Sherman would go on to direct scores of low-budget Western films for Republic from 1938 to 1944. These included The Three Mesquiteers films Purple Riders (1938), Outlaws of Sonora (1938), Riders of Black Hills (1938), and Heroes of the Hills (1938).

Sherman directed some Three Mesquiteers films with John Wayne: Pals of the Saddle (1938), Overland Stage Raiders (1938), Santa Fe Stampede (1938), Red River Range (1938), The Night Riders (1939), Three Texas Steers (1939), Wyoming Outlaw (1939), and New Frontier (1939).

Sherman also made some films with Gene Autry: Rhythm of the Saddle (1938), Mexicali Rose (1939), Colorado Sunset (1939), Rovin' Tumbleweeds (1939), and South of the Border (1939).

Sherman directed some Three Mesquiteers films without Wayne: The Kansas Terrors (1939), Cowboys from Texas (1939), Ghost Valley Days (1940), Under Texas Skies (1940), The Trail Blazers (1940), and Lone Star Raiders (1941).

He also did Covered Wagon Days (1940), Rocky Mountain Ranges (1940), One Man's Law (1940), The Tulsa Kid (1940), Frontier Vengeance (1940), Texas Terrors (1940), Wyoming Wildcat (1941), The Phantom Cowboy (1941), Two Gun Sheriff (1941), Desert Bandit (1941), and Kansas Cyclone (1941).

Citadel of Crime (1941) was a rare non-Western. It was followed by The Apache Kid (1941), Death Valley Outdoors (1941), A Missouri Outlaw (1941), Arizona Terrors (1942), Stagecoach Express (1942), Jesse James, Jr. (1942), The Cyclone Kid (1942), and The Sombrero Kid (1942).

There were some non-Westerns:X Marks the Spot (1942), London Blackout Murders (1943), The Purple V (1943), The Mantrap (1943), False Faces (1943), The West Side Kid (1943), A Scream in the Dark (1943), and Mystery Broadcast (1943).

Sherman finished his time at Republic with two Vera Ralston film, both also with Erich von Stroheim and Richard Arlen: The Lady and the Monster (1944), and Storm Over Lisbon (1944). Both became cult movies.

=== Columbia Pictures ===
After his contract ended with Republic Pictures, Sherman directed films for Columbia Pictures from 1945 to 1948. His credits included The Bandit of Sherwood Forest (1945), The Crime Doctor's Courage (1945), The Gentleman Misbehaves (1946), Talk About a Lady (1946), Renegades (1946), Personality Kid (1946), Secret of the Whistler (1946), Last of the Redmen (1947) and Relentless (1948).

=== Universal Pictures ===
Sherman directed for Universal Pictures from 1948 to 1956.

His movies for that studio included Black Bart (1948) and River Lady (1948), both with Yvonne de Carlo and Dan Duryea, and Feudin', Fussin', and A-Fightin' (1948) with Donald O'Connor.

He also directed Larceny (1948), and two Westerns with Howard Duff, Red Canyon (1949), and Calamity Jane and Sam Bass (1949) (the latter based on a story by Sherman). He then did Yes Sir, That's My Baby (1949) and Sword in the Desert (1949), a film about the establishment of Israel which launched the film career of Jeff Chandler.

Sherman returned to Westerns with Comanche Territory (1950), starring Maureen O'Hara and MacDonald Carey, then did Spy Hunt (1950), The Sleeping City (1950), Battle of Powder River (1951) with De Carlo, Target Unknown (1951), The Golden Horde (1951), The Raging Tide (1951), Steel Town (1952), The Battle at Apache Pass (1952) with Chandler, and Back at the Front (1952).

Sherman did a pirate film with Errol Flynn and Maureen O'Hara, Against All Flags (1952). He followed it with The Lone Hand (1952) with Joel McCrea, The Veils of Bagdad (1953) with Victor Mature, War Arrow (1953) with Jeff Chandler and O'Hara, Border River (1954) with McCrea and de Carlo, Johnny Dark (1955) with Tony Curtis, Dawn at Socorro (1954), and Chief Crazy Horse (1955) with Mature.

=== Freelance ===
Sherman began to work outside Universal. He did Count Three and Pray (1955) at Columbia, and The Treasure of Pancho Villa (1955) at RKO.

Sherman directed "Cry Justice" for Screen Director's Playhouse then did Comanche (1956), Reprisal! (1956), The Hard Man (1957), The Last of the Fast Guns (1958), and Ten Days to Tulara (1958). He did Son of Robin Hood (1959), "The Obenauf Story" for Goodyear Theatre (1959), "Killer in Blue" for Manhunt (1959), "Ten Miles to Doomsday" for Alcoa Theatre (1959), and episodes of Rawhide (1959). He did Elfego Baca: Move Along, Mustangers (1959) for Disney.

Sherman returned to features with some films for Sam Katzman: The Flying Fontaines (1959), The Enemy General (1960), and The Wizard of Baghdad (1960). He also did Hell Bent for Leather (1960) with Audie Murphy, None But the Brave (1960), and The Fiercest Heart (1961). None But the Brave was for his own company.

=== Later career ===
Sherman directed a pilot for a TV series A.P.O. 923 (1962). He did episodes of Naked City, Route 66, Daniel Boone and Gentle Ben.

Later features included Wounds of Hunger (1963), Panic Button (1964), La nueva Cenicienta (1964), Búsqueme a esa chica (1964), Vendetta (1965) and Smoky (1966).

His last feature was Big Jake (1971) with John Wayne - Sherman was in ill health during the shoot and reportedly Wayne took over directing some scenes.

Sherman's final credits were episodes of The Family Holvak (1975) and Mobile One.

Sherman retired from filmmaking in 1978.

He died of heart and kidney failure. He was survived by his wife, four daughters and a brother.

=== Awards ===
In 1962 Sherman received the Bronze Wrangler Award from the National Cowboy & Western Heritage Museum for producing The Comancheros. In 1988 he received the Golden Boot Award for his significant contributions to the Western film genre. Sherman died at Cedars Sinai Medical Center in Los Angeles on March 15, 1991, at the age of 82.

=== 2025 Cannes Film Festival tribute ===
in 2025, film director Quentin Tarantino paid tribute to two films directed by George Sherman, Red Canyon and Comanche Territory, by hosting special screenings of the films at the 2025 Cannes Film Festival.

== Filmography ==
- Wild Horse Rodeo (1937)
- The Purple Vigilantes (1938)
- Outlaws of Sonora (1938)
- Riders of the Black Hills (1938)
- Heroes of the Hills (1938)
- Pals of the Saddle (1938)
- Overland Stage Raiders (1938)
- Rhythm of the Saddle (1938)
- Santa Fe Stampede (1938)
- Red River Range (1938)
- Mexicali Rose (1939)
- The Night Riders (1939)
- Three Texas Steers (1939)
- Wyoming Outlaw (1939)
- Colorado Sunset (1939)
- New Frontier (1939)
- The Kansas Terrors (1939)
- Rovin' Tumbleweeds (1939)
- Cowboys from Texas (1939)
- South of the Border (1939)
- Ghost Valley Raiders (1940)
- Covered Wagon Days (1940)
- Rocky Mountain Rangers (1940)
- One Man's Law (1940)
- The Tulsa Kid (1940)
- Under Texas Skies (1940)
- The Trail Blazers (1940)
- Texas Terrors (1940)
- Lone Star Raiders (1940)
- Wyoming Wildcat (1941)
- The Phantom Cowboy (1941)
- Two Gun Sheriff (1941)
- Desert Bandit (1941)
- Kansas Cyclone (1941)
- Citadel of Crime (1941)
- The Apache Kid (1941)
- Death Valley Outlaws (1941)
- A Missouri Outlaw (1941)
- Arizona Terrors (1942)
- Stagecoach Express (1942)
- Jesse James, Jr. (1942)
- The Cyclone Kid (1942)
- The Sombrero Kid (1942)
- X Marks the Spot (1942)
- London Blackout Murders (1943)
- The Purple V (1943)
- Mantrap (1943)
- False Faces (1943)
- West Side Kid (1943)
- A Scream in the Dark (1943)
- Mystery Broadcast (1943)
- The Lady and the Monster (1944)
- Storm Over Lisbon (1944)
- The Crime Doctor's Courage (1945)
- The Bandit of Sherwood Forest (1946)
- The Gentleman Misbehaves (1946)
- Talk About a Lady (1946)
- Renegades (1946)
- Personality Kid (1946)
- The Secret of the Whistler (1946)
- Last of the Redmen (1947)
- Relentless (1948)
- Black Bart (1948)
- River Lady (1948)
- Feudin', Fussin' and A-Fightin' (1948)
- Larceny (1948)
- Red Canyon (1949)
- Calamity Jane and Sam Bass (1949)
- Yes Sir, That's My Baby (1949)
- Sword in the Desert (1949)
- Comanche Territory (1950)
- Spy Hunt (1950)
- The Sleeping City (1950)
- Tomahawk (1951)
- Target Unknown (1951)
- The Golden Horde (1951)
- The Raging Tide (1951)
- Steel Town (1952)
- The Battle at Apache Pass (1952)
- Back at the Front (1952)
- Against All Flags (1952)
- The Lone Hand (1953)
- The Veils of Bagdad (1953)
- War Arrow (1953)
- Border River (1954)
- Johnny Dark (1954)
- Dawn at Socorro (1954)
- Chief Crazy Horse (1955)
- Count Three and Pray (1955)
- The Treasure of Pancho Villa (1955)
- Comanche (1956)
- Reprisal! (1956)
- The Hard Man (1957)
- The Last of the Fast Guns (1958)
- Ten Days to Tulara (1958)
- The Son of Robin Hood (1959)
- The Flying Fontaines (1959)
- Hell Bent for Leather (1960)
- The Enemy General (1960)
- For the Love of Mike (1960)
- The Wizard of Baghdad (1960)
- The Fiercest Heart (1961)
- Wounds of Hunger (1963)
- Panic Button (1964)
- La nueva Cenicienta (1964)
- Búsqueme a esa chica (1964)
- Murieta (1965)
- Daniel Boone: Frontier Trail Rider (1966)
- Smoky (1966)
- Big Jake (1971)
