= Desert Bandit =

1941 film by George Sherman

- Theatrical release poster
- Directed by: George Sherman
- Screenplay by: Bennett Cohen; Eliot Gibbons
- Story by: Bennett Cohen
- Produced by: George Sherman
- Starring: Don "Red" Barry; Lynn Merrick; William Haade; James Gillette; Dick Wessel; Tom Chatterton
- Cinematography: William Nobles
- Edited by: Ray Snyder
- Music by: Cy Feuer
- Production company: Republic Pictures
- Distributed by: Republic Pictures
- Release date: May 24, 1941
- Running time: 56 minutes
- Country: United States
- Language: English

Desert Bandit is a 1941 American Western film directed by George Sherman and written by Bennett Cohen and Eliot Gibbons. The film stars Don "Red" Barry, Lynn Merrick, William Haade, James Gillette, Dick Wessel and Tom Chatterton. It was released on May 24, 1941 by Republic Pictures.

== Cast ==
- Don "Red" Barry as Bob Crandall
- Lynn Merrick as Sue Martin
- William Haade as Largo
- James Gillette as Tim Martin
- Dick Wessel as Hawk
- Tom Chatterton as Captain Banning
- Tom Ewell as Ordway
- Robert Strange as Hatfield
- Charles R. Moore as T-Bone Jones
- Ernie Stanton as Sheriff Warde
