= Johnny Dark =

1954 film by George Sherman

- Theatrical release poster by Reynold Brown
- Directed by: George Sherman
- Written by: Franklin Coen
- Produced by: William Alland
- Starring: Tony Curtis; Piper Laurie; Don Taylor
- Cinematography: Carl E. Guthrie
- Edited by: Edward Curtiss
- Music by: Hans J. Salter
- Color process: Technicolor
- Production company: Universal International Pictures
- Distributed by: Universal Pictures
- Release date: June 22, 1954
- Running time: 86 minutes
- Country: United States
- Language: English
- Box office: $1,650,000

Johnny Dark is a 1954 American action drama sports film directed by George Sherman and starring Tony Curtis, Piper Laurie and Don Taylor. It was produced and distributed by Universal Pictures.

== Plot ==
Johnny Dark and his pal Duke Benson work for Fielding Motors, where owner James Fielding manufactures family-friendly automobiles. Chief engineer Scotty overhears the guys complaining about the company and spots a sportscar design that Johnny and Duke have created.

New employee Liz catches the eye of the guys, but they do not know that she is Fielding's granddaughter. When major stockholder Winston protests the company's unwillingness to create new products for more profits, Scotty reveals that Fielding Motors is developing a new sportscar.

Liz is chosen as the car's designer while Johnny and Duke begin building it. Duke invites her to go dancing, but he becomes jealous when he spots her kissing Johnny, who has discovered Liz's true identity.

Duke is fired after flipping the car during a practice run. He blames it on brake failure, but Johnny feels that it is just an excuse. Liz is disappointed in Johnny for not defending his friend. The car is entered in a Canada-to-Mexico race. Johnny must drive it himself, Duke having been hired to drive another vehicle. Fielding dislikes making a sportscar but accepts Scotty's wager on the race. The car has a breakdown and Johnny must push it into Las Vegas, but when a radio broadcast implies that Fielding does not care, Scotty and a team of mechanics rush to Las Vegas to help Johnny reenter the race and ultimately win it. Liz and Duke help him celebrate.

== Cast ==
- Tony Curtis as Johnny Dark
- Piper Laurie as Liz Fielding
- Don Taylor as Duke Benson
- Paul Kelly as William H. "Scotty" Scott
- Ilka Chase as Abbie Binns
- Sidney Blackmer as James Fielding
- Ruth Hampton as Miss Border to Border
- Russell Johnson as Emory
- Joe Sawyer as Carl Svenson
- Robert Nichols as Smitty
- Pierre Watkin as Ed J. Winston
- Scatman Crothers as Himself
- Ralph Montgomery as Morgan

== Reception ==
In a contemporary review for The New York Times, critic Howard Thompson called Johnny Dark "a mild but rather pleasant little picture" and wrote:

The excellent Technicolor of William Allard's production is even more enhancing to the climactic race, a full-throttle but standard one. ... Pictorially, for that matter, the clean, scrubbed looks of the star trio are no less appealing throughout. Likewise their behavior. Their personal drama, as written by Franklin Coen, just isn't particularly interesting. But under George Sherman's casually good-natured direction, the youngsters and their elders make up some pleasant, uncomplicated people, cheerfully doing what they relish, and no harm done.
