= Rhythm of the Saddle =

1938 film by George Sherman

- Theatrical release poster
- Directed by: George Sherman
- Written by: Paul Franklin
- Produced by: Harry Grey
- Starring: Gene Autry; Smiley Burnette; Pert Kelton
- Cinematography: Jack A. Marta
- Edited by: Lester Orlebeck
- Music by: Raoul Kraushaar (musical director)
- Production company: Republic Pictures
- Distributed by: Republic Pictures
- Release date: November 5, 1938 (U.S.)
- Running time: 58 minutes
- Country: United States
- Language: English

Rhythm of the Saddle is a 1938 American Western film directed by George Sherman and starring Gene Autry, Smiley Burnette, and Pert Kelton. Written by Paul Franklin, the film is about the foreman at a ranch owned by a wealthy rodeo owner who will lose her rodeo contract unless sales improve.

== Plot ==
The owner of the Silver Shadow ranch, Maureen McClune (Peggy Moran), runs the Frontier Week rodeo every year, relying on the financial success of the event to support the ranch. The current rodeo is the most profitable in the event's history, but Maureen is told by the rodeo organizers that she must do even better if she hopes to get her contract renewed. Maureen's main competition is Jack Pomeroy (LeRoy Mason), who owns a rival ranch and a local nightclub and gambling house.

Following a series of "accidents" apparently caused by negligence during the rodeo, Maureen's foreman, Gene Autry (Gene Autry), sets out to prove that Pomeroy is responsible. Maureen's Aunt Hattie (Pert Kelton) wins some money at a roulette table at Pomeroy's club, thanks to Gene's disabling of the rigged mechanisms. Returning home, they are ambushed by Pomeroy's men. Later, Gene breaks into Pomeroy's office to get additional proof of his guilt.

On the last day of the Frontier Week rodeo, Gene rides against one of Pomeroy's men in the final event, a stagecoach race. Aunt Hattie bets everything she has on Gene, hoping to save the ranch. When Gene discovers his friend, Frog Milhouse (Smiley Burnette), making a recording of a proposal to Hattie, he realizes that Frog's recorder could entrap Pomeroy. He instructs Frog to place the device below Pomeroy's seats at the rodeo just before the start of the race.

Pomeroy persuades the sheriff that Gene has committed a murder, but Gene is able to escape. With Frog's help, Gene is able to make it to the race on time. While Gene rides furiously, nearly losing his life, Frog records Pomeroy and his men discussing the "accidents" they created during the rodeo. Gene ends up winning the race, Hattie wins her bet, and Pomeroy and his henchmen are arrested. With their financial worries behind them, Gene and Maureen are free to marry, as are Frog and Hattie.

== Cast ==
- Gene Autry as Gene Autry
- Smiley Burnette as Frog Milhouse
- Pert Kelton as Aunt Hattie
- Peggy Moran as Maurine McClune
- LeRoy Mason as Jack Pomeroy
- Arthur Loft as Cylde Chase
- Ethan Laidlaw as Tex Robinson
- Walter De Palma as Leach, the tall henchman
- Arch Hall Sr. as Rusty, the henchman in the stage
- Eddie Hart as Alex, the henchman
- Eddie Acuff as Dixie Erwin
- Champion as Gene's Horse (uncredited)

== Production ==
=== Stuntwork ===
- Ken Cooper (Gene's double)
- Jack Kirk (Smiley's double)
- Bill Yrigoyen
- Joe Yrigoyen

=== Filming locations ===
- Corriganville Movie Ranch, Simi Valley, California, USA
- Iverson Ranch, 1 Iverson Lane, Chatsworth, Los Angeles, California, USA

=== Soundtrack ===
- "Merry Go Roundup" (Gene Autry, Johnny Marvin, Fred Rose) by Gene Autry (vocal and guitar)
- "She'll Be Comin' Round the Mountain" (Traditional) by Smiley Burnette (a cappella vocal)
- "Oh! Ladies" (Gene Autry, Johnny Marvin, Fred Rose) by Gene Autry (vocal) and Smiley Burnette (vocal and guitar)
- "When Mother Nature Sings Her Lullaby" (Larry Yoell, Glenn Brown) by Gene Autry (vocal and guitar) and the all-girl nightclub orchestra
- "The Old Trail" (Gene Autry, Johnny Marvin, Fred Rose) by Gene Autry and Smiley Burnette with the cowhand musicians
- "Let Me Call You Sweetheart" (Leo Friedman, Beth Slater Whitson) by Gene Autry and Smiley Burnette with an orchestral background
