= Frontier Vengeance =

1940 film

- Theatrical release poster
- Directed by: George Sherman
- Screenplay by: Barry Shipman; Bennett Cohen
- Story by: Bennett Cohen
- Produced by: George Sherman
- Starring: Don "Red" Barry; Betty Moran; George Offerman Jr. Ivan Miller; Obed 'Dad' Pickard; Cindy Walker
- Cinematography: Reggie Lanning
- Edited by: Edward Mann
- Production company: Republic Pictures
- Distributed by: Republic Pictures
- Release date: October 10, 1940
- Running time: 58 minutes
- Country: United States
- Language: English

Frontier Vengeance is a 1940 American Western film directed by George Sherman and written by Barry Shipman and Bennett Cohen. The film stars Don "Red" Barry, Betty Moran, George Offerman Jr., Ivan Miller, Obed 'Dad' Pickard and Cindy Walker. The film was released on October 10, 1940, by Republic Pictures.

== Cast ==
- Don "Red" Barry as Jim Sanders
- Betty Moran as Ruth Hunter
- George Offerman Jr. as Clay Blackburn
- Ivan Miller as Frank Blackburn
- Obed 'Dad' Pickard as Rocky
- Cindy Walker as Singer Cindy
- Kenneth MacDonald as Slash
- Griff Barnett as Joel Hunter
- Yakima Canutt as Henchman Zack
- Jack Lawrence as Henchman Moyer
- Matty Roubert as Henchman Pinto
- Fred Toones as Snowflake
