= Fugitive from Sonora =

1943 film by Howard Bretherton

- Theatrical release poster
- Directed by: Howard Bretherton
- Screenplay by: Norman S. Hall
- Story by: Norman S. Hall
- Produced by: Edward J. White
- Starring: Don "Red" Barry; Wally Vernon; Lynn Merrick; Harry Cording; Ethan Laidlaw; Pierce Lyden
- Cinematography: William Bradford
- Edited by: Richard L. Van Enger
- Music by: Mort Glickman
- Production company: Republic Pictures
- Distributed by: Republic Pictures
- Release date: July 1, 1943
- Running time: 57 minutes
- Country: United States
- Language: English

Fugitive from Sonora is a 1943 American Western film directed by Howard Bretherton and written by Norman S. Hall. The film stars Don "Red" Barry, Wally Vernon, Lynn Merrick, Harry Cording, Ethan Laidlaw and Pierce Lyden. The film was released on July 1, 1943, by Republic Pictures.

== Cast ==
- Don "Red" Barry as Parson Dave Winters / Ted Winters aka Keeno Phillips
- Wally Vernon as Jack Pot Murphy
- Lynn Merrick as Dixie Martin
- Harry Cording as Iron Joe Martin
- Ethan Laidlaw as Hack Roberts
- Pierce Lyden as Henchman Bill Slade
- Gary Bruce as Tom Lawrence
- Kenne Duncan as Henchman R. J. Cole
- Tommy Coats as Henchman Ed
- Frank McCarroll as Henchman Harris
