= The Lone Hand (1953 film) =

1953 film by George Sherman

- Theatrical release poster
- Directed by: George Sherman
- Screenplay by: Joseph Hoffman
- Story by: Irving Ravetch
- Produced by: Howard Christie
- Starring: Joel McCrea; Barbara Hale; Alex Nicol
- Cinematography: Maury Gertsman
- Edited by: Paul Weatherwax
- Color process: Technicolor
- Production company: Universal International Pictures
- Distributed by: Universal Pictures
- Release date: June 26, 1953
- Running time: 80 minutes
- Country: United States
- Language: English
- Box office: $1,150,000 (US)

The Lone Hand is a 1953 American Western film directed by George Sherman and starring Joel McCrea, Barbara Hale and Alex Nicol.

== Plot ==
Zachary Hallock moves to the town of Timberline with his son Josh to start a farm. In town, young Josh meets a boy named Daniel Skaggs who has an older sister, Sarah Jane.

A shootout in the street results in the sheriff's death. A pair of brothers, Jonah and Gus Varden, are continuing their violent reign of terror throughout the region.

Zack is broke. He works hard farming, but doesn't prosper. One day when Sarah Jane brings muffins and they get acquainted, she joins Zack and Josh on a visit to George Hadley's horse farm. Hadley offers to trade two horses for Zack's first grain harvest.

Hadley strongly urges Zack to join the "Regulators," who try to maintain law and order in the area with the sheriff dead. Zack declines, to his son's disappointment. Josh later sees the Vardens ambush and kill a Pinkerton's detective. Josh goes to get Zack and they return to the scene of the shooting. Jonah, hiding nearby, overhears Zack order the boy not to report what he saw.

Zack's wagon, carrying grain for Hadley and driven by Josh, is waylaid by the Vardens, ruining the grain. Knowing now that Zack wants to marry Sarah Jane and is desperate for money, the Vardens approach him about joining them on a robbery. Zack agrees. Josh follows his father the day of the robbery and witnesses the crime.

Zack returns to his farm with a new wagon and team of horses. He lies and tells Sarah, Daniel and Josh that he won the money to buy them in a card game. Sarah Jane marries Zack, but soon suspects his wrongdoing during his numerous disappearances. Zack confesses that he is actually a Pinkerton's man himself, working undercover. He couldn't risk telling her, Josh, or the regulators, because he needed to find out who the ringleader was. He is going to discover who the ringleader is during a last big ambush of a gold shipment.

Hadley is the true criminal ringleader and he kidnaps Josh. During the ambush of the gold shipment, a fight develops and Zach is able to capture Hadley and the remaining Varden brother. His original plan had been to leave Timberline once his work was done, but Zach elects to keep the farm and make a family with Josh and Sarah Jane.

== Cast ==
- Joel McCrea as Zack Hallock
- Barbara Hale as Sarah Jane Skaggs
- Alex Nicol as Jonah Varden
- Jim Arness as Gus Varden
- Charles Drake as George Hadley
- Jimmy Hunt as Joshua Hallock / Narrator
- Roy Roberts as Mr. Skaggs
- Frank Ferguson as Mr. Dunn the Banker
- Wesley Morgan as Daniel Skaggs
- Denver Pyle as Regulator (uncredited)
