= Carson City Cyclone =

1943 film by Howard Bretherton

- Theatrical release poster
- Directed by: Howard Bretherton
- Screenplay by: Norman S. Hall
- Produced by: Edward J. White
- Starring: Don "Red" Barry; Lynn Merrick; Noah Beery Sr. Bryant Washburn; Emmett Lynn; Stuart Hamblen
- Cinematography: William Bradford
- Edited by: Edward Schroeder
- Music by: Mort Glickman
- Production company: Republic Pictures
- Distributed by: Republic Pictures
- Release date: March 3, 1943
- Running time: 55 minutes
- Country: United States
- Language: English

Carson City Cyclone is a 1943 American Western film directed by Howard Bretherton and written by Norman S. Hall and Robert Creighton Williams. The film stars Don "Red" Barry, Lynn Merrick, Noah Beery Sr., Bryant Washburn, Emmett Lynn and Stuart Hamblen. The film was released on March 3, 1943, by Republic Pictures.

== Cast ==
- Don "Red" Barry as Gilbert Phalen
- Lynn Merrick as Linda Wade
- Noah Beery Sr. as Judge Phalen
- Bryant Washburn as Doctor Andrews
- Emmett Lynn as Tombstone Boggs
- Stuart Hamblen as Frank Garrett
- Roy Barcroft as Joe Newman
- Bud Osborne as Sheriff Wells
- Jack Kirk as Henchman Dave
- Bud Geary as Henchman Walker
- Curley Dresden as Henchman Tom Barton
