= Death Valley Outlaws =

1941 film by George Sherman

- Theatrical release poster
- Directed by: George Sherman
- Screenplay by: Jack Lait Jr. Don Ryan
- Story by: Don Ryan
- Produced by: George Sherman
- Starring: Don "Red" Barry; Lynn Merrick; Milburn Stone; Bob McKenzie; Karl Hackett; Rex Lease
- Cinematography: Edgar Lyons
- Edited by: Tony Martinelli
- Production company: Republic Pictures
- Distributed by: Republic Pictures
- Release date: September 26, 1941
- Running time: 56 minutes
- Country: United States
- Language: English

Death Valley Outlaws is a 1941 American Western film directed by George Sherman and written by Jack Lait Jr. and Don Ryan. The film stars Don "Red" Barry, Lynn Merrick, Milburn Stone, Bob McKenzie, Karl Hackett, and Rex Lease. The film was released on September 26, 1941, by Republic Pictures.

== Cast ==
- Don "Red" Barry as Johnny Edwards
- Lynn Merrick as Carolyn Johnson
- Milburn Stone as Jeff
- Bob McKenzie as Doc Blake
- Karl Hackett as Charles W. Gifford
- Rex Lease as Marshal Jim Collins
- Jack Kirk as Tom Johnson
- Michael Owen as Bill Westen
- Fred Toones as Snowflake
