= Jack Marta =

American cinematographer

- Born: March 5, 1903; Laurin, Montana, U.S.
- Died: June 26, 1991 (aged 88); Sheridan, Montana, U.S.
- Occupation: Cinematographer

Jack A. Marta (March 5, 1903 – June 26, 1991) was an American cinematographer who was active in hundreds of movies throughout his life.

== Career ==
Steven Spielberg, who worked with Marta on Duel (1971), recalled: "Jack was a sweetheart. He was just a kind, gentle soul who you know had never worked that fast in his entire career; none of us had, and yet there was nothing he didn’t do or couldn’t do, and he really enjoyed himself."

In 1972, Marta was nominated for the Outstanding Achievement in Cinematography for Entertainment Programming - For a Special or Feature Length Program Made for Television.

== Filmography ==
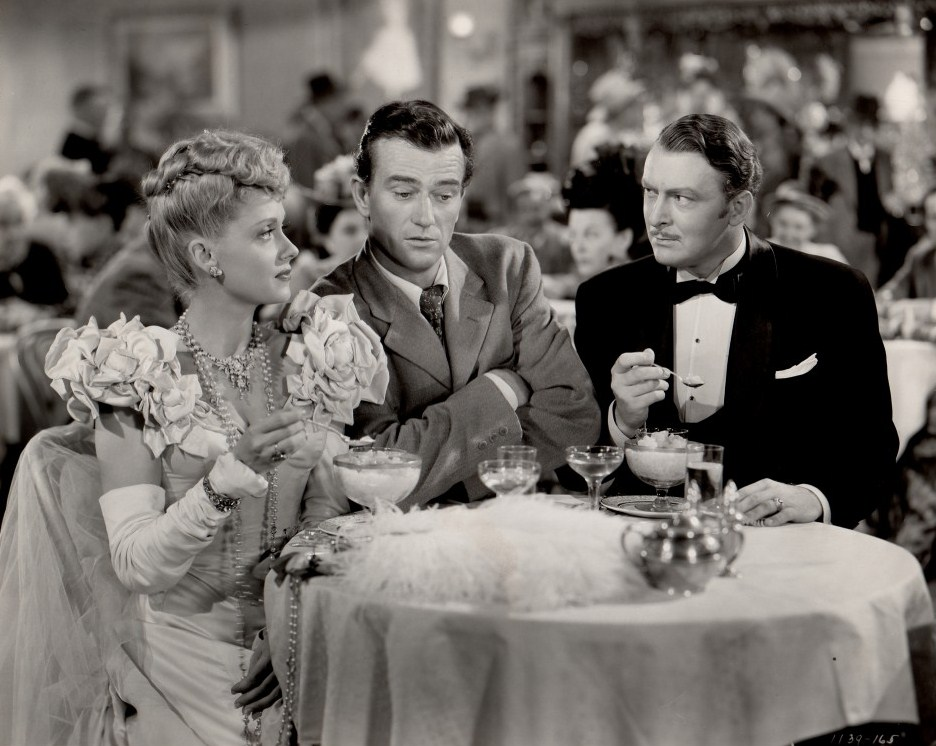
Marta was cinematographer for In Old Oklahoma (1943), featuring Martha Scott, John Wayne and Albert Dekker

- Hawaii Five-O
- Billy Jack Goes to Washington
- The Master Gunfighter
- Chase
- Partners in Crime
- Framed
- The Trial of Billy Jack
- Walking Tall
- You’ll Like My Mother
- Emergency!
- How to Steal an Airplane
- Duel
- A Howling in the Woods
- Company of Killers
- The Deadly Dream
- The Birdmen
- The City
- Plaza Suite
- The Name of the Game
- Dial Hot Line
- The Challenges
- Silent Night, Lonely Night
- Any Second Now
- Dundee and the Culhane
- The Perils of Pauline
- T.H.E. Cat
- The Green Hornet
- The Rat Patrol
- The Monroes
- Batman
- Cat Ballou
- Route 66
- Angel Baby
- Tallahassee 7000
- Earth vs the Spider
- The Man Who Died Twice
- Girl in the Woods
- War of the Colossal Beast
- Man or Gun
- The Bonnie Parker Story
- Juvenile Jungle
- Young and Wild
- The Notorious Mr. Monks
- Gunfire at Indian Gap
- The Crooked Circle
- Panama Sal
- The Wayward Girl
- Taming Sutton's Gal
- The Last Stagecoach West
- Beginning of the End
- The Lawless Eighties
- Spoilers of the Forest
- Affair in Reno
- Duel at Apache Wells
- Lisbon
- The Maverick Queen
- Come Next Spring
- The Last Command
- Timberjack
- Hell's Outpost
- The Shanghai Story
- Jubilee Trail
- Fair Wind to Java
- A Perilous Journey
- Ride the Man Down
- Montana Belle
- The WAC from Walla Walla
- Woman of the North Country
- The Fabulous Senorita
- Oklahoma Annie
- Pals of the Golden West
- Honeychile
- South of Caliente
- In Old Amarillo
- Oh! Susanna
- Spoilers of the Plains
- North of the Great Divide
- Sunset in the West
- Trigger, Jr.
- Rock Island Trail
- Belle of Old Mexico
- The Golden Stallion
- The Kid from Cleveland
- Brimstone
- Hellfire
- The Last Bandit
- The Far Frontier
- The Plunderers
- Night Time in Nevada
- Eyes of Texas
- The Gallant Legion
- Under California Stars
- Bill and Coo The Gay Ranchero
- On the Old Spanish Trail
- Springtime in the Sierras
- Bells of San Angelo
- Apache Rose
- That Brennan Girl
- Earl Carroll Sketchbook
- In Old Sacramento
- Murder in the Music Hall
- Dakota
- An Angel Comes to Brooklyn
- Mexicana
- Hitchhike to Happiness
- Earl Carroll Vanities
- Brazil
- Port of 40 Thieves
- Song of Nevada
- The Yellow Rose of Texas
- Man from Frisco
- My Best Gal
- Whispering Footsteps
- In Old Oklahoma
- Nobody's Darling
- The West Side Kid
- Someone to Remember
- Bordertown Gun Fighters
- Tahiti Honey
- Hit Parade of London Blackout Murders
- Ridin' Down the Canyon
- Heart of the Golden West
- X Marks the Spot
- Flying Tigers
- In Old California
- The Girl from Alaska
- Sleepytime Gal
- Cowboy Serenade
- Red River Valley
- A Missouri Outlaw
- Sierra Sue
- Down Mexico Way
- Ice-Capades
- Mountain Moonlight
- Puddin' Head
- Lady from Louisiana
- Sis Hopkins
- A Man Betrayed
- Petticoat Politics
- Robin Hood of the Pecos
- Behind the News
- The Border Legion
- Hit Parade of 1941
- Colorado
- Ride, Tenderfoot, Ride
- Earl of Puddlestone
- Girl from God's Country
- Grand Ole Opry
- Women in War
- Rocky Mountain Rangers
- Dark Command
- Pioneers of the West
- Thou Shalt Not Kill
- Saga of Death Valley
- Main Street Lawyer
- Smuggled Cargo
- Wall Street Cowboy
- Should Husbands Work?
- Mickey the Kid
- S.O.S. Tidal Wave
- My Wife's Relatives
- Blue Montana Skies
- Forged Passport
- The Night Riders
- Southward Ho
- Rough Riders' Round-up
- Pride of the Navy
- Fighting Thoroughbreds
- Red River Range
- Come On, Rangers
- Rhythm of the Saddle
- I Stand Accused
- The Night Hawk
- Man from Music Mountain
- A Desperate Adventure
- Ladies in Distress
- Under Western Stars
- Invisible Enemy
- The Higgins Family
- II Stardust
- King of the Newsboys
- Born to Be Wild
- Outside of Paradise
- Manhattan Merry-Go-Round
- The Perfect Specimen
- Heart of the Rockies
- The Sheik Steps Out
- Public Cowboy No. 1
- Range Defenders
- It Could Happen to You!
- Michael O'Halloran
- Jim Hanvey, Detective
- Navy Blues
- Hit the Saddle
- Circus Girl
- Paradise Express
- Larceny on the Air
- The Riders of the Whistling Skull
- The Mandarin Mystery
- The Bold Caballero
- Ghost-Town Gold
- Bulldog Edition
- The Gentleman from Louisiana
- Mariners of the Sky/Navy Born
- Hearts in Bondage
- The Girl from Mandalay
- The House of a Thousand Candles (1936)
- King of the Pecos
- The Leathernecks Have Landed
- Dancing Feet
- The Leavenworth Case
- Hitch Hike Lady
- The Fighting Marines
- Sagebrush Troubadour
- Harmony Lane
- 1,000 Dollars a Minute
- Confidential
- Streamline Express
- Behind the Green Lights
- The Red Dance
- What Price Glory
