= Ragtime Cowboy Joe (film) =

- Theatrical release poster
- Directed by: Ray Taylor
- Screenplay by: Sherman L. Lowe
- Produced by: Joseph Gershenson
- Starring: Johnny Mack Brown; Fuzzy Knight; Nell O'Day; Dick Curtis; Lynn Merrick; Walter Soderling
- Cinematography: Jerome Ash
- Edited by: Paul Landres
- Production company: Universal Pictures
- Distributed by: Universal Pictures
- Release date: September 20, 1940
- Running time: 68 minutes
- Country: United States
- Language: English

Ragtime Cowboy Joe is a 1940 American Western film directed by Ray Taylor and written by Sherman L. Lowe. The film stars Johnny Mack Brown, Fuzzy Knight, Nell O'Day, Dick Curtis, Lynn Merrick and Walter Soderling. The film was released on September 20, 1940, by Universal Pictures.

== Cast ==
- Johnny Mack Brown as Steve Logan
- Fuzzy Knight as Joe Bushberry
- Nell O'Day as Helen Osborne
- Dick Curtis as Bo Gilman
- Lynn Merrick as Mary Curtiss
- Walter Soderling as Virgil Parker
- Roy Barcroft as Putt Lewis
- Harry Tenbrook as Del Porter
- George Plues as Roy Gordon
- Ed Cassidy as Sheriff
- Buck Moulton as Buck Edwards
- Harold Goodwin as Duncan
- Wilfred Lucas as Sam Osborne
- William Gould as Mansfield
- Bob O'Connor as Bartender
- Bud Osborne as Clements
- Slim Whitaker as Foreman
- Jack Rube Clifford as Clayton
- Veola Vonn as Singer
