= The New World (1957 film) =

- Directed by: René Cardona
- Starring: Lorena Velázquez; René Cardona Jr.; Rafael Alcayde
- Production company: Cinematográfica Latino Americana
- Release date: 7 August 1957
- Running time: 90 minutes
- Country: Mexico
- Language: Spanish

The New World (Spanish: Un mundo nuevo) is a 1957 Mexican drama film directed by René Cardona and starring Lorena Velázquez, René Cardona Jr. and Rafael Alcayde.

== Cast ==
In alphabetical order

- Rafael Alcayde
- Arturo Arias
- René Cardona Jr.
- René Cardona
- Ángel Di Stefani
- Manuel Dondé
- John Kelly
- José Pulido
- Antonio Raxel
- Lorena Velázquez

== Bibliography ==
- Victoria Ruétalo & Dolores Tierney. Latsploitation, Exploitation Cinemas, and Latin America. Routledge, 2009.
