= A.P.O. 923 =

1973 television film by John L. Moxey

- Genre: Military fiction, slice of life
- Written by: Gene Roddenberry
- Directed by: George Sherman
- Starring: Ralph Taeger; Pat Harrington Jr.; James Stacy
- Music by: Leith Stevens
- Country of origin: United States
- Original language: English

Production
- Executive producer: William Sackheim
- Producer: Gene Roddenberry
- Cinematography: Scotty Welbourne
- Editor: Frederick Y. Smith
- Running time: 55 minutes
- Production company: Screen Gems

Original release
- Network: CBS
- Release: 1962

A.P.O. 923 was a proposed television series developed by Gene Roddenberry. A single episode "Operation Shangri-La" was filmed in 1962 as a pilot episode. Set during World War II, the series would have focused on slice of life stories of American servicemen stationed in the South Pacific.

== Plot ==
The episode begins with a Colonel trying to award the Silver Star to James T. Irvine. Irvine rejects the medal, and shows the Colonel a photograph of a Japanese soldier with his wife and child that he found in the pocket of the last enemy soldier he killed. As Irvine tries to explain his growing anti-war attitude, the camp is attacked by the Japanese infantry. After the skirmish Irvine looks through the pockets of one of the soldiers he killed and finds a fresh apple. Upon speaking to the Asian bartender, Tapioca, he determines that there must be a place where they are grown up the mountain. The next day he goes AWOL to try to find where the apples are grown. After Captain Pike and Lt. Jellicoe trek up the mountain to find him. Soon after finding him, they encounter a small village of ethnic Chinese refugees who do not want to be part of the war, but who nevertheless trade with Japanese soldiers. The Chinese elders offer the Americans food and women to leave them alone. The Americans surmise that the Japanese already know that they are in the village and will raze it as soon as they get the chance. Once Japanese soldiers are spotted approaching, the Americans quickly kill them off, keeping the Chinese village safe.

== Characters ==
Roddenberry envisaged two main characters for his show, a pilot and co-pilot named Phil Pike and Eddie Jellicoe. The pilot would be a man in his mid-thirties well experiences in war and women. A "Pappy Boyington" type. His co-pilot, Jellicoe, would be a man in his early 20s, just out of college and "as intent regarding life as he was ignorant of it". Other characters would include a flight surgeon, a squadron commander, a general and admiral and several enlisted men. The final pilot would end up having three main characters, each in a different branch of the military: Air Force Captain Philip Pike, described as a strong in charge captain, Navy Lieutenant Edward Jellicoe, whose "emotions were always at the forefront", Army Lieutenant James T. Irvine, the "smart" character.

== Production ==
The idea for the series came to Roddenberry while at a party in late 1960. Someone had mentioned that no one had done anything with James A. Michener's Tales of the South Pacific; Roddenberry was about to mention the musical, film and TV adaptions, when it struck him that these were only adaptations of one story in the collection, one that he considered the weakest and most undramatic at that. Roddenberry, himself a veteran of the Pacific War, felt that it would be interesting to have a show that would focus on the everyday lives of soldiers, sailors and airmen stationed in the South Pacific during the war. He envisioned an episodic series with his characters facing challenges incident to military life like dear John letters, fighting boredom, USO shows, finding the Commanding Officers jeep, the operation of a radio shack, setting up thatched roof officers clubs etc. He cited Mister Roberts, the first half of The Caine Mutiny and Don't Go Near the Water as inspirations.

Roddenberry originally intended on calling the series Wild Blue, he intended to base the show around the flight crew of a "weird and rickety" B-17, nicknamed "The Beast". The series would follow its adventures in much the same way as other shows and novels would follow the crew of naval vessels.

== Legacy ==
The three basic character archetypes, their interactions and names, would later influence the creation of Captains Christopher Pike, James T. Kirk, Dr. Leonard McCoy and Spock.

== Sources ==
- Alexander, David (1995). Star Trek Creator: The Authorized Biography of Gene Roddenberry. New York: Roc. ISBN 0-451-45440-5.
