= Lynn Merrick =

American actress (1919–2007)

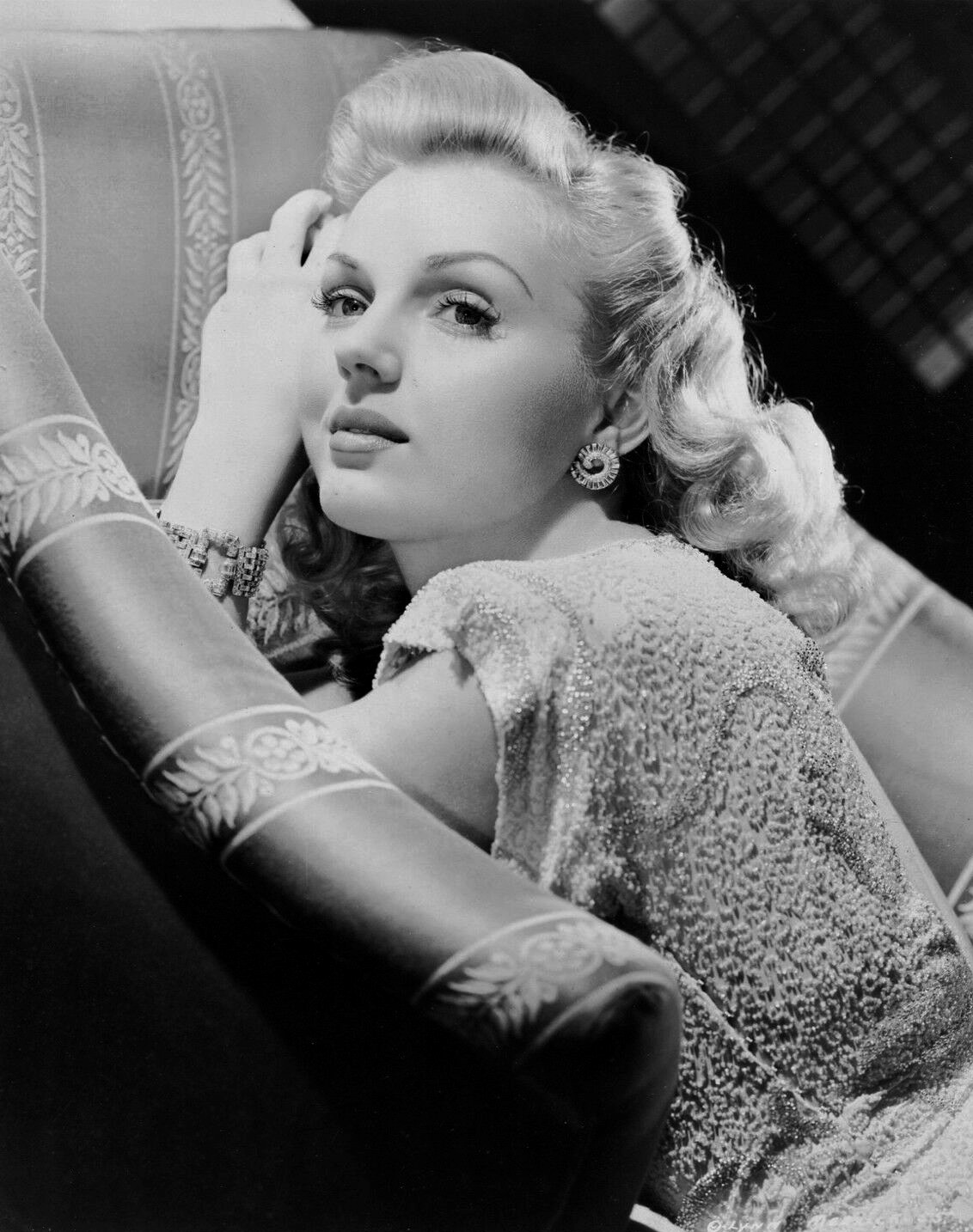
- Publicity Photo of Lynn Merrick
- Born: Marilyn Llewelling; November 19, 1919; Fort Worth, Texas, U.S.
- Died: March 25, 2007 (aged 87); West Palm Beach, Florida U.S.
- Occupation: Actress
- Years active: 1940–1955
- Spouses: Conrad Nagel (m. 1945; div. 1948) Robert Goelet, Jr. (m. 1949; div. 1956)
- Family: Goelet family

Lynn Merrick (born Marilyn Llewelling; November 19, 1919 – March 25, 2007) was an American actress who appeared in over 40 films during the 1940s, mainly for Columbia and Republic Studios.

== Life and career ==
Merrick was born Marilyn Llewelling on November 19, 1919, in Fort Worth, Texas.

In the 1930s, Merrick studied acting and worked as a model after moving to California.

In 1940, Merrick was one of thirteen women selected by the Motion Picture Publicists Association as a "Baby Star", a selection process which was meant to highlight the most promising new film stars. She made the bulk of her films during the 1940s, starring in 22 feature films for Republic Pictures; 16 of these were Don Barry westerns.

Merrick's first Barry film was Two Gun Sheriff and her last was Fugitive from Sonora. She later worked for Columbia Pictures, where she starred in films alongside Richard Dix, Chester Morris, and Warner Baxter. Merrick retired from films after Escape from Terror (1955), starring and directed by Jackie Coogan.

In 1948, Merrick and her husband at the time, Conrad Nagel, appeared in summer stock theater in Pennsylvania, New York, and Connecticut. After retiring from acting, Merrick was an executive with the Barbizon School of Modeling.

== Personal life and death ==
Merrick was married and divorced twice. Her first marriage was to Nagel. They received an interlocutory decree on March 26, 1947, and the divorce became final on August 26, 1948.

On October 26, 1949, Merrick married producer Robert Goelet Jr. in Europe. Both unions were childless. In 1950, Merrick received emergency treatment at Santa Monica Hospital after taking an overdose of sleeping pills. A news story distributed by International News Service described the overdose as "the climax to a spat with her husband, wealthy Robert Goelet."

Merrick died on March 25, 2007, at age 87, at her home in West Palm Beach, Florida. Her remains were cremated and her ashes scattered.

== Filmography ==
Year	Title	Role	Notes
1940	'Til We Meet Again	Fussy Woman's Daughter	Uncredited
1940	Dr. Christian Meets the Women	Kity Browning	(as Marilyn Merrick)
1940	Flight Angels	Marilyn	(as Marilyn Merrick)
1940	Ragtime Cowboy Joe	Mary Curtiss	(as Marilyn Merrick)
1941	A Missouri Outlaw	Virginia Randall	
1941	Death Valley Outlaws	Carolyn Johnson	
1941	The Apache Kid	Barbara Taylor	
1941	Kansas Cyclone	Martha Ming	
1941	Desert Bandit	Sue Martin	
1941	The Gay Vagabond	Betty Dixon	
1941	Two Gun Sheriff	Ruth Norton	
1941	Sis Hopkins	Phyllis	
1942	Outlaws of Pine Ridge	Ann Hollister	
1942	The Sombrero Kid	Dorothy Russell	
1942	The Cyclone Kid	Mary Phillips	
1942	Jesse James, Jr.	Joan Perry	
1942	Stageeoach Express	Ellen Bristol	
1942	Arizona Terrors	Lila Adams	
1942	Youth on Parade	Emmy Lou Piper	
1943	Doughboys in Ireland	Gloria Gold	
1943	Days of Old Cheyenne	Nancy Carlyle	
1943	Dangerous Blondes	Mary Ralston	
1943	Is Everybody Happy?	Ann	
1943	Fugitive from Sonora	Dixie Martin	
1943	Carson City Cyclone	Linda Wade	
1943	Dead Man's Gulch	Mary Logan	
1943	Mountain Rhythm	Linda Weaver	
1943	The Crime Doctor's Strangest Case	Ellen Trotter	
1944	Meet Miss Bobby Socks	Helen Taylor	
1944	Nine Girls	Eve Sharon	
1944	Stars on Parade	Dorothy Dean	
1944	Swing Out the Blues	Penelope Carstairs	
1945	A Guy, a Gal and a Pal	Helen Carter	
1945	Boston Blackie Booked on Suspicion	Constance Gloria Mannard	
1945	Voice of the Whistler	Joan Martin Sinclair	
1945	Blonde from Brooklyn	Susan Parker aka Susanna Bellwither	
1946	Dangerous Business	Lizbeth Ellsworth	
1946	A Close Call for Boston Blackie	Geraldine 'Gerry' Peyton	
1947	Down to Earth	Muse	
1948	I Love Trouble	Mrs. Johnson	
1954	Escape from Terror	Lee Brooks	(final film role)
