= Red River Range =

1938 film by George Sherman

- Theatrical poster
- Directed by: George Sherman
- Written by: Betty Burbridge; Stanley Roberts; Luci Ward (also story)
- Based on: Based on characters by William Colt MacDonald
- Produced by: William A. Berke
- Starring: John Wayne; Ray Corrigan; Max Terhune; Polly Moran
- Cinematography: Jack A. Marta
- Edited by: Lester Orlebeck
- Music by: William Lava
- Distributed by: Republic Pictures
- Release date: December 22, 1938
- Running time: 56 minutes
- Country: United States
- Language: English

Red River Range is a 1938 "Three Mesquiteers" Western film starring John Wayne, Ray Corrigan, Max Terhune, and Polly Moran. Wayne played the lead in eight of the fifty-one movies in the popular series. The director was George Sherman.

== Plot summary ==
The Cattlemen's Association has called in the Mesquiteers to find cattle rustlers. They get Tex Riley to pose as Stony so Stony can arrive posing as a wanted outlaw. This gets Stony into the gang of rustlers and he alerts Tucson and Lullaby as to the next raid. But Hartley is on hand and unknown to anyone is the rustler's boss and he joins the posse with a plan that will do away with the Mesquiteers.

== Cast ==
- John Wayne as Stony Brooke
- Ray Corrigan as Tucson Smith
- Max Terhune as Lullaby Joslin
- Elmer as Elmer (Lullaby Joslin's Ventriloquist Dummy) (uncredited)
- Polly Moran as Mrs. Maxwell
- Lorna Gray as Jane Mason
- Kirby Grant as Tex Reilly
- Sammy McKim as Tommy Jones
- William Royle as Payne
- Perry Ivins as Hartley
- Stanley Blystone as Randall
- Lenore Bushman as Evelyn Maxwell
- Burr Caruth as Pop Mason
- Roger Williams as Sheriff Wood
- Earl Askam as Henchman Morton
- Olin Francis as Henchman Kenton
- Chuck Baldra as Dude Ranch Cowhand (uncredited)
- Ed Cassidy as Marshal (uncredited)
- Bert Dillard as Cattleman (uncredited)
- Jack Montgomery as Cattleman (uncredited)
- Theodore Lorch as Rancher (uncredited)
- Frank O'Connor as Photographer (uncredited)
- Curley Dresden as Rustler (uncredited)
- Robert McKenzie as Justice of the Peace (uncredited)
- Joe Whitehead as Henchman (uncredited)
- Fred 'Snowflake' Toones as Bellhop (uncredited)
- Al Taylor as Slick (Henchman) (uncredited)
- John Beach as Rustler (uncredited)

== Copyright status ==
The copyright for Red River Range was renewed in 1968.

== See also ==
- John Wayne filmography
