= The Cyclone Kid (1942 film) =

1942 film by George Sherman

- Theatrical release poster
- Directed by: George Sherman
- Screenplay by: Richard Murphy
- Produced by: George Sherman
- Starring: Don "Red" Barry; John James; Lynn Merrick; Alex Callam; Joel Friedkin; Slim Andrews
- Cinematography: Bud Thackery
- Edited by: Edward Schroeder
- Music by: Cy Feuer
- Production company: Republic Pictures
- Distributed by: Republic Pictures
- Release date: May 31, 1942
- Running time: 57 minutes
- Country: United States
- Language: English

The Cyclone Kid is a 1942 American Western film directed by George Sherman and written by Richard Murphy. The film stars Don "Red" Barry, John James, Lynn Merrick, Alex Callam, Joel Friedkin and Slim Andrews. The film was released on May 31, 1942, by Republic Pictures.

== Plot ==
Two estranged brothers in Dakota territory in the Old West, one a hired gun known as "The Cyclone Kid", join forces with a band of homesteaders to challenge a cattle baron named Big Jim Johnson who has poisoned the town's water to force the ranchers to sell their land to him.

== Cast ==
- Don "Red" Barry as Johnny Dawson aka Cyclone Kid
- John James as Doctor Bill Dawson
- Lynn Merrick as Mary Phillips
- Alex Callam as Big Jim Johnson
- Joel Friedkin as Judge Phillips
- Slim Andrews as Arkansas Slim
- Rex Lease as Henchman Ben Rankin
- Joe McGuinn as Henchman Ames
- Monte Montague as Sheriff
- Frank LaRue as Marshal Jack
