= Doris Schroeder =

American novelist

- Born: Doris Mae Schroeder; February 7, 1893; Far Rockaway, Queens, New York, U.S.
- Died: January 4, 1981 (aged 87); Sacramento, California, U.S.
- Other name: Doris S. Green
- Occupation: Screenwriter
- Years active: 1913–1952
- Spouse: George Green (div.)
- Relatives: Edward Schroeder (brother)

Doris Schroeder (February 7, 1893 – January 4, 1981) was an American screenwriter and publicity woman.

== Biography ==
Born in New York, Doris was the daughter of Edward Schroeder and Phoebe Kent. She attended Brooklyn Girls High School before becoming a stenographer for Rollin S. Sturgeon and then a scenario writer for Vitagraph and Universal.

Her first screenplay was the now-lost Heart of a Jewess. During the 1920s, Schroeder specialized in "women's pictures" for directors like Lois Weber. Schroeder concentrated on Westerns, together with Harrison Jacobs she wrote several entries in the Hopalong Cassidy series. During the 1950s and 1960s, she wrote many television and film tie-in young adult novels for Western Publishing.

Her brother, Edward Schroeder, eventually moved to Hollywood and became a prolific film editor; he, too, worked on Westerns. Her husband, George Green, was a screenwriter and producer who also worked in the Western genre. The pair divorced in 1944.

== Film credits ==
- No Sweets (1913, story)
- The Lion's Bride (1913, writer)
- Brandon's Last Ride (1914, scenario)
- Bunny's Mistake (1914, scenario)
- Kidding the Boss (1914, story)
- The Power to Forgive (1914, story)
- Her Gethsemane (1915, story)
- Barriers of Prejudice (1915, writer)
- Edged Tools (1917, scenario)
- My Fighting Gentleman (1917, scenario)
- Tony America (1918, scenario)
- The Price of Applause (1918, scenario)
- A Mother's Secret (1918, scenario)
- The Girl Who Wouldn't Quit (1918, scenario)
- My Unmarried Wife (1918, scenario)
- The Wolf and His Mate (1918, scenario)
- The Trembling Hour (1919, scenario)
- Under Suspicion (1919/I, scenario)
- My Lady's Ankle (1920, scenario)
- In Folly's Trail (1920, scenario)
- The Girl in the Rain (1920, scenario)
- A Tokyo Siren (1920, scenario)
- The Path She Chose (1920, scenario)
- The Gilded Dream (1920, writer)
- The Adorable Savage (1920, writer)
- A Parisian Scandal (1921, writer)
- Nobody's Fool (1921, writer)
- The Rowdy (1921, writer)
- Opened Shutters (1921, writer)
- Short Skirts (1921, writer)
- Reputation (1921, writer)
- Cheated Love (1921, writer)
- The Smart Sex (1921, writer)
- Playing With Fire (1921/I, writer)
- Forsaking All Others (1922, scenario)
- The Altar Stairs (1922, scenario)
- The Lavender Bath Lady (1922, writer)
- The Married Flapper (1922, writer)
- Her Night of Nights (1922, writer)
- Kissed (1922, writer)
- The Dangerous Little Demon (1922, writer)
- Don't Get Personal (1922, writer)
- A Chapter in Her Life (1923, adaptation)
- West of the Water Tower (1923, writer)
- The Call of the Canyon (1923, writer)
- The Six-Fifty (1923, writer)
- To the Last man (1923, writer)
- Sawdust (1923, writer)
- West of the Water Tower (1924, writer-scenarist)
- My Lady of Whims (1925, writer)
- The Silent Avenger (1927, adaptation)
- Naughty Nanette (1927, writer)
- The Princess on Broadway (1927, writer)
- Salvation Jane (1927, writer)
- Crimson Romance (1934, additional dialogue)
- Bar 20 Rides Again (1935, adaptation and screenplay)
- The Eagle's Brood (1935, screenplay)
- Hop-Along Cassidy (1935, writer)
- Three on the Trail (1936, screenplay)
- Call of the Prairie (1936, screenplay)
- Heart of the West (1936, screenplay)
- Wall Street Cowboy (1939, story)
- Texas Terrors (1940, original screenplay)
- Prairie Law (1940, screenplay)
- Bullet Code (1940, screenplay)
- Legion of the Lawless (1940, screenplay)
- Oklahoma Renegades (1940, writer)
- Gangs of Sonora (1941, original screenplay)
- The Phantom Cowboy (1941, original screenplay)
- Two Gun Sheriff (1941, screenplay)
- A Missouri Outlaw (1941, writer)
- Kansas Cyclone (1941, writer)
- Pirates of the Prairie (1942, screenplay)
- Arizona Terrors (1942, story and screenplay)
- Stagecoach Express (1942, story)
- Westward Ho (1942, writer)
- Bandits of the Badlands (1945, story and screenplay)
- Death Valley (1946, writer)
- Days of Buffalo Bill (1946, writer)
- Dangerous Venture (1947, screenplay)
- Fool's Gold (1947, screenplay)
- False Paradise (1948, additional dialogue)
- Strange Gamble (1948, screenplay)
- Sinister Journey (1948, screenplay)
- The Gay Amigo (1949, original screenplay)
- The Lone Ranger (1949–1950, 3 episodes)
- Bar 20 Rides Again (1950, archive footage, dialogue)
- Three on a Trail (1950, dialogue, archive footage)
- Heart of the West (1950, dialogue, archive footage)
- Border Justice (1951, dialogue, archive footage)
- Danger Trail (1951, dialogue, archive footage)
- Prairie Vengeance (1951, dialogue, archive footage)

== Published works ==
- Annie Oakley in Danger at Diablo (1955)
- Rin Tin Tin and Call to Danger (1957)
- Annie Oakley in the Ghost Town Secret (1957)
- Annie Oakley in Double Trouble (1958)
- Walt Disney's Spin and Marty Trouble at Triple-R (1958)
- Gunsmoke (1958)
- Lassie: Forbidden Valley (1959)
- The Lennon Sisters the Secret of Holiday Island: The Secret of Holiday Island (1960)
- Walt Disney's Annette: Sierra Summer (1960)
- Walt Disney's Annette, the Desert Inn Mystery (1961)
- Walt Disney's Annette and the Mystery at Moonstone Bay (1962)
- The Beverly Hillbillies: The Saga of Wildcat Creek (1962)
- Walt Disney's Annette and the Mystery at Smugglers' Cove (1963)
- Patty Duke and Mystery Mansion (1964)
- Walt Disney's Annette and the Mystery of Medicine Wheel (1964)
- Patty Duke and the Adventure of the Chinese Junk (1966)
- Lassie Forbidden Valley (1969)
