= Richard Murphy (screenwriter) =

American screenwriter, film director, film producer

- Born: May 8, 1912; Boston, Massachusetts, U.S.
- Died: May 19, 1993 (aged 81); Los Angeles, California, U.S.
- Resting place: Holy Cross Cemetery, Culver City, California, U.S.
- Occupation(s): Screenwriter; Film director Film producer

Richard Murphy (May 8, 1912 – May 19, 1993) was an American screenwriter, film director and producer. His screenplays for Boomerang (1947) and The Desert Rats (1953) were nominated for the Academy Award for Best Adapted Screenplay and Best Original Screenplay, respectively.

== Biography ==
Born in Boston, Massachusetts, Murphy worked for Literary Digest in the 1930s before leaving in 1937 to work in the short film department at MGM. Murphy's first screenwriting credit was for providing the story for Back in the Saddle, a 1941 Gene Autry western.

While in the Army Air Forces during World War II, Murphy reached the rank of captain seeing action in the Pacific theater countries of New Guinea and the Philippines. Murphy returned to the States and started working for 20th Century Fox. In 1947 he wrote the award-winning film Boomerang. He received the first of two Oscar nominations for this screenplay, with his second in 1953 for the World War II film The Desert Rats. He also directed a few films before moving into television in the 1960s when he wrote and created television series. Murphy's last screenplay was for The Kidnapping of the President in 1980.

== Filmography ==
=== Writer ===
- Life in Sometown, U.S.A. (1938)
- Back in the Saddle (1941)
- The Singing Hill (1941)
- Flying Blind (1941)
- The Apache Kid (1941)
- Jesse James, Jr. (1942)
- The Cyclone Kid (1942)
- I Live on Danger (1942)
- Wildcat (1942)
- X Marks the Spot (1942)
- Wrecking Crew (1942)
- Boomerang! (1947)
- Deep Waters (1948)
- Cry of the City (1948)
- Slattery's Hurricane (1949)
- Panic in the Streets (1950)
- You're in the Navy Now (1951)
- Les Misérables (1952)
- The Desert Rats (1953)
- Broken Lance (1954)
- Three Stripes in the Sun (1955)
- Compulsion (1959)
- The Last Angry Man (1959)
- The Wackiest Ship in the Army (1960)
- The Mystery of the Chinese Junk (1967)
- Felony Squad (73 episodes, 1966–1969)
- The Kidnapping of the President (1980)

=== Director ===
- Three Stripes in the Sun (1955)
- The Wackiest Ship in the Army (1960)

=== Producer ===
- The Mystery of the Chinese Junk (1967)

== Awards and nominations ==
Year	Result	Award	Category	Film or series
1949	Nominated	Writers Guild of America Award	The Robert Meltzer Award (Screenplay Dealing Most Ably with Problems of the American Scene)	Cry of the City
1951	Nominated	Writers Guild of America Award	The Robert Meltzer Award (Screenplay Dealing Most Ably with Problems of the American Scene)	Panic in the Streets
1951	Nominated	Writers Guild of America Award	Best Written American Drama	Panic in the Streets
1952	Nominated	Writers Guild of America Award	Best Written American Comedy	You're in the Navy Now
1960	Nominated	Writers Guild of America Award	Best Written American Drama	Compulsion
1970	Won	Writers Guild of America Award	Valentine Davies Award	-
1948	Nominated	Academy Award	Best Writing, Screenplay	Boomerang!
1954	Nominated	Academy Award	Best Writing, Story and Screenplay	The Desert Rats
