= Harry Worth (actor, born 1903) =

British actor (1903–1975)

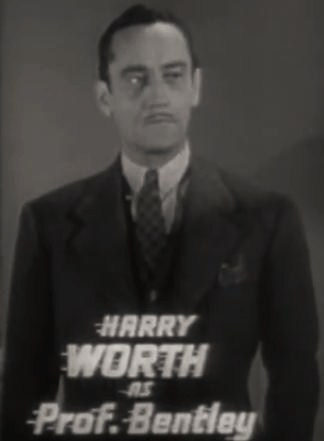
- Worth in Adventures of Captain Marvel (1941)
- Born: 6 February 1903; Yorkshire, England
- Died: 3 November 1975 (aged 72); Albuquerque, New Mexico, U.S.
- Other names: Michael Worth
- Occupation: Actor

Harry J. Worth (6 February 1903 – 3 November 1975), was a British-born actor, who appeared in British productions from 1916 to 1929 and later appeared in a number of feature films after moving to Hollywood in 1935 to 1963. He was generally credited as Harry Worth and Michael Worth.

== Early life ==
Harry J. Worth was born on 6 February 1903 in Yorkshire, England.

== Career ==
All of his films from 1919 to 1929 are British productions. He went to the US in 1929, where his British film experience gave him the background to find his way to the Broadway stage, where he appeared in various productions until coming to Hollywood in 1935.

His first film role was in Universal's Tailspin Tommy in The Great Air Mystery (1935) serial. Worth returned to serials twice more at Republic – as crooked banker Calvin Drake in The Adventures of Red Ryder (1940) and as the archaeologist who turns out to be the masked "Scorpion" in Adventures of Captain Marvel (1941).

== Later years ==
Worth left films after playing a gambler in The Adventures of Mark Twain (1944) and may have returned to the stage, although Social Security records have him in California until 1951. In 1965 he retired to Albuquerque, New Mexico, where he lived with an older sister, Beatrice Gregg, a former actress.

He died on 3 November 1975 at an Albuquerque hospital. Private cremation services took place at Fairview Park Crematory in Albuquerque.
