= William P. Thompson =

American Civil War recipient of the Medal of Honor

- Born: January 11, 1844
- Died: October 7, 1864 (aged 20)
- Military career
- Allegiance: United States
- Branch: US Army
- Service years: 1861–1864
- Rank: Sergeant
- Unit: 20th Indiana Infantry Regiment
- Conflicts: Battle of the Wilderness
- Awards: Medal of Honor

William P. Thompson (January 11, 1844 – October 7, 1864) was a sergeant in the American Civil War and a recipient of the Medal of Honor for action at Battle of the Wilderness during which he was killed on May 6, 1864, with an award being issued to him on December 1, 1864.
