= Tony Martinelli =

American film editor

- Born: November 26, 1909; West Hoboken, New Jersey, United States
- Died: August 15, 1996 (aged 86); Burbank, California, United States
- Occupation: Editor
- Years active: 1935–1976

Tony Martinelli (November 26, 1909 – August 15, 1996) was an American film editor who worked prolifically in American film and television for several decades. He was employed for many years by Republic Pictures. He was also with Universal Pictures.

== Selected filmography ==
- Kentucky Blue Streak (1935)
- Rip Roaring Riley (1935)
- Skybound (1935)
- Yellow Cargo (1936)
- We're in the Legion Now! (1936)
- Captain Calamity (1936)
- Hit the Saddle (1937)
- Navy Spy (1937)
- Riders of the Whistling Skull (1937)
- Heroes of the Hills (1938)
- The Kansas Terrors (1939)
- Cowboys from Texas (1939)
- Days of Jesse James (1939)
- Under Texas Skies (1940)
- Lone Star Raiders (1940)
- Jesse James at Bay (1941)
- Two Gun Sheriff (1941)
- Silver Spurs (1943)
- The Man from Music Mountain (1943)
- Hands Across the Border (1944)
- Faces in the Fog (1944)
- Song of Nevada (1944)
- The Yellow Rose of Texas (1944)
- Along the Navajo Trail (1945)
- Three's a Crowd (1945)
- The Man from Oklahoma (1945)
- Night Train to Memphis (1946)
- The Inner Circle (1946)
- G.I. War Brides (1946)
- Affairs of Geraldine (1946)
- Blackmail (1947)
- Hit Parade of 1947 (1947)
- Night Time in Nevada (1948)
- Eyes of Texas (1948)
- Susanna Pass (1949)
- The Golden Stallion (1949)
- Down Dakota Way (1949)
- North of the Great Divide (1950)
- Cuban Fireball (1951)
- The Sea Hornet (1951)
- Heart of the Rockies (1951)
- Havana Rose (1951)
- The Fabulous Senorita (1952)
- Colorado Sundown (1952)
- The WAC from Walla Walla (1952)
- Black Hills Ambush (1952)
- Bal Tabarin (1952)
- Desperadoes' Outpost (1952)
- Geraldine (1953)
- Marshal of Cedar Rock (1953)
- Bandits of the West (1953)
- San Antone (1953)
- The Outcast (1954)
- The Shanghai Story (1954)
- Santa Fe Passage (1955)
- I Cover the Underworld (1955)
- City of Shadows (1955)
- The Twinkle in God's Eye (1955)
- The Last Command (1955)
- Hell's Crossroads (1957)
- Johnny Trouble (1957)
- Taming Sutton's Gal (1957)
- The Wayward Girl (1957)
- Twilight for the Gods (1958)
- The Saga of Hemp Brown (1958)
- This Rebel Breed (1960)
- Taggart (1964)
- The Counterfeit Killer (1968)
- The Shakiest Gun in the West (1968)

== Bibliography ==
- McBride, Joseph. Steven Spielberg: A Biography, Second Edition. Univ. Press of Mississippi, 2011.
- Pitts, Michael R. Poverty Row Studios, 1929–1940: An Illustrated History of 55 Independent Film Companies, with a Filmography for Each. McFarland & Company, 2005.
