= William Colt MacDonald =

American screenwriter

Allan William Colt MacDonald (December 2, 1891 – March 27, 1968), who used the pen name William Colt MacDonald, was an American writer of western fiction born in Detroit, Michigan whose work appeared both in books and on film.

== Biography ==
His many novels included Gun Country (1929), Rustler's Paradise (1932), The Crimson Quirt (1949), Action at Arcanum (1958), and California Gunman (1957).

His film credits, all for character writing, are about his most famous ones, The Three Mesquiteers−Stony Brooke, Tucson Smith and Lullaby Joslin. They first appeared together in the 1933 novel Law of the Forty-Fives.

The novel was adapted into a movie in 1935, The Law of the 45's, by the independent producers Arthur Alexander and Max Alexander. It featured only two of the characters: Stony Brooke played by Al St. John and called Stoney Martin, and Tucson Smith played by Guinn 'Big Boy' Williams. In Powdersmoke Range, another novel adaptation shot in the same year for RKO, the three appeared together. Stony Brooke is played by Hoot Gibson, Tucson Smith by Harry Carey, and Lullaby Joslin by 'Big Boy' Williams.

Between 1936 and 1943, Republic Pictures released a Three Mesquiteers film series, starting with The Three Mesquiteers, with Robert Livingston as Stony Brooke, Ray Corrigan as Tucson Smith, and Syd Saylor as Lullaby Joslin. Among the 51 movies of the series, 8 have John Wayne as Stony Brooke : Pals of the Saddle, Overland Stage Raiders, Santa Fe Stampede and Red River Range in 1938, and The Night Riders, Three Texas Steers, Wyoming Outlaw and New Frontier in 1939.

== Novels ==
- Gun Country (1929)
- Restless Guns (1929)
- Rustler's Paradise (1932)
- Law of the .45's (1933) a.k.a. Law of the .45s and Sunrise Guns
- Powdersmoke Range (1934)
- Riders of the Whistling Skull (1934)
- King of Crazy River (1934)
- Ghost-Town Gold (1935)
- The Town That God Forgot (1935)
- The Red Rider of Smoky Range (1935)
- Roaring Lead (1935)
- California Gunman (1936)
- Bullets for Buckaroos (1936)
- Sleepy Horse Range (1938) a.k.a. Fighting Kid from Eldorado
- Six-Gun Melody (1939)
- Six-Shooter Showdown (1939)
- The Phantom Pass (1940)
- The Riddle of Ramrod Ridge (1942)
- Boomtown Buccaneers (1942)
- The Vanishing Gun-Slinger (1943)
- The Shadow Rider (1943)
- Cartridge Carnival (1945)
- The Crimson Quirt (1949)
- Gunsight Range (1949)
- Thunderbird Trail (1949)
- The Deputy of Carabina (1949) a.k.a. Two-Gun Deputy
- Stir Up the Dust (1950)
- Ambush at Scorpion Valley (1950) a.k.a. The Singing Scorpion
- Dead Man's Gold (1951)
- Sombrero (1952)
- Three-notch Cameron (1952)
- Cow Thief (1953)
- Peaceful Jenkins (1953)
- Showdown Trail (1953)
- The Killer Brand (1953)
- Blind Cartridges (1953)
- Ranger Man (1954)
- Law and Order Unlimited (1955)
- Lightning Swift (1955)
- The Range Kid (1955)
- The Black Sombrero (1956)
- Flaming Lead (1956)
- Hellgate (1956)
- The Mad Marshal (1958)
- Ridin' Through (1958)
- Blackguard (1959)
- Gun Branders (1962)
- Trouble Shooter (1962)
- Guns Between Suns (1963)
- Battle at Three Cross (1963)
- Incident at Horcado City (1964) a.k.a. The Osage Bow
- The Gloved Saskia (1965)
- Shoot Him on Sight (1966)
- Fugitive from Fear (1968)
- West of Yesterday (1968)
- Alias Dix Ryder (1969)
- Powder Smoke (1969)
- Marked Deck at Topango Wells (1970)
- Rebel Ranger (1971)
- The Riddle of Ramrod Ridge (1972)
- Master of Mesa (1973)
- Punchers of Phantom Pass (1973)
- Whiplash (1973)
- Wheels in the Dust (1973)
- Bullet Trail (1974)
- Snake Hunt (1994)
- Winchester Welcome (1994)
- The Gun-slingin' Gringo (1995)
- Gun Fog (1997)
- The Red Raider (2004)
