= List of feature film series with more than thirty entries =

Key:

- (A) – Film series is 100% animated
- (a) – Film series is not 100% animated and has live action in a sequel or prequel
- (TV) – made-for-TV
- (V) – direct-to-video
- (*) – TV series attached

== 31 ==
- Carry On — Television series
  1. Carry On Sergeant (1958)
  2. Carry On Nurse (1959)
  3. Carry On Teacher (1959)
  4. Carry On Constable (1960)
  5. Carry On Regardless (1961)
  6. Carry On Cruising (1962)
  7. Carry On Cabby (1963)
  8. Carry On Jack (1963)
  9. Carry On Spying (1964)
  10. Carry On Cleo (1964)
  11. Carry On Cowboy (1965)
  12. Carry On Screaming (1966)
  13. Don't Lose Your Head (1966)
  14. Follow That Camel (1967)
  15. Carry On Doctor (1967)
  16. Carry On Up the Khyber (1968)
  17. Carry On Camping (1969)
  18. Carry On Again Doctor (1969)
  19. Carry On Up the Jungle (1970)
  20. Carry On Loving (1970)
  21. Carry On Henry (1971)
  22. Carry On at Your Convenience (1971)
  23. Carry On Matron (1971)
  24. Carry On Abroad (1972)
  25. Carry On Girls (1973)
  26. Carry On Dick (1974)
  27. Carry On Behind (1975)
  28. Carry On England (1976)
  29. That's Carry On! (1978)
  30. Carry On Emmannuelle (1978)
  31. Carry On Columbus (1992)

== 33 ==
- Crayon Shin-chan
  1. Action Mask vs. Leotard Devil (1993)
  2. The Hidden Treasure of the Buri Buri Kingdom (1994)
  3. Unkokusai's Ambition (1995)
  4. Great Adventure in Henderland (1996)
  5. Pursuit of the Balls of Darkness (1997)
  6. Blitzkrieg! Pig's Hoof's Secret Mission (1998)
  7. Explosion! The Hot Spring's Feel Good Final Battle (1999)
  8. Jungle That Invites Storm (2000)
  9. Fierceness That Invites Storm! The Adult Empire Strikes Back (2001)
  10. Fierceness That Invites Storm! The Battle of the Warring States (2002)
  11. Fierceness That Invites Storm! Yakiniku Road of Honor (2003)
  12. Fierceness That Invites Storm! The Kasukabe Boys of the Evening Sun (2004)
  13. The Legend Called Buri Buri 3 Minutes Charge (2005)
  14. The Legend Called: Dance! Amigo! (2006)
  15. Fierceness That Invites Storm! The Singing Buttocks Bomb (2007)
  16. Fierceness That Invites Storm! The Hero of Kinpoko (2008)
  17. Roar! Kasukabe Animal Kingdom (2009)
  18. Super-Dimension! The Storm Called My Bride (2010)
  19. Fierceness That Invites Storm! Operation Golden Spy (2011)
  20. Fierceness That Invites Storm! Me and the Space Princess (2012)
  21. Very Tasty! B-class Gourmet Survival!! (2013)
  22. Intense Battle! Robo Dad Strikes Back (2014)
  23. My Moving Story! Cactus Large Attack! (2015)
  24. Fast Asleep! The Great Assault on Dreamy World! (2016)
  25. Invasion!! Alien Shiriri (2017)
  26. Burst Serving! Kung Fu Boys ~Ramen Rebellion~ (2018)
  27. Honeymoon Hurricane ~The Lost Hiroshi~ (2019)
  28. Crash! Graffiti Kingdom and Almost Four Heroes (2020)
  29. Shrouded in Mystery! The Flowers of Tenkazu Academy (2021)
  30. Mononoke Ninja Chinpūden (2022)
  31. New Dimension! Crayon Shin-chan the Movie: Battle of Supernatural Powers ~Flying Sushi~ (2023)
  32. Our Dinosaury Diary (2024)
  33. Super Magnificent! Scorching Kasukabe Dancers (2025)
- Ultra Series — Television series
  1. Ultraman: Monster Movie Feature (1967)
  2. Ultraman, Ultraseven: Great Violent Monster Fight (1969)
  3. The 6 Ultra Brothers vs. the Monster Army (1974)
  4. Ultraman (1979)
  5. Ultraman: Great Monster Decisive Battle (1979)
  6. Ultraman Zoffy: Ultra Warriors vs. the Giant Monster Army (1984)
  7. Ultraman Story (1984)
  8. Ultraman: The Adventure Begins (1987)
  9. Ultra Q The Movie: Legend of the Stars (1990)
  10. Ultraman Zearth (1996)
  11. Ultraman Tiga & Ultraman Dyna: Warriors of the Star of Light (1998)
  12. Ultraman Gaia: The Battle in Hyperspace (1999)
  13. Ultraman Tiga: The Final Odyssey (2000)
  14. Ultraman Cosmos: The First Contact (2001)
  15. Ultraman Cosmos 2: The Blue Planet (2002)
  16. Ultraman Cosmos vs. Ultraman Justice: The Final Battle (2003)
  17. Ultraman: The Next (2004)
  18. Ultraman Mebius & Ultraman Brothers (2006)
  19. Superior Ultraman 8 Brothers (2008)
  20. Mega Monster Battle: Ultra Galaxy Legends (2009)
  21. Ultraman Zero: The Revenge of Belial (2010)
  22. Ultraman Saga (2012)
  23. Ultraman Ginga Theater Special (2013)
  24. Ultraman Ginga Theater Special: Ultra Monster Hero Battle Royal! (2014)
  25. Ultraman Ginga S The Movie (2015)
  26. Ultraman X The Movie (2016)
  27. Ultraman Orb The Movie (2017)
  28. Ultraman Geed The Movie (2018)
  29. Ultraman R/B the Movie (2019)
  30. Ultraman Taiga The Movie (2020)
  31. Shin Ultraman (2022)
  32. Ultraman Decker Finale: Journey to Beyond (2023)
  33. Ultraman: Rising (2024)

== 35 ==
- Soreike! Anpanman — Television series
  1. The Shining Star's Tear (1989)
  2. Baikinman's Counterattack (1990)
  3. Fly! Fly! Chibigon (1991)
  4. The Secret of Building Block Castle (1992)
  5. Nosshi the Dinosaur's Big Adventure (1993)
  6. The Lyrical Magical Witch's School (1994)
  7. Let's Defeat the Haunted Ship!! (1995)
  8. The Flying Picture Book and the Glass Shoes (1996)
  9. The Pyramid of the Rainbow (1997)
  10. The Palm of the Hand to the Sun (1998)
  11. When the Flower of Courage Opens (1999)
  12. The Tears of the Mermaid Princess (2000)
  13. Gomira's Star (2001)
  14. The Secret of Roll and Roura's Floating Castle (2002)
  15. Ruby's Wish (2003)
  16. Nyanii of the Country of Dream Cats (2004)
  17. Happy's Big Adventure (2005)
  18. Dolly of the Star of Life (2006)
  19. Purun of the Bubble Ball (2007)
  20. Rinrin the Fairy's Secret (2008)
  21. Dadandan and the Twin Stars (2009)
  22. Blacknose and the Magical Song (2010)
  23. Rescue! Kokorin and the Star of Miracles (2011)
  24. Revive Banana Island (2012)
  25. Fly! The Handkerchief of Hope (2013)
  26. Apple Boy and the Wishes For Everyone (2014)
  27. Mija and the Magic Lamp (2015)
  28. Nanda and Runda of the Toy Star (2016)
  29. Bulbul's Big Treasure Hunt Adventure (2017)
  30. Shine! Kurun and the Star of Life (2018)
  31. Sparkle! Princess Vanilla of the Land of Ice Cream (2019)
  32. Fluffy Fuwari and the Cloud Country (2021)
  33. Dororin and the Transformation Carnival (2022)
  34. Roborii and the Warming Present (2023)
  35. Baikinman and the Picture Book of Lulun (2024)

== 36 ==
- Perry Mason — Television series
  1. The Case of the Howling Dog (1934)
  2. The Case of the Curious Bride (1935)
  3. The Case of the Lucky Legs (1935)
  4. The Case of the Velvet Claws (1936)
  5. The Case of the Black Cat (1936)
  6. The Case of the Stuttering Bishop (1937)
  7. Perry Mason Returns (1985) (TV)
  8. Perry Mason: The Case of the Notorious Nun (1986) (TV)
  9. Perry Mason: The Case of the Shooting Star (1986) (TV)
  10. Perry Mason: The Case of the Lost Love (1987) (TV)
  11. Perry Mason: The Case of the Sinister Spirit (1987) (TV)
  12. Perry Mason: The Case of the Murdered Madam (1987) (TV)
  13. Perry Mason: The Case of the Scandalous Scoundrel (1987) (TV)
  14. Perry Mason: The Case of the Avenging Ace (1988) (TV)
  15. Perry Mason: The Case of the Lady in the Lake (1988) (TV)
  16. Perry Mason: The Case of the Lethal Lesson (1989) (TV)
  17. Perry Mason: The Case of the Musical Murder (1989) (TV)
  18. Perry Mason: The Case of the All-Star Assassin (1989) (TV)
  19. Perry Mason: The Case of the Poisoned Pen (1990) (TV)
  20. Perry Mason: The Case of the Desperate Deception (1990) (TV)
  21. Perry Mason: The Case of the Silenced Singer (1990) (TV)
  22. Perry Mason: The Case of the Defiant Daughter (1990) (TV)
  23. Perry Mason: The Case of the Ruthless Reporter (1991) (TV)
  24. Perry Mason: The Case of the Maligned Mobster (1991) (TV)
  25. Perry Mason: The Case of the Glass Coffin (1991) (TV)
  26. Perry Mason: The Case of the Fatal Fashion (1991) (TV)
  27. Perry Mason: The Case of the Fatal Framing (1992) (TV)
  28. Perry Mason: The Case of the Reckless Romeo (1992) (TV)
  29. Perry Mason: The Case of the Heartbroken Bride (1992) (TV)
  30. Perry Mason: The Case of the Skin-Deep Scandal (1993) (TV)
  31. Perry Mason: The Case of the Telltale Talk Show Host (1993) (TV)
  32. Perry Mason: The Case of the Killer Kiss (1993) (TV)
  33. A Perry Mason Mystery: The Case of the Wicked Wives (1993) (TV)
  34. A Perry Mason Mystery: The Case of the Lethal Lifestyle (1994) (TV)
  35. A Perry Mason Mystery: The Case of the Grimacing Governor (1994) (TV)
  36. A Perry Mason Mystery: The Case of the Jealous Jokester (1995) (TV)

== 38 ==
- Martin Beck (series starring Peter Haber)
  1. Beck (1997)
  2. Beck – Mannen med ikonerna (1997) (TV)
  3. Beck – Vita nätter (1997) (TV)
  4. Beck – Öga för öga (1997) (TV)
  5. Beck – Pensionat Pärlan (1998) (TV)
  6. Beck – Monstret (1998) (TV)
  7. Beck – The Money Man (1998) (TV)
  8. Beck – Spår i mörker (1997)
  9. Beck – Hämndens pris (2001)
  10. Beck – Mannen utan ansikte (2001) (TV)
  11. Beck – Kartellen (2002) (TV)
  12. Beck – Enslingen (2002) (TV)
  13. Beck – Okänd avsändare (2002) (TV)
  14. Beck – Annonsmannen (2002) (TV)
  15. Beck – Pojken i glaskulan (2002) (TV)
  16. Beck – Sista vittnet (2002)
  17. Beck – Skarpt läge (2006)
  18. Beck – Flickan i jordkällaren (2006) (V)
  19. Beck – Gamen (2007) (V)
  20. Beck – Advokaten (2007) (V)
  21. Beck – Den japanska shungamålningen (2007) (V)
  22. Beck – Den svaga länken (2007)
  23. Beck – Det tysta skriket (2007) (V)
  24. Beck – I Guds namn (2007) (V)
  25. Beck: The Eye of the Storm (2009)
  26. Beck – Levande begravd (2009)
  27. Beck – Rum 302 (2015) (VoD)
  28. Beck – Familjen (2015) (VoD)
  29. Beck – Invasionen (2015) (VoD)
  30. Beck – Sjukhusmorden (2015) (VoD)
  31. Beck – Gunvald (2016) (VoD)
  32. Beck – Steinar (2016) (VoD)
  33. Beck – Vägs ände (2016) (VoD)
  34. Beck – Sista dagen (2016) (VoD)
  35. Beck – Ditt eget blod (2018) (VoD)
  36. Beck – Den tunna isen (2018) (VoD)
  37. Beck – Utan uppsåt (2018) (VoD)
  38. Beck – Djävulens advokat (2018) (VoD)

== 40 ==
- Godzilla (a)
  1. Godzilla (1954)
  2. Godzilla Raids Again (1955)
  3. King Kong vs. Godzilla (1962)
  4. Mothra vs. Godzilla (1964)
  5. Ghidorah, the Three-Headed Monster (1964)
  6. Invasion of Astro-Monster (1965)
  7. Ebirah, Horror of the Deep (1966)
  8. Son of Godzilla (1967)
  9. Destroy All Monsters (1968)
  10. All Monsters Attack (1969)
  11. Godzilla vs. Hedorah (1971)
  12. Godzilla vs. Gigan (1972)
  13. Godzilla vs. Megalon (1973)
  14. Godzilla vs. Mechagodzilla (1974)
  15. Terror of Mechagodzilla (1975)
  16. The Return of Godzilla (1984)
  17. Godzilla vs. Biollante (1989)
  18. Godzilla vs. King Ghidorah (1991)
  19. Godzilla vs. Mothra (1992)
  20. Godzilla vs. Mechagodzilla II (1993)
  21. Godzilla vs. SpaceGodzilla (1994)
  22. Godzilla vs. Destoroyah (1995)
  23. Godzilla (1998)
  24. Godzilla 2000 (1999)
  25. Godzilla vs. Megaguirus (2000)
  26. Godzilla, Mothra and King Ghidorah: Giant Monsters All-Out Attack (2001)
  27. Godzilla Against Mechagodzilla (2002)
  28. Godzilla: Tokyo S.O.S. (2003)
  29. Godzilla: Final Wars (2004)
  30. Godzilla (2014)
  31. Shin Godzilla (2016)
  32. Godzilla: Planet of the Monsters (2017) (A)
  33. Godzilla: City on the Edge of Battle (2018) (A)
  34. Godzilla: The Planet Eater (2018) (A)
  35. Godzilla: King of the Monsters (2019)
  36. Godzilla vs. Kong (2021)
  37. Godzilla Minus One (2023)
  38. Godzilla x Kong: The New Empire (2024)
  39. Godzilla Minus Zero (2026)
  40. Godzilla x Kong: Supernova (2027)
- Marvel Cinematic Universe — List of television series
  (sm) — Crossover with the Spider-Man film series
  1. Iron Man (2008)
  2. The Incredible Hulk (2008)
  3. Iron Man 2 (2010)
  4. Thor (2011)
  5. Captain America: The First Avenger (2011)
  6. The Avengers (2012)
  7. Iron Man 3 (2013)
  8. Thor: The Dark World (2013)
  9. Captain America: The Winter Soldier (2014)
  10. Guardians of the Galaxy (2014)
  11. Avengers: Age of Ultron (2015)
  12. Ant-Man (2015)
  13. Captain America: Civil War (2016)
  14. Doctor Strange (2016)
  15. Guardians of the Galaxy Vol. 2 (2017)
  16. Spider-Man: Homecoming (2017) (sm)
  17. Thor: Ragnarok (2017)
  18. Black Panther (2018)
  19. Avengers: Infinity War (2018)
  20. Ant-Man and the Wasp (2018)
  21. Captain Marvel (2019)
  22. Avengers: Endgame (2019)
  23. Spider-Man: Far From Home (2019) (sm)
  24. Black Widow (2021)
  25. Shang-Chi and the Legend of the Ten Rings (2021)
  26. Eternals (2021)
  27. Spider-Man: No Way Home (2021) (sm)
  28. Doctor Strange in the Multiverse of Madness (2022)
  29. Thor: Love and Thunder (2022)
  30. Black Panther: Wakanda Forever (2022)
  31. Ant-Man and the Wasp: Quantumania (2023)
  32. Guardians of the Galaxy Vol. 3 (2023)
  33. The Marvels (2023)
  34. Deadpool & Wolverine (2024)
  35. Captain America: Brave New World (2025)
  36. Thunderbolts* (2025)
  37. The Fantastic Four: First Steps (2025)
  38. Spider-Man: Brand New Day (2026) (sm)
  39. Avengers: Doomsday (2026)
  40. Avengers: Secret Wars (2027)

== 42 ==
- Billy the Kid
  1. Billy the Kid Outlawed (1940)
  2. Billy the Kid in Texas (1940)
  3. Billy the Kid's Gun Justice (1940)
  4. Billy the Kid's Range War (1941)
  5. Billy the Kid's Fighting Pals (1941)
  6. Billy the Kid in Santa Fe (1941)
  7. Billy the Kid Wanted (1941)
  8. Billy the Kid's Round-Up (1941)
  9. Billy the Kid Trapped (1942)
  10. Billy the Kid's Smoking Guns (1942)
  11. Law and Order (1942)
  12. Sheriff of Sage Valley (1942)
  13. The Mysterious Rider (1942)
  14. The Kid Rides Again (1943)
  15. Fugitive of the Plains (1943)
  16. Western Cyclone (1943)
  17. Cattle Stampede (1943)
  18. The Renegade (1943)
  19. Blazing Frontier (1943)
  20. Devil Riders (1943)
  21. Frontier Outlaws (1944)
  22. Valley of Vengeance (1944)
  23. The Drifter (1944)
  24. Rustlers' Hideout (1944)
  25. Wild Horse Phantom (1944)
  26. Oath of Vengeance (1944)
  27. His Brother's Ghost (1945)
  28. Thundering Gun Slingers (1945)
  29. Shadows of Death (1945)
  30. Gangster's Den (1945)
  31. Fuzzy Settles Down (1945)
  32. Stagecoach Outlaws (1945)
  33. Border Badmen (1945)
  34. Fighting Bill Carson (1945)
  35. Prairie Rustlers (1945)
  36. Lightning Raiders (1945)
  37. Terrors on Horseback (1946)
  38. Gentlemen with Guns (1946)
  39. Ghost of Hidden Valley (1946)
  40. Prairie Badmen (1946)
  41. Overland Riders (1946)
  42. Outlaws of the Plains (1946)

== 44 ==
- Superman (a) ************
1. Superman (1941) (A)
2. The Mechanical Monsters (1941) (A)
3. Billion Dollar Limited (1942) (A)
4. The Arctic Giant (1942) (A)
5. The Bulleteers (1942) (A)
6. The Magnetic Telescope (1942) (A)
7. Electric Earthquake (1942) (A)
8. Volcano (1942) (A)
9. Terror on the Midway (1942) (A)
10. Japoteurs (1942) (A)
11. Showdown (1942) (A)
12. Eleventh Hour (1942) (A)
13. Destruction, Inc. (1942) (A)
14. The Mummy Strikes (1943) (A)
15. Jungle Drums (1943) (A)
16. The Underground World (1943) (A)
17. Secret Agent (1943) (A)
18. Superman (1948) (film serial)
19. Atom Man vs. Superman (1950) (film serial)
20. Superman and the Mole Men (1951) (standalone film)
21. Superman (1978)
22. Superman II (1980)
23. Superman III (1983)
24. Supergirl (1984) (spin-off)
25. Superman IV: The Quest for Peace (1987)
26. Superman: Brainiac Attacks (2006) (A)
27. Superman Returns (2006) (retcon)
28. Superman: Doomsday (2007) (A)
29. Superman/Batman: Public Enemies (2009) (A)
30. Superman/Batman: Apocalypse (2010) (A)
31. Superman/Shazam!: The Return of Black Adam (2010) (A)
32. All-Star Superman (2011) (A)
33. Superman vs. The Elite (2012) (A)
34. Superman: Unbound (2013) (A)
35. Man of Steel (2013) (reboot)
36. Batman v Superman: Dawn of Justice (2016) (crossover)
37. The Death of Superman (2018) (A)
38. Reign of the Supermen (2019) (A)
39. Superman: Red Son (2020) (A)
40. Superman: Man of Tomorrow (2020) (A)
41. Batman and Superman: Battle of the Super Sons (2022) (A)
42. Superman (2025) (reboot)
43. Supergirl (2026) (spin-off)
44. Man of Tomorrow (2027) (reboot)
- Barbie — 2018–2020 and 2022 television series. All films are DTV.
  1. Barbie in the Nutcracker (2001)
  2. Barbie as Rapunzel (2002)
  3. Barbie of Swan Lake (2003)
  4. Barbie as the Princess and the Pauper (2004)
  5. Barbie: Fairytopia (2005)
  6. Barbie and the Magic of Pegasus (2005)
  7. Barbie: Mermaidia (2006)
  8. The Barbie Diaries (2006)
  9. Barbie in the 12 Dancing Princesses (2006)
  10. Barbie Fairytopia: Magic of the Rainbow (2007)
  11. Barbie as the Island Princess (2007)
  12. Barbie: Mariposa (2008)
  13. Barbie & the Diamond Castle (2008)
  14. Barbie in A Christmas Carol (2008)
  15. Barbie Presents: Thumbelina (2009)
  16. Barbie and the Three Musketeers (2009)
  17. Barbie in A Mermaid Tale (2010)
  18. Barbie: A Fashion Fairytale (2010)
  19. Barbie: A Fairy Secret (2011)
  20. Barbie: Princess Charm School (2011)
  21. Barbie: A Perfect Christmas (2011)
  22. Barbie in A Mermaid Tale 2 (2012)
  23. Barbie: The Princess & the Popstar (2012)
  24. Barbie in the Pink Shoes (2013)
  25. Barbie: Mariposa and the Fairy Princess (2013)
  26. Barbie & Her Sisters in A Pony Tale (2013)
  27. Barbie: The Pearl Princess (2014)
  28. Barbie and the Secret Door (2014)
  29. Barbie in Princess Power (2015)
  30. Barbie in Rock 'N Royals (2015)
  31. Barbie & Her Sisters in The Great Puppy Adventure (2015)
  32. Barbie: Spy Squad (2016)
  33. Barbie: Star Light Adventure (2016)
  34. Barbie & Her Sisters: Puppy Rescue (2016)
  35. Barbie: Video Game Hero (2017)
  36. Barbie: Dolphin Magic (2017)
  37. Barbie: Princess Adventure (2020)
  38. Barbie & Chelsea: The Lost Birthday (2021)
  39. Barbie: Big City, Big Dreams (2021)
  40. Barbie: Mermaid Power (2022)
  41. Barbie: Epic Road Trip (2022)
  42. Barbie: Skipper and the Big Babysitting Adventure (2023)
  43. Barbie and Stacie to the Rescue (2024)
  44. Barbie & Teresa: Recipe for Friendship (2025)
- Lupin the Third — Television series
  1. Lupin III: Strange Psychokinetic Strategy (1974) (live-action)
  2. Lupin III: The Mystery of Mamo (1978)
  3. Lupin III: The Castle of Cagliostro (1979)
  4. Lupin III: Legend of the Gold of Babylon (1985)
  5. Lupin III: The Fuma Conspiracy (1987)
  6. Lupin III: Bye Bye, Lady Liberty (1989) (TV)
  7. Lupin III: The Hemingway Papers (1990) (TV)
  8. Lupin III: Steal Napoleon's Dictionary (1991) (TV)
  9. Lupin III: From Siberia with Love (1992) (TV)
  10. Lupin III: Voyage to Danger (1993) (TV)
  11. Lupin III: Dragon of Doom (1994) (TV)
  12. Lupin III: Farewell to Nostradamus (1995)
  13. Lupin III: The Pursuit of Harimao's Treasure (1995) (TV)
  14. Lupin III: Dead or Alive (1996)
  15. Lupin III: The Secret of Twilight Gemini (1996) (TV)
  16. Lupin III: Island of Assassins (1997) (TV)
  17. Lupin III: Crisis in Tokyo (1998) (TV)
  18. Lupin III: The Columbus Files (1999) (TV)
  19. Lupin III: Missed by a Dollar (2000) (TV)
  20. Lupin III: Alcatraz Connection (2001) (TV)
  21. Lupin III: Return of Pycal (2002) (OVA)
  22. Lupin III: Episode 0: The First Contact (2002) (TV)
  23. Lupin III: Operation Return the Treasure (2003) (TV)
  24. Lupin III: Stolen Lupin (2004) (TV)
  25. Lupin III: An Angel's Tactics (2005) (TV)
  26. Lupin III: Seven Days Rhapsody (2006) (TV)
  27. Lupin III: Elusiveness of the Fog (2007) (TV)
  28. Lupin III: Green vs. Red (2008) (OVA)
  29. Lupin III: Sweet Lost Night (2008) (TV)
  30. Lupin the 3rd vs. Detective Conan (2009) (TV)
  31. Lupin III: The Last Job (2010) (TV)
  32. Lupin III: Blood Seal of the Eternal Mermaid (2011) (TV)
  33. Lupin III: Record of Observations of the East - Another Page (2012) (TV)
  34. Lupin III: Princess of the Breeze - Hidden City in the Sky (2013) (TV)
  35. Lupin the 3rd vs. Detective Conan: The Movie (2013)
  36. Lupin the 3rd (2014) (live-action)
  37. Lupin III: Daisuke Jigen's Gravestone (2014)
  38. Lupin III: Italian Game (2016) (TV)
  39. Lupin III: Goemon Ishikawa's Spray of Blood (2017)
  40. Lupin III: Goodbye Partner (2019) (TV)
  41. Lupin III: Fujiko Mine's Lie (2019)
  42. Lupin III: Prison of the Past (2019) (TV)
  43. Lupin III: The First (2019)
  44. Lupin III vs. Cat's Eye (2023) (ONA)

== 47 ==
- Charlie Chan
  1. The House Without a Key (1926)
  2. The Chinese Parrot (1927)
  3. Behind That Curtain (1929)
  4. The Black Camel (1931)
  5. Charlie Chan Carries On (1931)
  6. Charlie Chan's Chance (1932)
  7. Charlie Chan's Greatest Case (1933)
  8. Charlie Chan's Courage (1934)
  9. Charlie Chan in London (1934)
  10. Charlie Chan in Paris (1935)
  11. Charlie Chan in Egypt (1935)
  12. Charlie Chan in Shanghai (1935)
  13. Charlie Chan's Secret (1936)
  14. Charlie Chan at the Circus (1936)
  15. Charlie Chan at the Race Track (1936)
  16. Charlie Chan at the Opera (1936)
  17. Charlie Chan at the Olympics (1937)
  18. Charlie Chan on Broadway (1937)
  19. Charlie Chan at Monte Carlo (1938)
  20. Charlie Chan in Honolulu (1938)
  21. Charlie Chan in Reno (1939)
  22. Charlie Chan at Treasure Island (1939)
  23. City in Darkness (1939)
  24. Charlie Chan's Murder Cruise (1940)
  25. Charlie Chan at the Wax Museum (1940)
  26. Charlie Chan in Panama (1940)
  27. Murder Over New York (1940)
  28. Dead Men Tell (1941)
  29. Charlie Chan in Rio (1941)
  30. Castle in the Desert (1942)
  31. Charlie Chan in the Secret Service (1944)
  32. Charlie Chan in the Chinese Cat (1944)
  33. Black Magic (1944)
  34. The Shanghai Cobra (1945)
  35. The Red Dragon (1945)
  36. The Scarlet Clue (1945)
  37. The Jade Mask (1945)
  38. Shadows Over Chinatown (1946)
  39. Dangerous Money (1946)
  40. Dark Alibi (1946)
  41. The Trap (1946) (aka Murder at Malibu Beach)
  42. The Chinese Ring (1947)
  43. Docks of New Orleans (1948)
  44. Shanghai Chest (1948)
  45. The Golden Eye (1948)
  46. The Feathered Serpent (1948)
  47. Sky Dragon (1949)
- Edgar Wallace Mysteries
  1. Clue of the Twisted Candle (1960)
  2. Marriage of Convenience (1960)
  3. The Man Who Was Nobody (1960)
  4. The Malpas Mystery (1960)
  5. The Clue of the New Pin (1960)
  6. The Fourth Square (1961)
  7. Partners in Crime (1961)
  8. Clue of the Silver Key (1961)
  9. Attempt to Kill (1961)
  10. Man at the Carlton Tower (1961)
  11. Never Back Losers (1961)
  12. The Sinister Man (1961)
  13. Man Detained (1961)
  14. Backfire! (1962)
  15. Candidate for Murder (1962)
  16. Flat Two (1962)
  17. The Share Out (1962)
  18. Time to Remember (1962)
  19. Number Six (1962)
  20. Solo for Sparrow (1962)
  21. Death Trap (1962)
  22. Playback (1962)
  23. Locker Sixty-Nine (1962)
  24. The Set Up (1962)
  25. On the Run (1963)
  26. Incident at Midnight (1963)
  27. Return to Sender (1963)
  28. Ricochet (1963)
  29. The £20,000 Kiss (1963)
  30. The Double (1963)
  31. The Partner (1963)
  32. To Have and to Hold (1963)
  33. The Rivals (1963)
  34. Five to One (1963)
  35. Accidental Death (1963)
  36. Downfall (1964)
  37. The Verdict (1964)
  38. We Shall See (1964)
  39. Who Was Maddox? (1964)
  40. Act of Murder (1964)
  41. Face of a Stranger (1964)
  42. Never Mention Murder (1964)
  43. The Main Chance (1964)
  44. Game for Three Losers (1965)
  45. Change Partners (1965)
  46. Strangler's Web (1965)
  47. Dead Man's Chest (1965)
- Doraemon — 1973, 1979 and 2005 televisions series (A)
  1. Doraemon: Nobita's Dinosaur (1980)
  2. Doraemon: The Records of Nobita, Spaceblazer (1981)
  3. Doraemon: Nobita and the Haunts of Evil (1982)
  4. Doraemon: Nobita and the Castle of the Undersea Devil (1983)
  5. Doraemon: Nobita's Great Adventure into the Underworld (1984)
  6. Doraemon: Nobita's Little Star Wars (1985)
  7. Doraemon: Nobita and the Steel Troops (1986)
  8. Doraemon: Nobita and the Knights on Dinosaurs (1987)
  9. Doraemon: The Record of Nobita's Parallel Visit to the West (1988)
  10. Doraemon: Nobita and the Birth of Japan (1989)
  11. Doraemon: Nobita and the Animal Planet (1990)
  12. Doraemon: Nobita's Dorabian Nights (1991)
  13. Doraemon: Nobita and the Kingdom of Clouds (1992)
  14. Doraemon: Nobita and the Tin Labyrinth (1993)
  15. Doraemon: Nobita's Three Visionary Swordsmen (1994)
  16. Doraemon: Nobita's Diary on the Creation of the World (1995)
  17. Doraemon: Nobita and the Galaxy Super-express (1996)
  18. Doraemon: Nobita and the Spiral City (1997)
  19. Doraemon: Nobita's Great Adventure in the South Seas (1998)
  20. Doraemon: Nobita Drifts in the Universe (1999)
  21. Doraemon: Nobita and the Legend of the Sun King (2000)
  22. Doraemon: Nobita and the Winged Braves (2001)
  23. Doraemon: Nobita in the Robot Kingdom (2002)
  24. Doraemon: Nobita and the Windmasters (2003)
  25. Doraemon: Nobita in the Wan-Nyan Spacetime Odyssey (2004)
  26. Doraemon: Nobita's Dinosaur 2006 (2006)
  27. Doraemon: Nobita's New Great Adventure into the Underworld (2007)
  28. Doraemon: Nobita and the Green Giant Legend (2008)
  29. Doraemon: The Record of Nobita's Spaceblazer (2009)
  30. Doraemon: Nobita's Great Battle of the Mermaid King (2010)
  31. Doraemon: Nobita and the New Steel Troops—Winged Angels (2011)
  32. Doraemon: Nobita and the Island of Miracles—Animal Adventure (2012)
  33. Doraemon: Nobita's Secret Gadget Museum (2013)
  34. Doraemon: New Nobita's Great Demon—Peko and the Exploration Party of Five (2014)
  35. Stand by Me Doraemon (2014) (CGI)
  36. Doraemon: Nobita's Space Heroes (2015)
  37. Doraemon: Nobita and the Birth of Japan 2016 (2016)
  38. Doraemon the Movie 2017: Great Adventure in the Antarctic Kachi Kochi (2017)
  39. Doraemon: Nobita's Treasure Island (2018)
  40. Doraemon: Nobita's Chronicle of the Moon Exploration (2019)
  41. Doraemon: Nobita's New Dinosaur (2020)
  42. Stand by Me Doraemon 2 (2020) (CGI)
  43. Doraemon: Nobita's Little Star Wars 2021 (2022)
  44. Doraemon: Nobita's Sky Utopia (2023)
  45. Doraemon: Nobita's Earth Symphony (2024)
  46. Doraemon: Nobita's Art World Tales (2025)
  47. Doraemon: New Nobita and the Castle of the Undersea Devil (2026)

== 48 ==
- The Bowery Boys
  1. Live Wires (1946)
  2. In Fast Company (1946)
  3. Bowery Bombshell (1946)
  4. Spook Busters (1946)
  5. Mr. Hex (1946)
  6. Hard Boiled Mahoney (1947)
  7. News Hounds (1947)
  8. Bowery Buckaroos (1947)
  9. Angels' Alley (1948)
  10. Jinx Money (1948)
  11. Smugglers' Cove (1948)
  12. Trouble Makers (1948)
  13. Fighting Fools (1949)
  14. Hold That Baby! (1949)
  15. Angels in Disguise (1949)
  16. Master Minds (1949)
  17. Blonde Dynamite (1950)
  18. Lucky Losers (1950)
  19. Triple Trouble (1950)
  20. Blues Busters (1950)
  21. Bowery Battalion (1951)
  22. Ghost Chasers (1951)
  23. Let's Go Navy! (1951)
  24. Crazy Over Horses (1951)
  25. Hold That Line (1952)
  26. Here Come the Marines (1952)
  27. Feudin' Fools (1952)
  28. No Holds Barred (1952)
  29. Jalopy (1953)
  30. Loose in London (1953)
  31. Clipped Wings (1953)
  32. Private Eyes (1953)
  33. Paris Playboys (1954)
  34. The Bowery Boys Meet the Monsters (1954)
  35. Jungle Gents (1954)
  36. Bowery to Bagdad (1955)
  37. High Society (1955)
  38. Spy Chasers (1955)
  39. Jail Busters (1955)
  40. Dig That Uranium (1956)
  41. Crashing Las Vegas (1956)
  42. Fighting Trouble (1956)
  43. Hot Shots (1956)
  44. Hold That Hypnotist (1957)
  45. Spook Chasers (1957)
  46. Looking for Danger (1957)
  47. Up in Smoke (1957)
  48. In the Money (1958)

== 49 ==
- Scooby-Doo (a)
  1. Scooby Goes Hollywood (1979) (TV)
  2. Scooby-Doo Meets the Boo Brothers (1987) (TV)
  3. Scooby-Doo and the Reluctant Werewolf (1988) (TV)
  4. Scooby-Doo and the Ghoul School (1988) (TV)
  5. Scooby-Doo in Arabian Nights (1994) (TV)
  6. Scooby-Doo on Zombie Island (1998) (V)
  7. Scooby-Doo! and the Witch's Ghost (1999) (V)
  8. Scooby-Doo and the Alien Invaders (2000) (V)
  9. Scooby-Doo and the Cyber Chase (2001) (V)
  10. Scooby-Doo (2002)
  11. Scooby-Doo! and the Legend of the Vampire (2003) (V)
  12. Scooby-Doo! and the Monster of Mexico (2003) (V)
  13. Scooby-Doo 2: Monsters Unleashed (2004)
  14. Scooby-Doo! and the Loch Ness Monster (2004) (V)
  15. Aloha, Scooby-Doo! (2005) (V)
  16. Scooby-Doo! in Where's My Mummy? (2005) (V)
  17. Scooby-Doo! Pirates Ahoy! (2006) (V)
  18. Chill Out, Scooby-Doo! (2007) (V)
  19. Scooby-Doo! and the Goblin King (2008) (V)
  20. Scooby-Doo! and the Samurai Sword (2009) (V)
  21. Scooby-Doo! The Mystery Begins (2009) (TV) (reboot)
  22. Scooby-Doo! Abracadabra-Doo (2010) (V)
  23. Scooby-Doo! Camp Scare (2010) (V)
  24. Scooby-Doo! Curse of the Lake Monster (2010) (TV) (reboot)
  25. Scooby-Doo! Legend of the Phantosaur (2011) (V)
  26. Scooby-Doo! Music of the Vampire (2012) (V)
  27. Big Top Scooby-Doo! (2012) (V)
  28. Scooby-Doo! Mask of the Blue Falcon (2013) (V)
  29. Scooby-Doo! Adventures: The Mystery Map (2013) (V)
  30. Scooby-Doo! Stage Fright (2013) (V)
  31. Scooby-Doo! WrestleMania Mystery (2014) (V)
  32. Scooby-Doo! Frankencreepy (2014) (V)
  33. Scooby-Doo! Moon Monster Madness (2015) (V)
  34. Scooby-Doo! and Kiss: Rock and Roll Mystery (2015) (V)
  35. Lego Scooby-Doo! Haunted Hollywood (2016) (V)
  36. Scooby-Doo! and WWE: Curse of the Speed Demon (2016) (V)
  37. Scooby-Doo! Shaggy's Showdown (2017) (V)
  38. Lego Scooby-Doo! Blowout Beach Bash (2017) (V)
  39. Scooby-Doo! & Batman: The Brave and the Bold (2018) (V)
  40. Daphne & Velma (2018) (V) (spin-off)
  41. Scooby-Doo! and the Gourmet Ghost (2018) (V)
  42. Scooby-Doo! and the Curse of the 13th Ghost (2019) (V)
  43. Scooby-Doo! Return to Zombie Island (2019) (V)
  44. Scoob! (2020)
  45. Happy Halloween, Scooby-Doo! (2020) (V)
  46. Scooby-Doo! The Sword and the Scoob (2021) (V)
  47. Straight Outta Nowhere: Scooby-Doo! Meets Courage the Cowardly Dog (2021) (V)
  48. Trick or Treat Scooby-Doo! (2022) (V)
  49. Scooby-Doo! and Krypto, Too! (2023) (V)

== 50 ==
- Otoko wa Tsurai yo
  1. Otoko wa Tsurai yo (1969)
  2. Zoku Otoko wa Tsurai yo (1969)
  3. Otoko wa Tsurai yo: Fuuten no Tora (1970)
  4. Shin Otoko wa Tsurai yo (1970)
  5. Otoko wa Tsurai yo: Bōkyō hen (1970)
  6. Otoko wa Tsurai yo: Junjō hen (1971)
  7. Otoko wa Tsurai yo: Funtō hen (1971)
  8. Otoko wa Tsurai yo: Torajirō koiuta (1971)
  9. Otoko wa Tsurai yo: Shibamata bojō (1972)
  10. Otoko wa Tsurai yo: Torajirō yumemakura (1972)
  11. Otoko wa Tsurai yo: Torajirō wasurenagusa (1973)
  12. Otoko wa Tsurai yo: Watashi no Tora-san (1973)
  13. Otoko wa Tsurai yo: Torajirō Koiyatsure (1974)
  14. Otoko wa Tsurai yo: Torajirō Komoriuta (1974)
  15. Otoko wa Tsurai yo: Torajirō Aiaigasa (1975)
  16. Otoko wa Tsurai yo: Katsushika Risshihen (1975)
  17. Otoko wa Tsurai yo: Torajirō Yūyake Koyake (1976)
  18. Otoko wa Tsurai yo: Torajirō Junjōshishū (1976)
  19. Otoko wa Tsurai yo: Torajirō to Tonosama (1977)
  20. Otoko wa Tsurai yo: Torajirō Gambare! (1977)
  21. Otoko wa Tsurai yo: Torajirō Wagamichi o Yuku (1978)
  22. Otoko wa Tsurai yo: Uwasa no Torajirō (1978)
  23. Otoko wa Tsurai yo: Tonderu Torajirō (1979)
  24. Otoko wa Tsurai yo: Torajirō Haru no Yume (1979)
  25. Otoko wa Tsurai yo: Torajirō Haibisukasu no Hana (1980)
  26. Otoko wa Tsurai yo: Torajirō Kamome Uta (1980)
  27. Otoko wa Tsurai yo: Naniwa no Koi no Torajirō (1981)
  28. Otoko wa Tsurai yo: Torajirō Kamifūsen (1981)
  29. Otoko wa Tsurai yo: Torajirō Ajisai no Koi (1982)
  30. Otoko wa Tsurai yo: Hana mo Arashi mo Torajirō (1982)
  31. Otoko wa Tsurai yo: Tabi to Onna to Torajirō (1983)
  32. Otoko wa Tsurai yo: Kuchibue o Fuku Torajirō (1983)
  33. Otoko wa Tsurai yo: Yogiri ni Musebu Torajirō (1984)
  34. Otoko wa Tsurai yo: Torajirō Shinjitsu Ichiro (1984)
  35. Otoko wa Tsurai yo: Torajirō Ren'aijuku (1985)
  36. Otoko wa Tsurai yo: Shibamata yori Ai o Komete (1985)
  37. Otoko wa Tsurai yo: Shiawase no Aoi Tori (1986)
  38. Otoko wa Tsurai yo: Shiretoko Bojō (1987)
  39. Otoko wa Tsurai yo: Torajirō Monogatari (1987)
  40. Otoko wa Tsurai yo: Torajirō Sarada Kinenbi (1988)
  41. Otoko wa Tsurai yo: Torajirō Kokoro no Tabiji (1989)
  42. Otoko wa Tsurai yo: Boku no Ojisan (1989)
  43. Otoko wa Tsurai yo: Torajirō no Kyūjitsu (1990)
  44. Otoko wa Tsurai yo: Torajirō no Kokuhaku (1991)
  45. Otoko wa Tsurai yo: Torajirō no Seishun (1992)
  46. Otoko wa Tsurai yo: Torajirō no Endan (1993)
  47. Otoko wa Tsurai yo: Haikei, Kuruma Torajirō-sama (1994)
  48. Otoko wa Tsurai yo: Torajirō Kurenai no Hana (1995)
  49. Otoko wa Tsurai yo: Torajirō Haibisukasu no Hana Tokubetsuhen (1997)
  50. Otoko wa Tsurai yo 50: Okaeri, Torasan (2019)

== 51 ==
- The Three Mesquiteers
  1. The Three Mesquiteers (1936)
  2. Ghost-Town Gold (1936)
  3. Roarin' Lead (1936)
  4. Riders of the Whistling Skull (1937)
  5. Hit the Saddle (1937)
  6. Gunsmoke Ranch (1937)
  7. Come on, Cowboys (1937)
  8. Range Defenders (1937)
  9. Heart of the Rockies (1937)
  10. The Trigger Trio (1937)
  11. Wild Horse Rodeo (1937)
  12. The Purple Vigilantes (1938)
  13. Call the Mesquiteers (1938)
  14. Outlaws of Sonora (1938)
  15. Riders of the Black Hills (1938)
  16. Heroes of the Hills (1938)
  17. Pals of the Saddle (1938)
  18. Overland Stage Raiders (1938)
  19. Santa Fe Stampede (1938)
  20. Red River Range (1938)
  21. The Night Riders (1939)
  22. Three Texas Steers (1939)
  23. Wyoming Outlaw (1939)
  24. New Frontier (1939)
  25. The Kansas Terrors (1939)
  26. Cowboys from Texas (1939)
  27. Heroes of the Saddle (1940)
  28. Pioneers of the West (1940)
  29. Covered Wagon Days (1940)
  30. Rocky Mountain Rangers (1940)
  31. Oklahoma Renegades (1940)
  32. Under Texas Skies (1940)
  33. The Trail Blazers (1940)
  34. Lone Star Raiders (1940)
  35. Prairie Pioneers (1941)
  36. Pals of the Pecos (1941)
  37. Saddlemates (1941)
  38. Gangs of Sonora (1941)
  39. Outlaws of Cherokee Trail (1941)
  40. Gauchos of El Dorado (1941)
  41. West of Cimarron (1941)
  42. Code of the Outlaw (1942)
  43. Raiders of the Range (1942)
  44. Westward Ho (1942)
  45. The Phantom Plainsmen (1942)
  46. Shadows on the Sage (1942)
  47. Valley of Hunted Men (1942)
  48. Thundering Trails (1943)
  49. The Blocked Trail (1943)
  50. Santa Fe Scouts (1943)
  51. Riders of the Rio Grande (1943)

== 52 ==
- Santo
  1. Santo contra el cerebro del mal (Santo Vs. The Evil Brain) (1958)
  2. Santo contra hombres infernales (Santo vs. The Infernal Men) (1958)
  3. Santo contra los zombies (Santo vs. The Zombies) (1961) (aka Invasion of the Zombies)
  4. Santo contra el rey del crimen (Santo vs. The King of Crime) (1961)
  5. Santo en el hotel de la muerte (Santo In The Hotel of Death) (1961)
  6. Santo contra el cerebro diabolico (Santo vs. the Diabolical Brain) (1962)
  7. Santo contra las mujeres vampiro (Santo vs. The Vampire Women) (1962) (aka Samson vs. the Vampire Women)
  8. Santo en el museo de cera (Santo In The Wax Museum) (1963) (aka Samson in the Wax Museum)
  9. Santo contra el estrangulador (Santo vs. The Strangler (1963)
  10. El espectro del estrangulador (Santo vs. The Ghost of the Strangler) (1963)
  11. Blue Demon contra el poder satánico (Blue Demon vs. Satanic Power) (1964)
  12. Santo en Atacan las brujas (Santo in The Witches Attack) (1964)
  13. El hacha diabólica (Santo in The Diabolical Axe) (1964)
  14. Santo en los profanadores de tumbas (Santo in The Grave Robbers) (1965)
  15. Santo en el Barón Brakola (Santo in Baron Brakola) (1965)
  16. Santo contra la invasión de los marcianos (Santo vs. The Martian Invasion) (1966)
  17. Santo contra los villanos del ring (Santo vs. The Villains of the Ring) (1966)
  18. Santo en Operación 67 (Santo in Operation 67) 1966)
  19. Santo en el tesoro de Moctezuma (Santo in The Treasure of Moctezuma) (1967)
  20. Santo en el tesoro de Drácula (Santo in Dracula's Treasure) (1968) (aka The Vampire and Sex)
  21. Santo contra Capulina (Santo vs. Capulina) (1968)
  22. Santo contra Blue Demon en la Atlántida (Santo vs. Blue Demon in Atlantis) (1969)
  23. Santo y Blue Demon contra los monstruos (Santo and Blue Demon vs. the Monsters) (1969)
  24. Santo y Blue Demon en el mundo de los muertos (Santo and Blue Demon in the World of the Dead) (1969)
  25. Santo contra los cazadores de cabezas (Santo vs. The Headhunters) (1969)
  26. Santo frente a la muerte (Santo Faces Death) (1969) (aka Santo vs. the Mafia Killers)
  27. Santo contra los jinetes del terror (Santo Vs The Terror Riders) (1970) (aka The Lepers and Sex)
  28. Santo en la venganza de las mujeres vampiro (Santo in the Revenge of the Vampire Women) (1970)
  29. Santo contra la mafia del vicio (Santo vs. The Mafia of Vice (1970) (aka Mission Sabotage)
  30. Santo en la venganza de la momia (Santo in the Mummy's Revenge (1970)
  31. Santo en Las momias de Guanajuato (Santo in The Mummies of Guanajuato) (1970)
  32. Santo en el misterio de la perla negra (Santo in the Mystery of the Black Pearl) (1971) (aka The Caribbean Connection)
  33. Santo contra la hija de Frankenstein (Santo vs. Frankenstein's Daughter) (1971)
  34. Santo en Misión suicida (Santo in Suicide Mission) (1971)
  35. Santo contra los asesinos de otros mundos (Santo vs. the Killers from Other Worlds) (1971)
  36. Santo y el tigresa en el aguila real (Santo and the Tigress in the Royal Eagle) (1971)
  37. Santo y Blue Demon contra Drácula y el Hombre Lobo (Santo and Blue Demon Vs. Dracula and the Wolf Man) (1972)
  38. Santo contra los secuestradores (Santo Vs. The Kidnappers) (1972)
  39. Santo contra la magia negra (Santo vs. Black Magic) (1972)
  40. Santo y Blue Demon en las bestias del terror (Santo and Blue Demon in the Beasts of Terror) (1972)
  41. Santo contra las lobas (Santo vs. The She-Wolves) (1972)
  42. Santo en Anónimo mortal (Santo in Anonymous Death Threat) (1972)
  43. Santo y Blue Demon contra el doctor Frankenstein (Santo and Blue Demon Vs Dr. Frankenstein) (1973)
  44. Santo contra el doctor Muerte (Santo Vs Dr. Death) (1973) (aka Santo Strikes Again, The Masked Man Strikes Again)
  45. Santo en la venganza de la llorona (Santo in the Revenge of the Crying Woman) (1974)
  46. Santo en Oro negro (Santo in Black Gold) (1975) (aka La Noche de San Juan)
  47. Santo en el Misterio en las Bermudas (Santo in The Bermuda Mystery) (1977)
  48. Santo en la frontera del terror (Santo at the Border of Terror) (1979) (aka Santo vs. the White Shadow)
  49. Santo contra el asesino de televisión (Santo vs. the TV Killer) (1981)
  50. Chanoc y el hijo del Santo contra los vampiros asesinos (Chanoc and Son of Santo vs. The Killer Vampires) (1981)
  51. Santo en el puño de la muerte (Santo in Fist of Death) (1982)
  52. Santo en la furia de los karatekas (Santo in Fury of the Karate Experts) (1982)

== 64 ==
- The Durango Kid
  1. The Durango Kid (1940)
  2. The Return of the Durango Kid (1945)
  3. Both Barrels Blazing (1945)
  4. Rustlers of the Badlands (1945)
  5. Outlaws of the Rockies (1945)
  6. Blazing the Western Trail (1945)
  7. Lawless Empire (1945)
  8. Texas Panhandle (1945)
  9. Frontier Gunlaw (1946)
  10. Roaring Rangers (1946)
  11. Gunning for Vengeance (1946)
  12. Galloping Thunder (1946)
  13. Two-Fisted Stranger (1946)
  14. The Desert Horseman (1946)
  15. Heading West (1946)
  16. Landrush (1946)
  17. Terror Trail (1946)
  18. The Fighting Frontiersman (1946)
  19. South of the Chisholm Trail (1947)
  20. The Lone Hand Texan (1947)
  21. West of Dodge City (1947)
  22. Law of the Canyon (1947)
  23. Prairie Raiders (1947)
  24. The Stranger from Ponca City (1947)
  25. Riders of the Lone Star (1947)
  26. Buckaroo from Powder River (1947)
  27. Last Days of Boot Hill (1947)
  28. Six-Gun Law (1948)
  29. Phantom Valley (1948)
  30. West of Sonora (1948)
  31. Whirlwind Raiders (1948)
  32. Blazing Across the Pecos (1948)
  33. Trail to Laredo (1948)
  34. El Dorado Pass (1948)
  35. Quick on the Trigger (1948)
  36. Challenge of the Range (1949)
  37. Desert Vigilante (1949)
  38. Laramie (1949)
  39. The Blazing Trail (1949)
  40. Bandits of El Dorado (1949)
  41. Horsemen of the Sierras (1949)
  42. Renegades of the Sage (1949)
  43. Trail of the Rustlers (1950)
  44. Outcast of Black Mesa (1950)
  45. Texas Dynamo (1950)
  46. Streets of Ghost Town (1950)
  47. Across the Badlands (1950)
  48. Raiders of Tomahawk Creek (1950)
  49. Frontier Outpost (1950)
  50. Lightning Guns (1950)
  51. Prairie Roundup (1951)
  52. Ridin' the Outlaw Trail (1951)
  53. Fort Savage Raiders (1951)
  54. Snake River Desperadoes (1951)
  55. Bonanza Town (1951)
  56. Cyclone Fury (1951)
  57. The Kid from Amarillo (1951)
  58. Pecos River (1951)
  59. Smoky Canyon (1952)
  60. The Hawk of Wild River (1952)
  61. Laramie Mountains (1952)
  62. The Rough, Tough West (1952)
  63. Junction City (1952)
  64. The Kid from Broken Gun (1952)

== 66 ==
- Hopalong Cassidy (American-Western)
  1. Hop-Along Cassidy (1935) (reissued as "Hopalong Cassidy Enters")
  2. The Eagle's Brood (1935)
  3. Bar 20 Rides Again (1935)
  4. Call of the Prairie (1936)
  5. Three on the Trail (1936)
  6. Heart of the West (1936)
  7. Hopalong Cassidy Returns (1936)
  8. Trail Dust (1936)
  9. Borderland (1937)
  10. Hills of Old Wyoming (1937)
  11. North of the Rio Grande (1937)
  12. Rustlers' Valley (1937)
  13. Hopalong Rides Again (1937)
  14. Texas Trail (1937)
  15. Partners of the Plains (1938)
  16. Cassidy of Bar 20 (1938)
  17. Heart of Arizona (1938)
  18. Bar 20 Justice (1938)
  19. Pride of the West (1938)
  20. In Old Mexico (1938)
  21. The Frontiersmen (1938) (sometimes mistakenly listed as "The Frontiersman")
  22. Sunset Trail (1939)
  23. Silver on the Sage (1939)
  24. Renegade Trail (1939)
  25. Range War (1939)
  26. Law of the Pampas (1939)
  27. Santa Fe Marshal (1940)
  28. The Showdown (1940)
  29. Hidden Gold (1940)
  30. Stagecoach War (1940)
  31. Three Men from Texas (1940)
  32. Doomed Caravan (1941)
  33. In Old Colorado (1941)
  34. Border Vigilantes (1941)
  35. Pirates on Horseback (1941)
  36. Wide Open Town (1941)
  37. Stick to Your Guns (1941)
  38. Secrets of the Wasteland (1941)
  39. Twilight on the Trail (1941)
  40. Outlaws of the Desert (1941)
  41. Riders of the Timberline (1941)
  42. The Leather Burners (1943)
  43. Hoppy Serves a Writ (1943)
  44. Undercover Man (1942)
  45. Border Patrol (1943)
  46. Lost Canyon (1943)
  47. Colt Comrades (1943)
  48. Bar 20 (1943)
  49. False Colors (1943)
  50. Riders of the Deadline (1943)
  51. Texas Masquerade (1944)
  52. Lumberjack (1944)
  53. Mystery Man (1944)
  54. Forty Thieves (1944)
  55. The Devil's Playground (1946)
  56. Fool's Gold (1947)
  57. Unexpected Guest (1947)
  58. Dangerous Venture (1947)
  59. Hoppy's Holiday (1947)
  60. The Marauders (1947)
  61. Silent Conflict (1948)
  62. The Dead Don't Dream (1948)
  63. Sinister Journey (1948)
  64. Borrowed Trouble (1948)
  65. False Paradise (1948)
  66. Strange Gamble (1948)

== 71 ==
- Super Sentai
  1. Himitsu Sentai Gorenger (1975)
  2. Himitsu Sentai Gorenger: The Blue Fortress (1975)
  3. Himitsu Sentai Gorenger: The Red Death Match (1976)
  4. Himitsu Sentai Gorenger: The Bomb Hurricane (1976)
  5. Himitsu Sentai Gorenger: Fire Mountain's Final Explosion (1976)
  6. J.A.K.Q. Dengekitai (1977)
  7. J.A.K.Q. Dengekitai vs. Gorenger (1978)
  8. Battle Fever J (1979)
  9. Denshi Sentai Denziman (1980)
  10. Taiyo Sentai Sun Vulcan (1981)
  11. Dai Sentai Goggle-V (1982)
  12. Kagaku Sentai Dynaman (1983)
  13. Choudenshi Bioman (1984)
  14. Dengeki Sentai Changeman (1985)
  15. Dengeki Sentai Changeman: Shuttle Base! Crisis! (1985)
  16. Choushinsei Flashman (1986)
  17. Choushinsei Flashman: Big Rally! Titan Boy!! (1987)
  18. Hikari Sentai Maskman (1987)
  19. Kousoku Sentai Turboranger (1989)
  20. Gosei Sentai Dairanger (1993)
  21. Ninja Sentai Kakuranger (1994)
  22. Super Sentai World (1994)
  23. Toei Hero Daishugō (1994)
  24. Chōriki Sentai Ohranger (1995)
  25. Hyakujuu Sentai Gaoranger: The Fire Mountain Roars (2001)
  26. Ninpuu Sentai Hurricaneger: Shushutto The Movie (2002)
  27. Bakuryū Sentai Abaranger DELUXE: Abare Summer is Freezing Cold! (2003)
  28. Tokusou Sentai Dekaranger The Movie: Full Blast Action (2004)
  29. Mahou Sentai Magiranger The Movie: Bride of Infershia ~Maagi Magi Giruma Jinga~ (2005)
  30. GoGo Sentai Boukenger The Movie: The Greatest Precious (2006)
  31. Juken Sentai Gekiranger: Nei-Nei! Hou-Hou! Hong Kong Decisive Battle (2007)
  32. Engine Sentai Go-onger: Boom Boom! Bang Bang! GekijōBang!! (2008)
  33. Engine Sentai Go-onger vs. Gekiranger (2009)
  34. Samurai Sentai Shinkenger the Movie: The Fateful War (2009)
  35. Samurai Sentai Shinkenger vs. Go-onger: GinmakuBang!! (2010)
  36. Tensou Sentai Goseiger: Epic on the Movie (2010)
  37. Tensou Sentai Goseiger vs. Shinkenger: Epic on Ginmaku (2011)
  38. Gokaiger Goseiger Super Sentai 199 Hero Great Battle (2011)
  39. Kaizoku Sentai Gokaiger the Movie: The Flying Ghost Ship (2011)
  40. Kaizoku Sentai Gokaiger vs. Space Sheriff Gavan: The Movie (2012)
  41. Kamen Rider × Super Sentai: Super Hero Taisen (2012)
  42. Tokumei Sentai Go-Busters the Movie: Protect the Tokyo Enetower! (2012)
  43. Tokumei Sentai Go-Busters vs. Kaizoku Sentai Gokaiger: The Movie (2013)
  44. Kamen Rider × Super Sentai × Space Sheriff: Super Hero Taisen Z (2013)
  45. Zyuden Sentai Kyoryuger: Gaburincho of Music (2013)
  46. Zyuden Sentai Kyoryuger vs. Go-Busters: The Great Dinosaur Battle! Farewell Our Eternal Friends (2014)
  47. Heisei Riders vs. Shōwa Riders: Kamen Rider Taisen feat. Super Sentai (2014)
  48. Ressha Sentai ToQger the Movie: Galaxy Line S.O.S. (2014)
  49. Ressha Sentai ToQger vs. Kyoryuger: The Movie (2015)
  50. Super Hero Taisen GP: Kamen Rider 3 (2015)
  51. Shuriken Sentai Ninninger the Movie: The Dinosaur Lord's Splendid Ninja Scroll! (2015)
  52. Shuriken Sentai Ninninger vs. ToQger the Movie: Ninja in Wonderland (2016)
  53. Doubutsu Sentai Zyuohger the Movie: The Exciting Circus Panic! (2016)
  54. Doubutsu Sentai Zyuohger vs. Ninninger the Movie: Super Sentai's Message from the Future (2016)
  55. Kamen Rider × Super Sentai: Ultra Super Hero Taisen (2017)
  56. Uchu Sentai Kyuranger the Movie: Gase Indaver Strikes Back (2017)
  57. Kaitou Sentai Lupinranger VS Keisatsu Sentai Patranger en Film (2018)
  58. Kishiryu Sentai Ryusoulger the Movie: Time Slip! Dinosaur Panic (2019)
  59. Kishiryu Sentai Ryusoulger VS Lupinranger VS Patranger (2020)
  60. Mashin Sentai Kiramager: Episode Zero (2020)
  61. Mashin Sentai Kiramager The Movie: Bee-Bop Dream (2021)
  62. Kikai Sentai Zenkaiger The Movie: Red Battle! All Sentai Rally!! (2021)
  63. Kishiryu Sentai Ryusoulger Special Chapter: Memory of Soulmates (2021)
  64. Mashin Sentai Kiramager vs. Ryusoulger (2021)
  65. Saber + Zenkaiger: Superhero Senki (2021)
  66. Kaizoku Sentai: Ten Gokaiger (2021)
  67. Kikai Sentai Zenkaiger vs. Kiramager vs. Senpaiger (2022)
  68. Avataro Sentai Donbrothers The Movie: New First Love Hero (2022)
  69. Ninpu Sentai Hurricaneger Degozaru! Shushuuto 20th Anniversary (2023)
  70. Avataro Sentai Donbrothers vs. Zenkaiger (2023)
  71. Bakuryuu Sentai Abaranger 20th: The Unforgivable Abare (2023)

== 80 ==
- Wong Fei Hung (Chinese films)
  1. Huang Fei-hong zhuan: Bian feng mie zhu (1949)
  2. Huang Fei-hong chuan (1949)
  3. Huang Fei-hong chuan di san ji xie zhan Liuhua qiao (1950)
  4. Huang Fei-hong chuan da jie ju (1951)
  5. Huang Fei-hong xie ran Furong gu (1952)
  6. Huang Feihong yu jiu Haichuang si shang ji (1953)
  7. Huang Feihong yu jiu Haichuang si xia ji (1953)
  8. Huang Fei-hong yi gun fu san ba (1953)
  9. Huang Fei-hong chu shi wu ying jiao (1954)
  10. Huang Fei-hong yu Lin Shi-rong (1955)
  11. Huang Fei-hong chang ti jian ba (1955)
  12. Huang Fei-hong Huadi chuang po (1955)
  13. Huang Fei-hong wen zhen si pai lou (1955)
  14. Huang Fei-hong yi jiu mai yu can (1956)
  15. Huang Fei-hong yi jiu long mu miao (1956)
  16. Huang Fei-hong tie ji dou wu gong (1956)
  17. Huang Fei-hong xing juan hui qi lin (1956)
  18. Huang Fei-hong shui di san qin Su Shulian (1956)
  19. Huang Fei-hong tian hou miao jin xiang (1956)
  20. Huang Fei-hong Shamian fu shen quan (1956)
  21. Huang Fei-hong san hu nu biao shi (1956)
  22. Huang Fei-hong qi shi hui jin long (1956)
  23. Huang Fei-hong qi dou huo qi lin (1956)
  24. Huang Fei-hong nu tun shi er shi (1956)
  25. Huang Fei-hong long zhou duo jin (1956)
  26. Huang Fei-hong huo shao Daoshatou (1956)
  27. Huang Fei-hong lei tai bi wu (1956)
  28. Huang Fei-hong gu si jiu qing seng (1956)
  29. Huang Fei-hong Guanshan da he shou (1956)
  30. Huang Fei-hong gong chuan jian ba (1956)
  31. Huang Fei-hong du bei dou wu long (1956)
  32. Huang Fei-hong da zhan Shuangmendi (1956)
  33. Huang Fei-hong da nao hua deng (1956)
  34. Huang Fei-hong da nao Foshan (1956)
  35. Huang Fei-hong fu er hu (1956)
  36. Huang Fei-hong heng sao Xiao Beijiang (1956)
  37. Huang Fei-hong hua ting feng yun (1956)
  38. Huang Fei-hong Henan yu xie zhan (1957)
  39. Huang Fei-hong die xie ma an shan (1957)
  40. Huang Fei-hong da po fei dao dang (1957)
  41. Huang Fei-hong er long zheng zhu (1957)
  42. Huang Fei-hong ye tan hei long shan (1957)
  43. Huang Fei-hong xie jian su po wu (1957)
  44. Huang Fei-hong tie ji dou shen ying (1958)
  45. Huang Fei-hong da po Ma gu zhuang (1958)
  46. Huang Fei-hong da po jin zhao zhang (1958)
  47. Huang Fei-hong da nao feng huang gang (1958)
  48. Huang Fei-hong long zheng hou dou (1958)
  49. Huang Fei-hong lei tai dou san hu (1958)
  50. Huang Fei-hong bei kun hei di yu (1959)
  51. Huang Fei-hong hu peng fu hu (1959)
  52. Huang Fei-hong yi guan cai hong qiao (1959)
  53. Huang Fei-hong lei tai zheng ba zhan (1960)
  54. Huang Fei-hong yuan da po wu hu zhen (1961)
  55. Huang Fei-hong hu zhao hui qan ying (1967)
  56. Huang Fei-hong wei zhen wu yang cheng (1968)
  57. Huang Fei-hong xing shi du ba mei hua zhuang (1968)
  58. Huang Fei-hong rou bo hei ba wang (1968)
  59. Huang Fei-hong quan wang zheng ba (1968)
  60. Huang Fei-hong zui da ba jin gang (1968)
  61. Huang Fei-hong yu xie liu huang gu (1969)
  62. Huang Fei-hong qiao duo sha yu qing (1969)
  63. Huang Fei-hong hu de dou wu lang (1969)
  64. Huang Fei Hong yong po lie huo zhen (1973)
  65. Huang Fei-hong xiao lin quan (1974)
  66. Huang Fei Hong yi qu ding cai di (1974)
  67. Challenge of the Masters (1976)
  68. Huang fei hong si da di zi (1977)
  69. Magnificent Butcher (1979)
  70. Huang Fei Hong yu gui jiao qi (1980)
  71. Dreadnaught (1981)
  72. Martial Club (1981)
  73. Foo gwai lit che (1986)
  74. Long xing tian xia (1989)
  75. Huang Fei Hong xiao zhuan (1992)
  76. Huang Fei-hong xi lie zhi yi dai shi (1992)
  77. Huang Fei Hong zhi nan er dang bao guo (1993)
  78. Huang Fei Hong dui Huang Fei Hong (1993)
  79. Huang Fei-Hong zhi gui jiao qi (1993)
  80. Wong Fei-hung chi tit gai dau neung gung (1993)

== 90 ==
- Kamen Rider *
  1. Go! Go! Kamen Rider (1971)
  2. Kamen Rider vs. Shocker (1972)
  3. Kamen Rider vs. Hell Ambassador (1972)
  4. Kamen Rider V3 (1973)
  5. Kamen Rider V3 vs. Destron Monsters (1973)
  6. Kamen Rider X (1974)
  7. Kamen Rider X: The Five Riders Vs. King Dark (1974)
  8. Hanuman and the Five Riders (unofficial release) (1974)
  9. Kamen Rider Stronger (1975)
  10. All Together! Seven Kamen Riders (1976)
  11. This Is Kamen Rider BLACK (1987)
  12. Kamen Rider BLACK: Hurry to Evil Island (1988)
  13. Kamen Rider BLACK: Fear! Evil Monster Mansion (1989)
  14. Kamen Rider ZO (1993)
  15. Kamen Rider J (1994)
  16. Kamen Rider World (1994)
  17. Kamen Rider Kuuga: New Year's Special (2000)
  18. Kamen Rider Kuuga: Versus the Strong Monster Go-Jiino-Da (2000)
  19. Kamen Rider Agito: Project G4 (2001)
  20. Kamen Rider Agito Special: Another New Henshin (2001)
  21. Kamen Rider Agito: Three Rider TV-kun Special (2001)
  22. Kamen Rider Ryuki: Episode Final (2002)
  23. Kamen Rider Ryuki Special: 13 Riders (2002)
  24. Kamen Rider Ryuki: Kamen Rider Ryuki Versus Kamen Rider Agito (2002)
  25. Kamen Rider 555: Paradise Lost (2003)
  26. Kamen Rider 555: The Musical (2003)
  27. Kamen Rider Blade: Missing Ace (2004)
  28. Kamen Rider Blade: Blade vs. Blade (2004)
  29. Kamen Rider Blade: New Generation (2004)
  30. Kamen Rider Hibiki and the Seven War Demons (2005)
  31. Kamen Rider Hibiki: Asumu Henshin: You Can Be An Oni Too (2005)
  32. Kamen Rider the First (2005)
  33. Kamen Rider Kabuto: God Speed Love (2006)
  34. Kamen Rider Kabuto & Gatack: Birth! Enter Hyper Gatack! (2006)
  35. Kamen Rider the Next (2007)
  36. Kamen Rider Den-O: I’m Born! (2007)
  37. Saraba Kamen Rider Den-O: Final Countdown (2008)
  38. Kamen Rider Den-O & Kiva: Climax Deka (2008)
  39. Kamen Rider Kiva: King of the Castle in the Demon World (2008)
  40. Cho Kamen Rider Den-O & Decade Neo Generations: The Onigashima Warship (2009)
  41. Kamen Rider Decade: All Riders vs. Dai-Shocker (2009)
  42. Kamen Rider × Kamen Rider W & Decade: Movie War 2010 (2009)
  43. Episode Red: Zero no Star Twinkle (2010)
  44. Episode Blue: The Dispatched Imagin is Newtral (2010)
  45. Episode Yellow: Treasure de End Pirates (2010)
  46. Kamen Rider: The Fearful Global Warming Plan (2010)
  47. Kamen Rider W Forever: A to Z/The Gaia Memories of Fate (2010)
  48. Kamen Rider × Kamen Rider OOO & W Featuring Skull: Movie War Core (2010)
  49. OOO, Den-O, All Riders: Let's Go Kamen Riders (2011)
  50. Kamen Rider OOO Wonderful: The Shogun and the 21 Core Medals (2011)
  51. Kamen Rider × Kamen Rider Fourze & OOO: Movie War Mega Max (2011)
  52. Kamen Rider × Super Sentai: Super Hero Taisen (2012)
  53. Kamen Rider Fourze the Movie: Everyone, Space is Here! (2012)
  54. Kamen Rider × Kamen Rider Wizard & Fourze: Movie War Ultimatum (2012)
  55. Kamen Rider × Super Sentai × Space Sheriff: Super Hero Taisen Z (2013)
  56. Kamen Rider Wizard in Magic Land (2013)
  57. Kamen Rider × Kamen Rider Gaim & Wizard: The Fateful Sengoku Movie Battle (2013)
  58. Heisei Rider vs. Showa Rider: Kamen Rider Taisen feat. Super Sentai (2014)
  59. Kamen Rider Gaim: Great Soccer Battle! Golden Fruits Cup! (2014)
  60. Kamen Rider × Kamen Rider Drive & Gaim: Movie War Full Throttle (2014)
  61. Super Hero Taisen GP: Kamen Rider 3 (2015)
  62. Kamen Rider Drive: Surprise Future (2015)
  63. Kamen Rider × Kamen Rider Ghost & Drive: Super Movie Wars Genesis (2015)
  64. Kamen Rider 1 (2016)
  65. Kamen Rider Ghost: The 100 Eyecons and Ghost's Fateful Moment (2016)
  66. Kamen Rider Heisei Generations: Dr. Pac-Man vs. Ex-Aid & Ghost with Legend Riders (2016)
  67. Kamen Rider × Super Sentai: Chou Super Hero Taisen (2017)
  68. Kamen Rider Ex-Aid: True Ending (2017)
  69. Kamen Rider Heisei Generations FINAL: Build & Ex-Aid with Legend Riders (2017)
  70. Kamen Rider Build: Be The One (2018)
  71. Kamen Rider Heisei Generations FOREVER (2018)
  72. Kamen Rider Zi-O: Over Quartzer (2019)
  73. Kamen Rider: Reiwa The First Generation (2019)
  74. Kamen Rider Den-O: Pretty Den-O Appears! (2020)
  75. Kamen Rider Zero-One: REAL×TIME (2020)
  76. Kamen Rider Saber: The Phoenix Swordsman and the Book of Ruin (2020)
  77. Kamen Rider Zero-One: REAL×TIME (2020)
  78. Zero-One Others: Kamen Rider MetsubouJinrai (2021)
  79. Saber + Zenkaiger: Superhero Senki (2021)
  80. Kamen Rider Revice: The Movie (2021)
  81. Zero-One Others: Kamen Rider Vulcan & Valkyrie (2021)
  82. Kamen Rider: Beyond Generations (2021)
  83. Kamen Rider Saber: Trio of Deep Sin (2022)
  84. Kamen Rider OOO 10th: Core Medal of Resurrection (2022)
  85. Kamen Rider Revice: Battle Familia (2022)
  86. Kamen Rider Geats × Revice: Movie Battle Royale (2022)
  87. Revice Forward: Kamen Rider Live & Evil & Demons (2023)
  88. Shin Kamen Rider (2023)
  89. Kamen Rider Geats: 4 Aces and the Black Fox (2023)
  90. Kamen Rider 555 20th: Paradise Regained (2024)
