= The Three Mesquiteers =

American film series

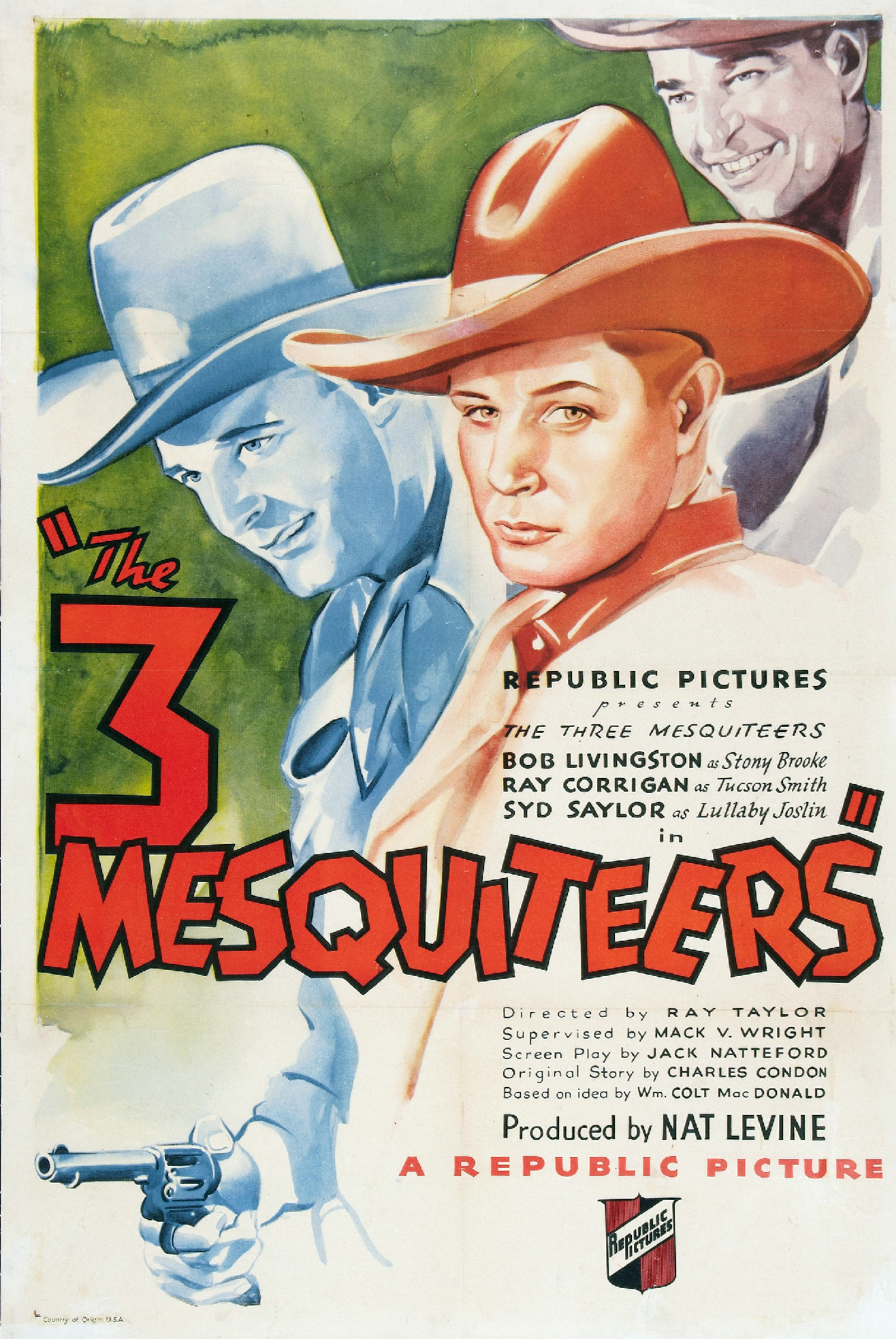
- Poster for The Three Mesquiteers (1936)
- Written by: William Colt MacDonald (based on novels by)
- Starring: Bob Livingston; Ray Corrigan; Syd Saylor; Max Terhune; John Wayne; Ralph Byrd; Duncan Renaldo; Raymond Hatton; Tom Tyler; Bob Steele; Rufe Davis; Jimmie Dodd
- Production company: Republic Pictures
- Country: United States
- Language: English

The Three Mesquiteers is the umbrella title for a Republic Pictures series of 51 American Western B-movies released between 1936 and 1943. The films, featuring a trio of Old West adventurers, was based on a series of Western novels by William Colt MacDonald. The eponymous trio, with occasional variations, were called Stony Brooke, Tucson Smith and Lullaby Joslin. John Wayne, who played Stony Brooke in eight of the films in 1938 and 1939, was the best-known actor in the series. Other leads included Bob Livingston, Ray "Crash" Corrigan, Max Terhune, Bob Steele, Rufe Davis and Tom Tyler.

== Background ==
William Colt MacDonald wrote a series of novels about The Three Mesquiteers, beginning with The Law of 45's in 1933. The name "Mesquiteer" was a play on words, referring to mesquite, a plant common in the Western United States, and the characters of the 1844 Alexandre Dumas novel The Three Musketeers. The film series blended the traditional Western period with more modern elements, a technique used in other B-Western films and serials. Toward the end of the series, during World War II, the trio of cowboys were opposing Nazis. One film, Outlaws of Sonora (1938), has a revisionist theme as an early example of the outlaw/gunfighter sub-genre.

== Previous non-Republic films ==
- The Law of the 45's (1935, First Division Pictures) starred Guinn "Big Boy" Williams as Tucson "Two Gun" Smith and Al. St. John as Stoney Martin; there was no Lullaby Joslin in the film.
- Powdersmoke Range (1935, RKO Pictures) starred Harry Carey as Tucson Smith, Hoot Gibson as Stony Brooke, and Guinn "Big Boy" Williams as Lullaby Joslin.
- Too Much Beef (1935, Grand National Pictures) starred Rex Bell as Johnny Argyle, who adopts the name Tucson Smith as an undercover identity.

== The Mesquiteers ==
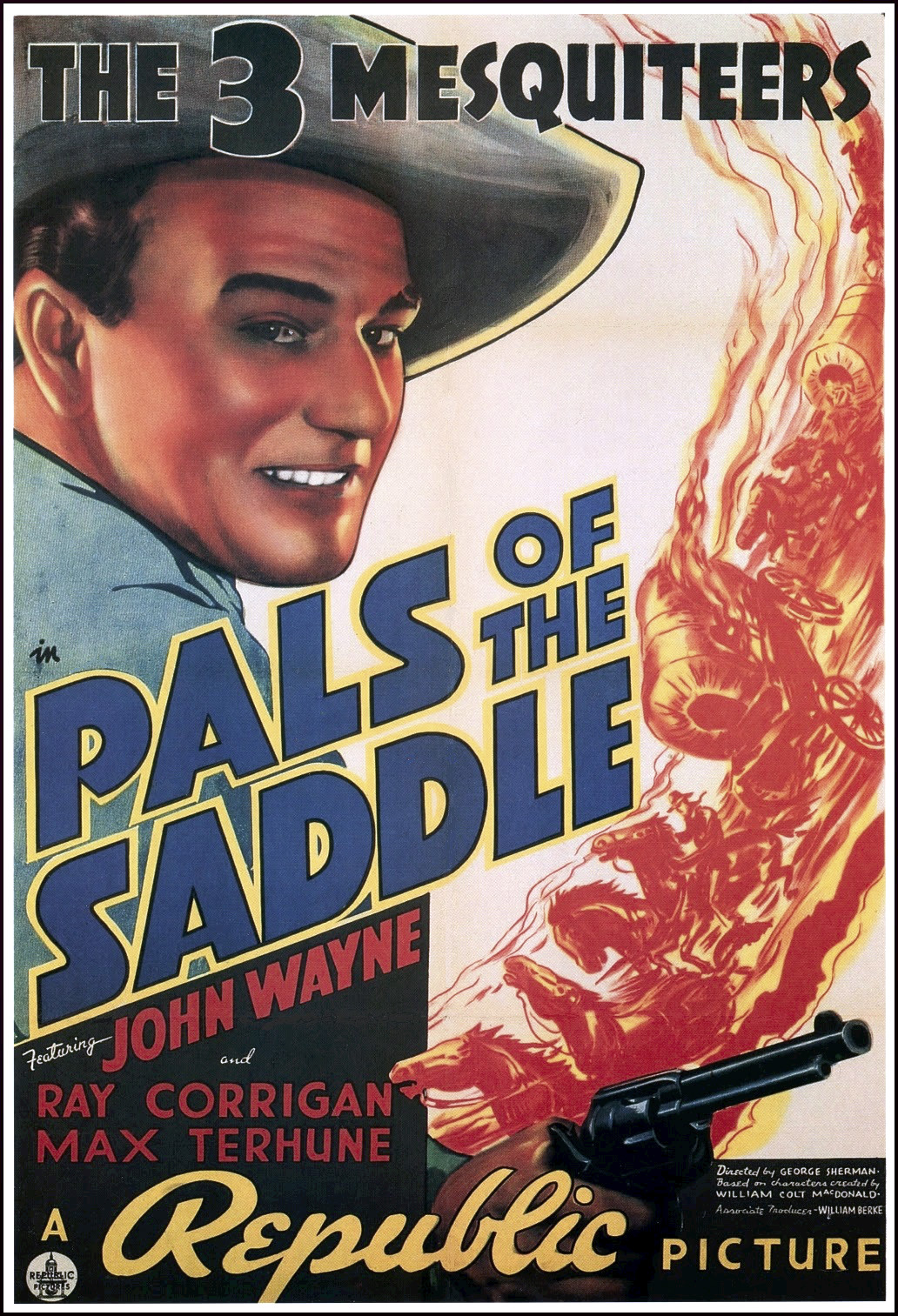
Theatrical release poster for Pals of the Saddle (1938) starring John Wayne

In the Republic series, the cast list varied but always featured a trio of cowboys. The original and most frequently recurring Mesquiteer characters were:

- Stony Brooke
  (played by Bob Livingston in 29 films, John Wayne in 8 films, and Tom Tyler in 13 films)
- Tucson Smith
  (played by Ray Corrigan in 24 films, and by Bob Steele in 20 films)
- Lullaby Joslin
  (played by Syd Saylor in one film, Max Terhune in 21 films, Rufe Davis in 14 films, and by Jimmie Dodd in six films)

Other members of the trio over the entire series were:

- Ralph Byrd as Larry Smith (one film, replacing Bob Livingston, injured during filming)
- Raymond Hatton as Rusty Joslin (nine films)
- Duncan Renaldo as Rico Rinaldo (seven films)
- Kirby Grant as Tex Reilly (in Red River Range, Tex and Stony Brooke swap identities so that Stony can take Tex's place in an undercover investigation of cattle rustlers)

Stars in supporting roles at various times included:

- Noah Beery
- Henry Brandon
- Louise Brooks
- Yakima Canutt
- Chief Thundercloud
- Rita Hayworth (billed as Rita Cansino, her real name)
- Jennifer Jones
- Carole Landis
- George Montgomery
- Roy Rogers (billed as Dick Weston)
- Robert Warwick
- Hank Worden

Actress Lois Collier was sometimes called the Fourth Mesquiteer because seven of the movies featured her as the female lead.

Max Terhune, when playing Lullaby Joslin, would sometimes appear with a ventriloquist dummy called Elmer.

== Reception ==
The Three Mesquiteers series was extremely popular at the time of its release. The series was the only one of its kind to be specifically named and ranked in contemporary polls of the top Western film stars. From 1937 to the end of the series in 1943, the Motion Picture Herald consistently ranked the series in its top 10, reaching a peak of fifth place in 1938, when a pre-Stagecoach John Wayne was the series lead.

== Influence ==
The success of the series led to many "trigger trio" imitators at other studios.

The first was The Range Busters (1940–43) from Monogram Pictures, which starred original Mesquiteer Ray "Crash" Corrigan as the character "Crash" Corrigan. Monogram also released The Rough Riders (1941–42), again poaching a Mesquiteer in the form of Raymond Hatton, and The Trail Blazers (1943–44).

Producers Releasing Corporation produced two similar series, The Texas Rangers (1942–45) and The Frontier Marshals (1942).

On television, NBC broadcast Laredo from 1965 to 1967. It starred Neville Brand, William Smith and Peter Brown as a trio of Texas Rangers.

== Films ==
Republic Pictures produced 51 films in The Three Mesquiteers series between 1936 and 1943:

Year	Title	Director	Mesquiteers			Lead actress
1936	1. The Three Mesquiteers	Ray Taylor	Bob Livingston (Stony Brooke)	Ray Corrigan (Tucson Smith)	Syd Saylor (Lullaby Joslin)	Kay Hughes
1936	2. Ghost-Town Gold	Joseph Kane	Bob Livingston (Stony Brooke)	Ray Corrigan (Tucson Smith)	Max Terhune (Lullaby Joslin)	Kay Hughes
1936	3. Roarin' Lead	Sam Newfield; Mack V. Wright	Bob Livingston (Stony Brooke)	Ray Corrigan (Tucson Smith)	Max Terhune (Lullaby Joslin)	Christine Maple
1937	4. Riders of the Whistling Skull	Mack V. Wright	Bob Livingston (Stony Brooke)	Ray Corrigan (Tucson Smith)	Max Terhune (Lullaby Joslin)	Mary Russell
1937	5. Hit the Saddle	Mack V. Wright	Bob Livingston (Stony Brooke)	Ray Corrigan (Tucson Smith)	Max Terhune (Lullaby Joslin)	Rita Cansino
1937	6. Gunsmoke Ranch	Joseph Kane	Bob Livingston (Stony Brooke)	Ray Corrigan (Tucson Smith)	Max Terhune (Lullaby Joslin)	Jean Carmen
1937	7. Come On, Cowboys	Joseph Kane	Bob Livingston (Stony Brooke)	Ray Corrigan (Tucson Smith)	Max Terhune (Lullaby Joslin)	Maxine Doyle
1937	8. Range Defenders	Mack V. Wright	Bob Livingston (Stony Brooke)	Ray Corrigan (Tucson Smith)	Max Terhune (Lullaby Joslin)	Eleanor Stewart
1937	9. Heart of the Rockies	Joseph Kane	Bob Livingston (Stony Brooke)	Ray Corrigan (Tucson Smith)	Max Terhune (Lullaby Joslin)	Lynne Roberts
1937	10. The Trigger Trio	William Witney	Ralph Byrd (Larry Smith, Tucson's brother)	Ray Corrigan (Tucson Smith)	Max Terhune (Lullaby Joslin)	Sandra Corday
1937	11. Wild Horse Rodeo	George Sherman	Bob Livingston (Stony Brooke)	Ray Corrigan (Tucson Smith)	Max Terhune (Lullaby Joslin)	June Martel
1938	12. The Purple Vigilantes	George Sherman	Bob Livingston (Stony Brooke)	Ray Corrigan (Tucson Smith)	Max Terhune (Lullaby Joslin)	Joan Barclay
1938	13. Call the Mesquiteers	John English	Bob Livingston (Stony Brooke)	Ray Corrigan (Tucson Smith)	Max Terhune (Lullaby Joslin)	Lynne Roberts
1938	14. Outlaws of Sonora	George Sherman	Bob Livingston (Stony Brooke)	Ray Corrigan (Tucson Smith)	Max Terhune (Lullaby Joslin)	none
1938	15. Riders of the Black Hills	George Sherman	Bob Livingston (Stony Brooke)	Ray Corrigan (Tucson Smith)	Max Terhune (Lullaby Joslin)	Ann Evers
1938	16. Heroes of the Hills	George Sherman	Bob Livingston (Stony Brooke)	Ray Corrigan (Tucson Smith)	Max Terhune (Lullaby Joslin)	Priscilla Lawson
1938	17. Pals of the Saddle	George Sherman	John Wayne (Stony Brooke)	Ray Corrigan (Tucson Smith)	Max Terhune (Lullaby Joslin)	Doreen McKay
1938	18. Overland Stage Raiders	George Sherman	John Wayne (Stony Brooke)	Ray Corrigan (Tucson Smith)	Max Terhune (Lullaby Joslin)	Louise Brooks
1938	19. Santa Fe Stampede	George Sherman	John Wayne (Stony Brooke)	Ray Corrigan (Tucson Smith)	Max Terhune (Lullaby Joslin)	June Martel
1938	20. Red River Range	George Sherman	John Wayne (Stony Brooke)	Ray Corrigan (Tucson Smith)	Max Terhune (Lullaby Joslin)	Lorna Gray
1939	21. The Night Riders	George Sherman	John Wayne (Stony Brooke)	Ray Corrigan (Tucson Smith)	Max Terhune (Lullaby Joslin)	Doreen McKay
1939	22. Three Texas Steers	George Sherman	John Wayne (Stony Brooke)	Ray Corrigan (Tucson Smith)	Max Terhune (Lullaby Joslin)	Carole Landis
1939	23. Wyoming Outlaw	George Sherman	John Wayne (Stony Brooke)	Ray Corrigan (Tucson Smith)	Raymond Hatton (Rusty Joslin)	Pamela Blake
1939	24. New Frontier	George Sherman	John Wayne (Stony Brooke)	Ray Corrigan (Tucson Smith)	Raymond Hatton (Rusty Joslin)	Jennifer Jones
1939	25. The Kansas Terrors	George Sherman	Bob Livingston (Stony Brooke)	Duncan Renaldo (Rico Renaldo)	Raymond Hatton (Rusty Joslin)	Julie Bishop
1939	26. Cowboys from Texas	George Sherman	Bob Livingston (Stony Brooke)	Duncan Renaldo (Rico Renaldo)	Raymond Hatton (Rusty Joslin)	Carole Landis
1940	27. Heroes of the Saddle	William Witney	Bob Livingston (Stony Brooke)	Duncan Renaldo (Rico Renaldo)	Raymond Hatton (Rusty Joslin)	none
1940	28. Pioneers of the West	Lester Orlebeck	Bob Livingston (Stony Brooke)	Duncan Renaldo (Rico Renaldo)	Raymond Hatton (Rusty Joslin)	Beatrice Roberts
1940	29. Covered Wagon Days	George Sherman	Bob Livingston (Stony Brooke)	Duncan Renaldo (Rico Renaldo)	Raymond Hatton (Rusty Joslin)	Kay Griffith
1940	30. Rocky Mountain Rangers	George Sherman	Bob Livingston (Stony Brooke)	Duncan Renaldo (Rico Renaldo)	Raymond Hatton (Rusty Joslin)	Rosella Towne
1940	31. Oklahoma Renegades	Nate Watt	Bob Livingston (Stony Brooke)	Duncan Renaldo (Rico Renaldo)	Raymond Hatton (Rusty Joslin)	Florine McKinney
1940	32. Under Texas Skies	George Sherman	Bob Livingston (Stony Brooke)	Bob Steele (Tucson Smith)	Rufe Davis (Lullaby Joslin)	Lois Ranson
1940	33. The Trail Blazers	George Sherman	Bob Livingston (Stony Brooke)	Bob Steele (Tucson Smith)	Rufe Davis (Lullaby Joslin)	Pauline Moore
1940	34. Lone Star Raiders	George Sherman	Bob Livingston (Stony Brooke)	Bob Steele (Tucson Smith)	Rufe Davis (Lullaby Joslin)	June Johnson
1941	35. Prairie Pioneers	Lester Orlebeck	Bob Livingston (Stony Brooke)	Bob Steele (Tucson Smith)	Rufe Davis (Lullaby Joslin)	Esther Estrella
1941	36. Pals of the Pecos	Lester Orlebeck	Bob Livingston (Stony Brooke)	Bob Steele (Tucson Smith)	Rufe Davis (Lullaby Joslin)	June Johnson
1941	37. Saddlemates	Lester Orlebeck	Bob Livingston (Stony Brooke)	Bob Steele (Tucson Smith)	Rufe Davis (Lullaby Joslin)	Gale Storm
1941	38. Gangs of Sonora	John English	Bob Livingston (Stony Brooke)	Bob Steele (Tucson Smith)	Rufe Davis (Lullaby Joslin)	June Johnson
1941	39. Outlaws of Cherokee Trail	Lester Orlebeck	Tom Tyler (Stony Brooke)	Bob Steele (Tucson Smith)	Rufe Davis (Lullaby Joslin)	Lois Collier
1941	40. Gauchos of El Dorado	Lester Orlebeck	Tom Tyler (Stony Brooke)	Bob Steele (Tucson Smith)	Rufe Davis (Lullaby Joslin)	Lois Collier
1941	41. West of Cimarron	Lester Orlebeck	Tom Tyler (Stony Brooke)	Bob Steele (Tucson Smith)	Rufe Davis (Lullaby Joslin)	Lois Collier
1942	42. Code of the Outlaw	John English	Tom Tyler (Stony Brooke)	Bob Steele (Tucson Smith)	Rufe Davis (Lullaby Joslin)	none
1942	43. Raiders of the Range	John English	Tom Tyler (Stony Brooke)	Bob Steele (Tucson Smith)	Rufe Davis (Lullaby Joslin)	Lois Collier
1942	44. Westward Ho	John English	Tom Tyler (Stony Brooke)	Bob Steele (Tucson Smith)	Rufe Davis (Lullaby Joslin)	Lois Collier
1942	45. The Phantom Plainsmen	John English	Tom Tyler (Stony Brooke)	Bob Steele (Tucson Smith)	Rufe Davis (Lullaby Joslin)	Lois Collier
1942	46. Shadows on the Sage	Lester Orlebeck	Tom Tyler (Stony Brooke)	Bob Steele (Tucson Smith)	Jimmie Dodd (Lullaby Joslin)	Cheryl Walker
1942	47. Valley of Hunted Men	John English	Tom Tyler (Stony Brooke)	Bob Steele (Tucson Smith)	Jimmie Dodd (Lullaby Joslin)	none
1943	48. Thundering Trails	John English	Tom Tyler (Stony Brooke)	Bob Steele (Tucson Smith)	Jimmie Dodd (Lullaby Joslin)	Nell O'Day
1943	49. The Blocked Trail	Elmer Clifton	Tom Tyler (Stony Brooke)	Bob Steele (Tucson Smith)	Jimmie Dodd (Lullaby Joslin)	Helen Deverell
1943	50. Santa Fe Scouts	Howard Bretherton	Tom Tyler (Stony Brooke)	Bob Steele (Tucson Smith)	Jimmie Dodd (Lullaby Joslin)	Lois Collier
1943	51. Riders of the Rio Grande	Howard Bretherton	Tom Tyler (Stony Brooke)	Bob Steele (Tucson Smith)	Jimmie Dodd (Lullaby Joslin)	Lorraine Miller
