= Prairie Pioneers =

1941 film

- Film poster
- Directed by: Lester Orlebeck
- Written by: William Colt MacDonald; Barry Shipman
- Produced by: Louis Gray
- Starring: Robert Livingston; Bob Steele; Rufe Davis
- Cinematography: Ernest Miller
- Edited by: Ray Snyder
- Music by: Cy Feuer
- Production company: Republic Pictures
- Distributed by: Republic Pictures
- Release date: February 16, 1941
- Running time: 58 minutes
- Country: United States
- Language: English

Prairie Pioneers is a 1941 American Western film directed by Lester Orlebeck and starring Robert Livingston, Bob Steele and Esther Estrella. It was part of the "Three Mesquiteers" B-movie series released by Republic Pictures. Location shooting took place at the Iverson Ranch.

== Cast ==
- Robert Livingston as Stony Brooke
- Bob Steele as Tucson Smith
- Rufe Davis as Lullaby Joslin
- Esther Estrella as Dolores Ortega
- Robert Kellard as Roberto Ortega
- Guy D'Ennery as Don Miguel Ortega
- Davison Clark as Don Carlos Montoya
- Jack Ingram as Henchman Wade
- Kenneth MacDonald as Fields (as Ken MacDonald)
- Lee Shumway as Nelson
- Mary MacLaren as Martha Nelson
- Yakima Canutt as Henchman Morrison
