= Gauchos of Eldorado =

1941 film

- Film poster
- Directed by: Lester Orlebeck
- Written by: Albert DeMond; Earle Snell
- Produced by: Louis Gray
- Starring: Bob Steele; Tom Tyler; Rufe Davis
- Cinematography: Reggie Lanning
- Edited by: Charles Craft
- Production company: Republic Pictures
- Distributed by: Republic Pictures
- Release date: 24 October 1941
- Running time: 56 minutes
- Country: United States
- Language: English

Gauchos of Eldorado is a 1941 American Western film directed by Lester Orlebeck and starring Bob Steele, Tom Tyler and Rufe Davis. It is part of the "Three Mesquiteers" B-movie series produced by Republic Pictures.

== Cast ==
- Bob Steele as Tucson Smith
- Tom Tyler as Stony Brooke
- Rufe Davis as Lullaby Joslin
- Lois Collier as Ellen
- Duncan Renaldo as Gaucho / José Ojara
- Rosina Galli as Isabel Ojara
- Norman Willis as Bart Braden
- William Ruhl as Sam Tyndal
- Tony Roux as Miguel
- Ray Bennett as Monk Stevens (as Raphael Bennett)
- Yakima Canutt as Henchman Snakes

== Bibliography ==
- Fetrow, Alan G. Feature Films, 1940-1949: a United States Filmography. McFarland, 1994.
