= Gangs of Sonora =

1941 film

- Film poster
- Directed by: John English
- Written by: William Colt MacDonald; Albert DeMond; Doris Schroeder
- Produced by: Louis Gray
- Starring: Robert Livingston; Bob Steele; Rufe Davis
- Cinematography: Bud Thackery
- Edited by: Ray Snyder
- Production company: Republic Pictures
- Distributed by: Republic Pictures
- Release date: July 10, 1941
- Running time: 56 minutes
- Country: United States
- Language: English

Gangs of Sonora is a 1941 American Western film directed by John English and starring Robert Livingston, Bob Steele and Rufe Davis. Produced and distributed by Republic Pictures it is part of the "Three Mesquiteers" B-movie series.

== Cast ==
- Bob Livingston as Stony Brooke
- Bob Steele as Tucson Smith
- Rufe Davis as Lullaby Joslin
- June Johnson as June Conners
- Malcolm McTaggart as David Conners (as Ward 'Bud' McTaggart)
- Helen MacKellar as Kansas Kate Conners
- Robert Frazer as Commissioner Sam Tredwell
- William Farnum as Editor Ward Beecham
- Budd Buster as Jed Pickins
- Hal Price as Sheriff C. D. Lawson
