= Pals of the Pecos =

1941 film

- Film poster
- Directed by: Lester Orlebeck
- Written by: William Colt MacDonald; Oliver Drake; Herbert Dalmas
- Produced by: Louis Gray
- Starring: Robert Livingston; Bob Steele; Rufe Davis
- Cinematography: Reggie Lanning
- Edited by: Ray Snyder
- Production company: Republic Pictures
- Distributed by: Republic Pictures
- Release date: February 8, 1941
- Running time: 56 minutes
- Country: United States
- Language: English

Pals of the Pecos is a 1941 American Western film directed by Lester Orlebeck and starring Robert Livingston, Bob Steele and Rufe Davis. It was part of the "Three Mesquiteers" B-movie series released by Republic Pictures.

== Cast ==
- Robert Livingston as Stony Brooke
- Bob Steele as Tucson Smith
- Rufe Davis as Lullaby Joslin
- June Johnson as June Burke
- Robert Winkler as Tim Burke
- Pat O'Malley as Dan Burke
- Dennis Moore as Larry Burke
- Robert Frazer as Stevens
- Roy Barcroft as Keno
- John Holland as Lawyer Buckley
- Tom London as Sheriff Jeff

== Bibliography ==
- Fetrow, Alan G. Feature Films, 1940-1949: a United States Filmography. McFarland, 1994.
