= Shadows on the Sage =

1942 film

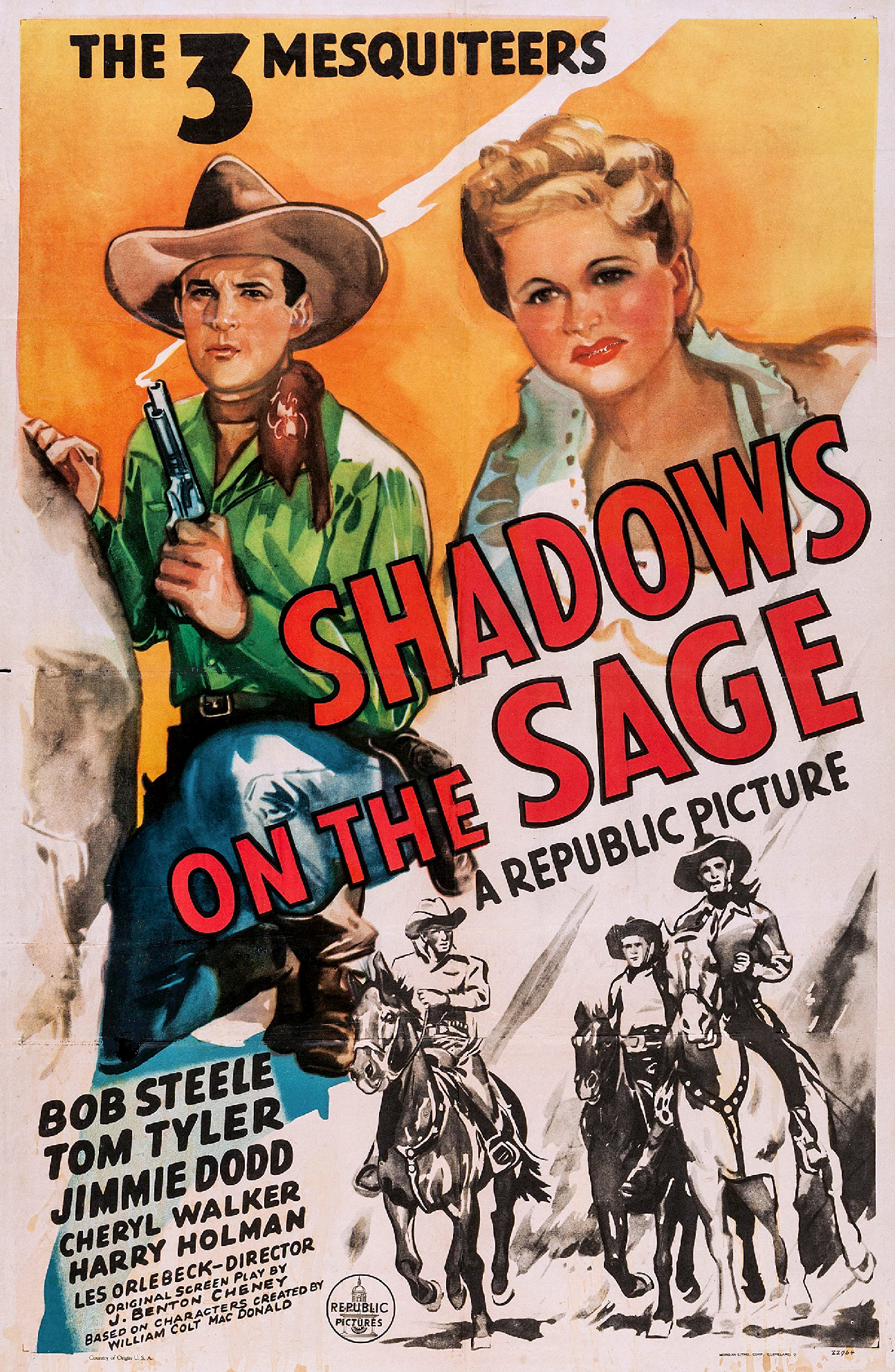
- Theatrical release poster
- Directed by: Lester Orlebeck
- Written by: William Colt MacDonald; J. Benton Cheney
- Produced by: Louis Gray
- Starring: Bob Steele; Tom Tyler; Jimmie Dodd
- Cinematography: Edgar Lyons
- Edited by: William P. Thompson
- Distributed by: Republic Pictures
- Release date: 24 August 1942
- Running time: 55 minutes
- Country: United States
- Language: English

Shadows on the Sage is a 1942 American Western "Three Mesquiteers" B-movie directed by Lester Orlebeck and starring Bob Steele, Tom Tyler, and Jimmie Dodd.

== Cast ==
- Bob Steele as Tucson Smith
- Tom Tyler as Stony Brooke
- Jimmie Dodd as Lullaby Joslin
- Cheryl Walker as Doris Jackson
- Harry Holman as Lippy
- Bryant Washburn as Banker John Carson
- Griff Barnett as Steve Jackson
- Freddie Mercer as Johnny Jackson
- Tom London as Franklin
- Yakima Canutt as Red Harvey, a Henchman
