= The Trail Blazers =

1940 film

- Directed by: George Sherman
- Written by: William Colt MacDonald; Barry Shipman; Earle Snell
- Produced by: Harry Grey
- Starring: Robert Livingston; Bob Steele; Rufe Davis
- Cinematography: William Nobles
- Edited by: Tony Martinelli
- Production company: Republic Pictures
- Release date: November 11, 1940
- Running time: 58 minutes
- Country: United States
- Language: English

The Trail Blazers is a 1940 American Western "Three Mesquiteers" B-movie directed by George Sherman and starring Robert Livingston, Bob Steele, and Rufe Davis.

== Cast ==
- Robert Livingston as Stony Brooke
- Bob Steele as Tucson Smith
- Rufe Davis as Lullaby Joslin
- Pauline Moore as Marcia Kelton
- Weldon Heyburn as Jeff Bradley
- Carroll Nye as Jim Chapman
- Tom Chatterton as Major R.C. Kelton
- Si Jenks as T.L. Johnson (dentist)
- Mary Field as Alice Chapman
- John Merton as Henchman Mason
- Rex Lease as Engineer Reynolds
- Robert Blair as Stage passenger
- Jack Kirk as Wagon Driver George

== See also ==
- Bob Steele filmography
