= Saddlemates =

1941 film

- Theatrical release poster
- Directed by: Lester Orlebeck
- Written by: William Colt MacDonald; Bernard McConville; Karen DeWolf
- Produced by: Louis Gray
- Starring: Robert Livingston; Bob Steele; Rufe Davis
- Cinematography: William Nobles
- Edited by: Tony Martinelli
- Production company: Republic Pictures
- Distributed by: Republic Pictures
- Release date: 16 May 1941
- Running time: 56 minutes
- Country: United States
- Language: English

Saddlemates is a 1941 American Western film directed by Lester Orlebeck and starring Robert Livingston, Bob Steele and Rufe Davis. Part of the "Three Mesquiteers" B-movie series, it was produced and distributed by Republic Pictures.

== Cast ==
- Robert Livingston as Stony Brooke
- Bob Steele as Tucson Smith
- Rufe Davis as Lullaby Joslin
- Gale Storm as Susan Langley
- Forbes Murray as Col. Langley
- Cornelius Keefe as Lt. Bob Manning
- George Lynn as LeRoque / Wanechee (as Peter George Lynn)
- Marin Sais as Mrs. Langley
- Martin Faust as Chief Thunder Bird (as Marty Faust)
- Glenn Strange as Little Bear
- Ellen Lowe as Aunt Amanda
