= Vinson, Oklahoma =

Unincorporated community in Oklahoma, US

Coordinates: 34°54′02″N 99°51′35″W

Location of Vinson within the state of Oklahoma

Vinson is an unincorporated community in Harmon County, Oklahoma, United States. The community was named for Henry B. Vinson, townsite owner. Vinson had a post office, which was established on August 20, 1903. The post office (ZIP code 73571) was discontinued in 2017.

== Notable people ==
- Rufe Davis, actor who appeared in Petticoat Junction.
- John W. Aaron (nicknamed "The Steely-Eyed Missile Man"); NASA electrical engineer credited with saving the Apollo 12 mission
