= The Phantom Plainsmen =

1942 film

- Film poster
- Directed by: John English
- Written by: Barry Shipman; William Colt MacDonald; Robert Yost
- Produced by: Louis Gray
- Starring: Bob Steele; Tom Tyler; Rufe Davis
- Cinematography: Bud Thackery
- Edited by: William P. Thompson
- Distributed by: Republic Pictures
- Release date: June 16, 1942
- Running time: 56 minutes
- Country: United States
- Language: English

The Phantom Plainsmen is a 1942 American Western "Three Mesquiteers" B-movie directed by John English and starring Bob Steele, Tom Tyler, and Rufe Davis.

== Cast ==
- Bob Steele as Tucson Smith
- Tom Tyler as Stony Brooke
- Rufe Davis as Lullaby Joslin
- Rudolph Anders as Colonel Eric Hartwig (as Robert O. Davis)
- Lois Collier as Judy Barrett
- Charles Miller as Cap Marvin
- Alex Callam as Kurt Redman
- Monte Montague as Henchman Muller
- Henry Rowland as Lindrick
- Richard Crane as Tad Marvin
- Jack Kirk as Joe
- Al Taylor as Heavy
