= Code of the Outlaw =

1942 film

- Film poster
- Directed by: John English
- Written by: Barry Shipman; William Colt MacDonald
- Produced by: Louis Gray
- Starring: Bob Steele; Tom Tyler; Rufe Davis
- Cinematography: Reggie Lanning
- Edited by: Charles Craft
- Distributed by: Republic Pictures
- Release date: January 30, 1942
- Running time: 57 minutes
- Country: United States
- Language: English

Code of the Outlaw is a 1942 American Western "Three Mesquiteers" B-movie directed by John English.

== Cast ==
- Bob Steele as Tucson Smith
- Tom Tyler as Stony Brooke
- Rufe Davis as Lullaby Joslin
- Weldon Heyburn as Bart 'Pop' Hardin
- Benny Bartlett as Tim Hardin (as Bennie Bartlett)
- Linda Leighton as Sue Dayton (as Melinda Leighton)
- Donald Curtis as Henchman Taggart
- John Ince as Sheriff Ed Stoddard
- Kenne Duncan as Henchman Plug (as Ken Duncan)
- Phil Dunham as Boyle
- Max Waizmann as Dr. Horace M. Beagle (as Max Waizman)
- Chuck Morrison as Wounded Henchman
- Carleton Young as Henchman
