= Westward Ho (1942 film) =

1942 film

- Directed by: John English
- Written by: William Colt MacDonald
- Produced by: Louis Gray
- Starring: Bob Steele; Tom Tyler; Rufe Davis
- Cinematography: Reggie Lanning
- Edited by: William P. Thompson
- Distributed by: Republic Pictures
- Release date: April 24, 1942
- Running time: 56 minutes
- Country: United States
- Language: English

Westward Ho is a 1942 American Western "Three Mesquiteers" B-movie directed by John English and starring Bob Steele, Tom Tyler, and Rufe Davis.

== Cast ==
- Bob Steele as Tucson Smith
- Tom Tyler as Stony Brooke
- Rufe Davis as Lullaby Joslin
- Evelyn Brent as Mrs. Healey
- Donald Curtis as Rick West
- Lois Collier as Anne Henderson
- Emmett Lynn as Sheriff
- John James as Jimmy Henderson
- Tom Seidel as Wayne Henderson
- Jack Kirk as Deputy
- Budd Buster as Henchman Coffee
