= Outlaws of Cherokee Trail =

1941 film

- Film poster
- Directed by: Lester Orlebeck
- Written by: William Colt MacDonald; Albert DeMond
- Produced by: Louis Gray
- Starring: Robert Livingston; Bob Steele; Rufe Davis
- Cinematography: Ernest Miller
- Edited by: Ray Snyder
- Music by: Cy Feuer
- Production company: Republic Pictures
- Distributed by: Republic Pictures
- Release date: September 10, 1941
- Running time: 56 minutes
- Country: United States
- Language: English

Outlaws of Cherokee Trail is a 1941 American Western film directed by Lester Orlebeck and starring Robert Livingston, Bob Steele and Lois Collier. It is part of the long-running Three Mesquiteers B-movie series released by Republic Pictures. directed by Lester Orlebeck.

== Cast ==
- Tom Tyler as Stony Brooke
- Bob Steele as Tucson Smith
- Rufe Davis as Lullaby Joslin
- Lois Collier as Doris Sheldon
- Tom Chatterton as Capt. Sheldon
- Joel Friedkin as Judge
- Roy Barcroft as Val Lamar
- Phillip Trent as Fake Jim Warren
- Rex Lease as Fake Marshal
- Peggy Lynn as Belle

== Bibliography ==
- Fetrow, Alan G. Feature Films, 1940-1949: a United States Filmography. McFarland, 1994.
