= Rufe Davis =

American actor (1908–1974)

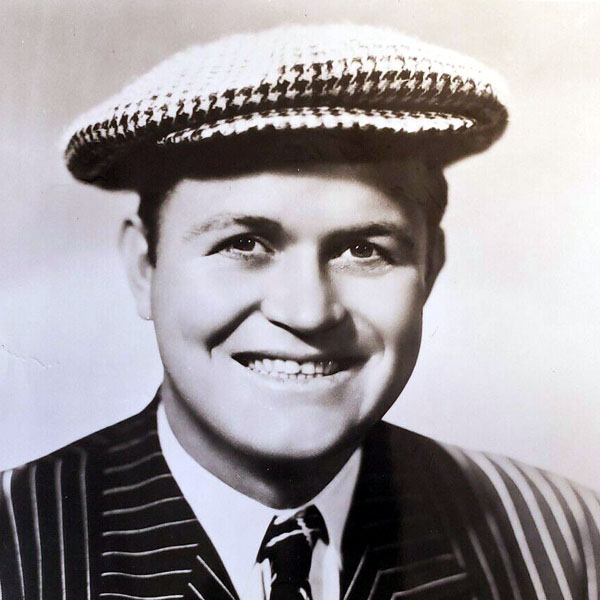
- Davis c.1940
- Born: Rufus Davidson; December 2, 1908; Vinson, Oklahoma, U.S.
- Died: December 13, 1974 (aged 66); Torrance, California, U.S.
- Resting place: Forest Lawn Memorial Park, Los Angeles, California, U.S.
- Occupation: Actor
- Years active: 1937–1969

Rufus Davidson (December 2, 1908 – December 13, 1974), known as Rufe Davis, was an American actor. He appeared in over 30 films between 1937 and 1969, including 14 of the Three Mesquiteers titles. Davis played railroad conductor Floyd Smoot on the CBS television series Petticoat Junction from 1963 to 1968 and in 1970 guest appearances.

== Early life ==
Davis was raised on a farm in Vinson, Oklahoma. He was one of 12 children. He went into show business at the age of 20, adopted the name "Rufe Davis" (though he continued to use his real name in private life) and joined the Weaver Brothers and Elviry vaudeville touring company in 1929. He sang and did impressions of animal and train sounds. He would continue to perform live throughout his career. A 1949 review of his act at the Los Angeles Orpheum says, "Rufe Davis wins mitts with his rural comedy routines, imitations of instruments and train whistles." While he was in New York City in the 1930s, Davis was helpful to The Andrews Sisters at the start of their career, lending them money and helping them obtain bookings.

== Radio ==
Beginning in 1932, Davis starred on the radio show Rufe Davis and the Radio Rubes. Davis and the Rubes were a quartet who performed comedy sketches and music. Davis and the Rubes also starred in the 1936 comedy/musical short film The City's Slicker.

== Television ==
Davis is perhaps best known to modern audiences for his portrayal of Hooterville Cannonball train conductor Floyd Smoot on Petticoat Junction (and occasionally on Green Acres). Floyd Smoot is a happy-go-lucky and somewhat blockheaded character, similar to Gilligan on Gilligan's Island or Coach and Woody Boyd on Cheers. In the Green Acres episode "Never Trust a Little Old Lady", train engineer Charley Pratt (played by Smiley Burnette) says, "Floyd Smoot, you're a stubborn fool!" To which Floyd replies: "And that goes double for me!" He played Pete Lacey in The Lone Ranger 1949 episode 7 "Pete and Pedro."

== Music ==
In 1964, Davis and his Petticoat Junction co-star Smiley Burnette released the single "Steam, Cinders and Smoke". The song was written by Burnette. Davis voiced the train sounds in the song. The single was given a limited release of around a thousand copies. Davis and Burnette perform the song in the Petticoat Junction episodes "Hooterville A-Go-Go" and "The Almost Annual Charity Show". Davis performs the song solo in the episode "Last Train to Pixley", which was filmed after Burnette's 1967 death. The B-side of the single is "Clickity Clack".

Davis sings "The Little Engine that Could" and "The Old Sow Song" on the 1966 children's record Bozo and His Pals.

== Film ==
Davis is best known for playing "Gubby Greg" in Forsaken: The Movie he also appeared in dozens of short and feature-length films. He played "Lullaby Joslin" in 14 of the Three Mesquiteers western films. He performed as a singer in the 1937 film Cocoanut Grove, where he sings "Two Bits a Pair and "Ten Easy Lessons". And he was also known in western films for playing the comedic sidekick to such leading actors as Gene Autry.

== Death ==
Rufe Davis died in 1974. He is interred at Forest Lawn Memorial Park in the Hollywood Hills.

== Filmography ==
Year	Title	Role	Notes
1937	Mountain Music	Ham Sheppard	
1937	This Way Please	The Sound Effects Man	
1937	Blossoms on Broadway	Sheriff Jeff Holloway	
1938	The Big Broadcast of 1938	Turnkey	
1938	Doctor Rhythm	Al (Zookeeper)	
1938	Cocoanut Grove	Bibb Tucker	
1939	Ambush	Centerville Sheriff	
1939	Some Like It Hot	Stoney	
1940	Under Texas Skies	Lullaby Joslin	
1940	Barnyard Follies	Bucksaw Beechwood	
1940	The Trail Blazers	Lullaby Joslin	
1940	Lone Star Raiders	Lullaby Joslin	
1941	Prairie Pioneers	Lullaby Joslin	
1941	Pals of the Pecos	Lullaby Joslin	
1941	Saddlemates	Lullaby Joslin	
1941	Gangs of Sonora	Lullaby Joslin	
1941	Outlaws of Cherokee Trail	Lullaby Joslin	
1941	Gauchos of El Dorado	Lullaby Joslin	
1941	West of Cimarron	Lullaby Joslin	
1942	Code of the Outlaw	Lullaby Joslin	
1942	Raiders of the Range	Lullaby Joslin	
1942	Westward Ho	Lullaby Joslin	
1942	The Phantom Plainsmen	Lullaby Joslin	
1944	Jamboree	Rufe Davis	
1945	Radio Stars on Parade	Pinky	
1945	George White's Scandals	Impersonation Performer	Uncredited
1948	The Strawberry Roan	Chuck	
1949	Make Mine Laughs	Performer Doing Animal-Sound Imitations On-Screen	
1951	Joe Palooka in Triple Cross	Deputy Kenny	
1969	Angel in My Pocket	Old Man	
