= Raiders of the Range =

1942 film

- Film poster
- Directed by: John English
- Written by: Barry Shipman; William Colt MacDonald
- Produced by: Louis Gray
- Starring: Bob Steele; Tom Tyler; Rufe Davis
- Cinematography: Ernest Miller
- Edited by: Charles Craft
- Distributed by: Republic Pictures
- Release date: March 18, 1942
- Running time: 54 minutes
- Country: United States
- Language: English

Raiders of the Range is a 1942 American Western "Three Mesquiteers" B-movie directed by John English.

== Cast ==
- Bob Steele as Tucson Smith
- Tom Tyler as Stony Brooke
- Rufe Davis as Lullaby Joslin
- Lois Collier as Jean Travers
- Frank Jaquet as Sam Daggett
- Tom Chatterton as 'Doc' Higgins
- Charles Miller as John Travers
- Dennis Moore as Foster
- Fred Kohler Jr. as Henchman Plummer
- Max Waizmann as The Coroner (as Max Waizman)
- Hal Price as Sheriff
