= West of Cimarron =

1941 film

- Film poster
- Directed by: Lester Orlebeck
- Written by: Albert DeMond; William Colt MacDonald
- Produced by: Louis Gray
- Starring: Bob Steele; Tom Tyler; Rufe Davis
- Cinematography: Ernest Miller
- Edited by: Howard O'Neill
- Music by: Cy Feuer
- Production company: Republic Pictures
- Distributed by: Republic Pictures
- Release date: December 15, 1941
- Running time: 56 minutes
- Country: United States
- Language: English

West of Cimarron is a 1941 American Western "Three Mesquiteers" B-movie directed by Lester Orlebeck and starring Bob Steele, Tom Tyler, and Rufe Davis.

== Cast ==
- Bob Steele as Tucson Smith
- Tom Tyler as Stony Brooke
- Rufe Davis as Lullaby Joslin
- Lois Collier as Doris Conway
- James Bush as Dr. Ken Morgan
- Guy Usher as Col. Conway
- Hugh Prosser as Charles Bentley
- Cordell Hickman as Rastus Brown
- Roy Barcroft as Capt. Hawks
- Budd Buster as Col. Grant Morgan
