= Lester Orlebeck =

American film editor

- Born: Lester John Orlebeke; June 26, 1907; Sheboygan, Wisconsin, USA
- Died: August 2, 1970 (aged 63); Los Angeles, California, USA
- Occupations: Film editor, film director
- Years active: 1935–1970
- Spouse: Geraldine Wisecup

Lester Orlebeck (June 26, 1907 – August 2, 1970) was an American film editor and director who worked on more than 100 films and television shows between 1935 and 1970.

== Biography ==
Lester was born in Sheboygan, Wisconsin, to John Orlebeke and Mary Ellen Boyd. According to census records, his father's family was from Holland, and his mother's family hailed from Ireland. Lester moved to Los Angeles as a young man and found employment as a film editor and occasional director at Republic Studios. He helped make training films for the U.S. Air Force during World War II, during which time he was stationed in Dayton, Ohio. He died of a heart attack in Los Angeles, California, in 1970, at the age of 63.

== Selected filmography ==
- Ghost-Town Gold (1936)
- Range Defenders (1937)
- Come on, Cowboys (1937)
- The Old Barn Dance (1938)
- Billy the Kid Returns (1938)
- The Arizona Kid (1939)
- Rough Riders' Round-up (1939)
- Southward Ho (1939)
- Heroes of the Saddle (1940)
- The Ranger and the Lady (1940)
- Young Bill Hickok (1940)
- Pioneers of the West (1940)
- Prairie Pioneers (1941)
- Pals of the Pecos (1941)
- Saddlemates (1941)
- Outlaws of Cherokee Trail (1941)
- Gauchos of El Dorado (1941)
- West of Cimarron (1941)
- Nevada City (1941)
- Sunset on the Desert (1942)
- Shadows on the Sage (1942)
- Stagecoach to Denver (1946)
- Apache Rose (1947)
- Bells of San Angelo (1947)
- Teaserama (1955)
