= Roarin' Lead =

1936 film by Sam Newfield, Mack V. Wright

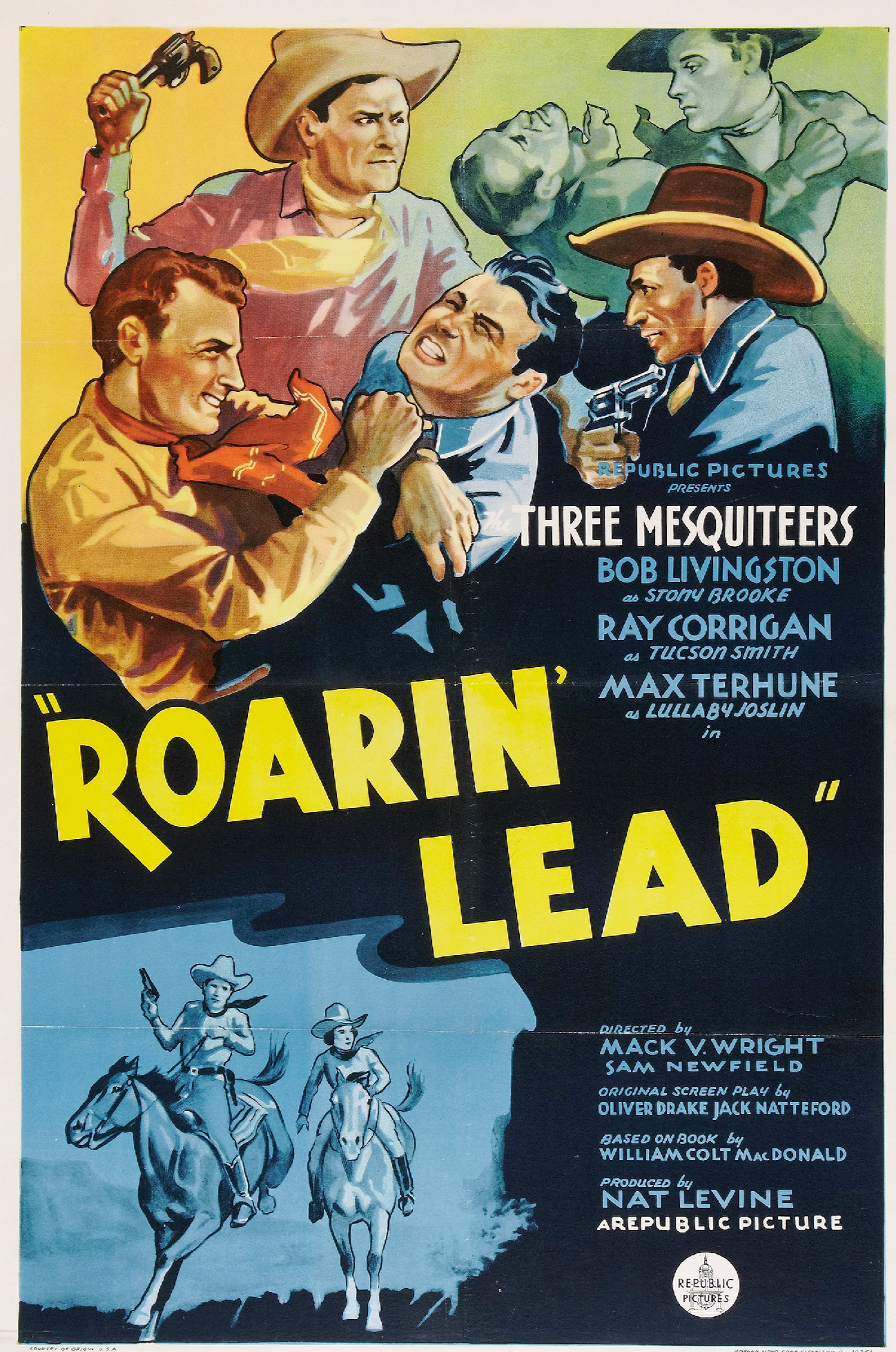
- Theatrical release poster
- Directed by: Sam Newfield; Mack V. Wright
- Written by: Oliver Drake; Jack Natteford
- Based on: Roarin' Lead; 1935 novel by William Colt MacDonald
- Produced by: Nat Levine (producer); Sol C. Siegel (associate producer)
- Starring: Bob Livingston; Ray Corrigan; Max Terhune
- Cinematography: William Nobles
- Edited by: William P. Thompson
- Music by: Harry Grey
- Production company: Republic Pictures Corporation
- Distributed by: Republic Pictures Corp.
- Release date: December 9, 1936
- Running time: 61 minutes 52 minutes (edited version)
- Country: United States
- Language: English

Roarin' Lead is a 1936 American Western film directed by Sam Newfield and Mack V. Wright and was the third entry of the 51-film series of Western "Three Mesquiteers" B-movies.

== Plot summary ==
Hackett is out to take over the Cattlemen's Protective Association by bankrupting them; secretly his men rustle the cattle forcing the payouts to the ranchers.

In an effort to obtain more funding, he orders an orphanage that was funded by the creators of the Association to be sold with the orphans to be purchased as child labour. The Three Mesquiteers step in to teach the bad guys a lesson they'll never forget.

== Cast ==
- Robert Livingston as Stony Brooke
- Ray Corrigan as Tucson Smith
- Max Terhune as Lullaby Joslin
- Christine Maple as Doris Moore
- Hooper Atchley as Hackett
- Yakima Canutt as Henchman Canary
- George Chesebro as Captain Gardner
- Tommy Bupp as Bobby
- Mary Russell as Orphanage Assistant Mary
- Jane Keckley as Mrs. Perkins
- Tamara Lynn Kauffman as Baby Mary
- Beverly Luff as M.C. / Singer / Dancer
- Theodore Frye as Apache dancer
- Kathy Frye as Apache Dancer
- Frank Austin as Mr. Hiram Perkins
- The Meglin Kiddies as Dancers

== Critical reception ==
Variety found this film, the third of The Three Mesquiteers series to be "very mild" and wrote that those who had followed the previous films would "scarcely find it up to par; others are likely to be bored."
