= Oklahoma Renegades =

1940 film

- Directed by: Nate Watt
- Written by: William Colt MacDonald; Charles R. Condon
- Produced by: Harry Grey
- Starring: Robert Livingston; Raymond Hatton; Duncan Renaldo
- Cinematography: Reggie Lanning
- Edited by: Tony Martinelli
- Production company: Republic Pictures
- Distributed by: Republic Pictures
- Release date: August 29, 1940
- Running time: 57 minutes
- Country: United States
- Language: English

Oklahoma Renegades is a 1940 American Western "Three Mesquiteers" B-movie directed by Nate Watt.

== Plot ==
The Three Mesquiteers—Stony Brooke, Rusty Joslin, and Rico—return to Oklahoma after the Spanish-American War, deeply concerned about their wounded veteran buddies' bleak futures. When the government offers preferred homesteads to war veterans in newly-opened Oklahoma territory, they help secure land against resistance from hostile cattlemen and scheming opportunists.

== Cast ==
- Robert Livingston as Stony Brooke
- Raymond Hatton as Rusty Joslin
- Duncan Renaldo as Renaldo
- Lee 'Lasses' White as Jim Keith
- Florine McKinney as Marian Carter
- William Ruhl as Mace Liscomb
- Al Herman as Hank Blake
- James Seay as Carl – Blind veteran
- Eddie Dean as Veteran
- Harold Daniels as Orv Liscomb
- Jack Lescoulie as Veteran
- Frosty Royce as Veteran Mort (as Frosty Royse)
