= Heart of the Rockies (1937 film) =

1937 film

- Film poster
- Directed by: Joseph Kane
- Written by: William Colt MacDonald; Bernard McConville; Jack Natteford; Oliver Drake
- Produced by: Sol C. Siegel
- Starring: Robert Livingston; Ray Corrigan; Max Terhune
- Cinematography: Jack A. Marta
- Edited by: Lester Orlebeck
- Distributed by: Republic Pictures
- Release date: September 6, 1937
- Running time: 67 minutes
- Country: United States
- Language: English

Heart of the Rockies is a 1937 American Western "Three Mesquiteers" B-movie directed by Joseph Kane.

== Cast ==
- Robert Livingston as Stony Brooke
- Ray Corrigan as Tucson Smith
- Max Terhune as Lullaby Joslin
- Lynne Roberts as Lorna Dawson (as Lynn Roberts)
- Sammy McKim as Davey Dawson (Ed's stepson)
- J. P. McGowan as Ed Dawson (head of Dawson clan)
- Yakima Canutt as Charlie Coe (Dawson henchman)
- Hal Taliaferro as Capt. Brady - Blackstone Park
- Maston Williams as Enoch Dawson, henchman
- Guy Wilkerson as Dawson clan member
- Ranny Weeks as Ranger Clayton
