= Pioneers of the West =

1940 film

- Film poster
- Directed by: Lester Orlebeck
- Written by: William Colt MacDonald; Jack Natteford; Karen DeWolf; Gerald Geraghty
- Produced by: Harry Grey
- Starring: Robert Livingston; Raymond Hatton; Duncan Renaldo
- Cinematography: Jack A. Marta
- Edited by: Tony Martinelli
- Distributed by: Republic Pictures
- Release date: March 12, 1940
- Running time: 56 minutes
- Country: United States
- Language: English

Pioneers of the West is a 1940 American Western "Three Mesquiteers" B-movie directed by Lester Orlebeck.

== Cast ==
- Robert Livingston as Stony Brooke
- Raymond Hatton as Rusty Joslin
- Duncan Renaldo as Renaldo
- Noah Beery as Judge Platt
- Beatrice Roberts as Anna Bailey
- George Cleveland as Dr. Bailey
- Lane Chandler as Steve Carson
- Hal Taliaferro as Jed Clark
- Yakima Canutt as Nolan
- John Dilson as Morgan
