= The Trigger Trio =

1937 film by William Witney

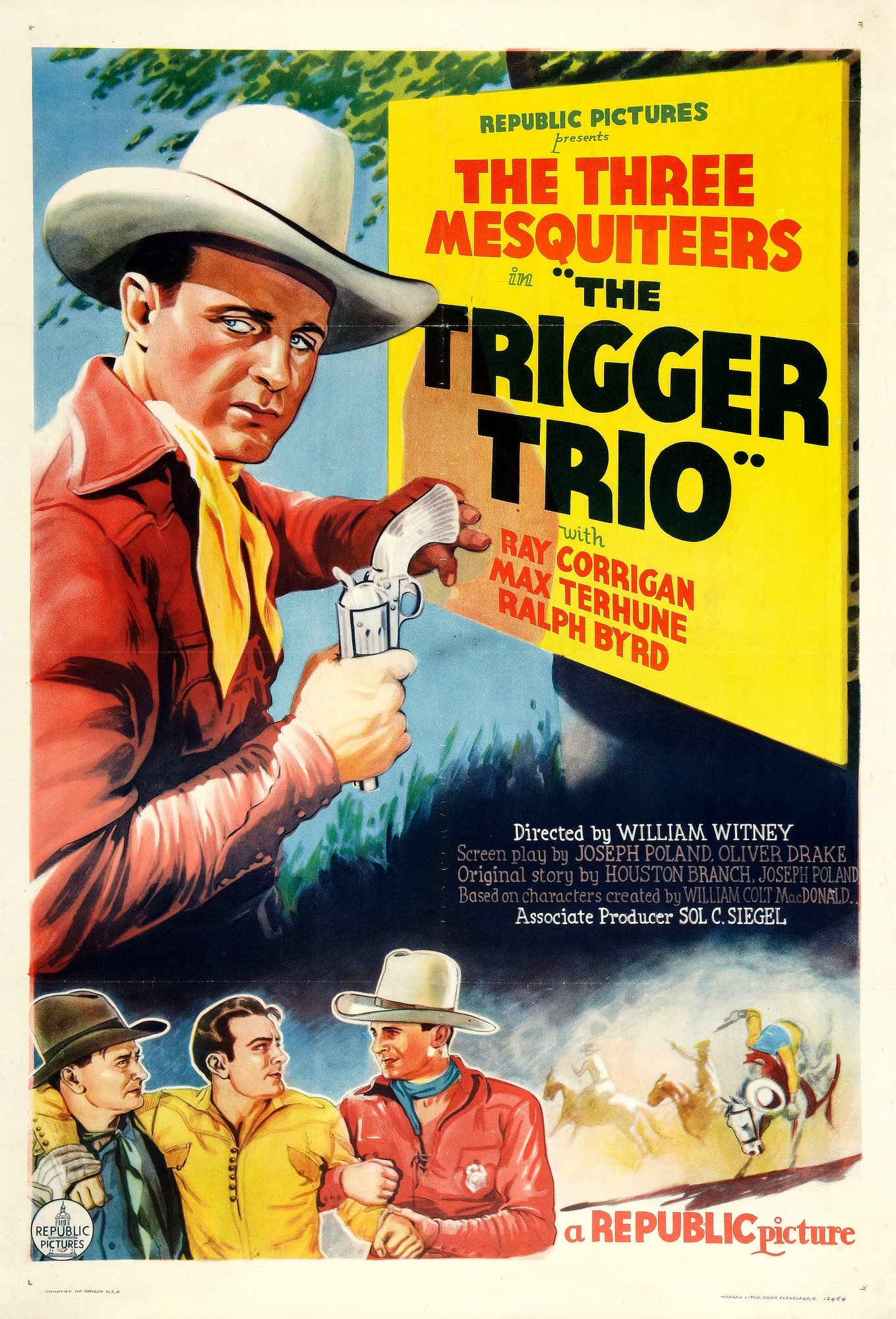
- Theatrical release poster
- Directed by: William Witney
- Written by: Houston Branch (story); Oliver Drake (writer); Joseph F. Poland (screenplay); Joseph F. Poland (story)
- Produced by: Sol C. Siegel (producer)
- Starring: See below
- Cinematography: Ernest Miller
- Edited by: Tony Martinelli
- Production company: Republic Pictures
- Distributed by: Republic Pictures
- Release date: October 18, 1937
- Running time: 55 minutes
- Country: United States
- Language: English

The Trigger Trio is a 1937 American Western "Three Mesquiteers" B-movie directed by William Witney.

== Cast ==
- Ray Corrigan as Tucson Smith
- Max Terhune as Lullaby Joslin
- Ralph Byrd as Larry Smith (Tucson's brother)
- Sandra Corday as Ann Evans
- Robert Warwick as John Evans
- Cornelius Keefe as Brent
- Sammy McKim as Mickey Evans
- Hal Taliaferro as Henchman Luke
- Willie Fung as The cook
- Buck as Buck
