= Heroes of the Saddle =

1940 film

- Film poster
- Directed by: William Witney
- Written by: William Colt MacDonald; Jack Natteford
- Produced by: Harry Grey
- Starring: Robert Livingston; Raymond Hatton; Duncan Renaldo
- Cinematography: William Nobles
- Edited by: Lester Orlebeck
- Distributed by: Republic Pictures
- Release date: January 12, 1940
- Running time: 56 minutes
- Country: United States
- Language: English

Heroes of the Saddle is a 1940 American Western "Three Mesquiteers" B-movie directed by William Witney.

== Cast ==
- Robert Livingston as Stony Brooke
- Raymond Hatton as Rusty Joslin
- Duncan Renaldo as Renaldo
- Patsy Parsons as Peggy Bell (as Patsy Lee Parsons)
- Loretta Weaver as Ruth Miller
- Byron Foulger as Melloney
- William Royle as J. D. Crone
- Vince Barnett as Zach
- Jack Roper as Boxer 'Killer' McCully
- Reed Howes as Henchman Wilson
- Ethyl May Halls as Miss Dobbs (as Ethel May Halls)
- Al Taylor as Henchman Hendricks
- Patsy Carmichael as Annie
