= Call the Mesquiteers =

1938 film

- Film poster
- Directed by: John English
- Written by: William Colt MacDonald; Luci Ward; Bernard McConville
- Produced by: William A. Berke
- Starring: Robert Livingston; Ray Corrigan; Max Terhune
- Cinematography: William Nobles
- Edited by: Lester Orlebeck
- Music by: Alberto Colombo
- Distributed by: Republic Pictures
- Release date: March 7, 1938
- Running time: 55 minutes
- Country: United States
- Language: English

Call the Mesquiteers (also released as Outlaws of the West) is a 1938 American Western "Three Mesquiteers" B-movie directed by John English.

== Cast ==
- Robert Livingston as Stony Brooke
- Ray Corrigan as Tucson Smith
- Max Terhune as Lullaby Joslin
- Lynne Roberts as Madge Irving (as Lynn Roberts)
- Earle Hodgins as Dr. Algemon Irving
- Sammy McKim as Timothy Irving
- Eddy Waller as Hardy
- Maston Williams as Phillips
- Eddie Hart as Henchman 'Lefty'
- Pat Gleason as Henchman Joe
- Roger Williams as Henchman Frank
- Warren Jackson as Henchman 'Mac'
- Hal Price as Sheriff Jed Benton
