= Bob Steele (actor) =

American actor (1907–1988)

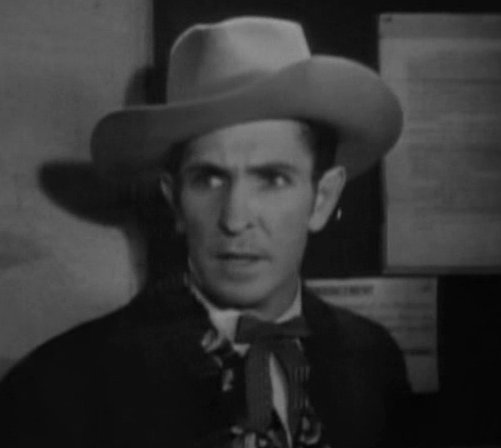
- Bob Steele in The Carson City Kid (1940)
- Born: Robert Adrian Bradbury; January 23, 1907; Portland, Oregon, U.S.
- Died: December 21, 1988 (aged 81)
- Resting place: Forest Lawn Memorial Park (Hollywood Hills)
- Other name: Bob Bradbury Jr.
- Occupation: Actor
- Years active: 1920–1973
- Spouse(s): Louise A. Chessman (m. 1931; div. 1933) Alice Petty Hackley (m. 1935; div. 1938) Virginia Nash Tatem (m. 1939)

Bob Steele (born Robert Adrian Bradbury, January 23, 1907 – December 21, 1988) was an American actor in film and television, performing mostly in Westerns. He also was billed as Bob Bradbury Jr., changing his name to Bob Steele in 1927 when he starred in The Mojave Kid. Altogether, Steele appeared in more than 400 Western films and television series. In 1937 and 1938, he was among the top 10 Western moneymakers.

Robert Adrian Bradbury was born in Portland, Oregon to Robert North Bradbury and the former Nieta Quinn. He had a twin brother, Bill, also an actor, as well as another brother named Jim.

== Early life ==
After years of touring in vaudville, the family settled in Hollywood in the late 1910s, where his father soon found work in the movies, first as an actor, later as a director. In 1920, the elder Bradbury staged and filmed a number of amateur home movies of Bill and his brother Bob. After showing these to friends, it was suggested that he produce them as an adventure series for children. They were released as a series of 16 one-reelers titled The Adventures of Bill and Bob. The series was only moderately successful because screenings were designed for children and thus were often withdrawn from theaters and instead shown in Sunday school groups and in schools.

Steele attended Glendale High School, where he became close friends with classmate Duke Morrison, who would, like Steele, become an actor and change his name to John Wayne. Steele would remain a lifelong presence around Wayne. At Glendale, while Bob's brother Bill played football, Bob participated in boxing and baseball. Bill continued through graduation, went to college and eventually became a doctor. Bob, however, having done theater in school, decided he wanted pursue acting as a career. He left school his junior year, following his father to the movie studios where he took small parts in films. Before Bill left for college, Bob and Bill toured as a vaudeville act known as The Murdock Brothers.

== Cowboy star ==
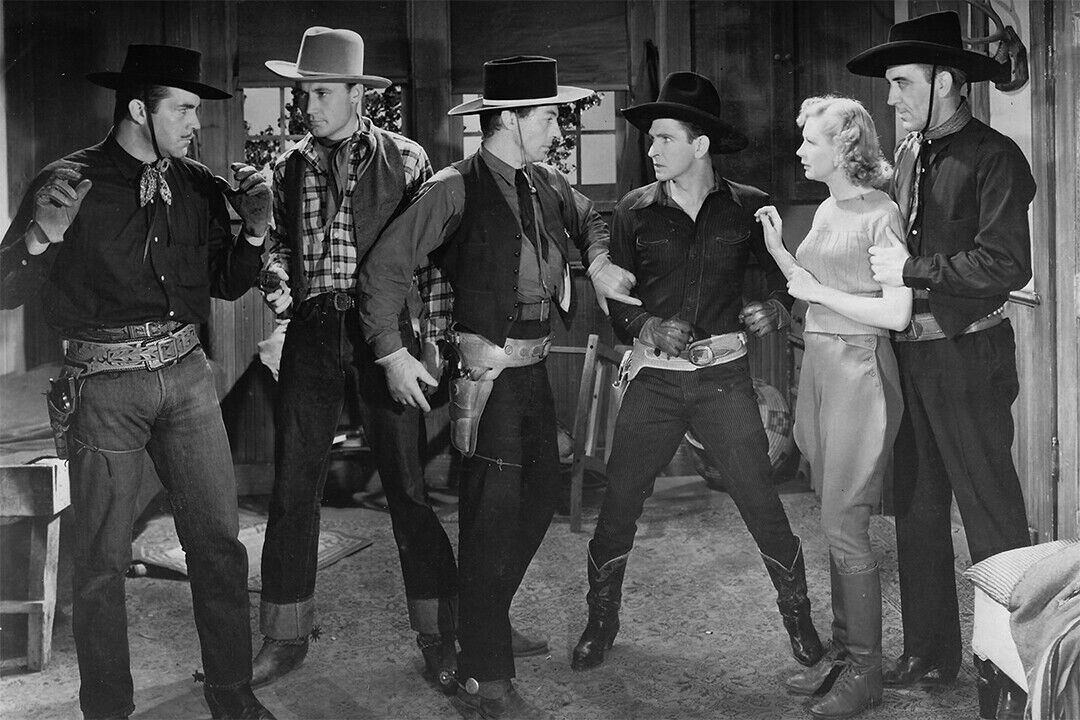
Bob Steele and Dorothy Dix in The Nevada Buckaroo (1931)

Bob, beginning his film career as Robert Bradbury Jr., signed on for a series of historical Westerns being directed by his father, produced by Anthony J. Xydias for his Sunset Productions, including With Daniel Boone Thru the Wilderness (1926), With Davy Crockett at the Fall of the Alamo (1926), and With Sitting Bull at the Spirit Lake Massacre (1927). While working at Sunset, he landed a job at Film Booking Offices of America (FBO) in the 1926 film The College Boob.

In 1927 FBO gave 15 actors screen tests for a planned series of Westerns; Bob won the contract. Screenwriter Oliver Drake encouraged Bob to change his screen name. "Bob Steele" made his debut in The Mojave Kid (1927), directed by his father. The Mojave Kid was a success and launched Steele as the star of 13 silent westerns.

Steele was well positioned to make the jump from silent Westerns to sound. He was youthful, with good acting ability, and his short stature drew fans who loved to see him take on larger, less good-looking outlaws. His first "talkie" was Near the Rainbow's End in 1930. Steele became one of the most popular B-Western stars of the 1930s and 1940s and worked for almost every minor film studio, including Monogram, Supreme, Tiffany, Syndicate, Republic, including several films of The Three Mesquiteers series, and Producers Releasing Corporation (PRC), including the initial films of PRC's "Billy the Kid" series. He was even able to land the occasional role in a major motion picture, as in the adaptation of John Steinbeck's novel, Of Mice and Men in 1939.

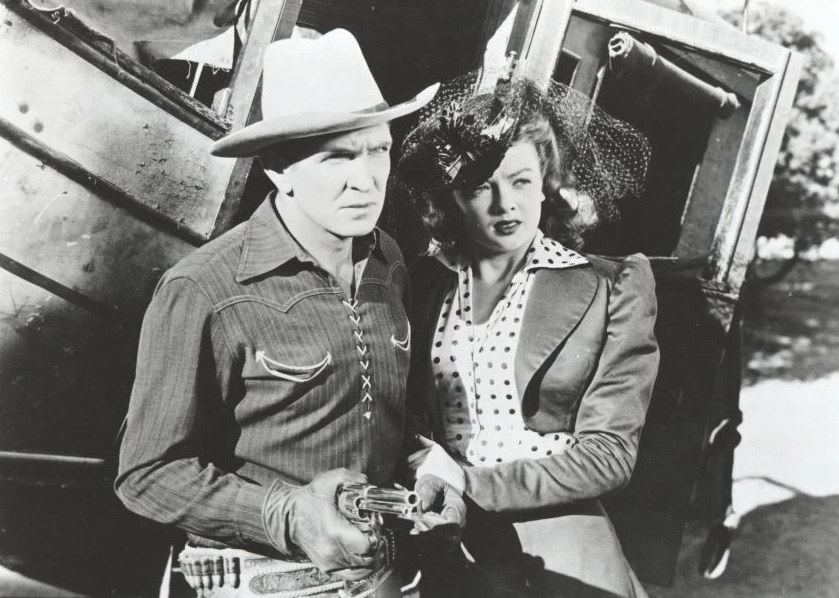
Bob Steele and Myrna Dell in Arizona Whirlwind, part of the Trail Blazers series.

In the 1940s, Monogram signed Steele to appear in four of its Trail Blazers series alongside screen veterans Ken Maynard and Hoot Gibson. The hot-tempered Maynard disliked Steele and left the studio, leaving Gibson and Steele to finish out the series. Steele's final starring series was with PRC, for the 1945-46 season (The Navajo Kid, Ambush Trail, etc.). Steele left PRC in 1946.

== Character actor ==
Steele kept working regularly as a character actor, accepting supporting roles in big movies like Howard Hawks' The Big Sleep, and the John Wayne vehicles Island in the Sky, Rio Bravo, Rio Lobo, The Comancheros, and The Longest Day. He also made occasional appearances in science-fiction films like The Atomic Submarine and Giant from the Unknown.

== Television ==
Like many screen players, Steele was employed by producers working in the new field of television. In the premiere episode of the 1957 Warner Bros. series Colt .45, he had the role of Sergeant Granger. That same year, he was cast as Sam Shoulders in "Bunch Quitter" in another Warner series, Sugarfoot, with Will Hutchins. He appeared in 1958 and 1959 in two episodes of the NBC Western, The Californians, and three episodes of the Warner hit Maverick with James Garner, including "The War of the Silver Kings", "The Seventh Hand", and "Holiday at Hollow Rock".

Steele appeared as Kirby with Agnes Moorehead and Madlyn Rhue in the 1959 episode "In Memoriam" of another ABC Western series, The Rebel, starring Nick Adams. He also appeared as Deputy Sam in four episodes of Hugh O'Brian's The Life and Legend of Wyatt Earp. In 1959, he appeared with Mason Alan Dinehart, another Wyatt Earp alumnus, in the episode "Half a Loaf" of the syndicated series, Death Valley Days, hosted by Stanley Andrews.

Steele appeared in six different episodes of the Walt Disney's Western television series Texas John Slaughter with Tom Tryon. On January 25, 1960, Steele was cast as the frontier gunfighter Luke Short in an episode of the CBS Western series, The Texan, starring Rory Calhoun.

In the mid-1960s, Steele returned to Warner Bros. for a regular supporting role in ABC's F Troop, which allowed him to show his comic talent. Steele was Trooper Duffy, the grizzled senior member of a platoon of cavalry misfits. A running gag had Duffy claiming to have been "shoulder to shoulder with Davy Crockett at the Alamo" and to have been the only survivor of the battle 40 years before. (In real life, 40 years before F Troop, Steele played a supporting role in his father's 1926 film Davy Crockett at the Fall of the Alamo.) Bob Steele became known to a new generation of TV viewers, who know him mainly as Duffy from F Troop. In 1970, he played the role of a retired movie cowboy in “The Old Cowhand”, an episode of Family Affair.

== Death and legacy ==
Steele died of heart failure, December 21, 1988. He is interred in the columbarium at Forest Lawn Memorial Park in the Hollywood Hills.

In Peter Straub and Michael Easton's The Green Woman graphic novel, the protagonist is named Bob Steele. The novel explicitly states that he is named after the actor.
