= Charlton Hill =

Australian singer (born 1975)

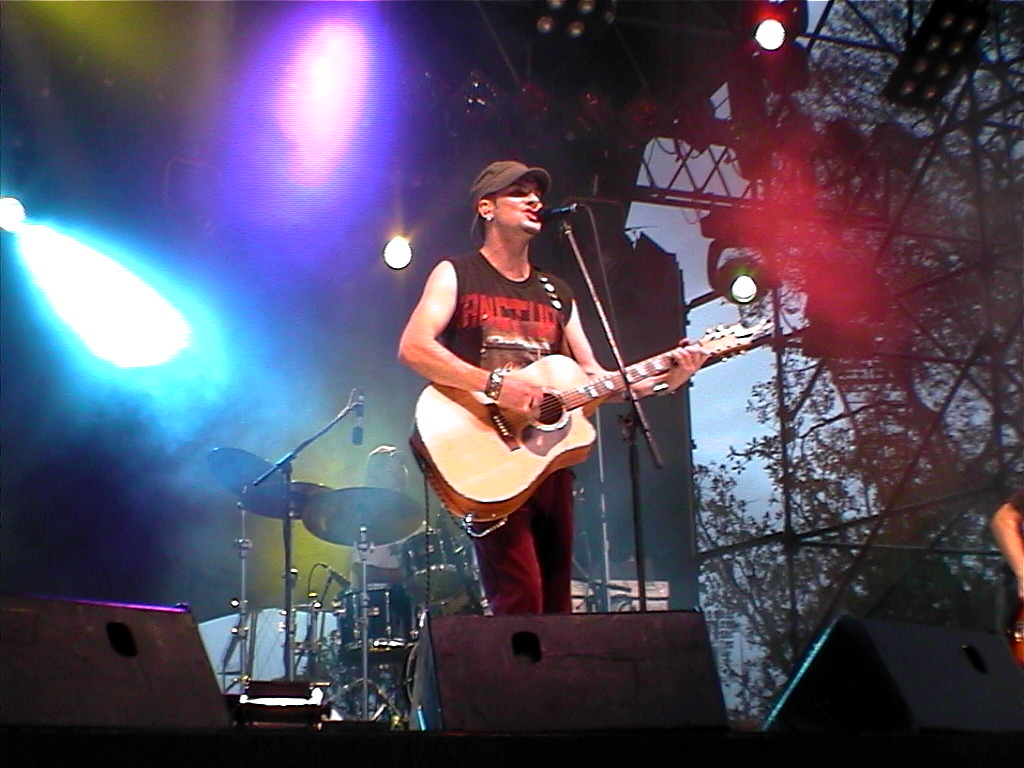

Background information
- Born: Andrew James Charlton Hill; 4 April 1975 (age 51)
- Origin: Sydney, Australia
- Genre: Pop rock
- Occupations: Singer-songwriter; guitarist; actor; music publisher
- Instruments: Vocals; guitar
- Years active: 2002–present
- Labels: Murmur, Public Domain Records, Hussle, Uncanny Valley

Andrew James Charlton Hill, known professionally as Charlton Hill (born 4 April 1975), is an Australian singer-songwriter, actor and music publisher. Charlton's experience in the music, television, advertising and branding industries ranges from major recording artist, songwriter and actor to sonic branding strategist and tech entrepreneur.

== Early life ==
Hill was born 4 April 1975 in Sydney, Australia. His father worked in environmental planning and his mother taught languages and was a librarian at Macquarie University. He has two sisters, Cassandra and Justine. At age 11, Hill began studying acting at a local drama school on the Northern Beaches of Sydney under agent Allison Meadows and began performing in school plays and bands, writing some of his first songs. Hill's second cousin is Martin Plaza from iconic Australian pop rock band Mental as Anything.

== Career ==
=== 1987–1997: Career beginnings ===
Hill started his acting career at age 12 after securing the semi-regular role of Wesley Craven in the long-running Australian soap opera A Country Practice. He also appeared in commercials for cameras and snack food products including an American advertisement for chocolate and an Australian film Dead to the World as a young drug user. He then secured a role in the Australian film Flirting starring Nicole Kidman but during rehearsals he became uncomfortable with a required nude scene and he quit. At 15, Hill auditioned for the regular part of Haydn Ross in the soap opera Home and Away. He impressed the casting department and took the role. Hill forged an on-screen partnership with fellow actor Les Hill and travelled extensively promoting the show. In 1991, he appeared on Celebrity Wheel of Fortune with Ron Barassi and won for charity. Hill was also a guest at the Sydney Children's Hospital radio station that year with Dire Straits frontman Mark Knopfler.

Hill ultimately found the schedule demanding and the long days interfered with his studies at Pittwater House, Sydney. He decided to leave the series and told Nigel May from Look-in that he planned to go to college to study economics. He also joined a pop group called "Organised Crime".

Finishing high school in 1992, Hill accepted an offer to sing and perform in the British pantomime production of Peter Pan at the King Georges Hall in Blackburn, Manchester alongside British actor Arthur Bostrom. Hill was invited as a guest of the Blackburn Rovers to a match where he met and lunched with then coach Kenny Dalglish.

Hill returned to Sydney to study economics at Macquarie University. Between his studies and various other musical outfits, he continued to make numerous television and film appearances, most notably in Heartbreak High, G.P. (with actors Brian Rooney and Michael Craig), Water Rats, Peter Benchley's U.S. telemovie The Beast (alongside actors William Peterson, Karen Sillas and again Les Hill) and a brief return to Home and Away as the same character. He also co-hosted a 1993 episode of the Australian edition of Saturday Disney with then girlfriend, actress Tina Thomsen and UK host, British actress Carmen Ejogo, travelling the country to showcase its many outdoor adventures. Hill then joined a band under Cold Chisel's manager Rod Willis, the group writing and rehearsing extensively for a year, ultimately recording tracks with legendary Australian producer Charles Fisher (Savage Garden) only to part ways before any significant release.

=== 1998–2005: Waterline ===
After meeting UK born manager/producer Anthony Copping (Siva Pacifica, Robyn Loau) in 1998 and working with dance music producer Justin Shave, Hill spent a year going through Europe and the United States pursuing his songwriting by recording and playing in clubs and bars. During this time he forged a songwriting partnership with Welsh guitarist Peredur ap Gwynedd and other members of Australian artist Natalie Imbruglia's touring band. Hill also travelled to the Isle of Man to appear in the Canadian/French/U.S. co-produced TV series Dark Realm, playing guitar alongside Def Leppard's Joe Elliot and actor Corey Feldman.

He came back to Australia in 2000 and played wherever he could, adopting his middle name 'Charlton' Hill as his artist name. After multiple label deal offers, he was signed to Sony Music's Murmur record label by Head of A&R at the time John O'Donnell, whose indie roster included Lo-Tel, Something for Kate and Silverchair. Under the guidance of his U.K. manager John Wadlow (Seal), Hill continued writing and recording between the U.K. and U.S., including with members of Lenny Kravtiz's and Dave Matthews' bands, whilst still hunting for the right producer. He also spent a brief period living and writing with Adamski in Bologna, Italy. Hill ultimately returned to London to record his debut album Waterline with producer Ian Grimble (David Gray, Travis, Morcheeba) at studio 2 kHz in Willesden on the 1960s EMI TG12345 Mk 2 console originally built as a mobile unit for John Lennon. Along with Ap Gwynedd, Hill enlisted an a-list ensemble of musicians including bassist brother Rej ap Gwynedd, drummer Chuck Sabo, Sade percussionist Martin Ditcham and Brian Eno's programmer/technologist James Sanger. '2's Company' was written just prior to the album sessions and was Hill's first single, released in Australia on 14 June 2002. Hill toured extensively on the back of the album most notably with John Mayer, Phantom Planet (with Alex Greenwald and drummer/actor Jason Schwartzman), Bic Runga, The Whitlams, George and Iota, also appearing on TV talk show Rove with Shania Twain. His debut album Waterline, produced three hits: '2's Company', 'Deep' and 'Don't Sail'. Hill travelled to Iceland to film a music clip for '2's Company' with director Richard Gibson and the song stayed at No.1 on the Australian Indy chart for eight weeks. There is also a version of the song translated into Mandarin and released by Taiwanese artist Nicholas Tse on his 2004 album 'Listen Up'. The music clip for 'Deep' was filmed in Byron Bay with director George Muskens and includes footage from legendary surfing cinematographer Jack McCoy. Hill personally directed the clip for 'Don't Sail'.

In 2004, Hill collaborated with Sydney electronic collective 'Taurine', co-writing the track 'Full Moon Rises' with producer Adam Ellis. The track was released on the album 'Volume One' by Ministry of Sound UK's sub-label Hussle Recordings and Hill performed the track locally with Taurine's Kachina Lewis.

=== 2006–2009: Small Triumphs in Traffic, Supersonic ===
Hill formed Charlton Hill and the Citizens with his touring band, guitarist Tim Hartwig and bassist Ryan Van Gennip, in conjunction with band inductee drummer Jared Kneale. The band released Small Triumphs in Traffic on 1 December 2007 leading with the single "As Long as You Can". The track's music video was shot by filmmaker duo Claire McCarthy and Denson Baker.

In 2006, Hill began producing and collaborating with Supersonic, a collective of music artists and screen composers including Antony Partos, Paul Healy, Andrew Lancaster and David McCormack. Up until the end of 2009, the team was responsible for composing music for an extensive number of projects in film and television across Australia, Japan and India. Whilst on an Australian trade delegation in 2008, Hill was caught up in the Mumbai terrorist attack that claimed the life of one of the delegates and hundreds of others.

Hill began speaking publicly appearing at the renowned agIdeas Creative Masters sessions in Melbourne and returned to acting with roles in Paper Giants, Underbelly and Power Games: The Packer-Murdoch Story.

=== 2010–2020: Uncanny Valley ===
In 2010, Hill co-founded Uncanny Valley with music producer and sonic technologist, Justin Shave a songwriting and music production collective that quickly rose to prominence in both Australia and Asia. Having met and collaborated a decade earlier, the pair forged a strong bond and generated a prolific output of original and remix projects for the television, film, record and advertising industries. In 2017, the duo co-wrote 'Here' with Australian Indigenous rapper Briggs. The track featured Darwin born singer Caiti Baker and was used for the launch of the Australian NRL network Fox League. It won Best TV Theme at the 2017 Australian Guild of Screen Composers awards. The same year, Uncanny Valley was commissioned to musically direct a national campaign for the Australian Broadcasting Corporation, reimagining the song I am Australian by the one-time member of The Seekers, Bruce Woodley. This led to a string of projects curating re-records of well-known Australian songs including Howzat with Darryl Braithwaite (Sherbert), You're the Voice (John Farnham) and Great Southern Land (Icehouse).

=== 2021–present ===
In 2021, Hill and Shave, along with team Uncanny Valley which included academics from UNSW and RMIT universities, won the inaugural Eurovision inspired AI Song Contest in the Netherlands with the song 'Beautiful the World'. The song gained international attention for its groundbreaking use of AI in music as an indication of the future of augmented creativity and spawned a new chapter of investigation into the emerging tools. Hill and Shave were invited to speak at TedX Sydney and presented the topic 'Can artificial intelligence be a music collaborator?'.

In 2023, Uncanny Valley signed a global administration deal with Universal Music Publishing's Classics and Screen division, joining an illustrious roster including Danny Elfman, Nicholas Britell, Cassie Kinoshi and Afrodeutsche.

== Personal life ==
Charlton Hill and Singaporian-born, British jeweller Caroline Barrett were married in 2006 and have two children Lulu and Scarlett.

== Discography ==
=== Albums ===
List of albums, with selected details and chart positions
Title	Album details	Peak chart positions
Title	Album details	AUS
Waterline	Released: March 2003; Label: Murmur (MATTCD120); Format: CD	63
Small Triumphs in Traffic	Released: 2007; Label: Public Domain (PDR001); Format: CD	—

=== Singles ===
List of singles, with selected chart positions
Title	Year	Peak chart positions	Album
Title	Year	AUS	Album
"2's Company"	2002	36	Waterline
"Deep"	2003	63	Waterline
"Don't Sail"	2003	52	Waterline
"As Long as You Can"	2007	—	Small Triumphs in Traffic

== Filmography ==
=== Film ===
Year	Title	Role	Notes
1991	Dead to the World	Young drug taker	
1997	The Cowboy	Runner	Short film
1999	Joe Wilkinson	Andrew Wilkinson	
2000	Airhead		Short film

=== Television ===
Year	Title	Role	Notes
1988–1989	A Country Practice	Wesley Craven	7 episodes
1990–1996; 2013	Home and Away	Haydn Ross / David Morrell	160 episodes
1993	G.P.	Sean Coleman	1 episode
1996	The Beast	Chowder (uncredited)	Miniseries, 2 episodes
1999	Water Rats	Ben	1 episode
1999	Heartbreak High	Jarrod	2 episodes
2001	Dark Realm	Guitarist	1 episode
2005	The Surgeon	Paediatric Registrar	1 episode
2010	Underbelly: The Golden Mile	IA officer #1	1 episode
2011	Paper Giants: The Birth of Cleo	Alan Nye	Miniseries, 2 episodes
2012	Tricky Business	Joe Davies	Miniseries, 1 episode
2013	Power Games: The Packer–Murdoch War	Bill Jenkings	Miniseries, 2 episodes

== Theatre ==
Year	Title	Role	Notes
1992	Peter Pan		King Georges Hall in Blackburn, Manchester
