= Bad Attitude (Girlfriend song) =

Single by Girlfriend

from the album Make It Come True
- Released: December 1992
- Recorded: 1992
- Genre: Pop
- Length: 4:10
- Label: BMG Australia
- Songwriters: Steve Kipner; Paul Bliss; Lori Barth; Noel Macdonald
- Producer: Noel Macdonald

Girlfriend singles chronology
"Without You" (1992)	"Bad Attitude" (1992)	"Love's on My Mind" (1993)

"Bad Attitude" is a song recorded by Australian group Girlfriend. The song was released in December 1992 as the fourth single from their debut studio album Make It Come True. The song peaked at number 28 on the ARIA Charts.

The song was originally recorded by Laura Branigan on her 1990 self titled album.

== Track listing ==
BMG (74321126472)
No.	Title	Length
1.	"Bad Attitude"	4:10
2.	"Girl's Life" (Dance remix)	4:09
3.	"Take It from Me" (Japanese Version)	3:26
4.	"Bad Attitude" (Karaoke)	4:10

== Charts ==
Chart (1992/93)	Peak position
Australia (ARIA)	28
