= Chase the Clouds =

Studio album by Keedy
- Released: March 12, 1991
- Recorded: 1990–1991
- Studio: The Zoo; 41B Studios; Can-Am Recorders; Image Recording Studios; Trax Recording Studio
- Genre: Pop rock; dance-pop
- Length: 44:28
- Label: Arista
- Producer: Claude Gaudette; Greg Gerard; Michael Jay; Brian Malouf

Singles from Chase the Clouds
- 1. "Save Some Love" Released: May 13, 1991; 2. "Wishing on the Same Star" Released: 1991

Professional ratings
Review scores
Source	Rating
Allmusic	3.5/5 stars

Chase the Clouds is the debut and only studio album by American singer Keedy, released through Arista Records on March 12, 1991. The album includes the singles "Save Some Love" and "Wishing on the Same Star". "Save Some Love" peaked at No. 15 on the Billboard Hot 100 chart, while "Wishing on the Same Star" charted at No. 86. "Wishing on the Same Star" was later covered in Spanish by Puerto Rican singer Chayanne as "Mi Primer Amor" in 1992, Australian pop group Girlfriend in 1994, American singer Judy Cheeks in 1996, and Japanese singer Namie Amuro in 2002.

== Track listing ==
All tracks are written by Greg Gerard, except where indicated.

No.	Title	Writer(s)	Length
1.	"Save Some Love"		4:14
2.	"Wishing on the Same Star"	Diane Warren	3:51
3.	"Never Never Land"		4:19
4.	"Sorry"	Greg Gerard; Keith Montross	4:39
5.	"Only Your Heart"		4:52
6.	"Gettin' Around"	Gerard; Keedy	4:33
7.	"Don't Turn Away"		5:00
8.	"Pretty Boy"		4:08
9.	"Mama"		5:01
10.	"Lazy Day"	Gerard; Keedy	3:51
Total length:			44:28

== Personnel ==
- Keedy – lead and harmony vocals, backing vocals (2, 3, 5, 6, 8)
- Claude Gaudette – keyboards, arrangements (1), keyboard programming (2), drum programming (2), additional drum programming (3)
- Greg Gerard – keyboards, arrangements, keyboard programming (2), drum programming (2), guitars (2), backing vocals (6)
- Teddy Castellucci – guitars (1)
- Michael Thompson – guitars (2, 4)
- James Harrah – guitars (3, 5, 6, 8, 10)
- Mark Leggett – guitars (7)
- Jimmy Johnson – bass (4, 5)
- Randy Jackson – bass (6)
- Michael Jay – drum programming (1, 4, 7, 9), arrangements (1, 4, 7, 9)
- Kevin Gilbert – drum programming (3, 5, 6, 8, 10)
- Pat Mastelotto – drums (3, 5, 6, 8, 10)
- Paulinho da Costa – percussion (4, 7)
- R.U. Kidding – kazoo (1)
- Guy Roche – arrangements (2)
- Chris Gerard – backing vocals (3, 5, 6, 8, 10)
- Sara Gerard – backing vocals (8)
- Lauren Superstein – backing vocals (9)

== Production ==
- Producers – Claude Gaudette (Tracks 1, 2 & 3); Greg Gerard (All Tracks); Michael Jay (Tracks 1, 4, 7 & 9); Brian Malouf (Tracks 5, 6, 8 & 10).
- A&R – Michael Cohen
- Executive Producer on Track 2 – Brian Malouf
- Production Coordinator on Tracks 1, 4, 7 & 9 – Lauren Superstein
- Engineers – Michael McDonald (Tracks 1, 4, 7 & 9); Patrick MacDougall (Tracks 2, 3, 5, 6, 8 & 10); Frank Roszak (Track 2); Brian Malouf (Tracks 3, 5, 6, 8 & 10).
- Assistant Engineers – Patrick MacDougall (Tracks 1, 4, 7 & 9); John Jackson (Tracks 2, 3, 5, 6, 8 & 10); Lawrence Fried (Tracks 3, 5, 6, 8 & 10)
- Additional Engineer on Track 8 – Bill Gerard
- Recorded at The Zoo (Encino, CA); 41B Studios (Westlake Village, CA); Can-Am Recorders (Tarzana, CA); Image Recording Studios (Los Angeles, CA); Trax Recording Studio (Hollywood, CA).
- Mixed by Brian Malouf at Ameraycan Studios (North Hollywood, CA) and Can-Am Recorders.
- Mastered by Stephen Marcussen at Precision Mastering (Hollywood, CA).
- Art Direction and Design – Elisa Marshall
- Photography – Randee St. Nicholas
