= Shark Bay (TV series) =

- Genre: Comedy; Drama
- Created by: Peter Herbert; Ray Kolle; Steve Vizard
- Country of origin: Australia
- Original language: English
- No. of seasons: 1
- No. of episodes: 26

Production
- Executive producers: Peter Herbert; Andrew Knight; Steve Vizard
- Producer: Stephen Luby
- Running time: 5 minutes
- Production company: Artist Services

Original release
- Network: Foxtel
- Release: 22 July 1996 – 1996

Shark Bay is an Australian comedy-drama series satirising soap operas. The 26-episode series screened on Foxtel in 1996.

== Production ==
Shark Bay was the first Australian comedy-drama commissioned for cable television. It was co-created by Peter Herbert, Ray Kolle and Steve Vizard, and produced by Vizard's company Artist Services. Production on Shark Bay began in April 1996, and it was filmed at the Network Ten Studios in Melbourne. Shark Bay was broadcast in five minute episodes each weeknight at 6:55pm, with all the episodes "re-packaged" into a half-hour episode on Friday nights at 7:30pm.

== Cast ==
- Will Gluth as Peter Delaney
- Zoe Bertram as Kylie Delaney
- Joel Williams as Steve Delaney
- Dieter Brummer as Brad Delaney
- Tina Thomsen as Debbie
- Kate Gorman as Miranda Delaney
- Raelee Hill as Heather
- Frances O'Connor as Dr. Jane
- Doug Penty as Rupert/Osbert
- Lisa Baumwol as Daphne/Delilah
- Tiriel Mora as Justin Farraday
- Rowena Wallace as Clarissa Delaney

Additionally, Peter O'Brien, Kerry Armstrong, Lois Collier, Roger Oakley, Adrian Lee, Tottie Goldsmith and Scott Michaelson appeared in guest roles.

== Reception ==
Malcolm Knox of The Sydney Morning Herald thought there was a layer of irony in the actors who have appeared in the soaps they are sending up, and while it is funny, it also "makes you feel slightly uneasy, as if the actors are getting more laughs out of this than you are." He gave the show a positive review, saying it "deserves more than a passing glance. As far as gags are concerned, there are enough hits to tide over the misses, and the real highlight is the maturation of two great comic talents in Tiriel Mora and Frances O'Connor."
