= Screen Directors Playhouse =

American radio and television anthology series

- Joan Crawford in a production of Flamingo Road on the May 26, 1950 radio version of Screen Directors Playhouse.
- Other names: NBC Theater; Screen Directors Guild Assignment; Screen Directors Assignment
- Genre: Anthology drama
- Running time: 30 minutes (radio episodes 1–8 and 10–75) and all television episodes 1 hour (radio episodes 9 and 76–122)
- Country of origin: United States
- Language: English
- Home station: NBC (1949–51 and 1955–56); ABC (1956)
- Hosted by: radio hosts: Frank Barton (announcer); Hal Gibney; Jimmy Wallington (1949–51)
- Starring: Each radio and television episode used predominantly top-tier personalities
- Written by: radio scripts: Richard Alan Simmons, Milton Geiger, Jack Rubin, Nat Wolf
- Directed by: radio: Bill Karn, Warren Lewis
- Produced by: radio: Howard Wylie
- Original release: January 9, 1949 (radio version)/October 5, 1955 (television version) – September 28, 1951 (radio version)/September 26, 1956 (television version)
- No. of episodes: 122
- Audio format: Monaural sound

Screen Directors Playhouse (sometimes written as Screen Directors' Playhouse) is an American radio and television anthology series which brought leading Hollywood actors to the NBC microphones beginning in 1949. The radio program broadcast adaptations of films, with original directors of the films sometimes involved in the productions, although their participation was usually limited to introducing the radio adaptations and taking a brief "curtain call" with the cast and host at the end of the program. During the 1955–56 season, the series was seen on television, focusing on original teleplays and several adaptations of famous short stories (such as Robert Louis Stevenson's "Markheim").

== Radio ==
The radio version ran for 122 episodes and aired on NBC from January 9, 1949, to September 28, 1951, under several different titles: NBC Theater, Screen Directors Guild Assignment, Screen Directors Assignment and, as of July 1, 1949, Screen Directors Playhouse.

Actors on the radio series included Fred Astaire, Lucille Ball, Tallulah Bankhead, Charles Boyer, Claudette Colbert, Ronald Colman, Gary Cooper, Joan Crawford, Bette Davis, Marlene Dietrich, Kirk Douglas, Irene Dunne, Douglas Fairbanks Jr., Henry Fonda, Cary Grant, William Holden, Burt Lancaster, James Mason, Ray Milland, Gregory Peck, William Powell, Edward G. Robinson, Norma Shearer, Barbara Stanwyck, James Stewart, John Wayne, and Loretta Young.

== Television ==
The television version, produced and filmed at Hal Roach Studios, was broadcast for one season of 35 half-hour episodes on NBC, under the sponsorship of Eastman Kodak, airing from October 5, 1955, to June 1956. The final episodes aired on ABC beginning in July 1956 and ending on September 26, 1956.

Hal Roach Studios produced the program, and members of the Screen Directors Guild directed the 30-minute filmed episodes. The guild used its income to support its educational and benevolent foundation.

John Wayne appeared in the episode "Rookie of the Year", in "his only real dramatic role on TV", and Errol Flynn's first dramatic role on TV came in "The Sword of Villon".

Billed in the opening credits of their respective television episodes are: Lee Aaker (episode 8), Lola Albright (episode 4), John Alderson (episode 35), Leon Ames (episode 5), Lew Ayres (episode 20), Lynn Bari (episode 4), Ralph Bellamy (episode 19), William Bendix (episode 35), John Bentley (episode 30), Charles Bickford (episode 11), Janet Blair (episode 28), Ward Bond (episode 10), Neville Brand (episode 4), Walter Brennan (episode 8), Hillary Brooke (episode 22), Joe E. Brown (episode 12), Edgar Buchanan (episode 8), Rory Calhoun (episodes 2 and 14), Macdonald Carey (episodes 18 and 32), Jack Carson (episode 4), Joan Caulfield (episode 32), Gower Champion (episode 27), Marge Champion (episode 27), Fred Clark (episode 5), Constance Cummings (episode 33), Linda Darnell (episode 30), Laraine Day (episodes 7 and 17), Yvonne deCarlo (episode 14), Brandon deWilde (episode 29), Bobby Driscoll (episode 2), James Dunn (episode 18), Leo Durocher (episode 17), Robert Easton (episode 15), Buddy Ebsen (episode 28), Marilyn Erskine (episode 21), Frank Fay (episode 9), Errol Flynn (episode 22), Scott Forbes (episode 30), Wallace Ford (episode 20), Sally Forrest (episode 5), Rita Gam (episode 19), Nancy Gates (episode 9), Leo Genn (episode 13), Greta Granstedt (episode 19), Barbara Hale (episode 1), Don Hanmer (episode 3), Dick Haymes (episode 18), Dennis Hopper (episode 35), Kim Hunter (episode 3), Buster Keaton (episode 12), Angela Lansbury (episode 24), Peter Lawford (episode 9), Cloris Leachman (episode 6), Sheldon Leonard (episode 15), Peter Lorre (episode 16), James Lydon (episode 5), Jeanette MacDonald (episode 17), Jimmy McHugh (episode 21), Fred MacMurray (episode 21), Lotfi Mansouri (episode 34), Vera Miles (episode 10), Ray Milland (episode 23), Sal Mineo (episode 26), Thomas Mitchell (episode 7), George Montgomery (episode 24), Patricia Morison (episode 26), Barry Nelson (episode 28), Edmond O'Brien (episode 25), Dan O'Herlihy (episode 7), Dennis O'Keefe (episode 15), ZaSu Pitts (episode 12), Basil Rathbone (episode 19), Philip Reed (episode 13), Robert Ryan (episode 11), George Sanders (episodes 26 and 33), Herb Shriner (episode 1), Mary Sinclair (episode 28), Rod Steiger (episode 23), William Talman (episode 16), Casey Tibbs (episode 29), June Vincent (episodes 14 [not billed in opening credits] and 18), John Wayne (episode 10), Pat Wayne (episode 10), Michael Wilding (episode 31), Fay Wray (episode 15), Teresa Wright (episode 16), Keenan Wynn (episode 3), May Wynn (episode 13) and Alan Young (episode 6). But there was one difference between the two versions of the program: while the radio program had presented only condensed versions of well-known plays and films, the television version presented mostly original dramas.

The directors of television episodes are: Lewis Allen, Claude Binyon, Frank Borzage (3 episodes), John Brahm (2 episodes), David Butler, Gower Champion, William Dieterle, Allan Dwan (2 episodes), John Ford, Tay Garnett (3 episodes), Hugo Haas, Byron Haskin, Stuart Heisler, Ida Lupino, Leo McCarey (2 episodes), Norman Z. McLeod, George Marshall, Ted Post, H. C. Potter, John Rich, William A. Seiter, George Sherman, Andrew L. Stone, Ted Tetzlaff, Frank Tuttle, George Waggner (2 episodes) and Fred Zinnemann.

=== Directors, vital dates, years of activity as director, episode titles, writers and broadcast dates ===
1. Leo McCarey (1896–1969, 1921–62) "Meet the Governor" (October 5, 1955; also wrote)
2. Frank Borzage (1894–1962, 1913–61) "Day Is Done" (October 12, 1955; written by William Tunberg)
3. John Brahm (1893–1982, 1936–67) "A Midsummer Daydream" (October 19, 1955; written by William Saroyan)
4. George Waggner (1894–1984, 1938–67) "Arroyo" (October 26, 1955; also wrote)
5. William A. Seiter (1890–1964, 1915–60) "Want Ad Wedding" (November 2, 1955; written by Dane Lussier and Gertrude Walker)
6. Norman Z. McLeod (1895–1964, 1928–63) "Life of Vernon Hathaway" (November 9, 1955; written by Barbara Merlin; story by Richard Wormser)
7. Andrew L. Stone (1902–1999, 1927–72) "The Final Tribute" (November 16, 1955; also wrote; story by Octavus Roy Cohen)
8. Stuart Heisler (1896–1979, 1936–64) "The Brush Roper" (November 23, 1955; written by William Tunberg and Fred Gipson; story by Gipson)
9. Leo McCarey (see no. 1) "Tom and Jerry" (November 30, 1955; written by Leo McCarey's daughter, Mary McCarey)
10. John Ford (1894–1973, 1917–66) "Rookie of the Year" (December 7, 1955; written by Frank Nugent; story by W. R. Burnett)
11. H. C. Potter (1904–1977, 1936–57) "Lincoln's Doctor's Dog" (December 14, 1955; written by William R. Cox; story by Christopher Morley)
12. George Marshall (1891–1975, 1916–72) "The Silent Partner" (December 21, 1955; also wrote; story by Barbara Hammer)
13. Ted Tetzlaff (1903–1995, 1941–59) "The Titanic Incident" (December 28, 1955; written by William R. Cox)
14. Tay Garnett (1894–1977, 1924–75) "Hot Cargo" (January 4, 1956; also story; written by David Dortort)
15. Allan Dwan (1885–1981, 1911–61) "It's Always Sunday" (January 11, 1956; written by D. D. Beauchamp; story by Jesse Goldstein and Frank Fox)
16. Ida Lupino (1918–1995, 1949–68) "No. 5 Checked Out" (January 18, 1956; also story; written by Willard Wiener)
17. David Butler (1894–1979, 1927–67) "Prima Donna" (February 1, 1956; written by Peter Milne and Gene Raymond; story by Raymond)
18. George Sherman (1908–1991, 1937–78) "Cry Justice" (February 15, 1956; written by Donald Hyde)
19. Byron Haskin (1899–1984, 1927–68) "Affair in Sumatra" (February 22, 1956; written by Michael Fessier; story by Hobart Donavan)
20. William Dieterle (1893–1972, 1923–68) "One Against Many" (March 7, 1956; written by Donald S. Sanford; story by John Jacobs and Malvin Ward)
21. Claude Binyon (1905–1978, 1948–56) "It's a Most Unusual Day" (March 14, 1956; also wrote; story by William R. Cox)
22. George Waggner (see no. 4) "The Sword of Villon" (April 4, 1956; written by Wilbur S. Peacock)
23. Fred Zinnemann (1907–1997, 1930–82) "Markheim" (April 11, 1956; written by John McGreevey and Paul Osborn [another source indicates Alfred Harris]; story by Robert Louis Stevenson)
24. Frank Tuttle (1892–1963, 1922–59) "Claire" (April 25, 1956; written by Philip MacDonald and George Sinclair; story by Ruth Capps)
25. Frank Borzage (see no. 2) "A Ticket for Thaddeus" (May 9, 1956; written by A. I. Bezzerides; story by Rose C. Feld)
26. Hugo Haas (1901–1968, 1933–62) "The Dream" (May 16, 1956; written by John McGreevey [another source indicates Richard Karlan and Patricia Karlan]; story by Ivan Turgenev)
27. Gower Champion (1921–1980, 1956–74) "What Day Is It?" (June 6, 1956; written by Jean Holloway)
28. Lewis Allen (1905–2000, 1943–77) "Every Man Has Two Wives" (June 13, 1956; written by DeWitt Bodeen and Frank Gill, Jr.; story by Thames Williamson)
29. Tay Garnett (see no. 14) "Partners" (July 4, 1956; also story; written by Winston Miller)
30. Ted Post (1918–2013, 1950–99) "White Corridors" (July 11, 1956; written by Irving Cooper and Helen Cooper)
31. Tay Garnett (see no. 14 and no. 29) "The Carroll Formula" (July 18, 1956; written by John L. Greene)
32. John Rich (1925–2012, 1951–99) "Apples on the Lilac Tree" (July 25, 1956; written by Lee Loeb and Phil Shuken)
33. John Brahm (see no. 3) "The Bitter Waters" (August 1, 1956; written by Zoe Akins; story "Louisa Pallant" by Henry James)
34. Frank Borzage (see no. 2 and no. 25) "The Day I Met Caruso" (September 5, 1956; written by Zoe Akins; story by Elizabeth Bacon Rodewald)
35. Allan Dwan (see no. 15) "High Air" (September 12, 1956; written by A. I. Bezzerides; story by Borden Chase)

=== Directors listed by number of "Best Director" Academy Award nominations ===
1. Fred Zinnemann (seven): The Search (1948), High Noon (1952), From Here to Eternity (1953: winner), The Nun's Story (1959), The Sundowners (1960), A Man for All Seasons (1966: winner) and Julia (1977) [also received three nominations as producer (1952: winner, 1960 and 1966: winner)]
2. John Ford (five): The Informer (1935: winner), Stagecoach (1939), The Grapes of Wrath (1940: winner), How Green Was My Valley (1941: winner) and The Quiet Man (1952: winner) [also received one nomination as producer (1952)]
3. Leo McCarey (three): The Awful Truth (1937: winner), Going My Way (1944: winner) and The Bells of St. Mary's (1945) [also received four nominations for writing (1939, 1940, 1944: winner and 1952) and one nomination for original song (1958)]
4. Frank Borzage (two): 7th Heaven (1927: winner) and Bad Girl (1931: winner)
5. William Dieterle (one): The Life of Emile Zola (1937)

== Television episodes ==
Opening announcement: "SCREEN DIRECTORS PLAYHOUSE. Bringing you each week an outstanding original screenplay chosen and directed by one of the country's foremost motion picture directors."

| No. | Title | Directed by | Written by | Stars | Original release date |
|---|---|---|---|---|---|
| 1 | "Meet the Governor" | Leo McCarey | Leo McCarey | Herb Shriner and Barbara Hale | October 5, 1955 |
Announcer: "Tonight our director is Leo McCarey, three-time Academy Award winner and creator of such famous pictures as Ruggles of Red Gap, The Awful Truth and Going My Way. The story Mr. McCarey has selected for us this evening is called 'Meet The Governor' and it stars Herb Shriner, in his first dramatic role on television, and co-stars Barbara Hale." Styled in the manner of an episode from a filmed sitcom, replete with a laugh track.: Herb Shriner as Clem Waters; Barbara Hale as Jane Waters; Rita Lynn as Mrs. Lamkin; Bobby Clark as Sonny Waters; Paul Harvey as Mr. Dirks; Arthur Q. Bryan as Mr. Hurley; Hayden Rorke as Lawyer; Claud Allister as Butler; William Forrest as Mr. Green; Oliver Cliff as Decorator
| 2 | "Day Is Done" | Frank Borzage | William Tunberg | Rory Calhoun and Bobby Driscoll | October 12, 1955 |
Announcer: "Tonight, our director is Academy Award winner Frank Borzage, creator of such celebrated pictures as Seventh Heaven and A Farewell to Arms. The story Mr. Borzage has selected for us this evening is entitled 'Day Is Done' and it stars Rory Calhoun and Bobby Driscoll." Announcer: "Next week, Gower Champion will make his first appearance as a director when he brings us a sparkling dance comedy entitled, 'What Day Is It?' Teamed with Gower will be his lovely wife and partner, Marge Champion. One of the show's highlights will be their famous clown dance. A happy half hour will be yours to enjoy next week when Screen Directors Playhouse brings you 'What Day Is It?' Be sure to join us.": Rory Calhoun as Sgt. Norris; Bobby Driscoll as Pvt. Zane; Richard Crane as Archer; Douglas Dick as Carlson; Michael Emmet as Capt. Harris; James Goodwin as Jones; Robert Arthur as 1st Soldier; Wright King as 2nd Soldier; Ron Kennedy as 3rd Soldier; Bill White, Jr. as 4th Soldier
| 3 | "A Midsummer Daydream" | John Brahm | William Saroyan | Kim Hunter Keenan Wynn Don Hanmer | October 19, 1955 |
Announcer: "Tonight we are pleased to present the noted director John Brahm. Mr. Brahm has chosen for this evening a bright and amusing story by the Pulitzer Prize-winning dramatist William Saroyan. The story is entitled 'A Midsummer Daydream' and it stars Kim Hunter, Keenan Wynn and Don Hanmer.": Kim Hunter as Elizabeth; Keenan Wynn as Gambler; Don Hanmer as Patrick; Bea Benaderet as Woman; Don Wilson as Man; Eilene Janssen as Girl; Michael Monroe as Boy; David Hoffman as Mr. Glooteneye; Roy Glenn as Bootblack [listed in the credits, but does not appear]
| 4 | "Arroyo" | George Waggner | Unknown | TBA | October 26, 1955 |
| 5 | "Want Ad Wedding" | William A. Seiter | Unknown | TBA | November 2, 1955 |
| 6 | "Life of Vernon Hathaway" | Norman Z. McLeod | Barbara Merlin From a story by Richard Wormser | Alan Young and Cloris Leachman | November 9, 1955 |
Announcer: "Next week, Screen Directors Playhouse welcomes the versatile Hollywood director, Andrew Stone, whose many fine pictures include The Night Holds Terror, The Steel Trap and The Great Victor Herbert. For next week's production, Mr. Stone has written a dramatic story of the medical profession entitled 'Final Tribute'. The stars will be Laraine Day, Dan O'Herlihy and Thomas Mitchell. Be sure to join us.": Ernest Stockhoeffer; Alan Young as Vernon Hathaway; Cloris Leachman as Irma; Jay Novello as Morley; Douglas Dumbrille as Beecham; Raymond Bailey as Barnes; Florenz Ames as Vandemeer; Herb Vigran as Stranger; Roy Glenn as Porter
| 7 | "The Final Tribute" | Andrew L. Stone | Teleplay by Andrew L. Stone From a story by Octavus Roy Cohen | Laraine Day Dan O'Herlihy Thomas Mitchell | November 16, 1955 |
Announcer: "Next week, Screen Directors Playhouse welcomes Mr. David Butler, director of such hits as Calamity Jane with star Doris Day, Glory and April in Paris. Mr. Butler will bring us a hilarious musical about a famous singing star, her protege and two famous celebrities. 'Prima Donna' will star Jeanette MacDonald, with special guest stars Laraine Day and Leo Durocher. Be sure to join us.": Laraine Day as Joyce Carter; Dan O'Herlihy as Dr. Kent; Thomas Mitchell as Dr. Walton; Jonathan Hale as Mayor; Eddie Marr as Alex; Joyce McCluskey as Margie's Mother; Emlen Davies as Mrs. Cole; Marjorie Stapp as Mrs. Raglund; Linda Lowell as Margie; Kenneth Osmond as Raglund Boy
| 8 | "The Brush Roper" | Stuart Heisler | William Tunberg and Fred Gipson From a story by Fred Gipson | Walter Brennan Lee Aaker and Edgar Buchanan | November 23, 1955 |
Announcer: "Tonight, we are pleased to welcome Mr. Stuart Heisler who has directed such outstanding pictures as Biscuit Eater, Smash-Up and Blue Skies. For this evening, Mr. Heisler has chosen a humorous western story entitled 'The Brush Roper', which stars Walter Brennan in the leading role.": Walter Brennan as Grandpa; Lee Aaker as Cowhide; Edgar Buchanan as Sub Doyal; Olive Carey as Grandma; Chuck Connors as Art Shirley
| 9 | "Tom and Jerry" | Leo McCarey | Unknown | TBA | November 30, 1955 |
| 10 | "Rookie of the Year" | John Ford | Written by Frank Nugent From a story by W. R. Burnett | John Wayne, Vera Miles, Ward Bond and introducing Pat Wayne | December 7, 1955 |
Announcer: "Tonight, our director is John Ford, the only man ever to win four Academy Awards for direction. Mr. Ford has selected a fascinating story about the baseball world entitled 'Rookie of the Year'. The starring role is played by one of Hollywood's best known stars, John Wayne, in his first dramatic role on television, and introduces his son, Pat Wayne." Screen Directors Playhouse is brought to you on film by the men and women of Eastman Kodak and Kodak dealers everywhere.": John Wayne as Mike Cronin; Vera Miles as Ruth Dahlberg; Ward Bond as Buck Goodhue; Pat Wayne as Lyn Goodhue as; James Gleason as Ed Shafer; Willis Bouchey as Cully; Harry Tyler as Mr. White; William Forrest as Walker; Robert Leyden as Willie; Tiger Fafara as Bobby
| 11 | "Lincoln's Doctor's Dog" | H. C. Potter | William R. Cox from a story by Christopher Morley | Robert Ryan and Charles Bickford | December 14, 1955 |
Announcer: "Tonight, our director is Mr. H. C. Potter, whose Hollywood and Broadway successes include Mr. Blandings Builds His Dream House and Point of No Return. For this evening, Mr. Potter directs a new television drama entitled 'Lincoln's Doctor's Dog'. The stars are Robert Ryan, Charles Bickford and Richard Long." Introduction by H. C. Potter: "For a long time, it had been an axiom, among book publishers, that stories with a medical background, stories about pets, and incidents in the life of Abraham Lincoln were invariably popular. And the publishers nodded wistfully to each other that a title like 'Lincoln's Doctor's Dog', the triple threat, would be practically irresistible. But nobody ever did anything about it. Until, one day, recently, my friend Christopher Morley, one of the most prolific and best loved American authors, began to dream. Did Lincoln, perhaps, have a doctor, who had a dog, who had a story?" February 11, 1863 [on-screen caption]: Robert Ryan as Abraham Lincoln; Charles Bickford as Dr. Stone; Richard Long as Capt. Leipole; Willis Bouchey as Edwin Stanton; Howard Wendell as Wm. Seward; Johnny Lee as Simon; Paul Keast as Salmon Chase; Mack Williams as Montgomery Blair; John Craven as Reporter; Dennis King, Jr. as Petitioner
| 12 | "The Silent Partner" | George Marshall | Written by Barbara Hammer from a story by Barbara Hammer and George Marshall | Buster Keaton ZaSu Pitts Joe E. Brown | December 21, 1955 |
ZaSu Pitts as Selma; Joe E. Brown as Arthur Vail; Evelyn Ankers as Miss Loving; Jack Kruschen as Ernie; Jack Elam as Shanks; Percy Helton as Barney; Joseph Corey as Arnold; Lyle Latell as Ernie's friend; Charles Horvath as Barber
| 13 | "The Titanic Incident" | Ted Tetzlaff | Written by William R. Cox | Leo Genn, May Wynn and Philip Reed | December 28, 1955 |
Announcer: "Tonight, Screen Directors Playhouse welcomes Mr. Ted Tetzlaff, whose many directorial credits include The Window and The White Tower. Tonight, Mr. Tetzlaff directs a story of a gamble at sea aboard the most glamorous ship of its day, entitled 'The Titanic Incident', starring Leo Genn in his first dramatic role on television. Screen Directors Playhouse is brought to you on film by the men and women of Eastman Kodak and Kodak dealers everywhere.": Leo Genn as Paul; May Wynn as Susan; Philip Reed as Sir Hubert; Mike McHale as Deck Officer; Barbara Morrison as Mrs. Van Owen; Pat Whyte as Mr. Fothergill; Michael Hadlow as Cabin Steward; Paul Fielding as Mr. Van Owen; Ramsay Hill as Mr. Ogden; George Leigh as Dining Steward
| 14 | "Hot Cargo" | Tay Garnett | Written by David Dortort From a story by Tay Garnett | Rory Calhoun Yvonne deCarlo | January 4, 1956 |
Announcer: "Tonight, we are pleased to present the distinguished Hollywood director Tay Garnett, whose well known motion pictures include A Connecticut Yankee in King Arthur's Court, with Bing Crosby, The Postman Always Rings Twice and The Black Knight. For this evening, Mr. Garnett has selected the dramatic story entitled 'Hot Cargo'. The stars are Rory Calhoun and Yvonne deCarlo.": Yvonne deCarlo as Pearl; Rory Calhoun as Joe Mahoney; Alan Reed as Capt. Swenson; June Vincent as Society Doll; Peter Brocco as Mike; George Lloyd as 1st. Crewman; Joe Haworth as 2nd. Crewman; Joel Smith as 3rd. Crewman; Frank Richards as 4th. Crewman
| 15 | "It's Always Sunday" | Allan Dwan | Written by D. D. Beauchamp from a story by Jesse Goldstein and Frank Fox | Dennis O'Keefe Sheldon Leonard with Fay Wray | January 11, 1956 |
Announcer: "Tonight, Screen Directors Playhouse welcomes Mr. Allan Dwan, director of Sands of Iwo Jima, starring John Wayne. For this evening, Mr. Dwan brings us a warmly human story about a minister and a tramp, entitled 'It's Always Sunday'. Our stars are Dennis O'Keefe, Sheldon Leonard and Fay Wray.": Dennis O'Keefe as Rev. Parker; Sheldon Leonard as George; Fay Wray as Mary Parker; Chick Chandler as Eddie; Grant Withers as Wm. Brackett, Sr.; Eilene Janssen as Nancy Parker; Robert Easton as Stanley Moran; Terry Rangno as Danny Parker; Diane Jergens as Sue Stradler; Jimmy Hayes as Bill Brackett
| 16 | "No. 5 Checked Out" | Ida Lupino | Written by Willard Wiener from a story by Ida Lupino | Teresa Wright Peter Lorre and William Talman | January 18, 1956 |
Announcer: "Tonight, Screen Directors Playhouse proudly presents Miss Ida Lupino, renowned for her direction of The Hitch-Hiker and The Bigamist. For this evening, Miss Lupino brings us the searching story of a deaf girl and the man she is afraid to love, entitled 'No. 5 Checked Out'. In tonight's cast are Teresa Wright, Peter Lorre and William Talman.": Teresa Wright as Mary; Peter Lorre as Willy; William Talman as Barney; Ralph Moody as Jarvis
| 17 | "Prima Donna" | David Butler | Written by Gene Raymond and Peter Milne from a story by Gene Raymond | Jeanette MacDonald and Special Guest Stars Laraine Day Leo Durocher | February 1, 1956 |
Announcer: "Tonight, Screen Directors Playhouse welcomes Mr. David Butler, director of the musical Calamity Jane, which starred Doris Day, and the recently released Glory. For this evening, Mr. Butler will bring us a happy musical treat entitled 'Prima Donna'. Our star is Jeanette MacDonald with special guest stars Laraine Day and Leo Durocher.": Jeanette MacDonald as Martha; Laraine Day as Herself; Leo Durocher as Himself; Jerome Cowan as Lewis; Jacqueline deWit as Emmy; Jane Darwell as Lena; Alfred Caiazza as Johnny; Jack Lomas as Tad; Miss MacDonald's Gowns by Werlé; Note: Gene Raymond, who wrote the story and co-wrote the teleplay, was married to Jeanette MacDonald from 1937 until her death in 1965.
| 18 | "Cry Justice" | George Sherman | Written by Donald Hyde | MacDonald Carey Dick Haymes James Dunn with June Vincent | February 15, 1956 |
Announcer: "Tonight, Screen Directors Playhouse welcomes Mr. George Sherman, noted for his direction of many fine western films. His pictures include The Treasure of Pancho Villa and Chief Crazy Horse. For this evening, Mr. Sherman brings us an exciting story of the old west entitled 'Cry Justice'. Our stars are MacDonald Carey, Dick Haymes and James Dunn. Screen Directors Playhouse is brought to you on film by the men and women of Eastman Kodak and Kodak dealers everywhere." Announcer: "Next week, Screen Directors Playhouse welcomes Mr. Byron Haskin, noted for his direction of such exciting films as The Naked Jungle and His Majesty O'Keefe. Mr. Haskin will bring us an intriguing story of romance set against the tropical background, entitled 'Affair in Sumatra', with Ralph Bellamy, Rita Gam and Basil Rathbone. Be sure to join us.": MacDonald Carey as Gil Foster; Dick Haymes as Jim Wheeler; James Dunn as Sheriff Garrett as; June Vincent as June; Roy Roberts as Judge; Trevas Bardette as Deputy; Paul Bryar as Clem; Nacho Galindo as Mexican; Announcer: "Each week at this time, the Eastman Kodak company invites you to see an outstanding screenplay, produced on Eastman Kodak film with all the scope and realism that only modern motion picture techniques make possible, and brought to you on Screen Directors Playhouse."
| 19 | "Affair in Sumatra" | Byron Haskin | Unknown | TBA | February 22, 1956 |
| 20 | "One Against Many" | William Dieterle | Unknown | TBA | March 7, 1956 |
| 21 | "It's a Most Unusual Day" | Claude Binyon | Unknown | TBA | March 14, 1956 |
| 22 | "The Sword of Villon" | George Waggner | Unknown | TBA | April 4, 1956 |
| 23 | "Markheim" | Fred Zinnemann | Unknown | TBA | April 11, 1956 |
| 24 | "Claire" | Frank Tuttle | Philip MacDonald and George Sinclair From a story by Ruth Capps | George Montgomery Angela Lansbury | April 25, 1956 |
Announcer: "Tonight Screen Directors Playhouse welcomes Mr. Frank Tuttle, whose pictures include Waikiki Wedding and Hell on Frisco Bay starring Alan Ladd.: Angela Lansbury as Vera Wayne; Armanda Randolph as Kate; Jean Willes as Roberta; William Erwin as Carl
| 25 | "A Ticket for Thaddeus" | Frank Borzage | Unknown | TBA | May 9, 1956 |
| 26 | "The Dream" | Hugo Haas | Teleplay by Richard and Patricia Karlan Based on a short story by Ivan Turgenev | George Sanders Sal Mineo Patricia Morison | May 16, 1956 |
Announcer: "Tonight, our director is Mr. Hugo Haas, one of Hollywood's newest and most talented director-actors. Announcer: "Our stars are George Sanders, Sal Mineo and Patricia Morison.": George Sanders as The Baron; Sal Mineo as Charles Monet; Patricia Morison as Vivienne Monet; John Banner as Prefect of Police; Lita Milan as Amelia; Andre Villon as Waiter; Norbert Schiller as Old Man; Felix Nelson as The Negro; Note: Ivan Turgenev's short story "The Dream" [original title "Сон" ("Sohn")], was initially published in 1877.
| 27 | "What Day Is It?" | Gower Champion | Unknown | TBA | June 6, 1956 |
| 28 | "Every Man Has Two Wives" | Lewis Allen | Frank Gill, Jr. and DeWitt Bodeen From a story by Thames Williamson | Barry Nelson Janet Blair Buddy Ebsen Mary Sinclair | June 13, 1956 |
Announcer: "Tonight, Screen Directors Playhouse welcomes Mr. Lewis Allen, director of such famous films as Our Hearts Were Young and Gay and The Uninvited. For this evening, Mr. Allen brings us a delightful comedy entitled 'Every Man Has Two Wives'. Our stars are Barry Nelson, Janet Blair, Buddy Ebsen and Mary Sinclair." Styled in the manner of an episode from a filmed sitcom, replete with a laugh track.: Barry Nelson as Bill; Janet Blair as Della; Buddy Ebsen as Fred; Mary Sinclair as Fay; Dave Willock as Counterman; Margaret Bert as Powdermaid
| 29 | "Partners" | Tay Garnett | Unknown | TBA | July 4, 1956 |
| 30 | "White Corridors" | Ted Post | Unknown | TBA | July 11, 1956 |
| 31 | "The Carroll Formula" | Tay Garnett | Story and teleplay by John L. Greene | Michael Wilding | July 18, 1956 |
Announcer: "Tonight, Screen Directors Playhouse welcomes Mr. Tay Garnett, famous for his direction of such comedy hits as A Connecticut Yankee in King Arthur's Court. For this evening, Mr. Garnett brings us the hilarious story of a young English professor who stumbles unto a fantastic secret written between the lines of Alice in Wonderland. Our story 'The Carroll Formula'. Our star Michael Wilding.": Michael Wilding as David Scott; Havis Davenport as Sylvia Richardson; Dayton Lummis as Dr. Hoffman; Steven Geray as Dr. Lehndorff; Howard McNear as Dr. Curtis; Peter Whitney as Attendant; Donald McBride as Col. Hobson; Roy Roberts as General Lafferty; Donald Barry as Soldier
| 32 | "Apples on the Lilac Tree" | John Rich | Unknown | TBA | July 25, 1956 |
| 33 | "The Bitter Waters" | John Brahm | Teleplay by Zoe Akins from a story by Henry James | George Sanders and Constance Cummings | August 1, 1956 |
Announcer: "Tonight's Screen Directors Playhouse welcomes the distinguished Hollywood director Mr. John Brahm. For this evening, Mr. Brahm has chosen the story of a beautiful woman's struggle to combat the specter of an ambitious pact. Based on a famous short story by Henry James, our play is called 'The Bitter Waters'. Our stars are George Sanders and Constance Cummings.": George Sanders as Charles Ferris; Constance Cummings as Louisa Pallant; Robert Vaughn as Archibald Parker; Cynthia Baxter as Linda Pallant; Celia Lovsky as Frau Traurnicht; Barbara Morrison as Mrs. Gimingham; Herbert as Jerry Barclay; Note: Henry James' "Louisa Pallant", variously described as a short story or a novella, was initially published in the February 1888 issue of Harper's New Monthly Magazine.
| 34 | "The Day I Met Caruso" | Frank Borzage | Teleplay by Zoe Akins from a story by Elizabeth Bacon Rodewald | The voice of Enrico Caruso as recorded by R.C.A. VICTOR Album LM 6127 Introducing Lotfi Mansouri | September 5, 1956 |
Announcer: "Tonight, Screen Directors Playhouse is proud to again welcome the distinguished Academy Award-winning director Frank Borzage. Mr. Borzage brings us an unusual musical treat based on a true story from the life of Enrico Caruso and featuring the actual voice of the immortal singer. Our story is entitled 'The Day I Met Caruso'... and introduces Lotfi Mansouri in the title role." Announcer: "Next week, Screen Directors Playhouse presents Mr. Allan Dwan, director of such famous hits as Brewster's Millions and Sands of Iwo Jima. Mr. Dwan has chosen an exciting drama of the men who tunnel through treacherous mud and rock in the high pressure atmosphere under our nation's great rivers. Be sure to join us next week when William Bendix stars in 'High Air'.": Lotfi Mansouri as Caruso; Sandy Descher as Elizabeth; Bill Walker as Porter; Emily Lawrence as Cousin Hannah; Walter Coy as Father; Barbara Eiler as Mother; Tito Vuolo as Valet
| 35 | "High Air" | Allan Dwan | Teleplay by A. I. Bezzerides From a story by Borden Chase | William Bendix Dennis Hopper and John Alderson | September 12, 1956 |
Announcer: "Tonight, Screen Directors Playhouse presents Mr. Allan Dwan, director of such famous hits as Brewster's Millions and Sands of Iwo Jima. Mr. Dwan brings us an exciting drama that pits father against son in the treacherous high pressure atmosphere of a tunnel construction job. Our story is entitled 'High Air'. Our star William Bendix." Announcer: "Next week, Screen Directors Playhouse welcomes Academy Award winner Frank Borzage, whose hits include 7th Heaven and A Farewell to Arms. Mr. Borzage has chosen a heartwarming story of a new citizen's awakening to American freedom... entitled 'A Ticket for Thaddeus'. Edmond O'Brien will star in the title role. Be sure to join us.": William Bendix as Joe Redman; Dennis Hopper as Steve Redman; John Alderson as "Swede"; Leo Gordon as Tom Martin; Hal Baylor as Man with Bends; William Doty as Sandhogger #1; Don Kennedy as Sandhogger #2; Mike Ragan as Sandhogger #3; John Mitchum as Sandhogger #4; Duane Thorson as Sandhogger #5

== Sources ==
- Audio Classics Archive Radio Logs: Screen Directors Playhouse
