= Dead to the World (disambiguation) =

Dead to the World is a live video album by American rock band Marilyn Manson.

Dead to the World may also refer to:

- Dead to the World Tour, Marilyn Manson's 1996–1997 tour
- Dead to the World (album), a 2016 album by Helmet
- "Dead to the World", a song by Patti Smith song from Gone Again
- "Dead to the World", a song by Nightwish from Century Child
- "Dead to the World" (iZombie), the first story arc in iZombie (comic book)
- Dead to the World (novel), the fourth novel in Charlaine Harris's Southern Vampire series
- Dead to the World (film), a 1991 Australian film
