= The Cat Creeps =

The Cat Creeps may refer to:

- The Cat Creeps (1930 film)
- The Cat Creeps (1946 film)
