= Sick with Love =

1997 single by Robyn Loau

Single by Robyn Loau

from the album Malaria: The Lost Album
- B-side: "Sick with Jungle"; "Turn Away" (remix)
- Released: September 1997
- Studio: Sun (Sydney, Australia)
- Length: 3:44
- Label: Polydor
- Songwriters: Robyn Loau; Adamski; Anthony Copping
- Producers: Anthony Copping; Adamski

Robyn Loau singles chronology
"Sick with Love" (1997)	"Love Addiction" (1998)

"Sick with Love" is a song by Australian singer and songwriter Robyn Loau. The song was released as her debut solo single in September 1997, serving as the lead single from her debut studio album, Malaria: The Lost Album, which was not released until 2009 due to Polydor Records replacing their staff shortly before the album's planned launch in 1998. "Sick with Love" peaked at number 21 on the Australian ARIA Singles Chart and polled at number 71 on the Triple J Hottest 100, 1997 countdown.

== Track listing ==
CD-maxi
No.	Title	Length
1.	"Sick with Love" (radio mix)	3:44
2.	"Sick with Love" (video mix)	3:44
3.	"Sick with Love" (original album version)	4:13
4.	"Sick with Jungle" (I Hate You mix)	6:36
5.	"Turn Away" (Jungle mix)	6:06

== Charts ==
Chart (1997)	Peak position
Australia (ARIA)	21
