= Haydn Ross =

- Home and Away character
- Portrayed by: Andrew Hill
- Duration: 1990–1991, 1994, 1996
- First appearance: 31 October 1990
- Last appearance: 14 August 1996
- Introduced by: Des Monaghan (1990); Andrew Howie (1994); John Holmes (1996)
In-universe information
- Occupation: Student at Summer Bay High (1990–91)
- Father: Michael Ross
- Mother: Cynthia Ross
- Stepmother: Pippa Ross
- Brothers: Christopher Fletcher (adoptive)
- Sisters: Kate Ross
- Half-brothers: Dale Ross

Haydn Ross is a fictional character from the Australian Channel Seven soap opera Home and Away, played by Charlton Hill (known then as Andrew Hill) The character debuted on-screen during the episode airing on 31 October 1990 and departed on 17 September 1991. He returned in 1994 and 1996.

== Casting ==
Hill told Nigel May from Look-in that he won the role of Haydn by chance because agent made a mistake during the application process. Hill arrived at the Seven Network studios under the impression that he was auditioning for a washing powder commercial. When handed the scripts for Haydn, he was confused but carried on with the audition. Hill said that he impressed the casting department because he "remembered everything". In 1991, Hill decided to leave the series because the long filming hours had interfered with his studies. He planned to go to college and catch up on the work he had missed.

== Development ==
A columnist for TV Week said that when Haydn arrives in Summer Bay, he thinks it is a "hick town". Haydn is the son of Cynthia (Belinda Giblin) and Michael Ross (Dennis Coard). He benefited from his father's boating marina business by attending a private school. In their book Home and Away Annual Kesta Desmond and David Nicholls describe Haydn as being "athletic and determined like his father"; but like his mother too because he has a "love of culture and a comfortable lifestyle". Haydn used to like family life until his parents divorced. He could not accept the ramifications of Michael's failed business ventures and finds it hard to adjust to life outside of private school. His mother is no longer around when Haydn needs her and Michael is not in the position to take him on holidays. They added that a "lifetime of coddling" makes living in Summer Bay difficult for him. However, Haydn tries to accept his new "enforced lifestyle". Andrea Black writing in Home and Away – Official Collector’s Edition explained that the arrival of Haydn and Sophie Simpson (Rebekah Elmaloglou) "meant serious strife" in Summer Bay.

In the TV Week issue dated 29 December 1990, a reporter revealed that writers had planned a love triangle storyline for Haydn in early 1991. They previewed that Haydn would become "embroiled" in the story that also features Sophie and Blake Dean (Les Hill). During this time, producers also cast Belinda Giblin to play Haydn's mother and Michael's ex-wife, Cynthia Ross. A TV Week writer revealed that Cynthia would "turn up in Summer Bay to wreak havoc." Later that year, Haydn pretended to go missing in the bush in an attempt to reconcile his warring parents. Things did not go to plan when he fell down a mineshaft. Black said that Michael "raced to the rescue of his son". But Haydn "didn't stay long in the bay" and he then exited the show.

In the 25 September 1993 issue of TV Week, a reporter confirmed that Hill had agreed to reprise the role of Haydn after a year long break, in which he attended Sydney University. Hill signed up for a two-month guest stint and began filming on 6 December. Producers were keen to create "some on-screen heat" between Haydn and Finlay Roberts (Tina Thomsen), after learning Hill and Thomsen were in a relationship. Hill told a reporter from Inside Soap that Haydn returns because he feels it is the right time to rebuild his relationship with Michael. Ally Oliver from Inside Soap reported that Michael is "thrilled to see him back and more than ready to forgive his son for their troubled past together." He added that Haydn appears to have "grown up". But in addition to this, Haydn has also got himself "so deeply in debt from his gambling habits". Hill explained that Haydn is "not a bad guy". While he is "completely addicted" and "so wrapped up" with gambling, those around him "feel sorry for him more than anything else". Haydn needs all the help he can get but is not prepared to tell Michael the truth. He also forms a romance with Finlay.

Hill and Thomsen had begun an off-screen relationship together three years prior. Producers were inspired by their romance and decided that their character should enter into a relationship. Oliver said that producers "were taking a gamble" in case the actors fell out on set. But Thomsen told the writer that she and Hill were on set, they had made an effort to keep their personal lives separate from their work. She added that when they left the studios they would "give each other a big hug" and normality would resume. On-screen Finlay cannot resist Haydn's charms and they get together. Thomsen told Oliver that Haydn is "tall, handsome, he's sincere and he's nice to her – what more could a girl want?"

He later has a "fling" with Marilyn Chambers (Emily Symons) and producers later cast Melissa Bell to play Haydn's ex-girlfriend, Suzie Hudson, who is pregnant with his child.

== Storylines ==
Haydn arrives in Summer Bay shortly after his father; Michael separates from his mother, Cynthia. Haydn is enrolled at Summer Bay much to his displeasure as he has previously attended private school and on manages to upset Sophie by pointing out her literacy struggles and finds himself in argument with Blake. Haydn confides in teacher Grant Mitchell (Craig McLachlan) about his unhappiness about being forced to move by his father. Karen Dean (Belinda Jarrett), Blake's sister takes a liking to Haydn and makes her feeling clear but he rejects her. After a talk with Michael, Haydn begins to calm down.

When roles are cast for a year ten production of Romeo and Juliet, Haydn is cast opposite Sophie, who is dating Blake. Haydn relishes the chance to goad Blake about it at every opportunity. Sophie eventually realises she has feelings for Haydn and they kiss. Karen witnesses this and is hurt. Blake sees Sophie and Haydn kissing several weeks later and punches Haydn. They later resolve matters and become friends. Cynthia arrives in Summer Bay and Haydn tries to reunite his parents but when he realises that they will not get back together and Michael is in a relationship with Pippa Fletcher (Debra Lawrence), Haydn runs away and falls into a mineshaft and is missing for several days. He is eventually found and leaves to stay with Cynthia for several weeks. Haydn later stands as Michael's best man when he marries Pippa. Haydn and Sophie later break up and Haydn leaves after a disagreement with new principal Lois Crawford (Tina Bursill).

Haydn later returns to ask Michael and Pippa for a loan in order for him to set up a surf shop in the bay. This causes a rift between Michael and Pippa when Michael suggests remortgaging the caravan park in order to help Haydn. It soon becomes apparent that Haydn has a gambling problem which plays havoc with his relationship he has recently begun with Finlay. Finlay's mother Irene Roberts (Lynne McGranger) is opposed to the union but the couple continue. Haydn quickly slips back into his habit and begins betting again. Finlay discovers this and tries to help him through it but Haydn's resolve is weak and he flees after his horse loses and leaves notes for Michael and Finlay.

Following Michael's death, Haydn returns to the Bay for the funeral and Pippa is hostile to him and when he tries to save his conscience by returning half of the money he borrowed, Pippa initially refuses but eventually swallows her pride and accepts. After learning of Marilyn's failed engagement to Donald Fisher (Norman Coburn), Haydn takes an interest in Marilyn and they begin dating. This is only temporary as Haydn soon leaves to take a job on an oil rig but returns several months later to win Marilyn back when she resumes her relationship with Donald but she turns him down after she learns he has got another woman, Suzie Hudson, pregnant and he leaves again.

== Reception ==
A columnist for Inside Soap said that Haydn was the "prodigal" and "errant" son of Michael. They observed him as once being a "snooty" private schooled child who later grew up to be street wise. They added that viewers would not catch anyone hassling Haydn for being snooty in his latter appearances. While another said that Haydn was a "good boy gone bad".
