= Love Addiction (song) =

Single by Robyn Loau

from the album Malaria: The Lost Album
- Released: 1998
- Studio: Sun Studios, Sydney
- Genre: Electronic
- Length: 3:41
- Label: Polydor
- Songwriter(s): Anthony Copping; Robyn Loau; Fabian
- Producer(s): Anthony Copping

Robyn Loau singles chronology
"Sick with Love" (1997)	"Love Addiction" (1998)	"Got That Kinda Feelin' (Float On)" (1998)

"Love Addiction" is a song by Australian singer, songwriter, Robyn Loau. The song was released in April 1998 as the second single from Loau's debut studio album studio album, Malaria: The Lost Album (2008). The single peaked at number 66 on the ARIA Charts.

== Track listing ==
CD Maxi (571271-2)
No.	Title	Length
1.	"Love Addiction" (Radio mix)	3:41
2.	"Love Addiction" (Jungle mix)	4:15
3.	"Love Addiction" (Original UK mix)	4:20
4.	"Love Addiction" (Club Addiction mix)	6:20
5.	"Sick with Love" (Dub mix)	3:40

== Charts ==
Chart (1998)	Peak position
Australia (ARIA)	66
