= Robyn Loau =

Background information
- Born: 20 October 1972 (age 53); New Zealand
- Origin: Sydney, Australia
- Genre: Pop
- Years active: 1991–present
- Formerly of: Girlfriend
- Website: myspace.com/robynloau

Robyn Loau (/laʊ/; born 20 October 1972) is a New Zealand–born Australian singer, songwriter and actress, who is of Samoan descent From 1991 to 1994, she was lead singer of pop group Girlfriend, before leaving the group to become the face and voice of world music project Siva Pacifica. Loau launched her solo career in 1997 with the Adamski produced single "Sick with Love".

== Career ==
=== 1991–1994: Girlfriend ===
Robyn Loau first came into the spotlight as the lead singer of Australian all-girl pop group Girlfriend, with fellow vocalists Jacqui Cowell, Siobhánn Heidenreich, Lorinda Noble and Melanie Alexander. Their debut single, "Take It from Me", released in April 1992, peaked at #1 on the Australian ARIA singles chart. Two further Australian top 20 singles followed, with "Girl's Life" and "Without You", and the group's debut album, Make It Come True, was certified platinum.

Girlfriend's popularity helped launch their own range of clothing, available through Myer. The group achieved minor success in the UK, where "Take It from Me" and "Girl's Life" charted at #47 and #68, respectively.

"Heartbeat", the first single from the band's second album It's Up to You, was released in September 1993, coinciding with the Heartbeat Tour to promote the new material. The album was certified gold in Australia, and contained two top 50 singles, "Heartbeat" and the ballad "Wishing on the Same Star".

Loau left the band in mid-1994 to pursue a solo career. The four other members continued performing and renamed themselves GF4. However, the group disbanded in 1996 after two further singles.

=== 1995–1996: Siva Pacifica and acting ===
In 1996, Loau made her film debut in the David Caesar directed film Idiot Box.

Loau was the face and voice of the South Pacific project Siva Pacifica. Loau worked with producer Anthony Copping to arrange an album, capturing the voices of the native island people. After its completion, Loau travelled the world, introducing countries across Europe to the ancient music of the islands. The album, released in 1997, peaked in the top 50 in France.

=== 1997–2007: Solo artist ===
Lou's released her debut solo single "Sick with Love" in September 1997. It was written with and produced by Adamski and received heavy airplay on alternative radio station, Triple J. The song peaked at #21 on the Australian ARIA singles chart. Loau's second solo single, "Love Addiction" (featuring EMF singer James Atkin), peaked at #66 in Australia. Loau's debut album Malaria (recorded while working on the Siva Pacifica project) received a promotional release within Australia and was well received by Australian critics, drawing comparisons to Portishead and Neneh Cherry. In a four star review, Rolling Stone proclaimed Malaria "a wickedly classy solo debut". However, only weeks prior to the scheduled commercial release of the album, Loau was dropped by her label, PolyGram, during their merger with Universal Music, and the album was shelved.

In 1999, Loau featured in the film Somewhere in the Darkness.

The following years saw little music output from Loau, with the main exceptions being a cover of Duran Duran's "The Wild Boys" for the various artists Duran Duran tribute album UnDone in 1999, and Sydney Gay and Lesbian Mardi Gras theme "Never Miss the Water" in 2003.

In 2007, Loau released "She Devil". Who magazine compared it to Madonna's Ray of Light era. The single peaked at #83 on the ARIA singles chart, and #45 on the ARIA physical singles chart. It was top 5 on the AIR independent artist chart and was listed as the 29th highest selling indie single of 2007. "She Devil" was performed in Charlie's Bar on the TV soap opera Neighbours (airing 25 October 2007 in Australia, and 8 February 2008 in the UK).

Also in 2007, Loau covered The Korgis' track "Everybody's Got to Learn Sometime", which was used to promote the 2008 series of The Biggest Loser. It was released as a double A-side single with "Foreign Life", penned by Loau and Sven Tydeman.

=== 2008–present: Malaria and Only Human ===
In 2008, Loau released the double A-sided single "Everybody's Gotta Learn Sometime"/"Foreign Life". "Everybody's Gotta Learn Sometime" was featured as the theme for Network Ten's The Biggest Loser.

In July 2008, Loau's un-released 1998 debut album Malaria was released, titled Malaria: The Lost Album, featuring "Sick with Love" and "Love Addiction". The album combines the sounds of major cities Sydney and London with traditional instruments from the Pacific Islands. Many of the writing sessions for the album took place in the islands during the recording of world music project Siva Pacifica. The album was named after many of the recording crew were struck by the tropical disease. In August 2009, Loau released "Hard" which contained provocative lyrics exploring the Columbine shootings from the killer's point of view. "Never Let You Down" in October 2010.

In November 2010, Loau's second studio album Only Human was released. The album explores themes of redemption, sexuality, school bullying, infidelity and gun control. She collaborated with songwriters and producers including Josh Abrahams (Puretone), Future Sound of Melbourne, members of the Resin Dogs, Skin and Len Arran (Skunk Anansie).

In March 2012, Loau released a cover of "Wuthering Heights".

== Discography ==
=== Albums ===
Title	Album details
Malaria: The Lost Album	Release date: July 2008; Label: GoSet, Universal (GOSET010); Formats: CD, download
Only Human	Release date: November 2010; Label: Robyn Loau. GoSet, Universal (GOSET0111); Formats: CD, download

=== Singles ===
Title	Year	Peak positions	Album
Title	Year	AUS	Album
"Sick with Love"	1997	21	Malaria: The Lost Album
"Love Addiction"	1998	66	Malaria: The Lost Album
"Got That Kinda Feelin' (Float On)"	1998	115	Malaria: The Lost Album
"Never Miss the Water" (with Gerry DeVeaux, Shauna Jensen and Michal Nicolas)	2003	—	Sydney Gay & Lesbian Mardi Gras 2003
"She Devil"	2007	83	Only Human
"Everybody's Gotta Learn Sometime"/"Foreign Life"	2008	—	Only Human
"Hard" (with Josh Abrahams)	2009	—	Only Human
"Never Let You Down" (with Josh Abrahams)	2010	—	Only Human
"Wuthering Heights"	2012	—	Only Human
"—" denotes releases that did not chart or were not released.
