= Without You (Girlfriend song) =

Single by Girlfriend

from the album Make It Come True
- Released: 7 September 1992
- Studio: Sun (Sydney, Australia)
- Length: 3:52
- Label: BMG Australia
- Songwriter(s): Noel Macdonald; Cameron Tait; Justine Bradley; Robyn Loau
- Producer(s): Noel Macdonald

Girlfriend singles chronology
"Girl's Life" (1992)	"Without You" (1992)	"Bad Attitude" (1992)

"Without You" is a song by Australian group Girlfriend. The song was released in September 1992 as the third single from their debut studio album, Make It Come True. The song peaked at number 18 on the Australian Singles Chart.

== Track listing ==
BMG (74321115972)
No.	Title	Length
1.	"Without You" (radio mix)	3:52
2.	"Without You" (Without Drums mix)	3:51
3.	"Without You" (Moonlight mix)	3:51
4.	"Without You" (Karaoke)	3:49

== Charts ==
=== Weekly charts ===
Chart (1992)	Peak position
Australia (ARIA)	18

=== Year-end charts ===
Chart (1992)	Rank
Australia (ARIA)	70
