= Tina Thomsen =

Australian actress (born 1975)

- Born: 17 November 1975 (age 50); Copenhagen, Denmark
- Education: Clontarf Beach State High School
- Occupations: Actor, Director
- Years active: 1990–present
- Known for: Home and Away; Shark Bay

Tina Thomsen is a Danish-born Australian actress whose roles include Finlay Roberts in the soap opera Home and Away and Tanga on Farscape.

== Early life ==
Thomsen was born on 17 November 1975 in Copenhagen, Denmark. Her family migrated to Australia in 1982 and she grew up in Brisbane, Queensland. She attended Clontarf Beach State High School.

== Career ==
Thomsen joined Home and Away in 1991 as Irene Roberts’ daughter Finlay Roberts and remained on the series until 1994. She made guest returns in 1996 and 1997.

She had guest roles in long-running medical series' G.P. and All Saints, sci-fi series Farscape and drama series Big Sky. She also had a recurring role in Foxtel comedy/drama series Shark Bay in 1996, in which she reunited with her former Home and Away co-star Dieter Brummer.

Thomsen also co-hosted a 1993 episode of the Australian edition of Saturday Disney together with then boyfriend, actor and musician Charlton Hill and UK host, British actress Carmen Ejogo.

== Personal life ==
Thomsen lives in Redcliffe, Queensland with her family. She now spends her time teaching acting classes focussing on screen performance, with her business Zip Studios.

Thomsen dated her Home and Away co-star Charlton Hill (known at the time as Andrew Hill), who played her on-screen boyfriend Haydn Ross at the time.

== Filmography ==
=== As actor ===
Year	Title	Role	Notes
1991–1994, 1996–1997	Home and Away	Finlay Roberts	Seasons 4–7, 331 episodes (main role)
1991–1994, 1996–1997	Home and Away	Finlay Roberts	Seasons 9–10, 14 episodes (recurring)
1995	G.P.	Callie Butler	Season 7, episode 12
1996	Shark Bay	Debbie	Season 1, 26 episodes (main role)
1997	Big Sky	Jen	Season 1, episode 11
1998	All Saints	Cheryl	Season 1, episode 1
1999	Farscape	Tanga	Season 1, episode 6

=== As writer / director ===
Year	Title	Role	Notes
2018–2018	Forever Elle	Writer, director	Seasons 2–3 (19 episodes)
2018	Byte Size Bliss	Writer, director	Season 1 (10 episodes)
2019	Dis-placed	Writer, director	Season 1 (10 episodes)
