= Save Some Love =

Single by Keedy

from the album Chase the Clouds
- B-side: "Lazy Day"
- Released: May 13, 1991
- Genre: Dance-pop
- Length: 4:11
- Label: Arista
- Songwriter: Greg Gerard
- Producers: Michael Jay; Brian Malouf

Keedy singles chronology
"Save Some Love" (1991)	"Wishing on the Same Star" (1991)

Music videos
- "Save Some Love" on YouTube

"Save Some Love" is the debut single by American singer-songwriter Keedy. Written by Greg Gerard, the single was released by Arista Records on May 13, 1991. It reached No. 14 and 15 on the US Cash Box Top 100 and Billboard Hot 100 charts. The song, included on Keedy's debut and only album, Chase the Clouds (1991), represents her only hit song to date. The single was released in Japan as "Soyokaze no Kiss" (そよ風のキッス; lit. "A Kiss in the Breeze").

== Music video ==
The music video for "Save Some Love" was shot in LA at the Sepulveda dam in San Ferdinando Valley, California and was a two-day shoot. Keedy recalls:

"The director wanted it to be a take on the 1954 Fellini film La Strada......and it may seem crazy when you watch it but the day outside at the Sepulveda dam it was freezing cold. There is also a part where I'm roller-skating but you can't see my skates… J The zebra and camel had a little fight. Oh and the day before we started shooting I thought I would be really cool and go and get the longest red finger nails I could, when I walked in and the stylist saw them I thought she was going to faint. So it was a seriously nutty time just like the video."

The video is particularly memorable for the portrayal of early 1990s fashion.

== Track listing ==
US 7-inch vinyl/cassette single
No.	Title	Writer(s)	Producer	Length
1.	"Save Some Love"	Greg Gerard	Michael Jay	4:11
2.	"Lazy Day"	Keedy	Brian Malouf	3:51

US 12-inch vinyl single
No.	Title	Length
1.	"Save Some Love" (Extended Remix)	5:45
2.	"Save Some Love" (Hot Remix)	4:31
3.	"Save Some Love" (Single Version)	4:11

UK 12-inch vinyl single
No.	Title	Length
1.	"Save Some Love" (Extended Remix)	5:45
2.	"Save Some Love" (Hot Remix)	4:31
3.	"Lazy Day"	3:51

German CD single
No.	Title	Length
1.	"Save Some Love" (Single Version)	4:11
2.	"Save Some Love" (Extended Remix)	5:45
3.	"Save Some Love" (Hot Remix)	4:31
4.	"Lazy Day"	3:51

== Charts ==
=== Weekly charts ===
Chart (1991)	Peak position
Australia (ARIA)	145
Canada Top Singles (RPM)	58
US Billboard Hot 100	15
US Cash Box Top 100	14
