= Lincoln's Doctor's Dog =

Phrase in the publishing industry

Lincoln's Doctor's Dog is a trope of publishing, the title being the supposed guarantee for a best seller, because the most popular topics are Abraham Lincoln, doctors, and dogs. It is credited to Bennet Cerf. There are real instances of works with this title, including a story by Christopher Morley, the basis for a film in Screen Directors Playhouse.

In 1939, George Cooper Stevens published Lincoln's Doctor's Dog and Other Famous Best Sellers, which explored popular book trends of the era. In 2020, James O. Long wrote A satirical novel titled Lincoln's Doctor's Dog featuring a dog named Cooper as Lincoln's "knowing sidekick".
