= Lois Collier =

American actress (1919–1999)

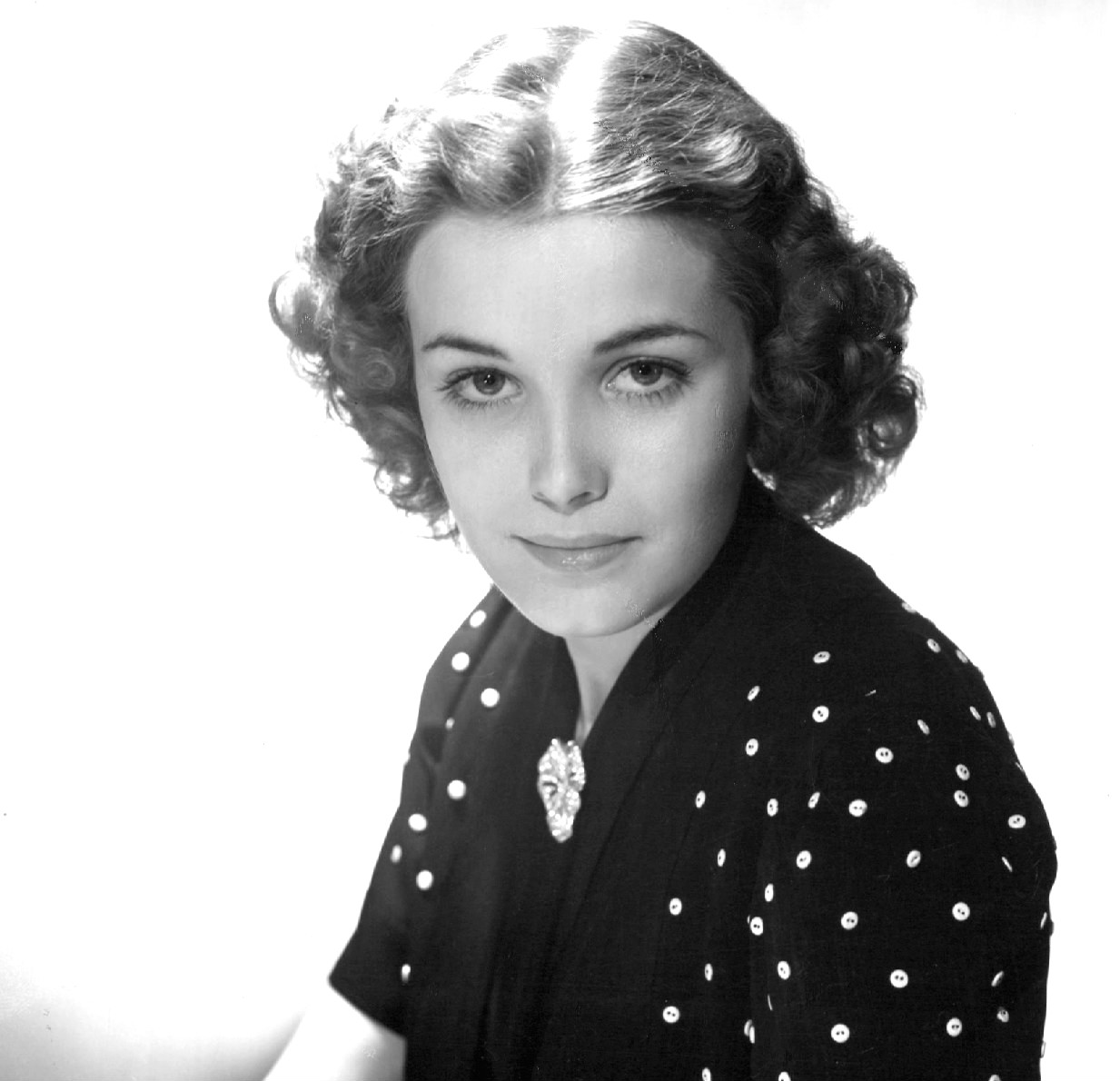
- Collier as the host of the CBS radio program Hollywood in Person, 1937
- Born: Madelyn Earle Jones; March 21, 1917; Salley, South Carolina, U.S.
- Died: October 27, 1999 (aged 82); Woodland Hills, Los Angeles, California, U.S.
- Resting place: Hollywood Forever Cemetery
- Other name: Lois Collyer
- Education: Limestone College
- Occupation: Actress
- Years active: 1938–1958
- Known for: A Night in Casablanca; Raiders of the Range; The Phantom Plainsmen; Boston Blackie
- Spouses: Robert A. Duncan (div. 1943) Robert Jackson Oakley (m. 1945; div. 1956) Paul Schreibman (m. 1957)

Lois Collier (born Madelyn Earle Jones; March 21, 1917 – October 27, 1999) was an American actress born in Salley, South Carolina. She was sometimes credited as Lois Collyer.

== Early years ==
Collier's father was Ernest Jones, a pharmacist, of Salley, South Carolina. Chaperoned by her grandmother, she visited Hollywood when she was 15, later describing herself as "movie-struck" at the time. She attended Limestone College in Gaffney, South Carolina.

== Film ==
Collier's acting career started as a model in the 1935 romance-comedy Women Must Dress. From 1940 through 1949, her career would be active and somewhat successful, with her playing mostly heroine roles in B-movies. Her best known film is probably A Night in Casablanca (1946) starring the Marx Brothers. During the 1940s, she often starred opposite western stars Bob Steele, Tom Tyler, and Dennis Moore. In 1950, she starred in the sci-fi serial The Flying Disc Man from Mars.

Collier was sometimes called the Fourth Mesquiteer because seven of Republic Pictures' The Three Mesquiteers movies featured her as the female lead.

== Radio ==
Collier played Carol in the soap opera Dear John, which ran on CBS in the 1930s and 1940s. Beginning December 6, 1948, she was featured in You, a program on KMGM in Los Angeles, California.

== Television ==
In 1949, Collier co-starred in City Desk, a drama about activity in the newsroom of a newspaper. From 1950 through 1957, she starred mostly on television series episodes. She played Mary, the hero's girlfriend and sidekick, in 58 episodes of the television series Boston Blackie, which ran from 1951 to 1954. She retired from acting after 1957.

== Personal life ==
Collier was married to bank executive Robert A. Duncan. She was granted a divorce from him on September 3, 1943. On August 4, 1945, Collier married Robert Jackson Oakley, an agent for actors. They divorced in 1956.

== Filmography ==
=== Film ===
- Women Must Dress (1935) – Model
- A Desperate Adventure, aka It Happened in Paris (UK) (1938) – Angela
- Girls of the Road (1940) – Road Girl (uncredited)
- Ice-Capades, aka Music in the Moonlight (US: reissue title) (1941) – Audition Girl (uncredited)
- Outlaws of Cherokee Trail (1941) – Doris Sheldon
- Sailors on Leave (1941) – Pretty Brunette (uncredited)
- Gauchos of El Dorado (1941) – Ellen
- West of Cimarron (1941) – Doris Conway
- Mr. District Attorney in the Carter Case (1941) – Receptionist (uncredited)
- Blondie Goes to College, aka The Boss Said 'No' (UK) (1942) – Coed (uncredited)
- A Tragedy at Midnight (1942) – (uncredited)
- The Man Who Returned to Life (1942) – Mary Tuller (uncredited)
- Yokel Boy (1942), aka Hitting the Headlines (UK) – Stewardess (uncredited)
- Raiders of the Range (1942) – Jean Travers
- The Affairs of Jimmy Valentine, aka Unforgotten Crime (US: TV title) (1942) – Receptionist
- The Courtship of Andy Hardy (1942) – Cynthia, Girl at the Dance (uncredited)
- Westward Ho (1942) – Anne Henderson
- The Phantom Plainsmen (1942) – Judy Barrett
- My Son, the Hero (1943) – Nancy Cavanaugh
- Santa Fe Scouts (1943) – Claire Robbins
- Get Going (1943) – Doris
- Young Ideas (1943) – Co-ed (uncredited)
- She's for Me (1943) – Eileen Crane
- Ladies Courageous (1944) – Jill
- Weird Woman (1944) – Margret Mercer
- Prices Unlimited (1944, Short)
- Follow the Boys (1944) – Herself (uncredited)
- Cobra Woman (1944) – Veeda
- Jungle Woman (1944) – Joan Fletcher
- Jungle Queen (1945, Serial) – Pamela Courtney
- The Naughty Nineties (1945) – Miss Caroline Jackson
- Penthouse Rhythm (1945) – Linda Reynolds, Junior's Secretary
- The Crimson Canary (1945) – Jean Walker
- Girl on the Spot (1946) – Kathy Lorenz
- A Night in Casablanca (1946) – Annette
- The Cat Creeps (1946) – Gay Elliott
- Wild Beauty (1946) – Linda Gibson
- Slave Girl (1947) – Aleta
- Arthur Takes Over (1948) – Margaret Bixby
- Out of the Storm (1948) – Ginny Powell
- Miss Mink of 1949 (1949) – Alice Forrester
- Joe Palooka in Humphrey Takes a Chance (1950) – Anne Howe Palooka
- Flying Disc Man from Mars (1950, Serial) – Helen Hall
- Rhythm Inn (1951) – Betty Parker

=== Television ===
- Dick Tracy – Fluff (4 episodes, 1950)
- Joe Palooka in Humphrey Takes a Chance (1950) – Anne Howe Palooka
- Rhythm Inn (1951) – Betty Parker
- The Unexpected – "Beyond Belief" (1952)
- Boston Blackie – Mary Wesley (58 episodes, 1951–1953)
- Letter to Loretta – "600 Seconds" (1955) (as Lois Collyer) Gloria Joy
- Cavalcade of America – "Sunrise on a Dirty Face" (1955) – Marion
- Damon Runyon Theater – "A Job for Macarone" (1955) – Mary Peering
- Cheyenne – "West of the River" (1956) – Ruth McKeever
- Screen Directors Playhouse – "The Sword of Villon" (1956) – Elaine
- It's a Great Life – "Operation for Earl" (1956) – Nurse
- Strange Stories (1 episode, 1956) – "Con Game" (1956)
- Broken Arrow (1 episode, 1957) – Johnny Flagstaff
- The George Burns and Gracie Allen Show
  - "Ronnie Gets an Agent" (1956) – Devlin's Secretary
  - "The Plumber's Union" (1957) – Julie Ames
- The Web (1 episode, 1957) – Easy Money (final appearance)
- Missile Monsters (1958) re-edited feature version of the 1950 serial Flying Disc Man from Mars
