= Penthouse Rhythm =

1945 film directed by Edward F. Cline

- Theatrical release poster
- Directed by: Edward F. Cline
- Screenplay by: Stanley Roberts; Howard Dimsdale
- Story by: Min Selvin; Stanley Roberts
- Produced by: Frank Gross
- Starring: Kirby Grant; Lois Collier; Edward Norris; Maxie Rosenbloom; Eric Blore; Minna Gombell; Edward Brophy
- Cinematography: William A. Sickner
- Edited by: Russell F. Schoengarth
- Production company: Universal Pictures
- Distributed by: Universal Pictures
- Release date: June 22, 1945
- Running time: 60 minutes
- Country: United States
- Language: English

Penthouse Rhythm is a 1945 American comedy film directed by Edward F. Cline and written by Stanley Roberts and Howard Dimsdale. The film stars Kirby Grant, Lois Collier, Edward Norris, Maxie Rosenbloom, Eric Blore, Minna Gombell and Edward Brophy. The film was released on June 22, 1945, by Universal Pictures.

== Cast ==
- Kirby Grant as Dick Ryan
- Lois Collier as Linda Reynolds
- Edward Norris as Charles Henry Holmes Jr.
- Maxie Rosenbloom as Maxie Rosenbloom
- Eric Blore as Ferdy Pelham
- Minna Gombell as Taffy
- Edward Brophy as Bailey
- Judy Clark as Patty Davis
- Marion Martin as Irma King
- Donald MacBride as Brewster
- Henry Armetta as Joe
- Jimmie Dodd as Hank Davis
- Bobby Worth as Johnny Davis
- Louis DaPron as Bill Davis
- George Lloyd as Nick Carson
- Paul Hurst as Police Desk Sergeant
- Harry Barris as Tim Noonan
- Fred Velasco as Dancer
- Lenee as Dancer
