= The Last Voices from Heaven =

The Last Voices From Heaven was a documentary series that was screened on the Australian Subscription Television National Geographic Channel carried by Foxtel, Optus Television and Austar, on Wednesday nights at 7:30 p.m. during 2004.

The series showed English music producer Anthony Copping and a single cameraman setting out on the adventure of his life to record an album of traditional Melanesian songs which he calls "the last voices from heaven". Travelling up the Mamberamo River in a dugout canoe, Anthony encountered much more than traditional music; he was threatened with spears and dragged into a heart-breaking medical emergency.

The series was nominated as the Most Outstanding Documentary Series at the 47th Annual TV Week Logie Awards on 1 May 2005.

An album was released in 2003 entitled Last Voices From Heaven. It is composed of mixes of the field recordings and of the music of Anthony Copping and Pascal Oritaimae.

== See also ==
- Siva Pacific
