= Siva Pacifica =

Siva Pacifica is a project by English-born Australian producer Anthony Copping.

== History ==
Copping's interest in the South Pacific stems back to a childhood obsession with New Guinea, reading about New Guinean tribes and dreamt of travelling through the jungle. In the late 1980s, Copping travelled to Fiji for a holiday and on a ferry trip to an outer island, Copping encountered a Fijian rugby team. "They had a guitar and started singing these songs and I couldn't believe how these massive, strapping, guys sang lullabies and produced these beautiful harmonies." He returned to Suva, looking for Fijian-made records and found none. He searched Sydney and realised that there was simply no South Pacific music available. "It was apparently an area of non-interest as far as music was concerned and that was my first twinkling of Siva."

In 1992, Copping produced some music for a West Papuan band, the Black Brothers. Over the next four years, Copping travelled and saved a collection of recordings and in 1997, the first Siva Pacifica album was released, selling over 100,000 copies. Robyn Loau, formerly of Australian band Girlfriend with whom Copping had worked, was face and voice of the project.

Copping said, "We really did something that no one had done before which was taking music from the South Pacific and releasing it very widely in Europe. For a non-English-speaking album it was an extraordinary event really. The French and Germans find that whole South Pacific area to be very unique and exotic."

In 2003, a 90-minute documentary directed by Steve Best and produced by Richard Campbell and Anthony Copping was released under the title Siva Pacifica: Lost Voices from Heaven. The documentary explores the more contemporary music of areas such as the Solomon Islands and West Papua to illustrate how the musical culture has developed. The concept for a documentary came after Copping had shot around fifty hours of Hi-8 footage while recording the album.

National Geographic called it "the most dangerous expedition in the history of music." The series aired in Australia on Foxtel in 2004 and was nominated for 'Most Outstanding Documentary Series' at the Logie Awards of 2005.

== Albums ==
List of albums, with selected details and chart positions
Title	album details	Peak chart positions	
Title	album details	AUS	FRA
Les Chants Du Pacifique / Los Cantos Del Pacifico	Release date: 1997; Label: Virgin (8446762); Formats: CD	90	42
Last Voices from Heaven	Release date: 2003; Label: Columbia (517308 2); Format: CD	—	—
