= Love's on My Mind =

Single by Girlfriend

from the album Make It Come True
- Released: March 1993
- Recorded: 1992
- Genre: Synth-pop
- Length: 3:46
- Label: BMG Australia
- Songwriters: Noel Macdonald; Justine Bradley
- Producer: Noel Macdonald

Girlfriend singles chronology
"Bad Attitude" (1992)	"Love's on My Mind" (1993)	"Heartbeat" (1993)

"Love's on My Mind" is a song recorded by Australian group Girlfriend. The song was released in March 1993 as the fifth and final single from their debut studio album Make It Come True. The song peaked at number 65 on the ARIA singles chart in April 1993, and spent seven weeks in the top 100.

== Track listing ==
BMG (74321140864)
No.	Title	Length
1.	"Love's on My Mind" (Single version)	3:46
2.	"What Kind of Girl" (Dance remix)	7:25
3.	"What Kind of Girl" (Karaoke)	3:27
4.	"Love's on My Mind" (Karaoke)	4:15

== Charts ==
Chart (1993)	Peak position
Australia (ARIA)	65
