= The Sword of Villon =

- Screen Directors Playhouse episode
- Episode no.: Season 1 Episode 22
- Directed by: George Waggner
- Written by: Wilbur S. Peacock
- Production code: Hal Roach Studios
- Original air date: 4 April 1956

Guest appearances
- Errol Flynn; Hillary Brooke; Pamela Duncan

"The Sword of Villon" is a 1956 American TV episode of the Screen Directors Playhouse series. Errol Flynn played Francois Villon.

== Plot ==
Francois Villon learns of a plot to assassinate the king, and gathers his followers to stop the plot and save the king's life.

== Cast ==
- Errol Flynn as Francois Villon
- Hillary Brooke as Countess
- Pamela Duncan as Velvet
- Murvyn Vye as Bagot
- Lois Collier as Lady Elaine
- Mark Dana as Count
- Richard Avonde as 1st. Bully
- Sol Gorss as 2nd. Bully
- Nesdon Booth as Tavernkeeper

== Production ==
The show was a collaboration between the Screen Directors Guild, the Hal Roach Studios and the J Walter Thompson advertising agency. In January 1956 the Screen Directors Playhouse announced they had signed Errol Flynn to play Francois Villon and it would be directed by Don Weis.

Flynn made it just prior to his own show The Errol Flynn Theatre.

== Reception ==
Filmink magazine later wrote the episode was "more of interest as a curiosity piece than anything else but it’s not awful by any means and Errol seems engaged. The concept was actually strong enough to support a feature film."
