= It's Up to You (album) =

Studio album by Girlfriend
- Released: 25 October 1993 (Australia)
- Recorded: 1993
- Studio: Sun Studios Sydney, The Enterprise L.A.
- Genre: Pop, dance pop
- Label: BMG Australia; Arista (Europe)
- Producer: Noel Macdonald

Girlfriend chronology
Make It Come True (1992)	It's Up to You (1993)

Singles from It's Up to You
- 1. "Heartbeat" Released: 6 September 1993; 2. "Wishing On The Same Star" Released: 22 November 1993

It's Up to You is the second and final studio album by Australian girl group Girlfriend. The album was released in October 1993 and peaked at number 29 on the ARIA chart. The album was certified gold.

At the ARIA Music Awards of 1994, Girlfriend were nominated for Best Pop Release, losing out to Peter Andre by Peter Andre.

== Track listing ==
No.	Title	Writer(s)	Length
1.	"Heartbeat"	Noel Macdonald, Lori Barth, Bob Leatherbarrow, Robyn Loau
2.	"Just a Girl"	Noel Macdonald, Cameron Tait & Robyn Loau
3.	"Wishing on the Same Star"	Diane Warren	4:05
4.	"I Love This World"	George Robert Merrill & Shannon Rubicam
5.	"Upside"	Pam Reswick & Steve Werfel
6.	"Our Love, This Love"	Noel Macdonald, Rick Price & Melanie Alexander
7.	"Get It Done"	Noel Macdonald, Cameron Tait & Robyn Loau
8.	"I Wanna Be Your Friend"	Noel Macdonald
9.	"Saving It Up"	James Roche
10.	"Individual"	Noel Macdonald & Jen Forbes

== Charts ==
Chart (1993–1994)	Peak position
Australian Albums (ARIA)	29

== Certifications ==
Region	Certification	Certified units/sales
Australia (ARIA)	Gold	35,000^{^}
^{^} Shipments figures based on certification alone.
