= Wishing on the Same Star =

1991 single by Keedy

Single by Keedy

from the album Chase the Clouds
- B-side: "Gettin' Around"
- Released: 1991
- Genre: Pop
- Length: 3:48
- Label: Arista
- Songwriter(s): Diane Warren
- Producer(s): Claude Gaudette; Greg Gerard

Keedy singles chronology
"Save Some Love" (1991)	"Wishing on the Same Star" (1991)

"Wishing on the Same Star" is the second and final single by American singer-songwriter Keedy. Written by Diane Warren, the single was released in 1991 by Arista Records. It peaked at number 86 on the Billboard Hot 100; a second push was made to American pop stations in 1992, but it failed to chart. The single was released in Japan as "Itsumo Futari de" (いつもふたりで; lit. "Always the Two of Us").

== Track listing ==
U.S. 7-inch vinyl/cassette single
No.	Title	Writer(s)	Length
1.	"Wishing on the Same Star"	Diane Warren	3:48
2.	"Gettin' Around"	Greg Gerard; Keedy	4:33

== Charts ==
Chart (1991)	Peak position
U.S. Billboard Hot 100	86

== Girlfriend version ==
"Wishing on the Same Star"

Single by Girlfriend

from the album It's Up to You
- B-side: "Triangle of Love"
- Released: 22 November 1993
- Studio: Sun (Sydney, Australia)
- Length: 4:05
- Label: BMG Australia
- Songwriter(s): Diane Warren
- Producer(s): Noel Macdonald

Girlfriend singles chronology
"Heartbeat" (1993)	"Wishing on the Same Star" (1993)	"Sooner or Later" (as GF4) (1994)

Australian all-female pop group Girlfriend covered "Wishing on the Same Star" for their second studio album, It's Up to You. Released by BMG Australia in November 1993, it peaked at number 44 on the Australian Singles Chart. It was the group's last single release in Australia before the departure of Robyn Loau.

=== Track listing ===
BMG (74321178712)
No.	Title	Writer(s)	Producer(s)	Length
1.	"Wishing on the Same Star" (Radio mix)	Diane Warren	Noel McDonald; Anthony Copping; Cheryl Webb; Peter Contini	4:05
2.	"Triangle of Love"	Daisuke Asai; Ryo Okumoto; Achilles; C. Damigos	Kouichi Murakami; Hitoshi Shishido; McDonald	4:38
3.	"Wishing on the Same Star" (Karaoke)			3:57

=== Charts ===
Chart (1994)	Peak position
Australia (ARIA)	44

== Namie Amuro version ==
"Wishing on the Same Star"

Single by Namie Amuro

from the album Style
- Language: Japanese
- B-side: "Did U"
- Released: September 11, 2002
- Recorded: 2002
- Studio: On Air Azabu Studio
- Genre: J-pop
- Length: 4:55
- Label: Avex Trax
- Composer(s): Diane Warren
- Lyricist(s): Diane Warren; kenko-p
- Producer(s): Masaki Iehara; Cobra Endo

Namie Amuro singles chronology
"I Will" (2002)	"Wishing on the Same Star" (2002)	"Shine More" (2003)

Japanese singer-songwriter Namie Amuro covered "Wishing on the Same Star" as her 21st single, released by Avex Trax on September 11, 2002. It was used as the theme song of the 2002 film Inochi. The song was meant to be her last before a hiatus that would have seen her transplanting herself from Tokyo to New York City for the purposes of artist development. As the last of her singles as a pop artist, it is the most commercially successful from the 2003 album Style. Amuro performed the song on the 53rd Kōhaku Uta Gassen.

The single peaked at No. 2 on Oricon's singles chart and sold over 97,000 copies. It was certified Gold by the RIAJ in December 2003.

=== Track listing ===
CD single
No.	Title	Lyrics	Music	Arrangement	Length
1.	"Wishing on the Same Star"	Diane Warren; kenko-p	Warren	Masaki Iehara	4:55
2.	"Did U"	Namie Amuro	A.Mazza-Sundafu; K-A.Ramen	Cobra Endo	3:57
3.	"Wishing on the Same Star" (Instrumental)				4:56
4.	"Did U" (Instrumental)				3:56

=== Personnel ===
- Namie Amuro – vocals, background vocals
- Kareb James – background vocals
- Yuko Kawai – background vocals
- Muriyama-Kiriyama Strings – strings

=== Production ===
- Producers – Masaki Iehara, Cobra Endo
- Arrangement – Masaki Iehara, Cobra Endo
- Strings arrangement – Tatsuya Murayama
- Mixing – Koji Morimoto, Rob Chiarelli
- Mixing assistant – Sang Park
- Instrument programming – David L. Huff, Cobra Endo
- Vocal direction – Mayumi Harada
- Music video director – Ugichin
- Choreographer – Warner

=== Charts ===
Chart (2002)	Peak position
Japanese Oricon Singles Chart	2

=== Certification ===
Region	Certification	Certified units/sales
Japan (RIAJ)	Gold	100,000^{^}
^{^} Shipments figures based on certification alone.

== Other versions ==
The song has been covered by several other artists, most notably by Puerto Rican singer Chayanne as "Mi Primer Amor" (1992), which peaked at number 8 on the Billboard Hot Latin Tracks., American dance singer Judy Cheeks (1995), German Eurodance group DJ Company (1997) and by American singer Myra (2001). In 1997, Diane Warren released a promotional compilation of songs written by her titled A Passion For Music. Included on the track list is the original demo of the song, sung by Susie Benson. In Brazil by Sandy & Junior in the Portuguese version "A Estrela Que Mais Brilhar".
