= Heartbeat (Girlfriend song) =

1993 single by Girlfriend

Single by Girlfriend

from the album It's Up to You
- Released: 6 September 1993
- Length: 3:46
- Label: BMG Australia
- Songwriter(s): Noel Macdonald; Lori Barth; Bob Leatherbarrow; Robyn Loau
- Producer(s): Noel Macdonald

Girlfriend singles chronology
"Love's on My Mind" (1993)	"Heartbeat" (1993)	"Wishing on the Same Star" (1993)

"Heartbeat" is a song by Australian group Girlfriend. The song was released in September 1993 as the lead single from their second studio album, It's Up to You. The song peaked at number 36 on the Australian Singles Chart.

== Track listing ==
Australian CD single
No.	Title	Length
1.	"Heartbeat" (radio mix)
2.	"Heartbeat" (extended Celebrate mix)
3.	"Heartbeat" (Vocals and Stuff mix)
4.	"Heartbeat" (karaoke mix)

== Charts ==
Chart (1993)	Peak position
Australia (ARIA)	36
