= Make It Come True =

Studio album by Girlfriend
- Released: 21 September 1992 (Australia)
- Recorded: 1992
- Genre: Pop, dance pop
- Length: 41:51
- Label: BMG Australia; Arista (Europe)
- Producer: Noel Macdonald

Girlfriend chronology
Make It Come True (1992)	It's Up to You (1993)

Singles from Make It Come True
- 1. "Take It From Me" Released: April 1992; 2. "Girl's Life" Released: 13 July 1992; 3. "Without You" Released: 7 September 1992; 4. "Bad Attitude" Released: December 1992; 5. "Love's on My Mind" Released: March 1993

Make It Come True is the debut album released by Australian girl band Girlfriend. The album was released in September 1992 and peaked at number 6 on the ARIA chart. The album was certified platinum.

At the ARIA Music Awards of 1993, Girlfriend were nominated for Best New Talent, losing out to Things of Stone and Wood.

== Track listing ==
No.	Title	Writer(s)	Length
1.	"Girl's Life"	Pam Reswick, Steve Werfel, Claude Gaudette, Doug Lambert	4:01
2.	"Take It From Me"	Noel Macdonald, Jamie Muhoberac, Justine Bradley, Rick Price	3:28
3.	"Without You"	Noel Macdonald, Cameron Tait, Bradley, Robyn Loau	3:47
4.	"All or Nothing"	George Merrill, Shannon Rubicam	3:46
5.	"Go For It"	Noel Macdonald, Cameron Tait	3:44
6.	"What Kinda Girl"	Bob Leatherbarrow, Noel Macdonald, Lori Barth, Jamie Muhoberac	3:24
7.	"Promises"	Noel Macdonald	4:32
8.	"Skating On Thin Ice"	Noel Macdonald, Dannielle Gaha	3:25
9.	"Love's on My Mind"	Noel Macdonald, Justine Bradley	3:43
10.	"Bad Attitude"	Steve Kipner, Paul Bliss, Noel Macdonald, Lori Barth	4:00

== Charts ==
=== Weekly charts ===
Chart (1992–1993)	Peak position
Australian Albums (ARIA)	6

=== Year-end charts ===
Chart (1992)	Position
Australian Albums (ARIA)	43
Australian Artist Albums (ARIA)	12

== Certifications ==
Region	Certification	Certified units/sales
Australia (ARIA)	Platinum	70,000^{^}
^{^} Shipments figures based on certification alone.
