= Out of the Storm (1948 film) =

1948 film by R. G. Springsteen

- Theatrical release poster
- Directed by: R. G. Springsteen
- Screenplay by: John K. Butler
- Story by: Gordon Rigby
- Produced by: Sidney Picker
- Starring: Jimmy Lydon; Lois Collier; Marc Lawrence; Richard Travis; Robert Emmett Keane; Helen Wallace
- Cinematography: John MacBurnie
- Edited by: Richard L. Van Enger
- Production company: Republic Pictures
- Distributed by: Republic Pictures
- Release date: September 11, 1948
- Running time: 61 minutes
- Country: United States
- Language: English

Out of the Storm is a 1948 American crime film directed by R. G. Springsteen and written by John K. Butler. The film stars Jimmy Lydon, Lois Collier, Marc Lawrence, Richard Travis, Robert Emmett Keane and Helen Wallace. The film was released on September 11, 1948 by Republic Pictures.

== Cast ==
- Jimmy Lydon as Donald Lewis
- Lois Collier as Ginny Powell
- Marc Lawrence as Red Stubbins
- Richard Travis as R.J. Ramsey
- Robert Emmett Keane as Holbrook
- Helen Wallace as Martha Lewis
- Harry Hayden as Chief Ryan
- Roy Barcroft as Arty Sorenson
- Charles Lane as Mr. Evans
- Iris Adrian as Ginger
- Byron Foulger as Al Weinstock
- Claire Du Brey as Mrs. Smith
- Smoki Whitfield as Maintenance Man
- Charles Sullivan as Plant Guard
- Rex Lease as Gus Clute
- Edgar Dearing as Ed Purcell
