= Keedy =

American singer

- Born: Kelly Ann Keedy; July 26, 1965 (age 60); Abilene, Texas, U.S.
- Origin: Milwaukee, Wisconsin, U.S.
- Genres: Pop
- Occupations: Singer–songwriter
- Labels: Arista Records (1991)

Kelly Ann Keedy Ladwig (born July 26, 1965), known by the stage name Keedy, is an American freestyle singer-songwriter best known for the 1991 Billboard Hot 100 top 20 hit, "Save Some Love", from her only major label studio album Chase the Clouds.

== Early life ==
Born in Abilene, Texas, Keedy grew up in Milwaukee, Wisconsin. Her father worked for the United States Postal Service. She has a younger brother. Ladwig graduated from Kings High School located in Kings Mills, Ohio in 1983 and studied music at College of Mount St. Joseph earning a Bachelor of Arts in Music in 1988.

== Career ==
In the mid-to late 1980s, Keedy was one of the lead singers of the Milwaukee club and dance music band, Gerard. The band, co-founded by Greg Gerard, was known for its rotation of lead singers that included Eric Benét (who later signed with EMI) and his sister Lisa. In 1989, Keedy and Greg Gerard were married (they later divorced). That same year, the couple signed a publishing deal with Geffen Records. In February 1990, Keedy was signed Arista Records. Her debut album, Chase the Clouds, was released in March 1991 to mixed but mainly positive reviews. The album's first single, "Save Some Love", became a top 20 hit, peaking at No. 15 on the Billboard Hot 100 chart. To promote the album, Keedy toured Japan and Europe and opened for Michael Bolton during the Milwaukee Summerfest.

The album's second single, "Wishing on the Same Star", was less successful, peaking at No. 86 on the Hot 100. Due to management changes at Arista, promotional support for the single was pulled, and no other singles from the album were released. For a time, Keedy remained at Arista and attempted to work on a second record, but continuing management shifts eventually led to the project being shelved. She was released by the record label soon after. Keedy then moved back to Wisconsin and continued making music. In the mid-1990s, she joined a local cover band, The Orphans. After leaving the band in May 1996, Keedy worked on music with then husband, guitarist Royce Hall of The Mosleys. They later published new music on MySpace between 2007 and 2008.

== Discography ==
=== Studio albums ===
- Chase the Clouds (1991)

=== Singles ===
- "Save Some Love" (1991)
- "Wishing on the Same Star" (1991)
