= The Cat Creeps (1946 film) =

1946 film

- Directed by: Erle C. Kenton
- Screenplay by: Edward Dein; Jerry Warner; Gertrude Walker
- Story by: Gerald Geraghty
- Starring: Noah Beery Jr.; Lois Collier; Paul Kelly; Fred Brady
- Cinematography: George Robinson; Elwood Bredell
- Edited by: Russell Schoengarth
- Music by: Paul Sawtell (uncredited)
- Production company: Universal Pictures
- Distributed by: Universal Pictures
- Release date: May 17, 1946
- Running time: 58 minutes
- Country: United States
- Language: English

The Cat Creeps is a 1946 American film directed by Erle C. Kenton and starring Noah Beery Jr., Lois Collier, and Paul Kelly. It follows a journalist and his photographer who attempt to research an unsolved death and locate a missing fortune, with the help of a black cat that appears to be possessed by the spirit of a dead woman.

== Plot ==
Journalist Terry Nichols is hired by his boss, Sampler, to research a mysterious letter received by the Morning Chronicle from a Cora Williams, who writes that she discovered a $200,000 fortune and considers it proof of Eric Goran's murder, which was ruled a suicide fifteen years prior. Cora's relative, Walter Elliott, once a suspect in Eric's murder, is now running for the United States senate against Sampler's brother-in-law.

Terry is hesitant to take the job due to the fact that he is dating Walter's daughter, Gay, but agrees. Upon interviewing him, Walter insists to Terry that he had nothing to do with Eric's death, and afterward contacts his lawyer, Tom McGalvey, who suggests hiring detective Ken Grady, who investigated Eric's death before. Terry and his photographer, Pidge, stowaway on a boat to a remote island to visit Cora's mansion where the Elliots, Tom, and Tom's assistant Connie, have convened.

In the mansion, Terry and Pidge find Cora unconscious, alone with her black cat in the room. Gay attempts to reach a doctor but finds the boat they traveled on has caught fire, leaving them all stranded. Connie and Ken overhear a semi-conscious Cora mention money stored in a "little house." Connie, who suffers from ailurophobia, faints when she sees Cora's cat, and moments later, Cora dies. Ken questions everyone in the house, but the meeting is interrupted by the arrival of Kyra, Eric Goran's daughter, who claims she has arrived to confront Cora about her father's death.

Gay discovers Ken's business card with Cora's last words written on them. While attempting to compare the card's handwriting to Connie's, she is bludgeoned from behind. Shortly after, Connie, fearful she is a suspect in Cora's death, begins to make a confession before fleeing. She is discovered dead by Terry moments later. When Gay regains consciousness, she finds the card has disappeared, only for Ken to admit that he took it.

Terry covertly plants a thousand dollar bill near Cora's cat, staging the scene as though the cat has discovered the money. Kyra falls for the plot, and suggests the feline may be possessed by Cora and able help them locate the fortune. The group separate, each in search of the "little house" mentioned by Cora. Gay enters the basement in search of a dollhouse she owned as a child. As Ken descends the stairs to the basement behind her, an unknown assailant trips him, causing him to be impaled to death on a rake. The group suspect Walter of the crime. After they all leave the basement, the cat remains hovering above the dollhouse.

Terry subsequently finds Tom searching through the dollhouse for the money, and a fight breaks out between them. Tom eventually relents and confesses to having fronted a bootlegging operation with Eric years prior, which was run out of Cora's mansion. Seeking to abscond with the profits earned by the illegal business, Tom murdered Eric and staged his death as a suicide, but was unable to locate the cache of money, which Eric had hidden on the island. Ken and Connie, who had discovered Tom's murderous plot, subsequently blackmailed him. Terry proceeds to admit that Kyra is in fact not Eric's daughter, but an actress whom he hired to pressure the murderer in the hopes of revealing their identity. Shortly after, Pidge discovers the fortune hidden inside a birdhouse outside Cora's bedroom window.

== Cast ==
- Noah Beery Jr. as Pidge "Flash" Laurie
- Lois Collier as Gay Elliot
- Paul Kelly as Ken Grady
- Fred Brady as Terry Nichols
- Douglass Dumbrille as Tom McGalvey
- Rose Hobart as Connie Palmer
- Jonathan Hale as Walter Elliot
- Iris Clive as Kyra Goran
- Vera Lewis as Cora Williams

== Style ==
The authors of the book Universal Horrors noted that by the mid-1940s the popularity of horror films was apparently waning, noting that Universal kept making them despite the fact that their major stars Boris Karloff and Bela Lugosi had left the company and other players such as Lionel Atwill, George Zucco and John Carradine had also left. Retrospective sources such Hal Erickson stated that, despite the film being promoted as a "typical Universal horror film," it was "more of a crime melodrama". The authors of Universal Horrors described the film as a "horror-whodunnit".

Film scholar Michael Pitts describes The Cat Creeps as a reworking of Universal's 1941 film Horror Island.

== Production ==
The Cat Creeps went into production on January 3, 1946. George Robinson was the director of photography but was replaced by an uncredited Elwood Bredell towards the later stages of filming. The crew of the film were advised by censors not to include the word "Witch" in the film as "there can be no possible confusion with the unacceptable word 'bitch'" and to avoid scenes of cruelty to the titular cat in the film. The film completed production in 13 days, one day over schedule.

== Release ==
The Cat Creeps was distributed theatrically by Universal Pictures on May 17, 1946. The film was double billed with She-Wolf of London. The film is still under copyright because the copyright was renewed in 1973.

=== Critical reception ===
From contemporary reviews, Jack D. Grant of The Hollywood Reporter found the film was "exactly what the tight-knitted mystery subject deserved. Nor are faults to be found with the casting or the suspenseful direction of the practiced Erle C. Kenton". Bosley Crowther of The New York Times stated the film was "a routine little thriller, with feeble attempts at comedy" and that "the cat gives a pretty good performance but it gets mediocre support". Wanda Hale of The New York Daily News declared the film as "the least effective murder mystery that has been made in years" stating that the film "has the appearance of having been thrown together in about the same length of time" and that "the performances, if possible, are worse than the production". Otis L. Guernsey Jr. of the New York Herald Tribune found that "there is nothing either frightening or mysterious about the law-breaking in The Cat Creeps, and it is not quite silly enough to be laughable".

From retrospective reviews, Hal Erickson of AllMovie described the film as "not a particularly distinguished [ crime melodrama]...Though blessed with an unusually strong supporting cast, The Cat Creeps is strictly B material". The authors of Universal Horrors commented that the film was "forgettable" noting that "even today, the mention of the title prompts horror buffs to think instantly of the 1930 The Cat Creeps – a lost film which few if any of them have ever seen". In 1962, Joe Dante included the film in his list of worst horror films list in Famous Monsters. Dante stated the film was "shamefully un-mysterious mystery with supernatural overtones. Just another grade B murder-in-the-mansion potboiler".

=== Home media ===
Vinegar Syndrome, in association with Universal Pictures Home Entertainment, released the film on Blu-ray through their Vinegar Syndrome Labs sub-label on April 25, 2023.

== Sources ==
- Dante, Joe Jr. (July 1962). "Dante's Inferno". Famous Monsters. Vol. 4, no. 3. Central Publications, Inc.
- Erickson, Hal. "The Cat Creeps (1946) - Erle C. Kenton | Synopsis, Characteristics, Moods, Themes and Related". AllMovie. Archived from the original on May 30, 2013.
- Pitts, Michael R. (2018). Thrills Untapped: Neglected Horror, Science Fiction and Fantasy Films, 1928-1936. Jefferson, North Carolina: McFarland. ISBN 978-1-476-63289-6.
- Weaver, Tom; Brunas, Michael; Brunas, John (2007) [1990]. Universal Horrors (2 ed.). Jefferson, North Carolina: McFarland. ISBN 978-0-7864-2974-5.
