= King George's Hall, Blackburn =

Entertainment venue and register office in England

Coordinates: 53.7492°N 2.4861°W

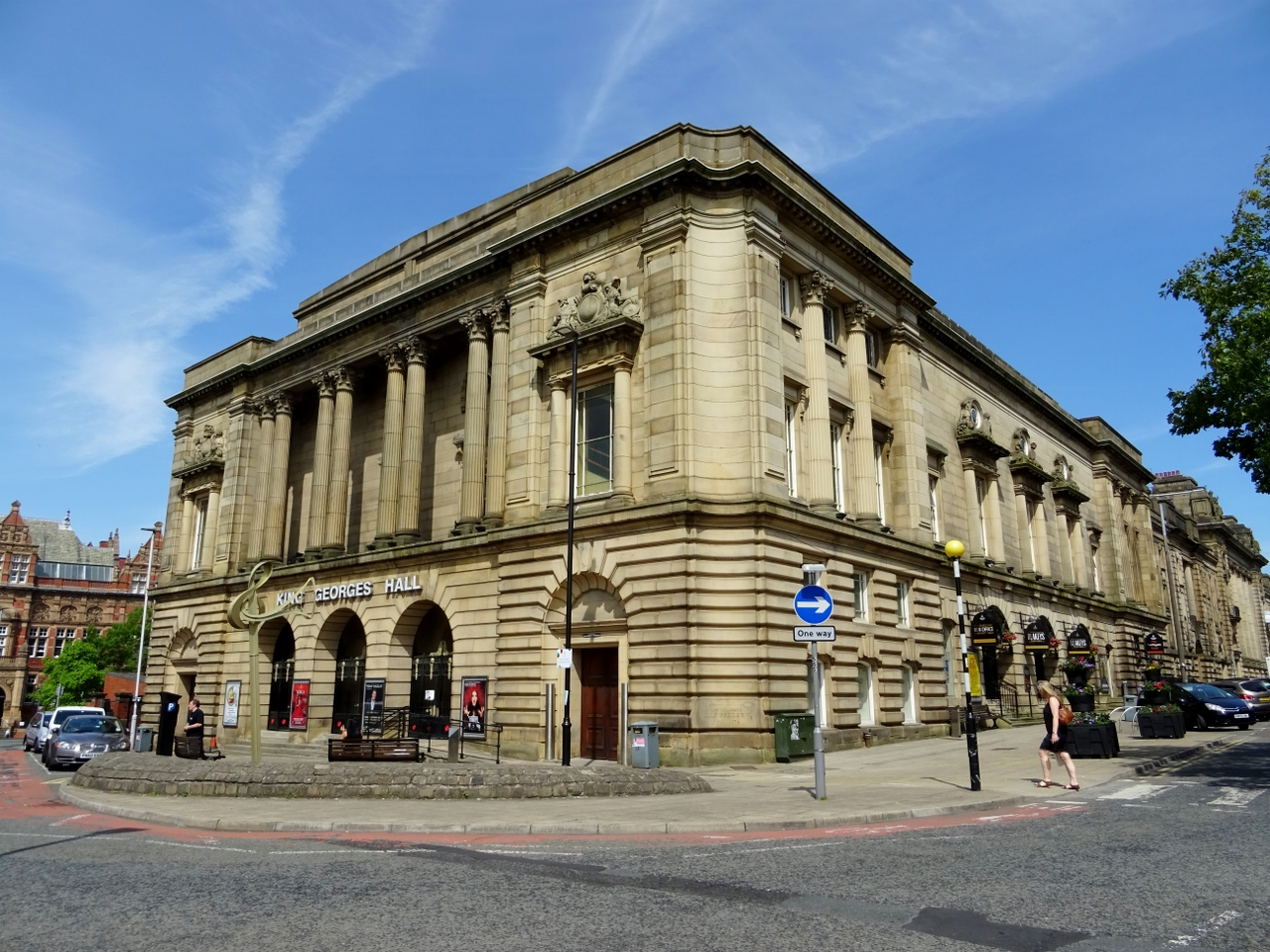
King George's Hall

King George's Hall is a performance venue located on Northgate in Blackburn, Lancashire, England.

It contains three halls: the Concert Hall, seating up to 1800; the Windsor Suite (capacity 750), and Blakey's Cafe Bar (capacity 500). It is also the location of Blackburn register office. It is operated by Blackburn with Darwen Borough Council.

Designed by architects Briggs, Wolstenholme & Thornely, construction of the hall began in 1913, but was interrupted by the First World War. It was officially opened in October 1921, and was extensively renovated in 1994. It is a Grade II listed building.

Among the artists who have appeared there are David Bowie (Ziggy Stardust Tour, 1973) and Queen, also on 1973 during their support act with Mott The Hoople.
