= William R. Cox =

American novelist

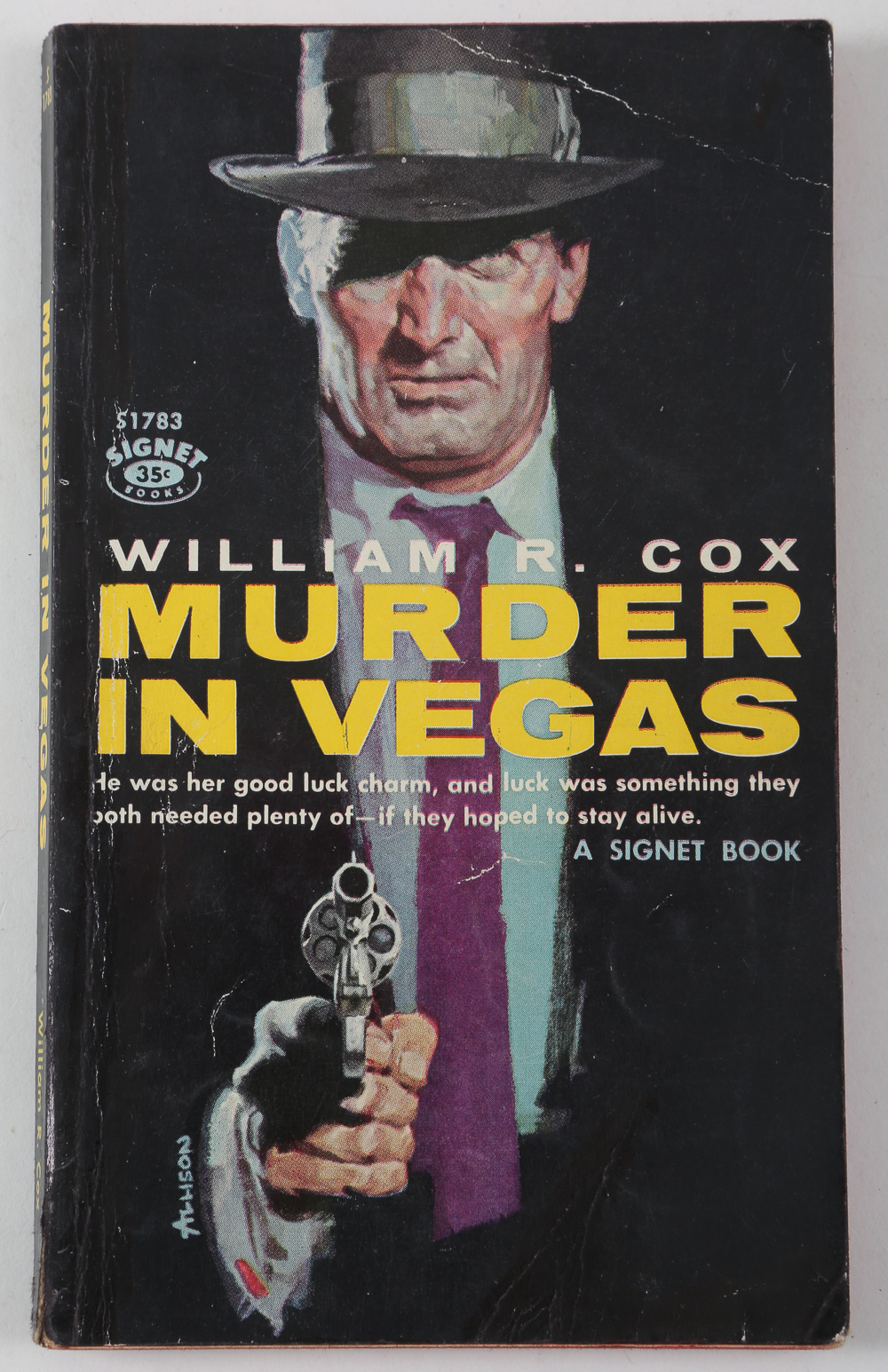

William Robert Cox (March 14, 1901 – July 7, 1988) was an American writer. He was a prolific writer of short stories and Western and Mystery novels mainly for the pulp and paperback markets. He wrote under at least six pseudonyms: Willard d'Arcy, Mike Frederic, John Parkhill, Joel Reeve, Roger G. Spellman and Jonas Ward.

He was born in Peapack-Gladstone, New Jersey. According to his widow, Casey Collins Cox, he was writing his 81st novel, Cemetery Jones and the Tombstone Wars on the day of his death at age 87 in 1988.
