= Werle (surname) =

Werle is a German language surname. It stems from the male given name Werner. Notable people with the surname include:

- Barbara Werle (1928–2013), American actress, dancer and singer
- Bill Werle (1920–2010), American baseball player
- Donyale Werle, American scenic designer
- François Werlé (1763–1811), French commander of the Napoleonic Wars
- Jan Werle (1984), Dutch chess grandmaster
- Lars Johan Werle (1926–2001), Swedish modernist composer
- Wolfgang Werlé, German convicted of murder
