= Dead to the World (film) =

- Directed by: Ross Gibson
- Written by: Ross Gibson
- Produced by: John Cruthers
- Starring: Lynette Curran; Paul Goddard; John Doyle; Charlton Hill
- Production company: Huzzah Productions
- Release date: 1991
- Country: Australia
- Language: English
- Budget: A$840,000

Dead to the World is a 1991 Australian film.

It premiered at the 1991 Melbourne International Film Festival.

== Plot ==
The owner of an inner city boxing gym and her troupe of boxers band together to fight developers.

== Cast ==
- Lynette Curran as Pearl Elkington
- Paul Goddard as Bobby
- John Doyle as Mr. Keats
- Charlton Hill as Young Drug Taker
- William McInnes as Vince
- Noah Taylor as Skip
