= Girl's Life =

Single by Girlfriend

from the album Make It Come True
- Released: 13 July 1992
- Length: 4:05
- Label: BMG Australia
- Songwriter(s): Pam Reswick; Steve Werfel; Claude Gaudette; Doug Lambert
- Producer(s): Noel Macdonald

Girlfriend singles chronology
"Take It from Me" (1992)	"Girl's Life" (1992)	"Without You" (1992)

"Girl's Life" is a song by Australian group Girlfriend. The song was released in July 1992 as the group's second single from their debut studio album, Make It Come True. The song peaked at number 15 on the Australian Singles Chart. This song was originally recorded by a short-lived US girl group named Rainbow Girls on their album Girl's Life.

The song used the Spice Girls' eventual catchphrase "girl power". In 2017, band member Robyn Loau said "I remember in the early '90s we met with a big pop manager in the United Kingdom who went off to put together the Spice Girls. I'm not sure how much of meeting us was his blueprint for the Spice Girls. It was interesting they all had a very certain role, which Girlfriend had also. I feel as though we were pioneers, even if we were unaware of it at the time."

== Track listing ==
BMG (74321108862)
No.	Title	Length
1.	"Girl's Life" (radio mix)	4:05
2.	"Girl's Life" (Snaredom mix)	4:03
3.	"Girl's Life" (Late Night mix)	4:25
4.	"Girl's Life" (Karaoke)	3:58

== Charts ==
=== Weekly charts ===
Chart (1992–1993)	Peak position
Australia (ARIA)	15
UK Singles (OCC)	68

=== Year-end charts ===
Chart (1992)	Position
Australia (ARIA)	87
