= Girlfriend (group) =

Australian girl group

Girlfriend / GF4
- Girlfriend left to right: Lorinda Noble, Melanie Alexander, Jacqui Cowell, Robyn Loau and Siobhann Heidenreich.

Background information
- Origin: Australia
- Genres: Pop, dance-pop
- Years active: 1991–1996
- Label: BMG
- Members: Robyn Loau; Melanie Alexander; Lorinda (Rindy) Noble; Siobhánn Heidenreich; Jacqueline (Jacqui) Cowell

Girlfriend was an Australian girl group formed in 1991. Their debut album Make It Come True was released in 1992 and contained four ARIA top 50 singles, including the number-one hit, "Take It from Me". The group also became recognised for its fashion sense, with their flower hats becoming a symbol of the band; at one point, they had their own clothing line.

After the departure of lead vocalist Robyn Loau, the group changed its name to GF4.

== Career ==
=== Career beginnings and singing ===
Three of the members—Jacqueline Cowell, Siobhánn Heidenreich and Melanie Alexander — first met while taking dance lessons at age three. Years later, they decided to form a pop group, and through their dance teacher Janice Breen, met Noel MacDonald, a singer, songwriter and jingle producer who saw promise in them. Two more singers were added to the group – Robyn Loau, who MacDonald saw singing at Wonderland Sydney Theme Park, and Lorinda Noble, who auditioned for the group. MacDonald also put the girls in touch with Ross Wood. For two years, Wood, a former television cameraman and director, had struggled to see his own concept of an all-female pop group become a reality. During those two years he had continually presented his idea of an all-girl pop group aimed directly at the neglected younger teen market to virtually all the local record labels, but only Mushroom and BMG expressed any interest in signing them. Of course the "them" at the point Wood was pitching his idea was still a vague idea with unnamed girls; Girlfriend as an actual group gave him something more tangible to pitch. Singer and choreographer Kelley Abbey was also brought in to choreograph the group's dance moves. The quintet was signed to a deal with RCA Records Australia in 1991, after a year of self-promotion. The band were formed with the ambition of being both Australia and Asia's #1 girl band, with the band members, particularly Robyn Loau, undertaking extensive Japanese lessons.

=== 1992–1993: Make It Come True and It's Up to You ===
In April 1992, the group released their debut single, "Take It from Me", which reached No. 1 on the ARIA chart. This was followed by "Girl's Life" (#15) and "Without You" (#18). In September 1992, Girlfriend released their debut studio album, Make It Come True which peaked at number 6 in Australia.

In April 1993, Girlfriend released Girl's Life, a Japan-exclusive album, consisting of songs from Make It Come True, mostly re-recorded with Japanese vocals.

In September 1993, Girlfriend released "Heartbeat", the lead single from their second studio album, before releasing It's Up to You in October 1993. The group's two studio albums, Make It Come True (1992) and It's Up to You (1993) were certified platinum and gold respectively in Australia.

In November, the group released a four-track Japan-only extended play titled Magic.

=== 1994–1996: GF4 ===
In 1994, after the group had returned from a tour in Europe and Japan, Loau left the group to start a solo career. She later enjoyed minor success with the hit "Sick with Love" which peaked at number 21 on the ARIA Charts, and released an album, Malaria.

The four remaining members renamed themselves as GF4. GF4 released two singles; the first, a cover version of the 1971 Grass Roots song "Sooner or Later", reached No. 11 on the ARIA singles charts. In 1995, Jacqui Cowell left the band and was replaced by future Bardot member, Belinda Chapple, who was featured in the music video for GF4's second single, "Need Love (To Make the Sex Right)", a cover of Olivia Newton-John's "I Need Love", filmed at a Sydney nightclub. The video featured band member Siobhann Heidenriech miming to Cowell's spoken lines in the opening to the song. The single narrowly missed the ARIA Top 100 singles chart, resulting in the debut album that GF4 had recorded in Los Angeles being shelved. GF4 did not release any further material as a band and split in 1996.

=== Later appearances ===
On 13 May 2007, the former five members of Girlfriend appeared on Channel 7's Where Are They Now? program. The five spoke about their time with Girlfriend and performed an a cappella rendition of "Take It from Me" for the live audience.

A "best-of" compilation, Essential Girlfriend, was scheduled for release in November 2010, but remains unreleased.

In November 2010, former member Melanie Alexander provided guest vocals on the song "Falling for the Dance Floor" with Australian DJ, Stonedog. The track appears on the compilation album Club Anthems Asia, released through Hong Kong-based independent dance music label Volume Up Records.

In May 2017, Robyn Loau confirmed that the original members were reuniting for the 25th anniversary of their #1 hit "Take It from Me".

== Members ==
- Robyn Loau (1991-94)
- Melanie Alexander (1991-96)
- Lorinda (Rindy) Noble (1991-96)
- Siobhánn Heidenreich (1991-96)
- Jacqueline (Jacqui) Cowell (1991-95)
- Belinda Chapple (1995-96)

== Discography ==
=== Studio albums ===
Title	Album details	Peak chart positions	Certification
Title	Album details	AUS	Certification
Make It Come True	Release date: 21 September 1992; Label: BMG (74321115982); Formats: CD, cassette	6	ARIA: Platinum
It's Up to You	Release date: 25 October 1993; Label: BMG (74321166644); Formats: CD, cassette	29	ARIA: Gold

=== Compilations ===
Title	Album details
Girl's Life	Release date: 21 April 1993 (Japan only); Label: RCA (VCR-611); Formats: CD

=== Extended plays ===
Title	EP details
Magic	Release date: 21 November 1993 (Japan only); Label: BMG (BVCR-1003); Formats: CD

=== Singles ===
Year	Single	Peak positions			Certifications	Album
Year	Single	AUS	NZ	UK	Certifications	Album
1992	"Take It from Me"	1	44	47	ARIA: Gold	Make It Come True
1992	"Girl's Life"	15	—	68		Make It Come True
1992	"Without You"	18	—	—		Make It Come True
1992	"Bad Attitude"	28	—	—		Make It Come True
1993	"Love's on My Mind"	65	—	—		Make It Come True
1993	"Heartbeat"	36	—	—		It's Up to You
1993	"Wishing on the Same Star"	44	—	—		It's Up to You
1994	"Sooner or Later" (as GF4)	11	—	—		Non-album single
1995	"Need Love (To Make the Sex Right)" (as GF4)	101	—	—		Non-album single
"—" denotes releases that did not chart or were not released.

== Awards ==
=== ARIA Music Awards ===
The ARIA Music Awards is an annual awards ceremony held by the Australian Recording Industry Association. Girlfriend received three nominations.

Year	Nominee / work	Award	Result
1993	Make It Come True	Best New Talent	Nominated
1993	"Take It from Me"	Highest Selling Single	Nominated
1994	It's Up to You	Best Pop Release	Nominated

== See also ==
- List of artists who reached number one on the Australian singles chart
