= Take It from Me (Girlfriend song) =

Single by Girlfriend

from the album Make It Come True
- Released: April 1992
- Length: 3:33
- Label: RCA; BMG Australia
- Songwriter(s): Noel Macdonald; Jamie Muhoberac; Justine Bradley; Rick Price
- Producer(s): Noel Macdonald

Girlfriend singles chronology
"Take It from Me" (1992)	"Girl's Life" (1992)

"Take It from Me" is the debut single by Australian girl group Girlfriend, released in April 1992 from the group's debut studio album, Make It Come True. The song peaked at number one in Australia, becoming the act's only major chart success in their career. The song was also released in New Zealand and the United Kingdom, charting within the top 50 in both countries.

== Track listing ==
Australian CD single
No.	Title	Length
1.	"Take It from Me" (single mix)	3:33
2.	"Take It from Me" (Funky mix)	3:30
3.	"Take It from Me" (karaoke mix)	3:31

== Charts ==
=== Weekly charts ===
Chart (1992–1993)	Peak position
Australia (ARIA)	1
New Zealand (Recorded Music NZ)	44
UK Singles (OCC)	47

=== Year-end charts ===
Chart (1992)	Position
Australia (ARIA)	16

== Certifications ==
Region	Certification	Certified units/sales
Australia (ARIA)	Gold	35,000^{^}
^{^} Shipments figures based on certification alone.

== Release history ==
Region	Date	Format(s)	Label(s)	Ref.
Australia	April 1992	CD; cassette	RCA; BMG Australia	
United Kingdom	18 January 1993	7-inch vinyl; CD; cassette	Arista; BMG	

== See also ==
- List of number-one singles in Australia during the 1990s
