= James Reavis =

American forger and fraudster (1843–1914)

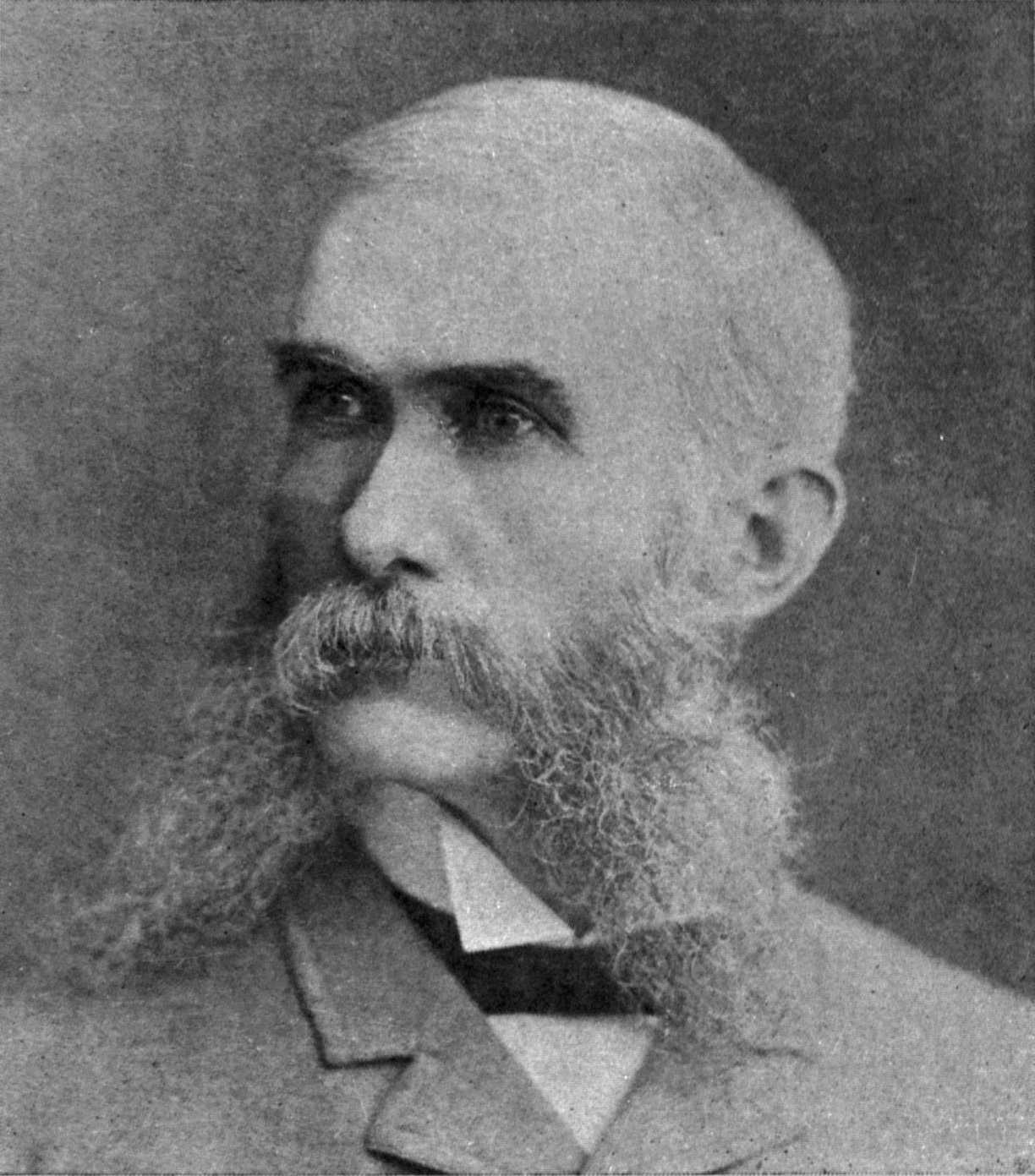
- Reavis in 1900
- Born: James Addison Reavis; May 10, 1843; Henry County, Missouri
- Died: November 27, 1914 (aged 71); Denver, Colorado
- Other name: Baron of Arizona
- Occupations: Soldier, Real Estate agent, Street Car Conductor
- Spouse(s): Ada Pope (1874–1883); Sophia Treadway (1882?–1902) (Note: Reavis' second marriage was not publicly acknowledged until 1886. Some sources indicate the documents used to establish the marriage beginning on December 31, 1882, were probably forged at a later date.)
- Convictions: Fraud and Forgery (1895)
- Penalty: US$5,000 fine and 2 years prison

James Addison Reavis (May 10, 1843 – November 27, 1914), later using the name James Addison Peralta-Reavis, the so-called Baron of Arizona, (Note: While Reavis was commonly referred to as "Baron", he never used the term himself. He instead used the term "Barony" when referring to his claim as a means of emphasizing his wife's supposed noble lineage.) was an American forger and fraudster. He is best known in association with the Peralta land grant, also known as the Barony of Arizona, a pair of fraudulent land claims, which if certified, would have granted him ownership of over 18,600 square miles (48,200 km^{2}) of land in central Arizona Territory and western New Mexico Territory. During the course of the fraud, Reavis collected an estimated US$5.3 million in cash and promissory notes ($205 million in present-day terms) through the sale of quitclaims and proposed investment plans.

Under the terms of the Treaty of Guadalupe Hidalgo and the Gadsden Purchase, the United States was required to recognize and honor existing land grants made by either the Spanish or Mexican governments. Reavis used this provision by manufacturing a fictional claim and then generating a collection of documents demonstrating how the claim came into his possession. The documents were then covertly inserted into various records archives. In his initial claim, Reavis claimed title to the grant via a series of conveyances. When serious challenges to this claim developed, Reavis developed a second claim by marrying the purported last surviving lineal descendant of the original claim recipient.

During the course of his deception, Reavis convinced prominent people to support his efforts. He obtained legal and political support from Roscoe Conkling, Robert G. Ingersoll, and James Broadhead. Business leaders such as Charles Crocker and John W. Mackay, in turn, provided financial support. Initial exposure of the fraud occurred when an unfavorable surveyor general report caused the claim to be summarily dismissed. In response to this action, Reavis sued the U.S. government for US$11 million in damages ($426 million in present-day terms). The suit, in turn, prompted the U.S. government to perform a detailed investigation that fully exposed the forgeries Reavis had planted in a variety of locations.

== Early life ==
Reavis was born the second of five children to Fenton George Reavis and Mary Reavis (née Dixon) on May 10, 1843, in Henry County, Missouri, near the town of Clinton. His father was a Welshman who had immigrated to the United States in the early 1820s. His mother was of Scottish and Spanish descent and proud of her Spanish heritage. The family lived on a small farm and owned a small tannery. Reavis received little formal education, but his mother read Spanish Romantic literature to him, and he developed a grandiose and eloquent writing pattern. In 1857, the family sold their farm and moved to Montevallo, Missouri, where they opened a store.

Following the outbreak of the American Civil War, Reavis enlisted in Hunter's Regiment of the Confederate Army, 8th Division of the Missouri State Guard. Several months later, he went to Springfield and re-enlisted in Captain Lowe's company. Initially holding dreams of glory, the 18-year-old Reavis soon discovered the realities of military life did not match his romanticized ideals. About this time, he accidentally discovered that he could accurately reproduce his commanding officer's signature. Using this new-found skill, Reavis began producing passes to avoid the drudgery of army life, and instead spent time visiting his mother. When his fellow soldiers noticed the frequency and manner by which he obtained his passes, Reavis began selling forged passes to them. When some of his superiors became suspicious of Reavis, he obtained leave supposedly to get married, but instead used it to surrender to Union forces. Following his surrender, Reavis joined the Union Army and briefly served in an artillery regiment.

Following the war, Reavis traveled to Brazil and learned Portuguese. He returned to St. Louis, Missouri, near the end of 1866. There, he worked a series of jobs, including streetcar conductor, traveling salesman, and clerk at a variety of retail stores. Eventually, he found success as a real-estate agent. After several small real-estate deals, Reavis saved enough money to open his own office. He then discovered that the skills he learned forging army passes allowed him to adjust real-estate paperwork and correct imperfect property titles. In one established instance, he aided in this manner a man seeking to purchase a tract of land near St. Louis. Three generations of documents accumulated by the selling family were unable to establish clear title for the land. Reavis was able to produce a yellowed and fading 18th-century document that all previous searches had failed to notice. Accepted as valid by all parties to the transaction, this (forged) document allowed his client to complete the transaction.

== George Willing ==
Reavis met George M. Willing Jr. in 1871. Willing was a physician-turned-prospector who supplemented his income selling patent medicine. He came to the real estate agent upon the recommendation of Colonel Byser, a previous customer of Reavis's, seeking assistance with a real estate purchase. According to Willing, he had purchased the rights to a large Spanish land grant from Miguel Peralta for US$20,000 in gold dust, prospecting equipment, and saddle mules. The transaction had occurred at a simple mining site in Black Canyon, southeast of Prescott, Arizona Territory without the usual documentation. As Willing explained, "When the trade was made, I had no paper on which to write the deed, so I scoured the camp and found a sheet of greasy, pencil-marked camp paper upon which I wrote ... and as there were no justices or notaries present I had it acknowledged before witnesses." The deed of transfer was dated October 20, 1864.

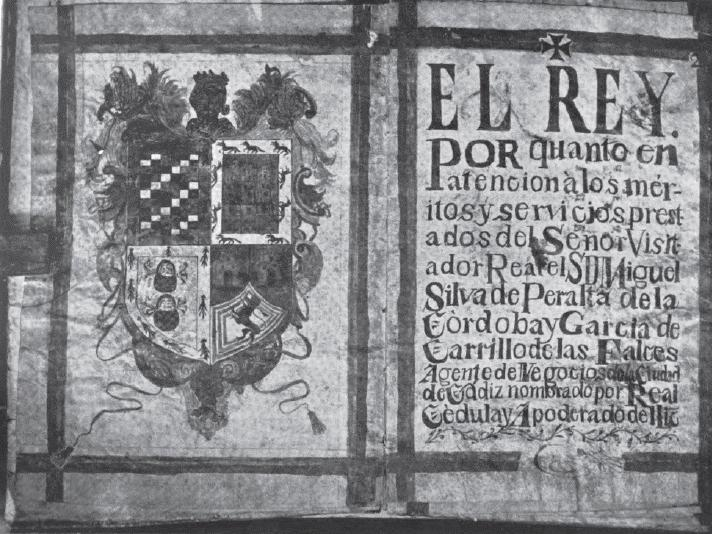
Cover of royal cedula (decree) initially establishing the Peralta grant

Willing reached Prescott in 1867 to record the transaction. He was short of funds at the time of his arrival, so offered to sell a half interest in the claim to the local stable owner, James D. Monihon. Willing suggested that the two of them could reap a sizable profit by selling nearby mines back to their owners. Monihon was incensed by the offer, and the local townsfolk were soon unfriendly to Willing. Fearing for his safety, Willing quickly settled his bills and left the next morning with a government surveying team destined for Santa Fe.

Reavis suggested that Willing leave the documents to allow him time to inspect them. Willing declined the offer, and instead returned the next day with an expert in Spanish land titles, William W. Gitt. Recently returned to St. Louis, Gitt was known as the "Old Spanish Land Title Lawyer" following a series of dubious land deals in Illinois and Missouri. The previous two decades he had lived in Guadalajara, Mexico, after an 1847 land claim lawsuit had resulted in a bench warrant being issued in the lawyer's name.

The three men began meeting for several hours each week to examine the grant paperwork. In addition to the deed between Willing and Peralta, they had an expediente, a copy of the legal papers relating to the Peralta grant. Accompanying the copies was a letter dated 1853 and bearing the signature of Mexican President Antonio López de Santa Anna claiming a diligent search had been performed to locate all related documents and that the expediente established secure title of the grant. Reavis used this time and association with Gitt to learn about Mexican and Spanish land documents. He also developed a friendship with Willing's wife, Mary Ann, whom the young real estate agent regarded as a second mother.

After a few years, Reavis and Willing formed a partnership aimed at promoting the claim. The two men planned to travel separately, allowing Willing to retain Reavis as a real estate expert upon his arrival. Willing left with the paperwork in January 1874, taking the overland route to Arizona Territory. Reavis traveled by sea to California via Panama. In California, Reavis visited Florin Massol, a Sacramento merchant with whom Willing had left papers assigning mining rights within the Peralta grant as collateral against a loan.

Reavis married Ada Pope of Montevallo on May 5, 1874. The couple had known each other since the days when Reavis' family operated their store. Following a brief honeymoon, he departed for the west and the couple did not see each other again for over six years. Dissatisfied with the state of their marriage, she received a divorce on grounds of desertion in 1883.

== Establishing the grant ==
Willing arrived in Prescott in March 1874 and filed his claim in the Yavapai County Courthouse. The next morning, he was found dead. No official investigation as to the cause of Willing's death was ever performed. Suggested causes include poison, "exposure and privation", or simply "strange and unwitnessed circumstances". Reavis learned of his partner's death upon his arrival in San Francisco. He had expected a bundle of correspondence awaiting his arrival, but instead found only two letters. The first, from Willing, announcing the doctor's safe arrival in Prescott. The second, informing Reavis of Willing's death, was from the Yavapai County sheriff who sent a letter to the only address in the doctor's papers.

Reavis needed Willing's papers to continue the scheme. In poor health from the journey and low on funds, Reavis worked as a schoolteacher in Downey, California, during 1875 and 1876. He then worked as a journalist in Northern California, serving as a correspondent for The San Francisco Examiner and San Francisco Call with occasional work for a New York City paper. As a result of his journalism jobs, Reavis met railroad tycoons Collis Huntington and Charles Crocker. He was also able to observe the operation of the Public Land Commission. At the time the commission had approved over 500 of the 800 claims presented to it, and even frivolous claims were considered as long as examination expenses were paid by the filer, and bribery was a commonly accepted practice. Assuming practices in Arizona Territory were similar to those in California gave Reavis great hope for confirmation of the Peralta grant.

Reavis' first visit to Arizona Territory came with a May 1880 trip to Phoenix. Posing as a subscription agent for the San Francisco Examiner, he toured the area and even made a trip out to the confluence of Salt and Gila Rivers. From Phoenix, Reavis took a stagecoach to Prescott. Upon his arrival in the territorial capital, he inquired into Dr. Willing's death. After locating the probate judge who had overseen the case, Reavis presented a letter from Willing's widow authorizing him to take custody of any papers that had been in Willing's possession. A search by the probate judge located Willing's possessions and gave Reavis control of the Peralta grant paperwork. After completing this business, Reavis returned to California.

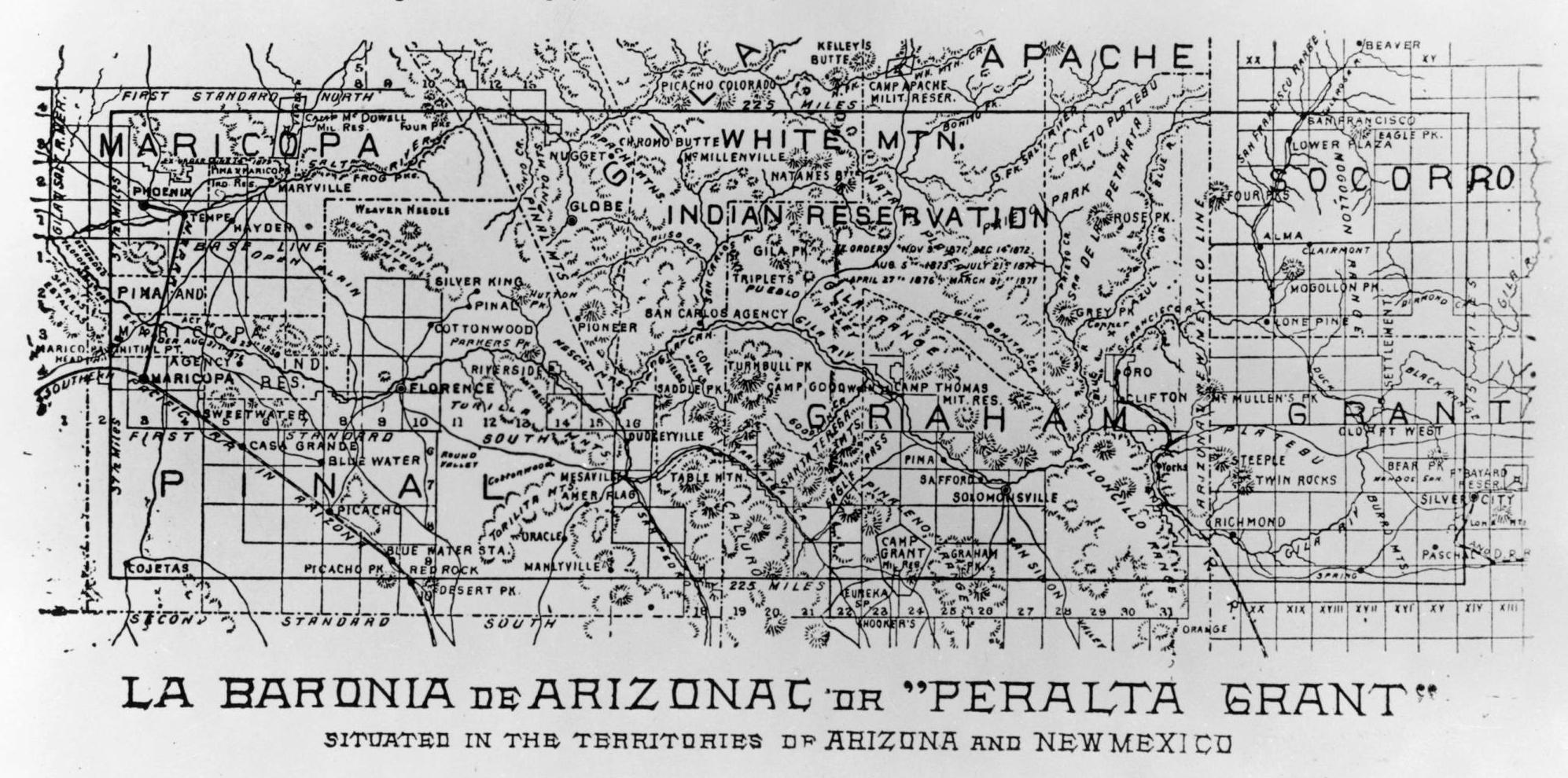
The Peralta land grant in its final form

Under Willing, the grant had been a "floater", a grant for a certain amount of territory, but lacking a fixed location. Such grants, while common, were useful as legal nuisances capable of scaring an unsophisticated land owner, but of little real value. Reavis decided to change this and fixed the location of the grant. To deal with ambiguities regarding various historical measurements, he chose the definitions most advantageous to his goals. As a result, the grant for a 10 by 30-league area turned into a territory running 49.5 miles (79.7 km) north to south and 149.5 miles (240.6 km) east to west. The size later grew to 78.8307 by 236.4921 miles (127 km × 381 km) With the center of its western boundary set near the confluence of the Salt and Gila Rivers, the grant contained the towns of Phoenix, Globe, Casa Grande, Florence, and Tempe and stretched to the outskirts of Silver City, New Mexico. Other points of interest within the grant boundaries were the Silver King Mine and a section of the Southern Pacific Railroad.

To achieve his vision, Reavis had to first clear some outstanding business issues and obtain additional documentation. His first step was a July 1881 visit to the family of Florin Massol, where he obtained a release of the mining rights that Willing had signed over, in exchange for a contract to pay US$3000 plus interest to Massol on the condition that the Peralta grant be confirmed. Additionally, Massol, using a power of attorney, signed over Willing's interest in the grant to Reavis. Reavis then traveled to the East Coast. The record book for Mission San Xavier del Bac, which had been sent to Philadelphia for the Centennial Exposition, was at the time in Washington, DC, pending its return to Bishop Salpointe. While in Washington, Reavis obtained permission to examine the book in detail.

After examining the San Xavier record book, Reavis traveled to Mexico, where from September to November 1881, he searched the archives in Guadalajara and Mexico City for information related to the Peralta grant. In Mexico, he resumed the role of a newspaper correspondent looking for items of interest to Los Angeles and San Francisco readers. He also cultivated friendships with the archivists in both cities, relationships that enabled him to gain easy access to the materials he was interested in inspecting. By the time he left Mexico, Reavis had a collection of photographs and certified copies of papers related to the Peralta grant. Reavis then traveled to see Mary Ann Willing, who was then living in Kentucky. During his visit, on May 1, 1882, the widow signed over her interest in the grant for US$30,000 paid over time.

=== First Baron of Arizona ===
Contained within the collection of papers Reavis had collected was the story of the Peralta grant's creation and the life history of the fictional first and second Barons of Arizona. The tale began with the birth of Don Miguel Nemecio Silva de Peralta de la Córdoba in 1708 to Don José Gaston Silva y Carrillo de Peralta de las Falces de Mendoza and Doña Francisca Maria de Garcia de la Córdoba y Muñiz de Perez. Don Miguel entered the King of Spain's service in 1727 as a lieutenant of dragoons. He was appointed visitador del rey, a royal inspector, in 1742 and sent on a secret mission to Guadalajara in New Spain. Papers confirming Don Miguel's appointment named him as Baron of Arizonaca, Knight of the Golden Fleece, and member of the Order of Montesa.

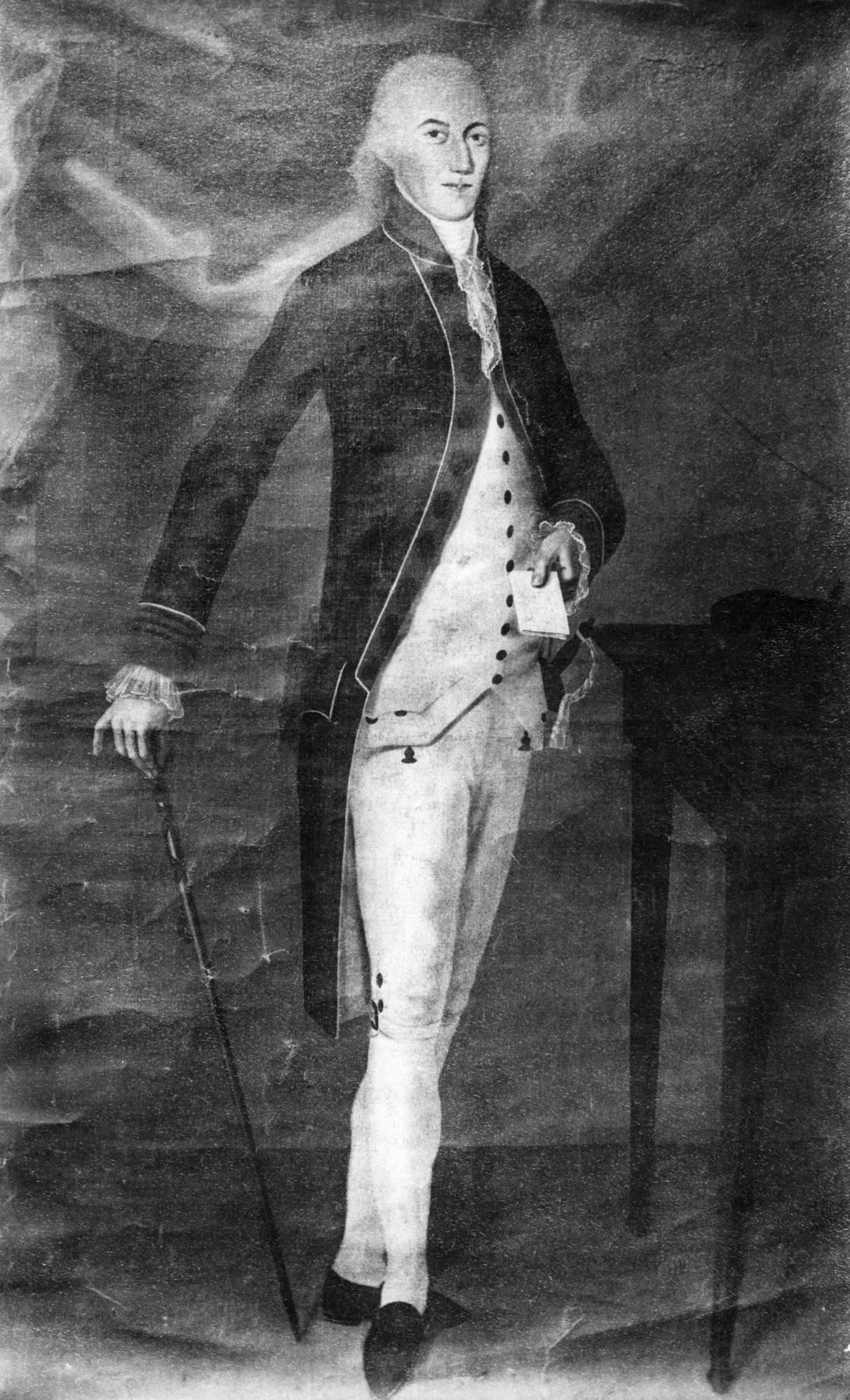
Depiction of Don Miguel Nemecio Silva de Peralta de la Cordoba, the fictional first Baron of Arizona

The exact nature of the royal emissary's mission was never revealed, but may have involved leaked claims of silver being found in northern Sonora. Apparently pleased with the results, Philip V issued a royal cedula (decree) stating the royal intention to make a land grant to Don Miguel in November 1744. Philip's cedula was not acted upon until December 20, 1748, when Ferdinand VI promoted Don Miguel to captain of dragoons, bestowed upon him the title Baron of the Colorados, and issued another cedula instructing the Viceroy of New Spain to locate a suitable tract containing 300 square leagues of land.

A suitable tract of land was not located north of Mission San Xavier del Bac until January 3, 1758, and a decree was issued by the Viceroy, Agustín de Ahumada, granting Don Miguel the land. The ceremony to physically locate and mark the claim occurred in May 1758. Don Miguel traveled to the claim's location accompanied by a priest from San Xavier and two officers from the viceroy's garrison. The priest served as adjudicator, while the officers acted as witnesses and surveyors. During the ceremony, a large rock located on top of a hill, which they name the "Inicial Monument", was spotted and chosen to mark the center of the property's western boundary.

Following the expulsion of the Jesuits from New Spain in 1768, Don Miguel sent a request to Charles III for reconfirmation of his grant. The request was granted in 1776, an unusually long delay even accounting for bureaucratic processing and travel times of the day, in the form of a letter reading "I, the King of Spain, gratefully acknowledge your many valuable services in the army of the crown, and approve the grant to you which you have above described."

Don Miguel made one attempt to settle on his land, using the ruins at Casa Grande as his base of operation. The attempt was unsuccessful due to persistent raids from Apache. After the failed attempt, Don Miguel returned to Mexico, where in November 1770, he married Sofia Ave Maria Sanchez Bonilla de Amaya y Garcia de Orosco at Etzatlán. The marriage produced one son, Jesus Miguel Silva de Peralta de la Córdoba y Sanchez de Bonilla, in 1781.

In addition to a will, Don Miguel created several additional documents to ensure his son would inherit his complete estate. In 1788, Don Miguel placed a codicil in Guadalajara indicating his wishes. Additionally, Don Miguel went to the trouble in August 1787 of creating a cedula before a notary in Guadalajara documenting the Peralta grant, title, coat of arms, and the ancestry of his son. Don Miguel fell ill and died aged 116. He was buried in Guadalajara on February 2, 1824.

== First claim ==
After completing his work in Mexico, Reavis returned to San Francisco. There, he showed his documents to influential people and wrote several anonymous news articles for the Examiner claiming "irrefutable evidence" supported his claim on the Peralta grant. During this time, he also was in negotiations with executives from the Southern Pacific Railroad. The executives were interested in securing a 200-foot-wide (61 m) right-of-way for their railroad where their tracks crossed the grant, while simultaneously blocking the Texas Pacific Railroad from doing the same. As a result of these talks, Charles Crocker signed an agreement providing Reavis with US$5000 upfront money and US$50,000 total to secure an easement across the Peralta grant.

Reavis' first official action came in October 1882, when he filed papers with the Safford, Arizona Territory, probate court showing he had been assigned Willing's deeds. The reason for this filing is unclear, as the probate court did not have authority to determine the validity of the claim. The small county seat may have allowed Reavis to better solidify his claim with a minimum of other people taking notice at the time.

The official filing of the claim came on March 27, 1883, in the Tucson office of Surveyor General J.W. Robbins. In addition to Willing's deed of purchase, Reavis filed copies of the cedulas, wills, codicils, and proclamations he had secured documenting the first baron's life. The collection of documents filled two trunks. Following an initial examination of the documents, which lasted into the night, Robins promised to register the claim and begin his investigation as the first stage of the certification.

After filing his claim, Reavis established his base of operations at Arizola, Arizona. This was a location near Casa Grande containing a small set of ruins that had supposedly been used by the first baron as La Hacienda de Peralta. Reavis brought in craftsmen to build a mansion of redwood and red brick on the site, complete with servant quarters, stables, storage sheds, and a protective stone wall surrounding the site.

While the construction was beginning, Reavis began hiring rent collectors and agents. He also opened negotiations with James M. Barney, owner of the Silver King Mining Company. After several weeks Barney agreed to pay US$25,000 for a quitclaim. While a considerable sum for the day, this price was small compared to the profits generated by the mine. Reavis then printed and posted notices throughout the claim instructing residents to contact his lawyer "for registering tenancy and signing agreements, or regard themselves liable to litigation for trespassing and expulsion when the Peralta Grant is, as it must be, validated by the U.S. Government." Arrangements for newspapers and hired publicists announcing the land grant were made, proclaiming the title was ironclad and included both water and mineral rights.

Soon after, Reavis and his agents began selling quitclaims to gullible and frightened settlers located within the claim boundaries. The prices charged for the quitclaims varied greatly and showed little relation to the value of a property or the current occupant's ability to pay. Some residents received demands for as much as US$1,000, while others obtained a release for free or in exchange for a meal or a few drinks.

Initial reaction to the notices by local residents was stunned disbelief. The claim had the potential to nullify all existing land titles within the grant, and most residents were concerned by the threat of possible litigation. When word spread that both the Southern Pacific Railroad and Silver King Mine had agreed to terms with Reavis, concern turned to panic. Many residents reasoned that if the mine and railroad, with their associated financial and legal resources, found Reavis' claim too strong to fight, then they stood no chance against it. This belief was augmented by Reavis' willingness to allow any interested party access to inspect his documents. Faced with this challenge, some area pioneers abandoned their homes and land instead of trying to deal with Reavis.

=== Collapse of the claim ===
Most territory residents vehemently opposed Reavis' claim and his efforts to sell quitclaims. Leading the opposition were two Phoenix newspapers, the Herald and Gazette. Beginning in July 1883, the papers called upon area residents not to purchase quitclaims from Reavis. The effectiveness of this call was tainted in November 1883, when Herald owner Homer H. McNeil was revealed to have purchased a quitclaim for his property. In response to the public backlash, the embarrassed McNeil was forced to publicly cancel the purchase.

About the time McNeil was returning his quitclaim, the surveyor general's office dispatched Spanish-language expert Rufus C. Hopkins to Mexico. Reavis and one of his lawyers followed Hopkins. Upon their arrival in Guadalajara, Reavis made his best effort to become indispensable to the 70-year-old Hopkins. After introducing the Spanish expert to the local archivists, Reavis proceeded to guide him through the archives and point out the location of various documents. In addition to pointing out various bundles that he wished for Hopkins to inspect, Reavis took time to search new sections of the archive. During this effort, he discovered a copy of the December 1748 cedula recommending the initial grant.

While Reavis and Hopkins were in Mexico, Surveyor General J.W. Robbins died from tuberculosis, and was replaced by his chief clerk, Royal A. Johnson. Hopkins' report on his findings were favorable and indicated the claim was well founded. Johnson was unhappy with the report, noting that while it indicated the seals and signatures all appeared genuine, other parts of the original documents had been received on cursory inspection. Additionally, no copy of Charles III's signature had been located for comparison purposes. In a supplementary report, Hopkins indicated that he had found no mention of Peralta or the grant during a brief search of the records in Mexico City.

With the release of Hopkins' initial report, Reavis proclaimed that confirmation of his claim was just a matter of time. He even began rumors that the U.S. government was planning to offer US$100 million to buy rights to his claim. Johnson, in turn, only reported that the investigation was ongoing and refused to provide additional details to the public. As a result, the surveyor general was labeled as an accomplice to Reavis and vilified by the local newspapers.

While this was going on, Reavis sought to expand his sale of quitclaims from Phoenix, where his efforts were initially focused, to the town of Florence. The initial target of the expansion was Tom Weedin, editor of the Florence Enterprise, whom Reavis approached in January 1884. The newspaper editor refused Reavis's offer and instead published an editorial calling for creation of a committee to raise funds to hire a lawyer to fight the Peralta grant in court. Shortly thereafter, Anti-Reavis committees were established in Florence, Globe, Phoenix, and Tempe.

Over the next year-and-a-half, Reavis faced two lawsuits. The first came from George Willing, Sr., father of Reavis' former business partner. The elder Willing claimed that Mary Ann Willing only possessed a life estate on her husband's property and could not have legally provided a warranty deed to Reavis. An attempt to raise funds for this suit was made by appealing to residents living within the grant and offering land for 20% less than the price set by Congress. The attempt was unsuccessful. As a result, Willing ran out of funds after a short time and was not heard from again.

The second suit was filed by Territorial Attorney General Clark Churchill to settle title issues with his personal land holdings. To deal with Churchill's suit, Reavis employed a strategy of delay and obfuscation. During a February 1884 deposition, Reavis was forced to explain how he had come into possession of the Peralta grant and the nature of his relationship with Mary Ann Willing. Questions into his finances, however, were answered vaguely, with Reavis claiming he would need to consult his "agents" to determine most details. Additional questions regarding the exact boundaries of the grant were answered with similarly vague responses. When the suit came to trial in May 1885, Reavis argued the court did not have jurisdiction to determine the validity of a Spanish grant. The court overruled this and granted Churchill clear title to his property.

Following the ruling in the Churchill suit, United States General Land Office Commissioner W. A. Sparks communicated with Royal Johnson instructing the surveyor general to halt work on verifying the Peralta grant. Johnson willingly honored the request. Territorial residents were elated by news of this event, as it effectively halted Reavis' efforts. The Tucson Citizen reported, "The tempest was all in a teapot after all", while another territorial newspaper ran the headline "Reavis Nailed Up". Public meetings were quickly organized throughout the territory calling for a final determination on the grant. Sensing the situation turning against him, Reavis hastily left for California. Two weeks later, he was largely forgotten as Geronimo led 144 Chiricahua Apache off the reservation and brought the Apache Wars back to Arizona Territory.

== Second claim ==
Before the collapse of his first claim, Reavis realized the complex series of conveyances on which he based his claim to the Peralta grant represented a serious weakness to his plans. To overcome this weakness, Reavis had begun the work to establish an heiress to the grant while he was still preparing his first claim.

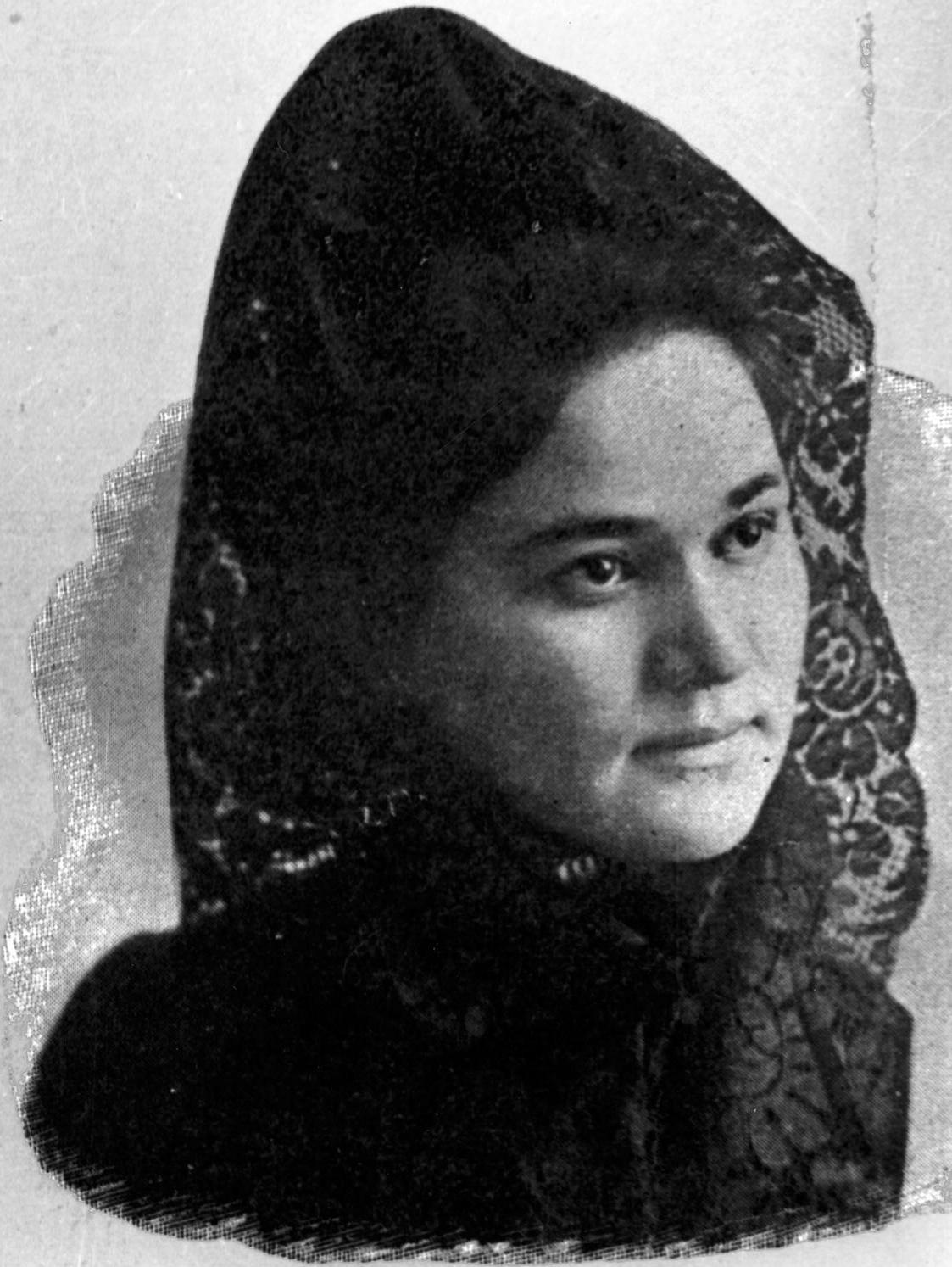
Doña Sophia Micaela Maso Reavis y Peralta de la Córdoba, third Baroness of Arizona

Reavis claimed to have heard rumors of a Peralta descendant as early as his 1875 arrival in California. He did not meet the heiress, though, until 1877. While traveling on a train, he spotted a young lady who bore a striking resemblance to the second baroness. (Note: Reavis never provided an explanation as to how he had learned the appearance of the wife of the second Baron of Arizona prior to his 1877 encounter with Sophia.) After inquiring about her identity and background, and learning she knew of the name Maso, Reavis told her that she was most likely the heiress to a large fortune. As the young lady had no papers establishing her identity, finding them was left to Reavis. The pair exchanged letters until the end of 1882. At that time, Reavis visited her in Knights Landing, California, where she worked as a house servant, and proposed marriage. The couple married in a civil ceremony dated December 31, 1882. (Note: As Reavis was still married to Ada Pope till their divorce the next year, the second marriage was initially kept secret.) Following their marriage, Reavis enrolled his new bride in a convent school to train her in the skills expected of a well-born lady.

After his first claim collapsed, Reavis returned to California to collect letters of introduction to influential New Yorkers from his friends and business contacts. To these, he added a number of Spanish contacts from his association with Spanish reporter Carlos Satana and a friendship with the Spanish consul stationed in San Francisco. Reavis then traveled with his wife, who was presented as his ward, to New York. There, he met with persons such as U.S. Senator Roscoe Conkling, former U.S. Congressman Dwight Townsend, Henry Porter of the American Bank Note Company, and Hector de Castro. John W. Mackay was so impressed by Reavis' papers that he agreed to finance a search of the Spanish archives for additional documents. To this end, Mackay provided him with a US$500/month stipend, an amount sufficient for the Reavis party to travel in a manner consistent with an influential family.

In December 1885, the Reavis party sailed for Europe. Upon reaching Spain, Reavis began searching archives in Madrid and Seville for information related to the second baron and his descendants. Several months of searching were needed before Don Jesus Miguel's will leaving his estate to Sophia was located. In addition to the various documents he located in the archives, Reavis also acquired several portrait paintings and daguerreotype photographs of individuals he claimed to have been his wife's ancestors. Spanish members of the Peralta and Ibarras, believing Sophia was a long-lost relative, entertained Reavis' wife while he was performing his search. After he located the desired papers, Reavis and his wife publicly announced their marriage and recorded their marriage contract with the United States legation's chargé d'affaires. The announcement was met with a new round of celebrations before the couple left Spain to make a tour of Mediterranean ports. The couple did not return to the United States till November 1886.

Upon his return, Reavis visited New York to renew his acquaintances with various political and business leaders. Showing his recently acquired documents to these luminaries netted Reavis several useful endorsements. James Broadhead, who in 1884 believed the claim would be denied, followed his examination by proclaiming, "The Peralta claim has been submitted to Mr. Conkling, Mr. Ingersoll, and Mr. Hurd, who have pronounced it good. I have associated with them in the case and my opinion coincides with theirs. Mr. J. Addison Reavis is the gentleman who is pushing the claim and his is a man of remarkable energy and persistence." Roscoe Conkling, in turn, stated, "I can say, however, that having been consulted ... and having made a somewhat careful examination of the ancient papers and other papers produces, of which there are many, and on the facts and history of the case, I find they all go to show Mrs. Reavis to be the person she believes herself to be, namely the lineal descendant of the original grantee." In addition to the endorsement, Conkling introduced Reavis to Robert G. Ingersoll. Ingersoll was so impressed by Peralta papers that he agreed to represent Reavis in his efforts to have the new claim confirmed.

From New York, the Reavis party went to California. There, Reavis obtained an affidavit from Alfred Sherwood certifying he had known Sophia and her parents since her birth, she had been born in San Diego County, California, and that she had been left in the custody of Don Jose R. C. Maso following the death of her mother and twin brother when her father had need to travel to Spain.

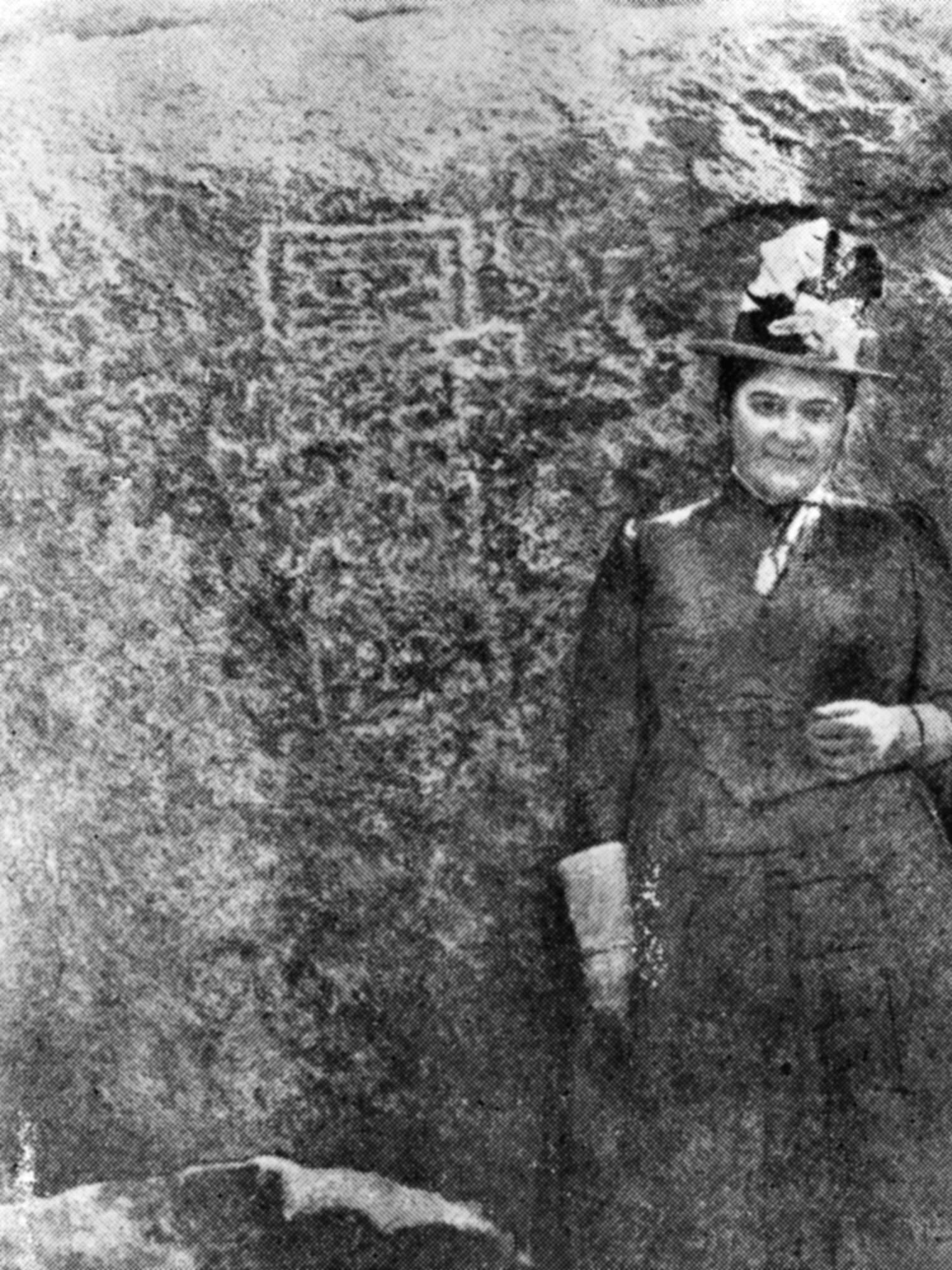
Third baroness of Arizona standing in front of "Inicial Monument"

By the time Reavis returned to Arizona Territory in August 1887, he was using the name "James Addison Peralta-Reavis". He went to Tucson to file a new claim on behalf of his wife, Doña Sophia Micaela Maso Reavis y Peralta de la Córdoba, third Baroness of Arizona. Before making the formal filing, Reavis hired a carriage and took a trip to the mountains south of Phoenix. During this trip, his wife and he happened across the "Inicial Monument" that marked her great-grandfather's land.

Formal filing of the second claim occurred on September 2, 1887. Included with the official copies and photographs of original wills and codicils was a photograph of the third baroness standing before the "Inicial Monument". With the discovery of this marker, the claim was shifted 8 miles (13 km) south. To address possible inconsistencies with his original claim, Reavis claimed he suspected some of Willing's papers to be forgeries, but upon advice of his lawyers, had filed his initial claim to initially establish the grant before U.S. authorities and to buy time while searching for proof of his wife's identity. Reavis also posted a US$10,000 deposit to assure an official survey of the grant. Surveyor General John Hise refused to allow the survey, as it would imply government approval of the claim.

=== Second baron and his family ===
Within the new filings were these additions to the Peralta family story:

The second Baron of Arizona, Don Jesus Miguel, never took an interest in his Arizona property due to the threatening Apache presence. He married Doña Juana Laura Ibarra, a member of a prominent Guadalajara family, in 1822. Something of a spendthrift, Don Jesus Miguel frittered away most of his inheritance. After selling most of his properties, the second baron settled into his Sonora estate. After ten years of marriage, the couple had their only child, Sophia Laura Micaela de Peralta de la Córdoba y Ibarra.

Doña Sophia married José Ramon Carmen Maso in 1860. With his remote location providing a limited selection of suitable suitors, the baron was initially pleased to have found a husband for his 28-year-old daughter. Only after the wedding did he discover his new son-in-law had a reputation as a "gentleman sport" (professional gambler) and ne'er-do-well in California.

In 1862, Maso was called to Spain to collect some funds owed to the baron and him. Maso left for San Francisco with the baron, his mother, Doña Carmelita Maso, and his then-pregnant wife. No explanation as to why the party did not embark from the more convenient port at Guaymas was ever given. While in Agua Mansa, California, Doña Sophia unexpectedly went into labor and gave birth to twins, one boy and one girl. The twins were quickly baptized at the nearby Mission San Salvador. Complications from the birth occurred and the boy and mother both died. A wet nurse was located and arrangements made for care of the newborn girl by a friend of Maso's, John A. Treadway. Maso then continued his journey, while Don Jesus Miguel remained in San Francisco to be near his granddaughter. Several months later, Don Jesus Miguel was summoned to Spain by Maso. They both died in Spain, but not before the baron had filed a codicil to his San Francisco will naming his granddaughter as his sole heir.

In California, Treadway made arrangements with Alfred Sherwood to look after the infant Sophia and Doña Carmelita Maso while he took a business trip. During this trip, Treadway died near Sacramento, California. Doña Carmelita Maso died when Sophia was five. When she was eight years old, Sophia was taken into the house of John Snowball. He remembered the young girl speaking of an inheritance that was to come to her.

=== Development plans for Arizona ===
Reaction to the new claim by Arizona residents was nearly unanimously negative, with some newspapers publishing open incitements to violence against Reavis. As a result of the opposition, sale of new quitclaims effectively ended.

During his trip to Spain and visits to New York, Reavis had gained an understanding of government and big business finance. He put this new knowledge to work and began offering investment opportunities involving development of Arizona Territory. With the accomplished business leaders he had met in New York advocating the legitimacy of his claim, Reavis began to gain millions of dollars in new funds. (Note: Of the estimated US$5.3 million ($205 million today) in cash and promissory notes acquired by Reavis during the course of his fraud, only US$175,000 to US$225,000 was ever accumulated while he was still pressing the first claim.)

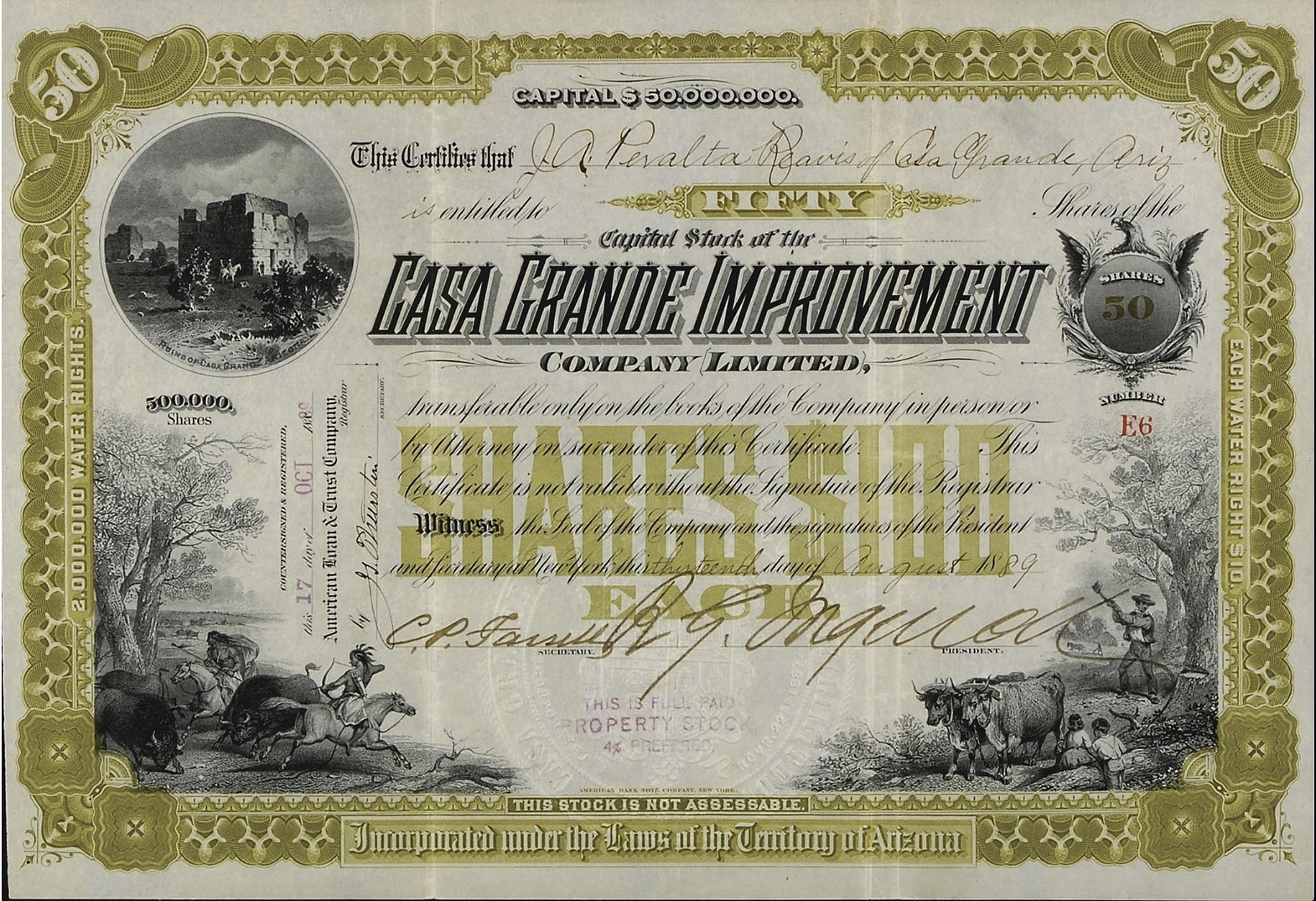
Stock certificate for the Casa Grande Improvement Company Limited

Reavis formed three corporations in rapid succession in 1887, each bearing the name Casa Grande Improvement Company. Each had Reavis as director and well-known business leaders selected to serve as president and vice presidents. The third, the Casa Grande Improvement Company of Arizona, was incorporated in November and absorbed the prior two entities. The company planned to develop the land of the grant by building roads, railways, dams, irrigation canals, telegraph lines, and other improvements, while simultaneously engaging in leasing water rights, selling livestock, and performing other activities. Robert G. Ingersoll was the company's first president, while other initial investors included Hector de Castro, Dwight Townsend, and Henry Porter of the American Bank Note Company.

Among the development plans Reavis announced was construction of a large-scale irrigation system. At the core of the system was a proposed 450 feet (140 m) masonry dam on the Salt River near its junction with Tonto Creek (near where Theodore Roosevelt Dam was later built) and a 250 feet (76 m) dam on the Gila River west of Florence. The proposed cost of these dams was US$2.5 million and US$1 million, respectively. (Note: The price estimates of US$2.5 million and US$1 million used by Reavis for construction of dams on the Salt and Gila Rivers appear unrealistically low. The 280 feet (85 m) Theodore Roosevelt Dam, completed in 1911 at the site of Reavis' proposed 450 feet (140 m) masonry dam, cost the U.S. government US$5.5 million to construct.)

By the time of the second filing, Reavis was dressing in the finest linen and broadcloth, while his wife wore the products of New York and San Francisco's best dressmakers. Finding conditions in Arizona too hostile to his ambitions, Reavis rarely spent time at his mansion in the town of Arizola. He and his wife instead maintained residences in San Francisco, St. Louis, and near New York City, where they entertained the social and financial elite. During one stay in New York, Mrs. Reavis, possibly feeling lonely while her husband was busy with his business dealings, found a two-month-old orphan boy. She adopted the boy and named him Fenton after her husband's father. Reavis also purchased a hacienda in Chihuahua. In Mexico, Reavis became a patron of various charities, opening a home for the blind and a hospital. Additionally, he built a monument dedicated to Don Miguel de Peralta in Monterrey and donated new altar linens for a cathedral in Guadalajara, Jalisco.

== Fraud revealed ==
Following the inauguration of Benjamin Harrison in March 1889, Royal Johnson was reappointed surveyor general for Arizona Territory that July. Despite having been out of office, Johnson had continued to investigate the validity of the Reavis claim. About this time, the acting commissioner of the Land Office had received inquiries as to the status of the Peralta grant. In September 1889, he sent Johnson a letter directing the surveyor general to "please report to me the exact condition of said grant as shown by papers and records in your office, and all the information you can obtain in regard to it." Johnson responded to this request on October 12, 1889, with the release of Adverse report of the Surveyor General of Arizona, Royal A. Johnson, upon the alleged Peralta Grant: a complete expose of its fraudulent character.

Among the issues found in the report with the Peralta grant were:

- Most of the claim's 18th-century documents showed evidence of having been written with steel-nibbed pens – a tool rarely used until the 19th century – instead of a quill.
- Printing styles on the Peralta documents differed with documents from the same time period, particularly in the use of the long s.
- Searches of Spanish archives for supporting documents had failed to find information on the Peralta grant in locations where such information was expected.
- Multiple spelling errors and grammar issues were present in the Peralta documents, a situation highly atypical of documents from the Spanish royal court.

Johnson's report was met with celebration by Arizona residents, and the once-demonized surveyor general became the toast of the town. The Gazette praised the surveyor general's intelligence and fairness, while extending the thanks of the Salt River valley. The Herald, in turn, printed, "No one has criticized Johnson more than we and these criticisms were founded largely on his own statements, but no one will do Mr. Johnson complete justice for his actions on behalf of the settlers sooner or more heartily give him credit for standing by them in their time of need than the Herald." Governor Murphy even invited Johnson to Phoenix where a public reception was held in his honor.

Response in Washington to Johnson's report was more subdued. Reavis had enlisted the aid of Secretary of the Interior John Willock Noble and U.S. Senator Francis Cockrell in his lobbying efforts. As a result, it took until February 20, 1890, for the commissioner of the Land Office, Lewis Groff, to respond to Johnson's report. Groff's letter to Johnson was generally critical of the surveyor general, but could not disregard the report's findings. The letter ended with instructions for Johnson "to strike the case from your docket and notify Mr. Reavis of the action, allowing the usual time for an appeal to the Hon. Secretary of the Interior."

=== Reavis' response ===
In response to Johnson's report and the subsequent dismissal of his claim, Reavis filed suit against the United States in the Court of Claims. The lawsuit claimed the government had taken land belonging to Reavis and his wife and sold it to settlers, the government had reserved 1,500,000 acres (6,100 km^{2}) for its own use, had appropriated excessive water rights from the Gila River, and had denied the plaintiffs of their constitutional right to due process. Reavis sought US$11 million in damages already incurred with provisions in the suit for "further relief and costs" against future damages. Southern Pacific Railroad attorney Harvey S. Brown served as Reavis' lead counsel, while Robert G. Ingersoll and James Broadhead assisted in preparing the case.

At the time of filing, Reavis and his wife said they were aware that the surveyor general had released a report, but claimed to have been unable to obtain a copy. Following the initial filing, a continuance was filed to allow time for the collection of additional evidence. During this delay, in March 1891, the United States Court of Private Land Claims was created with jurisdiction to adjudicate claims involving old French, Mexican, and Spanish land claims.

After filing suit, Reavis went to California to locate witnesses who were familiar with the details of Sophia's youth. During October and November 1890, a series of depositions was held in San Francisco and Los Angeles to take testimony from the witnesses he had located. Key witness located during this process were Miguel Noe, Sr., his son Miguel, Jr., Andrés Sandoval, Alfred Sherwood, and John Snowball. Noe testified to having been a friend of José Ramon Carmen Maso and to having met the second baron during his time in California before his trip to Spain. The testimony included a wide variety of details related to the second baron's stay and included Noe accompanying the baron to Sherwood Valley to confirm that his granddaughter was well cared for. The senior Noe's testimony was supported by Miguel, Jr., relaying his childhood memories of the second baron. Sandoval testified to having run a boardinghouse and restaurant where the second baron and his son-in-law had stayed while they were in San Francisco. Sherwood provided details of Sophia's life from when she had been brought home by John Treadway at four months of age in July 1862, how she had been attended by her wet nurse and grandmother, and how her grandmother had told the young girl of a large inheritance she would someday receive. Snowball, in turn, testified as to how he had taken the orphaned girl into his house when she was eight and raised her till 1876, when she left to work with a dressmaker. Other witnesses filled in additional details of Sophia's life between 1879 and 1882.

In addition to details about his wife's early childhood, Reavis discovered other witnesses able to relate details about her family. In this manner, additional details were revealed about the second baron and his activities during the 1850s. Another revelation was the existence of a previously unknown third cousin to the third baroness, Miguel Lauro Peralta y Vasquez. Information discovered about this cousin showed that he had traveled through Arizona during the time in which Willing had purchased the rights to the Peralta grant and could potentially have posed as the second baron during the transaction.

A trip to San Bernardino in early 1892 resulted in Reavis discovering baptismal records for the Maso twins, along with a record of burial of mother and newborn son. Following this stop, Reavis returned to Guadalajara to search for additional records. A local historian informed him that some records had been stored in the archives of the Ayuntamiento (Common Council). An extended search of these records resulted in a copy of the first baron's probate proceedings being found. The apparent reason for why they had never been found in previous searches was that they had been misfiled with a group of 1824 papers, possibly as a consequence of the first baron's probate proceedings. Included in these records was a Peralta family genealogy and escutcheon, and cedulas showing the first baron's promotion to captain of dragoons (1748), declaring the royal intention to make a land grant (1748), and approving the grant (1778).

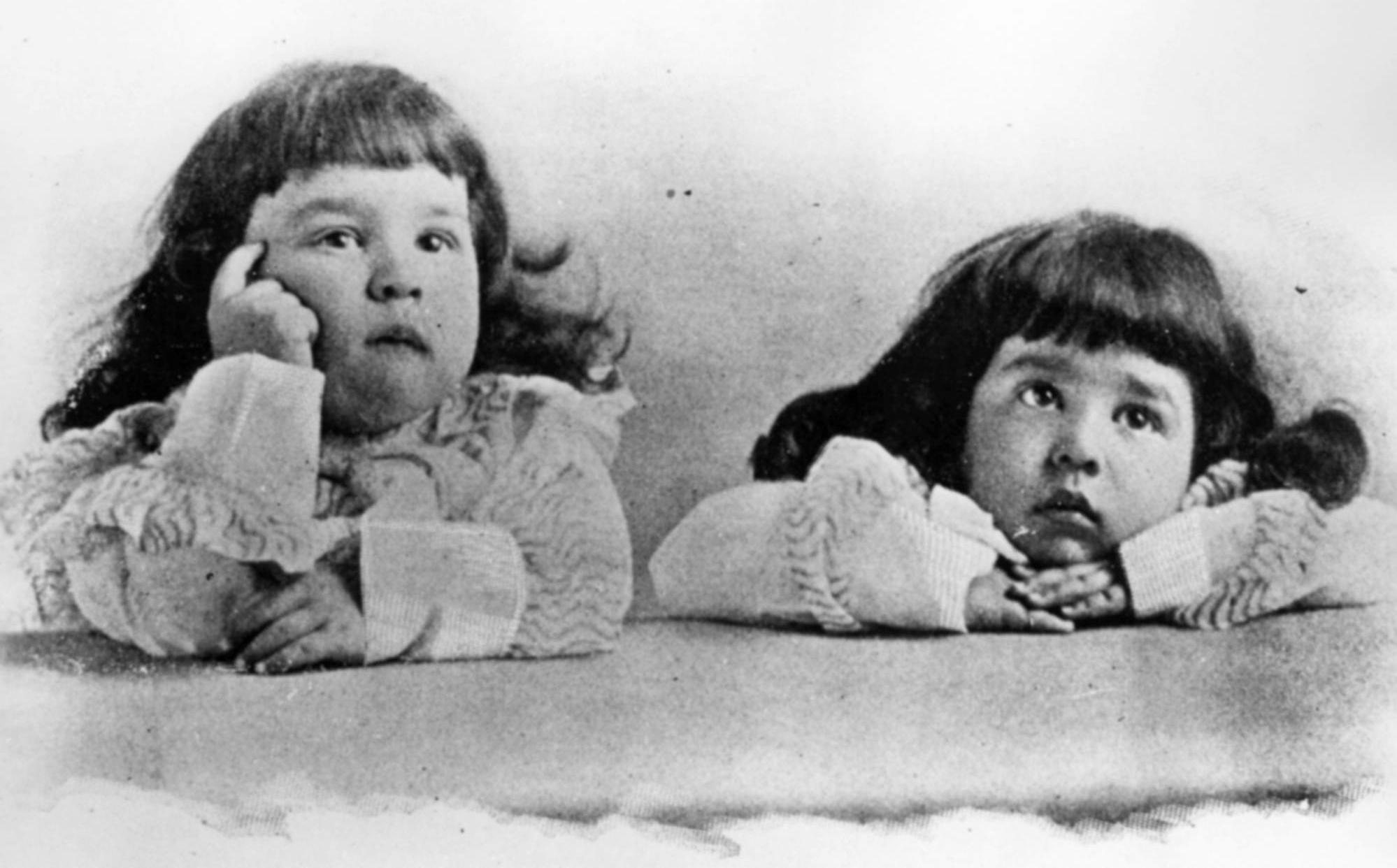
The Reavis twins, Carlos and Miguel, circa 1898

During the second half of 1892, Reavis had hoped to perform another search for witnesses in the company of James Broadhead. Broadhead's duties as a congressman, however, forced a delay of this plan until at least mid-1893. This delay worked for Reavis, as on March 8, 1893, his wife gave birth to twin boys, named Carlos Jesús and Miguel in honor of the first and second barons. Reavis viewed this birth as further proof of Sophia being a twin.

By 1893, Reavis began to develop financial problems. Travel, research, and legal expenses, combined with the maintenance expenses of his various households, had consumed most of his cash. Questions about the status of the Peralta claim, in turn, had dried up most new investments. To maintain solvency and defray his expenses, Reavis made arrangements with a group of Washington and San Francisco businessmen to extend him US$30,000 at the rate of US$2500/month.

With the volume of evidence and witness testimony accumulated, James Broadhead decided that the Peralta case was proven. Reavis went to Santa Fe, New Mexico Territory, to file his final complaint in February 1893. Land office draftsman William Strover recalled "an express wagon drove up and unloaded an array of boxes and packages, all addressed to the court and marked 'Peralta Grant'. When all was unpacked, three large tables, placed end to end, were filled with documents, ancient books, [and] pictures, including a large oil painting of the Marquis de Peralta, in his robes as grandee of Spain. There were documents with large leaden seals attached and signed by the king of Spain. There was a complete history of the marquis [and] letters to him and from him." After submitting his amended filing, Reavis and his family moved back to his mansion in Arizola.

=== Government investigation ===
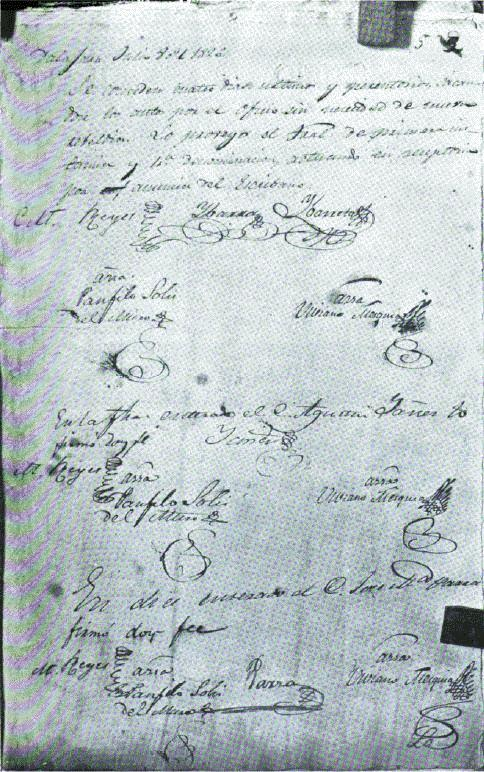
This forged Peralta grant document was created by adding a page number (upper right) and the word "Lo" (lower right) to an otherwise valid original.

Mathew Given Reynolds, a special attorney for the United States Court of Private Land Claims, was assigned to represent the government in Reavis' suit. Sevaro Mallet-Prevost, a Mexican-born New York lawyer familiar with Spanish and Mexican law, and William M. Tipton, an expert on document analysis, were assigned to assist. Mallet-Prevost and Tipton were dispatched to Tucson in January 1894 to make an examination of Reavis' original claim. From there, Mallet-Prevost continued on to the archives in Mexico.

As the archives in Guadalajara were in the process of being moved, Mallet-Prevost began his search in Mexico City. A search of the National Archives found no record of the Peralta grant, but did produce copies of signatures and 18th-century documents for use in later comparisons. From Mexico City, he went to Guadalajara, arriving just after the move of the archive was completed. Upon his return to Santa Fe in April 1894, Mallet-Prevost stated he was "entirely convinced of the spurious character of every paper there filed".

Mallet-Prevost was then sent to Spain, arriving in Madrid on June 12, 1894. The first place the Mexican-born lawyer checked was the Archives de Indias in Seville. There, he found that Reavis had arrived as a tourist and after several days had applied for and was granted permission to search the archives. Reavis searched bundles for several days without success, the archivist assigned to assist him believing the documents he was searching for did not exist. Reavis then requested access to case 77, drawer 3, legajo (file) 31. The assisting archivist was surprised to see a document he had previously never seen in the bundle. This incident was reported to the chief archivist, who ordered that Reavis be carefully watched and that all records be carefully numbered before he was allowed to examine them in the future.

When Reavis later returned to the archive, the prescribed measures had been put into place. At the end of one day, Reavis discovered a document in a bundle he was searching and requested a certified copy of it. The document was in an envelope and the paper folded. No other documents in the bundle were folded, and the document Reavis had found was not numbered as other pages in the bundle had been. Based upon this evidence and testimony from other clerks in the archive that the questioned document had not originally been part of the bundle, an arrest warrant was issued for Reavis. Reavis, however, left Seville before an arrest could be made, and influential friends in Madrid had suppressed any further investigation.

While Mallet-Prevost was at the archives in Spain, Reynolds went to California to perform background investigations on the witnesses Reavis had located. During this process, Reynolds was approached by San Francisco lawyer William W. Allen. Allen informed the investigator, "I have an original contract made by and between Reavis and his wife, and a witness, in which the witness is to receive a contingency fee of fifty thousand dollars if he testifies to a certain statement prepared by Reavis." Allen later told how Reavis had given Miguel Noe information about Don José Maso, his supposed close friend, for Noe to commit to memory. As part of the agreement, Noe was expected to locate other persons willing to memorize and testify to other events.

On September 6, 1894, the government requested a judge be commissioned to take testimony. Despite protests from Reavis' attorney, Judge Thomas C. Fuller was appointed. Testimony was taken in Guadalajara between October 16 and 26, 1894. Despite being informed of the proceedings, no one representing Reavis attended the proceedings. The most likely explanation for this is that Reavis could no longer pay his attorneys. The testimony centered on the December 20, 1748, cedula recommending the viceroy make the Peralta grant. When asked about this document, archivist Emitiro Robles Giles testified, "I have searched all those archives in which such a cedula should be found and I do not find it; I have found, however, a record to that effect; I have found in the protocol of the Notory Diego de la Sierra y Dueñas certain documents in relation to the matter, which are notoriously not genuine."

On January 5, 1895, Judge Wilbur F. Stone left New York to take evidence in Spain. Due to delays in obtaining cooperation from the Spanish government, this process was not completed till March 3, 1895. Following his return, a trial date was set for May 30, 1895. As details of the government's evidence became known, the lawyers representing Reavis began withdrawing from the case. Attorney Phil B. Thompson notified the Court of Private Land Claims of his withdrawal in a letter. James Broadhead was unable to continue to represent Reavis due to his appointment as Minister to Switzerland. In the meantime, Reavis' money had run out and he was destitute by the time the trial began.

=== Civil suit ===
The trial for Reavis' civil action began on Monday June 3, 1895, at 10:00. As neither Reavis nor anyone representing him was in attendance, the court adjourned till 14:00 before beginning without his presence. The first motion was from a lawyer representing a group of 106 individuals related to Miguel Peralta of Wickenburg, Arizona Territory. These real Peralta family members had heard about the case and hoped for a portion of any settlement. In his statement to the court, the lawyer informed the court that:

The Government Attorney ... yesterday afternoon placed in my hands the printed evidence .. and to my mind it did seem as though that grant, upon which Reavis relies—it seems to me, from a cursory examination ... that it is a fabrication, and as such, if such it turns out to be ... I want it distinctly understood by the Court and by the Government Attorney, that we have had nothing to do with it. We wash our hands from all of it.

Presentation of the government case began in earnest on Tuesday morning, Reavis and his counsel still not present. First on the stand was Mallet-Prevost, who testified about language and grammar problems present in some of the Peralta documents. As an example of the problem, he identified one document containing the word tanacion, a word not in the Spanish language. Another example was the word descrubudo, an incorrect past tense of the verb describir, being used instead of the correct descrito.

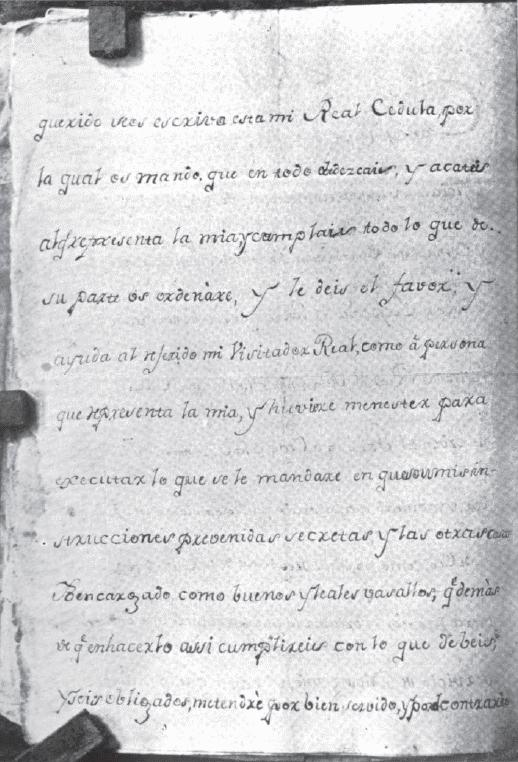
FA forged Peralta grant document: The page in entirety was inserted into a cedula.

Tipton, the government's document analysis expert, next took the stand to discuss the 1748 cedula. His examination had found that while the coversheet appeared to be authentic, the only mention of Don Miguel de Peralta was located on a piece of yellowed tissue paper pasted to the paper. He declared the five sheets of paper contained inside the cover to be forgeries due to their style of writing not being consistent with the handwriting in use at the time and the seals being glued to the paper instead of impressed by a metal seal as was the custom at the time of the document.

Following this, Tipton went on to problems with other original papers that had been located during the search of the Guadalajara archives. One group of papers was located in a set of papers related to work done by the notary Diego de la Sierra between 1697 and 1698; the Peralta papers had been inserted between two pages of a bound volume numbered 178 and 179, respectively, printed on paper that was shorter and narrower than the other pages of the book, showed evidence of being folded unlike the book's other pages, and were glued in place instead of being bound as was the rest of the volume.

Wednesday began with Mallet-Prevost testifying on his findings during his trip to Spain. He began with the will of Miguel de Peralta, where the only mentions of the name occurred over erasures. Additionally the will indicated it had been recorded in the Registry of Mortgages, volume 23, page 2, leaf 216, in section 122. An examination of that part of the registry found an unrelated document. Tipton and Mallet-Provest continued to examine other documents and depositions until later that afternoon. At that time, a telegraph arrived from Reavis asking for a continuance till June 10, 1895. The request was granted.

Reavis first appeared in court on Monday June 10, 1895. His first act was to ask for a continuance so that he could locate new legal representation. When this motion met resistance, Reavis moved to dismiss. Reavis was finally granted a one-day continuance so he could prepare to represent himself.

Tuesday's court session began with Reavis taking the stand. Beginning with an account of his early career, he described his meeting Dr. Willing and his trip to Prescott to obtain the Peralta documents. During the testimony, Reavis listed the names of the many influential legal and business figures with whom he had associated. When cross-examined by Reynolds, Reavis employed a tactic of providing excessive and irrelevant details within his answers. Later in the day, Reavis was questioned about his discovery of documents within the San Xavier record books, his 1883 trip to the archives in Mexico, and his trip to Spain.

Wednesday morning's session began with Reavis being questioned about his marriage contract to his wife, moved to details on his discovery of the "Inicial Monument", and was followed by questions about his financial transactions with the Southern Pacific Railroad and Silver King mine. When questioned about the boundaries of the grant, Reavis testified that he had found a copy of a map in the Mexico City archives, but the archivist had refused to make him a copy, as the map was surrounded by papers the archivist considered to be of a questionable nature. To explain the lack of documents from Mexico City, Reavis stated that the archives of the Inquisition had been sealed and no one was allowed access. In the afternoon, questioning turned to Reavis' discovery of the baptismal and burial records in San Bernardino. The subject then turned to Alfred Sherwood's 1887 affidavit regarding Sophia's noble birth.

During this line of questioning, an apparent contradiction appeared where Reavis had known of Miguel Noe and others with knowledge of Sophia's early life as early as 1885, but he did not look for any of these people till 1892. On the morning of June 13, Reavis was forced to admit he had doubted some of the documents in his 1883 filing were genuine, but he had still filed them on advice of counsel, while believing his wife was the true heir. At the same time, he admitted that he had at that time not told his lawyers of his marriage.

On Thursday afternoon, Father P.J. Stockman, rector of the church of San Bernardino, testified the records of the baptismal of Mrs. Reavis and her twin brother and deaths of the boy and his mother were forged. During a trip away from the parish, Stockman had left a young and inexperienced priest, Father Joseph O'Reilly, in charge of the church. The young priest had been convinced to lend the birth and death registers to Reavis, but had failed to inform Reavis that the church kept a separate index that was organized by last name and updated annually.

During Father Stockman's testimony, he pointed out differences in the inks between the pages related to Mrs. Reavis and the rest of the ledger. The index made no mention of Doña Sophia Laura or her son, with no evidence of either of their graves in the parish graveyard. This testimony was followed by Father O'Reilly, who identified Reavis as the person he had given possession of the record books for a period between two weeks and a month. Following the priest's testimony, the trial returned to an examination of the documentary evidence. Reavis was granted a request to be excused from the court during this phase of the trial.

Testimony on Friday began with Tipton examining the genealogical document for the Peralta family from the first baron's will. His testimony showed the first and last leaves of the document to be genuine documents from the indicated period, but that the pages in between were all forgeries. This was followed by an examination of the 1742 appointment of Don Miguel Peralta as royal inspector. It was pointed out the bottom of the document contained the line "A la ciudad de Guadalajara avisandola la eleccion que V[uestra] M[agastad] ha hecho de Visitador de la Nueva Espana de la persona del Baron Arizonaca ...". Within this line, an untrained person could see the words Visitador and Baron de Arizonaca had been written in a darker ink and by a different hand than the rest of the line. Further investigation of the document by Tipton had revealed the document had originally announced the appointment of Pedro Cebrián, 5th Count of Fuenclara as Viceroy of New Spain. Other evidence showed that the name Peralta had never appeared on lists of members of the Military Order of Montesa or the Knights of the Golden Fleece. The rest of the day was taken by Royal Johnson, who testified to the steps he had taken during his investigation of the Peralta claim and how he came to his conclusions. Rufus C. Hopkins testified on Saturday morning about his part in the Peralta claim investigation. During the examination, he admitted to having a limited knowledge of Spanish and having to make educated guesses as to a document's true meaning during his translations into English.

After adjourning for the weekend, the trial resumed on Monday, June 17. Local newspapers had reported that Mrs. Reavis had arrived from Denver on Friday afternoon and the courtroom was packed with spectators looking to see the third baroness. Upon taking the stand, she told of her childhood memories and then confirmed her husband's claim that an archivist in Seville had demanded a bribe before allowing documents related to the Peralta grant to be copied. She was, however, unable to provide any details about the claim papers. Throughout the proceedings, Mrs. Reavis maintained she was the granddaughter of the second baron despite intense questioning about his existence. Monday's testimony ended with Bishop Salpointe stating he was familiar with the San Xavier record book from his historical studies, and the documents related to Miguel de Peralta in the record book had not been present before the book had been sent to Philadelphia for the Centennial Exposition.

The final day of testimony came on June 18. In an attempt to bolster his case, Reavis attempted to show that a portrait of Don Miguel Nemecio de Peralta de la Córdoba bore a strong resemblance to his twins. Other portraits, photographs, and documents were introduced in an attempt to prove the existence of Don Miguel and his family. Closing arguments were presented the next day. The government waived the right to a closing statement, feeling the presented evidence was strong enough to prove their case. Reavis used the opportunity to introduce a bill of 52 objections.

The Court of Private Land Claims presented its findings on June 28, 1895. The decision rejected the claim, finding "that the claim is wholly fictitious and fraudulent" and deeming the various Peralta documents had been forged and "surreptitiously introduced" into the various archives and record books where they were discovered.

=== Criminal trial ===
Some Reavis associates did not believe the court's conclusion. Dr. A. T. Sherwood, who led an attempt to colonize the grant, told reporters, "It is impossible that any one man could have forged all the signatures in this case. Reavis would have had to forge over 200 Spanish documents and signatures. No man could have done it. It is the most improbable thing conceivable." Despite this support, Reavis was arrested and charged, in a 42-count indictment, with forgery, presenting false documents to the Court of Private Land Claims, and conspiracy to defraud the United States government.

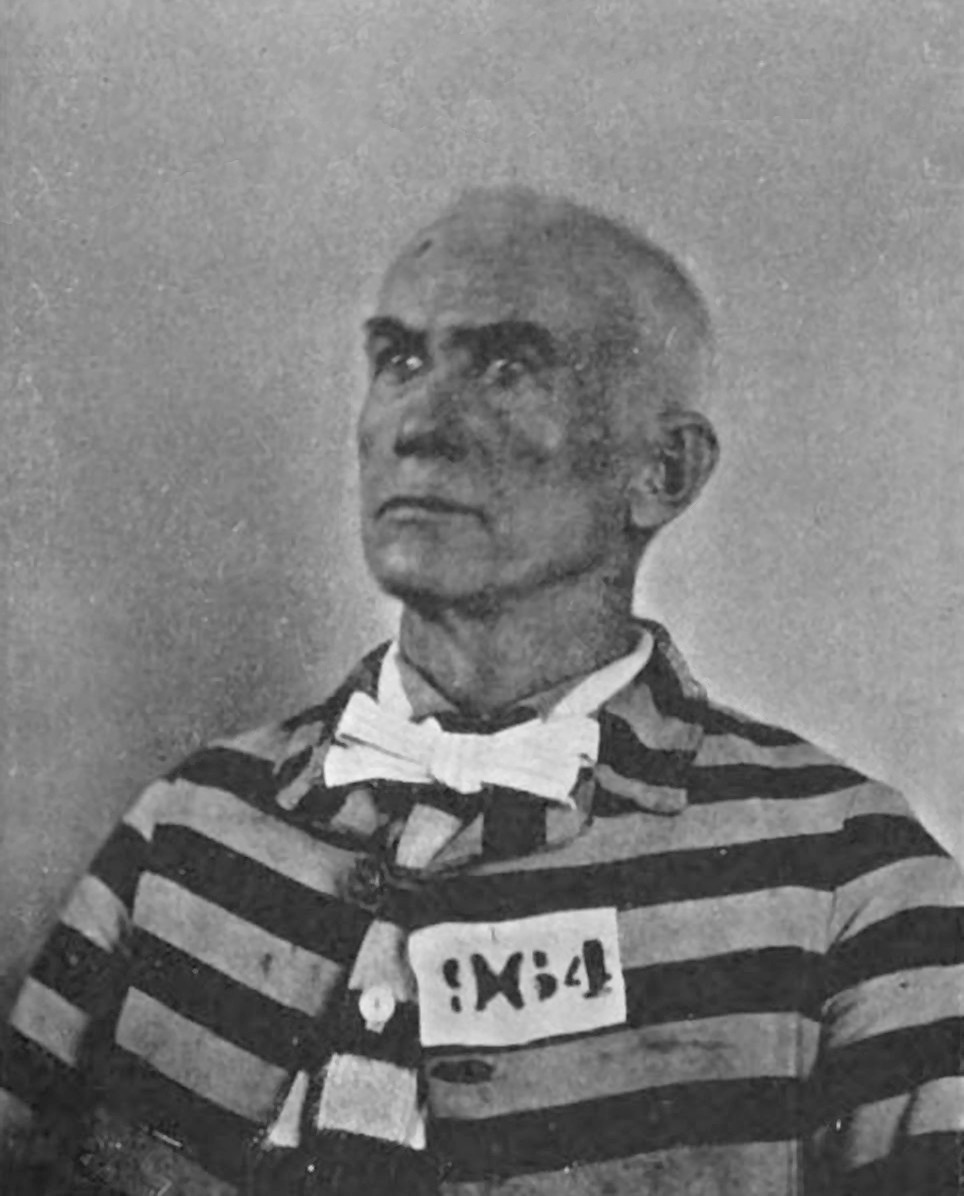
Reavis while imprisoned at Santa Fé, circa 1895

Reavis pled not guilty and requested release on bail. The court set bail and allowed him to send telegrams to his previous business associates requesting assistance. No one was found willing to post the US$500 bail. Reavis spent roughly a year in jail awaiting trial. During this time, his appeal of the civil ruling was denied and his wife moved to Denver. During this time, Reynolds went to California to investigate the witnesses who had testified for Reavis. While there, he discovered the date on John Treadway's tombstone showed November 21, 1861, six months before Mrs. Reavis' birth.

The criminal trial began on June 27, 1896. The trial was mostly a recapitulation of evidence presented during the civil trial. Confronted with the government's evidence, José Ramon Valencia and Andrés Sandoval confessed to perjury and testified against Reavis. During his testimony, Valencia stated that he had been given a set of facts by Miguel Noe and was to testify to these facts in exchange for US$20,000 once the claim was confirmed. Noe had left for Mexico following the Court of Land Claims ruling and was not expected to return. Reavis was found guilty on June 30, 1896. On July 17, 1896, he was sentenced to two years and a fine of US$5,000. (Note: The maximum possible sentence for his criminal conviction was 2 years and a US$10,000 fine.) Upon hearing the verdict, Reavis told his lawyer that he was sure the verdict would be reversed by the Supreme Court.

== Later life ==
Reavis was imprisoned from July 18, 1896, to April 18, 1898, earning a three-month sentence reduction for good behavior. By the time of the release, Sophia was living in Denver with the couple's children and working as a milliner. Following his release, Reavis visited San Francisco, New York City, and Washington, DC, in an effort to find new investors to finance his development plans for Arizona. Instead of the reaction he had previously received, people listened politely, but no longer took him seriously. Unsuccessful in finding any investors, Reavis moved to Denver for a time to live with his wife and sons. He also wandered from place to place advocating his vision for a large-scale irrigation system within Arizona. The "group of capitalists" he hoped would finance this dream never materialized.

In 1900, Reavis began the magazine Peralta Reavis Real Life Illustrated, in which he promised to provide the complete inside story of the Peralta fraud. The magazine folded after a single issue. The same year, he wrote a memoir that was published in several installments by the San Francisco Call under the title "The Confessions of the Baron of Arizona".

In June 1902, Reavis's wife filed for divorce on grounds of nonsupport. Following the divorce, little was heard from Reavis. By 1913, he was living in a poor house in Los Angeles. Reavis died in Denver on November 20, 1914, and was buried in a pauper's grave. Sophia died on April 5, 1934. Her obituary in the Rocky Mountain News made no mention of the Peralta grant.

After falling out of the public eye, Reavis became the subject of multiple magazine articles. He was even featured in an official tour book. Among the tales manufactured about the Baron of Arizona by these sources was that Reavis had used paper bearing the watermark of a Wisconsin paper mill that did not exist until the 1870s or '80s. Such tales discount the skill used by Reavis in the manufacture of his forgeries and the level of inspection they received before faults were eventually discovered.

Reavis' exploits have been dramatized, and highly fictionalized, in motion pictures and on television. A fraudulent land claim similar to the one created by Reavis was used as a plot device in the 1939 film The Night Riders. Reavis' life served as the basis for The Baron of Arizona, a 1950 movie in which Vincent Price played the title role. The long-running TV series Death Valley Days, which recounted famous incidents from the history of the Old West, aired two separate dramatizations of the Arizona land-grant scheme. The 1956 episode "The Baron of Arizona" starred Britt Lomond as James Reavis. In the 1968 episode "The Pieces of the Puzzle", Reavis was portrayed by veteran film actor Robert Taylor, who at the time was also the host of "Death Valley Days".

The mansion that Reavis built in Arizola was rediscovered by the National Park Service in 1953 following years of use as a barn by a local farmer. An evaluation in April 1963 by the Park Service determined restoration of the building was financially infeasible.

== Bibliography ==
- Anderson, George B. (1907). History of New Mexico: its resources and people. Vol. 1. Los Angeles: Pacific States Publishing Co. OCLC 1692911.
- Cookridge, E. H. (1972) [©1967]. The Baron of Arizona. New York: Ballantine Books. OCLC 32333347.
- Powell, Donald M. (Summer 1959). "The "Baron of Arizona" Self-Revealed: A letter to His Lawyer". Arizona and the West. 1 (2): 161–73.
- Powell, Donald M (1960). The Peralta grant; James Addison Reavis and the Barony of Arizona. Norman: University of Oklahoma Press. OCLC 1533625.
- Wagoner, Jay J. (1970). Arizona Territory 1863–1912: A Political history. Tucson: University of Arizona Press. ISBN 0-8165-0176-9.
