= George Douglas (actor) =

American actor (1903–1983)

- Born: George Lamar Hesselberg; August 7, 1903; Macon, Georgia, U.S.
- Died: June 11, 1983 (aged 79); San Diego, California, U.S.
- Occupation: Actor
- Years active: 1938–1962

George Douglas (born George Lamar Hesselberg; August 7, 1903 – June 11, 1983) was an American actor. He was born as the younger brother of the actor Melvyn Douglas. Their mother was Lena Priscilla (née Shackelford) and their father Edouard Gregory Hesselberg, a concert pianist and composer. His father was a Jewish immigrant from Riga, Russian Empire. His mother, a native of Tennessee, was Protestant and a Mayflower descendant. His maternal grandfather, George Shackelford, was a general and American Civil War veteran. He was the granduncle of Illeana Douglas, also an actress.

He appeared on Gunsmoke in 1959 as a “Man” in the episode “Wind” (S4E28).

He died in San Diego, California, United States, in June 1983.

== Filmography ==
Year	Title	Role	Notes
1938	Arsene Lupin Returns	Gendarme	Uncredited
1938	Young Fugitives	Dressy	Uncredited
1938	Rebellious Daughters	Joe Gilman	
1938	Pals of the Saddle	Paul Hartman	
1938	Sunset Murder Case	Carlo Rossmore	
1938	Out West with the Hardys	Mr. Carter	Uncredited
1939	Let Us Live	Ed Walsh	
1939	The Night Riders	Talbot posing as de Serrano	
1939	Good Girls Go to Paris	Baxter	Uncredited
1939	Dick Tracy's G-Men	Sandoval	Serial
1939	The Adventures of the Masked Phantom	Robert Murdock	
1939	The Kansas Terrors	The Commandante	
1940	City of Chance	Muscles	
1940	Covered Wagon Days	Ransome	
1940	Phantom Raiders	Taurez's Henchman	Uncredited
1940	Hold That Woman!	Steve Brady	
1940	The Tulsa Kid	Dirk Saunders	
1940	Lone Star Raiders	Henry Martin	
1942	Home in Wyomin'	Luigi Scalese aka Crowley	
1944	Riders of the Santa Fe	Tom Benner	
1947	King of the Bandits	Guard	Uncredited
1947	Her Husband's Affairs	Vice President	Uncredited
1947	A Double Life	Audience Member	Uncredited
1948	G-Men Never Forget	Prison Ward Room Guard	Serial, [Ch. 1], Uncredited
1948	Black Bart	Alcott	Uncredited
1948	Hazard	Gambler in Courtroom	Uncredited
1948	Secret Service Investigator	Secret Service Agent	Uncredited
1948	My Own True Love	Cutter	Uncredited
1948	Sons of Adventure	Frank Gate Guard	Uncredited
1949	A Woman's Secret	Policeman	Uncredited
1949	Federal Agents vs. Underworld, Inc	Courier	Serial, Uncredited
1949	A Connecticut Yankee in King Arthur's Court	Sergeant at Arms	Uncredited
1949	The Undercover Man	District Attorney	Uncredited
1951	My Forbidden Past	Deputy	Uncredited
1951	Street Bandits	Marty	Uncredited
1952	The Miraculous Blackhawk: Freedom's Champion	Police Chief Valdez	Serial, [Ch. 11], Uncredited
1954	The Snow Creature	Corey Jr.	
1956	Three for Jamie Dawn	Barry Devore	Uncredited
1958	Showdown at Boot Hill	Charles Maynor	
1958	Attack of the 50 Foot Woman	Sheriff Dubbitt	
1958	The Colossus of New York	Official	Uncredited
1962	The Couch	Business Man	Uncredited, (final film role)
