= Doreen McKay =

American actress

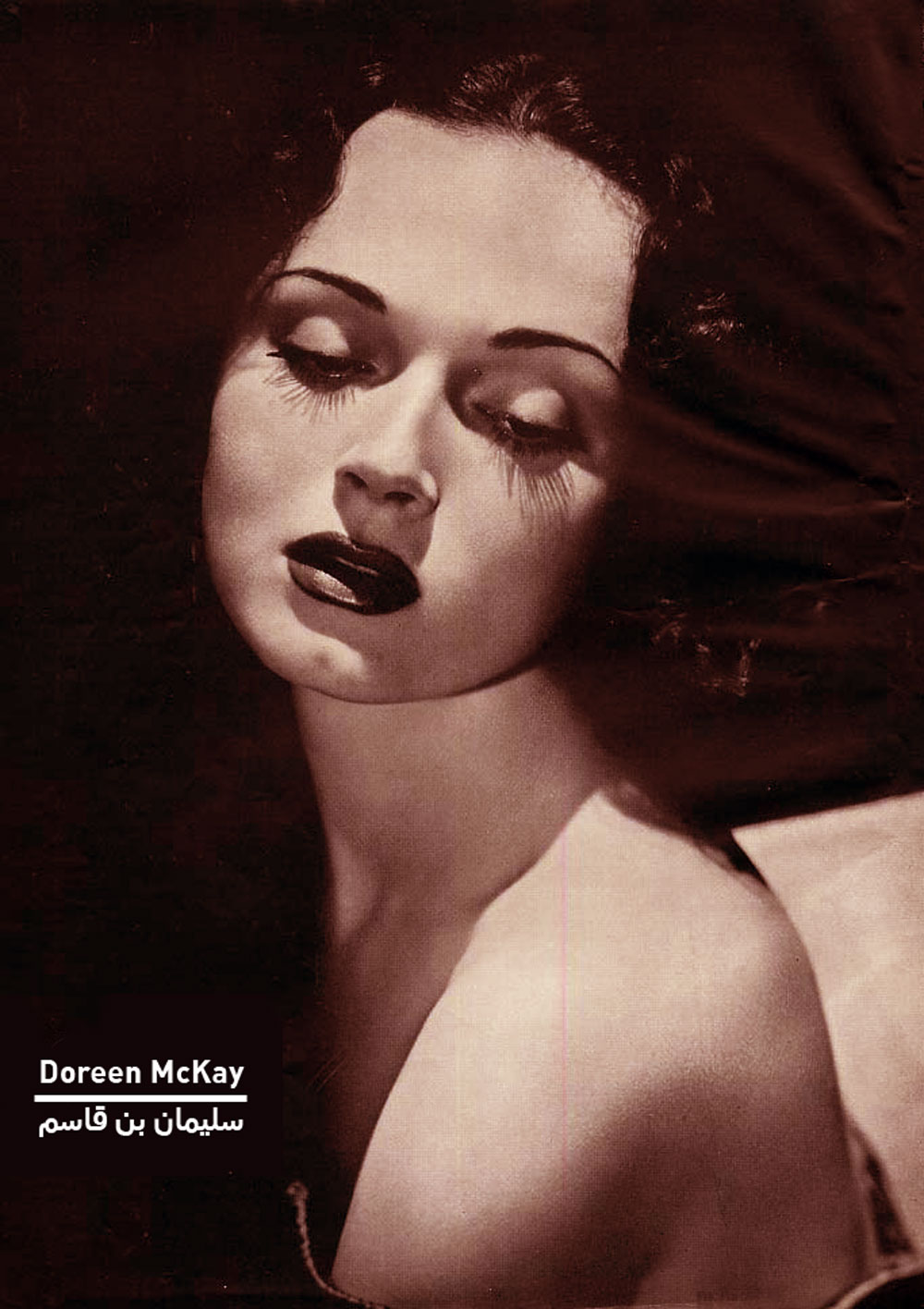
- Born: U.S.
- Occupation: Actress
- Years active: 1936–1939

Doreen McKay was an American film actress. She starred opposite John Wayne in the 1938 film Pals of the Saddle and the 1939 film The Night Riders.

== Filmography ==
- Star for a Night (1936)
- The Higgins Family (1938)
- Pals of the Saddle (1938)
- The Night Riders (1939)
- Eternally Yours (1939)
