= My Own True Love =

1949 film by Compton Bennett

- Theatrical release poster
- Directed by: Compton Bennett
- Screenplay by: Josef Mischel; Theodore Strauss; Arthur Kober
- Based on: novel Make You a Fine Wife by Yolanda Foldes
- Produced by: Val Lewton
- Starring: Phyllis Calvert; Melvyn Douglas; Wanda Hendrix; Philip Friend; Binnie Barnes; Alan Napier
- Cinematography: Charles B. Lang Jr.
- Edited by: LeRoy Stone
- Music by: Robert Emmett Dolan
- Production company: Paramount Pictures
- Distributed by: Paramount Pictures
- Release date: February 2, 1949
- Running time: 84 minutes
- Country: United States
- Language: English

My Own True Love is a 1949 American drama film directed by Compton Bennett and written by Arthur Kober, Josef Mischel and Theodore Strauss. The film stars Phyllis Calvert, Melvyn Douglas, Wanda Hendrix, Philip Friend, Binnie Barnes and Alan Napier. The film was released on February 2, 1949, by Paramount Pictures.

It is an adaptation of the novel Make You a Fine Wife by Yolanda Foldes. In postwar England, a woman is emotionally torn when her fiancée's son returns from the army and they strike up a potential romance.

== Plot ==
Shortly after VE Day, widowed Colonel Clive Heath encounters ATS Joan Clews at the barracks where his daughter Sheila, a corporal, is stationed. He has been working in the Army film unit, while he discovers that Joan has spent some time imprisoned by the Germans who caught her in France assisting escaping RAF airmen. Encouraged by his daughter they head out on a date, but his elaborate plans for a dinner in London are cut short by engine failure in his car.

The two bond, but problems arise when Clive's son who had been thought dead at the hands of the Japanese is discovered alive in a Malay village, but missing a leg. His old spark is gone and his father is discouraged, particularly when he shows more interest in Joan who his father has become engaged to. She tries to help him, working out that his attraction to her is a displacement to the Malaysian wife and child he lost when the Japanese captured the village. Father and son are eventually reconciled.

== Cast ==
- Phyllis Calvert as Joan Clews
- Melvyn Douglas as Clive Heath
- Wanda Hendrix as Sheila Heath
- Philip Friend as Michael Heath
- Binnie Barnes as Geraldine
- Alan Napier as Kittredge
- Arthur Shields as Iverson
- Phyllis Morris as Mrs. Peach
- Richard Webb as Corporal
- Wilson Benge asWaiter
- Clifford Brooke as Coffee Stall Proprietor
- Peter Coe as Rene
- George Douglas as Cutter
- Betty Fairfax as Woman in Hut
- Jean Fenwick as Corporal
- Leyland Hodgson as Taxi Driver
- Robin Hughes as English Officer
- T. Arthur Hughes as Doorman
- Miriam Jordan as Miss Robinson
- Paul Kreibich as Maitre d'Hotel
- Mary MacLaren as Woman in Hut
- Joseph Marr as Proprietor
- William Meader as Room Clerk
- Marie Osborne as Woman Passenger
- David Thursby as Mechanic
- Norma Varden a Red Cross Nurse
- Ernö Verebes as Captain of Waiters
- Patrick Whyte as Flight Lieutenant

== Production ==
The film was based on the novel Make You a Fine Wife. Paramount, who had already bought Golden Earrings by the same author, bought the screen rights in September 1946. Val Lewton was assigned to produce and Leonore Coffee given the job of writing the script.

Val Lewton had left RKO in 1945 to accept a contract with Paramount Pictures. He developed an adaption of The Cricket on the Hearth by Charles Dickens but the studio elected not to make it. Instead he was assigned to Make You a Fine Wife.

In December 1946 Paramount announced they had signed a contract with Phyllis Calvert — then in Los Angeles making her Hollywood debut with Time Out of Mind. She was to make six films, three over two years then one a year after that, starting with Make You a Fine Wife. In February 1947 Paramount announced the film version od Make You a Fine Wife would be called My Own True Love. Calvert returned to England to make a film then came back to Hollywood for the movie.

In April 1947 Compton Bennett signed to direct. By June Wanda Hendrix and Melvyn Douglas were set as co stars; they were the only Americans in the lead cast. Filming started in July. It was shot entirely in Los Angeles.

In September, while the film was still being shot, it was reported that the filmmakers had still not decided who Calvert's character should end up with. "In England we wouldn't worry about it," said Calvert. "It'd be either 'A' or 'U' and make big money."

Filming was difficult, marked by a conflict between Calvert and Val Lewton. At one stage Calvert walked off the set refusing to say a particular line of dialogue. Paramound ended up giving Calvert script approval rather than Lewton. The movie would be the only project Lewton would make at Paramount (which he left in March 1948( although he did develop The Sainted Sisters and Bride of Vengeance.

In October 1947 Calvert returned to London, where she appeared in a production of Peter Pan.

== Reception ==
Variety called the film "ponderously handled" and "fully 20 minutes too long."

Variety also called the movie "a major disappointment" financially.

== Bibliography ==
- Edmund G. Bansak. Fearing the Dark: The Val Lewton Career. McFarland, 2003.
