= Pals of the Saddle =

1938 film

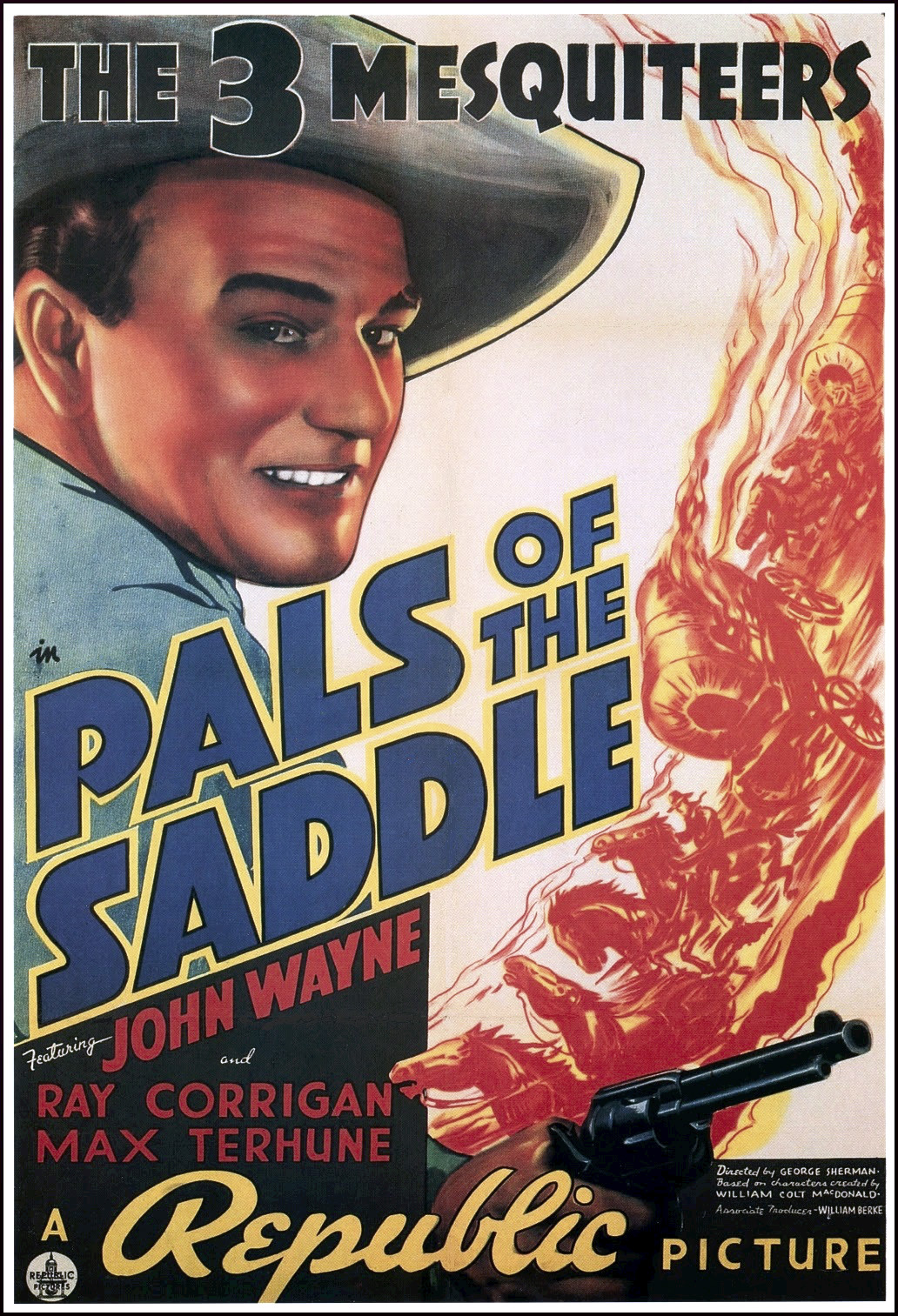
- Film poster
- Directed by: George Sherman
- Written by: Stanley Roberts; Betty Burbridge
- Based on: Based on characters by William Colt MacDonald
- Produced by: William A. Berke
- Starring: John Wayne; Ray Corrigan; Max Terhune
- Cinematography: Reggie Lanning
- Edited by: Tony Martinelli
- Production company: Republic Pictures
- Distributed by: Republic Pictures
- Release date: August 28, 1938
- Running time: 55 minutes
- Country: United States
- Language: English

Pals of the Saddle is a 1938 "Three Mesquiteers" Western film starring John Wayne and directed by George Sherman. This is the first of eight films in which Wayne played the lead in the popular series of fifty-one Three Mesquiteers films.

== Cast ==
- John Wayne as Stony Brooke
- Ray Corrigan as Tucson Smith
- Max Terhune as Lullaby Joslin
- Elmer as Elmer (Lullaby's Dummy) (uncredited)
- Doreen McKay as Ann aka Mirandy, Secret Service Agent
- Joseph Forte as Judge Hastings
- George Douglas as Paul Hartman (Foreign Agent)
- Frank Milan as Frank, Secret Service Agent
- Ted Adams as Henry C. Gordon (Smuggler)
- Harry Depp as Hotel desk clerk
- Dave Weber as Russian musician
- Don Orlando as Italian musician
- Charles Knight as English musician
- Jack Kirk as Sheriff Johnson
- Yakima Canutt as Henchman (uncredited)
- Otto Hoffman as Townsman (uncredited)
- Monte Montague as Henchman at Acme Salt Refinery (uncredited)
- George Montgomery as Rider (uncredited)

== See also ==
- John Wayne filmography
