= Edouard Hesselberg =

Russian composer

Edouard Gregory Hesselberg (3 May 1870 – 12 June 1935) was a Russian-American pianist, composer, and professor of music. He was the father of actor Melvyn Douglas.

== Early life and family ==
Hesselberg was born in Riga, Russian Empire (now Latvia), to a Jewish family, the son of Sarah Davidova from Ventspils and merchant Hessel (Heinrich) Hesselberg from Riga.

He learned to play piano in Königsberg. When he was three years old, the family moved to Oryol, Russia, where he studied at a classical gymnasium (1878–1886).

Hesselberg did some of his training at the Moscow Philharmonic Society. He also studied with Anton Rubinstein. Hesselberg lived in France and Germany before he moved to the USA in 1892. His parents and two of his three sisters also emigrated in 1908 and two years later settled in Missouri, where his sister Dr. Cora (Kora) Hesselberg became a pathologist and his sister Rhetia (Rezia/Rizia) Hesselberg, a violinist, became a noted music teacher. He had a third sister who remained in Russia, Ella Davidova.

In 1898, Hesselberg married Lena Shackelford, daughter of Col. George Taliaferro Shackelford, the Union Governor of Kentucky during the Civil War. He was the father of actors Melvyn Douglas and George Douglas and the great-grandfather of Illeana Douglas.

== Career ==
Hesselberg composed more than 100 piano pieces and songs during his career. He also wrote A review of music in Canada for a 1913 addition to a set of volumes called, Modern Music and Musicians (New York/Toronto; 1912). With his wife he wrote educational songs for children, published in the books Juvenile Gems and Echoes From Fairyland.

As a professor, Hesselberg was chair of the music departments at Denver, Wesleyan College (1900–5), Ward–Belmont College (1905–12), Toronto University (1912–17), and then Cornell.

He died in 1935, aged 65, at Cedars of Lebanon Hospital in Los Angeles, California, following an operation. He was buried in Missouri.
