= The Night Riders (1939 film) =

1939 film

- Theatrical poster
- Directed by: George Sherman
- Written by: Stanley Roberts; Betty Burbridge
- Based on: Based on characters by William Colt MacDonald
- Produced by: William A. Berke
- Starring: John Wayne; Ray Corrigan; Max Terhune
- Cinematography: Jack A. Marta
- Edited by: Lester Orlebeck
- Music by: William Lava
- Production company: Republic Pictures
- Distributed by: Republic Pictures
- Release date: April 12, 1939
- Running time: 56 minutes
- Country: United States
- Language: English

The Night Riders is a 1939 American "Three Mesquiteers" Western film starring John Wayne, Ray "Crash" Corrigan, and Max Terhune. Wayne played the lead in eight of the fifty-one Three Mesquiteer films. The director was George Sherman. The villain of the film was based on a real-life character in the Old West, James Reavis, who was also known as The Baron of Arizona.

== Plot ==
The Three Mesquiteers, Stony Brooke, Tucson Smith and Lullaby Joslin, are returning to Texas aboard a paddle steamer when a fight breaks out between two of the men playing blackjack. Pierce Talbot is caught cheating, pulls a knife on his attacker, who stabs him with his own knife and throws him overboard. Ashore, he encounters counterfeiter Hazleton, who has faked a land title to 13 million acres (52,609 km^{2}) in the name of Don Luis de Serrano. Talbot impersonates de Serrano, with Hazleton's assistant, Soleded, posing as his wife and after an investigation, the court rules that the claim is genuine.

The ranchers are worried de Serrano will take their land, but he assures them he will be fair. Instead, he imposes a rental of $1/acre, which is too much for most of the ranchers. He sends enforcers to collect and issues a notice that failure to pay will result in forfeiture of cattle. This is followed by confiscation of their land and then, by a $10/day extra for those who are left.

When the collectors try to collect from the Three Mesquiteers' ranch, the 3-M, a shootout develops. When the Mesquiteers run low on ammunition, they trick the collectors and disarm them. The sheriff arrives and tells them if they can't pay, they have to leave, which they do. Shortly after leaving, they help Susan Randall and her little brother, Tim, avoid a heavy tax on the cattle they are moving, by knocking out the two tax collectors. The Mesquiteers will have to start again, but the ranchers will find it too difficult. Stony says they should write to President Garfield, but the President writes back, saying he can't do anything.

The Mesquiteers, disguised with hoods and cloaks, start robbing the tax collectors. They become known as Los Capaqueros. They distribute the money to the ranchers, so they can pay their taxes. Hazleton and de Serrano lay a trap, by staking out the next ranch that is due to pay taxes. Los Capaqueros escape and hide in town. After nearly getting caught in the stable, they break into a nearby bedroom and encounter President Garfield. Garfield tells them that if they can provide evidence that de Serrano is guilty of at least one crime, he will back them all the way, using the US cavalry if necessary.

Hazleton suggests to de Serrano that they offer a $10,000 reward for the capture of Los Capaqueros, dead or alive. The Mesquiteers try to join up, to capture Los Capaqueros, but they are just too late. Just then, Senora de Serrano's is harassed by a mob, but the Mequiteers save her, by pushing her into her coach and scaring the horses. They chase after and, eventually stop the driverless coach, and return Senora de Serrano to her husband. Against Hazleton's advice, de Serrano makes each of them the officer for one of the companies who are going after Los Capaqueros. When de Serrano suggests a game of cards, Stony recognizes him as Talbot, the card player from the paddle steamer.

When Los Capaqueros rob some tax collectors at an inn, they are captured, but fight their way out. They just make it back to de Serrano's hacienda with enough time to make it look like they never left. They are sent out with the rest of de Serrrano's men, to look for themselves. They visit the Randall's, and Susan and Tim are upset that Stony and the others, who she thought were on the rancher's side, appear to be working for de Serrano. Stony is concerned by this, but cannot say anything in front of de Serrano's men. Tim grabs a rifle and follows the men. Hazleton is still suspicious and tells de Serrano. They search their room and find the Los Capaqueros disguises. He gets the sheriff and they catch Los Capaqueros, with Tim watching from behind a tree; but, before they are taken to jail, Stony grabs de Serrano and rips his sleeve, exposing the scar and proving that he is really Talbot.

Tim tells Susan, who visits the Mesquiteers in jail. Stony tells her about Talbot and asks her to go and see Captain Beckett of the steamer and to tell him to send all the details to President Garfield. Having found proof, Susan sends a telegram to the president, but just as it arrives, the president is shot. The Mesquiteers are taken in front of a firing squad. After they are shot, a mob of townsfolk and ranchers go after de Serrano. At the jail, the sheriff tells the Mesquiteers they can get up and they thank him for giving the firing squad blanks. The sheriff is told about the mob and goes to stop them, followed by the Mesquiteers.

The mob arrives at the hacienda and de Serrano shoots one of them when he tries to climb the wall. The Mequiteers get into the hacienda through the back and capture Talbot, Hazleton and Soledad. Stony tells Talbot that unless he signs a full confession, they won't tell the mob they're still alive and will let them do what they will. Hazleton finally admits the truth and writes a confession, followed by Talbot. They tell the mob and then, return to their ranch.

== Cast ==
- John Wayne as Stony Brooke
- Ray Corrigan as Tucson Smith
- Max Terhune as Lullaby Joslin
- Elmer as Elmer (Lullaby Joslin's Ventriloquist Dummy; uncredited)
- Doreen McKay as Soledad
- Ruth Rogers as Susan Randall
- George Douglas as Talbot Pierce, aka Don Luis de Serrano
- Tom Tyler as Henchman Jackson
- Kermit Maynard as Sheriff Pratt
- Sammy McKim as Tim Randall
- Walter Wills as Hazleton (the Forger)
- Ethan Laidlaw as Henchman Andrews
- Edward Peil Sr. as Rancher
- Tom London as Rancher
- Jack Ingram as Henchman Wilkins
- Bill Nestell as Brawler
- Hank Worden as Rancher (uncredited)
- Horace Murphy as Riverboat Captain Asa Beckett (uncredited)
- Yakima Canutt as Mob Member at Gate (uncredited)
- Bob Card as Rancher (uncredited)
- Allan Cavan as Judge (uncredited)
- Dick Dickinson as Henchman Rent Collector (uncredited

== See also ==
- John Wayne filmography
