= Melvyn Douglas =

American actor (1901–1981)

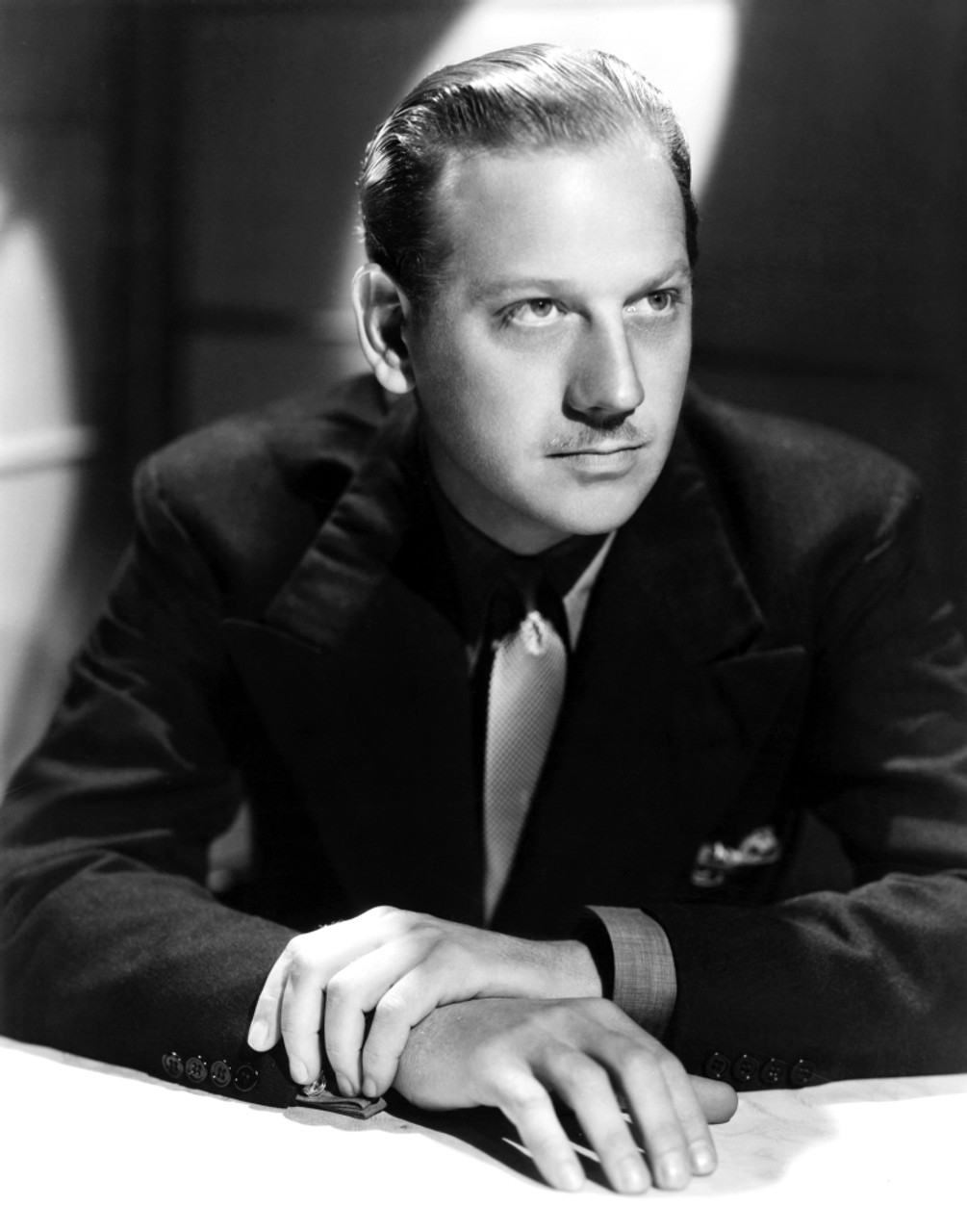
- Publicity photo c. 1940
- Born: Melvyn Edouard Hesselberg; April 5, 1901; Macon, Georgia, U.S.
- Died: August 4, 1981 (aged 80); New York City, U.S.
- Occupation: Actor
- Years active: 1926–1981
- Spouses: Rosalind Hightower (m. 1925; div. 1930) Helen Gahagan (m. 1931; died 1980)
- Children: 3
- Relatives: Illeana Douglas (granddaughter)
- Military career
- Branch: United States Army
- Rank: Major
- Conflicts: World War I World War II

Melvyn Douglas (born Melvyn Edouard Hesselberg, April 5, 1901 – August 4, 1981) was an American actor, whose stage and screen careers spanned from the late 1920s until the early 1980s. He was one of 24 performers to win the Triple Crown of Acting – winning two Academy Awards (both in the Best Supporting Actor category), a Primetime Emmy Award, and a Tony Award.

Douglas came to prominence in 1929 as a suave leading man, perhaps best typified by his performance in the romantic comedy Ninotchka (1939) with Greta Garbo, and appeared in many films during the Golden Age of Hollywood. Douglas later played mature and fatherly characters, as in his Oscar-winning performances in Hud (1963) and Being There (1979) and his Oscar–nominated performance in I Never Sang for My Father (1970). He won a Tony Award for Best Actor in a Play for Gore Vidal's play The Best Man (1960).

== Early life ==
Douglas was born in Macon, Georgia, the son of Lena Priscilla (née Shackelford) and Edouard Gregory Hesselberg, a concert pianist and composer. His father was a Jewish emigrant from Riga, Latvia (at that time part of the Russian Empire). His mother, a native of Tennessee, was Protestant and a Mayflower descendant.

Douglas, in his autobiography See You at the Movies (1987), wrote that he was unaware of his Jewish background until later in his youth: "I did not learn about the non-Christian part of my heritage until my early teens." His parents preferred to hide his Jewish heritage. His aunts on his father's side told him "the truth" when he was 14. He wrote that he "admired them unstintingly"; they, in turn, treated him like a son.

Though his father, a prominent concert pianist, taught music at a succession of colleges in the U.S. and Canada, Douglas never graduated from high school. He took the surname of his maternal grandmother and became known as Melvyn Douglas.

== Career ==
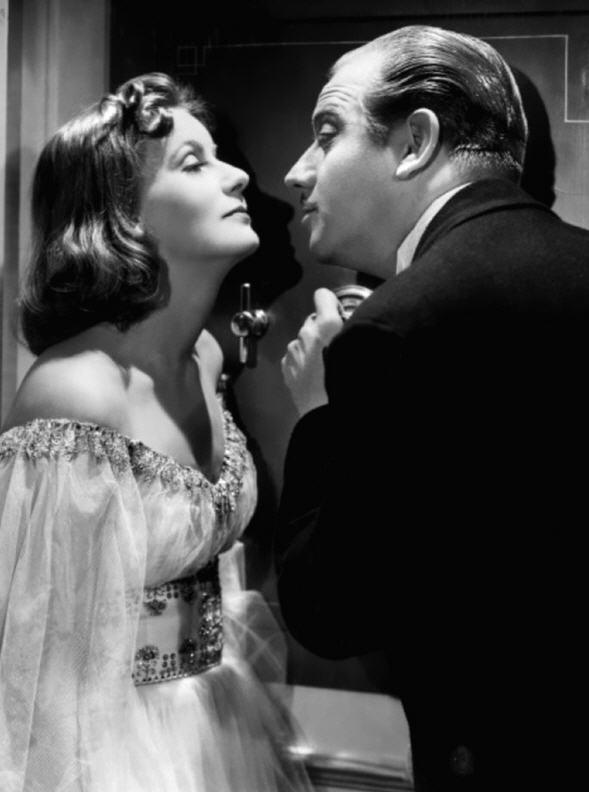
Douglas and Greta Garbo in Ninotchka (1939)

Douglas developed his acting skills in Shakespearean repertory while in his teens and with stock companies in Sioux City, Iowa; Evansville, Indiana; Madison, Wisconsin; and Detroit, Michigan. He served in the United States Army in World War I. He established an outdoor theatre in Chicago. He had a long theatre, film and television career as a lead player, stretching from his 1930 Broadway role in Tonight or Never (opposite his future wife, Helen Gahagan) until just before his death. Douglas shared top billing with Boris Karloff and Charles Laughton in James Whale's sardonic horror classic The Old Dark House in 1932.

Douglas appeared as the hero in the 1932 horror film The Vampire Bat and the sophisticated leading man in She Married Her Boss (1935). He appeared with Joan Crawford in several films, most notably A Woman's Face (1941), and starred opposite Greta Garbo in three films: As You Desire Me (1932), Ninotchka (1939) and Garbo's final film Two-Faced Woman (1941). One of his most sympathetic roles was as the belatedly attentive father in Captains Courageous (1937).

During World War II, Douglas served first as a director of the Arts Council in the Office of Civilian Defense, and he then again served in the United States Army rising to the rank of major in the Special Services Entertainment Production Unit. According to his granddaughter Illeana Douglas, Melvyn Douglas first met Peter Sellers (his future Being There co-star) while in Burma during the war, when Sellers was serving in the Royal Air Force. After the war, Douglas returned to films and more mature roles in The Sea of Grass (1947) and Mr. Blandings Builds His Dream House (1948).

From 1952 to 1961, Douglas made no film appearances, concentrating instead on stage and television work. During November 1952 to January 1953, Douglas starred in the DuMont detective show Steve Randall (Hollywood Off Beat) which then moved to CBS. In the summer of 1953, he briefly hosted the DuMont game show Blind Date. In the summer of 1959, Douglas hosted eleven original episodes of a CBS Western anthology television series titled Frontier Justice, a production of Dick Powell's Four Star Television.

Douglas returned to films in the 1960s. As he aged, he took on older-man and fatherly roles in movies such as Hud (1963, for which he won his first Academy Award for Best Supporting Actor), The Americanization of Emily, the American Civil War comedy Advance to the Rear (both 1964), an episode of The Fugitive (1966), I Never Sang for My Father (1970, for which he was nominated for the Academy Award for Best Actor) and The Candidate (1972). He won his second Academy Award for Best Supporting Actor for the comedy-drama Being There (1979). However, Douglas confirmed in one of his final interviews that he refused to attend the 52nd Academy Awards ceremony because he could not bear having to compete against child actor Justin Henry for Kramer vs. Kramer.

In addition to his Academy Awards, Douglas won a Tony Award for his Broadway lead role in the 1960 The Best Man by Gore Vidal and an Emmy for his 1967 role in Do Not Go Gentle Into That Good Night.

Douglas's final complete screen appearance was in the 1981 horror film Ghost Story. He died before completing all of his scenes for the film The Hot Touch (1982); the film had to be edited to compensate for Douglas's incomplete role.

Douglas has two stars on the Hollywood Walk of Fame; one for movies, located at 6423 Hollywood Boulevard, and another for television at 6601 Hollywood Boulevard.

== Personal life ==
Douglas, as Hesselberg, was married briefly to artist Rosalind Hightower, and they had one child, (Melvyn) Gregory Hesselberg, in 1926. Hesselberg, an artist, is the father of actress Illeana Douglas.

In 1931, Douglas married actress Helen Gahagan. They traveled to Europe that same year, and "were horrified by French and German anti-Semitism". As a result, they became outspoken anti-fascists. Douglas was also an active New Deal Democrat, serving on the State Central Committee of the California Democratic Party in the 1930s and 40s.

Gahagan Douglas also entered politics (she began using her husband's name when she did), becoming a three-term congresswoman. She was Richard Nixon's unsuccessful opponent for the United States Senate seat from California in 1950. Nixon accused Gahagan Douglas of being soft on Communism because of her opposition to the House Un-American Activities Committee. Nixon went so far as to call her "pink right down to her underwear". It was Gahagan Douglas who popularized Nixon's nickname "Tricky Dick".

Douglas was a member of the executive committee of the Writers and Artists for Peace in the Middle East, a pro-Israel group, during the 1970s.

The Douglases hired architect Roland Coate to design a home for them in 1938 on a 3-acre (1.2 ha) lot they owned in Outpost Estates, Los Angeles. The result was a one-story, 6,748-square-foot (626.9 m^{2}) home.

The Douglases had two children: Peter Gahagan Douglas (1933) and Mary Helen Douglas (1938).

=== Death ===
The couple remained married until Helen Gahagan Douglas's death in 1980 from cancer. Melvyn Douglas died a year later, in 1981, aged 80, from pneumonia and cardiac complications in New York City at Sloan Kettering Hospital.

== Broadway roles ==
Sources: Internet Broadway Database and Playbill

- A Free Soul (1928) as Ace Wilfong
- Back Here (1928) as Sergeant "Terry" O'Brien
- Now-a-Days (1929) as Boyd Butler
- Recapture (1930) as Henry C. Martin
- Tonight or Never (1931) as the Unknown Gentleman
- No More Ladies (1934) as Sheridan Warren
- Mother Lode (1934) as Carey Ried (also staged)
- De Luxe (1935) as Pat Dantry
- Tapestry In Gray (1935) as Erik Nordgren
- Two Blind Mice (1949) as Tommy Thurston
- The Bird Cage (1950) as Wally Williams
- The Little Blue Light (1951) as Frank
- Glad Tidings (1951) as Steve Whitney
- Time Out for Ginger (1952) as Howard Carol
- Inherit the Wind (1955) as Henry Drummond (replacement)
- The Waltz of the Toreadors (1958) as General St. Pé
- Juno (1959) as "Captain" Jack Boyle
- The Gang's All Here (1959) as Griffith P. Hastings
- The Best Man (1960) as William Russell
- Spofford (1967) as Spofford

Douglas also staged Moor Born (1934), Mother Lode (1934) and Within the Gates (1934-1935) and produced Call Me Mister (1946-1948).

== Filmography ==
Year	Title	Role	Notes
1931	Tonight or Never	Jim Fletcher	
1931	Prestige	Captain Andre Verlaine	
1932	The Wiser Sex	David Rolfe	
1932	The Broken Wing	Philip 'Phil' Marvin	
1932	As You Desire Me	Count Bruno Varelli	
1932	The Old Dark House	Mr. Penderel	
1933	The Vampire Bat	Karl Brettschneider	
1933	Counsellor at Law	Roy Darwin	
1933	Nagana	Dr. Walter Tradnor	
1934	Dangerous Corner	Charles Stanton	
1934	Woman in the Dark	Tony Robson	
1935	The People's Enemy	George R. "Traps" Stuart	
1935	She Married Her Boss	Richard Barclay	
1935	Mary Burns, Fugitive	Barton Powell	
1935	Annie Oakley	Jeff Hogarth	
1935	The Lone Wolf Returns	Michael Lanyard	
1936	And So They Were Married	Stephen Blake	
1936	The Gorgeous Hussy	John Randolph	
1936	Theodora Goes Wild	Michael Grant	
1937	Women of Glamour	Richard "Dick" Stark	
1937	Captains Courageous	Frank Burton Cheyne	
1937	I Met Him in Paris	George Potter	
1937	Angel	Anthony "Tony" Halton	
1937	I'll Take Romance	James Guthrie	
1938	Arsène Lupin Returns	Arsène Lupin	
1938	There's Always a Woman	William Reardon	
1938	The Toy Wife	George Sartoris	
1938	Fast Company	Joel Sloane	
1938	That Certain Age	Vincent Bullitt	
1938	The Shining Hour	Henry Linden	
1938	There's That Woman Again	William Reardon	
1939	Tell No Tales	Michael Cassidy	
1939	Good Girls Go to Paris	Ronald Brooke	
1939	Ninotchka	Count Léon d'Algout	
1939	The Amazing Mr. Williams	Police Lieutenant Kenny Williams	
1940	Too Many Husbands	Henry Lowndes	
1940	He Stayed for Breakfast	Paul Boliet	
1940	Third Finger, Left Hand	Jeff Thompson	
1940	This Thing Called Love	Tice Collins	
1941	That Uncertain Feeling	Larry Baker	
1941	A Woman's Face	Dr. Gustaf Segert	
1941	Our Wife	Jerome "Jerry" Marvin	
1941	Two-Faced Woman	Larry Blake	
1942	We Were Dancing	Nicholas Eugen August Wolfgang "Nikki" Prax	
1942	They All Kissed the Bride	Michael "Mike" Holmes	
1943	Three Hearts for Julia	Jeff Seabrook	
1947	The Sea of Grass	Brice Chamberlain	
1947	The Guilt of Janet Ames	Smithfield "Smitty" Cobb	
1948	Mr. Blandings Builds His Dream House	Bill Cole	
1948	My Own True Love	Clive Heath	
1949	A Woman's Secret	Luke Jordan	
1949	The Great Sinner	Armand de Glasse	
1951	My Forbidden Past	Paul Beaurevel	
1951	On the Loose	Frank Bradley	
1962	Billy Budd	The Dansker	
1963	Hud	Homer Bannon	Academy Award for Best Supporting Actor; Laurel Award for Top Male Supporting Performance; National Board of Review Award for Best Supporting Actor; Nominated—Golden Globe Award for Best Supporting Actor – Motion Picture
1964	Advance to the Rear	Col. Claude Brackenbury	
1964	The Americanization of Emily	Adm. William Jessup	Nominated—Laurel Award for Best Male Supporting Performance
1965	Rapture	Frederick Larbaud	
1965	Once Upon a Tractor	Martin	Short
1967	Hotel	Warren Trent	
1970	I Never Sang for My Father	Tom Garrison	New York Film Critics Circle Award for Best Actor (2nd Place); Nominated—Academy Award for Best Actor; Nominated—Golden Globe Award for Best Actor in a Motion Picture – Drama; Nominated—Laurel Award for Best Male Dramatic Performance
1972	One Is a Lonely Number	Joseph Provo	
1972	The Candidate	John J. McKay	
1976	The Tenant	Monsieur Zy	
1977	Twilight's Last Gleaming	Zachariah Guthrie	
1977	Intimate Strangers	Donald's father	
1979	The Seduction of Joe Tynan	Senator Birney	
1979	Being There	Benjamin Rand	Academy Award for Best Supporting Actor; Golden Globe Award for Best Supporting Actor – Motion Picture; Los Angeles Film Critics Association Award for Best Supporting Actor; National Society of Film Critics Award for Best Supporting Actor (2nd Place); New York Film Critics Circle Award for Best Supporting Actor
1980	The Changeling	Senator Joe Carmichael	Nominated—Saturn Award for Best Supporting Actor
1980	Tell Me a Riddle	David	
1981	Ghost Story	Dr. John Jaffrey	Released posthumously
1982	The Hot Touch	Max Reich	Final film role; released posthumously

== Partial television credits ==
Year	Title	Role	Notes
1949	The Philco-Goodyear Television Playhouse	Richard Gordon	Episodes: "The Five Lives of Richard Gordon" and "The Strange Christmas Dinner"
1950	Lux Video Theatre	James Strickland	Episode: "To Thine Own Self"
1950	Pulitzer Prize Playhouse	Eugene Morgan; Martin Luther Cooper	Episode: "The Magnificent Ambersons"; Episode: "Mrs. January and Mr. Ex"
1952	Celanese Theatre	Archduke Rudolph von Habsburg	Episode: "Reunion in Vienna"
1952	Hollywood Off-Beat	Steve Randall	12 episodes
1955	The Ford Television Theatre	George Manners	Episode: "Letters Marked Personal"
1955–1956	The Alcoa Hour	Charles Turner; Jim Conway	Episode: "Man on a Tiger"; Episode: "Thunder in Washington"
1957–1958	The United States Steel Hour	Census Taker; Dr. Victor Payson/Narrator	Episode: "Second Chance"; Episode: "The Hill Wife"
1957–1959	Playhouse 90	General Parker; Ansel Gibbs; Stalin; Howard Hoagland	Episode: "Judgment at Nuremberg"; Episode: "The Return of Ansel Gibbs"; Episode: "The Plot to Kill Stalin"; Episode: "The Greer Case"
1959	Frontier Justice	Host	11 episodes
1960	Sunday Showcase	Mark Twain	Episode: "Our American Heritage: Shadow of a Soldier"
1963	Ben Casey	Burton Strang	Episode: "Rage Against the Dying Light"
1963	Bob Hope Presents the Chrysler Theatre	Pat Konke	Episode: "A Killing at Sundial"
1964	A Very Close Family	Father	TV movie
1965	Inherit the Wind	Henry Drummond	Hallmark Hall of Fame TV movie Nominated—Primetime Emmy Award for Outstanding Single Performance by an Actor in a Leading Role in a Drama
1966	The Fugitive	Mark Ryder	Episode: "The 2130"
1966	Lamp at Midnight	Galileo Galilei	TV movie
1967	CBS Playhouse	Peter Schermann	Episode: "Do Not Go Gentle Into That Good Night"; Primetime Emmy Award for Outstanding Single Performance by an Actor in a Leading Role in a Drama
1967	The Crucible	Governor Danforth	TV movie
1968	Companions in Nightmare	Dr. Lawrence Strelson	TV movie
1970	The Choice		TV movie
1970	Hunters Are for Killing	Keller Floran	TV movie
1971	Death Takes a Holiday	Judge Earl Chapman	TV movie
1972	Circle of Fear	Grandpa	Episode: "House of Evil"
1973	The Going Up of David Lev	Grandfather	TV movie
1974	The Death Squad	Police Captain Earl Kreski	TV movie
1974	Murder or Mercy	Dr. Paul Harelson	TV movie
1975	Benjamin Franklin	Benjamin Franklin	Miniseries
1977	ABC Weekend Special	Grandpa Doc	Episode: "Portrait of Grandpa Doc"

Source: Internet Movie Database

== Radio appearances ==
Year	Program	Episode/source
1942	Philip Morris Playhouse	No Time for Comedy
1942	Philip Morris Playhouse	Take a Letter, Darling

== Sources ==
- Douglas, Melvyn; Tom Arthur (1986). See You at the Movies: The Autobiography of Melvyn Douglas. Lanham, MD: University Press of America. ISBN 0-8191-5390-7.
