= Hector de Castro =

Ottoman- born American diplomat (1849–1909)

Hector de Castro (1849 – January 30, 1909) was an Ottoman born American businessman and diplomat.

Born in Istanbul, de Castro was educated in Paris and Vienna. He emigrated to the United States and was naturalized in 1885. He became Vice President of the American Cable Company. He resigned from American Cable Company in 1890 to accept position as Secretary of the Intercontinental Railroad Commission In 1890, de Castro married Grace Aldrich of New York. The couple had no children.

In 1897, de Castro was appointed United States General Consul in Rome. Mrs. de Castro died in January 1908 and de Castro transferred to the General Consul position in Zurich in June the same year.

De Castro died from nephritis on January 30, 1909. He was buried in Rome.
